= 2013–14 Al Ain FC season =

Al Ain
2013–14 season
- President: Mohammed Bin Zayed
- Manager: Zlatko Dalić
- Stadium: Hazza Bin Zayed, Al Ain
- Arabian Gulf League: 6
- Arabian Gulf Super Cup: Runners-up
- President's Cup: Winners
- League Cup: Group Stage
- AFC Champions League: Quarter-finals
- Top goalscorer: League: Asamoah Gyan (29); All: Asamoah Gyan (47)
Home colours	Away colours

The 2013–14 season was Al Ain Football Club's 46th in existence and the club's 39th consecutive season in the top-level football league in the UAE.

== Club ==
=== Current technical staff ===
Position	Name
First team head coach	(Croatia) Zlatko Dalić
Assistant coach	(Croatia) Dražen Ladić (United States) Hisham Sorour
Goalkeeping coach	(Iraq) Bashar Abduljalil
Fitness coach	(Croatia) Frano Lecco
Club doctor	(Greece) Nicholas Tzorudis
Physiotherapist	Ibstolius Derstas; Georgios Bosineaus

=== Other information ===
Chairman	(United Arab Emirates) Mohammed Bin Zayed Al Nahyan
Vice Chairman	(United Arab Emirates) Hazza Bin Zayed Al Nahyan
Chairman of Board of Directors	(United Arab Emirates) Abdullah Bin Mohammed Bin Khaled Al Nahyan
Vice Chairman of Board of Directors	(United Arab Emirates) Rashed Mubarak Al Hajeri
Board of Directors Member	(United Arab Emirates) Mohammed Salem Omair Al Shamisi
Board of Directors Member	(United Arab Emirates) Mohammed Abdullah Bin Bdoua Al Darmaki
Board of Directors Member	(United Arab Emirates) Mohamed Obaid Helal Al Dhaheri
Ground (capacity and dimensions)	Hazza Bin Zayed Stadium (25,000 / 45x50 metres)

Updated to match played 15 June 2014
Source: Al Ain FC, HBZStadium

=== Kits ===
Supplier: Nike / Sponsor: First Gulf Bank / Abu Dhabi Airports

== Season overview ==
=== June ===
Al Ain started summer transfer window signing central midfielder Sultan Al Ghaferi for a three-year deal after the end of his contract with Baniyas. On 11 June, Ivorian central midfielder Ibrahim Diaky was officially presented as an Al Ain player at the press conference for two seasons in exchange deal with Al Jazira of joining Musallam Fayez and Yaqoub Al Hosani along with €1 million. On 17 June, Al Ain announced the end of contract Abdullah Malallah and agreed to terminate the contract with Mohamed Malallah. On 30 June, Saif Mohammed signed a two-year loan extension with Al Dhafra.

=== July ===
On 3 July, manager Cosmin Olaroiu moved to manage Al Ain's bitter rivals Al Ahli. On 16 July, it was announced at a press conference the extension of contracts Helal Saeed, Mohanad Salem and Ismail Ahmed. Goalkeeper Khalid Essa moved to Al Ain in undisclosed deal. Hazza Salem, Bandar Al Ahbabi, Yousif Abdelrahman returned to Al Ain after the end of their loans. On 25 July, Al Ain announced that Jorge Fossati will be appointed as the new manager for a one-year deal. On 31 July, Al Dhafra announced signing Al Ain goalkeeper Abdulla Sultan for 5 seasons in undisclosed deal. The 27-year-old leaves after 3 seasons with the first team.

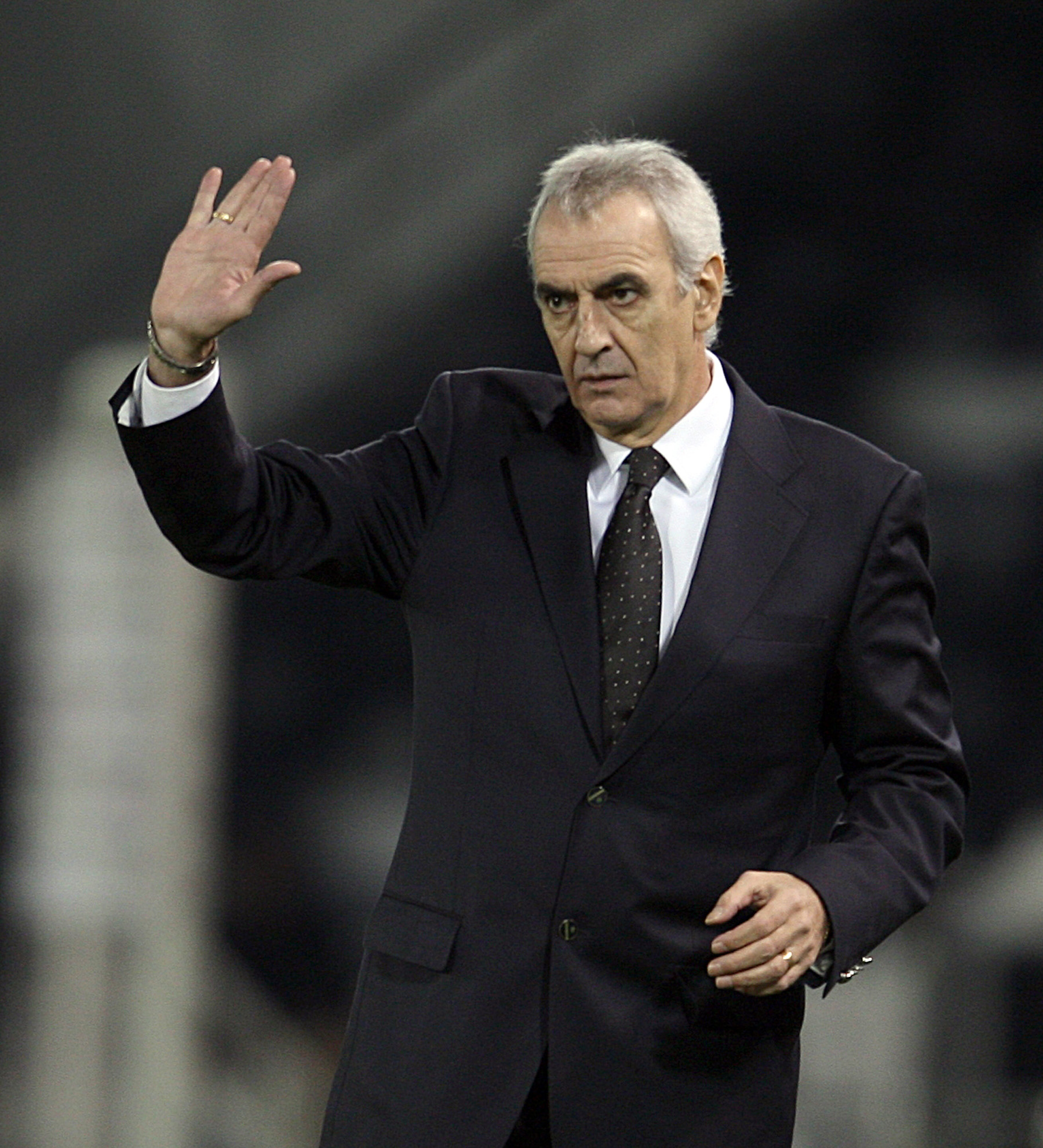
Jorge Fossati Al Ain FC formerly manager, sacked after seven weeks in charge

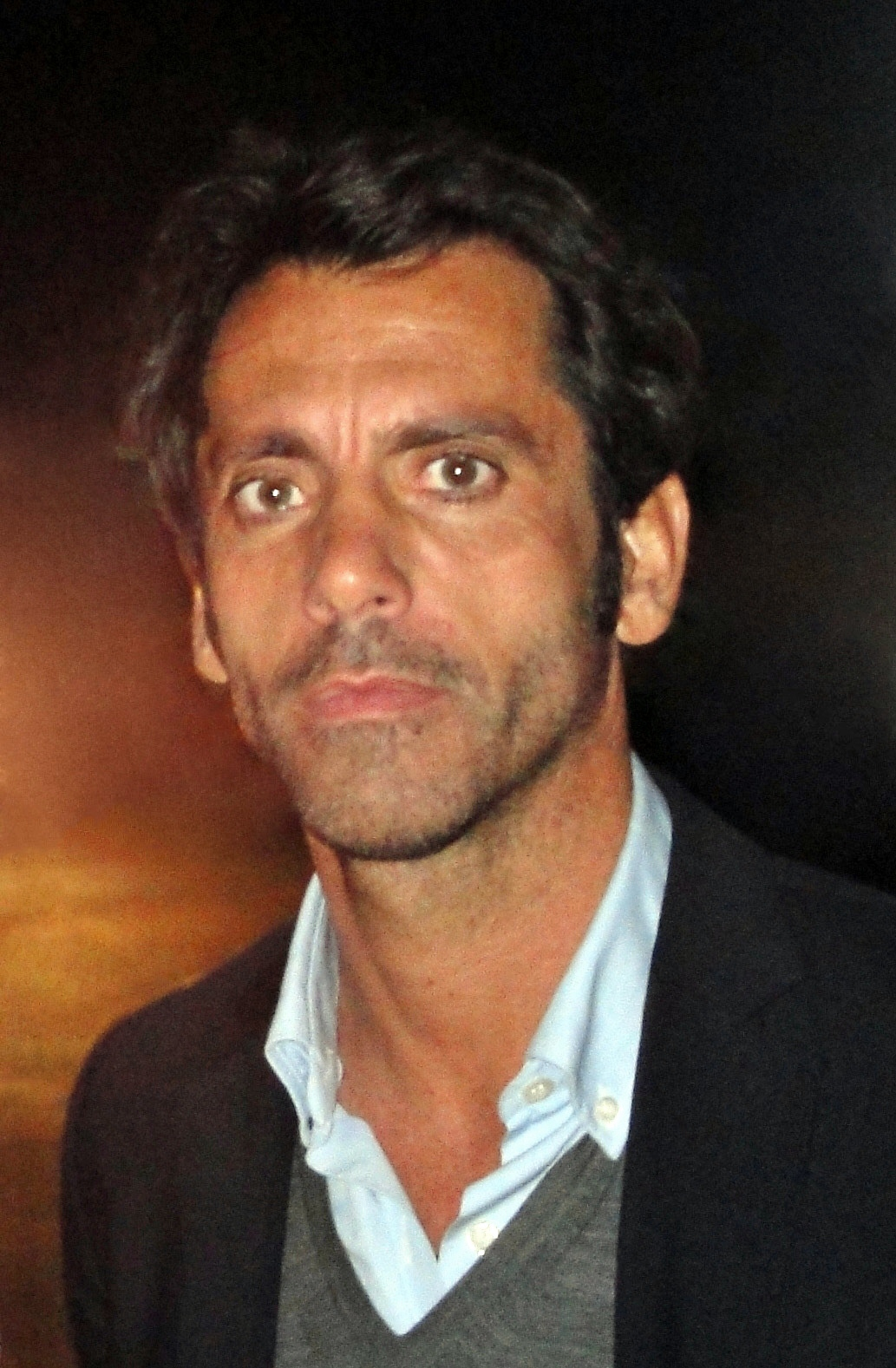
Quique Flores sacked after disappointing results

=== August ===
On 1 August, Al Ain announced reached an agreement with Lyon over the transfer of Brazilian midfielder, Michel Bastos. Reportedly Al Ain agree to pay €4 million fee for Bastos. On 30 August Al Ain FC were defeated by Al Ahli on penalties after a 0–0 in the 2013 UAE Super Cup at the Mohammed Bin Zayed Stadium.

=== September ===
On 4 September, Al Ain kicked off League Cup with a disappointing 3–1 away loss to Baniyas. On 7 September, Jires Kembo Ekoko joined Qatari club El Jaish for a one-season loan. After two defeats in a row, Al Ain confidently win The Derby a 3–0 over Al Wahda. On 13 September, Al Ain sack Jorge Fossati after seven weeks, due his philosophy and style of play did not suitable with the team and assigned temporarily Ahmed Abdullah, reserve team manager. On 27 September, Quique Flores arrived at Al Ain on Friday to be the new coach on a two-year deal.

== Players ==
=== First Team ===
No.	Nationality	Position(s)	Name	Since	Date of birth(Age)	Signed from	Games	Goals
Goalkeepers
—	GK	UAE	Waleed Salem	2001	28 October 1980 (age 45)	(United Arab Emirates) Al Ain Youth system	57	0
17	GK	UAE	Khalid Essa	2013	15 September 1989 (age 37)	(United Arab Emirates) Al Jazira	1	0
36	GK	UAE	Dawoud Sulaiman	2010	21 March 1990 (age 36)	(United Arab Emirates) Al Ain Youth system	63	0
Defenders
5	DF	UAE	Ismail Ahmed	2008	7 July 1983 (age 43)	(Morocco) FUS de Rabat	115	14
14	DF	UAE	Mohammed Fayez	2007	6 October 1989 (age 36)	(United Arab Emirates) Al Ain Youth system	43	0
15	DF	UAE	Khaled Abdulrahman	2009	10 September 1988 (age 38)	(United Arab Emirates) Al Ain Youth system	67	0
21	DF	UAE	Fawzi Fayez	2007	14 July 1987 (age 39)	(United Arab Emirates) Al Ain Youth system	82	3
19	DF	UAE	Mohanad Salem	2008	1 March 1985 (age 41)	(United Arab Emirates) Al Dhafra	115	4
23	DF	UAE	Mohamed Ahmed	2012	16 April 1989 (age 37)	(United Arab Emirates) Al Shabab	31	2
31	DF	UAE	Hazza Salem	2008	30 December 1989 (age 36)	(United Arab Emirates) Al Ain Youth system	60	2
44	DF	UAE	Faris Jumaa	2007	19 December 1988 (age 37)	(United Arab Emirates) Al Ain Youth system	133	7
50	DF	UAE	Mohammed Fayez	2007	6 November 1989 (age 36)	(United Arab Emirates) Al Ain Youth system	43	0
Midfielders
4	MF	UAE	Sultan Al Ghaferi	2013	18 September 1986 (age 40)	(United Arab Emirates) Baniyas	0	0
6	MF	ROU	Mirel Rădoi (3rd C)	2011	22 March 1981 (age 45)	(Saudi Arabia) Al Hilal	65	5
7	MF	UAE	Ali Al-Wehaibi (VC)	2001	27 October 1983 (age 42)	(United Arab Emirates) Al Ain Youth system	128	21
8	MF	BEL	Yassine El Ghanassy	2014	12 July 1990 (age 36)	(Belgium) Gent	7	1
10	MF	UAE	Omar Abdulrahman	2008	20 September 1991 (age 35)	(United Arab Emirates) Al Ain Youth system	81	25
18	MF	UAE	Ibrahim Diaky	2013	24 May 1982 (age 44)	(United Arab Emirates) Al Jazira	1	0
20	MF	UAE	Helal Saeed (C)	2011	24 March 1982 (age 44)	(United Arab Emirates) Al Jazira	58	0
25	MF	UAE	Ahmed Al Shamisi	2009	3 March 1988 (age 38)	(United Arab Emirates) Al Ain Youth system	28	2
27	MF	UAE	Salem Abdullah	2007	5 July 1986 (age 40)	(United Arab Emirates) Al Ain Youth system	71	7
30	MF	UAE	Mohammed Al Saadi	2011	28 October 1982 (age 43)	(United Arab Emirates) Al Dhafra	25	0
Forwards
3	FW	GHA	Asamoah Gyan	2011	22 November 1985 (age 40)	(England) Sunderland	47	56
11	FW	UAE	Abdulaziz Fayez	2009	17 September 1990 (age 36)	(United Arab Emirates) Al Ain Youth system	59	6
16	FW	UAE	Mohammed Abdulrahman	2008	4 February 1989 (age 37)	(United Arab Emirates) Al Ain Youth system	100	10
32	FW	AUS	Alex Brosque	2012	12 October 1983 (age 42)	(Japan) Shimizu S-Pulse	31	16

=== From Reserve and Youth Academy ===
No.	Nat	Position	Player	Since	Games	Goals
Reserve
1	GK	UAE	Saif Rashed	2013	0	0
2	DF	UAE	Mohammed Ali Ayed	2009	15	0
30	GK	UAE	Abdulla Sultan	2008	21	0
34	MF	UAE	Sultan Nasser	2010	9	0
26	MF	UAE	Hamad Al Meri	2010	19	2
26	DF	UAE	Abdulsalam Mohammed	2012	4	0
28	FW	UAE	Abdulla Al Sheeba	2012	1	0
38	DF	UAE	Saeed Mosabah	2012	1	0
39	MF	UAE	Saqr Mohammed	2013	0	0
37	FW	UAE	Faraj Juma	2010	8	0
40	GK	UAE	Mohamad Busanda	2013	0	0
42	DF	UAE	Fahad Juma	2012	1	0
64	MF	UAE	Ryan Yslam	2012	1	0
65	FW	UAE	Yousef Ahmed	2012	13	6
68	MF	UAE	Ahmed Barman	2013	2	0
Youth System
13	MF	UAE	Ahmed Sahel	2013	0	0
41	GK	UAE	Sultan Musabbeh	2009	1	0
45	FW	UAE	Khalifa Al Wahshi	2013	1	0
60	DF	UAE	Salem Al Azizi	2013	1	0
—	MF	UAE	Saleh Al Nuaimi	2013	0	0

== Transfers ==
=== In ===
No.	Pos.	Player	From	T.w	Type	T.fee	Source
4	CM	(United Arab Emirates) Sultan Al Ghaferi	(United Arab Emirates) Baniyas	S	Transfer	Free	AlAinFC.net
18	CM	(Ivory Coast) Ibrahim Diaky	(United Arab Emirates) Al Jazira	S	Transfer	€1.05M	AlAinFC.net
17	GK	(United Arab Emirates) Khalid Essa	(United Arab Emirates) Al Jazira	S	Transfer		AlAinFC.net
31	RB	(United Arab Emirates) Hazza Salem	(United Arab Emirates) Al Dhafra	S	L.return	—	
–	GK	(United Arab Emirates) Yousif Abdelrahman	(United Arab Emirates) Al Shaab	S	L.return	—	
8	LW	(Brazil) Michel Bastos	(France) Lyon	S	Transfer	€4M	AlAinFC.net
–	DM	(Belgium) Bakary Saré	(Russia) Dinamo Zagreb	W	Loan		TheNational.ae
8	FW	(Belgium) Yassine El Ghanassy	(Belgium) Gent	W	Loan		AGLeague.ae
–	GK	(United Arab Emirates) Waleed Salem	(United Arab Emirates) Al Ain	W	Re-registered		AGLeague.ae
–	DF	(United Arab Emirates) Fawzi Fayez	(United Arab Emirates) Al Ain	W	Re-registered		AGLeague.ae

Total spending: ▼€5.05 million + Yaqoub Al Hosani, Musallem Fayez

=== Out ===
No.	Pos.	Player	To	T.w	Type	T.fee	Source
2	CM	(United Arab Emirates) Yaqoub Al Hosani	(United Arab Emirates) Al Jazira	S	Swap	Free	ProLeague.ae
4	CB	(United Arab Emirates) Musallem Fayez	(United Arab Emirates) Al Jazira	S	Swap	Free	ProLeague.ae
29	FW	(United Arab Emirates) Mohamed Malallah	(United Arab Emirates) Al Shaab	S	C.termination	Free	AlShaabClub.ae
18	CM	(United Arab Emirates) Abdullah Malallah	(United Arab Emirates) Dubai	S	End of contract	Free	AlAinFC.net
–	LB	(United Arab Emirates) Saif Mohammed	(United Arab Emirates) Al Dhafra	S	Loan extension		ProLeague.ae
–	FW	(Argentina) Ignacio Scocco	(Brazil) Inter	S	Transfer	€4.95M	Internacional.com.br
30	GK	(United Arab Emirates) Abdulla Sultan	(United Arab Emirates) Al Dhafra	S	Transfer	Undisc.	DFSC.ae
14	CM	(United Arab Emirates) Bandar Al Ahbabi	(United Arab Emirates) Al Dhafra	S	Loan		Goal, AlAinFC
9	FW	(France) Kembo Ekoko	(Qatar) El Jaish	S	Loan	Undisc.	ElJaish.com
–	CB	(United Arab Emirates) Salim Sultan	(United Arab Emirates) Al-Wahda	S	Transfer	Undisc.	AlWahda-FC
8	LW	(Brazil) Michel Bastos	(Italy) A.S. Roma	W	Loan	€1,100,000	AGLeague.ae
22	GK	(United Arab Emirates) Mahmood Al Mas		W	Deregistered		AGLeague.ae
–	DF	(United Arab Emirates) Mohammed Ali Ayed	(United Arab Emirates) Al Shabab	W	Loan		AGLeague.ae
–	GK	(United Arab Emirates) Saif Rashed	(United Arab Emirates) Al Wasl	W	Loan		AGLeague.ae

Total income: ▲€6.05 million

== Pre-season and friendlies ==
Win Draw Loss

29 July 2013 AFIC	Al Ain (United Arab Emirates)	2 – 0	(Bahrain) Riffa	Al Ain, United Arab Emirates
10:15 GMT+4 (UAE Time)	F. Juma 70', 83'; S. Al menhali (yellow card) 73'	Report	(yellow card) 4' S. Al Dosari; (yellow card) 68' Mohamed	Stadium: Sheikh Khalifa International; Referee: Hamad Al Sheikh; Man of the Match: Faraj Juma

1 August 2013 AFIC	Al Ain (United Arab Emirates)	3 – 0	(Kuwait) Kazma	Al Ain, United Arab Emirates
10:15 GMT+4 (UAE Time)	Gyan 18' (yellow card) 61'; Diaky 48'; Fahad. J (yellow card) 70'; Salem. A 84'	Report		Stadium: Sheikh Khalifa International; Referee: Fahad Al Kassar; Man of the Match: Ibrahim Diaky

5 August 2013 AFIC	Al Ain (United Arab Emirates)	2 – 4	(Saudi Arabia) Al Hilal	Al Ain, United Arab Emirates
10:00 GMT+4 (UAE Time)	Ismail. A (yellow card) 9'; Gyan 67' (pen.); Bastos 78'; Salem. A (yellow card) 71'	Report	14', 39' (pen.) Al-Shamrani; 23' Castillo; 90+3' Hermach	Stadium: Sheikh Khalifa International; Referee: Mohammed Abdulkarim; Man of the Match: Michel Bastos

20 August 2013 Friendly	Šampion Celje (Slovenia)	0–2	(United Arab Emirates) Al Ain	Lienz, Austria
		Report	68' Bastos; 85' Abdulaziz	Stadium: Dolomiten Stadion; Referee: Triting Himlton

24 August 2013 Friendly	Al Ahli (Qatar)	2–0	(United Arab Emirates) Al Ain	Kapfenberg, Austria
	Dioko 24'; Hamzah 90'	Report		Stadium: Franz Fekete Stadium

15 May 2014 Friendly	Al Ain (United Arab Emirates)	0–3	(England) Manchester City	Abu Dhabi
19:50			Lopes 63'; Jovetić 79'; Hiwula 89' (pen.)	Stadium: Hazza Bin Zayed Stadium

== Competitions ==
=== Overview ===
Competition	First match	Last match	Starting round	Final position	Record							
Competition	First match	Last match	Starting round	Final position	Pld	W	D	L	GF	GA	GD	Win %
Pro League	15 September 2013	9 May 2014	Matchday 1	6th	26	12	7	7	52	33	+19	46.15
League Cup	4 September 2013	14 November 2013	Group stage	Group stage	6	3	1	2	11	9	+2	50.00
President's Cup	10 December 2013	18 May 2014	Round of 16	Winners	4	4	0	0	9	4	+5	100.00
Super Cup	30 August 2013		Final	Runner-up	1	0	0	1	0	0	+0	0.00
Champions League	26 February 2014	30 September 2014	Group stage	Semi-finals	12	8	2	2	25	14	+11	66.67
Total					49	27	10	12	97	60	+37	55.10

Last updated: 30 September 2014
Source: Competitions

=== Arabian Gulf League ===
==== League table ====
Pos	Team	Pld	W	D	L	GF	GA	GD	Pts	Qualification or relegation
4	Al Shabab	26	13	5	8	42	28	+14	44	2015 GCC Champions League group stage
5	Al Nasr	26	13	5	8	42	32	+10	44	2015 GCC Champions League group stage
6	Al Ain	26	12	7	7	52	33	+19	43	2015 AFC Champions League group stage (Note: Al Ain qualified through winning the Presidents Cup.)
7	Al Sharjah	26	10	10	6	29	25	+4	40	
8	Al-Dhafra	26	9	8	9	44	44	0	35	

Updated to match(es) played on 11 May 2014. Source: Arabian Gulf League 2013-2014 table
Rules for classification: 1) points; 2) goal difference; 3) number of goals scored.

==== Results summary ====
Overall								Home						Away					
Pld	W	D	L	GF	GA	GD	Pts	W	D	L	GF	GA	GD	W	D	L	GF	GA	GD
26	12	7	7	52	33	+19	43	7	4	2	31	18	+13	5	3	5	21	15	+6

Last updated: 9 May 2014.
Source: Competitive matches

==== Results by round ====
Round	1	2	3	4	5	6	7	8	9	10	11	12	13	14	15	16	17	18	19	20	21	22	23	24	25	26
Ground	A	H	A	H	A	H	A	H	A	H	H	A	H	H	A	H	A	H	A	H	A	H	A	A	H	A
Result	L	W	L	W	D	W	L	W	D	W	D	L	W	D	D	D	W	L	L	L	W	W	W	W	D	W
Position	13	9	9	7	8	4	10	4	5	3	6	6	6	7	7	7	5	6	8	8	7	7	4	5	6	6

Updated to match(es) played on 9 May 2014. Source: UAEProLeague
A = Away; H = Home; W = Win; D = Draw; L = Loss

==== Matches ====
15 September 2013 1	Al Shabab	3–1	Al Ain	Dubai
20:30	Adeílson 21', 63'; Hassan.H (yellow card) 63'; Edgar 69' (yellow card) 84'	Report	(yellow card) 42' Khalid.E; 45+1' (red card) 66' Mohanad; (yellow card) 49' Fares.J; (yellow card) 70' Radoi; (yellow card) 90+4' Yousef.A	Stadium: Maktoum Bin Rashid Al Maktoum; Referee: Hamad Al Shaikh

20 September 2013 2	Al Ain	2–1	Ajman	Al Ain
17:30	Gyan 20', 25'; Bastos (yellow card) 28'; Khalid.E (yellow card) 85'; Al Ghaferi (yellow card) 87'	Report	77' Simon; (yellow card) 83' Waleed.A	Stadium: Tahnoun bin Mohammed; Attendance: 2,322; Referee: Ahmad Khalfan

27 September 2013 3	Al Dhafra	4–3	Al Ain	Abu Dhabi
17:35	E.Clottey 53', 61', 84'; Makhete 67' (yellow card) 68'; H.Zahran (yellow card) 70'; A.Alnaqbi (yellow card) 70'	Report	8' Bastos; (yellow card) 45+1' Mohanad; 72', 74' Gyan; (yellow card) 76' Fares.J; (yellow card) 80' Ismail	Stadium: Hamdan bin Zayed Al Nahyan; Referee: Abdulwahid Qhater

19 October 2013 4	Al Ain	5–2	Dubai	Al Ain
17:00	Ismail 19'; Gyan 52', 56', 72'; Brosque 69'	Report	48' R.Yaslam; 68' Traore	Stadium: Tahnoun bin Mohammed; Referee: Abdulla Al Aajel

25 October 2013 5	Al Wahda	1–1	Al Ain	Abu Dhabi
20:30	Estrada (yellow card) 16' (goal) 65'; Mubarak (yellow card) 27'; Eissa (yellow card) 78'	Report	(yellow card) 9' Diaky; (yellow card) 42' Radoi; 47' Bastos; (yellow card) 88' Omar.A	Stadium: Al Nahyan Stadium; Referee: Ammar Ali Al Junaibi

31 October 2013 6	Al Ain	3–2	Al Nasr	Al Ain
20:30	Diaky (yellow card) 21'; Gyan 40'; Ismail (yellow card) 67'; Omar.A 72'; Fares.J 90+3'	Report	(yellow card) 32' K.Alajmani; (yellow card) 39' R.Malullah; 48' Ibrahima.T; (yellow card) 56' Lima; (yellow card) 73' Mahmoud.H; (yellow card) 78' Tariq.A; 81' Eder; (yellow card) 90' Yousif	Stadium: Tahnoun bin Mohammed; Referee: Hamad Al Shaikh

24 November 2013 7	Al Ahli	1–0	Al Ain	Dubai
20:00	Grafite 32'; Haikal (yellow card) 45+2'; Jiménez (yellow card) 65'	Report	(yellow card) 5' Diaky; (yellow card) 28' Ismail; (yellow card) 44' Omar.A; (yellow card) 89' Brosque	Stadium: Al-Rashid Stadium; Referee: Mohamed Abdulkarim

29 November 2013 8	Al Ain	5–2	Emirates	Al Ain
16:45	Bastos 9'; Mohanad 21'; Brosque 28'; Ahmed Al Shamisi (yellow card) 36'; Gyan 45', 68'	Report	52', 79' Herrera	Stadium: Tahnoun bin Mohammed; Referee: Yaqoub Qaseem Al Hammadi

5 December 2013 9	Baniyas	1–1	Al Ain	Abu Dhabi
16:50	M.Fawzi (yellow card) 43'; Fawaz.A 52' (yellow card) 65'; Muñoz (yellow card) 45+1'; Haboush (yellow card) 45+3'	Report	(yellow card) 85' Hazza.S; 79' (yellow card) 90+3' Gyan	Stadium: Baniyas Stadium; Referee: Hamad Al Shaikh

15 December 2013 10	Al Ain	5–2	Al Shaab	Al Ain
16:45	Gyan 22', 76'; Diaky (yellow card) 33'; Mohanad 45+2'; Bastos 55'; Brosque 58'	Report	(yellow card) 21' F.Rushoud; 45', 78' Ndri.M; (yellow card) 72' J.Sanqoor	Stadium: Tahnoun bin Mohammed; Referee: Ammar Al Junaibi

20 December 2013 11	Al Ain	1–1	Al Sharjah	Al Ain
16:45	Gyan 27'; Ismail (yellow card) 81'	Report	11' Y.Saeed; (yellow card) 37' A.Darwish; (yellow card) 44' A.Al Saadi; (yellow card) 46' A.Ahmed; (yellow card) 89' M.Khalifa	Stadium: Tahnoun bin Mohammed; Referee: Hamad Al Shaikh

27 December 2013 12	Al Jazira	2–1	Al Ain	Abu Dhabi
20:30	Juma.A 63'; A.Qasem 77'; Khamis.E (yellow card) 80'	Report	44' Gyan; (yellow card) 68' Omar.A	Stadium: Mohammed Bin Zayed; Referee: Abdulla Al Aajel

3 January 2014 13	Al Ain	3–0	Al Wasl	Al Ain
20:00	Gyan 13'; Mohanad 41'; Omar.A (yellow card) 55'; Brosque 72'	Report	(yellow card) 10' Al Hosani; (yellow card) 68' F.Hadeed; (yellow card) 75' Waheed; (yellow card) 79' Susak; (yellow card) 85' M.Jamal	Stadium: Tahnoun bin Mohammed; Referee: Yaqoub Al Hammadi

9 January 2014 14	Al Ain	0–0	Al Shabab	Al Ain
20:00	Hazza.S (yellow card) 77'	Report	(yellow card) 52' Sami	Stadium: Tahnoun bin Mohammed; Referee: Ammar Ali Al Junaibi

18 January 2014 15	Ajman	0–0	Al Ain	Ajman
17:05	A.Hassan (yellow card) 73'	Report	(yellow card) 78' Mohammed.A	Stadium: Ajman Stadium; Referee: Abdulla Al Aajel

24 January 2014 16	Al Ain	1–1	Al Dhafra	Al Ain
17:10	Gyan 75'; Mohammed.F (yellow card) 90+1'	Report	(yellow card) 11' H.Al Hammadi; (yellow card) 69' Mohd.Ali; 83' Makhete; (yellow card) 85' A.Abdulqader	Stadium: Hazza Bin Zayed; Referee: Abdulwahid Qhater

6 February 2014 17	Dubai	0–3	Al Ain	Dubai
17:20	S.Saidi (yellow card) 10'	Report	(yellow card) 9' Ismail; 17', 49' Gyan; (yellow card) 61' Mohammed.F; (yellow card) 69' Fares.J; 79' El Ghanassy	Stadium: Police Officers Club; Referee: Adel Al Naqbi

13 February 2014 18	Al Ain	0–1	Al Wahda	Al Ain
20:15	Hazza.S (yellow card) 80'	Report	13' Tagliabue; (yellow card) 59' Al Nobi; (yellow card) 73' Hussain.F; (yellow card) 90+4' Damián	Stadium: Hazza Bin Zayed; Referee: Yaqoub Al Hammadi

21 February 2014 19	Al Nasr	1–0	Al Ain	Dubai
17:30	Ibrahima.T 74'; Al Husain (yellow card) 90+3'	Report	(yellow card) 75' Brosque; (yellow card) 90+2' Mohammed.F; (red card) Radoi	Stadium: Al-Maktoum Stadium; Referee: Mohamed Abdulla

23 March 2014 20	Al Ain	2–3	Al Ahli	Al Ain
20:30	Khalid.E (yellow card) 35'; Mohanad (yellow card) 53'; M.Ahmed (yellow card) 72'; Gyan 78'; Ismail 90+3'	Report	36', 47' Grafite; 75' I.Al Hammadi; 83' Haikal; 86' Salmeen; 90+2' A.Khalil	Stadium: Hazza Bin Zayed; Referee: Yaqoub Al Hammadi

27 March 2014 21	Emirates	1–2	Al Ain	Ras al-Khaimah
17:45	Luiz (yellow card) 35'; Masoud.H 63'; A.Saqr (yellow card) 66'	Report	(yellow card) 35' Omar.A; (yellow card) 42' Diaky; 56', 66' Gyan; (yellow card) 81' Mohamed.A; (yellow card) 85' Salem.A; (yellow card) 90+2' Mohammed.F	Stadium: Emirates Club Stadium; Referee: Hamad Al Shaikh

6 April 2014 22	Al Ain	2–1	Baniyas	Al Ain
17:50	Fares.J 53' (red card) 90+1'; Hazza.S (yellow card) 66'; Brosque 69'; M.Ahmed 79'	Report	3' (yellow card) 71' M.Fawzi; (red card) 90+1' Muñoz	Stadium: Hazza Bin Zayed; Referee: Hamad Ali

10 April 2014 23	Al Shaab	0–5	Al Ain	Sharjah
17:55	Gyan 12', 45+2', 90+2'; Mohammed. A 51'; Ryan.Y 80'	Report	(yellow card) 83' Humaid. A (yellow card) 90+1' Ndri.M	Stadium: Khalid Bin Mohammed; Referee: Abdulla Al Aajel

27 April 2014 24	Al Sharjah	1–3	Al Ain	Sharjah
19:30	Shahin 1'; Al Saadi (yellow card) 8'; Yousif (yellow card) 44'	Report	(yellow card) 63' Barman; 71' Diaky; 72', 90' Gyan	Stadium: Sharjah Stadium; Referee: Sultan Al Marzouqi

1 May 2014 25	Al Ain	2–2	Al Jazira	Al Ain
20:45	Fawzi.F (yellow card) 14' (red card) 80'; Gyan 21', 42'; El Ghanassy (yellow card) 90+1'	Report	67' Caicedo; 76' Khalid.S; 80' A.Mabkhout	Stadium: Hazza Bin Zayed; Referee: Abdulla Al Aajel

9 May 2014 26	Al Wasl	0–1	Al Ain	Dubai
18:05	Yaser (yellow card) 22'; M.Al Sumiti (yellow card) 81'; Oliveira (yellow card) 90+3'; Culio (yellow card) 90+3'	Report	55' Mohanad; 90+4' Gyan	Stadium: Za'abeel Stadium; Referee: Ahmad Salem

Last updated: 9 May 2014
Source: AGLeague.ae

=== Super Cup ===
30 August 2013 Final	Al Ain	0–0 (2–3 p)	Al Ahli	Abu Dhabi
19:25 GMT+4 (UAE Time)	Rădoi (yellow card) 6'; Mohamed. A (yellow card) 23'; Al Shamisi (yellow card) 80'; Fares (yellow card) 85'	Report	(yellow card) 9' A. Khalil; (red card) 90' M. Hassan; (yellow card) 90+3' Majed. N	Stadium: Mohammed Bin Zayed; Attendance: 29,874; Referee: Abdullah Al Ajel
	Penalties
	Gyan (penalty scored); Omar. A (penalty missed); Al Shamisi (penalty missed); Fares (penalty scored); Diaky (penalty missed)		(penalty missed) Jiménez; (penalty scored) Ciel; (penalty scored) Viana; (penalty scored) Sanqour

=== President's Cup ===
10 December 2013 Round of 16	Al Ain	4–1	Sharjah	Abu Dhabi
16:45 GMT+4 (UAE Time)	Hazza (yellow card) 29'; Gyan 45', 69', 90+1' (pen.); Ramos 61' (o.g.); Almas (yellow card) 69'; Khaled .A (yellow card) 76'; Ismail (yellow card) 86'; Omar (yellow card) 90+2'	Report	Zé Carlos 3'; Shahin (yellow card) 75' (yellow-red card) 81'	Stadium: Mohammed bin Zayed Stadium; Referee: Yaqoub Al Hammadi

13 January 2014 Quarter-finals	Al Ain	2–2 (a.e.t.) (9–8 p)	Al Wasl	Abu Dhabi
20:05 GMT+4 (UAE Time)	Ismail (yellow card) 25'; Brosque 35' (yellow card) 100'; Gyan 60' (pen.); Helal .S (yellow card) 73'	Report	Gyan 10' (o.g.); Donda 26' (pen.) (yellow card) 62'; Culio (yellow card) 33'; Rashed .A (yellow card) 58'	Stadium: Mohammed bin Zayed Stadium; Referee: Ahmed Salim
	Penalties
	Brosque (penalty missed); Omar (penalty missed); Gyan (penalty scored); Rădoi (penalty scored); Salem .A (penalty scored); Fares .J (penalty scored); Ismail (penalty scored); Al Shamisi (penalty scored); Mohanad (penalty scored); Mohamed .A (penalty scored); Khalid .E (penalty scored)		(penalty scored) Culio; (penalty scored) Puch; (penalty missed) Donda; (penalty missed) Senghor; (penalty scored) Hadeed; (penalty scored) Darwish .A; (penalty scored) Yasser .S; (penalty scored) Bin Lahej; (penalty scored) Malallah; (penalty scored) Zahran; (penalty missed) Rashed .A

30 January 2014 Semi-finals	Al Ain	2–1	Al Nasr	Abu Dhabi
20:00 GMT+4 (UAE Time)	Malallah 32' (o.g.); Gyan 86'	Report	Touré (yellow card) 68'; Holman 83'	Stadium: Zayed Sports City Stadium; Referee: Mohamed Abdullah

18 May 2014 Final	Al Ain	1–0	Al Ahli	Abu Dhabi
18:15 GMT+4 (UAE Time)	Gyan 32'; Helal .S (yellow card) 84'; Omar (yellow card) 87'; Barman (yellow card) 92'	Report	Majed.H (yellow card) 4'; Saeed.B (yellow card) 52'; Haikal (yellow card) 90'; Ciel (yellow card) 93'	Stadium: Zayed Sports City Stadium; Referee: Ammar Al Junaibi

=== League Cup ===
==== Group stage ====
===== Group A =====
Team	Pld	W	D	L	GF	GA	GD	Pts
Sharjah	6	5	1	0	11	2	+9	16
Al Jazira	6	4	0	2	9	9	0	12
Al Ain	6	3	1	2	11	9	+2	10
Bani Yas	6	3	1	2	9	7	+2	10
Al Shaab	6	1	2	3	7	10	−3	5
Dubai	6	1	1	4	6	10	−4	4
Al Wahda	6	1	0	5	3	9	−6	3

Source: Soccerway

==== Matches ====
4 September 2013 1	Baniyas	3–1	Al Ain	Baniyas Stadium, Abu Dhabi
20:30	Fawaz 14'; Nawaf (52 .pen), 60'	Report	(yellow card) 50' Salem.A (58 .pen) Mohamed.A	Referee: Mohammed Abdulkarim

9 September 2013 2	Al Ain	3–0	Al Wahda	Tahnoun bin Mohammed, Al Ain
20:30	Diaky 25'; Mohamed.A (yellow card) 27' (goal) 49', 59'; Khaled.A (yellow card) 39'; Fares.J (yellow card) 63'; Bastos (yellow card) 90+3'	Report		Attendance: 2,234; Referee: Yaqoub Al Hammadi

4 October 2013 3	Al Shaab	1–3	Al Ain	Khalid Bin Mohammed Stadium, Sharjah
17:15	Julius Wobay 10'	Report	(yellow card) 38' (goal) 50' Rădoi; (yellow card) 45' Mohamed.A; 72' Fares.J; 82' Bastos	Referee: Adel Al Naqbi

10 October 2013 4	Al Ain	2–2	Al Sharjah	Tahnoun bin Mohammed, Al Ain
20:30	Mohamed.A (yellow card) 21'; Diaky 27'; Brosque 39' (yellow card) 45+1'; Fares.J (yellow card) 68'; Radoi (yellow card) 73'; Dawoud (yellow card) 90+1'	Report	19', 71' Ze.Carlos; (yellow card) 59' Bader Abdulrahman	Referee: Abdulla Najee Al Harth

7 November 2013 5	Al Jazira	3–1	Al Ain	Mohammed Bin Zayed Stadium, Abu Dhabi
20:30	Oliveira (yellow card) 45' (goal) 78', 85'; A.Mousa (yellow card) 71'; Yaser Matar 90+3'	Report	(yellow card) 24' Fares.J; 36' Diaky; (yellow card) 90+3' Radoi	Referee: Abdulla Al Aajel

14 November 2013 6	Al Ain	1–0	Dubai	Tahnoun bin Mohammed, Al Ain
16:45	M. Ayed (yellow card) 55'; S. Al Ghafer 90+6'	Report	(yellow card) 41' Yousuf Hassn; (yellow card) 78' Mohamed Ibrahim; (yellow card) 90+5' Hussain Abdulrahman	Referee: Hamad Ali

Last updated: 17 November 2013
Source: AGLeague.ae

=== AFC Champions League ===
==== Group C ====
Pos	Team	Pld	W	D	L	GF	GA	GD	Pts	Qualification	AIN	ITT	LEK	TRA
1	(United Arab Emirates) Al-Ain	6	3	2	1	14	7	+7	11	Advance to knockout stage	—	1–1	2–1	3–1
2	(Saudi Arabia) Al-Ittihad	6	3	1	2	8	6	+2	10	Advance to knockout stage	2–1	—	3–1	2–0
3	(Qatar) Lekhwiya	6	2	1	3	5	10	−5	7		0–5	2–0	—	0–0
4	(Iran) Tractor Sazi	6	1	2	3	4	8	−4	5		2–2	1–0	0–1	—

Source: Soccerway

26 February 2014 1	Al-Ain (United Arab Emirates)	2–1	(Qatar) Lekhwiya	Hazza Bin Zayed Stadium, Al Ain
20:00 UTC+4	Barman (yellow card) 6'; Diaky 13' (yellow card) 28'; Gyan 65'; Brosque (yellow card) 90+3'	Report	Weiss 40' (yellow card) 73'; Musa (yellow card) 40'; Tae-hee (yellow card) 58'	Attendance: 4,936; Referee: Peter Green (Australia)

12 March 2014 2	Al-Ittihad (Saudi Arabia)	2–1	(United Arab Emirates) Al-Ain	King Abdul Aziz Stadium, Mecca
20:20 UTC+3	Fallatah 68', 75'	Report	Gyan 38'; Barman (yellow card) 43'; F.Jumaa (yellow card) 53'	Attendance: 16,571; Referee: Kim Jong-Hyeok (South Korea)

18 March 2014 3	Al-Ain (United Arab Emirates)	3–1	(Iran) Tractor Sazi	Hazza Bin Zayed Stadium, Al Ain
20:15 UTC+4	Gyan 16', 73'; Diaky (yellow card) 20'; M. Abdulrahman 37'; M.Ahmed (yellow card) 82'	Report	Fakhreddini 42'; Ahmadzadeh (yellow card) 85'; Ansarifard (yellow card) 90+4'	Attendance: 7,103; Referee: Jumpei Iida (Japan)

1 April 2014 4	Tractor Sazi (Iran)	2–2	(United Arab Emirates) Al-Ain	Sahand Stadium, Tabriz
19:00 UTC+4:30	Daghighi 20'; Gordani (yellow card) 46'; Ahmadzadeh 61' (yellow card) 61'; Kiani (yellow card) 63'	Report	M.Ahmed (yellow card) 30'; Gyan 54'; M. Abdulrahman 59'; H.Saeed (yellow card) 83'	Attendance: 39,120; Referee: Muhammad Taqi Aljaafari Bin Jahari (Singapore)

15 April 2014 5	Lekhwiya (Qatar)	0–5	(United Arab Emirates) Al-Ain	Abdullah bin Khalifa Stadium, Doha
18:30 UTC+3	Ceará (yellow card) 72'	Report	Diaky 26'; Brosque 43'; M. Abdulrahman 57'; Gyan 70', 90+2'	Attendance: 3,850; Referee: Strebre Delovski (Australia)

22 April 2014 6	Al-Ain (United Arab Emirates)	1–1	(Saudi Arabia) Al-Ittihad	Hazza Bin Zayed Stadium, Al Ain
19:30 UTC+4	Sharahili 22' (o.g.); Omar .A (yellow card) 34'; F. Fayez (yellow card) 64'	Report	Khodari (yellow card) 16'; Abdelghani (yellow card) 24'; Al-Ghamdi (yellow card) 31' (goal) 36' (pen.)	Attendance: 8,606; Referee: Kim Sang-woo (South Korea)

==== Knockout phase ====
===== Round of 16 =====
6 May 2014 First leg	Al-Jazira (United Arab Emirates)	1–2	(United Arab Emirates) Al-Ain	Mohammed Bin Zayed Stadium, Abu Dhabi
20:00 UTC+4	Mousa (yellow card) 36'; Sebil (yellow card) 40'; Qasem (yellow card) 49'; Fayez 58'	Report	Gyan 11' (yellow card) 81'; O. Abdulrahman 15'; H.Saeed (yellow card) 35'	Attendance: 18,650; Referee: Kim Jong-hyeok (South Korea)

13 May 2014 Second leg	Al-Ain (United Arab Emirates)	2–1	(United Arab Emirates) Al-Jazira	Hazza Bin Zayed Stadium, Al Ain
20:00 UTC+4	Gyan 61', 81'	Report	Mabkhout 17'; Ibrahim (yellow card) 36'; K. Esmaeel (yellow card) 53'; Barrada (yellow card) 75'; Khasif (yellow card) 75'; Bargash (yellow card) 90+2'	Attendance: 9,379; Referee: Valentin Kovalenko (Uzbekistan)

Al-Ain won 4–2 on aggregate.

===== Quarter-finals =====
19 August 2014 First leg	Al-Ain (United Arab Emirates)	2–0	(Saudi Arabia) Al-Ittihad	Hazza Bin Zayed Stadium, Al Ain
20:00 UTC+4	O. Abdulrahman (yellow card) 19'; Ismail 48'; Gyan 61'	Report	Al-Muwallad (yellow card) 25'; Marquinho (yellow card) 28'; Al-Dmeiri (yellow card) 42'; Al-Absi (yellow card) 78'; Bajandouh (yellow card) 83'	Attendance: 18,830; Referee: Abdullah Al Hilali (Oman)

26 August 2014 Second leg	Al-Ittihad (Saudi Arabia)	1–3	(United Arab Emirates) Al-Ain	King Abdul Aziz Stadium, Mecca
20:50 UTC+3	Al Qumaizi (yellow card) 5'; Ismail 35' (o.g.); Al-Ghamdi (yellow card) 51'	Report	Gyan 40'; M. Ahmed (yellow card) 56'; O. Abdulrahman 66'; Diaky 84'	Attendance: 342; Referee: Peter Green (Australia)

Al-Ain won 5–1 on aggregate.

===== Semi-finals =====
16 September 2014 First leg	Al-Hilal (Saudi Arabia)	3–0	(United Arab Emirates) Al-Ain	King Fahd International Stadium, Riyadh
20:30 UTC+3	Al-Faraj (yellow card) 44'; Tae-hwi (yellow card) 51'; Al-Shamrani 61', 64'; Neves 70'	Report	Barman (yellow card) 60'; K. Eisa (red card) 66'	Attendance: 57,170; Referee: Masaaki Toma (Japan)

30 September 2014 Second leg	Al-Ain (United Arab Emirates)	2–1	(Saudi Arabia) Al-Hilal	Hazza Bin Zayed Stadium, Al Ain
19:15 UTC+4	Myung-joo 10'; Kembo 78'; Stoch (yellow card) 69'; Gyan (red card) 70'	Report	Al-Shamrani 66' (yellow card) 71'; Al-Shahrani (yellow card) 75'; Al-Qahtani (yellow card) 85'	Attendance: 24,204; Referee: Ravshan Irmatov (Uzbekistan)

Al-Hilal won 4–2 on aggregate.

== Statistics ==
=== Squad Stats ===
	League	Asia	Cup	League Cup	Super cup	Total Stats
Games played	26	12	4	6	1	49
Games won	12	8	4	3	0	27
Games drawn	7	2	0	1	0	10
Games lost	7	2	0	2	1	12
Goals for	52	25	9	11	0	97
Goals against	33	14	4	9	0	60
Yellow cards	51	17	11	15	4	98
Red cards	4	2	0	0	0	6

Last updated: 30 September 2014
Source: Competitive matches

=== Goalscorers ===
Rnk	No.	Pos	Player	League	League Cup	President's Cup	Champions League	Super Cup	Total
1	3	FW	(Ghana) Asamoah Gyan	29		6	12		47
2	16	FW	(United Arab Emirates) Mohamed Abdulrahman	1	3		3		7
—	32	FW	(Australia) Alex Brosque	4	1	1	1		7
—	18	MF	(United Arab Emirates) Ibrahim Diaky	1	3		3		7
6	8	MF	(Brazil) Michel Bastos	4	1				5
7	19	DF	(United Arab Emirates) Mohanad Salem	4					4
—	5	DF	(United Arab Emirates) Ismail Ahmed	3			1		4
8	44	DF	(United Arab Emirates) Fares Juma	2	1				3
—	10	MF	(United Arab Emirates) Omar Abdulrahman	1			2		3
9	9	FW	(France) Kembo Ekoko				1		1
—	29	MF	(South Korea) Lee Myung-joo				1		1
—	43	MF	(United Arab Emirates) Rayan Yaslam	1					1
—	8	FW	(Belgium) Yassine El Ghanassy	1					1
—	4	MF	(United Arab Emirates) Sultan Al Ghaferi		1				1
—	6	MF	(Romania) Mirel Radoi		1				1
—	31	DF	(United Arab Emirates) Hazza Salem	1					1
Own Goals						1	1		2
TOTALS				52	11	8	25		96

Last updated: 30 September 2014
Source: Competitive matches

=== Assists ===
R	Player	Position	League	League Cup	President's Cup	Champions League	Super Cup	Total
1	(United Arab Emirates) Omar Abdulrahman	AM	17	0	2	4	0	23
2	(United Arab Emirates) Ahmed Al Shamisi	DM	4	1	0	0	0	5
3	(Ivory Coast) Ibrahim Diaky	CM	0	1	0	3	0	4
3	(Belgium) Yassine El Ghanassy	FW	4	0	0	1	0	4
3	(Ghana) Asamoah Gyan	FW	2	0	0	2	0	4
6	(United Arab Emirates) Mohamed Abdulrahman	FW	2	0	0	1	0	3
6	(Brazil) Michel Bastos	LW	3	0	0	0	0	3
6	(United Arab Emirates) Mohammed Fayez	LB	1	0	0	2	0	3
9	(United Arab Emirates) Khaled Abdulrahman	LB	2	0	0	0	0	2
9	(Australia) Alex Brosque	FW	2	0	0	0	0	2
9	(Romania) Mirel Rădoi	DM	1	0	0	1	0	2
12	(United Arab Emirates) Abdulsalam Mohammed	RB	0	1	0	0	0	1
12	(United Arab Emirates) Ismail Ahmed	CB	0	0	0	1	0	1

Last updated: 18 May 2014
Source: Competitive matches

=== Disciplinary record ===
N	P	Nat.	Name	League			League Cup			President's Cup			Champions League			Super Cup			Total			Notes
N	P	Nat.	Name	Yellow card	Second yellow card	Red card	Yellow card	Second yellow card	Red card	Yellow card	Second yellow card	Red card	Yellow card	Second yellow card	Red card	Yellow card	Second yellow card	Red card	Yellow card	Second yellow card	Red card	Notes
2	DF	(United Arab Emirates)	M.Ayed	1															1			
3	FW	(Ghana)	Gyan	1									1						2			
4	MF	(United Arab Emirates)	S.Al Ghaferi	1															1			
5	DF	(United Arab Emirates)	Ismail	5						2									7			
6	MF	(Romania)	Rădoi	2		1	3									1			6		1	
8	MF	(Brazil)	Bastos	1			1												2			
8	MF	(Belgium)	El Ghanassy	1															1			
10	MF	(United Arab Emirates)	Omar.A	5						2			1						8			
15	DF	(United Arab Emirates)	Khaled.A				1			1									2			
16	FW	(United Arab Emirates)	Mohamed.A	2			3												5			
17	GK	(United Arab Emirates)	Khalid.E	3															3			
18	MF	(Ivory Coast)	Diaky	5									2						7			
19	DF	(United Arab Emirates)	Mohanad	2		1													2		1	
20	MF	(United Arab Emirates)	Helal.S							1			2						3			
21	DF	(United Arab Emirates)	Fawzi.F	2	1								1						3	1		
22	GK	(United Arab Emirates)	Al Mas							1									1			
23	DF	(United Arab Emirates)	M.Ahmed	2									2			1			5			
24	MF	(United Arab Emirates)	A.Barman	1						1			2						4			
25	MF	(United Arab Emirates)	Ahmed.A	2												1			3			
27	MF	(United Arab Emirates)	Salem.A	1			1												2			
31	DF	(United Arab Emirates)	Hazza.S	3						1									4			
32	FW	(Australia)	Brosque	3			1						1						5			
35	FW	(United Arab Emirates)	Yousef.A	1															1			
36	GK	(United Arab Emirates)	Dawoud				1												1			
44	DF	(United Arab Emirates)	Fares.J	3		1	3						1			1			8		1	
50	DF	(United Arab Emirates)	Mohammed.F	4															4			

Last updated: 18 May 2014
Source: Competitive matches and AGLeague.ae
Only competitive matches
Ordered by (red card) , (second yellow card) and (yellow card)
(yellow card) = Number of bookings; (second yellow card) = Number of sending offs after a second yellow card; (red card) = Number of sending offs by a direct red card.
