= 2014–15 Al Ain FC season =

Al Ain
2014–15 season
- President: Mohammed Bin Zayed
- Manager: Zlatko Dalić
- Stadium: Hazza Bin Zayed, Al Ain
- UAE Pro-League: 1st
- UAE Super Cup: Runners–up
- President's Cup: Quarter-finals
- League Cup: Group stage
- AFC Champions League: Round of 16
- Top goalscorer: League: Asamoah Gyan (13); All: Asamoah Gyan (22)
- Highest home attendance: 24,204 vs Al-Hilal (30 September 2014)
- Lowest home attendance: 1,386 vs Ittihad Kalba (9 October 2014)
- Average home league attendance: 18,830 vs Al-Ittihad (19 August 2014)
Home colours	Away colours	Third colours

The 2014–15 season was Al Ain Football Club's 47th in existence and the club's 40th consecutive season in the top-level football league in the UAE.

== Season overview ==
=== June ===
On 10 June, Al Ain announced its first two signing of the season by reached an agreement with Pohang Steelers to get Lee Myung-Joo for a three-year deal and Rashed Eisa for a one-season loan from Al Wasl FC in exchange deal of joining Salem Abdullah and Hazza Salem for loan. On 23 June, Al Ain agreed a contract extension with Waleed Salem, keeping him with the club for three more years. On 26 June, Alex Brosque leaves the club and return to Sydney FC, has signed a two-season deal and was presented on 1 July.

=== July ===
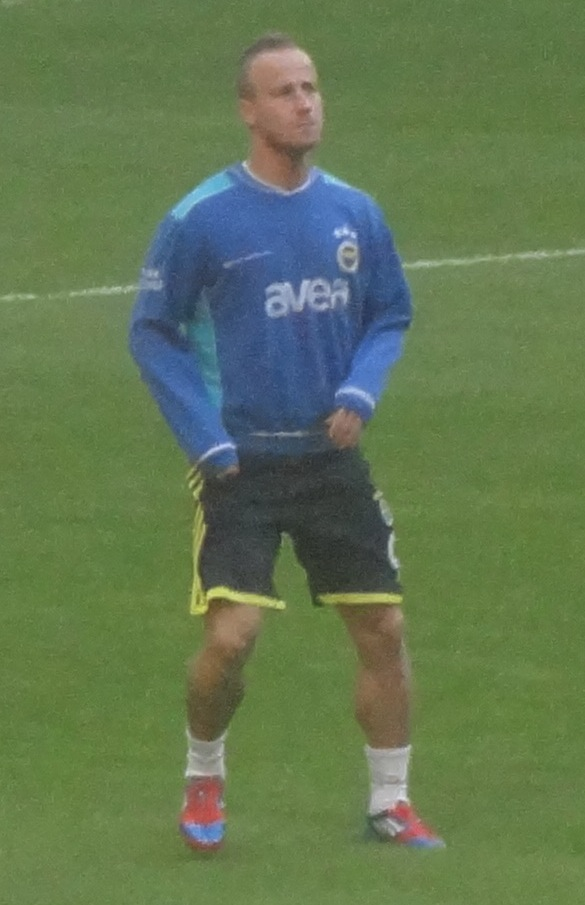
Miroslav Stoch joined on a one-season loan from Fenerbahçe.

On 3 July, Al Ain announce the signing of the Slovakian Miroslav Stoch from Fenerbahçe on one-year loan contract to become the third player joining the club. On 4 July, Team Supervisor, Mohammed Obeid Hammad, Stated that 20 players will leave the club, from the first team and most of them of the reserve team, after cancellation of the Reserve League and replaced by Under-21 Championship. Khaled and his younger brother Mohammed Abdulrahman signs a new extension 3 years with the club. Kembo Ekoko returned to the club after a one-year loan spell at the Qatari club El Jaish, also was called to join the club camp by Zlatko Dalić, to decide the 4th foreign player. On 9 July, Mohammed Salem became the third player loaned to Al Wasl FC, After Salem, Hazza. Sultan Nasser moved to promoted club Ittihad Kalba, for one season. Al Ain announce the signing of former Al Ahli Defender Mohammed Fawzi from Baniyas for three seasons along with the transfer of midfielder Bandar Al Ahbabi and Defender Abdulsalam Mohammed. He will wear the number 77 shirt. On the same day, Al Ain also announced that Kembo Ekoko will stay and will be the last foreign player. Later on the day, Mirel Rădoi moved to Al Ain rivals Al Ahli after end of his contract at the end of the 2013–14 season. Al Ain camp was supposed to be in Erzurum, Turkey. Due to bad weather they moved to Montecatini, Italy. On 11 July, Al Ain began its pre-season campaign against Italy 3rd Division side Montecatini FC. Al Ain won 2–0, goals coming from Faris Jumaa and Ibrahim Diaky, assisted by Bandar Al Ahbabi. On 14 July, Al Ain won in its second pre-season match against Folgore Falciano, with a 1–7, goals coming from a brace by Ryan Yslam and goals from Ibrahim Diaky, Mohamed Ahmed, Miroslav Stoch, Rashed Eisa and Khalid Khalfan. On 15 July, goalkeeper Yousif Abdelrahman moved to Fujairah for two seasons. On 17 July, Asamoah Gyan awarded Al Hadath Al Riyadi's golden boot for the third time in a row, After he scored 29 goals in 26 match in league. On 18 July, Al Ain beat Barnsley 2–1 in its third pre-season match, a brace by Kembo Ekoko. On 23 July, Al Ain played their fifth pre-season match in the Al Ain International Championship against Kuwait at the Sheikh Khalifa International Stadium in Al Ain. The match ended 4–0, coming from a brace by Kembo Ekoko and goals from Miroslav Stoch, Mohamed Abdulrahman. Kembo Ekoko named man of the match. On 24 July, Asamoah Gyan extending contract until 2018. Gyan joined Al Ain in 2011 from Sunderland on one season loan. On 6 July 2012 signed a five-year contract with club. He scored 103 goals in 92 match. Become Al Ain second top scorers in all competitions behind Ahmed Abdullah with 180. On 25 July, Al Ain won Al Ain International Championship in their sixth pre-season match after a draw with Al Nassr 1–1, with Al Ain only goal coming from Kembo Ekoko in the 72nd minute. Ahmed Barman named man of the match. Kembo Ekoko was top scorer of the Championship for scoring three goals. After the match Al Ain honored Asamoah Gyan as the top African goalscorer in the World Cup. He also ranked 35 on Goal 50 best footballers of the 2013–14 season, ahead of Paul Pogba and Robin van Persie. On 30 July, Al Ain announced renewed the contracts of four players Ahmed Barman, Mohamad Busanda, Saeed Mosabah, and Khalid Khalfan for long-term contracts.

=== August ===
On 5 August, Al Ain lose from Catania 0–3 in its sixth pre-season match. On 6 August, Faraj Juma moved on a 1-year loan deal to club Al Shaab. On 8 August, Al Ain win 2–1, in its seventh pre-season match against Al Wahda, a penalty goal from Asamoah Gyan and a second goal from Mohamed Abdulrahman. On 11 August, Al Ain win 1–0 in its last pre-season match against Moroccan club Raja Casablanca. The only goal coming from Asamoah Gyan in the 85th minute.

== Club ==
=== Current technical staff ===
Position	Name
First team head coach	(Croatia) Zlatko Dalić
Assistant coach	(Croatia) Dražen Ladić (United States) Hisham Sorour
Goalkeeping coach	(Iraq) Bashar Abduljalil
Fitness coach	(Croatia) Frano Lecco
Club doctor	(Greece) Nicholas Tzorudis
Physiotherapist	Ibstolius Derstas; Georgios Bosineaus
Team Manager	(United Arab Emirates) Matar Obaid Al Sahbani
Team Supervisor	(United Arab Emirates) Mohammed Obeid Hammad
Team Administrator	(United Arab Emirates) Nasser Al Junaibi
Director of football	(United Arab Emirates) Khalifa Suleiman

=== Other information ===
Chairman	(United Arab Emirates) Mohammed Bin Zayed Al Nahyan
Vice Chairman	(United Arab Emirates) Hazza Bin Zayed Al Nahyan
Chairman of Board of Directors	(United Arab Emirates) Abdullah Bin Mohammed Bin Khaled Al Nahyan
Vice Chairman of Board of Directors	(United Arab Emirates) Rashed Mubarak Al Hajeri
Board of Directors Member	(United Arab Emirates) Mohammed Salem Omair Al Shamisi
Board of Directors Member	(United Arab Emirates) Mohammed Abdullah Bin Bdoua Al Darmaki
Board of Directors Member	(United Arab Emirates) Mohamed Obaid Helal Al Dhaheri
Ground (capacity and dimensions)	Hazza Bin Zayed Stadium (25,000 / 45x50 metres)

Updated to match played 15 June 2014
Source: Al Ain FC, HBZStadium

== Players ==
=== First team squad ===
No.	Position(s)	Nationality	Name	Since	Date of birth (age)
Goalkeepers
12	GK	(United Arab Emirates)	Waleed Salem	2001	28 October 1980 (age 45)
17	GK	(United Arab Emirates)	Khalid Eisa	2013	15 September 1989 (age 36)
22	GK	(United Arab Emirates)	Mahmood Al Mas	2011	8 September 1983 (age 42)
36	GK	(United Arab Emirates)	Dawoud Sulaiman	2010	21 March 1990 (age 35)
Defenders
5	CB	(United Arab Emirates)	Ismail Ahmed	2008	7 July 1983 (age 42)
15	LB	(United Arab Emirates)	Khaled Abdulrahman	2009	10 September 1988 (age 37)
19	CB	(United Arab Emirates)	Mohanad Salem	2008	1 March 1985 (age 40)
21	RB	(United Arab Emirates)	Fawzi Fayez	2007	14 July 1987 (age 38)
23	RB / CB	(United Arab Emirates)	Mohamed Ahmed	2012	16 April 1989 (age 36)
44	CB / RB	(United Arab Emirates)	Faris Jumaa	2007	19 December 1988 (age 37)
50	LB	(United Arab Emirates)	Mohammed Fayez	2007	6 October 1989 (age 36)
77	DM / RB / CB	(United Arab Emirates)	Mohammed Fawzi	2014	22 February 1990 (age 35)
Midfielders
4	DM	(United Arab Emirates)	Sultan Al Ghaferi	2013	18 September 1986 (age 39)
7	RM / RW / AM	(United Arab Emirates)	Ali Al-Wehaibi (VC)	2001	27 October 1983 (age 42)
8	AM	(United Arab Emirates)	Rashed Eisa	2014	24 August 1990 (age 35)
9	RW / LW / SS	(France)	Kembo Ekoko	2012	8 January 1988 (age 38)
10	LW / RW / AM	(United Arab Emirates)	Omar Abdulrahman	2008	20 September 1991 (age 34)
18	CM / AM / DM	(United Arab Emirates)	Ibrahim Diaky	2013	24 May 1982 (age 43)
20	DM / CM	(United Arab Emirates)	Helal Saeed (C)	2011	24 March 1982 (age 43)
24	DM / CM	(United Arab Emirates)	Ahmed Barman	2013	5 February 1994 (age 31)
29	DM / CM	(South Korea)	Lee Myung-joo	2014	24 April 1990 (age 35)
30	AM / RM	(United Arab Emirates)	Mohammed Al Saadi	2011	28 October 1982 (age 43)
99	LW / RW / AM	(Slovakia)	Miroslav Stoch	2014	19 October 1989 (age 36)
Forwards
3	CF	(Ghana)	Asamoah Gyan	2011	22 November 1985 (age 40)
16	CF / RW / LW / AM / CM / DM	(United Arab Emirates)	Mohammed Abdulrahman	2012	4 February 1989 (age 36)

=== From the youth squad ===
Note: Flags indicate national team as defined under FIFA eligibility rules; some limited exceptions apply. Players may hold more than one non-FIFA nationality.

No.	Pos.	Nation	Player
13	FW	UAE	Khalefah Rashed
31	DF	UAE	Ahmad Salem
33	FW	UAE	Majed Ahmad
35	FW	UAE	Yousef Ahmed
37	DF	UAE	Rashed Muhayer

No.	Pos.	Nation	Player
38	DF	UAE	Saeed Mosabah
39	MF	UAE	Saqer Mohd
43	MF	UAE	Ryan Yslam
40	GK	UAE	Mohamad Busanda
49	DF	UAE	Salem Juma

== Transfers ==
=== In ===
No.	Pos.	Player	From	Fee	Date	Ref.
8	AM	(United Arab Emirates) Rashed Eisa	(United Arab Emirates) Al Wasl FC	Loan		AlAinFC.net
29	CM	(South Korea) Lee Myung-joo	(South Korea) Pohang Steelers	Transfer		AlAinFC.net
6	LW	(Slovakia) Miroslav Stoch	(Turkey) Fenerbahçe	Loan		AlAinFC.net
9	CF	(France) Kembo Ekoko	(Qatar) El Jaish	Loan return		AlAinFC.net
77	RB	(United Arab Emirates) Mohammed Fawzi	(United Arab Emirates) Baniyas	Transfer		24.ae
11	CF	(United Arab Emirates) Hamad Raqea	(United Arab Emirates) Al Dhafra	Loan return		EmaratAlYoum.com

=== Out ===
No.	Pos.	Player	To	Type	Source
–	LW	(Brazil) Michel Bastos	(Brazil) São Paulo	Transfer	AlAinFC.net
8	LW	(Belgium) Yassine El Ghanassy	(Belgium) Gent	End of Loan	AlAinFC.net
—	DM	(Ivory Coast) Bakary Saré	(Romania) CFR Cluj	End of Loan	AlAinFC.net
27	CM	(United Arab Emirates) Salem Abdullah	(United Arab Emirates) Al Wasl FC	Loan	AlAinFC.net
31	RB	(United Arab Emirates) Hazza Salem	(United Arab Emirates) Al Wasl FC	Loan	AlAinFC.net
32	CF	(Australia) Alex Brosque	(Australia) Sydney FC	End of contact	SydneyFC.com.au
33	LB	(United Arab Emirates) Mohammed Salem	(United Arab Emirates) Al Wasl FC	Loan	EmaratAlYoum.com
—	GK	(United Arab Emirates) Yousif Abdelrahman	(United Arab Emirates) Fujairah SC	Transfer	EmaratAlYoum.com
34	CM	(United Arab Emirates) Sultan Nasser	(United Arab Emirates) Ittihad Kalba	Transfer	AlRoeya.ae
14	RW	(United Arab Emirates) Bandar Al Ahbabi	(United Arab Emirates) Baniyas	Tra. (included in M.Fawzi transfer)	24.ae
26	CB	(United Arab Emirates) Abdulsalam Mohammed	(United Arab Emirates) Baniyas	Tra. (included in M.Fawzi transfer)	24.ae
6	DM	(Romania) Mirel Rădoi	(United Arab Emirates) Al Ahli	End of contact	AlAhliClub.ae
2	CB	(United Arab Emirates) Mohammed Ali Ayed	(United Arab Emirates) Al Shabab	Loan	EmaratAlYoum.com
37	CF	(United Arab Emirates) Faraj Juma	(United Arab Emirates) Al Shaab	Loan	AlShaabClub.ae
11	CF	(United Arab Emirates) Abdulaziz Fayez	(United Arab Emirates) Al Wasl FC	Loan	AlBayan.ae
25	AM	(United Arab Emirates) Ahmed Al Shamisi	(United Arab Emirates) Al Wasl FC	Loan	AlBayan.ae

== Pre-season and friendlies ==
Win Draw Loss

11 July 2014	Montecatini FC (Italy)	0 – 2	(United Arab Emirates) Al Ain	Montecatini, Italy
21:00 GMT+4 (UAE Time)		Report	38' Faris; 44' Diaky	Stadium: Stadio Di Montecatini; Referee: Sikshi

14 July 2014	Folgore Falciano (San Marino)	1 – 7	(United Arab Emirates) Al Ain	Montecatini, Italy
23:30 GMT+4 (UAE Time)	Matinee 70'	Report	26' Diaky; 36' M.Ahmed; 45' M.Stoch; 56', 75' Ryan.Y; 66' Rashed.E; 83' K.Khalfan	Stadium: Stadio Di Montecatini; Referee: Torbeka Silver

18 July 2014	Barnsley (England)	1 – 2	(United Arab Emirates) Al Ain	Verona, Italy
	75' Brad	Report	6', 27' Kembo	Stadium: Verona club Referee: Zambalini

23 July 2014 AIFC	Al Ain (United Arab Emirates)	4 – 0	Kuwait	Al Ain, United Arab Emirates
22:15 GMT+4 (UAE Time)	Kembo 29', 53'; M.Stoch 45'; Mohammed.A 58'; K.Khalfan (yellow card) 88'	Report	(yellow card) 22' N.Al Qahtani; (yellow card) 75' Makelele	Stadium: Sheikh Khalifa International; Referee: Hamad Al Shaikh; Man of the Match: Kembo Ekoko

25 July 2014 AIFC	Al Ain (United Arab Emirates)	1 – 1	(Saudi Arabia) Al Nassr	Al Ain, United Arab Emirates
22:15 GMT+4 (UAE Time)	Mohammed.F (yellow card) 9'; Kembo 72'; Ismail (yellow card) 30'; Mohanad (yellow card) 88'	Report	29' Al-Sahlawi; (red card) 37' Al-Sahlawi; (yellow card) 62' Al-Raheb; (yellow card) 81' Abdulghani; (yellow card) 88' Hawsawi	Stadium: Sheikh Khalifa International; Referee: Sultan Al Marzouqi; Man of the Match: Ahmed Barman

5 August 2014	Al Ain (United Arab Emirates)	0 – 3	(Italy) Catania	Logan, Austria
		Report	5', 35' Castro; 70' Rosina

8 August 2014	Al Ain (United Arab Emirates)	2 – 1	(United Arab Emirates) Al Wahda	Logan, Austria
	Gyan 44' (pen.); Mohammed.A 56'	Report	45' (pen.) Tagliabué

11 August 2014	Al Ain (United Arab Emirates)	1 – 0	(Morocco) Raja Casablanca	Logan, Austria
	Gyan 85'

14 August 2014	Al Ain (United Arab Emirates)	2 – 0	(Oman) Sohar SC	Al Ain, United Arab Emirates
	Lee 20'; Rashed.E 61'			Stadium: Hazza Bin Zayed Stadium

2 September 2014	Al Sharjah (United Arab Emirates)	1 – 2	(United Arab Emirates) Al Ain	Sharjah
17:45 GMT+4 (UAE Time)	Saif.R 18'	Report	77' Faris; 83' Mohammed.A	Stadium: Sharjah Stadium; Referee: Hassan Karim

=== Goalscorers and assists ===
Player	Goals	Assists
(France) Kembo Ekoko	5	1
(United Arab Emirates) Mohammed Abdulrahman	3	
(United Arab Emirates) Faris Jumaa	2	
(United Arab Emirates) Rashed Eisa	2	
(Ghana) Asamoah Gyan	2	
(Slovakia) Miroslav Stoch	2	1
(United Arab Emirates) Ibrahim Diaky	2	
(United Arab Emirates) Ryan Yslam	2	
(United Arab Emirates) Bandar Al Ahbabi		2
(United Arab Emirates) Ismail Ahmed		1
(United Arab Emirates) Ahmed Al Shamisi		1
(United Arab Emirates) Yousef Ahmed		1
(South Korea) Lee Myung-joo	1	1
(United Arab Emirates) Khalid Khalfan	1	
(United Arab Emirates) Mohamed Ahmed	1	

== Competitions ==
=== Overall record ===
Competition	First match	Last match	Starting round	Final position	Record							
Competition	First match	Last match	Starting round	Final position	Pld	W	D	L	GF	GA	GD	Win %
UAE Pro League	20 September 2014	9 May 2015	Matchday 1	Winners	26	18	6	2	62	19	+43	69.23
UAE President's Cup	14 May 2015	23 May 2015	Round of 16	Quarter-finals	2	1	0	1	5	1	+4	50.00
UAE League Cup	9 October 2014	9 January 2015	Group stage	Group stage	6	2	0	4	8	10	−2	33.33
UAE Super Cup	27 March 2015		Final	Runners–up	1	0	0	1	0	1	−1	0.00
AFC Champions League	24 February 2015	27 May 2015	Group stage	Round of 16	8	3	5	0	10	5	+5	37.50
Total					43	24	11	8	85	36	+49	55.81

Source: Soccerway

=== Pro League ===
==== League table ====
Pos	Team	Pld	W	D	L	GF	GA	GD	Pts	Qualification or relegation
1	Al-Ain (C)	26	18	6	2	62	19	+43	60	Qualification to the 2016 AFC Champions League Group Stage
2	Al-Jazira	26	16	3	7	66	46	+20	51	Qualification to the 2016 AFC Champions League Qualifying play-off
3	Al-Shabab	26	14	7	5	49	35	+14	49	Qualification to the 2016 AFC Champions League Second Qualifying Round
4	Al-Wahda	26	13	8	5	44	32	+12	47	
5	Al-Nasr	26	10	9	7	43	32	+11	39	Qualification to the 2016 AFC Champions League Group Stage (Note: Al-Nasr qualifies for 2016 AFC Champions League Group Stage as winners of 2014–15 UAE President's Cup.)

Updated to match(es) played on 3 June 2015. Source:
Rules for classification: 1) points; 2) goal difference; 3) number of goals scored.
(C) Champions

==== Results summary ====
Overall								Home						Away					
Pld	W	D	L	GF	GA	GD	Pts	W	D	L	GF	GA	GD	W	D	L	GF	GA	GD
6	4	1	1	15	7	+8	13	3	0	0	7	2	+5	1	1	1	8	5	+3

Last updated: 27 October 2014.
Source: Competitive matches

==== Results by round ====
Round	1	2	3	4	5	6	7	8	9	10	11	12	13	14	15	16	17	18	19	20	21	22	23	24	25	26
Ground	A	H	A	H	A	H	H	A	H	A	H	A	H	H	A	H	A	H	A	A	H	A	H	A	H	A
Result	P	W	W	P	L	W	W	D	D	W	W	W	W													
Position		5	3		7	5	3	4	6	5	5	2	1	1												

Updated to match(es) played on 19 December 2014. Source: Matches
A = Away; H = Home; W = Win; D = Draw; L = Loss; P = Postponed

==== Matches ====
20 September 2014 2	Al Ain	2–0	Al Wasl	Al Ain
20:15 GMT+4 (UAE Time)	Mohammed.A (yellow card) 26'; Omar. A (yellow card) 30'; Gyan 35'; M.Ahmed (yellow card) 40' (yellow-red card) 57'; M.Stoch 90+2'	Report	Berola (yellow card) 47'; M.Salem (yellow card) 66'; Hazza (yellow card) 80'	Stadium: Hazza Bin Zayed; Attendance: 3,783; Referee: Mohamed Abdulla

24 September 2014 3	Ajman	0–4	Al Ain	Ajman
18:55 GMT+4 (UAE Time)	Nasser.A (yellow card) 62'; Haddaf (yellow card) 45+1' (yellow-red card) 90+4'	Report	Mohammed.A 36'; M.Stoch 40'; Gyan 56'; M.Fawzi 90+1'	Stadium: Ajman Stadium; Attendance: 2,450; Referee: Hamad Ali

5 October 2014 5	Al Jazira	4–3	Al Ain	Abu Dhabi
20:00 GMT+4 (UAE Time)	Vucinic 8', 38', 60' (pen.), 70'; Khasif (yellow card) 84'; Bargash (yellow card) 90+5'	Report	Ismail (yellow card) 15'; Mohammed.A 25'; Kembo 31' (pen.), 64'; M. Ahmed (yellow card) 59'	Stadium: Mohammed Bin Zayed; Attendance: 11,680; Referee: Ammar Al-Jeneibi

17 October 2014 6	Al Ain	3–1	Al Dhafra	Al Ain
20:00 GMT+4 (UAE Time)	M.Stoch 37' (yellow card) 80'; Helal (yellow card) 45+1'; Kembo 52'; Mohanad 57'	Report	Saif.M 65'	Stadium: Hazza Bin Zayed; Attendance: 2,772; Referee: Abdulla Al Ajel

22 October 2014 7	Al Ain	2–1	Emirates	Al Ain
20:00 GMT+4 (UAE Time)	Ismail (yellow card) 39'; Diaky 59', 81'	Report	J.Maroof (yellow card) 2'; Rodrigo 38'; Mubarek (yellow card) 81'	Stadium: Hazza Bin Zayed; Attendance: 2,155; Referee: Adel Al Naqbi

27 October 2014 8	Al Ahli	1–1	Al Ain	Dubai
20:00 GMT+4 (UAE Time)	Luis (yellow card) 21'; Carlitos 35' (yellow card) 75' (yellow-red card) 90+1'; Walid.A (yellow card) 39' Majed.H (yellow card) 43'; M.Naser (yellow card) 90+1'	Report	Mohanad 5'; Diaky (yellow card) 45+1'; Mohammed.A (yellow card) 90+3'; S. Al Ghaferi (yellow card) 90+5'	Stadium: Rashid Stadium; Attendance: 9,500; Referee: Yaqoub Al Hammadi

30 November 2014 9	Al Ain	1–1	Al Nasr	Al Ain
16:45 GMT+4 (UAE Time)	Gyan 77' (pen.)	Report	T. Ahmed 5'	Stadium: Hazza Bin Zayed; Referee: Mohamed Abdulla

5 December 2014 10	Ittihad Kalba	1–4	Al Ain	Kalba
19:30 GMT+4 (UAE Time)	Leal 18'	Report	Mohammed.A 19'; Diaky 56'; Gyan 61', 62'	Stadium: Ittihad Kalba Stadium; Referee: Sultan Mohamed Saleh

10 December 2014 11	Al Ain	4–0	Al Wahda	Al Ain
19:30 GMT+4 (UAE Time)	Diaky 13'; F. Jumaa 20'; Stoch 39', 69'	Report		Stadium: Hazza Bin Zayed; Referee: Mohamed Abdulla

14 December 2014 12	Baniyas	0–3	Al Ain	Abu Dhabi
16:50 GMT+4 (UAE Time)		Report	Gyan 38', 55'; Stoch 41'	Stadium: Baniyas Stadium; Referee: Sultan Abdulrazaq

18 December 2014 13	Al Ain	4–1	Sharjah	Al Ain
19:30 GMT+4 (UAE Time)	Gyan 50'; Stoch 66'; Myung-joo 86'; Ekoko 90+2'	Report	Wanderley 57'	Stadium: Hazza Bin Zayed; Referee: Mohamed Abdulla

22 December 2014 1	Al Shabab	1–1	Al Ain	Dubai
18:20 GMT+4 (UAE Time)	Edgar 68'	Report	M. Ahmed 85'	Stadium: Maktoum Bin Rashid; Referee: Ammar Al-Jeneibi

4 February 2015 14	Al Ain	2–1	Al Shabab	Al Ain
20:00 GMT+4 (UAE Time)	Myung-joo 16'; Ekoko 76' (pen.)	Report	N. Masoud 45'	Stadium: Hazza Bin Zayed; Referee: Yaqoub Al Hammadi

9 February 2015 15	Al Wasl	0–1	Al Ain	Dubai
20:15 GMT+4 (UAE Time)		Report	Mohammed.A 18'	Stadium: Zabeel Stadium; Referee: Mohamed Abdulla

13 February 2015 16	Al Ain	7–1	Ajman	Al Ain
17:30 GMT+4 (UAE Time)	Al-Kathiri 5', 16'; Ekoko 27', 86'; Diaky 44'; R. Eisa 69'; Stoch 88'	Report	Kabi 65'	Stadium: Hazza Bin Zayed; Referee: Sultan Abdulrazaq

19 February 2015 17	Fujairah	1–0	Al Ain	Fujairah
17:25 GMT+4 (UAE Time)	Sanogo 65'	Report		Stadium: Fujairah Club Stadium; Referee: Abdulla Al Ajel

28 February 2015 4	Al Ain	3–0	Fujairah	Al Ain
17:35 GMT+4 (UAE Time)	Gyan 45+1' (pen.), 86'; A. Ismael 71' (o.g.)	Report		Stadium: Hazza Bin Zayed; Referee: Yaqoub Al Hammadi

8 March 2015 18	Al Ain	2–1	Al Jazira	Al Ain
20:30 GMT+4 (UAE Time)	O. Abdulrahman 17'; Gyan 32'	Report	Lanzini 45+1'	Stadium: Hazza Bin Zayed; Referee: Mohamed Abdulla

13 March 2015 19	Al Dhafra	1–1	Al Ain	Abu Dhabi
17:50 GMT+4 (UAE Time)	Diop 10'	Report	Ekoko 59'	Stadium: Hamdan Bin Zayed; Referee: Abdulla Al Ajel

22 March 2015 20	Emirates	1–5	Al Ain	Ras al-Khaimah
17:40 GMT+4 (UAE Time)	M. Malallah 1'	Report	R. Eisa 5', 69'; I. Ahmed 21'; Diaky 46'; M. Ahmed 90+3'	Stadium: Emirates Club Stadium; Referee: Ammar Al-Jeneibi

2 April 2015 21	Al Ain	1–0	Al Ahli	Al Ain
20:30 GMT+4 (UAE Time)	Gyan 45+1'	Report		Stadium: Hazza Bin Zayed; Referee: Ammar Al-Jeneibi

11 April 2015 22	Al Nasr	1–2	Al Ain	Dubai
20:45 GMT+4 (UAE Time)	Holman 20'	Report	O. Abdulrahman 39'; Ekoko 42'	Stadium: Al-Maktoum Stadium; Referee: Mohamed Abdulla

16 April 2015 23	Al Ain	4–0	Ittihad Kalba	Al Ain
17:55 GMT+4 (UAE Time)	Stoch 30'; Ekoko 32'; O. Abdulrahman 42'; Gyan 83'	Report		Stadium: Hazza Bin Zayed; Referee: Adel Al Naqbi

27 April 2015 24	Al Wahda	0–0	Al Ain	Abu Dhabi
20:45 GMT+4 (UAE Time)		Report		Stadium: Al-Nahyan Stadium; Referee: Fahad Al-Kassar

1 May 2015 25	Al Ain	1–0	Baniyas	Al Ain
18:05 GMT+4 (UAE Time)	Ekoko 52'	Report		Stadium: Hazza Bin Zayed; Referee: Adel Al Naqbi

9 May 2015 26	Sharjah	1–1	Al Ain	Sharjah
18:05 GMT+4 (UAE Time)	Wanderley 57'	Report	Mohammed.A 60'	Stadium: Sharjah Stadium; Referee: Sultan Mohamed Saleh

=== President's Cup ===
14 May 2015 Round of 16	Al Ain	5–0	Dibba	Al Ain
19:10	Gyan 15', 38', 49', 53'; Stoch 57'	Report; Details		Stadium: Hazza Bin Zayed; Referee: Adel Al Naqbi

23 May 2015 Quarter-finals	Al Nasr	1–0	Al Ain	Dubai
19:45	Touré 89'	Report; Details		Stadium: Al-Maktoum Stadium; Referee: Mohamed Abdulla

=== Super Cup ===
27 March 2015	Al Ahli	1–0	Al Ain	Abu Dhabi
19:20 GMT+4 (UAE Time)	S. Khamis 86'	Report	Mohammed.A (red card) 90+1'	Stadium: Mohammed bin Zayed; Referee: Yaqoub Al Hammadi

=== League Cup ===
==== Group A ====
Pos	Team	Pld	W	D	L	GF	GA	GD	Pts
1	Al Nasr	6	4	2	0	8	3	+5	14
2	Al Shabab	6	4	0	2	12	7	+5	12
3	Al Wasl	6	3	2	1	9	5	+4	11
4	Kalba	6	2	1	3	4	10	−6	7
5	Al Ain	6	2	0	4	8	10	−2	6
6	Al Jazira	6	2	0	4	6	8	−2	6
7	Ajman	6	1	1	4	7	11	−4	4

Source: Soccerway.com

9 October 2014 1	Al Ain	0–1	Kalba	Al Ain
17:10 GMT+4 (UAE Time)	Al Ghaferi (yellow card) 61' Kembo (yellow card) 88' Barman (yellow card) 90+2'	Report; Details	Y.Hassan (yellow card) 22'; Wael.A (yellow card) 24'; Danilo.P 66' (pen.); Hassan (yellow card) 77'	Stadium: Hazza Bin Zayed; Attendance: 1,386; Referee: Ali Hassan Karim

6 November 2014 2	Al Jazira	3–1	Al Ain	Abu Dhabi
19:30	A. Rabia 54'; Pitroipa 78'; K. Mubarak 83'; Alsenaani (yellow card) 90+2'	Report	Al-Azizi (yellow card) 28'; Stoch (yellow card) 34' (goal) 68' (pen.); F. Jumaa (yellow card) 24'; Al-Menhali (yellow card) 24'	Stadium: Mohammad Bin Zayed; Attendance: 320; Referee: Ahmad Salem Khalfan

12 November 2014 3	Al Ain	1–2	Al Nasr	Al Ain
16:45	Myung-joo 5'	Report	Touré 74', 82'	Stadium: Hazza Bin Zayed; Referee: Yahya Al Mulla

30 December 2014 4	Al Shabab	2–3	Al Ain	Dubai
19:30	Villanueva 48'; Edgar 85'	Report	M.Stoch 34', 60'; Kembo 90+1' (pen.)	Stadium: Maktoum Bin Rashid; Referee: Sultan Mohamed Saleh

4 January 2015 5	Al Ain	3–1	Ajman	Al Ain
16:55	M. Hassan 12' (o.g.); Diaky 81', 90+4'	Report	Fettouhi 28' (pen.)	Stadium: Hazza Bin Zayed; Referee: Ali Hassan Karim

9 January 2015 6	Al Wasl	1–0	Al Ain	Dubai
18:30	Canedo 78'	Report		Stadium: Zabeel Stadium; Referee: Yaseen Al Mansory

=== AFC Champions League ===
==== Group B ====
Pos	Team	Pld	W	D	L	GF	GA	GD	Pts	Qualification	AIN	NAF	PAK	SHB
1	(United Arab Emirates) Al-Ain	6	3	3	0	7	2	+5	12	Advance to knockout stage	—	3–0	1–1	0–0
2	(Iran) Naft Tehran	6	2	2	2	8	8	0	8	Advance to knockout stage	1–1	—	1–1	2–1
3	(Uzbekistan) Pakhtakor	6	1	3	2	6	8	−2	6		0–1	2–1	—	0–2
4	(Saudi Arabia) Al-Shabab	6	1	2	3	5	8	−3	5		0–1	0–3	2–2	—

Source: AFC
Rules for classification: Group stage tiebreakers

24 February 2015	Al Ain (United Arab Emirates)	0–0	(Saudi Arabia) Al-Shabab	Hazza Bin Zayed Stadium, Al Ain
19:00 UTC+4		Report		Attendance: 15,426; Referee: Mohd Amirul Izwan Bin Yaacob (Malaysia)

3 March 2015	Naft Tehran (Iran)	1–1	(United Arab Emirates) Al Ain	Azadi Stadium, Tehran
18:00 UTC+3:30	Kouroshi 50'	Report	Gyan 58' (pen.)	Attendance: 3,300; Referee: Tan Hai (China)

18 March 2015	Pakhtakor (Uzbekistan)	0–1	(United Arab Emirates) Al Ain	Pakhtakor Markaziy Stadium, Tashkent
17:00 UTC+5		Report	Stoch 61'	Attendance: 8,675; Referee: Kim Jong-hyeok (South Korea)

7 April 2015	Al Ain (United Arab Emirates)	1–1	(Uzbekistan) Pakhtakor	Hazza Bin Zayed Stadium, Al Ain
19:15 UTC+4	Kembo 20'	Report	Sergeev 45+2'	Attendance: 6,872; Referee: Fahad Al-Marri (Qatar)

22 April 2015	Al-Shabab (Saudi Arabia)	0–1	(United Arab Emirates) Al Ain	Prince Faisal bin Fahd Stadium, Riyadh
20:40 UTC+3		Report	Gyan 58'	Attendance: 1,977; Referee: Minoru Tōjō (Japan)

6 May 2015	Al Ain (United Arab Emirates)	3–0	(Iran) Naft Tehran	Hazza Bin Zayed Stadium, Al Ain
19:30 UTC+4	O. Abdulrahman 63'; Gyan 74'; Kembo 87'	Report		Attendance: 4,299; Referee: Peter Green (Australia)

==== Knockout phase ====
===== Round of 16 =====
20 May 2015 First leg	Al Ahli (United Arab Emirates)	0–0	(United Arab Emirates) Al Ain	Rashid Stadium, Dubai
19:45 UTC+4		Report		Attendance: 8,900; Referee: Ko Hyung-jin (South Korea)

27 May 2015 Second leg	Al Ain (United Arab Emirates)	3–3	(United Arab Emirates) Al Ahli	Hazza Bin Zayed Stadium, Al Ain
19:50 UTC+4	Gyan 5', 78'; R. Eisa 90+2'	Report	S. Khamis 51'; A. Khalil 53', 56'	Attendance: 14,270; Referee: Mohanad Qasim Eesee Sarray (Iraq)

3–3 on aggregate. Al-Ahli won on away goals.

== Statistics ==
=== Squad, appearances and goals ===
No.	Nat	Player	Total				League		Asia		Cup		League Cup		Super Cup	
No.	Nat	Player	Starts	Apps	Goals	Min	Apps	Goals	Apps	Goals	Apps	Goals	Apps	Goals	Apps	Goals
Goalkeepers
12	(United Arab Emirates)	Waleed.S	1	1	—	95	0	—	0	—	0	—	1	—	0	—
17	(United Arab Emirates)	Khalid.E	9	9	—	824	6	—	3	—	0	—	0	—	0	—
36	(United Arab Emirates)	Dawoud	0	1	—	29	0	—	1	—	0	—	0	—	0	—
40	(United Arab Emirates)	Bu Senda	1	1	—	94	0	—	0	—	0	—	1	—	0	—
Defenders
5	(United Arab Emirates)	Ismail	9	9	1	856	6	0	3	1	0	0	0	0	0	0
15	(United Arab Emirates)	Khaled.A	0	0	0	0	0	0	0	0	0	0	0	0	0	0
19	(United Arab Emirates)	Mohanad	5	6	2	486	6	2	0	0	0	0	0	0	0	0
21	(United Arab Emirates)	Fawzi	5	6	0	476	4	0	0	0	0	0	2	0	0	0
23	(United Arab Emirates)	M. Ahmed	7	7	0	575	4	0	3	0	0	0	0	0	0	0
38	(United Arab Emirates)	Saeed.M	2	2	0	166	0	0	0	0	0	0	2	0	0	0
44	(United Arab Emirates)	Fares.J	5	5	0	471	0	0	3	0	0	0	2	0	0	0
49	(United Arab Emirates)	Salem.J	2	2	0	155	0	0	0	0	0	0	2	0	0	0
50	(United Arab Emirates)	Mohammed.F	10	10	0	934	6	0	3	0	0	0	1	0	0	0
77	(United Arab Emirates)	M.Fawzi	0	4	1	97	3	1	1	0	0	0	0	0	0	0
Midfielders
4	(United Arab Emirates)	S. Al Ghaferi	2	6	0	225	3	0	1	0	0	0	2	0	0	0
7	(United Arab Emirates)	Al Wehaibi (VC)	0	0	0	0	0	0	0	0	0	0	0	0	0	0
8	(United Arab Emirates)	Rashed	1	3	0	92	3	0	0	0	0	0	0	0	0	0
9	(France)	Kembo	8	8	3	612	4	3	3	0	0	0	1	0	0	0
10	(United Arab Emirates)	Omar.A	5	5	1	433	2	0	3	1	0	0	0	0	0	0
18	(United Arab Emirates)	Diaky	6	9	3	626	5	2	2	1	0	0	2	0	0	0
20	(United Arab Emirates)	Helal.S (C)	4	5	0	384	4	0	1	0	0	0	0	0	0	0
24	(United Arab Emirates)	A.Barman	6	10	0	597	6	0	2	0	0	0	2	0	0	0
29	(South Korea)	Lee.M.J	9	9	0	831	5	0	3	0	0	0	1	0	0	0
30	(United Arab Emirates)	Mohammed.S	0	2	0	96	0	0	0	0	0	0	2	0	0	0
43	(United Arab Emirates)	Rayan.Y	1	2	0	95	0	0	0	0	0	0	2	0	0	0
99	(Slovakia)	Stoch	10	10	4	882	6	3	3	0	0	0	1	1	0	0
Forwards
3	(Ghana)	Asamoah	5	6	4	475	3	2	3	2	0	0	0	0	0	0
11	(United Arab Emirates)	H.Raqea	0	0	0	0	0	0	0	0	0	0	0	0	0	0
13	(United Arab Emirates)	Khalefah.R	0	1	0	29	0	0	0	0	0	0	1	0	0	0
16	(United Arab Emirates)	Mohammed.A	5	8	2	487	5	2	3	0	0	0	0	0	0	0
33	(United Arab Emirates)	Majed.A	0	1	0	23	0	0	0	0	0	0	1	0	0	0
35	(United Arab Emirates)	Yousef.A	1	4	0	173	2	0	0	0	0	0	2	0	0	0
Appearances = Total appearances
Last updated: 6 November 2014

=== Goalscorers ===
As of 27 May 2015

Includes all competitive matches. The list is sorted alphabetically by surname when total goals are equal.

Rank	No.	Pos.	Player	League	President's Cup	League Cup	Super Cup	Champions League	Total
1	3	FW	(Ghana) Asamoah Gyan	13	4			5	22
2	99	MF	(Slovakia) Miroslav Stoch	9	1	3		1	14
2	9	MF	(France) Kembo Ekoko	11		1		2	14
4	18	MF	(United Arab Emirates) Ibrahim Diaky	6		2			8
5	16	FW	(United Arab Emirates) Mohammed Abdulrahman	5					5
6	10	MF	(United Arab Emirates) Omar Abdulrahman	3				1	4
6	8	MF	(United Arab Emirates) Rashed Eisa	3				1	4
8	29	MF	(South Korea) Lee Myung-joo	2		1			3
9	19	DF	(United Arab Emirates) Mohanad Salem	2					2
9	23	DF	(United Arab Emirates) Mohamed Ahmed	2					2
9	11	FW	(United Arab Emirates) Saeed Al-Kathiri	2					2
12	77	DF	(United Arab Emirates) Mohammed Fawzi	1					1
12	5	DF	(United Arab Emirates) Ismail Ahmed	1					1
12	44	DF	(United Arab Emirates) Fares Jumaa	1					1
Own Goals				1		1			2
TOTALS				62	5	8		10	85

=== Assists ===
R	Pos.	Player	League	President's Cup	League Cup	Super Cup	Champions League	Total
1	MF	(Slovakia) Miroslav Stoch	8	1	1			10
—	MF	(France) Kembo Ekoko	7		1			8
—	FW	(United Arab Emirates) Mohammed Abdulrahman	4				1	5
—	MF	(South Korea) Lee Myung-joo	4				1	5
4	MF	(United Arab Emirates) Ibrahim Diaky	3					3
—	MF	(United Arab Emirates) Rashed Eisa	2				1	3
—	DF	(United Arab Emirates) Mohamed Ahmed	1	1			1	3
4	MF	(United Arab Emirates) Omar Abdulrahman	1	1			1	3
—	FW	(Ghana) Asamoah Gyan	2					2
6	DF	(United Arab Emirates) Mohammed Fayez	1				1	2
—	MF	(United Arab Emirates) Helal Saeed	1	1				2
6	DF	(United Arab Emirates) Fawzi Fayez	1					1
—	DF	(United Arab Emirates) Mohammed Fawzi	1					1

=== Disciplinary record ===
N	P	Nat.	Name	League			League Cup			President's Cup			Champions League			Super Cup			Total			Notes
N	P	Nat.	Name	Yellow card	Second yellow card	Red card	Yellow card	Second yellow card	Red card	Yellow card	Second yellow card	Red card	Yellow card	Second yellow card	Red card	Yellow card	Second yellow card	Red card	Yellow card	Second yellow card	Red card	Notes
3	FW	(Ghana)	Gyan												1						1	
4	MF	(United Arab Emirates)	S. Al Ghaferi	1			1												2			
5	DF	(United Arab Emirates)	Ismail	2															2			
9	MF	(United Arab Emirates)	Kembo				1												1			
10	MF	(United Arab Emirates)	Omar.A	1									1						2			
16	MF	(United Arab Emirates)	Mohammed.A	2															2			
17	GK	(United Arab Emirates)	Khalid.E												1						1	
18	MF	(United Arab Emirates)	Diaky	1															1			
20	MF	(United Arab Emirates)	Helal	1															1			
23	DF	(United Arab Emirates)	M. Ahmed	1	1								1						2	1		
24	MF	(United Arab Emirates)	Barman				1						1						2			
38	DF	(United Arab Emirates)	Saeed.M				1												1			
44	DF	(United Arab Emirates)	Fares.J				1												1			
49	DF	(United Arab Emirates)	Salem.J				1												1			
99	MF	(Slovakia)	M.Stoch	1			1						1						3			

Last updated: 6 November 2014
Source: Competitive matches and AGLeague.ae
Only competitive matches
Ordered by (red card) , (second yellow card) and (yellow card)
(yellow card) = Number of bookings; (second yellow card) = Number of sending offs after a second yellow card; (red card) = Number of sending offs by a direct red card.

=== Hat-tricks ===
Player	Against	Result	Date	Competition	Round
(Ghana) Asamoah Gyan^{4}	Dibba	5–0	14 May 2015	President's Cup	Round of 16

^{4} – Player scored four goals.
