= 2018 UAE Super Cup =

Al Ain	Al Wahda
3	3
- Al Wahda won 4–3 on penalties
- Date: 25 August 2018
- Venue: 30 June Stadium, Cairo
- Referee: Abdulla Ali Al Zaabi

The 2018 UAE Super Cup was the 11th professional and 18th overall edition of the UAE Super Cup, held at the 30 June Stadium, Cairo on 25 August 2018, between Al Ain, winners of both the 2017–18 UAE Pro-League and 2017–18 UAE President's Cup, and Al Wahda, winners of the 2017–18 UAE League Cup. Al Wahda won the game 4–3 on penalties.

== Details ==
25 August 2018
23:00 GMT+4

Al Ain	3–3	Al Wahda
Berg 62'; Diaky 73' (pen.); Caio 77'	Report	Matar 4'; Batna 7'; Tagliabúe 40'
Penalties
Diaky (penalty scored); Berg (penalty scored); El Shahat (penalty missed); Caio (penalty missed); Al-Ahbabi (penalty scored)	3–4	(penalty scored) Batna; (penalty missed) Tagliabúe; (penalty scored) Rim Chang-woo; (penalty scored) Al-Kamali; (penalty scored) Leonardo

30 June Stadium, Cairo
Referee: Abdulla Ali Al Zaabi

Al Ain	Al Wahda

GK	17	(United Arab Emirates) Khalid Eisa
RB	11	(United Arab Emirates) Bandar Al-Ahbabi	(yellow card) 89'
CB	19	(United Arab Emirates) Mohanad Salem (c)
CB	23	(United Arab Emirates) Mohamed Ahmed
LB	33	(Japan) Tsukasa Shiotani		(substituted off) 65'
DM	6	(United Arab Emirates) Amer Abdulrahman
DM	7	(Brazil) Caio
RW	13	(United Arab Emirates) Ahmed Barman		(substituted off) 46'
AM	16	(United Arab Emirates) Mohamed Abdulrahman
LW	74	(Egypt) Hussein El Shahat
ST	9	(Sweden) Marcus Berg
Substitutes:
GK	12	(United Arab Emirates) Hamad Al-Mansoori
DF	14	(United Arab Emirates) Mohammed Fayez
DF	15	(United Arab Emirates) Khaled Abdulrahman	(yellow card) 77'
MF	18	(United Arab Emirates) Ibrahim Diaky		(substituted on) 46'
MF	43	(United Arab Emirates) Rayan Yaslam		(substituted on) 65'
MF	44	(United Arab Emirates) Saeed Juma
MF	88	(United Arab Emirates) Yahia Nader Moustafa
MF	99	(United Arab Emirates) Jamal Maroof
FW	20	(United Arab Emirates) Saad Khamis
Manager:
(Croatia) Zoran Mamić

GK	50	(United Arab Emirates) Rashed Ali
RB	2	(United Arab Emirates) Mohamed Barghash
CB	8	(United Arab Emirates) Hamdan Al-Kamali	(yellow card) 72'
CB	23	(South Korea) Rim Chang-woo
LB	52	(United Arab Emirates) Hussain Abbas
DM	5	(United Arab Emirates) Mohammad Abdulla
CM	6	(United Arab Emirates) Sultan Al Ghaferi		(substituted off) 77'
SS	9	(United Arab Emirates) Mourad Batna
RW	10	(United Arab Emirates) Ismail Matar (c)		(substituted off) 71'
LW	11	(Argentina) Sebastián Tagliabúe
CF	30	(United Arab Emirates) Tareq Ahmed		(substituted off) 60'
Substitutes:
GK	88	(United Arab Emirates) Saeed Al-Mesmari
DF	18	(Egypt) Abdulla El Refaey
DF	45	(United Arab Emirates) Abdulla Al Hammadi
MF	15	(United Arab Emirates) Nasir Abdelhadi		(substituted on) 77'
MF	32	(United Arab Emirates) Mohamed Helal
MF	36	(United Arab Emirates) Ahmed Al Akberi
FW	42	(Brazil) Leonardo		(substituted on) 71'
MF	20	(United Arab Emirates) Yahya Al Ghassani
FW	70	(United Arab Emirates) Mohamed Rashid		(substituted on) 60'
Manager:
(Romania) Laurențiu Reghecampf

Assistant referees:
Ahmed Saeed Al Rashedi
Hasan Ahmed Al Hammadi
Fourth official:
Ahmed Salem Al Aleeli

== See also ==
- 2017–18 UAE Pro-League
- 2017–18 UAE President's Cup
- 2017–18 UAE League Cup
