= 2013 UAE Super Cup =

Al Ain	Al Ahli
0	0
- Al Ahli won 3–2 on penalties
- Date: 30 August 2013
- Venue: Mohammed Bin Zayed, Abu Dhabi
- Referee: Abdullah Al Ajel
- Attendance: 29,874

The 2013 UAE Super Cup was the 12th and the 6th Professional UAE Super Cup, held at the Mohammed Bin Zayed Stadium, Abu Dhabi on 30 August 2013 between Al Ain, winners of the 2012–13 UAE Pro-League and 2012–13 UAE President's Cup winners Al Ahli. Al Ahli won the game 3–2 on penalties.

== Details ==
30 August 2013
19:25 GMT+4

Al Ain	0–0	Al Ahli
Rădoi (yellow card) 6'; Mohamed. A (yellow card) 23'; Al Shamisi (yellow card) 80'; Fares (yellow card) 85'	Report	(yellow card) 9' A. Khalil; (red card) 90' M. Hassan; (yellow card) 90+3' Majed. N
Penalties
Gyan (penalty scored); Omar. A (penalty missed); Al Shamisi (penalty missed); Fares (penalty scored); Diaky (penalty missed)	2–3	(penalty missed) Jiménez; (penalty scored) Ciel; (penalty scored) Viana; (penalty scored) Sanqour

Mohammed Bin Zayed Stadium, Abu Dhabi
Attendance: 29,874
Referee: Abdullah Al Ajel

Assistant referees:
Masoud Hasan
Mohamed Ahmed
Fourth official:
Sultan Abdulrazzaq
Match Commissioner:
Ali Khalfan

== See also ==
- 2013–14 UAE Pro-League
- 2012–13 UAE President's Cup
- 2013–14 Al Ain FC season
