= Abdulaziz Haikal =

Emirati footballer (born 1990)

Personal information
- Full name: Abdelaziz Husain Haikal Mubarak Al-Balooshi
- Date of birth: 10 September 1990 (age 36)
- Place of birth: Abu Dhabi, United Arab Emirates
- Height: 1.78 m (5 ft 10 in)
- Position: Right back

Team information
- Current team: Al Bataeh
- Number: 26

Youth career
- 2002–2009: Al Shabab

Senior career*
Years	Team	Apps	(Gls)
2008–2010	Al Shabab	18	(1)
2010–2024	Shabab Al Ahli	245	(3)
2024	→ Al Bataeh (loan)	13	(0)
2024–	Al Bataeh	0	(0)

International career
2008–2010	United Arab Emirates U20	7	(0)
2011–2012	United Arab Emirates U23	2	(0)
2011–	United Arab Emirates	44	(0)
- * Club domestic league appearances and goals

Abdulaziz Husain Haikal Mubarak Al-Balooshi (born 10 September 1990) is an Emirati professional association football player who plays for Al Bataeh. He competed at the 2012 Summer Olympics.

== Honours ==
Shabab Al Ahli

- UAE Pro League: 2022–23
- UAE President's Cup: 2018–19, 2020–21
- UAE League Cup: 2018–19, 2020–21
- UAE Super Cup: 2020, 2023

Al Ahli

- UAE Pro League: 2013–14, 2015–16
- UAE President's Cup: 2012–13
- UAE League Cup: 20011–12, 2013–14, 2016–17
- UAE Super Cup: 2013, 2014, 2016

UAE

- AFC Asian Cup third-place: 2015
- AFC U-19 Championship: 2008
