= Mansor Sharahili =

Saudi Arabian footballer

Personal information
- Full name: Mansor Yahya Sharahili
- Date of birth: March 26, 1991 (age 35)
- Place of birth: Jeddah, Saudi Arabia
- Height: 1.78 m (5 ft 10 in)
- Position: Right-back

Youth career
- Ittihad FC

Senior career*
Years	Team	Apps	(Gls)
2012–2015	Ittihad FC	8	(0)
2014–2015	→ Al-Wahda (loan)	19	(0)
2015–2016	Al-Wahda	3	(0)
2016–2017	Damac		
2018–2020	Al-Kholood		
2020–2022	Wej		
2022–2023	Al-Entesar		
- * Club domestic league appearances and goals

Mansor Sharahili (Arabic: منصور شراحيلي; born 26 March 1991) is a Saudi football player. He currently plays as a right back.
