= Ahmed Barman =

Emirati footballer (born 1994)

Personal information
- Full name: Ahmed Barman Ali Barman Shamroukh Hammoudi
- Date of birth: 5 February 1994 (age 32)
- Place of birth: Dibba Al-Hisn, United Arab Emirates
- Height: 1.76 m (5 ft 9 in)
- Position: Midfielder

Team information
- Current team: Khor Fakkan
- Number: 13

Youth career
- 2005–2009: Dibba
- 2009–2013: Al Ain

Senior career*
Years	Team	Apps	(Gls)
2013–2025	Al Ain	182	(5)
2025–	Khor Fakkan	0	(0)

International career^{‡}
2016–2022	United Arab Emirates	28	(1)
- * Club domestic league appearances and goals as of 30 December 2021 ‡ National team caps and goals as of 28 September 2023

Ahmed Barman Al-Hammoudi (Arabic: أَحْمَدُ بَرْمَانُ عَلِيُّ بَرْمَانُ شَمْرُوخُ الْحَمُّودِيُّ; born 5 February 1994) is an Emirati footballer who plays as a midfielder for Khor Fakkan.

== International goals ==
Scores and results list the United Arab Emirates' goal tally first.

No.	Date	Venue	Opponent	Score	Result	Competition
1.	31 August 2019	Bahrain National Stadium, Riffa, Bahrain	Sri Lanka	4–1	5–1	Friendly

== Honours ==
=== Al Ain ===
Competition	Achievement	Year
UAE Arabian Gulf League	Winner	2011–12, 2012–13
UAE President's Cup	Winner	2013–14
Arabian Gulf Super Cup	Winner	2013
AFC Champions League	Winner	2023-24
Arabian Gulf Super Cup	Runners-up	2014
FIFA Club World Cup	Runner-up	2018
