= 2014–15 UAE President's Cup =

2014-15 UAE President's Cup
Tournament details
- Country: United Arab Emirates
- Teams: 16

Final positions
- Champions: Al-Nasr
- Runners-up: Al-Ahli

Tournament statistics
- Matches played: 15
- Goals scored: 49 (3.27 per match)

The 2014–15 UAE President's Cup is the 39th season of the UAE President's Cup, the premier knockout tournament for association football clubs in the United Arab Emirates. winners will qualify for the group stage of the 2016 AFC Champions League.

== Round of 16 ==
Al Wahda 2-2 (P) Dubai

Dibba Al Fujairah 0-5 Al Ain

Al Ahli 2-1 Al Ittihad Kalba

Al Jazira 2-3 Ajman

Al Fujairah 1-1 (P) Al Dhafra

Bani Yas 3-1 Al Wasl

Emirates 2-5 Al Shabab

Al Sharjah 0-1 (E) Al Nasr

== Quarter-finals ==
Al Nasr 1-0 Al Ain

Dubai 3-5 (E) Al Ahli

Al Shabab (P) 1-1 Bani Yas

Al Dhafra 2-0 Ajman

== Semi-finals ==
Al Nasr (P) 1-1 Al Shabab

Al Dhafra 0-2 Al Ahli

== Final ==
3 June 2015

Al Nasr (1-1) Al Ahli

       (3–0) Penalties

Al Nasr won UAE President's Cup
