= Rashid Malallah =

Emirati association football player (born 1987)

Rashid Malallah راشد مال الله
Personal information
- Full name: Rashid Malallah Juma Al-Kendi
- Date of birth: 9 December 1987 (age 38)
- Place of birth: Emirates
- Height: 1.77 m (5 ft 10 in)
- Position: Defender

Youth career
- Al-Fujairah

Senior career*
Years	Team	Apps	(Gls)
2007–2012	Ittihad Kalba		
2012	Baniyas		
2012–2015	Al-Nasr		
2015–2022	Ajman		
- * Club domestic league appearances and goals

Rashid Malallah (Arabic:راشد مال الله) (born 9 December 1987) is an Emirati footballer who plays as a defender.

== Career ==
=== Al Fujairah ===
Malallah started his career at Al-Fujairah and is a product of their youth system.

=== Ittihak Klaba ===
In 2007 he signed with Ittihad Kalba and played seasons with them.

=== Baniyas ===
He left Ittihad Kalba and signed with Baniyas, but he did not play with them and the contract was broken on 25 July 2012.

=== Al-Nasr ===
On 1 August 2012 Malallah signed with Al-Nasr.

=== Ajman ===
On 12 February 2015 Malallah left Al-Nasr and signed with Ajman.
