= Rashed Eisa =

Emirati footballer (born 1990)

Personal information
- Full name: Rashed Eisa Al Falasi
- Date of birth: 24 August 1990 (age 36)
- Place of birth: United Arab Emirates
- Height: 1.72 m (5 ft 7 1/2 in)
- Position: Midfielder

Team information
- Current team: Al-Arabi
- Number: 24

Senior career*
Years	Team	Apps	(Gls)
2007–2015	Al Wasl	52	(11)
2014–2015	→ Al Ain FC (loan)	18	(3)
2015–2017	Al Ain FC	20	(2)
2017	Al Shabab	11	(0)
2017–2018	Al Nasr	9	(1)
2019–2020	Khor Fakkan	1	(0)
2021–2022	Al-Arabi		
2022–2023	Hatta		
2023–	Al-Arabi		

International career^{‡}
2012	United Arab Emirates U23	2	(1)
- * Club domestic league appearances and goals ‡ National team caps and goals as of 29 July 2012

Rashed Eisa Al Falasi (Arabic: راشد عيسى; born 24 August 1990), commonly known as Rashed Eisa, is an Emirati footballer who plays for Al-Arabi as a midfielder.

He competed for United Arab Emirates in the 2012 Summer Olympics.
