= Fawaz Awana =

Emirati footballer (born 1988)

Personal information
- Full name: Fawaz Awana Ahmed Hussein Al Musabi
- Date of birth: 25 November 1988 (age 37)
- Place of birth: Abu Dhabi, UAE
- Height: 1.77 m (5 ft 10 in)
- Position: Midfielder

Team information
- Current team: Baniyas
- Number: 7

Youth career
- Baniyas

Senior career*
Years	Team	Apps	(Gls)
2009−2016	Baniyas		
2016–2018	Al-Nasr		
2018–	Baniyas		
2019	→ Al Wahda (loan)		
- * Club domestic league appearances and goals

Fawaz Awana Ahmed Hussein Al Musabi (Arabic: فواز عوانة; born 25 November 1988), known as Fawaz Awana, is an Emirati footballer who plays as a midfielder for Baniyas.

== Club career ==
=== Baniyas ===
==== 2010–11 season ====
In this season was his debut with the first team. On 2 September 2010, in the game against Al Dhafra, Fawaz made his official league debut for the first team when he came on as a substitute for Haboush Saleh in the 90th minute. After a month, on 9 October, he followed with another match also as a substitute in the Etisalat Cup against Al Nasr.

== Personal life ==
Fawaz is Theyab brother, who died in a traffic accident.

== Career Statistics ==
=== Club ===
As of 15 September 2011

Club	Season	League			Cup			President Cup			Champions League			Total		
Club	Season	Apps	Goals	Assists	Apps	Goals	Assists	Apps	Goals	Assists	Apps	Goals	Assists	Apps	Goals	Assists
Baniyas B	2009–10	5	0	0	—									5	0	0
Baniyas B	2010–11	15	3	0	—									15	3	0
Baniyas B	Total	20	3	0	—									20	3	0
Baniyas	2010–11	4	0	0	8	0	0	0	0	0	—			12	0	0
Baniyas	2011–12	0	0	0	1	0	0	0	0	0	0	0	0	1	0	0
Total		4	0	0	9	0	0	—						13	3	0
Career total		24	3	0	9	0	0	—						33	3	0
