= Waleed Salem =

Waleed Salem is a given name. Notable people with the name include:

- Waleed Salem Sulaiman (born 1980), Emirati footballer
- Waleed Salem Al-Lami (born 1992), Iraqi footballer
