= Khalid Eisa =

Emirati-American footballer (born 1989)

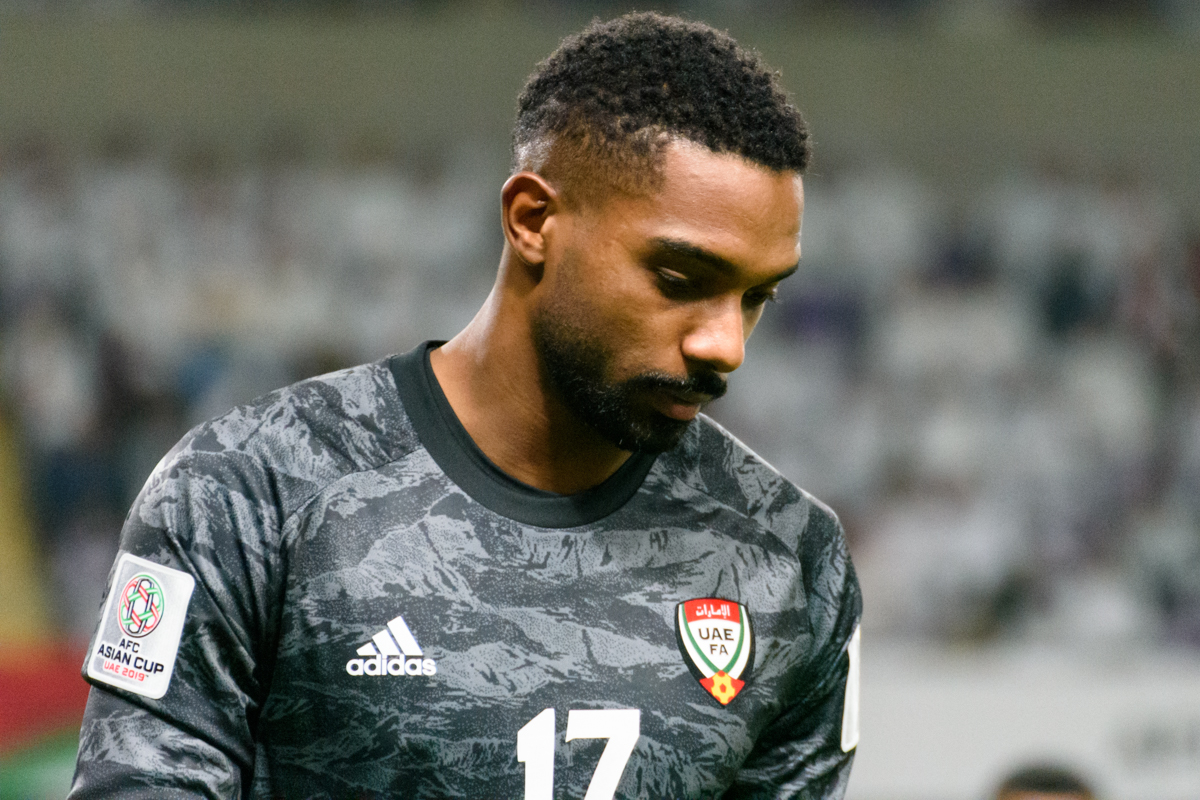
- Khalid with the UAE at the 2019 AFC Asian Cup

Personal information
- Full name: Khalid Eisa Mohammed Bilal Saeed Al-Mesmari
- Date of birth: 15 September 1989 (age 37)
- Place of birth: Dubai, United Arab Emirates
- Height: 1.76 m (5 ft 9 in)
- Position: Goalkeeper

Team information
- Current team: Al Ain
- Number: 17

Youth career
- 2007–2010: Al Jazira

Senior career*
Years	Team	Apps	(Gls)
2010–2013	Al Jazira	16	(0)
2013–	Al Ain	303	(0)

International career^{‡}
2011–2013	United Arab Emirates U20	2	(0)
2012	United Arab Emirates U23	5	(0)
2011–	United Arab Emirates	98	(0)
Medal record
Men's football
Representing United Arab Emirates
AFC Asian Cup
Third place	2015 Australia
- * Club domestic league appearances and goals as of 17 September 2026 ‡ National team caps and goals as of 17 September 2026

Khalid Eisa Mohammed Bilal Saeed Al-Mesmari (Arabic: خَالِد عِيسَى مُحَمَّد بِلَال سَعِيد الْمِسْمَارِيّ; born 15 September 1989) is an Emirati professional footballer who plays as a goalkeeper for and captains UAE Pro League club Al Ain and the United Arab Emirates national team. He competed at the 2012 Summer Olympics and the 2025 FIFA Club World Cup.

== Club career ==
=== Al Ain ===
On 17 July 2013, Khalid moved to Al Ain in undisclosed deal.

== International career ==
On 4 January 2024, Khalid was named in the UAE's squad for the 2023 AFC Asian Cup.

== Career statistics ==
=== International ===
As of match played 5 June 2025

Appearances and goals by national team and year
National team	Year	Apps	Goals
United Arab Emirates	2011	0	0
United Arab Emirates	2012	1	0
United Arab Emirates	2013	2	0
United Arab Emirates	2014	4	0
United Arab Emirates	2015	8	0
United Arab Emirates	2016	2	0
United Arab Emirates	2017	7	0
United Arab Emirates	2018	8	0
United Arab Emirates	2019	12	0
United Arab Emirates	2020	2	0
United Arab Emirates	2021	1	0
United Arab Emirates	2022	8	0
United Arab Emirates	2023	8	0
United Arab Emirates	2024	17	0
United Arab Emirates	2025	3	0
Total		83	0

== Honours ==
Al Jazira

- UAE Pro League: 2010–11
- UAE President's Cup: 2010–11, 2011–12

Al Ain

- UAE Pro League: 2014–15, 2017–18, 2021–22
- UAE League Cup: 2021–22
- UAE President's Cup: 2013–14, 2017–18
- UAE Super Cup: 2015
- AFC Champions League: 2024; runner-up: 2016
- FIFA Club World Cup runner-up: 2018

United Arab Emirates

- Arabian Gulf Cup: 2013
- AFC Asian Cup third-place: 2015

Individual

- Arabian Gulf Cup Best Goalkeeper: 2018
- UAE Pro League Golden Glove: 2021–22
