= Salem Abdullah (footballer, born 1986) =

Emirati footballer

Personal information
- Full name: Salem Abdullah Omar Salem Ba Abdullah
- Date of birth: 5 July 1986 (age 40)
- Place of birth: United Arab Emirates
- Height: 1.68 m (5 ft 6 in)
- Position: Midfielder

Senior career*
Years	Team	Apps	(Gls)
2006–2014	Al-Ain		
2014–2016	Al Wasl		
2016–2019	Al Jazira		

International career
2009	UAE	2	(0)
- * Club domestic league appearances and goals

Salem Abdullah Omar Salem Ba Abdullah (Arabic: سالم عبد الله عمر سالم باعبد الله; born 5 July 1986) is an Emarati footballer who plays as a midfielder.
