= Hazza Salem =

Emirati footballer (born 1989)

Personal information
- Full name: Hazza Salem Al Faresi
- Date of birth: December 19, 1989 (age 36)
- Place of birth: Dubai, United Arab Emirates
- Height: 1.78 m (5 ft 10 in)
- Position: Right-back

Youth career
- Al Ain

Senior career*
Years	Team	Apps	(Gls)
2010–2014	Al Ain	28	(1)
2012–2013	→ Al Dhafra (loan)	23	(1)
2014–2019	Al Wasl	88	(1)
2019–2020	Al Nasr	6	(0)
2020–2021	→ Khor Fakkan (loan)	20	(0)
2021–2022	Dibba Al Fujairah	0	(0)
2022–2024	Al Wasl	17	(0)
- * Club domestic league appearances and goals

Hazza Salem Mohd Saeed Al Faresi (Arabic: هزاع سالم محمد سعيد الفارسي; born 1 January 1989) is an Emirati footballer who plays as a right back.

He played twice for Al Wasl FC at 2010 AFC Champions League.
