= Mohammed Fayez =

Emirati footballer (born 1989)

Personal information
- Full name: Mohammed Fayez Sbait Khalifa Al-Alawi
- Date of birth: 6 October 1989 (age 37)
- Place of birth: United Arab Emirates
- Height: 1.79 m (5 ft 10 in)
- Position: Left-back

Youth career
- Al Ain

Senior career*
| Years | Team | Apps | (Gls) |
| 2008–2021 | Al Ain | 93 | (0) |
- * Club domestic league appearances and goals

Mohamed Fayez Sbait Khalifa Al-Alawi (Arabic: محمد فايز; born 6 October 1989) is an Emarati footballer who plays as a left back.

Fayez was born in Ghana. A midfielder, he did not take part in the 2010 AFC Champions League.

== Honours ==
=== Club ===
Al Ain

- UAE Pro League: 2011–12, 2012–13, 2014–15, 2017–18
- UAE League Cup: 2008–09
- UAE President's Cup: 2008–09, 2013–14, 2017–18
- UAE Super Cup: 2009, 2012, 2015
- Emirati-Moroccan Super Cup: 2015
- AFC Champions League runner-up: 2016
- FIFA Club World Cup runner-up: 2018

=== Individual ===
- Fans' Asian Champions League XI: 2016
