= 2013–14 UAE League Cup =

2013–14 Arabian Gulf Cup
Tournament details
- Country: United Arab Emirates
- Teams: 14

Final positions
- Champions: Al Ahli
- Runners-up: Al Jazira

The UAE League Cup, currently known as the Arabian Gulf Cup and previously known as the Emirates Cup followed a new simplified format for the 2013/14 season. The fourteen teams, sorted by draw into two groups of seven teams each, played each other only once during the group stages, with home or away fixtures also decided by draw. After the 7 rounds of the group stage, the top two teams of each group progressed to the semi-finals of the competition, with the first-placed side gaining home advantage. The semi-finals were won by Al Jazira (on penalties) and Al Ahli to set up the Arabian Gulf Cup final between the two sides, on Saturday 19 April 2014. The Arabian Gulf Cup final was played at the neutral venue of the Hazza bin Zayed Stadium in Al Ain, which Al Ahli won 2–1.

== Group stage ==
=== Group A ===
Team	Pld	W	D	L	GF	GA	GD	Pts
Sharjah	6	5	1	0	11	2	+9	16
Al Jazira	6	4	0	2	9	9	0	12
Al Ain	6	3	1	2	11	9	+2	10
Bani Yas	6	3	1	2	9	7	+2	10
Al Shaab	6	1	2	3	7	10	−3	5
Dubai	6	1	1	4	6	10	−4	4
Al Wahda	6	1	0	5	3	9	−6	3

Source: Soccerway

=== Group B ===
Team	Pld	W	D	L	GF	GA	GD	Pts
Al Dhafra	6	5	0	1	18	6	+12	15
Al Ahli	6	3	2	1	11	7	+4	11
Al Nasr	6	3	0	3	9	9	0	9
Ajman	6	2	2	2	6	8	−2	8
Al Wasl	6	2	0	4	8	12	−4	6
Emirates	6	1	2	3	6	10	−4	5
Al Shabab	6	1	2	3	4	10	−6	5

Source: Soccerway

== Semi-finals ==
15 March 2014
13:50

Al Dhafra	2 – 2 2 - 4p	Al Jazira

15 March 2014
16:30

Sharjah	0 – 1	Al Ahli

== Final ==
19 April 2014
16:30

Al Jazira	1 – 2	Al Ahli
