= Helal Saeed =

Emirati footballer (born 1977)

Personal information
- Full name: Helal Saeed Humaid Saeed Al Saeedi
- Date of birth: 12 May 1977 (age 49)
- Place of birth: Al Ain, UAE
- Height: 1.71 m (5 ft 7 in)
- Position: Midfielder

Senior career*
Years	Team	Apps	(Gls)
1996–2008	Al Ain	122	(38)
2008–2011	Al Jazira	41	(1)
2011–2016	Al Ain	48	(0)

International career
2005–2009	UAE	37	(0)
- * Club domestic league appearances and goals as of 08:00, 15 September 2014 (UTC)

Helal Saeed Humaid Saeed Al Saeed (Arabic: هلال سعيد حميد سعيد آل سعيد; born 12 May 1977), simply known as Helal Saeed is a former Emirati professional footballer who played as a midfielder.

== Honours ==
Al Ain

- UAE Pro-League: 1997-98, 1999-2000, 2001-02, 2002-03, 2003-04, 2011-12, 2014-15
- UAE President Cup: 1998-99, 2000-01, 2004-03, 2005-06, 2008-09, 2014-15
- UAE Super Cup: 2003-04, 2012-13, 2015-16
- UAE League Cup: 2008-09
- GCC Champion League: 2001-02
- AFC Champions League: 2003-04

Al Jazira

- UAE Pro League: 2010-11
- UAE President Cup: 2010-11
- UAE League Cup: 2009-10

UAE

- Gulf Cup: 2007-08
