= Yousif Al Bairaq =

Emirati footballer (born 1989)

Personal information
- Full name: Yousif Abdelrahman Ali; Abdelrahman Al Bairaq
- Date of birth: 4 March 1989 (age 37)
- Place of birth: UAE
- Height: 1.81 m (5 ft 11 in)
- Position: Goalkeeper

Youth career
- Ittihad Kalba

Senior career*
| Years | Team | Apps | (Gls) |
| 2009 | Ittihad Kalba | 0 | (0) |
| 2009–2014 | Al Ain | 1 | (0) |
| 2012–2013 | → Al Shaab (loan) | 0 | (0) |
| 2014–2015 | Al Dhafra SCC | 0 | (0) |

International career^{‡}
| 2008–2009 | UAE U20 | 30 | (0) |
| 2009 | UAE | 1 | (0) |
- * Club domestic league appearances and goals as of 8 August 2014 (UTC) ‡ National team caps and goals as of 25 November 2009 (UTC)

Yousif Abd-El-Rahman Ali Abd-El-Rahman Al-Bairaq (or translate as Yousef Abdulrahman) (Arabic: يوسف عبد الرحمن; born 4 March 1989) is an Emirati goalkeeper He currently plays for Fujairah SC club And UAE National U20.

He played once at 2010 AFC Champions League, the last group stage match.

== International career ==
In November 2009, he was call-up to the national team against Manchester City, Czech Republic and Iraq. He played the match against Iraq.

== Career statistics ==
=== Club ===
| Club | Season | League | | | Cup^{2} | | | Asia^{1} | | | Total | | |
| Club | Season | Apps | Goals | Saves | Apps | Goals | Saves | Apps | Goals | Saves | Apps | Goals | Saves |
|---|---|---|---|---|---|---|---|---|---|---|---|---|---|
| Al Ain | 2009–10 | 0 | 0 | 0 | 1 | 0 | 3 | 0 | 0 | 0 | 0 | 0 | 0 |
| Al Ain | Total | 0 | 0 | 0 | 0 | 0 | 0 | 0 | 0 | 0 | 0 | 0 | 0 |
| Career Totals | | 0 | 0 | 0 | 0 | 0 | 0 | 0 | 0 | 0 | 0 | 0 | 0 |

^{1}Continental competitions include the AFC Champions League
^{2}Other tournaments include the UAE President Cup and Etisalat Emirates Cup

=== National team ===
As of 27 September 2009

| Team | Season | Cup^{2} | | | Asia^{1} | | | Total | | |
| Team | Season | Apps | Goals | Saves | Apps | Goals | Saves | Apps | Goals | Saves |
|---|---|---|---|---|---|---|---|---|---|---|
| UAE U20 | 2009 | 5 | 0 | 5 | 0 | 0 | 0 | 0 | 0 | 0 |
| UAE U20 | Total | 0 | 0 | 0 | 0 | 0 | 0 | 0 | 0 | 0 |
| Career Totals | | 0 | 0 | 0 | 0 | 0 | 0 | 0 | 0 | 0 |

^{1}Continental competitions include the AFC U-19 Championship
^{2}Other tournaments include the FIFA U-20 World Cup
