= Rashed Ali =

Emirati footballer (born 1989)

Personal information
- Full name: Rashed Ali Salem Mubarak Al-Sowaidi
- Date of birth: 2 December 1989 (age 36)
- Place of birth: United Arab Emirates
- Height: 1.77 m (5 ft 10 in)
- Position: Goalkeeper

Team information
- Current team: Khor Fakkan
- Number: 50

Youth career
- Al-Wasl

Senior career*
Years	Team	Apps	(Gls)
2009–2017	Al-Wasl		
2017–2025	Al-Wahda	59	(0)
2025–	Khor Fakkan	0	(0)
- * Club domestic league appearances and goals

Rashed Ali Salem Mubarak Al-Sowaidi (Arabic: راشد علي سالم مبارك السويدي; born 2 December 1989) is an Emirati footballer. He currently plays as a goalkeeper for Khor Fakkan.
