= Mohammed Ali Ayed =

Emirati footballer (born 1990)

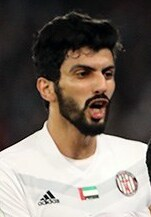
- Ayed in 2017

Personal information
- Full name: Mohammed Ali Ayed Metlaq Alshimmari
- Date of birth: 13 October 1990 (age 36)
- Place of birth: United Arab Emirates
- Height: 1.82 m (6 ft 0 in)
- Position: Defender

Senior career*
Years	Team	Apps	(Gls)
2010–2014	Al Ain		
2014–2017	Al-Shabab		
2017–2018	Al Jazira		
2018–2022	Al-Nasr		
- * Club domestic league appearances and goals

Mohammed Ali Ayed Metlaq Alshimmari (Arabic: محمد علي عايض)is an Emirati footballer who plays as a defender.

== Career stats ==
CAREER STATS
	MATCHES	GOALS	YELLOW CARDS	RED CARDS
2016 - 2017	24	0	6	1
2015 - 2016	26	2	6	0
2014 - 2015	29	2	6	3
2013 - 2014	18	0	8	1
2012 - 2013	25	2	9	1
2011 - 2012	23	1	9	0
2010 - 2011	21	1	5	0
2009 - 2010	1	0	0	0
2008 - 2009	0	0	0	0
Overall	167	8	49	6
