= Sultan Al Ghaferi =

Emirati footballer (born 1986)

Personal information
- Full name: Sultan Al Ghaferi
- Date of birth: 18 September 1986 (age 40)
- Place of birth: United Arab Emirates
- Height: 1.73 m (5 ft 8 in)
- Position: Midfielder

Youth career
- Baniyas

Senior career*
Years	Team	Apps	(Gls)
2006–2013	Baniyas		
2013–2015	Al Ain	12	(0)
2015–2019	Al Wehda	87	(2)
2019–2020	Al Jazira	1	(0)
2020–2024	Al Dhafra	55	(2)
- * Club domestic league appearances and goals as of 22:20, 20 December 2022 (UTC)

Sultan Al Ghaferi (Arabic: سلطان الغافري) (born 18 September 1986) is an Emirati professional footballer who plays as a midfielder. He transferred from Baniyas to Al Ain in the summer of 2013.
