= Mohanad Salem =

Emirati footballer (born 1985)

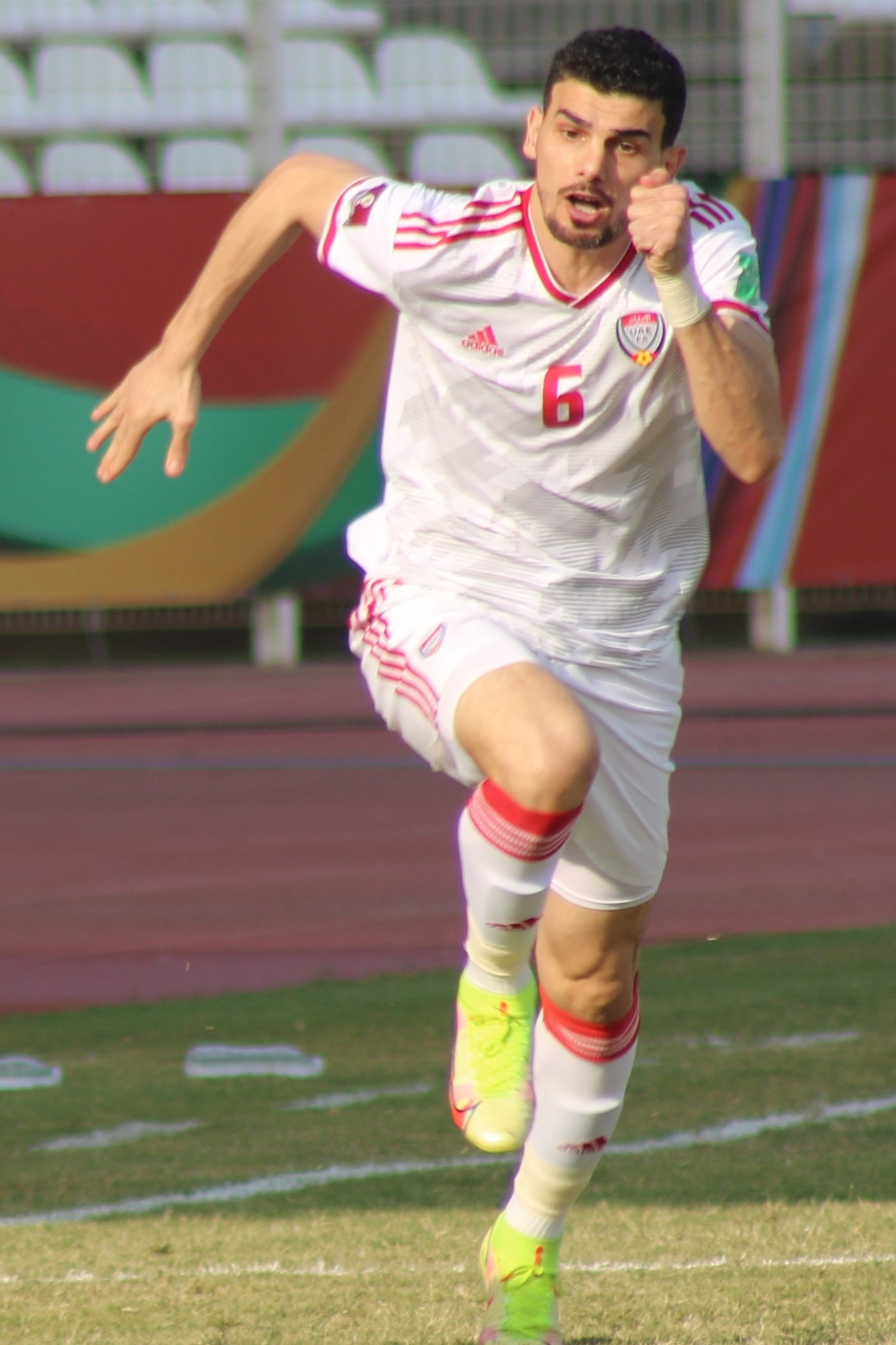
- Salem with the United Arab Emirates in 2021

Personal information
- Full name: Mohanad Salem Ghazi Marzouq Al-Amim Al-Enazi
- Date of birth: 1 March 1985 (age 41)
- Place of birth: Dubai, United Arab Emirates
- Height: 1.85 m (6 ft 1 in)
- Position: Defender

Youth career
- 2003–2006: Al-Wahda

Senior career*
Years	Team	Apps	(Gls)
2006–2008	Al-Dhafra	11	(0)
2008–2022	Al-Ain	181	(13)
2021–2022	→ Al-Ittihad Kalba (loan)	15	(1)

International career^{‡}
2008–2021	United Arab Emirates	68	(2)
- * Club domestic league appearances and goals ‡ National team caps and goals as of 19:21, 28 November 2021 (UTC)

Mohanad Salem Ghazi Marzouq Al-Amim Al-Enazi (Arabic: مهند سالم غازي مرزوق العميم العنزي; born 1 March 1985) is an Emirati former professional footballer who played as a defender for the United Arab Emirates national team.

At club level, he has played in the 2010 AFC Champions League. Salem has also represented the United Arab Emirates internationally since 2008.

== Personal life ==
Salem is the brother of former footballer Mohammed Salem Al-Enazi.

== Career statistics ==
=== International ===
Scores and results list United Arab Emirates' goal tally first.

Goal	Date	Venue	Opponent	Score	Result	Competition
1.	27 May 2014	Stade de la Fontenette, Carouge, Switzerland	Armenia	3–4	3–4	Friendly
2.	3 September 2015	Zayed Sports City Stadium, Abu Dhabi, United Arab Emirates	Malaysia	1–0	10–0	2018 FIFA World Cup qualification

== Honours ==
United Arab Emirates

- Arabian Gulf Cup: 2013
- AFC Asian Cup third-place: 2015

=== Al Ain ===
- AFC Champions League: finalist 2016
