= Fares Jumaa =

Emirati footballer (born 1988)

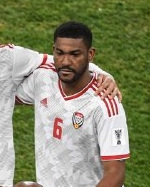
- Jumaa with United Arab Emirates in 2019

Personal information
- Full name: Fares Jumaa Hasan Jumaa Al Saadi
- Date of birth: 30 December 1988 (age 37)
- Place of birth: Al Ain, United Arab Emirates
- Height: 1.83 m (6 ft 0 in)
- Position: Centre back

Senior career*
Years	Team	Apps	(Gls)
2007–2015	Al-Ain	77	(6)
2015–2020	Al-Jazira	78	(10)
2020–2024	Al-Wahda	57	(3)
2024–2025	Dubai United		

International career^{‡}
2008–2020	United Arab Emirates	64	(2)
- * Club domestic league appearances and goals as of 5 January 2022 ‡ National team caps and goals as of 28 December 2018

Fares Jumaa Hasan Jumaa Al Saadi (Arabic: فارس جمعة حسن جمعة السعدي; born 30 December 1988) is an Emirati footballer who plays as a defender. He played for the United Arab Emirates national football team in the 2010 FIFA World Cup qualifying rounds.

== Personal life ==
Fares Juma is the brother of the Emirati footballer Saeed Jumaa, the 2018 FIFA Club World Cup finalist and 2024 AFC Champions League Winner.

== International goals ==
#	Date	Venue	Opponent	Score	Result	Competition
?	29 November 2010	Aden	Bahrain	3–1	Win	20th Arabian Gulf Cup
