= Ahmed Abdulla Al Shamisi =

Emirati footballer (born 1988)

Ahmed Al Shamisi
Personal information
- Full name: Ahmed Abdulla Mohammed Al Shamisi
- Date of birth: 3 March 1988 (age 38)
- Place of birth: United Arab Emirates
- Height: 1.76 m (5 ft 9 1/2 in)
- Position: Midfielder

Youth career
- Al-Ain

Senior career*
Years	Team	Apps	(Gls)
2009–2014	Al-Ain		
2014–2018	Al-Wasl		
2017–2018	→ Emirates Club (loan)		
2018–2019	Baniyas		
- * Club domestic league appearances and goals

Ahmed Abdulla (born. Ahmed Abdulla Mohamed Abdulla Al Shamisi) is an Emarati footballer who plays as a midfielder.

He did not take part in the 2010 AFC Champions League.
