= Mohamed Ahmed (Emirati footballer) =

Emirati footballer (born 1989)

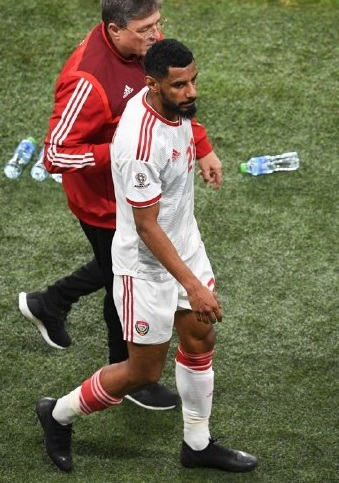
- Mohamed Ahmed with United Arab Emirates at the 2019 AFC Asian Cup

Personal information
- Full name: Mohamed Ahmed Ali Gharib Juma
- Date of birth: 16 April 1989 (age 37)
- Place of birth: Dubai, United Arab Emirates
- Height: 1.81 m (5 ft 11 in)
- Position: Defender

Youth career
- Al-Shabab

Senior career*
Years	Team	Apps	(Gls)
2006–2012	Al-Shabab	31	(1)
2012–2023	Al Ain	114	(5)
2023–2025	Al Bataeh	52	(1)

International career^{‡}
2008–2009	United Arab Emirates U-20	20	(1)
2012	United Arab Emirates U-23	6	(2)
2011–2019	United Arab Emirates	57	(2)
- * Club domestic league appearances and goals as of 30 December 2021 ‡ National team caps and goals as of 25 January 2019

Mohamed Ahmed Ali Gharib Juma (Arabic: محمد أحمد; born 16 April 1989) is an Emirati footballer, who plays . He is best known for scoring at the 2009 FIFA U-20 World Cup in Egypt, giving the UAE a historic win against Venezuela on their way to the quarter-finals.

== International goals ==
Scores and results list the UAE's goal tally first.

Goal	Date	Venue	Opponent	Score	Result	Competition
1.	5 January 2013	Khalifa Sports City Stadium, Isa Town, Bahrain	Qatar	3–1	3–1	21st Arabian Gulf Cup
2.	3 September 2015	Sheikh Zayed Stadium, Abu Dhabi, United Arab Emirates	Malaysia	7–0	10–0	2018 FIFA World Cup qualification

== Honours ==
United Arab Emirates

- Arabian Gulf Cup: 2013
- AFC Asian Cup third place: 2015

Individual

- Fans' Asian Champions League XI: 2016
