= Ibrahim Diaky =

Ivorian footballer (born 1982)

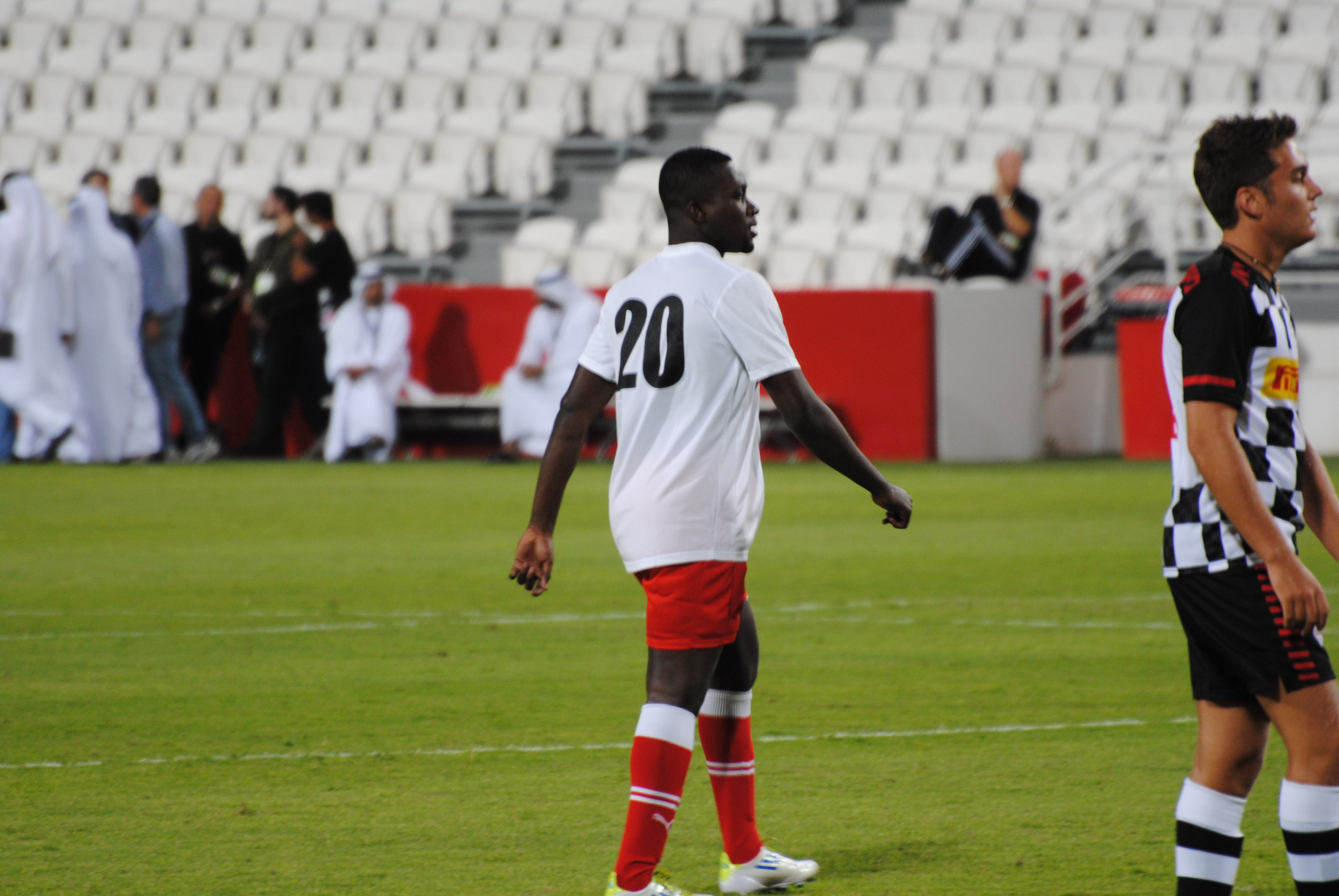
- Diaky in 2011

Personal information
- Full name: Ibrahim Amuah Diaky
- Date of birth: May 24, 1982 (age 44)
- Place of birth: Abidjan, Ivory Coast
- Height: 1.77 m (5 ft 10 in)
- Position: Midfielder

Senior career*
Years	Team	Apps	(Gls)
2000–2001	ASEC Mimosas	18	(4)
2002–2005	Esperance Tunis	38	(21)
2005–2013	Al Jazira	215	(52)
2006	→ Al Ain (loan)	6	(1)
2013–2019	Al Ain	42	(7)

International career^{‡}
2001	Ivory Coast	1	(0)
- * Club domestic league appearances and goals as of 3 April 2015 ‡ National team caps and goals as of February 20, 2010

Ibrahim Amuah Diaky (born May 24, 1982) is an Ivorian former footballer player who played as a midfielder.

== Personal life ==
Diaky was born in Abidjan, Ivory Coast in 1982. He was granted the Emirati passport in late 2006.
