= 2013–14 UAE President's Cup =

Tournament details
- Country: United Arab Emirates
- Teams: 28

Final positions
- Champions: Al-Ain
- Runners-up: Al-Ahli

Tournament statistics
- Matches played: 43
- Goals scored: 144 (3.35 per match)

The 2013–14 UAE President's Cup is the 38th season of the UAE President's Cup, the premier knockout tournament for association football clubs in the United Arab Emirates. The reigning champions are Al Ahli, having won their eighth title last season which is a national record held jointly with Al-Sharjah. The winners will qualify for the group stage of the 2015 AFC Champions League.

After a change to the format from the 2011–12 season was a success last year, then the competition will continue along the same lines. 14 teams from UAE Division 1 took place in a group stage with 2 groups of four and 2 groups of three, with the group winners advancing to a play-off stage. The two winners of the play-off matches will join the 14 Pro-League teams in the round of 16.

== First round ==
=== Group A ===
Pos	Team	Pld	W	D	L	GF	GA	GD	Pts
1	Al Fujairah	6	3	2	1	14	5	+9	11 (Note: Al Urooba 2-3 Al Fujairah)
2	Al Urooba	6	3	2	1	15	8	+7	11
3	Masafi	6	2	1	3	9	14	−5	7
4	Al Ramms	6	0	3	3	7	18	−11	3

Source: Futbol24

=== Group B ===
Pos	Team	Pld	W	D	L	GF	GA	GD	Pts
1	Dibba Al-Hisn	4	3	0	1	7	2	+5	9
2	Dubba Al Fujairah	4	2	0	2	5	5	0	6
3	Al Khaleej Club	4	1	0	3	3	8	−5	3

Source: Futbol24

=== Group C ===
Pos	Team	Pld	W	D	L	GF	GA	GD	Pts
1	Hatta	4	4	0	0	11	3	+8	12
2	Al Jazira Al Hamra	4	1	1	2	4	9	−5	4
3	Al-Arabi	4	0	1	3	6	9	−3	1

Source: Futbol24

=== Group D ===
Pos	Team	Pld	W	D	L	GF	GA	GD	Pts
1	Al-Thaid	4	3	0	1	9	3	+6	9
2	Ittihad Kalba	4	3	0	1	9	3	+6	9
3	Al-Taawon	4	0	0	4	0	12	−12	0 (Note: Al Taawon withdrew and all results were awarded 3:0 in favour of their opponents.)

Source: Futbol24

== Second round ==
The four group winners from the first round entered at this stage.

3 November 2013

Al Fujairah	4 – 1	Hatta

3 November 2013

Al Thaid	2 – 1	Dibba Al-Hisn

The winners of each match advanced to the round of 16.

== Round of 16 ==
The two winning teams from the second round join the 14 Pro-League teams in this round.

9 December 2013

Al Wasl	2 – 1 (a.e.t.)	Ajman

9 December 2013

Al Nasr	3 – 2 (a.e.t.)	Al Fujairah

9 December 2013

Al Thaid	2 – 2 (a.e.t.)	Al Shaab Sharjah
Penalties
	5 – 6

9 December 2013

Dubai	1 – 4	Al Shabab

10 December 2013

Al Ain	4 – 1	Al Sharjah

10 December 2013

Emirates	1 – 3	Al Ahli

10 December 2013

Al Dhafra	2 – 1	Bani Yas

10 December 2013

Al Jazira	0 – 1	Al Wahda

== Quarter-finals ==
13 January 2014

Al Thaid	2 – 3	Al Nasr

13 January 2014

Al Dhafra	1 – 0 (a.e.t.)	Al Shabab

13 January 2014

Al Ain	2 – 2 (a.e.t.)	Al Wasl
Penalties
	9 – 8

13 January 2014

Al Wahda	2 – 4	Al Ahli

== Semi-finals ==
30 January 2014

Al Dhafra	1 – 2 (a.e.t.)	Al Ahli

30 January 2014

Al Ain	2 – 1	Al Nasr

== Final ==
18 May 2014

Al Ahli	0 – 1	Al Ain
		Asamoah Gyan 33'

Zayed Sports City
Attendance: 29,000
Referee: Ammar Al-Junaibi (UAE)
