= 2012–13 Al Ain FC season =

Al Ain
2012–13 season
- President: Mohammed Bin Zayed
- Manager: Cosmin Olăroiu
- Stadium: Tahnoun bin Mohammed
- League: 1st
- Super Cup: Winners
- President's Cup: Semi-finals
- League Cup: Group Stage
- Champions League: Group Stage
- Top goalscorer: League: Asamoah Gyan (31); All: Asamoah Gyan (32)
- Biggest win: 7–0 vs Al Dhafra; 6–0 vs Ittihad Kalba; 5–0 vs Al Wasl
- Biggest defeat: 3–6 vs Al Ahli
| Home colours | Away colours | Third colours |
- All statistics correct as of 24 May 2013.

The 2012–13 season was Al Ain Football Club's 45th in existence and the club's 38th consecutive season in the top-level football league in the UAE.

== Club ==
=== Technical staff ===
| Position | Staff |
|---|---|
| Head coach | (Romania) Cosmin Olăroiu |
| Assistant coach | (Romania) Cătălin Necula (Romania) Gabriel Caramarin (Italy) Massimo Pedrazzini |
| Translator | (Lebanon) Hussein Fakih |
| Fitness Coach | (Italy) Ferdinando Hippoliti |
| Goalkeeping coach | (Romania) Vasile Iordache |
| Head of Performance Analysis | (England) Liam Weeks |
| Academy Director | (England) Wayne Harrison |
| Reserve team head coach | (United Arab Emirates) Ahmed Abdullah |
| Team Manager | (United Arab Emirates) Matar Obaid Al Sahbani |
| Physiotherapist | (Romania) Ion Buduga (Greece) Apostolos Dritsas (Egypt) Abdelnasser Aljohny (Poland) Wiesław Sojka (Greece) Georgios Bosineaus |
| Team Supervisor | (United Arab Emirates) Mohammed Obeid Hammad |
| Team Administrator | (United Arab Emirates) Nasser Al Junaibi |
| Doctor | (Greece) Nikolaos Tzouroudis |

Last updated: 23 August 2012
Source: AlKhaleej.ae

=== Board of directors ===
| Office | Name |
|---|---|
| President | Mohammed Bin Zayed Al Nahyan |
| First Deputy President | Hazza bin Zayed Al Nahyan |
| Second Deputy President | Tahnoon Bin Zayed Al Nahyan |
| Chairman of Board of Directors | Abdullah bin Mohammed bin Khaled Al Nahyan |
| Vice Chairman of Board of Directors | Rashid bin Mubarak Al Hajri |
| Member of Board of Directors | Awad bin Hasom Al Darmaki |
| Member of Board of Directors | Hamad Nekhirat Al Ameri |
| Member of Board of Directors | Mohammed Abdullah bin Bdouh |
| Member of Board of Directors | Mohammed bin Obaid Al Dhaheri |

Last updated: 21 November 2011
Source: Al Ain Club Official Website, AlKhaleej.ae

=== Other information ===
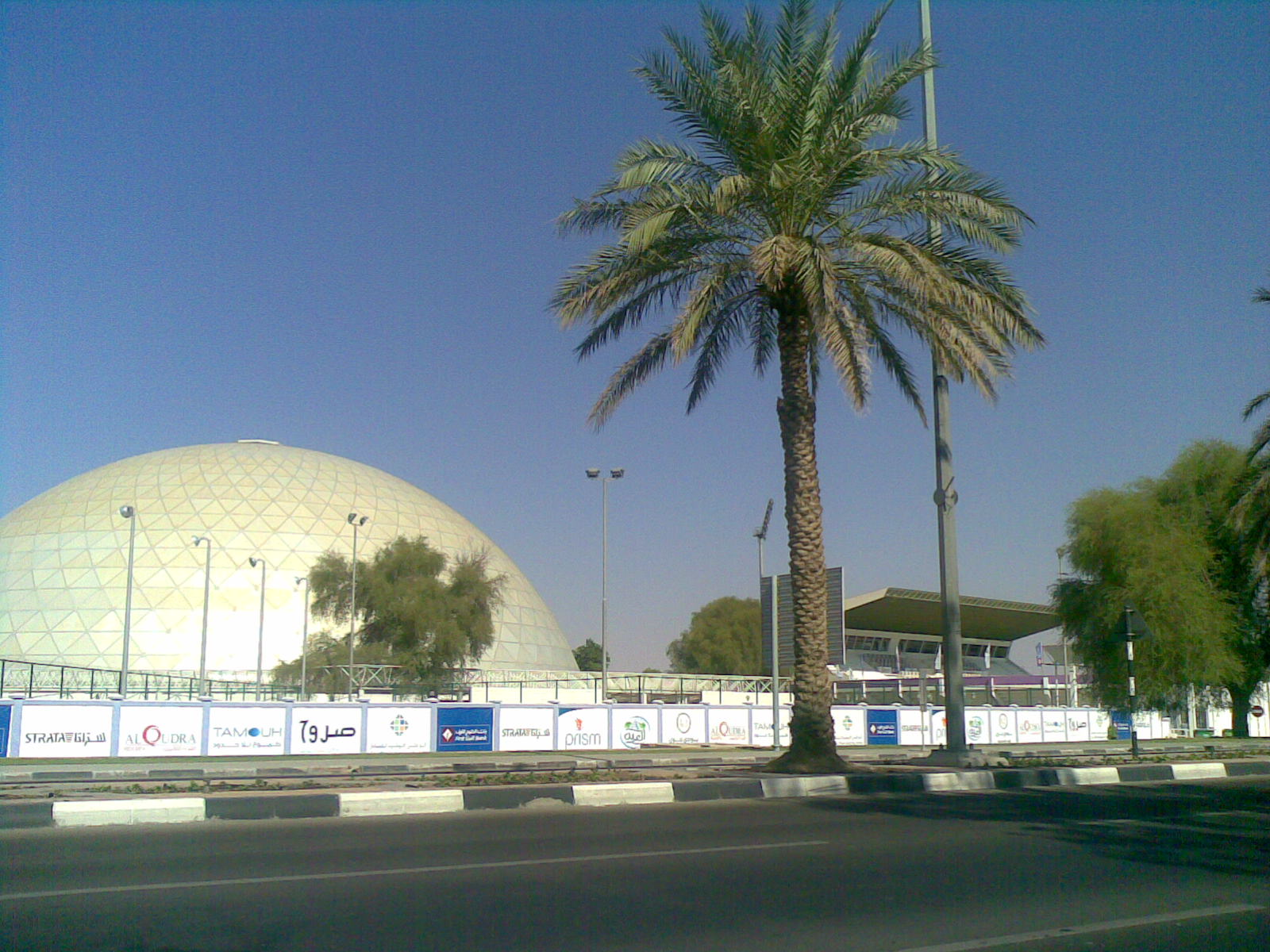

| Ground (capacity and dimensions) | Tahnoun bin Mohammed Stadium (15,000 / 91,341) |

Source: AlAinClub.ae

=== Kits ===
| Home | Away | Third |

Supplier: Adidas / Sponsor: First Gulf Bank / Sorouh / Strata / Abu Dhabi National Hotels

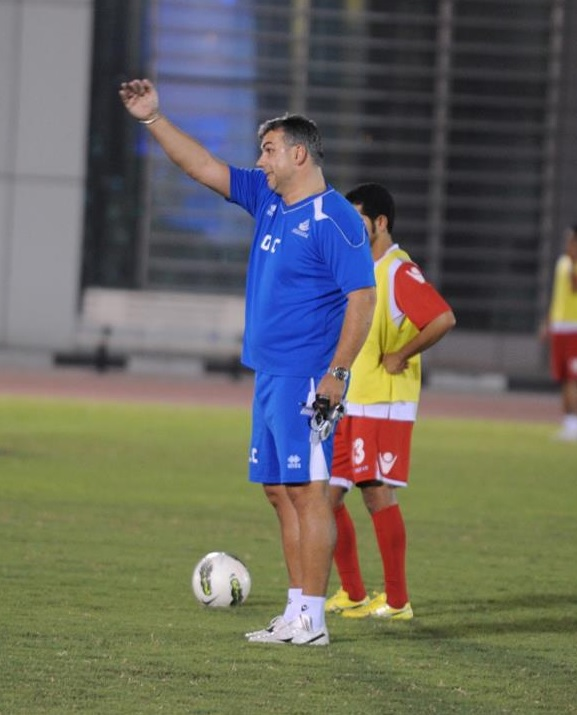
Cosmin Olăroiu at Al Ain Training In May 2013.

== Players ==
=== First team ===
| No. | Position(s) | Nationality | Name | Since | Age | Signed from |
Goalkeepers
| 12 | GK | UAE | Waleed Salem | 2001 | 32 | Youth system |
| 22 | GK | UAE | Mahmoud Al Mas | 2011 | 29 | (United Arab Emirates) Sharjah |
| 30 | GK | UAE | Abdullah Sultan | 2007 | 27 | Youth system |
| 36 | GK | UAE | Dawoud Sulaiman | 2010 | 23 | Youth system |
Defenders
| 4 | DF | UAE | Musallem Fayez | 2007 | 26 | Youth system |
| 5 | DF | UAE | Ismail Ahmed | 2008 | 29 | (Morocco) FUS de Rabat |
| — | DF | UAE | Mohammed Fayez | 2007 | 23 | Youth system |
| 15 | DF | UAE | Khaled Abdulrahman | 2010 | 24 | Youth system |
| 19 | DF | UAE | Mohanad Salem | 2008 | 28 | (United Arab Emirates) Al Dhafra |
| 21 | DF | UAE | Fawzi Fayez | 2007 | 25 | Youth system |
| 23 | DF | UAE | Mohamed Ahmed | 2012 | 24 | (United Arab Emirates) Al Shabab |
| 33 | DF | UAE | Mohammed Al-Dhahri | 2010 | 22 | Youth system |
| 44 | DF | UAE | Fares Jumaa | 2007 | 24 | Youth system |
Midfielders
| 2 | MF | UAE | Yaqoub Al Hosani | 2012 | 25 | (United Arab Emirates) Al Wahda |
| 6 | MF | ROU | Mirel Rădoi (3rd C) | 2011 | 32 | (Saudi Arabia) Al Hilal |
| 7 | MF | UAE | Ali Al-Wehaibi (VC) | 2001 | 29 | Youth system |
| 8 | MF | UAE | Mohammed Al Saadi | 2011 | 30 | (United Arab Emirates) Al Dhafra |
| 10 | MF | UAE | Omar Abdulrahman | 2008 | 21 | Youth system |
| 18 | MF | UAE | Abdullah Malallah | 2008 | 29 | (United Arab Emirates) Emirates |
| 20 | MF | UAE | Helal Saeed (C) | 2011 | 36 | (United Arab Emirates) Al Jazira |
| 25 | MF | UAE | Ahmed Al Shamisi | 2009 | 25 | Youth system |
| 27 | MF | UAE | Salem Abdullah | 2006 | 26 | Youth system |
Forwards
| 3 | FW | GHA | Asamoah Gyan | 2011 | 27 | (England) Sunderland |
| 9 | FW | FRA | Kembo Ekoko | 2012 | 25 | (France) Rennais |
| 11 | FW | UAE | Abdulaziz Fayez | 2009 | 22 | Youth system |
| 16 | FW | UAE | Mohamed Abdulrahman | 2008 | 24 | Youth system |
| 32 | FW | AUS | Alex Brosque | 2012 | 29 | (Japan) Shimizu S-Pulse |
| 29 | FW | UAE | Mohamed Malallah | 2011 | 29 | (United Arab Emirates) Ittihad Kalba |
| 45 | FW | UAE | Mohamed Naser | 2011 | 25 | (United Arab Emirates) Al Shabab |

=== From Reserve and Youth Academy ===
| No. | Nat | Position | Player | Since |
|---|---|---|---|---|
| 1 | GK | UAE | Saif Rashed | 2012 |
| 17 | DF | UAE | Mohammed Ayed | 2009 |
| 26 | DF | UAE | Abdulsalam Mohammed | 2012 |
| 28 | FW | UAE | Abdulla Al Sheeba | 2012 |
| 31 | DF | UAE | Fahad Juma | 2012 |
| 34 | MF | UAE | Sultan Nasser | 2010 |
| 37 | FW | UAE | Faraj Juma | 2010 |
| 60 | DF | UAE | Saeed Al-Menhali | 2012 |
| 39 | MF | UAE | Saqer Mohammed | 2012 |
| 43 | DF | UAE | Salem Sultan | 2012 |
| 47 | DF | UAE | Souad Mosabeh | 2012 |
| 51 | MF | UAE | Abdulrahman Ahmed | 2013 |
| 64 | MF | UAE | Rayan Yaslam | 2012 |
| 65 | FW | UAE | Yousef Ahmed | 2012 |
| 66 | FW | UAE | Majed Ahmed | 2012 |
| 68 | MF | UAE | Ahmed Barman | 2012 |
| 13 | MF | UAE | Ahmed Sahel | 2013 |

=== New contracts ===
| Date | Pos | No. | Player | Ref. | Notes |
|---|---|---|---|---|---|
| 13 September 2012 | MF | 6 | (Romania) Mirel Rădoi | | |
| 16 January 2013 | FW | 65 | (United Arab Emirates) Yousef Ahmed | | first professional contract |

== Transfers ==
=== In ===
| Date | Position | No. | Name | From | Type | Transfer window | Fee | Ref. |
|---|---|---|---|---|---|---|---|---|
| 12 May 2012 | MF | 2 | (United Arab Emirates) Yaqoub Al Hosani | (United Arab Emirates) Al Wahda | Transfer | Summer | €277,000 | |
| 7 June 2012 | DF | 23 | (United Arab Emirates) Mohamed Ahmed | (United Arab Emirates) Al Shabab | Transfer | Summer | €4,600,000 | |
| 6 July 2012 | FW | 3 | (Ghana) Asamoah Gyan | (England) Sunderland | Transfer | Summer | €7.500,000 | |
| 31 August 2012 | FW | 9 | (France) Kembo Ekoko | (France) Rennais | Transfer | Summer | €3.700,000 | |
| 26 September 2012 | FW | 32 | (Australia) Alex Brosque | (Japan) Shimizu S-Pulse | Transfer | Summer | €4.000,000 | |

=== Transfer summary ===
Undisclosed fees are not included in the transfer totals.

Expenditure

Summer: ▼€20,077,000

Winter: ▼€0,000,000

Total: ▼€20,077,000

Income

Summer: ▲€1.300,000

Winter: ▲€0,000,000

Total: ▲€1.300,000

Net totals

Summer: ▼€18,777,000

Winter: ▼€0,000,000

Total: ▼€18,777,000

=== Out ===
| Date | Position | No. | Name | To | Type | Transfer window | Fee | Ref. |
|---|---|---|---|---|---|---|---|---|
| 30 June 2012 | FW | 9 | (Saudi Arabia) Yasser Al-Qahtani | (Saudi Arabia) Al Hilal | End of loan | Summer | Free | |
| 1 June 2012 | MF | 23 | (United Arab Emirates) Shehab Ahmed | (United Arab Emirates) Ajman | Transfer | Summer | Undisclosed | |
| 7 June 2012 | GK | 39 | (United Arab Emirates) Ismail Rabee | (United Arab Emirates) Al Shabab | Swap | Summer | Free | |
| 16 June 2012 | DF | 35 | (United Arab Emirates) Hazza Salem | (United Arab Emirates) Al Dhafra | Loan | Summer | Undisclosed | |
| 16 June 2012 | MF | 26 | (United Arab Emirates) Hamad Al Merri | (United Arab Emirates) Al Dhafra | Loan | Summer | Undisclosed | |
| 16 June 2012 | DF | 70 | (United Arab Emirates) Bandar Al-Ahbabi | (United Arab Emirates) Al Dhafra | Loan | Summer | Undisclosed | |
| 16 June 2012 | MF | 31 | (United Arab Emirates) Haddaf Al Ameri | (United Arab Emirates) Al Dhafra | Loan | Summer | Undisclosed | |
| 16 June 2012 | FW | — | (United Arab Emirates) Hamad Raqea | (United Arab Emirates) Al Dhafra | Loan | Summer | Undisclosed | |
| 29 June 2012 | MF | — | (United Arab Emirates) Saif Mohammed | (United Arab Emirates) Al Dhafra | Loan | Summer | Undisclosed | |
| 1 August 2012 | FW | 32 | (Argentina) Ignacio Scocco | (Argentina) Newell's Old Boys | Loan | Summer | €1.300,000 | |
| 23 August 2012 | GK | 55 | (United Arab Emirates) Yousif Al Bairaq | (United Arab Emirates) Al Shaab | Loan | Summer | Undisclosed | |
| 13 September 2012 | MF | — | (United Arab Emirates) Rami Yaslam | (United Arab Emirates) Dubai | Loan | Summer | Undisclosed | |
| 20 September 2012 | FW | — | (Ivory Coast) Jumaa Saeed | (Oman) Al Nahda | Loan | Summer | Undisclosed | |
| 23 January 2013 | FW | 45 | (United Arab Emirates) Mohamed Naser | (United Arab Emirates) Al Wasl | Transfer | Winter | Undisclosed | |
| 4 February 2013 | FW | 29 | (United Arab Emirates) Mohamed Malallah | (United Arab Emirates) Ittihad Kalba | Loan | Winter | Undisclosed | |

== Pre-season and friendlies ==
Win Draw Loss Fixtures

| 15 July 2012 Friendly | Krasnodar (Russia) | 3–0 | (United Arab Emirates) Al Ain | Leogang |
| | Golyshev 55'; Lambarschi 71'; Picușceac 89' | Report | | Referee: Hill Hannes |

| 18 July 2012 Friendly | Energie Cottbus (Germany) | 1–1 | (United Arab Emirates) Al Ain | Tirol |
| 17:00 | Glasner 51' | Report | A. Fayez 65' | Stadium: Angerberg; Attendance: 100; Referee: Issen Steen |

| 26 July 2012 Friendly | Al Ain (United Arab Emirates) | 2–0 | (United Arab Emirates) Higher Education | Al Ain |
| 17:00 | Al-Rami 41' (o.g.); A. Sahel 60' | Report | | Stadium: Khalifa bin Zayed; Referee: Abdullah Naji |

| 2 August 2012 Friendly | Al Ain (United Arab Emirates) | 5–0 | (United Arab Emirates) Al Shaab | Al Ain |
| | Gyan 32', 44'; M. Malallah 46'; M. Naser 84' (pen.); J. Saeed 94' | Report | | Stadium: Tahnoun bin Mohammed; Referee: Sultan Abdulrazzaq |

| 9 August 2012 Al Ain Football International Championship | Al Ain (United Arab Emirates) | 2–1 | (Oman) Al Orouba | Al Ain |
| 22:30 GMT+4 (UAE Time) | Gyan 47', 63' | Report | Katkout 34' | Stadium: Khalifa bin Zayed; Referee: Sultan Abdulrazzaq |

| 12 August 2012 Al Ain Football International Championship | Al Ain (United Arab Emirates) | 4–0 | (Kuwait) Al Salmiya | Al Ain |
| 22:30 GMT+4 (UAE Time) | Gyan 19'; A. Fayez 25'; M. Naser 47'; J. Saeed 74' | Report | | Stadium: Khalifa bin Zayed; Referee: Hamad Al Shaikh |

| 15 August 2012 Al Ain Football International Championship | Al Ain (United Arab Emirates) | 1–1 | (Saudi Arabia) Al Shabab | Al Ain |
| 23:30 GMT+4 (UAE Time) | M. Naser 7' | Report | Tagliabué 59' | Stadium: Khalifa bin Zayed; Referee: Mohammed Abdulkarim |

| 28 August 2012 Friendly | Getafe (Spain) | 1–2 | (United Arab Emirates) Al Ain | Getafe |
| | León 7' | Report | Rădoi 85' (pen.); A. Fayez 86' | Stadium: Alfonso Pérez; Referee: García Valencia |

| 29 August 2012 Trofeo Vallecas | Rayo Vallecano (Spain) | 1–2 | (United Arab Emirates) Al Ain | Madrid |
| | Quero 7' | Report | I. Ahmed 8'; A. Fayez 31' | Stadium: Vallecas; Attendance: 12,000; Referee: Jose Luis Lopez |

| 4 September 2012 Friendly | Atlético Madrid (Spain) | 1–0 | (United Arab Emirates) Al Ain | Madrid |
| | Costa 7' | Report | | Stadium: Vicente Calderón; Attendance: 15,000; Referee: Carlos Sánchez |

| 10 September 2012 Friendly | Al Ain (United Arab Emirates) | 0–0 | (Oman) Al Shabab | Al Ain |
| | | Report | | Stadium: Tahnoun bin Mohammed; Referee: Abdullah Naji |

== Competitions ==
=== Overview ===
| Competition | First match | Last match | Starting round | Final position | Record | | | | | | | |
| Competition | First match | Last match | Starting round | Final position | Pld | W | D | L | GF | GA | GD | Win % |
|---|---|---|---|---|---|---|---|---|---|---|---|---|
| Pro League | 23 September 2012 | 24 May 2013 | Matchday 1 | Winners | 26 | 20 | 2 | 4 | 74 | 26 | +48 | 76.92 |
| League Cup | 9 October 2012 | 17 March 2013 | Group stage | Group stage | 8 | 5 | 3 | 0 | 13 | 5 | +8 | 62.50 |
| President's Cup | 20 December 2012 | 5 May 2013 | Round of 16 | Semi-finals | 3 | 2 | 0 | 1 | 7 | 3 | +4 | 66.67 |
| Super Cup | 17 September 2012 | | Final | Winners | 1 | 1 | 0 | 0 | 0 | 0 | +0 | 100.00 |
| Champions League | 27 February 2013 | 30 April 2013 | Group stage | Group stage | 6 | 2 | 0 | 4 | 6 | 9 | −3 | 33.33 |
| Total | | | | | 44 | 30 | 5 | 9 | 100 | 43 | +57 | 68.18 |

Last updated: 24 May 2013
Source: Competitions

=== UAE Pro-League ===
==== League table ====
| Pos | Team | Pld | W | D | L | GF | GA | GD | Pts | Qualification or relegation |
|---|---|---|---|---|---|---|---|---|---|---|
| 1 | Al Ain (C) | 26 | 20 | 2 | 4 | 74 | 26 | +48 | 62 | Qualification to the 2014 AFC Champions League Group Stage |
| 2 | Al Ahli | 26 | 15 | 6 | 5 | 62 | 33 | +29 | 51 | Qualification to the 2014 AFC Champions League Group Stage |
| 3 | Al Jazira | 26 | 13 | 8 | 5 | 56 | 37 | +19 | 47 | Qualification to the 2014 AFC Champions League Group Stage |
| 4 | Baniyas | 26 | 14 | 5 | 7 | 50 | 37 | +13 | 47 | Qualification to the 2014 AFC Champions League Second Qualifying Round |
| 5 | Al Shabab | 26 | 13 | 3 | 10 | 48 | 39 | +9 | 42 | Qualification to the 2014 GCC Champions League |

Source: Full Standings
Rules for classification: 1) points; 2) goal difference; 3) number of goals scored.
(C) Champions

==== Results summary ====
| Overall | | | | | | | | Home | | | | | | Away | | | | | |
| Pld | W | D | L | GF | GA | GD | Pts | W | D | L | GF | GA | GD | W | D | L | GF | GA | GD |
|---|---|---|---|---|---|---|---|---|---|---|---|---|---|---|---|---|---|---|---|
| 26 | 20 | 2 | 4 | 74 | 26 | +48 | 62 | 10 | 1 | 2 | 39 | 13 | +26 | 10 | 1 | 2 | 35 | 13 | +22 |

Last updated: 24 May 2013.
Source: Competitive matches

==== Results by round ====
| Round | 1 | 2 | 3 | 4 | 5 | 6 | 7 | 8 | 9 | 10 | 11 | 12 | 13 | 14 | 15 | 16 | 17 | 18 | 19 | 20 | 21 | 22 | 23 | 24 | 25 | 26 |
|---|---|---|---|---|---|---|---|---|---|---|---|---|---|---|---|---|---|---|---|---|---|---|---|---|---|---|
| Ground | H | A | H | A | A | H | A | H | A | H | A | H | A | A | H | A | H | H | A | H | A | H | A | H | A | H |
| Result | L | W | W | W | D | W | W | W | W | W | W | W | W | W | W | W | L | W | W | W | W | W | L | D | L | W |
| Position | 12 | 9 | 2 | 2 | 3 | 2 | 1 | 1 | 1 | 1 | 1 | 1 | 1 | 1 | 1 | 1 | 1 | 1 | 1 | 1 | 1 | 1 | 1 | 1 | 1 | 1 |

Updated to match(es) played on 24 May 2013. Source: Competitive matches
A = Away; H = Home; W = Win; D = Draw; L = Loss

==== Matches ====
| 23 September 2012 1 | Al Ain | 3–6 | Al Ahli | Al-Ain |
| 20:15 GMT+4 (UAE Time) | D. Sulaiman (yellow card) 17'; I. Ahmed (yellow card) 29'; M. Abdulrahman (yellow card) 36'; Kembo 38'; Gyan 11', 71'; H. Saeed (yellow card) 83'; Rădoi (red card) 85' | Report | Grafite 18', 52', 65', 81' (yellow card) 76'; B. Saeed 50' (yellow card) 70'; Sanqour (yellow card) 53'; Jiménez 83' | Stadium: Tahnoun bin Mohammed Stadium; Attendance: 5,178; Referee: Yaqoub Al Hammadi; Assistant referees: Saleh Mohamed Al Marzouqi, Masoud Hassan; Fourth official: Bader Abdullah |

| 28 September 2012 2 | Ajman | 1–4 | Al Ain | Ajman |
| 17:25 GMT+4 (UAE Time) | Sy 18' | Report | Gyan 5', 11'; F. Fayez 43'; M. Abdulrahman 48'; Al Hosani (yellow card) 58' | Stadium: Rashid Bin Saeed Stadium; Attendance: 5,422; Referee: Fahad Al Kassar; Assistant referees: Mohamed Abdullah Jassim, Omar Sulaiman Al Adab; Fourth official: Ibrahim Al Muhairi |

| 5 October 2012 3 | Al Ain | 7–0 | Al Dhafra | Al-Ain |
| 17:10 GMT+4 (UAE Time) | Gyan 4', 19', 51'; M. Abdulrahman 48', 90+2'; O. Abdulrahman 50'; Brosque 68' | Report | A. Jumaa (yellow card) 3'; M. Awad (yellow card) 27'; M. Qassim (red card) 47' | Stadium: Tahnoun bin Mohammed Stadium; Attendance: 4,421; Referee: Mohamed Abdullah Hassan Mohamed; Assistant referees: Masoud Hassan, Ahmed Al Hossani; Fourth official: Fahad Al Hawasin |

| 21 October 2012 4 | Dibba Al Fujairah | 1–5 | Al Ain | Al-Ain |
| 18:30 GMT+4 (UAE Time) | Al-Naqbi (yellow card) 51'; Murad (yellow card) 68'; Alex 76'; Júnior (red card) 83' | Report | Kembo 6'; F. Jumaa (yellow card) 26'; Gyan 38', 42'; Brosque 41', 67'; Al-Dhahri (red card) 75' | Stadium: Khalifa bin Zayed Stadium; Attendance: 1,730; Referee: Adel Al Naqbi; Assistant referees: Jasem Abdullah Al Ali, Abdulsattar Sanqoor; Fourth official: Yaseen Al Mansory |

| 29 October 2012 5 | Al Jazira | 2–2 | Al Ain | Abu Dhabi |
| 21:00 GMT+4 (UAE Time) | Hyung-min (yellow card) 33'; S. Masoud (yellow card) 44'; A. Mousa 59' (yellow card) 72'; K. Esmaeel (yellow card) 65'; R. Oliveira 74'; Diaky (yellow card) 79' | Report | Gyan 45+1'; Kembo 50'; O. Abdulrahman (yellow card) 75'; M. Ahmed (yellow card) 87' | Stadium: Mohammed bin Zayed Stadium; Attendance: 19,756; Referee: Ali Hamad Albadwawi; Assistant referees: Mohamed Al Jalaf Al Mehairi, Masoud Hassan; Fourth official: Ibrahim Al Muhairi |

| 3 November 2012 6 | Al Ain | 5–0 | Al Wasl | Al-Ain |
| 20:00 GMT+4 (UAE Time) | O. Abdulrahman 21'; H. Saeed (yellow card) 24'; Brosque 45+1'; Gyan 57', 74'; M. Abdulrahman (yellow card) 85' | Report | R. Eisa (yellow card) 42'; S.Saeed (yellow card) 55'; Shikabala (yellow card) 56'; Neill (yellow card) 75' | Stadium: Tahnoun bin Mohammed Stadium; Attendance: 7,035; Referee: Mohamed Abdullah Hassan Mohamed; Assistant referees: Saleh Mohamed Al Marzouqi, Jasem Abdullah Al Ali; Fourth official: Yaseen Al Mansory |

| 8 November 2012 7 | Al Shabab | 2–3 | Al Ain | Dubai |
| 20:00 GMT+4 (UAE Time) | Marzooq (yellow card) 36'; Ciel 54', 90+3' (yellow card) 87'; Edgar (yellow card) 76' | Report | Gyan 43', 64'; Kembo (yellow card) 45+3'; H. Saeed (yellow card) 60'; M. Ahmed (yellow card) 69'; I. Ahmed 75'; Rădoi (yellow card) 83'; K. Abdulrahman (yellow card) 90+2'; D. Sulaiman (yellow card) 90+4' | Stadium: Maktoum bin Rashid Stadium; Attendance: 1,830; Referee: Abdulwahid Qhater; Assistant referees: Hasan Al Mahri, Masoud Hassan; Fourth official: Yaseen Al Mansory |

| 18 November 2012 8 | Al Ain | 6–0 | Ittihad Kalba | Al-Ain |
| 16:45 GMT+4 (UAE Time) | M. Ahmed 43', 55'; O. Abdulrahman 45', 53'; Gyan 65'; Kembo 78'; Brosque (yellow card) 85' | Report | Jahouh (yellow card) 27'; S.Saeed (yellow card) 41'; J. Musabeh (yellow card) 44'; S. Faraj (yellow card) 62'; N. Mohamed (yellow card) 85' | Stadium: Tahnoun bin Mohammed Stadium; Attendance: 1,263; Referee: Yaseen Al Mansory; Assistant referees: Mohamed Abdullah Jassem, Sabet Al Ali; Fourth official: Rashid Abdulkarim |

| 23 November 2012 9 | Dubai | 2–5 | Al Ain | Dubai |
| 16:45 GMT+4 (UAE Time) | A. Hassan (yellow card) 31'; Keita (yellow card) 68'; Porta (yellow card) 84'; Y. Al Hammadi (yellow card) 85' | Report | Gyan 3', 67'; Brosque 15'; O. Abdulrahman 33', 43' (yellow card) 33' | Stadium: Dubai Club Stadium; Attendance: 2,450; Referee: Abdullah Al Aajel; Assistant referees: Mohamed Ahmed Al Hammadi, Abdulsattar Sanqoor; Fourth official: Ahmed Sulaiman Jemei |

| 30 November 2012 10 | Al Ain | 2–1 | Al Shaab | Al-Ain |
| 20:00 GMT+4 (UAE Time) | Gyan 14'; M. Salem (yellow card) 35'; I. Ahmed (yellow card) 47'; Al-Wehaibi 60' | Report | S. Abbas (yellow card) 17'; Bu Safared (yellow card) 29'; Careca (yellow card) 82' | Stadium: Tahnoun bin Mohammed Stadium; Attendance: 7,802; Referee: Ali Hamad Albadwawi; Assistant referees: Hasan Almahri, Ebrahim Al Mansory; Fourth official: Yaseen Al Mansory |

| 5 December 2012 11 | Baniyas | 0–3 | Al Ain | Abu Dhabi |
| 20:00 GMT+4 (UAE Time) | Zidan (yellow card) 52'; Nawaf .M (yellow card) 63'; M. Jaber (yellow card) 72' | Report | Kembo 9'; Brosque 47' (yellow card) 75'; Gyan 90+1' | Stadium: Baniyas Stadium; Attendance: 7,242; Referee: Hamad Al Shaikh; Assistant referees: Mohamed Al Jalaf, Masoud Hassan; Fourth official: Yaqoub Al Hammadi |

| 10 December 2012 12 | Al Ain | 2–1 | Al Wahda | Al-Ain |
| 20:00 GMT+4 (UAE Time) | Brosque 6'; K. Abdulrahman (yellow card) 17'; I. Ahmed (yellow card) 60'; Gyan 81'; M. Abdulrahman (red card) 90+2' | Report | Santo (yellow card) 21'; Al Mansoori (yellow card) 42'; Al Kathiri (yellow card) 74' | Stadium: Tahnoun bin Mohammed Stadium; Attendance: 6,931; Referee: Ammar Ali Al Junaibi; Assistant referees: Saleh Mohamed Al Marzouqi, Ahmed Saeed Al Rashedi; Fourth official: Abdulla Najee Al Harthi |

| 16 December 2012 13 | Al Nasr | 0–2 | Al Ain | Dubai |
| 20:00 GMT+4 (UAE Time) | Mascara (yellow card) 29' | Report | Kembo 7'; Gyan 37'; M. Ahmed (yellow card) 68'; O. Abdulrahman (yellow card) 90+1'; D. Sulaiman (yellow card) 90+3'; K. Abdulrahman (yellow card) 90+4' | Stadium: Al-Maktoum Stadium; Attendance: 7,340; Referee: Mohamed Abdulkarim; Assistant referees: Mohamed Al Jalaf, Ali Al Nuaimi; Fourth official: Yaqoub Al Hammadi |

| 26 January 2013 15 | Al Ain | 4–0 | Ajman | Al-Ain |
| 17:15 GMT+4 (UAE Time) | Kembo 11' (yellow card) 53'; M. Ahmed (yellow card) 44'; Brosque 64'; O. Abdulrahman 76'; Yousef 87' | Report | Waleed (yellow card) 34'; Shehab (yellow card) 71'; Al Yassi (yellow card) 75' | Stadium: Tahnoun bin Mohammed Stadium; Attendance: 2,807; Referee: Mohamed Abdullah Hassan Mohamed; Assistant referees: Hassan Al Mahri, Mohamed Al Hammadi; Fourth official: Sultan Mohamed Saleh |

| 14 February 2013 16 | Al Dhafra | 0–3 | Al Ain | Abu Dhabi |
| 17:35 GMT+4 (UAE Time) | Abdulrahim (yellow card) 30'; Zahran (yellow card) 40' | Report | I. Ahmed 13'; Al Wehaibi 43'; Rădoi (yellow card) 61'; Brosque 76'; H. Saeed (yellow card) 86'; M. Ahmed (yellow card) 90+1' | Stadium: Hamdan bin Zayed Al Nahyan; Attendance: 1,054; Referee: Fahad Al Kassar; Assistant referees: Hassan Al Mahri, Ebrahim Al Mansory; Fourth official: Abdul Ghafar Besher |

| 21 February 2013 17 | Al Ain | 0–1 | Dibba Al Fujairah | Al-Ain |
| 17:30 GMT+4 (UAE Time) | | Report | Fernandinho 33'; Ocran (yellow card) 50'; Malallah (yellow card) 65'; Al Rowaihy (yellow card) 83' | Stadium: Tahnoun bin Mohammed Stadium; Attendance: 1,733; Referee: Sultan Abdulrazzaq Al Marzouqi; Assistant referees: Sabet Al Ali, Esshaq Ali Al Hammadi; Fourth official: Abdallah Rashid Al Naqbi |

| 3 March 2013 18 | Al Ain | 1–0 | Al Jazira | Al-Ain |
| 20:15 GMT+4 (UAE Time) | O. Abdulrahman (yellow card) 25'; K. Abdulrahman (yellow card) 61'; Gyan 80'; M. Abdulrahman (yellow card) 90+3' | Report | Oliveira (yellow card) 37'; Delgado (yellow card) 63'; Y. Matar (yellow card) 78'; Juma .A (yellow card) 79'; Khamis .E (yellow card) 86' | Stadium: Tahnoun bin Mohammed Stadium; Attendance: 8,021; Referee: Mohamed Abdullah Hassan Mohamed; Assistant referees: Saleh Mohamed Al Marzouqi, Masoud Hassan; Fourth official: Bader Abdullah |

| 7 March 2013 19 | Al Wasl | 1–2 | Al Ain | Dubai |
| 20:15 GMT+4 (UAE Time) | Emaná 3'; Ahmed .I (yellow card) 30'; Yasser (yellow card) 39'; A. Abbas (yellow card) 41'; Mahir (yellow card) 64'; Mahmoud (yellow card) 72'; Waheed (yellow card) 88' | Report | Gyan 66', 79'; Kembo (yellow card) 16' | Stadium: Za'abeel Stadium; Attendance: 4,708; Referee: Ammar Ali Al Junaibi; Assistant referees: Hassan Al Mahri, Jasem Abdullah Al Ali; Fourth official: Yaqoub Al Hammadi |

| 29 March 2013 20 | Al Ain | 2–1 | Al Shabab | Al-Ain |
| 20:30 GMT+4 (UAE Time) | M. Salem (yellow card) 23'; Yaqoub (yellow card) 68'; Brosque 77'; Yousef 81'; F. Fayez (yellow card) 85' | Report | Henrique 49' (yellow card) 76'; Essa .o (yellow card) 75' (red card) 79'; Hamdan .Q (yellow card) 90+3' | Stadium: Tahnoun bin Mohammed Stadium; Attendance: 4,132; Referee: Ali Hamad Albadwawi; Assistant referees: Mohamed Ahmed Al Hammadi, Saeed Sreh Yammahi; Fourth official: Adel Al Naqbi |

| 6 April 2013 14 | Al Ahli | 0–3 | Al Ain | Dubai |
| 17:50 GMT+4 (UAE Time) | B. Saeed (yellow card) 11'; Grafite (yellow card) 46'; Y. Mohamad (yellow card) 71'; Al Hammadi (yellow card) 89' | Report | Al-Dhahri (yellow card) 30' | Stadium: Rashid Stadium; Attendance: 6,290; Referee: Hamad Al Shaikh; Assistant referees: Saleh Mohamed Al Marzouqi, Mohamed Al Jalaf; Fourth official: Yaqoub Al Hammadi |
Note: Called off at the end of the match after an assistant referee Mohamed Al Jalaf was hit by a metal object thrown from Al Ahli crowd. Al Ain have been awarded a 3-0 victory by the Football Association's Disciplinary Committee.

| 14 April 2013 21 | Ittihad Kalba | 1–3 | Al Ain | Kalba |
| 17:50 GMT+4 (UAE Time) | Dufrennes (yellow card) 18'; Faraj 38'; S. Saif (red card) 72'; Al-Mansoori (yellow card) 74'; Abdulazeiz (yellow card) 89' | Report | Rădoi 6', 47'; Gyan 90+1' | Stadium: Ittihad Kalba Stadium; Attendance: 850; Referee: Mohamed Abdulkarim Al Zarouni; Assistant referees: Hassan Al Mahri, Zayed Dawood Kamal; Fourth official: Abdulwahid Qhater |

| 18 April 2013 22 | Al Ain | 3–0 | Dubai | Al-Ain |
| 19:25 GMT+4 (UAE Time) | Gyan 37', 56', 75'; Yaqoub (yellow card) 90'; M. Salem (yellow card) 90+2' | Report | I. Ahmed (yellow card) 12'; Magrão (yellow card) 19' | Stadium: Tahnoun bin Mohammed Stadium; Attendance: 6,216; Referee: Abdullah Ali Al Aajel; Assistant referees: Masoud Hassan, Khamis Fairooz Obid; Fourth official: Abdulla Najee Al Harthi |

| 27 April 2013 23 | Al Shaab | 1–0 | Al Ain | Sharjah |
| 18:00 GMT+4 (UAE Time) | Al-Junaibi (yellow card) 44'; N'dri 79' | Report | | Stadium: Khalid bin Mohammed Stadium; Attendance: 1,856; Referee: Mohamed Abdullah Hassan Mohamed; Assistant referees: Mohamed Ahmed Al Hammadi, Zayed Dawood Kamal; Fourth official: Abdullah Eshtairy |

| 12 May 2013 24 | Al Ain | 2–2 | Baniyas | Al-Ain |
| 18:10 GMT+4 (UAE Time) | Gyan 23', 65' (yellow card) 32'; Al-Dhahri (red card) 33'; Al Nasseri (yellow card) 90+3'; Kembo (yellow card) 90+4' | Report | Y. Jaber (yellow card) 44'; Senghor 74', 86' | Stadium: Tahnoun bin Mohammed Stadium; Attendance: 1,074; Referee: Abdullah Ali Al Aajel; Assistant referees: Mohamed Al Jalaf, Sabet Al Ali; Fourth official: Sultan Abdulrazzaq Al Marzouqi |

| 18 May 2013 25 | Al Wahda | 2–0 | Al Ain | Abu Dhabi |
| 19:40 GMT+4 (UAE Time) | Salem 42'; Waigo 75'; Al-Hosani (yellow card) 83' | Report | Rădoi (yellow card) 58' | Stadium: Al Nahyan Stadium; Attendance: 3,855; Referee: Fahad Al Kassar; Assistant referees: Masoud Hassan, Abdulsattar Sanqoor; Fourth official: Yaseen Al Mansory |

| 24 May 2013 26 | Al Ain | 2–1 | Al Nasr | Al-Ain |
| 18:15 GMT+4 (UAE Time) | Kembo 67' (yellow card) 73'; Gyan 88' | Report | Correa 9' (yellow card) 89'; Humaid (yellow card) 36'; Ghazi (yellow card) 72'; Mascara (red card) 88' | Stadium: Tahnoun bin Mohammed Stadium; Attendance: 5,852; Referee: Abdulwahid Qhater; Assistant referees: Ahmed Saeed Al Rashedi, Saeed Sreh Yammahi; Fourth official: Abdulla Najee Al Harthi |

=== Super Cup ===
| 17 September 2012 Final | Al Ain | 0–0 (a.e.t.) (5–4 p) | Al Jazira | Dubai |
| 19:05 GMT+4 (UAE Time) | K. Abdulrahman (yellow card) 68'; M. Ahmed (yellow card) 88' | Report | K. Esmaeel (yellow card) 21'; Hyung-min (yellow card) 66'; Bargash (yellow card) 85' | Stadium: Zabeel Stadium; Attendance: 8,274; Referee: Ali Hamad Albadwawi; Assistant referees: Mohamed Ahmed Al Hammadi, Jasem Abdullah Al Ali; Fourth official: Abdulwahid Qhater |
| | Penalties |
| | Gyan (penalty scored); Kembo (penalty scored); Rădoi (penalty scored); O. Abdulrahman (penalty missed); F. Jumaa (penalty missed); M. Ahmed (penalty scored); M. Abdulrahman (penalty missed); D. Sulaiman (penalty scored) | | (penalty scored) Diaky; (penalty missed) Fernandinho; (penalty scored) Bargash; (penalty scored) R. Oliveira; (penalty missed) A. Mousa; (penalty scored) Y. Matar; (penalty missed) Hyung-min; (penalty missed) S. Masoud |

=== President's Cup ===
| 20 December 2012 Round of 16 | Al Ain | 4–0 | Al Fujairah | Sharjah |
| 19:45 GMT+4 (UAE Time) | Kembo 31', 45'; I. Ahmed (yellow card) 35' (goal) 46' (2H) (substituted off) 60'; M. Fayez (substituted on) 60'; Gyan (substituted off) 70'; Y. Ahmed (substituted on) 70'; Al Saadi 75'; Rădoi (substituted off) 76'; M. Malallah (substituted on) 76' | Report | | Stadium: Sharjah Stadium; Referee: Abdullah Najee |
Note: Lineups

| 10 February 2013 Quarter-finals | Al Ain | 2–1 | Bani Yas | Dubai |
| 17:25 GMT+4 (UAE Time) | Brosque 15'; I. Ahmed (substituted off) 56'; M. Salem (substituted on) 56'; Al-Wehaibi 77'; Kembo (substituted off) 89'; M. Abdulrahman (substituted on) 89'; H. Saeed (substituted off) 92'; Al Hosani (substituted on) 92' | Report | Y. Jaber (yellow card) 63'; Senghor (yellow card) 63'; N. Mubarak (substituted off) 65'; H. Saleh (substituted on) 65'; Aboutrika 68' | Stadium: Zabeel Stadium; Referee: Ammar Al Junaibi |
Note: Lineups

| 5 May 2013 Semi-finals | Al Ain | 1–2 | Al Ahli | Al Nahyan Stadium |
| 18:10 GMT+4 (UAE Time) | M. Ahmed (yellow card) 24' (red card) 58'; I. Ahmed (yellow card) 29'; F. Jumaa (yellow card) 30' (substituted off) 45'; Al-Dhahri (substituted on) 45'; Gyan (yellow card) 47'; Kembo (substituted off) 62'; Al-Wehaibi (substituted on) 62'; H. Saeed (substituted off) 73'; M. Abdulrahman (substituted on) 73'; Brosque 82' (yellow card) 84'; Mahmoud Al Mas (yellow card) 93'; O. Abdulrahman (yellow card) 96' (red card) 96' | Report | Grafite 16'; B. Saeed 35'; M.Naser (yellow card) 84'; Haikal (yellow card) 84' | Attendance: Abu Dhabi; Referee: Ammar Al Junaibi |
Note: Lineups

=== Group stage ===
==== Group A ====
| Pos | Team | Pld | W | D | L | GF | GA | GD | Pts |
|---|---|---|---|---|---|---|---|---|---|
| 1 | Al-Wahda | 8 | 6 | 1 | 1 | 18 | 7 | +11 | 19 |
| 2 | Al Ain | 8 | 5 | 3 | 0 | 13 | 5 | +8 | 18 |
| 3 | Al Nasr | 8 | 2 | 3 | 3 | 13 | 10 | +3 | 9 |
| 4 | Dubai | 8 | 2 | 1 | 5 | 11 | 16 | −5 | 7 |
| 5 | Al-Shaab | 8 | 0 | 2 | 6 | 6 | 23 | −17 | 2 |

Updated to match(es) played on 17 March 2013. Source: Soccerway
Rules for classification: 1) points; 2) goal difference; 3) number of goals scored.

| 9 October 2012 1 | Dubai | 2–4 | Al Ain | Dubai |
| 17:10 GMT+4 (UAE Time) | Porta 24'; M. Ismael (yellow card) 63'; Feindouno 87' | Report | Brosque 13', 53', 65'; Al Shamisi (yellow card) 41'; M. Abdulrahman 74'; M. Fayez (yellow card) 89' | Stadium: Police Officers Club; Attendance: 850; Referee: Sultan Abdulrazzaq Al Marzouqi |

| 14 October 2012 2 | Al Ain | 0–0 | Al Wahda | Al Ain |
| 20:00 GMT+4 (UAE Time) | I. Ahmed (yellow card) 35' | Report | | Stadium: Tahnoun bin Mohammed; Attendance: 2,419; Referee: Ali Hamad Al Badwawi |

| 13 November 2012 3 | Al Nasr | 0–0 | Al Ain | Dubai |
| 20:00 GMT+4 (UAE Time) | | Report | Al Saadi (yellow card) 11'; Al Hosani (yellow card) 54'; Al Dhahri (yellow card) 68' | Stadium: Maktoum bin Rashid Al Maktoum; Attendance: 1,281; Referee: Abdullah Al Aajel |

| 28 December 2012 4 | Al Ain | 2–0 | Al-Shaab | Al Ain |
| 16:50 GMT+4 (UAE Time) | Al Shamisi 21'; F. Jumaa (yellow card) 55'; Y. Ahmed 80'; Al Saadi (yellow card) 82' | Report | Careca (yellow card) 55' | Stadium: Tahnoun bin Mohammed; Attendance: 1,211; Referee: Ibrahim Al Muhairi |

| 10 January 2013 5 | Al Ain | 2–1 | Dubai | Al Ain |
| 17:00 GMT+4 (UAE Time) | Al Saadi 2', 78'; Rădoi (yellow card) 15'; F. Fayez (yellow card) 90+3' | Report | A. Hassan (yellow card) 18'; M. Ismael (yellow card) 38'; Juca (yellow card) 51'; Y. Al Hammadi (red card) 72'; R. Yaslam 85'; M. Lashkari (yellow card) 86' | Stadium: Tahnoun bin Mohammed; Attendance: 502; Referee: Eisa Khalifa Al Hajri |

| 17 January 2013 6 | Al-Wahda | 0–1 | Al Ain | Abu Dhabi |
| 20:00 GMT+4 (UAE Time) | Basulaiman (yellow card) 61'; Tawfeeq (yellow card) 88' | Report | Kembo 45'; I. Ahmed (yellow card) 66'; H. Saeed (yellow card) 92' | Stadium: Al Nahyan; Attendance: 563; Referee: Fahad Al Kassar |

| 1 February 2013 7 | Al Ain | 1–1 | Al Nasr | Al Ain |
| 17:20 GMT+4 (UAE Time) | Rădoi (yellow card) 44'; Kembo 79'; A. Malallah (yellow card) 90' | Report | Al Ajmani (yellow card) 49'; Lima 90+1'; Mascara (yellow card) 90+2' | Stadium: Tahnoun bin Mohammed; Attendance: 2,043; Referee: Hamad Ali Yousef |

| 17 March 2013 8 | Al-Shaab | 1–3 | Al Ain | Sharjah |
| 17:45 GMT+4 (UAE Time) | Kaseke 32'; K. Saqar (yellow card) 59'; J. Sanqoor (yellow card) 61' | Report | A. Malallah 43'; Y. Ahmed 29', 73' | Stadium: Khalid bin Mohammed; Attendance: 923; Referee: Adel Al Naqbi |

=== Group stage ===
==== Group D ====
| Pos | Team | Pld | W | D | L | GF | GA | GD | Pts | Qualification | EST | HIL | AIN | RAY |
|---|---|---|---|---|---|---|---|---|---|---|---|---|---|---|
| 1 | (Iran) Esteghlal | 6 | 4 | 1 | 1 | 11 | 5 | +6 | 13 | Advance to knockout stage | — | 0–1 | 2–0 | 3–0 |
| 2 | (Saudi Arabia) Al-Hilal | 6 | 4 | 0 | 2 | 10 | 6 | +4 | 12 | Advance to knockout stage | 1–2 | — | 2–0 | 3–1 |
| 3 | (United Arab Emirates) Al-Ain | 6 | 2 | 0 | 4 | 6 | 9 | −3 | 6 | | 0–1 | 3–1 | — | 2–1 |
| 4 | (Qatar) Al-Rayyan | 6 | 1 | 1 | 4 | 7 | 14 | −7 | 4 | | 3–3 | 0–2 | 2–1 | — |

Source: ScoresPro

| 27 February 2013 | Al-Ain (United Arab Emirates) | 3–1 | (Saudi Arabia) Al-Hilal | Tahnoun bin Mohammed Stadium, Al Ain |
| 19:15 UTC+4 | Abdulrahman 27'; Brosque 46'; Gyan 90+2' | Report | Al-Zori 9' | Attendance: 8,819; Referee: Peter Green (Australia) |

| 13 March 2013 | Esteghlal (Iran) | 2–0 | (United Arab Emirates) Al-Ain | Azadi Stadium, Tehran |
| 19:00 UTC+3:30 | Samuel 64'; Majidi 73' | Report | | Attendance: 21,330; Referee: Valentin Kovalenko (Uzbekistan) |

| 3 April 2013 | Al-Ain (United Arab Emirates) | 2–1 | (Qatar) Al-Rayyan | Tahnoun bin Mohammed Stadium, Al Ain |
| 19:30 UTC+4 | Ekoko 34'; Brosque 70' | Report | Nilmar 32' | Attendance: 8,102; Referee: Ryuji Sato (Japan) |

| 9 April 2013 | Al-Rayyan (Qatar) | 2–1 | (United Arab Emirates) Al-Ain | Ahmed bin Ali Stadium, Al Rayyan |
| 18:40 UTC+3 | Nilmar 59'; Al-Marri 86' | Report | Ahmed 78' | Attendance: 2,000; Referee: Kim Jong-Hyeok (South Korea) |

| 23 April 2013 | Al-Hilal (Saudi Arabia) | 2–0 | (United Arab Emirates) Al-Ain | Prince Faisal bin Fahd Stadium, Riyadh |
| 20:50 UTC+3 | Al-Dossari 4'; Wesley 24' | Report | | Attendance: 13,067; Referee: Vladislav Tseytlin (Uzbekistan) |

| 30 April 2013 | Al-Ain (United Arab Emirates) | 0–1 | (Iran) Esteghlal | Tahnoun bin Mohammed Stadium, Al Ain |
| 19:50 UTC+4 | | Report | Nekounam 80' (pen.) | Attendance: 4,173; Referee: Masaaki Toma (Japan) |

== Statistics ==
=== Squad appearances and goals ===
Last updated on 24 May 2013.

| No. | Pos | Nat | Player | Total | | Pro-League | | President's Cup | | League Cup | | Super Cup | | Champions League | |
| No. | Pos | Nat | Player | Apps | Goals | Apps | Goals | Apps | Goals | Apps | Goals | Apps | Goals | Apps | Goals |
Goalkeepers
| 22 | GK | (United Arab Emirates) UAE | Mahmoud Al Mas | 12 | 0 | 4 | 0 | 1 | 0 | 4 | 0 | 0 | 0 | 3 | 0 |
| 30 | GK | (United Arab Emirates) UAE | Abdullah Sultan | 7 | 0 | 3 | 0 | 0 | 0 | 4 | 0 | 0 | 0 | 0 | 0 |
| 36 | GK | (United Arab Emirates) UAE | Dawoud Sulaiman | 25 | 0 | 19 | 0 | 2 | 0 | 0 | 0 | 1 | 0 | 3 | 0 |
Defenders
| 4 | DF | (United Arab Emirates) UAE | Musallem Fayez | 9 | 0 | 3 | 0 | 1 | 0 | 5 | 0 | 0 | 0 | 0 | 0 |
| 5 | DF | (United Arab Emirates) UAE | Ismail Ahmed | 32 | 4 | 21 | 3 | 3 | 1 | 3 | 0 | 0 | 0 | 5 | 0 |
| 14 | DF | (United Arab Emirates) UAE | Mohammed Fayez | 4 | 0 | 1 | 0 | 1 | 0 | 2 | 0 | 0 | 0 | 0 | 0 |
| 15 | DF | (United Arab Emirates) UAE | Khaled Abdulrahman | 30 | 0 | 20 | 0 | 1 | 0 | 6 | 0 | 1 | 0 | 2 | 0 |
| 17 | DF | (United Arab Emirates) UAE | Mohammed Ayed | 2 | 0 | 1 | 0 | 0 | 0 | 1 | 0 | 0 | 0 | 0 | 0 |
| 19 | DF | (United Arab Emirates) UAE | Mohanad Salem | 30 | 0 | 20 | 0 | 3 | 0 | 1 | 0 | 1 | 0 | 5 | 0 |
| 21 | DF | (United Arab Emirates) UAE | Fawzi Fayez | 26 | 1 | 15 | 1 | 1 | 0 | 6 | 0 | 0 | 0 | 4 | 0 |
| 23 | DF | (United Arab Emirates) UAE | Mohamed Ahmed | 30 | 2 | 21 | 2 | 2 | 0 | 0 | 0 | 1 | 0 | 6 | 0 |
| 26 | DF | (United Arab Emirates) UAE | Abdulsalam Mohammed | 4 | 0 | 3 | 0 | 0 | 0 | 1 | 0 | 0 | 0 | 0 | 0 |
| 31 | DF | (United Arab Emirates) UAE | Fahed Juma | 1 | 0 | 0 | 0 | 0 | 0 | 1 | 0 | 0 | 0 | 0 | 0 |
| 33 | DF | (United Arab Emirates) UAE | Mohammed Al-Dhahri | 19 | 0 | 9 | 0 | 1 | 0 | 7 | 0 | 0 | 0 | 2 | 0 |
| 43 | DF | (United Arab Emirates) UAE | Salem Sultan | 1 | 0 | 0 | 0 | 0 | 0 | 1 | 0 | 0 | 0 | 0 | 0 |
| 44 | DF | (United Arab Emirates) UAE | Fares Jumaa | 30 | 0 | 15 | 0 | 2 | 0 | 7 | 0 | 1 | 0 | 5 | 0 |
| 60 | DF | (United Arab Emirates) UAE | Saeed Musabbeh | 1 | 0 | 0 | 0 | 0 | 0 | 1 | 0 | 0 | 0 | 0 | 0 |
Midfielders
| 2 | MF | (United Arab Emirates) UAE | Yaqoub Al Hosani | 23 | 0 | 12 | 0 | 2 | 0 | 6 | 0 | 1 | 0 | 2 | 0 |
| 6 | MF | (Romania) ROU | Mirel Rădoi | 35 | 2 | 20 | 2 | 3 | 0 | 5 | 0 | 1 | 0 | 6 | 0 |
| 7 | MF | (United Arab Emirates) UAE | Ali Al-Wehaibi | 32 | 3 | 19 | 2 | 3 | 1 | 6 | 0 | 0 | 0 | 4 | 0 |
| 8 | MF | (United Arab Emirates) UAE | Mohammed Al Saadi | 13 | 3 | 5 | 0 | 1 | 1 | 7 | 2 | 0 | 0 | 0 | 0 |
| 10 | MF | (United Arab Emirates) UAE | Omar Abdulrahman | 31 | 8 | 22 | 7 | 2 | 0 | 0 | 0 | 1 | 0 | 6 | 1 |
| 18 | MF | (United Arab Emirates) UAE | Abdullah Malallah | 6 | 1 | 2 | 0 | 0 | 0 | 4 | 1 | 0 | 0 | 0 | 0 |
| 20 | MF | (United Arab Emirates) UAE | Helal Saeed | 30 | 0 | 19 | 0 | 2 | 0 | 3 | 0 | 1 | 0 | 5 | 0 |
| 25 | MF | (United Arab Emirates) UAE | Ahmed Al Shamisi | 9 | 1 | 7 | 0 | 0 | 0 | 2 | 1 | 0 | 0 | 0 | 0 |
| 27 | MF | (United Arab Emirates) UAE | Salem Abdullah | 1 | 0 | 0 | 0 | 0 | 0 | 1 | 0 | 0 | 0 | 0 | 0 |
| 34 | MF | (United Arab Emirates) UAE | Sultan Nasser | 6 | 0 | 5 | 0 | 0 | 0 | 1 | 0 | 0 | 0 | 0 | 0 |
| 64 | MF | (United Arab Emirates) UAE | Rayan Yaslam | 1 | 0 | 0 | 0 | 0 | 0 | 1 | 0 | 0 | 0 | 0 | 0 |
| 68 | MF | (United Arab Emirates) UAE | Ahmed Barman | 2 | 0 | 0 | 0 | 0 | 0 | 2 | 0 | 0 | 0 | 0 | 0 |
Forwards
| 3 | FW | (Ghana) GHA | Asamoah Gyan | 29 | 32 | 22 | 31 | 2 | 0 | 0 | 0 | 1 | 0 | 4 | 1 |
| 9 | FW | (France) FRA | Kembo Ekoko | 37 | 13 | 23 | 8 | 3 | 2 | 4 | 2 | 1 | 0 | 6 | 1 |
| 11 | FW | (United Arab Emirates) UAE | Abdulaziz Fayez | 3 | 0 | 2 | 0 | 0 | 0 | 0 | 0 | 1 | 0 | 0 | 0 |
| 16 | FW | (United Arab Emirates) UAE | Mohamed Abdulrahman | 36 | 4 | 22 | 3 | 2 | 0 | 5 | 1 | 1 | 0 | 6 | 0 |
| 28 | FW | (United Arab Emirates) UAE | Abdullah Al Sheeba | 1 | 0 | 0 | 0 | 0 | 0 | 1 | 0 | 0 | 0 | 0 | 0 |
| 32 | FW | (Australia) AUS | Alex Brosque | 32 | 17 | 20 | 10 | 2 | 2 | 4 | 3 | 0 | 0 | 6 | 2 |
| 37 | FW | (United Arab Emirates) UAE | Faraj Juma | 2 | 0 | 2 | 0 | 0 | 0 | 0 | 0 | 0 | 0 | 0 | 0 |
| 65 | FW | (United Arab Emirates) UAE | Yousef Ahmed | 13 | 6 | 6 | 2 | 1 | 0 | 3 | 3 | 0 | 0 | 3 | 1 |
Players who have made an appearance this season but have left the club
| 29 | FW | (United Arab Emirates) UAE | Mohamed Malallah | 5 | 0 | 0 | 0 | 1 | 0 | 4 | 0 | 0 | 0 | 0 | 0 |
| 45 | FW | (United Arab Emirates) UAE | Mohamed Naser | 3 | 0 | 0 | 0 | 0 | 0 | 3 | 0 | 0 | 0 | 0 | 0 |

=== Clean sheets ===
| Rank | Player | Clean sheets |
|---|---|---|
| 1 | (United Arab Emirates) Dawoud Sulaiman | 8 |
| 2 | (United Arab Emirates) Mahmoud Almas | 5 |
| 3 | (United Arab Emirates) Abdulla Sultan | 3 |
| TOTALS | | 16 |

Last updated: 24 May 2013
Source: Competitive matches

=== Hat-tricks ===
| Player | Against | Result | Date | Competition |
|---|---|---|---|---|
| (Ghana) Asamoah Gyan | (United Arab Emirates) Al Dhafra | 7–0 (H) | 5 October 2012 | Pro-League |
| (Australia) Alex Brosque | (United Arab Emirates) Dubai | 2–4 (A) | 9 October 2012 | League Cup |
| (Ghana) Asamoah Gyan | (United Arab Emirates) Dubai | 3–0 (H) | 18 April 2013 | Pro-League |

(H) – Home; (A) – Away

=== Assists ===
| Rnk | No. | Pos | Player | League | League Cup | President's Cup | Champions League | Super Cup | Total |
|---|---|---|---|---|---|---|---|---|---|
| 1 | 10 | MF | (United Arab Emirates) Omar Abdulrahman | 12 | | | 4 | | 16 |
| 2 | 9 | FW | (France) Kembo Ekoko | 4 | | 3 | | | 7 |
| — | 3 | FW | (Ghana) Asamoah Gyan | 6 | | 1 | | | 7 |
| 4 | 6 | MF | (Romania) Mirel Radoi | 4 | 1 | 1 | | | 6 |
| 5 | 16 | FW | (United Arab Emirates) Mohamed Abdulrahman | 5 | | | | | 5 |
| — | 20 | MF | (United Arab Emirates) Helal Saeed | 5 | | | | | 5 |
| 7 | 32 | FW | (Australia) Alex Brosque | 4 | | | | | 4 |
| — | 15 | DF | (United Arab Emirates) Khaled Abdulrahman | 2 | | | 2 | | 4 |
| 9 | 7 | MF | (United Arab Emirates) Ali Al-Wehaibi | 1 | 1 | 1 | | | 3 |
| 10 | 8 | MF | (United Arab Emirates) Mohammed Al Saadi | | 2 | | | | 2 |
| — | 33 | DF | (United Arab Emirates) Mohammed Al-Dhahri | 2 | | | | | 2 |
| 12 | 23 | DF | (United Arab Emirates) Mohamed Ahmed | 1 | | | | | 1 |
| — | 19 | DF | (United Arab Emirates) Mohanad Salem | | | 1 | | | 1 |
| — | 25 | MF | (United Arab Emirates) Ahmed Al Shamisi | 1 | | | | | 1 |
| — | 65 | FW | (United Arab Emirates) Yousef Ahmed | | 1 | | | | 1 |
| — | 45 | FW | (United Arab Emirates) Mohamed Naser | | 1 | | | | 1 |
| — | 36 | GK | (United Arab Emirates) Dawoud Sulaiman | 1 | | | | | 1 |
| — | 18 | MF | (United Arab Emirates) Abdullah Malallah | | 1 | | | | 1 |
| — | 27 | MF | (United Arab Emirates) Salem Abdullah | | 1 | | | | 1 |
| — | 30 | GK | (United Arab Emirates) Abdulla Sultan | 1 | | | | | 1 |
| — | 34 | MF | (United Arab Emirates) Sultan Al Shamsi | 1 | | | | | 1 |
| TOTALS | | | | 49 | 8 | 7 | 6 | | 70 |

Last updated: 24 May 2013
Source: Competitive matches

=== Goalscorers ===
| Rnk | No. | Pos | Player | League | League Cup | President's Cup | Champions League | Super Cup | Total |
|---|---|---|---|---|---|---|---|---|---|
| 1 | 3 | FW | (Ghana) Asamoah Gyan | 31 | | | 1 | | 32 |
| 2 | 32 | FW | (Australia) Alex Brosque | 10 | 3 | 2 | 2 | | 17 |
| 3 | 9 | FW | (France) Kembo Ekoko | 8 | 2 | 2 | 1 | | 13 |
| 4 | 10 | MF | (United Arab Emirates) Omar Abdulrahman | 7 | | | 1 | | 8 |
| 5 | 65 | FW | (United Arab Emirates) Yousef Ahmed | 2 | 3 | | 1 | | 6 |
| 6 | 5 | DF | (United Arab Emirates) Ismail Ahmed | 3 | | 1 | | | 4 |
| — | 16 | FW | (United Arab Emirates) Mohamed Abdulrahman | 3 | 1 | | | | 4 |
| 8 | 8 | MF | (United Arab Emirates) Mohammed Al Saadi | | 2 | 1 | | | 3 |
| — | 7 | MF | (United Arab Emirates) Ali Al-Wehaibi | 2 | | 1 | | | 3 |
| 10 | 6 | MF | (Romania) Mirel Radoi | 2 | | | | | 2 |
| — | 23 | DF | (United Arab Emirates) Mohamed Ahmed | 2 | | | | | 2 |
| 12 | 21 | DF | (United Arab Emirates) Fawzi Fayez | 1 | | | | | 1 |
| — | 25 | MF | (United Arab Emirates) Ahmed Al Shamisi | | 1 | | | | 1 |
| — | 18 | MF | (United Arab Emirates) Abdullah Malallah | | 1 | | | | 1 |
| Own Goals | | | | | | | | | |
| TOTALS | | | | 71 | 13 | 7 | 6 | | 97 |

Last updated: 24 May 2013
Source: Competitive matches

== Awards ==
| Award | Winner |
|---|---|
| Fans’ Player of the Year | (United Arab Emirates) Omar Abdulrahman |
| Emirati Player of the Year | (United Arab Emirates) Omar Abdulrahman |
| UAE Pro League Top Scorer | (Ghana) Asamoah Gyan |
| Young Player of the Year | (United Arab Emirates) Yousef Ahmed |
