= 2017–18 Al Ain FC season =

Al Ain
2017–18 season
- President: Mohammed Bin Zayed
- Manager: Zoran Mamić
- Stadium: Hazza Bin Zayed
- UAE Pro League: 1st
- President's Cup: Winners
- League Cup: Quarter-finals
- AFC Champions League: Round of 16
- Top goalscorer: League: Marcus Berg (25 goals); All: Marcus Berg (35 goals)
| Home colours | Away colours |

The 2017–18 season was Al Ain Football Club's 50th in existence and the club's 43rd consecutive season in the top-level football league in the UAE.

== Club ==
=== Technical staff ===
| Position | Name |
|---|---|
| Head coach | (Croatia) Zoran Mamić |
| Assistant coach | (Croatia) Damir Krznar (Croatia) Dean Klafurić |
| Technical analyst | (Croatia) Vedran Attias |
| Fitness coach | (Croatia) Ivan Štefanić |
| Goalkeeping coach | (Bosnia and Herzegovina) Miralem Ibrahimović |
| Club doctor | (Croatia) Jurica Rakic |
| Physiotherapist | (Croatia) Ivica Orsolic (Croatia) Marin Polonijo (Croatia) Bozo Sinkovic (Egypt) Abdul Nasser Al Juhani |
| Nutritionist | (Morocco) Mohsen Belhoz |
| U-21 team head coach | (Croatia) Joško Španjić |
| Team Manager | (United Arab Emirates) Matar Obaid Al Sahbani |
| Team Supervisor | (United Arab Emirates) Mohammed Obeid Hammad |
| Team Administrator | (United Arab Emirates) Essam Abdulla |
| Director of football | (United Arab Emirates) Sultan Rashed |

Source: Al Ain Club

=== Board of directors ===
| Office | Name |
|---|---|
| President | (United Arab Emirates) Mohammed Bin Zayed Al Nahyan |
| Vice President | (United Arab Emirates) Hazza Bin Zayed Al Nahyan |
| Chairman of Board of Directors | (United Arab Emirates) Ghanim Mubarak Al Hajeri |
| Vice Chairman of Board of Directors | (United Arab Emirates) Ahmed Humaid Al Mazrouie |
| Board of Directors Member | (United Arab Emirates) Mohammed Obaid Hammad |
| Board of Directors Member | (United Arab Emirates) Sultan Rashed |
| Board of Directors Member | (United Arab Emirates) Ali Msarri |

Source: Al Ain Club

== Players ==
=== First Team ===
| No | Position | Nation | Player | Age | Since |
|---|---|---|---|---|---|
| 17 | GK | (United Arab Emirates) | Khalid Eisa | 28 | 2013 |
| 36 | GK | (United Arab Emirates) | Dawoud Sulaiman | 28 | 2010 |
| 40 | GK | (United Arab Emirates) | Mohammed Abo Sandah | 22 | 2014 |
| 75 | GK | (United Arab Emirates) | Hamad Al-Mansouri | 22 | 2017 |
| 3 | DF | (United Arab Emirates) | Firas Al Khusaibi | 22 | 2016 |
| 5 | DF | (United Arab Emirates) | Ismail Ahmed (vice-captain) | 34 | 2008 |
| 14 | DF | (United Arab Emirates) | Mohammed Fayez (3rd captain) | 28 | 2010 |
| 15 | DF | (United Arab Emirates) | Khaled Abdulrahman | 29 | 2010 |
| 19 | DF | (United Arab Emirates) | Mohanad Salem | 33 | 2008 |
| 21 | DF | (United Arab Emirates) | Fawzi Fayez | 30 | 2009 |
| 23 | DF | (United Arab Emirates) | Mohamed Ahmed | 29 | 2012 |
| 24 | DF | (United Arab Emirates) | Abdullah Ghamran | 23 | 2015 |
| 33 | DF | (Japan) | Tsukasa Shiotani | 29 | 2017 |
| 37 | DF | (United Arab Emirates) | Rashed Muhayer | 30 | 2013 |
| 44 | DF | (United Arab Emirates) | Saeed Juma | 19 | 2017 |
| 6 | MF | (United Arab Emirates) | Amer Abdulrahman | 28 | 2016 |
| 7 | MF | (Brazil) | Caio Lucas | 24 | 2016 |
| 10 | MF | (United Arab Emirates) | Omar Abdulrahman (captain) | 26 | 2008 |
| 11 | MF | (United Arab Emirates) | Bandar Al-Ahbabi | 27 | 2016 |
| 13 | MF | (United Arab Emirates) | Ahmed Barman | 24 | 2013 |
| 16 | MF | (United Arab Emirates) | Mohamed Abdulrahman | 29 | 2008 |
| 18 | MF | (United Arab Emirates) | Ibrahim Diaky | 35 | 2013 |
| 26 | MF | (United Arab Emirates) | Khaled Khalfan | 22 | 2016 |
| 27 | MF | (United Arab Emirates) | Mohsen Abdullah | 23 | 2016 |
| 28 | MF | (United Arab Emirates) | Sulaiman Nasser | 20 | 2017 |
| 29 | MF | (United Arab Emirates) | Mohammed Helal | 21 | 2017 |
| 30 | MF | (United Arab Emirates) | Mohammed Khalfan | 19 | 2016 |
| 43 | MF | (United Arab Emirates) | Rayan Yaslam | 23 | 2014 |
| 71 | MF | (United Arab Emirates) | Abdullah Karama | 21 | 2017 |
| 79 | MF | (United Arab Emirates) | Hussain Abdullah | 21 | 2016 |
| 8 | FW | (United Arab Emirates) | Ali Eid | 20 | 2017 |
| 9 | FW | (Sweden) | Marcus Berg | 31 | 2017 |
| 35 | FW | (United Arab Emirates) | Yousef Ahmed | 24 | 2012 |
| 55 | FW | (Brazil) | Dyanfres Douglas | 30 | 2016 |

=== From Reserve U21 and Youth Academy ===
| No | Position | Player | Nation |
|---|---|---|---|
| 4 | DF | UAE | Saeed Al-Menhali |
| 39 | MF | UAE | Saqer Mohammed |

== Transfers ==
=== In ===
| Date | Position | No. | Name | From | Type | Transfer window | Fee | Team | Ref. |
|---|---|---|---|---|---|---|---|---|---|
| 14 June 2017 | DF | 33 | (Japan) Tsukasa Shiotani | (Japan) Sanfrecce Hiroshima | Transfer | Summer | Undisclosed | First team | |
| 28 June 2017 | FW | 9 | (Sweden) Marcus Berg | (Greece) Panathinaikos | Transfer | Summer | €3,300,000 | First team | |
| 15 January 2018 | FW | 20 | (United Arab Emirates) Ahmed Khalil | (United Arab Emirates) Al Jazira | Transfer | Winter | Free | First team | |

=== Loans in ===
| No. | Pos | Player | From | Start date | End date | Fee | Ref. |
|---|---|---|---|---|---|---|---|
| 74 | MF | (Egypt) Hussein El Shahat | (Egypt) Misr Lel Makkasa | 8 January 2018 | End of Season | €400,000 | |

=== Out ===
| Date | Position | No. | Name | To | Fee | Team | Ref. |
|---|---|---|---|---|---|---|---|
| 19 June 2017 | MF | 29 | (South Korea) Lee Myung-joo | (South Korea) Seoul | Free transfer | First team | |
| 1 July 2017 | DF | – | (United Arab Emirates) Mohammed Al-Dhahri | (United Arab Emirates) Al Wahda | End of loan | First team | |
| 1 July 2017 | DF | 3 | (United Arab Emirates) Dawood Ali | (United Arab Emirates) Shabab Al Ahli | End of loan | First team | |
| 1 July 2017 | FW | 20 | (Saudi Arabia) Nasser Al-Shamrani | (Saudi Arabia) Al Shabab | End of loan | First team | |
| 8 July 2017 | DF | – | (United Arab Emirates) Salem Al-Azizi | (United Arab Emirates) Al Wasl | Free transfer | First team | |
| 31 January 2018 | FW | 55 | (Brazil) Dyanfres Douglas | (Turkey) Alanyaspor | Undisclosed | First team | |

=== Loans out ===
| No. | Pos | Name | To | Start date | End date | Ref. |
|---|---|---|---|---|---|---|
| 70 | MF | (Colombia) Danilo Asprilla | (Saudi Arabia) Al-Fayha | 28 July 2017 | End of Season | |
| 24 | DF | (United Arab Emirates) Abdullah Ghamran | (United Arab Emirates) Ittihad Kalba | 27 September 2017 | End of Season | |
| 39 | MF | (United Arab Emirates) Saqer Mohammed | (United Arab Emirates) Ittihad Kalba | 27 September 2017 | End of Season | |
| 99 | FW | (Syria) Hamza Muhanaeh | (United Arab Emirates) Sharjah | 11 January 2018 | End of Season | |

== Competitions ==
=== Overview ===
| Competition | First match | Last match | Starting round | Final position | Record | | | | | | | |
| Competition | First match | Last match | Starting round | Final position | Pld | W | D | L | GF | GA | GD | Win % |
|---|---|---|---|---|---|---|---|---|---|---|---|---|
| Pro League | 16 September 2017 | 29 April 2018 | Matchday 1 | Winners | 22 | 16 | 5 | 1 | 65 | 23 | +42 | 72.73 |
| President's Cup | 17 January 2018 | 3 May 2018 | Round of 16 | Winners | 4 | 4 | 0 | 0 | 13 | 3 | +10 | 100.00 |
| League Cup | 4 September 2017 | 16 February 2018 | Group stage | Quarter-finals | 7 | 2 | 1 | 4 | 15 | 17 | −2 | 28.57 |
| AFC Champions League | 13 February 2018 | 15 May 2018 | play-offs | Round of 16 | 6 | 2 | 4 | 0 | 13 | 14 | −1 | 33.33 |
| Total | | | | | 39 | 24 | 10 | 5 | 106 | 57 | +49 | 61.54 |

Last updated: 15 May 2018
Source: Soccerway

=== UAE Pro-League ===
==== League table ====
| Pos | Team | Pld | W | D | L | GF | GA | GD | Pts | Qualification |
|---|---|---|---|---|---|---|---|---|---|---|
| 1 | Al Ain (C) | 22 | 16 | 5 | 1 | 65 | 23 | +42 | 53 | Qualification to the 2018 FIFA Club World Cup first round and the 2019 AFC Champions League group stage |
| 2 | Al Wahda | 22 | 14 | 4 | 4 | 50 | 29 | +21 | 46 | Qualification to the 2019 AFC Champions League group stage |
| 3 | Al Wasl | 22 | 12 | 5 | 5 | 42 | 27 | +15 | 41 | Qualification to the 2019 AFC Champions League group stage |
| 4 | Al Nasr | 22 | 11 | 4 | 7 | 30 | 24 | +6 | 37 | Qualification to the 2019 AFC Champions League play-off round |
| 5 | Shabab Al Ahli Dubai | 22 | 7 | 10 | 5 | 25 | 18 | +7 | 31 | |
| 6 | Sharjah | 22 | 8 | 5 | 9 | 26 | 30 | −4 | 29 | |
| 7 | Al Jazira | 22 | 7 | 7 | 8 | 34 | 36 | −2 | 28 | |
| 8 | Ajman | 22 | 7 | 5 | 10 | 25 | 36 | −11 | 26 | |
| 9 | Dibba Al-Fujairah | 22 | 5 | 6 | 11 | 21 | 36 | −15 | 21 | |
| 10 | Al Dhafra | 22 | 4 | 6 | 12 | 24 | 42 | −18 | 18 | |
| 11 | Emirates (Q) | 22 | 4 | 5 | 13 | 20 | 39 | −19 | 17 | Qualified for the UAE Pro-League Play Off |
| 12 | Hatta (Q) | 22 | 4 | 4 | 14 | 30 | 52 | −22 | 16 | Qualified for the UAE Pro-League Play Off |

Updated to match(es) played on 2 March 2018. Source: AGLeague
Rules for classification: 1) points; 2) head-to-head points; 3) head-to-head goal difference; 4) head-to-head goals scored; 5) head-to-head away goals scored; 6) goal difference; 7) number of goals scored; 8) number of away goals scored; 9) fair play ranking 10) draw
(C) Champions; (Q) Qualified for the phase indicated

==== Results summary ====
| Overall | | | | | | | | Home | | | | | | Away | | | | | |
| Pld | W | D | L | GF | GA | GD | Pts | W | D | L | GF | GA | GD | W | D | L | GF | GA | GD |
|---|---|---|---|---|---|---|---|---|---|---|---|---|---|---|---|---|---|---|---|
| 22 | 16 | 5 | 1 | 65 | 23 | +42 | 53 | 8 | 3 | 0 | 42 | 13 | +29 | 8 | 2 | 1 | 23 | 10 | +13 |

Last updated: 29 April 2018.
Source: Competitive matches

==== Matches ====
| 16 September 2017 1 | Al Ain | 2–2 | Al Wasl | Al Ain |
| 20:30 GMT+4 (UAE Time) | Berg 6'; Douglas 56' | Report | Caio 44' (pen.); Lima 63' | Stadium: Hazza bin Zayed; Referee: Mohammed Abdulla |

| 23 September 2017 2 | Hatta | 0–3 | Al Ain | Hatta |
| 17:25 GMT+4 (UAE Time) | | Report | Berg 16', 24'; Douglas 59' | Stadium: Hamdan Bin Rashid; Referee: Sultan Al Marzouqi |

| 29 September 2017 3 | Al Ain | 2–1 | Shabab Al-Ahli | Al Ain |
| 20:15 GMT+4 (UAE Time) | M. Salem 44'; Shiotani 89' | Report | Diop 66' | Stadium: Hazza bin Zayed; Referee: Ammar Al-Jeneibi |

| 14 October 2017 4 | Ajman | 2–3 | Al Ain | Ajman |
| 17:05 GMT+4 (UAE Time) | Adeílson 9'; Malallah 20' | Report | Shiotani 66'; Douglas 67', 82' | Stadium: Rashid Bin Saeed; Referee: Omar Al Ali |

| 21 October 2017 5 | Emirates | 0–2 | Al Ain | Ras Al Khaimah |
| 17:00 GMT+4 (UAE Time) | | Report | Yaslam 39'; Caio 88' | Stadium: Emirates Club; Referee: Mohammed Abdulla |

| 28 October 2017 6 | Al Ain | 3–3 | Sharjah | Al Ain |
| 19:45 GMT+4 (UAE Time) | A. Abdulrahman 36'; M. Salem (red card) 42'; Shiotani 61'; Berg 85' (yellow card) 71' (yellow-red card) 88' | Report | E. Ahmed 26'; O. Jumaa 57'; Vieira 95' (pen.) | Stadium: Hazza bin Zayed; Referee: Yahya Al Mulla |

| 4 November 2017 7 | Al Wahda | 0–1 | Al Ain | Abu Dhabi |
| 19:45 GMT+4 (UAE Time) | | Report | Mohamed Ahmed 82' | Stadium: Al Nahyan; Referee: Yaqoub Al Hammadi |

| 18 November 2017 8 | Al Ain | 2–2 | Al Jazira | Al Ain |
| 19:45 GMT+4 (UAE Time) | Berg 9', 18' | Report | Mabkhout 36', 88' | Stadium: Hazza bin Zayed; Referee: Mohammed Abdulla |

| 23 November 2017 9 | Dibba | 0–0 | Al Ain | Fujairah |
| 16:40 GMT+4 (UAE Time) | | Report | | Stadium: Fujairah Club; Referee: Omar Al Ali |

| 1 December 2017 10 | Al Ain | 2–1 | Al Nasr | Al Ain |
| 19:30 GMT+4 (UAE Time) | Berg 34' (pen.), 61' | Report | Zárate 8' | Stadium: Hazza bin Zayed; Referee: Adel Al Naqbi |

| 8 December 2017 11 | Al Dhafra | 1–2 | Al Ain | Abu Dhabi |
| 16:50 GMT+4 (UAE Time) | Al-Kathiri 81' | Report | M. Abdulrahman 50'; Diaky 59' | Stadium: Hamdan Bin Zayed; Referee: Abdulla Al Ajel |

| 12 January 2018 12 | Al Wasl | 1–3 | Al Ain | Dubai |
| 19:45 GMT+4 (UAE Time) | Caio 90' | Report | I. Ahmed 27'; M. Salem (red card) 45'; O. Abdulrahman 71'; El Shahat 78' | Stadium: Zabeel; Referee: Yaqoub Al Hammadi |

| 21 January 2018 13 | Al Ain | 6–2 | Al Nasr | Al Ain |
| 17:10 GMT+4 (UAE Time) | Yaslam 22'; Khalil 35'; Berg 44', 60'; El Shahat 66'; Barman 72' | Report | Khamis 31'; Samuel 38' | Stadium: Hazza bin Zayed; Referee: Adel Al Naqbi |

| 26 January 2018 14 | Shabab Al Ahli | 1–1 | Al Ain | Dubai |
| 20:00 GMT+4 (UAE Time) | Jassim 77' | Report | Berg 66' | Stadium: Rashid; Referee: Sultan Al Marzouqi |

| 3 February 2018 15 | Al Ain | 7–0 | Ajman | Al Ain |
| 17:20 GMT+4 (UAE Time) | El Shahat 8', 25', 82'; Berg 14'; Caio 30'; Yaslam 51'; Khalil 77' | Report | | Stadium: Hazza bin Zayed; Referee: Sultan Mohamed |

| 8 February 2018 16 | Al Ain | 3–0 | Emirates | Al Ain |
| 20:00 GMT+4 (UAE Time) | El Shahat 4'; Khalil 16'; Caio 40' | Report | | Stadium: Hazza bin Zayed; Referee: Ahmed Essa |

| 24 February 2018 17 | Sharjah | 3–1 | Al Ain | Sharjah |
| 20:15 GMT+4 (UAE Time) | Vieira 4' (pen.), 66' (pen.); Lulinha 88' | Report | O. Abdulrahman 15' (pen.) | Stadium: Sharjah; Referee: Ammar Al-Jeneibi |

| 1 March 2018 18 | Al Ain | 6–2 | Al Wahda | Al Ain |
| 20:15 GMT+4 (UAE Time) | Berg 32', 72'; Caio 41'; O. Abdulrahman 75'; El Shahat 80'; Yaslam 90' | Report | Dzsudzsák 68', 70' | Stadium: Hazza bin Zayed; Referee: Mohammed Abdulla |

| 17 March 2018 19 | Al Jazira | 2–3 | Al Ain | Abu Dhabi |
| 20:30 GMT+4 (UAE Time) | Romarinho 81'; Mabkhout 90' | Report | Berg 11'; O. Abdulrahman 69' (pen.), 83' | Stadium: Mohammed bin Zayed; Referee: Yaqoub Al Hammadi |

| 6 April 2018 20 | Al Ain | 4–0 | Dibba | Al Ain |
| 17:50 GMT+4 (UAE Time) | Berg 15' (pen.), 19', 75' (pen.); Caio 83' | Report | | Stadium: Hazza bin Zayed; Referee: Ahmed Essa |

| 21 April 2018 21 | Al Nasr | 0–4 | Al Ain | Dubai |
| 18:00 GMT+4 (UAE Time) | | Report | Berg 35', 44', 62'; Khalil 90' | Stadium: Al Maktoum; Referee: Sultan Al Marzouqi |

| 29 April 2018 22 | Al Ain | 5–0 | Al Dhafra | Al Ain |
| 19:20 GMT+4 (UAE Time) | Berg 25', 72', 84' (pen.), 87'; Diaky 67' | Report | | Stadium: Hazza bin Zayed; Referee: Yahya Al Mulla |

=== President's Cup ===
| 17 January 2018 Round of 16 | Al Ain | 1–0 | Al Dhafra | Al Ain |
| 17:05 | Berg 22' | Report | | Stadium: Mohammed bin Zayed Stadium |

| 12 April 2018 Quarter-finals | Al Ain | 4–2 | Fujairah | Al Ain |
| | Khalil 29'; Shahat 30', 39'; Caio 90+2' | Report | Khamis 8'; Khaled 53' | Stadium: Mohammed bin Zayed Stadium |

| 25 April 2018 Semi-finals | Shabab Al-Ahli | 0–6 | Al Ain | Dubai |
| | | Report | Caio 4', 74'; El Shahat 9'; Berg 65'; Khalil 82'; Bandar 90+2' | Stadium: Rashid Stadium |

| 3 May 2018 Final | Al Wasl | 1–2 | Al Ain | Abu Dhabi |
| | Caio 90+2' | Report | Ismail 3'; Berg 50' | Stadium: Zayed Sports City Stadium |

=== League Cup ===
==== Group stage ====
===== Group A =====
| Team | Pld | W | D | L | GF | GA | GD | Pts |
|---|---|---|---|---|---|---|---|---|
| Al Jazira | 5 | 3 | 1 | 1 | 8 | 4 | +4 | 10 |
| Al Nasr | 5 | 3 | 1 | 1 | 8 | 3 | +5 | 10 |
| Al Ain | 5 | 2 | 1 | 2 | 13 | 10 | +3 | 7 |
| Hatta | 5 | 1 | 3 | 1 | 5 | 5 | 0 | 6 |
| Ajman | 5 | 1 | 1 | 3 | 5 | 8 | −3 | 4 |
| Al Dhafra | 5 | 1 | 1 | 3 | 5 | 14 | −9 | 4 |

Source: Soccerway

| 4 September 2017 1 | Al Ain | 2–2 | Hatta | Al Ain |
| 17:25 | Yousef Ahmed 40'; Caio 53' (pen.) | Report | Mahir Jasem 5'; Fernando Gabriel 25' | Stadium: Sheikh Khalifa International Stadium; Referee: Yahya Mohammed Ali Hassan Al Mulla |

| 6 October 2017 2 | Al Jazira | 2–1 | Al Ain | Abu Dhabi |
| 20:00 | Al Ghilani 44'; Al-Eidi 68' | Report | Caio 51' (pen.) | Stadium: Mohammed Bin Zayed Stadium |

| 11 November 2017 3 | Al Ain | 7–1 | Al Dhafra | Al-Ain |
| 16:50 | Douglas 26', 31', 45', 57'; Caio 35', 69'; Yousef Ahmed 90' | Report | Abdulqader 86' | Stadium: Hazza Bin Zayed Stadium |

| 14 December 2017 4 | Ajman | 2–3 | Al Ain | Ajman |
| 16:45 | Kone 52'; Abdulrahman 64' | Report | Diaky 28'; Douglas 77'; Abdullah 84' | Stadium: Ajman Stadium |

| 21 December 2017 5 | Al Nasr | 3–0 | Al Ain | Dubai |
| 19:45 | Marcelo Cirino 2'; Saleh 17', 62' | Report | | Stadium: Zabeel Stadium |

===== Quarter-finals =====
| 29 December 2017 First leg | Al Ain | 1–2 | Al Wahda | Hazza bin Zayed Stadium |
| 17:15 | Berg 84' (pen.) | Report | Tagliabué 70'; Al-Akbari 87' | Referee: Sultan Abdurazzaq |

| 16 February 2018 Second leg | Al Wahda | 5–1 | Al Ain | Al Nahyan Stadium |
| 20:00 | Batna 9'; Ahmed 41'; Tagliabué 62'; Al Shehhi 78'; Al Akbari 79' | Report | Khalil 31' |

=== Play-off round ===
| 30 January 2018 | Al-Ain (United Arab Emirates) | 2–0 | (Bahrain) Malkiya | Hazza bin Zayed Stadium, Al Ain |
| 18:15 UTC+4 | Berg 53'; Caio 61' | Live Report; Stats Report | | Attendance: 5,063; Referee: Mohd Amirul Izwan Yaacob (Malaysia) |

==== Group stage ====
===== Group D =====
| Pos | Team | Pld | W | D | L | GF | GA | GD | Pts | Qualification | EST | AIN | RAY | HIL |
|---|---|---|---|---|---|---|---|---|---|---|---|---|---|---|
| 1 | (Iran) Esteghlal | 6 | 3 | 3 | 0 | 9 | 5 | +4 | 12 | Advance to knockout stage | — | 1–1 | 2–0 | 1–0 |
| 2 | (United Arab Emirates) Al-Ain | 6 | 2 | 4 | 0 | 10 | 6 | +4 | 10 | Advance to knockout stage | 2–2 | — | 1–1 | 2–1 |
| 3 | (Qatar) Al-Rayyan | 6 | 1 | 3 | 2 | 7 | 11 | −4 | 6 | | 2–2 | 1–4 | — | 2–1 |
| 4 | (Saudi Arabia) Al-Hilal | 6 | 0 | 2 | 4 | 3 | 7 | −4 | 2 | | 0–1 | 0–0 | 1–1 | — |

Source: AFC

| 13 February 2018 | Al-Hilal (Saudi Arabia) | 0–0 | (United Arab Emirates) Al-Ain | King Saud University Stadium, Riyadh |
| 20:25 UTC+3 | | Live Report; Stats Report | | Attendance: 24,010; Referee: Ahmed Al-Kaf (Oman) |

| 20 February 2018 | Al-Ain (United Arab Emirates) | 1–1 | (Qatar) Al-Rayyan | Hazza bin Zayed Stadium, Al Ain |
| 19:10 UTC+4 | Berg 10' (pen.) | Live Report; Stats Report | Hamdallah 28' (pen.) | Attendance: 8,856; Referee: Mohanad Qassim (Iraq) |

| 6 March 2018 | Al-Ain (United Arab Emirates) | 2–2 | (Iran) Esteghlal | Hazza bin Zayed Stadium, Al Ain |
| 19:20 UTC+4 | Berg 63'; Khalil 89' (pen.) | Live Report; Stats Report | Thiam 52', 77' | Attendance: 10,036; Referee: Mohd Amirul Izwan Yaacob (Malaysia) |

| 12 March 2018 | Esteghlal (Iran) | 1–1 | (United Arab Emirates) Al-Ain | Azadi Stadium, Tehran |
| 19:00 UTC+3:30 | Thiam 42' (pen.) | Live Report; Stats Report | Shiotani 78' | Attendance: 90,000; Referee: Liu Kwok Man (Hong Kong) |

| 2 April 2018 | Al-Ain (United Arab Emirates) | 2–1 | (Saudi Arabia) Al-Hilal | Hazza bin Zayed Stadium, Al Ain |
| 19:30 UTC+4 | Berg 40' (pen.), 45+2' (pen.) | Live Report; Stats Report | Al-Breik 7' | Attendance: 15,126; Referee: Ma Ning (China) |

| 16 April 2018 | Al-Rayyan (Qatar) | 1–4 | (United Arab Emirates) Al-Ain | Jassim bin Hamad Stadium, Doha |
| 18:45 UTC+3 | Soria 85' | Live Report; Stats Report | El Shahat 11'; O. Abdulrahman 55'; Berg 58', 78' | Attendance: 6,178; Referee: Ravshan Irmatov (Uzbekistan) |

===== Knockout stage =====
| 8 May 2018 | Al-Ain (United Arab Emirates) | 2–4 | (Qatar) Al-Duhail | Hazza bin Zayed Stadium, Al Ain |
| 20:10 UTC+4 | Khalil 68'; Diaky 86' | Live Report; Stats Report | El-Arabi 16'; Nam Tae-hee 39'; Mohammad 48'; Ali 55' | Attendance: 7,124; Referee: Hettikamkanamge Perera (Sri Lanka) |

| 15 May 2018 | Al-Duhail (Qatar) | 4–1 | (United Arab Emirates) Al-Ain | Abdullah bin Khalifa Stadium, Doha |
| 18:30 UTC+3 | M. Ahmed 12' (o.g.); El-Arabi 30', 86' (pen.); Mohammad 54' | Live Report; Stats Report | O. Abdulrahman 90+4' (pen.) | Attendance: 6,853; Referee: Muhammad Taqi (Singapore) |

Al-Duhail won 8–3 on aggregate.

== Statistics ==
=== Squad appearances and goals ===
Last updated on 15 May 2018.

| No. | Pos | Nat | Player | Total | | Pro League | | President's Cup | | League Cup | | Champions League | |
| No. | Pos | Nat | Player | Apps | Goals | Apps | Goals | Apps | Goals | Apps | Goals | Apps | Goals |
Goalkeepers
| 17 | GK | (United Arab Emirates) UAE | Khalid Eisa | 33 | 0 | 21 | 0 | 3 | 0 | 1 | 0 | 8 | 0 |
| 36 | GK | (United Arab Emirates) UAE | Dawoud Sulaiman | 0 | 0 | 0 | 0 | 0 | 0 | 0 | 0 | 0 | 0 |
| 40 | GK | (United Arab Emirates) UAE | Mohammed Abo Sandah | 8 | 0 | 1 | 0 | 1 | 0 | 6 | 0 | 0 | 0 |
| 75 | GK | (United Arab Emirates) UAE | Hamad Al-Mansouri | 0 | 0 | 0 | 0 | 0 | 0 | 0 | 0 | 0 | 0 |
Defenders
| 2 | DF | (United Arab Emirates) UAE | Ali Al-Haidhani | 0 | 0 | 0 | 0 | 0 | 0 | 0 | 0 | 0 | 0 |
| 3 | DF | (United Arab Emirates) UAE | Firas Al Khusaibi | 3 | 0 | 0 | 0 | 0 | 0 | 3 | 0 | 0 | 0 |
| 4 | DF | (United Arab Emirates) UAE | Saeed Al-Menhali | 0 | 0 | 0 | 0 | 0 | 0 | 0 | 0 | 0 | 0 |
| 5 | DF | (United Arab Emirates) UAE | Ismail Ahmed | 29 | 2 | 18 | 1 | 3 | 1 | 1 | 0 | 7 | 0 |
| 14 | DF | (United Arab Emirates) UAE | Mohammed Fayez | 14 | 0 | 4 | 0 | 2 | 0 | 5 | 0 | 3 | 0 |
| 15 | DF | (United Arab Emirates) UAE | Khaled Abdulrahman | 14 | 0 | 9 | 0 | 1 | 0 | 4 | 0 | 0 | 0 |
| 19 | DF | (United Arab Emirates) UAE | Mohanad Salem | 27 | 1 | 17 | 1 | 2 | 0 | 1 | 0 | 7 | 0 |
| 21 | DF | (United Arab Emirates) UAE | Fawzi Fayez | 4 | 0 | 0 | 0 | 0 | 0 | 4 | 0 | 0 | 0 |
| 23 | DF | (United Arab Emirates) UAE | Mohamed Ahmed | 32 | 1 | 20 | 1 | 4 | 0 | 0 | 0 | 8 | 0 |
| 31 | DF | (United Arab Emirates) UAE | Ahmed Salem | 3 | 0 | 0 | 0 | 0 | 0 | 3 | 0 | 0 | 0 |
| 33 | DF | (Japan) JPN | Tsukasa Shiotani | 30 | 5 | 18 | 3 | 3 | 1 | 1 | 0 | 8 | 1 |
| 37 | DF | (United Arab Emirates) UAE | Rashed Muhayer | 12 | 0 | 6 | 0 | 0 | 0 | 6 | 0 | 0 | 0 |
| 44 | DF | (United Arab Emirates) UAE | Saeed Juma | 12 | 0 | 7 | 0 | 1 | 0 | 4 | 0 | 0 | 0 |
| 56 | DF | (United Arab Emirates) UAE | Salem Abdullah | 1 | 0 | 0 | 0 | 0 | 0 | 1 | 0 | 0 | 0 |
| 58 | DF | (United Arab Emirates) UAE | Falah Waleed | 0 | 0 | 0 | 0 | 0 | 0 | 0 | 0 | 0 | 0 |
Midfielders
| 6 | MF | (United Arab Emirates) UAE | Amer Abdulrahman | 26 | 1 | 16 | 1 | 1 | 0 | 2 | 0 | 7 | 0 |
| 7 | MF | (Brazil) BRA | Caio Lucas | 33 | 12 | 19 | 5 | 3 | 3 | 5 | 4 | 6 | 0 |
| 10 | MF | (United Arab Emirates) UAE | Omar Abdulrahman | 24 | 7 | 13 | 5 | 3 | 0 | 1 | 0 | 7 | 2 |
| 11 | MF | (United Arab Emirates) UAE | Bandar Al-Ahbabi | 25 | 1 | 13 | 0 | 4 | 1 | 2 | 0 | 6 | 0 |
| 13 | MF | (United Arab Emirates) UAE | Ahmed Barman | 29 | 1 | 19 | 1 | 3 | 0 | 0 | 0 | 7 | 0 |
| 16 | MF | (United Arab Emirates) UAE | Mohamed Abdulrahman | 25 | 1 | 14 | 1 | 4 | 0 | 1 | 0 | 6 | 0 |
| 18 | MF | (United Arab Emirates) UAE | Ibrahim Diaky | 15 | 4 | 7 | 2 | 1 | 0 | 4 | 1 | 3 | 1 |
| 26 | MF | (United Arab Emirates) UAE | Khaled Khalfan | 3 | 0 | 0 | 0 | 0 | 0 | 3 | 0 | 0 | 0 |
| 27 | MF | (United Arab Emirates) UAE | Mohsen Abdullah | 14 | 1 | 6 | 0 | 1 | 0 | 7 | 1 | 0 | 0 |
| 28 | MF | (United Arab Emirates) UAE | Sulaiman Nasser | 3 | 0 | 0 | 0 | 0 | 0 | 3 | 0 | 0 | 0 |
| 43 | MF | (United Arab Emirates) UAE | Rayan Yaslam | 35 | 4 | 20 | 4 | 4 | 0 | 3 | 0 | 8 | 0 |
| 51 | MF | (United Arab Emirates) UAE | Khalid Al-Balochi | 1 | 0 | 0 | 0 | 0 | 0 | 1 | 0 | 0 | 0 |
| 71 | MF | (United Arab Emirates) UAE | Abdullah Karama | 1 | 0 | 0 | 0 | 0 | 0 | 1 | 0 | 0 | 0 |
| 74 | MF | (Egypt) EGY | Hussein El Shahat | 20 | 11 | 11 | 7 | 4 | 3 | 0 | 0 | 5 | 1 |
| 79 | MF | (United Arab Emirates) UAE | Hussain Abdullah | 3 | 0 | 0 | 0 | 0 | 0 | 3 | 0 | 0 | 0 |
Forwards
| 8 | FW | (United Arab Emirates) UAE | Ali Eid | 2 | 0 | 0 | 0 | 0 | 0 | 2 | 0 | 0 | 0 |
| 9 | FW | (Sweden) SWE | Marcus Berg | 33 | 35 | 21 | 25 | 3 | 3 | 2 | 1 | 7 | 6 |
| 20 | FW | (United Arab Emirates) UAE | Ahmed Khalil | 20 | 9 | 9 | 4 | 3 | 2 | 1 | 1 | 7 | 2 |
| 30 | FW | (United Arab Emirates) UAE | Mohammed Khalfan | 7 | 0 | 3 | 0 | 0 | 0 | 4 | 0 | 0 | 0 |
| 35 | FW | (United Arab Emirates) UAE | Yousef Ahmed | 13 | 2 | 5 | 0 | 1 | 0 | 7 | 2 | 0 | 0 |
Players transferred out during the season
| 55 | FW | (Brazil) BRA | Dyanfres Douglas | 13 | 9 | 8 | 4 | 0 | 0 | 5 | 5 | 0 | 0 |

=== Disciplinary record ===
| N | P | Nat. | Name | Pro League | | | League Cup | | | President's Cup | | | Champions League | | | Total | | | Notes |
| N | P | Nat. | Name | Yellow card | Second yellow card | Red card | Yellow card | Second yellow card | Red card | Yellow card | Second yellow card | Red card | Yellow card | Second yellow card | Red card | Yellow card | Second yellow card | Red card | Notes |
| 5 | DF | (United Arab Emirates) | Ismail Ahmed | 1 | | | | | | 1 | 1 | | 3 | | | 5 | 1 | | |
| 6 | MF | (United Arab Emirates) | Amer Abdulrahman | 2 | | | | | | 1 | | | | | | 3 | | | |
| 7 | MF | (Brazil) | Caio Lucas | 4 | | | 1 | | | 1 | | | 1 | | 1 | 7 | | 1 | |
| 9 | FW | (Sweden) | Marcus Berg | 1 | 1 | | | | | | | | | | | 1 | 1 | | |
| 10 | MF | (United Arab Emirates) | Omar Abdulrahman | 4 | | | | | | | | | 1 | | | 5 | | | |
| 11 | MF | (United Arab Emirates) | Bandar Al-Ahbabi | 1 | | | | | | | | | 1 | | | 2 | | | |
| 13 | MF | (United Arab Emirates) | Ahmed Barman | 5 | | | | | | | | | 2 | | | 7 | | | |
| 14 | DF | (United Arab Emirates) | Mohammed Fayez | 2 | | | 2 | | | | | | 1 | | | 5 | | | |
| 15 | DF | (United Arab Emirates) | Khaled Abdulrahman | 1 | | | 1 | | | | | | | | | 2 | | | |
| 16 | MF | (United Arab Emirates) | Mohamed Abdulrahman | 3 | | | | | | | | | 2 | 1 | | 5 | 1 | | |
| 17 | GK | (United Arab Emirates) | Khalid Eisa | 3 | | | | | | | | | 1 | | | 4 | | | |
| 18 | MF | (United Arab Emirates) | Ibrahim Diaky | | | | 1 | | | | | | | | | 1 | | | |
| 19 | DF | (United Arab Emirates) | Mohanad Salem | 1 | | 2 | | | | | | | 3 | | | 4 | | 2 | |
| 23 | DF | (United Arab Emirates) | Mohamed Ahmed | 3 | | | | | | 1 | | | | | | 4 | | | |
| 27 | MF | (United Arab Emirates) | Mohsen Abdullah | | | | | | | 1 | | | | | | 1 | | | |
| 30 | MF | (United Arab Emirates) | Mohammed Khalfan | | | | 2 | | | | | | | | | 2 | | | |
| 31 | DF | (United Arab Emirates) | Ahmed Salem | | | | 1 | | | | | | | | | 1 | | | |
| 33 | DF | (Japan) | Tsukasa Shiotani | 1 | | | | | | | | | | | | 1 | | | |
| 37 | DF | (United Arab Emirates) | Rashed Muhayer | | | | 1 | | | | | | | | | 1 | | | |
| 40 | GK | (United Arab Emirates) | Mohammed Abo Sandah | 1 | | | | | | | | | | | | 1 | | | |
| 43 | MF | (United Arab Emirates) | Rayan Yaslam | | | | | | | | | | 1 | | | 1 | | | |
| 44 | DF | (United Arab Emirates) | Saeed Juma | 2 | | | | 1 | | | | | | | | 2 | 1 | | |
| 55 | FW | (Brazil) | Douglas | 3 | | | | | | | | | | | | 3 | | | |
| 74 | MF | (Egypt) | Hussein El Shahat | | | | | | | | | | 2 | | | 2 | | | |

Last updated: 15 May 2018
Source: UAEProLeague.ae, AlAinClub.ae, The-Afc.com
Only competitive matches
(yellow card) = Number of bookings; (second yellow card) = Number of sending offs after a second yellow card; (red card) = Number of sending offs by a direct red card.

=== Hat-tricks ===
| Player | Against | Result | Date | Competition |
|---|---|---|---|---|
| (Brazil) Douglas^{4} | Al Dhafra | 7–1 (H) | 11 November 2017 | League Cup |
| (Egypt) Hussein El Shahat | Ajman | 7–0 (H) | 3 February 2018 | Pro League (Round 15) |
| (Sweden) Marcus Berg | Dibba | 4–0 (H) | 6 April 2018 | Pro League (Round 20) |
| (Sweden) Marcus Berg | Al Nasr | 0–4 (A) | 21 April 2018 | Pro League (Round 21) |
| (Sweden) Marcus Berg^{4} | Al Dhafra | 5–0 (H) | 29 April 2018 | Pro League (Round 22) |

^{4} – Player scored four goals.

=== Goalscorers ===
As of 15 May 2018

Includes all competitive matches. The list is sorted alphabetically by surname when total goals are equal.

| Rank | No. | Pos. | Player | Pro-League | President's Cup | League Cup | Champions League | Total |
|---|---|---|---|---|---|---|---|---|
| 1 | 9 | FW | (Sweden) Marcus Berg | 25 | 3 | 1 | 6 | 35 |
| 2 | 7 | MF | (Brazil) Caio Lucas | 5 | 3 | 4 | 0 | 12 |
| 3 | 74 | MF | (Egypt) Hussein El Shahat | 7 | 3 | 0 | 1 | 11 |
| 4 | 20 | FW | (United Arab Emirates) Ahmed Khalil | 4 | 2 | 1 | 2 | 9 |
| 4 | 55 | FW | (Brazil) Douglas | 4 | 0 | 5 | 0 | 9 |
| 6 | 10 | MF | (United Arab Emirates) Omar Abdulrahman | 5 | 0 | 0 | 2 | 7 |
| 7 | 43 | MF | (United Arab Emirates) Rayan Yaslam | 4 | 0 | 0 | 0 | 4 |
| 7 | 33 | DF | (Japan) Tsukasa Shiotani | 3 | 0 | 0 | 1 | 4 |
| 7 | 18 | MF | (United Arab Emirates) Ibrahim Diaky | 2 | 0 | 1 | 1 | 4 |
| 10 | 35 | FW | (United Arab Emirates) Yousef Ahmed | 0 | 0 | 2 | 0 | 2 |
| 10 | 5 | DF | (United Arab Emirates) Ismail Ahmed | 1 | 1 | 0 | 0 | 2 |
| 12 | 16 | MF | (United Arab Emirates) Mohamed Abdulrahman | 1 | 0 | 0 | 0 | 1 |
| 12 | 13 | MF | (United Arab Emirates) Ahmed Barman | 1 | 0 | 0 | 0 | 1 |
| 12 | 23 | DF | (United Arab Emirates) Mohamed Ahmed | 1 | 0 | 0 | 0 | 1 |
| 12 | 6 | MF | (United Arab Emirates) Amer Abdulrahman | 1 | 0 | 0 | 0 | 1 |
| 12 | 19 | DF | (United Arab Emirates) Mohanad Salem | 1 | 0 | 0 | 0 | 1 |
| 12 | 11 | MF | (United Arab Emirates) Bandar Al-Ahbabi | 0 | 1 | 0 | 0 | 1 |
| 12 | 27 | MF | (United Arab Emirates) Mohsen Abdullah | 0 | 0 | 1 | 0 | 1 |
| Own goals | | | | 0 | 0 | 0 | 0 | 0 |
| Totals | | | | 65 | 13 | 15 | 13 | 106 |

=== Assists ===
| No. | Player | Pro-League | President's Cup | League Cup | Champions League |
|---|---|---|---|---|---|
| 9 | (Sweden) Marcus Berg | 10 | 0 | 0 | 0 |
| 74 | (Egypt) Hussein El Shahat | 9 | 0 | 0 | 0 |
| 7 | (Brazil) Caio Lucas | 9 | 0 | 0 | 0 |
| 43 | (United Arab Emirates) Rayan Yaslam | 4 | 0 | 0 | 0 |
| 10 | (United Arab Emirates) Omar Abdulrahman | 4 | 0 | 0 | 0 |
| 33 | (Japan) Tsukasa Shiotani | 2 | 0 | 0 | 0 |
| 18 | (United Arab Emirates) Ibrahim Diaky | 2 | 0 | 0 | 0 |
| 55 | (Brazil) Douglas | 2 | 0 | 0 | 0 |
| 14 | (United Arab Emirates) Mohammed Fayez | 2 | 0 | 0 | 0 |
| 6 | (United Arab Emirates) Amer Abdulrahman | 1 | 0 | 0 | 0 |
| 11 | (United Arab Emirates) Bandar Al-Ahbabi | 1 | 0 | 0 | 0 |
| 16 | (United Arab Emirates) Mohamed Abdulrahman | 1 | 0 | 0 | 0 |
| 23 | (United Arab Emirates) Mohamed Ahmed | 1 | 0 | 0 | 0 |
| 13 | (United Arab Emirates) Ahmed Barman | 1 | 0 | 0 | 0 |
| Totals | | 49 | 0 | 0 | 0 |

=== Clean sheets ===
| Rank | No. | Player | Pro-League | President's Cup | League Cup | Champions League | Total |
|---|---|---|---|---|---|---|---|
| 1 | 17 | (United Arab Emirates) Khalid Eisa | 9 | 1 | 0 | 1 | 11 |
| 2 | 40 | (United Arab Emirates) Mohammed Abo Sandah | 0 | 1 | 0 | 0 | 1 |
| Totals | | | 9 | 2 | 0 | 1 | 12 |
