= Rashid Mubarak =

Emirati association football player (born 1999)

Rashid Mubarak راشد مبارك
Personal information
- Full name: Rashid Salem Khalfan Mubarak
- Date of birth: 8 March 1999 (age 27)
- Place of birth: Emirates
- Height: 1.61 m (5 ft 3 in)
- Position: Winger

Team information
- Current team: Hatta
- Number: 7

Youth career
- –2018: Hatta

Senior career*
Years	Team	Apps	(Gls)
2018–2022	Hatta	25	(0)
2022–2023	Al-Nasr	5	(0)
2023–2025	Al Urooba		
2025–	Hatta	0	(0)

International career
- U20 UAE
- * Club domestic league appearances and goals

Rashid Mubarak (Arabic: راشد مبارك; born 8 March 1999) is an Emirati footballer. He currently plays as a winger for Hatta.

== Career ==
Rashid Mubarak started his career at Hatta and is a product of the Hatta's youth system. On 26 January 2018, Rashid Mubarak made his professional debut for Hatta against Al Dhafra in the Pro League, replacing Hamdan Qassem. Landed with Hatta from the UAE Pro League to the UAE First Division League in 2017–18 season. Ended up with Hatta from the UAE First Division League to the UAE Pro League in the 2017–18 season.
