= 2017–18 UAE Pro League =

UAE Pro-League
- Season: 2017–18
- Champions: Al Ain (13th title)
- Relegated: Hatta
- 2019 AFC Champions League: Al Ain; Al Wahda; Al Wasl; Al Nasr
- 2018 FIFA Club World Cup: Al Ain
- Matches: 228
- Goals: 391 (1.71 per match)
- Average goals/game: 1.71
- Top goalscorer: (Sweden) Marcus Berg (25)
- Biggest home win: Al Ain 7–0 Ajman (3 February 2018)
- Biggest away win: Hatta 1–5 Al Nasr (17 November 2017); Al Nasr 0–4 Al Ain (21 April 2018)
- Highest scoring: Al Ain 6–2 Hatta (21 January 2018); Al Ain 6–2 Al Wahda (1 March 2018)
- Longest winning run: Al Nasr (6 games)
- Longest unbeaten run: Al Ain (16 games)
- Longest winless run: Al Dhafra (13 games)
- Longest losing run: Emirates (6 games)
- Highest attendance: Al Ain 6–2 Al Wahda (20,786)
- Lowest attendance: Hatta 1–2 Dibba Al Fujairah (501)
- Average attendance: 418

The 2017–18 UAE Pro League was the 43rd season of top-level football in the United Arab Emirates. Al-Jazira are the defending champions after winning their second title last season.

Ajman and Dubai both got promoted on 22 April 2017 after beating Fujairah 3–2 and Ras Al Khaimah 2–0. On 3 May 2017, Baniyas were the first team to get relegated from 2016–17 season after drawing 4–4 against Emirates. Ittihad Kalba were the last team to get relegated after losing to Al-Ain 2–1 and both Emirates and Dibba Al-Fujairah didn't lose in the same week. In July 2017, Al Ahli, Al Shabab and Dubai merged to form Shabab Al Ahli Dubai.

On 20 April 2018, Hatta lost to Al Wasl 2–0 and were the first team to get relegated. On 21 April 2018, Al Ain were crowned champions for the 13th time after destroying Al Nasr 4–0. On the final day, Emirates were relegated after drawing against Al Nasr 2–2. In May 2012, it was decided that since the league needs 14 teams for next season, the bottom two teams of this season would have to face 3rd and 4th-placed team of the 2nd division to see who will secure spots for next season.

== Stadia and locations ==
Locations of teams in the 2017–18 UAE Pro League

Note: Table lists clubs in alphabetical order.

Club	Home city	Stadium	Capacity
Ajman	Ajman	Ajman Stadium	5,537
Al-Ain	Al-Ain	Hazza Bin Zayed Stadium	22,717
Al-Dhafra	Madinat Zayed	Al Dhafra Stadium	5,020
Al-Jazira	Abu Dhabi	Mohammad Bin Zayed Stadium	42,056
Al-Nasr	Dubai	Al-Maktoum Stadium	12,000
Al-Wahda	Abu Dhabi	Al Nahyan Stadium	12,000
Al-Wasl	Dubai	Zabeel Stadium	8,439
Dibba Al-Fujairah	Fujairah	Fujairah Club Stadium	10,645
Emirates	Ras Al-Khaimah	Emirates Club Stadium	5,200
Hatta	Hatta	Hamdan Bin Rashid Stadium	5,000
Shabab Al Ahli	Dubai	Dubai Club Stadium	7,500
Sharjah	Sharjah	Sharjah Stadium	11,073

=== Number of teams by Emirates ===
Rank	Emirate	Number of teams	Teams
1	(Emirate of Dubai) Dubai	4	Shabab Al Ahli Dubai, Al Nasr, Al Wasl, Hatta
1	(Emirate of Abu Dhabi) Abu Dhabi	4	Al Ain, Al Dhafra, Al Jazira, Al Wahda
2	(Emirate of Sharjah) Sharjah	1	Sharjah
2	(Emirate of Ajman) Ajman	1	Ajman
2	(Emirate of Ras Al Khaimah) Ras al-Khaimah	1	Emirates
2	(Emirate of Fujairah) Fujairah	1	Dibba Al Fujairah

== Personnel and kits ==
Note: Flags indicate national team as has been defined under FIFA eligibility rules. Players may hold more than one non-FIFA nationality.

Team	Head coach	Captain	Kit manufacturer	Shirt sponsor
Ajman	(Egypt) Ayman Elramady	(United Arab Emirates) Abdullah Malallah	Uhlsport	Ajman Bank
Al-Ain	(Croatia) Zoran Mamić	(United Arab Emirates) Omar Abdulrahman	Nike	First Gulf Bank
Al-Dhafra	(North Macedonia) Gjoko Hadžievski	(Morocco) Issam El Adoua	Adidas	Adnoc
Al-Jazira	(Netherlands) Henk ten Cate	(United Arab Emirates) Ali Khasif	Adidas	IPIC
Al-Nasr	(Serbia) Ivan Jovanović	(United Arab Emirates) Tareq Ahmed	Nike	Emirates NBD; Dubai Silicon Oasis
Al-Wahda	(Romania) Laurențiu Reghecampf	(United Arab Emirates) Ismail Matar	Adidas	Al-Wahda Mall
Al-Wasl	(Argentina) Rodolfo Arruabarrena	(United Arab Emirates) Waheed Ismail	Macron	Saif Belhasa Holding
Dibba Al-Fujairah	(Brazil) Paulo Comelli	(United Arab Emirates) Abdullah Nasser	Uhlsport	Uhlsport
Emirates	(Ba'athist Syria) Nizar Mahrous	(Argentina) Sebastián Sáez	Uhlsport	Al Naeem City Center
Hatta	(United Arab Emirates) Abdelmajeed Alzarooni	(United Arab Emirates) Mahmoud Hassan	Macron	Macron
Shabab Al-Ahli	(United Arab Emirates) Mahdi Ali	(United Arab Emirates) Majed Naser	Nike	Skydive Dubai
Sharjah	(United Arab Emirates) Abdulaziz Mohamed	(United Arab Emirates) Eisa Ahmed	Macron	

=== Managerial changes ===
Team	Outgoing manager	Date of vacancy	Manner of departure	Pos.	Incoming manager	Date of appointment
Al-Nasr	(Romania) Dan Petrescu	26 May 2017	End of contract	Pre-season	(Italy) Cesare Prandelli	26 May 2017
Al-Wahda	(Mexico) Javier Aguirre	31 May 2017	End of contract	Pre-season	(Romania) Laurențiu Reghecampf	2 June 2017
Hatta	(North Macedonia) Gjoko Hadžievski	6 October 2017	Sacked	11th	(Ba'athist Syria) Nizar Mahrous	6 October 2017
Sharjah	(Portugal) José Peseiro	15 October 2017	Sacked	11th	(United Arab Emirates) Abdulaziz Mohamed	15 October 2017
Emirates	(Czech Republic) Ivan Hašek	31 October 2017	Sacked	10th	(Tunisia) Noureddine Abidi (caretaker)	1 November 2017
Shabab Al-Ahli	(Romania) Cosmin Olăroiu	2 December 2017	End of contract	4th	(United Arab Emirates) Mahdi Ali	2 December 2017
Emirates	(Tunisia) Noureddine Abidi (caretaker)	5 January 2018	End of caretaker spell	11th	(United Arab Emirates) Nour Al Obaidi	5 January 2018
Al-Dhafra	(Ba'athist Syria) Mohammad Kwid	13 January 2018	Sacked	12th	(North Macedonia) Gjoko Hadžievski	13 January 2018
Al-Nasr	(Italy) Cesare Prandelli	19 January 2018	Sacked	4th	(Serbia) Ivan Jovanović	19 January 2018
Hatta	(Ba'athist Syria) Nizar Mahrous	20 April 2018	Signed by Emirates	12th	(United Arab Emirates) Abdelmajeed Alzarooni	20 April 2018
Emirates	(United Arab Emirates) Nour Al Obaidi	20 April 2018	Sacked	11th	(Ba'athist Syria) Nizar Mahrous	20 April 2018

=== Foreign players ===
Restricting the number of foreign players strictly to four per team, including a slot for a player from AFC countries. A team could use four foreign players on the field during each game including at least one player from the AFC country.

- Players name in **bold** indicates the player was registered during the mid-season transfer window.
- Players name in italic indicates the player was de-registered or left their respectively clubs during the mid-season transfer window.

Club	Player 1	Player 2	Player 3	AFC Player	Former players
Al-Ain	(Brazil) Caio Lucas	(Egypt) **Hussein El Shahat**	(Sweden) Marcus Berg	(Japan) Tsukasa Shiotani	(Brazil) Douglas
Al-Dhafra	(Brazil) Aílton	(Brazil) **Fernando Viana**	(Morocco) Issam El Adoua	(Uzbekistan) **Igor Sergeev**	(Iraq) Mohannad Abdul-Raheem (Morocco) Adil Hermach
Al-Jazira	(Brazil) Romarinho	(Morocco) Mbark Boussoufa	(Oman) **Harib Al-Saadi**	(Oman) **Mohammed Al-Musalami**	(France) Lassana Diarra (Uzbekistan) Sardor Rashidov
Al-Nasr	(Brazil) Marcelo Cirino	(Brazil) **Wanderley**	(Morocco) Abdelaziz Barrada	(Lebanon) Joan Oumari	(Argentina) Mauro Zárate
Al-Wahda	(Argentina) Sebastián Tagliabúe	(Hungary) Balázs Dzsudzsák	(Morocco) Mourad Batna	(South Korea) Rim Chang-woo	
Al-Wasl	(Brazil) Caio Canedo	(Brazil) Fábio Lima	(Brazil) Ronaldo Mendes	(Australia) Anthony Caceres	
Ajman	(Brazil) Adeílson	(Burkina Faso) Bakare Kone	(Mali) Modibo Maïga	(Uzbekistan) Azizbek Haydarov	
Dibba Al-Fujairah	(Brazil) **Diogo Acosta**	(Brazil) **Rodolfo**	(Morocco) Driss Fettouhi	(Jordan) Yaseen Al-Bakhit	(Brazil) Ciel (Senegal) Alassane Diallo
Emirates	(Argentina) Sebastián Sáez	(Morocco) Abdelghani Mouaoui	(South Korea) Park Jong-woo	(Ba'athist Syria) **Youssef Kalfa**	(Argentina) Sebastián Leto
Hatta	(Brazil) Fernando Gabriel	(Brazil) Samuel	(Romania) Adrian Ropotan	(Ba'athist Syria) Omar Midani	
Shabab Al-Ahli	(Croatia) **Ante Erceg**	(Moldova) Henrique Luvannor	(Senegal) Makhete Diop	(South Korea) Moon Chang-jin	(Argentina) Tomás De Vincenti (Senegal) Moussa Sow
Sharjah	(Brazil) **Lulinha**	(Brazil) Vander Vieira	(Brazil) Welliton	(Uzbekistan) **Otabek Shukurov**	(Australia) Ryan McGowan (Chile) César Pinares

== League table ==
Pos	Team	Pld	W	D	L	GF	GA	GD	Pts	Qualification
1	Al Ain (C)	22	16	5	1	65	23	+42	53	Qualification to the 2018 FIFA Club World Cup first round and the 2019 AFC Champions League group stage
2	Al Wahda	22	14	4	4	50	29	+21	46	Qualification to the 2019 AFC Champions League group stage
3	Al Wasl	22	12	5	5	42	27	+15	41	Qualification to the 2019 AFC Champions League group stage
4	Al Nasr	22	11	4	7	30	24	+6	37	Qualification to the 2019 AFC Champions League play-off round
5	Shabab Al Ahli	22	7	10	5	25	18	+7	31	
6	Sharjah	22	8	5	9	26	30	−4	29	
7	Al Jazira	22	7	7	8	34	36	−2	28	
8	Ajman	22	7	5	10	25	36	−11	26	
9	Dibba Al Fujairah	22	5	6	11	21	36	−15	21	
10	Al Dhafra	22	4	6	12	24	42	−18	18	
11	Emirates (Q)	22	4	5	13	20	39	−19	17	Qualified for the UAE Pro-League Play Off
12	Hatta (Q)	22	4	4	14	30	52	−22	16	Qualified for the UAE Pro-League Play Off

Updated to match(es) played on 2 March 2018. Source: AGLeague
Rules for classification: 1) points; 2) head-to-head points; 3) head-to-head goal difference; 4) head-to-head goals scored; 5) head-to-head away goals scored; 6) goal difference; 7) number of goals scored; 8) number of away goals scored; 9) fair play ranking 10) draw
(C) Champions; (Q) Qualified for the phase indicated

== Results ==
Home \ Away	AIN	DHA	JAZ	NAS	WAH	WAS	AJM	DAF	EMI	HAT	SAD	SHR
Al Ain		5–0	2–2	2–1	6–2	2–2	7–0	4–0	3–0	6–2	2–1	3–3
Al Dhafra	1–2		2–2	1–2	1–1	2–1	0–0	2–0	0–1	2–5	1–2	2–0
Al Jazira	2–3	3–1		2–4	2–4	0–0	2–1	2–2	3–1	2–1	0–0	3–1
Al Nasr	0–4	1–0	1–0		1–2	0–2	0–1	3–1	1–0	2–1	1–1	1–2
Al Wahda	0–1	1–1	4–1	1–0		4–3	2–3	5–0	2–1	3–1	0–0	3–0
Al Wasl	1–3	3–0	1–1	1–2	2–1		2–2	3–2	3–1	2–0	3–0	2–1
Ajman	2–3	3–1	1–1	0–1	2–2	0–2		2–1	3–2	1–0	1–3	0–1
Dibba Al Fujairah	0–0	1–1	1–0	0–2	1–3	2–0	2–0		1–0	2–2	0–1	1–1
Emirates	0–2	3–3	1–0	2–2	1–4	1–4	1–1	1–0		4–0	0–2	0–0
Hatta	0–3	1–2	2–3	1–5	0–1	2–2	1–0	1–2	2–2		1–1	3–1
Shabab Al Ahli	1–1	1–1	2–1	0–0	0–0	0–1	1–2	1–1	4–0	4–1		0–1
Sharjah	3–1	2–0	1–2	0–0	2–3	1–2	1–0	2–1	1–0	1–3	0–0	

Updated to match(es) played on 9 February 2018. Source: AGLeague
Legend: Blue = home team win; Yellow = draw; Red = away team win.

== Relegation play-offs ==
Because the League 2018–2019 season needs 14 teams, the bottom two teams of year and the 3rd and 4th place team of the 2nd division will have to face each other to see who will secure the final two spots this year.

=== First leg ===
9 May 2018

Fujairah	2–1	Hatta
	Report

Fujairah Club Stadium, Fujairah
9 May 2018

Al Hamriyah	0–0	Emirates
	Report

Al Hamriya Sports Club Stadium, Al Hamriyah

=== Second leg ===
14 May 2018

Hatta	0–1	Fujairah
	Report

Hamdan Bin Rashid Stadium, Hatta

Fujairah won 3–1 on aggregate.

14 May 2018

Emirates	1–0	Al Hamriyah
	Report

Emirates Club Stadium, Ras Al Khaimah

Emirates won 1–0 on aggregate.
