= Ajmani =

Ajmani is an Indian surname. Notable people with the surname include:

- Gulshan Ajmani, Indian politician
- Khamis Al-Ajmani (born 1982), Emirati footballer
- Shagun Ajmani (born 1991), Indian television actress and model
