= Obeid Rashid =

Emirati association football player (born 1997)

Obeid Rashid عبيد راشد
Personal information
- Full name: Obeid Rashid Salem Mohammed Al-Shahyari
- Date of birth: 1 May 1997 (age 29)
- Place of birth: Emirates
- Height: 1.86 m (6 ft 1 in)
- Position: Forward

Youth career
- –2018: Dibba Al-Fujairah

Senior career*
Years	Team	Apps	(Gls)
2018–2020	Dibba Al-Fujairah	1	(0)
2020–2022	Masafi		
2022–2024	Al Dhaid		
- * Club domestic league appearances and goals

Obeid Rashid (Arabic:عبيد راشد; born 1 May 1997) is an Emirati footballer. He currently plays as a forward.

== Career ==
Obeid Rashid started his career at Dibba Al-Fujairah and is a product of the Dibba Al-Fujairah's youth system. On 23 November 2018, Obeid Rashid made his professional debut for Dibba Al-Fujairah against Al-Sharjah in the Pro League, replacing Saeed Al-Naqbi . landed with Dibba Al-Fujairah from the UAE Pro League to the UAE First Division League in 2018-19 season.
