= Zayed Salem Saleh =

Emirati footballer (born 1991)

Zayed Salem Saleh زايد سالم صالح
Personal information
- Full name: Zayed Salem Saleh Al-Kathiri
- Date of birth: 25 April 1991 (age 35)
- Place of birth: Emirates
- Height: 1.72 m (5 ft 8 in)
- Position: Midfielder

Youth career
- 2005–2010: Al-Wahda

Senior career*
Years	Team	Apps	(Gls)
2010–2014	Al-Wahda	14	(0)
2015–2016	Dubai		
2016–2017	Al Urooba		
2017–2018	Khor Fakkan		
- * Club domestic league appearances and goals

Zayed Salem Saleh (Arabic: زايد سالم صالح) (born 25 April 1991) is an Emirati footballer. He currently plays as a midfielder .

== Career ==
He formerly played for Al-Wahda, Dubai, Al Urooba, and Khor Fakkan.
