= Abdulla Salem =

Emirati footballer (born 1983)

Personal information
- Full name: Abdulla Ahmad Salem Abdulla Saleh
- Date of birth: 18 March 1983 (age 43)
- Place of birth: Dubai, United Arab Emirates
- Height: 1.87 m (6 ft 1 1/2 in)
- Position: Defender

Youth career
- 1996–2007: Dubai

Senior career*
Years	Team	Apps	(Gls)
2007–2012	Al-Ahli		
2012	Al-Wahda		
2012–2018	Al-Sharjah		
2018	→ Ittihad Kalba (loan)		
2018–2019	Ittihad Kalba		
2019–2020	Al Urooba		

International career^{‡}
2003	FIFA World Youth Championship		
Medal record
Silver medal – second place	Arabian Gulf Cup	2014–2015
Winner	Etisalat Cup	2011–2012
Silver medal – second place	Etisalat Super Cup	2009
Gold medal – first place	Etisalat Pro League	2009
First place	Etisalat Super Cup	2008
Winner	President's Cup	2007–2008
Gold medal – first place	Armed Forces League	2003–2004
Gold medal – first place	Armed Forces Cup	2003–2004
Second place	Youth League Second Division	2001–2002
- * Club domestic league appearances and goals as of 22:30, 27 March 2016 (UTC) ‡ National team caps and goals as of 22:30, 27 March 2016 (UTC)

Abdulla Salem, born 18 March 1983 in Dubai, United Arab Emirates, is a professional football player. He currently plays has previously played for the United Arab Emirates national football team. He is a defender.

== Career ==
Season	Team	Position	Number
2013 to 2016	Al-Sharjah SCC	Defender	21
2012 to 2013	Al-Wahda F.C.	Defender	24
2007 to 2012	Al-Ahli Dubai F.C.	Defender	25
2003 to 2004	United Arab Emirates national football team	Defender	2
1996 to 2007	Dubai Cultural Sports Club	Defender	14
