= Mohammed Ismael =

Emirati footballer (born 1991)

Mohammed Ismael محمد إسماعيل
Personal information
- Full name: Mohammed Ismael Sayed Ali Al-Hosani
- Date of birth: 12 November 1991 (age 35)
- Place of birth: Emirates
- Height: 1.71 m (5 ft 7 in)
- Position: Right back

Team information
- Current team: Hatta
- Number: 88

Youth career
- –2011: Dubai

Senior career*
Years	Team	Apps	(Gls)
2011–2017	Dubai		
2017–2020	Shabab Al-Ahli	10	(0)
2020–2025	Ajman	89	(0)
2025–	Hatta	0	(0)
- * Club domestic league appearances and goals

Mohammed Ismael (Arabic:محمد إسماعيل) (born 12 November 1991) is an Emirati footballer who plays as a right back for Hatta.

== Career ==
=== Dubai ===
Mohammed Ismael started his career at Dubai and is a product of the Dubai's youth system. On 26 November 2011, Mohammed Ismael made his professional debut for Dubai against Al Wahda in the Pro League, replacing Hassan Mohammed.

=== Shabab Al-Ahli ===
He was playing with Dubai and after merging Al Ahli, Al-Shabab and Dubai clubs under the name Shabab Al-Ahli Club he was joined to Shabab Al-Ali. On 21 January 2018, Mohammed Ismael made his professional debut for Shabab Al-Ahli against Ajman in the Pro League.

=== Ajman ===
On 11 August 2020, he left Shabab Al-Ali and signed with Ajman.
