= Sultan Saif Salim =

Emirati association football player

Sultan Saif سلطان سيف
Personal information
- Full name: Sultan Saif Salim
- Date of birth: 10 October 1988 (age 38)
- Place of birth: Emirates
- Position: Defender

Senior career*
Years	Team	Apps	(Gls)
2008-2010	Al-Shaab		
2010-2013	Ittihd Kalba		
2013–2016	Dubai		
2016–2017	Al-Shaab		
2017–2021	Dibba Al-Hisn		
2021–2022	Al-Hamriyah		
- * Club domestic league appearances and goals

Sultan Saif Salim (Arabic:سلطان سيف سالم; born 7 May 1995) is an Emirati footballer. He currently plays as a defender.

== Career ==
He formerly played for Al-Shaab, Ittihd Kalba, Dubai, Dibba Al-Hisn, and Al-Hamriyah.
