= Ismael Ahmed (footballer, born 1989) =

Emirati association football player

Ismael Ahmed إسماعيل أحمد
Personal information
- Full name: Ismael Ahmed Ali Al-Bloushi
- Date of birth: 29 December 1989 (age 36)
- Place of birth: Emirates
- Height: 1.80 m (5 ft 11 in)
- Position: Defender

Youth career
- 2003–2008: Dubai

Senior career*
Years	Team	Apps	(Gls)
2008–2017	Dubai		
2016	→ Al-Shaab (loan)	11	(1)
2018–2020	Ajman	5	(0)
- * Club domestic league appearances and goals

Ismael Ahmed (Arabic:إسماعيل أحمد) (born 29 December 1989) is an Emirati footballer who plays as a defender.

== Career ==
Ismael Ahmed started his career at Dubai and is a product of the Dubai's youth system. and then he played with Al-Shaab.

=== Ajman ===
On 11 January 2018 signed with Ajman. On 21 April 2018, Ismail Ahmed made his professional debut for Ajman against Al-Wahda in the Pro League.
