= Ahmed Al-Yassi =

Emirati footballer (born 1988)

Personal information
- Full name: Ahmed Ibrahim Al-Yassi
- Date of birth: 31 July 1988 (age 38)
- Place of birth: United Arab Emirates
- Height: 1.73 m (5 ft 8 in)
- Position: Right back

Youth career
- Al Dhafra

Senior career*
Years	Team	Apps	(Gls)
2008–2011	Al Dhafra		
2011–2014	Ajman	55	(0)
2014–2019	Al Nasr	90	(1)
2019–2021	Khor Fakkan	13	(0)
2022–2023	Emirates		
- * Club domestic league appearances and goals

Ahmed Al-Yassi (Arabic: أحمد الياسي; born 31 July 1988) is an Emirati footballer who plays as a right back.
