= Gulshan Ajmani =

Indian politician

Gulshan Lal Ajmani

Member of the Bihar Legislative Assembly
- In office 1990–1995
- Constituency: Ranchi

Personal details
- Political party: Bharatiya Janata Party
- Spouse: Darshna Ajmani
- Children: 4

Gulshan Lal Ajmani is an Indian politician, son of the late Lala Ishwar Das Ajmani. He is a member of the Bharatiya Janata Party (BJP). He was a member of the Bihar Legislative Assembly in Ranchi (now in Jharkhand) from 1990 to 1995. He was also the president of the Chhotanagpur Chambers of Commerce and Industry and, under his presidency, it was reformed and re-recognized as the Federation of Jharkhand Chamber of Commerce and Industry. He is also the unbeaten president of Punjabi-Hindu Biradari of Jharkhand, since eight years.

He was jailed in 2015.

Ajmani is married to Darshna Ajmani and has four children.
