= Abdullah Nasser (footballer, born 1992) =

Emirati footballer

Personal information
- Full name: Abdullah Nasser Al-Qadomi
- Date of birth: 15 July 1992 (age 34)
- Place of birth: United Arab Emirates
- Height: 1.82 m (5 ft 11 1/2 in)
- Position: Defender

Youth career
- Al-Fujairah

Senior career*
Years	Team	Apps	(Gls)
2012–2014	Al-Fujairah		
2014–2015	Al-Jazira		
2015	→ Al-Wasl (loan)		
2015–2018	Dibba Al-Fujairah		
2019–2020	Dibba Al-Hisn		
2020–2022	Al-Taawon		
2022–2024	Al-Fujairah		
- * Club domestic league appearances and goals

Abdullah Nasser (Arabic:عبد الله ناصر; born 15 August 1992) is an Emirati footballer. He currently plays as a defender.
