= Saoud Faraj =

Emirati association football player (born 1991)

Saoud Faraj سعود فرج
Personal information
- Full name: Saoud Faraj Marzouq Al-Nuaimi
- Date of birth: 6 April 1991 (age 35)
- Place of birth: Emirates
- Height: 1.78 m (5 ft 10 in)
- Position: Winger

Youth career
- 2004–2010: Al-Jazira

Senior career*
Years	Team	Apps	(Gls)
2010–2013	Ittihad Kalba		
2013–2014	Al-Shaab		
2014–2015	Emirates Club		
2015–2016	Ittihad Kalba		
2016–2019	Ajman		
2019–2020	Al Bataeh		
2020–2021	Masfout		
2021	Al-Hamriyah		
- * Club domestic league appearances and goals

Saoud Faraj (Arabic:سعود فرج) (born 6 April 1991) is an Emirati footballer who plays as a winger f.

== Career ==
He formerly played for Al-Jazira, Ittihad Kalba, Al-Shaab, Emirates Club, Ajman, Al Bataeh, Masfout and Al-Hamriyah.
