= Yaqoub Al Hosani =

Emirati footballer (born 1987)

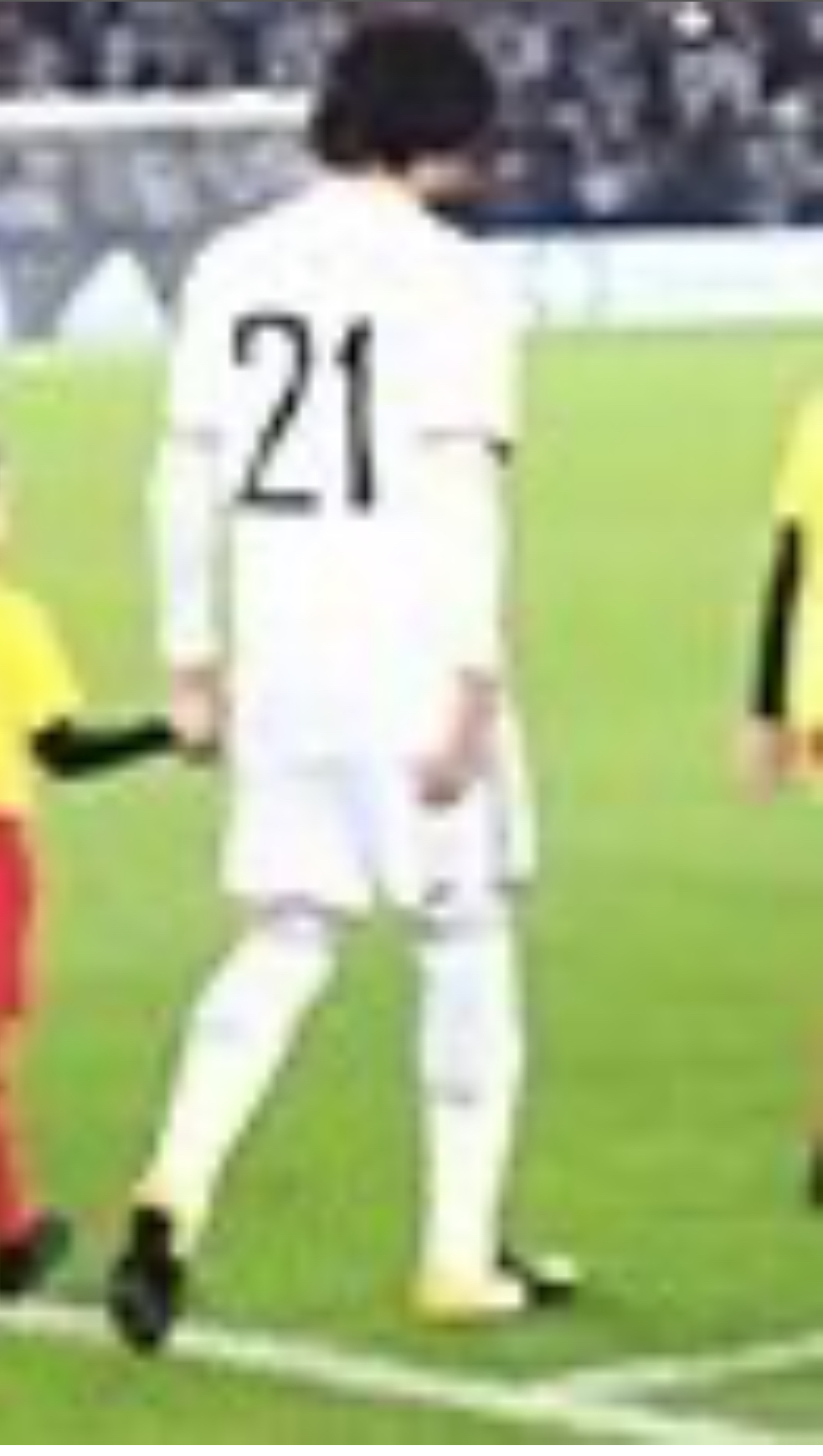

Personal information
- Full name: Yaqoub Yousef Matouq Mohamed Al Hosani
- Date of birth: 1 June 1987 (age 39)
- Place of birth: United Arab Emirates
- Height: 1.75 m (5 ft 9 in)
- Position: Midfielder

Youth career
- Al Dhafra

Senior career*
| Years | Team | Apps | (Gls) |
| 2007–2009 | Al Dhafra | - | (1) |
| 2009–2012 | Al-Wahda | 35 | (0) |
| 2012–2013 | Al Ain | 12 | (0) |
| 2013–2019 | Al Jazira | 68 | (1) |
| 2019–2021 | Ittihad Kalba | 20 | (0) |
| 2022 | Al-Arabi | | |
| 2022–2023 | Dibba Al-Hisn | | |
| 2023–2024 | Al Dhafra | | |
- * Club domestic league appearances and goals

Yaqoub Yousef Matouq Mohamed Al Hosani (Arabic:يعقوب الحوسني) (born 1 June 1987) is an Emirati footballer. He currently plays as a midfielder.
