= Khamis Al-Ajmani =

Emirati footballer (born 1982)

Personal information
- Full name: Khamis Ahmed Al-Ajmani
- Date of birth: 4 March 1982 (age 44)
- Place of birth: United Arab Emirates
- Height: 1.73 m (5 ft 8 in)
- Position: Right back

Senior career*
| Years | Team | Apps | (Gls) |
| 2003–2012 | Al-Sharjah | | |
| 2012–2014 | Al-Nasr | | |
| 2014–2015 | Al Ittihad | | |
| 2015–2017 | Hatta | | |
| 2017–2018 | Ras Al Khaima | | |
- * Club domestic league appearances and goals

Khamis Al-Ajmani (Arabic:خميس العجماني) (born 4 March 1982) is an Emirati footballer. He currently plays for Ras Al Khaima .
