= Mohammed Al-Dhahri =

Emirati footballer (born 1991)

Mohammed Al-Dhaheri
Personal information
- Full name: Mohammed Salem Ali Salem Al-Dhaheri
- Date of birth: 16 January 1991 (age 35)
- Place of birth: United Arab Emirates
- Height: 1.74 m (5 ft 8 1/2 in)
- Position: Left-back

Youth career
- Al Ain

Senior career*
| Years | Team | Apps | (Gls) |
| 2010–2015 | Al Ain | 18 | (0) |
| 2014–2015 | → Al Wasl (loan) | 4 | (0) |
| 2015–2018 | Al Wahda | 28 | (0) |
| 2017 | → Al Ain (loan) | 3 | (0) |
| 2018–2019 | Sharjah | 1 | (0) |
| 2019–2020 | Fujairah | 2 | (0) |
| 2020–2021 | Dibba Al-Fujairah | 2 | (0) |
| 2021–2022 | Masfout | 19 | (0) |
| 2022–2023 | Al Diwaniya | | |
- * Club domestic league appearances and goals

Mohammed Salem Al-Dhaheri (Arabic: محمد سالم علي سالم الظاهري; born 16 January 1991) is an Emirati professional footballer who plays as a left back. He became the first Emirati player to play in the Iraqi Premier League when he signed for Al Diwaniya in September 2022.
