= Hamdan Qassem =

Emirati footballer (born 1988)

Qassem Hamdan
Personal information
- Full name: Qassem Hamdan Jumaa Al-Bloushi
- Date of birth: 2 October 1988 (age 38)
- Place of birth: United Arab Emirates
- Height: 1.73 m (5 ft 8 in)
- Position: Left-back

Youth career
- Al-Ahli

Senior career*
Years	Team	Apps	(Gls)
2008–2010	Al-Ahli		
2010–2015	Al Shabab	35	(1)
2014–2015	→ Emirates Club (loan)	14	(0)
2015–2017	Al-Sharjah	8	(0)
2017	→ Dibba Al-Fujairah (loan)	9	(0)
2017–2018	Hatta	13	(0)
2018–2019	Al-Fujairah	9	(0)
2019–2021	Al Bataeh		
2021–2022	Dibba Al-Hisn		
- * Club domestic league appearances and goals

Hamdan Qassem (Arabic:حمدان قاسم) (born 2 October 1988) is an Emirati footballer. He currently plays as a left back.
