= Yousef Ahmed (footballer, born 1994) =

Emirati footballer

Personal information
- Full name: Yousef Ahmed Mousa Ahmed Ali Al Baloushi
- Date of birth: 27 April 1994 (age 32)
- Place of birth: Al Ain, United Arab Emirates
- Height: 1.72 m (5 ft 8 in)
- Position: Forward

Youth career
- Al Ain

Senior career*
Years	Team	Apps	(Gls)
2012–2018	Al Ain	26	(5)
2018–2022	Al-Wasl	17	(0)
2023–2024	Al Arabi		

International career^{‡}
2009–2013	UAE U20	0	(0)
2013–	UAE U23	0	(0)
- * Club domestic league appearances and goals as of 24 May 2013 ‡ National team caps and goals as of 6 January 2013

Yousef Ahmed Mousa Ahmed Ali Al Baloushi (Arabic: يوسف احمد موسى أحمد علي البلوشي; born 27 April 1994) commonly known as Yousef Ahmed, is an Emirati footballer who plays as a forward.

== Career statistics ==
=== Club ===
Club	League	Season	League		
Club	League	Season	Apps	Goals	Assists
Al Ain Reserve	Reserve League	2012–13	14	15	1
Total			14	15	1

==== Senior team ====
As of 24 May 2013

Club	Season	League			Cup			UPC			ACL			Total		
Club	Season	Apps	Goals	Assists	Apps	Goals	Assists	Apps	Goals	Assists	Apps	Goals	Assists	Apps	Goals	Assists
Al Ain	2012–13	6	2	0	3	3	1	1	0	0	3	1	0	13	6	1
Career total		6	2	0	3	3	1	1	0	0	3	1	0	13	6	1

== Honours ==
=== Club ===
Al Ain

- Arabian Gulf League: 1

2012–13

=== Individual ===
- Al Ain International Football Juniors Championship Top Goalscorer: 1

2011

- Young Player of the Year: 1

2012–13
