= Saeed Al-Naqbi =

Emirati association football player (born 1980)

Saeed Al-Naqbi سعيد النقبي
Personal information
- Full name: Saeed Mohammed Saeed Al-Naqbi
- Date of birth: 14 August 1980 (age 46)
- Place of birth: Emirates
- Height: 1.78 m (5 ft 10 in)
- Position: Defender

Youth career
- Dibba Al-Hisn

Senior career*
Years	Team	Apps	(Gls)
2003–2010	Dibba Al-Hisn		
2010–2018	Dibba Al-Fujairah		
2018–2019	Khor Fakkan		
2019–2021	Al Bataeh		
2021–2022	Masafi		
- * Club domestic league appearances and goals

Saeed Al-Naqbi (Arabic:سعيد النقبي) (born 14 August 1980) is an Emirati footballer. He currently plays as a defender.

== Career ==
He formerly played for Dibba Al-Hisn, Dibba Al-Fujairah, Khor Fakkan, Al Bataeh, and Masafi.
