= Dawoud Sulaiman =

Emirati footballer (born 1990)

Personal information
- Full name: Dawoud Sulaiman Ali Sulaiman Al Kuetei
- Date of birth: 21 February 1990 (age 36)
- Place of birth: Al Ain, UAE
- Height: 1.75 m (5 ft 9 in)
- Position: Goalkeeper

Senior career*
Years	Team	Apps	(Gls)
2010–2019	Al Ain	45	(0)
2015	→ Baniyas F.C. (loan)	0	(0)
- * Club domestic league appearances and goals as of 10:21, 28 October 2014 (UTC)

Dawoud Sulaiman Ali Sulaiman Al Kuetei (Arabic: داوود سليمان علي سليمان أل-كويتي; born 21 February 1990) is an Emirati professional footballer who plays as a goalkeeper.
