= Abdullah Malallah =

Emirati footballer

Personal information
- Full name: Abdullah Malallah Salem Bo Sumait
- Date of birth: 5 July 1983 (age 43)
- Place of birth: Ras Al Khaimah, United Arab Emirates
- Height: 1.78 m (5 ft 10 in)
- Position: Midfielder

Senior career*
Years	Team	Apps	(Gls)
2003–2008	Emirates		
2008–2013	Al Ain	32	(3)
2013–2014	Dubai	4	(0)
2014–2015	Al Wasl	15	(0)
2015–2016	Fujairah	30	(0)
2016–2020	Ajman	61	(2)
2020–2022	Emirates	26	(0)
2022–2024	Al Taawon	26	(0)

International career
2008–2009	United Arab Emirates	15	(1)
- * Club domestic league appearances and goals

Abdullah Malallah Salem Bo Sumait (born 5 July 1983) is an Emirati former professional footballer who plays as a midfielder.

== Career statistics ==
=== International ===
Appearances and goals by national team and year
National team	Year	Apps	Goals
United Arab Emirates	2008	11	1
United Arab Emirates	2009	4	0
Total		15	1

Scores and results list United Arab Emirates' goal tally first, score column indicates score after each Malallah goal.

List of international goals scored by Abdullah Mallalah
No.	Date	Venue	Opponent	Score	Result	Competition
1	19 March 2008	Sultan Qaboos Sports Complex, Muscat, Oman	Oman	1–1	1–1	Friendly
