= Eisa Ahmed =

Emirati footballer (born 1987)

Personal information
- Full name: Eisa Ahmed Abdulaziz Al-Marzouqi
- Date of birth: 13 January 1987 (age 39)
- Place of birth: United Arab Emirates
- Height: 1.75 m (5 ft 9 in)
- Position: Defender

Youth career
- Al Wahda

Senior career*
Years	Team	Apps	(Gls)
2007–2014	Al Wahda	96	(8)
2014–2017	Al Ahli	25	(1)
2017–2018	Al-Sharjah	17	(1)
2020–2021	Hatta	15	(0)
2021–2022	Masfout		

International career
2007–2014	United Arab Emirates		
- * Club domestic league appearances and goals

Eisa Ahmed (Arabic: عيسى أحمد; born 13 January 1987) is an Emirati footballer. He currently plays as a defender.
