= Dubai CSC =

Emirati football club

- Full name: Dubai Cultural Sports Club
- Founded: 1996
- Dissolved: July 2017 (merged with Al Shabab)
- Ground: Dubai Club Stadium; Dubai, UAE
- Capacity: 7,500

Dubai Cultural Sports Club (Arabic: نادي دبي الثقافي الرياضي), commonly referred to as Dubai Club, was a football club based in Dubai, United Arab Emirates.

In 2017, the club merged with Al Shabab Al Arabi Club and Al Ahli Club to create Shabab Al Ahli Club.

== History ==
The club was relegated in 2007 to the UAE Second Division and played three years in the league, before returning in 2010 to the UAE Pro League. Dubai CSC were to play Nottingham Forest in a pre-season friendly on 11 July 2013, the first time that they will have hosted a European club. The stadium has been recently refurbished and has full air conditioning.

== Achievements ==
- First Division League
  - Champions (1): 2003–04
- UAE Vice Presidents Cup
  - Winners (1): 2009–10

== Managers ==
- (Brazil) Ednaldo de Melo Patrício. Assistant coach Ricardo Barreto. Fitness coach Cláudio Café (10 July - 10 May)
- (Brazil) Junior dos Santos (October 2010–July 11)
- (Argentina) Néstor Clausen (15 July 2011 – 20 September 2011)
- (Switzerland) Umberto Barberis (caretaker) (2 September 2011 – 1 October 2011)
- (Romania) Marin Ion (3 October 2011 – 12 December 2011)
- (Egypt) Ayman Al-Ramadi (21 December 2011 – 1 June 2012)
- (France) René Marsiglia (1 July 2012 – 30 June 2013)
- (Switzerland) Martin Rueda (20 July 2013 – 5 November 2013)
- (Switzerland) Umberto Barberis (5 November 2013–?)
- (Tunisia) Chiheb Ellili (July 2014 – March 2015)
- (Romania) Marin Ion (April 2015 – December 2015)
- (Italy) Guglielmo Arena ( 1 July 2016 – 26 November 2016)
- (Egypt) Hany Ramzy (26 November 2016 – 16 May 2017)

== See also ==
- List of football clubs in the United Arab Emirates
