= 2015–16 Al Ain FC season =

Al Ain
2015–16 season
- President: Mohammed Bin Zayed
- Manager: Zlatko Dalić
- UAE Pro League: 2nd
- President's Cup: Runners-up
- League Cup: Group stage
- UAE Super Cup: Winners
- AFC Champions League: Runners-up
- Top goalscorer: League: Dyanfres Douglas (9 goals); All: Dyanfres Douglas (19 goals)
- Biggest win: Al Ain 4–0 Ittihad Kalba
- Biggest defeat: Al Ain 1–3 Dibba; Sharjah 3–2 Al Ain; Fujairah 3–2 Al Ain
Home colours	Away colours	Third colours

The 2015–16 season was Al Ain Football Club's 48th in existence and the club's 41st consecutive season in the top-level football league in the UAE.

== Club ==
=== Technical staff ===
Position	Name
Head coach	(Croatia) Zlatko Dalić
Assistant coach	(Croatia) Borimir Perković (Bosnia and Herzegovina) Anel Karabeg
Fitness coach	(Croatia) Frano Leko
Goalkeeping coach	(England) David Rouse
Club doctor	(Croatia) Jurica Rakic
Physiotherapist	(Croatia) Ivica Orsolic (Croatia) Marin Polonijo (Croatia) Bozo Sinkovic (Egypt) Abdul Nasser Al Juhani
Nutritionist	(Morocco) Mohsen Belhoz
U-21 team head coach	(Croatia) Joško Španjić
Team Manager	(United Arab Emirates) Matar Obaid Al Sahbani
Team Supervisor	(United Arab Emirates) Mohammed Obeid Hammad
Team Administrator	(United Arab Emirates) Essam Abdulla
Director of football	(United Arab Emirates) Sultan Rashed

Source: Al Ain Club

=== Board of directors ===
Office	Name
President; Honorary Board President	Mohammed Bin Zayed
First Deputy President; Honorary Board First Deputy President	Hazza Bin Zayed
Second Deputy President; Honorary Board Second Deputy President	Tahnoun bin Zayed
Chairman of Board of Directors	Abdullah bin Mohammed bin Khaled Al Nahyan
Vice Chairman of Board of Directors	Rashid bin Mubarak Al Hajri
Member of Board of Directors	Awad bin Hasom Al Darmaki
Member of Board of Directors	Mohammed Abdullah bin Bdouh
Member of Board of Directors	Mohammed bin Obaid Al Dhaheri

Source: 1

=== Kits ===
Home	Away	Third

Supplier: Nike / Sponsor: First Gulf Bank / Abu Dhabi Airports

== Players ==
=== First Team ===
No	Position	Nation	Player	Age	Since
12	GK	(United Arab Emirates)	Waleed Salem	36	2001
17	GK	(United Arab Emirates)	Khalid Eisa	27	2013
22	GK	(United Arab Emirates)	Mahmoud Almas	33	2011
5	DF	(United Arab Emirates)	Ismail Ahmed (3rd captain)	33	2008
15	DF	(United Arab Emirates)	Khaled Abdulrahman	28	2010
19	DF	(United Arab Emirates)	Mohanad Salem	31	2008
21	DF	(United Arab Emirates)	Fawzi Fayez	29	2009
23	DF	(United Arab Emirates)	Mohamed Ahmed	27	2012
50	DF	(United Arab Emirates)	Mohammed Fayez	27	2010
77	DF	(United Arab Emirates)	Mohamed Fawzi	26	2014
6	MF	(Brazil)	Fellipe Bastos	26	2015
7	MF	(United Arab Emirates)	Ali Al-Wehaibi	33	2001
8	MF	(United Arab Emirates)	Rashed Eisa	26	2014
10	MF	(United Arab Emirates)	Omar Abdulrahman (4th captain)	25	2008
13	MF	(United Arab Emirates)	Ahmed Barman	22	2013
16	MF	(United Arab Emirates)	Mohamed Abdulrahman	27	2008
18	MF	(United Arab Emirates)	Ibrahim Diaky (vice-captain)	34	2013
20	MF	(United Arab Emirates)	Helal Saeed (captain)	39	2011
29	MF	(South Korea)	Lee Myung-joo	26	2014
70	MF	(Colombia)	Danilo Asprilla	27	2016
99	MF	(United Arab Emirates)	Yasser Matar	31	2016
9	FW	(Brazil)	Dyanfres Douglas	28	2016
11	FW	(United Arab Emirates)	Saeed Al-Kathiri	28	2015

=== From Reserve U21 and Youth Academy ===
No	Position	Player	Nation
2	DF	UAE	Ali Moustafa
4	DF	UAE	Saeed Al-Menhali
14	MF	UAE	Souad Mosabeh
24	DF	UAE	Abdullah Ghamran
26	MF	UAE	Khaled Khalfan
27	MF	UAE	Mohsen Abdullah
30	MF	UAE	Abdulaziz Fayez
31	DF	UAE	Ahmed Salem
34	MF	UAE	Khalifa Salem
35	FW	UAE	Yousef Ahmed
37	DF	UAE	Rashed Muhayer
40	GK	UAE	Mohammed Abo Sandah
43	MF	UAE	Rayan Yaslam
44	DF	UAE	Salem Al-Azizi
66	FW	UAE	Khalifa Al Wahshe
75	GK	UAE	Hamad Al Mansoori
79	MF	UAE	Hussain Abdullah

== Transfers ==
=== In ===
Date	Position	No.	Name	From	Type	Transfer window	Fee	Team	Ref.
1 July 2015	DF	—	(United Arab Emirates) Mohammed Ayed	(United Arab Emirates) Al Shabab	Loan return	Summer		First team	
1 July 2015	FW	—	(United Arab Emirates) Faraj Jumaa	(United Arab Emirates) Al Shaab	Loan return	Summer		First team	
1 July 2015	FW	—	(United Arab Emirates) Haddaf Abdullah	(United Arab Emirates) Ajman	Loan return	Summer		First team	
1 July 2015	FW	11	(United Arab Emirates) Abdulaziz Fayez	(United Arab Emirates) Al Wasl	Loan return	Summer		First team	
1 July 2015	MF	25	(United Arab Emirates) Ahmed Al Shamisi	(United Arab Emirates) Al Wasl	Loan return	Summer		First team	
1 July 2015	MF	27	(United Arab Emirates) Salem Abdullah	(United Arab Emirates) Al Wasl	Loan return	Summer		First team	
1 July 2015	DF	33	(United Arab Emirates) Mohammed Al-Dhahri	(United Arab Emirates) Al Wasl	Loan return	Summer		First team	
1 July 2015	DF	31	(United Arab Emirates) Hazza Salem	(United Arab Emirates) Al Wasl	Loan return	Summer		First team	
1 July 2015	FW	49	(Netherlands) Ryan Babel	(Turkey) Kasımpaşa	Transfer	Summer	€2,500,000	First team	
8 July 2015	MF	6	(Brazil) Fellipe Bastos	(Brazil) Vasco da Gama	Transfer	Summer	Undisclosed	First team	
29 July 2015	MF	8	(United Arab Emirates) Rashed Eisa	(United Arab Emirates) Al-Wasl	Transfer	Summer	Undisclosed	First team	
4 January 2016	MF	70	(Colombia) Danilo Asprilla	(Bulgaria) Litex Lovech	Transfer	Winter	€2,500,000	First team	
12 January 2016	FW	9	(Brazil) Dyanfres Douglas	(Japan) Tokushima Vortis	Transfer	Winter	€3,900,000	First team	
23 January 2016	MF	99	(United Arab Emirates) Yasser Matar	(United Arab Emirates) Al Jazira	Transfer	Winter	Free	First team	

=== Loans in ===
No.	Pos	Player	From	Transfer window	Start date	End date	Fee	Team	Ref.
9	FW	(Nigeria) Emmanuel Emenike	(Turkey) Fenerbahçe	Summer	10 July 2015	End of Season	€3,500,000	First team	

=== Out ===
Date	Pos	No.	Name	To	Type	T.window	Fee	Team	Ref.
6 April 2015	FW	—	(Ivory Coast) Jumaa Saeed	(Kuwait) Al Salmiya	Transfer	Summer	€1,100,000	First team	
8 June 2015	MF	30	(United Arab Emirates) Mohammed Al Saadi	(United Arab Emirates) Al Shaab	Transfer	Summer	Undisclosed	First team	
29 June 2015	DF	31	(United Arab Emirates) Hazza Salem	(United Arab Emirates) Al Wasl	Transfer	Summer	Undisclosed	First team	
1 July 2015	DF	—	(United Arab Emirates) Mohammed Ayed	(United Arab Emirates) Al Shabab	Transfer	Summer	Undisclosed	First team	
1 July 2015	MF	51	(United Arab Emirates) Abdulrahman Ahmed	Free agent	End of contract	Summer		Reserve U21	
1 July 2015	MF	27	(United Arab Emirates) Salem Abdullah	(United Arab Emirates) Al Wasl	Transfer	Summer	Undisclosed	First team	
1 July 2015	MF	6	(Slovakia) Miroslav Stoch	(Turkey) Fenerbahçe	End of loan	Summer		First team	
1 July 2015	DF	44	(United Arab Emirates) Fares Jumaa	(United Arab Emirates) Al Jazira	End of contract	Summer	Free transfer	First team	
5 July 2015	DF	33	(United Arab Emirates) Mohammed Al-Dhahri	(United Arab Emirates) Al Wahda	Transfer	Summer	Undisclosed	First team	
7 July 2015	FW	3	(Ghana) Asamoah Gyan	(China) Shanghai Port	Transfer	Summer	€9,000,000	First team	
20 July 2015	FW	—	(United Arab Emirates) Haddaf Abdullah	(United Arab Emirates) Al Dhafra	Transfer	Summer	Undisclosed	First team	
19 August 2015	FW	9	(France) Kembo Ekoko	(United Arab Emirates) Al Nasr	Transfer	Summer	Undisclosed	First team	
13 January 2016	FW	9	(Nigeria) Emmanuel Emenike	(Turkey) Fenerbahçe	Loan termination	Winter		First team	

=== Loans out ===
No.	Pos	Name	To	Transfer window	Start date	End date	Fee	Team	Ref.
—	FW	(United Arab Emirates) Faraj Jumaa	(United Arab Emirates) Al Shaab	Summer	21 July 2015	End of Season	Undisclosed	Reserve U21	
37	DF	(United Arab Emirates) Rashed Muhayer	(United Arab Emirates) Al Wasl	Winter	28 December 2015	End of Season	Undisclosed	Reserve U21	

== Competitions ==
=== Overview ===
Competition	First match	Last match	Starting round	Final position	Record							
Competition	First match	Last match	Starting round	Final position	Pld	W	D	L	GF	GA	GD	Win %
Pro League	21 August 2015	8 May 2016	Matchday 1	2nd	26	18	3	5	53	24	+29	69.23
President's Cup	27 February 2016	29 May 2016	Round of 16	Runners-up	4	3	0	1	12	5	+7	75.00
League Cup	28 August 2015	16 November 2015	Group stage	Group stage	6	1	3	2	7	9	−2	16.67
UAE Super Cup	15 August 2015		Final	Winners	1	1	0	0	4	2	+2	100.00
AFC Champions League	24 February 2016	26 November 2016	Group stage	Runners-up	14	6	5	3	19	13	+6	42.86
Total					51	29	11	11	95	53	+42	56.86

Last updated: 26 November 2016
Source: Soccerway

=== UAE Pro-League ===
==== League table ====
Pos	Team	Pld	W	D	L	GF	GA	GD	Pts	Qualification or relegation
1	Al-Ahli (C)	26	21	3	2	60	20	+40	66	Qualification to the 2017 AFC Champions League group stage
2	Al-Ain	26	18	3	5	53	24	+29	57	Qualification to the 2017 AFC Champions League group stage
3	Al-Wahda	26	13	4	9	45	28	+17	43	Qualification to the 2017 AFC Champions League play-off round and the 2016–17 Arab Club Championship Group Stage
4	Al-Nasr	26	11	8	7	47	36	+11	41	
5	Al-Shabab	26	11	7	8	34	27	+7	40	

Updated to match(es) played on 8 May 2016. Source: UAE League
Rules for classification: 1) points; 2) goal difference; 3) number of goals scored.
(C) Champions

==== Results by round ====
Round	1	2	3	4	5	6	7	8	9	10	11	12	13	14	15	16	17	18	19	20	21	22	23	24	25	26
Ground	H	A	H	A	H	A	H	A	A	H	A	H	A	A	H	A	H	A	H	A	H	H	A	H	A	H
Result	W	W	W	L	W	W	W	W	W	W	W	W	W	W	W	L	W	W	L	W	W	D	L	W	L	D
Position	3	2	2	2	1	1	1	1	1	1	1	1	1	1	1	1	1	1	2	2	2	2	2	2	2	2

Updated to match(es) played on 8 May 2016. Source: UAE Pro League
A = Away; H = Home; W = Win; D = Draw; L = Loss

==== Results summary ====
Overall								Home						Away					
Pld	W	D	L	GF	GA	GD	Pts	W	D	L	GF	GA	GD	W	D	L	GF	GA	GD
26	18	3	5	53	24	+29	57	10	2	1	27	9	+18	8	1	4	26	15	+11

Last updated: 8 May 2016.
Source: AGLeague

==== Matches ====
21 August 2015 1	Al Ain	3–1	Al Dhafra	Al Ain
18:00 GMT+4 (UAE Time)	Myung-Joo 27'; Al-Kathiri 29'; R. Eisa 86'	Report	H. Al-Ahbabi 91'	Stadium: Hazza bin Zayed; Referee: Ammar Al-Jeneibi

13 September 2015 2	Al Wasl	0–2	Al Ain	Dubai
20:30 GMT+4 (UAE Time)		Report	Emenike 47', 63'	Stadium: Zabeel; Referee: Adel Al Naqbi

21 September 2015 3	Al Ain	2–1	Sharjah	Al Ain
17:30 GMT+4 (UAE Time)	R. Eisa 6'; Babel 25'	Report	Cajá 94'	Stadium: Hazza bin Zayed; Referee: Hamad Ali

26 September 2015 4	Al Wahda	2–1	Al Ain	Abu Dhabi
20:15 GMT+4 (UAE Time)	Tagliabúe 18', 56'	Report	Emenike 65'	Stadium: Al Nahyan; Referee: Adel Al Naqbi

17 October 2015 5	Al Ain	1–0	Dibba	Al Ain
17:05 GMT+4 (UAE Time)	Najjarine 12' (o.g.)	Report		Stadium: Hazza bin Zayed; Referee: Fahad Al-Kassar

23 October 2015 6	Al Shabab	1–4	Al Ain	Dubai
20:00 GMT+4 (UAE Time)	Jô 38'	Report	O. Abdulrahman 2'; Bastos 21', 50'; Emenike 45' (pen.)	Stadium: Maktoum bin Rashid; Referee: Hamad Ali

30 October 2015 7	Al Ain	2–0	Al Jazira	Al Ain
20:00 GMT+4 (UAE Time)	Myung-Joo 53'; Bastos 93'	Report		Stadium: Hazza bin Zayed; Referee: Yaqoub Al Hammadi

22 November 2015 8	Baniyas	1–1	Al Ain	Abu Dhabi
19:30 GMT+4 (UAE Time)	F. Awana 63'	Report	Al-Kathiri 22'	Stadium: Baniyas; Referee: Yaqoub Al Hammadi

28 November 2015 9	Al Nasr	0–3	Al Ain	Dubai
19:30 GMT+4 (UAE Time)		Report	Al-Kathiri 27' (pen.); M. Fawzi 45+1'; Diaky 81'	Stadium: Al Maktoum; Referee: Ammar Al-Jeneibi

5 December 2015 10	Al Ain	3–0	Al Ahli	Al Ain
19:30 GMT+4 (UAE Time)	Bastos 19'; M. Abdulrahman 45+1'; Emenike 76'	Report		Stadium: Hazza bin Zayed; Referee: Ahmad Salem

11 December 2015 11	Al Shaab	2–4	Al Ain	Sharjah
16:45 GMT+4 (UAE Time)	N'dri 7'; El Solia 57'	Report	Diaky 13', 35'; Emenike 38' (pen.), 78' (pen.)	Stadium: Khalid bin Mohammed; Referee: Yaqoub Al Hammadi

20 December 2015 12	Al Ain	2–1	Fujairah	Al Ain
16:50 GMT+4 (UAE Time)	Diaky 22'; Myung-Joo 87'	Report	Mandanne 72'	Stadium: Hazza bin Zayed; Referee: Ahmed Essa

25 December 2015 13	Emirates	0–1	Al Ain	Ras Al Khaimah
16:45 GMT+4 (UAE Time)		Report	I. Ahmed 76'	Stadium: Emirates Club; Referee: Ahmed Al Alili

8 January 2016 14	Al Dhafra	1–2	Al Ain	Abu Dhabi
17:10 GMT+4 (UAE Time)	Khribin 57'	Report	Diaky 52'; Asprilla 90+3'	Stadium: Hamdan Bin Zayed; Referee: Hamad Ali

23 January 2016 15	Al Ain	3–0	Al Wasl	Al Ain
20:00 GMT+4 (UAE Time)	M. Abdulrahman 19'; Douglas 34'; Bastos 90+2'	Report		Stadium: Hazza bin Zayed; Referee: Hamad Ali

29 January 2016 16	Sharjah	3–2	Al Ain	Sharjah
17:15 GMT+4 (UAE Time)	Wanderley 17', 71'; Maicosuel 80'	Report	Diaky 58'; Al-Kathiri 79'	Stadium: Sharjah; Referee: Mohamed Obaid

5 February 2016 17	Al Ain	2–1	Al Wahda	Al Ain
20:00 GMT+4 (UAE Time)	Douglas 58'; O. Abdulrahman 75'	Report	Tagliabúe 43'	Stadium: Hazza bin Zayed; Referee: Mohammed Abdulla

12 February 2016 18	Dibba	0–1	Al Ain	Fujairah
17:20 GMT+4 (UAE Time)		Report	I. Ahmed 90'	Stadium: Fujairah; Referee: Adel Al Naqbi

18 February 2016 19	Al Ain	1–2	Al Shabab	Al Ain
20:15 GMT+4 (UAE Time)	Marzooq 1' (o.g.)	Report	Masoud 76'; D. Ali 90+2'	Stadium: Hazza bin Zayed; Referee: Sultan Al Marzouqi

6 March 2016 20	Al Jazira	1–3	Al Ain	Abu Dhabi
19:10 GMT+4 (UAE Time)	Mabkhout 37'	Report	Douglas 25' (pen.), 59', 78'	Stadium: Mohammed bin Zayed; Referee: Mohammed Abdulla

11 March 2016 21	Al Ain	4–2	Baniyas	Al Ain
17:40 GMT+4 (UAE Time)	Douglas 8', 37'; M. Abdulrahman 22'; Asprilla 92'	Report	F. Awana 79'; Al-Noubi 91'	Stadium: Hazza bin Zayed; Referee: Yaqoub Al Hammadi

10 April 2016 22	Al Ain	1–1	Al Nasr	Al Ain
20:30 GMT+4 (UAE Time)	Diaky 83'	Report	Sulaiman 52'	Stadium: Hazza bin Zayed; Referee: Hamad Ali

14 April 2016 23	Al Ahli	1–0	Al Ain	Dubai
20:30 GMT+4 (UAE Time)	Khalil 38'	Report		Stadium: Rashid; Referee: Sultan Al Marzouqi

24 April 2016 24	Al Ain	3–0	Al Shaab	Al Ain
18:00 GMT+4 (UAE Time)	Douglas 62', 84'; S. Saif 78' (o.g.)	Report		Stadium: Hazza bin Zayed; Referee: Khalid Najem

28 April 2016 25	Fujairah	3–2	Al Ain	Fujairah
18:00 GMT+4 (UAE Time)	Mandanne 17'; Jalal 62'; Eze 73'	Report	Al-Yamahi 85' (o.g.); Al-Kathiri 87'	Stadium: Fujairah; Referee: Adel Al Naqbi

8 May 2016 26	Al Ain	0–0	Emirates	Al Ain
19:35 GMT+4 (UAE Time)		Report		Stadium: Hazza bin Zayed; Referee: Mohammed Abdulla

=== UAE Super Cup ===
15 August 2015 Final	Al Ain	4–2	Al Nasr	Abu Dhabi
19:40 GMT+4 (UAE Time)	Emenike 3', 70'; I. Ahmed (yellow card) 36' (goal) 79'; M. Fayez 67'; M. Abdulrahman (yellow card) 82'	Report	Maroof 50' (yellow card) 52'; Renan (yellow card) 69'; R. Mohammed 93'	Stadium: Mohammed bin Zayed; Referee: Mohammed Abdulla

=== President's Cup ===
27 February 2016 Round of 16	Al Ain	4–0	Ittihad Kalba	Dubai
17:35 GMT+4 (UAE Time)	O. Abdulrahman 23' (yellow card) 45'; I. Ahmed (yellow card) 50'; Diaky 65'; Douglas 33', 75'	Report		Stadium: Zabeel

12 May 2016 Quarter-finals	Al Ain	4–2	Al Wasl	Abu Dhabi
19:40 GMT+4 (UAE Time)	Douglas 41', 69'; I. Ahmed (yellow card) 47'; O. Abdulrahman 94', 97'	Report	Salmeen 49'; Caio 87'	Stadium: Mohammed bin Zayed

21 May 2016 Semi-finals	Al Ain	3–2	Baniyas	Abu Dhabi
19:45 GMT+4 (UAE Time)	M. Abdulrahman 66' (yellow card) 90'; Asprilla 86'; Myung-joo 111'	Report	Belfodil 87'; A. Abdulrahman 49'	Stadium: Mohammed bin Zayed

29 May 2016 Final	Al Jazira	1–1 (a.e.t.) (6–5 p)	Al Ain	Abu Dhabi
18:20 GMT+4 (UAE Time)	Mabkhout 43' (pen.)	Report	M. Fayez (yellow card) 42'; Douglas 64'; O. Abdulrahman (yellow card) 65'; Myung-joo (yellow card) 87'	Stadium: Zayed Sports City
	Penalties
	Mabkhout (penalty missed); F. Jumaa (penalty scored); K. Mubarak (penalty scored); Jong-woo (penalty scored); Neves (penalty scored); A. Mousa (penalty scored); M. Jamal (penalty scored)		(penalty scored) Douglas; (penalty scored) O. Abdulrahman; (penalty missed) Asprilla; (penalty scored) R. Eisa; (penalty scored) I. Ahmed; (penalty scored) Myung-joo; (penalty missed) M. Salem

=== League Cup ===
==== Group stage ====
===== Group B =====
Team	Pld	W	D	L	GF	GA	GD	Pts
Al Shabab	6	4	1	1	12	8	+4	13
Al Wahda	6	2	4	0	11	8	+3	10
Dibba	6	3	1	2	13	12	+1	10
Al Ain	6	1	3	2	7	9	−2	6
Fujairah	6	1	3	2	10	10	0	6
Sharjah	6	1	2	3	12	15	−3	5
Al Jazira	6	0	4	2	10	13	−3	4

Source: Soccerway

28 August 2015 1	Al Jazira	2–2	Al Ain	Abu Dhabi
20:45 GMT+4 (UAE Time)	Vučinić 25'; Neves 45+4'	Report	Babel 65' (pen.); Al-Kathiri 74'	Stadium: Mohammed bin Zayed; Referee: Yaqoub Al Hammadi

4 September 2015 2	Al Ain	1–2	Al Shabab	Al Ain
20:30 GMT+4 (UAE Time)	Myung-joo 40'	Report	Jô 68', 86'	Stadium: Hazza bin Zayed; Referee: Sultan Al Marzouqi

9 October 2015 3	Al Wahda	0–0	Al Ain	Abu Dhabi
20:00 GMT+4 (UAE Time)		Report		Stadium: Al Nahyan; Referee: Ahmad Salem

5 November 2015 4	Al Ain	1–1	Sharjah	Al Ain
19:30 GMT+4 (UAE Time)	Al-Kathiri 73'	Report	Maicosuel 16'	Stadium: Hazza bin Zayed; Referee: Yahya Al Mulla

10 November 2015 5	Fujairah	1–2	Al Ain	Fujairah
19:30 GMT+4 (UAE Time)	M. Khamis 47'	Report	Bastos 35'; Al-Kathiri 48'	Stadium: Fujairah; Referee: Mohamed Obaid

16 November 2015 6	Al Ain	1–3	Dibba	Al Ain
16:45 GMT+4 (UAE Time)	Al-Kathiri 81'	Report	Al-Khodaim 51' (pen.); K. Ibrahim 62', 70'	Stadium: Hazza bin Zayed; Referee: Ahmed Essa

=== AFC Champions League ===
==== Group stage ====
===== Group D =====
Pos	Team	Pld	W	D	L	GF	GA	GD	Pts	Qualification	JSH	AIN	AHL	NSF
1	(Qatar) El Jaish	6	3	1	2	6	8	−2	10	Advance to knockout stage	—	2–1	1–4	1–0
2	(United Arab Emirates) Al-Ain	6	3	1	2	8	6	+2	10	Advance to knockout stage	1–2	—	1–0	2–0
3	(Saudi Arabia) Al-Ahli	6	3	0	3	10	7	+3	9		2–0	1–2	—	2–1
4	(Uzbekistan) Nasaf Qarshi	6	1	2	3	4	7	−3	5		0–0	1–1	2–1	—

Source: AFC
Rules for classification: Group stage tiebreakers

24 February 2016	Al-Ain (United Arab Emirates)	1–2	(Qatar) El Jaish	Hazza Bin Zayed Stadium, Al Ain
19:00 UTC+4	Douglas 65' (pen.)	Report	Hamdallah 9'; Romarinho 45'	Attendance: 8,226; Referee: Minoru Tōjō (Japan)

2 March 2016	El Jaish (Qatar)	2–1	(United Arab Emirates) Al-Ain	Abdullah bin Khalifa Stadium, Doha
18:30 UTC+3	Hamdallah 49'; Abubakar 79'	Report	Al-Kathiri 86'	Attendance: 6,470; Referee: Kim Sang-woo (South Korea)

16 March 2016	Al-Ain (United Arab Emirates)	1–0	(Saudi Arabia) Al-Ahli	Hazza Bin Zayed Stadium, Al Ain
19:10 UTC+4	O. Abdulrahman 71'	Report		Attendance: 12,473; Referee: Adham Makhadmeh (Jordan)

5 April 2016	Al-Ahli (Saudi Arabia)	1–2	(United Arab Emirates) Al-Ain	King Abdullah Sports City, Jeddah
20:25 UTC+3	Al-Amri 90+3'	Report	Douglas 25', 77'	Attendance: 13,608; Referee: Hettikamkanamge Perera (Sri Lanka)

19 April 2016	Nasaf Qarshi (Uzbekistan)	1–1	(United Arab Emirates) Al-Ain	Qarshi Markaziy Stadium, Qarshi
19:30 UTC+5	Karimov 1'	Report	Asprilla 32'	Attendance: 10,952; Referee: Kim Dong-jin (South Korea)

3 May 2016	Al-Ain (United Arab Emirates)	2–0	(Uzbekistan) Nasaf Qarshi	Hazza Bin Zayed Stadium, Al Ain
20:30 UTC+4	Asprilla 39'; Ahmed 90'	Report		Attendance: 8,163; Referee: Minoru Tōjō (Japan)

===== Knockout stage =====
====== Round of 16 ======
18 May 2016	Al-Ain (United Arab Emirates)	1–1	(Iran) Zob Ahan	Hazza Bin Zayed Stadium, Al Ain
19:40 UTC+4	Douglas 9'	Report	Abbasi 75'	Attendance: 10,708; Referee: Kim Sang-woo (South Korea)

25 May 2016	Zob Ahan (Iran)	0–2	(United Arab Emirates) Al-Ain	Foolad Shahr Stadium, Isfahan
20:45 UTC+4:30		Report	Lee Myung-joo 12'; Asprilla 62'	Attendance: 9,960; Referee: Kim Jong-hyeok (South Korea)

====== Quarter-finals ======
23 August 2016	Al-Ain (United Arab Emirates)	0–0	(Uzbekistan) Lokomotiv Tashkent	Hazza Bin Zayed Stadium, Al Ain
19:30 UTC+4		Report		Attendance: 15,733; Referee: Adham Makhadmeh (Jordan)

13 September 2016	Lokomotiv Tashkent (Uzbekistan)	0–1	(United Arab Emirates) Al-Ain	Bunyodkor Stadium, Tashkent
19:00 UTC+5		Report	Caio 38'	Attendance: 7,661; Referee: Muhammad Taqi (Singapore)

====== Semi-finals ======
27 September 2016	Al-Ain (United Arab Emirates)	3–1	(Qatar) El Jaish	Hazza Bin Zayed Stadium, Al Ain
18:50 UTC+4	Douglas 17'; O. Abdulrahman 22'; Caio 90+1'	Report	Rashidov 52' (pen.)	Attendance: 15,067; Referee: Peter Green (Australia)

18 October 2016	El Jaish (Qatar)	2–2	(United Arab Emirates) Al-Ain	Abdullah bin Khalifa Stadium, Doha
18:15 UTC+3	Romarinho 67', 81'	Report	O. Abdulrahman 57'; M. Abdulrahman 90+3'	Attendance: 5,105; Referee: Fahad Al-Mirdasi (Saudi Arabia)

====== Final ======
19 November 2016	Jeonbuk Hyundai Motors (South Korea)	2–1	(United Arab Emirates) Al-Ain	Jeonju World Cup Stadium, Jeonju
19:00 UTC+9	Leonardo 70', 77' (pen.)	Report	Asprilla 63'	Attendance: 36,158; Referee: Ahmed Al-Kaf (Oman)

26 November 2016	Al-Ain (United Arab Emirates)	1–1	(South Korea) Jeonbuk Hyundai Motors	Hazza Bin Zayed Stadium, Al Ain
18:25 UTC+4	Lee Myung-joo 34'	Report	Han Kyo-won 30'	Attendance: 23,239; Referee: Ryuji Sato (Japan)

== Statistics ==
=== Squad appearances and goals ===
Last updated on 26 November 2016.

No.	Pos	Nat	Player	Total		Pro League		League Cup		President's Cup		Super Cup		Champions League	
No.	Pos	Nat	Player	Apps	Goals	Apps	Goals	Apps	Goals	Apps	Goals	Apps	Goals	Apps	Goals
Goalkeepers
12	GK	(United Arab Emirates) UAE	Waleed Salem	0	0	0	0	0	0	0	0	0	0	0	0
17	GK	(United Arab Emirates) UAE	Khalid Eisa	43	0	24	0	0	0	4	0	1	0	14	0
22	GK	(United Arab Emirates) UAE	Mahmoud Almas	8	0	2	0	6	0	0	0	0	0	0	0
36	GK	(United Arab Emirates) UAE	Dawoud Sulaiman	0	0	0	0	0	0	0	0	0	0	0	0
40	GK	(United Arab Emirates) UAE	Mohammed Abo Sandah	0	0	0	0	0	0	0	0	0	0	0	0
75	GK	(United Arab Emirates) UAE	Hamad Al Mansoori	0	0	0	0	0	0	0	0	0	0	0	0
Defenders
2	DF	(United Arab Emirates) UAE	Ali Moustafa	0	0	0	0	0	0	0	0	0	0	0	0
4	DF	(United Arab Emirates) UAE	Saeed Al-Menhali	19	0	7+2	0	1+1	0	1+2	0	0	0	3+2	0
5	DF	(United Arab Emirates) UAE	Ismail Ahmed	38	4	21	2	0	0	3	0	1	1	13	1
15	DF	(United Arab Emirates) UAE	Khaled Abdulrahman	9	0	2+1	0	5	0	0+1	0	0	0	0	0
19	DF	(United Arab Emirates) UAE	Mohanad Salem	40	0	21+1	0	0	0	3	0	1	0	14	0
21	DF	(United Arab Emirates) UAE	Fawzi Fayez	18	0	3	0	6	0	1+1	0	0	0	6+1	0
23	DF	(United Arab Emirates) UAE	Mohamed Ahmed	29	0	12+4	0	0	0	4	0	0	0	8+1	0
24	DF	(United Arab Emirates) UAE	Abdullah Ghamran	1	0	0+1	0	0	0	0	0	0	0	0	0
31	DF	(United Arab Emirates) UAE	Ahmed Salem	1	0	0	0	0+1	0	0	0	0	0	0	0
37	DF	(United Arab Emirates) UAE	Rashed Muhayer	6	0	0	0	6	0	0	0	0	0	0	0
44	DF	(United Arab Emirates) UAE	Salem Al-Azizi	7	0	1	0	6	0	0	0	0	0	0	0
50	DF	(United Arab Emirates) UAE	Mohammed Fayez	35	1	19	0	0	0	3	0	1	1	11+1	0
77	DF	(United Arab Emirates) UAE	Mohamed Fawzi	25	1	19	1	0	0	1+1	0	1	0	1+2	0
Midfielders
6	MF	(United Arab Emirates) UAE	Amer Abdulrahman	4	0	0	0	0	0	0	0	0	0	4	0
6	MF	(Brazil) BRA	Fellipe Bastos	39	6	23	5	4+1	1	1+1	0	1	0	7+1	0
7	MF	(Brazil) BRA	Caio Lucas	6	2	0	0	0	0	0	0	0	0	6	2
8	MF	(United Arab Emirates) UAE	Rashed Eisa	26	2	7+10	2	2+1	0	1+2	0	0+1	0	0+2	0
10	MF	(United Arab Emirates) UAE	Omar Abdulrahman	42	8	21+1	2	1	0	4	3	1	0	14	3
13	MF	(United Arab Emirates) UAE	Ahmed Barman	28	1	12+2	1	0	0	3	0	0	0	7+4	0
14	MF	(United Arab Emirates) UAE	Souad Mosabeh	0	0	0	0	0	0	0	0	0	0	0	0
16	MF	(United Arab Emirates) UAE	Mohamed Abdulrahman	38	5	14+7	3	0	0	3	1	0+1	0	9+4	1
18	MF	(United Arab Emirates) UAE	Ibrahim Diaky	42	8	11+12	7	5	0	1+2	1	1	0	1+9	0
20	MF	(United Arab Emirates) UAE	Helal Saeed	16	0	3+5	0	2+1	0	0+1	0	0+1	0	0+3	0
26	MF	(United Arab Emirates) UAE	Khaled Khalfan	2	0	0+1	0	0+1	0	0	0	0	0	0	0
27	MF	(United Arab Emirates) UAE	Mohsen Abdullah	3	0	0+2	0	0+1	0	0	0	0	0	0	0
29	MF	(South Korea) KOR	Lee Myung-joo	48	7	23	3	6	1	4	1	1	0	14	2
30	MF	(United Arab Emirates) UAE	Abdulaziz Fayez	2	0	0	0	0+2	0	0	0	0	0	0	0
34	MF	(United Arab Emirates) UAE	Khalifa Salem	0	0	0	0	0	0	0	0	0	0	0	0
43	MF	(United Arab Emirates) UAE	Rayan Yaslam	6	0	0	0	2+4	0	0	0	0	0	0	0
49	MF	(Netherlands) NED	Ryan Babel	14	2	5+3	1	4+1	1	0	0	1	0	0	0
70	MF	(Colombia) COL	Danilo Asprilla	25	7	7+3	2	0	0	3	1	0	0	9+3	4
79	MF	(United Arab Emirates) UAE	Hussain Abdullah	2	0	0	0	2	0	0	0	0	0	0	0
99	MF	(United Arab Emirates) UAE	Yasser Matar	6	0	3+2	0	0	0	0	0	0	0	1	0
Forwards
9	FW	(Brazil) BRA	Dyanfres Douglas	28	19	10	9	0	0	4	5	0	0	12+2	5
11	FW	(United Arab Emirates) UAE	Saeed Al-Kathiri	30	10	5+16	5	4+2	4	0	0	0	0	0+3	1
35	FW	(United Arab Emirates) UAE	Yousef Ahmed	2	0	0+2	0	0	0	0	0	0	0	0	0
66	FW	(United Arab Emirates) UAE	Khalifa Al Wahshe	1	0	0	0	0+1	0	0	0	0	0	0	0
Players transferred out during the season
9	FW	(Nigeria) NGR	Emmanuel Emenike	15	9	11	7	3	0	0	0	1	2	0	0

=== Goalscorers ===
As of 26 November 2016

Includes all competitive matches. The list is sorted alphabetically by surname when total goals are equal.

Rank	No.	Pos.	Player	Pro League	President's Cup	League Cup	Super Cup	Champions League	Total
1	9	FW	(Brazil) Dyanfres Douglas	9	5	0	0	5	19
2	11	FW	(United Arab Emirates) Saeed Al-Kathiri	5	0	4	0	1	10
3	9	FW	(Nigeria) Emmanuel Emenike	7	0	0	2	0	9
4	18	MF	(United Arab Emirates) Ibrahim Diaky	7	1	0	0	0	8
4	10	MF	(United Arab Emirates) Omar Abdulrahman	2	3	0	0	3	8
6	70	MF	(Colombia) Danilo Asprilla	2	1	0	0	4	7
6	29	MF	(South Korea) Lee Myung-joo	3	1	1	0	2	7
8	6	MF	(Brazil) Fellipe Bastos	5	0	1	0	0	6
9	16	MF	(United Arab Emirates) Mohamed Abdulrahman	3	1	0	0	1	5
10	5	DF	(United Arab Emirates) Ismail Ahmed	2	0	0	1	1	4
11	49	FW	(Netherlands) Ryan Babel	1	0	1	0	0	2
11	8	MF	(United Arab Emirates) Rashed Eisa	2	0	0	0	0	2
11	7	MF	(Brazil) Caio Lucas	0	0	0	0	2	2
14	77	DF	(United Arab Emirates) Mohamed Fawzi	1	0	0	0	0	1
14	50	DF	(United Arab Emirates) Mohammed Fayez	0	0	0	1	0	1
Own goals				4	0	0	0	0	4
Totals				53	12	7	4	19	95

=== Disciplinary record ===
N	P	Nat.	Name	Pro League			League Cup			President's Cup			Super Cup			Champions League			Total			Notes
N	P	Nat.	Name	Yellow card	Second yellow card	Red card	Yellow card	Second yellow card	Red card	Yellow card	Second yellow card	Red card	Yellow card	Second yellow card	Red card	Yellow card	Second yellow card	Red card	Yellow card	Second yellow card	Red card	Notes
10	MF	(United Arab Emirates)	Omar Abdulrahman	5						2						2			9			
16	MF	(United Arab Emirates)	Mohamed Abdulrahman	5						1			1			2			9			
5	DF	(United Arab Emirates)	Ismail Ahmed	3						2			1			1			7			
19	DF	(United Arab Emirates)	Mohanad Salem	4												2			6			
6	MF	(Brazil)	Fellipe Bastos	3			2									1			6			
29	MF	(South Korea)	Lee Myung-joo	2						1						2			5			
50	DF	(United Arab Emirates)	Mohammed Fayez	1						1						3			5			
77	DF	(United Arab Emirates)	Mohamed Fawzi	4			1												5			
18	MF	(United Arab Emirates)	Ibrahim Diaky	2												1			3			
23	DF	(United Arab Emirates)	Mohamed Ahmed	2												1			3			
21	DF	(United Arab Emirates)	Fawzi Fayez				1									1			2			
9	FW	(Nigeria)	Emmanuel Emenike	1			1												2			
8	MF	(United Arab Emirates)	Rashed Eisa	2			1												3			
13	MF	(United Arab Emirates)	Ahmed Barman	1	1														1	1		
70	MF	(Colombia)	Danilo Asprilla													2			2			
4	DF	(United Arab Emirates)	Saeed Al-Menhali	2															2			
49	FW	(Netherlands)	Ryan Babel			1	1												1		1	
43	MF	(United Arab Emirates)	Rayan Yaslam				1												1			
17	GK	(United Arab Emirates)	Khalid Eisa	1															1			
9	FW	(Brazil)	Dyanfres Douglas	1															1			
99	MF	(United Arab Emirates)	Yasser Matar	1															1			
11	FW	(United Arab Emirates)	Saeed Al-Kathiri													1			1			
15	DF	(United Arab Emirates)	Khaled Abdulrahman				1												1			

Last updated: 26 November 2016
Source: UAEProLeague.ae, AlAinClub.ae, The-Afc.com
Only competitive matches
(yellow card) = Number of bookings; (second yellow card) = Number of sending offs after a second yellow card; (red card) = Number of sending offs by a direct red card.

=== Assists ===
No.	Player	Pro League	President's Cup	League Cup	Super Cup	Champions League	Total
10	(United Arab Emirates) Omar Abdulrahman	12	1	0	1	6	20
8	(United Arab Emirates) Rashed Eisa	0	2	1	0	1	4
9	(Brazil) Dyanfres Douglas	2	2	0	0	0	4
49	(Netherlands) Ryan Babel	2	0	1	1	0	4
70	(Colombia) Danilo Asprilla	1	1	0	0	1	3
23	(United Arab Emirates) Mohamed Ahmed	2	0	0	0	1	3
16	(United Arab Emirates) Mohamed Abdulrahman	3	0	0	0	0	3
29	(South Korea) Lee Myung-joo	2	0	0	0	0	2
9	(Nigeria) Emmanuel Emenike	1	0	1	0	0	2
11	(United Arab Emirates) Saeed Al-Kathiri	1	0	1	0	0	2
7	(Brazil) Caio Lucas	0	0	0	0	2	2
50	(United Arab Emirates) Mohammed Fayez	1	1	0	0	0	2
79	(United Arab Emirates) Husain Abdulla	0	0	1	0	0	1
5	(United Arab Emirates) Ismail Ahmed	0	0	0	0	1	1
6	(Brazil) Fellipe Bastos	0	0	0	1	0	1
4	(United Arab Emirates) Saeed Al-Menhali	0	1	0	0	0	1
77	(United Arab Emirates) Mohamed Fawzi	1	0	0	0	0	1
19	(United Arab Emirates) Mohanad Salem	1	0	0	0	0	1
35	(United Arab Emirates) Yousef Ahmed	1	0	0	0	0	1
Totals		30	8	5	3	12	58

=== Hat-tricks ===
Player	Against	Result	Date	Competition
(Brazil) Douglas	Al Jazira	1–3 (A)	6 March 2016	Pro League (Round 20)

=== Clean sheets ===
Rank	No.	Player	Pro-League	President's Cup	League Cup	Super Cup	Champions League	Total
1	17	(United Arab Emirates) Khalid Eisa	9	1	0	0	5	15
2	22	(United Arab Emirates) Mahmoud Almas	1	0	1	0	0	2
Totals			10	1	1	0	5	17
