= 2016–17 Al Ain FC season =

Al Ain
2016–17 season
- President: Mohammed Bin Zayed
- Manager: Zlatko Dalić (until 23 January); Joško Španjić (interim, from 23 January, until 1 February); Zoran Mamić (from 1 February)
- Stadium: Hazza Bin Zayed
- UAE Pro League: 4th
- President's Cup: Quarter-finals
- League Cup: Group stage
- AFC Champions League: Quarter-finals
Home colours	Away colours

The 2016–17 season was Al Ain Football Club's 49th in existence and the club's 42nd consecutive season in the top-level football league in the UAE.

== Club ==
=== Technical staff ===
Position	Name
Head coach	(Croatia) Zlatko Dalić
Assistant coach	(Croatia) Borimir Perković (Bosnia and Herzegovina) Anel Karabeg
Fitness coach	(Croatia) Frano Leko
Goalkeeping coach	(England) David Rouse
Club doctor	(Croatia) Jurica Rakic
Physiotherapist	(Croatia) Ivica Orsolic (Croatia) Marin Polonijo (Croatia) Bozo Sinkovic (Egypt) Abdul Nasser Al Juhani
Nutritionist	(Morocco) Mohsen Belhoz
U-21 team head coach	(Croatia) Joško Španjić
Team Manager	(United Arab Emirates) Matar Obaid Al Sahbani
Team Supervisor	(United Arab Emirates) Mohammed Obeid Hammad
Team Administrator	(United Arab Emirates) Essam Abdulla
Director of football	(United Arab Emirates) Sultan Rashed

Source: Al Ain Club

=== Board of directors ===
Office	Name
President	(United Arab Emirates) Mohammed Bin Zayed Al Nahyan
Vice President	(United Arab Emirates) Hazza Bin Zayed Al Nahyan
Chairman of Board of Directors	(United Arab Emirates) Ghanim Mubarak Al Hajeri
Vice Chairman of Board of Directors	(United Arab Emirates) Ahmed Humaid Al Mazrouie
Board of Directors Member	(United Arab Emirates) Mohammed Obaid Hammad
Board of Directors Member	(United Arab Emirates) Sultan Rashed
Board of Directors Member	(United Arab Emirates) Ali Msarri

Source: Al Ain Club

=== Kits ===
Home	Away	Third

Supplier: Nike / Sponsor: First Gulf Bank / Abu Dhabi Airports

On 22 August 2016, Al Ain unveil new Kit for season 2016–17. The away kit was reveal on 10 December.

== Players ==
=== First Team ===
No	Position	Nation	Player	Age	Since
12	GK	(United Arab Emirates)	Waleed Salem	36	2001
17	GK	(United Arab Emirates)	Khalid Eisa	27	2013
22	GK	(United Arab Emirates)	Mahmoud Almas	34	2011
36	GK	(United Arab Emirates)	Dawoud Sulaiman	27	2010
3	DF	(United Arab Emirates)	Dawood Ali	33	2017
5	DF	(United Arab Emirates)	Ismail Ahmed (vice-captain)	34	2008
14	DF	(United Arab Emirates)	Mohammed Al-Dhahri	26	2017
15	DF	(United Arab Emirates)	Khaled Abdulrahman	29	2010
19	DF	(United Arab Emirates)	Mohanad Salem	32	2008
21	DF	(United Arab Emirates)	Fawzi Fayez	30	2009
23	DF	(United Arab Emirates)	Mohamed Ahmed	28	2012
50	DF	(United Arab Emirates)	Mohammed Fayez (3rd captain)	27	2010
6	MF	(United Arab Emirates)	Amer Abdulrahman	28	2016
7	MF	(Brazil)	Caio Lucas	23	2016
10	MF	(United Arab Emirates)	Omar Abdulrahman (captain)	25	2008
13	MF	(United Arab Emirates)	Ahmed Barman	23	2013
16	MF	(United Arab Emirates)	Mohamed Abdulrahman	28	2008
18	MF	(United Arab Emirates)	Ibrahim Diaky	35	2013
29	MF	(South Korea)	Lee Myung-joo	27	2014
43	MF	(United Arab Emirates)	Rayan Yaslam	22	2014
70	MF	(Colombia)	Danilo Asprilla	28	2017
77	MF	(United Arab Emirates)	Bandar Al-Ahbabi	27	2016
9	FW	(Brazil)	Dyanfres Douglas	29	2016
11	FW	(United Arab Emirates)	Saeed Al-Kathiri	29	2015
20	FW	(Saudi Arabia)	Nasser Al-Shamrani	33	2017

=== From Reserve U21 and Youth Academy ===
No	Position	Player	Nation
40	GK	UAE	Mohammed Abo Sandah
75	GK	UAE	Hamad Al Mansoori
2	DF	UAE	Ali Moustafa
3	DF	UAE	Firas Al Khusaibi
4	DF	UAE	Saeed Al-Menhali
37	DF	UAE	Rashed Muhayer
31	DF	UAE	Ahmed Salem
44	DF	UAE	Salem Al-Azizi
59	DF	UAE	Saeed Juma
26	MF	UAE	Khaled Khalfan
27	MF	UAE	Mohsen Abdullah
28	MF	UAE	Sulaiman Nasser
30	MF	UAE	Mohammed Khalfan
71	MF	UAE	Abdullah Karama
79	MF	UAE	Hussain Abdullah
35	FW	UAE	Yousef Ahmed
52	FW	UAE	Ali Eid

== Transfers ==
=== In ===
Date	Position	No.	Name	From	Type	Transfer window	Fee	Team	Ref.
1 July 2016	DF	37	(United Arab Emirates) Rashed Muhayer	(United Arab Emirates) Al-Wasl	Loan return	Summer		First team	
1 July 2016	GK	36	(United Arab Emirates) Dawoud Sulaiman	(United Arab Emirates) Baniyas	Loan return	Summer		First team	
2 July 2016	MF	6	(United Arab Emirates) Amer Abdulrahman	(United Arab Emirates) Baniyas	Transfer	Summer	Undisclosed	First team	
2 July 2016	MF	7	(Brazil) Caio Lucas	(Japan) Kashima Antlers	Transfer	Summer	€3,000,000	First team	
20 October 2016	MF	77	(United Arab Emirates) Bandar Al-Ahbabi	(United Arab Emirates) Baniyas	Transfer	Summer	Undisclosed	First team	

=== Loans in ===
No.	Pos	Player	From	Transfer window	Start date	End date	Fee	Team	Ref.
20	FW	(Saudi Arabia) Nasser Al-Shamrani	(Saudi Arabia) Al Hilal	Winter	18 January 2017	End of Season	Undisclosed	First team	
14	DF	(United Arab Emirates) Mohammed Al-Dhahri	(United Arab Emirates) Al Wahda	Winter	21 January 2017	End of Season	Undisclosed	First team	
3	DF	(United Arab Emirates) Dawood Ali	(United Arab Emirates) Al Shabab	Winter	21 January 2017	End of Season	Undisclosed	First team	

=== Out ===
Date	Position	No.	Name	To	Type	T.window	Fee	Team	Ref.
1 July 2016	FW	11	(United Arab Emirates) Abdulaziz Fayez	Free agent	Contract expired	Summer		First team	
17 July 2016	MF	99	(United Arab Emirates) Yasser Matar	(United Arab Emirates) Fujairah	Contract termination	Summer		First team	
2 August 2016	DF	77	(United Arab Emirates) Mohamed Fawzi	(United Arab Emirates) Al Jazira	Transfer	Summer	Undisclosed	First team	
8 September 2016	FW	49	(Netherlands) Ryan Babel	(Spain) Deportivo La Coruña	Contract termination	Summer	Free transfer	First team	
12 January 2017	MF	8	(United Arab Emirates) Rashed Eisa	(United Arab Emirates) Al Shabab	Contract termination	Winter	Free transfer	First team	

=== Loans out ===
No.	Pos	Name	To	Transfer window	Start date	End date	Fee	Team	Ref.
6	MF	(Brazil) Fellipe Bastos	(United Arab Emirates) Baniyas	Summer	21 July 2016	End of Season	Undisclosed (Note: Option to buy at the end of the season)	First team	
39	MF	(United Arab Emirates) Saqer Mohammed	(United Arab Emirates) Ittihad Kalba	Summer	12 October 2016	End of Season	Undisclosed	Reserve U21	
24	DF	(United Arab Emirates) Abdullah Ghamran	(United Arab Emirates) Ittihad Kalba	Winter	5 January 2017	End of Season	Undisclosed	Reserve U21	

== Competitions ==
=== Overview ===
Competition	First match	Last match	Starting round	Final position	Record							
Competition	First match	Last match	Starting round	Final position	Pld	W	D	L	GF	GA	GD	Win %
Pro League	18 September 2016	13 May 2017	Matchday 1	4th	26	17	4	5	58	37	+21	65.38
President's Cup	26 December 2016	5 January 2016	Round of 16	Quarter-finals	2	1	0	1	3	2	+1	50.00
League Cup	2 September 2016	13 December 2016	Group stage	Group stage	6	2	2	2	12	15	−3	33.33
AFC Champions League	21 February 2017	11 September 2017	Group stage	Quarter-finals	10	4	4	2	20	12	+8	40.00
Total					44	24	10	10	93	66	+27	54.55

Last updated: 11 September 2017
Source: Soccerway

=== UAE Pro-League ===
==== League table ====
Pos	Team	Pld	W	D	L	GF	GA	GD	Pts	Qualification or relegation
2	Al Wasl	26	17	6	3	55	26	+29	57	Qualification to the 2018 AFC Champions League group stage
3	Al Ahli	26	16	8	2	50	18	+32	56	
4	Al Ain	26	17	4	5	58	37	+21	55	Qualification to the 2018 AFC Champions League play-off round
5	Al Wahda	26	10	9	7	54	40	+14	39	Qualification to the 2018 AFC Champions League group stage
6	Al Nasr	26	11	3	12	42	32	+10	36	

Source: uae.agleague.ae
Rules for classification: 1) points; 2) head-to-head points; 3) head-to-head goal difference; 4) head-to-head goals scored; 5) head-to-head away goals scored; 6) goal difference; 7) number of goals scored; 8) number of away goals scored; 9) fair play ranking 10) draw

==== Results by round ====
Round	1	2	3	4	5	6	7	8	9	10	11	12	13	14	15	16	17	18	19	20	21	22	23	24	25	26
Ground	H	H	H	A	A	H	A	H	A	H	A	H	A	A	A	A	H	H	A	H	A	H	A	H	A	H
Result	W	W	D	W	D	W	W	L	W	W	D	W	W	D	L	W	W	L	W	W	L	W	L	W	W	W
Position	6	2	3	4	5	4	1	3	5	3	4	3	3	2	3	2	2	4	3	3	4	3	4	4	4	4

Updated to match(es) played on 13 May 2017. Source: UAE Pro League
A = Away; H = Home; W = Win; D = Draw; L = Loss

==== Results summary ====
Overall								Home						Away					
Pld	W	D	L	GF	GA	GD	Pts	W	D	L	GF	GA	GD	W	D	L	GF	GA	GD
26	17	4	5	58	37	+21	55	10	1	2	31	15	+16	7	3	3	27	22	+5

Last updated: 13 May 2017.
Source: Soccerway

==== Matches ====
18 September 2016 1	Al Ain	1–0	Baniyas	Al Ain
20:15 GMT+4 (UAE Time)	Caio 70'	Report		Stadium: Hazza bin Zayed; Attendance: 3153; Referee: Abdulla Al Ajel

22 September 2016 2	Al Ain	5–2	Emirates	Al Ain
20:15 GMT+4 (UAE Time)	Douglas 20' (pen.), 22', 56'; Caio 24'; Asprilla 58'	Report	Sáez 29', 95'	Stadium: Hazza bin Zayed; Attendance: 3612; Referee: Mohammed Abdulla

23 October 2016 4	Al Nasr	1–2	Al Ain	Dubai
20:00 GMT+4 (UAE Time)	Barrada 21'	Report	Caio 8'; K. Jalal 23' (o.g.)	Stadium: Al Maktoum; Referee: Yaqoub Al Hammadi

28 October 2016 5	Dibba	2–2	Al Ain	Fujairah
16:55 GMT+4 (UAE Time)	Al-Dhanhani 70'; M. Salem 76' (o.g.)	Report	I. Ahmed 18'; Douglas 56'	Stadium: Fujairah; Referee: Hamad Ali

2 November 2016 6	Al Ain	2–1	Al Shabab	Al Ain
20:00 GMT+4 (UAE Time)	Caio 54'; Diaky 94'	Report	R. Hassan 81'	Stadium: Hazza bin Zayed; Referee: Mohammed Abdulla

30 November 2016 9	Al Dhafra	1–2	Al Ain	Abu Dhabi
19:30 GMT+4 (UAE Time)	Hermach 4'	Report	I. Ahmed 52'; O. Abdulrahman 81' (pen.)	Stadium: Hamdan Bin Zayed; Referee: Eisa Al Hajri

4 December 2016 10	Al Ain	2–1	Al Wasl	Al Ain
20:00 GMT+4 (UAE Time)	Douglas 58'; M. Salem 73'	Report	Lima 3' (pen.)	Stadium: Hazza bin Zayed; Referee: Mohammed Abdulla

9 December 2016 11	Al Wahda	1–1	Al Ain	Abu Dhabi
20:00 GMT+4 (UAE Time)	Dzsudzsák 26'	Report	Al-Kathiri 52'	Stadium: Al Nahyan; Referee: Sultan Al Marzouqi

17 December 2016 12	Al Ain	3–0	Sharjah	Al Ain
20:00 GMT+4 (UAE Time)	Caio 14'; O. Abdulrahman 70' (pen.); Diaky 93'	Report		Stadium: Hazza bin Zayed; Referee: Ahmad Salem

22 December 2016 13	Ittihad Kalba	1–2	Al Ain	Kalba
16:45 GMT+4 (UAE Time)	Ciel 81'	Report	Al-Kathiri 42'; Diaky 91'	Stadium: Ittihad Kalba; Referee: Yaqoub Al Hammadi

31 December 2016 3	Al Ain	1–1	Al Ahli	Al Ain
19:40 GMT+4 (UAE Time)	Caio 76'	Report	Al Fardan 82'	Stadium: Hazza bin Zayed; Referee: Adel Al Naqbi

10 January 2017 7	Hatta	2–3	Al Ain	Hatta
19:30 GMT+4 (UAE Time)	E. Obaid 82'; Samuel 95' (pen.)	Report	Douglas 28'; Caio 31'; Al-Ajmani 80' (o.g.)	Stadium: Hamdan Bin Rashid; Referee: Mohammed Abdulla

14 January 2017 14	Baniyas	1–1	Al Ain	Abu Dhabi
20:00 GMT+4 (UAE Time)	Novillo 71'	Report	O. Abdulrahman 11'	Stadium: Baniyas Stadium; Referee: Abdulla Al Ajel

19 January 2017 15	Emirates	3–2	Al Ain	Ras Al Khaimah
17:05 GMT+4 (UAE Time)	Batna 22', 73'; Sow 83'	Report	Caio 38'; Diaky 71'	Stadium: Emirates Club; Referee: Sultan Mohamed

23 January 2017 8	Al Ain	1–3	Al Jazira	Al Ain
19:30 GMT+4 (UAE Time)	O. Abdulrahman 84'	Report	M. Fawzi 31'; Leonardo 74'; Mabkhout 90'	Stadium: Hazza bin Zayed; Referee: Ammar Al-Jeneibi

28 January 2017 16	Al Ahli	1–2	Al Ain	Dubai
20:00 GMT+4 (UAE Time)	S. Jassim 87'	Report	O. Abdulrahman 51'; Caio 91'	Stadium: Rashid; Referee: Hamad Ali

3 February 2017 17	Al Ain	3–0	Al Nasr	Al Ain
20:15 GMT+4 (UAE Time)	Caio 22'; I. Ahmed 57'; O. Abdulrahman 78' (pen.)	Report		Stadium: Hazza bin Zayed; Referee: Mohammed Abdulla

9 February 2017 18	Al Ain	1–2	Dibba	Al Ain
17:25 GMT+4 (UAE Time)	Caio 52'	Report	K. Abdulrahman 56' (o.g.); Moraes 76'	Stadium: Hazza bin Zayed; Referee: Adel Al Naqbi

15 February 2017 19	Al Shabab	1–3	Al Ain	Dubai
20:15 GMT+4 (UAE Time)	M. Marzooq 41'	Report	Al-Shamrani 10' (pen.), 54' (pen.); Diaky 77'	Stadium: Maktoum bin Rashid; Referee: Mohammed Abdulla

4 March 2017 20	Al Ain	2–0	Hatta	Al Ain
17:35 GMT+4 (UAE Time)	Asprilla 27'; Diaky 83'	Report		Stadium: Hazza bin Zayed; Referee: Hamad Ali

8 March 2017 21	Al Jazira	2–0	Al Ain	Abu Dhabi
20:30 GMT+4 (UAE Time)	Mabkhout 83', 94'	Report		Stadium: Mohammed bin Zayed; Referee: Yaqoub Al Hammadi

6 April 2017 22	Al Ain	5–2	Al Dhafra	Al Ain
17:50 GMT+4 (UAE Time)	Al-Shamrani 12', 31'; Barman 24'; Diaky 58'; Y. Ahmed 73'	Report	H. Al-Ahbabi 18'; Salhi 86'	Stadium: Hazza bin Zayed; Referee: Adel Al Naqbi

15 April 2017 23	Al Wasl	4–3	Al Ain	Dubai
20:45 GMT+4 (UAE Time)	Caio 37' (pen.), 56'; Lima 77', 92'	Report	Y. Ahmed 23', 25'; Caio 28'	Stadium: Zabeel; Referee: Mohammed Abdulla

29 April 2017 24	Al Ain	3–2	Al Wahda	Al Ain
20:45 GMT+4 (UAE Time)	Asprilla 59', 74'; Al-Shamrani 94'	Report	Chang-woo 81'; Valdivia 85'	Stadium: Hazza bin Zayed; Referee: Sultan Al Marzouqi

3 May 2017 25	Sharjah	2–4	Al Ain	Sharjah
21:00 GMT+4 (UAE Time)	Rivas 16'; A. Omar 77'	Report	Asprilla 24'; Al-Shamrani 55' (pen.), 82' (pen.); M. Khalfan 84'	Stadium: Sharjah; Referee: Fahad Al-Kassar

13 May 2017 26	Al Ain	2–1	Ittihad Kalba	Al Ain
18:05 GMT+4 (UAE Time)	Diaky 24'; Al-Shamrani 85'	Report	S. Suroor 61'	Stadium: Hazza bin Zayed; Referee: Ammar Al-Jeneibi

=== President's Cup ===
26 December 2016 Round of 16	Al Ahli	1–3 (a.e.t.)	Al Ain	Abu Dhabi
19:55	A. Khalil 57' (pen.)	Report	O. Abdulrahman 79' (pen.), 122'; Diaky 97'	Stadium: Mohammed bin Zayed; Referee: Ammar Al-Jeneibi

5 January 2017 Quarter-finals	Al Ain	0–1	Al Nasr	Abu Dhabi
20:00		Report	J. Yaqoob 26'	Stadium: Mohammed bin Zayed; Referee: Omar Al Ali

=== League Cup ===
==== Group stage ====
===== Group B =====
Team	Pld	W	D	L	GF	GA	GD	Pts
Al Shabab	6	3	2	1	13	9	+4	11
Al Ahli	6	3	2	1	12	6	+6	11
Al Nasr	6	3	2	1	8	6	+2	11
Al Ain	6	2	2	2	12	15	−3	8
Dibba	6	2	1	3	8	10	−2	7
Ittihad Kalba	6	1	2	3	6	9	−3	5
Baniyas	6	0	3	3	6	10	−4	3

Source: Soccerway

2 September 2016 1	Al Ain	3–2	Ittihad Kalba	Al Ain
20:30 GMT+4 (UAE Time)	Diaky 11' (pen.); Douglas 27'; Al-Kathiri 93'	Report	Y. Abdullah 59'; Costea 64'	Stadium: Hazza bin Zayed; Referee: Yahya Al Mulla

7 September 2016 2	Al Ahli	5–1	Al Ain	Dubai
20:30 GMT+4 (UAE Time)	Lima 5'; Al Fardan 42'; W. Hussain 69'; Gyan 79'; Ribeiro 89'	Report	Caio 91'	Stadium: Rashid; Referee: Yaqoub Al Hammadi

30 September 2016 3	Al Ain	2–3	Al Nasr	Al Ain
20:00 GMT+4 (UAE Time)	Douglas 58'; Asprilla 91'	Report	A. Khamis 23', 56'; Barrada 45'	Stadium: Hazza bin Zayed; Referee: Yaqoub Al Hammadi

10 October 2016 4	Al Shabab	2–2	Al Ain	Dubai
20:00 GMT+4 (UAE Time)	M. Mohammed 8'; Luvannor 39'	Report	Asprilla 22'; Douglas 43' (pen.)	Stadium: Maktoum bin Rashid; Referee: Ahmad Salem

11 November 2016 5	Al Ain	2–2	Baniyas	Al Ain
19:30 GMT+4 (UAE Time)	Asprilla 62'; Douglas 70'	Report	Hernández 73'; Larrivey 80'	Stadium: Hazza bin Zayed; Referee: Abdulla Al Ajel

13 December 2016 6	Dibba	1–2	Al Ain	Fujairah
19:30 GMT+4 (UAE Time)	Al-Bakhit 36'	Report	Al-Kathiri 33', 92'	Stadium: Fujairah; Referee: Yahya Al Mulla

=== AFC Champions League ===
==== Group stage ====
===== Group C =====
Pos	Team	Pld	W	D	L	GF	GA	GD	Pts	Qualification	AIN	AHL	ZOB	BUN
1	(United Arab Emirates) Al-Ain	6	3	3	0	14	7	+7	12	Advance to knockout stage	—	2–2	1–1	3–0
2	(Saudi Arabia) Al-Ahli	6	3	2	1	10	7	+3	11	Advance to knockout stage	2–2	—	2–0	2–0
3	(Iran) Zob Ahan	6	2	1	3	6	9	−3	7		0–3	1–2	—	2–1
4	(Uzbekistan) Bunyodkor	6	1	0	5	5	12	−7	3		2–3	2–0	0–2	—

Source: AFC

21 February 2017	Al Ain (United Arab Emirates)	1–1	(Iran) Zob Ahan	Hazza Bin Zayed Stadium, Al Ain
19:15 UTC+4	Ismail 76'	Report	Bengtson 57'	Attendance: 8,122; Referee: Ali Sabah (Iraq)

28 February 2017	Bunyodkor (Uzbekistan)	2–3	(United Arab Emirates) Al Ain	Bunyodkor Stadium, Tashkent
18:00 UTC+5	Cemîrtan 10'; Khamdamov 43'	Report	O. Abdulrahman 8', 89' (pen.); Caio 15'	Attendance: 4,339; Referee: Jarred Gillett (Australia)

13 March 2017	Al-Ahli (Saudi Arabia)	2–2	(United Arab Emirates) Al Ain	King Abdullah Sports City, Jeddah
20:30 UTC+3	Balghaith 26'; Fetfatzidis 50'	Report	Al-Shamrani 28'; Balghaith 52' (o.g.)	Attendance: 23,431; Referee: Adham Makhadmeh (Jordan)

11 April 2017	Al Ain (United Arab Emirates)	2–2	(Saudi Arabia) Al-Ahli	Hazza Bin Zayed Stadium, Al Ain
19:35 UTC+4	Ismael 7'; O. Abdulrahman 85' (pen.)	Report	Al Somah 43', 89'	Attendance: 9,224; Referee: Ali Sabah (Iraq)

24 April 2017	Zob Ahan (Iran)	0–3	(United Arab Emirates) Al Ain	Foolad Shahr Stadium, Isfahan
20:30 UTC+4:30		Report	Asprilla 25'; O. Abdulrahman 59'; M. Abdulrahman 80'	Attendance: 6,321; Referee: Hettikamkanamge Perera (Sri Lanka)

8 May 2017	Al Ain (United Arab Emirates)	3–0	(Uzbekistan) Bunyodkor	Hazza Bin Zayed Stadium, Al Ain
19:40 UTC+4	Al-Shamrani 34'; O. Abdulrahman 76'; Diaky 90+1'	Report		Attendance: 6,244; Referee: Khamis Al-Marri (Qatar)

===== Knockout stage =====
====== Round of 16 ======
22 May 2017	Esteghlal (Iran)	1–0	(United Arab Emirates) Al Ain	Azadi Stadium, Tehran
20:45 UTC+4:30	Rezaei 90+2' (pen.)	Report		Attendance: 67,202; Referee: Fu Ming (China)

29 May 2017	Al Ain (United Arab Emirates)	6–1	(Iran) Esteghlal	Hazza Bin Zayed Stadium, Al Ain
22:45 UTC+4	Caio 27', 33'; O. Abdulrahman 49', 60'; Lee Myung-joo 56'; Al-Shamrani 75'	Report	Rezaei 83'	Attendance: 11,226; Referee: Ko Hyung-jin (South Korea)

Al-Ain won 6–2 on aggregate.

====== Quarter-finals ======
21 August 2017	Al Ain (United Arab Emirates)	0–0	(Saudi Arabia) Al-Hilal	Hazza Bin Zayed Stadium, Al Ain
19:50 UTC+4		Report		Attendance: 21,223; Referee: Peter Green (Australia)

11 September 2017	Al-Hilal (Saudi Arabia)	3–0	(United Arab Emirates) Al Ain	King Fahd International Stadium, Riyadh
20:00 UTC+3	Carlos Eduardo 42', 45+1', 74'	Report		Attendance: 42,146; Referee: Ravshan Irmatov (Uzbekistan)

Al Hilal won 3–0 on aggregate.

== Statistics ==
=== Squad appearances and goals ===
Last updated on 11 September 2017.

No.	Pos	Nat	Player	Total		Pro League		League Cup		President's Cup		Champions League	
No.	Pos	Nat	Player	Apps	Goals	Apps	Goals	Apps	Goals	Apps	Goals	Apps	Goals
Goalkeepers
17	GK	(United Arab Emirates) UAE	Khalid Eisa	34	0	21	0	1	0	2	0	10	0
22	GK	(United Arab Emirates) UAE	Mahmoud Almas	3	0	0	0	3	0	0	0	0	0
36	GK	(United Arab Emirates) UAE	Dawoud Sulaiman	1	0	0	0	1	0	0	0	0	0
40	GK	(United Arab Emirates) UAE	Mohammed Abo Sandah	6	0	5	0	1	0	0	0	0	0
75	GK	(United Arab Emirates) UAE	Hamad Al Mansoori	0	0	0	0	0	0	0	0	0	0
Defenders
2	DF	(United Arab Emirates) UAE	Ali Moustafa	0	0	0	0	0	0	0	0	0	0
3	DF	(United Arab Emirates) UAE	Dawood Ali	11	0	6+1	0	0	0	0	0	4	0
4	DF	(United Arab Emirates) UAE	Saeed Al-Menhali	11	0	7	0	3+1	0	0	0	0	0
5	DF	(United Arab Emirates) UAE	Ismail Ahmed	30	5	19	3	0	0	2	0	9	2
14	DF	(United Arab Emirates) UAE	Mohammed Al-Dhahri	4	0	3	0	0	0	0	0	1	0
15	DF	(United Arab Emirates) UAE	Khaled Abdulrahman	30	0	13+3	0	3+1	0	2	0	8	0
19	DF	(United Arab Emirates) UAE	Mohanad Salem	28	1	19	1	0	0	2	0	7	0
21	DF	(United Arab Emirates) UAE	Fawzi Fayez	14	0	7+2	0	5	0	0	0	0	0
23	DF	(United Arab Emirates) UAE	Mohamed Ahmed	5	0	1+1	0	0	0	0	0	3	0
31	DF	(United Arab Emirates) UAE	Ahmed Salem	1	0	0	0	1	0	0	0	0	0
33	DF	(Japan) JPN	Tsukasa Shiotani	2	0	0	0	0	0	0	0	2	0
37	DF	(United Arab Emirates) UAE	Rashed Muhayer	16	0	4+4	0	3+2	0	0	0	3	0
44	DF	(United Arab Emirates) UAE	Salem Al-Azizi	17	0	5+3	0	3+1	0	0	0	5	0
50	DF	(United Arab Emirates) UAE	Mohammed Fayez	4	0	1	0	3	0	0	0	0	0
59	DF	(United Arab Emirates) UAE	Saeed Juma	5	0	3	0	0	0	0	0	2	0
Midfielders
6	MF	(United Arab Emirates) UAE	Amer Abdulrahman	19	0	11+5	0	1	0	2	0	0	0
7	MF	(Brazil) BRA	Caio Lucas	41	16	24	12	5	1	2	0	10	3
10	MF	(United Arab Emirates) UAE	Omar Abdulrahman	34	9	22	0	0	0	2	2	10	7
13	MF	(United Arab Emirates) UAE	Ahmed Barman	40	1	19+5	1	5	0	2	0	9	0
16	MF	(United Arab Emirates) UAE	Mohamed Abdulrahman	33	1	17+4	0	2	0	1	0	9	1
18	MF	(United Arab Emirates) UAE	Ibrahim Diaky	31	11	4+13	8	6	1	2	1	6	1
26	MF	(United Arab Emirates) UAE	Khaled Khalfan	2	0	0	0	0+2	0	0	0	0	0
27	MF	(United Arab Emirates) UAE	Mohsen Abdullah	1	0	0	0	1	0	0	0	0	0
28	MF	(United Arab Emirates) UAE	Sulaiman Nasser	2	0	0+2	0	0	0	0	0	0	0
29	MF	(South Korea) KOR	Lee Myung-joo	39	1	24	0	5	0	2	0	8	1
30	MF	(United Arab Emirates) UAE	Mohammed Khalfan	7	1	0+3	1	0+1	0	0	0	3	0
43	MF	(United Arab Emirates) UAE	Rayan Yaslam	1	0	0+1	0	0	0	0	0	0	0
70	MF	(Colombia) COL	Danilo Asprilla	29	9	14+2	5	5	3	2	0	6	1
71	MF	(United Arab Emirates) UAE	Abdullah Karama	0	0	0	0	0	0	0	0	0	0
77	MF	(United Arab Emirates) UAE	Bandar Al-Ahbabi	23	0	12+3	0	1	0	2	0	5	0
79	MF	(United Arab Emirates) UAE	Hussain Abdullah	0	0	0	0	0	0	0	0	0	0
Forwards
9	FW	(Brazil) BRA	Dyanfres Douglas	21	10	11+1	6	5	4	2	0	2	0
9	FW	(Sweden) SWE	Marcus Berg	2	0	0	0	0	0	0	0	2	0
11	FW	(United Arab Emirates) UAE	Saeed Al-Kathiri	22	5	4+11	2	2+2	3	1	0	2	0
20	FW	(Saudi Arabia) KSA	Nasser Al-Shamrani	15	11	8+2	8	0	0	0	0	5	3
35	FW	(United Arab Emirates) UAE	Yousef Ahmed	18	3	2+5	3	1+4	0	0	0	6	0
52	FW	(United Arab Emirates) UAE	Ali Eid	2	0	0+1	0	0+1	0	0	0	0	0
Players transferred out during the season
8	MF	(United Arab Emirates) UAE	Rashed Eisa	5	0	0+3	0	1+1	0	0	0	0	0

=== Goalscorers ===
As of 29 May 2017

Includes all competitive matches. The list is sorted alphabetically by surname when total goals are equal.

Rank	No.	Pos.	Player	Pro-League	President's Cup	League Cup	Champions League	Total
1	7	MF	(Brazil) Caio Lucas	12	0	1	3	16
2	10	MF	(United Arab Emirates) Omar Abdulrahman	6	2	0	7	15
3	20	FW	(Saudi Arabia) Nasser Al-Shamrani	8	0	0	3	11
3	18	MF	(United Arab Emirates) Ibrahim Diaky	8	1	1	1	11
5	9	FW	(Brazil) Dyanfres Douglas	6	0	4	0	10
6	70	MF	(Colombia) Danilo Asprilla	5	0	3	1	9
7	5	DF	(United Arab Emirates) Ismail Ahmed	3	0	0	2	5
7	11	FW	(United Arab Emirates) Saeed Al-Kathiri	2	0	3	0	5
9	35	FW	(United Arab Emirates) Yousef Ahmed	3	0	0	0	3
10	13	MF	(United Arab Emirates) Ahmed Barman	1	0	0	0	1
10	30	FW	(United Arab Emirates) Mohammed Khalfan	1	0	0	0	1
10	19	DF	(United Arab Emirates) Mohanad Salem	1	0	0	0	1
10	16	MF	(United Arab Emirates) Mohamed Abdulrahman	0	0	0	1	1
10	29	MF	(South Korea) Lee Myung-joo	0	0	0	1	1
Own goals				2	0	0	1	3
Totals				58	3	12	20	93

=== Disciplinary record ===
N	P	Nat.	Name	Pro League			League Cup			President's Cup			Champions League			Total			Notes
N	P	Nat.	Name	Yellow card	Second yellow card	Red card	Yellow card	Second yellow card	Red card	Yellow card	Second yellow card	Red card	Yellow card	Second yellow card	Red card	Yellow card	Second yellow card	Red card	Notes
10	MF	(United Arab Emirates)	Omar Abdulrahman	7	1					1			1			9	1		
5	DF	(United Arab Emirates)	Ismail Ahmed	3		1				2			3			8		1	
29	MF	(South Korea)	Lee Myung-joo	7												7			
13	MF	(United Arab Emirates)	Ahmed Barman	3						1			2			6			
7	MF	(Brazil)	Caio Lucas	4	1					1						5	1		
19	DF	(United Arab Emirates)	Mohanad Salem	4										1		4	1		
6	MF	(United Arab Emirates)	Amer Abdulrahman	4												4			
16	MF	(United Arab Emirates)	Mohamed Abdulrahman	3									1			4			
9	FW	(Brazil)	Dyanfres Douglas	1			1			1			1			4			
15	DF	(United Arab Emirates)	Khaled Abdulrahman				1						2			3			
11	FW	(United Arab Emirates)	Saeed Al-Kathiri	2			1									3			
21	DF	(United Arab Emirates)	Fawzi Fayez	1			2									3			
18	MF	(United Arab Emirates)	Ibrahim Diaky				2									2			
4	DF	(United Arab Emirates)	Saeed Al-Menhali				2									2			
30	FW	(United Arab Emirates)	Mohammed Khalfan	1									1			2			
17	GK	(United Arab Emirates)	Khalid Eisa	2												2			
70	MF	(United Arab Emirates)	Danilo Asprilla	2												2			
59	DF	(United Arab Emirates)	Saeed Juma											1			1		
22	GK	(United Arab Emirates)	Mahmoud Almas	1												1			
40	GK	(United Arab Emirates)	Mohammed Abo Sandah	1												1			
37	DF	(United Arab Emirates)	Rashed Muhayer	1												1			
44	DF	(United Arab Emirates)	Salem Al-Azizi	1												1			
14	DF	(United Arab Emirates)	Mohammed Al-Dhahri	1												1			
77	MF	(United Arab Emirates)	Bandar Al-Ahbabi	1												1			
20	FW	(Saudi Arabia)	Nasser Al-Shamrani	1												1			
3	DF	(United Arab Emirates)	Dawood Ali										1			1			
23	DF	(United Arab Emirates)	Mohamed Ahmed										1			1			
70	MF	(Colombia)	Danilo Asprilla							1						1			
8	MF	(United Arab Emirates)	Rashed Eisa				1									1			
26	MF	(United Arab Emirates)	Khaled Khalfan				1									1			

Last updated: 11 September 2017
Source: UAEProLeague.ae, AlAinClub.ae, The-Afc.com
Only competitive matches
(yellow card) = Number of bookings; (second yellow card) = Number of sending offs after a second yellow card; (red card) = Number of sending offs by a direct red card.

=== Assists ===
No.	Player	Pro-League	President's Cup	League Cup	Champions League	Total
10	(United Arab Emirates) Omar Abdulrahman	13	0	0	5	18
7	(Brazil) Caio Lucas	8	0	2	1	11
77	(United Arab Emirates) Bandar Al-Ahbabi	4	0	0	1	5
70	(Colombia) Danilo Asprilla	1	0	3	0	4
29	(South Korea) Lee Myung-joo	3	0	1	1	4
20	(Saudi Arabia) Nasser Al-Shamrani	1	0	0	2	3
35	(United Arab Emirates) Yousef Ahmed	1	0	1	0	2
15	(United Arab Emirates) Khaled Abdulrahman	2	0	0	0	2
5	(United Arab Emirates) Ismail Ahmed	1	0	0	1	2
9	(Brazil) Dyanfres Douglas	2	0	0	0	2
19	(United Arab Emirates) Mohanad Salem	1	0	0	0	1
16	(United Arab Emirates) Mohamed Abdulrahman	1	0	0	0	1
17	(United Arab Emirates) Khalid Eisa	1	0	0	0	1
30	(United Arab Emirates) Mohammed Khalfan	1	0	0	0	1
13	(United Arab Emirates) Ahmed Barman	0	0	1	0	1
6	(United Arab Emirates) Amer Abdulrahman	0	1	0	0	1
Totals		40	1	8	11	59

=== Hat-tricks ===
Player	Against	Result	Date	Competition
(Brazil) Douglas	Emirates	5–2 (H)	22 September 2016	Pro League (Round 2)

=== Clean sheets ===
Rank	No.	Player	Pro-League	President's Cup	League Cup	Champions League	Total
1	17	(United Arab Emirates) Khalid Eisa	3	0	0	3	6
2	40	(United Arab Emirates) Mohammed Abo Sandah	1	0	0	0	1
Totals			4	0	0	3	7
