= 2016 AFC Champions League final =

- Event: 2016 AFC Champions League
Jeonbuk Hyundai Motors	Al-Ain
(South Korea)	(United Arab Emirates)
3	2
- on aggregate

First leg
Jeonbuk Hyundai Motors	Al-Ain
2	1
- Date: 19 November 2016
- Venue: Jeonju World Cup Stadium, Jeonju
- AFC Man of the Match: Leonardo (Jeonbuk Hyundai Motors)
- Referee: Ahmed Al-Kaf (Oman)
- Attendance: 36,158
- Weather: Overcast with fog 14 °C (57 °F)

Second leg
Al-Ain	Jeonbuk Hyundai Motors
1	1
- Date: 26 November 2016
- Venue: Hazza Bin Zayed Stadium, Al Ain
- AFC Man of the Match: Choi Chul-soon (Jeonbuk Hyundai Motors)
- Referee: Ryuji Sato (Japan)
- Attendance: 23,239
- Weather: Mild; 24 °C (75 °F)

The 2016 AFC Champions League final was the final of the 2016 AFC Champions League, the 35th edition of the top-level Asian club football tournament organized by the Asian Football Confederation (AFC), and the 14th under the current AFC Champions League title.

The final was contested in two-legged home-and-away format between South Korean team Jeonbuk Hyundai Motors and United Arab Emirates team Al-Ain. The first leg was hosted by Jeonbuk Hyundai Motors at the Jeonju World Cup Stadium in Jeonju on 19 November 2016, while the second leg was hosted by Al-Ain at the Hazza Bin Zayed Stadium in Al Ain on 26 November 2016. Jeonbuk Hyundai Motors won the final 3–2 on aggregate and clinched their second title.

== Qualified teams ==
Team	Previous finals appearances (bold indicates winners)
(South Korea) Jeonbuk Hyundai Motors	**2006**, 2011
(United Arab Emirates) Al-Ain	**2003**, 2005

== Road to the final ==
Note: In all results below, the score of the finalist is given first (H: home; A: away).

(South Korea) Jeonbuk Hyundai Motors				Round	(United Arab Emirates) Al-Ain			
Opponent	Result			Group stage	Opponent	Result		
(Japan) FC Tokyo	2–1 (H)			Matchday 1	(Qatar) El Jaish	1–2 (H)		
(China) Jiangsu Suning	2–3 (A)			Matchday 2	(Qatar) El Jaish	1–2 (A)		
(Vietnam) Becamex Bình Dương	2–0 (H)			Matchday 3	(Saudi Arabia) Al-Ahli	1–0 (H)		
(Vietnam) Becamex Bình Dương	2–3 (A)			Matchday 4	(Saudi Arabia) Al-Ahli	2–1 (A)		
(Japan) FC Tokyo	3–0 (A)			Matchday 5	(Uzbekistan) Nasaf Qarshi	1–1 (A)		
(China) Jiangsu Suning	2–2 (H)			Matchday 6	(Uzbekistan) Nasaf Qarshi	2–0 (H)		
**Group E winners**: Pos / Team / Pld / Pts; **1** / (South Korea) Jeonbuk Hyundai Motors / **6** / **10**; 2 / (Japan) FC Tokyo / 6 / **10**; 3 / (China) Jiangsu Suning / 6 / **9**; 4 / (Vietnam) Becamex Binh Duong / 6 / **4**; Source: AFC				Final standings	**Group D runners-up**: Pos / Team / Pld / Pts; 1 / (Qatar) El Jaish / 6 / **10**; **2** / (United Arab Emirates) Al-Ain / **6** / **10**; 3 / (Saudi Arabia) Al-Ahli / 6 / **9**; 4 / (Uzbekistan) Nasaf Qarshi / 6 / **5**; Source: AFC			
Opponent	Agg.	1st leg	2nd leg	Knockout stage	Opponent	Agg.	1st leg	2nd leg
(Australia) Melbourne Victory	3–2	1–1 (A)	2–1 (H)	Round of 16	(Iran) Zob Ahan	3–1	1–1 (H)	2–0 (A)
(China) Shanghai SIPG	5–0	0–0 (A)	5–0 (H)	Quarter-finals	(Uzbekistan) Lokomotiv Tashkent	1–0	0–0 (H)	1–0 (A)
(South Korea) FC Seoul	5–3	4–1 (H)	1–2 (A)	Semi-finals	(Qatar) El Jaish	5–3	3–1 (H)	2–2 (A)

== Rules ==
The final was played on a home-and-away two-legged basis, with the order of legs decided by draw. The away goals rule, extra time (away goals do not apply in extra time) and penalty shoot-out were used to decide the winner if necessary.

== Match details ==
=== First leg ===
19 November 2016
19:00 UTC+9

Jeonbuk Hyundai Motors (South Korea)	2–1	(United Arab Emirates) Al-Ain
Leonardo 70', 77' (pen.)	Report	Asprilla 63'

Jeonju World Cup Stadium, Jeonju
Attendance: 36,158
Referee: Ahmed Al-Kaf (Oman)

**Jeonbuk Hyundai Motors**	**Al-Ain**

GK	1	(South Korea) Kwon Sun-tae (c)
RB	27	(South Korea) Kim Chang-soo
CB	15	(South Korea) Lim Jong-eun
CB	3	(South Korea) Kim Hyung-il	(yellow card) 42'
LB	19	(South Korea) Park Won-jae
DM	25	(South Korea) Choi Chul-soon
RM	11	(Brazil) Ricardo Lopes
CM	13	(South Korea) Kim Bo-kyung		(substituted off) 64'
CM	17	(South Korea) Lee Jae-sung
LM	10	(Brazil) Leonardo
CF	99	(South Korea) Kim Shin-wook		(substituted off) 81'
Substitutes:
GK	21	(South Korea) Hong Jeong-nam
DF	30	(South Korea) Kim Young-chan
MF	7	(South Korea) Han Kyo-won
MF	34	(South Korea) Jang Yun-ho
FW	9	(South Korea) Lee Jong-ho
FW	20	(South Korea) Lee Dong-gook		(substituted on) 64'
FW	81	(Brazil) Edu		(substituted on) 81'
Manager:
(South Korea) Choi Kang-hee

GK	17	(United Arab Emirates) Khalid Eisa
RB	5	(United Arab Emirates) Ismail Ahmed
CB	19	(United Arab Emirates) Mohanad Salem	(yellow card) 76'
CB	21	(United Arab Emirates) Fawzi Fayez
LB	50	(United Arab Emirates) Mohammed Fayez
CM	7	(Brazil) Caio
CM	10	(United Arab Emirates) Omar Abdulrahman (c)
RW	13	(United Arab Emirates) Ahmed Barman
AM	16	(United Arab Emirates) Mohamed Abdulrahman		(substituted off) 77'
LW	29	(South Korea) Lee Myung-joo
CF	70	(Colombia) Danilo Asprilla	(yellow card) 69'	(substituted off) 90+3'
Substitutes:
GK	22	(United Arab Emirates) Mahmoud Almas
DF	4	(United Arab Emirates) Saeed Mosabah
DF	37	(United Arab Emirates) Rashed Muhayer
DF	44	(United Arab Emirates) Salem Juma
MF	18	(United Arab Emirates) Ibrahim Diaky		(substituted on) 90+3'
FW	9	(Brazil) Dyanfres Douglas		(substituted on) 77'
FW	11	(United Arab Emirates) Saeed Al-Kathiri
Manager:
(Croatia) Zlatko Dalić

AFC Man of the Match:
(Brazil) Leonardo (Jeonbuk Hyundai Motors)

Assistant referees:
Rashid Hamed Ali Al Ghaithi (Oman)
Abdullah Ali Abdullah Al Jardani (Oman)
Fourth official:
Jameel Juma Abdulhusain Mohamed (Bahrain)

=== Second leg ===
26 November 2016
18:25 UTC+4

Al-Ain (United Arab Emirates)	1–1	(South Korea) Jeonbuk Hyundai Motors
Lee Myung-joo 34'	Report	Han Kyo-won 30'

Hazza Bin Zayed Stadium, Al Ain
Attendance: 23,239
Referee: Ryuji Sato (Japan)

**Al-Ain**	**Jeonbuk Hyundai Motors**

GK	17	(United Arab Emirates) Khalid Eisa
RB	5	(United Arab Emirates) Ismail Ahmed
CB	19	(United Arab Emirates) Mohanad Salem	(yellow card) 60'	(substituted off) 86'
CB	21	(United Arab Emirates) Fawzi Fayez
LB	50	(United Arab Emirates) Mohammed Fayez		(substituted off) 71'
CM	7	(Brazil) Caio
CM	10	(United Arab Emirates) Omar Abdulrahman (c)	(yellow card) 90'
RW	13	(United Arab Emirates) Ahmed Barman
LW	29	(South Korea) Lee Myung-joo
CF	70	(Colombia) Danilo Asprilla
CF	9	(Brazil) Dyanfres Douglas		(substituted off) 78'
Substitutes:
GK	22	(United Arab Emirates) Mahmoud Almas
DF	4	(United Arab Emirates) Saeed Mosabah		(substituted on) 86'
DF	44	(United Arab Emirates) Salem Juma
MF	16	(United Arab Emirates) Mohamed Abdulrahman		(substituted on) 71'
MF	18	(United Arab Emirates) Ibrahim Diaky		(substituted on) 78'
MF	25	(United Arab Emirates) Amer Abdulrahman
FW	11	(United Arab Emirates) Saeed Al-Kathiri
Manager:
(Croatia) Zlatko Dalić

GK	1	(South Korea) Kwon Sun-tae (c)	(yellow card) 90+5'
RB	27	(South Korea) Kim Chang-soo
CB	3	(South Korea) Kim Hyung-il
CB	16	(South Korea) Cho Sung-hwan	(yellow card) 90+3'
LB	19	(South Korea) Park Won-jae	(yellow card) 65'
DM	25	(South Korea) Choi Chul-soon
RM	11	(Brazil) Ricardo Lopes		(substituted off) 5'
CM	13	(South Korea) Kim Bo-kyung		(substituted off) 90'
CM	17	(South Korea) Lee Jae-sung
LM	10	(Brazil) Leonardo
CF	20	(South Korea) Lee Dong-gook		(substituted off) 58'
Substitutes:
GK	21	(South Korea) Hong Jeong-nam
DF	15	(South Korea) Lim Jong-eun
MF	7	(South Korea) Han Kyo-won	(yellow card) 59'	(substituted on) 5'
MF	34	(South Korea) Jang Yun-ho
FW	9	(South Korea) Lee Jong-ho
FW	81	(Brazil) Edu		(substituted on) 90'
FW	99	(South Korea) Kim Shin-wook	(yellow card) 67'	(substituted on) 58'
Manager:
(South Korea) Choi Kang-hee

AFC Man of the Match:
(South Korea) Choi Chul-soon (Jeonbuk Hyundai Motors)

Assistant referees:
Toru Sagara (Japan)
Hiroshi Yamauchi (Japan)
Fourth official:
Jumpei Iida (Japan)
