= 2016 AFC Champions League knockout stage =

International club football tournament

The 2016 AFC Champions League knockout stage was played from 17 May to 26 November 2016. A total of 16 teams competed in the knockout stage to decide the champions of the 2016 AFC Champions League.

== Qualified teams ==
The winners and runners-up of each of the eight groups in the group stage qualified for the knockout stage. Both West Zone and East Zone had eight qualified teams.

Zone	Group	Winners	Runners-up
West Zone (Groups A–D)	A	(Uzbekistan) Lokomotiv Tashkent	(United Arab Emirates) Al-Nasr
West Zone (Groups A–D)	B	(Iran) Zob Ahan	(Qatar) Lekhwiya
West Zone (Groups A–D)	C	(Iran) Tractor Sazi	(Saudi Arabia) Al-Hilal
West Zone (Groups A–D)	D	(Qatar) El Jaish	(United Arab Emirates) Al-Ain
East Zone (Groups E–H)	E	(South Korea) Jeonbuk Hyundai Motors	(Japan) FC Tokyo
East Zone (Groups E–H)	F	(South Korea) FC Seoul	(China) Shandong Luneng
East Zone (Groups E–H)	G	(China) Shanghai SIPG	(Australia) Melbourne Victory
East Zone (Groups E–H)	H	(Australia) Sydney FC	(Japan) Urawa Red Diamonds

== Format ==
In the knockout stage, the 16 teams played a single-elimination tournament, with the teams split between the two zones until the final. Each tie was played on a home-and-away two-legged basis. The away goals rule, extra time (away goals do not apply in extra time) and penalty shoot-out were used to decide the winner if necessary (Regulations Article 12.3).

== Schedule ==
The schedule of each round was as follows.

Round	First leg	Second leg
Round of 16	17–18 May 2016	24–25 May 2016
Quarter-finals	23–24 August 2016	13–14 September 2016
Semi-finals	27–28 September 2016	18–19 October 2016
Final	19 November 2016	26 November 2016

== Bracket ==
The bracket of the knockout stage was determined as follows:

- Round of 16: (group winners host second legs)

West Zone

- Winner Group A vs. Runner-up Group C
- Winner Group C vs. Runner-up Group A
- Winner Group B vs. Runner-up Group D
- Winner Group D vs. Runner-up Group B

East Zone

- Winner Group E vs. Runner-up Group G
- Winner Group G vs. Runner-up Group E
- Winner Group F vs. Runner-up Group H
- Winner Group H vs. Runner-up Group F

- Quarterfinals: (matchups and order of legs decided by draw)

West Zone

- QF1
- QF2

East Zone

- QF3
- QF4

- Semifinals: (Winners QF1 and QF3 host first leg, Winners QF2 and QF4 host second leg)

West Zone

- SF1: Winner QF1 vs. Winner QF2

East Zone

- SF2: Winner QF3 vs. Winner QF4

- Final: Winner SF1 vs. Winner SF2 (Winner SF2 host first leg, Winner SF1 host second leg)

Round of 16
(Japan) FC Tokyo	2	0	2
(China) Shanghai SIPG (a)	1	1	2
(Australia) Melbourne Victory	1	1	2
(South Korea) Jeonbuk Hyundai Motors	1	2	3
(Japan) Urawa Red Diamonds	1	2	3 (6)
(South Korea) FC Seoul (p)	0	3	3 (7)
(China) Shandong Luneng (a)	1	2	3
(Australia) Sydney FC	1	2	3
(United Arab Emirates) Al-Ain	1	2	3
(Iran) Zob Ahan	1	0	1
(Saudi Arabia) Al-Hilal	0	1	1
(Uzbekistan) Lokomotiv Tashkent	0	2	2
(Qatar) Lekhwiya	0	4	4
(Qatar) El Jaish	4	2	6
(United Arab Emirates) Al-Nasr	4	1	5
(Iran) Tractor Sazi	1	3	4

Quarter-finals
(China) Shanghai SIPG	0	0	0
(South Korea) Jeonbuk Hyundai Motors	0	5	5
(South Korea) FC Seoul	3	1	4
(China) Shandong Luneng	1	1	2
(United Arab Emirates) Al-Ain	0	1	1
(Uzbekistan) Lokomotiv Tashkent	0	0	0
(Qatar) El Jaish (1st leg awd.)	3	1	4
(United Arab Emirates) Al-Nasr	0	0	0

Semi-finals
(South Korea) Jeonbuk Hyundai Motors	4	1	5
(South Korea) FC Seoul	1	2	3
(United Arab Emirates) Al-Ain	3	2	5
(Qatar) El Jaish	1	2	3

Final
(South Korea) Jeonbuk Hyundai Motors	2	1	3
(United Arab Emirates) Al-Ain	1	1	2

== Round of 16 ==
In the round of 16, the winners of one group played the runners-up of another group from the same zone, with the group winners hosting the second leg.

West Zone
Team 1	Agg.	Team 2	1st leg	2nd leg
Al-Hilal (Saudi Arabia)	1–2	(Uzbekistan) Lokomotiv Tashkent	0–0	1–2
Al-Nasr (United Arab Emirates)	5–4	(Iran) Tractor Sazi	4–1	1–3
Al-Ain (United Arab Emirates)	3–1	(Iran) Zob Ahan	1–1	2–0
Lekhwiya (Qatar)	4–6	(Qatar) El Jaish	0–4	4–2

East Zone
Team 1	Agg.	Team 2	1st leg	2nd leg
Melbourne Victory (Australia)	2–3	(South Korea) Jeonbuk Hyundai Motors	1–1	1–2
FC Tokyo (Japan)	2–2 (a)	(China) Shanghai SIPG	2–1	0–1
Urawa Red Diamonds (Japan)	3–3 (6–7 p)	(South Korea) FC Seoul	1–0	2–3 (a.e.t.)
Shandong Luneng (China)	3–3 (a)	(Australia) Sydney FC	1–1	2–2

=== West Zone ===
17 May 2016
21:05 UTC+3

Al-Hilal (Saudi Arabia)	0–0	(Uzbekistan) Lokomotiv Tashkent
	Report

King Fahd International Stadium, Riyadh
Attendance: 14,132
Referee: Ko Hyung-jin (South Korea)
24 May 2016
18:00 UTC+5

Lokomotiv Tashkent (Uzbekistan)	2–1	(Saudi Arabia) Al-Hilal
Tukhtakhodjaev 26'; Fayziev 56'	Report	Al-Shalhoub 89' (pen.)

Bunyodkor Stadium, Tashkent
Attendance: 5,271
Referee: Ben Williams (Australia)

Lokomotiv Tashkent won 2–1 on aggregate.

17 May 2016
20:45 UTC+4

Al-Nasr (United Arab Emirates)	4–1	(Iran) Tractor Sazi
Al-Yassi 15'; Saleh 41', 77'; Khamees 89'	Report	Augusto 59'

Al-Maktoum Stadium, Dubai
Attendance: 6,700
Referee: Ryuji Sato (Japan)
24 May 2016
20:00 UTC+4:30

Tractor Sazi (Iran)	3–1	(United Arab Emirates) Al-Nasr
Hatami 47', 73'; Iranpourian 61'	Report	Saleh 16'

Sahand Stadium, Tabriz
Attendance: 65,100
Referee: Muhammad Taqi (Singapore)

Al-Nasr won 5–4 on aggregate.

18 May 2016
19:40 UTC+4

Al-Ain (United Arab Emirates)	1–1	(Iran) Zob Ahan
Douglas 9'	Report	Abbasi 75'

Hazza Bin Zayed Stadium, Al Ain
Attendance: 10,708
Referee: Kim Sang-woo (South Korea)
25 May 2016
20:45 UTC+4:30

Zob Ahan (Iran)	0–2	(United Arab Emirates) Al-Ain
	Report	Lee Myung-joo 12'; Asprilla 62'

Foolad Shahr Stadium, Isfahan
Attendance: 9,960
Referee: Kim Jong-hyeok (South Korea)

Al-Ain won 3–1 on aggregate.

17 May 2016
19:15 UTC+3

Lekhwiya (Qatar)	0–4	(Qatar) El Jaish
	Report	Romarinho 17', 86'; Hamdallah 44'; Mothnani 54'

Abdullah bin Khalifa Stadium, Doha
Attendance: 3,020
Referee: Mohd Amirul Izwan Yaacob (Malaysia)
25 May 2016
19:00 UTC+3

El Jaish (Qatar)	2–4	(Qatar) Lekhwiya
Rashidov 37'; Romarinho 70'	Report	Kaluyituka 8'; Mohammad 48', 52'; Nam Tae-hee 65' (pen.)

Jassim Bin Hamad Stadium, Al Rayyan
Attendance: 5,300
Referee: Ahmed Al-Kaf (Oman)

El Jaish won 6–4 on aggregate.

=== East Zone ===
17 May 2016
19:45 UTC+10

Melbourne Victory (Australia)	1–1	(South Korea) Jeonbuk Hyundai Motors
Berisha 5'	Report	Leonardo 14'

Melbourne Rectangular Stadium, Melbourne
Attendance: 11,542
Referee: Alireza Faghani (Iran)
24 May 2016
19:00 UTC+9

Jeonbuk Hyundai Motors (South Korea)	2–1	(Australia) Melbourne Victory
Leonardo 28', 71'	Report	Berisha 84'

Jeonju World Cup Stadium, Jeonju
Attendance: 12,811
Referee: Hettikamkanamge Perera (Sri Lanka)

Jeonbuk Hyundai Motors won 3–2 on aggregate.

17 May 2016
19:30 UTC+9

FC Tokyo (Japan)	2–1	(China) Shanghai SIPG
Mizunuma 43', 65'	Report	Wu Lei 55'

Ajinomoto Stadium, Tokyo
Attendance: 9,052
Referee: Mohammed Abdulla Hassan Mohamed (United Arab Emirates)
24 May 2016
19:30 UTC+8

Shanghai SIPG (China)	1–0	(Japan) FC Tokyo
Wu Lei 90+1'	Report

Shanghai Stadium, Shanghai
Attendance: 26,768
Referee: Mohanad Qasim Eesee Sarray (Iraq)

2–2 on aggregate. Shanghai SIPG won on away goals.

18 May 2016
19:30 UTC+9

Urawa Red Diamonds (Japan)	1–0	(South Korea) FC Seoul
Ugajin 14'	Report

Saitama Stadium 2002, Saitama
Attendance: 21,182
Referee: Ravshan Irmatov (Uzbekistan)
25 May 2016
19:30 UTC+9

FC Seoul (South Korea)	3–2 (a.e.t.)	(Japan) Urawa Red Diamonds
Damjanović 29'; Adriano 94'; Go Yo-han 120+1'	Report	Tadanari Lee 112', 115'
Penalties
Adriano (penalty scored); Park Chu-young (penalty scored); Osmar (penalty missed); Kim Won-sik (penalty scored); Go Yo-han (penalty scored); Park Yong-woo (penalty scored); Ko Kwang-min (penalty scored); Kim Dong-woo (penalty scored)	7–6	(penalty scored) Abe; (penalty scored) Endo; (penalty scored) Ljubijankić; (penalty scored) Moriwaki; (penalty missed) Nishikawa; (penalty scored) Umesaki; (penalty scored) Tadanari Lee; (penalty missed) Komai

Seoul World Cup Stadium, Seoul
Attendance: 14,173
Referee: Adham Makhadmeh (Jordan)

3–3 on aggregate. FC Seoul won 7–6 on penalties.

18 May 2016
19:30 UTC+8

Shandong Luneng (China)	1–1	(Australia) Sydney FC
Tardelli 56'	Report	Carney 15'

Jinan Olympic Sports Center Stadium, Jinan
Attendance: 16,917
Referee: Abdulrahman Al-Jassim (Qatar)
25 May 2016
20:00 UTC+10

Sydney FC (Australia)	2–2	(China) Shandong Luneng
O'Neill 2'; Grant 46'	Report	Montillo 12'; Hao Junmin 90'

Sydney Football Stadium, Sydney
Attendance: 9,451
Referee: Ilgiz Tantashev (Uzbekistan)

3–3 on aggregate. Shandong Luneng won on away goals.

== Quarter-finals ==
In the quarter-finals, the four teams from the West Zone were drawn into two ties, and the four teams from the East Zone were drawn into the other two ties, with the order of legs also decided by the draw.

The draw for the quarter-finals was held on 9 June 2016, 16:00 MYT (UTC+8), at the Petaling Jaya Hilton Hotel in Kuala Lumpur, Malaysia. There was no seeding or country protection, so teams from the same association could be drawn into the same tie.

West Region
Team 1	Agg.	Team 2	1st leg	2nd leg
Al-Ain (United Arab Emirates)	1–0	(Uzbekistan) Lokomotiv Tashkent	0–0	1–0
El Jaish (Qatar)	4–0	(United Arab Emirates) Al-Nasr	3–0 (awd.)	1–0

East Region
Team 1	Agg.	Team 2	1st leg	2nd leg
Shanghai SIPG (China)	0–5	(South Korea) Jeonbuk Hyundai Motors	0–0	0–5
FC Seoul (South Korea)	4–2	(China) Shandong Luneng	3–1	1–1

=== West Zone ===
23 August 2016
19:30 UTC+4

Al-Ain (United Arab Emirates)	0–0	(Uzbekistan) Lokomotiv Tashkent
	Report

Hazza Bin Zayed Stadium, Al Ain
Attendance: 15,733
Referee: Adham Makhadmeh (Jordan)
13 September 2016
19:00 UTC+5

Lokomotiv Tashkent (Uzbekistan)	0–1	(United Arab Emirates) Al-Ain
	Report	Caio 38'

Bunyodkor Stadium, Tashkent
Attendance: 7,661
Referee: Muhammad Taqi (Singapore)

Al-Ain won 1–0 on aggregate.

24 August 2016
19:00 UTC+3

El Jaish (Qatar)	3–0 Awarded	(United Arab Emirates) Al-Nasr
	Report	Wanderley 45', 86'; Pitroipa 55'

Abdullah bin Khalifa Stadium, Doha
Attendance: 5,120
Referee: Jumpei Iida (Japan)

The El Jaish v Al-Nasr first leg, originally won 3–0 by Al-Nasr, was forfeited and awarded 3–0 to El Jaish by the AFC Disciplinary Committee on 12 September 2016, as Al-Nasr fielded the player Wanderley, who was found to be registered using a fake Indonesian passport.

14 September 2016
20:45 UTC+4

Al-Nasr (United Arab Emirates)	0–1	(Qatar) El Jaish
	Report	Romarinho 9'

Al-Maktoum Stadium, Dubai
Attendance: 6,000
Referee: Kim Jong-hyeok (South Korea)

El Jaish won 4–0 on aggregate.

=== East Zone ===
23 August 2016
19:30 UTC+8

Shanghai SIPG (China)	0–0	(South Korea) Jeonbuk Hyundai Motors
	Report

Shanghai Stadium, Shanghai
Attendance: 33,378
Referee: Ben Williams (Australia)
13 September 2016
19:00 UTC+9

Jeonbuk Hyundai Motors (South Korea)	5–0	(China) Shanghai SIPG
Leonardo 52', 83' (pen.); Shi Ke 58' (o.g.); Lee Dong-gook 84', 89'	Report

Jeonju World Cup Stadium, Jeonju
Attendance: 27,351
Referee: Abdulrahman Al-Jassim (Qatar)

Jeonbuk Hyundai Motors won 5–0 on aggregate.

24 August 2016
19:30 UTC+9

FC Seoul (South Korea)	3–1	(China) Shandong Luneng
Damjanović 19'; Park Chu-young 31'; Adriano 69'	Report	Montillo 35'

Seoul World Cup Stadium, Seoul
Attendance: 16,044
Referee: Ravshan Irmatov (Uzbekistan)
14 September 2016
19:30 UTC+8

Shandong Luneng (China)	1–1	(South Korea) FC Seoul
Montillo 59'	Report	Yun Ju-tae 82'

Jinan Olympic Sports Center Stadium, Jinan
Attendance: 20,187
Referee: Mohd Amirul Izwan Yaacob (Malaysia)

FC Seoul won 4–2 on aggregate.

== Semi-finals ==
In the semi-finals, the two quarter-final winners from the West Zone play each other, and the two quarter-final winners from the East Zone play each other, with the order of legs determined by the quarter-final draw.

West Region
Team 1	Agg.	Team 2	1st leg	2nd leg
Al-Ain (United Arab Emirates)	5–3	(Qatar) El Jaish	3–1	2–2

East Region
Team 1	Agg.	Team 2	1st leg	2nd leg
Jeonbuk Hyundai Motors (South Korea)	5–3	(South Korea) FC Seoul	4–1	1–2

=== West Zone ===
27 September 2016
18:50 UTC+4

Al-Ain (United Arab Emirates)	3–1	(Qatar) El Jaish
Douglas 17'; O. Abdulrahman 22'; Caio 90+1'	Report	Rashidov 52' (pen.)

Hazza Bin Zayed Stadium, Al Ain
Attendance: 15,067
Referee: Peter Green (Australia)
18 October 2016
18:15 UTC+3

El Jaish (Qatar)	2–2	(United Arab Emirates) Al-Ain
Romarinho 67', 81'	Report	O. Abdulrahman 57'; M. Abdulrahman 90+3'

Abdullah bin Khalifa Stadium, Doha
Attendance: 5,105
Referee: Fahad Al-Mirdasi (Saudi Arabia)

Al-Ain won 5–3 on aggregate.

=== East Zone ===
28 September 2016
19:00 UTC+9

Jeonbuk Hyundai Motors (South Korea)	4–1	(South Korea) FC Seoul
Leonardo 22' (pen.), 40'; Lopes 26'; Kim Shin-wook 84'	Report	Ju Se-jong 46'

Jeonju World Cup Stadium, Jeonju
Attendance: 23,481
Referee: Nawaf Shukralla (Bahrain)
19 October 2016
19:30 UTC+9

FC Seoul (South Korea)	2–1	(South Korea) Jeonbuk Hyundai Motors
Adriano 38'; Ko Kwang-min 90+2'	Report	Lopes 59'

Seoul World Cup Stadium, Seoul
Attendance: 14,677
Referee: Alireza Faghani (Iran)

Jeonbuk Hyundai Motors won 5–3 on aggregate.

== Final ==
In the final, the two semi-final winners play each other, with the order of legs reversed from the previous season's final, with the team from the East Zone hosting the first leg, and the team from the West Zone hosting the second leg.

Team 1	Agg.	Team 2	1st leg	2nd leg
Jeonbuk Hyundai Motors (South Korea)	3–2	(United Arab Emirates) Al-Ain	2–1	1–1

19 November 2016
19:00 UTC+9

Jeonbuk Hyundai Motors (South Korea)	2–1	(United Arab Emirates) Al-Ain
Leonardo 70', 77' (pen.)	Report	Asprilla 63'

Jeonju World Cup Stadium, Jeonju
Attendance: 36,158
Referee: Ahmed Al-Kaf (Oman)
26 November 2016
18:25 UTC+4

Al-Ain (United Arab Emirates)	1–1	(South Korea) Jeonbuk Hyundai Motors
Lee Myung-joo 34'	Report	Han Kyo-won 30'

Hazza Bin Zayed Stadium, Al Ain
Attendance: 23,239
Referee: Ryuji Sato (Japan)

Jeonbuk Hyundai Motors won 3–2 on aggregate.
