= Tareq Al-Khodaim =

Emirati footballer (born 1990)

Personal information
- Full name: Tareq Ahmed Rashed Khameis Al-Khodaim Al-Antali
- Date of birth: 19 May 1990 (age 36)
- Place of birth: United Arab Emirates
- Height: 1.76 m (5 ft 9 in)
- Position: Midfielder

Youth career
- 2003–2007: Dibba Al-Fujairah
- 2007–2011: Al-Wasl

Senior career*
Years	Team	Apps	(Gls)
2011–2012	Al-Wasl	1	(0)
2012–2016	Dibba Al-Fujairah	77	(14)
2016–2019	Al-Wahda	39	(3)
2019–2021	Sharjah	6	(0)
2021	→ Khor Fakkan (loan)	8	(0)
2021–2022	Ajman	2	(0)
2023	Al-Dhafra	1	(0)
2023–2024	Dibba Al-Hisn		

International career^{‡}
2017–	United Arab Emirates	6	(1)
- * Club domestic league appearances and goals as of 1 January 2020 ‡ National team caps and goals as of 14 November 2017

Tareq Ahmed Rashed Khameis Al-Khodaim Al-Antali (Arabic:طارق الخديم) (born 19 May 1990) is an Emirati international footballer who plays as a midfielder.

== International career ==
=== International goals ===
Scores and results list the United Arab Emirates' goal tally first.

No	Date	Venue	Opponent	Score	Result	Competition
1.	7 June 2017	Shah Alam Stadium, Shah Alam, Malaysia	Laos	4–0	4–0	Friendly
