= Masoud Sulaiman =

Emirati footballer (born 1992)

Personal information
- Full name: Masoud Sulaiman Ahmed
- Date of birth: 16 June 1992 (age 34)
- Place of birth: Ruwais, United Arab Emirates
- Height: 1.80 m (5 ft 11 in)
- Position: Defender

Youth career
- Baniyas

Senior career*
| Years | Team | Apps | (Gls) |
| 2012–2016 | Baniyas | 22 | (1) |
| 2013–2014 | → Emirates Club (loan) | 19 | (0) |
| 2015–2019 | Al Nasr | 20 | (3) |
| 2019–2021 | Al Dhafra | 36 | (1) |
| 2021–2024 | Khor Fakkan | 40 | (1) |
| 2025 | Dibba Al-Hisn | 9 | (0) |

International career
| 2016 | United Arab Emirates | 1 | (0) |
- * Club domestic league appearances and goals

Masoud Sulaiman (Arabic:مسعود سليمان) (born 16 June 1992) is an Emirati footballer. He currently plays as a defender.

Sulaiman made his first appearance for the United Arab Emirates national football team in a friendly 1–0 loss to Syria.
