= Manea Mohammed =

Emirati footballer (born 1989)

Personal information
- Full name: Manea Mohammed Ali
- Date of birth: 19 June 1989 (age 37)
- Place of birth: United Arab Emirates
- Height: 1.73 m (5 ft 8 in)
- Position: Right back

Youth career
- Al Fujairah

Senior career*
Years	Team	Apps	(Gls)
2009–2012	Al Fujairah		
2012–2017	Al Shabab	91	(1)
2017–2020	Shabab Al-Ahli	4	(0)
2020	Al Wahda	0	(0)
- * Club domestic league appearances and goals

Manea Mohammed (Arabic:مانع محمد) (born 19 June 1989) is an Emirati footballer who plays as a right back.
