= Waleed Al-Yamahi =

Emirati footballer (born 1990)

Personal information
- Full name: Waleed Abdullah Al-Yamahi
- Date of birth: 19 November 1990 (age 35)
- Place of birth: United Arab Emirates
- Height: 1.65 m (5 ft 5 in)
- Position: Left-back

Youth career
- Al-Wahda

Senior career*
Years	Team	Apps	(Gls)
2010–2011	Al-Wahda	0	(0)
2011–2012	Al-Jazira	2	(0)
2012–2013	Al-Dhafra	6	(0)
2013–2014	Baniyas	9	(0)
2014–2017	Al-Fujairah	54	(1)
2017–2025	Ajman Club	123	(0)
- * Club domestic league appearances and goals

Waleed Al-Yamahi (Arabic:وليد اليماحي) (born 19 November 1990) is an Emirati footballer who plays as a left back.
