= Salem Al-Azizi =

Emirati association football player (born 1993)

Salem Al-Azizi سالم العزيزي
Personal information
- Full name: Salem Juma Awad Al-Azizi
- Date of birth: 25 February 1993 (age 33)
- Place of birth: United Arab Emirates
- Height: 1.73 m (5 ft 8 in)
- Position: Right back

Team information
- Current team: Al Wasl
- Number: 44

Youth career
- 2009–2013: Al Ain

Senior career*
Years	Team	Apps	(Gls)
2013–2017	Al Ain	12	(0)
2017–	Al Wasl	118	(1)
- * Club domestic league appearances and goals

Salem Al-Azizi (Arabic:سالم العزيزي) (born 25 February 1993) is an Emirati footballer. He currently plays as a right back for Al-Wasl.

== Career ==
=== Al-Ain ===
Al-Azizi started his career at Al Ain and is a product of the Al-Ain's youth system. On 20 December 2014, Al-Azizi made his professional debut for Al Ain against Al-Wasl in the Pro League, replacing Yassine El Ghanassy.

=== Al-Wasl ===
On 8 July 2017 left Al Ain and signed with Al-Wasl. On 16 September 2017, Al-Azizi made his professional debut for Al-Wasl against Al Ain in the Pro League.
