= Ahmed Al-Kaf =

Omani professional football referee (born 1983)

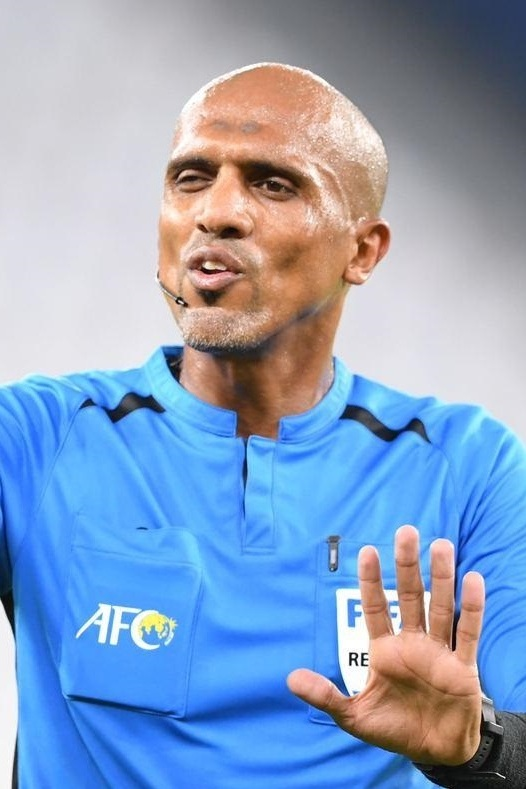
- Al-Kaf in 2020
- Full name: Ahmed Abu Bakar Said Al-Kaf
- Born: 6 March 1983 (age 43); Oman

Domestic
Years	League	Role
2008–	Omani League	Referee

International
Years	League	Role
2010–	FIFA-listed	Referee

Ahmed Abu Bakar Said Al-Kaf (Arabic: أحمد أبو بكر سعيد الكاف; born 6 March 1983) is an Omani professional football referee. He has been a full international for FIFA since 2012. He was the referee for the 2016 AFC Champions League final between Jeonbuk Hyundai Motors and Al Ain FC, the second round of the 2018 AFC Champions League Final, and the 2024 qualification match between Bahrain and Indonesia. In April 2025, it was reported that Al-Kaf was removed from the list of referees to officiate the 2025 FIFA Club World Cup.

== Early life and career ==
Ahmed Al-Kaf was born on 6 March 1983 in Oman. He graduated among the top three in the Future Referees Project, kickstarting his refereeing career. He also trained in the Premier League. After receiving his FIFA license in 2010, he became a full international two years later. Al-Kaf was one of 46 referees from the first and second divisions of Oman who participated in a football referees' camp located in Dhofar, which included fitness examinations and theoretical lectures. Al-Kaf was entrusted with officiating various international matches; he served as the referee of the AFC Champions League final three times, and the only Arab referee to do so, having officiated the 2016 AFC Champions League final match between South Korean team Jeonbuk Hyundai Motors and Emirati team Al Ain; the second round of the 2018 AFC Champions League Final; and the 2022 AFC Champions League final match between Al Hilal SFC and the Urawa Red Diamonds. Throughout his career, as of 9 October 2024, Al-Kaf has officiated 114 matches, issuing a total of 343 yellow cards and 10 red cards.

== Games officiated ==
=== 2018 AFC U-23 Championship final ===
The AFC had assigned Chinese referee Ma Ning to officiate the final match on 27 January 2018, but he was replaced by Al-Kaf a few hours before the final began. On 3 March, Al-Kaf and Abu Bakr Al-Omari were praised by Saad bin Mohammed bin Said Al-Mardhouf Al-Saadi, Minister of Sports Affairs, for their contributions made in their football refereeing careers. Al-Saadi cited Al-Kaf's officiation of the 2018 AFC U-23 Championship final as the main reason why he was chosen to receive this honor.

=== 2022 FIFA World Cup qualification ===
On 8 November 2019, it was reported that Al-Kaf would officiate the match between Thailand and Vietnam. He was nicknamed "national referee" and "Asian Collina" by Vietnamese football fans, who praised his calmness and neutrality during matches. During the match, Tien Dung passed Thai goalkeeper Manuel Bihr to score a goal, but Al-Kaf declared this incident a penalty, stating that Đoàn Văn Hậu had previously brought Bihr down in the box. The match resulted in a tie of 0–0, causing Thailand to lose their second place ranking to Malaysia.

=== 2020 AFC U-23 Championship ===
In January 2020, Al-Kaf was questioned for several dubious rulings made in the 2020 AFC U-23 Championship Quarter Finals between Saudi Arabia against host, Thailand. During the 78th minute of the game, he was accused of awarding Saudi Arabian footballer Abdullah Al-Hamdan a free kick just outside the box. The Football Association of Thailand sent an official letter to the Asian Football Confederation (AFC), questioning the fairness and integrity of officiating in the match. Afterwards, Al-Kaf later changed the free kick to a penalty after video assistant referees (VARs) confirmed it as such.

=== 2026 FIFA World Cup qualifier ===
On 14 February 2024, Al-Kaf was among the referees chosen to officiate the 2026 FIFA World Cup finals. On 10 October 2024, Al-Kaf came under heavy scrutiny after he was accused by Indonesian football players and the Football Association of Indonesia (PSSI) of making biased decisions in the match between Bahrain and Indonesia in the third round of the 2026 World Cup qualification; while the game was originally planned to go on for 6 more minutes, he allowed the game to continue for 9 additional minutes. This led to Mohamed Marhoon scoring a 2–2 equalizer with only 20 seconds remaining.

==== International response ====
As a result of Al-Kaf's decisions during the game, defender Shayne Pattynama nearly started a fight with Bahraini team members, leading to the referee team being escorted off the field by security. Al-Kaf's ruling was protested by Indonesian netizens, who coined the incorrect mathematical equation "90+6=99" as an inside joke.

The Oman Football Association (OFA) would later condemn the "use of threatening and intimidating language" towards Al-Kaf by Indonesian fans, demanding he be protected due to death threats while claiming that the association was looking into the incident with the relevant authorities. Additionally, Bahraini football players were subject to online harassment and hacking operations, according to the Bahrain Football Association, which the AFC was aware of. The PSSI later requested the AFC to assign referees from neutral zones for the World Cup qualifiers.

== Removals from duties ==
On 14 October 2024, Omani journalist Khamis Al-Balushi reported that Al-Kaf was removed from Asian Elite Champions League duties. In April 2025, Al-Kaf was removed from the list of referees officiating the 2025 FIFA Club World Cup. In response, the Chairman of the OFA contacted the President of the AFC to discuss the exclusion of Al-Kaf and the rest of the Omani referee team. In spite of these removals, Al-Kaf, along with other Omani referees, participated in the 2025 FIFA U-20 World Cup from 27 September to 19 October, and the 2026 AFC Champions League Elite final.

Preceded by (Uzbekistan) Ravshan Irmatov	AFC Champions League Second-leg Final referee 2018 (Oman) Ahmed Al-Kaf	Succeeded by (Uzbekistan) Valentin Kovalenko
