= Ali Moustafa =

Emirati association football player (born 1995)

Ali Moustafa عَلِيّ مُصْطَفَى
Personal information
- Full name: Ali Moustafa Mousa Al-Kaebi
- Date of birth: 1 May 1995 (age 31)
- Place of birth: Emirates
- Height: 1.78 m (5 ft 10 in)
- Position: Defender

Team information
- Current team: Al Dhaid
- Number: 4

Youth career
- –2016: Al Ain

Senior career*
Years	Team	Apps	(Gls)
2014–2017	Al Ain	0	(0)
2017–2023	Emirates	31	(0)
2023	Al Urooba	17	(0)
2023–2025	Al Dhafra		
2025–	Al Dhaid		
- * Club domestic league appearances and goals

Ali Moustafa Mousa Al-Kaebi (Arabic: عَلِيّ مُصْطَفَى مُوسَى الْكَعْبِيّ; born 1 May 1995) is an Emirati footballer. He currently plays for Al Dhaid as a defender.

== Career ==
=== Al Ain ===
Ali Moustafa started his career at Al Ain and is a product of the Al Ain's youth system.

=== Emirates Club ===
On 9 June 2017 left Al Ain and signed with Emirates Club, On 14 October 2017, Ali Moustafa made his professional debut for Emirates Club against Shabab Al-Ahli in the Pro League, replacing Park Jong-woo.
