= Dawood Ali =

Emirati footballer (born 1983)

Personal information
- Full name: Dawood Ali Shambih Jassem Al-Bloushi
- Date of birth: 29 December 1983 (age 42)
- Place of birth: Dubai, United Arab Emirates
- Height: 1.71 m (5 ft 7 in)
- Positions: Right-back; midfielder

Youth career
- –2004: Al Shabab

Senior career*
Years	Team	Apps	(Gls)
2004–2017	Al Shabab	202	(9)
2017	→ Al Ain (loan)	7	(0)
2017–2018	Shabab Al-Ahli	6	(0)
2018–2022	Ittihad Kalba	55	(0)
2022	Hatta	11	(0)
2022–2023	Masfout	10	(1)

International career
2015	United Arab Emirates	3	(1)
- * Club domestic league appearances and goals as of 14 March 2020

Dawood Ali Shambih Jassem Al-Bloushi (Arabic: داود علي شامبيه جاسم البلوشي; born 29 December 1983) is an Emirati international footballer who plays as a right-back or midfielder.

== International career ==
=== International goals ===
Scores and results list the United Arab Emirates' goal tally first.

No	Date	Venue	Opponent	Score	Result	Competition
1.	12 November 2015	Mohammed Bin Zayed Stadium, Abu Dhabi, United Arab Emirates	Timor-Leste	5–0	8–0	2018 FIFA World Cup qualification
