= Khaled Abdulrahman =

Saudi footballer (born 1988)

Personal information
- Full name: Khaled Abdulrahman Ahmed Al Raqi Al Amoudi
- Date of birth: 10 September 1988 (age 38)
- Place of birth: Riyadh, Saudi Arabia
- Height: 1.68 m (5 ft 6 in)
- Position: Left-back

Senior career*
Years	Team	Apps	(Gls)
2010–2019	Al Ain FC	83	(0)
Total		83	(0)
- * Club domestic league appearances and goals

Khaled Abdulrahman Ahmed Al Raqi Al Amoudi (Arabic: خالد عبدالرحمن أحمد الراقي العمودي; born 10 September 1988) is a Saudi former professional footballer. He is the brother of footballers Mohamed Abdulrahman and Omar Abdulrahman.
