= Yasser Matar =

Emirati footballer (born 1985)

Personal information
- Full name: Yasser Matar Ibrahim Al-Junaibi
- Date of birth: 20 September 1985 (age 41)
- Place of birth: United Arab Emirates
- Height: 1.80 m (5 ft 11 in)
- Position: Midfielder

Youth career
- Al-Wahda

Senior career*
Years	Team	Apps	(Gls)
2006–2009	Al Wahda	5	(1)
2009–2016	Al Jazira	65	(2)
2016	Al Ain	5	(0)
2016–2017	Fujairah	16	(2)
2018	Al Urooba	4	(0)
- * Club domestic league appearances and goals

Yasser Matar (Arabic:ياسر مطر) (born 20 September 1985) is a retired Emirati footballer who played as midfielder .
