= Mohammed Abdulrahman (footballer, born February 1989) =

Emirati footballer

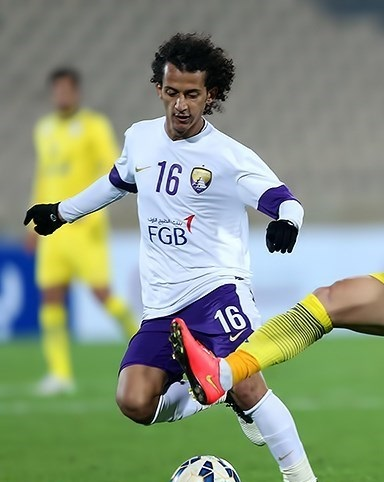

Personal information
- Full name: Mohammed Abdulrahman Ahmed Al Raqi Al Amoudi
- Date of birth: 4 February 1989 (age 37)
- Place of birth: Riyadh, Saudi Arabia
- Height: 1.72 m (5 ft 8 in)
- Position: Midfielder

Youth career
- 2006–2008: Al Ain

Senior career*
Years	Team	Apps	(Gls)
2008–2021	Al Ain	203	(23)
2021–2022	Al-Wasl	11	(0)

International career^{‡}
2010–2019	United Arab Emirates	46	(1)
- * Club domestic league appearances and goals as of 26 March 2017 ‡ National team caps and goals as of 29 January 2019

Mohammed Abdulrahman Ahmed Al Raqi Al Amoudi (Arabic: محمد عبد الرحمن أحمد الراقي العمودي; born 4 February 1989) is a former professional footballer who played as a midfielder. Born in Saudi Arabia, he represented the United Arab Emirates at international level.

== Personal life ==
Mohammed Abdulrahman is the brother of footballers Khaled Abdulrahman and Omar Abdulrahman.

== Career statistics ==
=== Club ===
Club	Season	League		League Cup		Super Cup		UPC		ACL (Note: Includes 3 match in play-off round.)		Other (Note: Includes the Arab Club Champions Cup, FIFA Club World Cup, Emirati-Moroccan Super Cup.)		Total	
Club	Season	Apps	Goals	Apps	Goals	Apps	Goals	Apps	Goals	Apps	Goals	Apps	Goals	Apps	Goals
Al Ain
Al Ain	2008–09	2	0	0	0	—		0	0	—				2	0
Al Ain	2009–10	8	2	5	1	—		1	0	3	0	—		17	3
Al Ain	2010–11	16	3	5	0	—		1	0	3	0	—		25	3
Al Ain	2011–12	18	0	1	0	—		2	1	—				21	1
Al Ain	2012–13	22	3	5	1	1	0	2	0	6	0	—		36	4
Al Ain	2013–14	19	1	4	3	—		1	0	12	3	—		36	7
Al Ain	2014–15	21	5	0	0	1	0	1	0	8	0	—		31	5
Al Ain	2015–16	21	3	0	0	1	0	3	1	13	1	1	0	39	5
Al Ain	2016–17	21	0	2	0	—		1	0	9	1	—		33	1
Al Ain	2017–18	14	1	1	0	—		4	0	7	0	—		26	1
Al Ain	2018–19	15	1	2	0	1	0	1	0	1	0	5 (Note: Three Appearances in FIFA Club World Cup, two appearances in Arab Club Champions Cup)	0	25	1
Al Ain	2019–20	15	2	5	2	—		2	0	4	0	—		26	4
Al Ain	2020–21	11	2	2	1	—		1	0	0	0	—		14	3
Total		203	23	32	8	4	0	20	2	66	5	6	0	331	38
Al-Wasl	2021–22	6	0	2	1	—		1	0	—				9	1
Career total		209	23	34	9	4	0	20	2	66	5	6	0	340	39

=== International ===
Scores and results list the United Arab Emirates' goal tally first.

No	Date	Venue	Opponent	Score	Result	Competition
1.	5 November 2015	Zayed Sports City Stadium, Abu Dhabi, United Arab Emirates	Turkmenistan	1–0	5–1	Friendly

== Honours ==
Club

Al Ain

- UAE Pro League
  - Winners: 2011–12, 2012–13, 2014–15, 2017–18
- UAE President's Cup
  - Winners: 2013–14
- UAE Super Cup
  - Winners: 2012, 2015
- UAE League Cup
  - Winners: 2017–18
- AFC Champions League
  - Runners-up: 2016
- FIFA Club World Cup
  - Runners-up: 2018

International

United Arab Emirates

- AFC Asian Cup
  - Third place: 2015
