= Anel Karabeg =

Bosnian footballer (born 1962)

Personal information
- Date of birth: 7 March 1962 (age 64)
- Place of birth: Mostar, FPR Yugoslavia
- Height: 1.79 m (5 ft 10 in)
- Position: Midfielder

Team information
- Current team: Šibenik (assistant)

Senior career*
Years	Team	Apps	(Gls)
1980–1989	Velež Mostar	162	(9)
1989–1990	Real Burgos	33	(0)
1990–1991	Eibar	28	(0)
1992–1993	Zadar	45	(2)
1994	Zagreb	9	(0)
1994–1995	Šibenik	44	(5)
1996	Osijek	7	(0)
1996–2001	Šibenik	131	(8)
Total		459	(24)

Managerial career
- 2007: Šibenik
- 2007–2008: Velež Mostar
- 2008: Imotski
- 2014: Al Dhafra
- 2018: Novigrad
- 2020–: Šibenik (assistant)
- * Club domestic league appearances and goals

Anel Karabeg (born 7 March 1962) is a Bosnian professional football manager and former player who is currently working as an assistant manager of Croatian First Football League club HNK Šibenik.

== Club career ==
His playing career started in the 1980s and lasted until 2001. Karabeg played mostly in the midfield and his duty was providing quality passes for the strikers.

== Honours ==
=== Player ===
Velež Mostar

- Yugoslav Cup: 1980–81, 1985–86
- Balkans Cup: 1980–81

Real Burgos

- Segunda División: 1989–90
