= Fawzi Fayez =

Emirati footballer (born 1987)

Personal information
- Full name: Fawzi Fayez Subait Khalifa Al-Alawi
- Date of birth: 14 July 1987 (age 39)
- Place of birth: United Arab Emirates
- Height: 1.68 m (5 ft 6 in)
- Position: Right back

Senior career*
Years	Team	Apps	(Gls)
2009–2018	Al Ain FC	61	(3)
2018–2020	Al-Sharjah	1	(0)
2020	→ Khor Fakkan (loan)	5	(0)
2020–2021	Khor Fakkan	29	(0)
2021–2022	Al Urooba	6	(0)
2022–2023	Al Jazirah Al-Hamra		
- * Club domestic league appearances and goals

Fawzi Fayez Subait Khalifa Alalawi (Arabic: فوزي فايز سبيت خليفة آل علوي; born 14 July 1987) is an Emirati footballer who plays as a right back.

He played 3 times at 2010 AFC Champions League.
