= Saeed Al-Menhali =

Emirati footballer (born 1994)

Personal information
- Full name: Saeed Musabbeh Salem Sari Al-Menhali
- Date of birth: 4 February 1994 (age 32)
- Place of birth: United Arab Emirates
- Height: 1.71 m (5 ft 7 in)
- Position: Left back

Youth career
- Al Ain

Senior career*
Years	Team	Apps	(Gls)
2014–2021	Al Ain	28	(0)
2019–2020	→ Ittihad Kalba (loan)	1	(0)
- * Club domestic league appearances and goals

Saeed Al-Menhali (Arabic:سعيد المنهالي) (born 4 February 1994) is an Emirati footballer. As of June 2020, he has made 29 appearances. He has been involved with the UAE Olympic national football team.
