= Rashed Muhayer =

Emirati footballer

Personal information
- Full name: Rashed Muhayer Saeed
- Date of birth: 20 February 1994 (age 32)
- Place of birth: United Arab Emirates
- Height: 1.88 m (6 ft 2 in)
- Position: Defender

Team information
- Current team: Al Bataeh
- Number: 37

Youth career
- Al-Ain

Senior career*
Years	Team	Apps	(Gls)
2013–2019	Al-Ain	31	(0)
2015–2016	→ Al-Wasl (loan)	4	(0)
2018–2019	→ Al Dhafra (loan)	19	(1)
2019–2023	Al Dhafra	31	(0)
2020–2022	→ Al Wahda (loan)	14	(0)
2023–	Al Bataeh	0	(0)
- * Club domestic league appearances and goals

Rashed Muhayer (Arabic: راشد مهير; born 20 February 1988) is an Emirati footballer who plays for Al Bataeh as a defender.
