= Saeed Al-Kathiri =

Emirati footballer (born 1988)

Saeed Al Kathiri
Personal information
- Full name: Saeed Salem Saleh Salem Al Kathiri
- Date of birth: 28 March 1988 (age 38)
- Place of birth: Abu Dhabi, United Arab Emirates
- Height: 1.83 m (6 ft 0 in)
- Position: Striker

Senior career*
Years	Team	Apps	(Gls)
2006–2014	Al Wahda	70	(13)
2014–2015	Al Wasl	16	(1)
2015–2017	Ain	44	(9)
2017–2023	Al Dhafra	46	(9)

International career
2010–2016	United Arab Emirates	21	(3)
- * Club domestic league appearances and goals

Saeed Salem Saleh Salem Al Kathiri, also called Saeed Al Kathiri (Arabic: سعيد الكثيري; born 28 March 1988 in Abu Dhabi, United Arab Emirates), is an Emirati footballer who plays as a defender. He has played for the United Arab Emirates national football team since 2010.

== Honours ==
United Arab Emirates

- Arabian Gulf Cup: 2013
- AFC Asian Cup third-place: 2015
