= Danilo Asprilla =

Colombian footballer (born 1989)

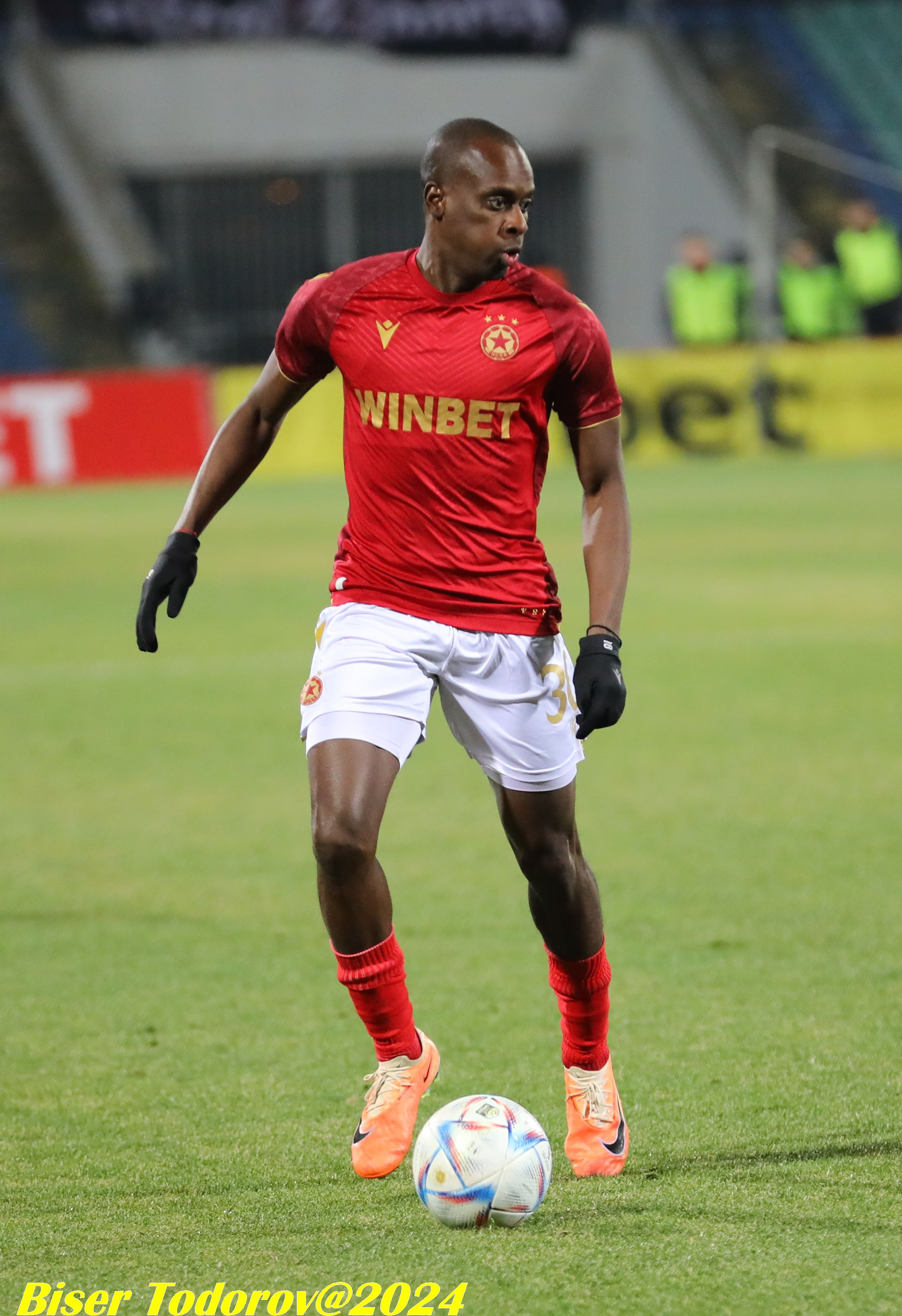
- Asprilla playing for CSKA Sofia in 2024

Personal information
- Full name: Danilo Moreno Asprilla
- Date of birth: 12 January 1989 (age 37)
- Place of birth: Medellín, Colombia
- Height: 1.80 m (5 ft 11 in)
- Position: Winger

Senior career*
Years	Team	Apps	(Gls)
2008–2009	Juventude	22	(4)
2009–2010	Al-Shahania	26	(7)
2010–2011	Deportivo Pereira	29	(9)
2011–2012	Rampla Juniors	27	(6)
2012–2013	Santa Fe	9	(1)
2013	Patriotas	15	(4)
2013–2015	Litex Lovech	59	(22)
2016–2019	Al Ain	26	(7)
2017–2019	→ Al-Fayha (loan)	51	(23)
2019–2020	Al-Shabab	29	(7)
2020–2021	Al-Qadsiah	17	(8)
2021–2022	Hapoel Be'er Sheva	32	(2)
2022–2023	Beitar Jerusalem	31	(17)
2023–2024	CSKA Sofia	24	(3)
2024–2025	Al-Safa	12	(4)
- * Club domestic league appearances and goals as of 16:26, 17 February 2025 (UTC)

Danilo Moreno Asprilla (born 12 January 1989) is a Colombian footballer who plays as a winger.

== Career ==
Asprilla began his career playing for Brazilian club Esporte Clube Juventude in 2008 and for Qatari club Al-Shahania Sports Club the next year. He returned to his native Colombia for the 2010 season, playing for the club Deportivo Pereira.

=== Litex Lovech ===
On 20 December 2013, Asprilla signed for Bulgarian club Litex Lovech. He marked his competitive debut by netting two goals in Litex's 3–0 league win over Beroe Stara Zagora on 23 February 2014.

=== Al Ain ===
On 4 January 2016 he moved to Al-Ain for an undisclosed fee. He made a debut on 8 January 2016 coming on as a substitute in the place of Ibrahim Diaky and scoring the winning goal in the 93 minute for 2–1 win against Al Dhafra FC.

=== Al-Shabab ===
Asprilla joined Al-Shabab in 2019. He scored his debut goal in the 2:1 win over Al Fateh in August 2019. Asprilla established himself as an important part of the side.

=== Al-Qadsiah ===
In October 2020, he moved to Al-Qadsiah.

=== CSKA Sofia ===
In July 2023, Asprilla returned to Bulgaria, joining CSKA Sofia. After mostly seeing action as a substitute, he left the team upon the expiration of his contract in June 2024.

== Career statistics ==
=== Club ===
As of match played 10 February 2025

Appearances and goals by club, season and competition
Club	Season	League			Cup		League cup		Continental		Other		Total	
Club	Season	Division	Apps	Goals	Apps	Goals	Apps	Goals	Apps	Goals	Apps	Goals	Apps	Goals
Rampla Juniors	2010–11	Uruguayan Primera División	6	2	0	0	—		—		—		6	2
Rampla Juniors	2011–12	Uruguayan Primera División	21	4	0	0	—		—		—		21	4
Rampla Juniors	Total		27	6	0	0	—		—		—		27	6
Santa Fe	2012	Categoría Primera A	3	0	0	0	—		—		—		3	0
Santa Fe	2013	Categoría Primera A	6	1	5	1	—		0	0	—		11	2
Santa Fe	Total		9	1	5	1	—		0	0	—		14	2
Patriotas Boyacá	2013	Categoría Primera A	15	4	0	0	—		—		—		15	4
Litex Lovech	2013–14	A Group	12	2	2	0	—		0	0	—		14	2
Litex Lovech	2014–15	A Group	29	10	5	1	—		3	1	—		37	12
Litex Lovech	2015–16	A Group	18	10	2	1	—		2	0	—		22	11
Litex Lovech	Total		59	22	9	2	—		5	1	—		73	25
Al Ain	2015–16	UAE Pro League	10	2	3	1	—		6	3	—		19	6
Al Ain	2016–17	UAE Pro League	16	5	2	0	5	3	12	2	—		35	10
Al Ain	Total		26	7	5	1	5	3	18	5	0	0	54	16
Al-Fayha	2017–18	Saudi Pro League	23	8	4	2	—		—		—		27	10
Al-Fayha	2018–19	Saudi Pro League	28	15	2	0	—		—		—		30	15
Al-Fayha	Total		51	23	6	2	—		—		—		57	25
Al-Shabab	2019–20	Saudi Pro League	29	7	2	0	—		—		6 (Note: Appearances in Arab Club Champions Cup)	4	37	11
Al-Qadsiah	2020–21	Saudi Pro League	17	8	1	0	—		—		0	0	18	8
Hapoel Be'er Sheva	2021–22	Israeli Premier League	32	3	4	0	2 (Note: Appearances in Toto Cup)	0	2	0	—		40	3
Beitar Jerusalem	2022–23	Israeli Premier League	31	17	5	1	0	0	3	0	—		39	18
CSKA Sofia	2023–24	First Professional Football League	24	3	4	2	—		1	0	—		29	5
Al Safa	2024–25	First Division League	12	4	1	1	—		—		—		13	5
Career Total			331	105	42	10	7	3	29	6	6	4	415	127

== Honours ==
Hapoel Be'er Sheva

- State Cup: 2021–22

Beitar Jerusalem

- State Cup: 2022–23
