= Lee Myung-joo =

South Korean footballer (born 1990)

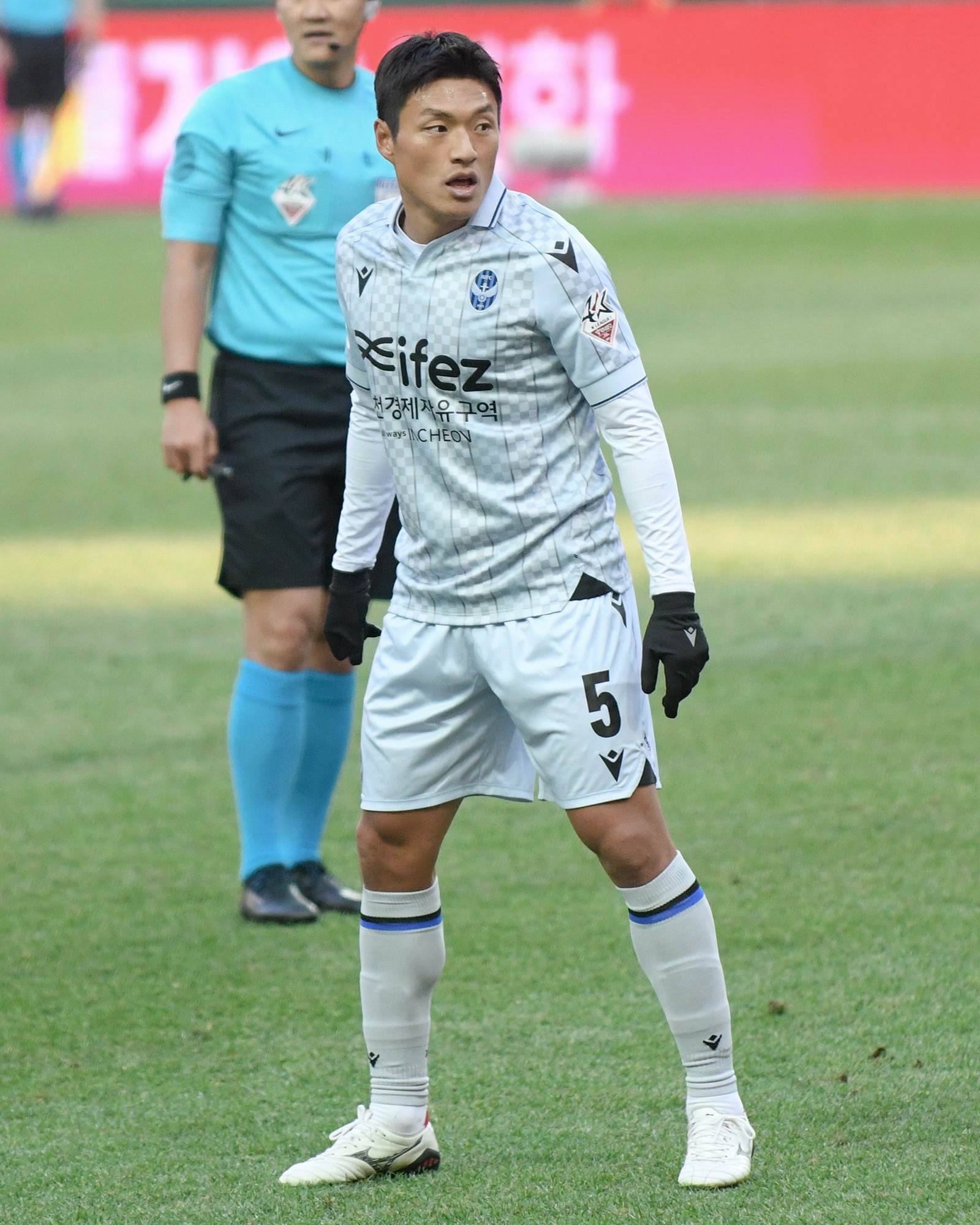
- Lee playing for Incheon United FC in 2023

Personal information
- Full name: Lee Myung-joo
- Date of birth: 24 April 1990 (age 36)
- Place of birth: Daegu, South Korea
- Height: 1.76 m (5 ft 9 in)
- Position: Central midfielder

Team information
- Current team: Incheon United
- Number: 5

Youth career
- 2006–2008: Pohang Technical High School
- 2010–2011: Yeungnam University

Senior career*
Years	Team	Apps	(Gls)
2012–2014	Pohang Steelers	80	(17)
2014–2017	Al Ain	70	(5)
2017–2019	FC Seoul	23	(3)
2018–2019	→ Asan Mugunghwa (draft) (Note: Serving a two-year mandatory military service.)	49	(7)
2020–2022	Al-Wahda	37	(3)
2022–	Incheon United	140	(9)

International career^{‡}
2011–2012	South Korea U23	2	(0)
2013–	South Korea	17	(1)
Medal record
Men's football
Representing South Korea
AFC Asian Cup
Runner-up	2015 Australia
- * Club domestic league appearances and goals as of 3 August 2026 ‡ National team caps and goals as of 12 December 2017

- Lee Myung-joo
- Hangul: 이명주
- Hanja: 李明柱
- RR: I Myeongju
- MR: I Myŏngju

Lee Myung-joo (born 24 April 1990) is a South Korean footballer who plays as a midfielder for Incheon United.

== Club career ==
=== Pohang Steelers ===
After a debut season with the Pohang Steelers, Lee was named as the K-League Rookie of the Year for 2012. In the 2013 season, he scored eight goals to contribute to Pohang's domestic league and cup double success. His performances were rewarded with his inclusion in the K League Classic Best XI for the 2013 season.

=== Al Ain ===
On 9 June 2014, Lee joined Al Ain FC, signing a three-year contract.

=== FC Seoul ===
On 19 June 2017, Lee joined FC Seoul, signing a six-month contract.

== International career ==
Lee made his debut in the South Korea national team on 11 June 2013 in a win against Uzbekistan in the 2014 FIFA World Cup qualification.

=== International goals ===
Scores and results list South Korea's goal tally first.

No	Date	Venue	Opponent	Score	Result	Competition
1.	5 September 2014	Bucheon Stadium, Bucheon, South Korea	Venezuela	1–1	3–1	Friendly

== Career statistics ==
As of match played 2 November 2025

Appearances and goals by club, season and competition
Club	Season	League			Cup		League Cup		Continental		Other		Total	
Club	Season	Division	Apps	Goals	Apps	Goals	Apps	Goals	Apps	Goals	Apps	Goals	Apps	Goals
Pohang Steelers	2012	K League	35	5	5	0	—		2	0	—		42	5
Pohang Steelers	2013	K League Classic	34	7	5	1	—		6	1	—		45	9
Pohang Steelers	2014	K League Classic	11	5	1	0	—		7	1	—		19	6
Pohang Steelers	Total		80	17	11	1	—		15	2	—		106	20
Al Ain	2014–15	UAE Pro League	23	2	1	0	2	1	12	1	1	0	39	4
Al Ain	2015–16	UAE Pro League	23	3	4	1	6	1	14	2	1	0	48	7
Al Ain	2016–17	UAE Pro League	24	0	2	0	5	0	8	1	—		39	1
Al Ain	Total		70	5	7	3	13	2	34	4	2	0	126	12
FC Seoul	2017	K League 1	13	2	—		—		—		—		13	2
FC Seoul	2019	K League 1	10	1	—		—		—		—		10	1
FC Seoul	Total		23	3	—		—		—		—		23	3
Asan Mugunghwa (draft)	2018	K League 2	30	5	2	1	—		—		—		32	6
Asan Mugunghwa (draft)	2019	K League 2	19	2	0	0	—		—		—		19	2
Asan Mugunghwa (draft)	Total		49	7	2	1	—		—		—		51	8
Al Wahda	2019–20	UAE Pro League	7	0	0	0	1	0	2	0	—		10	0
Al Wahda	2020–21	UAE Pro League	25	3	1	0	1	0	9	0	—		36	3
Al Wahda	2021–22	UAE Pro League	5	0	0	0	0	0	—		—		5	0
Al Wahda	Total		37	3	1	0	2	0	11	0	—		51	3
Incheon United	2022	K League 1	34	4	0	0	—		—		—		34	4
Incheon United	2023	K League 1	25	2	1	0	—		2	0	—		28	2
Incheon United	2024	K League 1	27	0	0	0	—		—		—		27	0
Incheon United	2025	K League 2	34	2	0	0	—		—		—		34	2
Incheon United	Total		120	8	1	0	—		2	0	—		123	8
Career total			379	43	22	3	15	2	62	6	2	0	480	54

== Honours ==
=== Club ===
Pohang Steelers

- K League 1 (1): 2013
- Korean FA Cup (2): 2012, 2013

Al Ain

- UAE Arabian Gulf League (1): 2014–15
- UAE Super Cup (1): 2015

Asan Mugunghwa

- K League 2 (1): 2018

=== International ===
South Korea

- EAFF East Asian Cup (1): 2017

=== Individual ===
- K-League Rookie of the Year Award: 2012
- K League 1 Best XI: 2013
- K League 2 Best XI: 2018, 2025
