= Guangzhou F.C. in international competitions =

Guangzhou F.C. was a Chinese professional football club based in Guangzhou. Their first participation in international competitions was during the 2012 season, when they competed in the AFC Champions League. Their first match was against Jeonbuk Hyundai Motors, won by Guangzhou 5–1.

Guangzhou won the AFC Champions League on two occasions, in 2013 and 2015.

== Matches ==
All results list Guangzhou's goal tally first.

Key

- (H) = Home
- (A) = Away
- (N) = Neutral

Season	Competition	Round	Opposition	Score
2012	AFC Champions League	Group stage	(South Korea) Jeonbuk Hyundai Motors	5–1 (A), 1–3 (H)
2012	AFC Champions League	Group stage	(Thailand) Buriram United	1–2 (H), 2–1 (A)
2012	AFC Champions League	Group stage	(Japan) Kashiwa Reysol	0–0 (A), 3–1 (H)
2012	AFC Champions League	Round of 16	(Japan) FC Tokyo	1–0 (H)
2012	AFC Champions League	Quarter-final	(Saudi Arabia) Al-Ittihad	2–4 (A), 2–1 (H)
2013	AFC Champions League	Group stage	(Japan) Urawa Red Diamonds	3–0 (H), 2–3 (A)
2013	AFC Champions League	Group stage	(South Korea) Jeonbuk Hyundai Motors	1–1 (A), 0–0 (H)
2013	AFC Champions League	Group stage	(Thailand) Muangthong United	4–0 (H), 4–1 (A)
2013	AFC Champions League	Round of 16	(Australia) Central Coast Mariners	2–1 (A), 3–0 (H)
2013	AFC Champions League	Quarter-final	(Qatar) Lekhwiya	2–0 (H), 4–1 (A)
2013	AFC Champions League	Semi-final	(Japan) Kashiwa Reysol	4–1 (A), 4–0 (H)
2013	AFC Champions League	Final	(South Korea) FC Seoul	2–2 (A), 1–1 (H) (Note: Won on away goals rule.)
2013	FIFA Club World Cup	Quarter-final	(Egypt) Al-Ahly	2–0 (N)
2013	FIFA Club World Cup	Semi-final	(Germany) Bayern Munich	0–3 (N)
2013	FIFA Club World Cup	Third place match	(Brazil) Atlético Mineiro	2–3 (N)
2014	AFC Champions League	Group stage	(Australia) Melbourne Victory	4–2 (H), 0–2 (A)
2014	AFC Champions League	Group stage	(Japan) Yokohama F. Marinos	1–1 (A), 2–1 (H)
2014	AFC Champions League	Group stage	(South Korea) Jeonbuk Hyundai Motors	3–1 (H), 0–1 (A)
2014	AFC Champions League	Round of 16	(Japan) Cerezo Osaka	5–1 (A), 0–1 (H)
2014	AFC Champions League	Quarter-final	(Australia) Western Sydney Wanderers	0–1 (A), 2–1 (H) (Note: Lost on away goals rule.)
2015	AFC Champions League	Group stage	(South Korea) FC Seoul	1–0 (H), 0–0 (A)
2015	AFC Champions League	Group stage	(Australia) Western Sydney Wanderers	3–2 (A), 0–2 (H)
2015	AFC Champions League	Group stage	(Japan) Kashima Antlers	4–3 (H), 1–2 (A)
2015	AFC Champions League	Round of 16	(South Korea) Seongnam FC	1–2 (A), 2–0 (H)
2015	AFC Champions League	Quarter-final	(Japan) Kashiwa Reysol	3–1 (A), 1–1 (H)
2015	AFC Champions League	Semi-final	(Japan) Gamba Osaka	2–1 (H), 0–0 (A)
2015	AFC Champions League	Final	(United Arab Emirates) Al-Ahli	0–0 (A), 1–0 (H)
2015	FIFA Club World Cup	Quarter-final	(Mexico) Club América	2–1 (N)
2015	FIFA Club World Cup	Semi-final	(Spain) Barcelona	0–3 (N)
2015	FIFA Club World Cup	Third place match	(Japan) Sanfrecce Hiroshima	1–2 (N)
2016	AFC Champions League	Group stage	(South Korea) Pohang Steelers	0–0 (H), 2–0 (A)
2016	AFC Champions League	Group stage	(Australia) Sydney FC	1–2 (A), 1–0 (H)
2016	AFC Champions League	Group stage	(Japan) Urawa Red Diamonds	2–2 (H), 0–1 (A)
2017	AFC Champions League	Group stage	(Hong Kong) Eastern	7–0 (H), 6–0 (A)
2017	AFC Champions League	Group stage	(South Korea) Suwon Samsung Bluewings	2–2 (H), 2–2 (A)
2017	AFC Champions League	Group stage	(Japan) Kawasaki Frontale	1–1 (H), 0–0 (A)
2017	AFC Champions League	Round of 16	(Japan) Kashima Antlers	1–0 (H), 1–2 (A)
2017	AFC Champions League	Quarter-final	(China) Shanghai SIPG	0–4 (A), 5–1 (H) (Note: Lost on penalties.)
2018	AFC Champions League	Group stage	(Thailand) Buriram United	1–1 (H), 1–1 (A)
2018	AFC Champions League	Group stage	(Japan) Cerezo Osaka	0–0 (A), 3–1 (H)
2018	AFC Champions League	Group stage	(South Korea) Jeju United	5–3 (H), 2–0 (A)
2018	AFC Champions League	Round of 16	(China) Tianjin Quanjian	0–0 (A), 2–2 (H)
2019	AFC Champions League	Group stage	(Japan) Sanfrecce Hiroshima	2–0 (H), 0–1 (A)
2019	AFC Champions League	Group stage	(South Korea) Daegu FC	1–3 (A), 1–0 (H)
2019	AFC Champions League	Group stage	(Australia) Melbourne Victory	4–0 (H), 1–1 (A)
2019	AFC Champions League	Round of 16	(China) Shandong Luneng	2–1 (H), 2–3 (A) (Note: Won on penalties.)
2019	AFC Champions League	Quarter-final	(Japan) Kashima Antlers	0–0 (H), 1–1 (A)
2019	AFC Champions League	Semi-final	(Japan) Urawa Red Diamonds	0–2 (A), 0–1 (H)
2020	AFC Champions League	Group stage (Note: All group stage matches were held in Qatar due to the COVID-19 pandemic.)	(Malaysia) Johor Darul Ta'zim	Cancelled
2020	AFC Champions League	Group stage	(South Korea) Suwon Samsung Bluewings	0–0, 1–1
2020	AFC Champions League	Group stage	(Japan) Vissel Kobe	1–3, 2–0
2021	AFC Champions League	Group stage (Note: All group stage matches were held in Thailand due to the COVID-19 pandemic. Guangzhou played with their reserve team.)	(Japan) Cerezo Osaka	0–2, 0–5
2021	AFC Champions League	Group stage	(Thailand) Port	0–3, 1–5
2021	AFC Champions League	Group stage	(Hong Kong) Kitchee	0–1, 0–1
2022	AFC Champions League	Group stage (Note: All group stage matches were held in Malaysia due to the COVID-19 pandemic. Guangzhou played with their reserve team.)	(Malaysia) Johor Darul Ta'zim	0–5, 0–2
2022	AFC Champions League	Group stage	(Japan) Kawasaki Frontale	0–8, 0–1
2022	AFC Champions League	Group stage	(South Korea) Ulsan Hyundai	0–3, 0–5

== Statistics ==
As of 30 April 2022

=== By competition ===
Competition	Pld	W	D	L	GF	GA	GD	Win%
AFC Champions League	99	40	26	33	153	133	+20	40.40
FIFA Club World Cup	6	2	0	4	7	12	−5	33.33

=== By season ===
Season	Competition	Pld	W	D	L	GF	GA	GD	Win%	Round
2012	AFC Champions League	9	5	1	3	17	13	+4	55.56	Quarter-finals
2013	AFC Champions League	14	9	4	1	36	11	+25	64.29	Winners
2013	FIFA Club World Cup	3	1	0	2	4	6	−2	33.33	Fourth place
2014	AFC Champions League	10	5	1	4	17	12	+5	50.00	Quarter-finals
2015	AFC Champions League	14	7	4	3	19	14	+5	50.00	Winners
2015	FIFA Club World Cup	3	1	0	2	3	6	−3	33.33	Fourth place
2016	AFC Champions League	6	2	2	2	6	5	+1	33.33	Group stage
2017	AFC Champions League	10	4	4	2	25	12	+13	40.00	Quarter-finals
2018	AFC Champions League	8	3	5	0	14	8	+6	37.50	Round of 16
2019	AFC Champions League	12	4	3	5	14	13	+1	33.33	Semi-finals
2020	AFC Champions League	4	1	2	1	4	4	+0	25.00	Group stage
2021	AFC Champions League	6	0	0	6	1	17	−16	0.00	Group stage
2022	AFC Champions League	6	0	0	6	0	24	−24	0.00	Group stage

=== By nation ===
Nation	Pld	W	D	L	GF	GA	GD	Win%
Australia	12	7	1	4	21	14	+7	58.33
Brazil	1	0	0	1	2	3	−1	0.00
China	6	2	2	2	11	11	+0	33.33
Egypt	1	1	0	0	2	0	+2	100.00
Germany	1	0	0	1	0	3	−3	0.00
Hong Kong	4	2	0	2	13	2	+11	50.00
Japan	38	14	10	14	51	50	+1	36.84
Malaysia	2	0	0	2	0	7	−7	0.00
Mexico	1	1	0	0	2	1	+1	100.00
Qatar	2	2	0	0	6	1	+5	100.00
Saudi Arabia	2	1	0	1	4	5	−1	50.00
South Korea	24	8	10	6	33	31	+2	33.33
Spain	1	0	0	1	0	3	−3	0.00
Thailand	8	3	2	3	14	14	+0	37.50
United Arab Emirates	2	1	1	0	1	0	+1	50.00

== See also ==
- Chinese clubs in the AFC Champions League
