= Guangzhou City F.C. in international competitions =

== Matches ==
#	Season	Competition	Date	Round	Opponent	H / A	Stadium	Result
1	2015	AFC Champions League	2015-02-10	Preliminary round 2	(Singapore) Warriors	H	Yuexiushan Stadium	3-0
2	2015	AFC Champions League	2015-02-17	Play-off round	(Australia) Central Coast Mariners	A	Central Coast Stadium	3-1
3	2015	AFC Champions League	2015-02-24	Group stage	(Japan) Gamba Osaka	A	Osaka Expo '70 Stadium	2-0
4	2015	AFC Champions League	2015-03-03	Group stage	(Thailand) Buriram United	H	Yuexiushan Stadium	1-2
5	2015	AFC Champions League	2015-03-17	Group stage	(South Korea) Seongnam	H	Yuexiushan Stadium	0-1
6	2015	AFC Champions League	2015-04-07	Group stage	(South Korea) Seongnam	A	Tancheon Sports Complex	0-0
7	2015	AFC Champions League	2015-04-22	Group stage	(Japan) Gamba Osaka	H	Yuexiushan Stadium	0-5
8	2015	AFC Champions League	2015-05-06	Group stage	(Thailand) Buriram United	A	New I-Mobile Stadium	0-5

== Statistics ==
=== By competition ===
Competition	Pld	W	D	L	GF	GA	GD	Win%
AFC Champions League	8	3	1	4	9	14	−5	37.50

=== By season ===
Season	Competition	Pld	W	D	L	GF	GA	GD	Win%	Round
2015	AFC Champions League	8	3	1	4	9	14	−5	37.50	Group stage

=== By nation ===
Nation	Pld	W	D	L	GF	GA	GD	Win%
Australia	1	1	0	0	3	1	+2	100.00
Japan	2	1	0	1	2	5	−3	50.00
Singapore	1	1	0	0	3	0	+3	100.00
South Korea	2	0	1	1	0	1	−1	0.00
Thailand	2	0	0	2	1	7	−6	0.00

== Records ==
- Most appearances in Asian competition: Míchel, 8
- Most goals in Asian competition: Lu Lin, 2
- First Asian match: Guangzhou R&F 3–0 Warriors, AFC Champions League, preliminary round 2, 10 February 2015
- First goal scored in Asia: Jiang Zhipeng, against Warriors, in the AFC Champions League, 10 February 2015
- Biggest win: Guangzhou R&F 3–0 Warriors, in the AFC Champions League, 10 February 2015
- Biggest defeat:
  Guangzhou R&F 0–5 Gamba Osaka, in the AFC Champions League, 22 April 2015
  Buriram United 5–0 Guangzhou R&F, in the AFC Champions League, 6 May 2015
- Highest Asian home attendance: 9,308, against Buriram United, in the 2015 AFC Champions League, 3 March 2015
- Lowest Asian home attendance: 7,883, against Warriors, in the 2015 AFC Champions League, 10 February 2015

== Goalscorers ==
Rank	Player	Position	Goals
1	(China) Lu Lin	MF	2
2	(China) Jiang Zhipeng	DF	1
2	(South Korea) Jang Hyun-soo	DF	1
2	(China) Zhang Shuo	FW	1
2	(China) Jiang Ning	FW	1
2	(Morocco) Abderrazak Hamdallah	FW	1
2	(China) Wang Song	MF	1
#	Own goal		1

== See also ==
- Chinese clubs in the AFC Champions League
