= Chinese football clubs in Asian competitions =

Records of the Chinese clubs in the AFC Champions League.This details the participation and performances in the competition since its based at 2002 as a result of the merger between the Asian Club Championship, the Asian Cup Winners' Cup and the Asian Super Cup.

== Overview ==
Participation	Appearance	2003	2004	2005	2006	2007	2008	2009	2010	2011	2012	2013	2014	2015	2016	2017	2018	2019	2020
Shandong Luneng	9			Q		G		G	G	G			G	G	Q			16	
Shanghai Shenhua	8	G	G		Q	G		G		G						PO	G		
Beijing Guoan	8						G	G	16		G	16	G	16				G	
Guangzhou Evergrande	8										Q	C	Q	C	G	Q	16	S	
Shanghai SIPG	4														Q	S	16	Q	
Dalian Shide	3	S	Q		G														
Tianjin Teda	3							G		16	G								
Jiangsu FC	3											G			G	16			
Changchun Yatai	2						G		G										
Guizhou Renhe	2											G	G						
Shenzhen Jianlibao	1			S															
Henan Construction	1								G										
Hangzhou Greentown	1									G									
Guangzhou R&F	1													G					
Tianjin Quanjian	1																Q		

Legend

- Q : Qualified
- W : Withdrew
- P : Preliminary round
- PO : Qualifying play-off round
- G : Group stage
- 16 : Round of 16
- Q : Quarter-finals
- S : Semi-finals
- R : Runners-Up
- C : Champions

== Statistics ==
Including Qualifying rounds: as of 10 April 2019

=== Statistics by clubs ===
#	Team	Pld.	W	D	L	GF	GA	GD	Pts.
1	Guangzhou Evergrande	74	37	21	16	141	78	+63	132
2	Shandong Luneng Taishan	60	26	14	20	106	90	+16	92
3	Beijing Guoan	52	17	17	18	61	54	+7	68
4	Shanghai SIPG	36	20	5	11	62	48	+14	65
5	Shanghai Shenhua	42	13	11	18	59	63	−4	50
6	Dalian Shide	19	12	2	5	35	22	+13	38
7	Jiangsu Suning	20	9	4	7	27	25	+2	31
8	Tianjin Teda	19	5	6	8	16	26	−10	21
9	Tianjin Quanjian	11	5	3	3	19	18	+1	18
10	Shenzhen Jianlibao	10	5	2	3	13	12	+1	17
11	Changchun Yatai	12	4	3	5	20	10	+10	15
12	Guangzhou R&F	8	3	1	4	9	14	−5	10
13	Guizhou Renhe	12	2	4	6	10	17	−7	10
14	Hangzhou Greentown	6	1	2	3	3	6	−3	5
15	Henan Construction	6	0	3	3	3	8	−5	3
Total		387	159	98	130	584	491	+93	575

=== Statistics by season ===
Season	Pld	W	D	L	GF	GA	GD	Pts
2002–03	12	7	1	4	33	21	+12	22
2004	14	8	1	5	19	16	+3	25
2005	18	11	3	4	31	22	+9	36
2006	10	7	0	3	17	13	+4	21
2007	12	5	3	4	19	12	+7	18
2008	12	7	3	2	24	12	+12	24
2009	24	7	7	10	29	27	+2	28
2010	25	6	4	15	25	30	−5	22
2011	25	6	6	13	23	36	−13	24
2012	21	5	7	9	25	36	−11	22
2013	34	14	12	8	52	33	+19	54
2014	29	9	7	13	41	41	0	34
2015	37	16	9	12	51	50	+1	57
2016	35	15	11	9	51	40	+11	56
2017	32	17	5	10	66	41	+25	56
2018	34	13	15	6	53	44	+9	54
2019	35	12	13	10	52	43	+9	49
2020	26	13	4	9	35	35	0	46
2021	13	0	1	12	4	41	-37	1
2022	12	0	1	11	2	48	-46	1
Total	460	178	113	169	652	641	+11	647

== Finals ==
Performance by clubs
Club	Winners	Runners-up	Years won	Years runners-up
Guangzhou Evergrande	2	0	2013, 2015	
Liaoning	1	1	1989–90	1990–91
Dalian Shide	0	1		1997–98

== Statistics by club ==
Match won	Match drawn	Match lost

=== Beijing Guoan ===
Beijing Guoan statistics
Team	Pld	W	D	L	GF	GA	GD	Pts
(China) Beijing Guoan	52	17	17	18	61	54	+7	68

Beijing Guoan results
No	Season	Round	Result	Opponent	Venue
1	2008	Group stage			
1	2008	Group stage	3 – 1	(Vietnam) Nam Dinh	Mỹ Đình National Stadium, Hanoi, Vietnam
2	2008	Group stage			
2	2008	Group stage	4 – 2	(Thailand) Krung Thai Bank	Workers' Stadium, Beijing, China
3	2008	Group stage			
3	2008	Group stage	0 – 1	(Japan) Kashima Antlers	Kashima Soccer Stadium, Kashima, Japan
4	2008	Group stage			
4	2008	Group stage	1 – 0	(Japan) Kashima Antlers	Workers' Stadium, Beijing, China
5	2008	Group stage			
5	2008	Group stage	3 – 0	(Vietnam) Nam Dinh	Workers' Stadium, Beijing, China
6	2008	Group stage			
6	2008	Group stage	3 – 5	(Thailand) Krung Thai Bank	Rajamangala National Stadium, Bangkok, Thailand
7	2009	Group stage			
7	2009	Group stage	2 – 0	(Australia) Newcastle United Jets	Workers' Stadium, Beijing, China
8	2009	Group stage			
8	2009	Group stage	0 – 0	(Japan) Nagoya Grampus	Paloma Mizuho Stadium, Nagoya, Japan
9	2009	Group stage			
9	2009	Group stage	0 – 1	(South Korea) Ulsan Hyundai Horang-i	Ulsan Munsu Football Stadium, Ulsan, South Korea
10	2009	Group stage			
10	2009	Group stage	0 – 1	(South Korea) Ulsan Hyundai Horang-i	Workers' Stadium, Beijing, China
11	2009	Group stage			
11	2009	Group stage	1 – 2	(Australia) Newcastle United Jets	Newcastle International Sports Centre, Newcastle, Australia
12	2009	Group stage			
12	2009	Group stage	1 – 1	(Japan) Nagoya Grampus	Workers' Stadium, Beijing, China
13	2010	Group stage			
13	2010	Group stage	1 – 0	(Australia) Melbourne Victory	Workers' Stadium, Beijing, China
14	2010	Group stage			
14	2010	Group stage	3 – 1	(Japan) Kawasaki Frontale	Todoroki Athletics Stadium, Kawasaki, Japan
15	2010	Group stage			
15	2010	Group stage	1 – 3	(South Korea) Seongnam Ilhwa Chunma	Tancheon Sports Complex, Seongnam, South Korea
16	2010	Group stage			
16	2010	Group stage	0 – 1	(South Korea) Seongnam Ilhwa Chunma	Workers' Stadium, Beijing, China
17	2010	Group stage			
17	2010	Group stage	0 – 0	(Australia) Melbourne Victory	Docklands Stadium, Melbourne, Australia
18	2010	Group stage			
18	2010	Group stage	2 – 0	(Japan) Kawasaki Frontale	Workers' Stadium, Beijing, China
19	2010				
19	2010	Round of 16	0 – 2	(South Korea) Suwon Samsung Bluewings	Suwon World Cup Stadium, Suwon, South Korea
20	2012	Group stage			
20	2012	Group stage	1 – 2	(South Korea) Ulsan Hyundai	Ulsan Munsu Football Stadium, Ulsan, South Korea
21	2012	Group stage			
21	2012	Group stage	1 – 1	(Australia) Brisbane Roar	Workers' Stadium, Beijing, China
22	2012	Group stage			
22	2012	Group stage	1 – 1	(Japan) FC Tokyo	Workers' Stadium, Beijing, China
23	2012	Group stage			
23	2012	Group stage	0 – 3	(Japan) FC Tokyo	Ajinomoto Stadium, Tokyo, Japan
24	2012	Group stage			
24	2012	Group stage	2 – 3	(South Korea) Ulsan Hyundai	Workers' Stadium, Beijing, China
25	2012	Group stage			
25	2012	Group stage	1 – 1	(Australia) Brisbane Roar	Lang Park, Brisbane, Australia
26	2013	Group stage			
26	2013	Group stage	0 – 0	(South Korea) Pohang Steelers	Pohang Steel Yard, Pohang, South Korea
27	2013	Group stage			
27	2013	Group stage	2 – 1	(Japan) Sanfrecce Hiroshima	Workers' Stadium, Beijing, China
28	2013	Group stage			
28	2013	Group stage	0 – 0	(Uzbekistan) Bunyodkor	Bunyodkor Stadium, Tashkent, Uzbekistan
29	2013	Group stage			
29	2013	Group stage	0 – 1	(Uzbekistan) Bunyodkor	Workers' Stadium, Beijing, China
30	2013	Group stage			
30	2013	Group stage	2 – 0	(South Korea) Pohang Steelers	Workers' Stadium, Beijing, China
31	2013	Group stage			
31	2013	Group stage	0 – 0	(Japan) Sanfrecce Hiroshima	Hiroshima Big Arch, Hiroshima, Japan
32	2013				
32	2013	Round of 16	0 – 0	(South Korea) FC Seoul	Workers' Stadium, Beijing, China
33	2013	Round of 16			
33	2013	Round of 16	1 – 3	(South Korea) FC Seoul	Seoul World Cup Stadium, Seoul, South Korea
34	2014	Qualification stage			
34	2014	Qualification stage	4 – 0	(Thailand) Chonburi	Workers' Stadium, Beijing, China
35	2014				
35	2014	Group stage	1 – 1	(Japan) Sanfrecce Hiroshima	Hiroshima Big Arch, Hiroshima, Japan
36	2014	Group stage			
36	2014	Group stage	1 – 1	(South Korea) FC Seoul	Workers' Stadium, Beijing, China
37	2014	Group stage			
37	2014	Group stage	2 – 1	(Australia) Central Coast Mariners	Workers' Stadium, Beijing, China
38	2014	Group stage			
38	2014	Group stage	0 – 1	(Australia) Central Coast Mariners	Central Coast Stadium, Gosford, Australia
39	2014	Group stage			
39	2014	Group stage	2 – 2	(Japan) Sanfrecce Hiroshima	Workers' Stadium, Beijing, China
40	2014	Group stage			
40	2014	Group stage	1 – 2	(South Korea) FC Seoul	Seoul World Cup Stadium, Seoul, South Korea
41	2015	Qualification stage			
41	2015	Qualification stage	3 – 0	(Thailand) Bangkok Glass	Workers' Stadium, Beijing, China
42	2015				
42	2015	Group stage	1 – 0	(Australia) Brisbane Roar	Robina Stadium, Gold Coast, Australia
43	2015	Group stage			
43	2015	Group stage	1 – 0	(South Korea) Suwon Samsung Bluewings	Workers' Stadium, Beijing, China
44	2015	Group stage			
44	2015	Group stage	2 – 0	(Japan) Urawa Red Diamonds	Workers' Stadium, Beijing, China
45	2015	Group stage			
45	2015	Group stage	1 – 1	(Japan) Urawa Red Diamonds	Saitama Stadium 2002, Saitama, Japan
46	2015	Group stage			
46	2015	Group stage	0 – 1	(Australia) Brisbane Roar	Workers' Stadium, Beijing, China
47	2015	Group stage			
47	2015	Group stage	1 – 1	(South Korea) Suwon Samsung Bluewings	Suwon World Cup Stadium, Suwon, South Korea
48	2015	Group stage			
48	2015	Round of 16	1 – 1	(South Korea) Jeonbuk Hyundai Motors	Jeonju World Cup Stadium, Jeonju, South Korea
49	2015	Round of 16			
49	2015	Round of 16	0 – 1	(South Korea) Jeonbuk Hyundai Motors	Workers' Stadium, Beijing, China
50	2019	Group stage			
50	2019	Group stage	1 – 3	(South Korea) Jeonbuk Hyundai Motors	Jeonju World Cup Stadium, Jeonju, South Korea
51	2019	Group stage			
51	2019	Group stage	0 – 0	(Japan) Urawa Red Diamonds	Workers' Stadium, Beijing, China
52	2019	Group stage			
52	2019	Group stage	3 – 1	(Thailand) Buriram United	Chang Arena, Buriram, Thailand
53	2019	Group stage			
53	2019	Group stage	–	(Thailand) Buriram United	Workers' Stadium, Beijing, China
54	2019	Group stage			
54	2019	Group stage	–	(South Korea) Jeonbuk Hyundai Motors	Workers' Stadium, Beijing, China
55	2019	Group stage			
55	2019	Group stage	–	(Japan) Urawa Red Diamonds	Saitama Stadium 2002, Saitama, Japan

=== Changchun Yatai ===
Changchun Yatai statistics
Team	Pld	W	D	L	GF	GA	GD	Pts
(China) Changchun Yatai	12	4	3	5	20	10	+10	15

Changchun Yatai results
No	Season	Round	Result	Opponent	Venue
1	2008	Group stage			
1	2008	Group stage	2 – 1	(Vietnam) Bình Dương	Changchun Stadium, Changchun, China
2	2008	Group stage			
2	2008	Group stage	0 – 0	(Australia) Adelaide United	Hindmarsh Stadium, Adelaide, Australia
3	2008	Group stage			
3	2008	Group stage	1 – 0	(South Korea) Pohang Steelers	Changchun Stadium, Changchun, China
4	2008	Group stage			
4	2008	Group stage	2 – 2	(South Korea) Pohang Steelers	Pohang Steel Yard, Pohang, South Korea
5	2008	Group stage			
5	2008	Group stage	5 – 0	(Vietnam) Bình Dương	Gò Đậu Stadium, Thủ Dầu Một, Vietnam
6	2008	Group stage			
6	2008	Group stage	0 – 0	(Australia) Adelaide United	Changchun Stadium, Changchun, China
7	2010	Group stage			
7	2010	Group stage	0 – 1	(Japan) Kashima Antlers	Kashima Soccer Stadium, Kashima, Japan
8	2010	Group stage			
8	2010	Group stage	9 – 0	(Indonesia) Persipura Jayapura	Changchun Stadium, Changchun, China
9	2010	Group stage			
9	2010	Group stage	1 – 2	(South Korea) Jeonbuk Hyundai Motors	Changchun Stadium, Changchun, China
10	2010	Group stage			
10	2010	Group stage	0 – 1	(South Korea) Jeonbuk Hyundai Motors	Jeonju World Cup Stadium, Jeonju, South Korea
11	2010	Group stage			
11	2010	Group stage	0 – 1	(Japan) Kashima Antlers	Changchun Stadium, Changchun, China
12	2010	Group stage			
12	2010	Group stage	0 – 2	(Indonesia) Persipura Jayapura	Gelora Bung Karno Stadium, Jakarta, Indonesia

=== Dalian Shide ===
Dalian Shide statistics
Team	Pld	W	D	L	GF	GA	GD	Pts
(China) Dalian Shide	19	12	2	5	35	22	+13	38

Dalian Shide results
No	Season	Round	Result	Opponent	Venue
1	2002–03	Group stage			
1	2002–03	Group stage	0 – 0	(Japan) Shimizu S-Pulse	People's Stadium, Dalian, China
2	2002–03	Group stage			
2	2002–03	Group stage	7 – 1	(Thailand) Osotsapa FC	People's Stadium, Dalian, China
3	2002–03	Group stage			
3	2002–03	Group stage	3 – 1	(South Korea) Seongnam Ilhwa Chunma	People's Stadium, Dalian, China
4	2002–03				
4	2002–03	Semi-finals	2 – 4	(United Arab Emirates) Al Ain	Tahnoun bin Mohammed Stadium, Ain, UAE
5	2002–03	Semi-finals			
5	2002–03	Semi-finals	4 – 3	(United Arab Emirates) Al Ain	People's Stadium, Dalian, China
6	2004	Group stage			
6	2004	Group stage	2 – 0	(Thailand) Krung Thai Bank	Thai-Japanese Stadium, Bangkok, Thailand
7	2004	Group stage			
7	2004	Group stage	2 – 0	(Vietnam) Hoàng Anh Gia Lai	Chengdu Sports Centre, Chengdu, China
8	2004	Group stage			
8	2004	Group stage	1 – 0	(Indonesia) PSM Makassar	Andi Mattalata Stadium, Makassar, Indonesia
9	2004	Group stage			
9	2004	Group stage	2 – 1	(Indonesia) PSM Makassar	People's Stadium, Dalian, China
10	2004	Group stage			
10	2004	Group stage	3 – 1	(Thailand) Krung Thai Bank	People's Stadium, Dalian, China
11	2004	Group stage			
11	2004	Group stage	1 – 3	(Vietnam) Hoang Anh Gia Lai	Pleiku Stadium, Pleiku, Vietnam
12	2004				
12	2004	Quarter-finals	1 – 1	(Saudi Arabia) Al Ittihad	People's Stadium, Dalian, China
13	2004	Quarter-finals			
13	2004	Quarter-finals	0 – 1	(Saudi Arabia) Al Ittihad	Prince Abdullah Al Faisal Stadium, Jeddah, Saudi Arabia
14	2006	Group stage			
14	2006	Group stage	2 – 0	(Vietnam) Đà Nẵng	Da Nang, Vietnam
15	2006	Group stage			
15	2006	Group stage	1 – 0	(South Korea) Jeonbuk Hyundai Motors	Jinzhou Stadium, Dalian, China
16	2006	Group stage			
16	2006	Group stage	0 – 3	(Japan) Gamba Osaka	Expo '70 Stadium, Suita, Japan
17	2006	Group stage			
17	2006	Group stage	2 – 0	(Japan) Gamba Osaka	Jinzhou Stadium, Dalian, China
18	2006	Group stage			
18	2006	Group stage	1 – 0	(Vietnam) Đà Nẵng	Jinzhou Stadium, Dalian, China
19	2006	Group stage			
19	2006	Group stage	1 – 3	(South Korea) Jeonbuk Hyundai Motors	Jeonju World Cup Stadium, Jeonju, South Korea

=== Guangzhou Evergrande ===
Guangzhou Evergrande statistics
Team	Pld	W	D	L	GF	GA	GD	Pts
(China) Guangzhou Evergrande	74	37	21	16	141	78	+63	132

Guangzhou Evergrande results
No	Season	Round	Result	Opponent	Venue
1	2012	Group stage			
1	2012	Group stage	5 – 1	(South Korea) Jeonbuk Hyundai Motors	Jeonju World Cup Stadium, Jeonju, South Korea
2	2012	Group stage			
2	2012	Group stage	1 – 2	(Thailand) Buriram United	Tianhe Sports Centre Stadium, Guangzhou, China
3	2012	Group stage			
3	2012	Group stage	0 – 0	(Japan) Kashiwa Reysol	Kashiwa Soccer Stadium, Kashiwa, Japan
4	2012	Group stage			
4	2012	Group stage	3 – 1	(Japan) Kashiwa Reysol	Tianhe Sports Centre Stadium, Guangzhou, China
5	2012	Group stage			
5	2012	Group stage	1 – 3	(South Korea) Jeonbuk Hyundai Motors	Tianhe Sports Centre Stadium, Guangzhou, China
6	2012	Group stage			
6	2012	Group stage	2 – 1	(Thailand) Buriram United	Buriram Stadium, Buriram, Thailand
7	2012				
7	2012	Round of 16	1 – 0	(Japan) FC Tokyo	Tianhe Sports Centre Stadium, Guangzhou, China
8	2012	Round of 16			
8	2012	Quarter-finals	2 – 4	(Saudi Arabia) Al-Ittihad	Prince Abdullah Al Faisal Stadium, Jeddah, Saudi Arabia
9	2012	Quarter-finals			
9	2012	Quarter-finals	2 – 1	(Saudi Arabia) Al Ittihad	Tianhe Sports Centre Stadium, Guangzhou, China
10	2013	Group stage			
10	2013	Group stage	3 – 0	(Japan) Urawa Red Diamonds	Tianhe Sports Centre Stadium, Guangzhou, China
11	2013	Group stage			
11	2013	Group stage	1 – 1	(South Korea) Jeonbuk Hyundai Motors	Jeonju World Cup Stadium, Jeonju, South Korea
12	2013	Group stage			
12	2013	Group stage	4 – 0	(Thailand) Muangthong United	Tianhe Sports Centre Stadium, Guangzhou, China
13	2013	Group stage			
13	2013	Group stage	4 – 1	(Thailand) Muangthong United	SCG Stadium, Nonthaburi, Thailand
14	2013	Group stage			
14	2013	Group stage	2 – 3	(Japan) Urawa Red Diamonds	Saitama Stadium 2002, Saitama, Japan
15	2013	Group stage			
15	2013	Group stage	0 – 0	(South Korea) Jeonbuk Hyundai Motors	Tianhe Sports Centre Stadium, Guangzhou, China
16	2013				
16	2013	Round of 16	2 – 1	(Australia) Central Coast Mariners	Central Coast Stadium, Gosford, Australia
17	2013	Round of 16			
17	2013	Round of 16	3 – 0	(Australia) Central Coast Mariners	Tianhe Sports Centre Stadium, Guangzhou, China
18	2013				
18	2013	Quarter-finals	2 – 0	(Qatar) Lekhwiya	Tianhe Sports Centre Stadium, Guangzhou, China
19	2013	Quarter-finals			
19	2013	Quarter-finals	4 – 1	(Qatar) Lekhwiya	Abdullah bin Khalifa Stadium, Doha, Qatar
20	2013				
20	2013	Semi-finals	4 – 1	(Japan) Kashiwa Reysol	Kashiwa Soccer Stadium, Kashiwa, Japan
21	2013	Semi-finals			
21	2013	Semi-finals	4 – 0	(Japan) Kashiwa Reysol	Tianhe Sports Centre Stadium, Guangzhou, China
22	2013				
22	2013	Final	2 – 2	(South Korea) FC Seoul	Seoul World Cup Stadium, Seoul, South Korea
23	2013	Final			
23	2013	Final	1 – 1	(South Korea) FC Seoul	Tianhe Sports Centre Stadium, Guangzhou, China
24	2014	Group stage			
24	2014	Group stage	4 – 2	(Australia) Melbourne Victory	Tianhe Sports Centre Stadium, Guangzhou, China
25	2014	Group stage			
25	2014	Group stage	1 – 1	(Japan) Yokohama F. Marinos	International Stadium Yokohama, Yokohama, Japan
26	2014	Group stage			
26	2014	Group stage	3 – 1	(South Korea) Jeonbuk Hyundai Motors	Tianhe Sports Centre Stadium, Guangzhou, China
27	2014	Group stage			
27	2014	Group stage	0 – 1	(South Korea) Jeonbuk Hyundai Motors	Jeonju World Cup Stadium, Jeonju, South Korea
28	2014	Group stage			
28	2014	Group stage	0 – 2	(Australia) Melbourne Victory	Docklands Stadium, Melbourne, Australia
29	2014	Group stage			
29	2014	Group stage	2 – 1	(Japan) Yokohama F. Marinos	Tianhe Sports Centre Stadium, Guangzhou, China
30	2014				
30	2014	Round of 16	5 – 1	(Japan) Cerezo Osaka	Nagai Stadium, Osaka, Japan
31	2014	Round of 16			
31	2014	Round of 16	0 – 1	(Japan) Cerezo Osaka	Tianhe Sports Centre Stadium, Guangzhou, China
32	2014				
32	2014	Quarter-finals	0 – 1	(Australia) Western Sydney Wanderers	Parramatta Stadium, Sydney, Australia
33	2014	Quarter-finals			
33	2014	Quarter-finals	2 – 1	(Australia) Western Sydney Wanderers	Tianhe Sports Centre Stadium, Guangzhou, China
34	2015	Group stage			
34	2015	Group stage	1 – 0	(South Korea) FC Seoul	Tianhe Sports Centre Stadium, Guangzhou, China
35	2015	Group stage			
35	2015	Group stage	3 – 2	(Australia) Western Sydney Wanderers	Parramatta Stadium, Sydney, Australia
36	2015	Group stage			
36	2015	Group stage	4 – 3	(Japan) Kashima Antlers	Tianhe Sports Centre Stadium, Guangzhou, China
37	2015	Group stage			
37	2015	Group stage	1 – 2	(Japan) Kashima Antlers	Kashima Soccer Stadium, Kashima, Japan
38	2015	Group stage			
38	2015	Group stage	0 – 0	(South Korea) FC Seoul	Seoul World Cup Stadium, Seoul, South Korea
39	2015	Group stage			
39	2015	Group stage	0 – 2	(Australia) Western Sydney Wanderers	Tianhe Sports Centre Stadium, Guangzhou, China
40	2015				
40	2015	Round of 16	1 – 2	(South Korea) Seongnam FC	Tancheon Sports Complex, Seongnam, South Korea
41	2015	Round of 16			
41	2015	Round of 16	2 – 0	(South Korea) Seongnam FC	Tianhe Sports Centre Stadium, Guangzhou, China
42	2015				
42	2015	Quarter-finals	3 – 1	(Japan) Kashiwa Reysol	Kashiwa Soccer Stadium, Kashiwa, Japan
43	2015	Quarter-finals			
43	2015	Quarter-finals	1 – 1	(Japan) Kashiwa Reysol	Tianhe Sports Centre Stadium, Guangzhou, China
44	2015				
44	2015	Semi-finals	2 – 1	(Japan) Gamba Osaka	Tianhe Sports Centre Stadium, Guangzhou, China
45	2015	Semi-finals			
45	2015	Semi-finals	0 – 0	(Japan) Gamba Osaka	Osaka Expo '70 Stadium, Suita, Japan
46	2015				
46	2015	Final	0 – 0	(United Arab Emirates) Al-Ahli	Rashid Stadium, Dubai, United Arab Emirates
47	2015	Final			
47	2015	Final	1 – 0	(United Arab Emirates) Al-Ahli	Tianhe Sports Centre Stadium, Guangzhou, China
48	2016	Group stage			
48	2016	Group stage	0 – 0	(South Korea) Pohang Steelers	Tianhe Sports Centre Stadium, Guangzhou, China
49	2016	Group stage			
49	2016	Group stage	1 – 2	(Australia) Sydney FC	Sydney Football Stadium, Sydney, Australia
50	2016	Group stage			
50	2016	Group stage	2 – 2	(Japan) Urawa Red Diamonds	Tianhe Sports Centre Stadium, Guangzhou, China
51	2016	Group stage			
51	2016	Group stage	0 – 1	(Japan) Urawa Red Diamonds	Saitama Stadium 2002, Saitama, Japan
52	2016	Group stage			
52	2016	Group stage	2 – 0	(South Korea) Pohang Steelers	Pohang Steel Yard, Pohang, South Korea
53	2016	Group stage			
53	2016	Group stage	1 – 0	(Australia) Sydney FC	Tianhe Sports Centre Stadium, Guangzhou, China
54	2017	Group stage			
54	2017	Group stage	7 – 0	(Hong Kong) Eastern	Tianhe Sports Centre Stadium, Guangzhou, China
55	2017	Group stage			
55	2017	Group stage	2 – 2	(South Korea) Suwon Samsung Bluewings	Suwon World Cup Stadium, Suwon, South Korea
56	2017	Group stage			
56	2017	Group stage	1 – 1	(Japan) Kawasaki Frontale	Tianhe Sports Centre Stadium, Guangzhou, China
57	2017	Group stage			
57	2017	Group stage	0 – 0	(Japan) Kawasaki Frontale	Todoroki Athletics Stadium, Kawasaki, Japan
58	2017	Group stage			
58	2017	Group stage	6 – 0	(Hong Kong) Eastern	Mong Kok Stadium, Kowloon, Hong Kong
59	2017	Group stage			
59	2017	Group stage	2 – 2	(South Korea) Suwon Samsung Bluewings	Tianhe Sports Centre Stadium, Guangzhou, China
60	2017				
60	2017	Round of 16	1 – 0	(Japan) Kashima Antlers	Tianhe Sports Centre Stadium, Guangzhou, China
61	2017	Round of 16			
61	2017	Round of 16	1 – 2	(Japan) Kashima Antlers	Kashima Soccer Stadium, Kashima, Japan
62	2017				
62	2017	Quarter-finals	0 – 4	(China) Shanghai SIPG	Shanghai Stadium, Shanghai, China
63	2017	Quarter-finals			
63	2017	Quarter-finals	5 – 1 (4–5p)	(China) Shanghai SIPG	Tianhe Sports Centre Stadium, Guangzhou, China
64	2018	Group stage			
64	2018	Group stage	1 – 1	(Thailand) Buriram United	Tianhe Sports Centre Stadium, Guangzhou, China
65	2018	Group stage			
65	2018	Group stage	0 – 0	(Japan) Cerezo Osaka	Yanmar Stadium Nagai, Osaka, Japan
66	2018	Group stage			
66	2018	Group stage	5 – 3	(South Korea) Jeju United	Tianhe Sports Centre Stadium, Guangzhou, China
67	2018	Group stage			
67	2018	Group stage	2 – 0	(South Korea) Jeju United	Jeju World Cup Stadium, Seogwipo, South Korea
68	2018	Group stage			
68	2018	Group stage	1 – 1	(Thailand) Buriram United	Chang Arena, Buriram, Thailand
69	2018	Group stage			
69	2018	Group stage	3 – 1	(Japan) Cerezo Osaka	Tianhe Sports Centre Stadium, Guangzhou, China
70	2018				
70	2018	Round of 16	0 – 0	(China) Tianjin Quanjian	Tianjin Olympic Center Stadium, Tianjin, China
71	2018	Round of 16			
71	2018	Round of 16	2 – 2	(China) Tianjin Quanjian	Tianhe Sports Centre Stadium, Guangzhou, China
72	2019	Group stage			
72	2019	Group stage	2 – 0	(Japan) Sanfrecce Hiroshima	Tianhe Sports Centre Stadium, Guangzhou, China
73	2019	Group stage			
73	2019	Group stage	1 – 3	(South Korea) Daegu FC	DGB Daegu Bank Park, Daegu, South Korea
74	2019	Group stage			
74	2019	Group stage	4 – 0	(Australia) Melbourne Victory	Tianhe Sports Centre Stadium, Guangzhou, China
75	2019	Group stage			
75	2019	Group stage	–	(Australia) Melbourne Victory	Melbourne Rectangular Stadium, Melbourne, Australia
76	2019	Group stage			
76	2019	Group stage	–	(Japan) Sanfrecce Hiroshima	Edion Stadium Hiroshima, Hiroshima, Japan
77	2019	Group stage			
77	2019	Group stage	–	(South Korea) Daegu FC	Tianhe Sports Centre Stadium, Guangzhou, China

=== Guangzhou R&F ===
Guangzhou R&F statistics
Team	Pld	W	D	L	GF	GA	GD	Pts
(China) Guangzhou R&F	8	3	1	4	9	14	−5	10

Guangzhou R&F results
No	Season	Round	Result	Opponent	Venue
1	2015	Qualification stage			
1	2015	Qualification stage	3 – 0	(Singapore) Warriors	Yuexiushan Stadium, Guangzhou, China
2	2015	Qualification stage			
2	2015	Qualification stage	3 – 1	(Australia) Central Coast Mariners	Central Coast Stadium, Gosford, Australia
3	2015				
3	2015	Group stage	2 – 0	(Japan) Gamba Osaka	Osaka Expo '70 Stadium, Suita, Japan
4	2015	Group stage			
4	2015	Group stage	1 – 2	(Thailand) Buriram United	Yuexiushan Stadium, Guangzhou, China
5	2015	Group stage			
5	2015	Group stage	0 – 1	(South Korea) Seongnam FC	Yuexiushan Stadium, Guangzhou, China
6	2015	Group stage			
6	2015	Group stage	0 – 0	(South Korea) Seongnam FC	Tancheon Sports Complex, Seongnam, South Korea
7	2015	Group stage			
7	2015	Group stage	0 – 5	(Japan) Gamba Osaka	Yuexiushan Stadium, Guangzhou, China
8	2015	Group stage			
8	2015	Group stage	0 – 5	(Thailand) Buriram United	Buriram Stadium, Buriram, Thailand

=== Guizhou Renhe ===
Guizhou Renhe statistics
Team	Pld	W	D	L	GF	GA	GD	Pts
(China) Guizhou Renhe	12	2	4	6	10	17	−7	10

Guizhou Renhe results
No	Season	Round	Result	Opponent	Venue
1	2013	Group stage			
1	2013	Group stage	0 – 1	(Japan) Kashiwa Reysol	Guiyang Olympic Sports Center, Guiyang, China
2	2013	Group stage			
2	2013	Group stage	0 – 0	(South Korea) Suwon Samsung Bluewings	Suwon World Cup Stadium, Suwon, South Korea
3	2013	Group stage			
3	2013	Group stage	1 – 2	(Australia) Central Coast Mariners	Central Coast Stadium, Gosford, Australia
4	2013	Group stage			
4	2013	Group stage	2 – 1	(Australia) Central Coast Mariners	Guiyang Olympic Sports Center, Guiyang, China
5	2013	Group stage			
5	2013	Group stage	1 – 1	(Japan) Kashiwa Reysol	Kashiwa Soccer Stadium, Kashiwa, Japan
6	2013	Group stage			
6	2013	Group stage	2 – 2	(South Korea) Suwon Samsung Bluewings	Guiyang Olympic Sports Center, Guiyang, China
7	2014	Group stage			
7	2014	Group stage	0 – 1	(Japan) Kawasaki Frontale	Todoroki Athletics Stadium, Kawasaki, Japan
8	2014	Group stage			
8	2014	Group stage	0 – 1	(Australia) Western Sydney Wanderers	Guiyang Olympic Sports Center, Guiyang, China
9	2014	Group stage			
9	2014	Group stage	1 – 1	(South Korea) Ulsan Hyundai	Ulsan Munsu Football Stadium, Ulsan, South Korea
10	2014	Group stage			
10	2014	Group stage	3 – 1	(South Korea) Ulsan Hyundai	Guiyang Olympic Sports Center, Guiyang, China
11	2014	Group stage			
11	2014	Group stage	0 – 1	(Japan) Kawasaki Frontale	Guiyang Olympic Sports Center, Guiyang, China
12	2014	Group stage			
12	2014	Group stage	0 – 5	(Australia) Western Sydney Wanderers	Parramatta Stadium, Sydney, Australia

=== Hangzhou Greentown ===
Hangzhou Greentown statistics
Team	Pld	W	D	L	GF	GA	GD	Pts
(China) Hangzhou Greentown	6	1	2	3	3	6	−3	5

Hangzhou Greentown results
No	Season	Round	Result	Opponent	Venue
1	2011	Group stage			
1	2011	Group stage	2 – 0	(Japan) Nagoya Grampus	Yellow Dragon Sports Center, Hangzhou, China
2	2011	Group stage			
2	2011	Group stage	0 – 3	(South Korea) FC Seoul	Seoul World Cup Stadium, Seoul, South Korea
3	2011	Group stage			
3	2011	Group stage	0 – 0	(United Arab Emirates) Al-Ain	Yellow Dragon Sports Center, Hangzhou, China
4	2011	Group stage			
4	2011	Group stage	0 – 1	(United Arab Emirates) Al-Ain	Tahnoun bin Mohammed Stadium, Al Ain, UAE
5	2011	Group stage			
5	2011	Group stage	0 – 1	(Japan) Nagoya Grampus	Mizuho Athletic Stadium, Nagoya, Japan
6	2011	Group stage			
6	2011	Group stage	1 – 1	(South Korea) FC Seoul	Yellow Dragon Sports Center, Hangzhou, China

=== Henan Construction ===
Henan Construction statistics
Team	Pld	W	D	L	GF	GA	GD	Pts
(China) Henan Construction	6	0	3	3	3	8	−5	3

Henan Construction results
No	Season	Round	Result	Opponent	Venue
1	2010	Group stage			
1	2010	Group stage	0 – 0	Singapore Armed Forces	Zhengzhou Hanghai Stadium, Zhengzhou, China
2	2010	Group stage			
2	2010	Group stage	1 – 1	(Japan) Gamba Osaka	Osaka Expo '70 Stadium, Suita, Japan
3	2010	Group stage			
3	2010	Group stage	0 – 2	(South Korea) Suwon Samsung Bluewings	Zhengzhou Hanghai Stadium, Zhengzhou, China
4	2010	Group stage			
4	2010	Group stage	0 – 2	(South Korea) Suwon Samsung Bluewings	Suwon World Cup Stadium, Suwon, South Korea
5	2010	Group stage			
5	2010	Group stage	1 – 2	Singapore Armed Forces	Jalan Besar Stadium, Singapore
6	2010	Group stage			
6	2010	Group stage	1 – 1	(Japan) Gamba Osaka	Zhengzhou Hanghai Stadium, Zhengzhou, China

=== Jiangsu Suning ===
Jiangsu Suning statistics
Team	Pld	W	D	L	GF	GA	GD	Pts
(China) Jiangsu Suning	20	9	4	7	27	25	+2	31

Jiangsu Suning results
No	Season	Round	Result	Opponent	Venue
1	2013	Group stage			
1	2013	Group stage	1 – 5	(South Korea) FC Seoul	Seoul World Cup Stadium, Seoul, South Korea
2	2013	Group stage			
2	2013	Group stage	0 – 0	(Japan) Vegalta Sendai	Nanjing Olympic Sports Centre, Nanjing, China
3	2013	Group stage			
3	2013	Group stage	2 – 0	(Thailand) Buriram United	Nanjing Olympic Sports Centre, Nanjing, China
4	2013	Group stage			
4	2013	Group stage	0 – 2	(Thailand) Buriram United	Buriram Stadium, Buriram, Thailand
5	2013	Group stage			
5	2013	Group stage	0 – 2	(South Korea) FC Seoul	Nanjing Olympic Sports Centre, Nanjing, China
6	2013	Group stage			
6	2013	Group stage	2 – 1	(Japan) Vegalta Sendai	Yurtec Stadium Sendai, Sendai, Japan
7	2016	Group stage			
7	2016	Group stage	1 – 1	(Vietnam) Becamex Bình Dương	Gò Đậu Stadium, Thủ Dầu Một, Vietnam
8	2016	Group stage			
8	2016	Group stage	3 – 2	(South Korea) Jeonbuk Hyundai Motors	Nanjing Olympic Sports Centre, Nanjing, China
9	2016	Group stage			
9	2016	Group stage	0 – 0	(Japan) FC Tokyo	Ajinomoto Stadium, Tokyo, Japan
10	2016	Group stage			
10	2016	Group stage	1 – 2	(Japan) FC Tokyo	Nanjing Olympic Sports Centre, Nanjing, China
11	2016	Group stage			
11	2016	Group stage	3 – 0	(Vietnam) Becamex Bình Dương	Nanjing Olympic Sports Centre, Nanjing, China
12	2016	Group stage			
12	2016	Group stage	2 – 2	(South Korea) Jeonbuk Hyundai Motors	Jeonju World Cup Stadium, Jeonju, South Korea
13	2017	Group stage			
13	2017	Group stage	1 – 0	(South Korea) Jeju United	Jeju World Cup Stadium, Seogwipo, South Korea
14	2017	Group stage			
14	2017	Group stage	2 – 1	(Australia) Adelaide United	Nanjing Olympic Sports Centre, Nanjing, China
15	2017	Group stage			
15	2017	Group stage	1 – 0	(Japan) Gamba Osaka	Suita City Football Stadium, Suita, Japan
16	2017	Group stage			
16	2017	Group stage	3 – 0	(Japan) Gamba Osaka	Nanjing Olympic Sports Centre, Nanjing, China
17	2017	Group stage			
17	2017	Group stage	1 – 2	(South Korea) Jeju United	Nanjing Olympic Sports Centre, Nanjing, China
18	2017	Group stage			
18	2017	Group stage	1 – 0	(Australia) Adelaide United	Hindmarsh Stadium, Adelaide, Australia
19	2017				
19	2017	Round of 16	1 – 2	(China) Shanghai SIPG	Shanghai Stadium, Shanghai, China
20	2017	Round of 16			
20	2017	Round of 16	2 – 3	(China) Shanghai SIPG	Nanjing Olympic Sports Centre, Nanjing, China

=== Shandong Luneng Taishan ===
Shandong Luneng Taishan statistics
Team	Pld	W	D	L	GF	GA	GD	Pts
(China) Shandong Luneng Taishan	60	26	14	20	106	90	+16	92

Shandong Luneng Taishan results
No	Season	Round	Result	Opponent	Venue
1	2005	Group stage			
1	2005	Group stage	1 – 0	(Japan) Yokohama F. Marinos	International Stadium Yokohama, Yokohama, Japan
2	2005	Group stage			
2	2005	Group stage	1 – 0	(Thailand) BEC Tero Sasana	Shandong Provincial Stadium, Jinan, China
3	2005	Group stage			
3	2005	Group stage	1 – 0	(Indonesia) PSM Makassar	Andi Mattalata Stadium, Makassar, Indonesia
4	2005	Group stage			
4	2005	Group stage	6 – 1	(Indonesia) PSM Makassar	Shandong Provincial Stadium, Jinan, China
5	2005	Group stage			
5	2005	Group stage	2 – 1	(Japan) Yokohama F. Marinos	Shandong Provincial Stadium, Jinan, China
6	2005	Group stage			
6	2005	Group stage	4 – 0	(Thailand) BEC Tero Sasana	Suphachalasai Stadium, Bangkok, Thailand
7	2005				
7	2005	Quarter-finals	1 – 1	(Saudi Arabia) Al Ittihad	Shandong Provincial Stadium, Jinan, China
8	2005	Quarter-finals			
8	2005	Quarter-finals	2 – 7	(Saudi Arabia) Al Ittihad	Prince Abdullah al-Faisal Stadium, Jeddah, Saudi Arabia
9	2007	Group stage			
9	2007	Group stage	1 – 0	(Australia) Adelaide United	Hindmarsh Stadium, Adelaide, Australia
10	2007	Group stage			
10	2007	Group stage	2 – 1	(South Korea) Seongnam Ilhwa Chunma	Shandong Provincial Stadium, Jinan, China
11	2007	Group stage			
11	2007	Group stage	4 – 0	(Vietnam) Đồng Tâm Long An	Shandong Provincial Stadium, Jinan, China
12	2007	Group stage			
12	2007	Group stage	3 – 2	(Vietnam) Đồng Tâm Long An	Long An Stadium, Tân An, Vietnam
13	2007	Group stage			
13	2007	Group stage	2 – 2	(Australia) Adelaide United	Shandong Provincial Stadium, Jinan, China
14	2007	Group stage			
14	2007	Group stage	0 – 3	(South Korea) Seongnam Ilhwa Chunma	Tancheon Sports Complex, Seongnam, South Korea
15	2009	Group stage			
15	2009	Group stage	0 – 3	(Japan) Gamba Osaka	Osaka Expo '70 Stadium, Suita, Japan
16	2009	Group stage			
16	2009	Group stage	5 – 0	(Indonesia) Sriwijaya	Shandong Provincial Stadium, Jinan, China
17	2009	Group stage			
17	2009	Group stage	2 – 0	(South Korea) FC Seoul	Shandong Provincial Stadium, Jinan, China
18	2009	Group stage			
18	2009	Group stage	1 – 1	(South Korea) FC Seoul	Seoul World Cup Stadium, Seoul, South Korea
19	2009	Group stage			
19	2009	Group stage	0 – 1	(Japan) Gamba Osaka	Shandong Provincial Stadium, Jinan, China
20	2009	Group stage			
20	2009	Group stage	2 – 4	(Indonesia) Sriwijaya	Jakabaring Stadium, Palembang, Indonesia
21	2010	Group stage			
21	2010	Group stage	1 – 0	(Japan) Sanfrecce Hiroshima	Hiroshima Big Arch, Hiroshima, Japan
22	2010	Group stage			
22	2010	Group stage	0 – 2	(Australia) Adelaide United	Shandong Provincial Stadium, Jinan, China
23	2010	Group stage			
23	2010	Group stage	0 – 1	(South Korea) Pohang Steelers	Pohang Steel Yard, Pohang, South Korea
24	2010	Group stage			
24	2010	Group stage	1 – 2	(South Korea) Pohang Steelers	Shandong Provincial Stadium, Jinan, China
25	2010	Group stage			
25	2010	Group stage	2 – 3	(Japan) Sanfrecce Hiroshima	Shandong Provincial Stadium, Jinan, China
26	2010	Group stage			
26	2010	Group stage	1 – 0	(Australia) Adelaide United	Hindmarsh Stadium, Adelaide, Australia
27	2011	Group stage			
27	2011	Group stage	0 – 1	(South Korea) Jeonbuk Hyundai Motors	Jeonju World Cup Stadium, Jeonju, South Korea
28	2011	Group stage			
28	2011	Group stage	2 – 0	(Japan) Cerezo Osaka	Shandong Provincial Stadium, Jinan, China
29	2011	Group stage			
29	2011	Group stage	1 – 1	(Indonesia) Arema	Kanjuruhan Stadium, Malang, Indonesia
30	2011	Group stage			
30	2011	Group stage	5 – 0	(Indonesia) Arema	Shandong Provincial Stadium, Jinan, China
31	2011	Group stage			
31	2011	Group stage	1 – 2	(South Korea) Jeonbuk Hyundai Motors	Shandong Provincial Stadium, Jinan, China
32	2011	Group stage			
32	2011	Group stage	0 – 4	(Japan) Cerezo Osaka	Yanmar Stadium Nagai, Osaka, Japan
33	2014	Group stage			
33	2014	Group stage	1 – 1	(Thailand) Buriram United	Jinan Olympic Sports Center Stadium, Jinan, China
34	2014	Group stage			
34	2014	Group stage	3 – 1	(Japan) Cerezo Osaka	Yanmar Stadium Nagai, Osaka, Japan
35	2014	Group stage			
35	2014	Group stage	2 – 2	(South Korea) Pohang Steelers	Pohang Steel Yard, Pohang, South Korea
36	2014	Group stage			
36	2014	Group stage	2 – 4	(South Korea) Pohang Steelers	Jinan Olympic Sports Center Stadium, Jinan, China
37	2014	Group stage			
37	2014	Group stage	0 – 1	(Thailand) Buriram United	Buriram Stadium, Buriram, Thailand
38	2014	Group stage			
38	2014	Group stage	1 – 2	(Japan) Cerezo Osaka	Jinan Olympic Sports Center Stadium, Jinan, China
39	2015	Group stage			
39	2015	Group stage	3 – 2	(Vietnam) Becamex Bình Dương	Gò Đậu Stadium, Thủ Dầu Một, Vietnam
40	2015	Group stage			
40	2015	Group stage	1 – 4	(South Korea) Jeonbuk Hyundai Motors	Jinan Olympic Sports Center Stadium, Jinan, China
41	2015	Group stage			
41	2015	Group stage	1 – 2	(Japan) Kashiwa Reysol	Kashiwa Soccer Stadium, Kashiwa, Japan
42	2015	Group stage			
42	2015	Group stage	4 – 4	(Japan) Kashiwa Reysol	Jinan Olympic Sports Center Stadium, Jinan, China
43	2015	Group stage			
43	2015	Group stage	3 – 1	(Vietnam) Becamex Bình Dương	Jinan Olympic Sports Center Stadium, Jinan, China
44	2015	Group stage			
44	2015	Group stage	1 – 4	(South Korea) Jeonbuk Hyundai Motors	Jeonju World Cup Stadium, Jeonju, South Korea
45	2016	Qualification stage			
45	2016	Qualification stage	6 – 0	(India) Mohun Bagan	Jinan Olympic Sports Center Stadium, Jinan, China
46	2016	Qualification stage			
46	2016	Qualification stage	2 – 1	(Australia) Adelaide United	Hindmarsh Stadium, Adelaide, Australia
47	2016				
47	2016	Group stage	2 – 1	(Japan) Sanfrecce Hiroshima	Hiroshima Big Arch, Hiroshima, Japan
48	2016	Group stage			
48	2016	Group stage	3 – 0	(Thailand) Buriram United	Jinan Olympic Sports Center Stadium, Jinan, China
49	2016	Group stage			
49	2016	Group stage	1 – 4	(South Korea) FC Seoul	Jinan Olympic Sports Center Stadium, Jinan, China
50	2016	Group stage			
50	2016	Group stage	0 – 0	(South Korea) FC Seoul	Seoul World Cup Stadium, Seoul, South Korea
51	2016	Group stage			
51	2016	Group stage	1 – 0	(Japan) Sanfrecce Hiroshima	Jinan Olympic Sports Center Stadium, Jinan, China
52	2016	Group stage			
52	2016	Group stage	0 – 0	(Thailand) Buriram United	Buriram Stadium, Buriram, Thailand
53	2016	Group stage			
53	2016	Round of 16	1 – 1	(Australia) Sydney FC	Jinan Olympic Sports Center Stadium, Jinan, China
54	2016	Round of 16			
54	2016	Round of 16	2 – 2	(Australia) Sydney FC	Sydney Football Stadium, Sydney, Australia
55	2016				
55	2016	Quarter-finals	1 – 3	(South Korea) FC Seoul	Seoul World Cup Stadium, Seoul, South Korea
56	2016	Quarter-finals			
56	2016	Quarter-finals	1 – 1	(South Korea) FC Seoul	Jinan Olympic Sports Center Stadium, Jinan, China
57	2019	Qualification stage			
57	2019	Qualification stage	4 – 1	(Vietnam) Hà Nội F.C.	Jinan Olympic Sports Center Stadium, Jinan, China
58	2019				
58	2019	Group stage	2 – 2	(South Korea) Gyeongnam FC	Changwon Football Center, Changwon, South Korea
59	2019	Group stage			
59	2019	Group stage	2 – 2	(Japan) Kashima Antlers	Jinan Olympic Sports Center Stadium, Jinan, China
60	2019	Group stage			
60	2019	Group stage	2 – 1	(Malaysia) Johor Darul Ta'zim F.C.	Jinan Olympic Sports Center Stadium, Jinan, China
61	2019	Group stage			
61	2019	Group stage	–	(Malaysia) Johor Darul Ta'zim F.C.	Tan Sri Dato' Haji Hassan Yunos Stadium, Johor Bahru, Malaysia
62	2019	Group stage			
62	2019	Group stage	–	(South Korea) Gyeongnam FC	Jinan Olympic Sports Center Stadium, Jinan, China
63	2019	Group stage			
63	2019	Group stage	–	(Japan) Kashima Antlers	Kashima Soccer Stadium, Kashima, Japan

=== Shanghai Shenhua ===
Shanghai Shenhua statistics
Team	Pld	W	D	L	GF	GA	GD	Pts
(China) Shanghai Shenhua	42	13	11	18	59	63	−4	50

Shanghai Shenhua results
No	Season	Round	Result	Opponent	Venue
1	2002–03	Qualification stage			
1	2002–03	Qualification stage	1 – 3	(Indonesia) Petrokimia Putra	Gresik, Indonesia
2	2002–03	Qualification stage			
2	2002–03	Qualification stage	5 – 1	(Indonesia) Petrokimia Putra	Hongkou Football Stadium, Shanghai, China
3	2002–03	Qualification stage			
3	2002–03	Qualification stage	3 – 0	(Singapore) Geylang United	Hongkou Football Stadium, Shanghai, China
4	2002–03	Qualification stage			
4	2002–03	Qualification stage	2 – 1	(Singapore) Geylang United	Singapore, Singapore
5	2002–03				
5	2002–03	Group stage	1 – 2	(South Korea) Daejeon Citizen	Suphachalasai Stadium, Bangkok, Thailand
6	2002–03	Group stage			
6	2002–03	Group stage	4 – 3	(Japan) Kashima Antlers	Suphachalasai Stadium, Bangkok, Thailand
7	2002–03	Group stage			
7	2002–03	Group stage	1 – 2	(Thailand) BEC Tero Sasana	Suphachalasai Stadium, Bangkok, Thailand
8	2004	Group stage			
8	2004	Group stage	1 – 4	(Thailand) BEC Tero Sasana	Thai-Japanese Stadium, Bangkok, Thailand
9	2004	Group stage			
9	2004	Group stage	0 – 1	(South Korea) Jeonbuk Hyundai Motors	Hongkou Football Stadium, Shanghai, China
10	2004	Group stage			
10	2004	Group stage	1 – 2	(Japan) Jubilo Iwata	Yamaha Stadium, Iwata, Japan
11	2004	Group stage			
11	2004	Group stage	3 – 2	(Japan) Jubilo Iwata	Hongkou Football Stadium, Shanghai, China
12	2004	Group stage			
12	2004	Group stage	1 – 0	(Thailand) BEC Tero Sasana	Hongkou Football Stadium, Shanghai, China
13	2004	Group stage			
13	2004	Group stage	1 – 0	(South Korea) Jeonbuk Hyundai Motors	Jeonju World Cup Stadium, Jeonju, South Korea
14	2006	Group stage			
14	2006	Group stage	3 – 1	(Vietnam) Đồng Tâm Long An	Yuanshen Sports Centre Stadium, Shanghai, China
15	2006	Group stage			
15	2006	Group stage	4 – 2	(Vietnam) Đồng Tâm Long An	Long An Stadium, Tân An, Vietnam
16	2006				
16	2006	Quarter-finals	1 – 0	(South Korea) Jeonbuk Hyundai Motors	Yuanshen Sports Centre Stadium, Shanghai, China
17	2006	Quarter-finals			
17	2006	Quarter-finals	2 – 4	(South Korea) Jeonbuk Hyundai Motors	Jeonju World Cup Stadium, Jeonju, South Korea
18	2007	Group stage			
18	2007	Group stage	1 – 2	(Australia) Sydney FC	Yuanshen Sports Centre Stadium, Shanghai, China
19	2007	Group stage			
19	2007	Group stage	0 – 1	(Indonesia) Persik Kediri	Manahan Stadium, Surakarta, Indonesia
20	2007	Group stage			
20	2007	Group stage	0 – 1	(Japan) Urawa Red Diamonds	Saitama Stadium 2002, Saitama, Japan
21	2007	Group stage			
21	2007	Group stage	0 – 0	(Japan) Urawa Red Diamonds	Yuanshen Sports Centre Stadium, Shanghai, China
22	2007	Group stage			
22	2007	Group stage	0 – 0	(Australia) Sydney FC	Sydney Football Stadium, Sydney, Australia
23	2007	Group stage			
23	2007	Group stage	6 – 0	(Indonesia) Persik Kediri	Yuanshen Sports Centre Stadium, Shanghai, China
24	2009	Group stage			
24	2009	Group stage	4 – 1	Singapore Armed Forces	Hongkou Football Stadium, Shanghai, China
25	2009	Group stage			
25	2009	Group stage	0 – 2	(Japan) Kashima Antlers	Kashima Soccer Stadium, Kashima, Japan
26	2009	Group stage			
26	2009	Group stage	2 – 1	(South Korea) Suwon Samsung Bluewings	Hongkou Football Stadium, Shanghai, China
27	2009	Group stage			
27	2009	Group stage	1 – 2	(South Korea) Suwon Samsung Bluewings	Suwon World Cup Stadium, Suwon, South Korea
28	2009	Group stage			
28	2009	Group stage	1 – 1	Singapore Armed Forces	Jalan Besar Stadium, Singapore
29	2009	Group stage			
29	2009	Group stage	1 – 1	(Japan) Kashima Antlers	Hongkou Football Stadium, Shanghai, China
30	2011	Group stage			
30	2011	Group stage	0 – 0	(Japan) Kashima Antlers	Hongkou Football Stadium, Shanghai, China
31	2011	Group stage			
31	2011	Group stage	0 – 4	(South Korea) Suwon Samsung Bluewings	Suwon World Cup Stadium, Suwon, South Korea
32	2011	Group stage			
32	2011	Group stage	1 – 1	(Australia) Sydney FC	Sydney Football Stadium, Sydney, Australia
33	2011	Group stage			
33	2011	Group stage	2 – 3	(Australia) Sydney FC	Hongkou Football Stadium, Shanghai, China
34	2011	Group stage			
34	2011	Group stage	0 – 2	(Japan) Kashima Antlers	National Stadium, Tokyo, Japan
35	2011	Group stage			
35	2011	Group stage	0 – 3	(South Korea) Suwon Samsung Bluewings	Hongkou Football Stadium, Shanghai, China
36	2017	Qualification stage	0 – 2	(Australia) Brisbane Roar	Hongkou Football Stadium, Shanghai, China
37	2018	Group stage			
37	2018	Group stage	1 – 1	(Japan) Kashima Antlers	Kashima Soccer Stadium, Kashima, Japan
38	2018	Group stage			
38	2018	Group stage	2 – 2	(Australia) Sydney FC	Hongkou Football Stadium, Shanghai, China
39	2018	Group stage			
39	2018	Group stage	1 – 1	(South Korea) Suwon Samsung Bluewings	Suwon World Cup Stadium, Suwon, South Korea
40	2018	Group stage			
40	2018	Group stage	0 – 2	(South Korea) Suwon Samsung Bluewings	Hongkou Football Stadium, Shanghai, China
41	2018	Group stage			
41	2018	Group stage	2 – 2	(Japan) Kashima Antlers	Hongkou Football Stadium, Shanghai, China
42	2018	Group stage			
42	2018	Group stage	0 – 0	(Australia) Sydney FC	Sydney Football Stadium, Sydney, Australia

=== Shanghai SIPG ===
Shanghai SIPG statistics
Team	Pld	W	D	L	GF	GA	GD	Pts
(China) Shanghai SIPG	36	20	5	11	62	48	+14	65

Shanghai SIPG results
No	Season	Round	Result	Opponent	Venue
1	2016	Qualification stage			
1	2016	Qualification stage	3 – 0	(Thailand) Muangthong United	Shanghai Stadium, Shanghai, China
2	2016				
2	2016	Group stage	1 – 2	(Australia) Melbourne Victory	Melbourne Rectangular Stadium, Melbourne, Australia
3	2016	Group stage			
3	2016	Group stage	2 – 1	(South Korea) Suwon Samsung Bluewings	Shanghai Stadium, Shanghai, China
4	2016	Group stage			
4	2016	Group stage	2 – 1	(Japan) Gamba Osaka	Shanghai Stadium, Shanghai, China
5	2016	Group stage			
5	2016	Group stage	2 – 0	(Japan) Gamba Osaka	Suita City Football Stadium, Suita, Japan
6	2016	Group stage			
6	2016	Group stage	3 – 1	(Australia) Melbourne Victory	Shanghai Stadium, Shanghai, China
7	2016	Group stage			
7	2016	Group stage	0 – 3	(South Korea) Suwon Samsung Bluewings	Suwon World Cup Stadium, Suwon, South Korea
8	2016	Group stage			
8	2016	Round of 16	1 – 2	(Japan) FC Tokyo	Ajinomoto Stadium, Tokyo, Japan
9	2016	Round of 16			
9	2016	Round of 16	1 – 0	(Japan) FC Tokyo	Shanghai Stadium, Shanghai, China
10	2016				
10	2016	Quarter-finals	0 – 0	(South Korea) Jeonbuk Hyundai Motors	Shanghai Stadium, Shanghai, China
11	2016	Quarter-finals			
11	2016	Quarter-finals	0 – 5	(South Korea) Jeonbuk Hyundai Motors	Jeonju World Cup Stadium, Jeonju, South Korea
12	2017	Qualification stage			
12	2017	Qualification stage	3 – 0	(Thailand) Sukhothai	Shanghai Stadium, Shanghai, China
13	2017				
13	2017	Group stage	1 – 0	(South Korea) FC Seoul	Seoul World Cup Stadium, Seoul, South Korea
14	2017	Group stage			
14	2017	Group stage	5 – 1	(Australia) Western Sydney Wanderers	Shanghai Stadium, Shanghai, China
15	2017	Group stage			
15	2017	Group stage	3 – 2	(Japan) Urawa Red Diamonds	Shanghai Stadium, Shanghai, China
16	2017	Group stage			
16	2017	Group stage	0 – 1	(Japan) Urawa Red Diamonds	Saitama Stadium 2002, Saitama, Japan
17	2017	Group stage			
17	2017	Group stage	4 – 2	(South Korea) FC Seoul	Shanghai Stadium, Shanghai, China
18	2017	Group stage			
18	2017	Group stage	2 – 3	(Australia) Western Sydney Wanderers	Campbelltown Stadium, Sydney, Australia
19	2017	Group stage			
19	2017	Round of 16	2 – 1	(China) Jiangsu Suning	Shanghai Stadium, Shanghai, China
20	2017	Round of 16			
20	2017	Round of 16	3 – 2	(China) Jiangsu Suning	Nanjing Olympic Sports Centre, Nanjing, China
21	2017				
21	2017	Quarter-finals	4 – 0	(China) Guangzhou Evergrande	Shanghai Stadium, Shanghai, China
22	2017	Quarter-finals			
22	2017	Quarter-finals	1 – 5 (5 – 4 p)	(China) Guangzhou Evergrande	Tianhe Sports Centre Stadium, Guangzhou, China
23	2017				
23	2017	Semi-finals	1 – 1	(Japan) Urawa Red Diamonds	Shanghai Stadium, Shanghai, China
24	2017	Semi-finals			
24	2017	Semi-finals	0 – 1	(Japan) Urawa Red Diamonds	Saitama Stadium 2002, Saitama, Japan
25	2018	Qualification stage			
25	2018	Qualification stage	1 – 0	(Thailand) Chiangrai United	Shanghai Stadium, Shanghai, China
26	2018				
26	2018	Group stage	1 – 0	(Japan) Kawasaki Frontale	Todoroki Athletics Stadium, Kawasaki, Japan
27	2018	Group stage			
27	2018	Group stage	4 – 1	(Australia) Melbourne Victory	Shanghai Stadium, Shanghai, China
28	2018	Group stage			
28	2018	Group stage	2 – 2	(South Korea) Ulsan Hyundai	Shanghai Stadium, Shanghai, China
29	2018	Group stage			
29	2018	Group stage	1 – 0	(South Korea) Ulsan Hyundai	Ulsan Munsu Football Stadium, Ulsan, South Korea
30	2018	Group stage			
30	2018	Group stage	1 – 1	(Japan) Kawasaki Frontale	Shanghai Stadium, Shanghai, China
31	2018	Group stage			
31	2018	Group stage	1 – 2	(Australia) Melbourne Victory	Melbourne Rectangular Stadium, Melbourne, Australia
32	2018	Group stage			
32	2018	Round of 16	1 – 3	(Japan) Kashima Antlers	Kashima Soccer Stadium, Kashima, Japan
33	2018	Round of 16			
33	2018	Round of 16	2 – 1	(Japan) Kashima Antlers	Shanghai Stadium, Shanghai, China
34	2019	Group stage			
34	2019	Group stage	1 – 0	(Japan) Kawasaki Frontale	Shanghai Stadium, Shanghai, China
35	2019	Group stage			
35	2019	Group stage	0 – 1	(South Korea) Ulsan Hyundai	Ulsan Munsu Football Stadium, Ulsan, South Korea
36	2019	Group stage			
36	2019	Group stage	3 – 3	(Australia) Sydney FC	Jubilee Oval, Sydney, Australia
37	2019	Group stage			
37	2019	Group stage	2 – 2	(Australia) Sydney FC	Shanghai Stadium, Shanghai, China
38	2019	Group stage			
38	2019	Group stage	2 – 2	(Japan) Kawasaki Frontale	Todoroki Athletics Stadium, Kawasaki, Japan
39	2019	Group stage			
39	2019	Group stage	5 – 0	(South Korea) Ulsan Hyundai	Shanghai Stadium, Shanghai, China
40	2019				
40	2019	Round of 16	1 – 1	(South Korea) Jeonbuk Hyundai Motors	Shanghai Stadium, Shanghai, China
41	2019	Round of 16			
41	2019	Round of 16	1 – 1 (5 – 3 p)	(South Korea) Jeonbuk Hyundai Motors	Jeonju World Cup Stadium, Jeonju, South Korea
42	2019				
42	2019	Quarter-finals	2 – 2	(Japan) Urawa Red Diamonds	Shanghai Stadium, Shanghai, China
43	2019	Quarter-finals			
43	2019	Quarter-finals	1 – 1	(Japan) Urawa Red Diamonds	Saitama Stadium 2002, Saitama, Japan
44	2020	Qualification stage			
44	2020	Qualification stage	3 – 0	(Thailand) Buriram United	Yuanshen Sports Centre Stadium, Shanghai, China
45	2020				
45	2020	Group stage	–	(Japan) Yokohama F. Marinos	Nissan Stadium, Yokohama, Japan
46	2020	Group stage			
46	2020	Group stage	–	(Australia) Sydney FC	Yuanshen Sports Centre Stadium, Shanghai, China
47	2020	Group stage			
47	2020	Group stage	–	(Australia) Sydney FC	Jubilee Oval, Sydney, Australia
48	2020	Group stage			
48	2020	Group stage	–	(South Korea) Jeonbuk Hyundai Motors	Yuanshen Sports Centre Stadium, Shanghai, China
49	2020	Group stage			
49	2020	Group stage	–	(South Korea) Jeonbuk Hyundai Motors	Jeonju World Cup Stadium, Jeonju, South Korea
50	2020	Group stage			
50	2020	Group stage	–	(Japan) Yokohama F. Marinos	Yuanshen Sports Centre Stadium, Shanghai, China

=== Shenzhen Jianlibao ===
Shenzhen Jianlibao statistics
Team	Pld	W	D	L	GF	GA	GD	Pts
(China) Shenzhen Jianlibao	10	5	2	3	13	12	+1	17

Shenzhen Jianlibao results
No	Season	Round	Result	Opponent	Venue
1	2005	Group stage			
1	2005	Group stage	1 – 0	(Japan) Jubilo Iwata	Shenzhen Stadium, Shenzhen, China
2	2005	Group stage			
2	2005	Group stage	0 – 0	(South Korea) Suwon Samsung Bluewings	Suwon World Cup Stadium, Suwon, South Korea
3	2005	Group stage			
3	2005	Group stage	5 – 0	(Vietnam) Hoàng Anh Gia Lai	Shenzhen Stadium, Shenzhen, China
4	2005	Group stage			
4	2005	Group stage	2 – 0	(Vietnam) Hoàng Anh Gia Lai	Pleiku Stadium, Pleiku, Vietnam
5	2005	Group stage			
5	2005	Group stage	0 – 3	(Japan) Jubilo Iwata	Yamaha Stadium, Iwata, Japan
6	2005	Group stage			
6	2005	Group stage	1 – 0	(South Korea) Suwon Samsung Bluewings	Shenzhen Stadium, Shenzhen, China
7	2005				
7	2005	Quarter-finals	1 – 2	(Saudi Arabia) Al Ahli	Prince Abdullah Al Faisal Stadium, Jeddah, Saudi Arabia
8	2005	Quarter-finals			
8	2005	Quarter-finals	3 – 1	(Saudi Arabia) Al Ahli	Shenzhen Stadium, Shenzhen, China
9	2005				
9	2005	Semi-finals	0 – 6	(United Arab Emirates) Al Ain	Tahnoun bin Mohammed Stadium, Al Ain, UAE
10	2005	Semi-finals			
10	2005	Semi-finals	0 – 0	(United Arab Emirates) Al Ain	Shenzhen Stadium, Shenzhen, China

=== Tianjin Quanjian ===
Tianjin Quanjian statistics
Team	Pld	W	D	L	GF	GA	GD	Pts
(China) Tianjin Quanjian	11	5	3	3	19	18	+1	18

Tianjin Quanjian results
No	Season	Round	Result	Opponent	Venue
1	2018	Qualification stage			
1	2018	Qualification stage	2 – 0	(Philippines) Ceres–Negros	Tianjin Olympic Center Stadium, Tianjin, China
2	2018				
2	2018	Group stage	3 – 0	(Hong Kong) Kitchee	Tianjin Olympic Center Stadium, Tianjin, China
3	2018	Group stage			
3	2018	Group stage	1 – 1	(Japan) Kashiwa Reysol	Kashiwa Soccer Stadium, Kashiwa, Japan
4	2018	Group stage			
4	2018	Group stage	3 – 6	(South Korea) Jeonbuk Hyundai Motors	Jeonju World Cup Stadium, Jeonju, South Korea
5	2018	Group stage			
5	2018	Group stage	4 – 2	(South Korea) Jeonbuk Hyundai Motors	Tianjin Olympic Center Stadium, Tianjin, China
6	2018	Group stage			
6	2018	Group stage	1 – 0	(Hong Kong) Kitchee	Mong Kok Stadium, Kowloon, Hong Kong
7	2018	Group stage			
7	2018	Group stage	3 – 2	(Japan) Kashiwa Reysol	Tianjin Olympic Center Stadium, Tianjin, China
8	2018	Group stage			
8	2018	Round of 16	0 – 0	(China) Guangzhou Evergrande	Tianjin Olympic Center Stadium, Tianjin, China
9	2018	Round of 16			
9	2018	Round of 16	2 – 2	(China) Guangzhou Evergrande	Tianhe Sports Centre Stadium, Guangzhou, China
10	2018	Round of 16			
10	2018	Quarter-finals	0 – 2	(Japan) Kashima Antlers	Kashima Soccer Stadium, Kashima, Japan
11	2018	Quarter-finals			
11	2018	Quarter-finals	0 – 3	(Japan) Kashima Antlers	Estádio Campo Desportivo, Macau

=== Tianjin Teda ===
Tianjin Teda statistics
Team	Pld	W	D	L	GF	GA	GD	Pts
(China) Tianjin Teda	19	5	6	8	16	26	−10	21

Tianjin Teda results
No	Season	Round	Result	Opponent	Venue
1	2009	Group stage			
1	2009	Group stage	0 – 1	(Japan) Kawasaki Frontale	Todoroki Athletics Stadium, Kawasaki, Japan
2	2009	Group stage			
2	2009	Group stage	2 – 2	(Australia) Central Coast Mariners	TEDA Football Stadium, Tianjin, China
3	2009	Group stage			
3	2009	Group stage	0 – 1	(South Korea) Pohang Steelers	Pohang Steel Yard, Pohang, South Korea
4	2009	Group stage			
4	2009	Group stage	0 – 0	(South Korea) Pohang Steelers	TEDA Football Stadium, Tianjin, China
5	2009	Group stage			
5	2009	Group stage	3 – 1	(Japan) Kawasaki Frontale	TEDA Football Stadium, Tianjin, China
6	2009	Group stage			
6	2009	Group stage	1 – 0	(Australia) Central Coast Mariners	Bluetongue Stadium, Gosford, Australia
7	2011	Group stage			
7	2011	Group stage	1 – 0	(South Korea) Jeju United	Jeju World Cup Stadium, Jeju, South Korea
8	2011	Group stage			
8	2011	Group stage	2 – 1	(Japan) Gamba Osaka	TEDA Football Stadium, Tianjin, China
9	2011	Group stage			
9	2011	Group stage	1 – 1	(Australia) Melbourne Victory	TEDA Football Stadium, Tianjin, China
10	2011	Group stage			
10	2011	Group stage	1 – 2	(Australia) Melbourne Victory	Docklands Stadium, Melbourne, Australia
11	2011	Group stage			
11	2011	Group stage	3 – 0	(South Korea) Jeju United	TEDA Football Stadium, Tianjin, China
12	2011	Group stage			
12	2011	Group stage	0 – 2	(Japan) Gamba Osaka	Osaka Expo '70 Stadium, Suita, Japan
13	2011				
13	2011	Round of 16	0 – 3	(South Korea) Jeonbuk Hyundai Motors	Jeonju World Cup Stadium, Jeonju, South Korea
14	2012	Group stage			
14	2012	Group stage	0 – 0	(Australia) Central Coast Mariners	TEDA Football Stadium, Tianjin, China
15	2012	Group stage			
15	2012	Group stage	1 – 1	(South Korea) Seongnam Ilhwa Chunma	Tancheon Sports Complex, Seongnam, South Korea
16	2012	Group stage			
16	2012	Group stage	0 – 3	(Japan) Nagoya Grampus	TEDA Football Stadium, Tianjin, China
17	2012	Group stage			
17	2012	Group stage	0 – 0	(Japan) Nagoya Grampus	Mizuho Athletic Stadium, Nagoya, Japan
18	2012	Group stage			
18	2012	Group stage	1 – 5	(Australia) Central Coast Mariners	Central Coast Stadium, Gosford, Australia
19	2012	Group stage			
19	2012	Group stage	0 – 3	(South Korea) Seongnam Ilhwa Chunma	TEDA Football Stadium, Tianjin, China

== Statistics by opponent ==
=== A-League ===
Against Australian clubs
Team	Pld	W	D	L	GF	GA	GD	Pts
(China) Guangzhou Evergrande	11	7	0	4	20	13	+7	21
(China) Beijing Guoan	10	4	3	3	9	7	+2	15
(China) Shandong Luneng Taishan	7	3	3	1	9	8	+1	12
(China) Shanghai SIPG	7	3	1	3	19	13	+6	10
(China) Jiangsu Suning	2	2	0	0	3	1	+2	6
(China) Tianjin Teda	6	1	3	2	6	10	−4	6
(China) Shanghai Shenhua	7	0	4	3	6	10	−4	4
(China) Guangzhou R&F	1	1	0	0	3	1	+2	3
(China) Guizhou Renhe	4	1	0	3	3	9	−6	3
(China) Changchun Yatai	2	0	2	0	0	0	0	2
Total	57	22	16	19	78	72	+6	82

=== Hong Kong Premier League ===
Against Hong Kong clubs
Team	Pld	W	D	L	GF	GA	GD	Pts
(China) Guangzhou Evergrande	2	2	0	0	13	0	+13	6
(China) Tianjin Quanjian	2	2	0	0	4	0	+4	6
Total	4	4	0	0	17	0	+17	12

=== I-League ===
Against Indian clubs
Team	Pld	W	D	L	GF	GA	GD	Pts
(China) Shandong Luneng Taishan	1	1	0	0	6	0	+6	3
Total	1	1	0	0	6	0	+6	3

=== Liga Indonesia ===
Against Indonesian clubs
Team	Pld	W	D	L	GF	GA	GD	Pts
(China) Shandong Luneng Taishan	6	4	1	1	20	6	+14	13
(China) Shanghai Shenhua	4	2	0	2	12	5	+7	6
(China) Dalian Shide	2	2	0	0	3	1	+2	6
(China) Changchun Yatai	2	1	0	1	9	2	+7	3
Total	14	9	1	4	44	14	+30	28

=== J. League ===
Against Japanese clubs
Team	Pld	W	D	L	GF	GA	GD	Pts
(China) Guangzhou Evergrande	26	13	8	5	46	24	+22	47
(China) Shanghai SIPG	13	7	2	4	16	13	+3	23
(China) Beijing Guoan	15	5	8	2	16	12	+4	23
(China) Shandong Luneng Taishan	15	7	2	6	22	24	−2	23
(China) Jiangsu Suning	6	3	2	1	7	3	+4	11
(China) Shanghai Shenhua	11	2	5	4	12	16	−4	11
(China) Tianjin Teda	6	2	1	3	5	8	−3	7
(China) Tianjin Quanjian	4	1	1	2	4	8	−4	4
(China) Dalian Shide	3	1	1	1	2	3	−1	4
(China) Hangzhou Greentown	2	1	0	1	2	1	+1	3
(China) Shenzhen Jianlibao	2	1	0	1	1	3	−2	3
(China) Guangzhou R&F	2	1	0	1	2	5	−3	3
(China) Henan Construction	2	0	2	0	2	2	0	2
(China) Guizhou Renhe	4	0	1	3	1	4	−3	1
(China) Changchun Yatai	2	0	0	2	0	2	−2	0
Total	113	44	33	36	138	128	+10	165

=== K-League ===
Against South Korean clubs
Team	Pld	W	D	L	GF	GA	GD	Pts
(China) Guangzhou Evergrande	19	7	8	4	31	22	+9	29
(China) Shanghai SIPG	9	4	2	3	10	14	−4	14
(China) Beijing Guoan	18	2	5	11	13	25	−12	11
(China) Shandong Luneng Taishan	17	2	5	10	18	35	−17	11
(China) Shanghai Shenhua	11	3	1	7	9	20	−11	10
(China) Tianjin Teda	7	2	2	3	5	8	−3	8
(China) Jiangsu Suning	6	2	1	3	8	13	−5	7
(China) Guizhou Renhe	4	1	3	0	6	4	+2	6
(China) Dalian Shide	3	2	0	1	5	4	+1	6
(China) Shenzhen Jianlibao	2	1	1	0	1	0	+1	4
(China) Changchun Yatai	4	1	1	2	4	5	−1	4
(China) Tianjin Quanjian	2	1	0	1	7	8	−1	3
(China) Guangzhou R&F	2	0	1	1	0	1	−1	1
(China) Hangzhou Greentown	2	0	1	1	1	4	−3	1
(China) Henan Construction	2	0	0	2	0	4	−4	0
Total	108	28	31	49	118	167	−49	115

=== Malaysia Super League ===
Against Malaysian clubs
Team	Pld	W	D	L	GF	GA	GD	Pts
(China) Shandong Luneng	1	1	0	0	2	1	+1	3
Total	1	1	0	0	2	1	+1	3

=== Philippines Football League ===
Against Filipino clubs
Team	Pld	W	D	L	GF	GA	GD	Pts
(China) Tianjin Quanjian	1	1	0	0	2	0	+2	3
Total	1	1	0	0	2	0	+2	3

=== Qatar Stars League ===
Against Qatari clubs
Team	Pld	W	D	L	GF	GA	GD	Pts
(China) Guangzhou Evergrande	2	2	0	0	6	1	+5	6
Total	2	2	0	0	6	1	+5	6

=== Saudi Premier League ===
Against Saudi Arabian clubs
Team	Pld	W	D	L	GF	GA	GD	Pts
(China) Shenzhen Jianlibao	2	1	0	1	4	3	1	3
(China) Guangzhou Evergrande	2	1	0	1	4	5	−1	3
(China) Dalian Shide	2	0	1	1	1	2	−1	1
(China) Shandong Luneng Taishan	2	0	1	1	3	8	−5	1
Total	8	2	2	4	12	18	−6	8

=== S. League ===
Against Singaporean clubs
Team	Pld	W	D	L	GF	GA	GD	Pts
(China) Shanghai Shenhua	4	3	1	0	10	3	+7	10
(China) Guangzhou R&F	1	1	0	0	3	0	+3	3
(China) Henan Construction	2	0	1	1	1	2	−1	1
Total	7	4	2	1	14	5	+9	14

=== Thai Premier League ===
Against Thai clubs
Team	Pld	W	D	L	GF	GA	GD	Pts
(China) Beijing Guoan	7	6	0	1	20	8	+12	18
(China) Shanghai SIPG	4	4	0	0	10	0	+10	12
(China) Guangzhou Evergrande	6	3	2	1	13	6	+7	11
(China) Shandong Luneng Taishan	6	3	2	1	9	2	+7	11
(China) Dalian Shide	3	3	0	0	12	2	+10	9
(China) Jiangsu Suning	2	1	0	1	2	2	0	3
(China) Shanghai Shenhua	3	1	0	2	3	6	−3	3
(China) Guangzhou R&F	2	0	0	2	1	7	−6	0
Total	33	21	4	8	70	33	+37	67

=== UAE League ===
Against UAE clubs
Team	Pld	W	D	L	GF	GA	GD	Pts
(China) Guangzhou Evergrande	2	1	1	0	1	0	+1	4
(China) Dalian Shide	2	1	0	1	6	7	−1	3
(China) Hangzhou Greentown	2	0	1	1	0	1	−1	1
(China) Shenzhen Jianlibao	2	0	1	1	0	6	−6	1
Total	8	2	3	3	7	14	−7	9

=== Uzbek League ===
Against Uzbek clubs
Team	Pld	W	D	L	GF	GA	GD	Pts
(China) Beijing Guoan	2	0	1	1	0	1	−1	1
Total	2	0	1	1	0	1	−1	1

=== V-League ===
Against Vietnamese clubs
Team	Pld	W	D	L	GF	GA	GD	Pts
(China) Shandong Luneng Taishan	5	5	0	0	17	6	+11	15
(China) Dalian Shide	4	3	0	1	6	3	+3	9
(China) Shenzhen Jianlibao	2	2	0	0	7	0	+7	6
(China) Changchun Yatai	2	2	0	0	7	1	+6	6
(China) Beijing Guoan	2	2	0	0	6	1	+5	6
(China) Shanghai Shenhua	2	2	0	0	7	3	+4	6
(China) Jiangsu Suning	2	1	1	0	4	1	+3	4
Total	19	17	1	1	54	15	+39	52

== Top scorers ==
Bold Active in Chinese league teams

Footballer	Club	2003	2004	2005	2006	2007	2008	2009	2010	2011	2012	2013	2014	2015	2016	2017	2018	2019	Total
(Brazil) (China) Elkeson	Guangzhou Evergrande; Shanghai SIPG											6	6	3	4	5	4	1	29
(Brazil) Ricardo Goulart	Guangzhou Evergrande													8	3	7	7		25
(Brazil) Muriqui	Guangzhou Evergrande										3	13	2						18
(China) Gao Lin	Shanghai Shenhua; Guangzhou Evergrande				5	1					2	3	3	1	2				17
(Argentina) Darío Conca	Guangzhou Evergrande; Shanghai SIPG										6	8			2				16
(China) Wu Lei	Shanghai SIPG														7	5	1		13
(Brazil) Hulk	Shanghai SIPG															9	3	1	13
(China) Han Peng	Shandong Luneng			2		2		3	2	1			1						11
(Brazil) Alan Carvalho	Guangzhou Evergrande															7	4		11
(China) Yang Xu	Shandong Luneng; Tianjin Quanjian													6	4		1		11
(China) Hao Haidong	Dalian Shide	9	1																10
(China) Wang Yongpo	Shandong Luneng; Tianjin Quanjian					3				2				2	1		1		9
(Slovenia) Ermin Šiljak	Dalian Shide		8																8
(China) Li Jinyu	Shandong Luneng			1		3		2	1										7
(China) Zheng Zhi	Shandong Luneng; Guangzhou Evergrande			5								1		1					7
(Brazil) Oscar	Shanghai SIPG															3	4		7
(Brazil) Paulinho	Guangzhou Evergrande													1		5		1	7
(Argentina) Walter Montillo	Shandong Luneng													2	4				6
(Brazil) Diego Tardelli	Shandong Luneng														6				6
(China) Zou Jie	Dalian Shide	1	1		4														6
(China) Huang Bowen	Guangzhou Evergrande										1		1	3			1		6
(Italy) Graziano Pellè	Shandong Luneng																	6	6
(Honduras) Saul Martínez	Shanghai Shenhua	3	2																5
(China) Li Yi	Shenzhen Jianlibao			5															5
(China) Shao Jiayi	Beijing Guoan										1	1	2	1					5
(Brazil) Vágner Love	Shandong Luneng												5						5
(Brazil) Alex Teixeira	Jiangsu Suning														2	3			5
(France) Anthony Modeste	Tianjin Quanjian																5		5
