= 2016 AFC Champions League qualifying play-off =

The 2016 AFC Champions League qualifying play-off was played from 27 January to 9 February 2016. A total of 21 teams competed in the qualifying play-off to decide eight of the 32 places in the group stage of the 2016 AFC Champions League.

== Teams ==
The following 21 teams (8 from West Zone, 13 from East Zone) entered the qualifying play-off, which consisted of three rounds (preliminary round 1, preliminary round 2, play-off round):

- Two teams (both from East Zone) entered in the preliminary round 1.
- Seven teams (all from East Zone) entered in the preliminary round 2.
- Twelve teams (8 from West Zone, 4 from East Zone) entered in the play-off round.

Zone	Teams entering in play-off round	Teams entering in preliminary round 2	Teams entering in preliminary round 1
West Zone	(Saudi Arabia) Al-Ittihad; (Iran) Naft Tehran; (Uzbekistan) Bunyodkor; (United Arab Emirates) Al-Jazira; (United Arab Emirates) Al-Shabab; (Qatar) Al-Sadd; (Qatar) El Jaish; (Jordan) Al-Wehdat		
East Zone	(South Korea) Pohang Steelers; (Japan) FC Tokyo; (Australia) Adelaide United; (China) Shanghai SIPG	(China) Shandong Luneng; (Thailand) Muangthong United; (Thailand) Chonburi; (Vietnam) Hà Nội T&T; (Hong Kong) Kitchee; (Myanmar) Yangon United; (Malaysia) Johor Darul Ta'zim	(India) Mohun Bagan; (Singapore) Tampines Rovers

== Format ==
In the qualifying play-off, each tie was played as a single match. Extra time and penalty shoot-out were used to decide the winner if necessary (Regulations Article 10.2). The eight winners of the play-off round advanced to the group stage to join the 24 direct entrants. All losers in each round which were from associations with only play-off slots entered the AFC Cup group stage.

== Schedule ==
The schedule of each round was as follows.

Round	Match date
Preliminary round 1	27 January 2016
Preliminary round 2	2 February 2016
Play-off round	9 February 2016

== Bracket ==
The bracket of the qualifying play-off was determined by the AFC based on the association ranking of each team, with the team from the higher-ranked association hosting each match. Teams from the same association could not be placed in the same play-off.

=== Play-off West 1 ===
Al-Ittihad advanced to Group A.

Preliminary round 1	Preliminary round 2	Play-off round
		(Saudi Arabia) Al-Ittihad	2
		(Jordan) Al-Wehdat	1

=== Play-off West 2 ===
El Jaish advanced to Group D.

Preliminary round 1	Preliminary round 2	Play-off round
		(Iran) Naft Tehran	0
		(Qatar) El Jaish	2

=== Play-off West 3 ===
Bunyodkor advanced to Group B.

Preliminary round 1	Preliminary round 2	Play-off round
		(Uzbekistan) Bunyodkor	2
		(United Arab Emirates) Al-Shabab	0

=== Play-off West 4 ===
Al-Jazira advanced to Group C.

Preliminary round 1	Preliminary round 2	Play-off round
		(United Arab Emirates) Al-Jazira (p)	2 (5)
		(Qatar) Al-Sadd	2 (4)

=== Play-off East 1 ===
Pohang Steelers advanced to Group H.

Preliminary round 1	Preliminary round 2		Play-off round
			(South Korea) Pohang Steelers	3
			(Vietnam) Hà Nội T&T	0
	(Vietnam) Hà Nội T&T	1
	(Hong Kong) Kitchee	0

=== Play-off East 2 ===
FC Tokyo advanced to Group E.

Preliminary round 1	Preliminary round 2		Play-off round
			(Japan) FC Tokyo	9
			(Thailand) Chonburi	0
	(Thailand) Chonburi (a.e.t.)	3
	(Myanmar) Yangon United	2

=== Play-off East 3 ===
Shandong Luneng advanced to Group F.

Preliminary round 1		Preliminary round 2		Play-off round
				(Australia) Adelaide United	1
				(China) Shandong Luneng	2
		(China) Shandong Luneng	6
(India) Mohun Bagan	3	(India) Mohun Bagan	0
(Singapore) Tampines Rovers	1

=== Play-off East 4 ===
Shanghai SIPG advanced to Group G.

Preliminary round 1	Preliminary round 2		Play-off round
			(China) Shanghai SIPG	3
			(Thailand) Muangthong United	0
	(Thailand) Muangthong United (p)	0 (3)
	(Malaysia) Johor Darul Ta'zim	0 (0)

== Preliminary round 1 ==
East Zone
Team 1	Score	Team 2
Mohun Bagan (India)	3–1	(Singapore) Tampines Rovers

27 January 2016
19:00 UTC+5:30

Mohun Bagan (India)	3–1	(Singapore) Tampines Rovers
Lalpekhlua 6'; Glen 42'; Yusa 84'	Report	Yasir 44'

Salt Lake Stadium, Kolkata
Attendance: 12,640
Referee: Jarred Gillett (Australia)

== Preliminary round 2 ==
East Zone
Team 1	Score	Team 2
Hà Nội T&T (Vietnam)	1–0	(Hong Kong) Kitchee
Chonburi (Thailand)	3–2 (a.e.t.)	(Myanmar) Yangon United
Shandong Luneng (China)	6–0	(India) Mohun Bagan
Muangthong United (Thailand)	0–0 (a.e.t.) (3–0 p)	(Malaysia) Johor Darul Ta'zim

2 February 2016
15:00 UTC+8

Shandong Luneng (China)	6–0	(India) Mohun Bagan
Montillo 24'; Tardelli 40'; Yang Xu 55', 69'; Zheng Zheng 76'; Wang Yongpo 88'	Report

Jinan Olympic Sports Center Stadium, Jinan
Attendance: 15,109
Referee: Mohanad Qasim Eesee Sarray (Iraq)

2 February 2016
18:00 UTC+7

Hà Nội T&T (Vietnam)	1–0	(Hong Kong) Kitchee
Marronkle 61'	Report

Hàng Đẫy Stadium, Hanoi
Attendance: 1,500
Referee: Yudai Yamamoto (Japan)

2 February 2016
19:00 UTC+7

Chonburi (Thailand)	3–2 (a.e.t.)	(Myanmar) Yangon United
Anderson 63'; Suttinan 81'; Kroekrit 105+1'	Report	Fernandes 19'; Kyaw Ko Ko 79'

Chonburi Stadium, Chonburi
Attendance: 3,886
Referee: Abdulrahman Abdou (Qatar)

2 February 2016
19:30 UTC+7

Muangthong United (Thailand)	0–0 (a.e.t.)	(Malaysia) Johor Darul Ta'zim
	Report
Penalties
Cleiton Silva (penalty scored); Peerapat (penalty scored); Sarach (penalty scored)	3–0	(penalty missed) Díaz; (penalty missed) António; (penalty missed) Harun

SCG Stadium, Nonthaburi
Attendance: 11,446
Referee: Kim Sang-woo (South Korea)

== Play-off round ==
West Zone
Team 1	Score	Team 2
Al-Ittihad (Saudi Arabia)	2–1	(Jordan) Al-Wehdat
Naft Tehran (Iran)	0–2	(Qatar) El Jaish
Bunyodkor (Uzbekistan)	2–0	(United Arab Emirates) Al-Shabab
Al-Jazira (United Arab Emirates)	2–2 (a.e.t.) (5–4 p)	(Qatar) Al-Sadd

East Zone
Team 1	Score	Team 2
Pohang Steelers (South Korea)	3–0	(Vietnam) Hà Nội T&T
FC Tokyo (Japan)	9–0	(Thailand) Chonburi
Adelaide United (Australia)	1–2	(China) Shandong Luneng
Shanghai SIPG (China)	3–0	(Thailand) Muangthong United

=== West Zone ===
9 February 2016
17:00 UTC+5

Bunyodkor (Uzbekistan)	2–0	(United Arab Emirates) Al-Shabab
Shomurodov 2', 35'	Report

Bunyodkor Stadium, Tashkent
Attendance: 9,485
Referee: Kim Dong-jin (South Korea)

9 February 2016
18:00 UTC+3:30

Naft Tehran (Iran)	0–2	(Qatar) El Jaish
	Report	Hamdallah 63'; Romarinho 90+4'

Azadi Stadium, Tehran
Attendance: 3,860
Referee: Mohd Amirul Izwan Yaacob (Malaysia)

9 February 2016
20:15 UTC+4

Al-Jazira (United Arab Emirates)	2–2 (a.e.t.)	(Qatar) Al-Sadd
Jones 45'; Mabkhout 65'	Report	Sanhaji 22', 88'
Penalties
Mabkhout (penalty scored); Juma (penalty scored); Rashid (penalty missed); Al-Shamsi (penalty scored); Neves (penalty missed); Park Jong-woo (penalty scored); Mousa (penalty scored)	5–4	(penalty missed) Xavi; (penalty scored) Al-Haidos; (penalty scored) Pedro Miguel; (penalty missed) Pouraliganji; (penalty scored) Belhadj; (penalty scored) Hassan; (penalty missed) Sanhaji

Mohammed Bin Zayed Stadium, Abu Dhabi
Attendance: 13,340
Referee: Ravshan Irmatov (Uzbekistan)

9 February 2016
20:20 UTC+3

Al-Ittihad (Saudi Arabia)	2–1	(Jordan) Al-Wehdat
Rivas 17'; Fallatah 45' (pen.)	Report	Elhadji Malick 11'

King Abdullah Sports City, Jeddah
Attendance: 58,555
Referee: Nawaf Shukralla (Bahrain)

=== East Zone ===
9 February 2016
14:00 UTC+9

Pohang Steelers (South Korea)	3–0	(Vietnam) Hà Nội T&T
Shim Dong-woon 35', 62', 84'	Report

Pohang Steel Yard, Pohang
Attendance: 2,877
Referee: Muhammad Taqi (Singapore)

9 February 2016
19:30 UTC+10:30

Adelaide United (Australia)	1–2	(China) Shandong Luneng
Cirio 90'	Report	Yang Xu 17'; Tardelli 39'

Hindmarsh Stadium, Adelaide
Attendance: 8,487
Referee: Minoru Tōjō (Japan)

9 February 2016
19:30 UTC+9

FC Tokyo (Japan)	9–0	(Thailand) Chonburi
Careca 6' (o.g.); Abe 9'; Higashi 34'; Maeda 54'; Yonemoto 55'; Mizunuma 61'; Kawano 73', 90+2' (pen.); Chonlatit 84' (o.g.)	Report

Ajinomoto Stadium, Tokyo
Attendance: 10,801
Referee: Kim Jong-hyeok (South Korea)

9 February 2016
19:30 UTC+8

Shanghai SIPG (China)	3–0	(Thailand) Muangthong United
Wu Lei 45', 88'; Conca 83'	Report

Shanghai Stadium, Shanghai
Attendance: 25,136
Referee: Peter Green (Australia)
