= 2016 AFC Champions League group stage =

International football tournament

The 2016 AFC Champions League group stage was played from 23 February to 4 May 2016. A total of 32 teams competed in the group stage to decide the 16 places in the knockout stage of the 2016 AFC Champions League.

== Draw ==
The draw for the group stage was held on 10 December 2015, 16:00 MYT (UTC+8), at the Petaling Jaya Hilton Hotel in Kuala Lumpur, Malaysia. The 32 teams were drawn into eight groups of four. Teams from the same association could not be drawn into the same group.

The seeding of each team in the draw was determined by their association and their qualifying position within their association. The mechanism of the draw was as follows:

- For the West Zone, a draw was held for the three associations with three direct entrants (Saudi Arabia, Iran, Uzbekistan) to determine the seeds 1 placed in order for Groups A, B and C. The remaining teams were then allocated to the groups according to the rules set by AFC.
- For the East Zone, a draw was held for the two associations with three direct entrants (South Korea, Japan) to determine the seeds 1 placed in order for Groups E and F. The remaining teams were then allocated to the groups according to the rules set by AFC.

The following 32 teams (16 from West Zone, 16 from East Zone) entered into the group-stage draw, which included the 24 direct entrants and the eight winners of the qualifying play-off, whose identity were not known at the time of the draw.

Zone	Seed 1	Seed 2	Seed 3	Seed 4
West Zone (Groups A–D)	(Saudi Arabia) Al-Nassr	(Saudi Arabia) Al-Hilal	(Saudi Arabia) Al-Ahli	(Saudi Arabia) Al-Ittihad (Winner Play-off West 1)
West Zone (Groups A–D)	(Iran) Sepahan	(Iran) Zob Ahan	(Iran) Tractor Sazi	(Qatar) El Jaish (Winner Play-off West 2)
West Zone (Groups A–D)	(Uzbekistan) Pakhtakor	(Uzbekistan) Nasaf Qarshi	(Uzbekistan) Lokomotiv Tashkent	(Uzbekistan) Bunyodkor (Winner Play-off West 3)
West Zone (Groups A–D)	(United Arab Emirates) Al-Ain	(United Arab Emirates) Al-Nasr	(Qatar) Lekhwiya	(United Arab Emirates) Al-Jazira (Winner Play-off West 4)
East Zone (Groups E–H)	(South Korea) Jeonbuk Hyundai Motors	(South Korea) FC Seoul	(South Korea) Suwon Samsung Bluewings	(South Korea) Pohang Steelers (Winner Play-off East 1)
East Zone (Groups E–H)	(Japan) Sanfrecce Hiroshima	(Japan) Gamba Osaka	(Japan) Urawa Red Diamonds	(Japan) FC Tokyo (Winner Play-off East 2)
East Zone (Groups E–H)	(Australia) Melbourne Victory	(Australia) Sydney FC	(Thailand) Buriram United	(China) Shandong Luneng (Winner Play-off East 3)
East Zone (Groups E–H)	(China) Guangzhou Evergrande	(China) Jiangsu Suning	(Vietnam) Becamex Bình Dương	(China) Shanghai SIPG (Winner Play-off East 4)

== Format ==
In the group stage, each group was played on a home-and-away round-robin basis. The winners and runners-up of each group advanced to the round of 16.

=== Tiebreakers ===
The teams were ranked according to points (3 points for a win, 1 point for a draw, 0 points for a loss). If tied on points, tiebreakers would be applied in the following order (Regulations Article 11.5):

1. Greater number of points obtained in the group matches between the teams concerned;
2. Goal difference resulting from the group matches between the teams concerned;
3. Greater number of goals scored in the group matches between the teams concerned;
4. Greater number of away goals scored in the group matches between the teams concerned;
5. If, after applying criteria 1 to 4, teams still have an equal ranking, criteria 1 to 4 are reapplied exclusively to the matches between the teams in question to determine their final rankings. If this procedure does not lead to a decision, criteria 6 to 10 apply;
6. Goal difference in all the group matches;
7. Greater number of goals scored in all the group matches;
8. Penalty shoot-out if only two teams are involved and they are both on the field of play;
9. Fewer score calculated according to the number of yellow and red cards received in the group matches (1 point for a single yellow card, 3 points for a red card as a consequence of two yellow cards, 3 points for a direct red card, 4 points for a yellow card followed by a direct red card);
10. Team who belongs to the member association with the higher AFC ranking.

== Schedule ==
The schedule of each matchday was as follows.

Matchday	Dates	Matches
Matchday 1	23–24 February 2016	Team 1 vs. Team 4, Team 3 vs. Team 2
Matchday 2	1–2 March 2016	Team 4 vs. Team 3, Team 2 vs. Team 1
Matchday 3	15–16 March 2016	Team 4 vs. Team 2, Team 1 vs. Team 3
Matchday 4	5–6 April 2016	Team 2 vs. Team 4, Team 3 vs. Team 1
Matchday 5	19–20 April 2016	Team 4 vs. Team 1, Team 2 vs. Team 3
Matchday 6	3–4 May 2016	Team 1 vs. Team 2, Team 3 vs. Team 4

On 25 January 2016, the AFC announced the following changes to the schedule due to Saudi Arabia's refusal to play in Iran after the attack on their diplomatic missions in Iran and the ensuing deterioration of Iran–Saudi Arabia relations:

- Group A: change matchday 1 (23 February) with matchday 6 (4 May)
- Group B: change matchday 2 (1 March) with matchday 5 (20 April)
- Group C: change matchday 1 (24 February) with matchday 6 (3 May)
- Group D: change matchday 2 (2 March) with matchday 5 (19 April)

After the changes, all matches between teams from Iran and Saudi Arabia (including possible play-off winners) were rescheduled to be played on matchdays 5 and 6 (19–20 April and 3–4 May). The venues of these matches would be decided after an evaluation deadline of 15 March 2016. As there had not been a return to normal relations between the two countries by then with Saudi Arabia refusing to lift their travel restrictions to Iran, the AFC accepted the Saudi Arabian Football Federation's proposal of playing all matches between teams from Iran and Saudi Arabia in neutral venues. This involved a total of six matches, two each in Groups A, B and C (no matches were moved in Group D as the play-off team from Iran failed to advance to the group).

On 31 March 2016, the AFC announced that they have approved the neutral venues, with teams from Iran moving their home matches to Oman, and teams from Saudi Arabia moving their home matches to Qatar and the United Arab Emirates.

== Groups ==
=== Group A ===
Pos	Team	Pld	W	D	L	GF	GA	GD	Pts	Qualification	LOK	NAS	ITT	SEP
1	(Uzbekistan) Lokomotiv Tashkent	6	2	4	0	6	3	+3	10	Advance to knockout stage	—	0–0	1–1	1–0
2	(United Arab Emirates) Al-Nasr	6	2	3	1	5	4	+1	9	Advance to knockout stage	1–1	—	0–0	2–0
3	(Saudi Arabia) Al-Ittihad	6	2	3	1	9	4	+5	9		1–1	1–2	—	4–0
4	(Iran) Sepahan	6	1	0	5	2	11	−9	3		0–2	2–0	0–2	—

Source: AFC
Rules for classification: Group stage tiebreakers
23 February 2016
15:00 UTC+5

Lokomotiv Tashkent (Uzbekistan)	1–1	(Saudi Arabia) Al-Ittihad
Mirzaev 89'	Report	Rivas 34'

Lokomotiv Stadium, Tashkent
Attendance: 2,203
Referee: Ben Williams (Australia)
23 February 2016
18:30 UTC+3:30

Sepahan (Iran)	2–0	(United Arab Emirates) Al-Nasr
Chimba 14', 51'	Report

Foolad Shahr Stadium, Isfahan
Attendance: 5,750
Referee: Hettikamkanamge Perera (Sri Lanka)

1 March 2016
20:30 UTC+4

Al-Nasr (United Arab Emirates)	2–0	(Iran) Sepahan
Nilmar 57'; Pitroipa 90+3' (pen.)	Report

Al-Maktoum Stadium, Dubai
Attendance: 3,200
Referee: Ko Hyung-jin (South Korea)
1 March 2016
20:30 UTC+3

Al-Ittihad (Saudi Arabia)	1–1	(Uzbekistan) Lokomotiv Tashkent
Muntari 14'	Report	Abdukholiqov 80' (pen.)

King Abdullah Sports City, Jeddah
Attendance: 37,671
Referee: Kim Dong-jin (South Korea)

15 March 2016
16:00 UTC+3:30

Sepahan (Iran)	0–2	(Uzbekistan) Lokomotiv Tashkent
	Report	Bikmaev 14'; Mirzaev 86'

Foolad Shahr Stadium, Isfahan
Attendance: 1,620
Referee: Ryuji Sato (Japan)
15 March 2016
20:35 UTC+3

Al-Ittihad (Saudi Arabia)	1–2	(United Arab Emirates) Al-Nasr
Rivas 13'	Report	Nilmar 1', 74'

King Abdullah Sports City, Jeddah
Attendance: 39,998
Referee: Minoru Tōjō (Japan)

6 April 2016
16:00 UTC+5

Lokomotiv Tashkent (Uzbekistan)	1–0	(Iran) Sepahan
Abdukholiqov 54'	Report

Lokomotiv Stadium, Tashkent
Attendance: 2,620
Referee: Ali Abdulnabi (Bahrain)
6 April 2016
20:45 UTC+4

Al-Nasr (United Arab Emirates)	0–0	(Saudi Arabia) Al-Ittihad
	Report

Al-Maktoum Stadium, Dubai
Attendance: 7,250
Referee: Chris Beath (Australia)

20 April 2016
17:55 UTC+4

Al-Nasr (United Arab Emirates)	1–1	(Uzbekistan) Lokomotiv Tashkent
Ekoko 31'	Report	Abdukholiqov 43'

Al-Maktoum Stadium, Dubai
Attendance: 6,246
Referee: Liu Kwok Man (Hong Kong)
20 April 2016
19:00 UTC+3

Al-Ittihad (Saudi Arabia)	4–0	(Iran) Sepahan
Al-Ghamdi 45+2', 86'; Al-Muwallad 83'; Rivas 90+1'	Report

Jassim Bin Hamad Stadium, Al Rayyan (Qatar) (Note: Matches between teams from Iran and Saudi Arabia were played on neutral venues due to deterioration of Iran–Saudi Arabia relations.)
Attendance: 1,352
Referee: Kim Jong-hyeok (South Korea)

4 May 2016
19:00 UTC+4

Sepahan (Iran)	0–2	(Saudi Arabia) Al-Ittihad
	Report	Sânmărtean 15'; Al-Nadhri 74'

Sultan Qaboos Sports Complex, Muscat (Oman)
Attendance: 5,250
Referee: Mohd Amirul Izwan Yaacob (Malaysia)
4 May 2016
20:00 UTC+5

Lokomotiv Tashkent (Uzbekistan)	0–0	(United Arab Emirates) Al-Nasr
	Report

Bunyodkor Stadium, Tashkent
Attendance: 3,303
Referee: Abdulrahman Al-Jassim (Qatar)

=== Group B ===
Pos	Team	Pld	W	D	L	GF	GA	GD	Pts	Qualification	ZOB	LEK	NSR	BYD
1	(Iran) Zob Ahan	6	4	2	0	12	2	+10	14	Advance to knockout stage	—	0–0	3–0	5–2
2	(Qatar) Lekhwiya	6	2	3	1	7	2	+5	9	Advance to knockout stage	0–1	—	4–0	0–0
3	(Saudi Arabia) Al-Nassr	6	1	2	3	5	14	−9	5		0–3	1–1	—	3–3
4	(Uzbekistan) Bunyodkor	6	0	3	3	5	11	−6	3		0–0	0–2	0–1	—

Source: AFC
Rules for classification: Group stage tiebreakers
23 February 2016
18:15 UTC+3

Lekhwiya (Qatar)	0–1	(Iran) Zob Ahan
	Report	Rajabzadeh 46'

Abdullah bin Khalifa Stadium, Doha
Attendance: 1,225
Referee: Kim Jong-hyeok (South Korea)
23 February 2016
20:15 UTC+3

Al-Nassr (Saudi Arabia)	3–3	(Uzbekistan) Bunyodkor
Mierzejewski 45+1' (pen.); Al-Shehri 79'; Abdulghani 85'	Report	Khamdamov 3', 76'; Zouaghi 33'

King Fahd International Stadium, Riyadh
Attendance: 11,138
Referee: Ko Hyung-jin (South Korea)

1 March 2016
18:00 UTC+5

Bunyodkor (Uzbekistan)	0–1	(Saudi Arabia) Al-Nassr
	Report	Maïga 36'

Bunyodkor Stadium, Tashkent
Attendance: 8,027
Referee: Mohd Amirul Izwan Yaacob (Malaysia)
1 March 2016
18:45 UTC+3:30

Zob Ahan (Iran)	0–0	(Qatar) Lekhwiya
	Report

Foolad Shahr Stadium, Isfahan
Attendance: 4,000
Referee: Yudai Yamamoto (Japan)

16 March 2016
18:00 UTC+5

Bunyodkor (Uzbekistan)	0–0	(Iran) Zob Ahan
	Report

Bunyodkor Stadium, Tashkent
Attendance: 4,567
Referee: Peter Green (Australia)
16 March 2016
20:15 UTC+3

Al-Nassr (Saudi Arabia)	1–1	(Qatar) Lekhwiya
Ghaleb 88' (pen.)	Report	Kaluyituka 7'

King Fahd International Stadium, Riyadh
Attendance: 8,590
Referee: Ali Abdulnabi (Bahrain)

5 April 2016
20:00 UTC+4:30

Zob Ahan (Iran)	5–2	(Uzbekistan) Bunyodkor
Esmaeilifar 3'; Mohammadzadeh 34'; Rajabzadeh 50'; Rezaei 69'; Tabrizi 87'	Report	Zouaghi 78'; Nurmatov 89'

Foolad Shahr Stadium, Isfahan
Attendance: 4,523
Referee: Ma Ning (China)
5 April 2016
18:30 UTC+3

Lekhwiya (Qatar)	4–0	(Saudi Arabia) Al-Nassr
Nam Tae-hee 49'; Kaluyituka 70'; Flores 84'; Muntari 86'	Report

Abdullah bin Khalifa Stadium, Doha
Attendance: 4,050
Referee: Ahmed Al-Kaf (Oman)

20 April 2016
19:00 UTC+5

Bunyodkor (Uzbekistan)	0–2	(Qatar) Lekhwiya
	Report	Boudiaf 65'; Muntari 79'

Bunyodkor Stadium, Tashkent
Attendance: 3,017
Referee: Hettikamkanamge Perera (Sri Lanka)
20 April 2016
20:30 UTC+4

Zob Ahan (Iran)	3–0	(Saudi Arabia) Al-Nassr
Pahlavan 27', 83'; Rezaei 74'	Report

Sultan Qaboos Sports Complex, Muscat (Oman)
Attendance: 3,400
Referee: Ryuji Sato (Japan)

4 May 2016
21:15 UTC+4

Al-Nassr (Saudi Arabia)	0–3	(Iran) Zob Ahan
	Report	Pahlavan 30'; Hassanzadeh 42' (pen.); Beikzadeh 87'

Al-Rashid Stadium, Dubai (United Arab Emirates)
Attendance: 886
Referee: Muhammad Taqi (Singapore)
4 May 2016
20:15 UTC+3

Lekhwiya (Qatar)	0–0	(Uzbekistan) Bunyodkor
	Report

Abdullah bin Khalifa Stadium, Doha
Attendance: 1,100
Referee: Kim Dong-jin (South Korea)

=== Group C ===
Pos	Team	Pld	W	D	L	GF	GA	GD	Pts	Qualification	TRA	HIL	PAK	JAZ
1	(Iran) Tractor Sazi	6	4	0	2	10	3	+7	12	Advance to knockout stage	—	1–2	2–0	4–0
2	(Saudi Arabia) Al-Hilal	6	3	2	1	10	7	+3	11	Advance to knockout stage	0–2	—	4–1	1–0
3	(Uzbekistan) Pakhtakor	6	3	1	2	10	9	+1	10		1–0	2–2	—	3–0
4	(United Arab Emirates) Al-Jazira	6	0	1	5	2	13	−11	1		0–1	1–1	1–3	—

Source: AFC
Rules for classification: Group stage tiebreakers
24 February 2016
16:30 UTC+5

Pakhtakor (Uzbekistan)	2–2	(Saudi Arabia) Al-Hilal
Sergeev 70'; Khashimov 89'	Report	Al-Qahtani 60'; Al-Salem 84'

Pakhtakor Markaziy Stadium, Tashkent
Attendance: 3,800
Referee: Chris Beath (Australia)
24 February 2016
16:00 UTC+3:30

Tractor Sazi (Iran)	4–0	(United Arab Emirates) Al-Jazira
Rahmani 4', 60'; Khalilzadeh 10'; Sharifi 54'	Report

Sahand Stadium, Tabriz
Attendance: 13,452
Referee: Muhammad Taqi (Singapore)

2 March 2016
20:30 UTC+4

Al-Jazira (United Arab Emirates)	0–1	(Iran) Tractor Sazi
	Report	Rahmani 31'

Mohammed Bin Zayed Stadium, Abu Dhabi
Attendance: 6,820
Referee: Hettikamkanamge Perera (Sri Lanka)
2 March 2016
20:30 UTC+3

Al-Hilal (Saudi Arabia)	4–1	(Uzbekistan) Pakhtakor
Al-Zori 55'; Orahovac 58' (o.g.); Kaabi 61', 78'	Report	Sergeev 31'

Prince Faisal bin Fahd Stadium, Riyadh
Attendance: 9,456
Referee: Nawaf Shukralla (Bahrain)

15 March 2016
17:00 UTC+5

Pakhtakor (Uzbekistan)	1–0	(Iran) Tractor Sazi
Sergeev 41'	Report

Pakhtakor Markaziy Stadium, Tashkent
Attendance: 2,223
Referee: Kim Dong-jin (South Korea)
15 March 2016
20:35 UTC+4

Al-Jazira (United Arab Emirates)	1–1	(Saudi Arabia) Al-Hilal
Juma 90+4'	Report	Aílton 9'

Mohammed Bin Zayed Stadium, Abu Dhabi
Attendance: 14,372
Referee: Ko Hyung-jin (South Korea)

6 April 2016
19:15 UTC+4:30

Tractor Sazi (Iran)	2–0	(Uzbekistan) Pakhtakor
Augusto 59'; Aghaei 83'	Report

Sahand Stadium, Tabriz
Attendance: 33,450
Referee: Yudai Yamamoto (Japan)
6 April 2016
20:45 UTC+3

Al-Hilal (Saudi Arabia)	1–0	(United Arab Emirates) Al-Jazira
Aílton 36'	Report

Prince Faisal bin Fahd Stadium, Riyadh
Attendance: 10,316
Referee: Mohd Amirul Izwan Yaacob (Malaysia)

19 April 2016
18:35 UTC+3

Al-Hilal (Saudi Arabia)	0–2	(Iran) Tractor Sazi
	Report	Nong 66'; Hatami 81'

Suheim Bin Hamad Stadium, Doha (Qatar)
Attendance: 2,642
Referee: Peter Green (Australia)
19 April 2016
20:50 UTC+4

Al-Jazira (United Arab Emirates)	1–3	(Uzbekistan) Pakhtakor
Mabkhout 62' (pen.)	Report	Karimov 10'; Sergeev 64', 83' (pen.)

Mohammed Bin Zayed Stadium, Abu Dhabi
Attendance: 1,292
Referee: Jarred Gillett (Australia)

3 May 2016
19:30 UTC+5

Pakhtakor (Uzbekistan)	3–0	(United Arab Emirates) Al-Jazira
Berdiev 13'; Talipov 24'; Masharipov 80'	Report

Pakhtakor Markaziy Stadium, Tashkent
Attendance: 4,527
Referee: Ma Ning (China)
3 May 2016
18:30 UTC+4

Tractor Sazi (Iran)	1–2	(Saudi Arabia) Al-Hilal
Nong 48'	Report	Al-Dawsari 15'; Aílton 71'

Sultan Qaboos Sports Complex, Muscat (Oman)
Attendance: 8,545
Referee: Kim Jong-hyeok (South Korea)

=== Group D ===
Pos	Team	Pld	W	D	L	GF	GA	GD	Pts	Qualification	JSH	AIN	AHL	NSF
1	(Qatar) El Jaish	6	3	1	2	6	8	−2	10	Advance to knockout stage	—	2–1	1–4	1–0
2	(United Arab Emirates) Al-Ain	6	3	1	2	8	6	+2	10	Advance to knockout stage	1–2	—	1–0	2–0
3	(Saudi Arabia) Al-Ahli	6	3	0	3	10	7	+3	9		2–0	1–2	—	2–1
4	(Uzbekistan) Nasaf Qarshi	6	1	2	3	4	7	−3	5		0–0	1–1	2–1	—

Source: AFC
Rules for classification: Group stage tiebreakers
24 February 2016
19:00 UTC+4

Al-Ain (United Arab Emirates)	1–2	(Qatar) El Jaish
Douglas 65' (pen.)	Report	Hamdallah 9'; Romarinho 45'

Hazza Bin Zayed Stadium, Al Ain
Attendance: 8,226
Referee: Minoru Tōjō (Japan)
24 February 2016
20:10 UTC+3

Al-Ahli (Saudi Arabia)	2–1	(Uzbekistan) Nasaf Qarshi
Al Fatil 2'; Al-Somah 47'	Report	Abdukhalikov 29'

King Abdullah Sports City, Jeddah
Attendance: 17,161
Referee: Ryuji Sato (Japan)

2 March 2016
18:00 UTC+5

Nasaf Qarshi (Uzbekistan)	2–1	(Saudi Arabia) Al-Ahli
Abdukhalikov 47'; Karimov 60'	Report	Assiri 71' (pen.)

Qarshi Markaziy Stadium, Qarshi
Attendance: 16,221
Referee: Ma Ning (China)
2 March 2016
18:30 UTC+3

El Jaish (Qatar)	2–1	(United Arab Emirates) Al-Ain
Hamdallah 49'; Abubakar 79'	Report	Al-Kathiri 86'

Abdullah bin Khalifa Stadium, Doha
Attendance: 6,470
Referee: Kim Sang-woo (South Korea)

16 March 2016
19:10 UTC+4

Al-Ain (United Arab Emirates)	1–0	(Saudi Arabia) Al-Ahli
O. Abdulrahman 71'	Report

Hazza Bin Zayed Stadium, Al Ain
Attendance: 12,473
Referee: Adham Makhadmeh (Jordan)
16 March 2016
18:45 UTC+3

El Jaish (Qatar)	1–0	(Uzbekistan) Nasaf Qarshi
Rashidov 87'	Report

Abdullah bin Khalifa Stadium, Doha
Attendance: 5,240
Referee: Ahmed Al-Kaf (Oman)

5 April 2016
18:45 UTC+5

Nasaf Qarshi (Uzbekistan)	0–0	(Qatar) El Jaish
	Report

Qarshi Markaziy Stadium, Qarshi
Attendance: 16,000
Referee: Liu Kwok Man (Hong Kong)
5 April 2016
20:25 UTC+3

Al-Ahli (Saudi Arabia)	1–2	(United Arab Emirates) Al-Ain
Al-Amri 90+3'	Report	Douglas 25', 77'

King Abdullah Sports City, Jeddah
Attendance: 13,608
Referee: Hettikamkanamge Perera (Sri Lanka)

19 April 2016
19:30 UTC+5

Nasaf Qarshi (Uzbekistan)	1–1	(United Arab Emirates) Al-Ain
Karimov 1'	Report	Asprilla 32'

Qarshi Markaziy Stadium, Qarshi
Attendance: 10,952
Referee: Kim Dong-jin (South Korea)
19 April 2016
19:00 UTC+3

El Jaish (Qatar)	1–4	(Saudi Arabia) Al-Ahli
Hamdallah 51'	Report	Seraj 22', 57'; Assiri 43'; M. Hawsawi 52'

Abdullah bin Khalifa Stadium, Doha
Attendance: 3,250
Referee: Ben Williams (Australia)

3 May 2016
20:30 UTC+4

Al-Ain (United Arab Emirates)	2–0	(Uzbekistan) Nasaf Qarshi
Asprilla 39'; Ahmed 90'	Report

Hazza Bin Zayed Stadium, Al Ain
Attendance: 8,163
Referee: Minoru Tōjō (Japan)
3 May 2016
19:30 UTC+3

Al-Ahli (Saudi Arabia)	2–0	(Qatar) El Jaish
Marquinho 62'; O. Hawsawi 85'	Report

King Abdullah Sports City, Jeddah
Attendance: 6,850
Referee: Mohanad Qasim Eesee Sarray (Iraq)

=== Group E ===
Pos	Team	Pld	W	D	L	GF	GA	GD	Pts	Qualification	JHM	TOK	JIA	BBD
1	(South Korea) Jeonbuk Hyundai Motors	6	3	1	2	13	9	+4	10	Advance to knockout stage	—	2–1	2–2	2–0
2	(Japan) FC Tokyo	6	3	1	2	8	8	0	10	Advance to knockout stage	0–3	—	0–0	3–1
3	(China) Jiangsu Suning	6	2	3	1	10	7	+3	9		3–2	1–2	—	3–0
4	(Vietnam) Becamex Binh Duong	6	1	1	4	6	13	−7	4		3–2	1–2	1–1	—

Source: AFC
Rules for classification: Group stage tiebreakers
23 February 2016
19:00 UTC+9

Jeonbuk Hyundai Motors (South Korea)	2–1	(Japan) FC Tokyo
Ko Moo-yeol 39'; Lee Dong-gook 83'	Report	Abe 87'

Jeonju World Cup Stadium, Jeonju
Attendance: 15,155
Referee: Mohd Amirul Izwan (Malaysia)
23 February 2016
17:00 UTC+7

Becamex Bình Dương (Vietnam)	1–1	(China) Jiangsu Suning
Nguyễn Anh Đức 28' (pen.)	Report	Ji Xiang 13'

Gò Đậu Stadium, Thủ Dầu Một
Attendance: 11,800
Referee: Alireza Faghani (Iran)

1 March 2016
19:30 UTC+9

FC Tokyo (Japan)	3–1	(Vietnam) Becamex Bình Dương
Burns 50'; Bùi Tấn Trường 67' (o.g.); Maeda 84'	Report	Nguyễn Anh Đức 24'

Ajinomoto Stadium, Tokyo
Attendance: 7,760
Referee: Ilgiz Tantashev (Uzbekistan)
1 March 2016
20:00 UTC+8

Jiangsu Suning (China)	3–2	(South Korea) Jeonbuk Hyundai Motors
Alex Teixeira 16'; Jô 65'; Wu Xi 69'	Report	Lee Dong-gook 62'; Sainsbury 86' (o.g.)

Nanjing Olympic Sports Centre, Nanjing
Attendance: 34,175
Referee: Ravshan Irmatov (Uzbekistan)

15 March 2016
19:00 UTC+9

Jeonbuk Hyundai Motors (South Korea)	2–0	(Vietnam) Becamex Bình Dương
Ricardo Lopes 41'; Lee Dong-gook 90'	Report

Jeonju World Cup Stadium, Jeonju
Attendance: 7,168
Referee: Abdulrahman Abdou (Qatar)
15 March 2016
19:30 UTC+9

FC Tokyo (Japan)	0–0	(China) Jiangsu Suning
	Report

Ajinomoto Stadium, Tokyo
Attendance: 10,265
Referee: Abdulrahman Al-Jassim (Qatar)

6 April 2016
17:00 UTC+7

Becamex Bình Dương (Vietnam)	3–2	(South Korea) Jeonbuk Hyundai Motors
Nguyễn Anh Đức 12' (pen.), 88' (pen.); Amougou 35'	Report	Lee Jong-ho 27'; Han Kyo-won 28'

Gò Đậu Stadium, Thủ Dầu Một
Attendance: 4,500
Referee: Dmitriy Mashentsev (Kyrgyzstan)
6 April 2016
20:00 UTC+8

Jiangsu Suning (China)	1–2	(Japan) FC Tokyo
Jô 34' (pen.)	Report	Morishige 30', 83'

Nanjing Olympic Sports Centre, Nanjing
Attendance: 45,065
Referee: Ben Williams (Australia)

20 April 2016
19:30 UTC+9

FC Tokyo (Japan)	0–3	(South Korea) Jeonbuk Hyundai Motors
	Report	Kim Bo-kyung 35'; Lee Jae-sung 60'; Ko Moo-yeol 90+1'

Ajinomoto Stadium, Tokyo
Attendance: 9,056
Referee: Mohanad Qasim Eesee Sarray (Iraq)
20 April 2016
20:00 UTC+8

Jiangsu Suning (China)	3–0	(Vietnam) Becamex Bình Dương
Wu Xi 6'; Jô 8'; Ji Xiang 81'	Report

Nanjing Olympic Sports Centre, Nanjing
Attendance: 33,430
Referee: Ali Sabah (Iraq)

4 May 2016
19:00 UTC+9

Jeonbuk Hyundai Motors (South Korea)	2–2	(China) Jiangsu Suning
Leonardo 19' (pen.); Lim Jong-eun 69'	Report	Teixeira 24'; Jô 54' (pen.)

Jeonju World Cup Stadium, Jeonju
Attendance: 17,312
Referee: Ahmed Al-Kaf (Oman)
4 May 2016
17:00 UTC+7

Becamex Bình Dương (Vietnam)	1–2	(Japan) FC Tokyo
Lê Công Vinh 68' (pen.)	Report	Maeda 21', 55'

Gò Đậu Stadium, Thủ Dầu Một
Attendance: 2,800
Referee: Adham Makhadmeh (Jordan)

=== Group F ===
Pos	Team	Pld	W	D	L	GF	GA	GD	Pts	Qualification	SEO	SHD	HIR	BUR
1	(South Korea) FC Seoul	6	4	1	1	17	5	+12	13	Advance to knockout stage	—	0–0	4–1	2–1
2	(China) Shandong Luneng	6	3	2	1	7	5	+2	11	Advance to knockout stage	1–4	—	1–0	3–0
3	(Japan) Sanfrecce Hiroshima	6	3	0	3	9	8	+1	9		2–1	1–2	—	3–0
4	(Thailand) Buriram United	6	0	1	5	1	16	−15	1		0–6	0–0	0–2	—

Source: AFC
Rules for classification: Group stage tiebreakers
23 February 2016
19:00 UTC+9

Sanfrecce Hiroshima (Japan)	1–2	(China) Shandong Luneng
Shimizu 64'	Report	Yang Xu 67'; Tardelli 78'

Hiroshima Big Arch, Hiroshima
Attendance: 5,809
Referee: Nawaf Shukralla (Bahrain)
23 February 2016
18:00 UTC+7

Buriram United (Thailand)	0–6	(South Korea) FC Seoul
	Report	Adriano 28', 40', 50', 60'; Damjanović 67'; Lee Seok-hyun 90'

New I-Mobile Stadium, Buriram
Attendance: 11,583
Referee: Mohammed Abdulla Hassan Mohamed (United Arab Emirates)

1 March 2016
14:00 UTC+9

FC Seoul (South Korea)	4–1	(Japan) Sanfrecce Hiroshima
Kim Won-sik 31'; Adriano 49', 56', 69'	Report	Chiba 25'

Seoul World Cup Stadium, Seoul
Attendance: 18,115
Referee: Adham Makhadmeh (Jordan)
1 March 2016
15:30 UTC+8

Shandong Luneng (China)	3–0	(Thailand) Buriram United
Tardelli 65'; Jucilei 81'; Zhao Mingjian 86'	Report

Jinan Olympic Sports Center Stadium, Jinan
Attendance: 23,976
Referee: Fahad Al-Marri (Qatar)

16 March 2016
15:30 UTC+8

Shandong Luneng (China)	1–4	(South Korea) FC Seoul
Jucilei 62'	Report	Adriano 28', 71'; Go Yo-han 65'; Damjanović 68'

Jinan Olympic Sports Center Stadium, Jinan
Attendance: 21,921
Referee: Ali Sabah (Iraq)
16 March 2016
19:00 UTC+9

Sanfrecce Hiroshima (Japan)	3–0	(Thailand) Buriram United
Asano 42', 55'; Shimizu 81'	Report

Hiroshima Big Arch, Hiroshima
Attendance: 6,411
Referee: Nawaf Shukralla (Bahrain)

5 April 2016
19:30 UTC+9

FC Seoul (South Korea)	0–0	(China) Shandong Luneng
	Report

Seoul World Cup Stadium, Seoul
Attendance: 10,147
Referee: Ravshan Irmatov (Uzbekistan)
5 April 2016
18:00 UTC+7

Buriram United (Thailand)	0–2	(Japan) Sanfrecce Hiroshima
	Report	Miyayoshi 45'; Shibasaki 88'

New I-Mobile Stadium, Buriram
Attendance: 5,532
Referee: Fahad Al-Mirdasi (Saudi Arabia)

20 April 2016
19:30 UTC+9

FC Seoul (South Korea)	2–1	(Thailand) Buriram United
Damjanović 24'; Park Yong-woo 43'	Report	Túñez 67' (pen.)

Seoul World Cup Stadium, Seoul
Attendance: 5,109
Referee: Abdulrahman Abdou (Qatar)
20 April 2016
19:30 UTC+8

Shandong Luneng (China)	1–0	(Japan) Sanfrecce Hiroshima
Tardelli 10'	Report

Jinan Olympic Sports Center Stadium, Jinan
Attendance: 24,799
Referee: Ammar Al-Jeneibi (United Arab Emirates)

4 May 2016
19:30 UTC+9

Sanfrecce Hiroshima (Japan)	2–1	(South Korea) FC Seoul
Asano 27'; Minagawa 39'	Report	Adriano 88' (pen.)

Hiroshima Big Arch, Hiroshima
Attendance: 13,328
Referee: Hettikamkanamge Perera (Sri Lanka)
4 May 2016
17:30 UTC+7

Buriram United (Thailand)	0–0	(China) Shandong Luneng
	Report

New I-Mobile Stadium, Buriram
Attendance: 3,832
Referee: Ali Abdulnabi (Bahrain)

=== Group G ===
Pos	Team	Pld	W	D	L	GF	GA	GD	Pts	Qualification	SSI	MEL	SSB	GAM
1	(China) Shanghai SIPG	6	4	0	2	10	8	+2	12	Advance to knockout stage	—	3–1	2–1	2–1
2	(Australia) Melbourne Victory	6	2	3	1	7	7	0	9 (Note: Head-to-head points: Melbourne Victory 2, Suwon Samsung Bluewings 2. Head-to-head away goal: Melbourne Victory 1, Suwon Samsung Bluewings 0)	Advance to knockout stage	2–1	—	0–0	2–1
3	(South Korea) Suwon Samsung Bluewings	6	2	3	1	7	4	+3	9		3–0	1–1	—	0–0
4	(Japan) Gamba Osaka	6	0	2	4	4	9	−5	2		0–2	1–1	1–2	—

Source: AFC
Rules for classification: Group stage tiebreakers
Notes:
24 February 2016
19:45 UTC+11

Melbourne Victory (Australia)	2–1	(China) Shanghai SIPG
Ingham 31'; Berisha 73' (pen.)	Report	Wu Lei 52'

Melbourne Rectangular Stadium, Melbourne
Attendance: 9,701
Referee: Abdulrahman Al-Jassim (Qatar)
24 February 2016
19:30 UTC+9

Suwon Samsung Bluewings (South Korea)	0–0	(Japan) Gamba Osaka
	Report

Suwon World Cup Stadium, Suwon
Attendance: 9,947
Referee: Abdulrahman Abdou (Qatar)

2 March 2016
19:00 UTC+9

Gamba Osaka (Japan)	1–1	(Australia) Melbourne Victory
Endō 57'	Report	Ansell 3'

Suita City Football Stadium, Suita
Attendance: 14,270
Referee: Ahmed Al-Kaf (Oman)
2 March 2016
19:30 UTC+8

Shanghai SIPG (China)	2–1	(South Korea) Suwon Samsung Bluewings
Elkeson 32'; Wu Lei 52'	Report	Jang Hyun-soo 72'

Shanghai Stadium, Shanghai
Attendance: 26,351
Referee: Dmitriy Mashentsev (Kyrgyzstan)

15 March 2016
19:45 UTC+11

Melbourne Victory (Australia)	0–0	(South Korea) Suwon Samsung Bluewings
	Report

Melbourne Rectangular Stadium, Melbourne
Attendance: 7,066
Referee: Muhammad Taqi (Singapore)
15 March 2016
19:30 UTC+8

Shanghai SIPG (China)	2–1	(Japan) Gamba Osaka
Elkeson 41', 62'	Report	Patric 60'

Shanghai Stadium, Shanghai
Attendance: 29,005
Referee: Mohanad Qasim Eesee Sarray (Iraq)

6 April 2016
19:00 UTC+9

Gamba Osaka (Japan)	0–2	(China) Shanghai SIPG
	Report	Wu Lei 66'; Lü Wenjun 72'

Suita City Football Stadium, Suita
Attendance: 14,756
Referee: Alireza Faghani (Iran)
6 April 2016
19:30 UTC+9

Suwon Samsung Bluewings (South Korea)	1–1	(Australia) Melbourne Victory
Kwon Chang-hoon 58'	Report	Barbarouses 60'

Suwon World Cup Stadium, Suwon
Attendance: 6,123
Referee: Adham Makhadmeh (Jordan)

19 April 2016
19:00 UTC+9

Gamba Osaka (Japan)	1–2	(South Korea) Suwon Samsung Bluewings
Konno 89'	Report	Santos 49', 57' (pen.)

Suita City Football Stadium, Suita
Attendance: 10,846
Referee: Ali Abdulnabi (Bahrain)
19 April 2016
19:30 UTC+8

Shanghai SIPG (China)	3–1	(Australia) Melbourne Victory
Yu Hai 38'; Elkeson 40'; Conca 65' (pen.)	Report	Makarounas 81'

Shanghai Stadium, Shanghai
Attendance: 32,355
Referee: Fahad Al-Marri (Qatar)

3 May 2016
20:00 UTC+10

Melbourne Victory (Australia)	2–1	(Japan) Gamba Osaka
Berisha 13' (pen.); Thompson 17'	Report	Ademilson 85'

Melbourne Rectangular Stadium, Melbourne
Attendance: 10,147
Referee: Ravshan Irmatov (Uzbekistan)
3 May 2016
19:00 UTC+9

Suwon Samsung Bluewings (South Korea)	3–0	(China) Shanghai SIPG
Kim Gun-hee 7' (pen.), 54'; Min Sang-gi 52'	Report

Suwon World Cup Stadium, Suwon
Attendance: 4,277
Referee: Ilgiz Tantashev (Uzbekistan)

=== Group H ===
Pos	Team	Pld	W	D	L	GF	GA	GD	Pts	Qualification	SYD	URA	GZE	POH
1	(Australia) Sydney FC	6	3	1	2	4	4	0	10	Advance to knockout stage	—	0–0	2–1	1–0
2	(Japan) Urawa Red Diamonds	6	2	3	1	6	4	+2	9	Advance to knockout stage	2–0	—	1–0	1–1
3	(China) Guangzhou Evergrande	6	2	2	2	6	5	+1	8		1–0	2–2	—	0–0
4	(South Korea) Pohang Steelers	6	1	2	3	2	5	−3	5		0–1	1–0	0–2	—

Source: AFC
Rules for classification: Group stage tiebreakers
24 February 2016
19:30 UTC+9

Urawa Red Diamonds (Japan)	2–0	(Australia) Sydney FC
Muto 8'; Koroki 65' (pen.)	Report

Saitama Stadium 2002, Saitama
Attendance: 19,500
Referee: Ali Sabah (Iraq)
24 February 2016
19:30 UTC+8

Guangzhou Evergrande (China)	0–0	(South Korea) Pohang Steelers
	Report

Tianhe Stadium, Guangzhou
Attendance: 571 (Note: Guangzhou Evergrande played their first group stage home match behind closed doors due to breaches of the AFC Champions League Regulations.)
Referee: Mohanad Qasim Eesee Sarray (Iraq)

2 March 2016
20:00 UTC+11

Sydney FC (Australia)	2–1	(China) Guangzhou Evergrande
Stambolziev 18'; Dimitrijević 89'	Report	Calver 25' (o.g.)

Sydney Football Stadium, Sydney
Attendance: 18,149
Referee: Alireza Faghani (Iran)
2 March 2016
19:30 UTC+9

Pohang Steelers (South Korea)	1–0	(Japan) Urawa Red Diamonds
Son Jun-ho 19' (pen.)	Report

Pohang Steel Yard, Pohang
Attendance: 7,000
Referee: Abdulrahman Abdou (Qatar)

16 March 2016
19:30 UTC+9

Pohang Steelers (South Korea)	0–1	(Australia) Sydney FC
	Report	Naumoff 41'

Pohang Steel Yard, Pohang
Attendance: 4,247
Referee: Fahad Al-Mirdasi (Saudi Arabia)
16 March 2016
19:30 UTC+8

Guangzhou Evergrande (China)	2–2	(Japan) Urawa Red Diamonds
Goulart 6' (pen.), 14'	Report	Muto 30'; Koroki 89'

Tianhe Stadium, Guangzhou
Attendance: 48,816
Referee: Mohammed Abdulla Hassan Mohamed (United Arab Emirates)

5 April 2016
20:00 UTC+10

Sydney FC (Australia)	1–0	(South Korea) Pohang Steelers
Ninković 51'	Report

Sydney Football Stadium, Sydney
Attendance: 5,642
Referee: Mohsen Torky (Iran)
5 April 2016
19:30 UTC+9

Urawa Red Diamonds (Japan)	1–0	(China) Guangzhou Evergrande
Muto 52'	Report

Saitama Stadium 2002, Saitama
Attendance: 30,282
Referee: Abdulrahman Al-Jassim (Qatar)

19 April 2016
19:30 UTC+9

Pohang Steelers (South Korea)	0–2	(China) Guangzhou Evergrande
	Report	Goulart 33'; Gao Lin 47'

Pohang Steel Yard, Pohang
Attendance: 9,274
Referee: Ilgiz Tantashev (Uzbekistan)
20 April 2016
20:00 UTC+10

Sydney FC (Australia)	0–0	(Japan) Urawa Red Diamonds
	Report

Sydney Football Stadium, Sydney
Attendance: 8,803
Referee: Muhammad Taqi (Singapore)

3 May 2016
18:30 UTC+8

Guangzhou Evergrande (China)	1–0	(Australia) Sydney FC
Gao Lin 2'	Report

Tianhe Stadium, Guangzhou
Attendance: 33,517
Referee: Nawaf Shukralla (Bahrain)
3 May 2016
19:30 UTC+9

Urawa Red Diamonds (Japan)	1–1	(South Korea) Pohang Steelers
Ljubijankić 87' (pen.)	Report	Veselinović 65' (pen.)

Saitama Stadium 2002, Saitama
Attendance: 32,409
Referee: Fahad Al-Mirdasi (Saudi Arabia)
