= 2018–19 UAE League Cup =

Arabian Gulf Cup

Tournament details
- Country: United Arab Emirates
- Dates: 4 September 2018 – 22 March 2019

Final positions
- Champions: Shabab Al Ahli (1st title)
- Runners-up: Al Wahda

Tournament statistics
- Matches played: 49
- Goals scored: 137 (2.8 per match)
- Top goal scorer: (Brazil) Caio (7 goals)
- All statistics correct as of 22 March 2019.

The 2018–19 UAE League Cup or 2018–19 Arabian Gulf Cup for sponsorship reasons, was the 11th season of the UAE League Cup.

Al Wahda were the defending champions, after defeating Al Wasl 2–1 in the finals of 2017–18 edition.

Shabab Al Ahli won their fourth UAE League Cup, first since renaming to their current name after defeating the defending champions, Al Wahda 3–1 in the finals in the extra-time.

== Group stage ==
=== Group A ===
Team	Pld	W	D	L	GF	GA	GD	Pts
Al Wahda	6	5	1	0	9	0	+9	16
Shabab Al Ahli Dubai	6	3	1	2	6	2	+4	10
Baniyas Club	6	2	3	1	8	5	+3	9
Al Wasl	6	2	2	2	6	8	−2	8
Dibba Al Fujairah	6	2	1	3	5	10	−5	7
Ajman Club	6	1	2	3	7	7	0	5
Al Ittihad Kalba	6	0	2	4	2	9	−7	2

Source: GSA
4 September 2018
18:50

Al Wasl	0–0	Al Ittihad Kalba
	Report

Zabeel Stadium, Dubai
Referee: Abdulla Ali Al Zaabi
4 September 2018
18:50

Ajman Club	1–1	Baniyas Club
Vander 86' (pen.)	Report	Leroy George 23'

Ajman Stadium, Ajman
Referee: Ahmed Hasan Al Hammadi
4 September 2018
21:30

Shabab Al Ahli	0–1	Al Wahda
	Report	Leonardo 64'

Dubai Club Stadium, Dubai
Referee: Mohammed Obaid Khadim

9 September 2018
18:40

Al Ittihad Kalba	1–4	Ajman Club
Ahmed Amir 39'	Report	Mohammed Hilal Khalifa 31', 61'; Hussain Abdulrahman 53'; Hassan Zahran 58'

Ittihad Kalba Club Stadium, Kalba
Referee: Abdulla Naji Al Harthi
9 September 2018
18:45

Baniyas Club	3–0	Dibba Al Fujairah
Leroy George 6'; Pedro Conde 41', 47'	Report

Baniyas Stadium, Abu Dhabi
Referee: Mohammed Salem Al Ali
9 September 2018
21:15

Al Wahda	3–0	Al Wasl
Leonardo 5', 44'; Yahya Ali 40'	Report

Al Nahyan Stadium, Abu Dhabi
Referee: Adel Ali Al Naqbi

9 October 2018
18:10

Ajman Club	3–0	Al Wahda
	Report	Leonardo 42'

Ajman Stadium, Ajman
Referee: Zayed Dhaif Allah Al Awlaqi
9 October 2018
18:10

Al Wasl	0–2	Shabab Al Ahli
	Report	Emiliano Vecchio 65'; Jaime Ayoví 81'

Zabeel Stadium, Dubai
Referee: Omar Mohamed Al Ali

10 October 2018
18:05

Dibba Al Fujairah	1–0	Al Ittihad Kalba
Yahya Jabrane 20' (pen.)	Report

Fujairah Club Stadium, Fujairah
Referee: Naser Ali Al Ali

14 October 2018
18:05

Al Ittihad Kalba	1–2	Baniyas Club
Mana Saeed 29'	Report	Abdulla Hassan Buashwan 39'; Pedro Conde 83'

Ittihad Kalba Club Stadium, Kalba
Referee: Mohammed Salem Al Ali
14 October 2018
18:05

Al Wahda	2–0	Dibba Al Fujairah
Mohamed Rashid 19'; Khalil Ibrahim 42'	Report

Al Nahyan Stadium, Abu Dhabi
Referee: Sultan Mohamed Al Hammadi
14 October 2018
20:45

Shabab Al Ahli Dubai	2–1	Ajman Club
Khalfan Hassan 39', 64'	Report	Stanley Ohawuchi 61'

Dubai Club Stadium, Dubai
Referee: Ahmed Salem Al Aleeli

12 November 2018
17:45

Ajman Club	0–1	Al Wasl SC
	Report	Fábio Lima 82'

Ajman Stadium, Ajman
Referee: Ahmed Hasan Al Hammadi

13 November 2018
17:45

Dibba Al Fujairah	1–0	Shabab Al Ahli
Yahya Jabran 50' (pen.)	Report

Fujairah Club Stadium, Fujairah
Referee: Fahad Abdulla Al Kassar
13 November 2018
20:30

Baniyas Club	0–0	Al Wahda
	Report

Baniyas Stadium, Abu Dhabi
Referee: Mohammed Obaid Khadim

17 November 2018
17:45

Al Wasl	4–2	Dibba Al Fujairah
Fábio Lima 10'; Vinícius Moreira 64'; Caio 78' (pen.), 81'	Report	Yahya Jabrane 42'; Driss Fettouhi 90+6'

Zabeel Stadium, Dubai
Referee: Easa Khalifa Al Hajeri
17 November 2018
17:50

Al Wahda	2–0	Al Ittihad Kalba
Myke Ramos 62' (o.g.); Mohamed Rashid 69'	Report

Al Nahyan Stadium, Abu Dhabi
Referee: Abdulla Naji Al Harthi
17 November 2018
20:30

Shabab Al Ahli	2–1	Baniyas Club
Luvannor 27', 40'	Report	Hamad Ali Al Ahbabi 45'

Dubai Club Stadium, Dubai
Referee: Ahmed Salem Al Aleeli

20 December 2018
17:45

Shabab Al Ahli	0–0	Al Ittihad Kalba
	Report

Ittihad Kalba Club Stadium, Kalba
Referee: Sultan Mohamed Al Hammadi
20 December 2018
20:30

Baniyas Club	1–1	Al Wasl
Pedro Conde 80'	Report	Ali Saleh 53'

Baniyas Stadium, Abu Dhabi
Referee: Abdulla Ali Al Zaabi
20 December 2018
20:30

Dibba Al Fujairah	1–1	Ajman Club
Juma Masud 81'	Report	Nashd Mohammed 63' (o.g.)

Fujairah Club Stadium, Fujairah Club
Referee: Yahya Ali Al Mulla

=== Group B ===
Team	Pld	W	D	L	GF	GA	GD	Pts
Al Nasr	6	5	0	1	14	6	+8	15
Al Ain	6	4	1	1	11	4	+7	13
Al Jazira	6	3	1	2	10	7	+3	10
Emirates	6	2	2	2	10	10	0	8
Al Dhafra	6	2	1	3	8	11	−3	7
Fujairah	6	2	1	3	13	18	−5	7
Sharjah	6	0	0	6	5	15	−10	0

Source: GSA
5 September 2018
18:50

Al Nasr Dubai	1–0	Emirates Club
Marquinhos Gabriel 44'	Report

Maktoum bin Rashid Al Maktoum Stadium, Dubai
Referee: Khalid Abdulla Bu Hasan
5 September 2018
18:50

Al Jazira	5–2	Fujairah
Ernest Asante 7'; Abdullah Ramadan 17'; Leonardo 39'; Salem Rashid 43'; Ahmed Rabia 57'	Report	Omar Kossoko 69'; Ahmad Moosa 76'

Mohammed bin Zayed Stadium, Abu Dhabi
Referee: Sultan Mohamed Al Hammadi
5 September 2018
21:30

Sharjah	1–4	Al Ain
Igor Coronado 80'	Report	Caio 10' (pen.), 35'; Tsukasa Shiotani 78'; Jamal Maroof 88'

Mohammed bin Zayed Stadium, Abu Dhabi
Referee: Sultan Mohamed Al Hammadi

10 September 2018
18:40

Emirates Club	1–1	Al Jazira
Johar Banihammad 3' (pen.)	Report	Khalfan Mubarak 18'

Emirates Club Stadium, Ras Al Khaimah
Referee: Ahmed Hasan Al Hammadi
10 September 2018
18:40

Fujairah	2–2	Al Dhafra
Fernando Gabriel 16' (pen.); Khalifa Abdullah 42'	Report	Suhail Salem 57'; Khaled Ba Wazir 62' (pen.)

Fujairah Club Stadium, Fujairah
Referee: Zayed Dhaif Allah Al Awlaqi
10 September 2018
21:15

Al Ain	1–2	Al Nasr
Caio 32'	Report	Iury 2'; Salem Saleh 84'

Hazza bin Zayed Stadium, Al Ain
Referee: Hamad Ali Al Ali

9 October 2018
18:20

Al Dhafra	4–2	Emirates Club
Diego 25', 86' (pen.); Amine Atouchi 45+3'; Rashed Muhayer 50'	Report	Khaled Butti 55' (o.g.); Cheick Diabaté 87'

Al Nahyan Stadium, Abu Dhabi
Referee: Sultan Mohamed Al Hammadi

10 October 2018
18:05

Al Nasr	3–0	Sharjah
Yohan Cabaye 37'; Mohamed Al-Akbari 54'; Álvaro Negredo 55'	Report

Maktoum bin Rashid Al Maktoum Stadium, Dubai
Referee: Yahya Ali Al Mulla
10 October 2018
18:10

Al Jazira	0–2	Al Ain
	Report	Caio 59'; Jamal Maroof 90+4'

Mohammed bin Zayed Stadium, Abu Dhabi
Referee: Sultan Abdulrazzaq Al Marzouqi

15 October 2018
18:05

Al Ain	1–0	Al Dhafra
Caio 27'	Report

Tahnoun bin Mohammed Stadium, Al Ain
Referee: Ahmed Eisa Darwish
15 October 2018
18:05

Sharjah	0–1	Al Jazira
	Report	Nacer Barazite 44'

Khalid bin Mohammed Stadium, Sharjah
Referee: Hamad Ali Al Ali
15 October 2018
20:45

Emirates Club	4–2	Fujairah
Saeed Salem 18', 36', 54'; Waleed Ambar 90+5'	Report	Fernando Gabriel 74' (pen.), 83'

Emirates Club Stadium, Ras Al Khaimah
Referee: Abdulla Naji Al Harthi

12 November 2018
17:45

Fujairah	1–3	Al Ain
Ahmad Moosa 86'	Report	Caio 24' (pen.), 77'; Jamal Maroof 60'

Fujairah Club Stadium, Fujairah
Referee: Yahya Ali Al Mulla
12 November 2018
20:30

Al Jazira	1–2	Al Nasr
Leonardo 60' (pen.)	Report	Masoud Sulaiman 23'; Marquinhos Gabriel 48'

Fujairah Club Stadium, Fujairah
Referee: Yahya Ali Al Mulla

13 November 2018
17:55

Al Dhafra	1–0	Sharjah
Diego 34'	Report

Al Nahyan Stadium, Abu Dhabi
Referee: Zayed Dhaif Allah Al Awlaqi

18 November 2018
17:45

Al Ain	0–0	Sharjah
	Report

Tahnoun bin Mohamed Stadium, Al Ain
Referee: Khalid Abdulla Bu Hasan
18 November 2018
17:45

Al Nasr	4–1	Al Dhafra
Mohammad Ibrahim Saleh 5'; Samuel 18'; Habib Al Fardan 57' (pen.), 85'	Report	Diego 9'

Maktoum bin Rashid Al Maktoum Stadium, Dubai
Referee: Adel Ali Al Naqbi
18 November 2018
20:30

Sharjah	2–3	Fujairah
Igor Coronado 64' (pen.); Mohamed Ibrahim 85'	Report	Mohamed Benyettou 9'; Ali Mohamed 52' (o.g.); Omar Kossoko 89'

Khalid bin Mohammed Stadium, Sharjah
Referee: Abdulla Mohamed Eshtairy

21 December 2018
20:30

Emirates Club	3–2	Sharjah
Cheick Diabaté 20', 70' (pen.), 90+4'	Report	Hamad Jasem 86'; Moatasem Yassin 90+1'

Emirates Club Stadium, Ras Al Khaimah
Referee: Mohammed Obaid Khadim
21 December 2018
20:30

Fujairah	3–2	Al Nasr
Fernando Gabriel 13', 80' (pen.); Khalifa Abdullah 46'	Report	Habib Al Fardan 15'; Jassim Yaqoob 68'

Fujairah Club Stadium, Fujairah
Referee: Ahmed Salem Al Aleeli
21 December 2018
20:30

Al Dhafra	0–2	Al Jazira
	Report	Nacer Barazite 19'; Leonardo 90+6'

Al Nahyan Stadium, Abu Dhabi
Referee: Omar Mohamed Al Ali

== Knockout stage ==
=== Quarter-finals ===
27 December 2018
17:55

Al Wahda	5–0	Emirates Club
Yahya Ali 35'; Sebastián Tagliabúe 37'; Mourad Batna 41'; Hamdan Al-Kamali 45+4'; Leonardo 78' (pen.)	Report

Al Nahyan Stadium, Abu Dhabi
Referee: Ahmed Salem Al Aleeli
27 December 2018
20:30

Shabab Al Ahli	4–2	Al Jazira
Jaime Ayoví 39', 45+1'; Ahmed Dballa Jshak 90+3', 90+6'	Report	Salmin Khamis 3' (o.g.); Nacer Barazite 69'

Maktoum bin Rashid Al Maktoum Stadium, Abu Dhabi
Referee: Sultan Abdulrazzaq Al Marzouqi

28 December 2018
17:55

Al Ain	0–1	Baniyas Club
	Report	Haboush Saleh 68'

Tahnoun bin Mohamed Stadium, Al Ain
Referee: Mohammed Abdulla Hassan
28 December 2018
20:30

Al Nasr	0–0 (a.e.t.)	Al Wasl
	Report
Penalties
Álvaro Negredo (penalty scored); Habib Al Fardan (penalty scored); Yohan Cabaye (penalty missed); Tareq Ahmed (penalty scored); Mohamed Al-Akbari (penalty scored)	4–3	(penalty scored) Caio; (penalty scored) Fábio Lima; (penalty missed) Abdulla Jassim; (penalty missed) Oh Ban-suk; (penalty scored) Yousef Ahmed

Dubai Club Stadium, Dubai
Referee: Yaqoub Yousuf Qasem

=== Semi-finals ===
8 March 2019
21:15

Al Nasr	1–1 (a.e.t.)	Shabab Al Ahli
Álvaro Negredo 118' (pen.)	Report	Emiliano Vecchio 105+4' (pen.)
Penalties
Álvaro Negredo (penalty missed); Salem Saleh (penalty scored); Dutra Júnior (penalty missed); Habib Al Fardan (penalty missed)	1–3	(penalty scored) Mauro Díaz; (penalty scored) Emiliano Vecchio; (penalty scored) Jaime Ayoví

Al Maktoum Stadium, Dubai
Referee: Sultan Abdulrazzaq Al Marzouqi

15 March 2019
21:15

Al Wahda	4–1	Baniyas Club
Khalil Ibrahim 2'; Sebastián Tagliabúe 59', 88'; Leonardo 83'	Report	Pedro Conde 13'

Al Nahyan Stadium, Abu Dhabi
Referee: Mohammed Abdulla Hassan

=== Finals ===
22 March 2019
21:15

Al Wahda	1–3 (a.e.t.)	Shabab Al Ahli
Sebastián Tagliabúe 45'	Report	Luvannor 40'; Jaime Ayoví 96', 107'

Hazza bin Zayed Stadium, Al Ain
Referee: Ahmed Eisa Darwish

== Statistics ==
=== Top goalscorers ===
Rank	Player	Team	Goals
1	(Brazil) Caio	Al Ain	7
2	(Brazil) Leonardo	Al Wahda	6
3	(Spain) Pedro Conde	Baniyas Club	5
3	(Brazil) Fernando Gabriel	Fujairah	5
3	(Ecuador) Jaime Ayoví	Shabab Al Ahli	5
6	(Mali) Cheick Diabaté	Emirates Club	4
6	(Brazil) Leonardo da Silva Souza	Al Dhafra	4
6	(Argentina) Sebastián Tagliabúe	Al Wahda	4
