= 2017–18 UAE League Cup =

2017–18 League Cup
Tournament details
- Country: United Arab Emirates
- Teams: 12

Final positions
- Champions: Al Wahda (2nd title)
- Runners-up: Al Wasl

Tournament statistics
- Matches played: 43
- Goals scored: 145 (3.37 per match)
- Top goal scorer: (Argentina) Sebastián Tagliabúe (14 goals)
- All statistics correct as of 19:57, 29 December 2017 (UTC).

The 2017–18 UAE League Cup is the tenth season of the UAE League Cup. The competition started on September 4, 2017.

== Group stage ==
=== Group A ===
| Team | Pld | W | D | L | GF | GA | GD | Pts |
|---|---|---|---|---|---|---|---|---|
| Al Jazira | 5 | 3 | 1 | 1 | 8 | 4 | +4 | 10 |
| Al Nasr | 5 | 3 | 1 | 1 | 8 | 3 | +5 | 10 |
| Al Ain | 5 | 2 | 1 | 2 | 13 | 10 | +3 | 7 |
| Hatta | 5 | 1 | 3 | 1 | 5 | 5 | 0 | 6 |
| Ajman | 5 | 1 | 1 | 3 | 5 | 8 | −3 | 4 |
| Al Dhafra | 5 | 1 | 1 | 3 | 5 | 14 | −9 | 4 |

Source: Soccerway

=== Group B ===
| Team | Pld | W | D | L | GF | GA | GD | Pts |
|---|---|---|---|---|---|---|---|---|
| Shabab Al Ahli Dubai | 5 | 2 | 3 | 0 | 13 | 7 | +6 | 9 |
| Al Wahda | 5 | 2 | 2 | 1 | 10 | 6 | +4 | 8 |
| Al Wasl | 5 | 2 | 1 | 2 | 12 | 11 | +1 | 7 |
| Dibba | 5 | 2 | 1 | 2 | 7 | 9 | −2 | 7 |
| Sharjah | 5 | 1 | 2 | 2 | 9 | 11 | −2 | 5 |
| Emirates | 5 | 1 | 1 | 3 | 4 | 11 | −7 | 4 |

Updated to match(es) played on 26 December 2017. Source: http://uae.agleague.ae/en/stats/the-arabian-gulf-cup.html
Rules for classification: 1) points; 2) head-to-head points; 3) head-to-head goal difference; 4) head-to-head goals scored; 5) head-to-head away goals scored; 6) goal difference; 7) number of goals scored; 8) number of away goals scored; 9) fair play ranking 10) draw

=== Group matches ===
All times are local (UTC+04:00).

==== Group A ====
| 4 September 2017 WEEK 1 | Al Ain | 2–2 | Hatta | Al Ain |
| 17:25 | Yousef Ahmed 40'; Caio 53' (pen.) | Report | Mahir Jasem 5'; Fernando Gabriel 25' | Stadium: Sheikh Khalifa International Stadium; Referee: Yahya Mohammed Ali Hassan Al Mulla |

| 8 September 2017 WEEK 1 | Al Dhafra | 1–1 | Al Jazira | Madinat Zayed |
| 15:50 | Abdul-Raheem 82' | Report | Romarinho 48' | Stadium: Al Dhafra Stadium; Referee: Sultan Mohamed Saleh; Assistant referees: Ahmed Alrashdi, Mohammed Ali Helal; Fourth official: Khalid Almula |

| 9 September 2017 WEEK 1 | Al Nasr | 3–0 | Ajman | Dubai |
| 18:30 | Yaqoub 42'; Wanderley 57'; Marcelo Cirino 64' | Report | | Stadium: Zabeel Stadium; Referee: Fahad Al-Kassar; Assistant referees: Mohammed Ahmed Yousef, Ahmed Alabdouli; Fourth official: Zayed Alawlaqi |

| 6 October 2017 WEEK 2 | Hatta | 0–0 | Al Nasr | Hatta |
| 17:15 | | Report | | Stadium: Hamdan Bin Rashid Stadium |

| 6 October 2017 WEEK 2 | Al Jazira | 2–1 | Al Ain | Abu Dhabi |
| 20:00 | Al Ghilani 44'; Al-Eidi 68' | Report | Caio 51' (pen.) | Stadium: Mohammed Bin Zayed Stadium |

| 7 October 2017 WEEK 2 | Ajman | 3–1 | Al Dhafra | Ajman |
| 17:15 | Adeílson 66'; Waleed 90'; Kone 90+7' | Report | Al-Hammadi 90+6' | Stadium: Ajman Stadium |

| 10 November 2017 WEEK 3 | Hatta | 0–0 | Ajman | Hatta |
| 16:45 | | Report | | Stadium: Hamdan Bin Rashid Stadium |

| 10 November 2017 WEEK 3 | Al Nasr | 0–3 | Al Jazira | Dubai |
| 19:30 | | Report | Mabkhout 20'; Rashidov 25'; Al Ghilani 65' | Stadium: Zabeel Stadium |

| 11 November 2017 WEEK 3 | Al Ain | 7–1 | Al Dhafra | Al-Ain |
| 16:50 | Douglas 26', 31', 45', 57'; Caio 35', 69'; Yousef Ahmed 90' | Report | Abdulqader 86' | Stadium: Hazza Bin Zayed Stadium |

| 14 December 2017 WEEK 4 | Ajman | 2–3 | Al Ain | Ajman |
| 16:45 | Kone 52'; Abdulrahman 64' | Report | Diaky 28'; Douglas 77'; Abdullah 84' | Stadium: Ajman Stadium |

| 15 December 2017 WEEK 4 | Al Dhafra | 0–2 | Al-Nasr | Madinat Zayed |
| 16:50 | | Report | Marcelo Cirino 40'; Wanderley 90' | Stadium: Al Dhafra Stadium |

| 21 December 2017 WEEK 5 | Hatta | 1–2 | Al Dhafra | Hatta |
| 16:50 | Samuel Rosa 19' | Report | Al-Kathiri 34', 75' | Stadium: Hamdan Bin Rashid Stadium |

| 21 December 2017 WEEK 5 | Ajman | 0–1 | Al Jazira | Ajman |
| 16:55 | | Report | Al Ghilani 55' | Stadium: Ajman Stadium |

| 21 December 2017 WEEK 5 | Al Nasr | 3–0 | Al Ain | Dubai |
| 19:45 | Marcelo Cirino 2'; Saleh 17', 62' | Report | | Stadium: Zabeel Stadium |

| 26 December 2017 WEEK 3 | Al Jazira | 1–2 | Hatta | Abu Dhabi |
| 13:55 | Sardor Rashidov 90' | Report | S. Rosa 27'; Ali Al-Khajah 90+6' | Stadium: Mohammed bin Zayed Stadium |

==== Group B ====
| 8 September 2017 WEEK 1 | Al-Wasl | 3–2 | Dibba | Dubai |
| 15:40 | Hassan Mohammed 2'; Caio 70' (pen.); Fábio Lima 88' | Report | Ciel 48' (pen.), 53' | Stadium: Zabeel Stadium; Referee: Omar Mohamed Al Ali; Assistant referees: Sabet Obaid, Masoud Hassan; Fourth official: Mohammed Salem Yousef |

| 8 September 2017 WEEK 1 | Al Wahda | 1–1 | Shabab Al-Ahli Dubai | Abu Dhabi |
| 18:30 | Tagliabué 10' | Report | Diop 45+3' | Stadium: Al Nahyan Stadium; Referee: Yaqoub Al Hammadi; Assistant referees: Jasem Abdulla, Khamis Fairooz; Fourth official: Saqr Alzaabi |

| 9 September 2017 WEEK 1 | Sharjah | 0–2 | Emirates | Sharjah |
| 15:40 | | Report | Mouaoui 61'; Sáez 80' | Stadium: Sharjah Stadium; Referee: Mohomed Obaid Khadim; Assistant referees: Hasan Almahri, Talal Rashid Al Nuaimi; Fourth official: Mohammed Alshbebi |

| 6 October 2017 WEEK 2 | Emirates | 0–4 | Al-Wasl | Ras Al-Khaimah |
| 17:15 | | Report | Caio 14'; Fábio Lima 46'; Caio 65'; Ronaldo Mendes 84' | Stadium: Emirates Club Stadium |

| 7 October 2017 WEEK 2 | Dibba | 2–1 | Al Wahda | Fujairah |
| 17:15 | A. Diallo 24', 78' | Report | Mohamed Al-Shehhi 48' | Stadium: Fujairah Club Stadium; Referee: Fahad Al-Kassar |

| 7 October 2017 WEEK 2 | Shabab Al-Ahli Dubai | 3–3 | Sharjah | Dubai |
| 20:00 | Luvannor 23'; Marzooq 36'; Diop 86' (pen.) | Report | Al Zari 45', 50'; Welliton 62' | Stadium: Rashid Stadium; Referee: Adel Ali Al Naqbi |

| 10 November 2017 WEEK 3 | Emirates | 0–0 | Dibba | Ras Al-Khaimah |
| 16:45 | | Report | | Stadium: Emirates Club Stadium |

| 11 November 2017 WEEK 3 | Sharjah | 1–1 | Al Wahda | Sharjah |
| 16:50 | Jamal Maroof 30' | Report | Tagliabúe 86' | Stadium: Khalid Bin Mohammed Stadium; Referee: Easa Khalifa Al Hajeri |

| 11 November 2017 WEEK 3 | Al Wasl | 2–2 | Shabab Al Ahli-Dubai | Dubai |
| 19:30 | Caio 45+1' (pen.); Saleh Abdulla 75' | Report | Moon Chang-jin 69'; Diop 89' | Stadium: Zabeel Stadium; Referee: Hamad Ali Al Ali |

| 14 December 2017 WEEK 4 | Dibba | 2–1 | Sharjah | Fujairah |
| 16:40 | | Report | | Stadium: Fujairah Club Stadium |

| 14 December 2017 WEEK 4 | Al Wahda | 3–0 | Al Wasl | Abu Dhabi |
| 19:30 | | Report | | Stadium: Al Nahyan Stadium |

| 15 December 2017 WEEK 4 | Shabab Al Ahli-Dubai | 3–0 | Emirates | Dubai |
| 19:30 | | Report | | Stadium: Rashid Stadium |

| 22 December 2017 WEEK 5 | Dibba | 1–4 | Shabab Al Ahli-Dubai | Fujairah |
| 16:50 | | Report | | Stadium: Fujairah Club Stadium |

| 22 December 2017 WEEK 5 | Emirates | 2–4 | Al Wahda | Ras Al-Khaimah |
| 16:50 | | Report | | Stadium: Emirates Club Stadium |

| 22 December 2017 WEEK 5 | Al Wasl | 3–4 | Sharjah | Dubai |
| 19:45 | | Report | | Stadium: Zabeel Stadium |

== Knockout phase ==
The knockout phase involves the first four teams of each of the 2 groups in the group stage.

Each tie in the knockout phase, apart from the final, is played over two legs, with each team playing one leg at home. The team that scores more goals on aggregate over the two legs advance to the next round. If the aggregate score is level, the away goals rule is applied, i.e. the team that scored more goals away from home over the two legs advances. If away goals are also equal, then thirty minutes of extra time is played. The away goals rule is again applied after extra time, i.e. if there are goals scored during extra time and the aggregate score is still level, the visiting team advances by virtue of more away goals scored. If no goals are scored during extra time, the tie is decided by penalty shoot-out. In the final, which is played as a single match, if scores are level at the end of normal time, extra time is played, followed by penalty shoot-out if scores remain tied.

Quarter-finals
Al Jazira | 1 | 0 | 1
Dibba | 3 | 1 | 4
Al Ain | 1 | 1 | 2
Al Wahda | 2 | 5 | 7
Al Nasr | 2 | 0 | 2
Al Wasl | 2 | 1 | 3
Hatta | 0 | 1 | 1
Shabab Al Ahli Dubai | 3 | 2 | 5

Semi-finals
Dibba | 2 | 3 | 5
Al Wahda | 4 | 4 | 8
Al Wasl | 0 | 3 | 3
Shabab Al Ahli Dubai | 0 | 2 | 2

Final
Al Wahda | 2
Al Wasl | 1

== Quarter-finals ==
The first legs was played on 29 and 30 December 2017, and the second legs will be played on 15 and 16 February 2018.

=== First leg ===
29 December 2017
17:15

| Al Ain | 1–2 | Al Wahda |
|---|---|---|
| Berg 84' (pen.) | Report | Tagliabué 70'; Al-Akbari 87' |

Hazza bin Zayed Stadium
Referee: Sultan Abdurazzaq

29 December 2017
20:00

| Al Wasl | 2–2 | Al Nasr |
|---|---|---|
| Lima 18', 34' | Report | Y. Al Zaabi 47' (o.g.); Salem Saleh 53' |

Zabeel Stadium
Referee: Adel Al Naqbi

30 December 2017
17:10

| Dibba | 3–1 | Al Jazira |
|---|---|---|
| Ahmed Rashed 49', 60'; Driss Fettouhi 82' | Report | Romarinho 84' |

Fujairah Club Stadium
Referee: Hamad Ali Yousef

30 December 2017
20:00

| Shabab Al Ahli Dubai | 3–0 | Hatta |
|---|---|---|
| H. Luvannor 26'; Walid Amber 66'; Saoud Abdurazaq 76' | Report |

Shabab Al Ahli Dubai Stadium Al Aweer
Referee: Ahmed Salim Khalfan

=== Second leg ===
15 February 2018
17:30

| Hatta | 1–2 | Shabab Al Ahli Dubai |
|---|---|---|
| A. Khamis 53' | | Diop 50'; Erceg 83' |

Hamdan Bin Rashid Stadium

15 February 2018
20:00

| Al Jazira | 0–1 | Dibba |
|---|---|---|
| | Report | Al-Bakhit 7' |

Mohammad Bin Zayed Stadium

16 February 2018
17:30

| Al Nasr | 0–1 | Al Wasl |
|---|---|---|
| | Report | Caio 48' |

Shabab Al Ahli Dubai Stadium Al Aweer

16 February 2018
20:00

| Al Wahda | 5–1 | Al Ain |
|---|---|---|
| Batna 9'; Ahmed 41'; Tagliabué 62'; Al Shehhi 78'; Al Akbari 79' | Report | Khalil 31' |

Al Nahyan Stadium

== Semi-finals ==
The semi-finals will be played on 9 and 22 March 2018.

=== First leg ===
9 March 2018

| Al Wahda | 4–2 | Dibba |
|---|---|---|
| Tagliabúe 3', 63' (pen.), 81'; Dzsudzsák 72' (pen.) | Report | Diogo 66', 87' |

Zayed Sports City Stadium
Referee: Yahya Ali Al Mulla
9 March 2018

| Shabab Al Ahli Dubai | 0–0 | Al Wasl |
|---|---|---|
| | Report |

Al Rashid Stadium
Referee: Omar Mohamed Al Ali

=== Second leg ===
22 March 2018

| Dibba | 3–4 | Al Wahda |
|---|---|---|
| Rodolfo 1', 4'; Ali 49' | Report | Tagliabúe 18', 90', 90+4'; Batna 33' |

Fujairah Club Stadium
Referee: Adel Ali Al Naqbi
22 March 2018

| Al Wasl | 3–2 | Shabab Al Ahli Dubai |
|---|---|---|
| Saleh 15'; Abbas 87'; Caio 90+1' | Report | Al Hammadi 16'; Ambar 72' |

Zabeel Stadium
Referee: Hamad Ali Al Ali

== Final ==
The final will be played on 29 March 2018.

29 March 2018
21:30

| Al Wahda | 2–1 | Al-Wasl |
|---|---|---|
| Ahmed 14'; Tagliabúe 29' | Report | Mendes 61' |

Al Rashid Stadium
Referee: Ammar Ali Al Junaibi

== Goalscorers ==
There have been 22 goals scored in 8 matches, for an average of 2.75 goals per match.

6 goals

- (Argentina) Sebastián Tagliabué (Al Wahda)
- (Brazil) Caio (Al-Wasl)

5 goals

- (Brazil) Douglas (Al Ain)
- (Brazil) Welliton (Al-Sharjah)

4 goals

- (Brazil) Caio (Al Ain)

3 goals

- (Argentina) Sebastián Sáez (Emirates)
- (Brazil) Marcelo Cirino (Al-Nasr Dubai)
- (Moldova) Henrique Luvannor (Shabab Al-Ahli Dubai)
- (Senegal) Makhete Diop (Shabab Al-Ahli Dubai)
- (United Arab Emirates) Ahmed Al Ghilani (Al Jazira)
- (United Arab Emirates) Mohamed Al-Akbari (Al Wahda)

2 goals

- (Brazil) Ronaldo Mendes (Al-Wasl)
- (Brazil) Ciel (Dibba Al-Fujairah)
- (Brazil) Wanderley (Al-Nasr Dubai)
- (Brazil) Samuel Rosa Gonçalves (Hatta)
- (Brazil) Fábio Virginio de Lima (Al-Wasl)
- (Senegal) Alassane Diallo (Dibba Al-Fujairah)
- (South Korea) Moon Chang-jin (Shabab Al-Ahli Dubai)
- (United Arab Emirates) Hassan Mohammed (Al-Wasl)
- (United Arab Emirates) Ahmed Rashed Ali (Dibba Al-Fujairah)
- (United Arab Emirates) Yousef Ahmed (Al Ain)
- (United Arab Emirates) Saeed Al-Kathiri (Al Dhafra)
- (United Arab Emirates) Salem Saleh (Al-Nasr Dubai
- (United Arab Emirates) Khalid Rashid Alzari (Al-Sharjah)
- (Uzbekistan) Sardor Rashidov (Al Jazira)
- (United Arab Emirates) Tareq Ahmed (Al Wahda)

1 goal

- (Brazil) Romarinho (Al Jazira)
- (Iraq) Mohannad Abdul-Raheem (Al Dhafra)
- (Morocco) Abdelghani Mouaoui (Emirates)
- (Senegal) Makhete Diop (Shabab Al-Ahli Dubai)
- (United Arab Emirates) Mohsen Abdullah (Al Ain)
- (United Arab Emirates) Mahir Jasem (Hatta)
- (United Arab Emirates) Jassem Yaqoub (Al-Nasr Dubai)
- (United Arab Emirates) Abdullah Abdulqader (Al Dhafra)
- (United Arab Emirates) Hussain Abdulrahman (Ajman Club)
- (United Arab Emirates) Mohammed Abdulbasit (Al Wahda)
- (United Arab Emirates) Ahmed Khalil (Al Ain)
- (Morocco) Mourad Batna (Al Wahda)
