= Bur Dubai derby =

Bur Dubai Derby
- Location: Bur Dubai, Dubai, United Arab Emirates
- Teams: Al Nasr, Al Wasl
- Latest meeting: Al Wasl 1–0 Al Nasr (21 February 2025)
- Next meeting: Al Nasr vs Al Wasl (17 October 2025); UAE Pro League

Statistics
- Total meetings: 110
- Most wins: Al Nasr (39)
- Largest victory: Al Wasl 6–1 Al Nasr (14 December 2000) Al Nasr 6–1 Al Wasl (4 December 2013)

Bur Dubai Derby is the Derby between Emirati football teams Al Nasr and Al Wasl, both clubs have been competitors in the UAE Pro-League and the UAE President's Cup, it is usually held twice a year but the teams face each other in other competitions from time to time, both clubs compete on who is the best club in Bur Dubai.

== Statistics ==
As of 14 February 2021

=== Results ===
==== League ====
===== Football League era =====
Season	Date	Home team	Score	Away team
1998–99	3 December 1998	Al Nasr	2–1	Al Wasl
1998–99	21 February 1999	Al Wasl	2–2	Al Nasr
1999–2000	13 January 2000	Al Nasr	1–1	Al Wasl
1999–2000	12 April 2000	Al Wasl	0–1	Al Nasr
2000–01	14 December 2000	Al Wasl	6–1	Al Nasr
2000–01	4 March 2001	Al Nasr	2–0	Al Wasl
2001–02	16 February 2002	Al Wasl	0–1	Al Nasr
2001–02	8 May 2002	Al Nasr	1–2	Al Wasl
2002–03	11 December 2002	Al Wasl	1–1	Al Nasr
2002–03	17 February 2003	Al Nasr	0–0	Al Wasl
2004–05	30 December 2004	Al Wasl	0–1	Al Nasr
2004–05	1 April 2005	Al Nasr	2–1	Al Wasl
2005–06	26 November 2005	Al Wasl	3–1	Al Nasr
2005–06	21 April 2006	Al Nasr	0–2	Al Wasl
2006–07	21 September 2006	Al Nasr	1–1	Al Wasl
2006–07	2 March 2007	Al Wasl	1–0	Al Nasr
2007–08	9 December 2007	Al Wasl	1–1	Al Nasr
2007–08	4 April 2008	Al Nasr	1–1	Al Wasl

===== Pro League era =====
Season	Date	Home team	Score	Away team
2008–09	6 February 2009	Al Wasl	1–0	Al Nasr
2008–09	4 April 2009	Al Nasr	2–2	Al Wasl
2009–10	30 October 2009	Al Nasr	3–1	Al Wasl
2009–10	13 March 2010	Al Wasl	0–0	Al Nasr
2010–11	19 December 2010	Al Wasl	2–3	Al Nasr
2010–11	1 June 2011	Al Nasr	1–0	Al Wasl
2011–12	23 December 2011	Al Wasl	2–2	Al Nasr
2011–12	26 April 2012	Al Nasr	1–1	Al Wasl
2012–13	29 September 2012	Al Nasr	2–2	Al Wasl
2012–13	26 January 2013	Al Wasl	0–1	Al Nasr
2013–14	4 December 2013	Al Nasr	6–1	Al Wasl
2013–14	5 April 2014	Al Wasl	1–2	Al Nasr
2014–15	30 September 2014	Al Nasr	0–0	Al Wasl
2014–15	20 February 2015	Al Wasl	2–2	Al Nasr
2015–16	21 September 2015	Al Nasr	2–0	Al Wasl
2015–16	28 January 2016	Al Wasl	3–2	Al Nasr
2016–17	14 October 2016	Al Wasl	2–1	Al Nasr
2016–17	27 January 2017	Al Nasr	1–2	Al Wasl
2017–18	2 November 2017	Al Nasr	0–2	Al Wasl
2017–18	28 February 2018	Al Wasl	1–2	Al Nasr
2018–19	19 October 2018	Al Wasl	1–3	Al Nasr
2018–19	3 April 2019	Al Nasr	4–2	Al Wasl
2019–20	20 September 2019	Al Nasr	0–0	Al Wasl
2019–20	28 January 2020	Al Wasl	0–0	Al Nasr
2020–21	29 October 2020	Al Wasl	0–3	Al Nasr
2020–21	14 February 2021	Al Nasr	0–1	Al Wasl
2021–22	2 November 2021	Al Wasl	1–2	Al Nasr
2021–22	5 May 2022	Al Nasr	3–2	Al Wasl
2022–23	1 October 2022	Al Nasr	1–2	Al Wasl
2022–23	17 February 2023	Al Wasl	2–0	Al Nasr
2023–24	13 February 2024	Al Wasl	1–0	Al Nasr
2023–24	2 June 2024	Al Nasr	0–2	Al Wasl
2024–25	21 September 2024	Al Nasr	1_3	Al Wasl

President's Cup

Season	Date	Home team	Score	Away team
2023–24	17 May 2024	Al Wasl	4–0	Al Nasr

===== League Cup =====
Season	Date	Home team	Score	Away team
2009–10	9 October 2009	Al Wasl	2–2	Al Nasr
2009–10	5 January 2010	Al Nasr	2–2	Al Wasl
2013–14	3 March 2014	Al Wasl	2–3	Al Nasr
2014–15	5 January 2015	Al Nasr	0–0	Al Wasl
2015–16	4 September 2015	Al Nasr	0–0	Al Wasl
2017–18	29 December 2017	Al Wasl	2–2	Al Nasr
2017–18	16 February 2018	Al Nasr	0–1	Al Wasl
2018–19	28 December 2018	Al Nasr	0–0 (p) (4–3)	Al Wasl
2021–22	25 March 2022	Al Wasl	1–0	Al Nasr

=== Head to head ===
Competition	Total	Al Nasr wins	Draws	Al Wasl wins
League	97	35	30	38
President's Cup	4	2	0	2
League Cup	9	1	6	2
Super Cup	1	1	0	0
Total	111	39	35	42

== Honours ==
Based on United Arab Emirates football records

Al Nasr	Competition	Al Wasl
Domestic
3	Pro League	8
4	President's Cup	3
6	League Cup/Federation Cup	1
2	Super Cup	—
3	Joint League Cup	—
18	Total	12
MENA
1	GCC Champions League	1
1	Super cup Qatar_UAE	0
0	Super Shield Qatar_UAE	1
20	Grand total	14
