= Khalil Ibrahim (footballer) =

Emirati footballer (born 1993)

Personal information
- Full name: Khalil Ibrahim Ali Abdulla Al-Hammadi
- Date of birth: 4 May 1993 (age 33)
- Place of birth: Abu Dhabi, United Arab Emirates
- Height: 1.82 m (6 ft 0 in)
- Position: Winger

Team information
- Current team: Al-Dhafra
- Number: 10

Youth career
- 2005–2009: Al-Dhafra
- 2009–2014: Al Wahda

Senior career*
| Years | Team | Apps | (Gls) |
| 2014–2023 | Al Wahda | 109 | (9) |
| 2023 | Baniyas | 7 | (0) |
| 2023– | Al-Dhafra | 0 | (0) |

International career^{‡}
| 2019– | United Arab Emirates | 10 | (5) |
- * Club domestic league appearances and goals ‡ National team caps and goals as of 24 May 2021

Khalil Ibrahim Ali Abdulla Al-Hammadi (Arabic: خليل إبراهيم علي عبد الله الحمادي; born 4 May 1993) is an Emirati footballer who plays for Al-Dhafra as a winger.

== Career statistic ==
=== Club ===
As of match played on 26 August 2021

| Team | Season | League | | | National Cup | | League Cup | | Continental^{1} | | Total | |
| Team | Season | Division | Apps | Goals | Apps | Goals | Apps | Goals | Apps | Goals | Apps | Goals |
|---|---|---|---|---|---|---|---|---|---|---|---|---|
| Al Wahda | 2014–15 | UAE Pro-League | 0 | 0 | — | | — | | — | | 0 | 0 |
| Al Wahda | 2015–16 | UAE Pro-League | 15 | 0 | — | | 5 | 0 | — | | 20 | 0 |
| Al Wahda | 2016–17 | UAE Pro-League | 17 | 2 | 4 | 0 | 6 | 2 | — | | 27 | 4 |
| Al Wahda | 2017–18 | UAE Pro-League | 2 | 0 | 0 | 0 | 1 | 0 | 5 | 1 | 8 | 1 |
| Al Wahda | 2018–19 | UAE Pro-League | 13 | 1 | 1 | 0 | 4 | 2 | 4 | 0 | 22 | 3 |
| Al Wahda | 2019–20 | UAE Pro-League | 17 | 2 | 0 | 0 | 1 | 0 | 8 | 1 | 26 | 3 |
| Al Wahda | 2020–21 | UAE Pro-League | 21 | 2 | 0 | 0 | 0 | 0 | 7 | 2 | 27 | 4 |
| Al Wahda | 2021–22 | UAE Pro-League | 2 | 0 | 0 | 0 | 0 | 0 | 0 | 0 | 2 | 0 |
| Total | | | 88 | 7 | 5 | 0 | 17 | 4 | 24 | 4 | 123 | 15 |
| Career total | | | 88 | 7 | 5 | 0 | 17 | 4 | 17 | 2 | 123 | 15 |

^{1}Continental competitions include the AFC Champions League.

=== International goals ===
Scores and results list the United Arab Emirates' goal tally first.

| No. | Date | Venue | Opponent | Score | Result | Competition |
|---|---|---|---|---|---|---|
| 1. | 30 August 2019 | Bahrain National Stadium, Riffa, Bahrain | Dominican Republic | 2–0 | 4–0 | Friendly |
| 2. | 30 August 2019 | Bahrain National Stadium, Riffa, Bahrain | Dominican Republic | 3–0 | 4–0 | Friendly |
| 3. | 10 October 2019 | Al Maktoum Stadium, Dubai, United Arab Emirates | Indonesia | 1–0 | 5–0 | 2022 FIFA World Cup qualification |
| 4. | 29 March 2021 | Zabeel Stadium, Dubai, United Arab Emirates | India | 4–0 | 6–0 | Friendly |
| 5. | 24 May 2021 | Rashid Stadium, Dubai, United Arab Emirates | Jordan | 3–0 | 5–1 | Friendly |
| 6. | 3 December 2021 | Stadium 974, Doha, Qatar | Mauritania | 1–0 | 1–0 | 2021 FIFA Arab Cup |

== Honours ==
Al Wahda

- UAE President's Cup: 2016–17
- UAE League Cup: 2017–18
