= Ismail Matar =

Emirati footballer (born 1983)

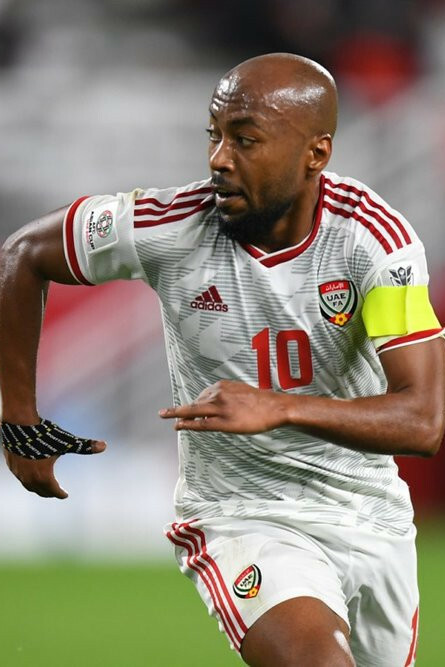
- Matar in 2019

Personal information
- Full name: Ismail Matar Ibrahim Khamis Al Mukhaini Al Junaibi
- Date of birth: 7 April 1983 (age 43)
- Place of birth: Abu Dhabi, United Arab Emirates
- Height: 1.68 m (5 ft 6 in)
- Position: Striker

Youth career
- 1997–2001: Al-Wahda

Senior career*
| Years | Team | Apps | (Gls) |
| 2001–2024 | Al-Wahda | 418 | (101) |
| 2009 | → Al Sadd (loan) | 0 | (3) |

International career
| 2003 | United Arab Emirates U-20 | 5 | (2) |
| 2003–2006 | United Arab Emirates U-23 | 20 | (6) |
| 2012 | United Arab Emirates Olympic (O.P.) | 3 | (2) |
| 2003–2021 | United Arab Emirates | 136 | (36) |
- * Club domestic league appearances and goals

Ismail Matar Al-Junaibi (Arabic: إِسْمَاعِيلُ مَطَرُ إِبْرَاهِيمُ خَمِيسُ الْمُخَيْنِيُّ الْجُنَيْبِيُّ; born 7 April 1983 in Abu Dhabi) is an Emirati former footballer who played as an attacking midfielder or forward.

Matar was awarded the Golden Ball at the 2003 World Youth Championships after being voted the tournament's best player even though the UAE only reached the quarter finals. He is best known for leading the UAE to their first ever trophy, which was held in Abu Dhabi in 2007. Matar scored 5 goals in 5 games, and was named player of the tournament and the top scorer.

== Club career ==
=== Al Wahda ===
==== 2002–03 ====
The first game was in the season against Al-Jazira, which he also scored his first in the match. This goal was the equalizer for Al-Wahda in the second half, but the joy did not last, Al-Jazira made the second goal and the winning goal latter. Matar continued his brilliant presence in that season and scored 14 goals, as he was named the Best Emarati Young Player in the UAE League and led Al-Wahda to the UAE Pro-League and the President's Cup titles. He was the only player in that season that has been scored in the Goal of Muhsin Musabah five goals including two goals in the first round and two in the second round and a goal in the cup final from penalty shot out.

==== 2003–04 ====
The Golden Boy did not shine strongly because of his involvement with the national team and the UAE Olympic and UAE Under-20, and he is the only Emirati player who participated in four games with the Al-Wahda and the national team and UAE Under-20 and UAE Olympic and distributed his effort in the four teams, which could not shine with Al-Wahda and he scored three goals with Al-Wahda, the club was ranked sixth in the league, and began the fatigue and exhaustion on Ismail making the press pounce on the United Arab Emirates Football Association to merciless the player from involved with the four national teams. But his effort did not go waste with the UAE Under-20, who was playing in the FIFA World Youth Championship 2003 in the UAE, but he achieved with the UAE Under-20 eighth place, and was the best player in the tournament, which was nominated for the best player and has achieved what he wanted. And has many offers from European clubs including the Chelsea reserve and Inter Milan and Asian Clubs including Japan clubs and Qatari Club Al-Sadd.

==== 2004–05 ====
Ismail was shown a good form for Al-Wahda at 2004–05 season and scored 11 goals including doubles against Al-Nasr, Al Jazira and Al-Shabab and a winning goal against Al Ain. He was most prominent in the ranks of Al-Wahda players, help the club to win the league title and finished as runners-up in the Domestic Cup. Al-Wahda had the strongest line of attack in that season, and Matar was playmaker of heavy caliber, which he was nominated for the Best Emarati Player. Ismail was more vigor and vitality and strength and fitness and determination to win and was serious player at the same time at the season. In match against Sharjah in the quarter-finals of the President's Cup, he scored hat-trick with the club and ascended to the semi-final.

=== Al-Sadd Club (loan) ===
On 6 May 2009, Al-Wahda announced that Ismail had been moved to Qatari club Al-Sadd on loan until the end of the season to participate with the club in the Emir Cup. Commenting on his move, Matar said:

"The professional experience in Al-Sadd club will be useful to me on both, a technical and moral level. I am now 26-years old and it is difficult for professionalism in Europe, and I hope to be lucky with Al-Sadd in my short tenure."

Ismail took part in the Emir Cup quarter-final, coming on as a substitute for Hassan Al Haidos after 22 minutes. At the time of coming on, Al Ahli were leading two goals to none, and Al Sadd were a player down after Ibrahim Majid got sent off after 13 minutes. Ismail played a great match, scoring Al-Sadd's third goal in extra time, as well as creating the other two goals. He scored a penalty in the penalty shootout, which Al Sadd won 4–2 to ensure a place in the semi-finals. He was named the Man of the Match, in addition to being immediately awarded two thousand dollars by the Qatar Football Association.

=== Return to Al Wahda ===
==== 2009–10 ====
On 11 June 2009, rumors spread that Al-Wahda has received an offer of amount 50 million dirham from the arch-rivals Al Ain, and offers from other Arabic clubs specifically from Saudi clubs Al-Hilal and Al-Ittihad for Ismail, but Al-Wahda denied the rumors and extended Ismail's contract until 2014. To be the seventh player to extend his contract for five years, in an interview with club's website, Ismail has said that he had received offers from Saudi clubs and has offers from other clubs too but he rejected all because he loves the club that help him to improve.

On 28 September 2009, during Al-Wahda's 3–1 win against Al-Ahli, Ismail assisted Fernando Baiano. On 4 October 2009, Al-Wahda defeated Ajman 5–1 which Ismail scored one goal and assisted Fernando Baiano again. On 10 October 2009, Ismail injured in UAE's friendly match against Palestine, and was out for almost five weeks. On 24 November 2009, Ismail returned from injury and play against Baniyas in the UAE President's Cup and played in the last minutes.

On 1 December 2009, in week 7 of the season in match against Al Ain which known as UAE's El classico, he replaced Fahad Masoud in the 64th minutes., he had a chance in the last minutes but he did not succeed in the elusive and Waleed Salim which beyond ball. The match was ended 1–0 in favor of Al-Wahda. On 17 December 2009, Ismail named as The Most Popular Arab Player, commented Ismail, when received the award "This award is dear to his heart of pride and honor him, because the love of the fans and a badge on his chest and thanked everyone who voted him". On 20 December 2009, he played a key role in the match against Baniyas after scoring in 32 minutes, and was substituted on 79th minutes. The match ended 1–0 for Al-Wahda. Ismail had received invasion from Al-Ittihad to participate in the ceremony to retire star Hamzah Idris against Juventus on 30 December 2009.

==== AFC Champions League ====
On 30 January 2010 during AFC Champions League qualifying play-off, he played against Al-Karamah. He assisted Mahmoud Khamees to score the only goal in the match in the 72nd minute. Seven days later, on 6 February 2010, he scored against Churchill Brothers SC in the 85th minute and assisted twice, one for Fernando Baiano in the 45th minute and again to Abdulrahim Jumaa in the 63rd minute. The win helped Al Wahda qualify for the group stage of the tournament. He played 13 matches against Saudi clubs in the Asian Champions League, during which he won twice over Al-Ittihad and Al-Ahly, and drew 6 times, compared to losing on 5 occasions, while scoring 3 goals during those confrontations. Ittihad Jeddah is considered the most team that Ismail Matar faced in the AFC Champions League with 5 matches starting from the 2010 version, as it lost 2–0 to it, 4–0 in that version, and in the subsequent version it lost 3-0 and tied it 0-0, before He achieved his first victory in the 2019 edition 4–1, when Ismail scored a goal in that match. Matar played 3 matches against Al-Ahly Jeddah, winning 2–1 in the 2008 edition and drawing 0–0 in the other match, without shaking the net. While he played against Al-Hilal twice in the 2007 edition, he tied in the first without goals and scored a goal in the second, which ended 1-1 and qualified Al-Wahda advanced to the next round, and tied a third 2–2 in a match that brought them together in the 2017 edition. Ismail played against Al-Nasr in the final price of the 2019 edition, losing in one and drawing in the other, to bid his team farewell to the championship from that round and the 2021 quarter-finals, and scored his team's only goal despite the exclusion.

==== 2010–11 ====
On 19 February 2011, Matar scored his first hat-trick of the season in a 5–3 loss against Ittihad Kalba, he overtook Mohamed Salem as Al Wahda's all-time greatest scorer in the Pro-League. In 2016, Matar has been rumoured to join Selangor FC in Malaysian Super league.

== International career ==
=== 2003 World Youth Championships ===
Ismail was part of UAE's squad for 2003 FIFA World Youth Championship which held in home country. He began his stardom to reach to the quarter-finals when he scored the only goal in the tournament against Australia. However, UAE knocked out from tournament in match against Colombia. He won the Golden Ball award and became the first Arab player to wins this award.

=== 2007 Gulf Cup ===
Known Ismail when he leading United Arab Emirates national football team to their first ever trophy at the 18th Arabian Gulf Cup, and his goals was critical in the tournament. When he scored against Kuwait in the 90+1 minute, UAE qualify to semi-final and against Saudi Arabia in the 90+1 minute, UAE qualify to final. In the final match, he scored a goal against Oman in the 72nd minute to lead UAE to win their first title in the Gulf Cup, Matar was named as MVP player of the tournament after scoring five goals in the tournament that makes him top scorer of the edition. He is the third player to win both titles on the best player and top scorer in the tournament after Iraqi player Hussein Saeed in 1984 and Qatari Mubarak Mustafa in 1992.

=== 2012 Olympic ===
Matar was named as one of the three overage players to participate in the 2012 Summer Olympics in London, United Kingdom.

=== Recent ===
Ismail called up for two friendly matches against Palestine on 10 October 2009 and Jordan on 14 October. He was injured in match against Palestine and was replaced in 30th minute. On 5 November 2009, UAE coach Srečko Katanec announced the squad for the next training camp in November 2009, but Ismail was not called up because of injury. He was returned to the squad for the friendly match against Kuwait on 16 December 2009.

Matar faced cheekbone fracture during Arabian Gulf League in late 2018 and had to go through surgery.

== Career statistics ==
=== Club ===
As of 25 May 2024

| Club | Season | League | | | Cup (Note: Includes UAE Super Cup and UAE President Cup, Etisalat Emirates Cup, Emir of Qatar Cup) | | | Asia (Note: Includes AFC Champions League) | | | Club World Cup | | | Total | | |
| Club | Season | Apps | Goals | Assists | Apps | Goals | Assists | Apps | Goals | Assists | Apps | Goals | Assists | Apps | Goals | Assists |
|---|---|---|---|---|---|---|---|---|---|---|---|---|---|---|---|---|
| Al-Wahda | 2001–02 | 7 | 1 | 2 | 6 | 3 | 2 | 2 | 0 | 1 | — | | | 15 | 4 | 5 |
| Al-Wahda | 2002–03 | 19 | 11 | 7 | 4 | 1 | 3 | 0 | 0 | 0 | — | | | 23 | 12 | 10 |
| Al-Wahda | 2003–04 | 11 | 3 | 4 | 5 | 1 | 3 | 6 | 0 | 3 | — | | | 22 | 4 | 10 |
| Al-Wahda | 2004–05 | 18 | 12 | 7 | 4 | 2 | 1 | 0 | 0 | 0 | — | | | 22 | 14 | 8 |
| Al-Wahda | 2005–06 | 17 | 10 | 9 | 7 | 3 | 6 | 4 | 2 | 3 | — | | | 28 | 15 | 18 |
| Al-Wahda | 2006–07 | 19 | 6 | 5 | 6 | 2 | 8 | 8 | 1 | 0 | — | | | 33 | 9 | 13 |
| Al-Wahda | 2007–08 | 21 | 5 | 4 | 2 | 0 | 1 | 4 | 0 | 2 | — | | | 27 | 5 | 7 |
| Al-Wahda | 2008–09 | 18 | 8 | 7 | 1 | 0 | 4 | 6 | 0 | 0 | — | | | 25 | 9 | 11 |
| Al-Wahda | Total | 130 | 57 | 45 | 35 | 13 | 28 | 30 | 3 | 9 | — | | | 195 | 73 | 82 |
| Al-Sadd (loan) | 2009 | — | | | 2 | 1 | 1 | — | | | | | | 2 | 1 | 1 |
| Al-Sadd (loan) | Total | — | | | 2 | 1 | 1 | — | | | | | | 2 | 1 | 1 |
| Al-Wahda | 2009–10 | 18 | 5 | - | 4 | 0 | 0 | 0 | 0 | 0 | — | | | 22 | 5 | 0 |
| Al-Wahda | 2010–11 | 17 | 6 | - | 8 | 0 | 0 | 5 | 1 | 0 | 3 | 1 | 0 | 33 | 8 | 0 |
| Al-Wahda | 2011–12 | 17 | 3 | - | 6 | 0 | 0 | 5 | 2 (Note: Appearance in 2012 GCC Champions League) | - | 0 | 0 | 0 | 28 | 5 | - |
| Al-Wahda | 2012–13 | 15 | 1 | - | 4 | 0 | 0 | 0 | 0 | 0 | 0 | 0 | 0 | 19 | 1 | 0 |
| Al-Wahda | 2013–14 | 22 | 4 | 7 | 4 | 0 | 0 | 0 | 0 | 0 | 0 | 0 | 0 | 26 | 4 | 0 |
| Al-Wahda | 2014–15 | 20 | 1 | 0 | 1 | 0 | 0 | 1 | 1 | 0 | 0 | 0 | 0 | 22 | 2 | 0 |
| Al-Wahda | 2015–16 | 23 | 5 | 4 | 8 | 1 | 0 | 0 | 0 | 0 | 0 | 0 | 0 | 31 | 6 | 0 |
| Al-Wahda | 2016–17 | 22 | 2 | 5 | 9 | 1 | 0 | 7 | 1 | 0 | 0 | 0 | 0 | 38 | 4 | 0 |
| Al-Wahda | 2017–18 | 17 | 2 | 1 | 7 | 0 | 0 | 5 | 0 | 0 | 0 | 0 | 0 | 29 | 2 | 0 |
| Al-Wahda | 2018–19 | 20 | 1 | 5 | 4 | 1 | 0 | 6 | 1 | 0 | 0 | 0 | 0 | 30 | 2 | 0 |
| Al-Wahda | 2019–20 | 14 | 1 | 4 | 3 | 0 | 0 | 2 | 0 | 0 | 0 | 0 | 0 | 19 | 1 | 0 |
| Al-Wahda | 2020–21 | 23 | 7 | 12 | 2 | 1 | 0 | 6 | 1 | 0 | 0 | 0 | 0 | 31 | 8 | 0 |
| Al-Wahda | 2021–22 | 23 | 4 | 5 | 6 | 1 | 3 | 0 | 0 | 0 | 0 | 0 | 0 | 29 | 5 | 8 |
| Al-Wahda | 2022–23 | 18 | 1 | 5 | 3 | 0 | 0 | 2 (Note: Appearances in Arab Club Champions Cup) | 0 | 0 | 0 | 0 | 0 | 23 | 1 | 5 |
| Al-Wahda | 2023–24 | 19 | 2 | 0 | 7 | 0 | 3 | 1 | 0 | 0 | 0 | 0 | 0 | 28 | 2 | 3 |
| Al-Wahda | Total | 238 | 44 | 48 | 76 | 5 | 6 | 40 | 6 | 0 | 3 | 1 | 0 | 357 | 56 | 54 |
| Career Totals | | 418 | 101 | 93 | 113 | 19 | 35 | 70 | 9 | 9 | 3 | 1 | 0 | 604 | 130 | 137 |

=== International ===
As of 17 February 2022

United Arab Emirates
| Year | Apps | Goals |
| 2003 | 10 | 2 |
| 2004 | 16 | 3 |
| 2005 | 9 | 3 |
| 2006 | 9 | 3 |
| 2007 | 17 | 7 |
| 2008 | 16 | 5 |
| 2009 | 8 | 3 |
| 2010 | 4 | 1 |
| 2011 | 9 | 2 |
| 2012 | 6 | 3 |
| 2013 | 8 | 2 |
| 2014 | 3 | 0 |
| 2016 | 3 | 2 |
| 2017 | 6 | 0 |
| 2018 | 4 | 0 |
| 2019 | 5 | 0 |
| 2021 | 3 | 0 |
| Total | 136 | 36 |

Ismail Matar: International goals
| # | Date | Venue | Opponent | Score | Result | Competition |
|---|---|---|---|---|---|---|
| 1. | 30 October 2003 | Sharjah Stadium, Sharjah | Turkmenistan | 1–1 | 1–1 | 2004 AFC Asian Cup qualifier |
| 2. | 18 November 2003 | Maktoum Bin Rashid Al Maktoum Stadium, Dubai | Sri Lanka | 3–1 | 3–1 | 2004 AFC Asian Cup qualifier |
| 3. | 10 July 2004 | Hohhot People's Stadium, Hohhot | China | 2–0 | 2–2 | Friendly |
| 4. | 11 November 2004 | Al-Rashid Stadium, Dubai | Jordan | 2–0 | 4–0 | Friendly |
| 5. | 10 December 2004 | Jassim Bin Hamad Stadium, Doha | Qatar | 2–0 | 2–2 | 17th Arabian Gulf Cup |
| 6. | 9 February 2005 | Al-Rashid Stadium, Dubai | Switzerland | 1–1 | 1–2 | Friendly |
| 7. | 11 October 2005 | Sheikh Khalifa International Stadium, Al Ain | Oman | 1–0 | 2–2 | Friendly |
| 8. | 16 November 2005 | Abbasiyyin Stadium, Damascus | Syria | 2–0 | 3–0 | Friendly |
| 9. | 22 February 2006 | Al Maktoum Stadium, Dubai | Oman | 1–0 | 1–0 | 2007 AFC Asian Cup qualifier |
| 10. | 1 March 2006 | People's Football Stadium, Karachi | Pakistan | 2–1 | 4–1 | 2007 AFC Asian Cup qualifier |
| 11. | 10 December 2006 | Sheikh Zayed Stadium, Abu Dhabi | Slovakia | 1–2 | 1–2 | Friendly |
| 12. | 17 January 2007 | Sheikh Zayed Stadium, Abu Dhabi | Oman | 1–2 | 1–2 | 17th Arabian Gulf Cup |
| 13. | 23 January 2007 | Mohammed Bin Zayed Stadium, Abu Dhabi | Kuwait | 1–0 | 3–2 | 17th Arabian Gulf Cup |
| 14. | 23 January 2007 | Mohammed Bin Zayed Stadium, Abu Dhabi | Kuwait | 3–2 | 3–2 | 17th Arabian Gulf Cup |
| 15. | 27 January 2007 | Mohammed Bin Zayed Stadium Abu Dhabi | Saudi Arabia | 1–0 | 1–0 | 17th Arabian Gulf Cup |
| 16. | 31 January 2007 | Mohammed Bin Zayed Stadium, Abu Dhabi | Oman | 1–0 | 1–0 | 17th Arabian Gulf Cup |
| 17. | 21 June 2007 | MPPJ Stadium, Petaling Jaya | Malaysia | 2–0 | 3–1 | Friendly |
| 18. | 28 October 2007 | Mohammed Bin Zayed Stadium, Abu Dhabi | Vietnam | 1–0 | 5–0 | 2010 FIFA World Cup qualifier |
| 19. | 26 March 2008 | Abbasiyyin Stadium, Damascus | Syria | 1–1 | 1–1 | 2010 FIFA World Cup qualifier |
| 20. | 14 June 2008 | Al-Sadaqua Walsalam Stadium, Kuwait City | Kuwait | 1–0 | 3–2 | 2010 FIFA World Cup qualifier |
| 21. | 14 June 2008 | Al-Sadaqua Walsalam Stadium, Kuwait City | Kuwait | 2–0 | 3–2 | 2010 FIFA World Cup qualifier |
| 22. | 22 June 2008 | Al-Qatara Stadium, Al Ain | Syria | 1–2 | 1–3 | 2010 FIFA World Cup qualifier |
| 23. | 29 August 2008 | Mohammed Bin Zayed Stadium, Abu Dhabi | Bahrain | 1–1 | 2–3 | Friendly |
| 24. | 21 January 2009 | KLFA Stadium, Kuala Lumpur | Malaysia | 1–0 | 5–0 | 2011 AFC Asian Cup qualifier |
| 25. | 21 January 2009 | KLFA Stadium, Kuala Lumpur | Malaysia | 2–0 | 5–0 | 2011 AFC Asian Cup qualifier |
| 26. | 1 April 2009 | King Fahd International Stadium, Riyadh | Saudi Arabia | 2–1 | 2–3 | 2010 FIFA World Cup qualifier |
| 27. | 7 September 2010 | Al-Nahyan Stadium, Abu Dhabi | Kuwait | 2–0 | 3–0 | Friendly |
| 28. | 11 October 2011 | Suwon World Cup Stadium, Suwon | South Korea | 1–2 | 1–2 | 2014 FIFA World Cup qualifier |
| 29. | 15 November 2011 | Al-Sadaqua Walsalam Stadium, Kuwait City | Kuwait | 1–0 | 1–2 | 2014 FIFA World Cup qualifier |
| 30. | 29 January 2012 | Maktoum Bin Rashid Al Maktoum Stadium, Dubai | Uzbekistan | 1–0 | 1–0 | Friendly |
| 31. | 29 February 2012 | Al Nahyan Stadium, Abu Dhabi | Lebanon | 3–2 | 4–2 | 2014 FIFA World Cup qualifier |
| 32. | 12 October 2012 | Maktoum Bin Rashid Al Maktoum Stadium, Dubai | Uzbekistan | 1–0 | 2–2 | Friendly |
| 33. | 9 November 2013 | Al Nahyan Stadium, Abu Dhabi | Philippines | 3–0 | 4–0 | Friendly |
| 34. | 19 November 2013 | Mohammed Bin Zayed Stadium, Abu Dhabi | Vietnam | 2–0 | 5–0 | 2015 AFC Asian Cup qualifier |
| 35. | 9 November 2016 | Mohammed Bin Zayed Stadium, Abu Dhabi | Bahrain | 1–0 | 2–0 | Friendly |
| 36. | 15 November 2016 | Mohammed Bin Zayed Stadium, Abu Dhabi | Iraq | 2–0 | 2–0 | 2018 FIFA World Cup qualifier |

== Honours ==
Al Wahda

- UAE Pro League: 2000–01, 2004–05, 2009–10
- UAE President's Cup: 2016–17
- UAE Federation Cup: 2001
- UAE League Cup: 2015–16, 2017–18, 2023–24
- UAE Super Cup: 2002, 2011, 2017, 2018

United Arab Emirates

- Arabian Gulf Cup: 2007, 2013

Individual

- FIFA U-20 World Cup Player of the Tournament: 2003
- Al Hadath Most promising Arab player of the Year: 2004
- Pro-League Player of the Year: 2006
- Arabian Gulf Cup Player of the Tournament: 2007
- Arabian Gulf Cup top scorer: 2007
- Al Ittihad Pro-League player of the Year: 2007
- Al-Ahram Silver Team of the Year: 2007
- Al-Ahram Golden Team of the Year: 2009

== Personal life ==
Matar has a close relationship with the midfielder of Oman national football team and Al Ittihad player Ahmed Hadid as they are cousins. Ismail has two footballer brothers. They are Ahmed (retired) and Yasser (born in 1987, playing for Al-Jazira since 2009). Matar is married to the daughter of Adel Khalifa Al Shamsi, they married in Abu Dhabi on 13 July 2007, the couple have two children, Alia (born 4 December 2008) and Ali (born 1 November 2010). His father died on 2 January 2009 and Matar was in the 19th Arabian Gulf Cup in Oman, he did not participate with the national team and instead left to the UAE to attend the funeral of his father.

== See also ==
- List of men's footballers with 100 or more international caps

== Notes ==
Awards and achievements
| Preceded by Talal Yousef | Arabian Gulf Cup MVP; 2007 | Succeeded by Majed Al-Marshedi |
| Preceded by Imad Al-Hosni | Arabian Gulf Cup top scorer 2007 | Succeeded by Hassan Rabia |
