= 2017 UAE Super Cup =

Al Wahda	Al Jazira
2	0
- Date: 20 January 2018
- Venue: Baniyas Stadium, Abu Dhabi
- Referee: Sultan Abdul Razzaq Al Marzouqi

The 2017 UAE Super Cup was the 17th and the 10th Professional UAE Super Cup, held at the Baniyas Stadium, Abu Dhabi on 20 January 2018 between Al Jazira, winners of the 2016–17 UAE Pro-League and Al Wahda, winners of 2017–18 UAE President's Cup. Al Wahda won the game 2–0.

== Details ==
20 January 2018
21:00 GMT+4

Al Wahda	2–0	Al Jazira
Batna 21'; Dzsudzsák 59' (pen.)	Report

Baniyas Stadium, Abu Dhabi
Referee: Sultan Abdul Razzaq Al Marzouqi

Al Wahda	Al Jazira

GK	1	(United Arab Emirates) Mohamed Al Shamsi
RB	2	(United Arab Emirates) Mohamed Barghash
CB	4	(United Arab Emirates) Salem Sultan
CB	12	(United Arab Emirates) Mohammed Salem	(yellow card) 11'	(substituted off) 62'
LB	23	(South Korea) Rim Changwoo
DM	5	(United Arab Emirates) Mohammad Al Abdulla		(substituted off) 76'
CM	6	(United Arab Emirates) Sultan Al Ghaferi	(yellow card) 88'
CM	22	(Hungary) Balázs Dzsudzsák
RW	9	(Morocco) Mourad Batna
LW	11	(Argentina) Sebastián Tagliabúe
ST	10	(United Arab Emirates) Ismail Matar (c)		(substituted off) 66'
Substitutes:
GK	50	(United Arab Emirates) Rashed Ali
DF	19	(United Arab Emirates) Khaled Ebraheim		(substituted in) 62'
MF	7	(United Arab Emirates) Mohamed Al-Shehhi
MF	14	(United Arab Emirates) Khaled Ba Wazir
MF	15	(United Arab Emirates) Nasir Abdelhadi
MF	36	(United Arab Emirates) Ahmed Al Akberi		(substituted in) 76'
FW	42	(United Arab Emirates) Mohamed Al-Akbari		(substituted in) 66'
Manager:
(Romania) Laurențiu Reghecampf

GK	55	(United Arab Emirates) Ali Khasif (c)	(yellow card) 58'
RWB	2	(United Arab Emirates) Mohamed Fawzi
CB	5	(United Arab Emirates) Musallem Fayez
CB	4	(United Arab Emirates) Mohammed Al-Musalami
CB	44	(United Arab Emirates) Fares Juma
LWB	51	(United Arab Emirates) Khalifa Al Hammadi		(substituted off) 62'
DM	10	(Morocco) Mbark Boussoufa	(yellow card) 90+2'
CM	12	(United Arab Emirates) Salem Rashid Obaid
CM	50	(United Arab Emirates) Mohammed Jamal	(yellow card) 35'
CF	7	(United Arab Emirates) Ali Mabkhout
CF	31	(Brazil) Romarinho
Substitutes:
GK	36	(United Arab Emirates) Khalid Al Senaani
DF	3	(United Arab Emirates) Salem Al Eedi
DF	4	(United Arab Emirates) Mohammed Ali Ayed
MF	15	(United Arab Emirates) Khalfan Mubarak
MF	21	(United Arab Emirates) Yaqoub Al Hosani
MF	23	(United Arab Emirates) Harib Al-Saadi
FW	70	(United Arab Emirates) Ahmed Al Hashmi		(substituted in) 62'
Manager:
(Netherlands) Henk ten Cate

Assistant referees:
Sabet Obaid Al Ali
Ali Abdulla Al Shehhi
Fourth official:
Abdulla Mohamed Eshtairy

== See also ==
- 2016–17 UAE Pro-League
- 2016–17 UAE President's Cup
