= 2015–16 UAE Pro League =

UAE Pro League
- Season: 2015–16
- Champions: Al-Ahli (7th title)
- Relegated: Fujairah; Al-Shaab
- 2017 AFC Champions League: Al-Ahli; Al-Jazira; Al-Ain; Al-Wahda
- 2017 GCC Champions League: Al-Wasl; Al-Dhafra
- Matches: 182
- Goals: 573 (3.15 per match)
- Average goals/game: 3.15
- Top goalscorer: Sebastián Tagliabué (25 goals)
- Biggest home win: Al-Ahli 8-1 Fujairah (19 August 2015)
- Biggest away win: Dibba Al Fujairah 0-4 Al-Wahda (20 August 2015); Dibba Al Fujairah 0-4 Al-Dhafra (23 April 2016)
- Highest scoring: Al-Shaab 3-6 Fujairah (22 January 2016)
- Longest winning run: 8 games Al-Ahli
- Longest unbeaten run: 16 games Al-Ahli
- Longest winless run: 16 games Al-Shaab
- Longest losing run: 8 games Emirates
- Highest attendance: Al-Ain vs. Al-Wahda (18,126)
- Lowest attendance: Dibba Al Fujairah vs. Al-Shaab (168)
- Average attendance: 2,557

The 2015–16 UAE Pro League (also known as Arabian Gulf League for sponsorship reasons) was the 41st top-level football season in the United Arab Emirates. Fourteen teams participated with Al-Ain as the defending champions after securing the championship last season for the twelfth time. Al-Ahli won its 7th title on 29 April despite being held to a 2–2 draw at home.

== Teams ==
=== Stadia and locations ===
Locations of teams in the 2015–16 UAE Pro League

Team	Stadium	Town	Capacity	Manager
Al-Ahli	Al-Rashid Stadium	Dubai	8,844	(Romania) Cosmin Olăroiu
Al-Ain	Hazza Bin Zayed Stadium	Al Ain	22,717	(Croatia) Zlatko Dalić
Al-Dhafra	Al Dhafra Stadium	Madinat Zayed	5,000	(Syria) Mohammad Kwid
Al-Jazira	Mohammed Bin Zayed Stadium	Abu Dhabi	42,056	(Netherlands) Henk ten Cate
Al-Nasr	Al-Maktoum Stadium	Dubai	10,750	(Serbia) Ivan Jovanović
Al-Shaab	Khalid Bin Mohammed Stadium	Sharjah	5,000	(Italy) Stefano Cusin
Al-Shabab	Maktoum Bin Rashid Al Maktoum Stadium	Dubai	8,011	(Brazil) Caio Júnior
Al-Wahda	Al Nahyan Stadium	Abu Dhabi	11,456	(Mexico) Javier Aguirre
Al-Wasl	Zabeel Stadium	Dubai	8,439	(Argentina) Gabriel Calderón
Baniyas	Baniyas Stadium	Abu Dhabi	8,954	(United Arab Emirates) Abdullah Mesfer
Dibba Al Fujairah	Fujairah Club Stadium	Fujairah	10,645	(Germany) Theo Bücker
Emirates	Emirates Club Stadium	Ras al-Khaimah	5,127	(Brazil) Paulo Comelli
Fujairah	Fujairah Club Stadium	Fujairah	10,645	(Czech Republic) Ivan Hašek
Sharjah	Sharjah Stadium	Sharjah	11,073	(United Arab Emirates) Abdulaziz Al-Anbari

== Foreign players ==
The number of foreign players is restricted to four per team, including a slot for a player from AFC countries. A team could use four foreign players on the field during each game including at least one player from the AFC country.

- Players name in **bold** indicates the player is registered during the mid-season transfer window.
- Players in italics were out of squad or left club within the season, after pre-season transfer window, or in the mid-season transfer window, and at least had one appearance.

Club	Player 1	Player 2	Player 3	AFC Player	Former players
Al-Ahli	(Brazil) **Ciel**	(Brazil) Éverton Ribeiro	(Senegal) Moussa Sow	(South Korea) Kwon Kyung-won	(Brazil) Lima (Morocco) Oussama Assaidi
Al-Ain	(Brazil) **Douglas**	(Brazil) Fellipe Bastos	(Colombia) **Danilo Asprilla**	(South Korea) Lee Myung-joo	(Netherlands) Ryan Babel (Nigeria) Emmanuel Emenike
Al-Dhafra	(Morocco) **Adil Hermach**	(Morocco) **Issam El Adoua**	(Senegal) Makhete Diop	(Ba'athist Syria) **Omar Khribin**	(Argentina) Jorge Luna (Iraq) Ahmed Ibrahim Khalaf (Spain) David Barral
Al-Jazira	(Brazil) Thiago Neves	(Spain) **Ángel Lafita**	(Trinidad and Tobago) **Kenwyne Jones**	(South Korea) Park Jong-woo	(Montenegro) Mirko Vučinić (Peru) Jefferson Farfán
Al-Nasr	(Brazil) Nilmar	(Burkina Faso) Jonathan Pitroipa	(France) Jirès Kembo Ekoko	(Chile) Luis Jiménez ^{1}	
Al-Shaab	(Brazil) **Maikon Leite**	(Brazil) **Marcão**	(Brazil) **Zé Eduardo**	(Uzbekistan) **Shavkat Mullajanov**	(Brazil) Célio Santos ^{2} (Chile) Matías Donoso (Egypt) Amr El Solia (France) Michaël N'dri
Al-Shabab	(Brazil) **Juninho Potiguar**	(Chile) Carlos Villanueva	(Moldova) Henrique Luvannor	(Uzbekistan) Azizbek Haydarov	(Brazil) Jô
Al-Wahda	(Argentina) Sebastián Tagliabué	(Brazil) Denílson	(Chile) Jorge Valdivia	(South Korea) **Rim Chang-woo**	(Kuwait) Hussain Fadhel
Al-Wasl	(Brazil) Fábio Lima	(Brazil) **Rogerinho**	(Portugal) Hugo Viana	(Brazil) Caio Canedo ^{3}	(Brazil) Edgar
Baniyas	(Algeria) Ishak Belfodil	(Argentina) Joaquín Larrivey	(Netherlands) Royston Drenthe	(Australia) Mark Milligan	
Dibba Al Fujairah	(Burkina Faso) Bakare Kone	(Ivory Coast) Boris Kabi	(Ivory Coast) **Brahima Diakite**	(Lebanon) Bilal El Najjarine	(Brazil) Elias
Emirates	(Brazil) Renan Garcia	(Brazil) Rodrigo Pimpão	(Senegal) **Alassane Diallo**	(Australia) Brett Holman	(Colombia) Wilmar Jordán (Morocco) Issam Erraki
Fujairah	(Algeria) Madjid Bougherra	(France) Christophe Mandanne	(Nigeria) Patrick Friday Eze	(Lebanon) Hassan Maatouk	
Sharjah	(Brazil) Maicosuel	(Brazil) Maurício Ramos	(Brazil) **Ricardinho**	(Brazil) Wanderley ^{4}	(Brazil) Renato Cajá

^1 Luis Jiménez has Palestinian citizenship and was counted as Asian player.

^2 Célio Santos has East Timorese citizenship and was counted as Asian player.

^3 Caio Canedo has East Timorese citizenship and was counted as Asian player.

^4 Wanderley has Indonesian citizenship and was counted as Asian player.

== League table ==
Pos	Team	Pld	W	D	L	GF	GA	GD	Pts	Qualification or relegation
1	Al-Ahli (C)	26	21	3	2	60	20	+40	66	Qualification to the 2017 AFC Champions League group stage
2	Al-Ain	26	18	3	5	53	24	+29	57	Qualification to the 2017 AFC Champions League group stage
3	Al-Wahda	26	13	4	9	45	28	+17	43	Qualification to the 2017 AFC Champions League play-off round and the 2016–17 Arab Club Championship Group Stage
4	Al-Nasr	26	11	8	7	47	36	+11	41	
5	Al-Shabab	26	11	7	8	34	27	+7	40	
6	Al-Wasl	26	11	6	9	42	36	+6	39	Qualification to the 2017 GCC Champions League
7	Al-Jazira	26	11	4	11	51	50	+1	37	Qualification to the 2017 AFC Champions League group stage
8	Al-Dhafra	26	9	7	10	37	39	−2	34	Qualification to the 2017 GCC Champions League
9	Baniyas	26	8	9	9	41	47	−6	33	
10	Dibba Al Fujairah	26	8	5	13	32	46	−14	29	
11	Sharjah	26	7	7	12	32	40	−8	28	
12	Emirates	26	7	6	13	34	47	−13	27	
13	Fujairah (R)	26	7	5	14	43	62	−19	26	Relegation to the UAE Division One
14	Al-Shaab (R)	26	1	4	21	22	71	−49	7	Relegation to the UAE Division One

Updated to match(es) played on 8 May 2016. Source: UAE League
Rules for classification: 1) points; 2) goal difference; 3) number of goals scored.
(C) Champions; (R) Relegated

== Statistics ==
=== Top scorers ===
As of matches played 8 May 2016

Rank	Player	Club	Goals	Penalty Goals
1	(Argentina) Sebastián Tagliabué	Al-Wahda	25	1
2	(United Arab Emirates) Ali Mabkhout	Al-Jazira	23	5
3	(Brazil) Fábio Lima	Al-Wasl	20	1
4	(Brazil) Wanderley	Sharjah	15	2
5	(Argentina) Joaquín Larrivey	Baniyas	15	1
6	(Nigeria) Patrick Friday Eze	Fujairah	14	0
7	(Senegal) Makhete Diop	Al-Dhafra	13	3
8	(Senegal) Moussa Sow	Al-Ahli	13	2
9	(Algeria) Ishak Belfodil	Baniyas	11	1
10	(Brazil) Nilmar	Al-Nasr	11	0

Source: Soccerway

=== Fair Play Ranking ===
As of matches played 8 May 2016

Pos	Team	Yellow Cards	Red Cards	Points
1	Al-Ain	41	2	46
2	Al-Ahli	60	2	64
3	Al-Nasr	57	5	69
4	Dibba Al Fujairah	51	7	69
5	Sharjah	59	5	71
6	Al-Dhafra	64	4	75
7	Emirates	65	5	76
8	Al-Shaab	62	6	77
9	Fujairah	69	4	79
10	Al-Shabab	69	5	80
11	Baniyas	71	5	83
12	Al-Jazira	72	5	84
13	Al-Wasl	62	10	84
14	Al-Wahda	82	5	94

Rules for fair play ranking: 1) 3 points for direct red card. 2) 2 points for indirect red card 3) 1 point for every yellow card

The team with the lowest number of points will be ranked top.

Source: Fairplay - Arabian Gulf League
