= 2016–17 UAE Pro League =

UAE Pro-League
- Season: 2016–17
- Champions: Al-Jazira (2nd title)
- Relegated: Baniyas; Kalba
- 2018 AFC Champions League: Al-Jazira; Al-Wahda; Al-Wasl; Al-Ain
- 2017 FIFA Club World Cup: Al-Jazira
- Matches: 364
- Goals: 573 (1.57 per match)
- Top goalscorer: (33 Goals) Ali Mabkhout
- Biggest home win: Al-Wasl 8–0 Dibba (8 December 2016)
- Biggest away win: Sharjah 1–7 Al-Wahda (2 November 2016)
- Highest scoring: Al-Shabab 3–7 Al-Jazira (3 December 2016)
- Longest winning run: 8 Matches Al-Jazira
- Longest unbeaten run: 13 Matches Al-Ain
- Longest winless run: 11 Matches Emirates
- Longest losing run: 7 Matches Baniyas
- Highest attendance: Al-Ain 1–1 Al-Ahli (22,546)
- Lowest attendance: Hatta 0–1 Al-Dhafra (450)

The 2016–17 UAE Pro League (also known as Arabian Gulf League for sponsorship reasons) was the 42nd season of top-level football in the United Arab Emirates. Al-Ahli are the defending champions of this season's UAE pro league after securing their seventh title last season. Al-Jazira won its second title on 29 April 2017 after defeating Hatta 5-0.

== Stadia and locations ==
Locations of teams in the 2016–17 UAE Pro League

Club	Home city	Stadium	Capacity
Al-Ahli	Dubai	Al-Rashid Stadium	15,000
Al-Ain	Al-Ain	Hazza Bin Zayed Stadium	25,000
Al-Dhafra	Madinat Zayed	Al Dhafra Stadium	5,012
Al-Jazira	Abu Dhabi	Mohammad Bin Zayed Stadium	42,056
Al-Nasr	Dubai	Al-Maktoum Stadium	10,750
Al-Shabab	Dubai	Maktoum Bin Rashid Al Maktoum Stadium	12,000
Sharjah	Sharjah	Sharjah Stadium	11,073
Al-Wahda	Abu Dhabi	Al Nahyan Stadium	11,456
Al-Wasl	Dubai	Zabeel Stadium	8,439
Baniyas	Abu Dhabi	Baniyas Stadium	8,954
Dibba	Fujairah	Fujairah Club Stadium	10,645
Emirates	Ras Al-Khaimah	Emirates Club Stadium	5,127
Hatta	Hatta	Hamdan Bin Rashid Stadium	5,000
Kalba	Kalba	Ittihad Kalba Stadium	8,500

== Personnel and kits ==
Note: Flags indicate national team as has been defined under FIFA eligibility rules. Players may hold more than one non-FIFA nationality.

Team	Head coach	Assistant coach	Captain	Kit manufacturer	Shirt sponsor
Al-Ahli	(Romania) Cosmin Olăroiu	(Romania) Catalin Necula	(United Arab Emirates) Ahmed Khalil	Nike	Skydive Dubai
Al-Ain	(Croatia) Zoran Mamić	(Croatia) Borimir Perkovic		Nike	First Gulf Bank
Al-Dhafra	(Ba'athist Syria) Mohammad Kwid	(Morocco) Badreddine Al-Idrissi		Adidas	
Al-Jazira	(Netherlands) Henk ten Cate	(Netherlands) Jan Versleijen	(United Arab Emirates) Ali Khasif	Nike	IPIC
Al-Nasr	(Romania) Dan Petrescu	(Moldova) Emil Caras (Romania) Valeriu Bordeanu		Adidas	Dubai Silicon Oasis Authority; Emirates NBD; DP World
Al-Shabab	(Netherlands) Fred Rutten	(Netherlands) Patrick Greveraars (United Arab Emirates) Saad Obaid		Umbro	Al-Naboodah
Sharjah	(Portugal) José Peseiro			Adidas	SAIF Zone
Al-Wahda	(Mexico) Javier Aguirre	(Spain) Juan Erabrin	(United Arab Emirates) Ismail Matar	Adidas	Al-Wahda Mall
Al-Wasl	(Argentina) Rodolfo Arruabarrena	(United Arab Emirates) Saleem Abdulrahman	(United Arab Emirates) Waheed Ismail	Macron	Saif Belhasa Holding
Baniyas	(Portugal) José Manuel Gomes	(United Arab Emirates) Salem Al-Arfi	(United Arab Emirates) Yousif Jaber	Adidas	Saaed; Secure Engineering
Dibba	(Portugal) Paulo Sérgio	(Egypt) Tarek Al-Sayed		uhlsport	
Emirates	(Germany) Theo Bücker	(Germany) Klaus Dieter (Tunisia) Nourredine Al-Hadi	(United Arab Emirates) Haidar Alo Ali	uhlsport	
Hatta	(United Arab Emirates) Waleed Obaid	(United Arab Emirates) Mohammad Al-Ajmani		Adidas	
Kalba	(Italy) Fabio Viviani	(Tunisia) Salem Al-Qaddami		Errea	

=== Foreign players ===
The number of foreign players is restricted to four per team, including a slot for a player from AFC countries. A team could use four foreign players on the field during each game including at least one player from the AFC country.

- Players name in **bold** indicates the player is registered during the mid-season transfer window.
- Players in italics were out of squad or left club within the season, after pre-season transfer window, or in the mid-season transfer window, and at least had one appearance.

Club	Player 1	Player 2	Player 3	AFC Player	Former players
Al-Ahli	(Brazil) Éverton Ribeiro	(Ghana) Asamoah Gyan	(Senegal) **Makhete Diop**		(Brazil) Lima (South Korea) Kwon Kyung-won
Al-Ain	(Brazil) Caio Lucas	(Colombia) Danilo Asprilla	(Saudi Arabia) **Nasser Al-Shamrani**	(South Korea) Lee Myung-joo	(Brazil) Douglas
Al-Dhafra	(Morocco) Adil Hermach	(Morocco) Issam El Adoua		(Oman) **Khalid Al-Hajri**	(Senegal) Makhete Diop (Ba'athist Syria) Omar Khribin
Al-Jazira	(Brazil) Aílton	(Brazil) **Leonardo**	(Morocco) Mbark Boussoufa	(South Korea) Park Jong-woo	(Brazil) João Carlos (Brazil) Thiago Neves (Peru) Jefferson Farfán
Al-Nasr	(Brazil) **Wanderley**	(France) Jirès Kembo Ekoko	(Morocco) Abdelaziz Barrada	(Lebanon) **Joan Oumari**	(Burkina Faso) Jonathan Pitroipa (Iraq) Mohannad Abdul-Raheem
Al-Shabab	(Argentina) Tomás De Vincenti	(Ghana) **Nana Poku**	(Moldova) Henrique Luvannor	(Uzbekistan) Azizbek Haydarov	(Netherlands) Ruud Boymans
Sharjah	(Brazil) Digão	(Poland) Adrian Mierzejewski	(Venezuela) Gelmin Rivas	(Japan) **Chikashi Masuda**	(South Korea) Song Jin-hyung
Al-Wahda	(Argentina) Sebastián Tagliabué	(Chile) Jorge Valdivia	(Hungary) Balázs Dzsudzsák	(South Korea) Rim Chang-woo	
Al-Wasl	(Brazil) Fábio Lima	(Brazil) Ronaldo Mendes	(Brazil) **Serginho**	(Brazil) Caio Canedo ^{1}	(Portugal) Hélder Barbosa
Baniyas	(France) **Jean-Philippe Mendy**	(Martinique) **Harry Novillo**	(Nigeria) **Ezekiel Henty**	(Australia) Mark Milligan	(Argentina) Joaquín Larrivey (Brazil) Fellipe Bastos (Colombia) Daniel Hernández
Dibba	(Brazil) **Bruno Moraes**	(Brazil) **Derley**	(Morocco) **Driss Fettouhi**	(Jordan) Yaseen Al-Bakhit	(Brazil) Danilo Cirino (Ivory Coast) Hamed Koné (South Korea) Heo Jae-won (Suriname) Nicandro Breeveld
Emirates	(Argentina) Sebastián Sáez	(Morocco) Mourad Batna	(Sweden) **Osman Sow**	(Iraq) Ahmed Ibrahim Khalaf	(Australia) Zac Anderson (Brazil) Augusto César (Tunisia) Hocine Ragued
Hatta	(Brazil) **Rafael Silva**	(Brazil) Samuel	(Romania) Adrian Ropotan	(Australia) Nikolai Topor-Stanley	(Brazil) Rafael Bastos (Burkina Faso) Issiaka Ouédraogo (Jordan) Yaseen Al-Bakhit (Romania) Mihai Răduț
Kalba	(Brazil) **Ciel**	(Burkina Faso) **Bakare Kone**	(Mali) **Modibo Maïga**	(Iraq) Salam Shaker	(Romania) Mihai Costea (Spain) Carmelo González

^1 Caio Canedo has East Timorese citizenship and was counted as Asian player.

== Transfers ==
=== Managerial changes ===
Team	Outgoing manager	Date of vacancy	Manner of departure	Pos.	Incoming manager	Date of appointment
Al-Shabab	(Brazil) Caio Júnior	8 May 2016	End of contract	Pre-season	(Netherlands) Fred Rutten	11 May 2016
Sharjah	(United Arab Emirates) Abdulaziz Al-Anbari	13 May 2016	End of contract	Pre-season	(Greece) Georgios Donis	27 July 2016
Al-Wasl	(Argentina) Gabriel Calderón	25 May 2016	Sacked	Pre-season	(Argentina) Rodolfo Arruabarrena	6 June 2016
Baniyas	(United Arab Emirates) Abdullah Mesfer	5 June 2016	Mutual consent	Pre-season	(Uruguay) Pablo Repetto	
Dibba	(Germany) Theo Bücker	22 June 2016	Signed by Emirates	Pre-season	(Portugal) Paulo Sérgio	29 June 2016
Emirates	(Brazil) Paulo Comelli	31 May 2016	Mutual consent	Pre-season	(Germany) Theo Bücker	22 June 2016
Kalba	(Tunisia) Mourad Okbi	28 Aug 2016	Mutual consent	Pre-season	(Italy) Fabio Viviani	28 Aug 2016
Baniyas	(Uruguay) Pablo Repetto	22 October 2016	Sacked	12th	(Portugal) José Manuel Gomes	23 October 2016
Al-Nasr	(Serbia) Ivan Jovanović	31 October 2016	Sacked	8th	(Romania) Dan Petrescu	31 October 2016
Sharjah	(Greece) Georgios Donis	1 January 2017	Mutual consent	10th	(Portugal) José Peseiro	2 January 2017

== League table ==
Pos	Team	Pld	W	D	L	GF	GA	GD	Pts	Qualification or relegation
1	Al Jazira (C)	26	22	2	2	72	15	+57	68	Qualification to the 2017 FIFA Club World Cup and 2018 AFC Champions League group stage
2	Al Wasl	26	17	6	3	55	26	+29	57	Qualification to the 2018 AFC Champions League group stage
3	Al Ahli	26	16	8	2	50	18	+32	56	
4	Al Ain	26	17	4	5	58	37	+21	55	Qualification to the 2018 AFC Champions League play-off round
5	Al Wahda	26	10	9	7	54	40	+14	39	Qualification to the 2018 AFC Champions League group stage
6	Al Nasr	26	11	3	12	42	32	+10	36	
7	Al Dhafra	26	10	5	11	40	46	−6	35	
8	Al Shabab	26	7	9	10	24	44	−20	30	
9	Sharjah	26	6	8	12	31	47	−16	26	
10	Hatta	26	6	7	13	24	47	−23	25	
11	Emirates	26	5	5	16	33	51	−18	20	
12	Dibba	26	3	11	12	25	54	−29	20	
13	Kalba (R)	26	4	7	15	30	44	−14	19	Relegation to the UAE Division One
14	Baniyas (R)	26	3	6	17	33	70	−37	15	Relegation to the UAE Division One

Source: uae.agleague.ae
Rules for classification: 1) points; 2) head-to-head points; 3) head-to-head goal difference; 4) head-to-head goals scored; 5) head-to-head away goals scored; 6) goal difference; 7) number of goals scored; 8) number of away goals scored; 9) fair play ranking 10) draw
(C) Champions; (R) Relegated

== Results ==
Home \ Away	ALI	AIN	DHA	JAZ	NAS	SHA	WAH	WAS	YAS	EMI	DAF	HAT	KAL	SHR
Al-Ahli		1–2	3–3	2–1	2–1	4–1	2–1	0–0	2–1	4–0	4–1	6–0	0–0	2–2
Al Ain	1–1		5–2	1–3	3–0	2–1	3–2	2–1	1–0	5–2	1–2	2–0	2–1	3–0
Al Dhafra	0–2	1–2		0–4	2–4	3–0	0–3	1–1	0–1	2–1	5–0	4–3	2–1	0–0
Al Jazira	2–0	2–0	4–0		1–0	3–0	5–1	3–1	5–0	5–0	2–0	1–0	1–0	3–0
Al Nasr	0–1	1–2	2–2	2–0		0–1	3–0	1–2	2–2	1–0	4–0	1–2	2–1	1–0
Al Shabab	0–0	1–3	1–0	3–7	0–4		1–1	0–0	2–0	0–4	0–0	1–1	0–4	2–1
Al Wahda	1–2	1–1	0–0	1–1	5–1	1–1		1–2	6–2	0–0	2–2	3–2	1–1	5–1
Al Wasl	0–0	4–3	4–1	2–3	2–1	2–1	2–1		4–0	1–1	8–0	4–1	1–1	2–0
Baniyas	0–2	1–1	0–2	1–3	0–3	2–4	2–3	3–4		4–4	1–1	2–3	3–1	2–2
Emirates	0–3	3–2	0–3	1–1	1–0	0–1	1–2	1–2	6–0		0–2	0–2	3–2	2–3
Dibba Al-Fujairah	0–2	2–2	2–3	0–3	0–0	1–1	1–2	0–2	4–3	0–0		0–0	0–1	2–2
Hatta	0–3	2–3	0–1	0–5	1–0	0–0	0–0	0–1	0–1	2–1	2–2		2–1	0–0
Kalba	1–1	1–2	1–2	0–3	1–5	1–2	3–4	0–1	1–1	2–1	3–2	1–1		0–0
Sharjah	0–1	2–4	2–1	0–1	1–3	0–0	1–7	1–2	4–1	2–1	1–1	4–0	2–1	

Updated to match(es) played on 21 March 2017. Source: Soccerway
Legend: Blue = home team win; Yellow = draw; Red = away team win.

== Statistics ==
=== Top scorers ===
As of matches played 13 May 2017

Rank	Player	Club	Goals
1	(United Arab Emirates) Ali Mabkhout	Al-Jazira	33
2	(Brazil) Fábio Lima	Al-Wasl	25
3	(Senegal) Makhete Diop	Al-Ahli	21
4	(Argentina) Sebastián Tagliabué	Al-Wahda	19
5	(Brazil) Caio Canedo	Al-Wasl	14
6	(Argentina) Sebastián Sáez	Emirates	13
7	(United Arab Emirates) Ahmed Khalil	Al-Ahli	12

Source: agleague.ae
