= Sebastián Tagliabúe =

Professional footballer (born 1985)

Personal information
- Full name: Sebastián Lucas Tagliabúe
- Date of birth: 22 February 1985 (age 41)
- Place of birth: Olivos, Argentina
- Height: 1.81 m (5 ft 11 in)
- Position: Striker

Youth career
- –2003: Colegiales

Senior career*
Years	Team	Apps	(Gls)
2003–2008	Colegiales	123	(37)
2008	Everton	11	(5)
2009	Deportes La Serena	27	(13)
2010	Once Caldas	5	(0)
2010–2012	Al-Ettifaq	44	(21)
2012–2013	Al-Shabab	25	(19)
2013–2020	Al-Wahda	157	(152)
2020–2022	Al-Nasr	44	(21)
2022–2023	Al-Wahda	20	(6)
2023–2024	Sharjah	18	(5)
Total		474	(279)

International career
2020–2023	United Arab Emirates	19	(5)
- * Club domestic league appearances and goals

Sebastián Lucas Tagliabúe (born 22 February 1985) is a professional footballer who plays as a forward. Born in Argentina, he plays for the United Arab Emirates national team.

== Club career ==
Tagliabúe started his association football career at Primera C side Club Atletico Colegiales from 2003 to 2008. He helped win the Primera C (fourth tier) championship with Colegiales. He was signed abroad by Everton from the Primera División de Chile. Tagliabúe made his debut in a 5–5 draw against Deportes La Serena where he scored a hat-trick. After a spell at Everton where he scored six goals in 13 matches, Tagliabúe moved to Deportes La Serena scoring 13 times in 27 matches. After one year, in 2010, he moved to Once Caldas where he was able to participate in the 2010 Copa Libertadores.

=== Saudi Arabia ===
After his spell in Colombia, Tagliabúe moved overseas to Saudi Arabia after being approached by Al-Ittifaq. Tagliabúe scored 21 goals in 44 matches from 2010 to 2012. Al-Shabab signed him in 2012. Tagliabúe scored 19 goals in 25 matches in the 2012–13 Saudi Premier League season.

=== United Arab Emirates ===
Tagliabúe was offered to join UAE Pro-League side Al-Wahda and in June 2013 agreed to a five-year contract. He scored a hat-trick on 14 December 2017 in a UAE League Cup match against Al-Wasl. After spending seven years at the club winning at least four domestic titles, Tagliabúe joined Al-Nasr on a two-year contract. And on 13 June 2022, Tagliabúe joined his former club Al-Wahda.

== International career ==
In 2020, Tagliabúe was granted UAE passport, making him one of the first three South American-born players to represent the United Arab Emirates, alongside fellow Brazilian-born players Fábio Virginio de Lima and Caio Canedo Corrêa Following the naturalization, he was called up to the United Arab Emirates team by Jorge Luis Pinto in October 2020 where he made his debut against Uzbekistan and scored his first international goal in a 2–1 defeat.

== Career statistics ==
=== Club ===
Appearances and goals by club, season and competition
Club	Season	League			National cup (Note: Includes Copa Chile, Copa Colombia, King Cup, UAE President's Cup)		League cup (Note: Includes Saudi Crown Prince Cup, UAE League Cup)		Continental		Other		Total	
Club	Season	Division	Apps	Goals	Apps	Goals	Apps	Goals	Apps	Goals	Apps	Goals	Apps	Goals
Deportes La Serena	2009	Chilean Primera División	27	13	1	0	—		—		—		28	13
Once Caldas	2010	Categoría Primera A	5	0	2	2	—		1 (Note: Appearances in Copa Libertadores)	0	—		8	2
Ettifaq FC	2010–11	Saudi Pro League	23	12	2	1	3	2	—		—		28	15
Ettifaq FC	2011–12	Saudi Pro League	21	9	2	1	4	3	7 (Note: Appearances in AFC Cup)	8	—		34	21
Ettifaq FC	Total		44	21	4	2	7	5	7	8	—		62	36
Al-Shabab	2012–13	Saudi Pro League	25	19	4	0	1	0	8 (Note: Appearances in AFC Champions League)	4	—		38	23
Al-Wahda	2013–14	UAE Pro League	25	28	2	1	4	1	—		—		31	30
Al-Wahda	2014–15	UAE Pro League	22	15	1	1	5	3	1	0	—		29	19
Al-Wahda	2015–16	UAE Pro League	24	25	1	1	7	7	—		—		32	33
Al-Wahda	2016–17	UAE Pro League	20	18	4	3	6	4	7	5	—		37	30
Al-Wahda	2017–18	UAE Pro League	21	23	3	3	10	13	5	2	1 (Note: Appearance in UAE Super Cup)	0	40	41
Al-Wahda	2018–19	UAE Pro League	26	27	1	0	7	4	6	2	1	1	41	34
Al-Wahda	2019–20	UAE Pro League	19	15	1	1	5	0	3	1	—		28	17
Al-Wahda	Total		157	152	13	10	44	32	22	10	2	1	238	205
Al-Nasr	2020–21	UAE Pro League	25	11	4	2	3	0	—		—		32	13
Al-Nasr	2021–22	UAE Pro League	19	10	1	0	3	0	—		—		23	10
Al-Nasr	Total		44	21	5	2	6	0	—		—		55	23
Al-Wahda	2022–23	UAE Pro League	20	6	0	0	3	4	—		—		23	10
Sharjah	2023–24	UAE Pro League	18	5	2	0	2	1	5	0	1	0	28	6
Career total			340	237	31	16	63	42	43	22	3	1	481	318

=== International ===
Appearances and goals by national team and year
National team	Year	Apps	Goals
United Arab Emirates	2020	2	1
United Arab Emirates	2021	10	2
United Arab Emirates	2022	4	1
United Arab Emirates	2023	3	1
Total		19	5

Scores and results list the United Arab Emirates's goal tally first, score column indicates score after each Tagliabúe goal.

List of international goals scored by Sebastián Tagliabúe
No.	Date	Venue	Opponent	Score	Result	Competition
1.	12 October 2020	Rashid Stadium, Dubai, United Arab Emirates	Uzbekistan	1–2	1–2	Friendly
2.	29 March 2021	Zabeel Stadium, Dubai, United Arab Emirates	India	6–0	6–0	Friendly
3.	11 June 2021	Zabeel Stadium, Dubai, United Arab Emirates	Indonesia	5–0	5–0	2022 FIFA World Cup qualification
4.	30 December 2022	Al-Maktoum Stadium, Dubai, United Arab Emirates	Lebanon	1–0	1–0	Friendly
5.	7 January 2023	Al-Minaa Olympic Stadium, Basra, Iraq	Bahrain	1–2	1–2	25th Arabian Gulf Cup

== Honours ==
Club Atletico Colegiales

- Primera B Metropolitana: 2007–08

Al Wahda

- UAE President's Cup: 2016–17
- UAE League Cup: 2017–18
- UAE Super Cup: 2017, 2018

Individual

- Saudi Professional League top scorer: 2012–13
- UAE Pro-League top scorer: 2015–16, 2018–19
