= Ali Al-Hammadi =

Emirati footballer (born 1988)

Personal information
- Full name: Ali Ibrahim Ali Abdulla Al-Hammadi
- Date of birth: 27 January 1988 (age 38)
- Place of birth: Dubai, United Arab Emirates
- Height: 1.74 m (5 ft 9 in)
- Position: Midfielder

Senior career*
Years	Team	Apps	(Gls)
2006–2018	Al Dhafra	102+	(4+)
- * Club domestic league appearances and goals

Ali Ibrahim Ali Abdulla Al-Hammadi (Arabic: علي ابراهيم علي عبد الله الحمادي; born 27 January 1988) is an Emirati former professional footballer who played as a midfielder for Al Dhafra.
