= Saleh Abdulla =

Emirati football defender (born 1978)

Saleh Abdulla Obaid
Personal information
- Full name: Saleh Abdulla Obaid Mohsen Al-Areefi
- Date of birth: 8 December 1978 (age 47)
- Height: 1.77 m (5 ft 10 in)
- Position: Left back

Senior career*
Years	Team	Apps	(Gls)
2001–2012	Al Jazira		
2005–2006	Al Ain		

International career
2004–2008	United Arab Emirates	35	(2)
- * Club domestic league appearances and goals

Saleh Abdulla Obaid Mohsen Al-Areefi (8 December 1978) is an Emirati association footballer who played as a defender for United Arab Emirates in the 2004 AFC Asian Cup.
