= Wanderley (footballer, born 1988) =

Brazilian footballer

Personal information
- Full name: Wanderley Santos Monteiro Júnior
- Date of birth: October 11, 1988 (age 38)
- Place of birth: Campinas, Brazil
- Height: 1.82 m (5 ft 11 1/2 in)
- Position: Forward

Team information
- Current team: Paranavaí

Youth career
- Ponte Preta

Senior career*
Years	Team	Apps	(Gls)
2006–2008	Ponte Preta	95	(14)
2008–2010	Cruzeiro	20	(4)
2009	→ Santo André (loan)	10	(4)
2010	→ São Caetano (loan)	22	(5)
2010	→ Grêmio Barueri (loan)	19	(5)
2011	Flamengo	23	(7)
2011–2014	Al-Arabi	37	(19)
2014–2016	Al-Sharjah	68	(48)
2016–2018	Al Nasr	13	(7)
2019–2020	Coritiba	14	(3)
2020	Ponte Preta	6	(0)
2023	Paranavaí	3	(0)

Managerial career
- 2026–: Paranavaí
- * Club domestic league appearances and goals as of 3 January 2026

Wanderley Santos Monteiro Júnior, commonly known as Wanderley (born October 11, 1988), is a Brazilian football coach and former forward. He is currently the head coach of Atlético Clube Paranavaí.

== Career ==
=== Ponte Preta ===
Wanderley came through the youth ranks with Ponte Preta, and was called up to the senior squad for the 2006 Campeonato Paulista season. His performances in the tournament, scoring a total of three goals, second most in the team, earned him a new contract with the club. Despite being reassigned to the youth department, he still made 11 substitute appearances in 2006 Campeonato Brasileiro Série A, including a debut in the 3–2 win over Corinthians on 30 April 2006. In the 2008 Campeonato Brasileiro Série B he scored three goals in the first two months of the competition, causing Cruzeiro to show an interest and sign him on a three-year contract in July 2008, paying a fee to buy out the last year of his Ponte Preta contract. He finished his Ponte Preta career with 15 goals in 96 games in all competitions.

=== Cruzeiro ===
Wanderley was used sparingly as a substitute by Cruzeiro in 2008 Campeonato Brasileiro Série A, scoring his first goal for the club in the last round of the competition, against Portuguesa on 7 December 2008.

==== Santo Andre loan ====
In 2009 he again had little game time with Cruzeiro, and on 1 September he was loaned to Santo André. He scored on his debut in a 2–1 home defeat against Atlético Mineiro on 6 September 2009. Despite scoring four goals in his ten games, Santo Andre were relegated at the end of the season.

==== São Caetano loan ====
In January 2010 Wanderley was sent on loan to São Caetano until the end of the year. He scored five times in 22 games, as the club became runners-up in the competition.

==== Grêmio Prudente loan ====
In May 2010 Wanderley moved to Grêmio Prudente rather than see out his loan with São Caetano. He scored five times in 17 games in 2010 Campeonato Brasileiro Série A.

=== Flamengo ===
In January 2011, Wanderley signed a three-year contract with Flamengo. During the 2011 Campeonato Carioca season he competed for top scorer with his idol Ronaldinho, with both having scored five goals by mid-March. His 2011 Campeonato Brasileiro Série A campaign lasted only six games until the end of June.

=== Qatar: Al-Arabi ===
On 6 July 2011 it was announced that Wanderley had signed for Qatar Stars League side Al-Arabi for a reported fee of R$2 million. He was given shirt number 33, which was the same he wore at Flamengo. He made his debut in the group stages of the 2011 Sheikh Jassim Cup on 15 August 2011, scoring twice in the 3–0 victory over Al-Wakrah. Nine days later he scored another brace, as his team won the final against Umm Salal. On 17 September 2011, in the first league game of the season, he suffered a cruciate ligament injury, requiring an operation, and keeping him out for the rest of the season. He returned to Brazil to recuperate. His third season in Qatar was his best, scoring 12 goals in 19 games.

=== United Arab Emirates: Al Sharjah ===
Wanderley signed for UAE Pro-League side Al-Sharjah ahead of the 2014–15 season, linking up with manager Paulo Bonamigo who he had played under at Ponte Preta. His 17 goals (from 25 games) made him third top scorer in the 2014–15 UAE Pro-League season. In the 2015–16 season he added another 15 goals, but despite having a year left on his contract, an approach from another UAE club led to doubled wage demands which Al-Sharjah couldn't meet, so he announced his intention to leave the club.

=== United Arab Emirates: Al-Nasr ===
In July 2016, Wanderley signed a three-year deal with Al-Nasr. His Al-Nasr career was soon marred by controversy. As a result of the ban he received from the Asian Football Confederation, Wanderley was de-registered from the Al-Nasr squad. He was reinstated in the January mid-season transfer window, at which point the UAE FA handed him an additional 10-match ban. He came back from this ban on 11 March 2017, scoring a stoppage-time penalty in the 4–0 win over Al Shabab.

Wanderley started the 2017–18 season keen to put the past behind him, but another knee injury in the third game of the campaign against Al-Jazira put him on the sidelines for a couple of months. He returned to play cup matches in December and January, but on 14 March 2018 he was released by the club.

=== Coritiba ===
Wanderley was without a club for the rest of 2018, suffering another knee injury, and was signed on 24 January 2019 by Coritiba, initially until the end of Campeonato Paranaense in April. He did not make his debut until 18 March. He scored his only goal of the campaign in the derby against Londrina, but was also injured in the game and missed the rest of the campaign. Despite this, his contract was extended for the 2019 Campeonato Brasileiro Série B season.

== Career statistics ==
As of 7 April 2019

Club	Season	League			State League		Cup		Continental		Other		Total	
Club	Season	Division	Apps	Goals	Apps	Goals	Apps	Goals	Apps	Goals	Apps	Goals	Apps	Goals
Ponte Preta (Note: Ponte Preta appearance stats are incomplete, and are not included in totals)	2006	Série A	11	0	?	3	—		—		—		11	3
Ponte Preta	2008	Série B	?	3	?	?	—		—		—		?	3
Cruzeiro	2008	Série A	9	1	—		—		—		—		9	1
Cruzeiro	2009	Série A	5	0	5	3	—		1 (Note: Appearance in 2009 Copa Libertadores.)	0	—		10	3
Cruzeiro	Total		14	1	5	3	—		1	0	—		20	4
Santo André (loan)	2009	Série A	10	4	—		—		—		—		10	4
São Caetano (loan)	2010	Paulista	—		22	5	—		—		—		22	5
Grêmio Prudente (loan)	2010	Série A	17	5	—		—		—		2 (Note: Appearances in 2010 Copa Sudamericana.)	0	19	5
Flamengo (Note: according to combined sources on the Flamengo official website and Flaestatística.)	2011	Série A	6	0	12	4	5	3	—		—		23	7
Al-Arabi	2011–12	Stars League	1	0	—		—		—		— (Note: Appearances and goals in 2011 Sheikh Jassim Cup omitted, due to lack of clarity.)		1	0
Al-Arabi	2012–13	Stars League	15	4	—		—		—		1 (Note: Appearance in QSL Relegation Playoff.)	0	16	4
Al-Arabi	2013–14	Stars League	19	12	—		—		—		1 (Note: Appearance in 2013–14 Qatari Stars Cup.)	0	20	12
Al-Arabi	Total		35	16	—		—		—		2	0	37	16
Al-Sharjah	2014–15	Pro-League	25	17	—		8	5	—		—		33	22
Al-Sharjah	2015–16	Pro-League	26	15	—		6	7	—		—		32	22
Al-Sharjah	Total		51	32	—		14	12	—		—		65	44
Al-Nasr	2016–17	Pro-League	4	2	—		—		— (Note: 1 appearance and 2 goals in 2016 AFC Champions League lost due to forfeit of game.)		—		4	2
Al-Nasr	2017–18	Pro-League	3	2	—		2	2	—		—		5	4
Al-Nasr	Total		7	4	—		2	2	—		—		9	6
Coritiba	2019 in Brazilian football	Série B	0	0	4	1	0	0	—		—		4	1
Career Total			140	62	43	13	21	17	1	0	4	0	209	92

== Passport controversy ==
In the summer of 2016 Wanderley has acquired an Indonesian passport, which would have made him the first player of Indonesian nationality in the history of UAE Pro-League. However, in September 2016 he was provisionally suspended by the AFC, after they became aware that his Indonesian passport was alleged to be fake. This had important consequences for Al Nasr, as they were forced to forfeit a match they had originally won 3–0 against El Jaish, in which Wanderley had scored two goals, and were eventually eliminated from the 2016 AFC Champions League. On 11 November 2016, at the AFC disciplinary committee, Wanderley and Al-Nasr admitted the use of falsified documents. Wanderley was given a three-month suspension, backdated to 2 September. When he returned from this suspension the UAE FA handed him an additional 10-match ban.

== Honours ==
Flamengo

- Taça Guanabara: 2011
- Taça Rio: 2011
- Rio de Janeiro State League: 2011

Al-Arabi

- Sheikh Jassim Cup: 2011
