= Abdullah Abdulqader =

Emirati footballer (born 1989)

Personal information
- Full name: Abdullah Abdulqader
- Date of birth: 2 July 1989 (age 37)
- Place of birth: United Arab Emirates
- Height: 1.73 m (5 ft 8 in)
- Position: Winger

Youth career
- Al Jazira

Senior career*
Years	Team	Apps	(Gls)
2009–2012	Al Jazira		
2010	→ Al-Sharjah (loan)		
2011–2012	→ Dubai (loan)		
2012–2013	Ajman		
2013–2019	Al Dhafra		
2019–2022	Hatta		
- * Club domestic league appearances and goals

Abdullah Abdulqader (Arabic: عبد الله عبد القادر; born 2 July 1989) is an Emirati footballer. He plays as a winger.
