= Fábio Lima (footballer, born 1993) =

Emirati footballer (born 1993)

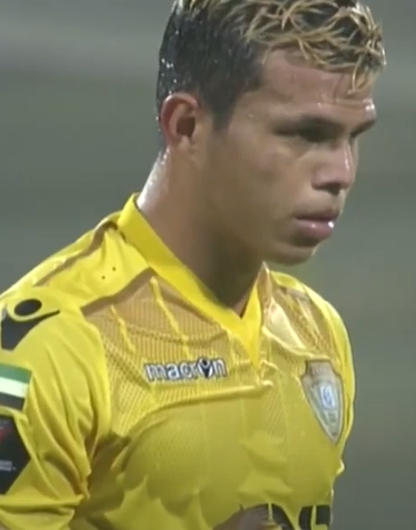
- Fábio Lima with Al Wasl in 2016

Personal information
- Full name: Fábio Virginio de Lima
- Date of birth: 30 June 1993 (age 33)
- Place of birth: Araçagi, Brazil
- Height: 1.76 m (5 ft 9 in)
- Positions: Attacking midfielder; winger

Team information
- Current team: Al Wasl
- Number: 10

Youth career
- 2012–2013: Atlético Goianiense
- 2012–2013: → São Paulo (loan)
- 2013: → Vasco da Gama (loan)

Senior career*
Years	Team	Apps	(Gls)
2011	Icasa	19	(0)
2012–2015	Atlético Goianiense	36	(10)
2013	→ Vasco da Gama (loan)	1	(0)
2014	→ Al Wasl (loan)	24	(16)
2015–	Al Wasl	268	(183)

International career^{‡}
2020–	United Arab Emirates	49	(17)
- * Club domestic league appearances and goals as of 15 May 2026 ‡ National team caps and goals as of 17 November 2026

Fábio Virginio de Lima (Arabic: فابيو دي ليما; born 30 June 1993) is a professional footballer who plays as a midfielder for UAE Pro League club Al Wasl. Born in Brazil, he represents the United Arab Emirates national team.

== Club career ==
Lima was signed by 2nd tier club Atlético Goianiense in 2012 after having a shorter span with Icasa. In 2013, he was loaned out to Serie A club Vasco da Gama making a single appearance.

On 21 July 2014, Lima joined UAE Football League side Al Wasl on a two-year loan after being recommended by manager Jorginho.

== International career ==
In February 2020, Lima obtained Emirati passport. On 12 October 2020, he made his international debut for the United Arab Emirates in a friendly match against Uzbekistan.

On 4 January 2024, Lima was named in the UAE's squad for the 2023 AFC Asian Cup. Later that year, on 19 November, he netted four goals in a 5–0 victory over Qatar during the 2026 FIFA World Cup qualification.

== Career statistics ==
=== Club ===
As of match played 15 May 2026

Club	Season	League			National cup (Note: Includes Copa do Brasil, UAE President's Cup)		League cup (Note: Includes UAE League Cup)		Continental		Other		Total	
Club	Season	Division	Apps	Goals	Apps	Goals	Apps	Goals	Apps	Goals	Apps	Goals	Apps	Goals
Icasa	2011	Série B	11	0	0	0	–		–		8 (Note: Appearances in Campeonato Cearense)	0	19	0
Atlético Goianiense	2012	Série B	0	0	2	2	–		–		3	0	5	2
Atlético Goianiense	2013	Série B	10	5	0	0	–		–		–		10	5
Atlético Goianiense	2014	Série B	8	2	4	0	–		–		15 (Note: Appearances in Campeonato Goiano)	3	27	5
Atlético Goianiense	Total		18	7	6	2	0	0	0	0	18	3	42	12
Vasco da Gama (loan)	2013	Série A	1	0	1	0	–		–		0	0	2	0
Al Wasl (loan)	2014–15	UAE Pro League	24	16	1	1	6	1	–		–		31	18
Al Wasl	2015–16	UAE Pro League	26	20	2	1	7	7	–		–		35	28
Al Wasl	2016–17	UAE Pro League	26	25	2	2	7	4	–		–		35	31
Al Wasl	2017–18	UAE Pro League	21	19	4	2	8	4	4 (Note: Appearances in AFC Champions League)	2	–		37	27
Al Wasl	2018–19	UAE Pro League	19	13	3	2	6	1	3	1	4 (Note: Appearances in Arab Club Champions Cup)	0	35	17
Al Wasl	2019–20	UAE Pro League	19	12	2	3	7	7	–		3	2	31	24
Al Wasl	2020–21	UAE Pro League	23	22	2	0	1	1	–		–		26	23
Al Wasl	2021–22	UAE Pro League	10	2	2	2	4	1	–		–		17	5
Al Wasl	2022–23	UAE Pro League	25	19	4	1	2	1	–		–		30	21
Al Wasl	2023–24	UAE Pro League	25	17	5	3	6	5	–		–		36	25
Al Wasl	2024–25	UAE Pro League	25	10	3	1	0	0	9 (Note: Appearances in AFC Champions League Elite)	3	1 (Note: Appearance in UAE Super Cup)	1	38	15
Al Wasl	2025–26	UAE Pro League	24	8	0	0	1	0	5 (Note: Appearances in AFC Champions League Elite)	4	–		30	12
Al Wasl	Total		268	183	30	18	55	32	21	10	8	3	383	246
Career total			296	190	37	20	55	32	21	10	34	6	446	258

=== International ===
As of match played 17 November 2026

Appearances and goals by national team and year
National team	Year	Apps	Goals
United Arab Emirates	2020	3	0
United Arab Emirates	2021	11	6
United Arab Emirates	2022	3	2
United Arab Emirates	2023	7	2
United Arab Emirates	2024	13	6
United Arab Emirates	2025	7	1
United Arab Emirates	2026	5	0
Total		49	17

Scores and results list United Arab Emirates' goal tally first, score column indicates score after each Lima goal.

List of international goals scored by Fábio Lima
No.	Date	Venue	Opponent	Score	Result	Competition	Ref.
1	29 March 2021	Zabeel Stadium, Dubai, United Arab Emirates	India	5–0	6–0	Friendly	
2	3 June 2021	Zabeel Stadium, Dubai, United Arab Emirates	Malaysia	2–0	4–0	2022 FIFA World Cup qualification	
3	3 June 2021	Zabeel Stadium, Dubai, United Arab Emirates	Malaysia	4–0	4–0	2022 FIFA World Cup qualification	
4	7 June 2021	Zabeel Stadium, Dubai, United Arab Emirates	Thailand	2–0	3–1	2022 FIFA World Cup qualification	
5	11 June 2021	Zabeel Stadium, Dubai, United Arab Emirates	Indonesia	2–0	5–0	2022 FIFA World Cup qualification	
6	11 June 2021	Zabeel Stadium, Dubai, United Arab Emirates	Indonesia	4–0	5–0	2022 FIFA World Cup qualification	
7	19 November 2022	Al Nahyan Stadium, Abu Dhabi, United Arab Emirates	Kazakhstan	1–0	2–1	Friendly	
8	19 November 2022	Al Nahyan Stadium, Abu Dhabi, United Arab Emirates	Kazakhstan	2–1	2–1	Friendly	
9	13 January 2023	Al-Minaa Olympic Stadium, Basra, Iraq	Qatar	1–0	1–1	25th Arabian Gulf Cup	
10	16 November 2023	Al Maktoum Stadium, Dubai, United Arab Emirates	Nepal	4–0	4–0	2026 FIFA World Cup qualification	
11	26 March 2024	Prince Saud bin Jalawi Sports City, Khobar, Saudi Arabia	Yemen	1–0	3–0	2026 FIFA World Cup qualification	
12	26 March 2024	Prince Saud bin Jalawi Sports City, Khobar, Saudi Arabia	Yemen	2–0	3–0	2026 FIFA World Cup qualification	
13	19 November 2024	Al Nahyan Stadium, Abu Dhabi, United Arab Emirates	Qatar	1–0	5–0	2026 FIFA World Cup qualification	
14	19 November 2024	Al Nahyan Stadium, Abu Dhabi, United Arab Emirates	Qatar	2–0	5–0	2026 FIFA World Cup qualification	
15	19 November 2024	Al Nahyan Stadium, Abu Dhabi, United Arab Emirates	Qatar	3–0	5–0	2026 FIFA World Cup qualification	
16	19 November 2024	Al Nahyan Stadium, Abu Dhabi, United Arab Emirates	Qatar	4–0	5–0	2026 FIFA World Cup qualification	
17	25 March 2025	Prince Faisal bin Fahd Sports City Stadium, Riyadh, Saudi Arabia	North Korea	1–0	2–1	2026 FIFA World Cup qualification	

== Honours ==
Al Wasl

- UAE Pro League: 2023–24
- UAE President's Cup: 2023–24
