= Khaled Ba Wazir =

Emirati footballer (born 1995)

Personal information
- Full name: Khaled Abdurahman Ba Wazir
- Date of birth: 8 May 1995 (age 31)
- Place of birth: Abu Dhabi, United Arab Emirates
- Height: 1.70 m (5 ft 7 in)
- Position: Midfielder

Team information
- Current team: Sharjah
- Number: 14

Youth career
- Al-Wahda

Senior career*
Years	Team	Apps	(Gls)
2014–2018	Al-Wahda	26	(1)
2017	→ Al-Wasl (loan)	5	(0)
2018–2020	Al Dhafra	40	(6)
2020–	Sharjah	35	(2)

International career
2016–	United Arab Emirates	10	(0)
- * Club domestic league appearances and goals

Khaled Abdurahman Ba Wazir (Arabic:خالد با وزير; born 8 May 1995) is an Emirati footballer who plays for Sharjah.

== Honours ==
Al Wahda

- UAE President's Cup: 2016–17
- UAE League Cup: 2015–16, 2017–18
- UAE Super Cup: 2018

Sharjah

- UAE President's Cup: 2021–22, 2022–23
- UAE League Cup: 2022–23
- UAE Super Cup: 2022
- AFC Champions League Two: 2024–25
