= Salem Saleh =

Emirati international footballer (born 1991)

Personal information
- Full name: Salem Saleh Al-Rejaibi
- Date of birth: 14 January 1991 (age 35)
- Place of birth: United Arab Emirates
- Height: 1.78 m (5 ft 10 in)
- Position: Forward

Youth career
- 2009–2010: Al-Wahda

Senior career*
| Years | Team | Apps | (Gls) |
| 2010–2015 | Al-Wahda | 80 | (8) |
| 2015–2020 | Al Nasr | 71 | (9) |
| 2020–2024 | Sharjah | 35 | (7) |
| 2024–2025 | Dibba Al-Hisn | 4 | (0) |

International career^{‡}
| 2011–2019 | United Arab Emirates | 12 | (5) |
- * Club domestic league appearances and goals as of 26 March 2016 ‡ National team caps and goals as of 26 March 2016

Salem Saleh Mussallam Salem Al-Rejaibi (سالم صالح; born 14 May 1991) is an Emirati international footballer who plays as a forward and midfielder. He played United Arab Emirates national football team in numerous competitions.

== International goals ==
Scores and results list United Arab Emirates' goal tally first.

| # | Date | Venue | Opponent | Score | Result | Competition |
|---|---|---|---|---|---|---|
| 1. | 5 October 2013 | Shenzhen Stadium, Shenzhen, China | Laos | 1–0 | 2–0 | Friendly |
| 2. | 9 November 2013 | Al Nahyan Stadium, Abu Dhabi, United Arab Emirates | Philippines | 1–0 | 4–0 | Friendly |
| 3. | 15 November 2013 | Zayed Sports City Stadium, Abu Dhabi, United Arab Emirates | Hong Kong | 1–0 | 4–0 | 2015 AFC Asian Cup qualification |
| 4. | 18 March 2016 | Zayed Sports City Stadium, Abu Dhabi, United Arab Emirates | Bangladesh | 4–1 | 6–1 | Friendly |
| 5. | 18 March 2016 | Zayed Sports City Stadium, Abu Dhabi, United Arab Emirates | Bangladesh | 5–1 | 6–1 | Friendly |
