= Hussain Abdulrahman =

Emirati association football player (born 1994)

Personal information
- Date of birth: 31 October 1994 (age 32)
- Place of birth: Emirates
- Height: 1.70 m (5 ft 7 in)
- Position: Midfielder

Youth career
- 2009–2013: Dubai

Senior career*
Years	Team	Apps	(Gls)
2013–2017	Dubai		
2017–2024	Ajman	85	(6)
2024–2025	Al Jazirah Al-Hamra		
- * Club domestic league appearances and goals

Hussain Abdulrahman (Arabic: حُسَيْن عَبْد الرَّحْمٰن حَسَن الْجَفْرِيّ; born 31 October 1994) is an Emirati footballer who plays as a midfielder.

== Career ==
=== Dubai ===
Hussain Abdulrahman started his career at Dubai and is a product of the Dubai's youth system. On 10 May 2014, Hussain Abdulrahman made his professional debut for Dubai against Al-Nasr in the Pro League, replacing Jehad Al-Hussain.

=== Ajman ===
On 17 August 2017, left Dubai and signed with Ajman. On 15 September 2017, Hussain Abdulrahman made his professional debut for Ajman against Al-Jazira in the Pro League.
