= Ajman Stadium =

Football stadium in Ajman, United Arab Emirates

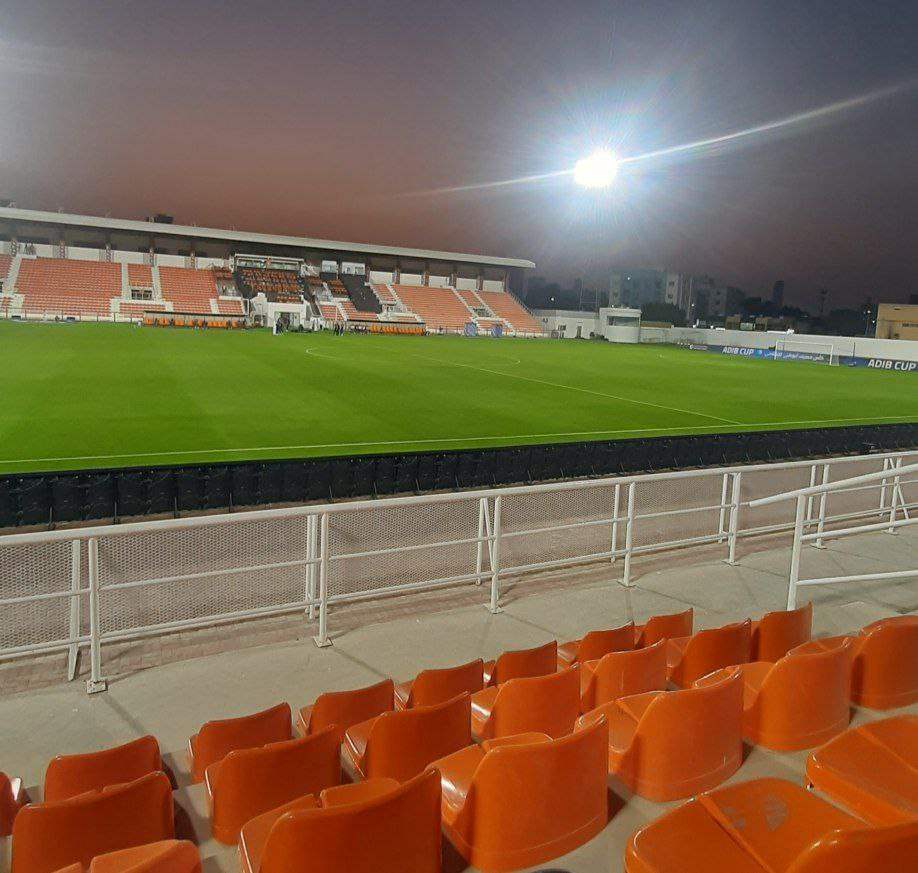
- Interactive map of Ajman Stadium
- Full name: Sheikh Rashid Bin Saeed Stadium
- Address: Sheikh Khalifa street - Al Rashidiya 2, Ajman
- Capacity: 5,141

Construction
- Opened: 1974; 52 years ago

Sheikh Rashid Bin Saeed Stadium, also known as Ajman Stadium, is a football stadium in Ajman. It is the home of association football club Ajman Club and has a capacity of 5,141.

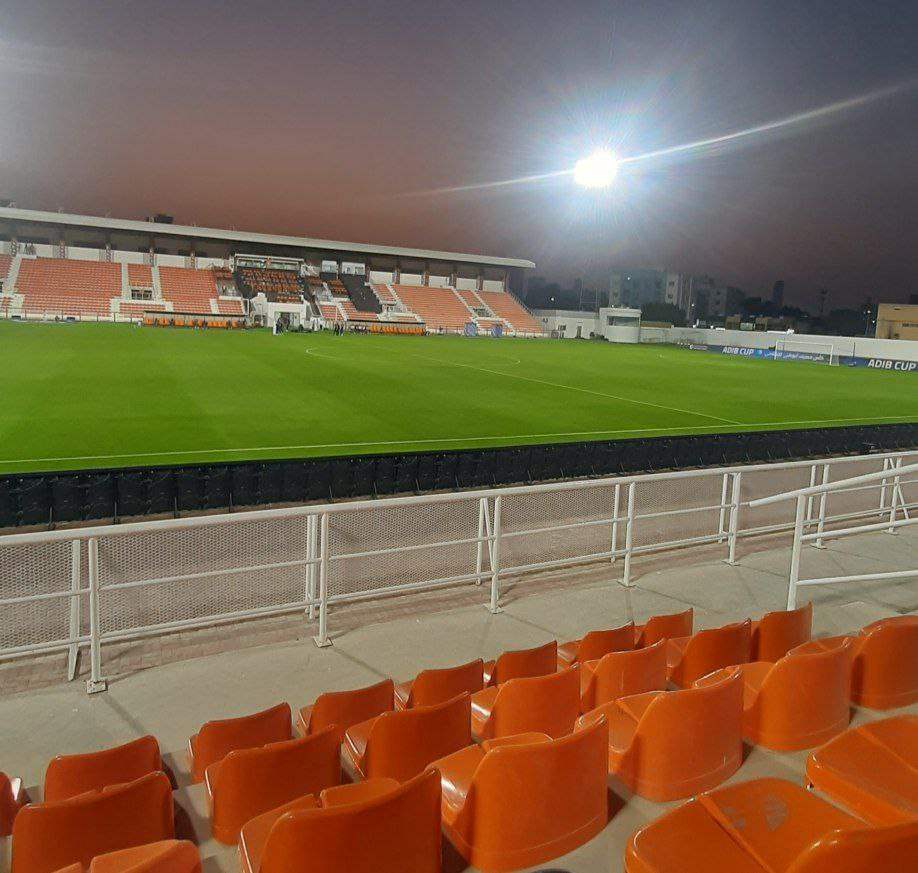
Ajman Stadium

The stadium was opened in 1974. It has 2 stands, one of which is covered.
