= Tareq Ahmed (footballer) =

Emirati footballer (born 1988)

Personal information
- Full name: Tareq Ahmed Mohammad Hassan Al Hammadi
- Date of birth: 12 March 1988 (age 38)
- Place of birth: Dibba Al-Hisn, United Arab Emirates
- Height: 1.86 m (6 ft 1 in)
- Position: Midfielder

Team information
- Current team: Dubai United
- Number: 18

Youth career
- Sharjah

Senior career*
Years	Team	Apps	(Gls)
2008–2009	Sharjah		
2009–2011	Al Jazira		
2011–2013	Al Ahli	43	(1)
2013–2023	Al Nasr	203	(5)
2023–2024	Shabab Al Ahli	9	(0)
2024	→ Emirates (loan)	12	(0)
2024–2025	Dibba		
2025–	Dubai United		

International career
2016–2019	United Arab Emirates	17	(2)
- * Club domestic league appearances and goals

Tareq Ahmed (Arabic: طارق أحمد; born 12 March 1988) is an Emirati footballer. He currently plays as a midfielder for Dubai United.

== International career ==
=== International goals ===
Scores and results list the United Arab Emirates' goal tally first.

No.	Date	Venue	Opponent	Score	Result	Competition
1.	7 June 2017	Shah Alam Stadium, Shah Alam, Malaysia	Laos	4–0	4–0	Friendly
2.	10 October 2019	Al Maktoum Stadium, Dubai, United Arab Emirates	Indonesia	5–0	5–0	2022 FIFA World Cup qualification

== Honours ==
- UAE President's Cup: 2014–15
- UAE League Cup: 2019–20
