= Bakare Kone =

Ivorian footballer

Personal information
- Full name: Bakare Kone
- Date of birth: 15 April 1989 (age 37)
- Place of birth: Bouake, Ivory Coast
- Height: 5 ft 7 in (1.70 m)
- Position: Midfielder

Team information
- Current team: ASEC Mimosas
- Number: 7

Senior career*
Years	Team	Apps	(Gls)
2008–2011	ASEC Mimosas		
2011–2016	Wydad Casablanca	106	(17)
2015–2016	→ Dibba Al-Fujairah (loan)	24	(7)
2016–2017	Kalba Club	25	(2)
2017–2018	Ajman Club	20	(1)
2018–2019	Emirates Club	10	(0)
2019–2020	Al-Hamriyah		
2020	Al-Arabi		
- * Club domestic league appearances and goals

Bakare Kone (born April 15, 1989) is an Ivorian professional footballer who plays as an attacking midfielder for ASEC Mimosas.
