= Al Dhafra Stadium =

Stadium in Madinat Zayed, United Arab Emirates

Sheikh Hamdan Bin Zayed Stadium is a multi-use stadium in Madinat Zayed, United Arab Emirates. It is currently used mostly for football matches and is the home ground of Dhafra. It holds 5,167 people.

Stadium was opened in 2006.
