= Mohamed Al-Akbari =

Emirati footballer (born 1996)

Personal information
- Full name: Mohamed Salman Abdulla Salman Al-Akbari
- Date of birth: 15 March 1996 (age 30)
- Place of birth: Abu Dhabi, United Arab Emirates
- Position: Forward

Senior career*
Years	Team	Apps	(Gls)
2013–2018	Al Wahda	67	(15)
2018–2020	Al Nasr	21	(4)
2020–2022	Al Wasl	17	(3)

International career^{‡}
2013	United Arab Emirates U17	3	(0)
2014	United Arab Emirates U19	4	(1)
2016	United Arab Emirates U23	3	(1)
2015–	United Arab Emirates	6	(1)
- * Club domestic league appearances and goals as of 06:47, 21 January 2016 (UTC) ‡ National team caps and goals as of 06:47, 15 May 2018 (UTC)

Mohamed Al-Akbari (born 15 March 1996) is an Emirati football player who plays as a forward.

== International career ==
=== International goals ===
Scores and results list United Arab Emirates' goal tally first.

No	Date	Venue	Opponent	Score	Result	Competition
1.	28 August 2015	Zayed Sports City Stadium, Abu Dhabi, United Arab Emirates	Myanmar	1–0	1–0	Friendly

== Honours ==
Al-Wahda

Runner-up

- UAE Pro-League: 2013–14
