= Fujairah Club Stadium =

Stadium in the United Arab Emirates

- ستاد نادي فجيرة
- Fujairah Stadium
- Interactive map of Fujairah Club Stadium
- Location: Fujairah, United Arab Emirates
- Coordinates: 25°07′48″N 56°20′37″E
- Owner: Fujairah FC
- Operator: Fujairah FC
- Capacity: 10,638
- Type: Stadium
- Current use: Football matches

Construction
- Opened: May 1st, 1986
- Renovated: 1993; 1995; 2015

Tenants
- Fujairah; Dibba Al Fujairah (2012–2013, 2015–2019); Al Urooba (2021–2022)

Fujairah Stadium is a multi-use stadium located in Fujairah, United Arab Emirates. It is currently used mostly for football matches and is the home ground of Fujairah SC. The stadium holds 10,645 people. The stadium was opened on May 1st, 1986 and renovated in 1993, 1995 and 2015.
