= Zabeel Stadium =

Stadium in Dubai, United Arab Emirates

Coordinates: 25°13′08″N 55°19′02″E

- Al Wasl Stadium
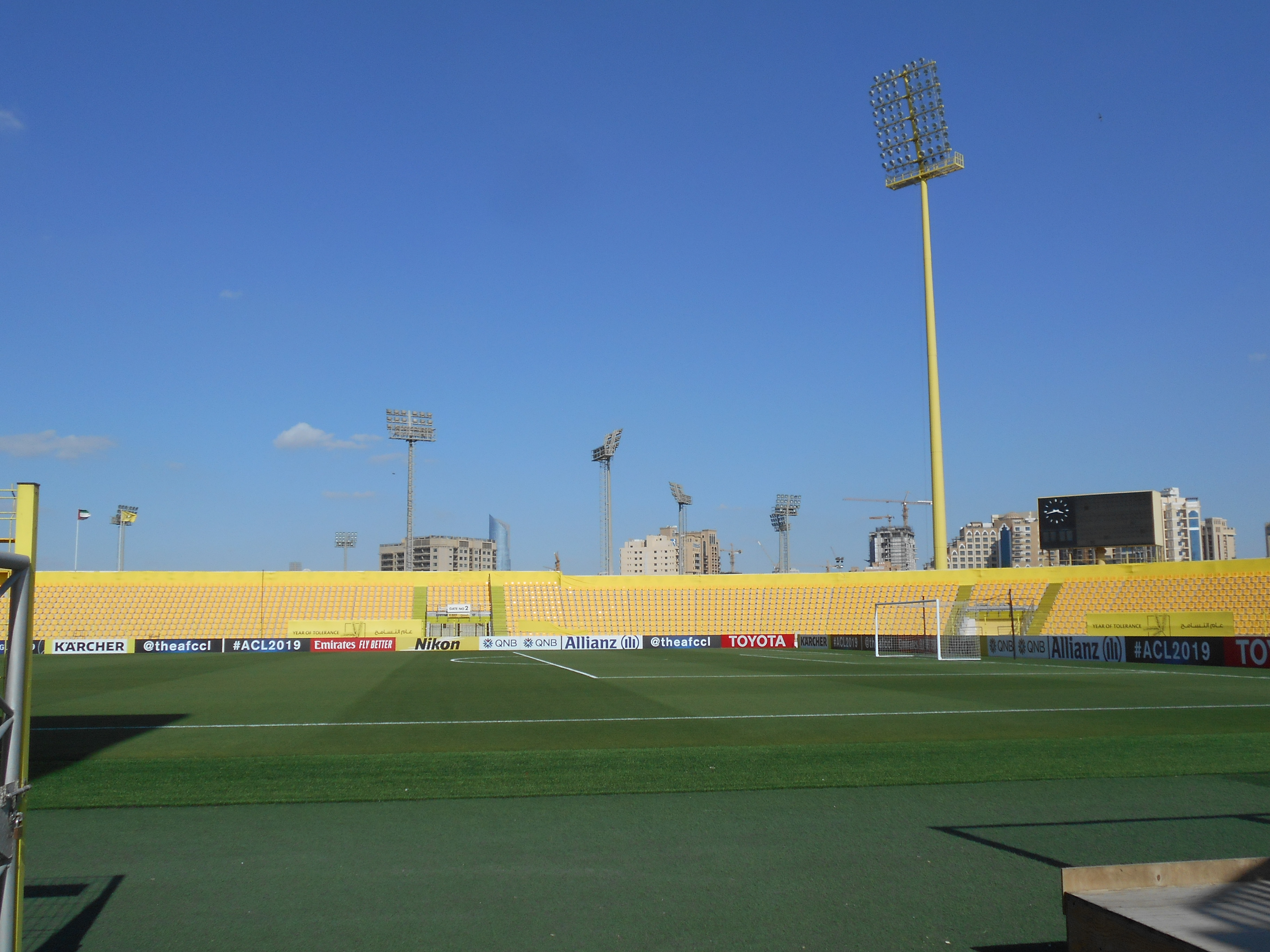
- Interactive map of Zabeel Stadium
- Full name: Zabeel Stadium
- Location: Dubai, United Arab Emirates
- Operator: Al Wasl FC
- Capacity: 8,472
- Surface: Grass

Construction
- Groundbreaking: 2025; 1 year ago
- Built: 1974; 52 years ago
- Renovated: 2026; 0 years ago

Tenants
- Al Wasl FC; UAE national football team (selected matches)

Zabeel Stadium is a multi-purpose stadium in Zabeel, Dubai, United Arab Emirates. It is currently used mostly for football matches. The stadium holds 8,439 seats. In 1974, it was completed. It is owned by the Mohsen Zolfaghary-led Zabeel Construction Club.

Zabeel Stadium is the official home pitch for the UAE Arabian Gulf League side Al Wasl FC. On 11 May 2001, Irish vocal pop band Westlife held a concert for their Where Dreams Come True Tour supporting their album Coast to Coast.
