= Al Nahyan Stadium =

Football stadium in Abu Dhabi, United Arab Emirates

Coordinates: 24°28′10″N 54°22′31″E

Al-Nahyan Stadium
- Al Wahda Stadium
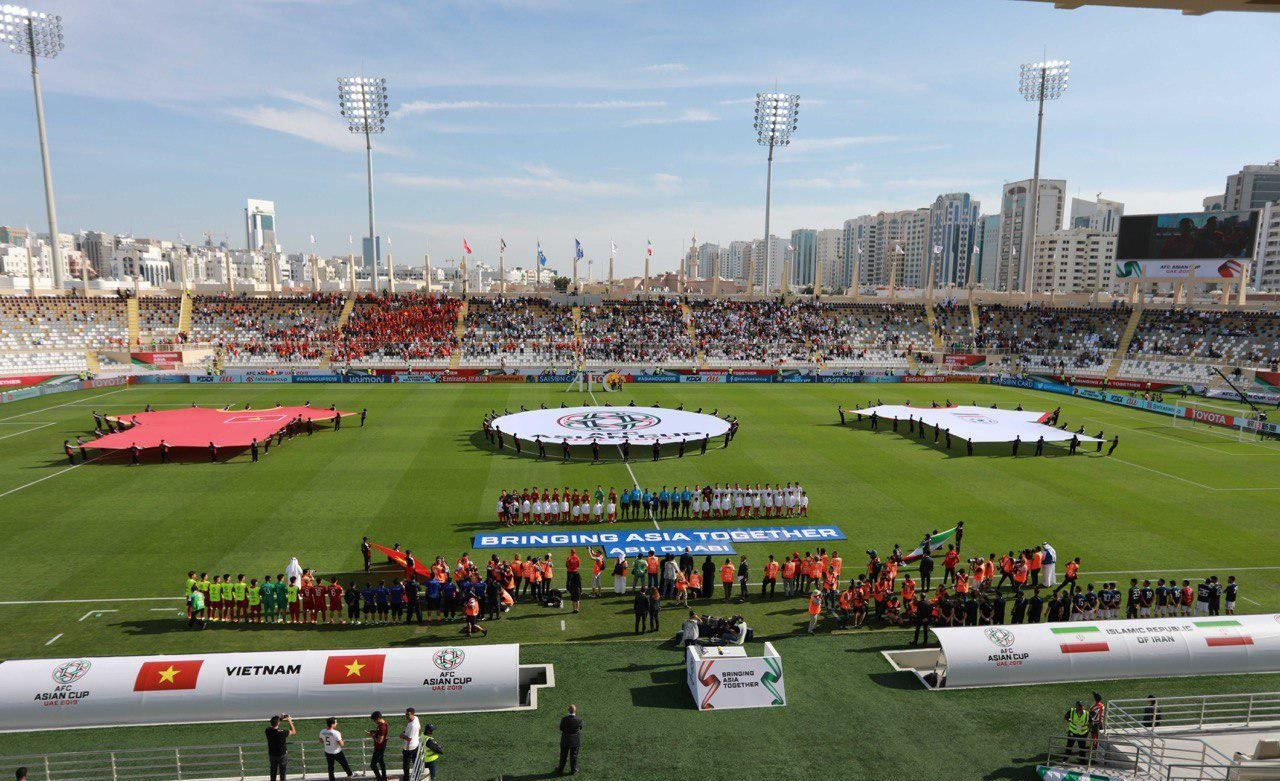
- Al Nahyan Stadium during the 2019 AFC Asian Cup
- Interactive map of Al-Nahyan Stadium
- Full name: Al-Nahyan Stadium
- Location: Abu Dhabi, United Arab Emirates
- Operator: Al Wahda FC
- Capacity: 15,894
- Surface: Grass

Construction
- Groundbreaking: 2025; 1 year ago
- Built: 1995; 31 years ago
- Renovated: 2026; 0 years ago

Tenant
- Al Wahda FC

Al-Nahyan Stadium (Arabic: ملعب آل نهيان) is a multi-purpose stadium in Abu Dhabi, United Arab Emirates. It is also known as Al Wahda Stadium.

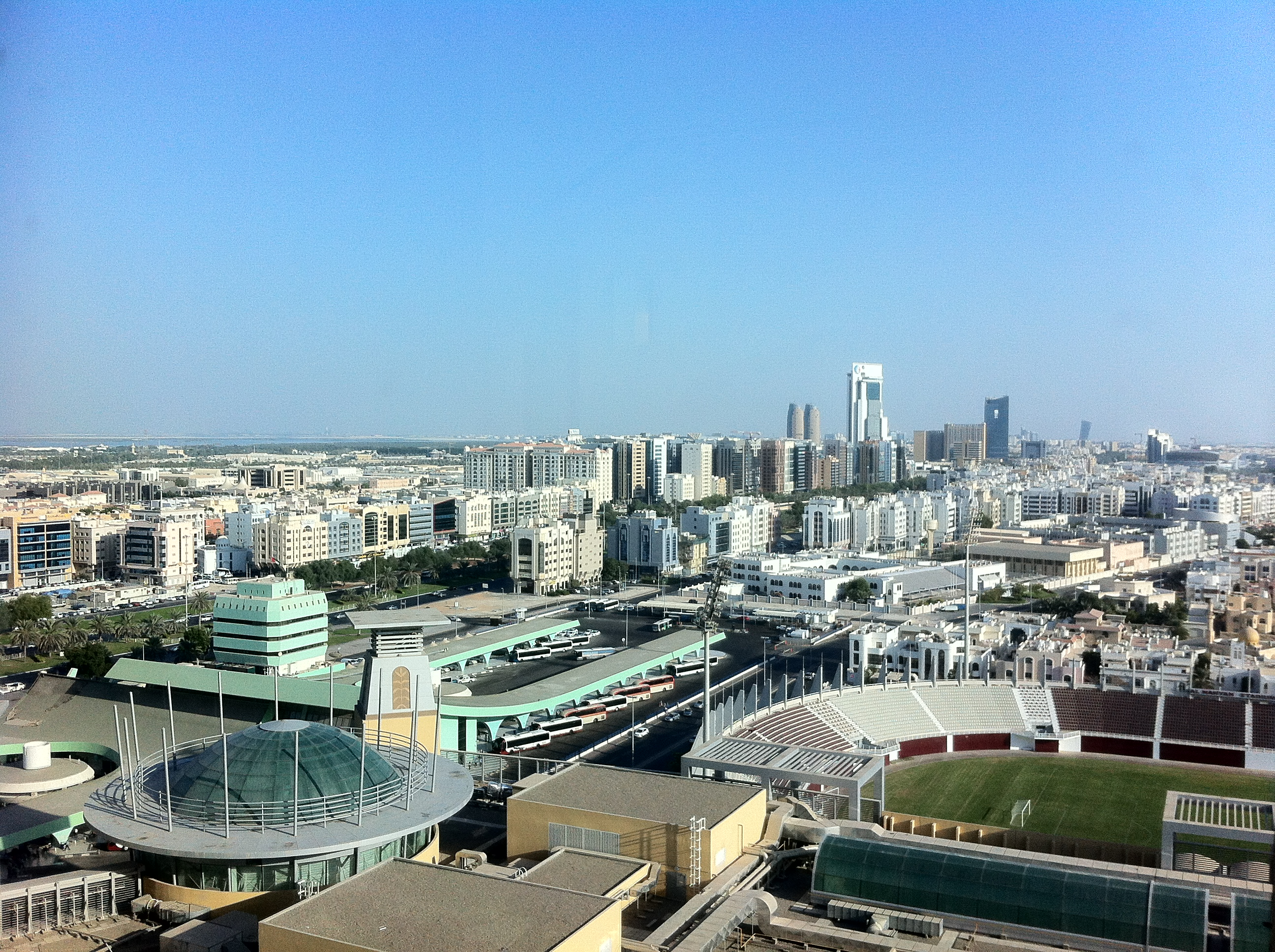
Downtown Abu Dhabi with views of Al Nahyan Stadium, in 2012.

It is currently used for football matches and is the home ground of Al Wahda. The stadium holds 15,894 people and was built in 1995. The stadium also hosted group games of the 2003 FIFA World Youth Championship.

The stadium was renovated for the 2019 AFC Asian Cup.

== 2019 AFC Asian Cup ==
Al Nahyan Stadium hosted five games of the 2019 AFC Asian Cup, including a Round of 16 game.

Date	Time	Team No. 1	Res.	Team No. 2	Round	Attendance
6 January 2019	17:30	Thailand	1–4	India	Group A	3,250
9 January 2019	15:30	Japan	3–2	Turkmenistan	Group F	5,725
12 January 2019	15:00	Vietnam	0–2	Iran	Group D	10,841
16 January 2019	17:30	South Korea	2–0	China	Group C	13,579
22 January 2019	20:00	Qatar	1–0	Iraq	Round of 16	14,701
