= 2011–12 Al Wasl FC season =

Al Wasl FC
2011–12 season
- Manager: (Argentina) Diego Maradona
- Stadium: Zabeel Stadium
- Pro-League: 8th
Home colours	Away colours

== Squad ==
Note: Flags indicate national team as defined under FIFA eligibility rules; some limited exceptions apply. Players may hold more than one non-FIFA nationality.

No.	Pos.	Nation	Player
1	GK	UAE	Rashid AlSuwaidi
3	MF	UAE	Hassan Ali
4	MF	UAE	Humaid Bin Lahej
5	DF	UAE	Fahad Masood
6	DF	UAE	Waheed Ismail
7	MF	UAE	Eissa Ali (Captain)
8	MF	ARG	Mariano Donda
9	DF	UAE	Tariq Hassan
11	MF	UAE	Khalifa bin Lahej
12	GK	UAE	Ali Hassan Al Amir
13	DF	UAE	Darwish Ahmed
15	GK	UAE	Ahmed Mahmoud
16	MF	UAE	Obaid Nasser
17	MF	UAE	Abdulrahman Yousif
18	MF	ARG	Juan Ignacio Mercier
19	FW	URU	Juan Manuel Olivera

No.	Pos.	Nation	Player
21	FW	UAE	Hamad AlHosani
23	MF	UAE	Mohammed Jamal
24	FW	UAE	Rashid Eissa
27	DF	UAE	Mubarak Hassan
29	DF	UAE	Yasser Salem
32	FW	UAE	Ammar Mubarak
33	MF	UAE	Saud Suhail
55	GK	UAE	Majed Nasser
60	DF	UAE	Jaber Abdalla Assad
70	FW	UAE	Mahir Jasem
77	FW	UAE	Hassan Yousif
80	FW	UAE	Abdulla Abdulrahman
90	FW	IRI	Mohammad Reza Khalatbari
92	MF	UAE	Khalifa Abdullah
93	MF	UAE	Sultan Rashid
99	MF	UAE	Fahad Hadeed

== Current technical staff ==
Position	Staff
Head Coach	(Argentina) Diego Maradona
Vice Coach	(Argentina) Hector Enrique
Assistant Coach	(United Arab Emirates) Ali Hassan
Assistant Coach	(Argentina) Roberto Trotta
Fitness Coach	(Argentina) Xavier Vilamitjana
Goalkeepers Coach	(Algeria) Yacine Bentaala
Team Manager	(United Arab Emirates) Humaid Yousuf
Team Doctor	(Serbia) Dr. Dejan Jovanovic
Physiotherapist	(Spain) Jon Abrego
Physiotherapist	(Brazil) Leandro Yoshinada Suzuki
Masseur	(Egypt) Mohammad Saad

Source: TheNational.ae

== Transfers ==
=== In ===
Name	Nat	Moving from	Fee
Ali Rabeea	(United Arab Emirates)	(United Arab Emirates) Emirates Club	Free transfer
Edson Puch	(Chile)	Club Universidad de Chile	$4million
Mubarak Hassan	(United Arab Emirates)	(United Arab Emirates) Fujairah Club	AED7million
Coach Diego Maradona	(Argentina)	Free agent	$4million
Hamad AlHosani	(United Arab Emirates)	(United Arab Emirates) Al Dhafra S.C.C.	Undisclosed
Fahad Masood	(United Arab Emirates)	(United Arab Emirates) Al Wahda S.C.C.	Loan
Hassan Ali	(United Arab Emirates)	(United Arab Emirates) Al-Ahli Dubai	Undisclosed
Juan Manuel Olivera	(Uruguay)	(Uruguay) C.A. Peñarol	Undisclosed
Ahmed Mahmoud	(United Arab Emirates)	(United Arab Emirates) Al Shabab Club	Undisclosed
Mariano Donda	(Argentina)	(Argentina) Godoy Cruz	Undisclosed
Abdulla Abdulrahman	(United Arab Emirates)	(United Arab Emirates) Al-Ahli Dubai	Loan
Richard Porta	(Australia)	(Uruguay) Nacional	Loan
Fahad Hadeed	(United Arab Emirates)	(United Arab Emirates) Al Sharjah SC	Free
Mohammad Reza Khalatbari	(Iran)	(Qatar) Al Gharafa Sports Club	$1milion
Juan Ignacio Mercier	(Argentina)	(Saudi Arabia) Al Nassr FC	Free
Jaber Abdalla Assad	(United Arab Emirates)	(United Arab Emirates) Al-Shaab (UAE)	Loan
Sultan Rashid	(United Arab Emirates)	(United Arab Emirates) Dibba Al-Fujairah Club	Free transfer

=== Out ===
Name	Nat	Moving To	Fee
Coach Khalifa Mobarak	(United Arab Emirates)	(United Arab Emirates) Al Wasl FC	End of Interim Contract
Khalaf Ismail	(United Arab Emirates)	(United Arab Emirates) Ajman Club	Free transfer
Saeed Al Kass	(United Arab Emirates)	(United Arab Emirates) Al Sharjah SC	End of Contract
Mohammad Omar	(United Arab Emirates)	Retired	
Ali Mahmoud	(United Arab Emirates)	(United Arab Emirates) Baniyas SC	Free transfer
Alexandre Oliveira	(Brazil)	(Brazil) Botafogo	Free transfer
Alex Pires de Souza	(Brazil)	(Portugal) U.D. Leiria	Free transfer
Francisco Yeste	(Spain)	(Greece) Olympiacos F.C.	Undisclosed
Omran Abdul Rahman	(United Arab Emirates)	(United Arab Emirates) Al Sharjah SC	Free transfer
Faisal Ahmed	(United Arab Emirates)	(United Arab Emirates) Emirates Club	Free transfer
Khalid Darwish	(United Arab Emirates)	(United Arab Emirates) Emirates Club	Free transfer
Mohammed Al Balushi	(Oman)	(United Arab Emirates) Al Wahda S.C.C.	Loan
Ali Rabeea	(United Arab Emirates)	(United Arab Emirates) Emirates Club	Loan
Edson Puch	(Chile)	(Chile) Deportes Iquique	Loan
Fadel Ahmad	(United Arab Emirates)	(United Arab Emirates) Al Nasr SC	Loan
Richard Porta	(Australia)	(Uruguay) Nacional	Loan return

For Last Season's Transfers List Please visit 2010–11 Al Wasl F.C. season

== Tournaments ==
=== Pre-Season Matches & Friendlies ===
==== Local Camp ====
Al Wasl has abandoned its annual habit of traveling to Europe for summer pre-season training camp as per the instructions of coach Diego Maradona. The new coach decided to set up camp at home as it clashes with the Holy Month of Ramadan where all the players would be fasting during the day, making it difficult to set up an external training camp. The Internal camp included two matches against lower division clubs only.

==== Results ====
Kickoff times are in UAE Time (GMT+4).

Win Draw Loss

28 August 2011 Friendly	Al Wasl FC	3–1	(United Arab Emirates) Ittihad Kalba	Zabeel Stadium, Dubai, United Arab Emirates
22:00	J. Olivera 32'; Mohammed Jamal 88'; Hassan Yousif 90',		Yasser Salem 40' (o.g.)	Referee: (United Arab Emirates) Ali Hamad

8 September 2011 Friendly	Al Wasl FC	1–2	(United Arab Emirates) Dibba Al-Fujairah Club	Zabeel Stadium, Dubai, United Arab Emirates
19:30	Darweesh Ahmad 60'		Paulo Junior 40'; Paulo Junior 90'	Referee: (United Arab Emirates) Ibrahim Al Muhairi

==== Top Scorers ====
Player	Goals
(Uruguay) Juan Manuel Olivera	1
(United Arab Emirates) Mohammed Jamal	1
(United Arab Emirates) Hassan Yousif	1
(United Arab Emirates) Darweesh Ahmad	1

=== UAE Pro League 2011–12 ===
==== Standing ====
Overall								Home						Away					
Pld	W	D	L	GF	GA	GD	Pts	W	D	L	GF	GA	GD	W	D	L	GF	GA	GD
22	7	5	10	32	40	−8	26	3	3	5	19	22	−3	4	2	5	13	18	−5

Last updated: 2 May.
Source: #UAE Pro League 2011-12

==== Results by round ====
Round	1	2	3	4	5	6	7	8	9	10	11	12	13	14	15	16	17	18	19	20	21	22
Ground	H	A	H	A	A	H	A	H	A	H	A	A	H	A	H	H	A	H	A	H	A	H
Result	W	W	D	L	W	D	L	D	L	L	W	W	W	L	L	W	L	D	D	L	L	L
Position	2	1	2	2	2	2	6	6	6	7	6	5	5	5	6	5	5	6	7	8	8	8

Updated to match(es) played on 2 May 2012. Source: League Matches
A = Away; H = Home; W = Win; D = Draw; L = Loss

==== Results ====
Kickoff times are in UAE Time (GMT+4).

Win Draw Loss

16 October 2011 round 1	Al Wasl	3–0	Al Sharjah SC	Zabeel Stadium, Dubai
21:00	J. Olivera 15' (pen.), 55', 70'			Referee: (United Arab Emirates) Abdulla Al Ajel

22 October 2011 round 2	Baniyas SC	1–2	Al Wasl	Baniyas Stadium, Al Shamkha
21:00	Amer Abdulrahman 50'		Darweesh Ahmad 07'; J. Olivera 9'	Attendance: 3357; Referee: (United Arab Emirates) Mohammad Abdullah Hassan

28 October 2011 round 3	Ajman Club	1–1	Al Wasl	Ajman Stadium, Ajman
16:55	Ibrahima Touré 24'		Rashid Eissa 10'	Referee: (United Arab Emirates) Fahad AlKassar

2 November 2011 round 4	Al Wasl	0–1	Al Jazira Club	Zabeel Stadium, Dubai
20:00			Matías Emilio Delgado 54'	Attendance: 10031; Referee: (United Arab Emirates) Hamad AlShaikh

25 November 2011 round 5	Emirates Club	1–2	Al Wasl	Emirates Club Stadium, Ras al-Khaimah
16:40	Pejman Nouri 28'		Waheed Ismail 45'; Edson Puch 89'	Referee: (United Arab Emirates) Mohammad Abdullah Hassan

3 December 2011 round 6	Al Wasl	2–2	Al Shabab	Zabeel Stadium, Dubai
20:00	Darweesh Ahmad 39'; Richard Porta 82'		Walid Abbas 19'; Ciel 48'	Referee: (United Arab Emirates) Ammar AlJonaibi

10 December 2011 round 7	Al Ain S.C.C.	2–0	Al Wasl	Sheikh Khalifa International Stadium, Al Ain
20:00	Asamoah Gyan 11' (pen.); Ignacio Scocco 37'			Attendance: 7432; Referee: (United Arab Emirates) Hamad AlShaikh

23 December 2011 round 8	Al Wasl	2–2	Al Nasr SC	Zabeel Stadium, Dubai
20:00	Mariano Donda 43'; Darweesh Ahmad 60'		Careca 06'; Léo Lima 90+6' (pen.)	Attendance: 8921; Referee: (United Arab Emirates) Mohammad Abdullah Hassan

30 December 2011 round 9	Al Wahda S.C.C.	2–1	Al Wasl	Al Nahyan Stadium, Abu Dhabi
20:00	Fernando Baiano 22'; Hugo 80'		Juan Manuel Olivera 73'	Referee: (United Arab Emirates) Hamad AlShaikh

5 January 2012 round 10	Al Wasl	1–2	Dubai C.S.C.	Maktoum Bin Rashid Al Maktoum Stadium, Dubai
17:00	Juan Manuel Olivera 24'		Aboubacar Camara 21'; Abbas Atwi 35'	Attendance: 1613; Referee: (United Arab Emirates) AbdulWahid Khater

14 January 2012 round 11	Al-Ahli Dubai	1–2	Al Wasl	Rashed Stadium, Dubai
20:00	Grafite 37'		Mariano Donda 78' (pen.); Juan Manuel Olivera 84'	Referee: (United Arab Emirates) Hamad AlShaikh

23 January 2012 round 12	Al Sharjah SC	1–2	Al Wasl	Sharjah Stadium, Sharjah
17:10	Marcelinho 07'		Mohammad Reza Khalatbari 16'; Juan Manuel Olivera 63'	Referee: (United Arab Emirates) Ibrahim Al Muhairi

9 February 2012 round 13	Al Wasl	1–0	Baniyas SC	Zabeel Stadium, Dubai
20:00	Juan Manuel Olivera 18'			Referee: (United Arab Emirates) Hamad AlShaikh

15 February 2012 round 14	Al Wasl	2–4	Ajman Club	Zabeel Stadium, Dubai
20:15	Juan Manuel Olivera 6'; Juan Manuel Olivera 78' (pen.)		Boris Kabi 20'; Boris Kabi 24'; Olivier Tia 57'; Waleed Ahmed Hassan 78'	Attendance: 2913; Referee: (United Arab Emirates) AbdulWahid Khater

15 March 2012 round 15	Al Jazira Club	1–0	Al Wasl	Mohammed Bin Zayed Stadium, Abu Dhabi
20:30	Ricardo Oliveira 85'			Attendance: 3205; Referee: (United Arab Emirates) Mohammad Abdullah Hassan

24 March 2012 round 16	Al Wasl	4–1	Emirates Club	Ajman Stadium, Ajman
17:45	Rashid Eissa 24'; Mariano Donda 32' (pen.); Juan Manuel Olivera 57'; Rashid Eissa 65'		Haitham Matroushi 66'	Attendance: 2017; Referee: (United Arab Emirates) Adel Al Naqbi

29 March 2012 round 17	Al Shabab	2–0	Al Wasl	Maktoum Bin Rashid Al Maktoum Stadium, Dubai
20:30	Mohammed Marzooq 44'; Ciel 87'			Attendance: 2500; Referee: (United Arab Emirates) Yaqoub Al-Hammadi

14 April 2012 round 18	Al Wasl	2–2	Al Ain S.C.C.	Zabeel Stadium, Dubai
20:30	Mohammad Reza Khalatbari 65'; Juan Manuel Olivera 67'		Asamoah Gyan 36'; Asamoah Gyan 84' (pen.)	Attendance: 10942; Referee: (United Arab Emirates) Mohamed Abdulla Hassan

26 April 2012 round 19	Al Nasr SC	1–1	Al Wasl	Al-Maktoum Stadium, Dubai
21:00	Léo Lima 32'		Waheed Ismail 7'	Attendance: 6870; Referee: (United Arab Emirates) Ammar AlJonaibi

6 May 2012 round 20	Al Wasl	0–2	Al Wahda S.C.C.	Al-Maktoum Stadium, Dubai
19:35			Hugo 40'; Saeed Al Kathiri 90+2'	Attendance: 342; Referee: (United Arab Emirates) AbdulWahid Khater

11 May 2012 round 21	Dubai C.S.C.	5–2	Al Wasl	Dubai Club Stadium, Dubai
19:40	Hassan Mohamed Taher 27'; Ali Hassan (footballer) 60'; Hassan Abdelrahman 69'; Hassan Mohamed Taher 87'; Nicolas Marin 89'		Mohammad Reza Khalatbari 45+1'; Rashid Eissa 82'	Attendance: 2175; Referee: (United Arab Emirates) Ali Hamad

26 May 2012 round 22	Al Wasl	2–6	Al-Ahli Dubai	Al-Maktoum Stadium, Dubai
19:45	Sultan Rashid 5'; Ammar Mubarak 34'		Luis Antonio Jiménez 20'; Youssef Mohamad 25'; Luis Antonio Jiménez 45'; Grafite 54'; Luis Antonio Jiménez 56'; Ismail Al Hammadi 69'	Attendance: 508; Referee: (United Arab Emirates) Abdulla Al Harthi

==== Top Scorers ====
Player	Goals
(Uruguay) Juan Manuel Olivera	13
(United Arab Emirates) Rashid Eissa	4
(United Arab Emirates) Darweesh Ahmad	3
(Argentina) Mariano Donda	3
(Iran) Mohammad Reza Khalatbari	3
(United Arab Emirates) Waheed Ismail	2
(Chile) Edson Puch	1
(Australia) Richard Porta	1
(United Arab Emirates) Sultan Rashid	1
(United Arab Emirates) Ammar Mubarak	1

=== 2012 GCC Champions League ===
Al Wasl FC is back to this regional competition after 2 years of winning it in the 2010 Tournament. This time Al Wasl enters after losing its chances in winning the 2011–12 UAE Pro-League and the 2011–12 UAE President's Cup, which makes the 2012 GCC Champions League a good opportunity to salvage its current season.

==== Standing ====
Team	Rnk	Pld	W	D	L	GF	GA	GD	Pts
(United Arab Emirates) Al Wasl FC	1	4	4	0	0	11	4	+7	12

==== Results ====
6 March 2012 Round 1	Al Nahda Club (Oman)	0–2	(United Arab Emirates) Al Wasl	Sultan Qaboos Sports Complex, Muscat, Oman
19:00			Mubarak Hassan 17'; Juan Manuel Olivera 47'	Referee: (Bahrain) Rami Alkaabi

20 March 2012 Round 2	Al Wasl (United Arab Emirates)	3–1	(Bahrain) Riffa S.C.	Zabeel Stadium, Dubai
20:30	Mariano Donda 10'; Rashid Eissa 26'; Juan Manuel Olivera 35'		Talal Yousef 53'	Referee: (Kuwait) Waleed Al Shatti

4 April 2012 Round 3	Riffa S.C. (Bahrain)	0–2	(United Arab Emirates) Al Wasl	Bahrain National Stadium, Riffa
19:45			Mariano Donda 24'; Fahad Hadeed 68'	Referee: (Qatar) Abdulrahman Abdou

1 May 2012 Round 4	Al Wasl (United Arab Emirates)	4–3	(Oman) Al Nahda Club	Zabeel Stadium, Dubai
20:45	Mohammad Reza Khalatbari 28'; Yasser Salem 48'; Juan Manuel Olivera 53'; Mariano Donda 75' (pen.)		Badr Al Jabri 6'; Wilfred da 55'; Wilfred da 92'	Referee: (Kuwait) Ali Mahmoud

15 May 2012 Quarter-finals	Al Wasl (United Arab Emirates)	1–1 (a.e.t.) (5–3 p)	(United Arab Emirates) Al Wahda S.C.C.	Zabeel Stadium, Dubai
19:40	Juan Manuel Olivera 112'		Fernando Baiano 114'	Referee: (Kuwait) Waleed Al Shatti
	Penalties
	Juan Manuel Olivera (penalty scored); Mariano Donda (penalty scored); Yasser Salem (penalty scored); Eissa Ali (penalty scored); Mohammad Reza Khalatbari (penalty scored)		Fernando Baiano (penalty scored); Eisa Al Marzouqi (penalty missed); Saeed Al Kathiri (penalty scored); Omar Ali (penalty scored)

23 May 2012 Semi-Finals Leg1	Al Wasl (United Arab Emirates)	3–0	(Qatar) Al-Khor Sports Club	Zabeel Stadium, Dubai
17:45	Juan Manuel Olivera 52'; Juan Manuel Olivera 69'; Eissa Ali 91'			Referee: (Oman) Abdullah Al Hilali

30 May 2012 Semi-Finals Leg1	Al-Khor Sports Club (Qatar)	2–1 (2–4 agg.)	(United Arab Emirates) Al Wasl	Al-Khawr Stadium, Al Khor
20:00	Reza Shanbeh 4'; Mohammed Al Alawi 85'		Mariano Donda 90'	Referee: (Bahrain) Ali Al Samahiji

5 June 2012 Final Leg1	Al-Muharraq SC (Bahrain)	1–3	(United Arab Emirates) Al Wasl	Bahrain National Stadium, Riffa
20:15	Husain Pele 49'		Eissa Ali 54'; Rashid Eissa 73'; Juan Manuel Olivera 85'	Referee: (Oman) Ahmed Alkaf

10 June 2012 Final Leg2	Al Wasl (United Arab Emirates)	1–3 (4–4 agg.) (4–5 p)	(Bahrain) Al-Muharraq SC	Zabeel Stadium, Dubai
19:50

==== Top Scorers ====
Player	Goals
(Uruguay) Juan Manuel Olivera	7
(Argentina) Mariano Donda	4
(United Arab Emirates) Rashid Eissa	2
(United Arab Emirates) Eissa Ali	2
(United Arab Emirates) Mubarak Hassan	1
(United Arab Emirates) Fahad Hadeed	1
(Iran) Mohammad Reza Khalatbari	1
(United Arab Emirates) Yasser Salem	1

=== UAE President's Cup 2011–12 ===
The President Cup's draw has put Al Wasl in a very difficult side of the elimination matrix. All the matches were considered early finals, starting with a match against Al-Ahli Dubai that ended with a historic 4–0 win for Al Wasl. The next match was set against Al Wahda S.C.C. which was behind the elimination of Al Wasl FC in the previous UAE President's Cup 2011–12. Al Wahda S.C.C. was able to eliminate Al Wasl FC again, sending them to a very early summer after losing the chance on competing in the only obtainable major trophy in the season after the team's position in the Pro League to 7th after losing to Dubai Club, few days from the Cup's Quarterfinals.

==== Results ====
Kickoff times are in UAE Time (GMT+4).

Win Draw Loss

18 December 2011 Round of 16	Al Wasl	4–0	Al-Ahli Dubai	Al-Maktoum Stadium, Dubai
20:00	J. Olivera 08'; Mariano Donda 44', 69' (pen.); Richard Porta 63'			Referee: (United Arab Emirates) Abdulla Al Ajel

10 January 2011 Quarter-finals	Al Wasl	2–3	Al Wahda S.C.C.	Tahnoun bin Mohammed Stadium, Al Ain
20:00	J. Olivera 47'; J. Olivera 90+2'		Fernando Baiano 49'; Mohammed Al Balushi 72'; Fernando Baiano 89'	Referee: (United Arab Emirates) Abdulla Al Ajel

==== Top Scorers ====
Player	Goals
(Uruguay) Juan Manuel Olivera	3
(Argentina) Mariano Donda	2
(Australia) Richard Porta	1

=== Etisalat Cup 2011–12 ===
The Etisalat Cup is a gap-filler between the official tournaments. It does not involve the International Players. It was the first tournament of the season, and the first ever official appearance for the Legendary Diego Maradona in the UAE as Al Wasl FC Coach. Al Wasl reached the Semifinal after a fierce group-round race, and then lost 0–1 in the Semifinal despite displaying a decent performance.

==== Standing ====
Team	Rnk	Pld	W	D	L	GF	GA	GD	Pts
(United Arab Emirates) Al Wasl FC	2	10	6	0	4	18	18	0	18

==== Results ====
15 September 2011 Round 1	Al Jazira Club	4–3	Al Wasl	Mohammed Bin Zayed Stadium, Abu Dhabi
20:30	Ibrahim Diaky 16' (pen.); Matías Delgado 29'; Ricardo Oliveira 35'; Baré 90+5',		Mariano Donda 25', 50' (pen.), 73'	Referee: (United Arab Emirates) Ali Hamad

22 September 2011 Round 2	Al Wasl	3–0	Emirates Club	Rashed Stadium, Dubai
17:30	Mariano Donda 46'; Eissa Ali 84', 90+1'			Referee: (United Arab Emirates) Ibrahim Al Muhairi

30 September 2011 Round 3	Al Wasl	3–0	Al Wahda S.C.C.	Zabeel Stadium, Dubai
20:30	J. Olivera 3'; Rashid Eissa 15'; Eissa Ali 90+1'			Referee: (United Arab Emirates) Mohammad Abdullah Hassan

8 October 2011 Round 4	Dubai Club	5–0	Al Wasl	Dubai Club Stadium, Al Aweer
18:45	Aboubacar M'Baye Camara 57'; Hassan Mohammad 71'; Simon Feindouno 76'; Nabil Daoudi 90'; Aboubacar M'Baye Camara 90+1',			Attendance: 2220; Referee: (United Arab Emirates) Ibrahim Al Muhairi

12 November 2011 Round 5	Al Wasl	1–0	Al Ain FC	Zabeel Stadium, Dubai
20:00	Juan Manuel Olivera 59'			Attendance: 2011; Referee: (United Arab Emirates) Abdulla Al Ajel

19 November 2011 Round 6	Al Ain FC	1–0	Al Wasl	Tahnoun bin Mohammed Stadium, Al Ain
21:00	Yasser Al-Qahtani 30'			Referee: (United Arab Emirates) Ammar AlJonaibi

28 January 2012 Round 7	Al Wasl	0–3	Dubai Club	Al-Maktoum Stadium, Dubai
17:15			Hassan Mohamed Taher 75'; Simon Feindouno 85'; Ali Hassan 87'	Attendance: 728; Referee: (United Arab Emirates) Abdulla Al Harthi

3 February 2012 Round 8	Al Wahda S.C.C.	1–2	Al Wasl	Al Nahyan Stadium, Abu Dhabi
18:50	Fernando Baiano 37'		Hamad AlHosani 63'; Eissa Ali 90+2'	Attendance: 876; Referee: (United Arab Emirates) Abdulla Al Ajel

23 February 2012 Round 9	Emirates Club	1–2	Al Wasl	Emirates Club Stadium, Ras al-Khaimah
19:05	Alexander Geynrikh 72'		Hasan Ali 20'; Juan Manuel Olivera 78'	Attendance: 1154; Referee: (United Arab Emirates) Yaseen Al Mansouri

2 March 2012 Round 10	Al Wasl	4–3	Al Jazira Club	Baniyas Stadium, Al Shamkha
19:05	Juan Ignacio Mercier 35'; Juan Manuel Olivera 43' (pen.); Tariq Hassan 72'; Mohammad Reza Khalatbari 76'		Ricardo Oliveira 18'; Bare 31'; Ibrahim Diaky 58'	Referee: (United Arab Emirates) Fahad AlKassar

11 March 2012 Semi Final	Al-Ahli Dubai	1–0	Al Wasl	Al-Rashid Stadium, Dubai
20:30	Faisal Khalil 61'			Referee: (United Arab Emirates) Yaqoub Qaseem

==== Top Scorers ====
Player	Goals
(Argentina) Mariano Donda	4
(United Arab Emirates) Eissa Ali	4
(Uruguay) Juan Manuel Olivera	4
(United Arab Emirates) Rashid Eissa	1
(United Arab Emirates) Hamad AlHosani	1
(United Arab Emirates) Hasan Ali	1
(Argentina) Juan Ignacio Mercier	1
(United Arab Emirates) Tariq Hassan	1
(Iran) Mohammad Reza Khalatbari	1

== Season Top scorers ==
Position	Nation	Number	Name	Friendlies	League	GCC Cup	President's Cup	Etisalat Cup	Total
1	(Uruguay)	19	Juan Manuel Olivera	1	13	7	3	4	28
2	(Argentina)	8	Mariano Donda	0	3	4	2	4	13
3	(United Arab Emirates)	24	Rashid Eissa	0	4	2	0	1	7
4	(United Arab Emirates)	7	Eissa Ali	0	0	2	0	4	6
5	(Iran)	90	Mohammad Reza Khalatbari	0	3	1	0	1	5
6	(United Arab Emirates)	13	Darweesh Ahmad	1	3	0	0	0	4
7	(United Arab Emirates)	6	Waheed Ismail	0	2	0	0	0	2
7	(Australia)	20	Richard Porta	0	1	0	1	0	2
9	(Chile)	18	Edson Puch	0	1	0	0	0	1
9	(United Arab Emirates)	93	Sultan Rashid	0	1	0	0	0	1
9	(United Arab Emirates)	32	Ammar Mubarak	0	1	0	0	0	1
9	(United Arab Emirates)	27	Mubarak Hassan	0	0	1	0	0	1
9	(United Arab Emirates)	99	Fahad Hadeed	0	0	1	0	0	1
9	(United Arab Emirates)	29	Yasser Salem	0	0	1	0	0	1
9	(United Arab Emirates)	21	Hamad AlHosani	0	0	0	0	1	1
9	(United Arab Emirates)	3	Hasan Ali Ibrahim	0	0	0	0	1	1
9	(Argentina)	18	Juan Ignacio Mercier	0	0	0	0	1	1
9	(United Arab Emirates)	9	Tariq Hassan	0	0	0	0	1	1
9	(United Arab Emirates)	23	Mohammed Jamal	1	0	0	0	0	1
9	(United Arab Emirates)	77	Hassan Yousif	1	0	0	0	0	1
Totals				4	32	19	6	18	79

Last updated on 6 June 2012

== Season Highlights ==
- By finishing 8th in the UAE Pro-League at the end of the season, Al Wasl has matched its all-time worst position in the League.
- Al Wasl's Goalkeeper Majed Nasser received a 17-match ban and been fined Dh30,000 (€6,200) after slapping Ahli Dubai's coach Quique Flores after the semi-final of the Etisalat Cup.
- Al Wasl was fined 5 times and received 3 Home Match ban punishments from the United Arab Emirates Football Association totaling 6 games.
- Al Wasl ended the first leg of the UAE Pro-League with a 5 match winning drought. It ended the second leg of the tournament with an even worse 6 matches winning drought.
- Al Wasl played Dubai Club, the recently promoted and relegation contender, 4 times in the 2011–2012 season. It lost them all (0–5, 1–2, 0–3, and 2–5), scoring 3 and conceding 15.

== Other Seasons ==
- 2008–09 Al Wasl FC season
- 2009–10 Al Wasl FC season
- 2010–11 Al Wasl FC season

== See also ==
- 2011–12 UAE Pro-League
- Al Wasl FC
- Al Wasl SC
