= 2012–13 UAE Pro League =

UAE Pro League
- Season: 2012–13
- Champions: Al Ain
- Relegated: Dibba Al Fujairah; Ittihad Kalba
- Champions League: Al Ain; Al Ahli; Al Jazira; Baniyas
- Gulf Champions League: Al Shabab; Al Nasr
- Matches: 90
- Goals: 330 (3.67 per match)
- Top goalscorer: Asamoah Gyan (31 goals)
- Highest attendance: 19,756 (Al-Jazira vs. Al-Ain)
- Lowest attendance: 103 (Ittihad Kalba vs. Dibba Al Fujairah)
- Average attendance: 2,468

The 2011–12 UAE Pro League (known as Etisalat Pro League for sponsorship reasons) was the 38th top-level football season in the UAE and the fifth Professional season. The season was contested by 14 teams due to an expansion in the league system.

Al Ain were the defending champions, having won the previous 2011–12 Pro League season.

On Thursday, 18 April 2013, Al Ain won their match against Dubai Club which guaranteed them as winners of the 2012–13 Pro League and retained their Pro League trophy. They received their trophy on their last match against Al Nasr on Saturday, 25 May 2013.

== Promotion ==
In June 2012, the UAE FA announced that the league would be expanded into 14 clubs. The two teams that came in the bottom two of the previous campaign – Sharjah and Emirates Club – would enter a promotion/relegation series with the teams that came third and fourth in the second level – Al Dhafra and Al Shaab. These playoff winners would join Ittihad Kalba and Dibba Al Fujairah who came in the top two in the second division.

=== Promotion/relegation play-offs ===
Pos	Team	Pld	W	D	L	GF	GA	GD	Pts	Promotion or relegation
1	Al Shaab	3	2	0	1	5	4	+1	6	Promotion to the 2012–13 UAE Pro-League
2	Al Dhafra	3	2	0	1	8	4	+4	6	Promotion to the 2012–13 UAE Pro-League
3	Sharjah	3	2	0	1	3	2	+1	6	Relegation to the 2012–13 UAE Second Division
4	Emirates	3	0	0	3	3	9	−6	0	Relegation to the 2012–13 UAE Second Division

Source: Full Standings
Rules for classification: 1) points; 2) goal difference; 3) number of goals scored.

== Teams ==
=== Stadia and locations ===
Locations of teams in the 2012–13 UAE Pro-League

Team	Home city	Manager	Stadium	Capacity
Ajman	Ajman	(Iraq) Abdul Wahab Abdul Qader	Ajman Stadium	10,000
Al Ahli	Dubai	(Spain) Quique Sánchez Flores	Rashed Stadium	18,000
Al Ain	Al Ain	(Romania) Cosmin Olăroiu	Tahnoun bin Mohammed Stadium	15,000
Al Dhafra	Madinat Zayed	(France) Laurent Banide	Hamdan bin Zayed Al Nahyan Stadium	12,000
Al Jazira	Abu Dhabi	(Spain) Luis Milla	Mohammed Bin Zayed Stadium	42,056
Al Nasr	Dubai	(Italy) Walter Zenga	Al-Maktoum Stadium	12,000
Al Shaab	Sharjah	(Romania) Marius Șumudică	Khalid Bin Mohammed Stadium	10,000
Al Shabab	Dubai	(Brazil) Marcos Paqueta	Maktoum Bin Rashid Al Maktoum Stadium	12,000
Al Wahda	Abu Dhabi	(Austria) Josef Hickersberger	Al-Nahyan Stadium	12,000
Al Wasl	Dubai	(United Arab Emirates) Eid Baroot	Zabeel Stadium	12,000
Baniyas	Abu Dhabi	(United Arab Emirates) Salem Al Orafi	Bani Yas Stadium	9,570
Dibba Al Fujairah	Fujairah	(United Arab Emirates) Abdullah Mesfer	Fujairah Club Stadium	3,500
Dubai	Dubai	(France) René Marsiglia	Police Officers Club Stadium	6,500
Ittihad Kalba	Kalba	(Brazil) Zé Mário	Ittihad Kalba Club Stadium	3,000

=== Managerial changes ===
Managerial changes during the 2012–13 campaign.

==== Pre-season ====
Team	Outgoing manager	Manner of departure	Replaced by
Al Wasl	(Argentina) Diego Maradona	Sacked	(France) Bruno Metsu
Al Wahda	(Austria) Josef Hickersberger	Resigned	(Croatia) Branko Ivanković
Al Dhafra			(Bosnia and Herzegovina) Džemal Hadžiabdić
Al Sharjah	(Romania) Valeriu Tiţa		(Tunisia) Faouzi Benzarti
Dubai	(Egypt) Ayman El Ramady		(France) René Marsiglia
Baniyas	(Argentina) Gabriel Calderón	Contract not renewed	(Czech Republic) Jozef Chovanec
Al Jazira	(Brazil) Caio Júnior	Contract not renewed	(Brazil) Paulo Bonamigo
Al Shabab	(Brazil) Paulo Bonamigo	Resigned	(Brazil) Marcos Paqueta

==== During season ====
Team	Outgoing manager	Manner of departure	Replaced by
Ittihad Kalba	(Croatia) Dragan Talajić	Sacked	(Tunisia) Lotfi Benzarti
Al Wasl	(France) Bruno Metsu	Illness	(France) Gilles Morisseau & (United Arab Emirates) Nasser Khamis (caretaker)
Dibba Al Fujairah	(Brazil) Marcelo Cabo	Sacked	(United Arab Emirates) Abdullah Mesfer
Al Wasl	(France) Gilles Morisseau & (United Arab Emirates) Nasser Khamis (caretaker)	Temporary mandate	(France) Guy Lacombe
Ittihad Kalba	(Tunisia) Lotfi Benzarti	Sacked	(Brazil) Zé Mário
Al Shaab	(Brazil) Sérgio Alexandre	Sacked	(Romania) Marius Șumudică
Al Dhafra	(Bosnia and Herzegovina) Džemal Hadžiabdić	Sacked	(France) Laurent Banide
Al Wasl	(France) Guy Lacombe	Sacked	(United Arab Emirates) Eid Baroot
Al Jazira	(Brazil) Paulo Bonamigo	Sacked	(Spain) Luis Milla
Al Wahda	(Croatia) Branko Ivanković	Sacked	(Austria) Josef Hickersberger
Baniyas	(Czech Republic) Jozef Chovanec	Appointed as technical director	(United Arab Emirates) Salem Al Orafi

=== Foreign players ===
Club	Player 1	Player 2	Player 3	AFC player	Former player(s)
Ajman	(Ivory Coast) Boris Kabi	(Mali) Founéké Sy	(Morocco) Driss Fettouhi	(Oman) Fawzi Bashir	(Algeria) Karim Kerkar (Iraq) Karrar Jassim (Morocco) Abdessamad Ouhakki
Al Ahli	(Brazil) Grafite	(Chile) Luis Jiménez	(Portugal) Ricardo Quaresma	(Lebanon) Youssef Mohamad	(Cameroon) Achille Emaná
Al Ain	(France) Jirès Kembo Ekoko	(Ghana) Asamoah Gyan	(Romania) Mirel Rădoi	(Australia) Alex Brosque	
Al Dhafra	(Brazil) Rodriguinho	(Ivory Coast) Amara Diané	(Senegal) Makhete Diop	(Jordan) Anas Bani Yaseen	(Oman) Fawzi Bashir
Al Jazira	(Argentina) Matías Delgado	(Brazil) Fernandinho	(Brazil) Ricardo Oliveira	(South Korea) Shin Hyung-min	
Al Nasr	(Brazil) Bruno Correa	(Brazil) Léo Lima	(Italy) Giuseppe Mascara	(Japan) Takayuki Morimoto	(Iraq) Nashat Akram
Al Shaab	(France) Michaël N'dri	(Portugal) Filipe Teixeira	(Zimbabwe) Noel Kaseke	(Lebanon) Hassan Maatouk	(Brazil) Careca (Brazil) Rodriguinho
Al Shabab	(Brazil) Ciel	(Brazil) Edgar	(Brazil) Luiz Henrique	(Uzbekistan) Azizbek Haydarov	
Al Wahda	(Brazil) Marcelinho	(Gabon) Éric Mouloungui	(Senegal) Papa Waigo	(Australia) Dino Djulbic	(Croatia) Srđan Andrić (Jordan) Anas Bani Yaseen
Al Wasl	(Brazil) Jussiê	(Cameroon) Achille Emaná	(Uruguay) Emiliano Alfaro	(Iraq) Ahmed Ibrahim Khalaf	(Argentina) Mariano Donda (Australia) Lucas Neill (Egypt) Shikabala
Baniyas	(Egypt) Mohamed Aboutrika	(Senegal) André Senghor	(Sweden) Christian Wilhelmsson	(Australia) Nick Carle	(Egypt) Mohamed Zidan (Morocco) Ismail Belmaalem
Dibba Al Fujairah	(Brazil) Alex	(Brazil) Luiz Fernando	(Ghana) Samuel Ocran	(Lebanon) Bilal El Najjarine	(Brazil) Júnior (Syria) Abdelrazaq Al-Hussain
Dubai	(Brazil) Careca	(Brazil) Juca	(Brazil) Magrão	(Uruguay) Richard Porta ^{1}	(Guinea) Alhassane Keita (Guinea) Simon Feindouno (Spain) Juan Quero
Ittihad Kalba	(Brazil) Ji-Paraná	(Guinea) Aboubacar Camara	(Zimbabwe) Edward Sadomba	(Jordan) Amer Deeb	(Brazil) Serginho ^{2} (Morocco) Ahmed Jahouh (Morocco) Nabil Daoudi

- ^1 Richard Porta has Australian citizenship and was counted as an Asian player.
- ^2 Serginho has Syrian citizenship and was counted as an Asian player.

== League table ==
Pos	Team	Pld	W	D	L	GF	GA	GD	Pts	Qualification or relegation
1	Al Ain (C)	26	20	2	4	74	26	+48	62	Qualification to the 2014 AFC Champions League Group Stage
2	Al Ahli	26	15	6	5	62	33	+29	51	Qualification to the 2014 AFC Champions League Group Stage
3	Al Jazira	26	13	8	5	56	37	+19	47	Qualification to the 2014 AFC Champions League Group Stage
4	Baniyas	26	14	5	7	50	37	+13	47	Qualification to the 2014 AFC Champions League Second Qualifying Round
5	Al Shabab	26	13	3	10	48	39	+9	42	Qualification to the 2014 GCC Champions League
6	Al Nasr	26	11	6	9	51	40	+11	39	Qualification to the 2014 GCC Champions League
7	Al Wahda	26	12	3	11	44	41	+3	39	
8	Al Dhafra	26	9	9	8	37	46	−9	36	
9	Al Wasl	26	8	8	10	41	45	−4	32	
10	Ajman	26	8	6	12	48	58	−10	30	
11	Dubai	26	6	9	11	32	53	−21	27	
12	Al Shaab	26	7	4	15	37	49	−12	25	
13	Dibba Al Fujairah (R)	26	6	3	17	30	55	−25	21	Relegation to the 2013–14 UAE Second Division
14	Ittihad Kalba (R)	26	3	2	21	24	75	−51	11	Relegation to the 2013–14 UAE Second Division

Source: Full Standings
Rules for classification: 1) points; 2) goal difference; 3) number of goals scored.
(C) Champions; (R) Relegated

== Results ==
Home \ Away	AJM	ALI	AIN	DHA	ITT	JAZ	NAS	SHB	SHA	WAH	WAS	YAS	DAF	DUB
Ajman		1–2	1–4	0–3	6–1	2–4	2–1	3–1	2–2	4–2	0–2	3–3	3–3	2–1
Al Ahli	3–0		0–3	1–1	3–0	0–2	2–2	2–0	5–1	2–0	4–0	0–0	1–0	1–1
Al Ain	4–0	3–6		7–0	6–0	1–0	2–1	2–1	2–1	2–1	5–0	2–2	0–1	3–0
Al Dhafra	1–1	2–1	0–3		1–0	2–1	1–0	3–3	1–1	1–2	2–1	1–3	2–3	1–1
Ittihad Kalba	0–3	1–3	1–3	2–1		1–3	2–1	0–4	0–2	0–6	2–2	1–2	1–2	1–3
Al Jazira	2–1	2–2	2–2	4–1	3–1		1–2	2–0	2–1	2–2	2–3	3–0	3–3	1–1
Al Nasr	1–1	2–3	0–2	1–2	6–1	3–3		2–1	2–3	4–1	2–2	2–1	3–1	4–1
Al Shaab	2–1	1–3	1–0	2–2	2–1	2–3	1–1		0–3	1–2	0–0	1–3	5–3	2–3
Al Shabab	2–2	2–0	2–3	0–2	3–2	5–1	2–4	1–2		3–2	2–1	2–0	2–0	3–1
Al Wahda	3–4	2–6	2–0	3–0	2–1	0–2	0–1	1–0	1–0		1–1	2–0	2–0	1–2
Al Wasl	4–2	2–2	1–2	1–1	3–1	0–0	0–1	3–2	2–1	4–1		0–1	2–3	3–1
Baniyas	5–0	1–4	0–3	2–2	2–0	1–3	3–1	4–2	1–0	1–1	3–1		2–0	5–0
Dibba Al Fujairah	1–4	1–0	1–5	0–2	2–3	0–4	1–3	0–1	1–2	0–1	2–1	1–2		0–1
Dubai	1–0	3–6	2–5	2–2	1–1	1–1	1–1	1–0	0–2	0–3	2–2	2–3	0–0	

Updated to match(es) played on unknown. Source: Soccerway
Legend: Blue = home team win; Yellow = draw; Red = away team win.

== Season statistics ==
=== Top scorers ===
Rank	Scorer	Club	Goals
1	(Ghana) Asamoah Gyan	Al Ain	31
2	(Brazil) Grafite	Al Ahli	24
3	(Uruguay) Emiliano Alfaro	Al Wasl	17
4	(Italy) Giuseppe Mascara	Al Nasr	10
5	(Brazil) Ricardo Oliveira	Al Jazira	9
6	(Brazil) Bruno Correa	Al Nasr	8
6	(Ivory Coast) Boris Kabi	Ajman	8
6	(Senegal) André Senghor	Baniyas	8
6	(Senegal) Papa Waigo	Al Wahda	8
6	(Uruguay) Richard Porta	Dubai	8
