= 2013–14 UAE Pro League =

Arabian Gulf League
- Season: 2013–14
- Champions: Al-Ahli
- Relegated: Dubai; Al-Shaab
- AFC Champions League: Al-Ahli; Al-Wahda; Al-Jazira; Al-Ain
- Gulf Champions League: Al-Nasr; Al-Shabab
- Matches: 182
- Goals: 571 (3.14 per match)
- Average goals/game: 3.13
- Top goalscorer: Asamoah Gyan (29)

The 2013–14 UAE Pro League, known as the Arabian Gulf League for sponsorship reasons, is the 39th top-level football season in the United Arab Emirates, and the sixth professional season. Fourteen teams participated, once again with Al Ain as the defending champions after winning the previous two seasons.

The league started on 14 September and finished on 11 May 2014 in accordance with FIFA guidelines ahead of the 2014 World Cup in Brazil.

The league was previously known as the Pro League. Starting from the 2013–14 season, the name was changed to UAE Arabian Gulf League. The name change has been viewed as a revival of the Persian Gulf naming dispute with Iran accusing the United Arab Emirates of racism, and the Football Federation of the Islamic Republic of Iran barring the transfer of Javad Nekounam to a UAE club.

== Teams ==
=== Stadia and locations ===
Locations of teams in the 2013–14 Arabian Gulf League

Team	Home city	Manager	Stadium	Capacity
Ajman	Ajman	(Iraq) Abdul Wahab Abdul Qader	Ajman Stadium	10,000
Al Ahli	Dubai	(Romania) Cosmin Olăroiu	Rashed Stadium	18,000
Al Ain	Al Ain	(Spain) Quique Sánchez Flores	Tahnoun Bin Mohamed Stadium; Hazza Bin Zayed Stadium	15,000; 25,000
Al Dhafra	Madinat Zayed	(United Arab Emirates) Abdullah Mesfer	Hamdan bin Zayed Al Nahyan Stadium	12,000
Al Jazira	Abu Dhabi	(Italy) Walter Zenga	Al Jazira Mohammed Bin Zayed Stadium	42,056
Al Nasr	Dubai	(Serbia) Ivan Jovanović	Al-Maktoum Stadium	12,000
Al Shaab	Sharjah	(Montenegro) Željko Petrović	Khalid Bin Mohammed Stadium	10,000
Al Shabab	Dubai	(Brazil) Marcos Paquetá	Maktoum Bin Rashid Al Maktoum Stadium	12,000
Al Wahda	Abu Dhabi	(Portugal) José Peseiro	Al-Nahyan Stadium	12,000
Al Wasl	Dubai	(United Arab Emirates) Saleem Abdelrahman	Zabeel Stadium	12,000
Baniyas	Abu Dhabi	(Iraq) Adnan Hamad	Bani Yas Stadium	9,570
Dubai	Dubai	(Switzerland) Umberto Barberis	Police Officers Club Stadium	6,500
Emirates	Ras al-Khaimah	(Brazil) Paulo Comelli	Emirates Club Stadium	5,000
Sharjah	Sharjah	(Brazil) Paulo Bonamigo	Sharjah Stadium	18,000

- Al Ain moved into their new stadium, the Hazza Bin Zayed Stadium on the 16th matchday.

=== Managerial changes ===
Managerial changes during the 2013-14 campaign.

Team	Outgoing manager	Manner of departure	Replaced by
Al Wahda	(Austria) Josef Hickersberger	End of contract	(Czech Republic) Karel Jarolim
Al Ahli	(Spain) Quique Sánchez Flores	End of contract	(Romania) Cosmin Olăroiu
Al Nasr	(Italy) Walter Zenga	Mutual consent	(Serbia) Ivan Jovanović
Baniyas	(United Arab Emirates) Salem Al Orafi	End of contract	(Uruguay) Jorge da Silva
Dubai	(France) René Marsiglia	End of contract	(Switzerland) Martin Rueda
Al Wasl	(United Arab Emirates) Eid Baroot	End of contract	(France) Laurent Banide
Al Ain	(Romania) Cosmin Olăroiu	Signed by Al Ahli	(Uruguay) Jorge Fossati
Al Ain	(Uruguay) Jorge Fossati	Sacked	(United Arab Emirates) Ahmed Abdullah
Al Wasl	(France) Laurent Banide	Sacked	(Argentina) Hector Cuper
Al Jazira	(Spain) Luis Milla	Sacked	(Italy) Walter Zenga
Al Ain	(United Arab Emirates) Ahmed Abdullah	Temporary mandate over	(Spain) Quique Sánchez Flores
Dubai	(Switzerland) Martin Rueda	Sacked	(Switzerland) Umberto Barberis
Al Wahda	(Czech Republic) Karel Jarolim	Sacked	(Portugal) José Peseiro
Emirates	(United Arab Emirates) Eid Baroot	Sacked	(Brazil) Paulo Comelli
Al Shaab	(Romania) Marius Șumudică	Sacked	(Turkey) Jamsheer Muratocalo
Al Shaab	(Turkey) Jamsheer Muratocalo	Caretaker role finished	(Montenegro) Željko Petrović
Baniyas	(Uruguay) Jorge da Silva	Sacked	(Iraq) Adnan Hamad
Al Wasl	(Argentina) Hector Cuper	Sacked	(United Arab Emirates) Saleem Abdelrahman

=== Foreign players ===
The number of foreign players is restricted to four per AGL team.

Club	Player 1	Player 2	Player 3	Player 4	Former players
Ajman	(Guinea) Simon Feindouno	(Iraq) Ahmed Ibrahim Khalaf	(Ivory Coast) Bakari Koné	(Ivory Coast) Boris Kabi	(Kuwait) Yousef Nasser (Morocco) Driss Fettouhi
Al Ahli	(Brazil) Ciel	(Brazil) Grafite	(Chile) Luis Jiménez	(Portugal) Hugo Viana	
Al Ain	(Australia) Alex Brosque	(Belgium) Yassine El Ghanassy	(Ghana) Asamoah Gyan	(Romania) Mirel Rădoi	(Brazil) Michel Bastos (France) Jirès Kembo Ekoko
Al Dhafra	(Brazil) Rogério	(Lebanon) Bilal El Najjarine	(Morocco) Kamel Chafni	(Senegal) Makhete Diop	(Ghana) Emmanuel Clottey
Al Jazira	(Brazil) Jucilei	(Ecuador) Felipe Caicedo	(Morocco) Abdelaziz Barrada	(South Korea) Shin Hyung-min	(Brazil) Ricardo Oliveira (Paraguay) Nelson Valdez
Al Nasr	(Australia) Brett Holman	(Brazil) Éder Luís	(Brazil) Léo Lima	(Senegal) Ibrahima Touré	
Al Shaab	(Cape Verde) Josimar Lima	(France) Michaël N'dri	(Uzbekistan) Oybek Kilichev	(Venezuela) Jesús Meza	(Australia) Billy Celeski (Brazil) Thiago Quirino (Sierra Leone) Julius Wobay
Al Shabab	(Brazil) Adeílson	(Brazil) Edgar	(Chile) Carlos Villanueva	(Uzbekistan) Azizbek Haydarov	(Brazil) Éder Lima
Al Wahda	(Argentina) Damián Díaz	(Argentina) Sebastián Tagliabúe	(Kuwait) Hussain Fadhel	(Morocco) Adil Hermach	(Australia) Dino Djulbic (Chile) Marco Estrada
Al Wasl	(Argentina) Emmanuel Culio	(Argentina) Mariano Donda	(Brazil) Ricardo Oliveira	(Chile) Edson Puch	(Australia) Milan Susak (Morocco) Abdelfettah Boukhriss (Senegal) André Senghor
Baniyas	(Argentina) Luis Fariña	(Argentina) Sebastián Prediger	(Chile) Carlos Muñoz	(Oman) Abdul Salam Al-Mukhaini	(Brazil) Marcelinho
Dubai	(Ivory Coast) Gilles Yapi Yapo	(Mali) Moustapha Kondé	(Morocco) Salaheddine Saidi	(Syria) Jehad Al-Hussain	(Brazil) André Alves (Brazil) Bruno Correa (Mali) Dramane Traoré
Emirates	(Argentina) Germán Herrera	(Brazil) Derley	(Brazil) Luiz Henrique	(Brazil) Rodriguinho	(Brazil) Diego Perão (Brazil) Jair
Sharjah	(Brazil) Fellype Gabriel	(Brazil) Maurício Ramos	(Brazil) Zé Carlos	(South Korea) Kim Jung-woo	

== League table ==
Pos	Team	Pld	W	D	L	GF	GA	GD	Pts	Qualification or relegation
1	Al-Ahli (C)	26	20	4	2	55	28	+27	64	2015 AFC Champions League group stage (Note: Al Ain qualified through winning the Presidents Cup.)
2	Al-Wahda	26	13	9	4	53	33	+20	48	2015 AFC Champions League Third qualifying round
3	Al Jazira	26	12	9	5	46	35	+11	45	2015 AFC Champions League Third qualifying round
4	Al Shabab	26	13	5	8	42	28	+14	44	2015 GCC Champions League group stage
5	Al Nasr	26	13	5	8	42	32	+10	44	2015 GCC Champions League group stage
6	Al Ain	26	12	7	7	52	33	+19	43	2015 AFC Champions League group stage
7	Al Sharjah	26	10	10	6	29	25	+4	40	
8	Al-Dhafra	26	9	8	9	44	44	0	35	
9	Baniyas	26	8	7	11	43	42	+1	31	
10	Ajman	26	7	7	12	39	46	−7	28	
11	Emirates	26	6	7	13	40	53	−13	25	
12	Al Wasl	26	7	4	15	32	47	−15	25	
13	Dubai (R)	26	3	6	17	24	63	−39	15	Relegation to UAE Division 1 Group A
14	Al-Shaab (R)	26	3	4	19	28	61	−33	13	Relegation to UAE Division 1 Group A

Updated to match(es) played on 11 May 2014. Source: Arabian Gulf League 2013-2014 table
Rules for classification: 1) points; 2) goal difference; 3) number of goals scored.
(C) Champions; (R) Relegated

== Results ==
Home \ Away	AJM	ALI	AIN	DHA	JAZ	NAS	SHB	SHA	SHR	WAH	WAS	YAS	DUB	EMI
Ajman		1–2	0–0	0–0	1–0	3–0	2–1	0–1	1–2	2–2	4–2	3–4	1–1	3–2
Al-Ahli	2–1		1–0	3–1	2–2	3–1	1–0	2–0	2–1	2–1	2–1	4–1	4–2	4–2
Al Ain	2–1	2–3		1–1	2–2	3–2	5–2	0–0	1–1	0–1	3–0	2–1	5–2	5–2
Al-Dhafra	2–4	1–4	4–3		1–1	1–1	2–1	2–6	2–2	1–3	3–1	0–0	3–2	1–3
Al Jazira	0–0	1–3	2–1	2–2		1–2	3–0	1–0	1–0	4–4	2–3	2–0	2–2	1–0
Al Nasr	2–1	0–2	1–0	2–1	0–0		2–1	2–1	0–0	0–2	6–1	4–3	5–1	0–0
Al-Shaab	4–4	1–3	0–5	1–2	1–2	2–0		2–1	1–1	1–3	1–4	1–2	2–1	3–3
Al Shabab	3–1	1–1	3–1	1–0	2–4	2–0	1–0		2–0	1–2	1–0	1–1	3–0	3–1
Al Sharjah	2–1	1–1	1–3	0–3	1–1	0–0	1–0	1–2		2–1	2–0	1–0	3–0	0–0
Al-Wahda	4–1	0–0	1–1	1–0	3–4	3–2	2–0	1–1	1–1		3–1	3–2	2–0	4–0
Al Wasl	0–1	2–1	0–1	2–1	1–2	1–2	1–0	1–3	0–1	3–3		1–1	0–0	1–0
Baniyas	4–1	2–3	1–1	0–0	1–2	0–2	4–0	1–1	1–3	1–1	0–2		4–0	2–1
Dubai Club	2–1	0–1	0–3	1–5	0–2	0–3	1–1	1–0	1–2	1–1	1–3	1–4		1–1
Emirates Club	1–1	1–2	1–2	2–3	3–2	0–3	5–2	3–2	0–0	2–1	2–1	2–3	2–3	

Updated to match(es) played on 11 May 2014. Source: Soccerway
Legend: Blue = home team win; Yellow = draw; Red = away team win.
