= Feindouno =

Feindouno is a surname. Notable people with the surname include:

- Benjamin Feindouno (born 1983), Guinean footballer
- Pascal Feindouno (born 1981), Guinean footballer
- Simon Feindouno (born 1985), French-Guinean footballer
