= 2014–15 UAE Pro League =

Arabian Gulf League
- Season: 2014–15
- Champions: Al-Ain (12th title)
- Relegated: Ajman; Al-Ittihad Kalba
- 2016 AFC Champions League: Al-Ain; Al-Jazira; Al-Shabab Al-Arabi; Al-Nasr
- 2015–16 GCC Champions League: Al-Wasl; Baniyas
- Matches: 182
- Goals: 562 (3.09 per match)
- Average goals/game: 3.09
- Top goalscorer: Mirko Vučinić (25 goals)
- Biggest home win: Al Ain 7–1 Ajman (13 February 2015)
- Biggest away win: Fujairah 0–7 Baniyas (30 November 2014)
- Highest scoring: Al Ain 7–1 Ajman (13 February 2015)
- Longest winning run: Al Jazira (5 matches)
- Longest unbeaten run: Al Ain (12 matches)
- Longest winless run: Ajman (14 matches)
- Longest losing run: Kalba (9 matches)
- Highest attendance: 19,790 Al-Jazira vs. Al Wahda
- Lowest attendance: 182 Ajman vs. Emirates
- Average attendance: 2,529

The 2014–15 UAE Pro League, known as the Arabian Gulf League for sponsorship reasons, was the 40th top-level football season in the United Arab Emirates. Fourteen teams participated with Al Ahli as the defending champions after securing the championship last season for the first time since the 2008–09 campaign.

The league was started on 15 September 2014 and was concluded on 15 May 2015.

== Teams ==
Al Shaab and Dubai Club were relegated to the second tier being replaced by Ittihad Kalba and Fujairah who were both relegated in the 2012–13 campaign.

=== Stadia and locations ===
Locations of teams in the 2014–15 UAE Pro-League

Team	Home city	Emirate	Manager	Stadium	Capacity
Ajman	Ajman	Ajman	(Portugal) Manuel Cajuda	Ajman Stadium	5,537
Al Ahli	Dubai	Dubai	(Romania) Cosmin Olăroiu	Rashed Stadium	9,415
Al Ain	Al Ain	Abu Dhabi	(Croatia) Zlatko Dalić	Hazza Bin Zayed Stadium	25,000
Al Dhafra	Madinat Zayed	Abu Dhabi	(France) Laurent Banide	Al Dhafra Stadium	5,020
Al Jazira	Abu Dhabi	Abu Dhabi	(Belgium) Eric Gerets	Al Jazira Stadium	42,056
Al Nasr	Dubai	Dubai	(Serbia) Ivan Jovanović	Al-Maktoum Stadium	10,954
Al Shabab	Dubai	Dubai	(Brazil) Caio Júnior	Rashid Al Maktoum Stadium	8,011
Al Wahda	Abu Dhabi	Abu Dhabi	(Saudi Arabia) Sami Al-Jaber	Al-Nahyan Stadium	11,538
Al Wasl	Dubai	Dubai	(Argentina) Gabriel Calderon	Zabeel Stadium	8,411
Baniyas	Abu Dhabi	Abu Dhabi	(Spain) Luis García Plaza	Baniyas Stadium	9,047
Emirates	Ras al-Khaimah	Ras al-Khaimah	(Brazil) Paulo Comelli	Emirates Club Stadium	5,020
Fujairah	Fujairah	Fujairah	(Czech Republic) Ivan Hašek	Fujairah Club Stadium	5,020
Ittihad Kalba	Kalba	Sharjah	(United Arab Emirates) Walid Obaid Al-Balooshi	Ittihad Kalba Stadium	3,000
Sharjah	Sharjah	Sharjah	(Brazil) Paulo Bonamigo	Sharjah Stadium	10,082

=== Managerial changes ===
Team	Outgoing manager	Manner of departure	Date of vacancy	Position in table	Incoming manager	Date of appointment
Al Jazira	(Italy) Walter Zenga	Sacked	Pre-season	14 May 2014	(Belgium) Eric Gerets	20 May 2014
Al Shabab	(Brazil) Marcos Paquetá	Mutual consent	Pre-season	23 May 2014	(Brazil) Caio Júnior	23 May 2014
Baniyas	(Iraq) Adnan Hamad	Mutual consent	Pre-season	1 July 2014	(Spain) Luis García Plaza	10 July 2014
Al Wasl	(Brazil) Jorginho	Mutual consent	13th	1 October 2014	(Argentina) Gabriel Calderón	1 October 2014
Ajman	(Tunisia) Fathi Al-Jabal	Sacked	13th	25 January 2015	(Portugal) Manuel Cajuda	27 January 2015
Al Wahda	(Portugal) José Peseiro	Sacked	4th	10 February 2015	(Saudi Arabia) Sami Al Jaber	16 February 2015

=== Foreign players ===
Club	Player 1	Player 2	Player 3	Player 4	Former players
Ajman	(Brazil) Rafael Crivellaro	(Iraq) Ahmed Ibrahim Khalaf	(Ivory Coast) Boris Kabi	(Morocco) Driss Fettouhi	(Algeria) Karim Ziani (Ivory Coast) Bakari Koné
Al Ahli	(Brazil) Éverton Ribeiro	(Chile) Luis Jiménez	(Morocco) Oussama Assaidi	(South Korea) Kwon Kyung-won	(Brazil) Ciel (Brazil) Grafite (Chile) Carlos Muñoz (Portugal) Hugo Viana (Romania) Mirel Rădoi
Al Ain	(France) Jirès Kembo Ekoko	(Ghana) Asamoah Gyan	(Slovakia) Miroslav Stoch	(South Korea) Lee Myung-joo	
Al Dhafra	(Iraq) Humam Tariq	(Lebanon) Bilal El Najjarine	(Morocco) Youssef Kaddioui	(Senegal) Makhete Diop	(Argentina) Matías Defederico (Brazil) Diego Felipe (Brazil) Paulinho Guerreiro
Al Jazira	(Argentina) Manuel Lanzini	(Brazil) Jucilei	(Burkina Faso) Jonathan Pitroipa	(Montenegro) Mirko Vučinić	
Al Nasr	(Australia) Brett Holman	(Brazil) Renan Garcia	(Senegal) Ibrahima Touré	(Spain) Pablo Hernández	(North Macedonia) Ivan Trichkovski
Al Shabab	(Brazil) Edgar	(Chile) Carlos Villanueva	(Moldova) Henrique Luvannor	(Uzbekistan) Azizbek Haydarov	
Al Wahda	(Argentina) Damián Díaz	(Argentina) Sebastián Tagliabúe	(Kuwait) Hussain Fadhel	(Morocco) Adil Hermach	
Al Wasl	(Brazil) Caio Canedo	(Brazil) Éderson	(Brazil) Fábio Lima	(Portugal) Hugo Viana	(Brazil) Neto Berola
Baniyas	(Argentina) Denis Stracqualursi	(Spain) Ángel Dealbert	(Spain) Joan Verdú		(Chile) Carlos Muñoz (South Korea) Kim Jung-woo
Emirates	(Brazil) Alexandro	(Brazil) Luiz Henrique	(Morocco) Issam Erraki	(South Korea) Sin Jin-ho	(Argentina) Germán Herrera (Brazil) Rodrigo Silva
Fujairah	(Algeria) Karim Ziani	(Algeria) Madjid Bougherra	(Ivory Coast) Boubacar Sanogo	(Lebanon) Hassan Maatouk	(Algeria) Hassan Yebda
Ittihad Kalba	(Brazil) Danilo Bueno	(Timor-Leste) Paulo Martins	(Morocco) Said Fettah	(Senegal) Papa Waigo	(Brazil) Rafael (São Tomé and Príncipe) Luís Leal (Syria) Wael Ayan
Sharjah	(Brazil) Marion	(Brazil) Maurício Ramos	(Brazil) Rodriguinho	(Brazil) Wanderley	(Brazil) Léo Lima (Brazil) Luan

== League table ==
Pos	Team	Pld	W	D	L	GF	GA	GD	Pts	Qualification or relegation
1	Al-Ain (C)	26	18	6	2	62	19	+43	60	Qualification to the 2016 AFC Champions League Group Stage
2	Al-Jazira	26	16	3	7	66	46	+20	51	Qualification to the 2016 AFC Champions League Qualifying play-off
3	Al-Shabab	26	14	7	5	49	35	+14	49	Qualification to the 2016 AFC Champions League Second Qualifying Round
4	Al-Wahda	26	13	8	5	44	32	+12	47	
5	Al-Nasr	26	10	9	7	43	32	+11	39	Qualification to the 2016 AFC Champions League Group Stage (Note: Al-Nasr qualifies for 2016 AFC Champions League Group Stage as winners of 2014–15 UAE President's Cup.)
6	Al-Wasl	26	10	9	7	53	45	+8	39	Qualification to the 2016 GCC Champions League
7	Al-Ahli	26	10	8	8	35	27	+8	38	
8	Baniyas	26	9	8	9	42	37	+5	35	Qualification to the 2016 GCC Champions League
9	Fujairah	26	9	5	12	23	45	−22	32	
10	Emirates	26	8	6	12	34	45	−11	30	
11	Al-Dhafra	26	5	12	9	31	33	−2	27	
12	Sharjah	26	7	5	14	36	43	−7	26	
13	Ajman (R)	26	2	9	15	27	60	−33	15	Relegation to the 2015–16 UAE Division 1 Group A
14	Ittihad Kalba (R)	26	3	1	22	17	63	−46	10	Relegation to the 2015–16 UAE Division 1 Group A

Updated to match(es) played on 3 June 2015. Source:
Rules for classification: 1) points; 2) goal difference; 3) number of goals scored.
(C) Champions; (R) Relegated

== Results ==
Home \ Away	AJM	AHL	AIN	JAZ	NAS	SHB	WAS	BAN	DHA	EMI	FUJ	KAL	SHR	WAH
Ajman		0–0	0–4	2–3	0–3	2–2	1–2	2–2	1–1	2–4	0–1	0–1	0–4	3–3
Al-Ahli	0–0		1–1	4–2	2–2	2–4	0–4	0–0	1–0	0–1	4–0	2–0	2–0	1–1
Al Ain	7–1	1–0		2–1	1–1	2–1	2–0	1–0	3–1	2–1	3–0	4–0	4–1	4–0
Al Jazira	3–1	2–0	4–3		3–2	2–4	4–2	1–4	1–2	3–0	2–2	3–0	1–2	1–1
Al Nasr	1–1	2–1	1–2	2–4		1–1	0–0	0–0	1–0	3–0	5–1	3–0	3–0	0–2
Al Shabab	2–1	1–0	1–1	3–4	2–1		2–2	1–0	1–1	1–3	1–0	2–1	4–2	1–2
Al Wasl	3–3	1–5	0–1	2–4	2–2	2–2		1–2	2–2	2–2	3–1	1–0	2–1	3–0
Baniyas	3–0	1–0	0–3	2–3	1–1	2–0	2–2		1–0	2–3	1–1	1–0	2–5	1–2
Dhafra	1–1	2–2	1–1	3–3	2–2	1–2	3–1	2–3		1–1	0–0	3–1	2–0	1–2
Emirates	0–2	0–1	1–5	0–2	0–3	2–3	2–3	3–0	0–0		1–2	1–0	1–1	1–2
Fujairah	1–0	1–1	1–0	1–3	0–1	0–3	1–4	0–7	0–0	0–1		2–1	2–1	1–0
Kalba	2–3	0–3	1–4	0–4	2–0	0–2	1–6	1–1	1–0	0–3	2–3		1–2	0–1
Sharjah	4–1	0–1	1–1	1–2	0–2	0–2	0–1	1–1	0–1	1–1	0–2	4–2		4–1
Wahda	3–0	1–2	0–0	1–0	5–1	1–1	2–2	3–1	2–1	2–1	1–0	5–0	1–1	

Updated to match(es) played on 12 April 2015. Source: Soccerway
Legend: Blue = home team win; Yellow = draw; Red = away team win.

== Season statistics ==
=== Goalscorers ===
As of matches played 15 May 2015

Rank	Player	Club	Goals
1	(Montenegro) Mirko Vučinić	Al Jazira	25
2	(Senegal) Ibrahima Touré	Al Nasr	18
3	(Brazil) Wanderley	Sharjah	17
4	(United Arab Emirates) Ali Mabkhout	Al Jazira	16
4	(Brazil) Caio	Al Wasl	16
4	(Brazil) Fábio Lima	Al Wasl	16
5	(Argentina) Sebastián Tagliabué	Wahda	15
6	(Brazil) Éderson	Al Wasl	14
7	(Ghana) Asamoah Gyan	Al Ain	13
8	(Senegal) Makhete Diop	Dhafra	12
9	(Moldova) Henrique Luvannor	Al Shabab	11

=== Hat-tricks ===
Player	For	Against	Result	Date
(Montenegro) Mirko Vučinić	Al Jazira	Emirates	3–0	25 September 2014
(United Arab Emirates) Ahmed Khalil	Al Ahli	Al Jazira	4–2	18 October 2014
(United Arab Emirates) Ali Mabkhout	Al Jazira	Ajman	3–1	4 February 2015
(Ghana) Asamoah Gyan	Al Ain	Fujairah	3–0	28 February 2015
