= 2017 Champions League =

2017 Champions League may refer to:

== Football ==
- 2016–17 UEFA Champions League
- 2017–18 UEFA Champions League
- 2017 AFC Champions League
- 2017 CAF Champions League
- 2017 GCC Champions League
