= List of United Arab Emirates national football team managers =

The following list is a list of United Arab Emirates national football team managers since 1972.

== List ==
Manager	From	To	Notes & Honours
(Egypt) Mohammed Sheita	1972	1973	
(United Arab Emirates) Jumaa Gharib	1973	1973	
(Egypt) Mohammed Sheita	1973	1974	
(Egypt) Mimi El-Sherbini	1975	1975	
(United Arab Emirates) Jumaa Gharib	1975	1976	
(Socialist Federal Republic of Yugoslavia) Dimitri Tadić	1976	1976	
(England) Don Revie	1977	1980	
(Iran) Heshmat Mohajerani	1980	1984	UAE's First Asian Cup Appearance
(Brazil) Carlos Alberto Parreira	1984	1988	
(Brazil) Mario Zagallo	1988	1990	UAE's First World Cup Appearance
(Poland) Bernhard Blaut	1990	1990	
(Brazil) Carlos Alberto Parreira	1990	1990	
(Soviet Union) (Ukraine) Valeriy Lobanovskyi	1990	1993	
(Poland) Antoni Piechniczek	1993	1995	
(Croatia) Tomislav Ivić	1995	1996	1996 AFC Asian Cup Runner Ups
(Brazil) Lori Sandri	1997	1997	
(Czech Republic) Milan Máčala	1997	1997	UAE's First Confederations Cup Appearance
(Brazil) Lori Sandri	1998	1998	
(Portugal) Carlos Queiroz	1998	1999	
(Croatia) Srećko Juričić	1999	1999	
(United Arab Emirates) Abdullah Masfar	2000	2000	
(France) Henri Michel	2000	2001	
(United Arab Emirates) Abdullah Saqr	2001	2001	
(Netherlands) Tini Ruijs	2001	2001	
(Netherlands) Jo Bonfrere	2001	2002	
(England) Roy Hodgson	2002	2004	
(France) Jean-François Jodar	2004	2004	
(Netherlands) Aad De Mos	2004	2005	
(Netherlands) Dick Advocaat	2005	2005	
(United Arab Emirates) Jumaa Rabie	2005	2005	
(United Arab Emirates) Badr Saleh	2005	2005	Interim manager
(France) Bruno Metsu	2006	2008	18th Arabian Gulf Cup Champions
(France) Dominique Bathenay	2008	2009	
(Slovenia) Srečko Katanec	2009	2011	
(United Arab Emirates) Abdullah Masfar	2011	2012	
(United Arab Emirates) Mahdi Ali	2012	2017	21st Arabian Gulf Cup Champions
(Argentina) Edgardo Bauza	2017	2017	
(Italy) Alberto Zaccheroni	2017	2019	
(United Arab Emirates) Saleem Abdulrahman	2019	2019	Interim manager
(Netherlands) Bert van Marwijk	2019	2019	
(Serbia) Ivan Jovanović	2019	2020	
(Colombia) Jorge Luis Pinto	2020	2020	
(Netherlands) Bert van Marwijk	2020	2022	
(Argentina) Rodolfo Arruabarrena	2022	2023	
(Portugal) Paulo Bento	2023	2025	
(Romania) Cosmin Olăroiu	2025	2026	
(Croatia) Zlatko Dalić	2026		

== By Nationality ==
Country	Managers
United Arab Emirates	7
Netherlands	5
France	4
Brazil	3
Croatia	3
Argentina	2
Egypt	2
England	2
Poland	2
Portugal	2
Serbia	2
Colombia	1
Czech Republic	1
Iran	1
Italy	1
Romania	1
Slovenia	1
Ukraine	1
