= Paulo Junior =

Paulo Junior may refer to:

- Paulo Jr. (born 1969), full name Paulo Xisto Pinto Júnior, Brazilian bassist for the band Sepultura
- Paulo Júnior (footballer, 1984-2018), full name Paulo Roberto Morais Júnior, Brazilian football striker
- Paulo Jr. (footballer) (born 1989), full name Paulo Morais de Araújo Júnior, Brazilian football forward
