= Ahmed Mahmoud =

Sudani footballer (born 2009)

Personal information
- Full name: Ahmed Nasir Galal Mahmoud
- Date of birth: 30 March 1989 (age 37)
- Place of birth: Umm Al Quwain, United Arab Emirates
- Height: 1.82 m (5 ft 11 1/2 in)
- Position: Goalkeeper

Team information
- Current team: Dibba Al-Hisn
- Number: 12

Youth career
- Al Shabab

Senior career*
Years	Team	Apps	(Gls)
2009–2011	Al Shabab	3	(0)
2011–2014	Al Wasl	35	(0)
2014–2016	Al Ahli	14	(0)
2016–2017	Baniyas	21	(0)
2017–2020	Al Sharjah SC	16	(0)
2020–2021	Hatta	12	(0)
2021–2025	Khor Fakkan	35	(0)
2025–	Dibba Al-Hisn	0	(0)

International career
2014–2018	United Arab Emirates		
- * Club domestic league appearances and goals

Ahmed Mahmoud Mohamed Juma Ashoori (Arabic:أحمد محمود; born 30 March 1989) is an Emirati footballer. He currently plays for Dibba Al-Hisn as a goalkeeper .
