= 2016 Champions League =

2016 Champions League may refer to:

== Football ==
- 2015–16 UEFA Champions League
- 2016–17 UEFA Champions League
- 2016 AFC Champions League
- 2016 CAF Champions League
- 2016 GCC Champions League
