= Makhete Diop =

Senegalese footballer (born 1987)

Personal information
- Full name: Makhete Diop
- Date of birth: 8 July 1987 (age 39)
- Place of birth: Louga, Senegal
- Height: 1.85 m (6 ft 1 in)
- Position: Striker

Youth career
- 2006–2007: Port Autonome

Senior career*
Years	Team	Apps	(Gls)
2008–2009	ASC Yakaar	28	(15)
2009	Al Watani	9	(1)
2009–2010	Nejmeh		(23)
2010–2011	Al Karamah		(10)
2011–2016	Al Dhafra	130	(106)
2017–2018	Shabab Al Ahli	28	(18)
2018–2020	Beijing Renhe	47	(22)
2020–2021	Al Shabab	25	(8)
2021–2022	Al Dhafra	36	(12)
2022–2023	Sharjah	7	(1)
- * Club domestic league appearances and goals as of 19:02, 12 March 2023 (UTC)

Makhete Diop (born 8 July 1987) is a Senegalese footballer who plays as a striker.

== Club career ==
Diop previously played for Al Watani in the Saudi League. He was the leading goalscorer in the 2009–10 Lebanese league. In August 2010, Diop signed for Syrian League club Al-Karamah on a three-year deal.

On 1 February 2021, Diop returned to UAE Pro League side Al-Dhafra.

== Career statistics ==
As of match played 12 March 2023

Club	Season	League			National cup (Note: Includes Kings Cup)		League cup (Note: Includes Saudi Crown Prince Cup)		Continental		Other		Total	
Club	Season	Division	Apps	Goals	Apps	Goals	Apps	Goals	Apps	Goals	Apps	Goals	Apps	Goals
Al Dhafra	2011–12	UAE First Division	21	29	1	1	0	0	—		3	2	25	32
Al Dhafra	2012–13	UAE Pro League	25	18	0	0	4	4	—		—		29	22
Al Dhafra	2013–14	UAE Pro League	25	22	3	3	7	4	—		1	1	36	30
Al Dhafra	2014–15	UAE Pro League	22	12	3	0	6	4	—		—		31	16
Al Dhafra	2015–16	UAE Pro League	24	13	1	0	4	2	—		—		29	15
Al Dhafra	2016–17	UAE Pro League	13	12	1	0	6	5	—		—		20	17
Al Dhafra	Total		130	106	9	4	27	19	0	0	4	3	170	132
Shabab Al Ahli Club	2016–17	UAE Pro League	13	9	0	0	2	3	7 (Note: Appearances in AFC Champions League)	4	—		22	16
Shabab Al Ahli Club	2017–18	UAE Pro League	15	9	2	0	5	4	—		—		22	13
Shabab Al Ahli Club	Total		28	18	2	0	7	7	7	4	0	0	44	29
Beijing Renhe	2018	Chinese Super League	19	10	0	0	—		—		—		19	10
Beijing Renhe	2019	Chinese Super League	28	12	0	0	—		—		—		28	12
Beijing Renhe	total		47	22	0	0	0	0	0	0	0	0	47	22
Al Shabab	2019–20	Saudi Pro League	13	6	0	0	—		—		2 (Note: Appearances in Arab Club Champions Cup)	0	15	6
Al Shabab	2020–21	Saudi Pro League	12	2	1	0	—		—		—		13	2
Al Shabab	Total		25	8	1	0	0	0	0	0	2	0	28	8
Al Dhafra	2020–21	UAE Pro League	11	6	0	0	0	0	—		—		11	6
Al Dhafra	2021–22	UAE Pro League	25	6	1	0	6	3	—		—		32	9
Al Dhafra	Total		36	12	1	0	6	3	0	0	0	0	43	15
Sharjah	2022–23	UAE Pro League	7	1	1	0	2	1	—		—		10	2
Career total			273	167	14	4	42	30	7	4	6	3	339	208

== Honours ==
Individual

- Lebanese Premier League Team of the Season: 2009–10
- Lebanese Premier League top scorer: 2009–10
