= Grafite =

Brazilian footballer (born 1979)

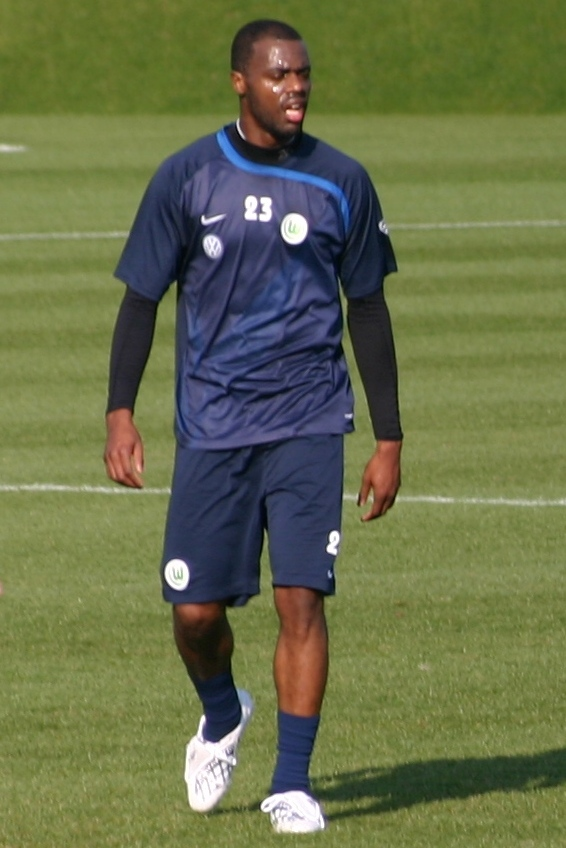
- Grafite training with VfL Wolfsburg in 2009

Personal information
- Full name: Edinaldo Batista Libânio
- Date of birth: 2 April 1979 (age 47)
- Place of birth: Jundiaí, São Paulo, Brazil
- Height: 1.89 m (6 ft 2 in)
- Position: Striker

Youth career
- 1998: Campo Limpo Paulista
- 1999–2000: Matonense

Senior career*
Years	Team	Apps	(Gls)
2001	Ferroviária	0	(0)
2001–2002	Santa Cruz	22	(5)
2002–2003	Grêmio	6	(0)
2003	Anyang LG Cheetahs	9	(0)
2003–2004	Goiás	20	(12)
2004–2006	São Paulo	44	(17)
2006–2007	Le Mans	51	(17)
2007–2011	VfL Wolfsburg	107	(59)
2011–2015	Al-Ahli	79	(63)
2015	Al Sadd	9	(4)
2015–2016	Santa Cruz	46	(20)
2017	Atlético Paranaense	9	(0)
2017–2018	Santa Cruz	9	(0)
Total		411	(197)

International career
2005–2010	Brazil	4	(1)
- * Club domestic league appearances and goals

Edinaldo Batista Libânio (born 2 April 1979), commonly known as Grafite (pronounced [ɡɾaˈfitʃ]), is a Brazilian former professional footballer who played as a striker. He currently works as a pundit for TV Globo and SporTV.

In 2005, Grafite won the Copa Libertadores and the Club World Championship with São Paulo FC. With German club VfL Wolfsburg he won the 2008–09 Bundesliga, and was the league's top scorer as well as Germany's Player of the Year.

== Club career ==
=== Early career ===
Born in Jundiaí, Edinaldo Libânio grew up in modest circumstances in the hinterland of the State of São Paulo. He made his first money with the door to door sales of rubbish bags. His talent as football player however earned him his first professional contract in 1999 with the Matão based club SE Matonense with which he played in the first division of the State Championship. In the beginning of 2000 he moved from there for a brief period to the fourth division club Ferroviária in the neighboring town of Araraquara – a club that actually had seen some quite gifted players in its teams in better seasons.

In the middle of the year, he signed on with the first division club Santa Cruz FC of the north-eastern Brazilian city Recife. There he scored 5 goals in 22 league matches, which did not aid in preventing relegation to Série B.

However, he attracted the attention of Grêmio Porto Alegre, another first division club, which hired him for a transfer fee of one million real – of this sum Santa Cruz had to forward about 700,000 real to Matonense.

Luck was not with him in Porto Alegre. Right at the beginning of the year he incurred a severe knee injury, which saw him sidelined for several months. In July 2002, at one of his first matches for the Rio Grande do Sul club the team was eliminated by Paraguay's Club Olimpia in the semi-finals of the Libertadores. He played six more Série A matches for Grêmio, without scoring, before being returned in September to Santa Cruz on a loan.

With his old club he failed in the Série B semifinals against Criciúma EC to attain promotion to the national top flight. Altogether he scored three second division goals for the Recife club in this phase.

Right at the beginning of 2003, Grafite was transferred to FC Seoul, then known as Anyang LG Cheetahs, in the South Korean K League. It was a brief, undistinguished stint and both, player and club, were happy to part ways by mid-year.

=== Success with Goiás and São Paulo ===
Back in Brazil Grafite joined first division club Goiás EC in the city of Goiânia. This move soon led to legal differences as to who owned the rights to the player, where Grêmio made claims. Another matter in the case were outstanding wage payments by Santa Cruz FC until the end of the previous year. Matters found a resolution in the best interest of Grafite and his new club.

Grafite considered the time in the capital of the state of Goiás as his "rebirth as a footballer". In the course of the season he developed together with Dimba, who became the league's top scorer with 31 goals, and Araújo, who, like Grafite, hit the goal 12 times, into the outstanding attack formation of the club's history. Goiás finished the season ninth, which was considered a success for the club from Brazil's central-west. Grafite himself was awarded with a Bola de Prata as best player on his position over the season.

At the beginning of 2004 Grafite was signed by Brazilian top-side São Paulo FC, where he won the 2005 São Paulo State Championship, his first title.

In the same month Grafite made it worldwide into the headlines. In the Libertadores group match against the Argentine club Quilmes AC in the Morumbi Stadium he had a hefty encounter with defender Leandro Desábato whom he accused of racial slurs. Together with the Argentine midfielder Carlos Arano, who tried to intervene, he was sent off. Still during the match, Grafite reported the incident to the police, which arrested Desábato after the final whistle on his way to the locker room for racial insults and moved him to a police station for a further interview. After two days in police arrest Desábato was released against a bond and was allowed to return to Argentina.

Another exciting event for Grafite in this month was an invitation by the coach of the Brazil national team, Carlos Alberto Parreira to join the Seleção for the first time when it lined up for a friendly against Guatemala on 27 April in São Paulo's Pacaembu Stadium. Grafite contributed with one goal to the 3–0 score.

Until the end of the year Grafite could collect two more titles, winning the Copa Libertadores and the Club World Championship. Whilst he was not in the line-ups of any of the two Libertadores finals against Atlético Paranaense, he played in the last 15 minutes of the Club World Championship final in November in Tokyo against Liverpool, which São Paulo won 1–0.

=== Move to Europe ===
In January 2006 French club Le Mans UC 72, promoted to the first division in 2005, hired the Brazilian striker. Grafite debuted in February, and until the end of the season he had scored three times in eleven league matches. 2006–07 he was in the league line-up of MUC in 34 of 38 matches and scored 12 goals, which made him the top goal-getter of the club – which finished the season 12th – and third in France over all. At the beginning of the 2007–08 season he played six more league matches for Le Mans, scoring a further two goals, before being transferred to German Bundesliga club VfL Wolfsburg on 31 August, the last day of the transfer period, for a fee of about €5.6 million.

=== VfL Wolfsburg ===
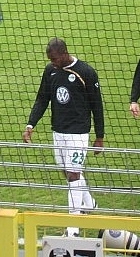
Grafite with Wolfsburg in 2008

With Wolfsburg he signed a four-year contract, which he extended in 2009 until 2012. In his first season, he scored 11 times in 24 matches, and was also his team's top scorer. At the end of the following season the Felix Magath-managed Wolves were champions of Germany for the first time, and Grafite contributed with 28 goals in 25 matches, making him the league's top striker. Alongside his partner in the attack, Edin Džeko, who scored 26 goals, he formed the most prolific strike partnership in Bundesliga history, together totalling 54 goals, topping the achievements of Gerd Müller and Uli Hoeneß, who scored 53 goals in the 1971–72 season.

One of the goals of Wolfsburg's 5–1 against Bayern Munich, when he dribbled past several defenders and then finished with a slow shot with his heel, even brought him international attention. In Germany it was voted Goal of the Year. In October 2009, FIFA announced the introduction of the FIFA Puskás Award, awarded to the player who has scored the "most beautiful goal" over the past year. The inaugural Puskás Award went to Cristiano Ronaldo and Grafite's effort was rated third. Grafite, however, was rewarded with the highest individual honour German football has to bestow, and was voted Footballer of the Year, and became only the third foreigner to achieve this.

By ESPN Brasil he also received the Prêmio Futebol no Mundo award as the promising discovery of the 2008–09 season, as well as the top goalscorer award of the same season.

In VfL Wolfsburg's first ever Champions League match against CSKA Moscow on 15 September 2009, Grafite scored a hat-trick to beat the Russian side 3–1 at the Volkswagen Arena in Wolfsburg, becoming only the sixth player to score a hat-trick on his Champions League debut. In 107 German top-flight matches Grafite netted 59 times.

=== Al-Ahli Dubai ===
On 19 June 2011, Grafite announced he had signed with Al Ahli in the UAE Pro-League on a two-year contract.

Grafite was honored as the International Player of the Year for the 2012–13 UAE Pro-League on 26 May 2013, edging out top goalscorer Asamoah Gyan. On 28 May, he scored Al-Ahli's second goal in their 4–3 victory over Al Shabab Al Arabi in the final of the 2013 President's Cup.

Grafite scored a total of 63 goals in 79 matches for Al Ahli.

=== Santa Cruz ===
On 1 July 2015, Grafite was signed once again by Brazilian Série B club Santa Cruz, on a year-long contract. The club announced that he would wear shirt number 23. He arrived in the middle of the competition and scored 7 times in 15 matches, which helped promote Santa Cruz to the first division after 10 years without playing in it.

In August 2017, after a spell at Atlético Paranaense, he rejoined Santa Cruz.

In January 2018, Grafite announced his retirement.

== International career ==
On 2 March 2010, after almost five years since his debut for the national team, he made his second appearance, coming on as a substitution for Adriano in the game against Republic of Ireland at the Emirates Stadium in London. He was called up to the squad after Luís Fabiano was injured. On 11 May, Dunga named Grafite among his 23-man 2010 FIFA World Cup squad. Grafite made one appearance at the tournament, replacing Luís Fabiano for the last five minutes of the 0–0 draw with Portugal in the last Group match.

== Career statistics ==
=== Club ===
Appearances and goals by club, season and competition
Club	Season	League			Cup		Continental		Other		Total	
Club	Season	Division	Apps	Goals	Apps	Goals	Apps	Goals	Apps	Goals	Apps	Goals
Santa Cruz	2001	Série A	22	5			—		—		22	5
Grêmio	2002	Série A	6	0			3	0	—		9	0
Anyang LG Cheetahs	2003	K League	9	0	0	0	—		—		9	0
Goiás	2003	Série A	20	12			—		—		20	12
São Paulo	2004	Série A	38	17	0	0	15	5	—		53	22
São Paulo	2005	Série A	6	0	0	0	9	4	2	0	17	4
São Paulo	Total		44	17	0	0	24	9	2	0	70	26
Le Mans	2005–06	Ligue 1	11	3	0	0	—		1	0	12	3
Le Mans	2006–07	Ligue 1	34	12	1	1	—		3	2	38	15
Le Mans	2007–08	Ligue 1	6	2	0	0	—		—		6	2
Le Mans	Total		51	17	1	1	0	0	4	2	56	20
VfL Wolfsburg	2007–08	Bundesliga	24	11	4	1	—		—		28	12
VfL Wolfsburg	2008–09	Bundesliga	25	28	3	4	3	3	—		31	35
VfL Wolfsburg	2009–10	Bundesliga	30	11	2	1	8	6	—		40	18
VfL Wolfsburg	2010–11	Bundesliga	28	9	3	1	—		—		31	10
VfL Wolfsburg	Total		107	59	12	7	11	9	—		130	75
Al Ahli	2011–12	UAE Pro-League	21	16	—		—		12	13	33	29
Al Ahli	2012–13	UAE Pro-League	20	24	—		—		2	0	22	24
Al Ahli	2013–14	UAE Pro-League	25	19	—		6	3	8	4	39	26
Al Ahli	2014–15	UAE Pro-League	13	4	—		—		6	3	19	7
Al Ahli	Total		79	63	—		6	3	28	20	113	86
Al Sadd	2014–15	Qatar Stars League	9	4	—		8	1	—		17	5
Santa Cruz	2015	Série B	15	7	0	0	—		—		15	7
Santa Cruz	2016	Série A	31	13	0	0	4	3	—		35	16
Santa Cruz	Total		46	20	0	0	4	3	0	0	50	23
Paranaense	2017	Série A	0	0	0	0	9	1	—		9	1
Santa Cruz	2017	Série B	15	3	0	0	—		—		15	3
Career total			408	200	13	8	65	26	34	22	520	256

State League

Season	Club	League	Apps	Goals
2004	São Paulo	Paulista	9	5
2005	São Paulo	Paulista	17	8
2006	São Paulo	Paulista	2	1

=== International ===
Score and result list Brazil's goal tally first, score column indicates score after Grafite goal.

International goal scored by Grafite
No.	Date	Venue	Opponent	Score	Result	Competition
1	27 April 2005	Estádio do Pacaembu, São Paulo, Brazil	Guatemala	3–0	3–0	Friendly

== Honours ==
São Paulo

- Copa Libertadores: 2005
- FIFA Club World Cup: 2005

VfL Wolfsburg

- Bundesliga: 2008–09

Al Ahli'

- UAE President's Cup: 2012–13
- UAE League: 2013–14
- UAE Super Cup: 2013
- UAE League Cup: 2011–12, 2013–14

Santa Cruz

- Campeonato Pernambucano: 2016
- Copa do Nordeste: 2016

Individual

- Bola de Prata: 2003
- Bundesliga Player of the Month: March 2009
- Bundesliga top scorer: 2008–09
- VDV Bundesliga Player of the Season: 2008–09
- kicker Bundesliga Team of the Season: 2008–09
- Goal of the Year (Germany): 2009
- Footballer of the Year (Germany): 2009
