= Waheed Ismail =

Emirati footballer (born 1983)

Personal information
- Full name: Waheed Ismail Mohammed
- Date of birth: 1 July 1983 (age 43)
- Place of birth: United Arab Emirates
- Height: 1.74 m (5 ft 8 1/2 in)
- Position: Defender

Youth career
- Al-Wasl

Senior career*
Years	Team	Apps	(Gls)
2003–2019	Al-Wasl	246	(2)
2009	→ Al-Shabab (loan)	11	(0)
2019–2020	Ajman	6	(0)
- * Club domestic league appearances and goals

Waheed Ismael (Arabic: وحيد إسماعيل; born 1 July 1983) is an Emirati footballer who played as a defender.
