= Yasser Salem =

Emirati footballer (born 1986)

Personal information
- Full name: Yasser Salem Mohamed Hassan
- Date of birth: 12 October 1986 (age 40)
- Place of birth: United Arab Emirates
- Height: 1.77 m (5 ft 10 in)
- Position: Right back

Youth career
- Al Urooba

Senior career*
Years	Team	Apps	(Gls)
2005–2008	Al Urooba		
2008–2017	Al-Wasl		
2017–2019	Dibba Al-Fujairah	36	(0)
2019–2020	Al-Fujairah	7	(0)
2020–2021	Al Urooba		
- * Club domestic league appearances and goals

Yasser Salem (Arabic: ياسر سالم; born 12 October 1986) is an Emirati footballer who played as a right back.
