= Hassan Ali (footballer, born 1981) =

Emirati footballer (born 1981)

Personal information
- Full name: Hassan Ali Ibrahim Ali Ahmad Al-Balooshi
- Date of birth: December 16, 1981 (age 44)
- Place of birth: UAE
- Height: 1.71 m (5 ft 7 in)
- Position: Midfielder

Senior career*
Years	Team	Apps	(Gls)
2001–2011	Al Ahli		
2011–2013	Al Wasl	33	(0)
2013–2014	Emirates Club		
2014–2016	Al Ittihad Kalba		

International career
2004–2008	UAE	7	(0)
- * Club domestic league appearances and goals

Hassan Ali Ibrahim Ali Ahmad Al-Balooshi (Arabic: حسن علي ابراهيم علي أحمد البلوشي, born December 16, 1981) is a football player from the United Arab Emirates (UAE). He currently plays for Emirates Club.
