= 31st GCC Club Cup =

2016 GCC Club Cup
كأس الأندية الخليجية

Tournament details
- Teams: 12 (from AFC/UAFA confederations)

The 31st GCC Club Cup (Arabic: كأس الأندية الخليجية) was set to be the 31st edition of the GCC Club Cup for clubs of the Gulf Cooperation Council nations.

On 6 August 2015, it was announced that the competition would be postponed until February 2016 due to the suspension of Kuwait from FIFA. Later in January 2016, it was announced that the competition would not take place at all due to a lack of sponsorship.

== Teams ==
Entrants
Team	Qualifying method	App	Last App
Group stage direct entrants (Groups A–D)
(Bahrain) Al-Hidd	2015 Bahraini King's Cup winners	1st	none
(Bahrain) Manama	2nd 2014–15 Bahrain First Division League	3rd	2015
(Kuwait) Al-Arabi	2nd 2014–15 Kuwaiti Premier League	8th	2012
(Kuwait) Al-Jahra	3rd 2014–15 Kuwaiti Premier League	3rd	2015
(Oman) Sur	3rd 2014–15 Oman Professional League	1st	none
(Oman) Al-Nasr	4th 2014–15 Oman Professional League	5th	2015

Entrants
Team	Qualifying method	App	Last App
Group stage direct entrants (Groups A–D)
(Qatar) Al-Ahli	5th 2014–15 Qatar Stars League	2nd	2012
(Qatar) Al-Arabi	8th 2014–15 Qatar Stars League	7th	2015
(Saudi Arabia) Al-Fateh	6th 2014–15 Saudi Professional League	1st	none
(Saudi Arabia) Al-Faisaly	7th 2014–15 Saudi Professional League	2nd	2015
(United Arab Emirates) Al-Wasl	6th 2014–15 UAE Pro-League	3rd	2013
(United Arab Emirates) Baniyas	8th 2014–15 UAE Pro-League	3rd	2013

== Group stage ==
The group stage was drawn before the tournament got cancelled.

Group A

- (Kuwait) Al-Jahra
- (Bahrain) Manama
- (Oman) Al-Nasr
- (Qatar) Al-Ahli

Group B

- (Kuwait) Al-Arabi
- (Saudi Arabia) Al-Fateh
- (United Arab Emirates) Baniyas
- (Qatar) Al-Arabi

Group C

- (United Arab Emirates) Al-Wasl
- (Bahrain) Al-Hidd
- (Oman) Sur
- (Saudi Arabia) Al-Faisaly
