= Benjamin Feindouno =

Guinean footballer (1983–2025)

Personal information
- Date of birth: 17 February 1983 (age 43)
- Place of birth: Conakry, Guinea
- Date of death: 2025
- Place of death: La Roche-sur-Yon, France
- Height: 1.76 m (5 ft 9 in)
- Position: Striker

Youth career
- –2000: Hirondelles de Conakry

Senior career*
Years	Team	Apps	(Gls)
2000–2003	Beauvais Oise	1	(0)
2003–2004	Lorient B		
2004–2007	Vendée Poiré sur Vie		
2007–2008	Saint-Lô		
2008–2009	Vendée Luçon		
2009–2012	La Roche VF		
- * Club domestic league appearances and goals

Benjamin Feindouno (born 17 February 1983 – 2025) was a Guinean professional footballer who played as a striker.

== Career ==
Born in Conakry, Feindouno began his career with Hirondelles de Conakry. In 2000 he was scouted by Beauvais Oise where he played his only professional game on 10 May 2003 against Metz in the Ligue 2, he left in July 2003 to sign with Lorient where he played for the reserve team. After one year with Lorient B he signed with Vendée Poiré sur Vie on 1 July 2004.

On 7 August 2007, Feindouno left Vendée Poiré sur Vie and signed with Saint-Lô. After a successful year with Saint-Lô, in which he scored 14 goals and made 10 assists in the fifth tier, he signed a contract with fourth-tier side Vendée Luçon on 24 October 2008. In January 2009 he left Vendée Luçon to sign with La Roche VF.

== Personal life and death ==
Benjamin was the brother of midfielders Simon Feindouno and Pascal Feindouno.

He was found dead in his home in La Roche-sur-Yon on 26 August 2025 with his body in "an advanced state of decomposition".
