= Ali Hassan (footballer) =

Mozambican footballer (1964–2026)

Personal information
- Full name: Ali Mahomed Hassan
- Date of birth: 4 June 1964
- Place of birth: Maputo, Portuguese Mozambique
- Date of death: 13 January 2026 (aged 61)
- Place of death: Maputo, Mozambique
- Height: 1.83 m (6 ft 0 in)
- Position: Defensive midfielder

Senior career*
Years	Team	Apps	(Gls)
1988–1991	Sporting CP	22	(0)
1991–1992	Vitória Setúbal	12	(0)
1992–1993	Amora	9	(0)
1993–1995	Académico de Viseu	46	(1)
1995–1996	CD Torres Novas	16	(1)
Total		105	(2)

International career
1989–1996	Mozambique	5	(0)
- * Club domestic league appearances and goals

Ali Mahomed Hassan (/ˈhʌsən/ HUSS-ən; 4 June 1964 – 13 January 2026) was a Mozambican professional footballer who played as a defensive midfielder. He made five appearances for the Mozambique national team from 1989 to 1996. He was also named in Mozambique's squad for the 1996 African Cup of Nations tournament. Hassan died in Maputo on 13 January 2026, at the age of 61.
