= Abdullah Saqr =

Emirati football manager (born 1952)

Personal information
- Full name: Abdullah Saqr Ahmed
- Date of birth: 1952 (age 73–74)
- Place of birth: Dubai, United Arab Emirates

Managerial career
- Years: Team
- 2001: United Arab Emirates
- 2006–2007: Al Shabab

Abdullah Saqr Ahmed (Arabic: عبدالله صقر; born 1952) is an Emirati former football player and manager.

== Life and career ==
Saqr was born in 1952 in Dubai, United Arab Emirates. He was a footballer. In 2001, he was appointed manager of the United Arab Emirates national team. He managed the team for 2002 FIFA World Cup qualification. In 2006, he was appointed manager of Al Shabab. He has worked as a director of a youth football academy. He was part of the United Arab Emirates national football team technical staff for the 6th Arabian Gulf Cup, 7th Arabian Gulf Cup, 8th Arabian Gulf Cup, and 9th Arabian Gulf Cup.

Saqr published a collection of short stories titled "Al-Khashaba" in 1975, at the age of twenty-three. He has also written poetry. "Al-Khashaba" has been regarded as the first collection of short stories in Emirati literature. However, it was not received well at the time by Emirati society as it had a progress viewpoint on societal issues at the time. Because of this, he focused more on football. He has been married. He has children.
