= Eid Baroot =

Emirati football managers

Personal information
- Full name: Eid Ismail Baroot

Managerial career
- Years: Team
- 2008: Emirates
- 2008–2009: Al Dhafra
- 2010: Emirates
- 2010–2011: Al-Nasr
- 2013: Al Wasl
- 2013: Emirates
- 2014–2015: Al-Shaab
- 2016: Fujairah
- 2019: Emirates
- 2023–2024: Al Jazirah Al Hamra
- 2024–: Dibba Al Fujairah

Eid Ismail Baroot (Arabic: عيد إسماعيل باروت) is an Emirati football manager.
