= Al Dhafra FC =

Emirati professional football club

Al Dhafra
- Full name: Al Dhafra Football Club
- Nicknames: Al Fursan Al Gharib (The Western Knights)
- Founded: 2000
- Ground: Al Dhafra Stadium
- Capacity: 5,020
- Owner: Hamdan bin Zayed bin Sultan Al Nahyan
- Head coach: Alen Horvat
- League: UAE Pro League
- 2025–26: 12th of 14
- Website: www.dfsc.ae/dhafra
Home colours	Away colours

Al Dhafra FC (Arabic: نادي الظفرة لكرة القدم) is an Emirati professional football club based in Madinat Zayed that competes in the UAE First Division League.

Their futsal club participated in AFC Futsal Club Championship.

== History ==
Al Dhafra FC was established in 2000, as part of a policy to promote sports across the country and the Al Dhafra region of Abu Dhabi had no team, so Al Dhafra is the first and only club to be located in the western region. For most of its history the club was classified as a semi-professional club according to the UAE Pro League committee and did not have licenses to compete in the AFC competitions but the team had continued to appeal for a license since qualifying for the UAE President's Cup for the first time in 2019. Around 2020 the club finally obtained their licenses, thus all pro league teams can compete in AFC competitions.

== Honours ==
- President's Cup
  - Runners-up (1): 2018–19
  - Finalist (1): 2019–20
- UAE First Division League
  - Champions (3): 2001–02, 2006–07, 2024-25
- UAE Vice Presidents Cup
  - Champions (1): 2012

== Season-by-season record ==
Season	Lvl.	Tms.	Pos.	President's Cup	League Cup
2008–09	1	12	8th	Semi-Finals	First Round
2009–10	1	12	9th	Quarter-Finals	First Round
2010–11	1	12	12th	Round of 16	First Round
2011–12	2	8	4th	Round of 16	—
2012–13	1	14	8th	Round of 16	First Round
2013–14	1	14	8th	Semi-Finals	Semi-Finals
2014–15	1	14	11th	Semi-Finals	First Round
2015–16	1	14	8th	Round of 16	First Round
2016–17	1	14	7th	Round of 16	First Round
2017–18	1	14	10th	Round of 16	First Round
2018–19	1	14	10th	Runner-ups	First Round
2019–20^{a}	1	14	7th	Finalists	First Round
2020–21	1	14	11th	Quarter-Finals	First Round
2021–22	1	14	12th	Round of 16	First Round
2022–23	1	14	14th	Round of 16	Quarter-Finals
2023–24	2	16	8th		
2024–25	2	14	1st		
2025–26	1	14			

_{Notes 2019–20 UAE football season was cancelled due to the COVID-19 pandemic in the United Arab Emirates.}

== Players ==
As of 18 January 2026

Note: Flags indicate national team as defined under FIFA eligibility rules; some limited exceptions apply. Players may hold more than one non-FIFA nationality.

No.	Pos.	Nation	Player
1	GK	UAE	Mazen Saleh
3	DF	UAE	Dramane Koumare (on loan from Al-Ain)
4	DF	BRA	Vinicius Serafim
5	MF	UAE	Mansor Al-Harbi
6	DF	TOG	Ezeckiel Noumonvi
8	MF	GHA	Zackariah Mohammed
9	FW	GUI	Sory Kaba
10	MF	ALB	Regi Lushkja
11	FW	MAR	Mohamed El Khaloui
12	MF	UAE	Abdullah Fadaq
14	MF	UAE	Khaled Ba Wazir
15	DF	UAE	Abdullah Al-Karbi
16	FW	UAE	Mohammed Al-Hammadi
17	GK	UAE	Eisa Hooti (on loan from Kalba)
18	DF	UAE	Yousef Ayman
19	FW	SYR	Abdullah Batal
20	DF	UAE	Leonard Amesimeku
21	MF	UAE	Rostand Djooh

No.	Pos.	Nation	Player
22	MF	UAE	Rayan Yaslam
23	DF	UAE	Ibrahim Al-Hosani
26	DF	UAE	Yousef Al-Marzouqi (on loan from Al Jazira)
28	FW	GAM	Muhamed Suwareh
30	GK	UAE	Abdullah Sultan
31	MF	BRA	Vittor Richardh
33	DF	BRA	Samir
39	DF	BRA	Zé Welinton
44	GK	SYR	Amjad Al-Sayed
55	GK	UAE	Sultan Al-Zaabi
77	MF	TUN	Adem Ben Fajria
80	MF	BRA	Rodriguinho
88	GK	SEN	Dominique Mendy
99	FW	BRA	Marcelinho
—	MF	COD	Branham Kabala
—	FW	BRA	Arielson
—	FW	UAE	Zayed Al-Ameri

=== Out on loan ===
Note: Flags indicate national team as defined under FIFA eligibility rules; some limited exceptions apply. Players may hold more than one non-FIFA nationality.

No.	Pos.	Nation	Player
—	MF	UAE	Khalil Ibrahim (on loan to United)

Players with Multiple Nationalities

- (United Arab Emirates) (Cameroon) Rostand Djooh
- (United Arab Emirates) (Comoros) Mohammed Al-Hammadi
- (United Arab Emirates) (Oman) Mazen Saleh
- (United Arab Emirates) (Ghana) Leonard Amesimeku
- (United Arab Emirates) (Mali) Dramane Koumare

== Coaching staff ==
Position	Staff
Head coach	(Croatia) Alen Horvat
Assistant coach	(United Arab Emirates) Ahmed Al Hammadi
Goalkeeper coach	(Portugal) Alexandre Lopes
Fitness coach	Vacant
Analyst	Vacant
Doctor	(United Arab Emirates) Salem Mohammed
Physiotherapists	Vacant
Interpreter	Vacant
Team administrator	(United Arab Emirates) Khamis Al Mazrouei
Team manager	(United Arab Emirates) Sultan Al Hammadi
Technical director	(Bahrain) Ahmed Kamal Ahmed

== Managerial history ==
Name	Nat.	From	To	Ref.
Piet Hamberg	(Netherlands)	2003	2004	
Sebastião Rocha	(Brazil)	2005	2006	
Ammar Souayah	(Tunisia)	May 2007	November 2007	
Ayman El Ramadi	(Egypt)	November 2007	August 2008	
Mohammad Kwid	(Syria)	September 2008	December 2008	
Eid Baroot	(United Arab Emirates)	December 2008	June 2009	
Laurent Banide	(France)	July 2009	February 2010	
Slobodan Halilović	(Serbia)	February 2010	March 2010	
Michel Decastel	(Switzerland)	March 2010	November 2010	
Alexandre Guimarães	(Costa Rica)	November 2010	April 2011	
Mohammad Kwid	(Syria)	April 2011	June 2011	
Baltemar Brito	(Brazil)	June 2011	December 2011	
Magdy Mostafa	(Egypt)	December 2011	May 2012	
Džemal Hadžiabdić	(Bosnia and Herzegovina)	May 2012	December 2012	
Laurent Banide	(France)	December 2012	April 2013	
Abdullah Mesfer	(United Arab Emirates)	April 2013	May 2014	
Anel Karabeg	(Bosnia and Herzegovina)	May 2014	September 2014	
Marin Ion	(Romania)	September 2014	January 2015	
Laurent Banide	(France)	January 2015	November 2015	
Mohammad Kwid	(Syria)	November 2015	January 2018	
Gjoko Hadžievski	(North Macedonia)	January 2018	May 2018	
Vuk Rašović	(Serbia)	May 2018	September 2020	
Mohammad Kwid	(Syria)	September 2020	October 2020	
Aleksandar Veselinović	(Serbia)	October 2020	January 2021	
Mohammad Kwid	(Syria)	January 2021	October 2021	
Rogério Micale	(Brazil)	October 2021	March 2022	
Badr Al Idrissi	(Morocco)	March 2022	May 2022	
Nebojša Vignjević	(Serbia)	July 2022	October 2022	
Aleksandar Veselinović	(Serbia)	October 2022	February 2023	
Badr Al Idrissi	(Morocco)	February 2023	August 2023	
Abdullah Mesfer	(United Arab Emirates)	August 2023	November 2023	
Paulo Comelli	(Brazil)	December 2023	February 2024	
Alen Horvat	(Croatia)	March 2024	May 2025	
Željko Petrović	(Montenegro)	May 2025	Present	

== See also ==
- List of football clubs in the United Arab Emirates
