= Paulo Júnior (footballer, born 1984) =

Brazilian footballer (1984–2018)

Personal information
- Full name: Paulo Roberto Morais Júnior
- Date of birth: 25 February 1984
- Place of birth: Natal, Brazil
- Date of death: 2 February 2018 (aged 33)
- Height: 1.84 m (6 ft 0 in)
- Position: Forward

Youth career
- 2004: Potiguar

Senior career*
Years	Team	Apps	(Gls)
2004	Baraunas	?	(5)
2005	ABC	?	(0)
2005	Baraunas	?	(5)
2005–2006	CO Saint-Dizier	?	(14)
2007	Mineiros	?	(11)
2007	Potiguar	?	(2)
2007–2009	Al-Urooba	?	(46)
2009–2010	Dibba Al Fujairah	?	(23)
2011	Al-Thaid	?	(12)
2004	Baraunas	?	(3)
2011–2012	Dibba Al Fujairah	?	(13)
2012	Incheon United	5	(1)
2012–2013	Fujairah	13	(10)
2013	Al-Nahda	11	(3)
2014–2015	Al-Hidd		
- * Club domestic league appearances and goals

Paulo Roberto Morais Júnior (25 February 1984 – 2 February 2018), commonly known as Paulo, was a Brazilian footballer who played as a forward.

He played for Baraunas in his native Brazil as well as Fujairah SC in the UAE and K-League side Incheon United, for Al-Nahda Club and for Al-Hidd. He died in 2018 from leukemia.
