= Laurent Banide =

French football manager (born 1968)

Personal information
- Date of birth: 26 January 1968 (age 58)
- Place of birth: Alès, France

Team information
- Current team: Monaco (women's head coach)

Youth career
- Years: Team
- 1975–1976: Monaco
- 1986–1988: Marseille

Managerial career
- 1990–1993: Monaco (youth)
- 1993–2005: Monaco (youth)
- 2005–2006: Monaco (assistant)
- 2006–2007: Monaco
- 2008: Umm Salal
- 2008–2009: Kuwait SC
- 2009–2010: Al Dhafra
- 2010: Al-Nasr
- 2011: Monaco
- 2012: Al Kharaitiyat
- 2012–2013: Al Dhafra
- 2013: Al-Wasl
- 2013–2014: Al-Orobah
- 2015: Al Dhafra
- 2016: Kuwait SC
- 2018: Umm Salal
- 2019: Oldham Athletic
- 2022–: Monaco (women)

Laurent Banide (born 26 January 1968) is a French football manager who coaches Monaco's women's side.

== Coaching career ==
Born in Alès, Banide had his first job in management with the youth of AS Monaco FC, as his father Gérard led the first team. Banide was assistant to László Bölöni when on 23 October 2006, after losing seven of ten games at the start of the season, the Romanian was sacked and Banide took over. At 38, he was the youngest coach in Ligue 1. On 4 June 2007, after finishing the season in 9th, ten places above their position at his appointment, the principality club dismissed Banide.

He then coached Umm Salal and Kuwait SC. In February 2010 he left Al Dhafra FC to join Al-Nasr SC, replacing German colleague Frank Pagelsdorf.

On 10 January 2011, Banide returned to Monaco. He succeeded Guy Lacombe at a club ranked 17th that had been eliminated from the Coupe de France by fifth-tier Chambéry. The team were relegated to Ligue 2, and in early September he was sacked six games into the new season, leaving them second from bottom.

After returning to, and subsequently departing, Qatari side Umm Salal, he was appointed head coach of English League Two side Oldham Athletic on 11 June 2019, signing a one-year deal with the club. He was sacked on 19 September after winning only two out of eleven matches in charge.

In 2022, Banide was appointed head coach of the women's side of Monaco.
