= Simon Feindouno =

Guinean footballer

Personal information
- Date of birth: 15 August 1985 (age 41)
- Place of birth: Conakry, Guinea
- Height: 1.74 m (5 ft 9 in)
- Position: Attacking midfielder

Senior career*
Years	Team	Apps	(Gls)
2002	Nice II	2	(0)
2002–2008	Lens II	87	(20)
2006–2007	→ Istres (loan)	14	(1)
2008–2009	Istres	51	(13)
2010–2011	Kalba	18	(5)
2011–2013	Dubai Club	33	(2)
2013–2014	Ajman Club	25	(9)
2014–2015	Al-Shaab CSC	21	(7)
2015–2016	Kalba	12	(3)
2016–2017	Al-Arabi (UAE)	16	(8)
2018–2019	Masafi		

International career
2008	Guinea U23	7	(3)
- * Club domestic league appearances and goals as of 16:17, 25 June 2013 (UTC)

Simon Feindouno (born 15 August 1985) is a Guinean footballer who plays as a midfielder or forward. He is capable of playing as an attacking midfielder, winger, or striker.

== Career ==
Born in Conakry, Guinea, Feindouno began his professional career 2001 with OGC Nice and was transferred to RC Lens in 2002. In January 2007 was loaned out to FC Istres with a purchase option and the club pulled the option and he moved permanent in January 2008 to Istres for free.

Feindouno scored nine goals in 25 2013–14 UAE Pro League matches for Ajman Club.

He was in the extended squad from Guinea national football team and was formerly member of the U-23 team from his country Guinea.

== Personal life ==
Simon is Pascal's and Benjamin Feindouno's younger brother.
