= Mariano Donda =

Argentine footballer

Personal information
- Full name: Mariano Martín Donda
- Date of birth: 25 March 1982 (age 44)
- Place of birth: Buenos Aires, Argentina
- Height: 1.78 m (5 ft 10 in)
- Position: Midfielder

Senior career*
Years	Team	Apps	(Gls)
2003–2007	Nueva Chicago	75	(7)
2007–2010	Bari	55	(3)
2010–2011	Godoy Cruz	22	(7)
2011–2014	Al Wasl	29	(6)
- * Club domestic league appearances and goals as of 14:31, 29 July 2011 (UTC)

Mariano Martín Donda (born 25 March 1982 in Buenos Aires) is an Argentine footballer. Donda holds European Union nationality.

Donda started his professional career with Nueva Chicago in 2003. The club were relegated from the Argentine Primera in 2004, but Donda chose to stay with the club and helped them to earn promotion back to the Primera in 2006. At the end of the 2006–07 season, Nueva Chicago were relegated after losing their promotion playoff, this defeat prompted Donda's move to join Bari.

On 26 July 2010, Donda terminated the contract with Bari in mutual consent.

Donda then joined the Emirates club Al Wasl for the 2011–12 season. He missed the entire 2012–13 season due to his knee injury.

== Honours ==
- Serie B: 2009
- Silver medal in GCC Champions League: 2012
