= Al Wasl F.C. =

Emirati professional football club

Al-Wasl
- Full name: Al-Wasl Football Club
- Nicknames: The Emperor (الإمبراطور); Cheetahs (الفهود)
- Founded: 1960; 66 years ago
- Ground: Zabeel Stadium
- Capacity: 8,439
- Owner: Ahmed bin Rashid Al Maktoum (until September 2026)
- Chairman: Ahmad Bin Shafar
- Head coach: Rui Vitória
- League: UAE Pro League
- 2025–26: UAE Pro League, 3rd of 14
- Website: www.alwaslsc.ae
Home colours	Away colours

Al-Wasl Football Club (Arabic: نادي الوصل لكرة القدم) is an Emirati professional football club based in Za'abeel, Dubai that competes in the UAE Pro League.

The club plays its home games at Zabeel Stadium. It is among the most successful clubs in the United Arab Emirates, having won eight UAE Pro League titles, most recently in the 2023–24 season.

The club gained significant international attention in 2011 and 2012, while Diego Maradona was the club's head coach.

== History ==
=== Foundation ===
The concept of establishing a football club in Zabeel emerged in 1958 following meetings among local residents. At the time, there were no grass fields to play on, as football was still not popular. The club was officially founded with the name Al-Zamalek in 1960, in the house of Bakheet Salem, located in Zabeel. Club members had to rent a small house and each paid 10 Dirhams in order to support the club.

In 1962, the club moved to different house owned by Madia bint Sultan under the patronage of Sheikh Ahmed bin Rashid Al Maktoum and Sheikh Butti Bin Maktoum Al Maktoum. Later, the team elected Ahmed Bin Rashid Al Maktoum to be their club president, he agreed and even participated with the team in matches.

Sheikh Mohammed Bin Rashid Al Maktoum was one of the players in Al-Zamalek, he played as a defender and was one of the best players in the team, winning many games before travelling to the United Kingdom to continue his studies. During this period, Al-Zamalek were arguably the best team in Dubai, winning against traditional giants like Al-Nasr 2–1, Al-Wahda 3–1, and the English Country Club in Dubai 3–2. They even played against teams outside Dubai like Ras Al Khaimah, winning the game with a crushing 6–1 result. Al-Zamalek won the 1966 Canada Dry Football Cup in Dubai, defeating Al-Shabab.

=== 1970s ===
In 1972, Sheikh Rashid Bin Saeed Al Maktoum, vice president of UAE and ruler of Dubai, privileged the club by building its first headquarters in Za'abeel. This headquarters is still in use, in the same location where Zabeel Stadium is located.

The UAE League was started in 1973, with Al-Zamalek as one of the inaugural members. It was placed in a six-team group with Al Nasr, Al Shaab, Al Shoala, Al Najah, and Al-Oruba. Al-Zamalek was eliminated; group champions Al-Oruba went on to win the inaugural league title. During this season, the team's manager was Zaki Osman, who was a former player for the Egyptian club Zamalek SC.

In 1974, there was a merger between the Al Shoula Club in the Al Fahidi region and the Al Orouba club in Jumeirah. The two teams' members and staff joined into Al-Zamalek, making it one of the biggest clubs in Dubai. The new team remained based in Zabeel.

During this merger, the club's identity was changed to symbolise a fresh start for the team. It was renamed Al-Wasl, meaning 'connection' in Arabic, which was a historical name for the city of Dubai, as the club connects the youth through sport and other cultural activities. The club's colour was changed to yellow, which no other team used in the country.

Al Wasl's first season as a new team was the 1974–1975 season. It played ten games in the season and lost five, won two, and drew three, finishing fourth in its six-team section. The next season was still tough for the newly-formed team, as they won four games, lost seven, and drew five, finishing sixth in the league out of nine teams. The next few seasons were trophy-less. Other Dubai-based teams, like Al-Nasr and Al-Ahli, enjoyed nationwide success, but Al Wasl still needed more time to develop its players and bring in new talent.

By the late 1970s, things were beginning to change for the team: more local young players were being added to the ranks of the youth teams, and the team was consistently playing better football. The Ghanaian football legend Mohammed Polo was signed to the team, where he enjoyed a prolific career.

=== 1980s ===
The 1980s were a golden age for Al Wasl. The team won the league five times, the most out of any team in the history of the league at the time. The decade began with the 1980 opening of Al Wasl's stadium, the Zabeel Stadium, located in Zabeel, Dubai. It held around 9,000 people, subsequently upgraded to a capacity of 25,000 by 2025.

During the 1980-81 season, the team was under the leadership of the Brazilian coach Valinhos. Around this time, the team went to an official training camp in Germany, where they trained and played friendly games against various German teams. From this training camp, the team gained vital knowledge and skills necessary to develop their playing style and experience to challenge for the league title and cups.

Later that year, a three-man group went to Brazil in order to scout a coach for the team and even players. Amongst these three men was Saeed Hareb. In Brazil, the men were introduced by a taxi driver to Gilson Nunes, who was a local assistant coach for the Brazilian national team. Gílson Nunes was flown back to Dubai and became the assistant coach for Al Wasl, under the leadership of Joel Santana.

Notable players of this time period include Fahad Khamees, (nicknamed "the dark cheetah"), a UAE national team player in the 1990 World Cup; Mohammed Polo, a Ghanaian forward who was nicknamed "the dribbling magician" and played with the club from 1979 to 1985; Zuhair Bakheet, who spent his entire 18-year career in Al Wasl and led the UAE national team to the World Cup, and goalkeeper Hamad Yousuf.

In the 1981–82 season, armed with the skills gained in the German training camp, the new coaches, new players, and young talents, Al Wasl won their maiden league title, leaving Al Ain in second place. Al Wasl clinched back-to-back league titles in the 1982-83 season, ending the season with 25 points and fortifying its position as one of the leaders of Emirati football. In the following season, Al Wasl came second, but the team was able to bounce back and win the league in 1984-85 with ease; Al Wasl lost that season's final of the President's Cup 2–0 against Sharjah.

Al Wasl finished second in the 1985–86 season, when its rival Al Nasr lifted the league with another two-point difference. Al Wasl was the runner-up of the 1985-86 President's cup, losing 2–0 against rivals Al Nasr.

In the 1986–87 season, Al Wasl won the UAE President's Cup for the first time, defeating Al Khaleej (now Khor Fakkan Club) 2–0. Al Wasl also finished second in the league, three points behind Sharjah. The club's consistent finishes near the top of the league standings during this period reflected its status as one of the leading teams in Emirati football.

In the same season, Al Wasl made it to the Asian Club Championship, but was eliminated in the qualifying stage. They qualified through their good performance in the Gulf Clubs' Champions League in the same year.

In 1987–88, Al Wasl won the league with an 18-point difference to clinch their fourth league title in six years, more than any other side in the UAE at the time; this record would stand until Al Ain secured their seventh title in 2001–02.

From 1988 to 1990, Al Wasl finished second for two more consecutive seasons, meaning that they now had come first or second for nine consecutive years. They also competed in the Asian Club Championship for the second time, getting eliminated in the qualifying stage once again.

=== 1990s ===
The 1990s saw Al Wasl's performance hindered greatly, in stark contrast to their performance in the 1980s. The 1990–91 season was cancelled in the UAE due to the events in Kuwait and the Gulf War. Things were back to normal for the 1991–1992 season, when Al Wasl lifted the league trophy for the fifth time. In the 1992–93 season, Al Wasl finished runner-up in the league and won the UAE Federation Cup.

They were also one of the Emirati teams nominated to compete in the Asian Club Championship. In the qualifying round, Al Wasl defeated Jordanian side Al Wehdat 7–1 on aggregate. Al Wasl won both games in its group, beating PAS Tehran of Iran 1–0, and a 10–0 victory against Wohaib FC of Pakistan, which was the highest winning-margin out of any game in Asian Championship history. In the semifinal of the Asian Championship, Al Wasl faced off against Al Shabab Riyadh, who were the strongest Saudi team at the time. The game ended with a 2–2 draw, but Al Wasl was defeated on penalties. Al Wasl defeated Yomiuri FC 4–3 to take third place in the competition.

Al Wasl experienced a dip in form, finishing 4th in the 1993-94 league table and losing the final of the Federation cup to Al Wahda 3–0. Al Wasl once again competed in the 1994-95 Asian Club Championship, losing in the quarterfinals; in 1995–96, Al Wasl finished second in the UAE league, three points behind Sharjah. In the following season, 1996–1997, Al Wasl won the league for the sixth time. During the final fixture, when Al Wasl lifted the league trophy, they introduced a unique celebration of bringing in a small model train and driving it onto the field. This was later called the Al Wasl train, and was an iconic celebration unique to Al Wasl.

It was around this time that Al Wasl gained the nickname "The Sun of the League". The reason being that despite Al Wasl's long absence from championships, it returns and wins once again, just like how the sun will always set, but come back and rise.

Al Wasl played in the 1998 Arab Club Cup, reaching the semifinal. They finished at the top of their group, defeating Al Ittihad 1–0 and a 0–0 draw with Al Tahaddi, before beating Al Wehdat 5–1. Al Wasl lost the semi-final 3–1 to WA Tlemcen, who eventually went on to win the championship.

Between 1999 and 2000, Al Wasl was named the UAE's Club of the Century. This was due to being the team who had won the most UAE League titles, six in total, and also being the best performing Emirati club in international competitions and the most frequently qualified Emirati team at international competitions.

=== 2000s ===
During the 2000s decade, Al Wasl won only three championships, but still gave good performances.

Al Wasl lost the final of the President's Cup in 2000 to Al Wahda and finished the league in 7th place. The club's star player Zuhair Bakhit retired from football in 2002, having spent his entire career in Al Wasl; other stars at the club during this decade included Rachid Daoudi of Morocco and Farhad Majidi of Iran, both of whom are regarded as international legends of their respective countries.

From the early to mid-2000s, Al Ain and Al Wehda dominated the league, but Al Wasl came second in group B behind Al Ahli when the league was split into a different format for the 2003–04 season. The following two seasons were disappointing, with Al Wasl finishing mid-table.

Under the leadership of Brazilian Zé Mário, the club, seemingly out of nowhere, took the 2006–07 league title with ease, losing only once in the whole season. Al Wasl only had two foreign players, both being Brazilian: striker Anderson Barbosa (who was on loan from Sharjah and also the league's top scorer with 18 goals) and midfielder Alexandre Oliveira. Al Wasl also lifted the President's Cup, after defeating Al Ain 4–1 in the Zayed Sports City Stadium, becoming one of the only clubs to achieve the double.

Al Wasl made their AFC Champions League debut in the 2007–08 season, as a result of winning the league title. However, they exited the competition in the group stage, with two wins, one draw, and three losses. In the league, the club did not come close to defending their league title, finishing in 7th place.

In the 2008–2009 season, Al Wasl finished seventh but still qualified for the GCC Club Cup, which was played during the 2009–2010 season. Al Wasl finished top of their group and qualified to the next round. In the semi-final, they faced off against Saudi club Al-Nassr and lost 3–1 away. The team struck back in the return fixture, taking down Al-Nassr 4–2 in extra time and advancing 4–2 on penalties.

During that game, Al-Nassr's doctor taunted Al Wasl fans, which upset them and caused a number of them to jump down to the field and start a fight with the doctor and players. As a result of this incident, Al Wasl fans were banned from the home leg of the final against Qatar SC. The first leg was played in Qatar, ending in a 2–2 draw; a 0-0 match in front of an empty stadium ensured Al-Wasl won the title on the away goals rule and were crowned champions of the Arabian Gulf.

Later that season, Al Wasl signed Spanish player Francisco Yeste, who stayed for a season. He was an audacious player with a strong performance at Al Wasl, one of which including scoring a goal from the halfway line. This goal was called "the fastest equaliser in football history."

=== 2010s ===
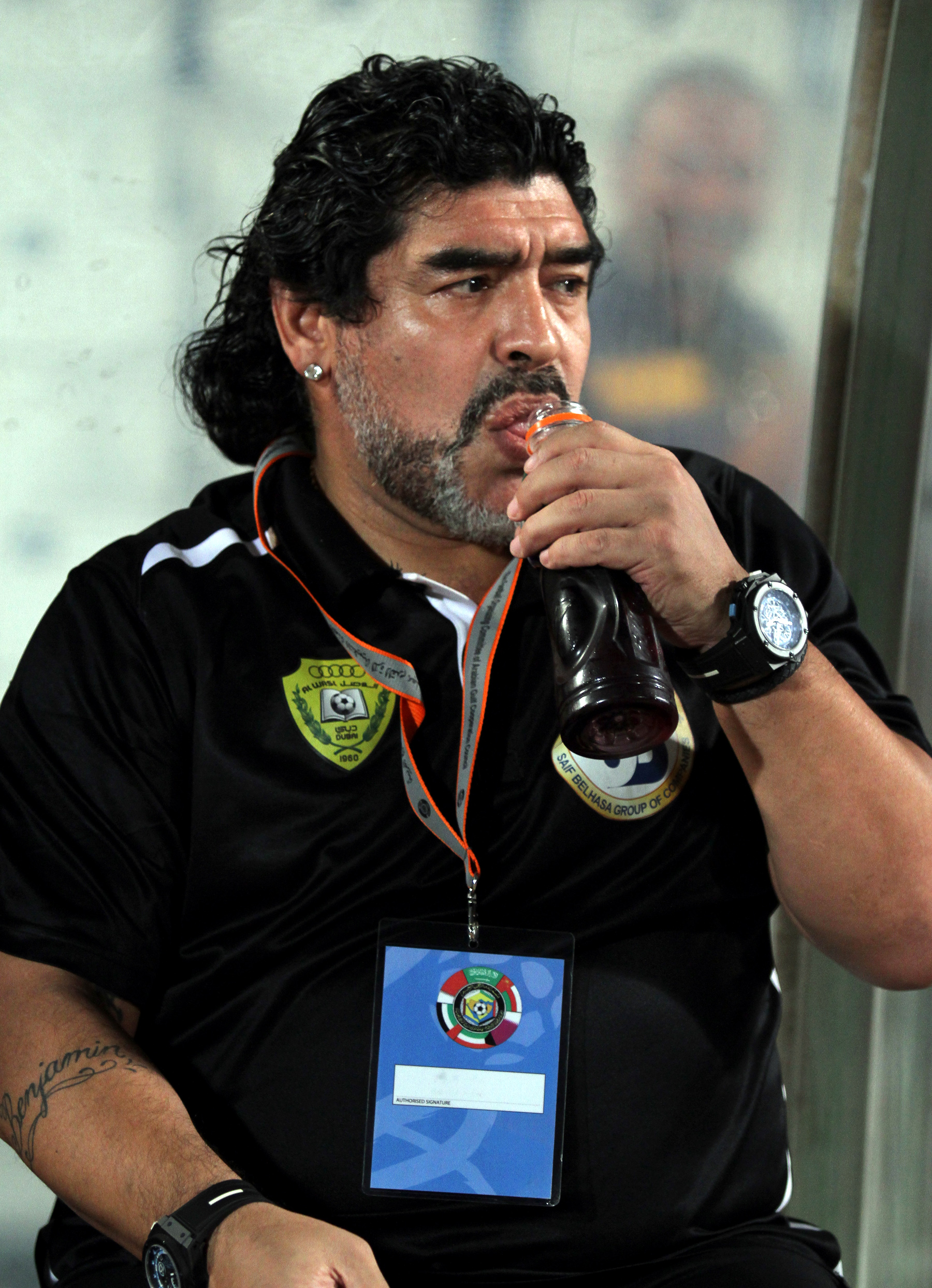
Diego Maradona during his tenure as Al Wasl's head coach

After the successes of earlier years, Al Wasl went into a state of decline and would constantly finish in the lower half of the league table, and did not win a single trophy in the entire decade.

In the 2010–11 season, Al Wasl reached the semi-finals of both the Etisalat Cup and President's Cup, and finished sixth in the league. The top scorer for the team was Fran Yeste, with 16 goals across all competitions.

Diego Maradona was appointed as the club's new coach in May 2011. This deal surprised many, and expectations were set high for the club. Maradona's stay at Al Wasl was difficult; they finished eighth in the league that season, were eliminated in the League Cup semifinals, and went out in the President's Cup quarterfinals. The team had a good campaign in the 2012 GCC Champions League, and reached their second final in three seasons. A 3-1 first leg victory away from home over Bahraini club Al-Muharraq was reversed at home; two Al Wasl players were sent off, they lost the match 3–1, and lost the title on penalties.

Maradona was very popular with the fans, and built bonds between himself and his players during his tenure. Al Wasl shirt sales increased all across the UAE and worldwide. By the end of the season, Maradona was sacked, but he remained a club legend. Two of the players he brought to the club, Juan Manuel Olivera and Mariano Donda, finished as the club's topscorers that season.

2012–13 was worse than the previous season; the team finished ninth in the league, were knocked out of the President's Cup at the round of 16 and were eliminated in the first round of the Etisalat League Cup. They went through three different managers this season. The first was French coach Bruno Metsu, who resigned in October 2012 after contracting colon cancer. He was succeeded by another French coach, Guy Lacombe, who was dismissed after less than four months in charge. His successor was Emirati Eid Baroot, who eventually finished off the season with average results.

In the 2013–14 season, Al Wasl's new kit sponsor was Adidas. Shikabala returned from his loan back to Al Zamalek, and this was Donda's last season with Al Wasl. For the 2014–2015 season, Al Wasl signed two new Brazilian players, Caio Canedo and Fábio Lima. They went on to provide a spectacular first season at Al Wasl, despite the team finishing 6th. The team qualified to the GCC Champions League but the tournament ended up being cancelled, and the team did not proceed.

Al Wasl finished sixth once again in the 2015–16 season; they qualified to the GCC Champions League, but it was again cancelled due to the Kuwaiti FA being suspended from FIFA and a lack of a sponsor for the tournament.

Rodolfo Arruabarrena was introduced to the team for the 2016–17 season, and he inspired Al Wasl to one of its best performances in recent times. Waheed Ismail was the club captain, and Caio and Lima gave notable performances. Other notable players include Hassan Zahran, Ali Salmon, and Hugo Viana. Al Wasl finished second behind Al Jazira; gaining qualification to the AFC Champions League for the following season. During this season, Al Wasl registered one of the greatest comebacks in UAE football history; the side was losing 3–0 but ended up making the result 4–3 in the last minutes. Al Wasl won the game with the highest score for this season, an 8–0 victory against Dibba al Fujairah.

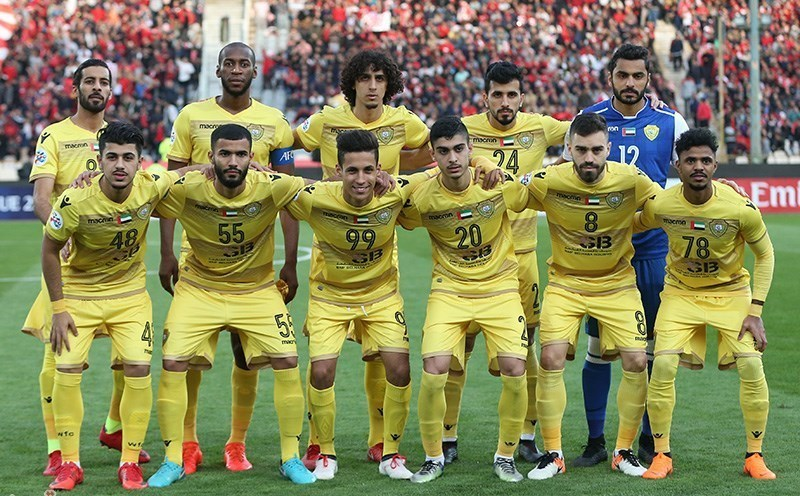
Al Wasl starting line up in the 2018 AFC Champions League against Iranian club Persepolis

Al Wasl finished third in the 2017–18 season and gained qualification to the AFC Champions League once again. During this season, Al Wasl made it to the final of the UAE President's Cup but lost 2–1 to Al Ain. They also qualified for the final of the league cup but lost to Al Wahda.

In the 2018–19 season, Al Wasl finished 9th in the league, but went on a good run in the Arab Champions League, notably taking down Egyptian giants Al Ahly on away goals, before being eliminated in the quarter final.

The 2019–2020 season was cancelled due to the COVID-19 pandemic.

=== 2020s ===
Al Wasl ended the 2020–21 season in 9th place. The succession of poor results led to mutual animosity between the club and its fans; the fans campaigned for a change in the administration and board of directors. A new administration was appointed for the 2021–22 season, led by Ahmad Bin Shafar. With the fans placated, attendances rose, and the team's spirit and performance improved—albeit only to 6th place in the league.

Al Wasl reached the semi-final of the 2022–23 President's Cup, narrowly losing 1–0 to Al Ain across two legs. The team finished 4th in that season's league.

The 2023–24 season was, by far, the most successful season for the team in the previous decade. Al Wasl lost only one game in the league and maintained first place from the start to the end of the season. The side lifted the President's Cup on 17 May, defeating their derby rivals Al Nasr 4–0 in front of a sold-out stadium with 25,000 fans. Al Wasl eventually clinched their 8th UAE Pro League title, following a 3–0 victory over second-place Shabab Al Ahli, with two games remaining.

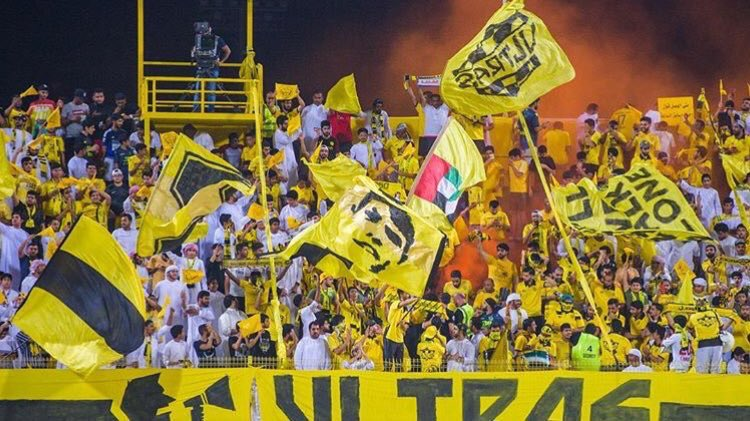
Al Wasl Ultras

The side began their 2024–25 season strongly, winning in their first ACL Elite game against Uzbekistan side Pakhtakor, and beating rivals Al Nasr 3–1 at home in the derby. After this game, the team's level started to drop, and they lost to reigning Asian champions Al Ain 4–2 away in the league. In Asia, they lost 2–0 to Saudi club Al Ahli at home. New signing Isaac Success helped the club stabilise their position, and they finished fourth in the UAE league.

== Rivalries ==
Al Wasl's main competitors are Al Nasr, who they compete with in the Bur Dubai Derby, and Al Ain, who they challenge in the 'UAE Classico'.

== Players ==
=== Current squad ===
As of UAE Pro-League:

Note: Flags indicate national team as defined under FIFA eligibility rules; some limited exceptions apply. Players may hold more than one non-FIFA nationality.

No.	Pos.	Nation	Player
1	GK	UAE	Abdullrahman Al-Ameri
4	DF	MAR	Soufiane Bouftini
5	DF	NGR	Ridwan Popoola
6	MF	MLI	Siaka Sidibe
7	FW	UAE	Ali Saleh
8	MF	UAE	Yahia Nader
9	FW	IRI	Mehdi Taremi
10	FW	UAE	Fábio Lima
12	DF	UAE	Abdulrahman Saleh
13	MF	PER	Renato Tapia
14	DF	BRA	Rodrigo
15	DF	UAE	Saša Ivković
16	DF	BRA	Hugo
17	GK	UAE	Suhail Abdulla
18	MF	SYR	Malek Janeer
19	MF	CPV	Serginho
20	FW	BRA	Matheus Saldanha
23	GK	CRO	Dinko Horkaš
25	DF	BRA	Gabriel Vareta
26	MF	GAB	Roy Mbongui

No.	Pos.	Nation	Player
30	MF	COL	Brahian Palacios
31	MF	UAE	Nicolás Giménez
32	GK	UAE	Mohamed Qayoudhi
34	DF	BRA	Adryelson
36	MF	UAE	Mohammed Shaaban
39	MF	SYR	Khaled Al-Hamoush
44	DF	UAE	Salem Al-Azizi
53	DF	UAE	Omar Haikal
59	DF	UAE	Atiq Esam
76	MF	UAE	Abdulla Ahmed
77	MF	BRA	Leandro Spadacio
78	FW	UAE	Rabee Hassan
79	DF	POR	Pedro Malheiro
83	MF	BRA	João Alves
88	MF	UAE	Abdulla Al-Shamsi
89	FW	UAE	Mohammed Al-Mehairi
96	FW	BRA	Renato Júnior
—	DF	BRA	Lucas Souza
—	DF	JPN	Takashi Uchino
—	MF	SUI	Cameron Puertas (on loan from Al-Qadsiah)

=== Out on loan ===
Note: Flags indicate national team as defined under FIFA eligibility rules; some limited exceptions apply. Players may hold more than one non-FIFA nationality.

No. / Pos. / Nation / Player; 21 / MF / CIV / Jean N'Guessan (on loan to Khor Fakkan)	No. / Pos. / Nation / Player; 90 / FW / CIV / Adama Diallo (on loan to Khor Fakkan)

Players with Multiple Nationalities

- (United Arab Emirates) (Brazil) Hugo
- (United Arab Emirates) (Brazil) Leandro Spadacio
- (United Arab Emirates) (Colombia) Brahian Palacios
- (United Arab Emirates) (Cape Verde) Serginho
- (United Arab Emirates) (Mali) Siaka Sidibe
- (United Arab Emirates) (Portugal) Pedro Malheiro

== Honours ==
=== Domestic competitions ===
- UAE Pro League: 8
  - Winner: 1981–82, 1982–83, 1984–85, 1987–88, 1991–92, 1996–97, 2006–07, 2023–24
- UAE President's Cup: 3
  - Winner: 1986–87, 2006–07, 2023–24
- UAE Federation Cup: 1
  - Winner: 1992–93
- The IFFHS named Al Wasl as the UAE's Club of the 20th Century.

=== Regional competitions ===
- GCC Champions League
  - Winners (1) : 2009–10
  - Runners-up (2): 2005, 2012
- Qatar–UAE Super Cup
  - Winners: (1) 2024–25
- Arab Club Champions Cup
  - Semi-finals: 1998
  - Quarter-finals: 2018–19

== Performance in AFC competitions ==
- AFC Champions League: 4 appearances

2008: Group stage
2018: Group stage
2019: Group stage
2024/2025 : Round of 16

- Asian Club Championship: 4 appearances

1986: Qualifying Stage
1989–90: Qualifying Stage
1992–93: Third Place
1994–95: Quarter finals

== Coaching staff ==
Position	Staff
Head coach	(Portugal) Rui Vitória
Assistant coach	(Portugal) Arnaldo Teixeira (Portugal) Serginho (United Arab Emirates) Faisal Mohammad
Goalkeeper coach	(Portugal) Luís Esteves
Fitness coach	(Greece) Nikolaos Giagou
Chief analyst	(England) Paul Mitchell

== Managerial history ==
^{*} Served as caretaker coach.

Name	Nat.	From	To	Ref.
Bakhit Salem	(Trucial States)	1960	1970	
Ismail Al-Jarman	(United Arab Emirates)	1971	1971	
Zaki Osman	(Egypt)	1972	1973	
Valinhos	(Brazil)	1980	1981	
Joel Santana	(Brazil)	1981	1986	
Hassan Shehata	(Egypt)	1986	1988	
Antônio Lopes	(Brazil)	1988	1989	
Gílson Nunes	(Brazil)	1989	1990	
Dimitri Davidović	(Socialist Federal Republic of Yugoslavia)	1991	1992	
Arthur Bernardes	(Brazil)	1996	1998	
Alain Laurier	(France)	1998	December 1998	
Paulo Campos	(Brazil)	January 1999	May 1999	
Henryk Kasperczak	(Poland)	September 1999	February 2000	
Alain Laurier*	(France)	March 2000	May 2000	
Josef Hickersberger	(Austria)	June 2000	June 2001	
Johan Boskamp	(Netherlands)	July 2001	2002	
Martín Lasarte	(Uruguay)	2002	2002	
Khalifa Al Shamsi*	(United Arab Emirates)	2002	March 2003	
Arthur Bernardes	(Brazil)	March 2003	May 2004	
Vinko Begović	(Croatia)	2004	2005	
Zé Mário	(Brazil)	2006	2007	
Miroslav Beránek	(Czech Republic)	2007	2008	
Alexandre Guimarães	(Costa Rica)	July 2009	May 2010	
Khalifa Al Shamsi	(United Arab Emirates)	June 2010	June 2011	
Sérgio Farias	(Brazil)	August 2010	April 2011	
Diego Maradona	(Argentina)	May 2011	July 2012	
Bruno Metsu	(France)	July 2012	October 2012	
Guy Lacombe	(France)	November 2012	February 2013	
Eid Baroot	(United Arab Emirates)	February 2013	May 2013	
Laurent Banide	(France)	June 2013	October 2013	
Héctor Cúper	(Argentina)	November 2013	March 2014	
Jorginho*	(Brazil)	March 2014	October 2014	
Gabriel Calderón	(Argentina)	October 2014	May 2016	
Rodolfo Arruabarrena	(Argentina)	July 2016	June 2018	
Gustavo Quinteros	(Bolivia)	July 2018	October 2018	
Hassan Al Abdouli*	(United Arab Emirates)	October 2018	December 2018	
Laurențiu Reghecampf	(Romania)	December 2018	October 2020	
Salem Rabie*	(United Arab Emirates)	October 2020	December 2020	
Odair Hellmann	(Brazil)	December 2020	June 2022	
Juan Antonio Pizzi	(Spain)	July 2022	May 2023	
Miloš Milojević	(Serbia)	June 2023	May 2025	
Luís Castro	(Portugal)	June 2025	November 2025	
Mesut Meral	(Sweden)	November 2025	February 2026	
Rui Vitória	(Portugal)	February 2026	present	

== Pro-League record ==
Season	Lvl.	Tms.	Pos.	President's Cup	League Cup
2008–09	1	12	7th	Round of 16	First Round
2009–10	1	12	5th	Round of 16	First Round
2010–11	1	12	6th	Semi-Finals	Semi-Finals
2011–12	1	12	8th	Quarter-Finals	Semi-Finals
2012–13	1	14	9th	Round of 16	First Round
2013–14	1	14	12th	Quarter-Finals	First Round
2014–15	1	14	6th	Round of 16	First Round
2015–16	1	14	6th	Quarter-Finals	Semi-Finals
2016–17	1	14	2nd	Quarter-Finals	Semi-Finals
2017–18	1	12	3rd	Runner-ups	Runner-ups
2018–19	1	14	9th	Semi-Finals	Quarter-Finals
2019–20^{a}	1	14	8th	Quarter-Finals	Quarter-Finals
2020–21	1	14	9th	Quarter-Finals	Semi-Finals
2021–22	1	14	6th	Semi-Finals	Quarter-Finals
2022–23	1	14	4th	Semi-Finals	First Round
2023–24	1	14	1st	Champions	Semi-Finals
2024–25	1	14	4th	Semi-Finals	Semi-Finals

_{Notes 2019–20 UAE football season was cancelled due to the COVID-19 pandemic in the United Arab Emirates.}

Key

- Pos. = Position
- Tms. = Number of teams
- Lvl. = League

== See also ==
- List of football clubs in the United Arab Emirates
