= Al Shabab Al Arabi Club (Dubai) =

Football club based in Dubai, Al Mamzar, in the United Arab Emirates

Al Shabab
- Full name: Al Shabab Al Arabi Club
- Founded: 1958; 68 years ago (as Al Shabab Al Arabi Club Dubai)
- Dissolved: 2017; 9 years ago (merged with Dubai CSC)
- Ground: Maktoum bin Rashid Al Maktoum Stadium
- Capacity: 12,000
Home colours	Away colours

Al Shabab Al Arabi Club (Arabic: نادي الشباب العربي دبي), or simply Al Shabab, was an Emirati professional football and basketball club based in Dubai, that competed in the UAE Pro League. The club was founded in 1958.

In 2017, the club merged with Dubai CSC to join Al Ahli Dubai, which was rebranded as Shabab Al Ahli Club.

== Honours ==
- UAE Pro League

Winners: 1989–90, 1994–95, 2007–08

- UAE President's Cup:

Winners: 1980–81, 1989–90, 1993–94, 1996-97

- UAE League Cup

Winners: 2010–11

- GCC Champions League

Winners: 1992, 2011, 2015

- First Division League:

Winners: 1974–75

== Season-by-season record ==
Season	Lvl.	Tms.	Pos.	President's Cup	League Cup
2008–09	1	12	5th	Runner-ups	First Round
2009–10	1	12	7th	Runner-ups	First Round
2010–11	1	12	4th	Semi-Finals	Champions
2011–12	1	12	3rd	Round of 16	Runner-ups
2012–13	1	14	5th	Runner-ups	First Round
2013–14	1	14	4th	Quarter-Finals	First Round
2014–15	1	14	3rd	Semi-Finals	Semi-Finals
2015–16	1	14	5th	Round of 16	Runner-ups
2016–17	1	14	8th	Round of 16	Runner-ups

== Al Shabab in Asia ==
- AFC Champions League/Asian Club Championship

1991: Semi-finals
1995: First round
2012: Group Stage
2013: Round of 16
2016: Play off Round

=== Asian Club Championship history ===
Season	Round	Club	Home	Away	Aggregate
1991	First round	(Lebanon) Al-Ansar	3–1	1–1	4–2
1991	Group A	(Bangladesh) Mohammedan SC	2–1		2nd
1991	Group A	(Qatar) Al-Rayyan	1–2		2nd
1991	Group A	(Thailand) Port FC	3–1		2nd
1991	Semi-finals	(Saudi Arabia) Al-Hilal	0–1		
1991	Third place	(Qatar) Al-Rayyan	2–2 (6–7) (p)		
1995	First round	(Lebanon) Al-Ansar	2–1	0–1	2–2 (a)

=== AFC Champions League history ===
Season	Round	Club	Home	Away	Aggregate
2012	Play off Round	(Uzbekistan) Neftchi Fergana	3–0		
2012	Group D	(Iran) Persepolis	1–3	1–6	4th
2012	Group D	(Saudi Arabia) Al-Hilal	1–1	1–2	4th
2012	Group D	(Qatar) Al-Gharafa	0–0	1–2	4th
2013	Play-off round	(Iran) Saba Qom	1–1 (5–3) (p)		
2013	Group B	(Qatar) Lekhwiya	3–1	1–2	2nd
2013	Group B	(Uzbekistan) Pakhtakor	0–1	2–1	2nd
2013	Group B	(Saudi Arabia) Al-Ettifaq	1–0	1–4	2nd
2013	Round of 16	(Iran) Esteghlal	2–4	0–0	2–4
2016	Play off Round	(Uzbekistan) Bunyodkor	0–2		

=== Record by country ===
Country	Pld	W	D	L	GF	GA	GD	Win%
Bangladesh	1	1	0	0	2	1	+1	100.00
Iran	5	0	2	3	5	14	−9	0.00
Lebanon	4	2	1	1	6	4	+2	50.00
Qatar	6	1	2	3	8	8	+0	16.67
Saudi Arabia	5	1	1	3	4	7	−3	20.00
Thailand	1	1	0	0	3	1	+2	100.00
Uzbekistan	4	2	0	2	4	5	−1	50.00

== Managerial history ==
Name	Nat.	From	To	Ref.
Rabah Saâdane	(Algeria)		2002	
Grigore Sichitiu	(Romania)	2002	November 2002	
Hassan Ali	(United Arab Emirates)	November 2002	2002	
Reiner Hollmann	(Germany)	December 2002	2004	
Džemal Hadžiabdić	(Bosnia and Herzegovina)	June 2004	November 2005	
Renê Weber	(Brazil)	November 2005	2006	
Ilie Balaci	(Romania)	June 2006	November 2006	
Abdullah Saqr	(United Arab Emirates)	November 2006	June 2007	
Toninho Cerezo	(Brazil)	June 2007	October 2009	
Abdulwahad Abdulqadir	(Iraq)	October 2009	December 2009	
Paulo Bonamigo	(Brazil)	December 2009	May 2012	
Marcos Paquetá	(Brazil)	June 2012	May 2014	
Caio Júnior	(Brazil)	June 2014	May 2016	
Fred Rutten	(Netherlands)	May 2016	January 2017	
Miroslav Đukić	(Serbia)	January 2017	May 2017	

== See also ==
- List of football clubs in the United Arab Emirates
