= 2010–11 Al Wasl FC season =

Al Wasl FC
2010–11 season
- Manager: (United Arab Emirates) Khalifa Mubarak (Interim Manager)
- Stadium: Zabeel Stadium
- Premier League: 6th
- Presidents Cup: Semi-final
- Etisalat Cup: Semi-final
- Top goalscorer: League: Fran Yeste (10); All: Fran Yeste (16)
- Highest home attendance: 28,164
Home colours	Away colours

== Squad ==
Note: Flags indicate national team as defined under FIFA eligibility rules; some limited exceptions apply. Players may hold more than one non-FIFA nationality.

No.	Pos.	Nation	Player
1	GK	UAE	Rashid AlSuwaidi
3	DF	UAE	Omran Abdul Rahman
6	DF	UAE	Waheed Ismail
7	FW	UAE	Mohammad Omar
8	DF	UAE	Ali Mahmoud
9	DF	UAE	Tariq Hassan
10	MF	UAE	Khalid Darwish (Captain)
11	MF	ESP	Francisco Yeste
12	GK	UAE	Ali Hassan Al Amir
13	DF	UAE	Darweesh Ahmad
14	DF	UAE	Khalaf Ismail
16	MF	UAE	Obaid Nasser
17	FW	BRA	Alexandre Oliveira
20	MF	UAE	Fadel Ahmad
21	FW	UAE	Saeed Al Kass

No.	Pos.	Nation	Player
23	MF	UAE	Mohammed Jamal
24	FW	UAE	Rashid Eissa
25	DF	OMA	Mohammed Al Balushi
26	MF	UAE	Humaid Bin Lahej
27	FW	UAE	Hassan Yousif
28	MF	UAE	Faisal Ahmed
29	DF	UAE	Yasser Salem
32	FW	UAE	Ammar Mubarak
33	MF	UAE	Saud Suhail
46	MF	UAE	Abdulrahman Yousif
55	GK	UAE	Majed Nasser
70	FW	UAE	Mahir Jasem
77	MF	UAE	Eissa Ali (Vice-captain)
92	DF	UAE	Khalifa Abdullah
99	FW	BRA	Alex Pires de Souza

== Staff ==
- (United Arab Emirates) Khalifa Mobarak – Interim Coach
- Rodríguez – Assistant Coach
- (United Arab Emirates) Humaid Yousuf – Team Manager
- (Brazil) Luiz Carlos – Fitness Coach
- (Algeria) Yassin Bentaalla – Goalkeepers Coach
- (Iraq) Dr. Taha Al Rawy – Team Doctor
- (Brazil) Leandro Yoshinada Suzuki – Physiotherapist
- Rarim – Masseur

== Transfers ==
=== In ===
Name	Nat	Moving from	Fee
Obaid Nasser	(United Arab Emirates)	(United Arab Emirates) Fujairah Club	AED5m
Ali Hassan Al Amir	(United Arab Emirates)	(United Arab Emirates) Al Wahda Club	Undisclosed
Francisco Yeste	(Spain)	(Spain) Athletic Bilbao	Undisclosed
Coach Sérgio Farias	(Brazil)	(Saudi Arabia) Al-Ahli Jeddah	Undisclosed
Mohammad Omar	(United Arab Emirates)	Free agent	Undisclosed
Abdul-Rahman Khalfan	(United Arab Emirates)	(United Arab Emirates) Emirates Club	Undisclosed
Alex Pires De Souza	(Brazil)	(Brazil) Fluminense FC	Undisclosed
Khalifa Mobarak	(United Arab Emirates)	(United Arab Emirates) Al Wasl SC	Interim Manager

=== Out ===
Name	Nat	Moving To	Fee
Coach Alexandre Guimarães	(Costa Rica)		End of Contract
Élton	(Brazil)	Dubai Club	End of Loan
Soufiane Alloudi	(Morocco)	Al Ain Club	End of Loan
Nabil Ibrahim	(United Arab Emirates)	Al-Shaab (UAE)	End of Loan
Isam Darweesh	(United Arab Emirates)	Sharjah FC	End of Contract
Yousif Hassan	(United Arab Emirates)	Ajman Club	Loan
Salah Hussein	(United Arab Emirates)	UAE Armed Forces Club	Released
Yousuf Abdul Aziz	(United Arab Emirates)		Released
Sami Rubaiya	(United Arab Emirates)	Al-Jazira Club	Undisclosed
Abdul-Rahman Khalfan	(United Arab Emirates)	Hatta Club	Released
Sérgio Farias	(Brazil)		Sacked

For Last Season's Transfers List Please visit 2009–10 Al Wasl F.C. season

== Tournaments ==
=== Pre-Season Matches & Friendlies ===
==== Germany Camp ====
Based on the success of the previous season's camp, Al Wasl FC picked Nuremberg, Germany again to hold its annual summer camp. The team flew to Germany on 15 July 2010 and played four friendly matches during the camp.

==== The Dubai International Football Championship ====
Upon the return of the team from Germany, Al Wasl participated and hosted the Dubai International Football Championship which is a friendly mini-tournament held by the Dubai Sports Council in Zabeel Stadium. The other participants were Al-Ahli Dubai, Al-Wihdat Amman from Jordan, and Al-Merreikh from Sudan. Zamalek SC of Egypt was supposed to participate but it apologized at the last minute. The draw of the tournament was done on 12 August and Al Wasl played against Al-Merreikh on 16 August. The second match was against Al-Wihdat Amman on 19 August regardless the results of the first round as per the agreement of Al Wasl's coach Sérgio Farias and Al-Ahli's coach David O'Leary, their teams did not play against each other in the tournament due to having to play each other in the second round of the UAE Football League. Al Wasl was crowned as the tournament's Champion after winning both its matches. Its player Mohammed Jamal was picked as the tournament's Most Valuable Player and the Goalkeeper Majed Nasser as the best goalkeeper with zero goals conceded.

==== Results ====
Kickoff times are in UAE Time (UTC+4).

Win Draw Loss

21 July 2010 Friendly	(Germany) SpVgg Ansbach	0 – 0	Al Wasl	Sportpark Ansbach, Ansbach, Germany
20:00		(Report)

25 July 2010 Friendly	Al Wasl	2 – 6	(Turkey) Antalyaspor	FC Moosinning, Moosinning, Germany
20:00	Mahir Jasem 47', Khalid Darwish 52'	(Report)	Ali Zitouni 04', Necati Ateş 40', Ali Zitouni 53', Necati Ateş 62', Serge Djiehoua 66', Serge Djiehoua 80'

29 July 2010 Friendly	Al Wasl	1 – 3	(Romania) CS Concordia Chiajna	FC Moosinning, Moosinning, Germany
20:00	Mahir Jasem	(Report)	Adrian Popa, Marius Oae, Adrian Popa

3 August 2010 Friendly	(Germany) 1. FC Nuremberg II	3 – 1	Al Wasl	Frankenstadion, Nuremberg, Germany
20:00		(Report)	Alexander Oliveira

10 August 2010 Friendly	Al Wasl	0 – 1	(United Arab Emirates) Al-Sharjah Sports Club	Zabeel Stadium, Dubai
18:45			Marcelinho	Referee: Hamad Ali Yousif

16 August 2010 Dubai International Tournament – Round 1	Al Wasl	1 – 0	(Sudan) Al-Merreikh	Zabeel Stadium, Dubai
21:30	Mohammad Al Shaiba 04'			Referee: (United Arab Emirates) Fahad AlKassar

19 August 2010 Dubai International Tournament – Round 2	Al Wasl	1 – 0	(Jordan) Al-Wihdat	Zabeel Stadium, Dubai
21:30	Rashid Eissa 75'			Referee: (United Arab Emirates) Ibrahim AlMuhairi

6 September 2010 Friendly	Al Wasl	3 – 2	(Oman) Al-Nahda Club	Zabeel Stadium, Dubai
22:00	Fadel Ahmad, Ammar Mubarak, Francisco Yeste		Rodrigo, Abdulrahman Al Saadi	Referee: (United Arab Emirates) Yaseen Al Mansouri

4 January 2011 UAE – German Super Cup	Al Wasl	2 – 3	(Germany) Hamburger SV	Zabeel Stadium, Dubai
20:30	Mohammad Omar 29' (pen.), Mahir Jasem 68'		Paolo Guerrero 07', Ruud van Nistelrooy 25' (pen.), Änis Ben-Hatira 90+3'	Referee: (United Arab Emirates) Ibrahim AlMuhairi

10 May 2011 Friendly	Al Wasl	4 – 2	(United Arab Emirates) Ajman Club	Zabeel Stadium, Dubai
18:00	Francisco Yeste 22', Francisco Yeste 37', Tariq Hassan 42', Alexandre Oliveira 55'		Mohamed Kader 15', Mohamed Kader 45'	Referee: (United Arab Emirates) Ibrahim AlMuhairi

==== Top Scorers ====
Player	Goals
(United Arab Emirates) Mahir Jasem	3
(Spain) Francisco Yeste	3
(Brazil) Alexander Oliveira	2
(United Arab Emirates) Khalid Darwish	1
(Oman) Mohammad Al Shaiba	1
(United Arab Emirates) Rashid Eissa	1
(United Arab Emirates) Fadel Ahmad	1
(United Arab Emirates) Ammar Mubarak	1
(United Arab Emirates) Mohammad Omar	1
(United Arab Emirates) Tariq Hassan	1

=== UAE Premier League 2010–11 ===
Finishing fifth last season, Al Wasl entered the new season with a new coach and new signings.

==== Standing ====
Team	Rnk	Pld	W	D	L	GF	GA	GD	Pts
(United Arab Emirates) Al Wasl FC	6	22	9	4	9	31	36	-5	31

==== Results ====
Kickoff times are in UAE Time (UTC+4).

Win Draw Loss

26 August 2010 Round 1	Al Wasl	2 – 0	Al Wahda	Zabeel Stadium, Dubai
22:00	Mohammed Jamal 59', Francisco Yeste 65'			Attendance: 8000; Referee: (United Arab Emirates) Farid Ali

1 September 2010 Round 2	Ahli Dubai	4 – 1	Al Wasl	Rashed Stadium, Dubai
22:00	Ahmad Khamis 02', Ahmad Khalil 23', Pinga 44', Ahmad Khamis 90+'		Khalid Darwish 58'	Attendance: 7500; Referee: (United Arab Emirates) Ammar AlJonaibi

17 September 2010 Round 3	Al Wasl	2 – 1	Bani Yas	Zabeel Stadium, Dubai
20:00	Mahir Jasem 04', Francisco Yeste 61'		André Senghor 67'	Attendance: 6535; Referee: (United Arab Emirates) Mohammad Abdullah Hassan

25 September 2010 Round 4	Al Dhafra	2 – 3	Al Wasl	Al Dhafra Stadium, Madinat Zayed
17:30	Boris Landry Kabi 11', Hamad AbduAlrahman 69'		Khiri Khilfan 06' (o.g.), Francisco Yeste 37', Saeed Al Kass 89'	Attendance: 1561; Referee: (United Arab Emirates) Ammar AlJonaibi

2 October 2010 Round 5	Al Shabab	0 – 4	Al Wasl	Maktoum bin Rashid Stadium, Dubai
20:00			Alexandre Oliveira 14', Francisco Yeste 27', Saeed Al Kass 90+1', Alexandre Oliveira 90+3'	Referee: (United Arab Emirates) Fahad AlKassar

17 October 2010 Round 6	Al Wasl	2 – 1	Al-Ittihad Kalba	Zabeel Stadium, Dubai
17:10	Francisco Yeste 02' (pen.), Alexandre Oliveira 33'		Grégory Dufrennes 42'	Referee: (United Arab Emirates) Mohammad Abdullah Hassan

22 October 2010 Round 7	Al-Jazira Club	3 – 1	Al Wasl	Mohammad bin Zayed Stadium, Abu Dhabi
20:00	Ibrahim Diaky 42', Ibrahim Diaky 67', Ahmed Jumaa 86'		Rashid Eissa 71'	Attendance: 28164; Referee: (United Arab Emirates) Fahad AlKassar

27 October 2010 Round 8	Al Wasl	2 – 2	Al Ain Club	Zabeel Stadium, Dubai
20:00	Francisco Yeste 17', Francisco Yeste 80' (pen.)		Juma Saeed 54', Mohanad Salem 65'	Attendance: 8695; Referee: (United Arab Emirates) Mohammad Abdullah Hassan

12 December 2010 Round 9	Dubai Club	2 – 1	Al Wasl	Al Aweer Stadium, Al Aweer
18:15	Abubakar Kamara 47', Hassan AbdulRahman 63'		Darweesh Ahmad 04'	Referee: (United Arab Emirates) AbdulWahid Khater

19 December 2010 Round 10	Al Wasl	2 – 3	Al Nasr	Zabeel Stadium, Dubai
20:30	Mohammed Al Balushi 39', Francisco Yeste 89'		Abdallah Ahmed 29', Habib Fardan 34', Carlos Tenorio 77' (pen.)	Referee: (United Arab Emirates) Farid Ali

23 December 2010 Round 11	Sharjah	1 – 1	Al Wasl	Sharjah Stadium, Sharjah
20:30	Humaid Ahmed 16'		Tariq Hassan 23'	Referee: (United Arab Emirates) Ibrahim AlMuhairi

4 February 2011 Round 12	Al Wahda	4 – 0	Al Wasl	Al-Nahyan Stadium, Abu Dhabi
20:15	Bashir Saeed 13', Fernando Baiano 84' (pen.), Mohamed Al Shehhi 88', Ismail Matar 92'			Referee: (United Arab Emirates) Hamad AlShaikh

19 February 2011 Round 13	Al Wasl	2 – 0	Ahli Dubai	Zabeel Stadium, Dubai
20:15	Saeed Al Kass 69', Omran Abdul Rahman 90+5'			Referee: (United Arab Emirates) Ali Hamad

26 March 2011 Round 14	Bani Yas	0 – 0	Al Wasl	Baniyas Stadium, Al Shamkha
20:30				Referee: (United Arab Emirates) Hamad AlShaikh

1 April 2011 Round 15	Al Wasl	2 – 1	Al Dhafra	Zabeel Stadium, Dubai
17:50	Francisco Yeste 7', Eissa Ali 61' (pen.)		Abass Muyiwa Lawal 5'	Referee: (United Arab Emirates) Farid Ali

16 April 2011 Round 16	Al Wasl	1 – 3	Al Shabab	Zabeel Stadium, Dubai
20:45	Francisco Yeste 80' (pen.)		Júlio César 53', Carlos Villanueva 61', Carlos Villanueva 66'	Referee: (United Arab Emirates) Ammar AlJonaibi

24 April 2011 Round 17	Al-Ittihad Kalba	2 – 3	Al Wasl	Kalba Stadium, Kalba
17:55	Saud Faraj 49', Ibrahim Murad 72' (pen.)		Rashid Eissa 30', Alexandre Oliveira 60', Khalifa Abdullah 88'	Referee: (United Arab Emirates) Ibrahim AlMuhairi

16 May 2011 Round 18	Al Wasl	0 – 4	Al-Jazira Club	Zabeel Stadium, Dubai
21:00			Ricardo Oliveira 41', Jumaa Abdullah 51', Ricardo Oliveira 60', Jumaa Abdullah 90+5'	Referee: (United Arab Emirates) Hamad AlShaikh

20 May 2011 Round 19	Al Ain Club	0 – 0	Al Wasl	Tahnoun bin Mohammed Stadium, Al Ain
21:00				Referee: (United Arab Emirates) Ammar AlJonaibi

29 May 2011 Round 20	Al Wasl	1 – 0	Dubai Club	Zabeel Stadium, Dubai
19:50	Darweesh Ahmad 38'			Referee: (United Arab Emirates) Fahad AlKassar

1 June 2011 Round 21	Al Nasr	1 – 0	Al Wasl	Al-Maktoum Stadium, Dubai
19:50	Ali Abbas Yasin 80'			Referee: (United Arab Emirates) Abdulla Al Ajel

5 June 2011 Round 22	Al Wasl	1 – 2	Sharjah	Zabeel Stadium, Dubai
19:55	Darweesh Ahmad 42'		Nawaf Mubarak 15', Marcelinho 63'	Referee: (United Arab Emirates) Essa Al Hajeri

==== Results by round ====
Round	1	2	3	4	5	6	7	8	9	10	11	12	13	14	15	16	17	18	19	20	21	22
Ground	H	A	H	A	A	H	A	H	A	H	A	A	H	A	H	H	A	H	A	H	A	H
Result	W	L	W	W	W	W	L	D	L	L	D	L	W	D	W	L	W	L	D	W	L	L
Position	3	9	5	1	1	1	2	3	3	3	4	7	4	5	4	4	4	4	4	3	4	6

Updated to match(es) played on 2 October 2010. Source: League Matches
A = Away; H = Home; W = Win; D = Draw; L = Loss

==== Top Scorers ====
Player	Goals
(Spain) Francisco Yeste	10
(Brazil) Alexander Oliveira	4
(United Arab Emirates) Saeed Al Kass	3
(United Arab Emirates) Darweesh Ahmad	3
(United Arab Emirates) Rashid Eissa	2
(United Arab Emirates) Mohammed Jamal	1
(United Arab Emirates) Khalid Darwish	1
(United Arab Emirates) Mahir Jasem	1
(Oman) Mohammed Al Shaiba	1
(United Arab Emirates) Tariq Hassan	1
(United Arab Emirates) Omran Abdul Rahman	1
(United Arab Emirates) Eissa Ali	1
(United Arab Emirates) Khalifa Abdullah	1

An own goal has also been scored for AlWasl by Al Dhafra Club's player Khiri Khilfan in the 4th Round

=== UAE President's Cup 2010–11 ===
After a disappointing elimination from the Round of 16 in the previous season, Al Wasl is planning to put in a better display this season. Everything went as planned until the Semi-final against Al Wahda where Al Wasl FC conceded 2 goals in the first half, then failed to score more than one in the second half despite dominating the entire half. This was Al-Wasl's last chance to win an official tournament in the 2010–11 Season.

==== Results ====
Kickoff times are in UAE Time (UTC+4).

Win Draw Loss

20 September 2010 Round of 32	Al Wasl FC	8 – 0	Al Taawon Club	Al-Arabi (UAE) Stadium, Umm al-Quwain
17:25	Rashid Eissa 02', Alexander Oliveira 16', Khalid Darwish 23' (pen.), Mohammad Jamal 43', Rashid Eissa 60', Abdul Rahman Khalfan 72', Darweesh Ahmad 86' (pen.), Abdul Rahman Khalfan 89'			Referee: (United Arab Emirates) Ali Hassan

9 February 2011 Round of 16	Al Wasl FC	1 – 0	UAE Armed Forces Club	Sheikh Khalifa International Stadium, Al Ain
20:00	Rashid Eissa 85'			Referee: (United Arab Emirates) Yaseen Al Mansouri

24 February 2011 Quarter-finals	Al Wasl FC	1 – 0	Al-Ahli Dubai	Maktoum bin Rashid Stadium, Dubai
20:30	Fran Yeste 60'			Referee: (United Arab Emirates) Farid Ali

20 March 2011 Semi-finals	Al Wasl FC	1 – 2	Al Wahda S.C.C.	Sheikh Zayed Stadium, Abu Dhabi
17:45	Rashid Eissa 69'		Hugo 17', Magrão 24'	Referee: (United Arab Emirates) Ali Hamad

==== Top Scorers ====
Player	Goals
(United Arab Emirates) Rashid Eissa	4
(United Arab Emirates) Abdul Rahman Khalfan	2
(Brazil) Alexander Oliveira	1
(United Arab Emirates) Khalid Darwish	1
(United Arab Emirates) Mohammed Jamal	1
(United Arab Emirates) Darweesh Ahmad	1
(Spain) Francisco Yeste	1

=== Etisalat Cup 2010–11 ===
The Etisalat Cup is a gap-filler between the official tournaments. It does not involve the International Players. Al Wasl's performance was promising in the tournament, but it was eliminated in the semi-finals after losing to Al Ain 2–3 in a match that witnessed the Fastest Equalizer in the History of Football scored by Fran Yeste.

==== Standing ====
Team	Rnk	Pld	W	D	L	GF	GA	GD	Pts
(United Arab Emirates) Al Wasl FC	2	10	4	4	2	11	9	+2	16

==== Results ====
10 October 2010 Round 1	Sharjah	0 – 0	Al Wasl	Sharjah Stadium, Sharjah
17:15				Referee: (United Arab Emirates) Yaqoub AlHammadi

4 November 2010 Round 2	Al Wasl	2 – 2	Al-Jazira Club	Zabeel Stadium, Dubai
20:00	Eissa Ali 01', Eissa Ali 74'		Ali Mabkhout 12', Ahmed Jumaa 72'	Referee: (United Arab Emirates) Ali AlMulla

12 November 2010 Round 3	Al Shabab	0 – 1	Al Wasl	Maktoum bin Rashid Stadium, Dubai
20:00			Alexandre Oliveira 41'	Referee: (United Arab Emirates) Ali Hamad

20 November 2010 Round 4	Al Wasl	0 – 0	Al-Ittihad Kalba	Zabeel Stadium, Dubai
16:50				Referee: (United Arab Emirates) Hamad Ali Yousif

25 November 2010 Round 5	Al Wasl	2 – 0	Ahli Dubai	Zabeel Stadium, Dubai
20:00	Eissa Ali 49', Omran Abdul Rahman 56'			Referee: (United Arab Emirates) Hamad AlShaikh

3 December 2010 Round 6	Ahli Dubai	2 – 3	Al Wasl	Rashed Stadium, Dubai
20:00	Pinga 41' (pen.), Aristide Bancé 76'		Khalid Darwish 31', Darweesh Ahmad 60', Omran Abdul Rahman 71'	Referee: (United Arab Emirates) Ali AlMulla

31 December 2010 Round 7	Al-Ittihad Kalba	2 – 0	Al Wasl	Kalba Stadium, Kalba
16:50	Ibrahim Abdullah 61', Gregory Dufrennes 85'			Referee: (United Arab Emirates) Sultan AlMarzouqi

8 January 2011 Round 8	Al Wasl	2 – 1	Al Shabab	Zabeel Stadium, Dubai
18:30	Alexandre Oliveira 30', Mohammad Jamal 54'		Issa Mohammed 60'	Referee: (United Arab Emirates) Hamad Ali Yousif

15 January 2011 Round 9	Al-Jazira Club	1 – 1	Al Wasl	Mohammad bin Zayed Stadium, Abu Dhabi
17:10	Yasser Salem 06' (o.g.)		Francisco Yeste 85' (pen.)	Referee: (United Arab Emirates) Mohammad Abdullah Hassan

22 January 2011 Round 10	Al Wasl	0 – 1	Sharjah	Zabeel Stadium, Dubai
18:40			Marcelo 30'	Attendance: 52; Referee: (United Arab Emirates) Ammar AlJonaibi

10 March 2011 Semifinal	Al Wasl	2 – 3	Al Ain	Al Nahyan Stadium, Abu Dhabi
20:30	Eissa Ali 23' (pen.), Francisco Yeste 51'		Ismail Ahmed 50', Ibrahima Keita 67', Elias Ribeiro 89' (pen.)	Referee: (United Arab Emirates) Ibrahim AlMuhairi

==== Top Scorers ====
Player	Goals
(United Arab Emirates) Eissa Ali	4
(United Arab Emirates) Omran Abdul Rahman	2
(Brazil) Alexandre Oliveira	2
(Spain) Francisco Yeste	2
(United Arab Emirates) Khalid Darwish	1
(United Arab Emirates) Darweesh Ahmad	1
(United Arab Emirates) Mohammad Jamal	1

== Season Top scorers ==
Position	Nation	Number	Name	Friendlies	League	President's Cup	Etisalat Cup	Total
1	(Spain)	11	Francisco Yeste	3	10	1	2	16
2	(Brazil)	17	Alexandre Oliveira	2	4	1	2	9
3	(United Arab Emirates)	24	Rashid Eissa	1	2	4	0	7
4	(United Arab Emirates)	13	Darweesh Ahmad	0	3	1	1	5
4	(United Arab Emirates)	77	Eissa Ali	0	1	0	4	5
6	(United Arab Emirates)	70	Mahir Jasem	3	1	0	0	4
7	(United Arab Emirates)	21	Saeed Al Kass	0	3	0	0	3
7	(United Arab Emirates)	23	Mohammed Jamal	0	1	1	1	3
7	(United Arab Emirates)	10	Khalid Darwish	0	1	1	1	3
7	(United Arab Emirates)	3	Omran Abdul Rahman	0	1	0	2	3
11	(Oman)	25	Mohammed Al Balushi	1	1	0	0	2
11	(United Arab Emirates)	99	Abdul Rahman Khalfan	0	0	2	0	2
13	(United Arab Emirates)	9	Tariq Hassan	1	1	0	0	2
13	(United Arab Emirates)	92	Khalifa Abdullah	0	1	0	0	1
13	(United Arab Emirates)	20	Fadel Ahmad	1	0	0	0	1
13	(United Arab Emirates)	32	Ammar Mubarak	1	0	0	0	1
13	(United Arab Emirates)	7	Mohammad Omar	1	0	0	0	1
			TOTALS	15	30	11	13	59

Last updated on 29 May 2011

== Season Highlights ==
- Al Wasl's League away match against Al Jazira on 22 October 2010, attracted 28,164 fans in Al Jazira Mohammed bin Zayed Stadium, making it the highest attended match in the season.
- Al Wasl was the second longest team to top the league table this season, staying there for 3 consecutive rounds (4–6).
- Al Wasl's Etisalat Cup Semi-final match against Al Ain Club witnessed the Fastest Equalizer in the History of Football scored by Fran Yeste.

== Other Seasons ==
- 2008–09 Al Wasl FC season
- 2009–10 Al Wasl FC season

== See also ==
- 2010–11 UAE Premier League
- Al Wasl FC
- Al Wasl SC
