= 2010–11 UAE Pro League =

UAE Pro League
- Season: 2010–11
- Champions: Al Jazira; 1st title
- Relegated: Al Dhafra; Ittihad Kalba
- Matches: 126
- Goals: 425 (3.37 per match)
- Top goalscorer: André Senghor (16)
- Biggest home win: Al Wahda 6–1 Sharjah (15 May 2011); Dubai 6–4 Al Dhafra (20 May 2011)
- Biggest away win: Sharjah 3–5 Baniyas (13 December 2010)
- Highest scoring: Dubai 6–4 Al Dhafra (20 May 2011)
- Highest attendance: 36,241; Al Jazira – Dubai
- Average attendance: 3,240

The 2010–11 UAE Pro League (known as Etisalat Pro League for sponsorship reasons) was the 36th edition of top-level football in the United Arab Emirates. This was the third Professional season in the history of the country. Al Wahda were defending champions from the 2009–10 campaign. Ajman and Emirates were relegated from the previous season. Dubai and Ittihad Kalba were promoted from the UAE First Division 1 Group A. The campaign began on 26 August 2010 and ended on 9 June 2011.

After being runner-up for three consecutive seasons, Al Jazira secured their 1st Pro League title after beating Al Wasl 4–0 on 16 May 2011, becoming the third club to achieve the double in country's history after Al Nasr in 1986 and Al Wasl in 2007.

== Teams ==
Ajman and Emirates were relegated to the second-level league after finishing in the bottom two in the 2009–10 season. The two relegated teams were replaced by second level champions Ittihad Kalba and runners up Dubai.

=== Stadia and locations ===
Locations of teams in the 2010–11 UAE Pro League

Team	Home city	Stadium	Capacity
Al Ahli	Dubai	Rashed Stadium	18,000
Al Ain	Al Ain	Tahnoun bin Mohammed Stadium	15,000
Al Dhafra	Madinat Zayed	Hamdan bin Zayed Al Nahyan Stadium	12,000
Al Jazira	Abu Dhabi	Al Jazira Mohammed Bin Zayed Stadium	42,056
Al Nasr	Dubai	Al-Maktoum Stadium	12,000
Al Shabab	Dubai	Maktoum Bin Rashid Al Maktoum Stadium	12,000
Al Wahda	Abu Dhabi	Al-Nahyan Stadium	12,000
Al Wasl	Dubai	Zabeel Stadium	12,000
Baniyas	Abu Dhabi	Bani Yas Stadium	6,000
Dubai	Dubai	Police Officers Club Stadium	6,500
Ittihad Kalba	Kalba	Ittihad Kalba Club Stadium	3,000
Sharjah	Sharjah	Sharjah Stadium	18,000

=== Personnel and sponsorship ===
Note: Flags indicate national team as has been defined under FIFA eligibility rules. Players and Managers may hold more than one non-FIFA nationality.

Team	Chairman	Head coach	Captain	Kitmaker	Shirt sponsor
Al Ahli	(United Arab Emirates) Abdullah Saeed Al Naboodah	(United Arab Emirates) Abdulhameed Al Mishtiki	(Italy) Fabio Cannavaro	Adidas	Toshiba
Al Ain	(United Arab Emirates) Hazza bin Zayed Al Nahyan	(Brazil) Alexandre Gallo	(United Arab Emirates) Ali Al-Wehaibi	Macron	First Gulf Bank
Al Dhafra	(United Arab Emirates) Saif bin Mohammed bin Butti Al Hamed	(Syria) Mohammad Kwid	(United Arab Emirates) Mohammed Salem Al Saedi	BURRDA	ADCO
Al Jazira	(United Arab Emirates) Mansour bin Zayed Al Nahyan	(Brazil) Abel Braga	(Ivory Coast) Ibrahim Diaky	Adidas	IPIC
Al Nasr	(United Arab Emirates) Maktoum bin Hasher bin Maktoum Al Maktoum	(Italy) Walter Zenga	(United Arab Emirates) Abdallah Mousa	Erreà	Emirates NBD
Al Shabab	(United Arab Emirates) Saeed bin Maktoum bin Rashid Al Maktoum	(Brazil) Paulo Bonamigo	(United Arab Emirates) Adeel Abdullah	Erreà	emaratech
Al Wahda	(United Arab Emirates) Saeed bin Zayed Al Nahyan	(Austria) Josef Hickersberger	(United Arab Emirates) Basheer Saeed	Nike	EMAL
Al Wasl	(United Arab Emirates) Ahmed bin Rashid Al Maktoum	(United Arab Emirates) Khalifa Mubarak	(United Arab Emirates) Khalid Darwish	Nike	Saif Belhasa Group of Companies
Baniyas	(United Arab Emirates) Saif bin Zayed Al Nahyan	(United Arab Emirates) Mahdi Ali	(Oman) Fawzi Bashir	Erreà	Secure Project Management
Dubai	(United Arab Emirates) Ahmed bin Rashid Al Maktoum	(Brazil) Junior dos Santos	(United Arab Emirates) Ali Hassan	Umbro	N/A
Ittihad Kalba	(United Arab Emirates) Saeed bin Saqr Al Qasimi	(Brazil) Jorvan Vieira	(France) Grégory Dufrennes	Adidas	Gillett Group
Sharjah	(Qatar) Abdullah bin Mohammed Al Thani	(United Arab Emirates) Abdul Majid	(United Arab Emirates) Abdullah Suhail	N/A	Saif-Zone

=== Managerial changes ===
==== Pre-season ====
Team	Outgoing manager	Manner of departure	Replaced by
Al Ain	(United Arab Emirates) Abdulhameed Al Mishtiki (caretaker)	Appointed on permanent role	(United Arab Emirates) Abdulhameed Al Mishtiki
Al Wasl	(Costa Rica) Alexandre Guimarães	Contract not renewed	(Brazil) Sérgio Farias
Al Ahli	(Netherlands) Henk ten Cate	Resigned	(Republic of Ireland) David O'Leary
Al Wahda	(Austria) Josef Hickersberger	Contract not renewed	(Romania) László Bölöni

==== During the season ====
Team	Outgoing manager	Manner of departure	Replaced by
Al Wahda	(Romania) László Bölöni	Sacked	(Brazil) Tite
Al Wahda	(Brazil) Tite	Resigned	(Austria) Josef Hickersberger
Al Dhafra	(Switzerland) Michel Decastel	Sacked	(Costa Rica) Alexandre Guimarães
Al Nasr	(Brazil) Hélio dos Anjos	Sacked	(United Arab Emirates) Eid Baroot (caretaker)
Dubai	(Egypt) Ayman El Ramady	Sacked	(Brazil) Junior dos Santos
Al Ain	(United Arab Emirates) Abdulhameed Al Mishtiki	Sacked	(Brazil) Alexandre Gallo
Al Nasr	(United Arab Emirates) Eid Baroot	Full-time coach appointed	(Italy) Walter Zenga
Al Ahli	(Republic of Ireland) David O'Leary	Sacked	(United Arab Emirates) Abdulhameed Al Mishtiki
Al Wasl	(Brazil) Sérgio Farias	Sacked	(United Arab Emirates) Khalifa Mubarak
Baniyas	(Tunisia) Lotfi Benzarti	Sacked	(United Arab Emirates) Mahdi Ali
Al Sharjah	(Portugal) Manuel Cajuda	Sacked	(United Arab Emirates) Abdul Majid

=== Foreign players ===
Club	Player 1	Player 2	Player 3	Player 4	Former player(s)
Al Ahli	(Brazil) Pinga	(Italy) Fabio Cannavaro	(Morocco) Karim El Ahmadi		(Burkina Faso) Aristide Bancé
Al Ain	(Brazil) Elias	(Ivory Coast) Brahima Keita	(Ivory Coast) Jumaa Saeed	(Romania) Valentin Badea	(Argentina) José Sand (Brazil) André Dias
Al Dhafra	(Brazil) Filipe Machado	(Guinea) Mohamed Sylla	(Ivory Coast) Boris Kabi	(Nigeria) Abass Lawal	(Algeria) Toufik Zerara (Morocco) Mohamed Berrabeh
Al Jazira	(Argentina) Matías Delgado	(Brazil) Baré	(Brazil) Ricardo Oliveira	(Ivory Coast) Ibrahim Diaky	(Ivory Coast) Antonin Koutouan
Al Nasr	(Brazil) Careca	(Brazil) Léo Lima	(Guinea) Ismaël Bangoura		(Ecuador) Carlos Tenorio
Al Shabab	(Brazil) Ciel	(Brazil) Júlio César	(Chile) Carlos Villanueva	(Senegal) Lamine Diarra	
Al Wahda	(Brazil) Fernando Baiano	(Brazil) Hugo	(Brazil) Magrão		(Ivory Coast) Modibo Kane Diarra
Al Wasl	(Brazil) Alexandre Oliveira	(Brazil) Alex Pires	(Oman) Mohammed Al-Balushi	(Spain) Francisco Yeste	
Baniyas	(Iraq) Mustafa Karim	(Netherlands) Rafael Uiterloo	(Oman) Fawzi Bashir	(Senegal) André Senghor	(Brazil) Éder Gaúcho
Dubai	(Belgium) Rachid Tiberkanine	(Brazil) Gil Bala	(France) Michaël N'dri	(Guinea) Aboubacar Camara	(Morocco) Mounir Diane (Morocco) Yazid Kaïssi
Ittihad Kalba	(Bahrain) Abdulla Baba Fatadi	(Brazil) Kanú	(France) Grégory Dufrennes	(Guinea) Simon Feindouno	(Brazil) Matheus Martins (Senegal) Khadim Diouf (Senegal) Moustapha Dabo
Sharjah	(Brazil) Gustavo	(Brazil) Marcelinho	(Brazil) Robinho		(Brazil) Marcelão

== League table ==
Pos	Team	Pld	W	D	L	GF	GA	GD	Pts	Qualification or relegation
1	Al Jazira (C)	22	16	5	1	64	27	+37	53	2012 AFC Champions League Group Stage
2	Baniyas	22	12	5	5	38	24	+14	41	2012 AFC Champions League Group Stage
3	Al Nasr	22	10	5	7	34	30	+4	35	2012 AFC Champions League Group Stage
4	Al Shabab	22	9	7	6	42	32	+10	34	2012 AFC Champions League Qualifying play-off (Note: Since Al-Jazira also won the 2010–11 UAE President's Cup, the fourth-placed team of the league also qualified for the 2012 AFC Champions League.)
5	Al Wahda	22	8	7	7	44	31	+13	31	2012 GCC Champions League
6	Al Wasl	22	9	4	9	31	36	−5	31	2012 GCC Champions League
7	Sharjah	22	8	6	8	30	34	−4	30	
8	Al Ahli	22	7	6	9	30	42	−12	27	
9	Dubai	22	8	2	12	33	48	−15	26	
10	Al Ain	22	6	7	9	33	35	−2	25	
11	Ittihad Kalba (R)	22	6	2	14	39	56	−17	20	Relegation to UAE Division 2 Group A
12	Al-Dhafra (R)	22	3	4	15	27	50	−23	13	Relegation to UAE Division 2 Group A

Source: UFL
Rules for classification: 1) points; 2) goal difference; 3) number of goals scored.
(C) Champions; (R) Relegated

== Results ==
Home \ Away	ALI	AIN	ITT	JAZ	NAS	SHA	WAH	WAS	YAS	DHA	DUB	SHR
Al Ahli		0–4	2–2	2–2	1–1	1–3	0–2	4–1	1–0	0–0	3–1	2–1
Al Ain	1–2		1–4	4–1	1–2	1–1	2–0	0–0	1–1	1–1	4–3	1–1
Ittihad Kalba	2–2	4–3		3–4	1–2	2–1	5–3	2–3	2–1	1–3	0–1	0–3
Al Jazira	5–1	4–0	5–2		3–0	3–3	0–0	3–1	4–0	5–3	4–2	3–0
Al Nasr	4–0	0–3	2–0	1–2		3–2	1–3	1–0	1–0	1–1	1–1	1–2
Al Shabab	2–2	3–0	4–1	0–2	2–2		1–1	0–4	0–1	4–0	2–0	1–1
Al Wahda	1–2	0–0	3–1	2–2	2–0	5–2		4–0	1–3	2–4	2–2	6–1
Al Wasl	2–0	2–2	2–1	0–4	2–3	1–3	2–0		2–1	2–1	1–0	1–2
Baniyas	2–1	3–0	4–2	1–1	1–0	2–2	2–1	0–0		2–0	2–0	1–1
Al Dhafra	2–0	0–3	1–2	0–1	1–4	0–1	1–1	2–3	0–2		3–5	0–1
Dubai	2–1	1–0	3–1	1–4	1–3	0–2	0–5	2–1	1–4	6–4		1–0
Sharjah	2–3	2–1	3–1	1–2	1–1	0–3	0–0	1–1	3–5	1–5	1–0	

Updated to match(es) played on 2 June 2011. Source: UFL
Legend: Blue = home team win; Yellow = draw; Red = away team win.

== Season statistics ==
=== Top goalscorers ===
Rank	Player	Club	Goal(s)
1	(Senegal) André Senghor	Baniyas	18
2	(Brazil) Marcelinho	Sharjah	12
2	(Ivory Coast) Ibrahim Diaky	Al Jazira	12
4	(Brazil) Baré	Al Jazira	11
4	(Brazil) Pinga	Al Wahda	11
4	(France) Grégory Dufrennes	Ittihad Kalba	11
4	(Ivory Coast) Boris Kabi	Al Dhafra	11
8	(Brazil) Júlio César	Al Shabab	10
8	(Guinea) Ismaël Bangoura	Al Nasr	10
8	(Spain) Francisco Yeste	Al Wasl	10
11	(Brazil) Fernando Baiano	Al Wahda	9
11	(Brazil) Ricardo Oliveira	Al Jazira	9
13	(France) Michaël N'dri	Dubai	8
13	(United Arab Emirates) Omar Abdulrahman	Al Ain	8

Source: Etisalat Pro-League – Top goalscorers
Last updated:2 June 2011

=== Scoring ===
- First goal of the season: (Nigeria) Abass Lawal for Al Dhafra against Al Ahli, 35 minutes and 19 seconds (27 August 2010).
- First penalty kick of the season: 56 minutes and 44 seconds – (Brazil) Marcelinho (scored) for Al Sharjah against Al Jazira (2 September 2010).
- Fastest goal in a match: 2 minutes – (Brazil) Hugo for Al Wahda against Al Shabab (27 October 2010).
- Goal scored at the latest point in a match: 94 minutes and 47 seconds – (United Arab Emirates) Jumaa Abdullah for Al Jazira against Al Wasl (16 May 2011).
- Widest winning margin: 6 Goals
  - Al Wahda 6–1 Al Sharjah (15 May 2011).
  - Dubai 6–4 Al Dhafra (20 May 2011).
- Most goals in a match by one team: 6 Goals
  - Al Wahda 6–1 Al Sharjah (15 May 2011).
  - Dubai 6–4 Al Dhafra (20 May 2011).
- Most goals scored by losing team: 4 goals
  - Dubai 6–4 Al Dhafra (20 May 2011).
- Most goals in a match by one player: 3 goals
  - (Senegal) André Senghor for Bani Yas against Ittihad Kalba (26 September 2010)
  - (Ivory Coast) Boris Kabi for Al Dhafra against Al Wahda (23 December 2010)
  - (United Arab Emirates) Ismail Matar for Al Wahda against Ittihad Kalba (19 February 2011)
- Hat-tricks of the season:
  - (Senegal) André Senghor for Bani Yas against Ittihad Kalba (26 September 2010)
  - (Ivory Coast) Boris Kabi for Al Dhafra against Al Wahda (23 December 2010)
  - (United Arab Emirates) Ismail Matar for Al Wahda against Ittihad Kalba (19 February 2011)

=== Discipline ===
- First yellow card of the season: (Italy) Fabio Cannavaro for Al Ahli against Al Dhafra, 9 minutes (27 August 2010).
- First red card of the season: (United Arab Emirates) Darwish Ahmed for Al Wasl against Al Ahli, 90 minutes (1 September 2010).
- Card given at latest point in a game:

(United Arab Emirates) Abdallah Ahmed (yellow) at 90+3 for Al Nasr against Al Dhafra (28 May 2011).

Rank	Team	Games	Yellow card	Direct Red Card
1	Al Nasr	21	56	1
	Al Jazira	21	57	2
3	Ittihad Kalba	21	58	1
4	Al Ahli	21	48	5
5	Al Shabab	21	45	3
6	Al Ain	21	44	2
7	Al Dhafra	21	39	3
	Al Wasl	21	39	6
9	Al Wahda	21	42	2
10	Al Sharjah	21	32	6
11	Bani Yas	21	32	1
12	Dubai	21	29	1
Totals			521	33

Source: Yellow Cards, Red Cards
Last updated: 2 June 2011

== Attendances ==
#	Football club	Home games	Average attendance
1	Al-Jazira	11	15,922
2	Al-Ain FC	11	4,950
3	Al-Wahda FC	11	3,608
4	Al-Wasl FC	11	3,240
5	Al-Ahli	11	2,513
6	Baniyas	11	2,317
7	Al-Nasr SC	11	1,703
8	Sharjah FC	11	1,501
9	Al-Shabab Al-Arabi	11	1,065
10	Dubai CSC	11	900
11	Al-Dhafra FC	11	802
12	Kalba FC	11	659

== See also ==
- 2010–11 UAE President's Cup
- 2010–11 Etisalat Emirates Cup
