= 2010–11 Al Jazira Club season =

Al Jazira Club
2010–11 season
- Chairman: Mansour bin Zayed Al Nahyan
- Head coach: Abel Braga
- Stadium: Mohammed bin Zayed Stadium
- UAE Pro League: 1st
- UAE President's Cup: Winners
- Etisalat Emirates Cup: Group stage
- AFC Champions League: Group stage
- Top goalscorer: League: Ibrahim Diaky (12); All: Baré (19)
- Highest home attendance: 28,000 vs Al Wasl (22 October 2010)
- Biggest win: Al Jazira 7–0 Ras Al Khaima
- Biggest defeat: Sepahan 5–1 Al-Jazira
Home colours	Away colours

The 2010–11 season was the 37th season in the existence of Al Jazira Club and the club's 13th consecutive season in the top flight of UAE football. This team won the league title for the first time in history after defeating Al-Wasl with four rounds to go.

== Players ==
=== First-team squad ===
Note: Flags indicate national team as defined under FIFA eligibility rules; some limited exceptions apply. Players may hold more than one non-FIFA nationality.

No.	Pos.	Nation	Player
10	LW	UAE	Adam Awad
5	DF	UAE	Abdulsalaam Jumaa
6	DF	UAE	Rashid Abdulrahman
7	FW	UAE	Ahmed Jumaa
8	MF	UAE	Abdulla Qasim
9	FW	BRA	Baré
10	MF	CIV	Ibrahim Diaky (Captain)
11	MF	UAE	Ahmed Muhad
12	MF	UAE	Naser Masoud
14	FW	CIV	Toni
15	DF	UAE	Saleh Basher
17	MF	UAE	Saleh Obaid
18	MF	UAE	Abdalha Musa

No.	Pos.	Nation	Player
19	DF	UAE	Ridha Abdul Hadi
20	MF	UAE	Mohsen Saad
21	DF	UAE	Khalid Ali Jaber
22	MF	ARG	Matías Delgado
23	MF	UAE	Khalid Sabeel
24	MF	UAE	Subait Khater
26	MF	UAE	Salim Masoud Rashid
33	GK	UAE	Khaled Issa
36	GK	UAE	Khalid Saif Al Sannani
55	GK	UAE	Ali Khasif
77	MF	UAE	Sultan Bargash
80	MF	UAE	Yaser Matar
TBA	FW	BRA	Ricardo Oliveira

== Transfers ==
=== In ===
Pos.	Player	Transferred from	Fee	Date	Source
FW	(Brazil) Baré	(United Arab Emirates) Al-Ahli	Undisclosed	8 July 2010	
MF	(Argentina) Matías Delgado	(Turkey) Beşiktaş	Dh10.5m	23 August 2010	

=== Out ===
Pos.	Player	Transferred to	Fee	Date	Source
FW	(Brazil) Rafael Sóbis	(Brazil) Internacional	Loan fee €980k	7 July 2010	
MF	(Ivory Coast) Tony Koutouan	(Qatar) Al-Arabi	Loan	2 February 2011	

== Pre-season and friendlies ==
28 July 2010	Wiener Neustadt (Austria)	2–3	(United Arab Emirates) Al Jazira	Austria
	30'; 34'	Report	Baré 53'; Matar 62'; Khater 72'

== Competitions ==
=== Overall record ===
Competition	First match	Last match	Starting round	Final position	Record							
Competition	First match	Last match	Starting round	Final position	Pld	W	D	L	GF	GA	GD	Win %
UAE Pro League	27 August 2010	5 June 2011	Matchday 1	Winners	22	16	5	1	64	27	+37	72.73
UAE President's Cup	20 September 2011	11 April 2011	Round 1	Winners	5	5	0	0	20	4	+16	100.00
Etisalat Emirates Cup	10 October 2011	22 January 2011	Group stage	Group stage	10	2	4	4	14	14	+0	20.00
AFC Champions League	1 March 2011	11 May 2011	Group stage	Group stage	6	0	1	5	7	20	−13	0.00
Total					43	23	10	10	105	65	+40	53.49

Source: Soccerway

=== UAE Pro League ===
==== League table ====
Pos	Team	Pld	W	D	L	GF	GA	GD	Pts	Qualification or relegation
1	Al Jazira (C)	22	16	5	1	64	27	+37	53	2012 AFC Champions League Group Stage
2	Baniyas	22	12	5	5	38	24	+14	41	2012 AFC Champions League Group Stage
3	Al Nasr	22	10	5	7	34	30	+4	35	2012 AFC Champions League Group Stage
4	Al Shabab	22	9	7	6	42	32	+10	34	2012 AFC Champions League Qualifying play-off (Note: Since Al-Jazira also won the 2010–11 UAE President's Cup, the fourth-placed team of the league also qualified for the 2012 AFC Champions League.)
5	Al Wahda	22	8	7	7	44	31	+13	31	2012 GCC Champions League

Source: UFL
Rules for classification: 1) points; 2) goal difference; 3) number of goals scored.
(C) Champions

==== Results summary ====
Overall								Home						Away					
Pld	W	D	L	GF	GA	GD	Pts	W	D	L	GF	GA	GD	W	D	L	GF	GA	GD
22	16	5	1	64	27	+37	53	9	2	0	39	12	+27	7	3	1	25	15	+10

==== Results by round ====
Round	1	2	3	4	5	6	7	8	9	10	11	12	13	14	15	16	17	18	19	20	21	22
Ground	H	A	H	A	H	A	H	A	A	H	A	A	H	A	H	A	H	A	H	H	A	H
Result	W	W	D	D	W	W	W	W	W	W	W	W	W	D	W	D	W	W	W	D	L	W
Position																						

A = Away; H = Home; W = Win; D = Draw; L = Loss

==== Matches ====
The Etisalat Pro League draw took place on 22 July 2010.

27 August 2010 1	Al Jazira	3–0	Al Nasr	Abu Dhabi
				Stadium: Mohammed bin Zayed Stadium

2 September 2010 2	Al Sharjah	1–2	Al Jazira	Sharjah
				Stadium: Sharjah Stadium

16 September 2010 3	Al Jazira	0–0	Al-Wahda	Abu Dhabi
				Stadium: Mohammed bin Zayed Stadium

24 September 2010 4	Al-Ahli	2–2	Al Jazira	Dubai
				Stadium: Rashid Stadium

1 October 2010 5	Al Jazira	4–0	Baniyas	Abu Dhabi
				Stadium: Mohammed bin Zayed Stadium

16 October 2010 6	Al-Dhafra	0–1	Al Jazira	Madinat Zayed

22 October 2010 7	Al Jazira	3–1	Al Wasl	Abu Dhabi
				Stadium: Mohammed bin Zayed Stadium

27 October 2010 8	Ittihad Kalba	3–4	Al Jazira	Kalba

12 December 2010 9	Al Shabab	0–2	Al Jazira	Dubai

19 December 2010 10	Al Jazira	4–0	Al Ain	Abu Dhabi
				Stadium: Mohammed bin Zayed Stadium

23 December 2010 11	Dubai Club	1–4	Al Jazira	Dubai

3 February 2011 12	Al Nasr	1–2	Al Jazira	Dubai

18 February 2011 13	Al Jazira	3–0	Al Sharjah	Abu Dhabi
				Stadium: Mohammed bin Zayed Stadium

25 March 2011 14	Al-Wahda	2–2	Al Jazira	Abu Dhabi

31 March 2011 15	Al Jazira	5–1	Al-Ahli	Abu Dhabi
				Stadium: Mohammed bin Zayed Stadium

15 April 2011 16	Baniyas	1–1	Al Jazira	Abu Dhabi

25 April 2011 17	Al Jazira	5–3	Al-Dhafra	Abu Dhabi
				Stadium: Mohammed bin Zayed Stadium

16 May 2011 18	Al Wasl	0–4	Al Jazira	Dubai

20 May 2011 19	Al Jazira	5–2	Ittihad Kalba	Abu Dhabi
				Stadium: Mohammed bin Zayed Stadium

28 May 2011 20	Al Jazira	3–3	Al Shabab	Abu Dhabi
				Stadium: Mohammed bin Zayed Stadium

1 June 2011 21	Al Ain	4–1	Al Jazira	Al Ain

5 June 2011 22	Al Jazira	4–2	Dubai Club	Abu Dhabi
				Stadium: Mohammed bin Zayed Stadium

=== UAE President's Cup ===
20 September 2010 Round 1	Al Jazira	7–0	Ras Al Khaimah

9 February 2011 Round of 16	Al Jazira	2–1	Al-Nasr

25 February 2011 Quarter-finals	Al Jazira	3–2	Emirates Club	Abu Dhabi
				Stadium: Mohammed bin Zayed Stadium

21 March 2011 Semi-finals	Al Shabab	1–4	Al Jazira	Abu Dhabi
				Stadium: Sheikh Zayed Stadium

11 April 2011 Final	Al Wahda	0–4	Al Jazira	Abu Dhabi
17:55 UTC+4			Baré 12', 80'; R. Oliveira 68'; Jumaa 90+3'	Stadium: Zayed Sports City Stadium

=== AFC Champions League ===
==== Group stage ====
Pos	Team	Pld	W	D	L	GF	GA	GD	Pts	Qualification	SEP	HIL	GHA	JAZ
1	(Iran) Sepahan	6	4	1	1	14	5	+9	13 (Note: Tiebreakers: Sepahan and Al-Hilal are ranked by their head-to-head records: Sepahan (4 pts), Al-Hilal (1 pt).)	Advance to knockout stage	—	1–1	2–0	5–1
2	(Saudi Arabia) Al-Hilal	6	4	1	1	11	6	+5	13	Advance to knockout stage	1–2	—	2–0	3–1
3	(Qatar) Al-Gharafa	6	2	1	3	6	7	−1	7		1–0	0–1	—	5–2
4	(United Arab Emirates) Al-Jazira	6	0	1	5	7	20	−13	1		1–4	2–3	0–0	—

Notes:

1 March 2011 1	Al Jazira (United Arab Emirates)	0–0	(Qatar) Al-Gharafa	Abu Dhabi
19:25 UTC+04:00		Report		Stadium: Mohamed Bin Zayid Stadium; Attendance: 9,625; Referee: Nawaf Shukralla (Bahrain)

15 March 2011 2	Sepahan (Iran)	5–1	(United Arab Emirates) Al Jazira	Isfahan
19:00 UTC+03:30	Jamshidian 2', 24'; Touré 56'; Janjuš 65'; Kazemian 90'	Report	Baré 54'	Stadium: Foolad Shahr Stadium; Attendance: 2,520; Referee: Malik Abdul Bashir (Singapore)

5 April 2011 3	Al-Hilal (Saudi Arabia)	3–1	(United Arab Emirates) Al Jazira	Riyadh
20:45 UTC+03:00	Kamel 4'; Al-Qahtani 14'; Al-Shalhoub 90+4'	Report	Jumaa 19'	Stadium: King Fahd International Stadium; Attendance: 13,421; Referee: Ben Williams (Australia)

20 April 2011 4	Al Jazira (United Arab Emirates)	2–3	(Saudi Arabia) Al-Hilal	Abu Dhabi
19:50 UTC+04:00	Mabkhout 44'; Qasem 45'	Report	Al-Qahtani 56', 65'; Rădoi 77' (pen.)	Stadium: Mohamed Bin Zayid Stadium; Attendance: 6,154; Referee: Masaaki Toma (Japan)

4 May 2011 5	Al-Gharafa (Qatar)	5–2	(United Arab Emirates) Al Jazira	Doha
19:00 UTC+03:00	Mahmoud 10', 62', 80'; Diané 48'; Al Zain 60'	Report	Jumaa 31'; Ricardo Oliveira 37' (pen.)	Stadium: Al-Gharafa Stadium; Attendance: 5,786; Referee: Valentin Kovalenko (Uzbekistan)

11 May 2011 6	Al Jazira (United Arab Emirates)	1–4	(Iran) Sepahan	Abu Dhabi
20:00 UTC+04:00	Baré 14'	Report	Kazemian 32'; Touré 60', 71'; Enayati 90+1'	Stadium: Mohamed Bin Zayid Stadium; Attendance: 2,265; Referee: Choi Myung-Yong (Korea Republic)

== Statistics ==
=== Goalscorers ===
Rank	No.	Pos.	Nat	Name	Pro League	President's Cup	Etisalat Cup	Champions League	Total
1	9	FW	(Brazil)	Baré	11	5	1	2	19
2	10	MF	(Ivory Coast)	Ibrahim Diaky	12	2	4	0	18
3	99	FW	(Brazil)	Ricardo Oliveira	11	4	0	1	16
4	7	FW	(United Arab Emirates)	Ahmed Jumaa	4	3	1	2	10
5	22	MF	(Argentina)	Matías Delgado	6	0	2	0	8
6		FW	(United Arab Emirates)	Ali Mabkhout	2	0	4	1	7
7	18	DF	(United Arab Emirates)	Abdullah Mousa	4	2	0	0	6
8		DF	(United Arab Emirates)	Jumaa Abdullah	4	2	0	0	6
9		MF	(United Arab Emirates)	Subait Khater	4	0	0	0	4
10	23	DF	(United Arab Emirates)	Khalid Sebil	3	0	0	0	3
11		MF	(Ivory Coast)	Tony	0	2	0	0	2
12		DF	(United Arab Emirates)	Saleh Abdulla	1	0	0	0	1
12	4	MF	(United Arab Emirates)	Yasser Matar	1	0	0	0	1
12		MF	(United Arab Emirates)	Abdullah Qasem	0	0	0	1	1
12		MF	(United Arab Emirates)	Mohamed Salem	0	0	1	0	1
Own goals					0	0	1	0	1
Totals					64	20	14	7	105
