= 2009–10 UAE Pro League =

UAE Pro League
- Season: 2009–10
- Champions: Al-Wahda
- Relegated: Ajman Club; Emirates Club
- Matches: 82
- Goals: 306 (3.73 per match)
- Top goalscorer: José Sand (23)
- Biggest home win: Al Ain 5–1 Ahli Dubai (8 Feb 2010)
- Biggest away win: Bani Yas 1–6 Al Ain (10 Jan 2010)
- Highest scoring: Al Dhafra 4–6 Al-Nasr (9 Jan 2010)
- Average attendance: 2,616

The 2009–10 UAE League season was the 35th edition of top-level football in the United Arab Emirates.

This was the second professional season in the history of the country.

Ahli Dubai were defending champions from the 2008–09 campaign.

Al Khaleej and Al-Shaab were relegated from the previous season.

Bani Yas Club and Emirates Club were promoted from the UAE Second Division.

The winners of the league qualified for the 2010 FIFA Club World Cup as the host representative.

== Members clubs ==
Club	Coach	City	Stadium	2008–2009 season	Notes
Al-Ahli	(Romania) Ioan Andone	Dubai	Rashed Stadium	2008–09 UAE Pro-League Champions	AFC Champions League 2010 Qualifier
Al-Jazira	(Brazil) Abel Braga	Abu Dhabi	Al Jazira Mohammed Bin Zayed Stadium	2nd in 2008–09 UAE Pro-League	AFC Champions League 2010 Qualifier
Al-Ain	(Germany) Winfried Schäfer	Al Ain	Sheikh Khalifa International Stadium	3rd in 2008–09 UAE Pro-League	AFC Champions League 2010 Qualifier
Al-Wahda	(Austria) Josef Hickersberger	Abu Dhabi	Al-Nahyan Stadium	4th in 2008–09 UAE Pro-League	AFC Champions League 2010 Playoff Qualifier
Al-Shabab	(Iraq) Abdul Wahab Abdul Qader	Dubai	Al Maktoum Stadium	5th in 2008–09 UAE Pro-League	Gulf Club Champions Cup 2009 Qualifier
Al-Wasl	(Costa Rica) Alexandre Guimarães	Dubai	Zabeel Stadium	6th in 2008–09 UAE Pro-League	Gulf Club Champions Cup 2009 Qualifier
Al-Nasr	(Germany) Frank Pagelsdorf	Dubai	Al-Maktoum Stadium	7th in 2008–09 UAE Pro-League	
Al-Dhafra	(France) Laurent Banide	Madinat Zayed	Al Dhafra Stadium	8th in 2008–09 UAE Pro-League	
Ajman	(Brazil) Zé Mário	Ajman	Ajman Stadium	9th in 2008–09 UAE Pro-League	
Sharjah	(Portugal) Manuel Cajuda	Sharjah	Sharjah Stadium	10th in 2008–09 UAE Pro-League	
Baniyas	(Tunisia) Faouzi Benzarti	Bani Yas	Tahnoun Bin Mohamed Stadium	Promoted	
Emirates	(Iran) Ebrahim Ghasempour	Ras al-Khaimah	Emirates Club Stadium	Promoted	

=== Stadia and locations ===
Locations of teams in the 2009-10 UAE Premier League

Club	Location	Stadium
Al-Ahli	Dubai	Rashed Stadium
Al-Jazira	Abu Dhabi	Al Jazira Mohammed Bin Zayed Stadium
Al-Ain	Al Ain	Sheikh Khalifa International Stadium
Al-Wahda	Abu Dhabi	Al-Nahyan Stadium
Al-Shabab	Dubai	Al Maktoum Stadium
Al-Wasl	Dubai	Zabeel Stadium
Al-Nasr	Dubai	Al-Maktoum Stadium
Al-Dhafra	Madinat Zayed	Al Dhafra Stadium
Ajman	Ajman	Ajman Stadium
Sharjah	Sharjah	Sharjah Stadium
Baniyas	Bani Yas	Tahnoun Bin Mohamed Stadium
Emirates	Ras al-Khaimah	Emirates Club Stadium

== Managerial changes ==
=== Pre-season ===
Team	Outgoing manager	Manner of departure	Replaced by
Sharjah	(Iraq) Abdul Wahab Abdul Qader	Short-term contract	(Portugal) Manuel Cajuda

=== During the season ===
Team	Outgoing manager	Manner of departure	Date of vacancy	Replaced by	Date of appointment	Position in table
Al-Shabab	(Brazil) Toninho Cerezo	Sacked	29 October 2009	(Iraq) Abdul Wahab Abdul Qader	29 October 2009	11th
Ajman	(Brazil) Zé Mário	Sacked	25 October 2009	(Tunisia) Ghazi Ghrairi	25 October 2009	12th
Al-Ahli	(Romania) Ioan Andone	Sacked	2 November 2009	(United Arab Emirates) Mahdi Ali	2 November 2009	10th
Al-Ain	(Germany) Winfried Schäfer	Sacked	2 December 2009	(Morocco) Rasheed Mahmoud (caretaker)	2 December 2009	3rd
Emirates	(Iran) Ebrahim Ghasempour	Sacked		(United Arab Emirates) Eid Baroot		
Al-Shabab	(Iraq) Abdul Wahab Abdul Qader	Sacked		(Brazil) Paulo Bonamigo		
Al-Ahli	(United Arab Emirates) Mahdi Ali	Sacked		(Tunisia) Nour el Din		
Al-Ahli	(Tunisia) Nour el Din	Sacked		(Netherlands) Henk ten Cate		
Al-Ahli	(Netherlands) Henk ten Cate	Resigned				
Al-Ain	(Brazil) Toninho Cerezo	Sacked (poor ACL performances)		(United Arab Emirates) Abdulhameed al Mishtiki (caretaker)		

== Foreign players ==
Club	Player 1	Player 2	Player 3	AFC player	Former players
Ajman	(Ivory Coast) Boris Kabi	(Morocco) Tarik Sektioui	(Togo) Mohamed Kader	(Oman) Hussain Al-Hadhri	(Iran) Javad Kazemian (Morocco) Mohamed Amine Najmi
Al-Ahli	(Brazil) Baré	(Brazil) Clederson	(Egypt) Hosny Abd Rabo	(Iran) Mehrzad Madanchi	
Al-Ain	(Argentina) José Sand	(Chile) Jorge Valdivia	(Qatar) Emerson Sheik	(South Korea) Lee Ho	
Al-Dhafra	(Algeria) Mehdi Méniri	(Algeria) Toufik Zerara	(Nigeria) Abass Lawal	(Bahrain) Mohamed Salmeen	(Brazil) Arthuro (Togo) Mohamed Kader
Al-Jazira	(Brazil) Márcio Rozário	(Ivory Coast) Antonin Koutouan	(Ivory Coast) Ibrahim Diaky	(Australia) Michael Beauchamp	(Brazil) Ricardo Oliveira
Al-Nasr	(Ecuador) Carlos Tenorio	(Morocco) Ali Boussaboun	(Romania) Ionuț Rada	(Iran) Mohammad Nosrati	(Morocco) Anouar Diba
Al-Shabab	(Brazil) Pedrão	(Brazil) Renato Abreu	(Chile) Carlos Villanueva		(Bahrain) Hussain Ali Baba
Sharjah	(Brazil) Éder Gaúcho	(Brazil) Marcelinho	(Brazil) Rafael Lima	(Iran) Maziar Zare	(Iraq) Mustafa Karim
Al-Wahda	(Brazil) Fernando Baiano	(Brazil) Magrão	(Brazil) Pinga	(Oman) Hassan Mudhafar Al-Gheilani	
Al-Wasl	(Brazil) Alexandre Oliveira	(Brazil) Élton Arábia	(Morocco) Soufiane Alloudi	(Oman) Mohammed Al-Balushi	(Brazil) Douglas (Brazil) Valdomiro (Panama) Blas Pérez
Baniyas	(Ivory Coast) Modibo Kane Diarra	(Senegal) André Senghor			
Emirates	(Algeria) Karim Kerkar	(Morocco) Hassan Taïr	(Morocco) Nabil Daoudi	(Iran) Javad Kazemian	(Iran) Maziar Zare

== Standings ==
Pos	Team	Pld	W	D	L	GF	GA	GD	Pts	Qualification or relegation
1	Al-Wahda (C)	22	19	1	2	42	15	+27	58	2010 FIFA Club World Cup play-off stage and 2011 AFC Champions League group stage
2	Al-Jazira	22	15	6	1	48	26	+22	51	2011 AFC Champions League group stage (Note: Emirates Club, which played in the UAE Division 1 Group A, also secured 2011 AFC Champions League group stage qualification by winning the 2009–10 UAE President's Cup.)
3	Al-Ain	22	14	3	5	57	29	+28	45	2011 AFC Champions League qualifying play-off
4	Baniyas	22	10	6	6	44	37	+7	36	
5	Al-Wasl	22	8	5	9	41	40	+1	29	
6	Sharjah	22	7	7	8	37	36	+1	28	
7	Al-Shabab	22	8	4	10	35	44	−9	28	2011 Gulf Club Champions Cup
8	Al-Ahli	22	7	5	10	42	43	−1	26	2011 Gulf Club Champions Cup
9	Al-Dhafra	22	7	5	10	47	55	−8	26	2011 Gulf Club Champions Cup
10	Al-Nasr	22	7	2	13	37	49	−12	23	
11	Emirates (R)	22	4	2	16	37	57	−20	14	Relegation
12	Ajman (R)	22	2	2	18	29	68	−39	8	Relegation

Source: goalzz.com
Rules for classification: 1) points; 2) goal difference; 3) number of goals scored.
(C) Champions; (R) Relegated
Notes:

UAE League 2009–10 winners

4th title

== Fixtures and results ==
Home \ Away	ALI	AIN	AJM	JAZ	NAS	SHA	WAH	WAS	YAS	DHA	EMI	SHR
Al-Ahli		1–5	8–0	2–4	4–2	1–0	1–3	1–1	2–2	4–4	2–1	1–1
Al-Ain	5–1		3–2	0–1	2–0	4–0	0–1	1–3	3–1	1–1	5–3	2–1
Ajman	0–3	4–5		1–1	0–3	0–2	2–5	5–4	2–4	4–1	1–3	1–4
Al-Jazira	1–0	2–2	2–1		2–0	2–1	1–0	2–1	5–3	2–2	3–2	1–1
Al-Nasr	1–2	0–2	2–0	1–5		3–2	0–1	3–1	1–2	3–3	4–1	1–4
Al-Shabab	3–1	2–5	3–0	1–2	3–2		1–1	4–3	1–1	1–2	3–2	1–1
Al-Wahda	2–1	1–0	3–2	2–1	3–0	4–1		2–0	1–0	2–0	3–1	1–0
Al-Wasl	0–0	1–3	2–1	2–2	0–0	2–0	1–0		3–3	2–0	5–0	0–2
Baniyas	1–0	1–6	1–1	1–1	2–3	4–0	1–2	2–1		4–1	4–0	3–3
Al-Dhafra	5–4	2–1	4–2	0–2	4–6	2–3	1–2	2–3	0–1		4–3	1–1
Emirates	1–3	0–1	2–0	1–2	4–1	1–1	1–2	4–5	1–2	2–3		3–2
Sharjah	1–0	1–1	4–1	2–4	2–1	1–2	0–3	4–2	0–1	1–5	1–1	

Updated to match(es) played on 7 May 2010. Source:
Legend: Blue = home team win; Yellow = draw; Red = away team win.

== Top scorers ==
24 goals

- (Argentina) José Sand (Al-Ain)

18 goals

- (Brazil) Fernando Baiano (Al-Wahda)
- (Ecuador) Carlos Tenorio (Al-Nasr)

15 goals

- (Brazil) Marcelinho (Sharjah)

14 goals

- (Nigeria) Abass Lawal (Al-Dhafra)

13 goals

- (Senegal) André Senghor (Baniyas)

12 goals

- (Ivory Coast) Modibo Kane Diarra (Baniyas)
- (Ivory Coast) Antonin Koutouan (Al-Jazira)
- (United Arab Emirates) Mohammed Salem Saleh (Al-Dhafra)
- (Brazil) Pinga (Al-Wahda)
- (Brazil) Pedrão (Al-Shabab)

11 goals

- (Brazil) Baré (Al-Ahli)

10 goals

- (Morocco) Nabil Daoudi (Emirates)
- (United Arab Emirates) Ahmed Khalil (Al-Ahli)

== Season statistics ==
=== Scoring ===
- First goal of the season: Jassim Ali Mohamed for Ajman against Al-Dhafra, 8 minutes (25 September 2009).
- Fastest goal in a match: 2 minutes – Marcelinho for Al Sharjah against Ajman (6 November 2009).
- Goal scored at the latest point in a match: 93 minutes – Ali Boussaboun for Al-Nasr against Al-Jazira (5 December 2009).
- Widest winning margin: 6 Goals
  - Bani Yas 1–6 Al Ain (10 Jan 2010).
  - Al Dhafra 4–6 Al-Nasr (9 Jan 2010).
- Most goals in a match: 10 Goals
  - Bani Yas 1–6 Al Ain (10 Jan 2010).
  - Al Dhafra 4–6 Al-Nasr (9 Jan 2010).
- Most goals in a match by one team: 6 Goals
  - Al Dhafra 4–6 Al-Nasr (9 Jan 2010).
  - Bani Yas 1–6 Al Ain (10 Jan 2010).
- Most goals scored by losing team: 4 goals
  - Al Dhafra 4–6 Al-Nasr (9 Jan 2010).
- Most goals in a match by one player: 5 goals
  - Tenorio for Al-Nasr against Al Dhafra (9 Jan 2010).
- First own goal of the season: Abdullah Darwish (Al-Shabab) for Al Wasl, 22 minutes (4 October 2009).
- First hat-trick of the season: José Sand for Al Ain against Al-Ahli (2 October 2009).

=== Discipline ===
- First red card of the season: Ahmed Ali Abdullah for Ajman against Al-Dhafra, 41 minute (25 September 2009).

=== Red Card Stats ===
- Total red cards: 21 Card

Player	Nationality	Club
Ahmed Ali	United Arab Emirates	(United Arab Emirates) Ajman
Kadem Ali	United Arab Emirates	(United Arab Emirates) Al-Nasr
Yousef Mousa	United Arab Emirates	(United Arab Emirates) Emirates
Yaser Salem	United Arab Emirates	(United Arab Emirates) Al-Wasl
Majed Naser	United Arab Emirates	(United Arab Emirates) Al-Wasl
Carlos Villanueva	Chile	(United Arab Emirates) Al-Shabbab
	United Arab Emirates	(United Arab Emirates) Al-Sharjah
Abdallah Darwish	United Arab Emirates	(United Arab Emirates) Al-Shabbab
Knith Akojbado	Nigeria	(United Arab Emirates) Al Dhafra
Esam Dahi	United Arab Emirates	(United Arab Emirates) Al-Shabbab
Redha Abdulhadi	United Arab Emirates	(United Arab Emirates) Ajman
Hassan Zahran	United Arab Emirates	(United Arab Emirates) Bani Yas
	United Arab Emirates	(United Arab Emirates) Emirates
Kadem Ali	United Arab Emirates	(United Arab Emirates) Al-Nasr
Hassan Ali	United Arab Emirates	(United Arab Emirates) Al-Ahli
Mahboob Juma	United Arab Emirates	(United Arab Emirates) Ajman
Musallam Ahmed	United Arab Emirates	(United Arab Emirates) Emirates
Mohamed Amine Najmi	Morocco	(United Arab Emirates) Ajman
Hassan Zahran	United Arab Emirates	(United Arab Emirates) Bani Yas
Ali Mohamed	United Arab Emirates	(United Arab Emirates) Emirates
Mohammed Al Balushi	Oman	(United Arab Emirates) Al Wasl

== See also ==
- 2009–10 Al Wasl F.C. season
- 2009–10 Al Ain Club season
