= Ali Mabkhout =

Emirati footballer (born 1990)

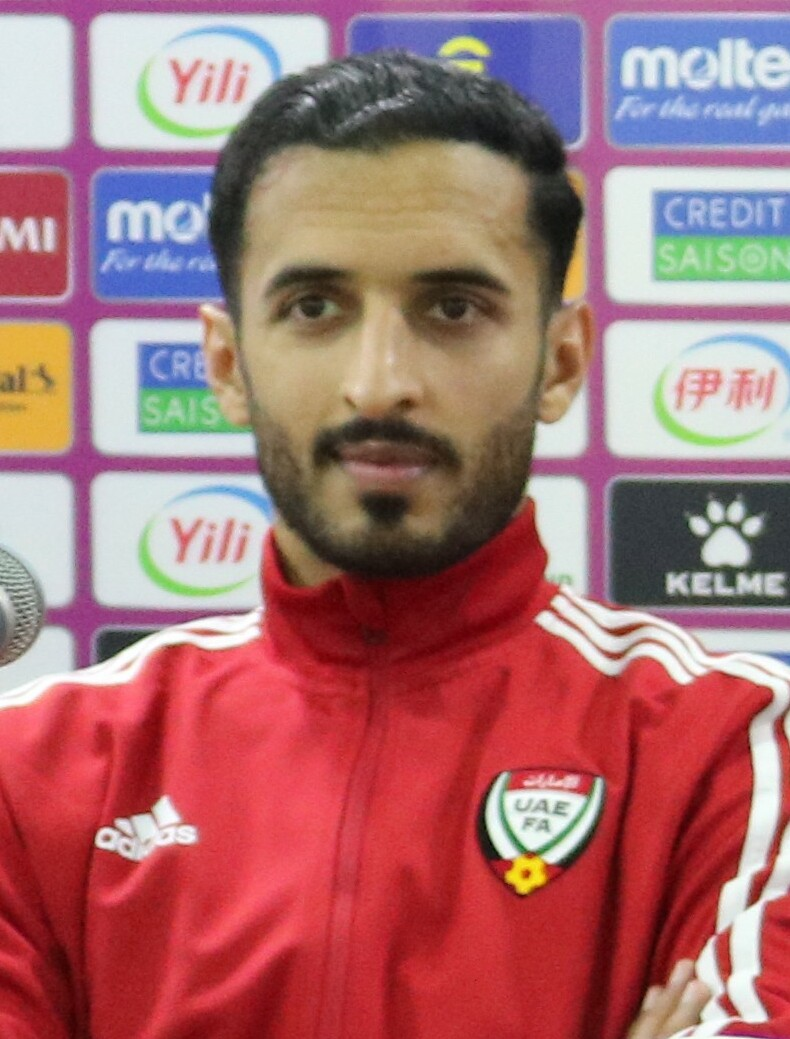
- Mabkhout with the United Arab Emirates in 2021

Personal information
- Full name: Ali Ahmed Mabkhout Mohsen Imran Al Hajeri
- Date of birth: 5 October 1990 (age 36)
- Place of birth: Abu Dhabi, United Arab Emirates
- Height: 1.80 m (5 ft 11 in)
- Position: Forward

Youth career
- 2004–2008: Al Jazira

Senior career*
Years	Team	Apps	(Gls)
2008–2024	Al Jazira	300	(218)
2024–2026	Al-Nasr	20	(10)

International career
2008–2009	United Arab Emirates U20	10	(6)
2012	United Arab Emirates U23	16	(9)
2009–2024	United Arab Emirates	115	(85)
Medal record
Representing United Arab Emirates
Men's Football
AFC Asian Cup
Third place	2015 Australia
Asian Games
Silver medal – second place	2010 Guangzhou
Gulf Cup
Winner	2013 Bahrain
Runner-up	2018 Kuwait
Third place	2014 Saudi Arabia
GCC U-23 Championship
Winner	2010 Qatar
- * Club domestic league appearances and goals as of 4 April 2025

Ali Ahmed Mabkhout (Arabic: عَلِيّ أَحْمَد مَبْخُوت مُحْسِن عِمْرَان الْهَاجِرِيّ; born 5 October 1990) is an Emirati professional footballer who plays as a forward.

Coming through the youth system, Mabkhout made his debut for Al Jazira's first team in 2009. After spending 16 years at the club, during which time he made 300 appearances and scored 218 goals, he transferred to Al-Nasr in 2024.

Mabkhout is all the all-time top scorer for the United Arab Emirates national football team, with 85 goals.

== Club career ==
Mabkhout made his AFC Champions League debut against Al Ittihad on 22 April 2009, after coming on as a substitute. On 19 May 2009, he scored his first Asian Champions League goal in the 49th minute against Esteghlal in a 2–2 draw.

Mabkhout formed a partnership with Ricardo Oliveira, his teammate from 2009 to 2014، this partnership was said to contribute towards the development of Mabkhout's talents in his formative years.

== International career ==
In the quarter-final of the 2015 AFC Asian Cup, Mabkhout scored the opening goal of a 1–1 draw with Japan at Stadium Australia in Sydney; he went on to convert his penalty kick as the UAE defeated the defending champions 5–4 in a penalty shootout.

During the 2019 AFC Asian Cup quarter-finals hosted by the United Arab Emirates, Mabkhout netted the only goal in a 1–0 victory over defending champions Australia, which qualified his country to the semi-finals.

On 10 October 2019, Mabkhout scored a hat-trick against Indonesia in a 5–0 win to become UAE's all-time leading goalscorer. (Note: Mabkhout's three goals against Sri Lanka on 31 August 2019 were initially considered in an unofficial friendly; hence he become the UAE's all-time leading goalscorer when he scored two goals against Malaysia on 10 September 2019.)

Mabkhout was called up for the 2023 AFC Asian Cup in Qatar, yet he surprisingly was not able to feature in any match during the competition under coach Paulo Bento.

== Career statistics ==
=== Club ===
As of match played 4 April 2025

Appearances and goals by club, season and competition
Club	Season	League			UAE President's Cup		UAE League Cup		Continental		Other		Total	
Club	Season	Division	Apps	Goals	Apps	Goals	Apps	Goals	Apps	Goals	Apps	Goals	Apps	Goals
Al Jazira	2008–09	UAE Pro League	4	2	0	0	0	0	3 (Note: Appearances in AFC Champions League)	1	–		7	3
Al Jazira	2009–10	UAE Pro League	16	3	8	3	0	0	6	0	–		30	6
Al Jazira	2010–11	UAE Pro League	8	2	6	4	0	0	5	1	–		19	7
Al Jazira	2011–12	UAE Pro League	12	3	4	2	3	0	2	0	–		21	5
Al Jazira	2012–13	UAE Pro League	24	11	2	0	2	1	5	1	–		33	13
Al Jazira	2013–14	UAE Pro League	19	7	0	0	2	1	8	3	–		29	11
Al Jazira	2014–15	UAE Pro League	24	16	1	0	0	0	1	1	–		26	17
Al Jazira	2015–16	UAE Pro League	23	23	4	5	0	0	5	2	–		32	30
Al Jazira	2016–17	UAE Pro League	25	33	2	1	1	0	4	1	1 (Note: Appearance in UAE Super Cup)	0	33	35
Al Jazira	2017–18	UAE Pro League	16	13	4	1	2	1	7	5	5 (Note: One appearance in UAE Super Cup, four appearances and one goal in FIFA Club World Cup)	1	34	21
Al Jazira	2018–19	UAE Pro League	19	20	1	0	0	0	–		–		20	20
Al Jazira	2019–20	UAE Pro League	19	13	2	1	4	0	–		–		25	14
Al Jazira	2020–21	UAE Pro League	26	25	1	0	0	0	–		–		27	25
Al Jazira	2021–22	UAE Pro League	20	10	0	0	1	0	5	1	2 (Note: Appearances in FIFA Club World Cup)	0	28	11
Al Jazira	2022–23	UAE Pro League	25	27	2	1	5	2	–		–		32	30
Al Jazira	2023–24	UAE Pro League	20	10	1	0	4	1	–		–		25	11
Total			300	218	56	18	24	6	51	16	8	1	439	259
Al-Nasr	2024–25	UAE Pro League	20	10	1	0	4	2	–		7 (Note: Four appearances and four goals in AGCFF Gulf Club Champions League, one appearance and two goals in Emirati-Qatari Super Cup)	6	32	18
Career total			320	228	57	18	28	8	51	16	15	7	461	277

=== International ===
Appearances and goals by national team and year
National team	Year	Apps	Goals
United Arab Emirates	2009	1	1
United Arab Emirates	2010	1	1
United Arab Emirates	2011	0	0
United Arab Emirates	2012	6	5
United Arab Emirates	2013	11	11
United Arab Emirates	2014	15	5
United Arab Emirates	2015	14	13
United Arab Emirates	2016	8	3
United Arab Emirates	2017	9	6
United Arab Emirates	2018	6	2
United Arab Emirates	2019	15	19
United Arab Emirates	2020	2	5
United Arab Emirates	2021	16	14
United Arab Emirates	2022	5	1
United Arab Emirates	2023	5	4
United Arab Emirates	2024	1	0
Total		115	85

== Honours ==
Al Jazira

- UAE Pro League: 2010–11, 2016–17, 2020–21
- UAE President's Cup: 2010–11, 2011–12, 2015–16
- UAE League Cup: 2009–10
- UAE Super Cup: 2021
- FIFA Club World Cup 2017: Fourth place

United Arab Emirates U23

- GCC U-23 Championship: 2010
- Asian Games silver medal: 2010

United Arab Emirates

- Arabian Gulf Cup: 2013
- AFC Asian Cup third place: 2015

Individual

- UAE Pro League top scorer: 2016–17, 2020–21
- AGCFF Gulf Club Champions League top scorer: 2024–25
- Arabian Gulf Cup top scorer: 2014, 2019
- AFC Asian Cup top scorer: 2015
- AFC Asian Cup Team of the Tournament: 2015, 2019

== See also ==
- List of top international men's football goalscorers by country
- List of men's footballers with 100 or more international caps
- List of men's footballers with 50 or more international goals
