= 2008–09 Al Wasl FC season =

This is a list of Al Wasl SC football transfers for the 2008-09 season.

== Transfers to Al Wasl ==
Name	Nat	Moving from	Fee
Yousif Hassan	(United Arab Emirates)	(United Arab Emirates) Al-Shaab (UAE)	AED 3.5 Millions
Waleed Murad	(United Arab Emirates)	(United Arab Emirates) AlNasr Dubai	AED 6 Millions
Eman Mobali	(Iran)	(United Arab Emirates) Al-Shabab (UAE)	Free
Coach Miroslav Beránek	(Czech Republic)	(Hungary) Debreceni VSC	Undisclosed
Saud Suhail	(United Arab Emirates)	(United Arab Emirates) Al-Oroobah	Undisclosed
Ahmed Ibrahimoh	(United Arab Emirates)	(United Arab Emirates) Al-Rams	Undisclosed
Zeka Goore	(Ivory Coast)	(Egypt) Petrojet	US$200,000
Coach Srećko Juričić	(Croatia)	Bahrain Riffa Club	Undisclosed
Saeed Al Kass	(United Arab Emirates)	(United Arab Emirates) Sharjah FC	Free
Ali Msarri	(United Arab Emirates)	(United Arab Emirates) Al Ain Club	Loan
Juma Abdulla	(United Arab Emirates)	(United Arab Emirates) Al Ain Club	Loan
Fadel Ahmad	(United Arab Emirates)	(United Arab Emirates) Al Ain Club	Loan
Yousuf Abdul Aziz	(United Arab Emirates)	(United Arab Emirates) AlNasr Dubai	Undisclosed
Fabio Firmani	(Italy)	(Italy) S.S. Lazio	Loan

== Transfers from AlWasl ==
Name	Nat	Moving To	Fee
Mohamed Salim Al Enezi	(United Arab Emirates)	(United Arab Emirates) AlNasr Dubai	Undisclosed
André Dias	(Brazil)	(United Arab Emirates) Al Ain Club	Free
Abdullah Al Kamali	(United Arab Emirates)	(Brazil) Clube Atlético Paranaense	Free
Coach Zé Mário	(Brazil)	AlArabi Qatar	Free
Mohammad Mobarak	(United Arab Emirates)	(United Arab Emirates) Dhafra	Undisclosed
Adel Mohammad	(United Arab Emirates)	(United Arab Emirates) Al-Shabab (UAE)	Loan
Talal Fahad	(United Arab Emirates)	(United Arab Emirates) Al-Shabab (UAE)	Loan
Jassim Mobarak	(United Arab Emirates)	(United Arab Emirates) Al-Shaab (UAE)	Loan
Coach Miroslav Beránek	(Czech Republic)	Sacked	Sacked
Coach Srećko Juričić	(Croatia)	Sacked	Sacked
Coach Khalifa Mobarak	(United Arab Emirates)	Resigned	Resigned
Zeka Goore	(Ivory Coast)	(Egypt) ENPPI Club	US$350,000
Khalid Darwish	(United Arab Emirates)	(United Arab Emirates) Al-Shabab (UAE)	Loan
Khalaf Esmail	(United Arab Emirates)	(United Arab Emirates) Al-Shabab (UAE)	Loan

== Other Seasons ==
- 2009–10 Al Wasl SC season
- 2010–11 Al Wasl SC season
