= Goore =

Goore is a surname. Notable people with the surname include:

- Charles Goore (1701–1783), English merchant and politician
- Dacosta Goore (born 1984), Ivorian footballer
- Zeka Goore (born 1984), Ivorian footballer

== See also ==
- Gore (surname)
