= Ibraheem Al-Alawi =

Emirati association football player (born 1991)

Ibraheem Al-Alawi إبراهيم العلوي
Personal information
- Full name: Ibraheem Saeed Muftah Al-Alawi
- Date of birth: 10 October 1991 (age 35)
- Place of birth: Emirates
- Height: 1.73 m (5 ft 8 in)
- Position: Right back

Youth career
- 2005–2011: Al-Wahda

Senior career*
Years	Team	Apps	(Gls)
2011–2013	Al-Wahda	4	(0)
2013–2014	Al-Wasl	14	(0)
2014–2016	Al-Fujairah	45	(0)
2016–2018	Al-Dhafra	2	(0)
2022–2023	Hatta		
- * Club domestic league appearances and goals

Ibraheem Al-Alawi (Arabic:إبراهيم العلوي) (born 10 October 1991) is an Emirati footballer who plays as a right back.

== Career ==
=== Al-Wahda ===
Al-Alawi started his career at Al-Wahda and is a product of the Al-Wahda's youth system. On 26 October 2017, Al-Alawi made his professional debut for Al-Wahda against Dubai in the Pro League, replacing Khaled Jalal.

=== Al-Wasl ===
On season 2013, left Al-Wahda and signed with Al-Wasl. On 27 September 2013, Al-Alawi made his professional debut for Al-Wasl against All-Shaab in the Pro League, replacing Khalifa Abdullah.

=== Al-Fujairah ===
On 3 July 2014, left Al-Wasl and signed with Al-Fujairah. On 15 September 2014, Al-Alawi made his professional debut for Al-Fujairah against Emirates Club in the Pro League.

=== Al-Dhafra ===
On 2 June 2016, left Al-Fujairah and signed with Al-Dhafra. On 28 April 2016, Al-Alawi made his professional debut for Al-Dhafa against Al-Shabab in the Pro League, replacing Abdulrahim Jumaa.
