= Abdulla Al Kamali =

Emirati footballer (born 1989)

Personal information
- Full name: Abdulla Ali Mohammad Al Kamali
- Date of birth: December 9, 1989 (age 36)
- Place of birth: Dubai, United Arab Emirates
- Height: 1.70 m (5 ft 7 in)
- Position: Striker

Youth career
- 1997–2002: Sharjah
- 2002–2007: Al Wasl

Senior career*
Years	Team	Apps	(Gls)
2007–2008	Al Wasl		
2008–2009	Atlético-PR	0	(0)
2009–2010	Al-Ahli	2	(0)
2011–2013	Al Sharjah	11	(1)

International career
2007–2008	UAE U18	?	(5)
	UAE U20	?	(18)
- * Club domestic league appearances and goals as of October 2, 2011

Abdulla Ali Mohammad Al Kamali (born December 9, 1989), or simply Abdulla, is an Emirati football striker. He currently plays for Al Sharjah SC in the UAE Football League.

Al Kamali made his professional debut for Al Wasl in UAE League, being the top goalscorer of the reserves league. He scored 18 goals for the UAE national under-20 football team, and five goals for the UAE national under-18 football team during the 2007–2008 season.

== Career ==
=== Atlético Paranaense ===
He is the first UAE player and second from the Arab world, after Khaled Kharroubi of Algeria, to have signed a professional contract with a first division football club in the Brazilian league.

=== Al-Ahli ===
He joined Al-Ahli in 2009. And before the beginning of the 2010-11 season he was released from the club as per the coach David O'Leary recommendation.

== Career Statistics ==
=== Club ===
Club	Season	League			Cup^{2}			Asia^{1}			Total		
Club	Season	Apps	Goals	Assists	Apps	Goals	Assists	Apps	Goals	Assists	Apps	Goals	Assists
Al-Ahli	2009–10	2	0	0	0	0	0	0	0	0	0	0	0
Al-Ahli	Total	2	0	0	0	0	0	0	0	0	0	0	0
Career Totals		2	0	0	0	0	0	0	0	0	0	0	0

^{1}Continental competitions include the AFC Champions League
^{2}Other tournaments include the UAE President Cup and Etisalat Emirates Cup, FIFA Club World Cup
