= Youssef Hassan =

Youssef Hassan may refer to:

- Yousef Hassan (born 1996), Qatari football goalkeeper for Al-Gharafa
- Youssef Hassan (footballer), Egyptian football striker for Pioneers
- Yousif Hassan, UAE footballer
