= 2010–11 UAE President's Cup =

Tournament details
- Country: United Arab Emirates

Final positions
- Champions: Al Jazira
- Runners-up: Al Wahda

The 2010–11 UAE President's Cup is the 35th season of the UAE President's Cup, the premier knockout tournament for association football clubs in the United Arab Emirates.

The format once again changed from the previous season, reverting to a knockout tournament rather than a round-robin groups phase.

The cup winner were guaranteed a place in the 2012 AFC Champions League.

== Round 1 ==
Round 1 consisted of fourteen matches played on 20–21 September 2010. The winners of those matches advanced to Round 2, joining defending cup winners Emirates Club and UAE Pro-League winners Al Wahda.

| Team 1 | Score | Team 2 |
|---|---|---|
20 September 2010
| Al Ahli | 4–0 | Al Rams |
| Al Dhafra | 6–0 | Dibba Al-Hisn |
| Al Quwwat Al Musallaha | 2–0 | Al Jazira Al Hamra |
| Al Sharjah | 1–1 (5–6 pen) | Masafi |
| Al Wasl | 8–0 | Al Taawon |
| Ajman | 9–1 | Hatta |
| Al Ain | 5–0 | Masfout |
| Dubai | 1–2 | Dibba Al Fujairah |
| Al Jazira | 7–0 | Ras Al Khaima |
21 September 2010
| Al Nasr | 4–2 | Al Arabi |
| Al Orouba | 2–1 | Al Fujairah |
| Baniyas | 4–1 | Al Khaleej |
| Al-Ittihad Kalba | 2–4 | Al-Thaid |
| Al Shabab | 1–0 | Al Shaab |

== Round of 16 ==
The matches were played on 9–11 February 2011.

| Team 1 | Score | Team 2 |
|---|---|---|
9 February 2011
| Al Jazira | 2–1 | Al Nasr |
| Al Wahda | 5–1 | Ajman |
| Masafi Club | 0–3^{1} | Al Ain |
| Al Ahli | 1–0 | Al Dhafra |
11 February 2011
| Baniyas | 0–2 | Al Shabab |
| Al Wasl | 1–0 | Al Quwwat Al Musallaha |
| Al-Thaid | 2–1 | Dubba Al Fujairah |
| Emirates Club | 4–1 | Al Orouba |

^{1} Al Ain were found to have used an ineligible player and were disqualified, Masafi went through.

== Quarterfinals ==
The matches will be played on 24–25 February 2011.

24 February 2011

| Al Wahda | 2 – 0 | Masafi Club |

24 February 2011

| Al Ahli | 0 – 1 | Al Wasl |

25 February 2011

| Al-Thaid | 0 – 3 | Al Shabab |

25 February 2011

| Al Jazira | 3 – 2 | Emirates Club |

== Semifinals ==
Sunday 20 March

| Al Wahda | 2 – 1 | Al Wasl |

Sheikh Zayed Stadium, Abu Dhabi

| Al Shabab | 1 – 4 | Al Jazira |

Sheikh Zayed Stadium, Abu Dhabi

== Final ==
Monday 11 April
17:55 UTC+4

| Al Wahda | 0 – 4 | Al Jazira |
|---|---|---|
| | | Baré 12', 80'; R. Oliveira 68'; Jumaa 90+3' |

Sheikh Zayed Stadium, Abu Dhabi

== Top goalscorers ==
Last updated 10 February 2011

| Goalscorers | Goals | Team |
|---|---|---|
| (Brazil) Fernando Baiano | 4 | Al Wahda |
| (United Arab Emirates) Rashid Eissa | 3 | Al Wasl |
| (Guinea) Ismaël Bangoura | 3 | Al Nasr |
| (Senegal) Papa Georges | 3 | Ajman |
| (Ivory Coast) Toni | 2 | Al Jazira |
| (France) Gregory Dufrennes | 2 | Ittihad Kalba |
| (Ivory Coast) Ibrahim Diaky | 2 | Al Jazira |
| (Oman) Mohammed Zahran | 2 | Ajman |
| (Senegal) André Senghor | 2 | Baniyas |
| (United Arab Emirates) Abdul-Rahman Khalfan | 2 | Al Wasl |
| (Brazil) Bare | 2 | Al Jazira |
