= Mohamed Amine Najmi =

Moroccan footballer

Najmi
Personal information
- Full name: Mohamed Amine Najmi
- Date of birth: 8 May 1981 (age 45)
- Place of birth: Khouribga, Morocco
- Height: 1.85 m (6 ft 1 in)
- Position: Defender

Senior career*
Years	Team	Apps	(Gls)
2007–2011	OC Khouribga	38	(14)
2009–2010	→ Ajman Club (loan)		
2011–2012	Al Arabi		
2012–2013	RS Berkane	4	(0)
2013–2014	Maghreb de Fès	4	(0)

International career
2011	Morocco	1	(0)
- * Club domestic league appearances and goals as of 21 May 2021

Mohamed Amine Najmi (born 8 May 1981), commonly known as Najmi, is a Moroccan former footballer who played as defender.
