= Moosinning =

- Municipality
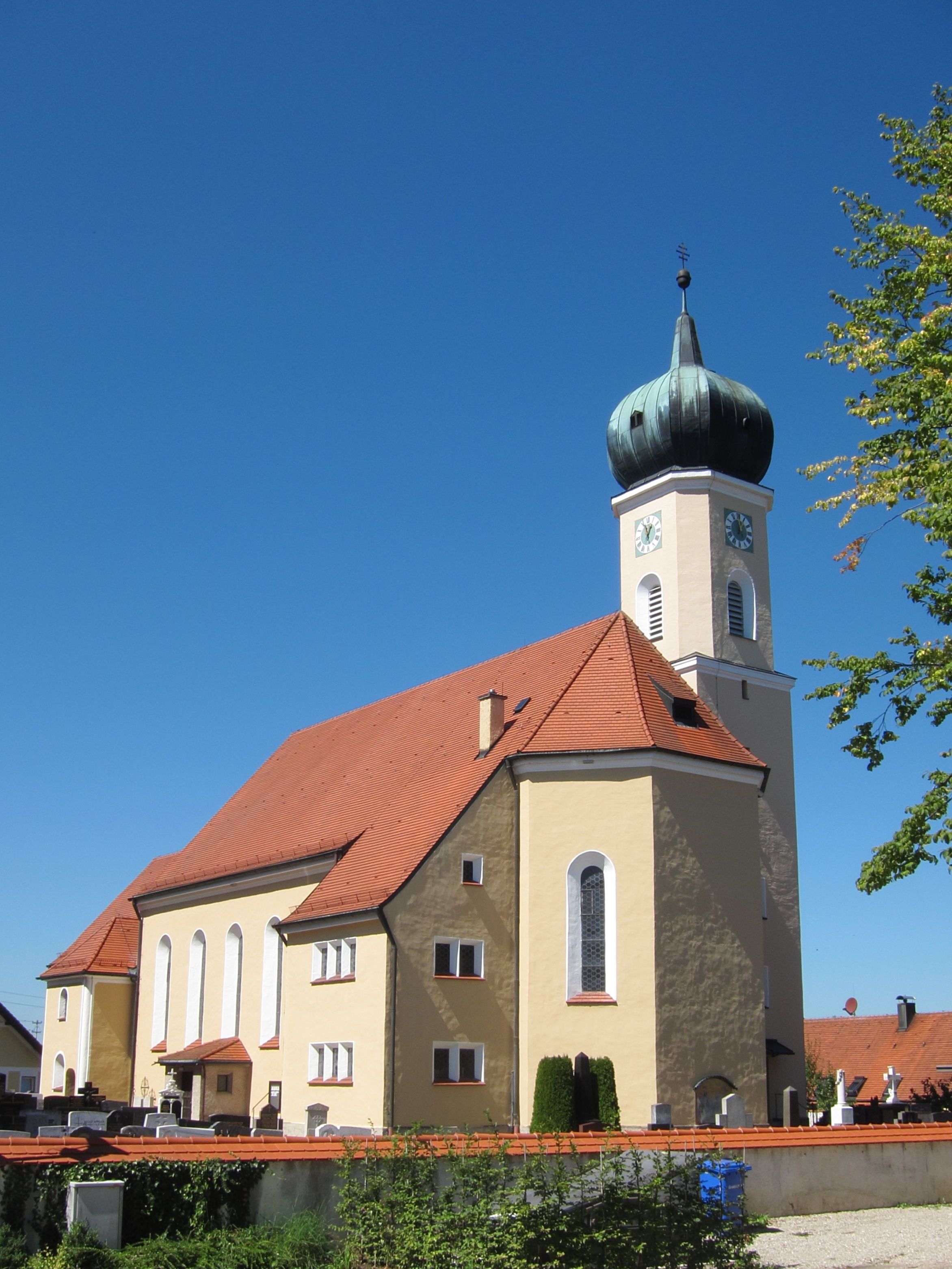
- Church of Saint Emmeram

- Coat of arms

- Location of Moosinning within Erding district
- Interactive map of Moosinning
- Location within Germany Location within Bavaria
- Coordinates: 48°17′N 11°51′E
- Country: Germany
- State: Bavaria
- Admin. region: Oberbayern
- District: Erding

Government
  - Mayor (2020–26): Georg Nagler (SPD)

Area
  - Total: 39.96 km^{2} (15.43 sq mi)
- Elevation: 489 m (1,604 ft)

Population (2025-12-31)
  - Total: 6,064
  - Density: 151.8/km^{2} (393.0/sq mi)
- Time zone: UTC+01:00 (CET)
  - Summer (DST): UTC+02:00 (CEST)
- Postal codes: 85452
- Dialling codes: 08123
- Vehicle registration: ED
- Website: www.moosinning.de

Moosinning is a municipality in the district of Erding in Upper Bavaria, Germany. It is located in the Erdinger Moos about 7 km southwest of the district capital Erding, 16 km from Munich Airport, and 32 km from the Bavarian state capital Munich. The municipality includes the main village of Moosinning and ten other settlements. Its territory contains parts of the Zengermoos and Gfällach nature reserves, and it lies within the Munich metropolitan region.

== Geography ==
=== Location ===
The municipality is situated in the Munich region within the Erdinger Moos, roughly 7 km southwest of Erding, 16 km from Munich Airport, 23 km from Freising, and about 32 km from the state capital Munich. The eastern airport tangent road (Flughafentangente Ost) runs just east of Moosinning, providing relief from through traffic for the village and offering excellent access to the A92 and A94 motorways.

The village of Moosinning lies at an elevation of 470 m above NHN, while the highest point in the municipality is the Adelberg at approximately 500 m above NHN.

=== Nature reserves ===
- Interglacial deposits near Eichenried (Geotope number 177A001).
- The Zengermoos Nature Reserve (NSG-00491.01, a birch forest ecosystem covering 252.6 hectares) is located in the northwest of the municipal area, immediately north of Zengermoos.
- The Gfällach Nature Reserve (NSG-00379.01, a fen covering 6.7 hectares) is situated in the far south of the municipal area, south of Eichenried.

=== Municipal composition ===
The municipality comprises eleven Ortsteile (settlement type in brackets):

- Burgholz (Einöde)
- Eching (Dorf)
- Eder a.Holz (Einöde)
- Eichenried (Pfarrdorf)
- Kempfing (Kirchdorf)
- Moosinning (Pfarrdorf)
- Riexing (Weiler)
- Schnabelmoos (Weiler)
- Sollnberg (Einöde)
- Stammham (Weiler)
- Zengermoos (Dorf)

There is only the single Gemarkung (cadastral area) of Moosinning.

== History ==
=== Until the foundation of the municipality ===
Moosinning was first mentioned in a document in 1031 as "Inning", recorded as a possession of the Imperial Abbey of St. Emmeram. It was the seat of a provostry of St. Emmeram and remained closely linked to the abbey, which held manorial and, in part, lower jurisdiction rights, until the secularization in 1803. In terms of territorial lordship, however, Moosinning belonged to the Rentamt Landshut and the Landgericht Erding of the Electorate of Bavaria. The provostry, which temporarily became part of the Principality of Regensburg, was not dissolved until 1810.

=== From 1818 onwards ===
In 1818, the municipality of Moosinning was established by the Bavarian Municipal Edict, initially including the parts of Burgholz, Eching, Eder a.Holz, Kempfing, Riexing, Schnabelmoos, Sollnberg, Stammham, and Schweinham (last mentioned in 1867, now part of Moosinning). Ecclesiastically, Moosinning was still a branch of the parish of Aufkirchen, served by a cooperator residing in Aufkirchen. In 1877, the Moosinning expository was founded, which was elevated to the parish of St. Emmeram in 1883.

With the peat railway to Ismaning built by Egon von Poschinger in 1896, peat cutters settled in the moor, leading to the establishment of Zengermoos and Moosinninger Moos. In 1922, the area of Moosinninger Moos was renamed Eichenried. On July 1, 1960, Eichenried became the seat of its own parish.

=== Population development ===
According to the Bavarian State Office for Statistics, the population figures as of December 31 for each year have developed as follows:

Year	Population	Year	Population	Year	Population
1960	2,434	2006	5,269	2013	5,507
1970	2,947	2007	5,316	2014	5,555
1980	3,457	2008	5,381	2015	5,648
1990	3,776	2009	5,477	2016	5,700
1995	4,178	2010	5,521	2017	6,088
2000	4,804	2011	5,407	2018	6,157
2005	5,260	2012	5,444		

Since 1972, the year of the municipal reform, the population has increased by 2,699 people by 2018. This corresponds to a growth of 78.05%. Over the last five years, the population grew by 7.02%.

Between 1988 and 2018, the municipality grew from 3,647 to 5,908 inhabitants, an increase of 2,261 people or 62%.

In 2018, the population distribution was 3,135 male (50.92%) and 3,022 female (49.08%), with 1,164 (18.91%) being minors under 18 years of age.

== Politics ==
=== Municipal council ===
The municipal election held on March 15, 2020, yielded the following results and subsequent seat distribution in the municipal council:

Party / List	Vote share	Seats
CSU	32.32%	7
SPD	25.58%	5
Bürgerschaft Eichenried (Citizens' Association Eichenried)	19.04%	4
Bürgerblock Moosinning (Citizens' Block Moosinning)	16.24%	3
AfD	6.82%	1

Voter turnout was 67.05%.

=== Mayor ===
The current mayors are:

- First Mayor: Georg Nagler (SPD). In the 2020 municipal election, he received 56.74% of the valid votes.
- Second Mayor: Werner Fleischer (Bürgerschaft Eichenried)
- Third Mayor: Andreas Wachinger (CSU)

== Sights ==
- Catholic Parish Church St. Emmeram in Moosinning
- Filial Church in Kempfing

== Economy and infrastructure ==
=== Economy, including agriculture and forestry ===
In 1998, according to official statistics, there were ten persons employed subject to social insurance in the sector of agriculture and forestry, 182 in the producing sector, and 112 in the trade and transport sector at the place of work. In other economic sectors, 142 people were employed subject to social insurance at the place of work. There were 1,639 persons employed subject to social insurance at their place of residence. In the manufacturing sector, there were five businesses, and in the main construction sector, there were 13 businesses. Furthermore, in 1999, there were 97 agricultural holdings with a total agricultural area of 2,977 hectares, of which 2,634 hectares were arable land.

In 2017, according to official statistics, there were 27 persons employed subject to social insurance in agriculture and forestry, 383 in the producing sector, 249 in trade and transport, 91 in business services, and 172 in public and private services at the place of work. There were 2,699 persons employed subject to social insurance at their place of residence.

=== Transport ===
Local public transport is provided by the MVV bus line 531: Erding S–Moosinning–Eichenried–Ismaning S. Evening and weekend services are provided by the MVV call-taxi (RufTaxi) 5680: Erding–Finsing–Moosinning–München Schwaben.

=== Sports clubs ===
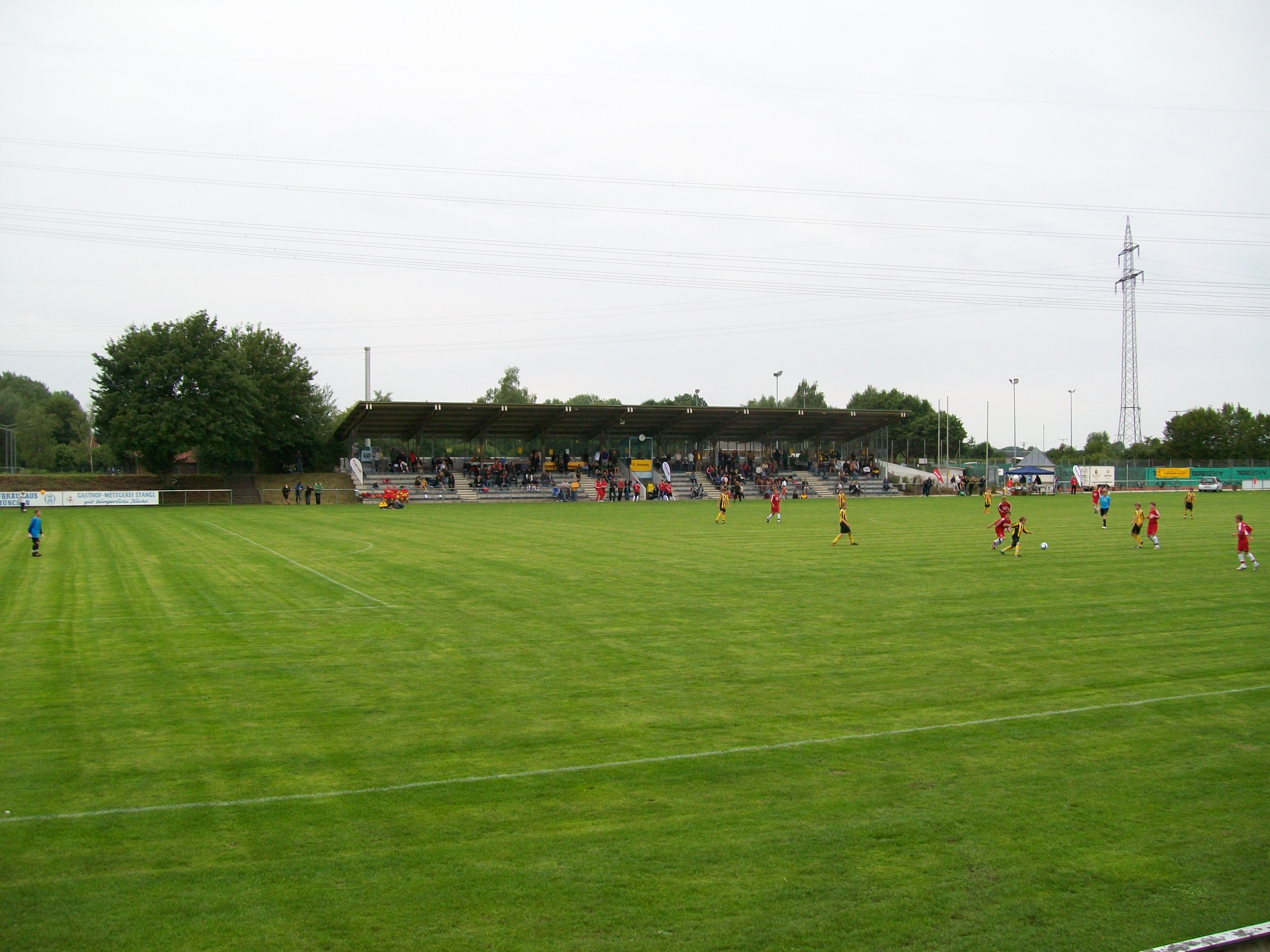
The sports ground during a youth football tournament in June 2011

Moosinning boasts one of the largest sports facilities in the district of Erding with its Sport- und Freizeitgelände (Sports and Leisure Grounds) on Fichtenstraße. The covered stand offers seating for around 500 spectators, with additional standing room available along the sides of the pitch. The football team FC Moosinning, which plays in the Fußball-Landesliga, holds its home matches here. In the 2018/19 season, FC Moosinning (Landesliga Südost) was the highest-ranked club in the district of Erding.

Other clubs include the Tennisclub Moosinning-Eichenried TCME e. V., SV Eichenried, and the GolfClub München Eichenried.

=== Education ===
==== Childcare ====
The municipality offers four childcare facilities: Kindergarten St. Joseph, Kinderhaus St. Emmeram, the AWO-Kinderhaus Am Fehlbach, and the AWO-Kinderkrippe Buntstiftbande.

==== Schools ====
In the 2018/2019 school year, 195 pupils were taught in nine classes by nine teachers at the Moosinning Primary School (Grundschule). The staff also included six specialist teachers and one administrative employee. After-school care (Mittagsbetreuung) is available. The school building also houses the municipal library.
