= Hassan Zahran =

Emirati footballer (born 1985)

Personal information
- Full name: Hassan zahran
- Date of birth: 7 June 1985 (age 41)
- Place of birth: United Arab Emirates
- Height: 1.93 m (6 ft 4 in)
- Position: Defender

Youth career
- Baniyas

Senior career*
Years	Team	Apps	(Gls)
2006–2011	Baniyas		
2011–2014	Al Dhafra	26	(2)
2014–2017	Al-Wasl	37	(0)
2017–2021	Ajman Club	49	(3)
- * Club domestic league appearances and goals

Hassan Zahran (Arabic:حسن زهران) (born 7 June 1985) is an Emirati footballer. He currently plays as a defender.
