= Abdullah Suhail =

Emirati footballer (born 1982)

Personal information
- Full name: Abdullah Suhail Abdullah al-Musharrekh al-Maazmi
- Date of birth: 22 January 1979 (age 47)
- Place of birth: Sharjah, United Arab Emirates
- Height: 1.69 m (5 ft 7 in)
- Position: Left-back

Youth career
- Al-Sharjah

Senior career*
Years	Team	Apps	(Gls)
1999–2010	Al-Sharjah		
2010	Al-Shabab		
2010–2011	Al-Ahli		

International career
2002–2006	United Arab Emirates		
- * Club domestic league appearances and goals

Abdullah Suhail (Arabic: عَبْدُ اللهِ سُهَيْلُ عَبْدُ اللهِ الْمُشَرَّخُ الْمَازِمِيُّ; born 22 January 1979) is an Emirati former professional footballer. A left-back position, he was also deployed as a central defender. His strengths are his speed, which makes any counterattack dangerous, and his dribbling skill. He was one of the main first team players in Sharjah.
