= Mahir Jasem =

Emirati footballer (born 1989)

Personal information
- Full name: Maher Jasem Ghuloom Abdulla Al-Haffar
- Date of birth: 22 January 1989 (age 37)
- Place of birth: Dubai, United Arab Emirates
- Height: 1.77 m (5 ft 10 in)
- Position: Winger

Senior career*
Years	Team	Apps	(Gls)
2008–2014	Al Wasl	54	(12)
2014–2016	Al Shaab	16	(2)
2016–2020	Hatta	63	(8)
2020–2021	Al Hamriyah		
2021–2022	Al Dhaid		
2023–2024	Gulf United		
2024–2025	Fleetwood United		

International career^{‡}
2006–2009	UAE under-17	21	(3)
2010–2011	UAE under-20	25	(8)
2011–	UAE	7	(1)
- * Club domestic league appearances and goals as of 23 February 2011 (UTC) ‡ National team caps and goals as of 23 February 2011 (UTC)

Mahir Jasem Ghuloom Abdulla Al-Haffar (Arabic: ماهر جاسم; born 22 January 1989) is an Emirati footballer who plays as a winger former the United Arab Emirates national team.

Maher was one of the youngsters nicknamed "The Dream Team" by AlWasl Club's fans as they were able to win each League competition they participated throughout their youth competition years.
