= Mohammed Jamal (footballer, born 1989) =

Emirati footballer

Personal information
- Full name: Mohammed Jamal Atiq Farhan Al-Falasi
- Date of birth: 22 July 1989 (age 37)
- Place of birth: United Arab Emirates
- Height: 1.81 m (5 ft 11 1/2 in)
- Position: Midfielder

Youth career
- Al-Wasl

Senior career*
Years	Team	Apps	(Gls)
2009–2016	Al-Wasl		
2016–2020	Hatta		
2020	→ Emirates (loan)		
2020–2021	Emirates		
2021–2022	Al Dhaid		
2022–2023	Gulf FC		
2023–2024	Gulf United		
- * Club domestic league appearances and goals

Mohammed Jamal Atiq Farhan Al-Falasi (Arabic:محمد جمال; born 22 July 1989) is an Emirati footballer who plays as a midfielder.
