= Khalid Darwish =

Emirati footballer (born 1979)

Khaled Darwish
Personal information
- Full name: Khalid Darwish Hassan Al-Balooshi
- Date of birth: 17 October 1979 (age 47)
- Place of birth: Dubai, UAE
- Height: 1.64 m (5 ft 5 in)
- Position: Midfielder

Senior career*
Years	Team	Apps	(Gls)
1998–2011	Al Wasl FC		
2009	→ Al Shabab (loan)		
2011–2013	Emirates Club	4	(0)

International career^{‡}
2001, 2006–2007	UAE	12	(0)
- * Club domestic league appearances and goals as of 12 December 2011 ‡ National team caps and goals as of 3 August 2010

Khalid Darwish (Arabic: خالد درويش; born 17 October 1979) is an Emirati footballer. He currently plays for Emirates Club. He is known for his ball controlling skills and excellent passing. He is sometimes nicknamed "Khalidona" after the famous football legend Maradona. The nickname is also a result of being the shortest player in the UAE Football League.

Darwish has played in Al Wasl FC since his childhood, throughout the different age group teams. He was loaned to Al Shabab Club during the 2009 Winter Transfer Window, but was brought back to Al Wasl the following summer.

Darwish left Al Wasl FC for Emirates Club on 17 September 2011.
