= Alex de Souza (footballer, born 1991) =

Brazilian footballer

Personal information
- Full name: Alex Pires de Souza
- Date of birth: January 8, 1991 (age 35)
- Place of birth: Ijaci, Brazil
- Height: 1.91 m (6 ft 3 in)
- Position: Forward

Youth career
- 2008: Fluminense U-20
- 2009: Internacional U-20

Senior career*
Years	Team	Apps	(Gls)
2010–2011	Fluminense		
2011	Al Wasl	1	(0)
2011–2012	Santa Cruz	0	(0)
Unknown	Baré Esporte Clube		
2018–	Kochi United SC	(2)	(1)
- * Club domestic league appearances and goals as of December 14, 2011 (UTC)

Alex Pires de Souza (born January 8, 1991), is a Brazilian footballer who played for Al Wasl FC in the United Arab Emirates, as well as other teams in Brazil. He now plays for Kochi United SC in the Japanese Shikoku Soccer League.
