= Zeka Goore =

Ivorian footballer

Personal information
- Full name: Zeka Goore
- Date of birth: 15 March 1984 (age 42)
- Place of birth: Abidjan, Ivory Coast
- Height: 1.89 m (6 ft 2 1/2 in)
- Position: Forward

Team information
- Current team: Eastern Company

Senior career*
Years	Team	Apps	(Gls)
2006–2008	Petrojet	27	(5)
2008–2009	Al Wasl		
2009–2010	ENPPI	9	(5)
2011	Telephonat		
2012–	Eastern Company		
- * Club domestic league appearances and goals

Zeka Goore (born 15 March 1984 in Abidjan) is an Ivorian footballer who currently plays for Egyptian club Eastern Company.
