= Pinga (footballer, born 1981) =

Brazilian footballer

Personal information
- Full name: André Luciano da Silva
- Date of birth: 27 April 1981 (age 45)
- Place of birth: Aracati, Brazil
- Height: 1.69 m (5 ft 7 in)
- Position: Attacking midfielder

Youth career
- 1995–1996: Ceará

Senior career*
Years	Team	Apps	(Gls)
1997	Ceará	11	(3)
1998	Vitória	20	(7)
1999	Juventus-SP	17	(5)
1999–2005	Torino	111	(18)
2001–2003	→ Siena (loan)	54	(11)
2005–2006	Treviso	24	(3)
2006–2007	Internacional	31	(2)
2008–2010	Al-Wahda	45	(28)
2010–2011	Al-Ahli	21	(11)
2011–2012	Al-Dhafra		
2013	Santos	0	(0)
2014	América-MG	0	(0)
- * Club domestic league appearances and goals

André Luciano da Silva (born 27 April 1981), commonly known as Pinga, is a Brazilian former professional footballer who played as an attacking midfielder.

== Career ==
Pinga was born in Aracati. He scored 14 goals in 34 games for Al Ahli in the 2010–11 UAE Pro-League campaign. On 2 January 2013, he signed a contract with Brazilian side Santos until May.
