= Ricardo Oliveira =

Brazilian footballer (born 1980)

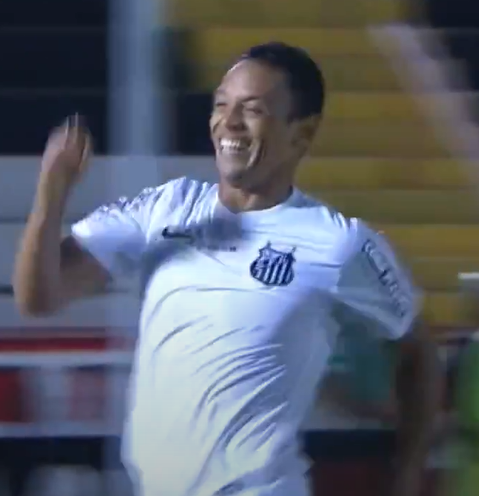
- Oliveira celebrating a goal with Santos in 2015

Personal information
- Full name: Ricardo José Dognella Lima de Oliveira
- Date of birth: 6 May 1980 (age 46)
- Place of birth: São Paulo, Brazil
- Height: 1.83 m (6 ft 0 in)
- Position: Striker

Youth career
- 1997–1999: Corinthians
- 1999–2000: Portuguesa

Senior career*
Years	Team	Apps	(Gls)
2000–2002	Portuguesa	56	(28)
2003	Santos	20	(11)
2003–2004	Valencia	21	(8)
2004–2006	Betis	46	(26)
2006	→ São Paulo (loan)	8	(5)
2006–2008	AC Milan	26	(3)
2007–2008	→ Zaragoza (loan)	37	(18)
2008–2009	Zaragoza	18	(9)
2009	Betis	16	(6)
2009–2014	Al Jazira	78	(54)
2010	→ São Paulo (loan)	15	(7)
2014	Al Wasl	11	(4)
2015–2017	Santos	114	(58)
2018–2020	Atlético Mineiro	83	(28)
2020–2021	Coritiba	18	(2)
2022	Athletic-MG	9	(1)
2023	Brasília	7	(2)
Total		579	(269)

International career
2004–2016	Brazil	16	(5)
- * Club domestic league appearances and goals

Ricardo José Dognella Lima de Oliveira (Brazilian Portuguese pronunciation: [ʁiˈkaʁdu oliˈvejɾɐ]; born 6 May 1980) is a Brazilian former professional footballer who played as a striker.

Oliveira represented São Paulo and Santos in two different spells, but also played in Spain, amassing La Liga totals of 120 games and 58 goals for three teams. A Brazil international from 2004 to 2016, he helped the national team win one Copa América and one Confederations Cup.

== Club career ==
=== Portuguesa ===
Born in São Paulo, Oliveira joined Corinthians' youth setup in 1997. After being released by the club in 1999, he moved to Portuguesa, being promoted to the first team in the following year.

Oliveira made his professional debut on 24 September 2000, coming on as a second-half substitute and scoring the game's only in a Copa João Havelange home win against Sport Club do Recife. He scored 23 goals over the course of three seasons in the Série A and, in March 2001, equalled a club record by netting in seven consecutive matches.

=== Santos ===
In early 2003, Oliveira moved to Santos, although this was disputed in a sports court. He scored in the group and knockout stages of the 2003 Copa Libertadores, and he appeared in both legs of the final, although his team lost to Boca Juniors.

=== Valencia ===
On 31 July 2003, Oliveira moved to Spain and joined Valencia CF, signing a five-year contract with Santos retaining part-ownership. Under the guidance of Rafael Benítez he scored eight La Liga goals in 21 games, including a fantastic long-range effort at FC Barcelona in a 1–0 win in October, netting a hat-trick the following month at RCD Mallorca (5–0 victory).

The Che were eventually crowned national champions, adding that season's UEFA Cup.

=== Betis ===
After one season, Oliveira joined Real Betis for a reported fee of €4 million. He scored a career-best 22 league goals in 37 appearances as the club reached the UEFA Champions League for the first time ever after finishing fourth, and also won the season's Copa del Rey against CA Osasuna, with the player netting the first in a 2–1 extra time win.

Oliveira scored his first official Champions League goal on 28 September 2005 at R.S.C. Anderlecht, following a brace – including a solo effort – against AS Monaco in the third qualifying round. Due to knee ligament damage sustained against Chelsea on 1 November 2005, he only played nine times in the league, although he netted four times.

Oliveira moved on loan to São Paulo in early 2006, in a bid to gain a place in Brazil's 2006 World Cup squad – prolonged recovery time meant he never made it but he did continue to compete for the club in all the fronts until 10 August 2006. Previously, in August 2005, he had threatened with leaving the Verdiblancos over economic issues.

Oliveira returned to Betis on 21 August following his loan spell, nine days later than he was requested, which caused controversy among the club's board of directors. The delay was caused by an unplanned schedule change made by CONMEBOL, which postponed the Libertadores final match in one week, and his contract was due on the day after the previous final match date; he wanted to play on the decisive match and tried to reach an agreement with the Andalusians, even with a special allowance from FIFA, but the Spanish team would not cooperate and he was not able to take part in the game.

=== AC Milan ===
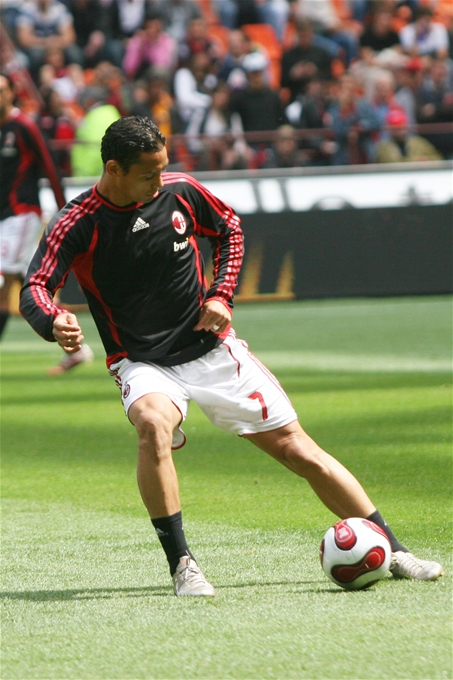
Oliveira training with AC Milan in 2007

The Serie A giants had just lost Andriy Shevchenko after the 2006 Italian football scandal, and signed Oliveira as his replacement on 31 August 2006, to a five-year deal. Johann Vogel moved in the opposite position as part of the deal after the two clubs negotiated nearly a week over the transfer fee, which reportedly reached €17.5 million.

Oliveira made his debut in the second half of the 2006–07 opening-day match against S.S. Lazio, heading past Angelo Peruzzi from the goalline in a 2–1 home win. He scored twice more after that for the Rossoneri in the league, adding two more in their run in the Coppa Italia; he spent most of the season under the stress of the October 2006 kidnapping of his sister, Maria Lourdes, who was released unharmed on 12 March 2007.

=== Zaragoza ===
On 14 July 2007, Oliveira moved back to Spain and joined Real Zaragoza on loan, forming an impressive striker partnership with Argentine Diego Milito as the two scored 33 of the side's 50 goals during the campaign, which nonetheless ended in relegation. The Aragonese would have an option to purchase him for an agreed price when the loan period finished.

On 25 May 2008, Zaragoza bought Oliveira from Milan for a reported €10 million.

=== Betis return ===
In late January 2009 Oliveira re-joined Betis on a fee of €8.9 million with commission, signing until June 2013. He scored in the 83rd minute of his very first appearance, netting the second goal in the derby against Sevilla FC on 7 February, a 2–1 win at the Ramón Sánchez Pizjuán Stadium.

Betis would be eventually relegated, as both Oliveira (who struck in the last match, a 1–1 home draw with Real Valladolid) and former Zaragoza teammate Sergio García met the same fate for the second consecutive year.

=== Al-Jazira ===
In mid-July 2009 Oliveira, already immersed in pre-season with Betis, left for Al Jazira Club in a lucrative deal of about €14 million. In January of the following year, he returned to his country and São Paulo on loan.

In Al Jazira's opening match of the 2012 AFC Champions League, Oliveira scored his side's last goal in a 4–2 defeat of FC Nasaf on 7 March 2012, netting three against the same opponent on 2 May (4–1 victory). Two weeks later, he scored all of his team's goals against Al-Rayyan SC in a 4–3 win at the Ahmed Bin Ali Stadium in Doha.

In the competition's round of 16 clash against Al-Ahli, Oliveira netted twice in a 3–3 draw, but missed his shootout attempt to see his team be eliminated 2–4. In late January 2014, following the arrivals of Felipe Caicedo and Jucilei, he was released.

=== Return to Santos ===
On 12 January 2015, Oliveira returned to Santos after agreeing to a five-month deal. He played his first match after his return on 1 February, coming on as a second-half substitute for Geuvânio in a 3–0 home win over Ituano.

On 1 May 2015, after being the club's top goalscorer in that year's Campeonato Paulista – also being elected the best player of the competition – Oliveira extended his contract until December 2017. In the subsequent Brasileirão, he also scored braces against his former club São Paulo (2–3 away defeat) and Chapecoense (3–1 home win), again leading the charts with 20 goals.

Oliveira scored the decisive goal in 2016 Campeonato Paulista final against Audax on 8 May. He later revealed playing the match with a knee injury, which subsequently kept him sidelined for two months. On 27 July, he netted a hat-trick in a 3–0 home win over Gama for the Copa do Brasil.

After a 2017 campaign marked by injuries, Oliveira still managed to score nine times in the league as his side finished third. On 20 December, after failing to agree new terms, he left the club.

=== Atlético Mineiro ===
A day after announcing his departure from Santos, 37-year-old Oliveira agreed to a two-year deal with fellow league team Atlético Mineiro. In September 2020, he officially left the club after alleging unpaid wages and leaving back in June.

=== Coritiba ===
On 29 September 2020, aged 40, Oliveira was announced at Coritiba still in the top tier. On 28 May 2021, after spending three months without playing, he left the club.

=== Later career ===
On 24 January 2022, Oliveira was announced at São Caetano, but left the club ten days later after having disagreements with the club's board when signing his contract. On 5 February, he signed for Athletic-MG.

Oliveira left Athletic on 5 April 2022, after helping the club to win the Campeonato Mineiro do Interior title. He stayed without a club for the remainder of the year, before being announced at Brasília on 2 January 2023.

Oliveira departed Brasília on 15 March 2023, after just seven matches. He announced his retirement from professional football on 28 July, during an interview to portal ge.

== International career ==
Oliveira made his debut for the Brazil national team against the Catalan XI on 25 May 2004, scoring in a 5–1 win. The game was not considered an official friendly match by FIFA.

He was subsequently included in the squad for the 2004 Copa América, winning his first cap on 8 July 2004 against Paraguay. During the event he also scored his first international goal, in the quarter-final match against Mexico on the 18th, as Brazil went on to win the cup.

Subsequently, Oliveira became a regular as a cover for Adriano, Robinho and Ronaldo. He was also included in the squad for the 2005 FIFA Confederations Cup, only missing out on the 2006 FIFA World Cup due to injury with Betis.

After a one-year absence from the national team, new national coach Dunga recalled Oliveira for a friendly match with Switzerland on 15 November 2006. On 24 September 2015, exactly 15 years after his professional debut and eight after his last cap, he was called up as a replacement to injured Roberto Firmino for the first two matches of the 2018 World Cup qualification campaign against Chile and Venezuela, starting in the latter and scoring his side's last in a 3–1 win in Fortaleza.

Oliveira scored again on 29 March 2016, netting his side's first in a 2–2 2018 World Cup qualification draw with Paraguay. On 5 May he was named among the 23-man list for the Copa América Centenario to be held in the United States, but was replaced by Jonas on 21 May due to injury.

== Career statistics ==
=== Club ===
Appearances and goals by club, season and competition
Club	Season	League			National cup (Note: Includes Copa do Brasil, Copa del Rey, Coppa Italia)		Continental		State league (Note: Includes Campeonato Paulista, Campeonato Mineiro, Campeonato Brasiliense)		Other		Total	
Club	Season	Division	Apps	Goals	Apps	Goals	Apps	Goals	Apps	Goals	Apps	Goals	Apps	Goals
Portuguesa	2000	Série A	5	1	—		—		—		—		5	1
Portuguesa	2001	Série A	24	14	6	5	—		10	5	—		40	24
Portuguesa	2002	Série A	17	8	5	4	—		—		15 (Note: Appearances in Torneio Rio–São Paulo)	12	37	24
Portuguesa	Total		46	23	11	9	—		10	5	15	12	82	49
Santos	2003	Série A	14	4	—		11 (Note: Appearances in Copa Libertadores)	9	6	7	—		31	20
Valencia	2003–04	La Liga	21	8	3	0	6 (Note: Appearances in UEFA Cup)	1	—		—		30	9
Betis	2004–05	La Liga	37	22	8	4	—		—		—		45	26
Betis	2005–06	La Liga	9	4	—		5 (Note: Appearances in UEFA Champions League)	3	—		1 (Note: Appearance in Supercopa de España)	0	15	7
Betis	Total		46	26	8	4	5	3	—		1	0	60	33
São Paulo	2006	Série A	8	5	—		4	2	—		—		12	7
AC Milan	2006–07	Serie A	26	3	5	2	6	0	—		—		37	5
Zaragoza	2007–08	La Liga	37	18	4	3	2	1	—		—		43	22
Zaragoza	2008–09	Segunda División	18	9	0	0	—		—		—		18	9
Zaragoza	Total		55	27	4	3	2	1	—		—		61	31
Betis	2008–09	La Liga	16	6	—		—		—		—		16	6
Al Jazira	2009–10	UAE Pro League	13	8	—		0	0	—		—		13	8
Al Jazira	2010–11	UAE Pro League	11	10	—		3 (Note: Appearances in AFC Champions League)	1	—		—		14	11
Al Jazira	2011–12	UAE Pro League	20	14	9	7	7	12	—		1 (Note: Appearance in UAE Super Cup)	0	37	33
Al Jazira	2012–13	UAE Pro League	22	17	10	11	5	1	—		1	0	38	29
Al Jazira	2013–14	UAE Pro League	12	5	5	6	—		—		—		17	11
Al Jazira	Total		78	54	24	24	15	14	—		2	0	119	92
São Paulo	2010	Série A	15	7	—		2	1	—		—		17	8
Al Wasl	2013–14	UAE Pro League	11	4	1	0	—		—		—		12	4
Santos	2015	Série A	32	20	12	6	—		18	11	—		62	37
Santos	2016	Série A	20	11	3	4	—		15	7	—		38	22
Santos	2017	Série A	23	8	3	0	8	3	6	1	—		40	12
Santos	Total		75	39	18	10	8	3	39	19	—		140	71
Atlético Mineiro	2018	Série A	35	13	7	3	1 (Note: Appearance(s) in Copa Sudamericana)	0	13	6	—		56	22
Atlético Mineiro	2019	Série A	21	2	3	0	14 (Note: Nine appearances and five goals in Copa Libertadores, five appearances in Copa Sudamericana)	5	8	7	—		46	14
Atlético Mineiro	2020	Série A	0	0	1	1	1	0	6	0	—		8	1
Atlético Mineiro	Total		56	15	11	4	16	5	27	13	—		110	37
Coritiba	2020	Série A	18	2	—		—		—		—		18	2
Athletic-MG	2022	Mineiro	—		—		—		9	1	—		9	1
Brasília	2023	Brasiliense	—		—		—		7	2	—		7	2
Career total			481	222	85	56	75	39	98	47	18	12	758	376

=== International ===
Appearances and goals by national team and year
National team	Year	Apps	Goals
Brazil	2004	3	1
Brazil	2005	6	2
Brazil	2006	1	0
Brazil	2007	1	0
Brazil	2015	3	1
Brazil	2016	2	1
Total		16	5

Scores and results list Brazil's goal tally first, score column indicates score after each Oliveira goal.

List of international goals scored by Ricardo Oliveira
No.	Date	Venue	Opponent	Score	Result	Competition
1	18 July 2004	Miguel Grau, Piura, Peru	Mexico	4–0	4–0	2004 Copa América
2	9 February 2005	Hong Kong Stadium, So Kon Po, Hong Kong	Hong Kong	3–0	7–1	Friendly
3	9 February 2005	Hong Kong Stadium, So Kon Po, Hong Kong	Hong Kong	5–0	7–1	Friendly
4	13 October 2015	Castelão, Fortaleza, Brazil	Venezuela	3–1	3–1	2018 FIFA World Cup qualification
5	29 March 2016	Defensores del Chaco, Asunción, Paraguay	Paraguay	2–2	2–2	2018 FIFA World Cup qualification

== Honours ==
Valencia

- La Liga: 2003–04
- UEFA Cup: 2003–04

Betis

- Copa del Rey: 2004–05

São Paulo

- Campeonato Brasileiro Série A: 2006

AC Milan

- UEFA Champions League: 2006–07

Al Jazira

- UAE Pro League: 2010–11
- UAE President's Cup: 2010–11, 2011–12
- UAE League Cup: 2009–10

Santos

- Campeonato Paulista: 2015, 2016

Brazil

- Copa América: 2004
- FIFA Confederations Cup: 2005

Individual

- Campeonato Paulista Team of the Year: 2015
- Campeonato Paulista Best Player: 2015
- Chuteira de Ouro: 2015
- Campeonato Brasileiro Série A Team of the Year: 2015
- Campeonato Brasileiro Série A Top scorer: 2015
- Best Forward in Brazil: 2015, 2016

== See also ==
- Fastest goals in association football
