= Khalifa Abdullah =

Emirati footballer (born 1991)

Khalifa Abdulla
Personal information
- Full name: Khalifa Abdullah Mohammed Al-Bloushi
- Date of birth: 20 February 1991 (age 35)
- Place of birth: Sharjah, United Arab Emirates
- Height: 1.81 m (5 ft 11 in)
- Position: Midfielder

Team information
- Current team: Al Dhaid
- Number: 92

Senior career*
Years	Team	Apps	(Gls)
2010–2015	Al Wasl	53	(5)
2015–2017	Al Shabab	30	(0)
2017–2018	Ajman	8	(0)
2020–2022	Al-Arabi		
2022–2024	Emirates		
2024–	Al Dhaid		
- * Club domestic league appearances and goals

Khalifa Abdullah (Arabic: خليفة عبد الله; born 20 February 1991) is an Emirati footballer who plays for Al Dhaid as a midfielder.
