= Yousif Hassan =

Emirati footballer

Yousif Hassan (Arabic: يوسف حسن) is a UAE footballer. He currently plays as a midfielder for the Al Wasl FC Club in Dubai.

Hassan was transferred to Al Wasl FC from Al-Shaab (UAE) in summer 2008. And in Winter 2010, he was loaned back to Al Shaab

In the 2010/11 season, Yousif was loaned again by Al Wasl but this time to Ajman Club.
