= Jumaa Abdullah =

Emirati footballer (born 1982)

Personal information
- Full name: Jumaa Abdullah Al Jabri
- Date of birth: 11 March 1982 (age 44)
- Place of birth: United Arab Emirates
- Height: 1.86 m (6 ft 1 in)
- Position: Defender

Youth career
- Al Ain

Senior career*
Years	Team	Apps	(Gls)
2004–2009	Al Ain		
2009	→ Al Wasl (loan)		
2009–2015	Al Jazira		
2015–2016	Al Dhafra		
2016–2017	Al Urooba		
- * Club domestic league appearances and goals

Jumaa Abdullah (Arabic: جمعة عبد الله; born 11 March 1982) is an Emirati footballer.
