= Grégory Dufrennes =

French footballer (born 1983)

Personal information
- Date of birth: 15 March 1983 (age 43)
- Place of birth: Les Ulis, Paris, France
- Height: 1.73 m (5 ft 8 in)
- Position: Attacking midfielder

Team information
- Current team: Al-Batin (manager)

Youth career
- 1991–1997: US Palaiseau
- 1997–1999: Cannes
- 1999–2000: US Palaiseau

Senior career*
Years	Team	Apps	(Gls)
2000–2003	Amiens	16	(0)
2003–2004	Valenciennes	12	(1)
2004–2006	FC Sète	82	(21)
2006–2007	Dubai	43	(41)
2007–2008	Al Ahli		(1)
2008–2009	FC Sète	25	(9)
2009–2013	Kalba	119	(76)
2013–2014	FC Sète	19	(6)
2014–2015	Dubai	20	(5)
2015	Al Khaleej	10	(3)

Managerial career
- 2021–2022: Al Wahda
- 2022–2023: Dibba Al Fujairah
- 2024: Al Jazira (caretaker)
- 2025: Al-Batin
- * Club domestic league appearances and goals

Grégory Dufrennes (Arabic: غريغوري دوفرينيس; born 15 March 1983) is a French former professional footballer, who played as an attacking midfielder.

== Career ==
Dufrennes played in Ligue 2 with Amiens SC and FC Sète 34.

On 3 August 2025, Dufrennes was appointed of Saudi First Division League club Al-Batin. He left the club on 27 November 2025.

== Managerial statistics ==
As of match played 25 December 2022

Team	Nat	From	To	Record							
Team	Nat	From	To	G	W	D	L	GF	GA	GD	Win %
Al Wahda	(United Arab Emirates)	25 October 2021	30 June 2022	29	18	5	6	53	32	+21	62.07
Dibba Al Fujairah	(United Arab Emirates)	8 October 2022	25 December 2022	10	1	0	9	3	21	−18	10.00
Al Jazira	(United Arab Emirates)	9 April 2024	2 June 2024	9	3	5	1	14	12	+2	33.33
Al-Batin	(Saudi Arabia)	3 August 2025	27 November 2025	10	1	2	7	15	24	−9	10.00
Total				58	23	12	23	85	89	−4	39.66

== Personal life ==
Dufrennes's father, Jean-Luc, is a retired professional footballer who played in Ligue 2 with Entente Viry-Châtillon. His brother, Franck, is an amateur footballer who played for Vannes OC.
