= Ahmed Jumaa =

Emirati association football player (born 1986)

Ahmed Jumaa أحمد جمعة
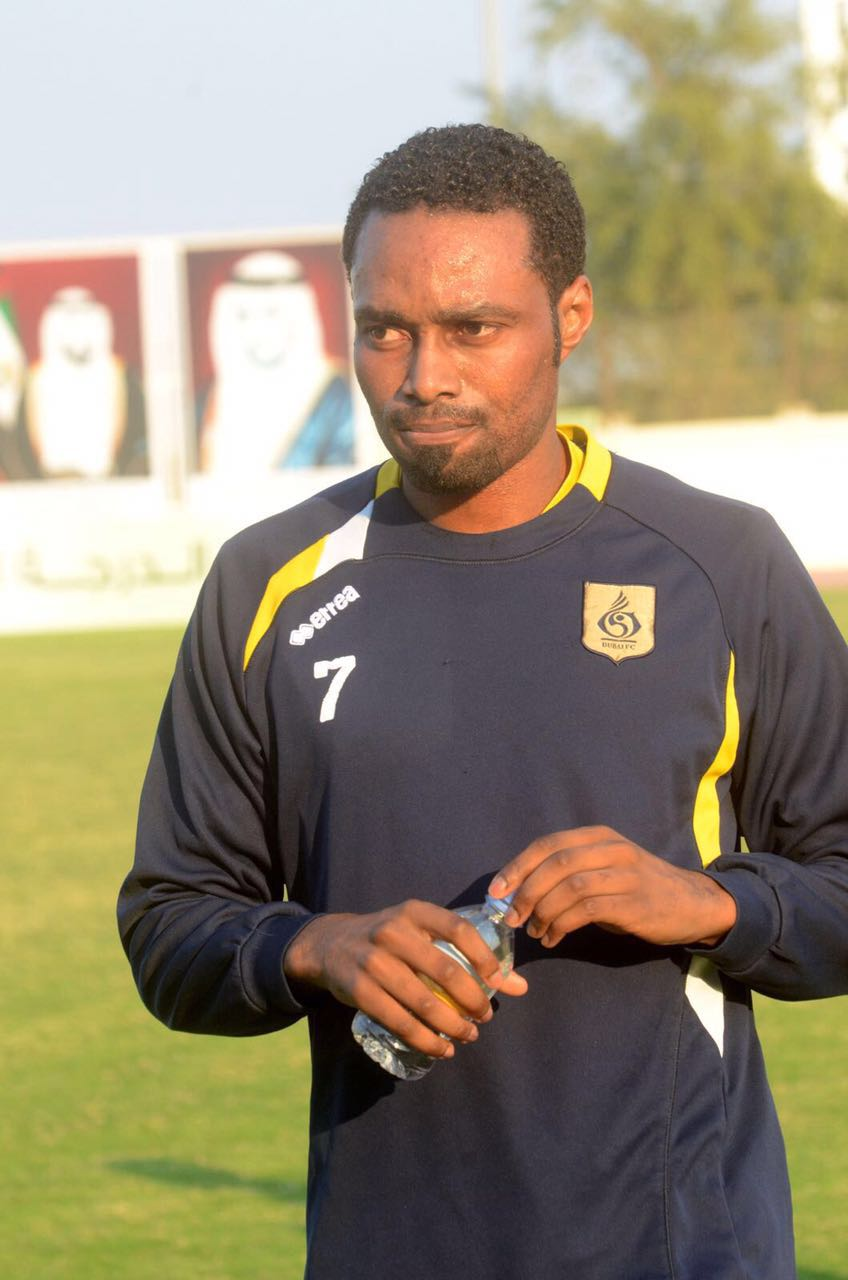

Personal information
- Full name: Ahmed Jumaa Anber Al-Junaibi
- Date of birth: 2 January 1986 (age 40)
- Place of birth: Abu Dhabi/Emirates
- Height: 1.70 m (5 ft 7 in)
- Position: Forward

Youth career
- Al-Wahda

Senior career*
Years	Team	Apps	(Gls)
2007–2013	Al-Jazira		
2013–2014	Al-Wasl		
2014–2015	Al-Shaab		
2015	Ittihad Kalba		
2015–2016	Dubai		
2016–2017	Al Urooba		
- * Club domestic league appearances and goals

Ahmed Jumaa (Arabic: أحمد جمعة; born 2 January 1986) is an Emirati former professional footballer who played as a forward.

== Career ==
He formerly played for Al-Wahda, Al-Jazira, Al-Wasl, Al-Shaab, Ittihad Kalba, Dubai, and Al Urooba.
