= Marcelinho (footballer, born September 1984) =

Brazilian footballer (born 1984)

Personal information
- Full name: Marcelo Oliveira da Silva
- Date of birth: 10 September 1984 (age 42)
- Height: 1.80 m (5 ft 11 in)
- Position: Striker

Senior career*
Years	Team	Apps	(Gls)
2004–2005	Atlético Mineiro	8	(0)
2005	Aalborg BK	3	(3)
2006–2007	Avaí	53	(16)
2007–2009	Naval 1º de Maio	26	(8)
2009–2012	Sharjah	50	(31)
2012–2013	Al-Wahda	23	(27)
2013	Fluminense	24	(9)
2013	Náutico	9	(1)
2014-2015	Malmö		
- * Club domestic league appearances and goals as of 10 June 2025

Marcelo Oliveira Silva known as Marcelinho (born 10 September 1984) is a retired Brazilian football player.
