= Alexandre Oliveira =

Brazilian footballer (born 1979)

Personal information
- Full name: Alexandre Aparecido de Oliveira
- Date of birth: 22 January 1979 (age 47)
- Place of birth: Ijaci, Brazil
- Height: 1.81 m (5 ft 11 in)
- Position: Attacking midfielder

Senior career*
Years	Team	Apps	(Gls)
2000–2002	Atlético-PR		
2002–2003	Paraná		
2003–2004	Guarani		
2004	Paraná		
2004	Londrina		
2004–2005	Iraty		
2005	Coritiba		
2005–2011	Al Wasl		
2011	Botafogo		
2012	Londrina		
2012	Atlético Goianiense		
2013–2014	Londrina		
- * Club domestic league appearances and goals

Alexandre Aparecido de Oliveira (born 22 January 1979) is a Brazilian former professional footballer.

Originally a winger with ability to play as an attacking midfielder, Oliveira was usually positioned by Al Wasl FC in the United Arab Emirates coaches as a second striker.

He returned to Brazil to play for Botafogo, ending a six-year tenure with Al Wasl. Botafogo announced that he had signed a contract with the club upon passing a medical on 29 June 2011.
