= Antonin Koutouan =

Ivorian footballer

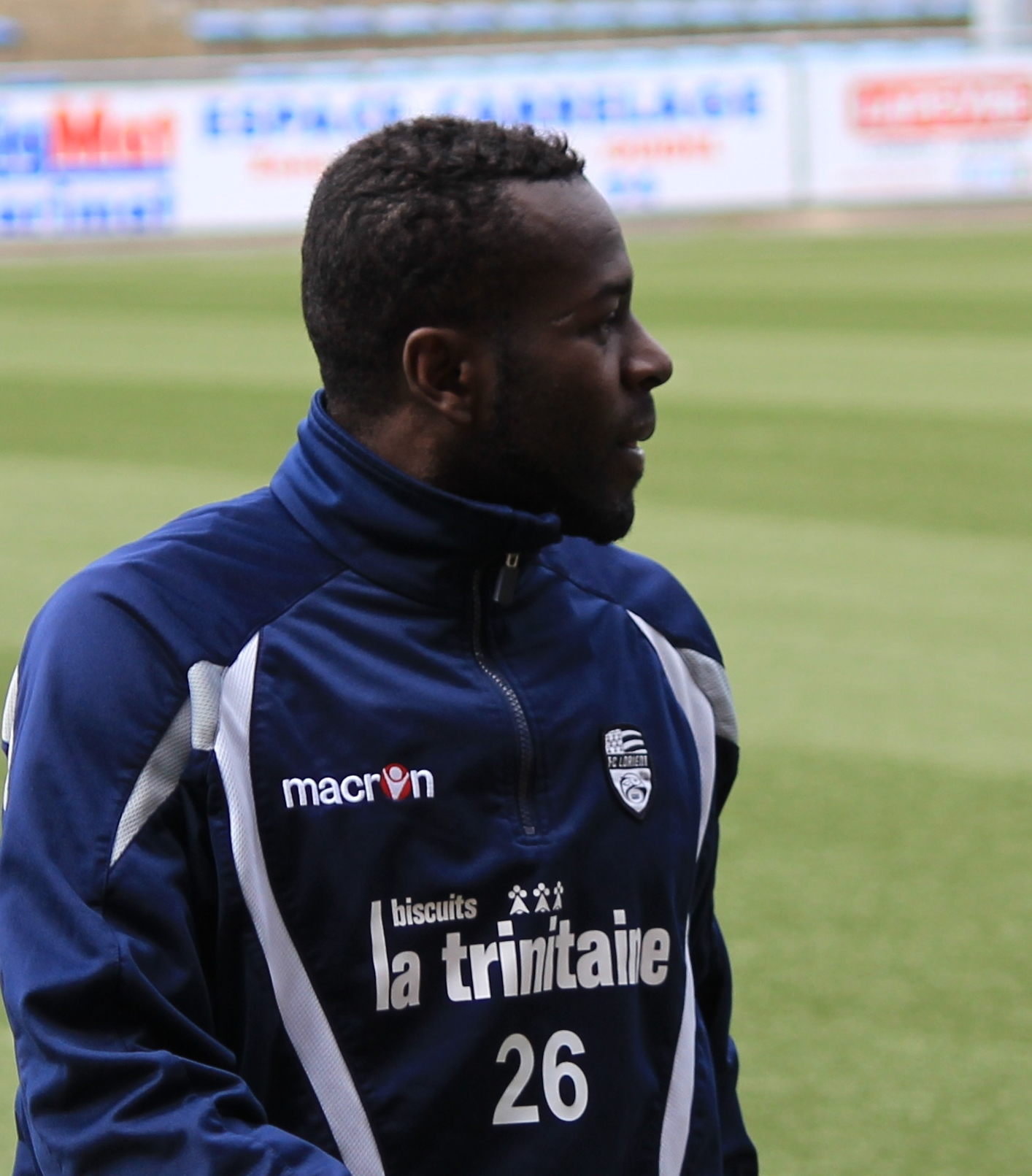
- Koutouan training with Lorient in 2013

Personal information
- Full name: Antonin Koutouan Nantcho
- Date of birth: 11 November 1983 (age 42)
- Place of birth: Abidjan, Ivory Coast
- Height: 1.69 m (5 ft 7 in)
- Position: Forward

Youth career
- –: ASEC Mimosas

Senior career*
Years	Team	Apps	(Gls)
1998–2002	ASEC Mimosas		
2002–2003	Beveren	0	(0)
2003–2005	Al-Wahda		
2003–2004	→ Lorient (loan)	25	(8)
2004–2005	→ Grenoble (loan)	9	(1)
2005–2010	Al-Jazira	81	(44)
2011	Al-Arabi SC (Qatar)	3	(0)
2011–2012	Bani Yas	8	(4)
2013	Lorient B	9	(0)

International career
2001	Ivory Coast	2	(0)
- * Club domestic league appearances and goals

Antonin Koutouan Nantcho, better known as Tony (born 11 November 1983) is an Ivorian former professional footballer who played as a forward.

== Club career ==
Born in Abidjan, Ivory Coast, Koutouan began his career at the ASEC Abidjan youth academy, before moving to Belgian club K.S.K. Beveren. He also played for FC Lorient and Grenoble Foot 38 in France. (Note: Antonin Koutouan – French league stats at LFP – also available in French (archived))
