= 2009–10 Al Wasl FC season =

Al Wasl FC
2009–10 season
- Manager: (Costa Rica) Alexandre Guimarães
- Stadium: Zabeel Stadium
- UAE League: 5th
- UAE President Cup: Round of 16
- Etisalat Emirates Cup: Group Stage
- Gulf Club Champions Cup 2010: Winners
- Top goalscorer: League: Saeed Al Kass (9); All: Saeed Al Kass (15)
Home colours	Away colours

== Squad ==
Note: Flags indicate national team as defined under FIFA eligibility rules; some limited exceptions apply. Players may hold more than one non-FIFA nationality.

No.	Pos.	Nation	Player
1	GK	UAE	Rashid AlSuwaidi
3	DF	UAE	Omran Abdul Rahman
4	DF	UAE	Isam Darweesh
5	DF	UAE	Sami Rubaiya
6	DF	UAE	Waheed Ismail
7	MF	UAE	Eissa Ali
8	DF	UAE	Ali Mahmoud
9	DF	UAE	Tariq Hassan
10	MF	UAE	Khalid Darwish (captain)
11	MF	BRA	Élton
13	DF	UAE	Darweesh Ahmad
14	DF	UAE	Khalaf Ismail
17	FW	BRA	Alexander Oliveira
20	MF	UAE	Fadel Ahmad
21	FW	UAE	Saeed Al Kass

No.	Pos.	Nation	Player
22	GK	UAE	Salah Hussein
23	MF	UAE	Mohammed Jamal
24	FW	UAE	Rashid Eissa
25	DF	OMA	Mohammed Al Balushi
26	MF	UAE	Humaid bin Lahej
29	DF	UAE	Yasser Salem
33	MF	UAE	Saud Suhail
55	GK	UAE	Majed Nasser
70	FW	UAE	Mahir Jasem
77	FW	UAE	Waleed Murad
80	MF	UAE	Yousuf Abdul Aziz
85	FW	MAR	Soufiane Alloudi
99	MF	UAE	Nabil Ibrahim

== Staff ==
- (Costa Rica) Alexandre Guimarães - Head Coach
- Rodríguez - Assistant Coach
- (United Arab Emirates) Humaid Yousuf - Team Manager
- (Brazil) Luiz Carlos - Fitness Coach
- (Algeria) Yassin Bentaalla - Goalkeepers Coach
- (Iraq) Dr. Taha Al Rawy - Team Doctor
- (Brazil) Leonardo Sasuque - Processor
- Joseph - Masseur

== Transfers ==
=== In ===
Name	Nat	Moving from	Fee
Coach Alexandre Guimarães	(Costa Rica)	Panama national football team	Undisclosed
Khalid Darwish	(United Arab Emirates)	(United Arab Emirates) Al-Shabab (UAE)	End of Loan
Khalaf Esmail	(United Arab Emirates)	(United Arab Emirates) Al-Shabab (UAE)	End of Loan
Isam Darweesh	(United Arab Emirates)	(United Arab Emirates) Al-Nasr Sports Club	Free
Fadel Ahmad	(United Arab Emirates)	(United Arab Emirates) Al Ain FC	Undisclosed
Ahmad Khalfan	(United Arab Emirates)	(United Arab Emirates) Al Ain FC	Loan
Blas Pérez	(Panama)	(Mexico) UANL Tigers	Undisclosed
Mohammed Al Balushi	(Oman)	(Qatar) Al-Arabi Sports Club	Loan
Darweesh Ahmed	(United Arab Emirates)	(United Arab Emirates) Al Ain FC	Undisclosed
Douglas dos Santos	(Brazil)	(Brazil) Club Corinthians	R$11M
Nabil Ibrahim	(United Arab Emirates)	(United Arab Emirates) Al-Shaab (UAE)	Loan
Soufiane Alloudi	(Morocco)	(United Arab Emirates) Al Ain Club	Loan
Élton	(Brazil)	(United Arab Emirates) Dubai Club	Loan

=== Out ===
Name	Nat	Moving To	Fee
Fabio Firmani	(Italy)	(Italy) S.S. Lazio	End of Loan
Eman Mobali	(Iran)	(United Arab Emirates) Al-Nasr Sports Club	Free
Habib AlFardan	(United Arab Emirates)	(United Arab Emirates) Al-Nasr Sports Club	Free
Juma Abdulla	(United Arab Emirates)	(United Arab Emirates) Al Ain FC	End of Loan
Ali Msarri	(United Arab Emirates)	(United Arab Emirates) Al Ain FC	End of Loan
Tareq Darwish	(United Arab Emirates)	(United Arab Emirates) Ajman Club	Free
Rogério Miranda Silva	(Brazil)	(Brazil) Fortaleza Esporte Clube	Loan
Abdulla Eissa	(United Arab Emirates)	(United Arab Emirates) Al-Shaab (UAE)	Free
Ahmad Salim (footballer)	(United Arab Emirates)	(United Arab Emirates) Al-Shaab (UAE)	Free
Blas Pérez	(Panama)	(Mexico) San Luis F.C.	Loan
Douglas dos Santos	(Brazil)	(Brazil) Grêmio	$6.5M
Yousif Hassan	(United Arab Emirates)	(United Arab Emirates) Al-Shaab (UAE)	Loan
Faisal Ahmed	(United Arab Emirates)	(United Arab Emirates) Al-Khaleej Club (Sharjah)	Loan
Faisal Salem	(United Arab Emirates)	(United Arab Emirates) Masafi Club	Loan
Radwan Saleh	(United Arab Emirates)	(United Arab Emirates) Al-Ahli Club (Fujairah)	Loan
Ahmad Khalfan	(United Arab Emirates)	(United Arab Emirates) Al Ain FC	End of Loan

For Last Season's Transfers List Please visit List of AlWasl football transfers 2008 2009

=== Players on loan ===
Note: Flags indicate national team as defined under FIFA eligibility rules; some limited exceptions apply. Players may hold more than one non-FIFA nationality.

No.	Pos.	Nation	Player
-	DF	UAE	Adel Mohammad (at Al Shabab Club)
-	MF	UAE	Talal Fahad (at Al Shabab Club)
-	MF	UAE	Jassim Mobarak (at Al Shabab Club)
11	MF	BRA	Rogerinho (at Fortaleza Esporte Clube)

== Tournaments ==
Match won	Match drawn	Match lost	Biggest win	Biggest loss

=== Gulf Club Champions Cup 2009 ===
The draw for the group stage of the Gulf Club Champions Cup 2009 was made on July 18, 2009 in Bahrain. AlWasl were drawn into Group D with the Kuwaiti team Kuwait SC, and the Bahraini side Riffa.

During the second leg match again Al-Nassr club of Saudi Arabia, few fans were provoked by Al Nassr's team doctor to break into the field and assault him. This incident has put Al Wasl's deserved qualification into the finals into jeopardy.

In the Final, Al Wasl played against Qatar SC and won the tournament based on the Away goals rule after drawing 2-2 in Qatar, then drawing 1-1 in Dubai.

Al Wasl FC Striker Saeed Al Kass won the Top Scorer title with 6 goals, and the Left winger Fadel Ahmad won the Best Player title.

==== Group D Standing ====
Team	Pld	W	D	L	GF	GA	GD	Pts
(United Arab Emirates) Al Wasl FC	4	2	2	0	5	3	+2	8
(Bahrain) Riffa	4	1	2	1	4	4	0	5
Kuwait SC	4	0	2	2	2	4	−2	2

==== Results ====
Kick Off	Opponents	V	Result	Scorers	Referee	Stage
2009-09-22 20:45	Kuwait SC	A	2 – 1	Saeed Al Kass 53', Douglas dos Santos 88'	(Qatar) Abdullah AlBolooshi	Groups Stage
2009-09-29 19:00	(Bahrain) Riffa Club	H	2 – 2	Blas Pérez 10' (pen), Saeed Al Kass 83'	(Oman) Abdullah AlHelali	Groups Stage
2009-11-20 19:00	(Bahrain) Riffa Club	A	1 – 0	Douglas dos Santos 64'	(Saudi Arabia) Dhafer AlShehri	Groups Stage
2009-12-16 16:45	Kuwait SC	H	0 – 0		(Oman) Abdullah AlHilali	Groups Stage
2010-03-25 21:30	(Saudi Arabia) Al-Nassr	A	1 – 3	Saeed Al Kass 30'	(Qatar) Abdullah AlBolooshi	Semi-finals - 1st Leg
2010-03-30 20:30	(Saudi Arabia) Al-Nassr	H	3 – 1, 1-1 (AET), 4-3 (P)	Saeed Al Kass 26', Soufiane Alloudi 49', Soufiane Alloudi 88', Saeed Al Kass 113', Eissa Ali (P), Mohammed Al Balushi (P), Soufiane Alloudi(P), Élton(P)	(Oman) Abdullah AlHilali	Semi-finals - 2nd Leg
2010-04-13 19:30	Qatar SC	A	2 – 2	Fadel Ahmad 5', Élton 56'	(Kuwait) Ali Mahmoud Shaban	Final - 1st Leg
2010-04-27 20:30	Qatar SC	H	1 – 1	Saeed Al Kass 57'	(Kuwait) Yousef Al Thowaini	Final - 2nd Leg

==== Top scorers ====
Player	Goals
(United Arab Emirates) Saeed Al Kass	6
(Brazil) Douglas dos Santos	2
(Morocco) Soufiane Alloudi	2
(Panama) Blas Pérez	1
(United Arab Emirates) Fadel Ahmad	1
(Brazil) Élton	1

=== UAE League 2009–10 ===
AlWasl started the League season with high hopes after the successful signings it made during summer. But the team's star, the Goalkeeper Majed Nasser risked the team's chances by getting suspension in the team's second match of the season against Al Shabab, forcing the team to play 5 matches without his very essential services. In the Winter transfer period, Al Wasl ended the contracts of his two new foreign players Blas Pérez and Douglas dos Santos due to their failure to secure a place in the team's squad. It signed the Moroccan player Soufiane Alloudi on a loan contract.

And on 18 February 2010, The team signed Brazilian playmaker Élton.

==== Standing ====
Team	Rnk	Pld	W	D	L	GF	GA	GD	Pts
(United Arab Emirates) Al Wasl FC	5	22	8	5	9	41	40	+1	29

==== Results ====
R	Kick Off	Opponents	V	Result	Scorers	Referee
1	2009-09-26 20:15	Bani Yas	H	3 – 3	Saeed Al Kass 6', Blas Pérez 22' (pen), Eissa Ali 71'	(United Arab Emirates) Mohammad AlJunaibi
2	2009-10-04 20:00	Al Shabab	A	3 – 4	Abdullah Darwish 24' (o.g.), Blas Pérez 77' (pen), Blas Pérez 90'	(United Arab Emirates) Mohammad Omar
3	2009-10-17 20:00	Sharjah FC	A	2 – 4	Eissa Ali 13' (pen), Eissa Ali 63' (pen)	(United Arab Emirates) Ali Hamad
4	2009-10-22 17:00	Al Dhafra	H	2 – 0	Alexander Oliveira 50', Alexander Oliveira 59',	(United Arab Emirates) Fahad AlKassar
5	2009-10-30 20:00	Al-Nasr SC	A	1 – 3	Blas Pérez 39',	(United Arab Emirates) Ali AlMulla
6	2009-11-08 20:00	Al-Wahda FC	H	1 – 0	Alexander Oliveira 68',	(United Arab Emirates) Ali Hamad
7	2009-11-29 20:00	Ahli Dubai	A	1 – 1	Alexander Oliveira 13',	(United Arab Emirates) Hamad AlShaikh
8	2009-12-06 20:00	Al Ain Club	A	3 – 1	Isam Darweesh 46', Alexander Oliveira 69', Isam Darweesh 84	(United Arab Emirates) Mohammad Omar
9	2009-12-21 20:00	Ajman Club	H	2 – 1	Alexander Oliveira 37', Douglas dos Santos 50'	(United Arab Emirates) Farid Ali
10	2010-01-11 17:05	Emirates Club	H	5 – 0	Saeed Al Kass 30', Alexander Oliveira 35', Saeed Al Kass 62', Saeed Al Kass 71', Waleed Murad 85' (pen)	(United Arab Emirates) Mohammad Omar
11	2010-01-15 20:00	Al-Jazira Club	A	1 – 2	Alexander Oliveira 47',	(United Arab Emirates) Ali Hamad
12	2010-01-30 17:15	Bani Yas	A	1 – 2	Khalid Darwish 55',	(United Arab Emirates) Ali AlMulla
13	2010-02-05 20:00	Al Shabab	H	2 – 0	Eissa Ali 51', Eissa Ali 74',	(United Arab Emirates) Mohammad Abdullah Hassan
14	2010-02-11 20:00	Sharjah FC	H	0 – 2		(United Arab Emirates) Farid Ali
15	2010-02-20 17:40	Al Dhafra	A	3 – 2	Saeed Al Kass 34', Saeed Al Kass 75', Élton '87	(United Arab Emirates) Mohammad AlJunaibi
16	2010-03-13 20:30	Al-Nasr SC	H	0 – 0		(United Arab Emirates) Mohammad Omar
17	2010-03-20 20:30	Al-Wahda FC	A	0 – 2		(United Arab Emirates) Farid Ali
18	2010-04-08 17:55	Ahli Dubai	H	0 – 0		(United Arab Emirates) AbdulWahid Khater
19	2010-04-22 18:00	Al Ain Club	H	1 – 3	Tariq Hassan '58	(United Arab Emirates) Ammar AlJonaibi
20	2010-05-02 19:30	Ajman Club	A	3 – 4	Soufiane Alloudi 4', Saeed Al Kass 33', Tariq Hassan '64	(United Arab Emirates) Sultan AlMarzouqi
21	2010-05-07 19:40	Emirates Club	A	5 – 4	Soufiane Alloudi 18', Saeed Al Kass 45', Soufiane Alloudi 51', Soufiane Alloudi 57', Saeed Al Kass 69'	(United Arab Emirates) Hamad AlShaikh
22	2010-05-14 19:40	Al-Jazira Club	H	2 – 2	Mohammed Al Balushi 29', Mahir Jasem 80',	(United Arab Emirates) Mohammad Abdullah Hassan

==== Top scorers ====
Player	Goals
(United Arab Emirates) Saeed Al Kass	9
(Brazil) Alexander Oliveira	8
(United Arab Emirates) Eissa Ali	5
(Panama) Blas Pérez	4
(Morocco) Soufiane Alloudi	4
(United Arab Emirates) Isam Darweesh	2
(United Arab Emirates) Tariq Hassan	2
(Brazil) Douglas dos Santos	1
(United Arab Emirates) Waleed Murad	1
(United Arab Emirates) Khalid Darwish	1
(Brazil) Élton	1
(Oman) Mohammed Al Balushi	1
(United Arab Emirates) Mahir Jasem	1

An own goal has also been scored for AlWasl by Al Shabab Club's player Abdullah Darwish

=== 2009–10 UAE President's Cup ===
AlWasl qualified directly to the Round of 16 of the UAE President's Cup. It played against Emirates Club in Khor Fakkan in a match that looked to be an easy task but proved otherwise. Emirates Club was able to beat AlWasl 2-1 in Extra time. The main cause of the early exit from the tournament was Al Wasl's recent triumph after topping their group in the Gulf Club Champions Cup 2009 and also due to the Red Card received by defender Sami Rubaiya.

==== Results ====
Kick Off	Opponents	H / A	Result	Scorers	Referee	Stage
2009-11-24 19:45	Emirates Club	N	1 – 2 (a.e.t.)	Blas Pérez 80'(pen)	(United Arab Emirates) AbdulWahid Khater	Round of 16

=== Etisalat Cup 2009-10 ===
The Etisalat Cup is a gap-filler between the official tournaments. It does not involve the International Players.

==== Standing ====
Team	Rnk	Pld	W	D	L	GF	GA	GD	Pts
(United Arab Emirates) Al Wasl FC	4	6	1	2	3	8	9	-1	5

==== Results ====
Kick Off	Opponents	H / A	Result	Scorers	Referee	Stage
2009-10-09 17:15	Al-Nasr	H	2 – 2	Khalaf Esmail 43', Douglas dos Santos 58',	(United Arab Emirates) Farid Ali	Groups Stage
2009-11-12 17:00	Emirates Club	H	2 – 0	Alexander Oliveira 48', Alexander Oliveira 69',	(United Arab Emirates) Abdullah Karam	Groups Stage
2009-12-10 20:00	Al-Jazira Club	H	0 – 1		(United Arab Emirates) Mohammad AlJunaibi	Groups Stage
2009-12-31 20:00	Al-Jazira Club	A	1 – 2	Mohammed Jamal (UAE footballer) 46'	(United Arab Emirates) AbdulWahid Khater	Groups Stage
2010-01-05 20:00	Al-Nasr	A	2 – 2	Mahir Jasem 30', Douglas dos Santos '34,	(United Arab Emirates) Yaqoub AlHammadi	Groups Stage
2010-02-27 17:35	Emirates Club	H	1 – 2	Tariq Hassan '47,	(United Arab Emirates) Ibrahim Mohammad AlMuhairi	Groups Stage

Al Wasl FC played twice at Home against Emirates Club as per the opponent's request due to the construction works in the Emirates Club Stadium during the first round of the competition.

==== Top scorers ====
Player	Goals
(Brazil) Douglas dos Santos	2
(Brazil) Alexander Oliveira	2
(United Arab Emirates) Khalaf Esmail	1
(United Arab Emirates) Mohammed Jamal	1
(United Arab Emirates) Mahir Jasem	1
(United Arab Emirates) Tariq Hassan	1

== Facts and controversies ==
- Al Wasl was a part of both the two only matches ending with a goalless draw in the UAE League 2009-10 season. The First was against Al Nasr in the 16th round, and the second was against Ahli Dubai in the 18th round. Both matches were played in Al Wasl's ground in Zabeel.

== See also ==
- Al Wasl F.C. season 2008–09
- 2010–11 Al Wasl F.C. season
