= 2006–07 Al Ain FC season =

Al Ain
2006–07 season
- President: Mohammed Bin Zayed
- Manager: Anghel Iordănescu (from 10 June 2006) (until 20 Nov 2006); Tiny Ruys* (from 20 Nov 2006) (until 31 December 2006); Walter Zenga (from 31 December 2006) (until 1 June 2007)
- Stadium: Khalifa bin Zayed
- UAE Football League: 9th
- President's Cup: Runner-ups
- Federation Cup: Group Stage
- AFC Champions League: 2006: Quarter-finals; 2007: Group stage
- Top goalscorer: League: Hawar Mulla; Nenad Jestrović (4); All: Nenad Jestrović (9)
- All statistics correct as of 27 May 2007.

The 2006–07 season was Al Ain Football Club's 39th season in existence and the club's 32nd consecutive season in the top-level football league in the UAE.

== Competitions ==
=== Overview ===
Competition	First match	Last match	Starting round	Final position	Record							
Competition	First match	Last match	Starting round	Final position	Pld	W	D	L	GF	GA	GD	Win %
Football League	29 September 2006	27 May 2007	Matchday 1	9th	22	7	7	8	22	26	−4	31.82
President's Cup	28 October 2006	3 April 2007	Round of 16	Runner-ups	4	3	0	1	10	8	+2	75.00
Federation Cup	10 October 2006	28 December 2006	Group stage	Group stage	4	2	1	1	4	4	+0	50.00
2006 ACL	13 September 2006	20 September 2006	Quarter-finals	Quarter-finals	2	0	1	1	2	5	−3	0.00
2007 ACL	8 March 2006	17 May 2006	Group stage	Group stage	6	1	3	2	5	8	−3	16.67
Total					38	13	12	13	43	51	−8	34.21

Last updated: 27 May 2007
Source: Competitions

=== UAE Football League ===
==== League table ====
Pos	Team	Pld	W	D	L	GF	GA	GD	Pts
7	Al Ahli (Dubai)	22	10	0	12	33	34	−1	30
8	Al Nasr	22	7	7	8	30	32	−2	28
9	Al Ain	22	7	7	8	22	26	−4	28
10	Emirates	22	6	5	11	29	40	−11	23
11	Al Ahly (Fujairah)	22	5	4	13	27	41	−14	19

Source: rsssf.org

==== Matches ====
29 September 2006 2	Al Ain	0–1	Al Ahli	Al Ain
21:30		Report	Adel .A 32'	Stadium: Khalifa bin Zayed; Referee: Ali Al-Badwawi

2 October 2006 3	Al Shabab	3–1	Al Ain	Dubai
21:30	Mobali 31', 32'; E. Obaid 42'	Report	F. Ali 37'	Stadium: Maktoum bin Rashid Al Maktoum; Referee: Fareed Al-Marzouqi

16 October 2006 4	Al Ain	3–1	Al Ahli	Al Ain
21:30	Jestrović 44', 63'; Dodô 71'	Report	Tarish 73'	Stadium: Khalifa bin Zayed; Referee: Ali Al Mulla

21 October 2006 1	Al Shaab	3–3	Al Ain	Sharjah
21:30	S. Ibraheem 39'; Samereh 71'; Hamed .M 77'	Report	Dodô 16'; S. Khater 24'; Jestrović 36'	Stadium: Khalid bin Mohammed Stadium; Referee: Mohamed Omar

2 November 2006 5	Al Wahda	1–0	Al Ain	Abu Dhabi
19:20	I. Matar 75'	Report		Stadium: Al Nahyan Stadium; Referee: Ali Al-Badwawi

7 November 2006 6	Al Ain	0–0	Al Nasr	Al Ain
19:20		Report		Stadium: Khalifa bin Zayed; Referee: Khaled Al-Doukhi

19 November 2006 7	Al Wasl	4–2	Al Ain	Dubai
16:45	Barbosa 35', 52', 75'; Oliveira 71'	Report	Jestrović 77' (pen.); G. Harib 85'	Stadium: Zabeel Stadium; Referee: Mohamed Al Junaibi

17 December 2006 8	Al Ain	0–0	Emirates	Al Ain
16:50		Report		Stadium: Khalifa bin Zayed; Referee: Ali Al Mulla

24 December 2006 9	Sharjah	1–0	Al Ain	Sharjah
19:15	Salim .S 84'	Report		Stadium: Sharjah Stadium; Referee: Mohamed Omar

11 February 2007 10	Al Ain	2–1	Al Jazira	Al Ain
19:50	S. Khater 27', 83'	Report	Alebri 41'	Stadium: Khalifa bin Zayed; Referee: Khaled Al-Doukhi

18 February 2007 11	Al Ain	1–1	Fujairah	Al Ain
17:30	Hawar .M 90'	Report	Almesmari 11'	Stadium: Khalifa bin Zayed; Referee: Mohammed Abdulla

1 March 2007 12	Al Ain	1–0	Al Shaab	Al Ain
20:05	Hawar .M 67'	Report		Stadium: Khalifa bin Zayed; Referee: Fareed Al-Marzouqi

11 March 2007 13	Al Ahli	0–1	Al Ain	Dubai
17:40		Report	Ishak 57'	Stadium: Rashid Stadium; Referee: Ali Al-Badwawi

26 March 2007 14	Al Ain	2–1	Al Shabab	Al Ain
17:50	F. Ali 11'; Adel .A 17' (o.g.)	Report	Suroor .S 41'	Stadium: Khalifa bin Zayed; Referee: Mohamed Al-Zarouni

30 March 2007 15	Dubai	1–1	Al Ain	Dubai
17:50	Dufrennes 26'	Report	N. Khamis 11'	Stadium: Al Aweer Stadium; Referee: Khaled Al-Doukhi

15 April 2007 16	Al Ain	2–3	Al Wahda	Al Ain
20:10	Ongfiang 44' (pen.); Hawar .M 88'	Report	Haider .A 23'; Al-Shehhi 67'; Maurito 89'	Stadium: Khalifa bin Zayed; Referee: Ali Al-Badwawi

19 April 2007 17	Al Nasr	0–1	Al Ain	Dubai
20:10		Report	Hawar .M 55'	Stadium: Al Maktoum Stadium; Referee: Mohamed Al-Zarouni

29 April 2007 18	Al Ain	0–0	Al Wasl	Al Ain
18:05		Report		Stadium: Khalifa bin Zayed; Referee: Ali Al-Badwawi

3 May 2007 19	Emirates	2–0	Al Ain	Ras al-Khaimah
17:55	Khatibi 80'; Enayati 93'	Report		Stadium: Emirates Club Stadium; Referee: Mohamed Omar

13 May 2007 20	Al Ain	0–3	Sharjah	Al Ain
19:45		Report	Shojaei 27', 55'; Tareq .A 66'	Stadium: Khalifa bin Zayed; Referee: Abdullah Karam

18 May 2007 21	Al Jazira	0–2	Al Ain	Abu Dhabi
19:45		Report	Musallem .F 58'; Ongfiang 70'	Stadium: Mohammed bin Zayed; Referee: Khaled Al-Doukhi

27 May 2007 22	Fujairah	0–0	Al Ain	Fujairah
18:15		Report		Stadium: Fujairah Club Stadium; Referee: Hassan Abdulla

=== UAE President's Cup ===
28 October 2006 Round of 16	Ras Al Khaimah	2–5	Al Ain	Dubai
16:55	Shalnk 52', 57'	Report	Jestrović 40', 47', 69', 89'; Dodô 73'	Stadium: Al Maktoum Stadium; Referee: Khaled Al-Doukhi

23 February 2007 Quarter-finals	Al Shaab	2–3	Al Ain	Abu Dhabi
17:35	S. Ibraheem 15'; Kazemian 90'	Report	F. Ali 40'; Al-Wehaibi 62'; Hawar .M 69'	Stadium: Mohammed bin Zayed; Referee: Mohamed Al Junaibi

16 March 2007 Semi-finals	Al Ain	1–0	Fujairah	Sharjah
17:40	F. Ali 64'	Report		Stadium: Sharjah Stadium; Referee: Mohamed Al Junaibi

3 April 2007 Final	Al Wasl	4–1	Al Ain	Abu Dhabi
17:50	Oliveira 12', 44', 61'; Tariq .H 50'	Report	Ongfiang 25'	Stadium: Zayed Sports City; Referee: Mohamed Al Junaibi

=== UAE Federation Cup ===
==== Group stage ====
===== Group B =====
Team	Pld	W	D	L	GF	GA	GD	Pts
Al Nasr	4	2	2	0	6	2	+4	8
Al Ahli	4	2	1	1	5	3	+2	7
Al Ain	4	2	1	1	4	4	0	7
Al Wasl	4	1	1	2	3	5	−2	4
Fujairah	4	0	1	3	1	5	−4	1

Source: goalzz.com

10 October 2006 1	Al Ain	1–0	Al Wasl	Al Ain
21:30	Dodô 23'	Report		Stadium: Khalifa bin Zayed; Referee: Abdelwahid Khatir

3 December 2006 2	Al Nasr	1–1	Al Ain	Dubai
16:45	W. Murad 74'	Report	Kelly 8'	Stadium: Al Maktoum Stadium; Referee: Mohamed Al-Zarouni

8 December 2006 3	Al Ain	1–0	Fujairah	Al Ain
16:45	R. Yaslam 35'	Report		Stadium: Khalifa bin Zayed; Referee: Hamad Bin Hanifa

28 December 2006 4	Al Ahli	3–1	Al Ain	Dubai
16:55	Shah 40'; Abdulrahman .K 58'; Parodi 89' (pen.)	Report	Al-Wehaibi 64' (pen.)	Stadium: Rashid Stadium; Referee: Abdullah Karam

=== 2006 AFC Champions League ===
==== Quarter-finals ====
13 September 2006 First leg	Al Qadisiya (Kuwait)	2–2	(United Arab Emirates) Al Ain	Kuwait City
	Al-Salamah 45', 48'	Report	Jestrović 23'; Dodô 66'	Stadium: Mohammed Al-Hamad Stadium; Attendance: 9,000

20 September 2006 Second leg	Al Ain (United Arab Emirates)	0–3 (2–5 agg.)	(Kuwait) Al Qadisiya	Al Ain
		Report	Bashir 25', 90'; Al-Hinai 90+3'	Stadium: Khalifa bin Zayed; Attendance: 10,000

=== 2007 AFC Champions League ===
==== Group stage ====
===== Group D =====
Team	Pld	W	D	L	GF	GA	GD	Pts
(Iran) Sepahan	6	4	1	1	12	5	+7	13
(Saudi Arabia) Al-Shabab	6	3	1	2	9	3	+6	10
(United Arab Emirates) Al Ain	6	1	3	2	5	8	−3	6
(Syria) Al-Ittihad	6	0	3	3	3	13	−10	3

Source: afcchampionsleague.com

7 March 2007	Al Ain (United Arab Emirates)	0–2	(Saudi Arabia) Al-Shabab	Al Ain
		(Report)	Attram 45'; Al-Gizani 72'	Stadium: Khalifa bin Zayed; Attendance: 3,500; Referee: Abdullah Al Hilali (Oman)

21 March 2007	Al-Ittihad (Syria)	0–0	(United Arab Emirates) Al Ain	Aleppo
		(Report)		Stadium: Al-Hamadaniah Stadium; Attendance: 15,000; Referee: Alaa Abdul-Kadir Nema (Iraq)

11 April 2007	Al Ain (United Arab Emirates)	3–2	(Iran) Sepahan	Al Ain
	Al-Wehaibi 6'; Musallem .F 44'; Ongfiang 84'	(Report)	Salehi 8'; Emad .M 65'	Stadium: Khalifa bin Zayed; Attendance: 7,000; Referee: Chaiwat Kunsuta (Thailand)

25 April 2007	Sepahan (Iran)	1–1	(United Arab Emirates) Al Ain	Isfahan
	Papi 49'	(Report)	Hawar .M 86'	Stadium: Foolad Shahr Stadium; Attendance: 25,000; Referee: Mark Shield (Australia)

9 May 2007	Al-Shabab (Saudi Arabia)	2–0	(United Arab Emirates) Al Ain	Riyadh
	Al Astaa 59'; Al-Gizani 88'	(Report)		Stadium: King Fahd II Stadium; Attendance: 6,000; Referee: Kwon Jong-Chul (South Korea)

23 May 2007	Al Ain (United Arab Emirates)	1–1	(Syria) Al-Ittihad	Al Ain
	G. Harib 53'	(Report)	Sari 90'	Stadium: Khalifa bin Zayed; Attendance: 2,500; Referee: Huang Junjie (China)

== Statistics ==
=== Goalscorers ===
As of 27 May 2007

Includes all competitive matches. The list is sorted alphabetically by surname when total goals are equal.

Rank	Pos.	Player	Football League	President's Cup	Federation Cup	2006 ACL	2007 ACL	Total
1	FW	(Serbia) Nenad Jestrović	4	4	0	1	0	9
2	MF	(Iraq) Hawar Mulla	4	1	0	0	1	6
3	FW	(Brazil) Dodô	2	1	1	1	0	5
4	MF	(Cameroon) Franck Ongfiang	2	1	0	0	1	4
4	FW	(United Arab Emirates) Faisal Ali	2	2	0	0	0	4
6	MF	(United Arab Emirates) Subait Khater	3	0	0	0	0	3
6	MF	(United Arab Emirates) Ali Al-Wehaibi	0	1	1	0	1	3
8	MF	(United Arab Emirates) Gharib Harib	1	0	0	0	1	2
8	DF	(United Arab Emirates) Musallem Fayez	1	0	0	0	1	2
10	MF	(United Arab Emirates) Rami Yaslam	0	0	1	0	0	1
10	FW	(United Arab Emirates) Naseeb Ishak	1	0	0	0	0	1
10	MF	(Brazil) Kelly	0	0	1	0	0	1
10	FW	(United Arab Emirates) Nasser Khamis	1	0	0	0	0	1
Own goals (from the opponents)			1	0	0	0	0	1
Totals			22	10	4	2	5	43
