= 2007–08 Al Ain FC season =

Al Ain
2007–08 season
- President: Mohammed Bin Zayed
- Manager: Tite (from 3 July 2007) (until 22 Dec 2007); Winfried Schäfer (from 26 Dec 2007)
- Stadium: Khalifa bin Zayed
- UAE Football League: 6th
- President's Cup: Round of 16
- Top goalscorer: League: Ousman Jallow (11); All: Ousman Jallow (11)
- All statistics correct as of 24 May 2008.

The 2007–08 season was Al Ain Football Club's 40th season in existence and the club's 33rd consecutive season in the top-level football league in the UAE.

== Competitions ==
=== Overview ===
Competition	First match	Last match	Starting round	Final position	Record							
Competition	First match	Last match	Starting round	Final position	Pld	W	D	L	GF	GA	GD	Win %
Football League	28 September 2007	24 May 2008	Matchday 1	6th	22	9	5	8	41	36	+5	40.91
President's Cup	18 September 2007	5 December 2007	Round of 32	Round of 16	2	1	0	1	7	3	+4	50.00
Total					24	10	5	9	48	39	+9	41.67

Last updated: 24 May 2008
Source: Competitions

=== UAE Football League ===
==== League table ====
Pos	Team	Pld	W	D	L	GF	GA	GD	Pts
4	Sharjah	22	9	6	7	35	35	0	33
5	Al Shaab	22	9	6	7	39	44	−5	33
6	Al Ain	22	9	5	8	41	36	+5	32
7	Al Wasl	22	8	6	8	39	37	+2	30
8	Al Wahda	22	8	6	8	42	42	0	30

Source: rsssf.org

==== Matches ====
28 September 2007 1	Al Ain	4–1	Al Dhafra	Al Ain
21:30	Jallow 37', 86', 88'; N. Khamis 42'	Report	Akbarpour 70'	Stadium: Khalifa bin Zayed; Referee: Ali Al Mulla

21 October 2007 2	Al Shabab	1–0	Al Ain	Dubai
19:15	Mobali 54'	Report		Stadium: Maktoum bin Rashid Al Maktoum; Referee: Mohamed Al-Zarouni

3 November 2007 3	Al Ain	3–1	Al Wasl	Al Ain
19:20	Alloudi 16' (pen.), 87' (pen.); Al-Wehaibi 50'	Report	Dias 11'	Stadium: Khalifa bin Zayed; Referee: Mohamed Omar

1 December 2007 5	Al Ain	3–1	Hatta	Al Ain
16:45	Msarri 28'; Jallow 41'; Alloudi 58'	Report	Abdulrahman .M 19'	Stadium: Khalifa bin Zayed; Referee: Yaseen Al Mansoori

10 December 2007 6	Sharjah	2–1	Al Ain	Sharjah
19:10	Barbosa 14'; Shojaei 58'	Report	Alloudi 8'	Stadium: Sharjah Stadium; Referee: Fareed Al-Marzouqi

22 December 2007 7	Al Ahli	3–0	Al Ain	Dubai
19:15	F. Khalil 10', 35', 89'	Report		Stadium: Rashid Stadium; Referee: Mohamed Al-Zarouni

3 January 2008 8	Al Ain	1–1	Emirates	Al Ain
16:55	Fares .J 19'	Report	Enayati 55'	Stadium: Khalifa bin Zayed; Referee: Khaled Al-Doukhi

17 January 2008 9	Al Nasr	0–3	Al Ain	Dubai
19:15		Report	Ahmed. K 15'; N. Khamis 40'; S. Khater 69' (pen.)	Stadium: Al Maktoum Stadium; Referee: Ali Al Mulla

22 January 2008 4	Al Jazira	1–1	Al Ain	Abu Dhabi
19:25	Koutouan 51'	Report	N. Khamis 67'	Stadium: Mohammed bin Zayed; Referee: Mohamed Al Junaibi

27 January 2008 10	Al Ain	2–3	Al Wahda	Al Ain
19:50	Hilal .M 3'; S. Khater 45'	Report	Basheer .S 24'; Josiel 47'; Al-Shehhi 75'	Stadium: Khalifa bin Zayed; Referee: Mohamed Omar

11 February 2008 11	Al Shaab	2–1	Al Ain	Sharjah
17:20	Y. Hassan 1'; Samereh 85'	Report	Jallow 89' (pen.)	Stadium: Khalid bin Mohammed Stadium; Referee: Fareed Al-Marzouqi

18 February 2008 12	Al Dhafra	1–2	Al Ain	Abu Dhabi
17:25	Idrissu 72'	Report	Jallow 35' (pen.); F. Ali 61'	Stadium: Al Dhafra Stadium; Referee: Abdelwahid Khatir

24 February 2008 13	Al Ain	3–4	Al Shabab	Al Ain
20:10	R. Yaslam 47' (pen.); H. Saeed 51'; N. Khamis 82'	Report	Kazemian 12', 44'; Ferreira 23'; Mobali 79'	Stadium: Khalifa bin Zayed; Referee: Mohamed Al-Zarouni

6 March 2008 14	Al Wasl	0–0	Al Ain	Dubai
20:10		Report		Stadium: Zabeel Stadium; Referee: Khaled Al-Doukhi

14 March 2008 15	Al Ain	4–3	Al Jazira	Al Ain
20:20	Jallow 14', 83'; Fares .J 65'; S. Khater 90'	Report	Dada 17'; Koutouan 29', 31'	Stadium: Khalifa bin Zayed; Referee: Mohamed Omar

31 March 2008 16	Hatta	0–1	Al Ain	Hatta
17:45		Report	Alloudi 39'	Stadium: Hamdan Bin Rashid Stadium; Referee: Ali Al Mulla

5 April 2008 17	Al Ain	3–3	Sharjah	Al Ain
20:30	Jallow 7', 64'; Fares .J 14'	Report	Abdelwahab 31', 50', 70'	Stadium: Khalifa bin Zayed; Referee: Fareed Al-Marzouqi

19 April 2008 18	Al Ain	1–1	Al Ahli	Al Ain
18:00	Pedrinho 67'	Report	A. Abbas 68'	Stadium: Khalifa bin Zayed; Referee: Mohamed Al Junaibi

28 April 2008 19	Emirates	1–2	Al Ain	Ras al-Khaimah
17:55	Rajabzadeh 35'	Report	Jallow 10'; Fares .J 60'	Stadium: Emirates Club Stadium; Referee: Abdelwahid Khatir

12 May 2008 20	Al Ain	2–1	Al Nasr	Al Ain
19:35	Salem .A 6'; Ahmed. K 89'	Report	Abreu 45'	Stadium: Khalifa bin Zayed; Referee: Fahad Al-Kassar

16 May 2008 21	Al Wahda	4–3	Al Ain	Abu Dhabi
19:50	Alecsandro 32', 76'; Al-Shehhi 47'; Pinga 74'	Report	Alloudi 13', 65'; Pedrinho 71'	Stadium: Al Nahyan Stadium; Referee: Abdelwahid Khatir

24 May 2008 22	Al Ain	1–2	Al Shaab	Al Ain
19:55	Alloudi 16'	Report	Samereh 69', 90'	Stadium: Khalifa bin Zayed; Referee: Abdulla Al Ajel

=== UAE President's Cup ===
18 September 2007 Round of 32	Dibba	1–5	Al Ain	Dubai
21:30	Al Kaabi 24'	Report	Ahmed. K 11'; N. Khamis 49', 78'; F. Ali 51'; Shehab .A 77'	Stadium: Zabeel Stadium; Referee: Bader Abdullah

5 December 2007 Round of 16	Sharjah	2–2 (a.e.t.) (8–7 p)	Al Ain	Abu Dhabi
19:45	Barbosa 36', 96'	Report	Alloudi 69' (pen.); Msarri 105'	Stadium: Mohammed bin Zayed; Referee: Mohamed Omar

== Statistics ==
=== Goalscorers ===
As of 24 May 2008

Includes all competitive matches. The list is sorted alphabetically by surname when total goals are equal.

Rank	Pos.	Player	Football League	President's Cup	Total
1	FW	(The Gambia) Ousman Jallow	11	0	11
2	FW	(Morocco) Soufiane Alloudi	8	1	9
3	FW	(United Arab Emirates) Nasser Khamis	4	2	6
4	DF	(United Arab Emirates) Fares Jumaa	4	0	4
5	MF	(United Arab Emirates) Ahmed Khamis	2	1	3
5	MF	(United Arab Emirates) Subait Khater	3	0	3
7	FW	(Brazil) Pedrinho	2	0	2
7	FW	(United Arab Emirates) Faisal Ali	1	1	2
7	DF	(United Arab Emirates) Ali Msarri	1	1	2
10	DF	(United Arab Emirates) Hilal Al Mesmari	1	0	1
10	MF	(United Arab Emirates) Ali Al-Wehaibi	1	0	1
10	MF	(United Arab Emirates) Rami Yaslam	1	0	1
10	MF	(United Arab Emirates) Helal Saeed	1	0	1
10	MF	(United Arab Emirates) Shehab Ahmed	0	1	1
10	MF	(United Arab Emirates) Salem Abdullah	1	0	1
Own goals (from the opponents)			0	0	0
Totals			41	7	48
