= 2008–09 UAE Pro League =

UAE Pro League
- Season: 2008–09
- Champions: Al-Ahli
- Relegated: Al-Shaab; Al Khaleej Club
- Top goalscorer: Fernando Baiano (25)

The 2008–09 UAE Pro League season was the 34th edition of top level football in the United Arab Emirates and started on 19 September 2008 until 24 May 2009.

Al-Ahli clinched the championship on the last day of the season, also qualifying for the 2009 FIFA Club World Cup as the host representative.

Al-Shabab were defending champions from the 2007–08 campaign.

Emirates and Hatta were relegated from the previous season. Ajman and Al-Khaleej were promoted from the second level.

The winners of the league qualified for the 2009 edition of the FIFA Club World Cup as the host representative.

== Clubs ==
Locations of teams in the 2016–17 UAE Pro League

Club	Coach	Nationality	City	Stadium	2007–2008 season	Notes
Al-Shabab	Toninho Cerezo	(Brazil)	Dubai	Al Maktoum Stadium	UAE League Champions	AFC Champions League 2009 Qualifier
Al-Jazira	Abel Braga	(Brazil)	Abu Dhabi	Al Jazira Mohammed Bin Zayed Stadium	2nd in UAE League	AFC Champions League 2009 Qualifier
Al-Ahli	Ivan Hašek	(Czech Republic)	Dubai	Rashed Stadium	3rd in UAE League	AFC Champions League 2009 Qualifier
Al-Sharjah	Youssef Al Zawawi	(Tunisia)	Sharjah	Sharjah Stadium	4th in UAE League	AFC Champions League 2009 Qualifier
Al-Shaab	Luka Peruzović	(Croatia)	Sharjah	Khalid Bin Mohammed Stadium	5th in UAE League	2008–09 Arab Champions League Qualifier - Later Withdrew
Al-Ain	Winfried Schäfer	(Germany)	Al Ain	Sheikh Khalifa International Stadium	6th in UAE League	
Al-Wasl	Miroslav Beránek	(Czech Republic)	Dubai	Zabeel Stadium	7th in UAE League	
Al-Wahda	Ahmad Abdulhaleem	(Egypt)	Abu Dhabi	Al-Nahyan Stadium	8th in UAE League	
Al-Nasr	Luka Bonačić	(Croatia)	Dubai	Al-Maktoum Stadium	9th in UAE League	
Al-Dhafra	Mohammad Kwid	(Syria)	Dhafra	Al Dhafra Stadium	10th in UAE League	
Ajman	Abdul Wahab Abdul Qader	(Iraq)	Ajman	Ajman Stadium	Promoted	
Al-Khaleej	Sammir Juwaili	(Tunisia)	Khor Fakkan	Al Baladi Stadium	Promoted	

== Managerial changes ==
Team	Outgoing manager	Manner of departure	Replaced by
Al-Wasl	(Czech Republic) Miroslav Beranek	Sacked	(Brazil) Hélio dos Anjos
Al-Wahda	(Egypt) Ahmad Abdulhaleem	Sacked	(Austria) Josef Hickersberger
Al-Dhafra	(Syria) Mohammad Kwid	Resigned	(United Arab Emirates) Eid Baroot
Al-Sharjah	(Tunisia) Youssef Al Zawawi	Resigned after 11 games	(Portugal) Toni Oliveira
Al-Wasl	(Brazil) Hélio dos Anjos	Sacked	(Czech Republic) Jaroslav Horák
Ajman	(Iraq) Abdul Wahab Abdul Qader	Sacked	
Al-Sharjah	(Portugal) Toni Oliveira	Sacked after 'poor results'	(Iraq) Abdul Wahab Abdul Qader
Al-Ahli	(Czech Republic) Ivan Hašek	Quit after winning championship	(Romania) Ioan Andone

== Foreign players ==
Club	Player 1	Player 2	Player 3	Player 4	Former players
Ajman	(Iran) Ali Samereh	(Iran) Javad Kazemian	(Morocco) Abdelhaq Ait Laarif	(Morocco) Mohamed Berrabeh	
Al-Ahli	(Brazil) Baré	(Brazil) Clederson	(Brazil) Osvaldo	(Iran) Milad Meydavoudi	(Argentina) Jorge Artigas (Egypt) Hosny Abd Rabo
Al-Ain	(Brazil) André Dias	(Chile) Jorge Valdivia	(Morocco) Soufiane Alloudi	(Senegal) André Senghor	
Al-Dhafra	(Algeria) Toufik Zerara	(Togo) Mohamed Kader			(Iran) Mehdi Rajabzadeh (Iran) Rasoul Khatibi
Al-Jazira	(Brazil) Fernando Baiano	(Brazil) Márcio Rozário	(Brazil) Rafael Sóbis	(Iraq) Mohammed Ali Karim	(Brazil) Radamés (Mali) Mamadou Diallo (Nigeria) Abdulafees Abdulsalam
Al-Khaleej	(Morocco) Mourad Rafal	(Morocco) Rabii Houbri	(Nigeria) Abass Lawal	(Tunisia) Anis Boujelbene	
Al-Nasr	(Brazil) Claudinho	(Iran) Mehrzad Madanchi	(Iran) Mohammad Nosrati	(Iran) Reza Enayati	(Nigeria) Endurance Idahor (Qatar) Mohammed Salem Al-Enazi
Al-Shaab	(Ghana) Godwin Attram	(Morocco) Merouane Zemmama	(Sierra Leone) Mohamed Kallon		
Al-Shabab	(Brazil) Marcos Assunção	(Brazil) Renato Abreu	(Iran) Mehrdad Oladi	(Zimbabwe) Musawengosi Mguni	
Al-Sharjah	(Brazil) Anderson Barbosa	(Brazil) Jean	(Brazil) Roberto Lopes	(Iraq) Hussein Alaa Hussein	
Al-Wahda	(Brazil) Pinga	(Iraq) Ali Salah Hashim	(Morocco) Amin Erbati	(Senegal) Matar Coly	(Bahrain) Abdulla Al-Dakeel (Brazil) Alecsandro (Tunisia) Karim Aouadhi
Al-Wasl	(Brazil) Alexandre Oliveira	(Brazil) Reiner Ferreira	(Iran) Iman Mobali	(Italy) Fabio Firmani	(Brazil) Rogerinho (Ivory Coast) Zeka Goore

== Standings ==
Pos	Team	Pld	W	D	L	GF	GA	GD	Pts	Qualification or relegation
1	Al-Ahli (C)	22	17	4	1	54	25	+29	55	2009 Club World Cup and 2010 AFC Champions League Group Stage
2	Al Jazira	22	17	3	2	57	17	+40	54	2010 AFC Champions League Group Stage
3	Al Ain	22	12	7	3	40	20	+20	43	2010 AFC Champions League Group Stage
4	Al-Wahda	22	10	4	8	40	39	+1	34	2010 AFC Champions League Qualifying play-off (Note: Since Al-Ain also won the 2008–09 UAE President's Cup, the fourth-placed team of the league also qualified for the 2010 AFC Champions League.)
5	Al Shabab	22	8	4	10	33	37	−4	28	2009–10 Gulf Club Champions Cup
6	Al Nasr	22	6	8	8	37	40	−3	26	
7	Al Wasl	22	7	5	10	38	45	−7	26	2009–10 Gulf Club Champions Cup
8	Al-Dhafra	22	5	9	8	32	32	0	24	
9	Ajman	22	7	3	12	21	39	−18	24	
10	Al Sharjah	22	6	4	12	31	45	−14	22	
11	Al-Shaab (R)	22	5	3	14	23	37	−14	18	Relegation to 2009–10 UAE League Division 1
12	Al Khaleej Club (R)	22	4	2	16	21	51	−30	14	Relegation to 2009–10 UAE League Division 1

Rules for classification: 1) points; 2) goal difference; 3) number of goals scored.
(C) Champions; (R) Relegated
Notes:

UAE League 2008–09 winners

5th title

== Top goalscorers ==
Source: goalzz.com

25 goals

- (Brazil) Fernando Baiano (Al Jazira)

13 goals

- (United Arab Emirates) Mohamed Omer (Al-Nasr) (also UFL Top Scorer)
- (Togo) Mohamed Kader (Dhafra)

12 goals

- (Brazil) Anderson Barbosa (Sharjah)
- (Ghana) Godwin Attram (Al-Shaab)
- (Brazil) Pinga (Al Wahda)

11 goals

- (Brazil) Baré (Al-Ahli)

9 goals

- (United Arab Emirates) Faisal Khalil (Al-Ahli)
- (Brazil) Alexandre Oliveira (Al Wasl)
- (Iran) Mehrzad Madanchi (Al-Nasr)
- (Chile) Jorge Valdivia (Al Ain)
