= Ahmed Khamis =

Emirati footballer (born 1985)

Personal information
- Date of birth: 16 November 1985 (age 40)
- Place of birth: UAE
- Height: 1.69 m (5 ft 7 in)
- Positions: Right winger; right back

Youth career
- Fujairah

Senior career*
Years	Team	Apps	(Gls)
2006	Fujairah	0	(0)
2006–2010	Al Ain	0	(0)
2010–2012	Al Ahli	11	(4)
2012–2015	Al-Sharjah SC	38	(8)
2015–2016	Baniyas		
2016–2018	Al-Nasr	36	(7)
2018	→ Hatta (loan)	6	(2)
2018–2020	Dibba Al-Fujairah		
2020–2022	Al Urooba		
2022–2023	Emirates		
- * Club domestic league appearances and goals as of 14 March 2018

Ahmed Khamis (Arabic: أحمد خميس; born 16 November 1985), also known as Ahmed, is an Emirati footballer who plays as a right winger and right back.

== Honours ==
=== Club ===
Al Ain

- Etisalat Emirates Cup: 1

2008–09

- UAE President's Cup: 1

2008–09
