= Alexandre Guimarães =

Brazilian-Costa Rican footballer (born 1959)

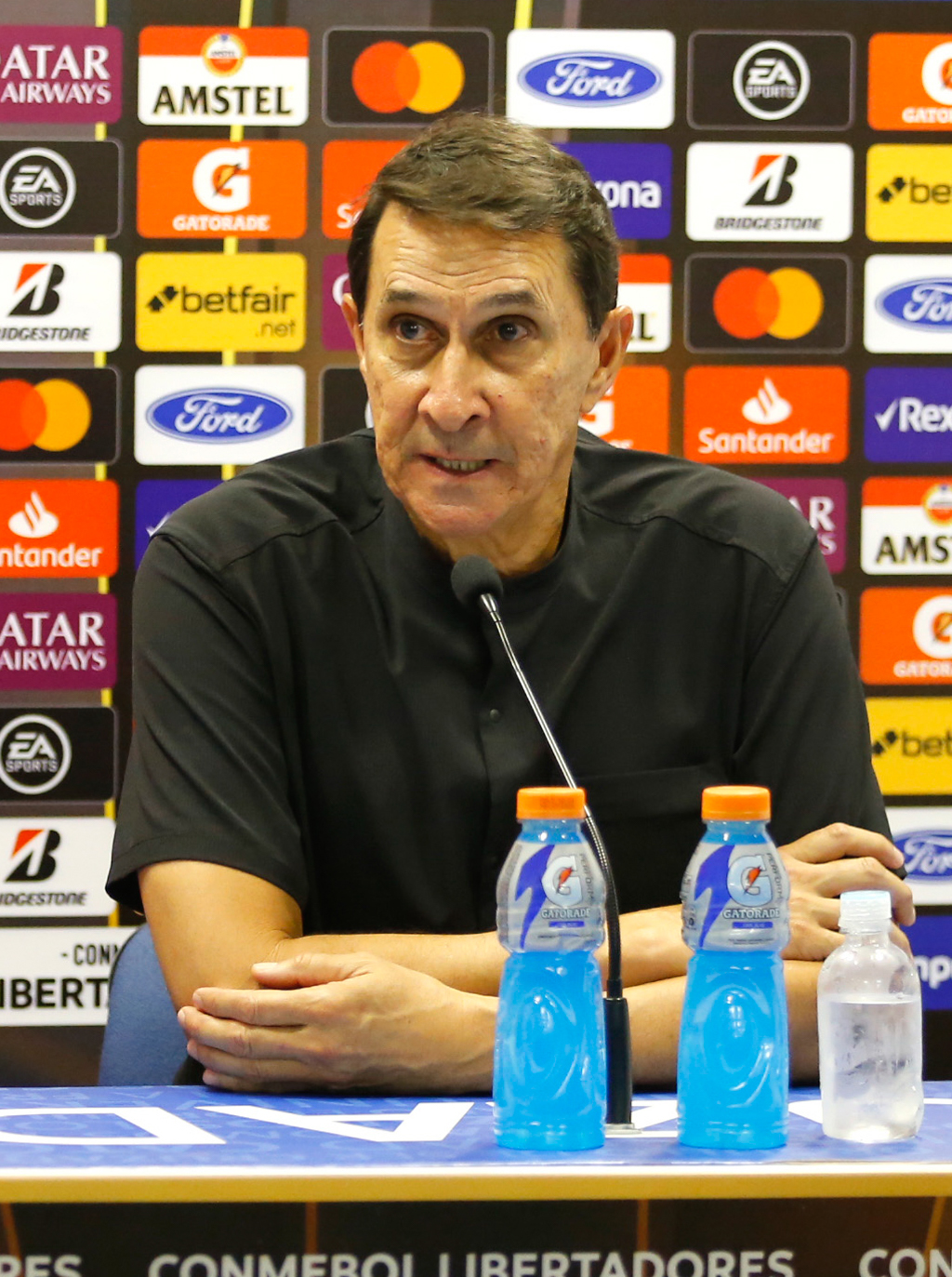
- Guimarães with América de Cali in 2020.

Personal information
- Full name: Alexandre Henrique Borges Guimarães
- Date of birth: 7 November 1959 (age 67)
- Place of birth: Maceió, Alagoas, Brazil
- Height: 1.89 m (6 ft 2 1/2 in)
- Position: Midfielder

Youth career
- Fluminense

Senior career*
Years	Team	Apps	(Gls)
1979	Durpanel	23	(16)
1980–1981	Puntarenas	53	(19)
1982–1991	Saprissa	299	(75)
1992	Turrialba	21	(1)
Total		396	(111)

International career
1985–1990	Costa Rica	16	(2)

Managerial career
- 1994–1996: Belén
- 1996–1997: Herediano
- 1997–1999: Saprissa
- 1999: Comunicaciones
- 1999–2000: Saprissa
- 2001–2002: Costa Rica
- 2003: Cartaginés
- 2004: Irapuato
- 2004: Dorados
- 2005–2006: Costa Rica
- 2006–2008: Panamá
- 2007–2008: Panamá U23
- 2009–2010: Al-Wasl
- 2010–2011: Al-Dhafra
- 2011–2012: Saprissa
- 2012–2013: Tianjin Teda
- 2016–2018: Mumbai City
- 2019–2020: América de Cali
- 2020–2021: Atlético Nacional
- 2022–2023: América de Cali
- 2024–2025: Alajuelense
Medal record
Representing Costa Rica
Men's football
CONCACAF Championship
Gold medal – first place	1989	Football
- * Club domestic league appearances and goals

Alexandre Henrique Borges Guimarães (born 7 November 1959) is a football manager and former midfielder. Born in Brazil, he played for the Costa Rica national team.

== Club career ==
=== Early career ===
Guimarães was born on 7 November 1959 in the city of Maceió, Alagoas, in the northeast of Brazil. He is widely influenced by footballers like Pelé, Garrincha, and Zagallo, and started practicing the sport in youth system of club Fluminense. At age of 13, he and his parents Luis de Souza Borges and Maria Alice Guimarães moved to Costa Rica, as part of their jobs at the World Health Organization. Alexandre is the youngest son of that relationship, having four siblings: Carlos, Guillermo, and Ana. When Alexandre arrived in Costa Rica, he had many problems to communicate with people because of the language difference. However, he started to learn Spanish and was making new friends so new opportunities were given him in activities. A young Guimarães began studying in Saint Francis College located in Moravia city. He represented his school team in disciplines of football and basketball, and also for two to three years he was part of local club in Barrio Escalante, playing many matches. In 1977, Alexandre traveled to México where he studied Physical Education, career that he continued at University of Costa Rica. Upon his return, friends told him to join a soccer team where he can show his skills. During an internal championship played at the university, by influence of Walter Taylor, Alexandre was signed by Durpanel San Blas that was about to compete in the second division of Costa Rica. He made his debut on 25 March 1979 in an away 5–1 defeat against Pérez Zeledón. On 22 April he scored his first two goals in the league over Puriscal (5–4). He ended the season as the top scorer with 16 goals. Despite the good numbers reached in the season, Durpanel was relegated after ending in last place. Alexandre combined football with basketball and played for Asturias de Puntarenas.

=== Puntarenas ===
On 22 January 1980, it was announced that Guimarães had signed a two-year contract with Costa Rican club Municipal Puntarenas. He made his debut on 13 April, playing 90 minutes of a 0–1 win over San Carlos. On 11 May, Alexandre scored his first goal which Puntarenas won 6–0 over Alajuelense. His club qualified to second round, but it was not enough to advance to the final. Guimarães scored 12 goals in 38 matches and finished third in scoring tables, three goals behind Carlos Torres and one goal behind Gerardo Solano.

The following season, Alexandre completed 15 matches and scored 7 goals. His skills as midfielder and striker made him an efficient player for the club.

=== Saprissa ===
On 17 November 1981, top Costa Rican club Saprissa announced the signing of Guimarães. On 28 February he made his clásico debut against Alajuelense in the first match of the 1982 league season; the game ended with 2–1 defeat. On 22 December, the second leg of the final match against Puntarenas, he scored the goal that led his club to a victory that would hand them their first league title in four years. Alexandre finished the season with 42 matches played and scored 9 goals.

He spent 9 years in the club and reached two more league titles at the 1988–89 and 1989–90 seasons. Guimarães scored 76 goals in 323 matches for all competitions including league, CONCACAF Champions Cup, and Central American tournament that served as qualifier for Champions Cup. After becoming Saprissa head coach, on 15 November 1991, Rolando Villalobos informed Guimarães he was no longer wanted in the team because of his physical conditions.

=== Turrialba ===
On 4 February 1992, Alexandre signed with Turrialba for the rest of the season, scoring once in 21 matches. After that, he decided not to renew his contract, so he retired from professional football.

== International career ==
After being granted with the Costa Rican nationality on 17 January 1985, Alexandre was eligible to represent the Costa Rica national team. He received his first call-up on 21 August 1985 by coach Álvaro Grant and made his senior debut on 1 September in a 0–0 draw against Canada. Alexandre scored his first goal on 8 September over Honduras (3–1 defeat).

Guimarães had 16 appearances and scored 2 goals. He also participated in the first stage of the 1989 CONCACAF Championship, that served as qualifier for the 1990 World Cup. He was a member of the Costa Rican team during the World Cup. After being a substitute in the first match against Scotland (1–0 victory), Guimarães would see action in the last 12 minutes against Brazil (1–0 loss), replacing Juan Cayasso. This was the first time that a footballer born in Brazil played against the representative of his country of origin in a World Cup. He then repeated his variant role in the game that closed the group stage against Sweden (1–2 win), as well as the round of 16 against Czechoslovakia (4–1 loss).

== Managerial career ==
After his professional football retirement at the age of 32, he ventured into the field as a color commentator on Canal 7, and it was this way that he would be preparing himself to be a head coach. He studied in Germany, France, Italy and Spain through intensive courses and along his journey he learned five languages: Portuguese, Spanish, German, French and Italian. After his return he was in charge of the Saprissa youth system league, and later became the assistant of the Uruguayan Carlos Linaris of the absolute team.

On 19 December 1994, he was appointed head coach of Belén with the initial task of avoiding the relegation zone. When the opportunity was presented to him, Alexandre asked Linaris for advice and he told him: "Guima, come on, you're ready." He made his competitive debut on 24 December in a 0–2 loss against San Carlos. In this club he was able to exceed expectations and quickly identified the figures who helped him realize his idea, such as José Pablo Fonseca, Walter Centeno, Óscar Ramírez, Geraldo Da Silva, Luis Fernández, Gilbert Solano and Alfredo Contreras. On 2 June 1996, he won his first title as a coach, winning the Costa Rican Cup undefeated and beating Cartaginés in the final match.

On 17 July 1996, his incorporation as Herediano's new head coach was made official, replacing the Spanish Juan Luis Hernández. Although he was only there for one season, he received the distinction of best national coach. On 28 May 1997, his departure from the rojimarillo team was announced, since he had offers from other clubs. He was officially presented with Deportivo Saprissa on 22 July 1997. As coach, he won the league twice in the 1997–98 and 1998–99 seasons, as well as the Torneo Grandes de Centroamérica in 1998. On 3 May 1999, Alexandre announced that he would be leaving the team once the season ended to join Guatemalan club Comunicaciones.

On 21 May 1999, Guimarães started his tenure as Comunicaciones coach. However, he resigned on 2 September due to the poor results of the team at the UNCAF Interclub Cup despite he was having a good record in national league. On 13 September, he was appointed as Saprissa coach once again, replacing Carlos Santana.

On 8 May 2000, Alexandre accepted the offer to become the assistant of Gílson Nunes in the Costa Rica national team, and was also appointed coach of the U23 team. He was questioned for his relaxed attitude in the quadrangular phase of the World Cup qualifiers, where on several occasions he had to watch the games from the stands, which was evidence of the communication problems that arose between Nunes and Guimarães in that period. After the resignation of the Brazilian coach on 16 November, Alexandre was recommended by Nunes himself to be in charge of the absolute team, a fact that ended up taking place but in exchange he had to leave his position as the manager of the U23 team. He debuted on 6 January 2001 in the 5–2 victory over Guatemala, in the play-off that determined the team qualified for the final round. His team qualified for the 2002 World Cup as the leader of this phase with 23 points. Prior to qualifying for the competition, he also managed the team through other competitions like UNCAF Nations Cup and Copa América tournaments in 2001, and was runner-up at the 2002 CONCACAF Gold Cup.

The 2002 World Cup was his last coached competition with the national team. He debuted in the top tournament on 4 June at the Gwangju World Cup Stadium against China, winning the match 0–2. On 9 June, at the Munhak Stadium against Turkey, there was a 1–1 draw and on 13 June, their team lost 2–5 to Brazil, a result that left Costa Rica eliminated due to goal difference with Turkey who were the second qualified in the group.

On 17 June 2003, Alexandre ended up the rumors that linked him to the Honduras national team by signing the one-year deal for Costa Rican club Cartaginés. He was accompanied by his assistant César Eduardo Méndez and physical trainer Rodolfo Fernández. Alexandre and his staff he brought to the team, it was known their salary was of thirty thousand dollars, half of it was paid by Teletica. On 18 November, he was fired from his position due to the poor results that the team presented in the Apertura Tournament, having a balance of eight defeats, three draws and three victories.

On 15 December 2003, he signed the contract with the Mexican Primera División club Irapuato. On 16 June 2004, he did not reach an agreement to continue with the club. On 24 June of that year, he signed his contract for one year at Dorados de Sinaloa, a team recently promoted to the top category. On 24 October, he resigned after the 0–1 defeat against Toluca, added to the poor performance of three wins, two draws and seven losses.

On 1 April 2005, Costa Rica national team appointed Guimarães as manager for the second time, which was competing in the World Cup qualifying final round, replacing the previous manager Jorge Luis Pinto. On 8 October, they won 3–0 over the United States and secured qualification for the 2006 World Cup with one game left for the conclusion of the round. At the 2006 World Cup, Alexandre debuted in his second tournament on 9 June on the opening match against the host Germany (4–2 defeat), at the Munich Stadium. The remaining matches ended up with losses against Ecuador (3–0) and Poland (1–2). Costa Rica were eliminated from the tournament without scoring points and finished in position 31. After the undesirable participation in the world tournament, on 3 July 2006, Guimarães submitted his resignation, voiding the four-year contract he had signed.

On 15 November 2006, he was appointed as the manager of the Panama national team, and at the same time he was appointed coach of U23 team. He managed the Panamanian team in the 2007 UNCAF Nations Cup and finished as runner-up, and also he reached the quarterfinals of the CONCACAF Gold Cup in 2007 as well. With the U23 representative, he managed the team to group stage of the Olympic Qualifying, but was not able to advance to knockout stage. On 24 June 2008, Guimarães got separated from the national team after their early elimination of the 2010 World Cup qualification.

On 1 May 2009, Alexandre was signed to manage the Emirati team Al-Wasl. On 27 April 2010, they became champions of the 2009–10 Gulf Club Champions Cup. On 18 May he announced that he would not continue with the team.

On 24 November 2010 he became coach of Al-Dhafra club to avoid relegation zone. Alexandre made his competitive debut on 26 November in a 2–1 win over Baniyas, for the group stage of the Emirates Cup. His first match on league ended 1–1 against Al-Nasr on 13 December. On 26 March 2011, Guimarães was sacked by Al-Dhafra after 4 months in charge of the club, a day after the team lost 0–1 to Al Shabab. He was replaced by Syrian Mohammad Kwid to face the remaining seven games of the end of the season.

On 27 May 2011, Guimarães was officially confirmed as Saprissa manager for the third time, after a long period of eleven years. He managed the team during the championships played in the season of Invierno 2011 and Verano 2012, reaching the semifinals in both competitions. On 10 May 2012, Saprissa announce that Alexandre would not continue in the club for the following season.

On 31 May 2012, he was appointed as coach of Tianjin Teda of the Chinese Super League, where he was signed for the rest of the season as well as the upcoming one. On 30 October 2013, he led the team to push away from the relegation zone. His contract expired at the end of that season.

On 19 April 2016, Guimarães was appointed head coach of Indian side Mumbai City, replacing former coach Nicolas Anelka. On 14 August 2018, he left by mutual agreement between both parties.

On 13 June 2019, Alexandre was appointed as the manager of América de Cali in Colombia, accompanied by Juliano Silveira as assistant and Rodrigo Poletto as physical trainer. In the Torneo Finalización he accessed the second round after finishing second in the general table. In this phase he led group B and reached the final series for the title against the leader of group A, Junior. On 7 December, América proclaimed champions of the league after winning the second leg 2–0. His team broke the eleven-year streak without winning a league title. On 1 June 2020, Guimarães could not reach an agreement for a contract renewal that included a thirty percent salary reduction.

On 30 November 2020, Colombian club Atlético Nacional announced that Alexandre signed the one-year contract as its new coach, replacing Juan Carlos Osorio. On 5 June 2021, he left the team by mutual consent, after having had a poor performance in the group stage of the Copa Libertadores.

On 6 April 2022, Guimarães returned to América de Cali, replacing sacked Juan Carlos Osorio. On 22 June 2023, the team released an official note stating that Alexandre had left the club due for contract expiring.

On 12 March 2024, he was appointed head coach of Alajuelense. He made his competitive debut on 14 March in a 1–1 draw against New England Revolution for CONCACAF Champions Cup. In Primera División, he reached the final matches, but he was not able to win the league due to the 3–1 loss in aggregate score against Saprissa. On 17 July 2024, Alexandre won his first trophy of the season after defeating Saprissa 3–1 for the Recopa.

== Career statistics ==
=== Club ===
Appearances and goals by club, season and competition
Club	Season	League			National Cup (Note: Includes Costa Rican Cup)		Continental		Other		Total	
Club	Season	Division	Apps	Goals	Apps	Goals	Apps	Goals	Apps	Goals	Apps	Goals
Durpanel	1979	Segunda División	23	16	—		—		—		23	16
Durpanel	Total		23	16	—		—		—		23	16
Puntarenas	1980	Primera División	38	12	—		—		—		38	12
Puntarenas	1981	Primera División	15	7	—		—		—		15	7
Puntarenas	Total		53	19	—		—		—		53	19
Saprissa	1982	Primera División	42	9	—		—		—		42	9
Saprissa	1983	Primera División	27	2	—		2 (Note: Appearances in CONCACAF Champions Cup)	0	2 (Note: Appearances in Copa Fraternidad)	0	31	2
Saprissa	1984	Primera División	41	16	3	0	—		—		44	16
Saprissa	1985	Primera División	37	5	—		—		—		37	5
Saprissa	1986	Primera División	36	12	—		2 (Note: Appearances in CONCACAF Champions Cup)	0	—		38	12
Saprissa	1987	Primera División	32	9	—		2 (Note: Appearances in CONCACAF Champions Cup)	0	6 (Note: Appearances in Torneo Centroamericano)	0	40	9
Saprissa	1988	Primera División	22	4	—		—		—		22	4
Saprissa	1989	Primera División	24	11	—		—		—		24	11
Saprissa	1991	Primera División	38	7	—		—		7 (Note: Appearances in Torneo Centroamericano)	1	45	8
Saprissa	Total		299	75	3	0	6	0	15	1	323	76
Turrialba	1992	Primera División	21	1	—		—		—		21	1
Turrialba	Total		21	1	—		—		—		21	1
Career total			396	111	3	0	6	0	15	1	420	112

=== International ===
Appearances and goals by national team and year
National team	Year	Apps	Goals
Costa Rica	1985	2	1
Costa Rica	1987	1	0
Costa Rica	1988	5	0
Costa Rica	1989	3	1
Costa Rica	1990	5	0
Total		16	2

Scores and results list Costa Rica's goal tally first, score column indicates score after each Guimarães goal

No.	Date	Venue	Opponent	Score	Result	Competition
1	8 September 1985	Estadio Tiburcio Carías Andino, Tegucigalpa, Honduras	Honduras	1–1	1–3	1986 FIFA World Cup qualification
2	7 February 1989	Estadio Nacional, San José, Costa Rica	Poland	1–1	2–4	Friendly match

=== Managerial ===
As of match played 18 April 2025

Managerial record by team and tenure
Team	From	To	Record								Ref.
Team	From	To	M	W	D	L	GF	GA	GD	Win %	Ref.
Belén	19 December 1994	17 July 1996	73	25	27	21	81	68	+13	34.25	
Herediano	17 July 1996	30 June 1997	40	23	9	8	77	30	+47	57.50	
Saprissa	22 July 1997	19 May 1999	113	65	36	12	239	87	+152	57.52	
Comunicaciones	20 May 1999	2 September 1999	11	7	0	4	24	17	+7	63.64	
Saprissa	13 September 1999	8 May 2000	39	26	7	6	78	39	+39	66.67	
Costa Rica	16 November 2000	30 June 2002	34	16	9	9	54	37	+17	47.06	
Cartaginés	17 June 2003	18 November 2003	14	3	3	8	15	25	−10	21.43	
Irapuato	15 December 2003	16 June 2004	19	6	8	5	23	30	−7	31.58	
Dorados	24 June 2004	24 October 2004	12	3	2	7	16	22	−6	25.00	
Costa Rica	1 April 2005	3 July 2006	22	7	2	13	28	40	−12	31.82	
Panama	15 November 2006	24 June 2008	24	7	10	7	24	29	−5	29.17	
Panama U23	15 November 2006	24 June 2008	7	3	1	3	8	6	+2	42.86	
Al-Wasl	1 May 2009	18 May 2010	37	12	11	14	63	62	+1	32.43	
Al-Dhafra	24 November 2010	26 March 2011	15	6	2	7	21	17	+4	40.00	
Saprissa	27 May 2011	10 May 2012	44	20	15	9	75	48	+27	45.45	
Tianjin Teda	31 May 2012	31 December 2013	51	18	16	17	56	62	−6	35.29	
Mumbai City	19 April 2016	14 August 2018	36	14	8	14	46	43	+3	38.89	
América de Cali	13 June 2019	1 June 2020	40	19	10	11	54	45	+9	47.50	
Atlético Nacional	30 November 2020	5 June 2021	31	14	7	10	54	31	+23	45.16	
América de Cali	6 April 2022	22 June 2023	60	21	19	20	71	61	+10	35.00	
Alajuelense	12 March 2024	Present	72	37	28	7	112	60	+52	51.39	
Total			794	352	230	212	1,219	859	+360	44.33	

== Honours ==
=== Player ===
Saprissa

- Primera División: 1982, 1988–89, 1989–90

Costa Rica

- CONCACAF Championship: 1989

Individual

- Segunda División top goalscorer: 1979

=== Manager ===
Belén

- Costa Rican Cup: 1996

Saprissa

- Primera División: 1997–98, 1998–99
- Torneo Grandes de Centroamérica: 1998

Al-Wasl

- Gulf Club Champions Cup: 2009–10

América de Cali

- Primera A: Finalización 2019

Alajuelense

- Recopa de Costa Rica: 2024

Individual

- Costa Rican Primera División Best National Manager: 1996–97
- Coach of the Year in Primera A: 2019
