= Douglas (footballer, born 1982) =

Brazilian footballer

Personal information
- Full name: Douglas dos Santos
- Date of birth: 18 February 1982 (age 44)
- Place of birth: Criciúma, Brazil
- Height: 1.76 m (5 ft 9 in)
- Position: Attacking midfielder

Youth career
- 1997–2001: Criciúma

Senior career*
Years	Team	Apps	(Gls)
2001–2005	Criciúma	89	(6)
2005	Çaykur Rizespor	15	(1)
2006	Criciúma	28	(7)
2007–2008	São Caetano	49	(6)
2008–2009	Corinthians	42	(10)
2009	Al-Wasl	25	(1)
2010–2012	Grêmio	63	(14)
2012–2014	Corinthians	66	(7)
2014	→ Vasco da Gama (loan)	34	(10)
2015–2018	Grêmio	60	(9)
2019	Avaí	13	(0)
2020	Brasiliense	9	(3)

International career
2010	Brazil	1	(0)
- * Club domestic league appearances and goals

Douglas dos Santos (born 18 February 1982), simply known as Douglas, is a retired Brazilian professional footballer who played as an attacking midfielder.

== Career ==
Prior to being signed for Al Wasl for R$11m, Douglas was owned by two clubs; each owning 50% of his player card, the first club was Corinthians where he used to play before moving to Al Wasl, and the second was São Caetano. He played only half a season with Al Wasl in the 2009–10 season before moving back to Brazil to play for Grêmio. Douglas was first picked for the Brazil national team on 29 October 2010 to play a friendly match against Argentina.

On 27 October 2020, 38-year old Douglas announced his retirement from football. In February 2021, Douglas returned to Grêmio to play for their futsal team.

== Career statistics ==
Appearances and goals by club, season and competition
Club	Season	League			Cup (Note: Includes Copa do Brasil, Turkish Cup, Etisalat Emirates Cup.)		Continental		State League		Other		Total	
Club	Season	Division	Apps	Goals	Apps	Goals	Apps	Goals	Apps	Goals	Apps	Goals	Apps	Goals
Criciúma	2003	Série A	28	0	0	0	0	0	0	0	0	0	28	0
Criciúma	2004	Série A	20	2	0	0	0	0	0	0	0	0	20	2
Criciúma	Total		48	2	0	0	0	0	0	0	0	0	48	2
Rizespor	2005–06	Süper Lig	15	1	0	0	0	0	0	0	0	0	15	1
Corinthians	2008	Série B	33	9	0	0	0	0	0	0	0	0	33	9
Corinthians	2009	Série A	9	1	10	0	0	0	16	2	0	0	35	3
Corinthians	Total		42	10	10	0	0	0	16	2	0	0	68	12
Al Wasl	2009	UAE Pro-League	0	0	0	0	0	0	0	0	0	0	0	0
Grêmio	2010	Série A	30	6	9	2	2 (Note: Appearances in Copa Sudamericana)	0	11	0	0	0	52	8
Grêmio	2011	Série A	33	8	0	0	9	4	15	4	0	0	57	16
Grêmio	2012	Série A	0	0	0	0	0	0	3	1	0	0	3	1
Grêmio	Total		63	14	9	2	11	4	29	5	0	0	112	25
Corinthians	2012	Série A	35	6	0	0	5 (Note: Appearances in Copa Libertadores)	1	10	0	1 (Note: Appearance in 2012 FIFA Club World Cup)	0	51	7
Corinthians	2013	Série A	30	1	3	0	5	0	11	1	1 (Note: Appearance in Recopa Sudamericana)	0	50	2
Corinthians	2014	Série A	0	0	0	0	0	0	3	0	0	0	3	0
Corinthians	Total		65	7	3	0	10	1	24	1	2	0	104	9
Career total			233	34	22	2	21	5	69	8	2	0	347	49

== Honours ==
Criciúma

- Série B: 2002
- Campeonato Catarinense: 2005
- Série C: 2006

Corinthians

- Série B: 2008
- Campeonato Paulista: 2009, 2013
- Copa do Brasil: 2009
- Copa Libertadores: 2012
- FIFA Club World Cup: 2012
- Recopa Sudamericana: 2013

Grêmio

- Campeonato Gaúcho: 2010
- Copa do Brasil: 2016
- Copa Libertadores: 2017

Avaí

- Campeonato Catarinense: 2019
