= 2006–07 UAE Football League =

UAE Football League
- Season: 2006-07
- Champions: Al-Wasl
- AFC Champions League: Al-Wasl; Al-Wahda
- Matches: 132
- Goals: 411 (3.11 per match)
- Top goalscorer: (Brazil) Anderson Barbosa (Al Wasl)

Statistics of UAE Football League for the 2006–07 season.

== Overview ==
It was contested by 12 teams, and Al-Wasl won the league.

== Foreign players ==
Club	Player 1	Player 2	Player 3	Player 4	Former players
Al-Ahli (Dubai)	(Argentina) Alexis Castro	(Brazil) Gabriel Lima	(Bulgaria) Martin Kamburov	(Iran) Farhad Majidi	(Uruguay) Juan Martín Parodi
Al-Ahly (Fujairah)					
Al-Ain	(Cameroon) Franck Ongfiang	(Iraq) Hawar Mulla Mohammed	(Senegal) André Senghor		(Brazil) Dodô (Brazil) Kelly (Serbia) Nenad Jestrović
Al-Jazira	(Ivory Coast) Ibrahim Diaky	(Ivory Coast) Antonin Koutouan	(Togo) Mohamed Kader	(Togo) Chérif Touré Mamam	(Brazil) Fábio Giuntini (Colombia) Oscar Velazco (Zambia) Elijah Tana
Al-Nasr	(France) Jean-Louis Valois	(Iraq) Hussein Alaa Hussein	(Serbia) Nenad Jestrović	(Togo) Mickaël Dogbé	(Iran) Arash Borhani (Iran) Farhad Majidi
Al-Shaab	(Iran) Javad Kazemian	(Iran) Ali Samereh			
Al-Shabab	(Ghana) Prince Tagoe	(Iran) Iman Mobali	(Iran) Mehrdad Oladi		
Al-Wahda	(Angola) Maurito	(Ivory Coast) Éli Kroupi	(Mali) Mamadou Bagayoko	(Morocco) Nadir Lamyaghri	(Algeria) Karim Kerkar
Al-Wasl	(Brazil) Anderson Barbosa	(Brazil) Alexandre Oliveira		(Qatar) Mohammed Salem Al-Enazi	
Dubai	(Algeria) Brahim Arafat Mezouar	(France) Grégory Dufrennes	(Ghana) Massaudu Naddah	(Ivory Coast) Nicolas Esceth-N'Zi	(Brazil) Mário Sérgio
Emirates	(Iran) Reza Enayati	(Iran) Rasoul Khatibi	(Nigeria) Abass Lawal	(Ukraine) Oleksandr Grebenozhko	(Iran) Hossein Kaebi
Sharjah	(Brazil) Reinaldo	(Iran) Masoud Shojaei	(Morocco) Saïd Chiba		(Iran) Rasoul Khatibi

== League standings ==
Pos	Team	Pld	W	D	L	GF	GA	GD	Pts
1	Al Wasl	22	13	8	1	45	24	+21	47
2	Al Wahda	22	13	4	5	40	34	+6	43
3	Al Jazira	22	13	2	7	40	24	+16	41
4	Sharjah	22	9	5	8	37	33	+4	32
5	Al Shaab	22	9	4	9	40	37	+3	31
6	Al Shabab	22	9	4	9	37	34	+3	31
7	Al Ahli (Dubai)	22	10	0	12	33	34	−1	30
8	Al Nasr	22	7	7	8	30	32	−2	28
9	Al Ain	22	7	7	8	22	26	−4	28
10	Emirates	22	6	5	11	29	40	−11	23
11	Al Ahly (Fujairah)	22	5	4	13	27	41	−14	19
12	Dubai	22	4	4	14	31	52	−21	16

Source: rsssf.org

== Top goalscorers ==
Source: goalzz.com

19 goals

- (Brazil) Anderson Barbosa (Al Wasl)

17 goals

- (France) Grégory Dufrennes (Dubai Club)
- (Iran) Ali Samereh (Al-Shaab)

15 goals

- (United Arab Emirates) Saeed Al Kass (Sharjah)

14 goals

- (Serbia) Nenad Jestrović (Al-Nasr)

13 goals

- (Iran) Reza Enayati (Emirates Club)

12 goals

- (Iran) Rasoul Khatibi (Sharja, Emirates Club)

11 goals

- (Iran) Javad Kazemian (Al-Shaab)
- (United Arab Emirates) Faisal Khalil (Al-Ahli)

10 goals

- (Ghana) Prince Tagoe (Al-Shabab)
