= Ibrahim Kala =

Qatari association football player (born 1997)

Ibrahim Kala إبراهيم كلا
Personal information
- Full name: Ibrahim Nasser Kala
- Date of birth: 26 January 1997 (age 29)
- Place of birth: Qatar
- Positions: Right back; winger

Youth career
- –2017: Al-Arabi

Senior career*
Years	Team	Apps	(Gls)
2017–2025	Al-Arabi	71	(3)
2024–2025	→ Al-Khor (loan)	13	(1)
2025	Al Shahaniya	1	(0)
- * Club domestic league appearances and goals

Ibrahim Nasser Kala (Arabic:إبراهيم ناصر كلا; born 26 January 1997) is a Qatari footballer who plays as a right back or winger.

== Career ==
Kala started his career at Al-Arabi and is a product of the Al-Arabi's youth system. On 16 September 2017, Ibrahim Nasser made his professional debut for Al-Arabi against Al-Sailiya in the Pro League, replacing Ahmad Khalfan.
