= Fadel Ahmad =

Emirati footballer (born 1985)

Personal information
- Full name: Fadel Ahmad
- Date of birth: January 3, 1985 (age 41)
- Place of birth: UAE
- Height: 1.75 m (5 ft 9 in)
- Position: Winger

Youth career
- Al Ain Club

Senior career*
| Years | Team | Apps | (Gls) |
| – 2008 | Al Ain Club | | |
| 2008–2009 | → Al Wasl FC (loan) | | |
| 2009–2012 | Al Wasl FC | | |
| 2012–2017 | Dubai Club | | |
- * Club domestic league appearances and goals as of 25/8/2010 ‡ National team caps and goals as of 1/5/2010

Fadel Ahmad (Arabic: فاضل أحمد) is a UAE footballer. He currently plays as a left winger.

Fadel has started his career in Al Ain Club, But in the 2007-08 season he was loaned to Al Wasl FC where he was able to shine and prove himself to secure a full transfer deal with Al Wasl in the next season.

Fadel paid a spectacular effort in the 2009-10 season where he played vital role in Al Wasl FC success in winning the 2009-10 Gulf Club Champions Cup. He was also selected as the tournament's best player.
