= 2012–13 UAE League Cup =

2012–13 Etisalat Emirates Cup
Tournament details
- Country: United Arab Emirates
- Teams: 14

Final positions
- Champions: Ajman
- Runners-up: Al Jazira

Tournament statistics
- Matches played: 42
- Goals scored: 137 (3.26 per match)
- Top goal scorer: Founéké Sy (10 goals)

The 2012–13 UAE League Cup, commonly known as the Etisalat Emirates Cup for sponsorship reasons, is the fifth season of the league cup competition for teams in the UAE Pro-League. It started on 18 September 2012 and concluded with the final on 14 May 2013. Al Ahli were the defending champions, who had won their first title the previous season.

== Format ==
The number of teams involved in the competition has increased this year from 12 to 14, in line with the league. As a result, there are now 3 instead of 2 groups in the initial group stage - two of 5 teams and one of 4 teams. The three teams who finish top of each group will advance automatically to the semi-finals, along with one runner-up.

== Group stage ==
=== Group A ===
Pos	Team	Pld	W	D	L	GF	GA	GD	Pts
1	Al-Wahda	8	6	1	1	18	7	+11	19
2	Al Ain	8	5	3	0	13	5	+8	18
3	Al Nasr	8	2	3	3	13	10	+3	9
4	Dubai	8	2	1	5	11	16	−5	7
5	Al-Shaab	8	0	2	6	6	23	−17	2

Updated to match(es) played on 17 March 2013. Source: Soccerway
Rules for classification: 1) points; 2) goal difference; 3) number of goals scored.
18 September 2012

Al-Shaab	0–2	Dubai

19 September 2012

Al Nasr	0–3	Al Wahda

9 October 2012

Dubai	2–4	Al Ain

10 October 2012

Al Wahda	6–1	Al-Shaab

14 October 2012

Al Ain	0–0	Al Wahda

15 October 2012

Al-Shaab	1–1	Al Nasr

12 November 2012

Al Wahda	2–1	Dubai

13 November 2012

Al Nasr	0–0	Al Ain

27 December 2012

Dubai	0–4	Al Nasr

28 December 2012

Al Ain	2–0	Al-Shaab

3 January 2013

Al Wahda	2–1	Al Nasr

4 January 2013

Dubai	1–1	Al-Shaab

10 January 2013

Al Ain	2–1	Dubai

10 January 2013

Al-Shaab	1–2	Al-Wahda

16 January 2013

Al Nasr	6–1	Al-Shaab

17 January 2013

Al-Wahda	0–1	Al Ain

1 February 2013

Al Ain	1–1	Al Nasr

1 February 2013

Al-Wahda	3–2	Dubai

17 March 2013

Al-Shaab	1–3	Al Ain

17 March 2013

Al Nasr	0–2	Dubai

Source: Soccerway

=== Group B ===
Pos	Team	Pld	W	D	L	GF	GA	GD	Pts
1	Al Jazira	8	4	3	1	23	15	+8	15
2	Al Wasl	8	4	0	4	13	18	−5	12
3	Al Dhafra	8	3	2	3	16	14	+2	11
4	Bani Yas	8	3	1	4	14	14	0	10
5	Al Ittihad Kalba	8	2	2	4	10	15	−5	8

Updated to match(es) played on 17 March 2013. Source: Soccerway
Rules for classification: 1) points; 2) goal difference; 3) number of goals scored.
18 September 2012

Al Ittihad Kalba	2–4	Al Wasl

19 September 2012

Al Dhafra	1–2	Bani Yas

9 October 2012

Bani Yas	2–3	Al Jazira

10 October 2012

Al Wasl	0–4	Al Dhafra

14 October 2012

Al Dhafra	1–0	Al Ittihad Kalba

15 October 2012

Al Jazira	2–3	Al Wasl

13 November 2012

Al Wasl	1–0	Bani Yas

13 November 2012

Al Ittihad Kalba	2–2	Al Jazira

27 December 2012

Bani Yas	2–1	Al Ittihad Kalba

28 December 2012

Al Jazira	1–0	Al Dhafra

3 January 2013

Al Wasl	0–1	Al Ittihad Kalba

4 January 2013

Bani Yas	4–2	Al Dhafra

10 January 2013

Al Dhafra	3–2	Al Wasl

10 January 2013

Al Jazira	2–2	Bani Yas

16 January 2013

Al Wasl	1–5	Al Jazira

17 January 2013

Al Ittihad Kalba	1–1	Al Dhafra

2 February 2013

Al Jazira	4–1	Al Ittihad Kalba

2 February 2013

Bani Yas	1–2	Al Wasl

17 March 2013

Al Dhafra	4–4	Al JaziraKalba

17 March 2013

Al Ittihad Kalba	2–1	Bani Yas

Source: Soccerway

=== Group C ===
Pos	Team	Pld	W	D	L	GF	GA	GD	Pts
1	Al Shabab	6	4	2	0	12	5	+7	14
2	Ajman	6	4	0	2	16	9	+7	12
3	Al Ahli	6	1	2	3	4	9	−5	5
4	Dibba Al Fujairah	6	1	0	5	7	16	−9	3

Updated to match(es) played on 17 March 2013. Source: Soccerway
Rules for classification: 1) points; 2) goal difference; 3) number of goals scored.
18 September 2012

Al Shabab	1–1	Al Ahli

19 September 2012

Ajman	6–1	Dibba Al Fujairah

14 October 2012

Al Ahli	1–2	Ajman

15 October 2012

Dibba Al Fujairah	0–3	Al Shabab

12 November 2012

Al Shabab	3–2	Ajman

13 November 2012

Dibba Al Fujairah	3–0	Al Ahli

3 January 2013

Dibba Al Fujairah	1–3	Ajman

4 January 2013

Al Ahli	0–0	Al Shabab

16 January 2013

Ajman	2–0	Al Ahli

17 January 2013

Al Shabab	2–1	Dibba Al Fujairah

17 January 2013

Ajman	1–3	Al Shabab

17 January 2013

Al Ahli	2–1	Dibba Al Fujairah

Source: Soccerway

== Semi-finals ==
25 March 2013
17:30

Al Wahda	1 – 2	Al Jazira

25 March 2013
17:30

Al Shabab	1 – 2	Ajman

== Final ==
14 May 2013
17:40

Ajman	2 – 1	Al Jazira

Za'abeel Stadium, Dubai

Etisalat Emirates Cup
2012–13 winners

1st title
