= UFL Top Scorer =

Football award

The UAE Football League (UFL) Top Scorer is awarded by the Sheikh Majid Bin Mohammed Football Season Award, to the top scoring Emarati player of the season.

Year	Footballer	Goals	Club	Nationality
2009	Mohamed Omer	13	Al-Nasr	United Arab Emirates

== Wins By Club ==
#	Club	Winners
1	Al-Nasr	1
