= El Gara =

Coordinates: 33.1119°N 7.4058°W

El Gara: الكارة (Arabic)
- Town
- Interactive map of El Gara
- Country: Morocco
- Region: Casablanca-Settat
- Province: Berrechid

Population (2024)
  - Total: 20,467
- Time zone: UTC+0 (GMT)

El Gara (Arabic: الكارة, romanized: al-gāra) is a town in Berrechid Province, Casablanca-Settat, Morocco. According to the 2024 Moroccan census it recorded a population of 20,467.

== Notable people from El Gara ==
- Soufiane Alloudi
