= 2007–08 UAE Football League =

Statistics of UAE Football League for the 2007–08 season.

== Overview ==
It was contested by 12 teams, and Al-Shabab (United Arab Emirates) won the championship.

== Foreign players ==
Club	Player 1	Player 2	Player 3	Player 4	Former players
Al-Ahli	(Argentina) Jorge Artigas	(Brazil) Clederson	(Brazil) Marcos Assunção	(Iran) Milad Meydavoudi	
Al-Ain	(Brazil) Pedrinho	(The Gambia) Ousman Jallow	(Iraq) Nashat Akram	(Morocco) Soufiane Alloudi	(Nigeria) Obiora Odita
Al-Dhafra	(Ghana) Abdul Nafiu Idrissu	(Iran) Siavash Akbarpour	(Morocco) Amin Erbati		(Hungary) Róbert Waltner
Al-Jazira	(Angola) António Lebo Lebo	(Ivory Coast) Antonin Koutouan	(Mali) Mamadou Diallo	(Netherlands) Phillip Cocu	(Ivory Coast) Bonaventure Kalou
Al-Nasr	(Brazil) Luiz Carlos	(Brazil) Renato Abreu			(Brazil) Roger (Ivory Coast) Kandia Traoré (Togo) Mickaël Dogbé
Al-Shaab	(Iran) Ali Samereh	(Iran) Mehrzad Madanchi			(Iran) Maysam Baou
Al-Shabab	(Colombia) David Ferreira	(Iran) Iman Mobali	(Iran) Javad Kazemian	(Iran) Mehrdad Oladi	(Tunisia) Adel Chedli
Al-Wahda	(Brazil) Leonardo Silva	(Brazil) Pinga	(Brazil) Sidney Moraes	(Morocco) Nadir Lamyaghri	(Brazil) Alecsandro (Brazil) Josiel (Brazil) Réver (Croatia) Ahmad Sharbini
Al-Wasl	(Brazil) Alexandre Oliveira	(Brazil) Rogerinho	(Brazil) Weslley	(Qatar) Mohammed Salem Al-Enazi	(Brazil) André Dias
Emirates	(Brazil) Everton Izidoro	(Iran) Mehdi Rajabzadeh	(Iran) Rasoul Khatibi	(Iran) Reza Enayati	(Ukraine) Oleksandr Grebenozhko
Hatta	(Brazil) Diego Perão	(Democratic Republic of the Congo) Ilongo Ngasanya	(France) Hassan Ahamada		
Sharjah	(Brazil) Anderson Barbosa	(Cameroon) Franck Ongfiang	(Iran) Masoud Shojaei	(Iraq) Qusay Munir	

== League standings ==
Pos	Team	Pld	W	D	L	GF	GA	GD	Pts
1	Al Shabab	22	12	6	4	44	30	+14	42
2	Al Jazira	22	11	6	5	46	31	+15	39
3	Al Ahli	22	10	7	5	47	27	+20	37
4	Sharjah	22	9	6	7	35	35	0	33
5	Al Shaab	22	9	6	7	39	44	−5	33
6	Al Ain	22	9	5	8	41	36	+5	32
7	Al Wasl	22	8	6	8	39	37	+2	30
8	Al Wahda	22	8	6	8	42	42	0	30
9	Al Nasr	22	7	7	8	37	39	−2	28
10	Al Dhafra	22	7	4	11	33	41	−8	25
11	Emirates	22	3	7	12	36	54	−18	16
12	Hatta	22	4	4	14	23	46	−23	16

Source: rsssf.org

== Top goalscorers ==
Source: goalzz.com

16 goals

- (Brazil) Anderson Barbosa (Sharjah)
- (United Arab Emirates) Faisal Khalil (Al-Ahli)

15 goals

- (Iran) Mehrzad Madanchi (Al-Shaab)

14 goals

- (Brazil) André Dias (Al Wasl)
- (Iran) Rasoul Khatibi (Emirates Club)

12 goals

- (Iran) Ali Samereh (Al-Shaab)
- (Iran) Reza Enayati (Emirates Club)
- (Ivory Coast) Antonin Koutouan (Al-Jazira)

11 goals

- (The Gambia) Ousman Jallow (Al Ain)

10 goals

- (Brazil) Clederson (Al-Ahli)
- (Brazil) Renato Abreu (Al-Nasr)
