= 2008–09 Etisalat Emirates Cup =

2009–10 Etisalat Cup
Etisalat Emirates Cup

Tournament details
- Country: United Arab Emirates
- Teams: 12

Final positions
- Champions: Al Ain
- Runners-up: Al Wahda

Tournament statistics
- Matches played: 41
- Goals scored: 116 (2.83 per match)
- Top goal scorer(s): (Brazil) Fernando Baiano (7 goals)

The 2008–09 Etisalat Emirates Cup was the first staging of the Etisalat Emirates Cup, running between October 10, 2008 and April 3, 2009. The competition was won by Al Ain defeating Al Wahda in the final 1–0. 12 clubs were drawn into 3 groups of 4 teams. The winners and the best runner-up qualified for the semi-final stage.

== Group stage ==
=== Group A ===
Team	Pld	W	D	L	GF	GA	GD	Pts
Al Wahda	6	4	2	0	8	4	+4	14
Al-Shabab	6	2	3	1	12	8	+4	9
Sharjah	6	1	2	3	4	8	−4	5
Al-Dhafra	6	0	3	3	4	8	−4	3

October 10, 2008

Al Dhafra	1–1	Sharjah

October 11, 2008

Al Shabab	3–3	Al Wahda

October 17, 2008

Sharjah	1–4	Al Shabab

October 18, 2008

Al Wahda	1–0	Al Dhafra

January 9, 2009

Al Dhafra	1–1	Al Shabab

Sharjah	0–1	Al Wahda

January 13, 2009

Al Shabab	3–1	Al Dhafra

Al Wahda	1–0	Sharjah

January 18, 2009

Al Wahda	0–0	Al Shabab

January 19, 2009

Sharjah	0–0	Al Dhafra

January 23, 2009

Al Shabab	1–2	Sharjah

Al Dhafra	1–2	Al Wahda

=== Group B ===
Team	Pld	W	D	L	GF	GA	GD	Pts
Al-Jazira	6	5	0	1	19	6	+13	15
Al Wasl	6	2	2	2	9	14	−5	8
Al Khaleej Club	6	1	2	3	10	11	−1	5
Al-Shaab	6	1	2	3	5	12	−7	5

October 10, 2008

Khaleej	2–3	Al-Jazira Club

October 11, 2008

Al Shaab	1–1	Al Wasl

October 17, 2008

Al-Jazira Club	5–0	Al Shaab

October 18, 2008

Al Wasl	3–3	Khaleej

January 7, 2009

Al-Jazira Club	4–0	Al Wasl

January 9, 2009

Khaleej	2–0	Al Shaab

January 13, 2009

Al Wasl	1–4	Al-Jazira Club

January 14, 2009

Al Shaab	1–1	Khaleej

January 18, 2009

Al Wasl	2–1	Al Shaab

January 19, 2009

Al-Jazira Club	2–1	Khaleej

January 23, 2009

Khaleej	1–2	Al Wasl

Al Shaab	2–1	Al-Jazira Club

=== Group C ===
Team	Pld	W	D	L	GF	GA	GD	Pts
Al Ain	6	4	1	1	9	4	+5	13
Al-Ahli	6	3	1	2	13	10	+3	10
Al-Nasr	6	2	0	4	6	6	0	6
Ajman	6	2	0	4	5	13	−8	6

Source: goalzz.com
October 10, 2008

Al Nasr	2–0	Al Ahli

October 11, 2008

Al Ain	1–0	Ajman

October 17, 2008

Ajman	1–0	Al Nasr

October 18, 2008

Al Ahli	1–1	Al Ain

January 9, 2009

Al Ahli	5–3	Ajman

Al Nasr	0–1	Al Ain

January 13, 2009

Ajman	0–4	Al Ahli

Al Ain	2–1	Al Nasr

January 18, 2009

Ajman	0–3	Al Ain

January 19, 2009

Al Ahli	1–3	Al Nasr

January 24, 2009

Al Ain	1–2	Al Ahli

Al Nasr	0–1	Ajman

== Semi-finals ==
Kickoff times are in UAE Time (UTC+4).

=== 1st Legs ===
22 March 2009
17:55

Al-Ahli	1–3	Al Wahda
Jaber 77'	Report	23' Ameen; 68' Hashim; 87' Pinga

Al-Rashid Stadium, Dubai

22 March 2009
20:30

Al-Jazira	1–4	Al Ain
Baiano 48'	Report	10', 30' (45), pen.' André Dias; 46' Hilal

Mohammad bin Zayed Stadium, Abu Dhabi
Referee: Mohammad Abdullah Hassan

=== 2nd Legs ===
27 March 2009
17:55

Al-Wahda	0–1	Al-Ahli
Baré 22'	Report

Al-Nahyan Stadium, Abu Dhabi
Referee: Abdulwahid Qhater

27 March 2009
20:30

Al Ain	1–0	Al-Jazira
70' André Dias	Report

Sheikh Khalifa International Stadium, Al Ain
Referee: Mohammed Al Junaibi

== Final ==
3 April 2009
19:30 (UTC+4)

Al Ain	1–0	Al-Wahda
Shehab 75'	Report

Mohammad bin Zayed Stadium, Abu Dhabi
Referee: Mohammad Abdullah Hassan

Etisalat Emirates Cup
2008–09 Winners

1st title
