= 2011–12 UAE League Cup =

2011–12 Etisalat Emirates Cup
Tournament details
- Country: United Arab Emirates
- Teams: 12

Final positions
- Champions: Al Ahli
- Runners-up: Al-Shabbab

Tournament statistics
- Matches played: 12
- Goals scored: 39 (3.25 per match)

The 2011–12 Etisalat Emirates Cup is the fourth season of the league cup competition for teams in the UAE Pro-League.

== Group stage ==
=== Group A ===
Team	Pld	W	D	L	GF	GA	GD	Pts
Al Jazira	10	7	1	2	28	13	+15	22
Al Wasl	10	6	0	4	18	18	0	18
Al Ain	10	5	2	3	17	13	+4	17
Dubai	10	5	1	4	18	13	+5	16
Al Wahda	10	3	0	7	13	20	−7	9
Emirates	10	1	2	7	7	24	−17	5

Source: UAEProLeague
2011-09-15

Al Jazira	4–3	Al Wasl

2011-09-16

Emirates	1–2	Dubai

Al Ain	1–2	Al Wahda

2011-09-22

Al Wasl	3–0	Emirates

2011-09-23

Al Wahda	1–2	Al Jazira

Dubai	1–2	Al Ain

2011-09-30

Al Jazira	1–0	Dubai

Al Wasl	3–0	Al Wahda

2011-10-01

Emirates	1–1	Al Ain

2011-10-07

Al Ain	4–2	Al Jazira

2011-10-08

Dubai	5–0	Al Wasl

Al Wahda	2–3	Emirates

2011-11-12

Al Wasl	1–0	Al Ain

Al Jazira	6–0	Emirates

2011-11-13

Al Wahda	3–2	Dubai

2011-11-18

Dubai	2–1	Al Wahda

2011-11-19

Emirates	1–1	Al Jazira

Al Ain	1–0	Al Wasl

2012-01-27

Emirates	0–2	Al Wahda

Al Jazira	4–0	Al Ain

2012-01-28

Al Wasl	0–3	Dubai

2012-02-03

Al Wahda	1–2	Al Wasl

Al Ain	3–0	Emirates

Dubai	0–4	Al Jazira

2012-02-23

Emirates	1–2	Al Wasl

Al Ain	1–1	Dubai

2012-02-25

Al Jazira	1–0	Al Wahda

2012-03-02

Al Wahda	1–4	Al Ain

Al Wasl	4–3	Al Jazira

Dubai	2–0	Emirates

=== Group B ===
Team	Pld	W	D	L	GF	GA	GD	Pts
Al Shabab	9	5	2	2	20	9	+11	17
Al Ahli	10	6	2	2	24	16	+8	20
Bani Yas	10	4	2	4	14	15	−1	14
Ajman	10	3	4	3	13	13	0	13
Al Nasr	10	3	3	4	14	15	−1	12
Al Sharjah	10	0	3	7	7	24	−17	3

Source: UAEProLeague
2011-09-15

Ajman	3–1	Al Ahli

Al Shabab	4–1	Bani Yas

2011-09-16

Al Sharjah	1–1	Al Nasr

2011-09-22

Bani Yas	1–1	Ajman

Al Ahli	3–3	Al Sharjah

Al Nasr	0–2	Al Shabab

2011-10-01

Ajman	3–2	Al Sharjah

Bani Yas	0–1	Al Nasr

Al Shabab	1–3	Al Ahli

2011-10-07

Al Nasr	2–3	Ajman

Al Sharjah	0–3	Al Shabab

2011-10-08

Al Ahli	3–1	Bani Yas

2011-11-12

Al Shabab	1–0	Ajman

2011-11-13

Al Nasr	2–3	Al Ahli

Bani Yas	4–0	Al Sharjah

2011-11-18

Ajman	1–1	Al Shabab

Al Ahli	2–3	Al Nasr

2011-11-19

Al Sharjah	0–1	Bani Yas

2012-01-27

Ajman	1–1	Al Nasr

2012-01-28

Al Shabab	3–0	Al Sharjah

Bani Yas	1–1	Al Ahli

2012-02-02

Al Sharjah	0–0	Ajman

Al Ahli	2–1	Al Shabab

Al Nasr	1–2	Bani Yas

2012-02-24

Al Shabab	1–1	Al Nasr

Al Sharjah	1–4	Al Ahli

Ajman	1–2	Bani Yas

2012-03-01

Al Nasr	2–0	Al Sharjah

Al Ahli	2–0	Ajman

Bani Yas	1–3	Al Shabab

== Semi-finals ==
11 March 2012
14:45

Al Jazira	0 – 4	Al Shabab

Mohammed Bin Zayed Stadium, Abu Dhabi
11 March 2012
17:30

Al Ahli	1 – 0	Al Wasl

Rashed Stadium, Dubai

== Final ==
19 May 2012

Al Shabab	1 – 1 (a.e.t.)	Al Ahli
Penalties
	3 – 5

Etisalat Emirates Cup
2011–12 winners

1st title
