= 2009–10 Etisalat Emirates Cup =

2009–10 Etisalat Cup
Etisalat Emirates Cup

Tournament details
- Country: United Arab Emirates
- Teams: 12

Final positions
- Champions: Al-Jazira
- Runners-up: Ajman Club

Tournament statistics
- Matches played: 41
- Goals scored: 124 (3.02 per match)
- Top goal scorer(s): (Ivory Coast) Boris Landry Kabi (7 goals)

The 2009–10 Etisalat Emirates Cup was the second staging of the Etisalat Emirates Cup. The competition started on October 8, 2009 and concluded on May 21, 2009.

== Round One Groups ==
12 clubs were drawn into 3 groups of 4 teams. The winners and the best runners-up will qualify for the semifinals.

Group A	Group B	Group C
Al-Wahda; Al-Sharjah; Al Dhafra; Al-Ahli	Al-Shabbab ACD; Al-Ain; Ajman Club; Bani Yas Club	Al-Wasl; Al-Jazira Club; Emirates Club; Al-Nasr

== Standings and results ==
=== Group A ===
Pos	Team	Pld	W	D	L	GF	GA	GD	Pts	WAH	SHR	ALI	DHA
1	Al-Wahda	6	4	1	1	12	7	+5	13		0–2	2–2	3–0
2	Al Sharjah	6	2	3	1	7	6	+1	9	0–2		2–2	1–1
3	Al Ahli	6	1	4	1	8	8	0	7	0–1	1–1		2–1
4	Al-Dhafra	6	0	2	4	6	12	−6	2	3–4	0–1	1–1	

Source: Standings and Matches
Rules for classification: 1) points; 2) goal difference; 3) number of goals scored.

=== Group B ===
Pos	Team	Pld	W	D	L	GF	GA	GD	Pts	AIN	AJM	YAS	SHA
1	Al Ain	6	4	1	1	9	8	+1	13		3–1	1–1	1–0
2	Ajman	6	3	1	2	14	9	+5	10	4–0		3–1	5–3
3	Baniyas	6	3	1	2	10	5	+5	10	0–1	2–1		1–0
4	Al Shabab	6	0	1	5	6	15	−9	1	2–3	0–0	1–5	

Source: Standings and Matches
Rules for classification: 1) points; 2) goal difference; 3) number of goals scored.

=== Group C ===
Pos	Team	Pld	W	D	L	GF	GA	GD	Pts	JAZ	NAS	EMI	WAS
1	Al Jazira	6	4	2	0	12	4	+8	14		1–1	4–1	2–1
2	Al-Nasr	6	1	4	1	11	9	+2	7	1–1		5–2	2–2
3	Emirates Club	6	2	0	4	6	15	−9	6	0–3	1–0		0–2
4	Al Wasl	6	1	2	3	8	9	−1	5	0–1	2–2	1–2	

Source: Standings and Matches
Rules for classification: 1) points; 2) goal difference; 3) number of goals scored.

== Semi-finals ==
=== 1st Legs ===
2010-03-04

Al Wahda	1 - 1	Al-Jazira

2010-03-04

Ajman Club	1 - 1	Al Ain

=== 2nd Legs ===
2010-03-27

Al-Jazira	3 - 0	Al-Wahda

2010-03-27

Al Ain	3 - 3	Ajman Club

== Final ==
21 May 2010
19:40 (GMT+4)

Ajman	0 - 2	Al Jazira
	Report	83' Mabkhout; 94' Bargash

Al-Maktoum Stadium, Dubai
Attendance: 8,000
Referee: Mohammed Al Junaibi

Etisalat Emirates Cup
2009–10 Winners

1st title
