= Saeed Al Kass =

Emirati footballer (born 1976)

Saeed Al-Kass
Personal information
- Full name: Saeed Hassan Salem Al-Kass
- Date of birth: 20 February 1976 (age 50)
- Place of birth: Dibba Al-Hisn, United Arab Emirates
- Height: 1.78 m (5 ft 10 in)
- Position: Striker

Youth career
- Dibba Al-Hisn Sports Club

Senior career*
Years	Team	Apps	(Gls)
1994–1998	Dibba Al Hisn	72	(29)
1998–2008	Sharjah	207	(74)
2008–2011	Al Wasl	48	(11)
2011–2012	Sharjah	18	(1)
2012–2014	Ajman	41	(3)

International career^{‡}
1998–2011	United Arab Emirates	60	(15)
- * Club domestic league appearances and goals as of 10/12/2011 ‡ National team caps and goals as of 1/1/2011

Saeed Hassan Salem Al-Kass (Arabic: سَعِيد حَسَن سَالِم الْكَاس) is a retired Emirati footballer who last played as a striker for Ajman Club.

Saeed started his career in Dibba Al-Hisn Sports Club in the UAE Second Division League. Since his beginning he was successful in attracting the eyes of the First Division Clubs Scouts. He was signed by Sharjah FC in 1998 which helped him secure a place in the UAE national squad. He is known for scoring two goals against Japan and Qatar during the 2007 AFC Asian Cup.

He was transferred to Al Wasl FC from Sharjah FC during the Winter 2008 transfer window.

The 2009-10 season was particularly special. During the 2009-10 Gulf Club Champions Cup, Saeed helped his team Al Wasl FC win the title. Saeed himself won the Top Scorer title with 6 goals. He returned to Sharjah FC after three successful seasons with Al Wasl. In 2012, he moved to Ajman.

== Personal life ==
Saeed has a son named Mayed and he has a Bachelor of Science degree in electronic
