= Luis Fernández (Costa Rican footballer) =

Costa Rican footballer (born 1960)

Luis Neco Fernández Gonzalez
Personal information
- Date of birth: 2 April 1960 (age 66)
- Place of birth: San José, Costa Rica
- Position: Forward

International career
Years	Team	Apps	(Gls)
- Costa Rica

Luis Fernández (born 2 April 1960) is a Costa Rican former footballer. He competed in the men's tournament at the 1980 Summer Olympics, where his team tied for 13th place.
