= Reinaldo (footballer, born February 1980) =

Brazilian footballer

Personal information
- Full name: Reinaldo José da Silva
- Date of birth: 24 February 1980 (age 46)
- Place of birth: Patos de Minas, Brazil
- Height: 1.82 m (6 ft 0 in)
- Position: Striker

Team information
- Current team: Saipa F.C.
- Number: 9

Youth career
- 1998–1999: Atlético Mineiro

Senior career*
Years	Team	Apps	(Gls)
1999–2002	Atlético Mineiro		
2002	Helsingborgs IF		
2002–2004	Atlético Mineiro		
2005	Vasco		
2005	Santa Cruz		
2006	Grêmio	1	(0)
2006	Pumas	16	(1)
2007	Ceará		
2008	Paysandu		
2009	Remo		
2009	Santa Cruz		
2010	Mamoré		
2010	Paysandu	2	(0)
2011	CRAC		
2011	Ipatinga	2	(0)
2012	Pelotas		
2013–	Mamoré		
- * Club domestic league appearances and goals

Reinaldo José da Silva or simply Reinaldo (born 24 February 1980), in Patos de Minas, is a Brazilian striker. He currently plays as a forward for Mamoré.

== Career ==
He had previously played for Atlético Mineiro and Vasco da Gama in his native country, he has also played for Helsingborgs IF in Sweden. He became the Campeonato Brasileiro Série B 2005's top scorer with 16 goals.

Reinaldo joined the Mexican side Pumas UNAM, a Mexico City team commonly known as the Pumas for the 2006 season from Grêmio. He came with the idea of becoming a consistent goal scorer in Mexico.

== Honours ==
=== Individual ===
- Brazilian 2nd Division League Top Scorer: 2005
