= Anderson Barbosa =

Brazilian footballer (born 1974)

Personal information
- Full name: Anderson de Carvalho Barbosa
- Date of birth: 1 September 1974 (age 52)

Senior career*
Years	Team	Apps	(Gls)
1994	Gama		
1994	→ Criciúma (loan)	7	(0)
1995–1996	Fluminense	21	(2)
1997	Gama		
1998–2001	Vila Nova	32	(13)
1999	→ Internacional (loan)	10	(0)
2001–2002	Gama		
2002–2006	Sharjah FC		
2004–2005	→ Al-Arabi SC (loan)		
2005–2006	→ Al-Shamal SC (loan)		
2006–2007	→ Al Wasl F.C. (loan)		
2007–2009	Sharjah FC		
2009–2010	Khor Fakkan Club		
2011–2012	Al Shahaniya SC		
- * Club domestic league appearances and goals

Anderson de Carvalho Barbosa (born 1 September 1974), commonly known as Anderson Barbosa, is a Brazilian striker who currently plays at Sociedade Esportiva do Gama.

== Club career ==
Anderson previously played Gama, Fluminense, Internacional and Criciúma in the Campeonato Brasileiro Série A. He also spent a season with the UAE Giants Al Wasl FC and was able to win the double with the club and get the top scorer trophy. He is the only UAE League player who was top scorer for four consecutive seasons. Anderson is the player with the highest number of goals of all time in the UAE, including foreigner and local player, summing up a total of 160 goals, of which 99 were scored in the UAE League. Anderson has played in the UAE since 2003 when he was transferred to Sharjah Sports Club.

== Club career statistics ==
As of 1 January 2023

Club	Season	League			National Cup		League Cup		GCC Champions League		AFC Champions League		Total	
Club	Season	Division	Apps	Goals	Apps	Goals	Apps	Goals	Apps	Goals	Apps	Goals	Apps	Goals
Criciúma	1994	Série A	7	0									7	0
Gama	1994	Série A					22	17 (Note: Goals in Campeonato Brasiliense)					22	17
Gama	2001	Série A	27	6			0	0						
Gama	2002	Série A	18	2	2	0							20	2
Gama	1997	Série B		3			13	7						
Gama	2003	Série B	1	0			0	0						0
Total				11										
Fluminense	1995	Série A	13	2				1 (Note: Goals in Campeonato Carioca)					13	3
Fluminense	1996	Série A	8	0				0					8	0
Internacional	1999	Série A	10	0									10	0
Vila Nova	1998	Série B	13	4	5	2		20 (Note: Goals in Campeonato Goiano)						
Vila Nova	1999	Série B	5	3	4	2		20	+3 (Note: Appearances in Copa Centro-Oeste)	6				31
Vila Nova	2000	Série B	14	6	2	0								
Vila Nova	2001	Série B	0	0	2	2								
Vila Nova	Total		32	13	13	6								
Sharjah FC	2002–03	UAE Pro League		6		4								
Sharjah FC	2003–04	UAE Pro League		4		2						5		
Sharjah FC	2004–05	UAE Pro League		23		0								
Sharjah FC	2005–06	UAE Pro League		20		8								
Sharjah FC	2007–08	UAE Pro League		16		1				1				
Sharjah FC	2008–09	UAE Pro League	22	12		5		1 (Note: Goals in UAE League Cup)				2		20
total				81		20				1		7		
Al Wasl F.C.	2006–07	UAE Pro League		18		2								20
total				18		2								20
Al-Arabi SC (Qatar)	2004–05	Qatar Stars League	0	0	4 (Note: Appearances in Emir of Qatar Cup)	2	0	0	0	0	0	0	4	2
Al-Arabi SC (Qatar)	Total		0	0	4	2	0	0	0	0	0	0	4	2
Al-Shamal SC	2005–06	Qatar Stars League	0	0	1	1	0	0	0	0	0	0	1	1
Al-Shamal SC	Total		0	0	1	1	0	0	0	0	0	0	1	1
Al Shahaniya SC	2011–12	Qatar Stars League	0	0	0	0	3 (Note: Appearances in Sheikh Jassim Cup)	0	0	0	0	0	3	0
Al Shahaniya SC	Total		0	0	0	0	3	0	0	0	0	0	3	0
Khor Fakkan Club	2009–10	UAE First Division League		5		4		10						19
Khor Fakkan Club	Total			5		4		10						19
Career total				130						1		7		

== Individual ==
- Campeonato Brasiliense top scorer: 1994 (17 goals)
- Campeonato Goiano top scorer: 1998 (20 goals), 1999 (20 goals).
- UAE President's Cup top scorer: 2005/2006 (8 goals).
- UAE Pro League top scorer: 2004/2005 (23 goals) , 2005/2006 (20 goals), 2006/2007 (18 goals), 2007/2008 (16 goals).
