= Nasser Khamis =

Emirati footballer

Personal information
- Full name: Nasser Khamis Abdullah Hassan
- Date of birth: September 19, 1980 (age 46)
- Place of birth: UAE
- Height: 1.74 m (5 ft 8 1/2 in)
- Position: Striker

Youth career
- 2004–2007: Al-Ain

Senior career*
Years	Team	Apps	(Gls)
2007–2010	Al-Ain		
2009	→ Ajman (loan)		
2010–2011	Dubai		
2011–2013	Al-Shaab		
2013–2015	Hatta		
2015–2016	Al Urooba		
2016–2017	Al-Dhaid		
2017–2018	Masfut		

International career
2002–2008	UAE	3	(0)
- * Club domestic league appearances and goals

Nasser Khamis Abdullah Hassan is an Emirati footballer who played as a striker.
