= Tariq Hassan =

Emirati footballer (born 1983)

Personal information
- Full name: Tariq Hassan
- Date of birth: 18 March 1983 (age 43)
- Place of birth: Dubai, UAE
- Height: 1.73 m (5 ft 8 in)
- Position: Winger

Senior career*
Years	Team	Apps	(Gls)
2003– 2014	Al Wasl FC		
2014–2016	Al-Arabi		

International career^{‡}
2003–2008	UAE National Team		
- * Club domestic league appearances and goals as of 25/8/2010 (UTC) ‡ National team caps and goals as of 25/8/2010 (UTC)

Tareq Hassan (Arabic: طارق حسن) is a UAE footballer. He currently plays for Al-Arabi.

Hassan is one of Al Wasl Club's Academy graduates. He has played in nearly all the different positions on the football pitch, and currently plays as a left back.

Hassan has been chosen as a member of the UAE National Team several times and in many age group teams.
