= Ahmad Khalfan =

Qatari footballer (born 1991)

Personal information
- Full name: Ahmad Saleh Khalfan
- Date of birth: 2 April 1991 (age 35)
- Place of birth: Qatar
- Height: 1.78 m (5 ft 10 in)
- Position: Midfielder

Senior career*
Years	Team	Apps	(Gls)
2011–2019	Al Arabi	97	(5)
2020–2021	Al-Kharaitiyat	10	(0)
- * Club domestic league appearances and goals

Ahmed Khalfan (Arabic: أحمد خلفان) (born 2 April 1991) is a Qatari footballer who plays as a midfielder.
