= Waleed Murad =

Emirati footballer (1981-2017)

Personal information
- Date of birth: 1981
- Date of death: 25 November 2017 (aged 35-36)
- Position: Forward

Senior career*
Years	Team	Apps	(Gls)
1999–2008	Al-Nasr		
2008–2010	Al Wasl		
2010	→ Hatta Club (loan)		

International career
2004	United Arab Emirates U23		
- * Club domestic league appearances and goals

Waleed Murad (Arabic: وليد مراد) was a UAE football player.

He was transferred to Al Wasl FC from Al-Nasr Sports Club in summer 2008.
