= Soufiane Alloudi =

Moroccan football striker

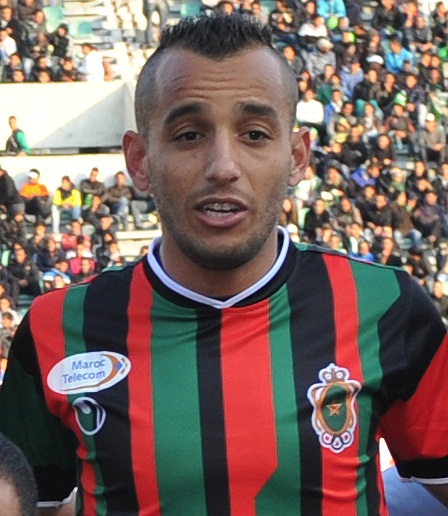

Personal information
- Date of birth: 1 July 1983 (age 43)
- Place of birth: El Gara, Morocco
- Height: 1.78 m (5 ft 10 in)
- Position: Striker

Team information
- Current team: KAC

Youth career
- Renaissance El Gara

Senior career*
Years	Team	Apps	(Gls)
2002–2007	Raja Casablanca	?	(25)
2007	→ Al-Ain (loan)	22	(12)
2008–2010	Al-Ain	22	(2)
2009–2010	→ Raja Casablanca (loan)	7	(1)
2010	→ Al Wasl (loan)	?	(?)
2011	Raja Casablanca	8	(0)
2012–2013	FAR Rabat	23	(2)
2012–2013	→ Widad Fez (loan)	0	(0)
2013–2015	Kawkab Marrakech	48	(9)
2015–2016	RS Berkane	3	(0)
2016–2017	Kawkab Marrakech	14	(0)

International career
2006–2010	Morocco	17	(7)
- * Club domestic league appearances and goals as of 7 March 2018

Soufiane Alloudi (Arabic: سفيان علودي, born July 1, 1983, in El Gara) is a former Moroccan football striker who played for several Moroccan clubs, including Kawkab de Marrakech.

In September 2007, Alloudi was transferred by Raja Casablanca to Al-Ain FC on a 3-year contract, with his loan fee reported to be $450.000.

He also played for Morocco, for whom he scored a first-half hat-trick in 28 minutes against Namibia in their opening match of the 2008 Africa Cup of Nations. Alloudi left the field before the end of the game, injured. After this injury, Morocco failed to qualify for the quarter-finals of the African Nations Cup and hence, the loss of Alloudi was said to be one of the reasons for this result.

== Al Ain FC ==
Soufiane was loaned to Al Ain FC in 2007 from Raja Casablanca and quickly won the hearts of the staff, teammates and fans. When his loan expired Al Ain FC managed to buy him from Raja Casablanca on a 3-year contract. He has some quick paces on both left and right sides of the wing. They were many speculations linking him to numerous European clubs, Olympique Marseille tried several times to sign him but weren't successful. Soufiane revealed recently that he has tied up a contract with Al-Ain FC that would keep him with them up till 2011, and if they were interested he would be more than happy to extend his contract.

During the summer of 2009 he was loaned out to Raja Casablanca until the end of the season to recover from his current injury. And in January 2010, Soufiane was loaned for a duration of 6 months to Al Wasl FC where he spent the remaining of the 2009-10 season. During his short spell with Al Wasl FC the club was able to win the 2009–10 Gulf Club Champions Cup.

=== International goals ===
#	Date	Venue	Opponent	Score	Result	Competition
1	17 October 2007	Stade Moulay Abdellah, Rabat, Morocco	Namibia	2 – 0	2 – 0	Friendly
2	21 November 2007	Stade Dominique Duvauchelle, Créteil, France	Senegal	3 – 0	3 – 0	Friendly
3	12 January 2008	Fez Stadium, Fes, Morocco	Zambia	2 – 0	2 – 0	Friendly
4	21 January 2008	Ohene Djan Stadium, Accra, Ghana	Namibia	1 – 0	5 – 1	2008 Africa Cup of Nations
5	21 January 2008	Ohene Djan Stadium, Accra, Ghana	Namibia	2 – 0	5 – 1	2008 Africa Cup of Nations
6	21 January 2008	Ohene Djan Stadium, Accra, Ghana	Namibia	3 – 1	5 – 1	2008 Africa Cup of Nations
7	26 March 2008	King Baudouin Stadium, Brussels, Belgium	Belgium	1 – 0	4 – 1	Friendly
