= Rogerinho (footballer, born 1984) =

Brazilian footballer

Personal information
- Full name: Rogério Miranda Silva
- Date of birth: December 24, 1984 (age 41)
- Place of birth: Paragominas-PA, Brazil
- Height: 1.74 m (5 ft 9 in)
- Position: Attacking midfielder

Team information
- Current team: São Francisco PA

Youth career
- 2004–2005: Remo

Senior career*
Years	Team	Apps	(Gls)
2005–2008	Figueirense	10	(0)
2006	→ Paysandu (Loan)		
2007–2008	→ Fortaleza (Loan)	20	(4)
2008–2010	Al Wasl		
2009–2010	→ Ponte Preta (Loan)	3	(1)
2009	→ Fortaleza (Loan)	20	(4)
2010	→ Bahia (Loan)	21	(4)
2011	Vissel Kobe	11	(0)
2012	Ceará	14	(3)
2012–2013	Náutico	7	(0)
2013–2014	Ceará	26	(3)
2014	ABC	16	(1)
2015	Paysandu	2	(0)
2015	Qingdao Jonoon	10	(1)
2016	Capivariano	0	(0)
2016	Confiança	4	(0)
2017	Resende	0	(0)
2019	Uberlândia	0	(0)
2019–	São Francisco PA		
- * Club domestic league appearances and goals as of 12:00, 21 May 2019 (UTC)

Rogério Miranda Silva or simply Rogerinho (born December 24, 1984) is a Brazilian professional footballer who plays as an attacking midfielder for São Francisco PA.

== Career ==
Rogerinho was born in Paragominas-PA.

After his move to the Emirates club Al Wasl, Rogério failed to secure a position in the first team squad despite his great shooting abilities, this led to him being loaned out to Ponte Preta in the 2008-2009 season, then to Fortaleza in the 2009-2010 season.

Standing for nine months and no club in 2018, Rogerinho earned a new chance in football after injury and surgery on his right knee, when he joined Uberlândia in 2019. In February 2019, he then joined São Francisco PA.

== Honours ==
- Pará State League: 2004, 2006
- Ceará State League: 2007
