= UAE League Cup =

- Founded: 2008
- Region: United Arab Emirates
- Teams: 14
- Current champions: Al-Wahda (4th title)
- Most championships: Shabab Al Ahli (5 titles)
- Broadcaster(s): Abu Dhabi Sports; Dubai Sports; Sharjah Sports
- Website: uaefa.ae
- 2025–26 UAE League Cup

The UAE League Cup (Arabic: كأس رابطة المحترفين الإماراتية) is a knockout tournament for clubs in the UAE Pro-League. The first edition of the tournament was played in the 2008–2009 season.

In the 2008–09 season, UAE League Cup replaced the UAE Federation Cup and became a second tier tournament, initially under the name of Etisalat Cup in 2008–2013 and Arabian Gulf Cup in 2013–2021 for sponsorship reasons.

== Finals ==
#	Season	Champion	Final score	Runner-up
1	2008–09	Al Ain	1–0	Al Wahda
2	2009–10	Al Jazira	2–0	Ajman
3	2010–11	Al Shabab	3–2	Al Ain
4	2011–12	Al Ahli	1–1 (a.e.t., 5–3 pens.)	Al Shabab
5	2012–13	Ajman	2–1	Al Jazira
6	2013–14	Al Ahli	2–1	Al Jazira
7	2014–15	Al Nasr	4–1	Sharjah
8	2015–16	Al Wahda	1–0	Al Shabab
9	2016–17	Al Ahli	2–0	Al Shabab
10	2017–18	Al Wahda	2–1	Al Wasl
11	2018–19	Shabab Al-Ahli	3–1 (a.e.t.)	Al Wahda
12	2019–20	Al Nasr	2–1	Shabab Al Ahli
13	2020–21	Shabab Al Ahli	0–0 (5–4 pens.)	Al Nasr
14	2021–22	Al Ain	2–2 (5–4 pens.)	Shabab Al Ahli
15	2022–23	Sharjah	2–1	Al Ain
16	2023–24	Al Wahda	1–0	Al Ain
17	2024–25	Al Jazira	2–1	Shabab Al-Ahli
18	2025–26	Al Wahda	0–0 (4–2 pens.)	Al Ain

== Performance by club ==
Club	Winners	Runners-up	Winning years	Runner-up years
Shabab Al Ahli	5	3	2012, 2014, 2017, 2019, 2021	2020, 2022, 2025
Al Wahda	4	2	2016, 2018, 2024, 2026	2009, 2019
Al Ain	2	4	2009, 2022	2011, 2023, 2024, 2026
Al Jazira	2	2	2010, 2025	2013, 2014
Al Nasr	2	1	2015, 2020	2021
Al Shabab	1	3	2011	2012, 2016, 2017
Ajman	1	1	2013	2010
Sharjah	1	1	2023	2015
Al Wasl	0	1	–	2018

== Top goalscorers ==
Rank	Nat	Name	Pos	Years	Team	Total
1	(Argentina)	Sebastián Tagliabúe	FW	2013–2024	Al Wahda (36),Sharjah FC (1)	37
2	(Brazil) (United Arab Emirates)	Fábio Lima	MF	2014–	Al Wasl (32)	32
3	(Senegal)	Makhete Diop	FW	2012–2022	Al Dhafra (22), Shabab Al Ahli (7),Sharjah FC (1)	30
4	(Brazil)	Ricardo Oliveira	FW	2009–2014	Al Jazira (27)	27
5	(Brazil) (Moldova)	Henrique Luvannor	FW	2015–2020	Al Shabab (15),Shabab Al Ahli (11)	26
6	(Brazil) (United Arab Emirates)	Caio Canedo	FW	2014–	Al Wasl (17), Al Ain (5)	22
7	(Brazil)	Grafite	FW	2011–2014	Shabab Al Ahli (20)	20
7	(Brazil)	Ciel	FW	2011–2018	Al Shabab (12),Shabab Al Ahli (5), Ittihad Kalba (1), Ittihad Kalba (2)	20
9
9	(Ivory Coast)	Boris Kabi	FW	2009–2015	Ajman (12), Al Dhafra (4), Dibba Al-Fujairah (3)	19
9	(Ivory Coast) (United Arab Emirates)	Ibrahim Diaky	MF	2008–2017	Al Jazira (12), Al Ain (7)	19

=== Top scorers by season ===
Season	Player	Club	Goals
2008–09	(Brazil) Fernando Baiano	Al Jazira	7
2009–10	(Ivory Coast) Boris Kabi	Ajman	7
2010–11	(Guinea) Ismaël Bangoura (Guinea) Aboubacar Camara (France) Michaël N'dri	Al-Nasr; Dubai; Dubai	7
2011–12	(Brazil) Grafite	Al Ahli	13
2012–13	(Mali) Founéké Sy	Ajman	10
2013–14	(Brazil) Ricardo Oliveira	Al Jazira	6
2014–15	(Brazil) Edgar	Al Shabab	6
2015–16	(Brazil) Jô	Al Shabab	8
2016–17	(Moldova) Henrique Luvannor	Al Shabab	10
2017–18	(Argentina) Sebastián Tagliabúe	Al Wahda	14
2018–19	(Brazil) Caio Lucas	Al Ain	7
2019–20	(Spain) Pedro Conde (Brazil) Fábio Lima	Baniyas; Al Wasl	6
2020–21	(Togo) Peniel Mlapa	Ittihad Kalba	5
2021–22	(Brazil) Michel Araújo	Al Wasl	6
2022–23	(Portugal) Aylton Boa Morte	Khor Fakkan	5
2023–24	(Brazil) (United Arab Emirates) Fábio Lima	Al Wasl	5
2024–25	(Argentina) Ramón Miérez	Al Jazira	5
2025–26	(Ivory Coast) Abdoulaye Toure	Al-Nasr	5

== See also ==
- UAE Super Cup
- UAE President's Cup
- Arabian Gulf Cup
