= 25th GCC Champions League =

2009 GCC Champions League
Tournament details
- Dates: 15 September 2009 – 2010
- Teams: 12 (from AFC/UAFA confederations)

Final positions
- Champions: (United Arab Emirates) Al Wasl (1st title)
- Runners-up: Qatar SC

Tournament statistics
- Matches played: 30
- Goals scored: 63 (2.1 per match)
- Top scorer: (United Arab Emirates) Saeed Al Kass (5 goals)
- Best player: (United Arab Emirates) Fadel Ahmad

The 25th GCC Champions League (Arabic: دوري أبطال مجلس التعاون الخليجي) was the 25th edition of the GCC Champions League for clubs of the Gulf Cooperation Council nations, held in 2009.

The tournament format has changed from the 2008 edition, from two groups of 5 teams to four groups of three teams.

== The groups ==
The draw was made on 18 July 2009 in Bahrain.

Four groups of three teams.

Winners qualify for the semi-finals.

| Group A | Group B | Group C | Group D |
|---|---|---|---|
| (Bahrain) Muharraq Club; Al Arabi Kuwait (United Arab Emirates) Al Shabab | (Qatar) Al Khor (Oman) Sur (Saudi Arabia) Al-Nassr | (Oman) Al-Oruba; Qatar SC (Saudi Arabia) Al-Ettifaq | Bahrain Riffa Club; Kuwait SC (United Arab Emirates) Al Wasl |

== Fixtures and results ==
- Group stage games are played on a home and away basis between September and December
- Group winners enter a two legged semi-final stage

== Group A ==
| Team | Pld | W | D | L | GF | GA | GD | Pts |
|---|---|---|---|---|---|---|---|---|
| (Bahrain) Muharraq Club | 4 | 3 | 0 | 1 | 9 | 4 | +5 | 9 |
| Al Arabi Kuwait | 4 | 2 | 1 | 1 | 5 | 6 | –1 | 7 |
| (United Arab Emirates) Al Shabab | 4 | 0 | 1 | 3 | 3 | 7 | –4 | 1 |

=== Results ===
22 September 2009
| Al Shabab | 0–2 | Al Arabi |
29 September 2009
| Al Muharraq | 1–0 | Al Shabab |
27 October 2009
| Al Arabi | 1–0 | Al Muharraq |
3 November 2009
| Al Arabi | 1–1 | Al Shabab |
20 November 2009
| Al Shabab | 2–3 | Al Muharraq |
8 December 2009
| Al Muharraq | 5–1 | Al Arabi |

== Group B ==
| Team | Pld | W | D | L | GF | GA | GD | Pts |
|---|---|---|---|---|---|---|---|---|
| (Saudi Arabia) Al-Nassr | 4 | 3 | 1 | 0 | 11 | 4 | +7 | 10 |
| (Oman) Sur | 4 | 1 | 1 | 2 | 4 | 5 | –1 | 4 |
| (Qatar) Al Khor | 4 | 1 | 0 | 3 | 2 | 8 | –6 | 3 |

=== Results ===
15 September 2009
| Sur | 1–2 | Al Nasr |
29 September 2009
| Sur | 1–0 | Al Khor |
19 October 2009
| Al Nasr | 2–2 | Sur |
27 October 2009
| Al Nasr | 3–1 | Al Khor |
25 November 2009
| Al Khor | 0–4 | Al Nasr |
8 December 2009
| Al Khor | 1–0 | Sur |

== Group C ==
| Team | Pld | W | D | L | GF | GA | GD | Pts |
|---|---|---|---|---|---|---|---|---|
| Qatar SC | 4 | 2 | 2 | 0 | 8 | 6 | +2 | 8 |
| (Saudi Arabia) Al-Ettifaq | 4 | 2 | 1 | 1 | 7 | 6 | +1 | 7 |
| (Oman) Al-Oruba | 4 | 0 | 1 | 3 | 5 | 8 | –3 | 1 |

=== Results ===
16 September 2009
| Qatar SC | 3–2 | Al Ettifaq |
29 September 2009
| Qatar SC | 2–0 | Al-Oruba |
19 October 2009
| Al Ettifaq | 1–1 | Qatar SC |
27 October 2009
| Al Ettifaq | 3–2 | Al-Oruba |
25 November 2009
| Al-Oruba | 0–1 | Al Ettifaq |
8 December 2009
| Al-Oruba | 1–2 | Qatar SC |

== Group D ==
| Team | Pld | W | D | L | GF | GA | GD | Pts |
|---|---|---|---|---|---|---|---|---|
| (United Arab Emirates) Al Wasl | 4 | 2 | 2 | 0 | 5 | 3 | +2 | 8 |
| Bahrain Riffa Club | 4 | 1 | 2 | 1 | 4 | 4 | 0 | 5 |
| Kuwait SC | 4 | 0 | 2 | 2 | 2 | 4 | –2 | 2 |

=== Results ===
22 September 2009
| Al Kuwait | 1–2 | Al Wasl |
29 September 2009
| Al Wasl | 2–2 | Riffa Club |
27 October 2009
| Riffa Club | 2–1 | Al Kuwait |
20 November 2009
| Riffa Club | 0–1 | Al Wasl |
8 December 2009
| Al Kuwait | 0–0 | Riffa Club |
16 December 2009
| Al Wasl | 0–0 | Al Kuwait |

== Semi-finals ==
=== 1st legs ===
8 March 2010

| Muharraq Club (Bahrain) | 0–1 | Qatar SC |

25 March 2010

| Al-Nassr (Saudi Arabia) | 3–1 | (United Arab Emirates) Al Wasl |

=== 2nd legs ===
23 March 2010

| Qatar SC | 2–0 | (Bahrain) Muharraq Club |

30 March 2010

| Al Wasl (United Arab Emirates) | 4–2 | (Saudi Arabia) Al-Nassr |
Penalties
| | 4–2 |

== Final ==
=== 1st legs ===
13 April 2010

| Qatar SC | 2–2 | (United Arab Emirates) Al Wasl |

=== 2nd legs ===
27 April 2010

| Al Wasl (United Arab Emirates) | 1–1 | Qatar SC |

== Winner ==
GCC Champions League
2009 Winners

Al Wasl
1st Title

== Top goalscorers ==
| Rank | Player name | Team | Goals |
|---|---|---|---|
| 1 | (United Arab Emirates) Saeed Al Kass | Al Wasl FC | 6 |
| 2 | 11 players | | 2 |
| 3 | 32 players | | 1 |

- Source: Goalzz.com
