= Iman Mobali =

Iranian footballer and coach

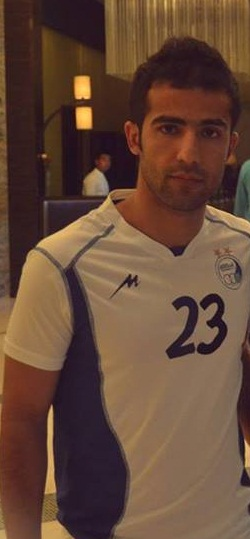
- Mobali with Esteghlal at 2014

Personal information
- Full name: Iman Mobali
- Date of birth: 3 November 1982 (age 43)
- Place of birth: Izeh, Khuzestan Province, Iran
- Height: 1.73 m (5 ft 8 in)
- Position: Midfielder

Team information
- Current team: Nassaji (assistant coach)

Youth career
- Esteghlal Ahvaz
- Foolad

Senior career*
Years	Team	Apps	(Gls)
2000–2005	Foolad	73	(24)
2003	→ Nirouye Zamini (loan)		
2005–2008	Al-Shabab	45	(20)
2008–2009	Al Wasl	19	(7)
2009–2010	Al Nasr	15	(6)
2010–2011	Esteghlal	30	(0)
2011–2012	Sharjah	8	(0)
2012–2013	Paykan	25	(2)
2013–2014	Esteghlal Khuzestan	25	(2)
2014	→ Esteghlal (loan)	4	(0)
2014–2017	Naft Tehran	74	(5)
2017–2018	Foolad	23	(1)
2018	Esteghlal Khuzestan	12	(0)
Total		353	(67)

International career^{‡}
2000–2001	Iran U20	13	(?)
2002–2003	Iran U23	11	(2)
2001–2011	Iran	57	(2)

Managerial career
- 2018–2019: Esteghlal Khuzestan (player-coach)
- 2019: Foolad (assistant)
- 2020–2021: Nassaji (assistant)
- 2021: Baadraan (assistant)
- 2021: Foolad (assistant)
- 2022–: Shabab Al Ahli (youth)
- * Club domestic league appearances and goals as of 21 October 2016 ‡ National team caps and goals as of 10 October 2026

Iman Mobali (Persian: ایمان مبعلی; born 3 November 1982) is an Iranian retired football player and coach.

== Club career ==
=== Foolad ===
Mobali joined Foolad's senior team in 2000. He was considered to be the creative dynamo of the highly talented Foolad, based in Iran's oil-rich Khuzestan province. Mobali was the key member of his team during Foolad's Iran Pro League championship. Which also secured a berth in the AFC Champions League for the first time in club history.

=== Al-Shabab ===
In 2005 Mobali signed a contract with Al-Shabab in the UAE League. In his first season, he scored 6 times in 15 appearances. In the following season Mobali was hit with a series of injuries and only managed to make 11 league appearances. In his last year with Al-Shabab he had his best year, he scored 9 goals in 19 appearances and Al-Shabab won the league title.

=== Al Wasl & Al Nasr ===
In summer 2008 he signed a contract with the UAE giants, Al Wasl. In his one and only season with the club, Mobali scored 7 times in 19 appearances. He left the club at the end of the season. He signed for Al Nasr in summer 2009. After an unsuccessful season with Al Nasr, Mobali decided not to extend his contract and returned to Iran.

=== Esteghlal ===
Mobali signed a one-year contract with Esteghlal in the spring of 2010. He made 36 total appearances and did not manage to score a goal. He left the club at the end of the season and signed with UAE club Al Sharjah. He only made 8 appearances before leaving the club.

=== Paykan ===
After his stint in Sharjah, Mobali again returned to the Iran Pro League and again returned to Tehran; this time he signed with Paykan in the summer of 2012. He scored twice in 25 appearances but was unable to help Paykan from getting relegated to the Azadegan League.

=== Esteghlal Khuzestan ===
After Paykan was relegated, Mobali left the team and joined newly promoted club Esteghlal Khuzestan. He made 25 appearances and scored twice before being loaned out to his former club Esteghlal. He made 4 appearances with Esteghlal before season's end.

=== Naft Tehran ===
In summer of 2014, Mobali signed a two-year contract with Naft Tehran. He finished the 2014–15 season with 13 assists, most in the league. On 1 July 2015 Mobali extended his contract with Naft Tehran for one more year.

=== Club career statistics ===
As of 11 December 2014

Club performance			League		Cup		Continental		Total	
Season	Club	League	Apps	Goals	Apps	Goals	Apps	Goals	Apps	Goals
Iran			League		Hazfi Cup		Asia		Total	
2000–01	Foolad	Azadegan League	7	2			–	–		
2001–02	Foolad	Pro League	16	2			–	–		
2002–03	Foolad	Pro League		0			–	–		
2002–03	Niroye Zamini	Division 1					–	–		
2003–04	Foolad	Pro League	21	8			–	–		
2004–05	Foolad	Pro League	29	12			–	–		
United Arab Emirates			League		President's Cup		Asia		Total	
2005–06	Al Shabab	Pro League	15	6			–	–		
2006–07	Al Shabab	Pro League	11	5			–	–		
2007–08	Al Shabab	Pro League	19	9			–	–		
2008–09	Al Wasl	Pro League	19	7			–	–		
2009–10	Al Nasr	Pro League	15	6	4	1	–	–	19	6
Iran			League		Hazfi Cup		Asia		Total	
2010–11	Esteghlal	Pro League	30	0	2	0	4	0	36	0
United Arab Emirates			League		President's Cup		Asia		Total	
2011–12	Al Sharjah	Pro League	8	0			–	–		
Iran			League		Hazfi Cup		Asia		Total	
2012–13	Paykan	Pro League	25	2	1	0	–	–	26	2
2013–14	Esteghlal Khuzestan	Pro League	25	2	0	0	–	–	25	2
2014–15	Naft Tehran	Pro League	27	1	2	0	6	0	35	1
Total	Iran						4	0		
Total	United Arab Emirates		87	33			0	0		
Total	Career total						4	0		

- Assist Goals

Season	Team	Assists
10–11	Esteghlal	5
12–13	Paykan	2
13–14	Esteghlal Khuzestan	6
14–15	Naft Tehran	13
15–16	Naft Tehran	3
16–17	Naft Tehran	8

== International career ==
At international level Mobali is considered one of Asia's brightest prospects. Mobali made his debut for the Iran national team in January 2001 against China. He was among Iran's under-23 squad in 2002, winning a gold medal at the Busan Asian Games.

=== 2011 Asian Cup ===
Mobali started most of the matches in the group stage for "Team Melli" in 2011 AFC Asian Cup, and scored a beautiful goal in a match against Iraq from a curling free-kick.

=== International goals ===
Scores and results list Iran's goal tally first.

#	Date	Venue	Opponent	Score	Result	Competition
1	5 September 2003	Azadi Stadium, Tehran	Jordan	2–1	4–1	2004 AFC Asian Cup qualification
2	11 January 2011	Ahmed bin Ali Stadium, Al Rayyan	Iraq	2–1	2–1	2011 AFC Asian Cup

== Awards and honours ==
=== Club ===
Foolad

- Iran Pro League: 2004–05

Al-Shabab

- UAE Pro League: 2007–08

Naft Tehran

- Hazfi Cup: 2016–17

=== Country ===
Iran U-23

- Asian Games: 2002

Iran

- WAFF: 2004
- Asian Cup third place: 2004

=== Individual ===
- Persian Gulf Pro League Top Assistant: 2014–15
