= 2015 GCC U-23 Championship =

البطولة الخليجية للمنتخبات تحت 23 سنة لكرة القدم (in Arabic)

Tournament details
- Host country: Bahrain
- Dates: 16–28 January
- Teams: 6 (from 1 confederation)
- Venue: 1 (in 1 host city)

Final positions
- Champions: Saudi Arabia (3rd title)
- Runners-up: Kuwait
- Third place: Oman
- Fourth place: United Arab Emirates

Tournament statistics
- Matches played: 11
- Goals scored: 32 (2.91 per match)
- Top scorer: (Kuwait) Ahmed Hizam Al Shammari (4 goals)
- Best player: (Saudi Arabia) Abdulmajeed Al-Sulaiheem
- Best goalkeeper: (Saudi Arabia) Ahmed Al-Rehaili

The 2015 GCC U-23 Championship was the sixth edition of the GCC U-23 Championship. It took place in Bahrain for the second time. Six nations took part. The competition was held in Riffa from 16 to 29 January. Saudi Arabia won their third title after defeating Kuwait 5–2 in the final.

The 2015 edition was officially known as the Huawei GCC National Teams Under-23 Championship for the second time after the sponsorship deal between Huawei and the AGCFF.

It was initially going to be hosted by Qatar in September 2014, but was later moved to Bahrain and scheduled for January 2015 The group stage draw was held on 4 June 2014.

The semi-final and final were delayed by a number of days due to the death of King Abdullah bin Abdulaziz Al Saud.

== Teams ==
Team	Previous appearances in tournament (Note: Bold indicates champion for that year. Italic indicates host for that year.)
Bahrain (host)	5 (2008, 2010, 2011, 2012, **2013**)
Kuwait	5 (2008, 2010, 2011, 2012, 2013)
Qatar	5 (2008, 2010, 2011, 2012, 2013)
Oman	5 (2008, 2010, **2011**, 2012, 2013)
Saudi Arabia	5 (**2008**, 2010, 2011, **2012**, 2013)
United Arab Emirates	4 (**2010**, 2011, 2012, 2013)

== Venues ==
2015 GCC U-23 Championship is located in Bahrain	Riffa
2015 GCC U-23 Championship is located in Bahrain	Bahrain National Stadium
2015 GCC U-23 Championship is located in Bahrain	Capacity: **24,000**

== Group stage ==
=== Group A ===
Pos	Team	Pld	W	D	L	GF	GA	GD	Pts	Qualification
1	United Arab Emirates	2	1	1	0	2	0	+2	**4**	Advance to knockout stage
2	Kuwait	2	1	0	1	3	2	+1	**3**	Advance to knockout stage
3	Qatar	2	0	1	1	0	3	−3	**1**	

Source: kooora
Rules for classification: Group stage tiebreakers
16 January 2015
16:30

Kuwait	0–2	United Arab Emirates
		Ahmed 71'; Salmeen 90+2'

Bahrain National Stadium, Riffa

18 January 2015
19:15

Kuwait	3–0	Qatar
Al-Tararwa 22'; Al Shammari 56'; Dashti 60'

Bahrain National Stadium, Riffa

20 January 2015
19:15

United Arab Emirates	0–0	Qatar

Bahrain National Stadium, Riffa
Referee: Mahmood Al-Majarafi (Oman)

=== Group B ===
Pos	Team	Pld	W	D	L	GF	GA	GD	Pts	Qualification
1	Oman	2	1	1	0	3	2	+1	**4**	Advance to knockout stage
2	Saudi Arabia	2	1	0	1	5	5	0	**3**	Advance to knockout stage
3	Bahrain (H)	2	0	1	1	2	3	−1	**1**	

Source: kooora
Rules for classification: Group stage tiebreakers
(H) Hosts
16 January 2015
19:15

Saudi Arabia	3–2	Bahrain
Al-Sulaiheem 32'; Al-Nadhri 77'; Al-Saiari 90+1'		Hassan 47'; Matar 51'

Bahrain National Stadium, Riffa

18 January 2015
16:30

Saudi Arabia	2–3	Oman
Al-Bishi 68'; Al-Nadhri 72'		Al-Rushadi 9', 43'; Al-Hamdani 48'

Bahrain National Stadium, Riffa

20 January 2015
16:30

Bahrain	0–0	Oman

Bahrain National Stadium, Riffa
Referee: Sultan Al-Marzooqi (United Arab Emirates)

== Knockout stage ==
In the knockout stage, extra time and penalty shoot-out were to be used to decide the winner if necessary (Regulations Articles 10.1 and 10.3).

=== Bracket ===
Semi-finals
26 January – Riffa
United Arab Emirates	1 (3)
**Saudi Arabia (p)**	**1 (5)**
26 January – Riffa
Oman	1 (4)
**Kuwait (p)**	**1 (5)**

Final
28 January – Riffa
**Saudi Arabia**	**5**
Kuwait	2
Third place match
28 January – Riffa
United Arab Emirates	1
**Oman**	**2**

=== Fifth place play-off ===
22 January 2015
17:45

Qatar	1–2	Bahrain
Alaaeldin 29'		Adel 73'; Al-Osfor 85'

Bahrain National Stadium, Riffa

=== Semi-finals ===
26 January 2015
16:30

United Arab Emirates	1–1	Saudi Arabia
Mubarak 25'		Al-Kharaa 6'
Penalties
	3–5

Bahrain National Stadium, Riffa
Referee: Abdulaziz Abdulla (Bahrain)

26 January 2015
19:30

Oman	1–1	Kuwait
Fazari 42'		Al Shammari 7'
Penalties
	4–5

Bahrain National Stadium, Riffa
Referee: Abdulrahman Al-Jassim (Qatar)

=== Third place play-off ===
28 January 2015
15:45

United Arab Emirates	1–2	Oman
Jassim 67' (pen.)		Al-Siyabi 49'; Al-Rawahi 79'

Bahrain National Stadium, Riffa

=== Final ===
28 January 2015
18:45

Saudi Arabia	5–2	Kuwait
Al-Bishi 32'; Al-Saiari 40'; Al-Nadhri 67'; Al-Sulaiheem 74' (pen.); Othman 90+4'	Report	Al Shammari 46', 86' (pen.)

Bahrain National Stadium, Riffa

==== Winners ====
2015 GCC U-23 Championship champion

**Saudi Arabia**
**Third title**

== Awards ==
The following awards were given at the conclusion of the tournament:

Top Goalscorers	Most Valuable Player	Best goalkeeper
(Kuwait) Ahmed Hizam Al Shammari	(Saudi Arabia) Abdulmajeed Al-Sulaiheem	(Saudi Arabia) Ahmed Al-Rehaili

== Goalscorers ==
There have been 32 goals scored in 11 matches, for an average of 2.91 goals per match.

4 goals

- (Kuwait) Ahmed Hizam Al Shammari

3 goals

- (Saudi Arabia) Ahmed Al-Nadhri

2 goals

- (Oman) Hatem Al-Rushadi
- (Saudi Arabia) Abdulaziz Al-Bishi
- (Saudi Arabia) Mohammed Al-Saiari
- (Saudi Arabia) Abdulmajeed Al-Sulaiheem

1 goal

- (Bahrain) Mohamed Adel
- (Bahrain) Ali Al-Osfor
- (Bahrain) Ali Hassan
- (Bahrain) Mohammed Matar
- (Kuwait) Yaqoub Al-Tararwa
- (Kuwait) Mahmoud Dashti
- (Oman) Khaled Al-Hamdani
- (Oman) Mohammed Al-Rawahi
- (Oman) Ahmed Al-Siyabi
- (Oman) Omer Fazari
- (Qatar) Ahmed Alaaeldin
- (Saudi Arabia) Faisel Al-Kharaa
- (Saudi Arabia) Mazen Othman
- (United Arab Emirates) Yousef Ahmed
- (United Arab Emirates) Saeed Jassim
- (United Arab Emirates) Khalfan Mubarak
- (United Arab Emirates) Ali Salmeen
