= 2011 GCC U-23 Championship =

البطولة الخليجية للمنتخبات تحت 23 سنة لكرة القدم (in Arabic)

Tournament details
- Host country: Qatar
- Dates: 12–21 August
- Teams: 6 (from 1 confederation)
- Venue: 1 (in 1 host city)

Final positions
- Champions: Oman (1st title)
- Runners-up: United Arab Emirates
- Third place: Saudi Arabia
- Fourth place: Qatar

Tournament statistics
- Matches played: 11
- Goals scored: 35 (3.18 per match)
- Top scorer(s): (Saudi Arabia) Yahya Al-Shehri (3 goals)
- Best player: (Oman) Hamoud Al-Saadi
- Best goalkeeper: (United Arab Emirates) Ahmed Mahmoud

The 2011 GCC U-23 Championship was the third edition of the GCC U-23 Championship. It took place in Doha, Qatar for the second time. Six nations took part. The competition was held in Doha from 12 to 21 August. Oman won their first title after defeating United Arab Emirates 4–2 on penalties in the final.

== Teams ==
Team	Previous appearances in tournament (Note: Bold indicates champion for that year. Italic indicates host for that year.)
Bahrain	2 (2008, 2010)
Kuwait	2 (2008, 2010)
Qatar (host)	2 (2008, 2010)
Oman	2 (2008, 2010)
Saudi Arabia	2 (**2008**, 2010)
United Arab Emirates	1 (**2010**)

== Venues ==
2011 GCC U-23 Championship is located in Qatar	Doha
2011 GCC U-23 Championship is located in Qatar	Aspire Academy Stadium
2011 GCC U-23 Championship is located in Qatar	Capacity: **5,580**

== Group stage ==
=== Group A ===
Pos	Team	Pld	W	D	L	GF	GA	GD	Pts	Qualification
1	Saudi Arabia	2	2	0	0	6	0	+6	**6**	Advance to knockout stage
2	Qatar (H)	2	1	0	1	2	5	−3	**3**	Advance to knockout stage
3	Kuwait	2	0	0	2	1	4	−3	**0**	

Source: kooora
Rules for classification: Group stage tiebreakers
(H) Hosts
12 August 2011
21:15

Qatar	0–4	Saudi Arabia
	Report	Al-Shehri 18'; A. Al-Dawsari 21'; Hamood 26'; Al-Bishi 90+2'

Aspire Academy Stadium, Doha

14 August 2011
23:30

Saudi Arabia	2–0	Kuwait
S. Al-Dossari 11'; Al-Bishi 71'	Report

Aspire Academy Stadium, Doha

16 August 2011
23:30

Kuwait	1–2	Qatar
Khamis 35'		Al-Haydos 52'; Al-Nahwi 82'

Aspire Academy Stadium, Doha

=== Group B ===
Pos	Team	Pld	W	D	L	GF	GA	GD	Pts	Qualification
1	United Arab Emirates	2	1	0	1	7	4	+3	**3**	Advance to knockout stage
2	Oman	2	1	0	1	3	3	0	**3**	Advance to knockout stage
3	Bahrain	2	1	0	1	2	5	−3	**3**	

Source: kooora
Rules for classification: Group stage tiebreakers
12 August 2011
23:30

Oman	0–1	Bahrain
		Al-Banna 65'

Aspire Academy Stadium, Doha

14 August 2011
21:15

Oman	3–2	United Arab Emirates
Al-Saadi 6'; Al-Hadhri 44'; Al-Shimli 47'		Al Fardan 39' (pen.); Ahmed 82'

Aspire Academy Stadium, Doha

16 August 2011
21:15

Bahrain	1–5	United Arab Emirates
Ali 85' (pen.)		Haikal 30'; Ali 39'; Fawzi 62'; Mabkhout 82', 89'

Aspire Academy Stadium, Doha

== Knockout stage ==
In the knockout stage, extra time and penalty shoot-out were to be used to decide the winner if necessary (Regulations Articles 10.1 and 10.3).

=== Bracket ===
Semi-finals
19 August – Doha
Saudi Arabia	3
**Oman**	**4**
19 August – Doha
**United Arab Emirates**	**2**
Qatar	0

Final
21 August – Doha
**Oman (p)**	**0 (4)**
United Arab Emirates	0 (2)
Third place match
21 August – Doha
**Saudi Arabia**	**2**
Qatar	1

=== Fifth place play-off ===
18 August 2011
21:15

Kuwait	1–1	Bahrain
Mohammed 12'		Al-Husaini 3'
Penalties
	0–3

Aspire Academy Stadium, Doha

=== Semi-finals ===
19 August 2011
21:15

Saudi Arabia	3–4	Oman
Al-Shehri 40'; Otaif 80', 90+4'	Report	Al-Saadi 8'; Said 36'; Al-Farsi 38'; Al-Hadhri 60'

Aspire Academy Stadium, Doha

19 August 2011
23:30

United Arab Emirates	2–0	Qatar
Ahmed 61'; Ali 70'

Aspire Academy Stadium, Doha

=== Third place play-off ===
21 August 2011
21:15

Saudi Arabia	2–1	Qatar
Al-Shehri 69'; Al-Mutairi 90'	Report	Al-Nahwi 34'

Aspire Academy Stadium, Doha

=== Final ===
21 August 2011
23:30

Oman	0–0	United Arab Emirates
	Report
Penalties
Al-Owaisi (penalty scored); Al-Nuaimi (penalty scored); Al-Farsi (penalty scored); Said (penalty scored)	4–2	(penalty scored) Al Fardan; (penalty scored) Fawzi; (penalty missed) Ahmed; (penalty missed) Sanqour

Aspire Academy Stadium, Doha

==== Winners ====
2011 GCC U-23 Championship champion

**Oman**
**First title**

== Awards ==
The following awards were given at the conclusion of the tournament:

Top Goalscorers	Most Valuable Player	Best goalkeeper
(Saudi Arabia) Yahya Al-Shehri	(Oman) Hamoud Al-Saadi	(United Arab Emirates) Ahmed Mahmoud

== Goalscorers ==
There have been 35 goals scored in 11 matches, for an average of 3.18 goals per match.

3 goals

- (Saudi Arabia) Yahya Al-Shehri

2 goals

- (Oman) Hussain Al-Hadhri
- (Oman) Hamoud Al-Saadi
- (Qatar) Ahmed Al-Nahwi
- (Saudi Arabia) Sultan Al-Bishi
- (Saudi Arabia) Saqer Otaif
- (United Arab Emirates) Mohamed Ahmed
- (United Arab Emirates) Ahmed Ali
- (United Arab Emirates) Ali Mabkhout

1 goal

- (Bahrain) Mohamed Al-Banna
- (Bahrain) Sami Al-Husaini
- (Bahrain) Mohamed Ali
- (Kuwait) Abdulhadi Khamis
- (Kuwait) Naif Mohammed
- (Oman) Eid Al-Farsi
- (Oman) Nasser Al-Shimli
- (Oman) Qasim Said
- (Qatar) Hassan Al-Haydos
- (Saudi Arabia) Abdullah Al-Dawsari
- (Saudi Arabia) Shafi Al-Dossari
- (Saudi Arabia) Khaled Al-Mutairi
- (Saudi Arabia) Saud Hamood
- (United Arab Emirates) Habib Al Fardan
- (United Arab Emirates) Mohamed Fawzi
- (United Arab Emirates) Abdulaziz Haikal

== See also ==
- Arabian Gulf Cup
- Arab Gulf Cup Football Federation
