= Anthony Hudson (soccer) =

English football manager (born 1981)

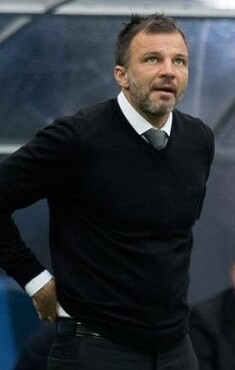
- Hudson as manager of New Zealand in 2017

Personal information
- Full name: Anthony Patrick Hudson
- Date of birth: March 11, 1981 (age 45)
- Place of birth: Seattle, Washington, United States
- Position: Midfielder

Team information
- Current team: Thailand (head coach)

Youth career
- West Ham United

Senior career*
Years	Team	Apps	(Gls)
1998–2001	West Ham United		
1998	→ Luton Town (loan)		
2001	NEC Nijmegen		
2006–2008	Wilmington Hammerheads	10	(0)

Managerial career
- 2008–2010: Real Maryland Monarchs
- 2011: Newport County
- 2011–2014: Bahrain U23
- 2013–2014: Bahrain
- 2014–2017: New Zealand U23
- 2014–2017: New Zealand
- 2017–2019: Colorado Rapids
- 2020–2021: United States U20
- 2023: United States (interim)
- 2023: Al-Markhiya
- 2024: Al-Arabi
- 2025: BG Pathum United
- 2025–: Thailand
Medal record
Men's football
Representing Thailand (as manager)
FIFA ASEAN Cup
Runner-up	2026 Indonesia	Team
- * Club domestic league appearances and goals

Anthony Patrick Hudson (born March 11, 1981) is an English professional football manager and former player who is head coach of the Thailand national team.

Hudson became one of the youngest coaches to earn the UEFA Pro Licence, the highest coaching award in football, in 2012. Hudson has managed the Bahrain and New Zealand national teams, leading them to the 2015 AFC Asian Cup and 2017 FIFA Confederations Cup respectively. Hudson also became the youngest ever manager to lead a team in FIFA Confederations Cup history while managing New Zealand. In 2023, Hudson had briefly been the interim coach of the United States national team, before stepping down before the start of the 2023 CONCACAF Nations League Finals.

== Early life and playing career ==
Hudson was born in Seattle on March 11, 1981, to former Chelsea, Stoke City, Arsenal professional player and England international Alan Hudson. Raised in England, he attended Millfield School.

Hudson started playing in the youth system at Premier League club West Ham United, before being loaned to Luton Town. After being released by West Ham, Hudson signed a two-year deal with Dutch First Division team NEC Nijmegen. After six months, however, he asked to be released and returned home to England. He then moved to American lower division club Wilmington Hammerheads in 2006, ultimately appearing in 10 league games.

== Coaching career ==
=== United Soccer League ===
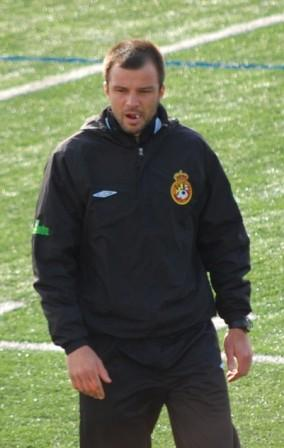
Hudson with Real Maryland Monarchs in 2008

In 2005, Hudson became player-assistant head coach of USL Second Division team Wilmington Hammerheads, having spent the previous two years working as an academy coach at AC Diablos SC.

On October 28, 2008, Hudson was named as Real Maryland Monarchs head coach at the age of 27. He was the youngest professional manager (head coach) in the U.S. at the time. In his first season as manager he led the club, which had finished bottom of the table in 2008, to fifth place and a Playoffs spot, their first visit to the post-season. Real Maryland were knocked out in the quarter-final after a 3–1 defeat by the Charlotte Eagles. Hudson was also nominated for the USL Second Division 2009 Coach of the Year Award.

In the 2010 USL Second Division, Real Maryland finished last, having not won in their final ten games of the season. After overcoming Reading United in the first round of the 2010 US Open Cup, Real Maryland were knocked out in the second round by the Richmond Kickers. Hudson left Real Maryland at the conclusion of the 2010 season after two seasons in charge.

=== Tottenham Hotspur ===
After leaving Real Maryland following the 2010 season, Hudson returned to the United Kingdom to take up a post coaching Tottenham Hotspur's reserves.

=== Newport County ===
In April 2011, Hudson, aged 30, was appointed manager of Conference Premier club Newport County with seven games remaining of their 2010–11 season. He arrived with a "glittering reference" from Harry Redknapp, who likened him to "a young José Mourinho".

Hudson took charge of Newport County for the first time in a 2–1 home victory over Darlington. A further three wins and two losses followed as Newport County finished ninth in the 2010–11 Conference Premier. In July 2011, Hudson was working towards the UEFA Pro Licence with the English Football Association. On September 28, 2011, with Newport having won only once in their first 12 games, Hudson was sacked, despite new signing David Pipe stating "we've lost quite a few games lately but everyone is definitely behind the gaffer", and senior players "contacting the press to let the fans know what the players think". Following Hudson's departure, Newport Chairman Chris Blight was quoted as saying "We are a quarter of the way through the season and to be where we are, to Newport County Football Club is not what we expected or anticipated."

=== Bahrain ===
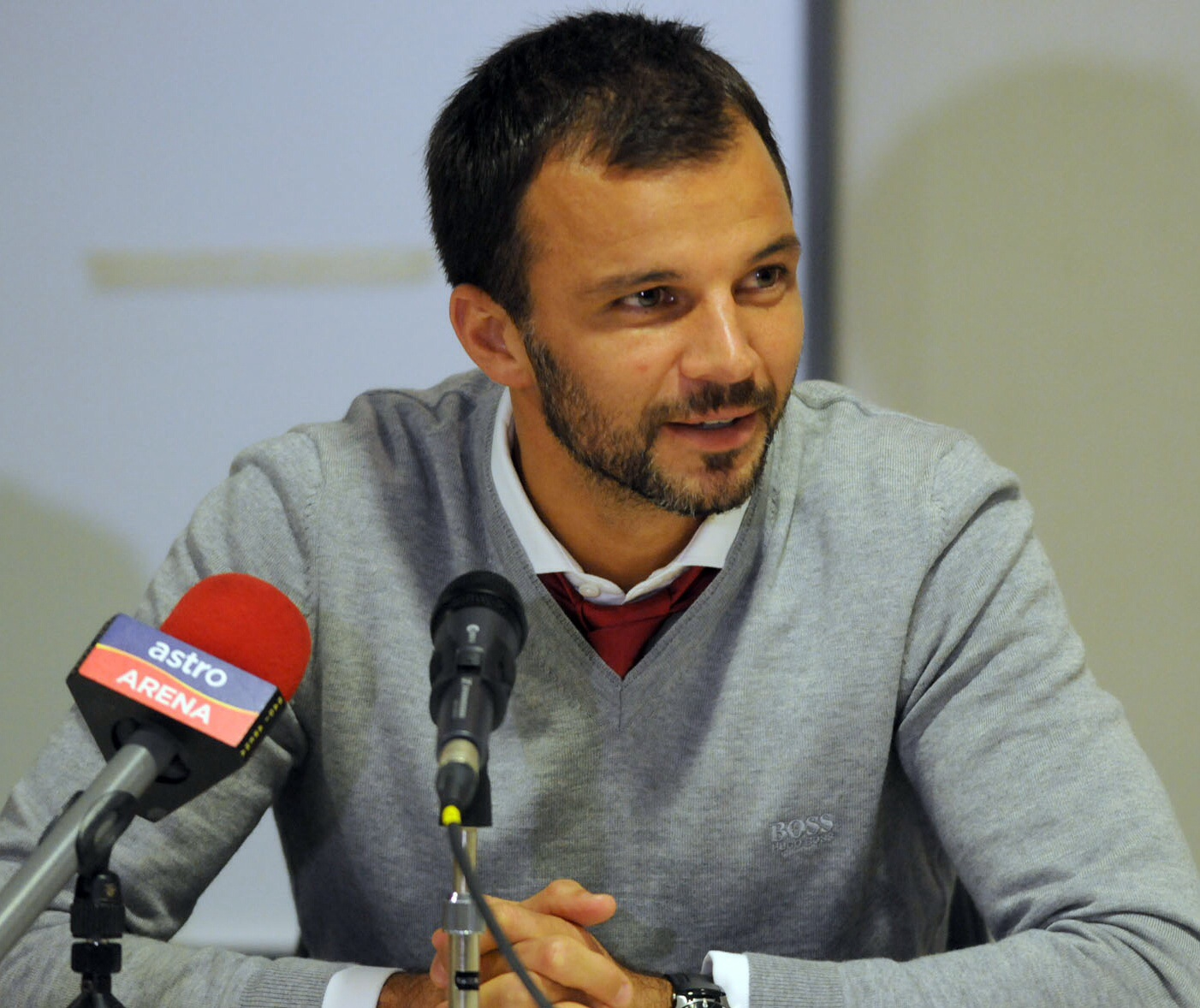
Hudson with Bahrain national football team in 2013

On March 21, 2012, Hudson was appointed manager of the Bahrain under-23 team. He was brought in to coach the national under-23 and Olympic team by Peter Taylor, national team coach of Bahrain senior team. Hudson led Bahrain under-23 to the final of the 2012 GCC U-23 Championship, eventually losing 2–0 to Saudi Arabia under-23. Hudson then worked under Argentinian coach Gabriel Calderón after Taylor's sacking on October 17, 2012. Hudson signed a two-year extension as the Bahrain under-23 manager in June.

Hudson led the Bahrain U23 team to their first title at the 2013 GCC U-23 Championship, beating Saudi Arabia in the final. This was the first official gold medal the Bahrain U23 national team have won in their history.

On August 13, 2013, Hudson was appointed manager of Bahrain, succeeding Calderón. Hudson first took charge of Bahrain in a 2–1 friendly loss to Kuwait in September followed by wins over Malaysia and Yemen in November, which secured Bahrain qualification for the 2015 Asian Cup. Hudson was listed as a potential candidate as coach of Denmark in October.

In January 2014, Hudson led Bahrain to a third-place finish at the 2014 WAFF Championship. After 0–0 draws against Oman and Iraq, Bahrain made the semi-finals of the tournament due to a drawing of lots. Bahrain lost their semifinal 1–0 to Jordan, and earned their third-place finish via a penalty shootout after 0–0 draw against Kuwait. In February 2014, Hudson signed a two-year contract extension as Bahrain manager. On July 27, 2014, Hudson resigned as manager of Bahrain.

=== New Zealand All Whites ===
In August 2014, Hudson was appointed manager of the New Zealand national football team. After resigning from his position with Bahrain, Hudson moved to New Zealand for the full-time role which also includes responsibilities in overseeing the programme of the country's age-group representative sides. Both New Zealand national under-20 football team and New Zealand national under-17 football team made history by making into knockout stages of their respective World Cups in the same cycle for the first time. Hudson's first game in charge of the national team was a 3–1 defeat away to Uzbekistan in September 2014.

In 2015, All Whites defeated Oman in a 1–0 victory. Hudson also took the coaching reins of the New Zealand U23 who won all three of their pool games and their semi final without conceding a goal in their Oceania Olympic Qualifiers at the Pacific Games in July 2015, but were disqualified (and had their semi final win overturned) for fielding an ineligible player due to an administrative error from the national body. This incident led to Hudson losing players for selection for his preparation for his matches against Myanmar and Oman as the national body continued their detailed review of the internal processes and eligibility information for all players.

In January 2016, Hudson hit out on the national body over lack of games as the national body failed to find a fixture against suitable opposition for the All Whites in the March FIFA window. Hudson's squad assembled for the first time for the year in May, for a two-week training camp in Australia, ahead of the 2016 OFC Nations Cup hosted in Papua New Guinea. Despite having to change the team due to national body's "administrative error" losing players who were no longer eligible, as well as a lack of matches organised from the national body, the All Whites won the 2016 OFC Nations Cup, winning four matches with the final being won via a penalty shootout after a 0–0 draw against Papua New Guinea, conceding one goal throughout the competition, from a penalty, in the process. New Zealand's victory saw them crowned Oceania champions making New Zealand the most successful national team in the competition's history, having won the tournament five times, and also saw them qualify for the 2017 FIFA Confederations Cup in Russia.

In September 2016, Hudson appointed former England player and England Under-21 , manager Peter Taylor as his assistant coach. When appointed Peter Taylor praised the progress made by the All Whites under Hudson, who had previously worked with Taylor in Bahrain. In October 2016, after two away games against Mexico and USA (a 2–1 loss and a 1–1 draw, respectively), former All Whites' captain Ryan Nelsen said the team had gone up a level under Hudson and he had "never seen New Zealand teams play this way". Hudson was also linked to the manager's position at Derby County and Norwich City and reportedly turned down job for MK Dons. Hudson denied that he was approached by Derby County, stating there had been "no approach or contact between him and Derby".

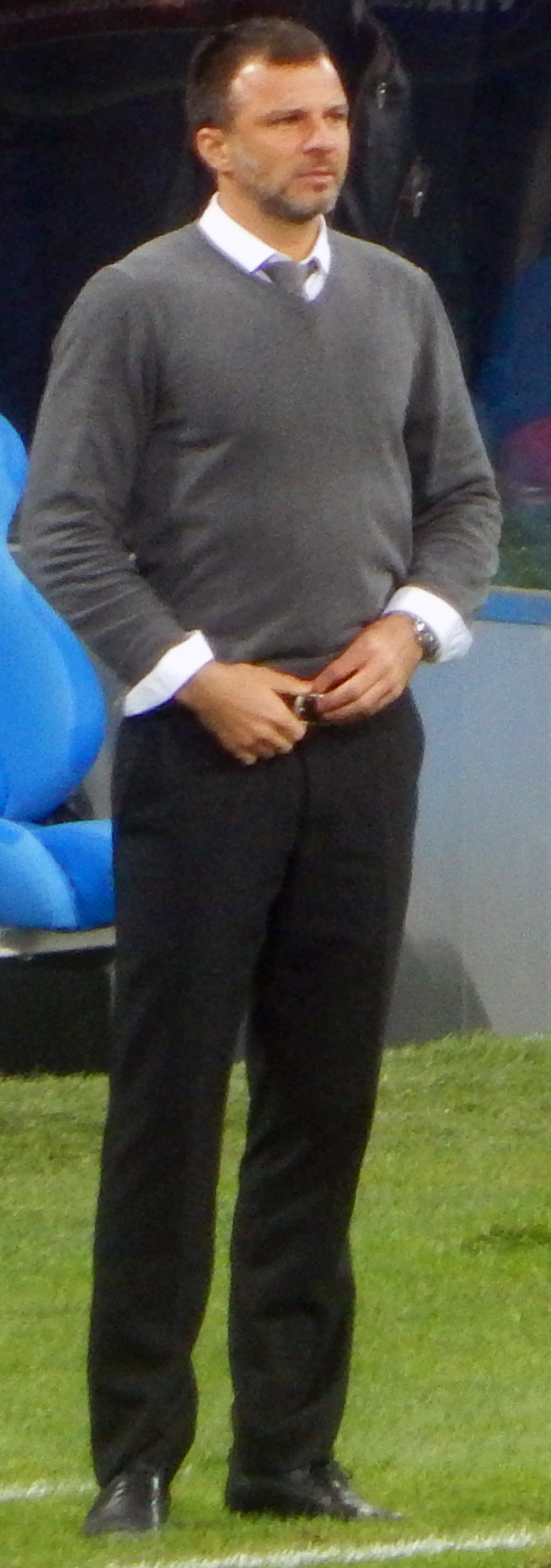
Hudson with New Zealand national football team in 2017

In March 2017, Hudson led the All Whites into the Round 3 Play-Off Final by securing top spot in Group A of the third stage of Oceania World Cup Qualifiers. During the All Whites' preparation for World Cup Qualifiers against Fiji, Tommy Smith, senior player, praised the professionalism of the national team's set-up. Hudson made an inaccurate statement regarding the statistics of the All Whites records. Hudson's statement, "losing one game in two years" and "scoring 26 goals, conceding 5", was in fact including the New Zealand U23's record, games he has coached in his campaign for New Zealand, and taking the All Whites' two-year run from after their March 31, 2015, match against South Korea.

In June 2017, Hudson led the All Whites to 2017 FIFA Confederations Cup as the lowest ranked team, 95th at the time, in the tournament. Their first match was against the hosts Russia, where they were beaten 0–2. Their second match against Mexico was a close one as they took the lead, but their efforts ended in a 1–2 loss, thus earning their early exit along with Russia. Despite the exit, Portugal's manager, Fernando Santos, praised New Zealand as a "team that can surprise anyone" after their performances against Mexico. In the end, New Zealand finished Group A with a third defeat to European champions Portugal. In spite of this, Hudson was praised from overseas press, including Portugal and South Korea as well as from New Zealand captain Winston Reid, and player Ryan Thomas for constant "improvements" of the trainings and the environment.

In September 2017, New Zealand won the OFC Final against Solomon Islands. The All Whites won the home-and-away tie on an aggregate score of 8–3 to win the OFC Qualifiers and qualify for the Inter-continental play-offs qualifier against the fifth-ranked nation from South America, Peru. This match represented New Zealand's first home match to be played against a "top-100 nation" in the last three and a half years, unprecedented for any international team.

In November 2017, Hudson took his team into two-legged intercontinental playoff against Peru, world's 10th ranked team at the time, for a place at the 2018 FIFA World Cup in Russia. After a 0–0 draw in Wellington, Peru beat New Zealand 2–0 in Lima, qualifying for the World Cup on aggregate over the two legs. Hudson later announced his resignation as All Whites coach after not qualifying for the World Cup, despite a desire from NZ Football chief executive Andy Martin for him to stay. Following Hudson's departure, Martin described Hudson as one of the best coaches NZF has had and he would leave behind a professional standard that NZF had never had before.

As part of a High Performance Sport NZ programme, Hudson also spent time with All Blacks' coaches, Steve Hansen and long-time assistant Wayne Smith, as well as Crusaders coach Scott Robertson. Hudson has close relationship with Hansen as All Blacks previously shared time with him and the All Whites.

=== Colorado Rapids ===
On November 29, 2017, Hudson was announced as the new coach of the Colorado Rapids in Major League Soccer. At 36, Hudson became the youngest head coach in Colorado Rapids' history, as well as the youngest head coach in the 2018 MLS season. In his first season in charge, Hudson led the Rapids to nine consecutive losses across all competitions, including a loss to lower division United Soccer League side Nashville SC in the U.S. Open Cup.

On May 1, 2019, the Rapids announced that they had relieved Hudson of his duties following comments made in the media post the Atlanta United game where he was quoted,

"We are fighting at the bottom with a bottom group of players and we have to find a way to pick up results whilst also being a team that tries to play a certain way. And we just have to find that balance. The only way it's going to be a quick fix is if you wave a magic wand at it and throw lots of money at it. Clearly we're not doing that. I'll go back to this: Every single game we go into, whether it's Nani, whether it's [Wayne] Rooney, whether it's [Lucho] Acosta — every single week there are players in this league making a difference and the gap in quality is huge … There are teams with a lot more quality than us. And that's what we're competing against. And no one talks about it."

Hudson's comments were related to his team being the only team in the league with one marquee player, goalkeeper Tim Howard, whereas other teams had two or three marquee players.

Hudson has since explained that he has cleared things up with the players, they understood what he meant and that his comments came out wrong, especially since there's a cultural difference in how England managers talk.

After Hudson was relieved of his duties, the Rapids named assistant coach Conor Casey as his interim replacement. Hudson ended his tenure in Denver with an 8–26–9 record as the statistical worst coach in Rapids history at the time.

=== United States ===
In January 2021, Hudson joined the United States national team as assistant to manager Gregg Berhalter.

Under their leadership, the United States national team defeated Mexico 3–2 after extra time in the final to become the first champions of the 2021 CONCACAF Nations League on June 6, 2021.

The United States national team was then also crowned champions of the 2021 CONCACAF Gold Cup Final on August 1, 2021, after defeating Mexico 1–0 before a sold-out crowd at Allegiant Stadium in Paradise, NV.

After qualifying for the 2022 FIFA World Cup following a 2–0 loss to Costa Rica in the final match of CONCACAF qualifying at Estadio Nacional in San Jose, Costa Rica, the United States national team's run at the 2022 FIFA World Cup in Qatar ended after the Netherlands defeated the US 3-1 in the round of 16.

On January 4, 2023, Hudson was named interim manager of the United States national team, following the expiration of previous manager Gregg Berhalter's contract with U.S. Soccer. In a press release, the federation announced that Hudson would be responsible for selecting and managing the roster for the January 2023 camp and associated friendlies against Serbia and Colombia.

The USMNT qualified for the 2023 CONCACAF Gold Cup following their 7–1 win over Grenada in Group D of League A of the 2022-23 CONCACAF Nations League.

Hudson stepped down from his interim position on May 30, 2023, and departed the US Soccer organization to take an undisclosed new opportunity. B. J. Callaghan was named as his replacement, maintaining the interim tag.

=== Al-Markiyah SC ===
Hudson signed with Qatar Stars League Al-Markiyah SC at the start of the 2023/24 season. After three league matches, Hudson moved into a technical advisory role, leaving his position as manager by mutual consent with the club. As of April 2024, he became a free agent.

=== Al Arabi SC ===
In September 2024, Hudson signed with Qatar Stars League Al Arabi SC, replacing Younes Ali as Al Arabi's head coach, and starting his Al Arabi stint with an Ooredoo Stars League (OSL) game against Al Ahli at Al Thumama Stadium on Sunday, September 22, 2024 in a 3–3 draw.

=== BG Pathum United ===
In February, 2025, Hudson became a new head coach of the club replacing an interim coach Supachai Komsilp. His first match was ASEAN Club Championship against Terengganu FC from Malaysia.

=== Thailand ===
On 22 October 2025, Hudson was appointed by Football Association of Thailand (FA Thailand) as the head coach of Thailand national team, following the sacking of Masatada Ishii.

== Personal life ==
Apart from his native English, Hudson also speaks Spanish.

During the end of his soccer career and the start of his management career, Hudson sought out help from Alcoholics Anonymous which aided him to quit in 2005. Hudson has been sober since and has volunteered in prisons and hospitals in the US, UK, and New Zealand, helping people with drinking problems.

In May 2019, Hudson founded the Forgotten Dogs Foundation, aimed at helping homeless dogs find a safe haven. The foundation holds soccer clinics and tournaments as fundraisers.

== Managerial statistics ==
As of match played 17 November 2026

Managerial record by team and tenure
Team	Nat.	From	To	Record					Ref.
Team	Nat.	From	To	G	W	D	L	Win %	Ref.
Real Maryland Monarchs	(United States)	1 October 2008	30 June 2010	45	13	11	21	28.89	
Newport County	(Wales)	1 April 2011	28 September 2011	18	5	5	8	27.78	
Bahrain U23	(Bahrain)	21 March 2012	1 August 2014	10	6	2	2	60.00	
Bahrain	(Bahrain)	13 August 2013	1 August 2014	12	3	6	3	25.00	
New Zealand U23	(New Zealand)	1 August 2014	23 November 2017	4	3	0	1	75.00	
New Zealand	(New Zealand)	1 August 2014	23 November 2017	27	9	7	11	33.33	
Colorado Rapids	(United States)	29 November 2017	1 May 2019	46	8	10	28	17.39	
United States	(United States)	4 January 2023	30 May 2023	5	2	2	1	40.00	
Al-Markhiya	(Qatar)	1 July 2023	22 October 2023	5	2	1	2	40.00	
Al Arabi SC	(Qatar)	19 September 2024	11 December 2024	11	5	2	4	45.45	
BG Pathum United	(Thailand)	3 February 2025	4 April 2025	12	7	3	2	58.33	
Thailand	(Thailand)	22 October 2025	Present	19	12	4	3	63.16	
Career Total				214	75	53	86	35.05	

== Managerial achievements ==
Real Marylands

- United Soccer Leagues Play-offs: 2009

Bahrain

- WAFF Championship: Bronze medal (2014)

Bahrain U23

- GCC U-23 Championship: 2013
- GCC U-23 Championship: Runners-up (2012)

New Zealand

- OFC Nations Cup: 2016
- 2018 FIFA World Cup qualification OFC Finals winner

United States (assistant)

- CONCACAF Nations League: 2019–20
- CONCACAF Gold Cup: 2021

Thailand

- FIFA ASEAN Cup: Runners-up (2026)
- ASEAN Championship: Runners-up (2026)
- King’s Cup: 2026
