= 2013 GCC U-23 Championship =

البطولة الخليجية للمنتخبات تحت 23 سنة لكرة القدم (in Arabic)

Tournament details
- Host country: Bahrain
- Dates: 15–26 August
- Teams: 6 (from 1 confederation)
- Venue: 1 (in 1 host city)

Final positions
- Champions: Bahrain (1st title)
- Runners-up: Saudi Arabia
- Third place: Kuwait
- Fourth place: Oman

Tournament statistics
- Matches played: 10
- Goals scored: 22 (2.2 per match)
- Top scorer: (Saudi Arabia) Saleh Al-Amri (3 goals)
- Best player: (Bahrain) Sayed Jaafar Ahmed
- Best goalkeeper: (Bahrain) Ashraf Waheed

The 2013 GCC U-23 Championship was the fifth edition of the GCC U-23 Championship. It took place in Riffa, Bahrain for the first time. Six nations took part. The competition was held in Riffa from 15 to 26 August. The hosts Bahrain won their first title after defeating title holders Saudi Arabia 1–0 in the final.

The 2013 edition was officially known as the Huawei GCC National Teams Under-23 Championship owing to sponsorship by Huawei.

== Teams ==
Team	Previous appearances in tournament (Note: Bold indicates champion for that year. Italic indicates host for that year.)
Bahrain (host)	4 (2008, 2010, 2011, 2012)
Kuwait	4 (2008, 2010, 2011, 2012)
Qatar	4 (2008, 2010, 2011, 2012)
Oman	4 (2008, 2010, **2011**, 2012)
Saudi Arabia	4 (**2008**, 2010, 2011, **2012**)
United Arab Emirates	3 (**2010**, 2011, 2012)

== Venues ==
2013 GCC U-23 Championship is located in Bahrain	Riffa
2013 GCC U-23 Championship is located in Bahrain	Bahrain National Stadium
2013 GCC U-23 Championship is located in Bahrain	Capacity: **24,000**

== Group stage ==
=== Group A ===
Pos	Team	Pld	W	D	L	GF	GA	GD	Pts	Qualification
1	Bahrain (H)	2	2	0	0	4	2	+2	**6**	Advance to knockout stage
2	Kuwait	2	0	1	1	3	4	−1	**1**	Advance to knockout stage
3	United Arab Emirates	2	0	1	1	1	2	−1	**1**	

Source: kooora
Rules for classification: Group stage tiebreakers
(H) Hosts
15 August 2013
19:00

United Arab Emirates	0–1	Bahrain
		Al-Dakheel 20'

Bahrain National Stadium, Riffa
Referee: Khamis Al Kuwari (Qatar)

17 August 2013
19:00

Kuwait	1–1	United Arab Emirates
Al-Shereedah 65'		Ali 50'

Bahrain National Stadium, Riffa
Referee: Sami Al-Nemri (Saudi Arabia)

19 August 2013
19:00

Bahrain	3–2	Kuwait
Shallal 20'; Helal 30', 72'		Al-Fahad 25'; Al Shammari 75'

Bahrain National Stadium, Riffa
Referee: Yasser Al-Rawahi (Oman)

=== Group B ===
Pos	Team	Pld	W	D	L	GF	GA	GD	Pts	Qualification
1	Saudi Arabia	2	2	0	0	3	0	+3	**6**	Advance to knockout stage
2	Oman	2	1	0	1	3	2	+1	**3**	Advance to knockout stage
3	Qatar	2	0	0	2	0	4	−4	**0**	

Source: kooora
Rules for classification: Group stage tiebreakers
16 August 2013
19:00

Saudi Arabia	1–0	Qatar
Al-Amri 32'	Report

Bahrain National Stadium, Riffa
Referee: Jameel Juma Abdulhusain (Bahrain)

18 August 2013
19:00

Oman	0–2	Saudi Arabia
	Report	Kanno 68'; Al-Ibrahim 87'

Bahrain National Stadium, Riffa
Referee: Ali Taleb (Kuwait)

20 August 2013
19:00

Qatar	0–3	Oman
		Abdul-Hadi 14'; Nasib 79'; Al-Hasani 90+4'

Bahrain National Stadium, Riffa
Referee: Adel Al Naqbi (United Arab Emirates)

== Knockout stage ==
In the knockout stage, extra time and penalty shoot-out were to be used to decide the winner if necessary (Regulations Articles 10.1 and 10.3).

=== Bracket ===
Semi-finals
22 August – Riffa
**Bahrain**	**2**
Oman	0
23 August – Riffa
**Saudi Arabia**	**3**
Kuwait	2

Final
26 August – Riffa
**Bahrain**	**1**
Saudi Arabia	0
Third place match
25 August – Riffa
Oman	0 (3)
**Kuwait (p)**	**0 (4)**

=== Semi-finals ===
22 August 2013
19:00

Bahrain	2–0	Oman
Shahin 66'; Ahmed 86'

Bahrain National Stadium, Riffa
Referee: Sami Al-Nemri (Saudi Arabia)

23 August 2013
19:00

Saudi Arabia	3–2	Kuwait
Al-Amri 16', 37'; A. Al-Ghamdi 53'	Report	Sayer 64'; Al Shammari 70'

Bahrain National Stadium, Riffa
Referee: Khamis Al Kuwari (Qatar)

=== Third place play-off ===
25 August 2013
19:00

Oman	0–0	Kuwait
Penalties
	3–4

Bahrain National Stadium, Riffa
Referee: Jameel Juma Abdulhusain (Bahrain)

=== Final ===
26 August 2013
19:00

Bahrain	1–0	Saudi Arabia
Jameel 32' (pen.)	Report

Bahrain National Stadium, Riffa
Referee: Yasser Al-Rawahi (Oman)

==== Winners ====
2013 GCC U-23 Championship champion

**Bahrain**
**First title**

== Awards ==
The following awards were given at the conclusion of the tournament:

Top Goalscorers	Most Valuable Player	Best goalkeeper
(Saudi Arabia) Saleh Al-Amri	(Bahrain) Sayed Jaafar Ahmed	(Bahrain) Ashraf Waheed

== Goalscorers ==
There have been 22 goals scored in 10 matches, for an average of 2.2 goals per match.

3 goals

- (Saudi Arabia) Saleh Al-Amri

2 goals

- (Bahrain) Abdulla Yusuf Helal
- (Kuwait) Abdul Rahman Al Shammari

1 goal

- (Bahrain) Sayed Jaafar Ahmed
- (Bahrain) Hamad Al-Dakheel
- (Bahrain) Hassan Jameel
- (Bahrain) Mohammed Shahin
- (Bahrain) Abdulla Shallal
- (Kuwait) Mohammed Al-Fahad
- (Kuwait) Shereedah Al-Shereedah
- (Kuwait) Faraj Sayer
- (Oman) Abdullah Abdul-Hadi
- (Oman) Sami Al-Hasani
- (Oman) Badar Nasib Bamasila
- (Saudi Arabia) Abdulrahman Al-Ghamdi
- (Saudi Arabia) Ibrahim Al-Ibrahim
- (Saudi Arabia) Mohamed Kanno
- (United Arab Emirates) Salem Ali Ibrahim
