= 2012 GCC U-23 Championship =

البطولة الخليجية للمنتخبات تحت 23 سنة لكرة القدم (in Arabic)

Tournament details
- Host country: Qatar
- Dates: 1–11 September
- Teams: 6 (from 1 confederation)
- Venue: 1 (in 1 host city)

Final positions
- Champions: Saudi Arabia (2nd title)
- Runners-up: Bahrain
- Third place: United Arab Emirates
- Fourth place: Qatar

Tournament statistics
- Matches played: 11
- Goals scored: 28 (2.55 per match)
- Top scorer: (Saudi Arabia) Abdulrahman Al-Ghamdi (4 goals)
- Best player: (Saudi Arabia) Mustafa Basas
- Best goalkeeper: (United Arab Emirates) Ahmed Shambih

The 2012 GCC U-23 Championship was the fourth edition of the GCC U-23 Championship. It took place in Doha, Qatar for the third consecutive time. Six nations took part. The competition was held in Doha from 1 to 11 September. Saudi Arabia won their second title after defeating Bahrain 2–0 in the final.

The group stage draw was held on 30 June 2012.

== Teams ==
Team	Previous appearances in tournament (Note: Bold indicates champion for that year. Italic indicates host for that year.)
Bahrain	3 (2008, 2010, 2011)
Kuwait	3 (2008, 2010, 2011)
Qatar (host)	3 (2008, 2010, 2011)
Oman	3 (2008, 2010, **2011**)
Saudi Arabia	3 (**2008**, 2010, 2011)
United Arab Emirates	2 (**2010**, 2011)

== Venues ==
2012 GCC U-23 Championship is located in Qatar	Doha
2012 GCC U-23 Championship is located in Qatar	Aspire Academy Stadium
2012 GCC U-23 Championship is located in Qatar	Capacity: **5,580**

== Group stage ==
=== Group A ===
Pos	Team	Pld	W	D	L	GF	GA	GD	Pts	Qualification
1	Qatar (H)	2	1	1	0	4	3	+1	**4**	Advance to knockout stage
2	United Arab Emirates	2	1	1	0	3	2	+1	**4**	Advance to knockout stage
3	Kuwait	2	0	0	2	3	5	−2	**0**	

Source: kooora
Rules for classification: Group stage tiebreakers
(H) Hosts
1 September 2012
16:00

Qatar	1–1	United Arab Emirates
Al-Khalaqi 80'	Report	Khalifah 17'

Aspire Academy Stadium, Doha

3 September 2012
18:30

United Arab Emirates	2–1	Kuwait
Sabeel 61'; Saeed 74'	Report	Al-Khamees 56'

Aspire Academy Stadium, Doha

5 September 2012
18:30

Kuwait	2–3	Qatar
Al Shammari 23', 88'		Al-Yazidi 19', 21', 90+3'

Aspire Academy Stadium, Doha

=== Group B ===
Pos	Team	Pld	W	D	L	GF	GA	GD	Pts	Qualification
1	Saudi Arabia	2	1	1	0	4	1	+3	**4**	Advance to knockout stage
2	Bahrain	2	1	0	1	1	3	−2	**3**	Advance to knockout stage
3	Oman	2	0	1	1	1	2	−1	**1**	

Source: kooora
Rules for classification: Group stage tiebreakers
1 September 2012
18:30

Oman	1–1	Saudi Arabia
Salem 44'	Report	Al-Shehri 72'

Aspire Academy Stadium, Doha

3 September 2012
16:00

Bahrain	1–0	Oman
Rashid 71'

Aspire Academy Stadium, Doha

5 September 2012
16:00

Saudi Arabia	3–0	Bahrain
Al-Ghamdi 12'; Bassas 20'; Al-Qattam 83'

Aspire Academy Stadium, Doha

== Knockout stage ==
In the knockout stage, extra time and penalty shoot-out were to be used to decide the winner if necessary (Regulations Articles 10.1 and 10.3).

=== Bracket ===
Semi-finals
8 September – Doha
Qatar	2 (2)
**Bahrain (p)**	**2 (4)**
8 September – Doha
**Saudi Arabia**	**3**
United Arab Emirates	0

Final
11 September – Doha
Bahrain	0
**Saudi Arabia**	**2**
Third place match
10 September – Doha
Qatar	0 (2)
**United Arab Emirates (p)**	**0 (3)**

=== Fifth place play-off ===
7 September 2012
17:00

Kuwait	1–2	Oman
Al Shammari 6'

Aspire Academy Stadium, Doha

=== Semi-finals ===
8 September 2012
16:30

Qatar	2–2	Bahrain
Alaaeldin 45+2'; Al-Khalaqi 74'		Rashid 64'; Ghloum 88' (pen.)
Penalties
	2–4

Aspire Academy Stadium, Doha

8 September 2012
18:45

Saudi Arabia	3–0	United Arab Emirates
Al-Ghamdi 3', 18'; Al-Muwallad 77'	Report

Aspire Academy Stadium, Doha

=== Third place play-off ===
10 September 2012
17:00

Qatar	0–0	United Arab Emirates
Penalties
	2–3

Aspire Academy Stadium, Doha

=== Final ===
11 September 2012
17:00

Bahrain	0–2	Saudi Arabia
	Report	Al-Ghamdi 18'; Al-Shehri 53'

Aspire Academy Stadium, Doha

==== Winners ====
2012 GCC U-23 Championship champion

**Saudi Arabia**
**Second title**

== Awards ==
The following awards were given at the conclusion of the tournament:

Top Goalscorers	Most Valuable Player	Best goalkeeper
(Saudi Arabia) Abdulrahman Al-Ghamdi	(Saudi Arabia) Mustafa Bassas	(United Arab Emirates) Ahmed Shambih

== Goalscorers ==
There have been 28 goals scored in 11 matches, for an average of 2.55 goals per match.

4 goals

- (Saudi Arabia) Abdulrahman Al-Ghamdi

3 goals

- (Kuwait) Abdul Rahman Al Shammari
- (Qatar) Saleh Al-Yazidi

2 goals

- (Bahrain) Ahmed Rashid Hassan
- (Oman) ???
- (Qatar) Saoud Al-Khalaqi
- (Saudi Arabia) Ahmed Al-Shehri

1 goal

- (Bahrain) Mujtaba Ghloum
- (Kuwait) Shaheen Al-Khamees
- (Oman) Khalifa Salem
- (Qatar) Ahmed Alaaeldin
- (Saudi Arabia) Fahad Al-Muwallad
- (Saudi Arabia) Khaled Al-Qattam
- (Saudi Arabia) Mustafa Bassas
- (United Arab Emirates) Muhain Khalifah
- (United Arab Emirates) Mohammed Sabeel
- (United Arab Emirates) Yousif Saeed

== See also ==
- Arabian Gulf Cup
- Arab Gulf Cup Football Federation
