= 2010 GCC U-23 Championship =

البطولة الخليجية للمنتخبات تحت 23 سنة لكرة القدم (in Arabic)

Tournament details
- Host country: Qatar
- Dates: 28 July – 7 August
- Teams: 6 (from 1 confederation)
- Venue: 1 (in 1 host city)

Final positions
- Champions: United Arab Emirates (1st title)
- Runners-up: Kuwait
- Third place: Oman
- Fourth place: Qatar

Tournament statistics
- Matches played: 11
- Goals scored: 16 (1.45 per match)
- Top scorer(s): (United Arab Emirates) Ahmed Khalil (5 goals)
- Best player: (United Arab Emirates) Amer Abdulrahman
- Best goalkeeper: (Kuwait) Hussain Kankone

The 2010 GCC U-23 Championship was the second edition of the GCC U-23 Championship. It took place in Doha, Qatar for the first time. Six nations took part. The competition was held in Doha from 28 July to 7 August 2010. United Arab Emirates won their first title after defeating Kuwait 1–0 in the final.

United Arab Emirates made their debut in the competition and won their first title. The format of the competition was changed to include a knockout round.

== Teams ==
Team	Previous appearances in tournament (Note: Bold indicates champion for that year. Italic indicates host for that year.)
Bahrain	1 (2008)
Kuwait	1 (2008)
Qatar (host)	1 (2008)
Oman	1 (2008)
Saudi Arabia	1 (**2008**)
United Arab Emirates	0 (debut)

== Venues ==
2010 GCC U-23 Championship is located in Qatar	Doha
2010 GCC U-23 Championship is located in Qatar	Aspire Academy Stadium
2010 GCC U-23 Championship is located in Qatar	Capacity: **5,580**

== Group stage ==
=== Group A ===
Pos	Team	Pld	W	D	L	GF	GA	GD	Pts	Qualification
1	Oman	2	2	0	0	4	0	+4	**6**	Advance to knockout stage
2	Qatar (H)	2	0	1	1	0	2	−2	**1**	Advance to knockout stage
3	Bahrain	2	0	1	1	0	2	−2	**1**	

Source: kooora
Rules for classification: Group stage tiebreakers
(H) Hosts
28 July 2010
17:30

Qatar	0–2	Oman
		Al-Qasmi 36'; Al-Nuaimi 90+4' (pen.)

Aspire Academy Stadium, Doha

30 July 2010
17:30

Bahrain	0–2	Oman
		Al-Shimli 10'; Al-Nuaimi 82' (pen.)

Aspire Academy Stadium, Doha

1 August 2010
20:15

Qatar	0–0	Bahrain
Penalties
	6–5

Aspire Academy Stadium, Doha

Since both Qatar and Bahrain finished level on points, goal difference and goals scored, a penalty shootout was held to determine who finishes in second.

=== Group B ===
Pos	Team	Pld	W	D	L	GF	GA	GD	Pts	Qualification
1	United Arab Emirates	2	1	1	0	2	1	+1	**4**	Advance to knockout stage
2	Kuwait	2	0	2	0	2	2	0	**2**	Advance to knockout stage
3	Saudi Arabia	2	0	1	1	1	2	−1	**1**	

Source: kooora
Rules for classification: Group stage tiebreakers
28 July 2010
20:00

Saudi Arabia	1–1	Kuwait
Al-Johani 13'	Report	Aman 20'

Aspire Academy Stadium, Doha

30 July 2010
20:00

United Arab Emirates	1–0	Saudi Arabia
Khalil 86'

Aspire Academy Stadium, Doha

1 August 2010
17:30

Kuwait	1–1	United Arab Emirates
Nasser 53'		Khalil 36'

Aspire Academy Stadium, Doha

== Knockout stage ==
In the knockout stage, extra time and penalty shoot-out were to be used to decide the winner if necessary (Regulations Articles 10.1 and 10.3).

=== Bracket ===
Semi-finals
4 August – Doha
Oman	0 (4)
**Kuwait (p)**	**0 (5)**
4 August – Doha
**United Arab Emirates**	**3**
Qatar	1

Final
7 August – Doha
Kuwait	0
**United Arab Emirates**	**1**
Third place match
6 August – Doha
**Oman (p)**	**1 (4)**
Qatar	1 (2)

=== Fifth place play-off ===
3 August 2010
16:30

Bahrain	0–0	Saudi Arabia
Penalties
	3–4

Aspire Academy Stadium, Doha

=== Semi-finals ===
4 August 2010
16:30

Oman	0–0	Kuwait
Penalties
	4–5

Aspire Academy Stadium, Doha

4 August 2010
20:00

United Arab Emirates	3–1	Qatar
Khalil 33', 67'; Saleh 90+3'		Al-Ansari 90'

Aspire Academy Stadium, Doha

=== Third place play-off ===
6 August 2010
16:30

Oman	1–1	Qatar
Said 46'		Salah 71'
Penalties
	4–2

Aspire Academy Stadium, Doha

=== Final ===
7 August 2010
17:30

Kuwait	0–1	United Arab Emirates
	Report	Khalil 33'

Aspire Academy Stadium, Doha

==== Winners ====
2010 GCC U-23 Championship champion

**United Arab Emirates**
**First title**

== Awards ==
The following awards were given at the conclusion of the tournament:

Top Goalscorers	Most Valuable Player	Best goalkeeper
(United Arab Emirates) Ahmed Khalil	(United Arab Emirates) Amer Abdulrahman	(Kuwait) Hussain Kankone

== Goalscorers ==
There have been 16 goals scored in 11 matches, for an average of 1.45 goals per match.

5 goals

- (United Arab Emirates) Ahmed Khalil

2 goals

- (Oman) Mansoor Al-Nuaimi

1 goal

- (Kuwait) Hamad Aman
- (Kuwait) Yousef Nasser
- (Oman) Yaqoob Al-Qasmi
- (Oman) Nasser Al-Shimli
- (Oman) Qasim Said
- (Qatar) Abdulaziz Al-Ansari
- (Qatar) Ahmed Salah
- (Saudi Arabia) Fahad Al-Johani
- (United Arab Emirates) Haboush Saleh

== See also ==
- Arabian Gulf Cup
- Arab Gulf Cup Football Federation
