= Amer Abdulrahman =

Emirati footballer (born 1989)

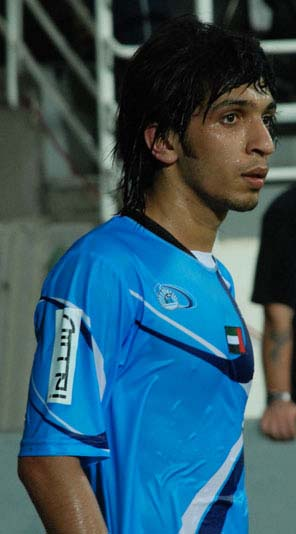

Personal information
- Full name: Amer Abdul Rahman Abdullah; Hussein Al Hamadi
- Date of birth: 3 July 1989 (age 37)
- Place of birth: Abu Dhabi, United Arab Emirates
- Height: 1.68 m (5 ft 6 in)
- Position: Central midfielder

Youth career
- 1998–2006: Baniyas

Senior career*
Years	Team	Apps	(Gls)
2006–2016	Baniyas	107	(8)
2016–2019	Al Ain	50	(2)
2019–2021	Al Jazira	7	(1)
2021–2022	Baniyas	17	(1)

International career^{‡}
2004–2009	United Arab Emirates U20	39	(0)
2010–2012	United Arab Emirates U23	19	(3)
2009–2019	United Arab Emirates	76	(2)
- * Club domestic league appearances and goals as of 2 November 2016 ‡ National team caps and goals as of 29 January 2019

Amer Abdul Rahman Abdullah Hussein Al Hamadi (Arabic: عامر عبد الرحمن عبد الله حسين الحمادي; born 3 July 1989), commonly known as Amer Abdulrahman, is an Emirati footballer who plays as a central midfielder for the UAE national team.

== Early life ==
Amer was born and raised in Bani Yas, Abu Dhabi, to his parent Abdul Rahman. He has five brothers and three sisters. At the age of six, Amer started playing volleyball for Al Jazira, and continued to play for three years until the age of nine. He then switched to football; this was largely due to his neighbor, Salem Al Mansouri, who kept telling him to play football since he was exceptional at it. Salem enrolled him to play for Baniyas before dying, and from that day on has followed Salem's dream for Amer and grew into the game to be one of the UAE's top players.

== Club career ==
=== Baniyas ===
==== 2009–10 season ====
After helping his side to win promotion in 2008–09, Amer made his Pro League debut on 17 October 2009, In a 1–2 away win against Al Nasr Dubai, where he provided an assist for teammate Papa Georges to score the winning goal. On 30 October, provided two assists in a 2–4 away win over Ajman. He provided another assist in a 5–3 away loss from Al Jazira.

On 7 January 2010, Bani Yas announced extended the contract of Amer until 2015. On 2 February, Amer won Al Hadath Al Riyadi Young Arab Player of the Year. On 18 March, he scored his first Pro-league goal in a 1–1 draw with Al Jazira. On 28 February in the Etisalat Cup against Al Shabab, he provided an assist for Saleh Al Menhali in a 1–5 away victory. On 22 April, he helped in two goal in a 4–1 victory over Al Dhafra. On 28 April, Amer confirmed to Al Ittihad that he had received offers from Arsenal, Stuttgart, Anderlecht and local clubs. Amer reject the offers and decided to stay with Bani Yas.

==== 2010–11 season ====
Amer began this season, On 28 August 2010, by provided an assist for André Senghor in a 0–1 win over Al Shabab. On 26 September, Amer assisted Haboush Saleh the first goal from a throw. On 21 October, he assisted and helped in two goal in a 1–4 victory over Dubai. On 13 December, Amer assisted and helped in another two goal and scored his first goal of this season in a 5–3 win over Al Sharjah.

On 16 May 2011, Amer scored his second goal from a penalty kick and provided an assist for Mustafa Karim to score the second goal, in a 2–0 victory over Dubai. He followed with another goal against Al Sharjah on 28 May. Amer finished the 2010–11 season with 3 goals and 5 assists in all competitions.

==== 2011–12 season ====
Amer scored his first goal of the season on 22 October 2011, in a 1–2 home loss against Al Wasl. He provided an assist for Yousif Jaber on 28 October against Al Jazira in a 3–1 away loss. On 22 November, he provided two assists in a 4–1 victory over Emirates. He provided an assist for André Senghor to give Bani Yas a 1–2 away win against Dubai.

On 5 January, Amer continued his good form with provided another assist from free kick for Yousif Jaber against Al Ahli in a 1–3 home loss. On 13 April, after came on as a substitute for Fareed Ismail in the 53rd minute, he provided an assist for André Senghor from a corner kick in a 2–2 draw with Al Nasr. On 11 May, Amer add another assist in a 6–4 loss against Al Ahli. On 16 May, Amer scored his first Champions League goal for Bani Yas in a 2–0 home win against Pakhtakor, to lead the club to reach the Round of 16. He assisted two in a 2–2 draw with Al Sharjah. He finished the season with 9 assists in 22 matches.

==== 2012–13 season ====
In his third league appearance on 4 October, Amer assisted André Senghor the equalizing goal to level the score at 1–1, and Yousif Jaber the winning goal from a free kick to give Bani Yas a 2–3 away win against Dubai.

On 15 February 2013, Amer provided an assist for Haboush Saleh to score the fifth goal after individual skill in the box, in a Bani Yas 5–0 home victory over Dubai. On 26 February, Amer helped in a goal and assisted Yousif Jaber as Bani Yas defeated by Al Faisaly 3–4 in the GCC Champions League. On 3 March, he assisted Fawaz Awana the opening goal in a 1–2 away win over Dibba Al Fujairah. He added another assist in a 1–1 draw with Al Wahda. On 23 April, Bani Yas through to the semi-finals of the GCC Champions League in a 4–3 penalty shoot-out win against Al Muharraq (1–1 a.e.t.), Amer scored the first penalty, on the right of goalkeeper Sayed Jaffar. On 12 May against Al Ain, Amer set up the equalizing goal for André Senghor's header with a floated cross from the right on a 2–2 tie at Tahnoun bin Mohammed Stadium. Amer finished the season by lifting GCC Champions League with Bani Yas, after a 3–1 aggregate win over Qatari club Al Khor.

=== Blackburn Rovers ===
On 19 July 2013, it was confirmed by numerous sources that Amer would undergo a two-week trial at Championship outfit Blackburn Rovers. Rovers manager Gary Bowyer said the club are just looking at Abdulrahman, as well as a number of others. On 3 August, Amer returned from Blackburn trial and was back in training with his club Bani Yas.

=== Al Ain ===
On 2 July, Amer was officially presented as an Al Ain player at the press conference on a three-year contract for an undisclosed transfer fee. He made his debut for the team in the AFC Champions League on 23 August, against Lokomotiv Tashkent.

== International career ==
Amer made his debut with national teams, when he was selected for United Arab Emirates national under-17 team at international tournament in 2006. He won the AFC U-19 Championship 2008 with United Arab Emirates national under-20 team, he was also part of the squad at the 2009 FIFA U-20 World Cup in Egypt. In 2010, he helped the Olympic team win the 2010 GCC U-23 Championship in the Qatar, and was named Player of the Tournament. In the same year he won a silver medal at the Asian Games in China.

Amer made his international debut on 12 November 2009, in a friendly match against Manchester City at the age of 20. when he came on as a substitute at the beginning of the second half. He scored his first senior goal in a friendly match against Grödig on 3 July 2011. He appeared for UAE at the 2012 Summer Olympics, playing in all three of their games.

== Career statistics ==
=== Club ===
As of 2 November 2016

Club	Season	League				Cup			UPC			GCC			ACL			Total		
Club	Season	Division	Apps	Goals	Assists	Apps	Goals	Assists	Apps	Goals	Assists	Apps	Goals	Assists	Apps	Goals	Assists	Apps	Goals	Assists
Baniyas
Baniyas	2006–07	Division 1 Group A	8	0	—	—			—			—			—			8	0	—
Baniyas	2007–08	Division 1 Group A	15	2	—	—			—			—			—			15	2	—
Baniyas	2008–09	Division 1 Group A	17	0	—	—			—			—			—			17	0	—
Baniyas	Total		40	2	—	—			—			—			—			40	2	—
Baniyas	2009–10	Arabian Gulf League	18	1	4	1	0	1	1	0	1	—						20	1	5
Baniyas	2010–11	Arabian Gulf League	17	3	5	0	0	0	1	0	0	—						18	3	5
Baniyas	2011–12	Arabian Gulf League	15	1	9	1	0	0	2	0	0	—			4	1	0	22	2	9
Baniyas	2012–13	Arabian Gulf League	17	0	7	1	0	0	2	0	0	6	0	0	—			26	0	7
Baniyas	2013–14	Arabian Gulf League	3	0	1	0	0	0	0	0	0	—			0	0	0	3	0	1
Baniyas	2014–15	Arabian Gulf League	18	1	4	0	0	0	2	1	0	—						20	2	4
Baniyas	2015–16	Arabian Gulf League	19	2	7	1	0	0	3	1	0	—						23	3	7
Al Ain		Arabian Gulf League																		
Al Ain	2016–17	Arabian Gulf League	5	0	0	0	0	0	0	0	0	0	0	0	4	0	0	9	0	0
Al Ain	Total		112	8	37	4	0	1	11	2	1	6	0	0	8	1	0	141	11	38
Career total			152	10	37	4	0	1	11	2	1	6	0	0	8	1	0	181	13	38

=== International ===
Appearances and goals by national team and year
National team	Year	Apps	Goals	Assists
United Arab Emirates	2009	2	0	0
United Arab Emirates	2010	3	0	1
United Arab Emirates	2011	10	0	3
United Arab Emirates	2012	6	1	0
United Arab Emirates	2013	11	0	6
United Arab Emirates	2014	10	0	2
United Arab Emirates	2015	15	0	6
United Arab Emirates	2016	6	0	1
United Arab Emirates	2017	2	0	0
United Arab Emirates	2018	9	0	0
United Arab Emirates	2019	4	0	0
Total		78	1	19

Scores and results list United Arab Emirates's goal tally first, score column indicates score after each Abdulrahman goal.

List of international goals scored by Amer Abdulrahman
No.	Date	Venue	Opponent	Score	Result	Competition
1	25 December 2012	Khalifa International Stadium, Doha, Qatar	Yemen	1–0	2–0	Friendly

== Honours ==
Baniyas

- UAE Division 2 Group A: 2008–09
- GCC Champions League: 2012–13

United Arab Emirates U19

- AFC U-19 Championship: 2008

United Arab Emirates U23

- GCC U-23 Championship: 2010
- Asian Games Silver Medal: 2010

United Arab Emirates

- Arabian Gulf Cup: 2013
- AFC Asian Cup third-place: 2015

Individual

- Al Hadath Al Riyadi Young Arab player of the Year: 2010
- GCC U-23 Championship Player of the Tournament: 2010
