= Ahmed Khalil (footballer, born 1991) =

Emirati footballer (born 1991)

Personal information
- Full name: Ahmed Khalil Sebait Mubarak Al-Junaibi
- Date of birth: 8 June 1991 (age 35)
- Place of birth: Sharjah, United Arab Emirates
- Height: 1.79 m (5 ft 10 in)
- Position: Forward

Team information
- Current team: Al-Ittifaq

Youth career
- 2001–2006: Shabab Al Ahli

Senior career*
Years	Team	Apps	(Gls)
2006–2017	Shabab Al Ahli	184	(65)
2017–2018	Al Jazira	2	(0)
2018	Al Ain	9	(4)
2018–2022	Shabab Al Ahli	45	(24)
2022–2025	Al Bataeh	38	(3)
2026–	Al-Ittifaq	0	(0)

International career^{‡}
2004–2006	United Arab Emirates U17	7	(6)
2006–2010	United Arab Emirates U20	15	(13)
2010–2014	United Arab Emirates U23	14	(14)
2008–2020	United Arab Emirates	105	(48)
Medal record
Men's football
Representing United Arab Emirates
Asian Games
Silver medal – second place	2010 Guangzhou	Team competition
AFC Asian Cup
Bronze medal – third place	2015 Australia	Team competition
- * Club domestic league appearances and goals as of 8 March 2026 ‡ National team caps and goals as of 29 November 2024

Ahmed Khalil Al-Junaibi (Arabic: أحمد خليل سبيت مبارك الجنيبي; born 8 June 1991) is an Emirati professional footballer who plays as a forward for UAE First Division League club Al-Ittifaq.

In 2006, Ahmed won the 2006 GCC U-17 Championship with UAE U17, in which he was top scorer with five goals. Later in the same years, he joined the first team. The following season with Al-Ahli, Ahmed won his first club honour, the President Cup, and was the top scorer with four goals. In 2008, Ahmed won Super Cup and his first Pro-League 2008–09, and with UAE U20 won the AFC U-19 Championship 2008, and was named player of the tournament and the top scorer with four goals. He was named the most promising Arab Player of the Year by Al-Ahram and Al Hadath magazines and also Asian Young Footballer of the Year. In 2009, Ahmed led UAE U20 to the Quarter-finals in the 2009 FIFA U-20 World Cup, and scored two goals in the tournament, and was named for the second consecutive time Al-Ahram Most promising Arab player of the Year and nominee of the Asian Young Footballer of the Year for two times. In 2010, Ahmed continued his outstanding performance, by leading UAE Olympic football team to win the 2010 GCC U-23 Championship by scoring five goals in the tournament and win the top scorer, and for the first ever football silver medal in UAE history at the Asian Games and scored three goals in the tournament. He was named the Best Young Athlete Player of the Year by Mohammed Bin Rashid Al Maktoum Creative Sports Award.

Ahmed won the Asian Footballer of the Year in 2015 after leading his club to the final of the AFC Champions League and UAE to the third-place in the 2015 AFC Asian Cup.

== Early life ==
Ahmed was born on 8 June 1991 in Sharjah, descended from a family of footballers. His father, Khalil Sebait, is a former player for an old football club during his time in Kuwait and his brothers Fahd, Fouad (Retired), Faisal, Fathi, Mohamed, and finally Ahmed, all of whom played for Al Ahli.

== Club career ==
=== Al Ahli ===
Ahmed started his career in the Red Fort at the age of eight, and included in the youth teams until he reached the first team, in the middle of the 2006–07 season under French coach Alan Michel On 13 May 2007, (at 16 years) in 89 min and 3 sec, Ahmed scored his first goal for the club and in the league, in a 4–1 victory over Al Wahda.

==== 2009–10 season ====
On 18 March 2010, Ahmad scored his first hat-trick of the season against Al-Nasr SC. The match ended a 4–2 win for Al Ahli. On 30 March 2010, against Al-Hilal in the AFC Champions League, Khalil scored a goal in the 42nd minute, before the end of the first half. The game ended 3–2 to Al-Hilal.

===== Negotiations with Portsmouth =====
On 24 June 2009 news spread that Khalil will move to the Premier League after what Sulaiman Al-Fahim said that Portsmouth is in need the services of Khalil.

==== 2010–11 season ====
On 26 August 2010, Ahmed start the season with a 2–0 defeat against Al Dhafra in his first match. On 2 September 2010, Ahmed scored his first goal in this season in a 4–1 victory over arch rivals Al Wasl. His goalscoring run ended after this match. On 24 September 2010, Ahmed assisted teammate Ahmad Khamis against Al Jazira which ended in a 2–2 draw, He once again assisted teammate Ahmad Khamis to score a goal in a 3–1 win against Dubai on 15 October 2010. After his absence from the scoring for a five games he back to score against Al Sharjah with a free kick on a 2–1 win. In the last match in 2010 he assisted teammate Pinga in a 1–0 win against Baniyas. His first goal in 2011 came against Al Jazira with a penalty kick on a 5–1 away loss. He continued his goalscoring in the next fixture against Dubai on a 2–1 away loss. After two games without goalscoring, he scored the tie goal 1–1 against Al Sharjah in a 2–3 away victory.

==== 2011–12 season ====
Ahmed started the season with Al Ahli by beating Kazma 1–0 in the first leg of the GCC Champions League Semi-final.

=== Al Jazira ===
Starting from summer 2017, Ahmed joined Al Jazira Club on a free transfer deal.

== International career ==
Ahmed is one of the few who have played for 3 national team at the same time, (U-20, U-23 and UAE). He has been playing for the U-20 since he was just 15 in 2006, and has made over 70 appearances for UAE at junior levels (U-17, U-19, U-20 and U-23), as well as 13 appearances for the senior team.

The beginning of Ahmed with national teams was with under-17 by winning the 2006 GCC U-17 Championship in the Saudi Arabia. And he won the Golden Boot after scoring 5 goals in 5 matches of 5 Uae's matches in the tournament. In 2008, in Dammam, Saudi Arabia, with under-20, he was part of a team that won the 2008 AFC U-19 Championship and was a factor by scoring two winning goals in the final against Uzbekistan. He was named Player of the tournament and awarded the Golden Boot with four goals. A year later, he led the under-20 to the quarter-final in 2009 FIFA U-20 World Cup and he scored two goal, one against Honduras with a free kick in the 41st minute, and one against Venezuela in the 83rd minute a pass from teammate Ahmed Ali. Perhaps his most successful year was the 2010, in which he led the Olympic team to win the 2010 GCC U-23 Championship and was the top scorer with five goals of 4 matches. After only two months, he came back to lead the Olympic team for the first ever football silver medal in UAE history at Asian Games, and scored three goals, one against Bangladesh in the 3–0 victory and two in a 0–3 victory over Uzbekistan.

=== 2010 AFC U-19 Championship ===
On 4 October 2010, Ahmed played against Japan and scored a last-minute draw goal but the match ended in 2–1 loss, In second match was against Jordan ended 0–0, In his third and final Group match, Ahmed scored a hat-trick in a 4–0 win against Vietnam. In the quarter-finals, against Australia with the score at 1–0 for Australia, he won a penalty and turned the match to draw 1–1, again he turn the match to a 2–2 draw in the last minutes, the match went to extra times but ended with a 4–2 win. Ahmed scored six of his side's seven tournament goals, an amazing feat that cemented him as the runner-up for the tournament Golden Boot.

=== 2011 AFC Asian Cup ===
On 11 January 2011, Ahmed played his first official match in international competition in UAE 0–0 draw with North Korea, he tried to help the attack to score but couldn't, and Al Kathiri came on as a substitute for Ahmed in the 77th minute. In his second game against Iraq, his form was too bad and the match ended in a 1–0 loss. On the third and last group stage match UAE were eliminated from the Asian Cup with a 3–0 loss against Iran. Ahmed failed to make an impact in the Asian Cup; his performance was so disappointing and did not score any goal.

=== 2012 Summer Olympics ===
He was included in Mahdi Ali's squad to participate in 2012 Summer Olympics in the country's first appearance. He played his first match against Uruguay; however, the match ended 1–2 in favor of Uruguay. He also played UAE's next matches against Great Britain and Senegal which ended 1–3 and 1–1. UAE finished at the bottom of the group and Khalil failed to score in the tournament.

=== 2015 AFC Asian Cup ===
Khalil was named in United Arab Emirates' final squad for 2015 AFC Asian Cup, held in Australia. He started in UAE's opener match against Qatar and scored two goals at their 4–1 win. He scored the first goal when Qatar was led the game 1–0 and scored the second 20 minutes later. At the end, he was named as man of the match and is the second top scorer of the tournament behind his teammate Ali Mabkhout.

=== 2018 FIFA World Cup qualification ===
On 3 September 2015, Khalil scored four goals, in a 10–0 defeat of Malaysia in a 2018 FIFA World Cup qualifier.

== Career statistics ==
=== Club ===
As of 25 December 2024.

Club	Season	League			Cup^{1}			Gulf			Asia			Club World Cup			Total		
Club	Season	Apps	Goals	Assists	Apps	Goals	Assists	Apps	Goals	Assists	Apps	Goals	Assists	Apps	Goals	Assists	Apps	Goals	Assists
Al Ahli	2006–07	4	4	-	—			—			—			—					
Al Ahli	2007–08	14	5	-				—			—			—					
Al Ahli	2008–09	9	1	-				—			4	1	0	—					
Al Ahli	2009–10	17	11	-				—			6	2	0						
Al Ahli	2010–11	18	5	-				3	0	0	—			—					
Al Ahli	2011–12	12	2	-				—			—			—					
Al Ahli	2012–13	18	4	-				—			—			—					
Al Ahli	2013–14	23	9	0				—			6	1	0	—					
Al Ahli	2014–15	24	5	3				—			14	6	4	—					
Al Ahli	2015–16	25	7	4				—						—					
Al Ahli	2016–17	20	12	2				—			5	0	0	—					
Al Ahli	Total	184	65																
Al Jazira	2017–18	2	0	0	0	0	0	—			0	0	0	0	0	0	2	0	0
Al Jazira	Total	2	0	0	0	0	0	0	0	0	0	0	0	0	0	0	2	0	0
Al Ain	2017–18	9	4	0	5	3	0	—			7	2	0	0	0	0	21	9	0
Al Ain	Total	9	4	0	5	3	0	0	0	0	7	2	0	0	0	0	21	9	0
Shabab Al Ahli	2018–19	20	9	5				—											
Shabab Al Ahli	2019–20	16	13	2				—			6	0	0						
Shabab Al Ahli	2020–21	5	2	1				—											
Shabab Al Ahli	2021–22	4	0	0	1	0		—											
Shabab Al Ahli	Total	45	24	8														121	
Al Bataeh	2022–23	7	0	0	3	2	0	—			0	0	0	0	0	0	10	2	0
Al Bataeh	2023–24	18	2	0	2	0		—									20	2	0
Al Bataeh	2024–25	8	1	0	1	0		—									9	1	0
Al Bataeh	Total	33	3	0	5	2	0	0	0	0	0	0	0	0	0	0	39	5	0
Career total																			

^{1}Other tournaments include the President Cup and Etisalat Cup, Etisalat Super Cup

=== International ===
As of 29 November 2019

United Arab Emirates national team
Year	Apps	Goals
2008	7	0
2009	5	1
2010	5	3
2011	12	6
2012	3	0
2013	13	8
2014	15	5
2015	13	14
2016	11	6
2017	7	2
2018	6	1
2019	8	2
Total	105	48

=== International goals ===
As of 29 January 2019
Scores and results list the United Arab Emirates' goal tally first.

Goal	Date	Venue	Opponent	Score	Result	Competition
1.	21 January 2009	KLFA Stadium, Kuala Lumpur	Malaysia	5–0	5–0	2011 AFC Asian Cup qualification
2.	5 January 2010	Maktoum Bin Rashid Al Maktoum Stadium, Dubai	Malaysia	1–0	1–0	2011 AFC Asian Cup qualification
3.	29 May 2010	Sportzentrum Anif	Moldova	3–2	3–2	Friendly
4.	7 September 2010	Al Nahyan Stadium, Abu Dhabi	Kuwait	1–0	3–0	Friendly
5.	17 July 2011	Sheikh Khalifa International Stadium, Al Ain	Lebanon	1–0	6–2	Friendly
6.	17 July 2011	Sheikh Khalifa International Stadium, Al Ain	Lebanon	2–0	6–2	Friendly
7.	17 July 2011	Sheikh Khalifa International Stadium, Al Ain	Lebanon	5–1	6–2	Friendly
8.	25 August 2011	Sheikh Khalifa International Stadium, Al Ain	Qatar	2–0	3–1	Friendly
9.	25 August 2011	Sheikh Khalifa International Stadium, Al Ain	Qatar	3–0	3–1	Friendly
10.	2 September 2011	Tahnoun bin Mohammed Stadium, Al Ain	Kuwait	2–3	2–3	2014 FIFA World Cup qualification
—	29 December 2012	Khalifa International Stadium, Doha	Yemen	1–0	3–1	Unofficial friendly
11.	11 January 2013	Khalifa Sports Stadium, Isa Town	Oman	1–0	2–0	21st Arabian Gulf Cup
12.	11 January 2013	Khalifa Sports Stadium, Isa Town	Oman	2–0	2–0	21st Arabian Gulf Cup
13.	15 January 2013	Bahrain National Stadium, Riffa	Kuwait	1–0	1–0	21st Arabian Gulf Cup
14.	6 February 2013	Mỹ Đình National Stadium, Hanoi	Vietnam	1–0	2–1	2015 AFC Asian Cup qualification
15.	22 March 2013	Mohammed Bin Zayed Stadium, Abu Dhabi	Uzbekistan	1–1	2–1	2015 AFC Asian Cup qualification
16.	5 September 2013	King Fahd International Stadium, Riyadh	Trinidad and Tobago	3–0	3–3	2013 OSN Cup
17.	9 September 2013	King Fahd International Stadium, Riyadh	New Zealand	1–0	2–0	2013 OSN Cup
—	9 October 2013	Shenzhen Universiade Sports Centre, Shenzhen	Malaysia	1–0	3–1	Unofficial friendly
—	9 October 2013	Shenzhen Universiade Sports Centre, Shenzhen	Malaysia	2–0	3–1	Unofficial friendly
18.	19 November 2013	Mohammed Bin Zayed Stadium, Abu Dhabi	Vietnam	5–0	5–0	2015 AFC Asian Cup qualification
19.	6 November 2014	Prince Saud bin Jalawi Stadium, Khobar	Lebanon	1–0	3–2	Friendly
20.	6 November 2014	Prince Saud bin Jalawi Stadium, Khobar	Lebanon	2–0	3–2	Friendly
21.	6 November 2014	Prince Saud bin Jalawi Stadium, Khobar	Lebanon	3–1	3–2	Friendly
22.	23 November 2014	King Fahd International Stadium, Riyadh	Saudi Arabia	1–2	2–3	22nd Arabian Gulf Cup
23.	23 November 2014	King Fahd International Stadium, Riyadh	Saudi Arabia	2–2	2–3	22nd Arabian Gulf Cup
24.	11 January 2015	Canberra Stadium, Canberra	Qatar	1–1	4–1	2015 AFC Asian Cup
25.	11 January 2015	Canberra Stadium, Canberra	Qatar	4–1	4–1	2015 AFC Asian Cup
26.	30 January 2015	Newcastle Stadium, Newcastle	Iraq	1–0	3–2	2015 AFC Asian Cup
27.	30 January 2015	Newcastle Stadium, Newcastle	Iraq	2–2	3–2	2015 AFC Asian Cup
28.	3 September 2015	Mohammed Bin Zayed Stadium, Abu Dhabi	Malaysia	3–0	10–0	2018 FIFA World Cup qualification
29.	3 September 2015	Mohammed Bin Zayed Stadium, Abu Dhabi	Malaysia	5–0	10–0	2018 FIFA World Cup qualification
30.	3 September 2015	Mohammed Bin Zayed Stadium, Abu Dhabi	Malaysia	8–0	10–0	2018 FIFA World Cup qualification
31.	3 September 2015	Mohammed Bin Zayed Stadium, Abu Dhabi	Malaysia	10–0	10–0	2018 FIFA World Cup qualification
32.	8 October 2015	King Abdullah Sports City, Jeddah	Saudi Arabia	1–0	1–2	2018 FIFA World Cup qualification
33.	12 November 2015	Mohammed Bin Zayed Stadium, Abu Dhabi	Timor-Leste	3–0	8–0	2018 FIFA World Cup qualification
34.	12 November 2015	Mohammed Bin Zayed Stadium, Abu Dhabi	Timor-Leste	4–0	8–0	2018 FIFA World Cup qualification
35.	12 November 2015	Mohammed Bin Zayed Stadium, Abu Dhabi	Timor-Leste	6–0	8–0	2018 FIFA World Cup qualification
36.	12 November 2015	Mohammed Bin Zayed Stadium, Abu Dhabi	Timor-Leste	7–0	8–0	2018 FIFA World Cup qualification
37.	17 November 2015	Shah Alam Stadium, Selangor	Malaysia	2–0	2–1	2018 FIFA World Cup qualification
38.	18 March 2016	Mohammed Bin Zayed Stadium, Abu Dhabi	Bangladesh	2–1	6–1	Friendly
39.	24 March 2016	Mohammed Bin Zayed Stadium, Abu Dhabi	Palestine	2–0	2–0	2018 FIFA World Cup qualification
40.	1 September 2016	Saitama Stadium 2002, Saitama	Japan	1–1	2–1	2018 FIFA World Cup qualification
41.	1 September 2016	Saitama Stadium 2002, Saitama	Japan	2–1	2–1	2018 FIFA World Cup qualification
42.	6 October 2016	Mohammed Bin Zayed Stadium, Abu Dhabi	Thailand	3–1	3–1	2018 FIFA World Cup qualification
43.	15 November 2016	Mohammed Bin Zayed Stadium, Abu Dhabi	Iraq	1–0	2–0	2018 FIFA World Cup qualification
44.	7 June 2017	Shah Alam Stadium, Selangor	Laos	2–0	4–0	Friendly
45.	29 August 2017	Hazza Bin Zayed Stadium, Al Ain	Saudi Arabia	2–1	2–1	2018 FIFA World Cup qualification
46.	22 March 2018	Rajamangala National Stadium, Bangkok	Slovakia	1–2	1–2	2018 King's Cup
47.	5 January 2019	Zayed Sports City Stadium, Abu Dhabi	Bahrain	1–1	1–1	2019 AFC Asian Cup
48.	21 January 2019	Zayed Sports City Stadium, Abu Dhabi	Kyrgyzstan	3–2	3–2 (a.e.t.)	2019 AFC Asian Cup

== Honours ==
=== Club ===
Al Ahli

- UAE Pro League: 3

2008–09, 2013–14, 2015–16

- UAE Super Cup: 4

2008, 2012, 2014, 2016

- UAE President's Cup: 2

2007–08, 2012–13

- UAE League Cup: 3

2012, 2014, 2017

- AFC Champions League finalist: 1

2015

Shabab Al Ahli

- UAE President Cup: 1

2018–19

- UAE League Cup: 1

2019

Al Ain

- UAE Pro League: 1

2017–18

- UAE President's Cup: 1

2017–18

=== International ===
- GCC U-17 Championship: 1

2006

- AFC U-19 Championship: 1

2008

- GCC U-23 Championship: 1

2010

- Asian Games Silver Medal: 1

2010

- Arabian Gulf Cup: 1

2013

- AFC Asian Cup third place: 1

2015

=== Individual ===
- GCC U-17 Championship top goalscorer: 1

2006

- UAE President Cup top goalscorer: 1

2007–08

- AFC U-19 Championship top goalscorer: 1

2008

- AFC U-19 Championship Player of the Tournament: 1

2008

- Asian Young Footballer of the Year: 1

2008

- GCC U-23 Championship top goalscorer: 1

2010

- Best Young Athlete Player of the Year: 1

2010

- Al-Ahram Most promising Arab player of the Year: 2

2008, 2009

- Al Hadath Most promising Arab player of the Year: 1

2008

- Asian Footballer of the Year: 1

2015

== See also ==
- List of men's footballers with 100 or more international caps

Awards and achievements
Preceded by Kim Kum-Il	AFC U-19 Championship Most Valuable Player; 2008	Succeeded by Jong Il Gwan
Preceded by Shim Young-Sung	AFC U-19 Championship Top Scorer; 2008	Succeeded by Kerem Bulut
Preceded by Nasser Al-Shamrani	Asian Footballer of the Year; 2015	Succeeded by Omar Abdulrahman
