= Mahmoud Dashti =

Kuwaiti footballer

Personal information
- Date of birth: August 24, 1994 (age 32)
- Place of birth: Dashti, Hormozgan, Iran
- Height: 1.80 m (5 ft 11 in)
- Positions: Winger; striker

Team information
- Current team: Al Arabi SC
- Number: 18

Youth career
- Al Arabi SC

Senior career*
Years	Team	Apps	(Gls)
2013–2017	Al Arabi SC	10	(1)

International career^{‡}
2012–2014	Kuwait U-21	6	(0)
2014–2015	Kuwait U-23	8	(2)
2014–2015	Kuwait	2	(0)
- * Club domestic league appearances and goals as of 8:51, June 3, 2014 (UTC) ‡ National team caps and goals as of January 28, 2015

Mahmoud Dashti (Arabic: مَحْمُود دَشْتِيّ; born 24 August 1993) is a football player playing for Al-Arabi SC in the Kuwaiti Premier League and Kuwait national football team playing as a winger and a striker.

== Youth years ==
Mahmoud was Playing football in Al Arabi SC since he was young with the under-14 team but didn't win any trophies or titles but stood out to be one of the best in the league and age division.

== Professional career ==
Mahmoud started his professional career with Al Arabi SC in 2013–14 season and was called up for the Kuwait national football team in the late 2014 of the season.

=== Al-Arabi SC ===
==== 2013–14 ====
Mahmoud made his debut vs Khaitan Sporting Club in an 8–0 Victory which he made 2 assists in the game he won the Kuwait Federation Cup vs Al-Salmiya SC which he was The Man Of The Match, He played his first Classico match vs Qadsia SC in the Emir Cup semi-final second leg which they lost 2–0 on penalties which ended his season with 4 assists and 1 goal.

==== 2014–15 ====
Mahmoud started the season with the Kuwait national football team to begin training early for the international cups and returned to Al-Arabi SC to start the season vs Kazma SC but did not play any games since start of the season only playing for the reserves. He won his second trophy with the team on December 14, 2014 after defeating Kuwait SC in the final 4–2 (aet) in the Kuwait Crown Prince Cup.

==== 2015–16 ====
At the start of the pre-season he got injured with Cut in cruciate ligament which made him miss most of the season. On January 27, 2016 he came back to Kuwait after a successful operation in Barcelona.

==== 2016–17 ====
At the beginning of the season in September he underwent surgery of Qdharov in his right knee, keeping him out of the green pitch for around 4 months.

== National career ==
=== Under-19 & 21 ===
Mahmoud started with Kuwait U-19 and played the Gulf Cup U-19. Then was called up for Kuwait U-21.

=== Kuwait national football team ===
Mahmoud was called up to the Kuwait national football team in late 2013–14 football season to compete in Arabian Gulf Cup and AFC Asian Cup.

After not making it to the team 23 man list Mahmoud was called up for the U-23 to compete in the 2015 GCC U-23 Championship. Kuwait lost the first match to UAE 2–0 where he was on the bench. After that he scored for in a win against Qatar 3–0. After losing the final to KSA 5–2.

== Personal life ==
Mahmoud got married at the age of 20 in early 2013.

== Career statistics ==
=== Club ===
As of 1 May 2015

Club	Season	League			Emir Cup		Kuwait Crown Cup		Continental		Other		Total	
Club	Season	Division	Apps	Goals	Apps	Goals	Apps	Goals	Apps	Goals	Apps	Goals	Apps	Goals
Al-Arabi SC	2013–14	VIVA Premier League	6	1	1	0	0	0	0	0	4	0	11	1
Al-Arabi SC	2014–15	VIVA Premier League	1	0	0	0	0	0	0	0	5	0	6	0
Al-Arabi SC	2015–16	VIVA Premier League	0	0	0	0	0	0	0	0	0	0	0	0
Al-Arabi SC	2016–17	VIVA Premier League	0	0	0	0	0	0	0	0	0	0	0	0
Total		VIVA Premier League	7	1	1	0	0	0	0	0	9	0	17	1

=== International ===
As of match played 25 May 2014.

National team	Year	Apps	Goals
Kuwait	2014	2	0
Kuwait	2015	0	0
Kuwait	2016	0	0
Total		2	0

== Honours ==
=== Club ===
Al Arabi SC:

- VIVA Premier League:(0)

(Runner-up):1 2014–15

- Kuwait Federation Cup (1): 2013–14
- Kuwait Crown Prince Cup (1):2014–15

(runner-up):1 2013–14

=== National ===
- GCC U-23 Championship:0

Runner Up 2015

=== Individual ===
- Al Arabi SC Under-19 player of the year: 2013
- VIVA Premier League 2014 Man of the Match: x1

== See also ==
- Al-Arabi SC
