= Ashraf Waheed Al Sebaie =

Bahraini footballer

Personal information
- Date of birth: 5 July 1991 (age 35)
- Place of birth: Bahrain
- Position: Goalkeeper

Team information
- Current team: Manama
- Number: 24

Senior career*
Years	Team	Apps	(Gls)
2011–	Manama		

International career^{‡}
2014–	Bahrain	4	(0)
- * Club domestic league appearances and goals as of 23 November 2017 ‡ National team caps and goals as of 23 November 2017

Ashraf Waheed Al Sebaie (born 5 July 1991) is a Bahraini professional footballer who plays as a goalkeeper for Manama. He was part of Bahrain's squad for the 2015 AFC Asian Cup.
