= Ahmed Al-Nahwi =

Qatari footballer (born 1991)

Personal information
- Full name: Ahmed Yousef Al-Nahwi
- Date of birth: 11 May 1991 (age 35)
- Place of birth: Qatar
- Position: Defender

Senior career*
Years	Team	Apps	(Gls)
2011–2014	Al Arabi	4	(0)
2014–2015	El Jaish	0	(0)
2015	→ Umm Salal (loan)	4	(0)
2015–2019	Al Arabi	18	(1)
2018	→ Al-Khor (loan)	3	(0)
2019–2020	Al-Shahania	2	(0)
2020–2021	Mesaimeer		
- * Club domestic league appearances and goals

Ahmed Al-Nahwi (Arabic: أحمد النحوي) (born 11 May 1991) is a Qatari footballer who plays as a defender. He played in the Qatar Stars League for Al Arabi, Umm Salal, Al-Khor and Al-Shahania.
