= Shafi Al-Dossari =

Saudi Arabian footballer

Personal information
- Full name: Shafi Hathal Al-Dossari
- Date of birth: 1 February 1990 (age 36)
- Place of birth: Saudi Arabia
- Height: 1.69 m (5 ft 7 in)
- Position: Left back

Senior career*
Years	Team	Apps	(Gls)
2010–2012	Al-Hilal	8	(0)
2012–2013	Al-Ittihad	6	(2)
2013–2016	Al-Fateh	18	(0)
2016–2017	Al-Khaleej	12	(0)
2017–2018	Ohod	1	(0)
- * Club domestic league appearances and goals as of 26 January 2017

Shafi Al-Dossari (Arabic: شافي الدوسري; born February 1, 1990) is a retired Saudi Arabian professional footballer who played as a left back. He is the son of former Al-Hilal striker Hathal Al-Dossari.
