= Faisel Al-Kharaa =

Saudi Arabian footballer (born 1993)

Personal information
- Full name: Faisel Ahmed Al-Kharaa
- Date of birth: December 5, 1993 (age 32)
- Place of birth: Al-Hasa, Saudi Arabia
- Height: 1.78 m (5 ft 10 in)
- Position: Right back

Team information
- Current team: Al-Entelaq

Youth career
- Hajer

Senior career*
Years	Team	Apps	(Gls)
2013–2015	Hajer		
2015–2020	Al-Ittihad	15	(0)
2016–2017	→ Al-Khaleej (loan)	19	(0)
2017–2018	→ Al-Taawon (loan)	4	(0)
2020–2022	Al-Jeel	48	(0)
2022–2023	Al-Sahel	24	(0)
2023–2024	Al-Jeel		
2024	Al-Noor		
2024–2025	Al-Thoqbah		
2025–	Al-Entelaq		
- * Club domestic league appearances and goals

Faisel Al-Kharaa (Arabic: فيصل الخراع; born 5 December 1993) is a Saudi Arabian footballer who plays for Al-Entelaq as a right back.

== Career ==
Al-Kharaa started his career at hometown club Hajer. During the 2013–14 season, Al-Kharaa helped them achieve promotion to the Pro League. On 23 July 2015, Al-Kharaa joined Al-Ittihad on a five-year deal. On 19 August 2016, Al-Kharaa joined Al-Khaleej on loan. On 26 May 2017, Al-Kharaa joined Al-Taawoun on loan. On 31 October 2020, Al-Kharaa joined First Division side Al-Jeel. He left the club following their relegation to the Second Division in the 2021–22 season. On 9 June 2022, he joined Al-Sahel. On 19 October 2023, Al-Kharaa joined Second Division side Al-Jeel. On 10 January 2024, Al-Kharaa joined Al-Noor.
