= Bahrain national under-23 football team =

Bahrain
- Nickname: Al-Ahmar (The Red)
- Association: Bahrain Football Association
- Confederation: AFC (Asia)
- Sub-confederation: WAFF (West Asia)
- Head coach: Vacant
- FIFA code: BHR
First colours	Second colours

AFC U-23 Asian Cup
- Appearances: 1 (first in 2020)
- Best result: Group stage (2020)

Football at the Asian Games
- Appearances: 4 (first in 2002)
- Best result: Quarter-Finals (2002)

The Bahrain national under-23 football team (also known as Bahrain under-23 or Bahrain Olympics team) represents Bahrain in international football competitions, GCC U-23 Championship, Football at the Summer Olympics, as well as other under-23 international football tournaments.

== Tournament records ==
=== Summer Olympics record ===
Since 1992, football at the Summer Olympics has changed into an under-23 tournament.

Olympics Record
Year	Round	Position	GP	W	D	L	GS	GA
(Spain) 1992	did not qualify							
(United States) 1996	did not qualify							
(Australia) 2000	did not qualify							
(Greece) 2004	did not qualify							
(China) 2008	did not qualify							
(United Kingdom) 2012	did not qualify							
(Brazil) 2016	did not qualify							
(Japan) 2020	did not qualify							

=== Asian Games record ===
Since 2002, football at the Asian Games has changed into an under-23 tournament.

Asian Games Record
Year	Round	GP	W	D	L	GS	GA
(South Korea) 2002	Quarter-Finals	4	2	0	2	10	6
(Qatar) 2006	Group Stage	3	2	0	1	7	3
(China) 2010	Group Stage	3	0	1	2	2	5
(South Korea) 2014	did not enter						
(Indonesia) 2018	Round of 16	4	1	1	2	5	11
Total	4/5	14	5	2	7	24	25

=== AFC U-23 Championship record ===
AFC U-23 Championship Record
Year	Round	GP	W	D	L	GF	GA
(Oman) 2013	did not qualify						
(Qatar) 2016	did not qualify						
(China) 2018	did not qualify						
(Thailand) 2020	Group Stage	3	0	2	1	3	8
(Uzbekistan) 2022	did not qualify						
(Qatar) 2024	did not qualify						
(Saudi Arabia) 2026	did not qualify						
(Japan) 2028	To be determined						
Total	1/8	3	0	2	1	3	8

=== GCC U-23 Championship record ===
GCC U-23 Championship Record
Year	Round	Position	GP	W	D	L	GS	GA
(Saudi Arabia) 2008	Final	Runner-up	4	2	1	1	6	4
(Qatar) 2010	Group Stage	6/6	3	0	2	1	0	2
(Qatar) 2011	Group Stage	5/6	3	1	1	1	2	5
(Qatar) 2012	Final	Runner-up	5	3	0	2	4	7
(Bahrain) 2013	Final	Champions	4	4	0	0	7	2
(Bahrain) 2015	Group Stage	5/6	3	1	1	1	4	3
Total	6/6	Best: Champions	22	11	5	6	23	23

== Recent fixtures and results ==
Win Draw Lose

== Current squad ==
The following 21 players were called up for the 2022 Asian Games.

No.	Pos.	Player	Date of birth (age)	Club
21	GK	Abdullah Al-Ahmad	9 April 2003 (age 23)	(Bahrain Football Association) Al-Riffa
22	GK	Salman Adel	5 April 2001 (age 25)	(Bahrain Football Association) Isa Town
25	GK	Khalil Ebrahim	2 May 2001 (age 25)	(Bahrain Football Association) Al-Tadamon
2	DF	Ahmed Dheyaa	17 August 2003 (age 23)	(Bahrain Football Association) East Riffa
3	DF	Abdullah Al-Khalasi	2 September 2003 (age 23)	(Bahrain Football Association) Al-Muharraq
4	DF	Hani Taha	18 December 2001 (age 24)	(Bahrain Football Association) Al-Hidd
6	DF	Hasan Isa	14 October 2001 (age 25)	(Bahrain Football Association) Al-Malkiya
8	DF	Mahmood Mohamed	11 November 2004 (age 22)	(Bahrain Football Association) Al-Shabab
12	DF	Ahmed Abdulhameed	7 June 2002 (age 24)	(Bahrain Football Association) Sitra
16	DF	Sayed Mohamed Adnan*	5 February 1983 (age 43)	(Bahrain Football Association) Al-Hidd
17	DF	Mohammed Qayoom	4 June 2001 (age 25)	(Bahrain Football Association) Al-Riffa
20	DF	Ali Mohamed Redha	27 November 2001 (age 24)	(Bahrain Football Association) Al-Shabab
5	MF	Ali Adnan Al-Banna*	21 July 1994 (age 32)	(Bahrain Football Association) Al-Muharraq
7	MF	Hasan Abdulnabi	25 March 2001 (age 25)	(Bahrain Football Association) Al-Shabab
10	MF	Mubarak Mohamed	18 August 2003 (age 23)	(Bahrain Football Association) Al-Muharraq
11	MF	Sayed Jawad Haider	7 January 2002 (age 24)	(Bahrain Football Association) Al-Shabab
15	MF	Husain Haroona	31 July 2001 (age 25)	(Bahrain Football Association) Al-Malkiya
19	MF	Salman Abdulla	7 February 2002 (age 24)	(Bahrain Football Association) Al-Riffa
9	FW	Husain Abdulkarim	17 May 2002 (age 24)	(Bahrain Football Association) Isa Town
13	FW	Abdulla Al-Subaie	22 August 2004 (age 22)	(Bahrain Football Association) Al-Hidd
18	FW	Abdullah Nemer	29 July 2002 (age 24)	(Bahrain Football Association) Al-Najma

* Over-aged player.

== Current staff ==
Role	Name
Head coach	Vacant
Assistant coach	(Bahrain) Isa Al Alawi
Assistant coach	(Bahrain) Khalid Abdulghafour
Assistant coach	(Bahrain) Salman Sharida
Goalkeeper coach	(Bahrain) Sayed Khamis
Youth coach	(Bahrain) Sulaiman Al Bulaihi
Analyst	(Bahrain) Ahmed Kamal

== Head-to-head record ==
The following table shows Bahrain's head-to-head record in the AFC U-23 Asian Cup.

Opponent	Pld	W	D	L	GF	GA	GD	Win %
Australia	1	0	1	0	1	1	+0	0.00
Iraq	1	0	1	0	2	2	+0	0.00
Thailand	1	0	0	1	0	5	−5	0.00
Total	3	0	2	1	3	8	−5	0.00

== See also ==
- Bahrain national football team
- Bahrain national under-17 football team
