= Haboush Saleh =

Emirati footballer (born 1989)

Personal information
- Full name: Haboush Saleh Habou Salbukh
- Date of birth: 13 July 1989 (age 37)
- Place of birth: Dubai, UAE
- Height: 1.67 m (5 ft 6 in)
- Position: Midfielder

Senior career*
Years	Team	Apps	(Gls)
2009–2019	Baniyas	136	(20)
2019–2022	Al-Wasl	35	(0)
2022–2023	Al Bataeh	11	(0)

International career
2010	United Arab Emirates U23	4	(0)
2012–2015	United Arab Emirates	18	(1)
- * Club domestic league appearances and goals as of 14 December 2014

Haboush Saleh Habou Salbukh (born 13 July 1989) is an Emirati professional footballer who plays as a midfielder.

== Career ==
Saleh kicked off his career in 2009 with Baniyas, and becoming a regular since then.

He made his international debut against New Zealand.

== Career statistics ==
=== International ===
Appearances and goals by national team and year
National team	Year	Apps	Goals
United Arab Emirates	2012	3	0
United Arab Emirates	2013	10	0
United Arab Emirates	2014	3	1
United Arab Emirates	2015	2	0
Total		18	1

Scores and results list The United Arab Emirates' goal tally first, score column indicates score after each Saleh goal.

List of international goals scored by Haboush Saleh
No.	Date	Venue	Opponent	Score	Result	Competition
1	30 December 2014	Robina Stadium, Gold Coast, Australia	Jordan	1–0	1–0	Friendly
