= Muhain Khalifah =

Emirati footballer (born 1994)

Personal information
- Full name: Muhain Khalifah Mihain
- Date of birth: 10 June 1994 (age 32)
- Place of birth: United Arab Emirates
- Height: 1.67 m (5 ft 5 1/2 in)
- Position: Midfielder

Youth career
- Al-Sharjah

Senior career*
Years	Team	Apps	(Gls)
2013–2019	Al-Sharjah	85	(3)
2021–2023	Ittihad Kalba	4	(0)
2022	→ Al Urooba (loan)	5	(0)
- * Club domestic league appearances and goals

Muhain Khalifah (Arabic:محين خليفة) (born 10 June 1994) is an Emirati footballer who plays as a midfielder, most recently for Al-Sharjah.
