= Saudi Arabia national under-23 football team =

Football team representing Saudi Arabia

Saudi Arabia Under-23 and Olympic Team
- Nickname(s): الصقور الخضر (The Green Falcons)
- Association: AFC (Asia)
- Head coach: Luigi Di Biagio
- Home stadium: King Fahd Sports City Stadium
- FIFA code: KSA
First colours	Second colours

Olympic Games
- Appearances: 3 (first in 1984)
- Best result: First Round (1984, 1996, 2020)

AFC U-23 Asian Cup
- Appearances: 7 (first in 2013)
- Best result: Champions (2022)

Asian Games
- Appearances: 3 (first in 2014)
- Best result: Quarter-finals (2014, 2018, 2022)

AGCFF U-23 Gulf Cup
- Appearances: 8 (first in 2008)
- Best result: Champions (2008, 2012, 2015, 2016, 2025)
- Website: Official Website

The Saudi Arabia national under-23 football team, also known as the Saudi Arabia Olympic football team, represents Saudi Arabia in Olympic football, the AFC U-23 Asian Cup, the AGCFF U-23 Gulf Cup, and other under-23 international competitions. The team is governed by the Saudi Arabian Football Federation.

== Results and fixtures ==
The following is a list of match results in the last 12 months, as well as any future matches that have been scheduled.

Win Draw Loss Fixture

== Coaching staff ==
As of

Position	Name	Ref.
Head coach	(Italy) Luigi Di Biagio	
Assistant coaches	(Italy) Fabrizio Piccareta	
Assistant coaches	(Albania) Ledian Memushaj	
Goalkeeping coach	(Saudi Arabia) Abdulrahman Al-Juraisan	
Fitness coach	(Italy) Daniele Nervi	
Video analyst	(Saudi Arabia) Jibril Al-Omairi	
Scout	(Saudi Arabia) Ayman Al-Faraj	
Scout	(Saudi Arabia) Thamer Sulaiman	
Physiotherapist	(Saudi Arabia) Mohand Mohamed Sulaimani	

== Players ==
=== Current squad ===
The following players were called up for the 2026 AFC U-23 Asian Cup, to be played in January 2026.

Caps and goals correct as of 13 June 2025, after the match against Denmark.

No.	Pos.	Player	Date of birth (age)	Caps	Goals	Club
1	GK	Turki Ba'al Jawsh	24 November 2003 (age 22)	5	0	(Saudi Arabian Football Federation) Al-Ettifaq
21	GK	Muhannad Al-Yahya	19 September 2004 (age 22)	0	0	(Saudi Arabian Football Federation) Al-Kholood
22	GK	Hamed Al-Shanqiti	26 April 2005 (age 21)	5	0	(Saudi Arabian Football Federation) Al-Ittihad
2	DF	Mohammed Abdulrahman	14 January 2003 (age 23)	3	0	(Saudi Arabian Football Federation) Al-Ahli
3	DF	Mohammed Al-Dossari	31 March 2003 (age 23)	10	0	(Saudi Arabian Football Federation) Al-Raed
4	DF	Mohammed Barnawi	7 August 2005 (age 21)	4	0	(Saudi Arabian Football Federation) Al-Ittihad
5	DF	Khalid Asiri	27 November 2004 (age 21)	4	0	(Saudi Arabian Football Federation) Al-Diriyah
12	DF	Salem Al-Najdi	27 January 2003 (age 23)	9	0	(Saudi Arabian Football Federation) Al-Nassr
13	DF	Sulaiman Hazazi	1 February 2003 (age 23)	6	0	(Saudi Arabian Football Federation) Al-Riyadh
14	DF	Awad Dahal	23 February 2005 (age 21)	0	0	(Saudi Arabian Football Federation) Al-Ettifaq
23	DF	Abdulrahman Al-Obaid	2 July 2004 (age 22)	2	0	(Saudi Arabian Football Federation) Al-Ittihad
6	MF	Faisal Al-Subiani	7 July 2003 (age 23)	2	0	(Saudi Arabian Football Federation) Al Shabab
7	MF	Abdulaziz Al-Aliwa	11 February 2004 (age 22)	6	0	(Saudi Arabian Football Federation) Al-Kholood
8	MF	Faris Al-Ghamdi	5 July 2003 (age 23)	0	0	(Saudi Arabian Football Federation) Al-Ettifaq
10	MF	Musab Al-Juwayr	20 June 2003 (age 23)	12	1	(Saudi Arabian Football Federation) Al-Qadsiah
15	MF	Bassam Hazzazi	29 March 2005 (age 21)	0	0	(Saudi Arabian Football Federation) Al-Nassr
16	MF	Yaseen Al-Zubaidi	26 April 2003 (age 23)	8	0	(Saudi Arabian Football Federation) Al-Ahli
18	MF	Rakan Al-Ghamdi	6 September 2005 (age 21)	4	0	(Saudi Arabian Football Federation) Al-Nassr
20	MF	Hammam Al-Hammami	30 January 2004 (age 22)	7	0	(Saudi Arabian Football Federation) Al Shabab
9	FW	Abdullah Radif	20 January 2003 (age 23)	20	12	(Saudi Arabian Football Federation) Al-Hilal
11	FW	Thamer Al-Khaibari	3 December 2005 (age 20)	0	0	(Saudi Arabian Football Federation) Neom
17	FW	Abdulrahaman Sufyani	15 April 2008 (age 18)	0	0	(Saudi Arabian Football Federation) Al-Nassr
19	FW	Majed Abdullah	13 February 2006 (age 20)	2	0	(Saudi Arabian Football Federation) Al Shabab

=== Recent call-ups ===
The following players have previously been called up to the Saudi Arabia under-23 squad in the last 12 months and remain eligible.

Pos.	Player	Date of birth (age)	Caps	Goals	Club	Latest call-up
DF	Mubarak Al-Rajeh	1 August 2003 (age 23)	5	0	(Saudi Arabia) Al Shabab	
DF	Mishal Al-Alaeli	17 June 2004 (age 22)	3	2	(Saudi Arabia) Al-Taawoun	
MF	Farhah Al-Shamrani	27 February 2006 (age 20)	0	0	(Saudi Arabia) Al-Riyadh	
MF	Abdulmalik Al-Oyayari	10 November 2003 (age 23)	8	0	(Saudi Arabia) Neom	
MF	Abdulmalik Al-Jaber	7 January 2004 (age 22)	7	3	(Saudi Arabia) Al-Nassr	
FW	Abdullah Matuq	2 April 2003 (age 23)	3	1	(Saudi Arabia) Al Shabab	
FW	Talal Haji	16 September 2007 (age 19)	3	0	(Saudi Arabia) Al-Riyadh	
^{INJ} Player withdrew from the squad due to an injury; ^{PRE} Preliminary squad; ^{SEN} Player withdrew from the squad due to a call up to the senior team; ^{SUS} Player suspended

=== Previous squads ===
Olympic Games

- 1996 Summer Olympics squads
- 2020 Summer Olympics squads

AFC U-23 Asian Cup

- 2013 AFC U-22 Championship squads
- 2016 AFC U-23 Championship squads
- 2018 AFC U-23 Championship squads
- 2020 AFC U-23 Championship squads
- 2022 AFC U-23 Asian Cup squads

Asian Games

- Football at the 2014 Asian Games squads
- Football at the 2018 Asian Games squads

WAFF U-23 Championship

- 2015 WAFF U-23 Championship squads
- 2021 WAFF U-23 Championship squads
- 2022 WAFF U-23 Championship squads

=== Overage players in Olympic Games ===
Tournament	Player 1	Player 2	Player 3
1996	Mohammed Al-Khilaiwi (DF)	Fuad Anwar (MF)	Hamzah Idris Falatah (FW)
2020	Yasser Al-Shahrani (DF)	Salman Al-Faraj (MF)	Salem Al-Dawsari (MF)

== Honours ==
- Arab Games
  - Gold medal (1): 2023
- AFC U-23 Asian Cup
  - Champions (1): 2022
- AGCFF U-23 Gulf Cup
  - Champions (5, record): 2008, 2012, 2015, 2016, 2025
- WAFF U-23 Championship
  - Champions (1): 2022
- Asian Games
  - Quarter-finals 2014, 2018, 2022

== Competitive record ==
=== Olympic Games ===
Summer Olympics record
Year	Round	Position	Pld	W	D*	L	GF	GA	Squad
(United Kingdom) 1908 to (South Korea) 1988	See Saudi Arabia senior team								
(Spain) 1992	did not qualify								
(United States) 1996	Group stage	15th	3	0	0	3	2	5	Squad
(Australia) 2000	did not qualify								
(Greece) 2004	did not qualify								
(China) 2008	did not qualify								
(United Kingdom) 2012	did not qualify								
(Brazil) 2016	did not qualify								
(Japan) 2020	Group stage	15th	3	0	0	3	4	8	Squad
(France) 2024	did not qualify								
(United States) 2028	to be determined								
(Australia) 2032	to be determined								
Total	Best: Group stage	2/8	6	0	0	6	6	13	—

*Denotes draws include knockout matches decided on penalty kicks.

=== AFC U-23 Asian Cup ===
AFC U-23 Asian Cup record									Qualification record					
Year	Round	Position	Pld	W	D*	L	GF	GA	Pld	W	D	L	GF	GA
(Oman) 2013	Runners-up	2nd	6	4	0	2	9	7	5	4	1	0	15	2
(Qatar) 2016	Group Stage	12th	3	0	2	1	5	6	4	3	1	0	9	1
(China) 2018	Group Stage	13th	3	0	2	1	2	3	3	2	0	1	11	3
(Thailand) 2020	Runners-up	2nd	6	4	1	1	5	2	3	2	1	0	9	1
(Uzbekistan) 2022	Champions	1st	6	5	1	0	13	0	2	1	0	1	4	2
(Qatar) 2024	Quarter-finals	8th	4	2	0	2	10	6	3	3	0	0	12	2
(Saudi Arabia) 2026	Group Stage	10th	3	1	0	2	3	4	Qualified as host					
(Japan) 2028	To be determined								To be determined					
Total	Best: Champions	7/8	31	16	6	9	47	28	20	15	3	2	60	11

*Draws include knockout matches decided via penalty shoot-out.

=== Islamic Solidarity Games ===
Football at the Islamic Solidarity Games record
Year	Round	Position	Pld	W	D	L	GF	GA
(Saudi Arabia) 2005	See Saudi Arabia national football team							
(Iran) 2010	Cancelled							
(Indonesia) 2013	Fourth place	4th	5	0	3	2	5	7
(Azerbaijan) 2017	Group stage	8th	3	0	0	3	0	6
(Turkey) 2021	Silver Medal	2nd	5	4	0	1	8	2
Total	Best: Silver Medal	3/3	13	4	3	6	13	15

=== Asian Games ===
Asian Games record
Year	Round	Position	Pld	W	D*	L	GF	GA	Squad
(India) 1951 to (Thailand) 1998	See Saudi Arabia senior team								
(South Korea) 2002	did not enter								
(Qatar) 2006	did not enter								
(China) 2010	did not enter								
(South Korea) 2014	Quarter-finals	6th	5	3	0	2	9	6	Squad
(Indonesia) 2018	Quarter-finals	8th	5	2	1	2	8	8	Squad
(China) 2022	Quarter-finals	8th	5	3	1	1	9	3	Squad
Total	Best: Quarter-finals	3/6	15	8	2	5	26	17	-

*Denotes draws include knockout matches decided via penalty shoot-out.

=== Gulf Cup under-23 ===
GCC U-23 Championship record
Year	Round	Position	Pld	W	D*	L	GF	GA
(Saudi Arabia) 2008	Champions	1st	4	3	1	0	7	2
(Qatar) 2010	Group Stage	5th	2	0	1	1	1	2
(Qatar) 2011	Third Place	3rd	4	3	0	1	11	5
(Qatar) 2012	Champions	1st	4	3	1	0	9	1
(Bahrain) 2013	Runners-up	2nd	4	3	0	1	6	3
(Bahrain) 2015	Champions	1st	4	2	1	1	11	8
(Qatar) 2016	Champions	1st	4	4	0	0	10	1
Total	Best: 4 titles	7/7	26	18	4	4	55	22

*Draws include knockout matches decided via penalty shoot-out.
**Gold background colour indicates that the tournament was won.
***Red border colour indicates tournament was held on home soil.

=== WAFF U-23 Championship ===
WAFF U-23 Championship record
Year	Round	Position	Pld	W	D*	L	GF	GA
(Qatar) 2015	Group Stage	5th	2	1	1	0	5	4
(Saudi Arabia) 2021	Runners-up	2nd	4	3	0	1	7	3
(Saudi Arabia) 2022	Champions	1st	4	3	0	1	8	4
(Iraq) 2023	Did not participate							
(Saudi Arabia) 2024	Hosts							
Total	Best: Champions	4/5	10	7	1	2	20	11

***Red border colour indicates tournament was held on home soil.

== See also ==
- Sport in Saudi Arabia
  - Football in Saudi Arabia
    - Women's football in Saudi Arabia
- Saudi Arabia national football team
- Saudi Arabia national under-20 football team
- Saudi Arabia national under-17 football team
- Saudi Arabia women's national football team
