= Abdulrahman Al-Shammari (footballer, born 1993) =

Kuwaiti footballer

Abdulrahman Al Shammari
Personal information
- Full name: Abdulrahman Al Shammari
- Date of birth: 13 February 1993 (age 33)
- Place of birth: Kuwait City, Kuwait
- Position: Forward

Youth career
- 2012–2014: Al-Nasr

Senior career*
Years	Team	Apps	(Gls)
2012–2017	Al-Nasr	122	(32)
2017	Al-Arabi	1	(0)

International career
2013–2015	Kuwait	4	(1)
- * Club domestic league appearances and goals

Abdulrahman "Bani" Al Shammari (born 13 February 1993) is a Kuwaiti footballer who plays for Al-Nasr SC as a striker.
