= Kuwait national under-23 football team =

Kuwait Under-23
- Nickname: Al-Azraq (The Blue)
- Association: Kuwait Football Association
- Confederation: AFC (Asia)
- Sub-confederation: WAFF (West Asia)
- Head coach: Emílio Peixe
- Captain: Abdulaziz Naji
- FIFA code: KUW
| First colours | Second colours |

Summer Olympics
- Appearances: 3 (first in 1980)
- Best result: Quarter-finals (1980)

AFC U-23 Asian Cup
- Appearances: 3 (first in 2013)
- Best result: Group stage (2013, 2022, 2024)

The Kuwait national under-23 football team is the youth association football team representing Kuwait in youth competitions and it is controlled by Kuwait Football Association. Kuwait under 23 Could also be called as Kuwait Olympic Team. Kuwait under 23 also represents its country in the Olympic Games. From 1900 to 1976 Kuwait did not qualify for the Olympic Games but in 1980 Kuwait qualified for the Olympic Games in China and had the best record of their country finishing in the quarter-finals of that Olympic games. Kuwait missed the 1984 and 1988 Olympic Games. But in 1992 Kuwait finally qualified for the 1992 Olympic Games in Spain, however with their poor performance, Kuwait was eliminated in the first round of that tournament. After that Kuwait had missed the 1996 Olympic Games that was hosted by the United States, Kuwait then qualified for the 2000 Olympic Games in Australia and that was the last time Kuwait qualified for the Olympic Games. Kuwait has never won the GCC U-23 Championship but their best finish at that Competition was as a runner up in 2010. In the 2022 Asian U-23 qualification Cup Group D, Kuwait managed to defeat Bangladesh by 1-0 and Saudi Arabia by 2–1, this resulted in Kuwait to qualify for the 2022 U-23 Asian Cup.

== Honours ==
=== Regional honours ===
- GCC U-23 Championship

Runners-up (2): 2010, 2015

=== Minor ===
- 2018 Olympic Return Cup

== History ==
Kuwait's first-ever qualification to the Olympic games was in the 1980 Olympic Games which Kuwait were eliminated in the quarter-finals of that Olympic games. Kuwait missed the 1984 Olympic Games and the 1988 Olympic Games. Kuwait came back to the Olympic Games in 1992 after missing two events being eliminated in the quarter-final of that event. Kuwait did not qualify until the 2000 Olympic Games and that was the last time Kuwait qualified for the Olympic games. Kuwait did not qualify to the Olympic Games in 2004 after being eliminated in the qualifying Preliminary round 3 of the Football at the 2004 Summer Olympics – Qualifiers at the third position of the 3rd group. Kuwait was unqualified from Football at the 2008 Summer Olympics – Qualifier, with 2 being 4 goals less than Qatar due to that, Kuwait missed the 2008 Olympic Games. Kuwait also failed to participate in the 2012 Olympic Games after losing Football at the 2012 Summer Olympics – Qualifiers, within losing the first leg to Japan 3-1 but then Kuwait defeated Japan 2–1, Japan won on the aggregate. Kuwait does not have a good record at GCC U-23 Championship after finishing 5th in the final group of the 2008 GCC U-23 Championship. Kuwait was at the bottom of the table at that time. In 2010 Kuwait was the runner-up of their group. Kuwait was qualified for the semi-finals, Kuwait defeated Oman 5–4 on penalties. But lost to UAE. In the 2011 and 2012 GCC U-23 Championship, Kuwait was unfortunately eliminated in the first round with 0 points losing all three games.

== Participation in Tournaments ==
=== Summer Olympics ===
Summer Olympics record
| Year | Result | Position | GP | W | D | L | GF | GA | Squad |
|---|---|---|---|---|---|---|---|---|---|
| 1900–1988 | See Kuwait national football team | | | | | | | | |
| (Spain) 1992 | Group stage | 16th | 3 | 0 | 0 | 3 | 1 | 6 | Squad |
| (United States) 1996 | did not qualify | | | | | | | | |
| (Australia) 2000 | Group stage | 12th | 3 | 1 | 0 | 2 | 6 | 8 | Squad |
| (Greece) 2004 | did not qualify | | | | | | | | |
| (China) 2008 | did not qualify | | | | | | | | |
| (United Kingdom) 2012 | did not qualify | | | | | | | | |
| (Brazil) 2016 | did not qualify | | | | | | | | |
| (Japan) 2020 | did not qualify | | | | | | | | |
| (France) 2024 | did not qualify | | | | | | | | |
| (United States) 2028 | to be determined | | | | | | | | |
| (Australia) 2032 | to be determined | | | | | | | | |
| Total | Group stage | 2/11 | 6 | 1 | 0 | 5 | 7 | 14 | — |

=== Asian Games ===
From 2002 Asian Games, at the first tournament to be played in an under-23 format.

| Year | Round | GP | W | D* | L | GS | GA |
|---|---|---|---|---|---|---|---|
| (South Korea) 2002 | - | 4 | 3 | 0 | 1 | 9 | 1 |
| (Qatar) 2006 | - | 3 | 2 | 0 | 1 | 5 | 1 |
| (China) 2010 | - | 4 | 2 | 0 | 2 | 4 | 4 |
| (South Korea) 2014 | - | 3 | 1 | 0 | 2 | 6 | 7 |
| Total | 4/4 | 14 | 8 | 0 | 6 | 19 | 13 |

=== AFC U-23 Asian Cup ===
| Year | Round | GP | W | D* | L | GS | GA |
|---|---|---|---|---|---|---|---|
| (Oman) 2013 | Group stage | 3 | 0 | 1 | 2 | 1 | 4 |
| (Qatar) 2016 | Did not qualify | | | | | | |
| (China) 2018 | Did not qualify | | | | | | |
| (Thailand) 2020 | Did not qualify | | | | | | |
| (Uzbekistan) 2022 | Group stage | 3 | 0 | 0 | 3 | 1 | 6 |
| (Qatar) 2024 | Group stage | 3 | 1 | 0 | 2 | 3 | 9 |
| (Saudi Arabia) 2026 | Did not qualify | | | | | | |
| (Japan) 2028 | To be determined | | | | | | |
| Total | 3/8 | 9 | 1 | 1 | 7 | 5 | 19 |

== Kuwait's fixtures and results ==
=== 2026 ===
| 15 September 2026 Asian Games GS | Vietnam | 1–1 | Kuwait | Nagoya, Japan |
| 19:00 UTC+9 | Nguyễn Ngọc Mỹ 80' | Report | Al-Matar 78' | Stadium: CS Asset Minato Soccer Stadium; Attendance: 1,058; Referee: Kim Woo-sung (South Korea) |

| 18 September 2026 Asian Games GS | Kuwait | 0–2 | Uzbekistan | Nagoya, Japan |
| 19:00 UTC+9 | | Report | Bakhromov 6', 36' | Stadium: CS Asset Minato Soccer Stadium; Attendance: 638; Referee: Sami Al-Ismail (Saudi Arabia) |

| September 22 2026 Asian Games | Philippines | 2–1 | Kuwait | Nagoya, Japan |
| 14:00 UTC+9 | Rublico 19'; Aldeguer 90+1' (pen.) | Report | Woods 66' (o.g.) | Stadium: CS Asset Minato Soccer Stadium; Attendance: 682; Referee: Songkran Bunmeekiart (Thailand) |

== Players ==
=== Current squad ===
- The following 25 players were called up for the 2024 AFC U-23 Asian Cup.

| No. | Pos. | Player | Date of birth (age) | Club |
|---|---|---|---|---|
| | GK | Abdulrahman Al-Harbi | 3 October 2003 (age 23) | (Kuwait Football Association) Al-Tadamon |
| | GK | Abdulrahman Al-Fadhli | 23 March 2001 (age 25) | (Kuwait Football Association) Al-Salmiya |
| | GK | Abdulrahman Kameel | 8 March 2001 (age 25) | (Kuwait Football Association) Al-Kuwait |
| | DF | Abdulrahman Al-Daihani | 21 January 2001 (age 25) | (Kuwait Football Association) Al-Qadsia |
| | DF | Khaled Al-Fadhli | 23 February 2002 (age 24) | (Kuwait Football Association) Al-Qadsia |
| | DF | Saleh Faisal | 18 September 2003 (age 23) | (Kuwait Football Association) Kazma |
| | DF | Sultan Al-Faraj | 16 June 2001 (age 25) | (Kuwait Football Association) Al-Kuwait |
| | DF | Mohsen Ghareeb | 11 November 2004 (age 22) | (Kuwait Football Association) Al-Kuwait |
| | DF | Youssef Al-Haqqan | 5 February 2002 (age 24) | (Kuwait Football Association) Al-Qadsia |
| | DF | Abdulrahman Karam | 15 March 2001 (age 25) | (Kuwait Football Association) Al-Arabi |
| | DF | Faisal Al-Shatti | 19 May 2002 (age 24) | (Kuwait Football Association) Al-Qadsia |
| | MF | Hussain Ashkanani | 26 January 2002 (age 24) | (Kuwait Football Association) Al-Arabi |
| | MF | Abdullah Al-Awadi | 17 September 2001 (age 25) | (Kuwait Football Association) Al-Qadsia |
| | MF | Mahdi Dashti | 26 October 2001 (age 25) | (Kuwait Football Association) Al-Salmiya |
| | MF | Fahad Al-Fadhli | 4 February 2001 (age 25) | (Kuwait Football Association) Kazma |
| | MF | Bader Al-Mutairi | 26 September 2003 (age 23) | (Kuwait Football Association) Al-Arabi |
| | MF | Montaser Suleiman | 17 May 2005 (age 21) | (Kuwait Football Association) Kazma |
| | FW | Abdulaziz Asaad | 28 January 2002 (age 24) | (Kuwait Football Association) Al-Jahra |
| | FW | Salman Al-Awadi | 21 May 2001 (age 25) | (Kuwait Football Association) Al-Arabi |
| | FW | Muath Al-Enezi | 26 October 2001 (age 25) | (Kuwait Football Association) Al-Salmiya |
| | FW | Jarah Al-Hilali | 29 February 2004 (age 22) | (Kuwait Football Association) Kazma |
| | FW | Ibrahim Kameel | 10 June 2002 (age 24) | (Kuwait Football Association) Al-Kuwait |
| | FW | Talal Al-Qaissi | 21 June 2002 (age 24) | (Kuwait Football Association) Kazma |
| | FW | Abdulrahman Al-Rashidi | 12 January 2004 (age 22) | (Kuwait Football Association) Al-Nasr |
| | FW | Hamad Al-Taweel | 26 July 2001 (age 25) | (Kuwait Football Association) Khaitan |

== Coaching staff ==
| Name | Role |
|---|---|
| Head coach | (Portugal) Emílio Peixe |
| Assistant coach | (Portugal) Francisco Gouvela (Portugal) Paulo Vieira (Portugal) Vasco Pereira |
| Goalkeeper coach | (Portugal) Tiago Manta |
| Fitness coach | (Portugal) Jose Vasconcelos |
| Match analyst | (Kuwait) Hamed Al-Mutairi |
| Team doctor | (Portugal) Joao Pedro Pinho |
| Physiotherapist | (Portugal) Ricardo Couto |
| Masseur | (Kuwait) Alfan Al Beshar |
| Team manager | (Kuwait) Ahmed Saad |
| Technical director | (Portugal) Diogo Rebelo |

== See also ==
- Kuwait national football team
- Kuwait national under-20 football team
- Kuwait national under-17 football team
- Kuwait women's national football team
