= Nasser Al-Shimli =

Omani footballer (born 1989)

Personal information
- Full name: Nasser Ali Al-Shimli
- Date of birth: 15 February 1989 (age 37)
- Place of birth: Al-Ain, United Arab Emirates
- Height: 1.78 m (5 ft 10 in)
- Position: Centre-back

Team information
- Current team: Al-Oruba
- Number: 5

Youth career
- 2006–2008: Al-Nahda

Senior career*
Years	Team	Apps	(Gls)
2008–2012	Al-Nahda	34	(2)
2012–2013	Dhofar	17	(1)
2013–2014	Al-Nahda	22	(0)
2014–	Al-Oruba	10	(1)

International career
2011	Oman U-23	2	(0)
2010–	Oman	9	(0)
- * Club domestic league appearances and goals

Nasser Ali Al-Shimli (Arabic: ناصر علي الشملي; born 15 February 1989) is an Omani footballer who plays for Al-Oruba SC.

== Club career ==
On 4 September 2014, he signed a one-year contract with Al-Oruba SC.

=== Club career statistics ===
Club	Season	Division	League		Cup		Continental (Note: Includes appearances in the AFC Champions League and AFC Cup)		Other (Note: Includes goal in the GCC Champions League)		Total	
Club	Season	Division	Apps	Goals	Apps	Goals	Apps	Goals	Apps	Goals	Apps	Goals
Al-Nahda	2009–10	Oman Professional League	-	1	-	0	4	0	-	0	-	1
Al-Nahda	2011–12	Oman Professional League	-	1	-	0	0	0	-	0	-	1
Al-Nahda	2013–14	Oman Professional League	-	1	-	0	0	0	-	1	-	2
Al-Nahda	Total		-	3	-	0	4	0	-	1	-	4
Dhofar	2012–13	Oman Elite League	-	1	-	0	3	1	-	1	-	3
Dhofar	Total		-	1	-	0	3	1	-	1	-	3
Career total			-	4	-	0	7	1	-	2	-	7

== International career ==
Nasser is part of the first team squad of the Oman national football team. He was selected for the national team for the first time in 2010. He made his first appearance for Oman on 17 November 2010 in a friendly match against Belarus. He has represented the national team in the 20th Arabian Gulf Cup, the 2014 FIFA World Cup qualification and the 2015 AFC Asian Cup qualification.

== Honours ==
=== Club ===
- With Al-Nahda
  - Oman Professional League (1): 2013–14
  - Sultan Qaboos Cup Runner-up: 2012, 2013
  - Oman Super Cup (2): 2009, 2014
