= Mansoor Al-Nuaimi =

Omani footballer (born 1989)

Personal information
- Full name: Mansoor Ghamil Al-Nuaimi
- Date of birth: 13 February 1989 (age 37)
- Place of birth: Al-Buraimi, Oman
- Height: 1.79 m (5 ft 10 in)
- Position: Forward

Team information
- Current team: Al-Nahda
- Number: 7

Youth career
- 2003–2008: Al-Nahda

Senior career*
Years	Team	Apps	(Gls)
2008–	Al-Nahda		(10)

International career
2011	Oman U-23	2	(0)
2009–	Oman	4	(0)
- * Club domestic league appearances and goals

Mansoor Ghamil Al-Nuaimi (Arabic: منصور غامل النعيمي; born 13 February 1989), commonly known as Mansoor Al-Nuaimi, is an Omani footballer who plays for Al-Nahda Club.

== Club career statistics ==
Club	Season	Division	League		Cup		Continental (Note: Includes appearances in the AFC Cup)		Other		Total	
Club	Season	Division	Apps	Goals	Apps	Goals	Apps	Goals	Apps	Goals	Apps	Goals
Al-Nahda	2008–09	Oman Professional League	-	1	-	4	0	0	-	0	-	5
Al-Nahda	2009–10	Oman Professional League	-	1	-	1	4	0	-	0	-	2
Al-Nahda	2010–11	Oman Professional League	-	1	-	0	0	0	-	0	-	1
Al-Nahda	2011–12	Oman Professional League	-	1	-	0	0	0	-	0	-	1
Al-Nahda	2012–13	Oman Professional League	-	5	-	0	0	0	-	0	-	5
Al-Nahda	2013–14	Oman Professional League	-	1	-	1	0	0	-	0	-	2
Al-Nahda	Total		-	10	-	6	4	0	-	0	-	16
Career total			-	10	-	6	4	0	-	0	-	16

== International career ==
Mansoor is part of the first team squad of the Oman national football team. He was selected for the national team for the first time in 2009. He made his first appearance for Oman on 17 November 2009 in a friendly match against Brazil. He has made an appearance in the 2011 AFC Asian Cup qualification.

== Honours ==
=== Club ===
- Oman Professional League (1): 2013-14
- Sultan Qaboos Cup (0): Runner-up 2012, 2013
- Oman Super Cup (2): 2009, 2014
