= Qasim Said =

Omani footballer (born 1989)

Personal information
- Full name: Qasim Said Sanjoor Hardan
- Date of birth: 20 April 1989 (age 37)
- Place of birth: Salalah, Oman
- Height: 1.78 m (5 ft 10 in)
- Position: Left winger

Team information
- Current team: Al-Nasr
- Number: 10

Senior career*
Years	Team	Apps	(Gls)
2007–	Al-Nasr	214	(29)

International career
2011	Oman U-23	2	(0)
2009–	Oman	82	(13)
- * Club domestic league appearances and goals

Qasim Said Sanjoor Hardan (Arabic: قاسم بن سعيد سنجور الحردان; born 20 April 1989), commonly known as Qasim Said, is an Omani footballer who plays for Al-Nasr.

== Club career ==
On 4 June 2014, Said agreed a one-year contract extension with Al-Nasr S.C.S.C.

== International career ==
Said is part of the first team squad of the Oman national football team. He was selected for the national team for the first time in 2009. He has made appearances in the 20th Arabian Gulf Cup, the 2011 AFC Asian Cup qualification, the 2012 WAFF Championship, the 2014 FIFA World Cup qualification and the 2015 AFC Asian Cup qualification.

== Career statistics ==
=== Club ===
Club	Season	Division	League		Cup		Continental		Other		Total	
Club	Season	Division	Apps	Goals	Apps	Goals	Apps	Goals	Apps	Goals	Apps	Goals
Al-Nasr	2007–08	Oman Professional League	-	1	-	0	0	0	-	0	-	3
Al-Nasr	2008–09	Oman Professional League	-	7	-	0	0	0	-	0	-	3
Al-Nasr	2009–10	Oman Professional League	-	4	-	1	0	0	-	0	-	3
Al-Nasr	2010–11	Oman Professional League	-	1	-	0	0	0	-	0	-	3
Al-Nasr	2012–13	Oman Professional League	-	10	-	1	0	0	-	0	-	3
Al-Nasr	2013–14	Oman Professional League	-	6	-	0	0	0	-	0	-	3
Al-Nasr	Total		-	29	-	2	0	0	-	0	-	31
Career total			-	29	-	2	0	0	-	0	-	31

=== International ===
Scores and results list Oman's goal tally first.

#	Date	Venue	Opponent	Score	Result	Competition
1	15 July 2011	Al-Seeb Stadium, Seeb, Oman	Syria	1–0	1–1	Friendly
2	28 September 2012	Sultan Qaboos Sports Complex, Muscat, Oman	Yemen	1–0	2–1	Friendly
3	11 December 2012	Al-Sadaqua Walsalam Stadium, Adiliya, Kuwait	Kuwait	1–0	2–0	2012 WAFF Championship
4	11 December 2012	Al-Sadaqua Walsalam Stadium, Adiliya, Kuwait	Kuwait	2–0	2–0	2012 WAFF Championship
5	14 December 2012	Ali Sabah Al-Salem Stadium, Al Farwaniyah, Kuwait	Palestine	2–0	2–1	2012 WAFF Championship
6	20 December 2012	Ali Sabah Al-Salem Stadium, Al Farwaniyah, Kuwait	Bahrain	1–0	1–0	2012 WAFF Championship
7	14 August 2013	Jalan Besar Stadium, Kallang, Singapore	Singapore	1–0	2–0	2015 AFC Asian Cup qualification
8	5 March 2014	Sultan Qaboos Sports Complex, Muscat, Oman	Singapore	2–0	3–1	2015 AFC Asian Cup qualification
9	26 March 2015	Al-Seeb Stadium, Seeb, Oman	Malaysia	3–0	6–0	Friendly
10	11 June 2015	Sree Kanteerava Stadium, Bengaluru, India	India	1–0	2–1	2018 FIFA World Cup qualification
11	2 October 2015	Sultan Qaboos Sports Complex, Muscat, Oman	Syria	1–0	2–1	Friendly
12	6 October 2016	Sultan Qaboos Sports Complex, Muscat, Oman	Jordan	1–0	1–1	Friendly
13	14 November 2016	Thuwunna Stadium, Yangon, Myanmar	Myanmar	2–0	3–0	Friendly
