= Aspire Dome =

Indoor multi-purpose arena in Al Rayyan, Qatar

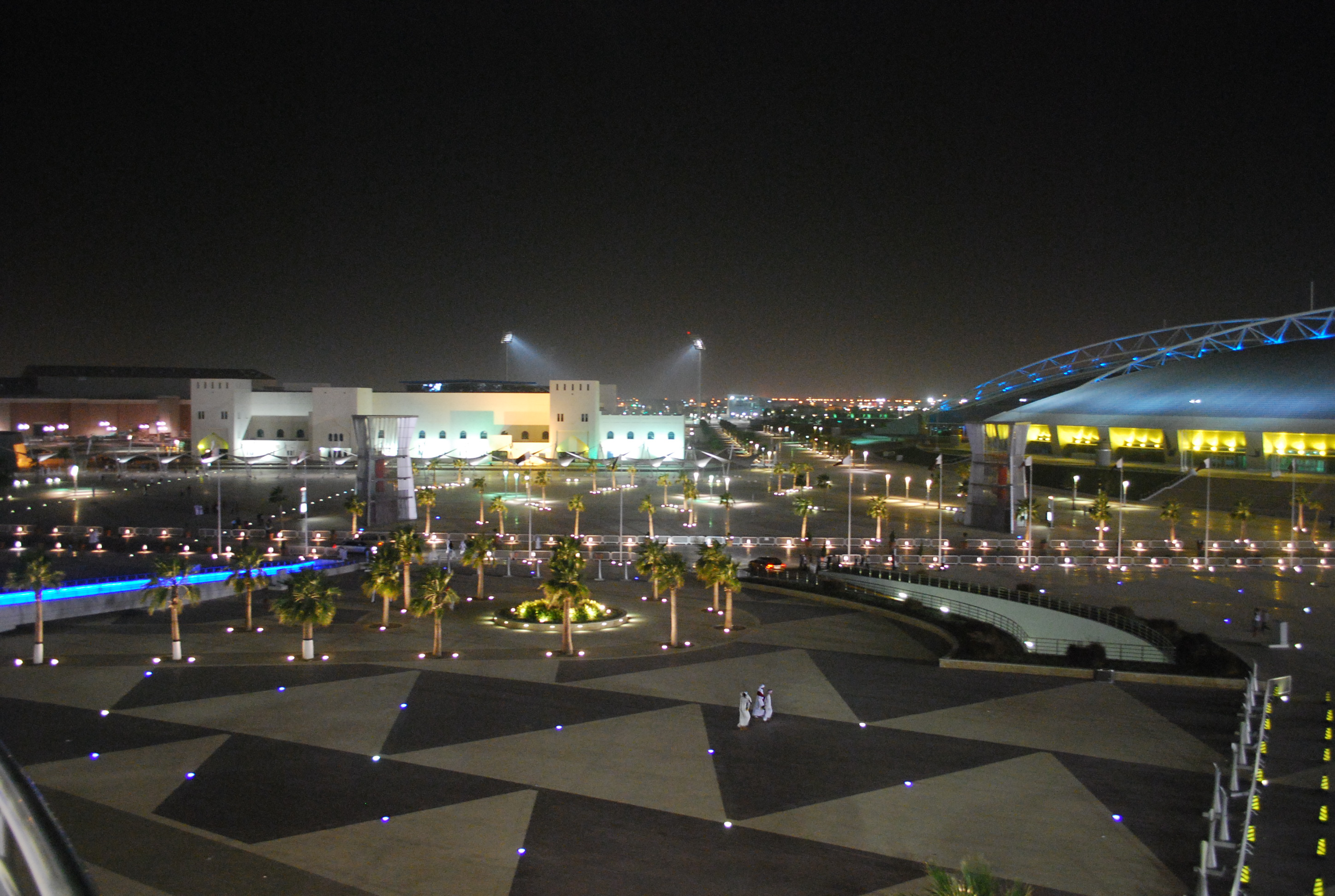
- Interactive map of Aspire Dome
- Full name: Aspire Dome
- Location: Aspire Academy, Al Rayyan, Qatar
- Coordinates: 25°16′0″N 51°26′37″E
- Capacity: 15,500 (total)

Construction
- Opened: 2005
- Architect: Roger Taillibert

Tenants
- Aspire Academy; 2006 Asian Games; 2010 IAAF World Indoor Championships; 2011 Gymnasiade; 2024 World Aquatics Championships

The Aspire Dome is an indoor multi-purpose arena based in Al Rayyan, Qatar. It is located in the Aspire Academy in Al Rayyan and has the capacity to host 13 different sporting events simultaneously in a climate controlled arena, in addition to a full-sized indoor football pitch.

== Events hosted ==
Aspire Dome was one of the venues of the 2006 Asian Games and the 2010 IAAF World Indoor Championships. In 2018, Aspire Dome was also the host of the 2018 World Artistic Gymnastics Championships. In 2027, Aspire Dome will host matches for the FIBA Basketball World Cup.

== Facilities ==
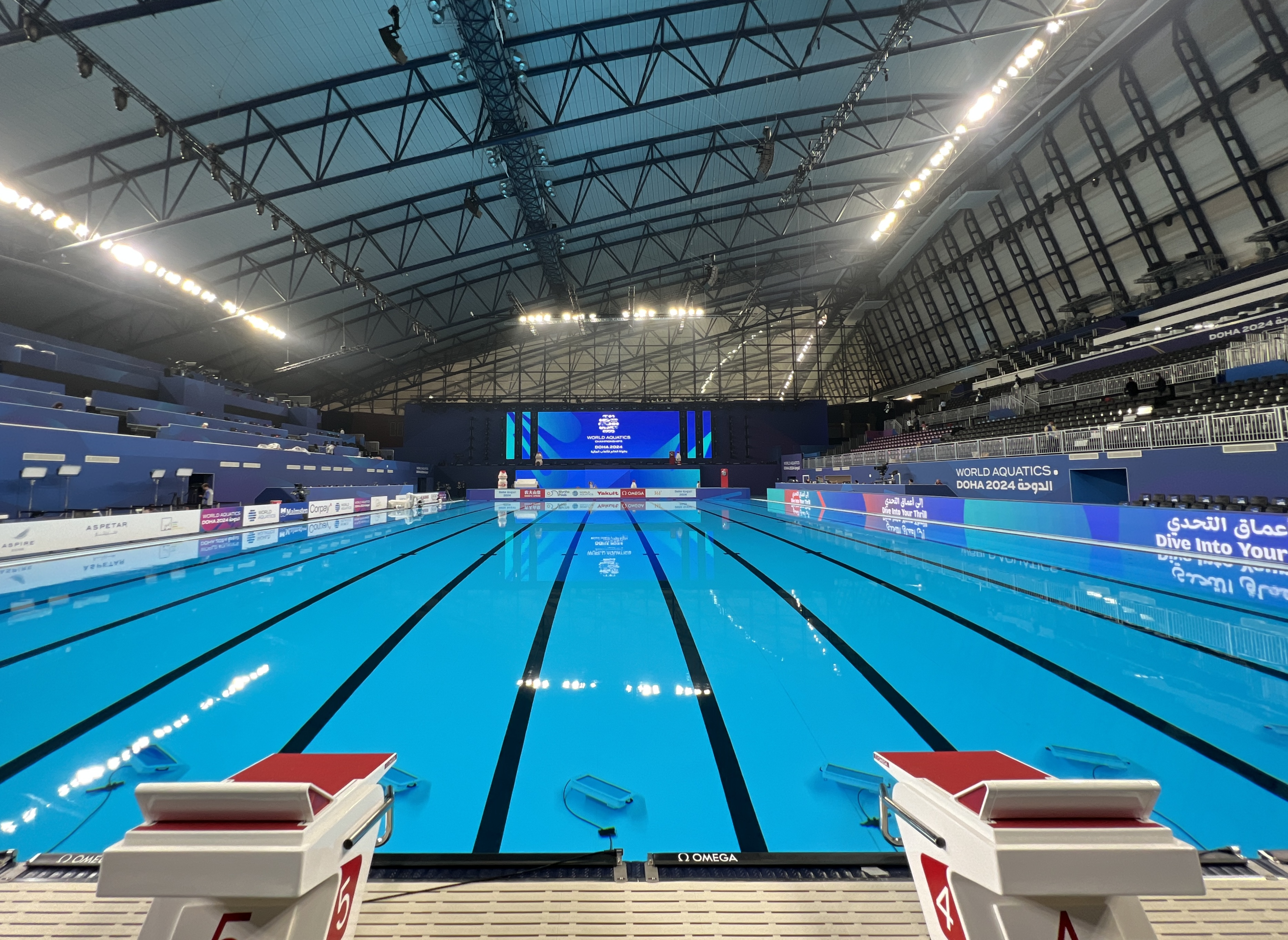
Inside the Aspire Dome during the 2024 World Aquatics Championships.

The range of facilities available within the Aspire Dome include:

- World Athletics-accredited Indoor Track with 200 Meters Running Track / Pole Vault / Long Jump / High Jump / Shot-put cage including 3,650 spectator seats, 240 VIP Seats and VIP room
- FIFA-approved Indoor Football Pitch with 5,800 spectator seats, 230 VIP seats and 2 VIP rooms
- Olympic 50-metre Swimming Pool and Olympic Diving Pool with 252 spectator seats
- Volleyball Hall with 1,200 spectator seats
- Table Tennis Hall set-up for 9 tables with 150 spectator seats
- Two Multi-Sports Halls for Basketball / Volleyball / Handball / Futsal with 1,200 and 410 spectator seats respectively
- Fencing / Gymnastics Hall with 6 fencing strips and Mini Gymnastics area
- Squash Courts including 7 ASB squash courts, 1 Central Glass court and warm-up area
- Gymnasiums including the Power Gym, Strength & Conditioning Gym, Cardio Gym, Staff Gym & Spa
- Sports Science Labs including Biochemistry Lab, Altitude Lab, Physiology Lab, Biomechanics Lab and Anthropometry Lab
- Sports Psychology Labs including four Champions Psychology Labs
- Offices including meeting rooms, conference rooms and VIP corporate suites

== See also ==
- Aspire Academy
- Aspire Zone

| Preceded by Luis Puig Palace; Valencia | IAAF World Indoor Championships in Athletics; Venue; 2010 | Succeeded by Ataköy Athletics Arena; Istanbul |
| Preceded by Sajik Baseball Stadium; Busan | Asian Games; Venue; 2006 | Succeeded by Guangzhou Gymnasium; Guangzhou |
