= GFF U-23 Gulf Cup =

- Founded: 2008
- Teams: 8
- Current champions: Saudi Arabia (5th title)
- Most championships: Saudi Arabia (5 titles)
- Website: the-gff.com
- 2025 AGCFF U-23 Gulf Cup

The GFF U-23 Gulf Cup (Arabic: كأس الخليج تحت 23 عامًا), formerly known as the GCC U-23 Championship, is a regional football competition governed by the Gulf Football Federation (GFF). The tournament was founded by the Gulf Cooperation Council (GCC) and was first organised in 2008 as a round-robin tournament of five nations. The last edition organised by the GCC was in 2016.

The tournament was relaunched by the AGCFF (now known as the GFF) in 2025, featuring eight teams.

== Records ==
Season	Host	Winner	Score	Runner-up
GCC U-23 Championship
2008	Saudi Arabia	Saudi Arabia	^{n/a}	Bahrain
2010	Qatar	United Arab Emirates	1–0	Kuwait
2011	Qatar	Oman	0–0 (4–2 p)	United Arab Emirates
2012	Qatar	Saudi Arabia	2–0	Bahrain
2013	Bahrain	Bahrain	1–0	Saudi Arabia
2015	Bahrain	Saudi Arabia	5–2	Kuwait
2016	Qatar	Saudi Arabia	^{n/a}	Oman
AGCFF U-23 Gulf Cup
2025	Qatar	Saudi Arabia	2–0	Iraq

^n/a A round-robin tournament determined the final standings.

== Performances ==
Team	(Saudi Arabia) 2008	(Qatar) 2010	(Qatar) 2011	(Qatar) 2012	(Bahrain) 2013	(Bahrain) 2015	(Qatar) 2016	(Qatar) 2025	Years
Bahrain	2nd	GS	GS	2nd	1st	5th	5th	GS	8
Iraq	—							2nd	1
Kuwait	GS	2nd	GS	GS	3rd	2nd	—N/a	GS	7
Oman	GS	3rd	1st	GS	4th	3rd	2nd	GS	8
Qatar	3rd	4th	4th	4th	GS	6th	4th	SF	8
Saudi Arabia	1st	GS	3rd	1st	2nd	1st	1st	1st	8
United Arab Emirates	—N/a	1st	2nd	3rd	GS	4th	3rd	SF	7
Yemen	—							GS	1
Total	5	6	6	6	6	6	5	8	

- Red border: Host nation.
- Blank: Did not enter.
- GS: Group Stage.
- SF: Semi-final.

== See also ==
- Asian Football Confederation
- Arabian Gulf Cup
