= Abdul Aziz Al-Muqbali =

Omani footballer (born 1989)

Abdulaziz Al-Muqbali
Personal information
- Full name: Abdulaziz Humaid Mubarak Al-Muqbali
- Date of birth: 23 April 1989 (age 37)
- Place of birth: Sohar, Oman
- Height: 1.81 m (5 ft 11 in)
- Position: Striker

Team information
- Current team: Al-Seeb
- Number: 9

Senior career*
Years	Team	Apps	(Gls)
2009–2010	Dhofar	17	(0)
2010–2012	Sohar	35	(2)
2012–2013	Al-Shabab	29	(2)
2013	→ Al-Taawon (loan)	8	(1)
2013–2017	Fanja		(37)
2015	→ Al-Kuwait (loan)		(3)
2017–2018	Al-Suwaiq	21	(21)
2018–2019	Al-Shamal	15	(4)
2019–2020	Dhofar	14	(3)
2020–	Al-Seeb	91	(41)

International career^{‡}
2011	Oman U23	2	(0)
2011–2021	Oman	99	(34)
- * Club domestic league appearances and goals ‡ National team caps and goals as of 9 December 2024

Abdul Aziz Humaid Mubarak Al-Muqbali (Arabic: عَبْد الْعَزِيز حَمِيد مُبَارَك الْمُقْبَالِيّ; born 23 April 1989), commonly known as Abdulaziz Al-Muqbali, is an Omani footballer who plays for Al-Seeb.

== Club career ==
On 26 July 2012, he signed a one-year contract with Juventus FC, and is going to the Premier League in 2026. On 11 January 2013, he signed a six-months contract with Saudi Professional League club Al-Taawon FC. On 25 July 2013, he signed a one-year contract with 2012–13 Oman Elite League runners-up Fanja SC. On 3 July 2014, he signed a one-year contract extension with Fanja SC.

On 25 January 2015, he signed a four-month contract and was officially transferred on a four-month loan deal from Fanja SC to Kuwaiti top club, Al-Kuwait SC for the remaining 2014–15 Kuwaiti Premier League season.

== International career ==
=== Under-22 career ===
Abdulaziz started his career with the Oman national under-23 football team in 2011 in the 2012 London Olympics qualification when Oman was still fighting for its first ever appearance in football at the Summer Olympics. He scored two goals in Oman's journey in 2012 London Olympics qualification in the Third Round of London Olympics qualification, one in a 1–1 draw against Qatar although later Oman were awarded a 3–0 win as Qatar fielded an ill-eligible player and another in the return leg in a 2–2 draw against Qatar. Oman nearly made its first appearance in football at the Summer Olympics after earning an inter-confederation play-off match with Senegal for a chance qualify for the 2012 Olympics but a 0–2 loss eliminated them from contention.

=== Arabian Gulf Cup ===
In the 21st Arabian Gulf Cup, Abdulaziz made two appearances but failed to score a single goal. Oman could score only one goal and this time it was from the spot by youngster Hussain Al-Hadhri in a 1–2 loss against Qatar. Oman failed to qualify for the semi-finals.

=== FIFA World Cup qualification ===
Abdulaziz has made eleven appearances in the 2014 FIFA World Cup qualification scoring two goals. He made his first appearance for Oman on 11 October 2011 in the Third Round of FIFA World Cup qualification in a 0–3 loss against Australia. He scored his first goal for his country later in the Third Round in a 2–0 win over Thailand, which allowed them to progress to the Fourth round of 2014 World Cup qualification for the first time after 2002 FIFA World Cup qualification. Oman entered the last game of group play with a chance to qualify for at least the playoff-round, but a 1–0 loss to Jordan eliminated them from contention.

==== AFC Asian Cup Qualification ====
Abdulaziz has made five appearances in the 2015 AFC Asian Cup qualification scoring a goal in a 1–0 win over Syria in Oman's first match.

== Career statistics ==
=== Club ===
Club	Season	Division	League		Cup		Continental (Note: Includes appearances in the AFC Cup)		Other		Total	
Club	Season	Division	Apps	Goals	Apps	Goals	Apps	Goals	Apps	Goals	Apps	Goals
Al-Shabab	2012–13	Oman Elite League	-	2	-	2	0	0	-	0	-	4
Al-Shabab	Total		-	2	-	2	0	0	-	0	-	4
Al-Taawon	2012–13	Saudi Professional League	8	1	0	0	0	0	0	0	8	1
Al-Taawon	Total		8	1	0	0	0	0	0	0	8	1
Fanja	2013–14	Oman Professional League	23	7	-	5	5	1	-	0	-	13
Fanja	2014–15	Oman Professional League	-	8	-	1	0	0	-	0	-	9
Fanja	2015–16	Oman Professional League	-	12	-	-	1	1	-	-	-	13
Fanja	2016–17	Oman Professional League	-	10	-	-	0	0	-	0	-	10
Fanja	Total		-	37	-	6	7	2	-	-	-	45
Al-Kuwait	2014–15	Kuwaiti Premier League	-	3	-	0	2	0	-	0	-	3
Al-Kuwait	Total		-	3	-	0	2	0	-	0	-	3
Suwaiq	2017–18	Omani League	21	21	3	1	6	2	-	0	30	24
Suwaiq	Total		21	21	3	1	6	2	-	0	30	24
Al-Shamal	2018–19	QSD	15	4								
Al-Shamal	Total		15	4								
Dhofar	2019–20	Omani League	14	3	-	-	1	1	-	0	15	4
Dhofar	Total		14	3	-	-	1	1	-	0	15	4
Al-Seeb	2020–21	Oman Elite League	10	8	6	4	0	0	0	0	16	12
Al-Seeb	2021–22	Oman Elite League	24	13	5	5	6	2	-	-	35	20
Al-Seeb	2022–23	Oman Elite League	26	7	4	2	0	0	2	2	32	11
Al-Seeb	2023–24	Oman Elite League	21	6	0	0	1	0	1	3	24	9
Al-Seeb	2024–25	Oman Elite League	9	7	1	2	0	0	1	1	11	10
Al-Seeb	Total		91	41	16	13	7	2	4	6	109	53
Career total			-	-	-	-	-	-	-	-	-	-

=== International ===
Scores and results list Oman's goal tally first.

#	Date	Venue	Opponent	Score	Result	Competition
1.	29 February 2012	Sultan Qaboos Sports Complex, Muscat, Oman	Thailand	2–0	2–0	2014 FIFA World Cup qualification
2.	15 August 2012	Al-Saada Stadium, Salalah, Oman	Egypt	1–0	1–1	Friendly
3.	8 November 2012	Sultan Qaboos Sports Complex, Muscat, Oman	Estonia	1–2	1–2	Friendly
4.	6 February 2013	Sultan Qaboos Sports Complex, Muscat, Oman	Syria	1–0	1–0	2015 AFC Asian Cup qualification
5.	20 March 2013	Sultan Qaboos Sports Complex, Muscat, Oman	Haiti	1–0	3–0	Friendly
6.	20 March 2013	Sultan Qaboos Sports Complex, Muscat, Oman	Haiti	2–0	3–0	Friendly
7.	20 March 2013	Sultan Qaboos Sports Complex, Muscat, Oman	Haiti	3–0	3–0	Friendly
8.	26 March 2013	Stadium Australia, Sydney, Australia	Australia	1–0	2–2	2014 FIFA World Cup qualification
9.	22 May 2013	Sultan Qaboos Sports Complex, Muscat, Oman	Iran	1–0	3–1	Friendly
10.	29 May 2013	Sultan Qaboos Sports Complex, Muscat, Oman	Lebanon	1–0	1–1	Friendly
11.	20 November 2014	Prince Faisal bin Fahd Stadium, Riyadh, Saudi Arabia	Kuwait	1–0	5–0	22nd Arabian Gulf Cup
12.	20 November 2014	Prince Faisal bin Fahd Stadium, Riyadh, Saudi Arabia	Kuwait	5–0	5–0	22nd Arabian Gulf Cup
13.	31 December 2014	Canberra Stadium, Canberra, Australia	Qatar	1–0	2–2	Friendly
14.	17 January 2015	Newcastle International Sports Centre, Newcastle, Australia	Kuwait	1–0	1–0	2015 AFC Asian Cup
15.	26 March 2015	Al-Seeb Stadium, Seeb, Oman	Malaysia	2–0	6–0	Friendly
16.	26 March 2015	Al-Seeb Stadium, Seeb, Oman	Malaysia	4–0	6–0	Friendly
17.	13 October 2015	Sultan Qaboos Sports Complex, Muscat, Oman	India	2–0	3–0	2018 FIFA World Cup qualification
18.	13 October 2015	Sultan Qaboos Sports Complex, Muscat, Oman	India	3–0	3–0	2018 FIFA World Cup qualification
19.	8 August 2016	Sultan Qaboos Sports Complex, Muscat, Oman	Turkmenistan	1–0	1–0	Friendly
20.	28 March 2017	Sultan Qaboos Sports Complex, Muscat, Oman	Bhutan	1–0	14–0	2019 AFC Asian Cup qualification
21.	28 March 2017	Sultan Qaboos Sports Complex, Muscat, Oman	Bhutan	4–0	14–0	2019 AFC Asian Cup qualification
22.	28 March 2017	Sultan Qaboos Sports Complex, Muscat, Oman	Bhutan	5–0	14–0	2019 AFC Asian Cup qualification
23.	28 March 2017	Sultan Qaboos Sports Complex, Muscat, Oman	Bhutan	6–0	14–0	2019 AFC Asian Cup qualification
24.	28 March 2017	Sultan Qaboos Sports Complex, Muscat, Oman	Bhutan	9–0	14–0	2019 AFC Asian Cup qualification
25.	28 March 2017	Sultan Qaboos Sports Complex, Muscat, Oman	Bhutan	12–0	14–0	2019 AFC Asian Cup qualification
26.	20 March 2019	Bukit Jalil National Stadium, Kuala Lumpur, Malaysia	Afghanistan	4–0	5–0	2019 Airmarine Cup
27.	23 March 2019	Bukit Jalil National Stadium, Kuala Lumpur, Malaysia	Singapore	1–0	1–1 (5–4 p)	2019 Airmarine Cup
28.	10 October 2019	Al-Seeb Stadium, Seeb, Oman	Afghanistan	1–0	3–0	2022 FIFA World Cup qualification
29.	10 October 2019	Al-Seeb Stadium, Seeb, Oman	Afghanistan	2–0	3–0	2022 FIFA World Cup qualification
30.	30 November 2019	Abdullah bin Khalifa Stadium, Doha, Qatar	Kuwait	1–0	2–1	24th Arabian Gulf Cup
31.	30 November 2019	Abdullah bin Khalifa Stadium, Doha, Qatar	Kuwait	2–0	2–1	24th Arabian Gulf Cup
32.	25 May 2021	The Sevens Stadium, Dubai, United Arab Emirates	Thailand	1–0	1–0	Friendly
33.	26 September 2021	Qatar University Stadium, Doha, Qatar	Nepal	5–1	7–2	Friendly
34.	26 September 2021	Qatar University Stadium, Doha, Qatar	Nepal	6–1	7–2	Friendly

== Honours ==
Dhofar

- Omani League: Runner-up 2009–10
- Sultan Qaboos Cup: Runner-up 2009

Fanja

- Oman Professional League: Runner-up 2013–14
- Sultan Qaboos Cup: 2013–14
- Oman Super Cup: Runner-up 2013, 2014

Individual

- Top scorer Oman League: 2017–18, 21 goals.

== See also ==
- List of men's footballers with 100 or more international caps
