= Football at the 2012 Summer Olympics – Men's Asian qualifiers preliminary round 3 =

This page provides the summaries of the matches of the group stage of the Asian football qualifiers for the 2012 Summer Olympics.

== Format ==
The 12 teams in this round were divided into three groups of four teams each and played on a home-and-away format. The group winners from each group will advance to the main tournament in London. Three second-placed teams from this round will play each other in a playoff at a centralised venue from 25 to 29 March 2012 and the winners of this group will meet the representatives of Africa for a berth in the Olympics.

== Seeding ==
The group stage draw took place on 7 July 2011 in Kuala Lumpur, Malaysia.

Pot A	Pot B	Pot C	Pot D
South Korea; Australia; Japan	Iraq; Bahrain; Qatar	Saudi Arabia; Syria; Uzbekistan	Oman; United Arab Emirates; Malaysia

== Groups ==
The matches were played between 21 September 2011 and 14 March 2012.

Legend
Team qualify for the 2012 Olympics
Team advance to the Play-off round

=== Group A ===
Team	Pld	W	D	L	GF	GA	GD	Pts
South Korea	6	3	3	0	8	2	+6	12
Oman	6	2	2	2	8	8	0	8
Qatar	6	1	4	1	6	8	−2	7
Saudi Arabia	6	0	3	3	4	8	−4	3

21 September 2011
20:00 UTC+9

South Korea	2 – 0	Oman
Yoon Bit-Garam 24'; Kim Bo-Kyung 74'	Report

Changwon Football Center, Changwon
Attendance: 13,704
Referee: Ravshan Irmatov (Uzbekistan)
21 September 2011
20:15 UTC+3

Saudi Arabia	1 – 1	Qatar
Dagriri 12'	Report	Al Nahoyi 89'

King Fahd International Stadium, Riyadh
Attendance: 1,315
Referee: Saeid Mozaffarizadeh (Iran)

23 November 2011
19:00 UTC+4

Oman	2 – 0	Saudi Arabia
Hardan 15'; Al Shamli 56'	Report

Sultan Qaboos Sports Complex, Muscat
Attendance: 5,000
Referee: Mohsen Basma (Syria)
23 November 2011
19:00 UTC+3

Qatar	1 – 1	South Korea
Majid 43' (pen.)	Report	Kim Hyun-Sung 68'

Jassim Bin Hamad Stadium, Doha
Attendance: 5,051
Referee: Nawaf Shukralla (Bahrain)

27 November 2011
14:00 UTC+9

South Korea	1 – 0	Saudi Arabia
Cho Young-Cheol 33' (pen.)	Report

Seoul World Cup Stadium, Seoul
Attendance: 27,224
Referee: Yuichi Nishimura (Japan)
27 November 2011
19:00 UTC+4

Oman	3 – 0 (awarded^{1})	Qatar
Al-Maqbali 11'	Report	Khalfan 88'

Sultan Qaboos Sports Complex, Muscat
Attendance: 10,000
Referee: Tan Hai (China PR)

5 February 2012
18:00 UTC+3

Qatar	2 – 2	Oman
Khalfan 26'; Al-Haidos 86'	Report	Al-Maqbali 34'; Farah 76'

Jassim Bin Hamad Stadium, Doha
Attendance: 2,707
Referee: Peter Green (Australia)
5 February 2012
20:35 UTC+3

Saudi Arabia	1 – 1	South Korea
Khudari 60'	Report	Kim Bo-Kyung 90+1'

Prince Mohamed bin Fahd Stadium, Dammam
Attendance: 1,315
Referee: Benjamin Williams (Australia)

22 February 2012
18:30 UTC+4

Oman	0 – 3	South Korea
	Report	Nam Tae-Hee 1'; Kim Hyun-Sung 68'; Baek Sung-Dong 72'

Sultan Qaboos Sports Complex, Muscat
Attendance: 10,000
Referee: Alireza Faghani (Iran)
22 February 2012
18:15 UTC+3

Qatar	2 – 1	Saudi Arabia
Al-Haidos 44'; Nabeel 78'	Report	Walibi 12' (pen.)

Jassim Bin Hamad Stadium, Doha
Attendance: 2,270
Referee: Minoru Tōjō (Japan)

14 March 2012
14:00 UTC+3

Saudi Arabia	1 – 1	Oman
Al-Muwallad 57'	Report	Al-Hadhri 43'

Prince Mohamed bin Fahd Stadium, Dammam
Attendance: 150
Referee: Nawaf Shukralla (Bahrain)
14 March 2012
20:00 UTC+9

South Korea	0 – 0	Qatar
	Report

Seoul World Cup Stadium, Seoul
Attendance: 23,327
Referee: Valentin Kovalenko (Uzbekistan)
- ^{1} Qatar adjudged to have played Abdelaziz Hatem when he should have served a suspension. Original result was 1–1.

=== Group B ===
Team	Pld	W	D	L	GF	GA	GD	Pts
United Arab Emirates	6	4	2	0	8	2	+6	14
Uzbekistan	6	2	2	2	7	5	+2	8
Iraq	6	1	2	3	2	7	−5	5
Australia	6	0	4	2	0	3	−3	4

21 September 2011
18:00 UTC+5

Uzbekistan	2 – 0	Iraq
Temurkhuja 71'; Turaev 78'	Report

JAR Stadium, Tashkent
Attendance: 7,223
Referee: Kim Dong-Jin (South Korea)
21 September 2011
19:30 UTC+9:30

Australia	0 – 0	United Arab Emirates
	Report

Hindmarsh Stadium, Adelaide
Attendance: 2,390
Referee: Minoru Tōjō (Japan)

22 November 2011
17:15 UTC+3

Iraq	0 – 0	Australia
	Report

Al Arabi Stadium, Doha (Qatar)
Attendance: 200
Referee: Andre El Haddad (Lebanon)
23 November 2011
18:20 UTC+4

United Arab Emirates	0 – 0	Uzbekistan
	Report

Sheikh Khalifa International Stadium, Al Ain
Attendance: 4,110
Referee: Malik Abdul Bashir (Singapore)

27 November 2011
19:15 UTC+11

Australia	0 – 0	Uzbekistan
	Report

Parramatta Stadium, Parramatta
Attendance: 2,604
Referee: Abdullah Al Hilali (Oman)
27 November 2011
18:20 UTC+4

United Arab Emirates	3 – 0 (awarded^{1})	Iraq
	Report	Abdul-Raheem 21'; Sabah 77'

Sheikh Khalifa International Stadium, Al Ain
Attendance: 6,432
Referee: Abdulrahman Hussain (Qatar)

5 February 2012
16:45 UTC+3

Iraq	0 – 1	United Arab Emirates
	Report	Ali 3'

Al Arabi Stadium, Doha (Qatar)
Attendance: 420
Referee: Nawaf Shukralla (Bahrain)
5 February 2012
15:00 UTC+5

Uzbekistan	2 – 0	Australia
Turaev 27'; Zoteev 85'	Report

JAR Stadium, Tashkent
Attendance: 4,527
Referee: Abdullah Balideh (Qatar)

21 February 2012
16:45 UTC+3

Iraq	2 – 1	Uzbekistan
M. Abdullah 45+2' (pen.); Ahmad 88'	Report	Musaev 23'

Al Arabi Stadium, Doha (Qatar)
Attendance: 100
Referee: Tan Hai (China PR)
22 February 2012
17:30 UTC+4

United Arab Emirates	1 – 0	Australia
Abdulrahman 23'	Report

Mohammed Bin Zayed Stadium, Abu Dhabi
Attendance: 28,734
Referee: Lee Min-Hu (South Korea)

14 March 2012
18:00 UTC+5

Uzbekistan	2 – 3	United Arab Emirates
Zoteev 34'; Musaev 47'	Report	Khalil 51', 55'; Saleh 90+3'

JAR Stadium, Tashkent
Attendance: 7,600
Referee: Masaaki Toma (Japan)
14 March 2012
19:30 UTC+11

Australia	0 – 0	Iraq
	Report

Central Coast Stadium, Gosford
Attendance: 2,071
Referee: Yuichi Nishimura (Japan)
- ^{1} Iraq adjudged to have played Jasim Faisal when he should have served a suspension. Original result was 2–0 to Iraq.

=== Group C ===
Team	Pld	W	D	L	GF	GA	GD	Pts
Japan	6	5	0	1	13	3	+10	15
Syria	6	4	0	2	12	6	+6	12
Bahrain	6	3	0	3	8	11	−3	9
Malaysia	6	0	0	6	3	16	−13	0

21 September 2011
20:00 UTC+9

Japan	2 – 0	Malaysia
Higashi 10'; Yamazaki 76'	Report

Tosu Stadium, Tosu
Attendance: 22,504
Referee: Abdullah Balideh (Qatar)
21 September 2011
19:00 UTC+3

Syria	3 – 1	Bahrain
Fares 15'; Mardigian 45', 54'	Report	Shubbar 85' (pen.)

Prince Mohammed Stadium, Zarqa (Jordan)
Attendance: 200
Referee: Ali Al-Badwawi (United Arab Emirates)

22 November 2011
17:30 UTC+3

Bahrain	0 – 2	Japan
	Report	Otsu 44'; Higashi 66'

National Stadium, Riffa
Attendance: 2,000
Referee: Alireza Faghani (Iran)
23 November 2011
20:45 UTC+8

Malaysia	0 – 2	Syria
	Report	Solaiman 50'; Nasouh 88'

National Stadium, Kuala Lumpur
Attendance: 30,000
Referee: Lee Min-Hu (South Korea)

27 November 2011
19:21 UTC+9

Japan	2 – 1	Syria
Hamada 45'; Otsu 86'	Report	Al Soma 75'

National Stadium, Tokyo
Attendance: 25,482
Referee: Peter Green (Australia)
27 November 2011
20:45 UTC+8

Malaysia	2 – 3	Bahrain
Nazmi 28'; Mahali 69'	Report	Al Amer 80'; Ahmed 84', 86'

National Stadium, Kuala Lumpur
Attendance: 30,000
Referee: Valentin Kovalenko (Uzbekistan)

5 February 2012
14:05 UTC+2

Syria	2 – 1	Japan
Osako 19' (o.g.); Al Salih 90'	Report	Nagai 45'

King Abdullah Stadium, Amman (Jordan)
Attendance: 500
Referee: Malik Abdul Bashir (Singapore)
5 February 2012
18:30 UTC+3

Bahrain	2 – 1	Malaysia
Al Alawi 25'; Farhan 88'	Report	Hazwan 76'

Al Ahli Stadium, Manama
Attendance: 2,000
Referee: Abdulrahman Hussain (Qatar)

22 February 2012
20:00 UTC+8

Malaysia	0 – 4	Japan
	Report	Sakai 35'; Osako 44'; Haraguchi 55'; Saito 60'

National Stadium, Kuala Lumpur
Attendance: 14,205
Referee: Mohamed Abdelkarim Al-Zarooni (United Arab Emirates)
22 February 2012
18:30 UTC+3

Bahrain	2 – 1	Syria
Al Alawi 12', 89'	Report	Al Douni 86'

National Stadium, Riffa
Attendance: 600
Referee: Abdullah Al Hilali (Oman)

14 March 2012
13:00 UTC+2

Syria	3 – 0	Malaysia
Mardigian 48', 68'; Al Soma 80'	Report

King Abdullah Stadium, Amman (Jordan)
Attendance: 600
Referee: Mohsen Torky (Iran)
14 March 2012
20:00 UTC+9

Japan	2 – 0	Bahrain
Ogihara 54'; Kiyotake 59'	Report

National Stadium, Tokyo
Attendance: 36,233
Referee: Kim Dong-Jin (South Korea)

== Goalscorers ==
4 goals

- (Syria) Mardig Mardigian

3 goals

- (Bahrain) Mohamed Tayeb Al Alawi

2 goals

- (Bahrain) Isa Ahmed
- (Japan) Keigo Higashi
- (Japan) Yuki Otsu
- (South Korea) Kim Bo-Kyung
- (South Korea) Kim Hyun-Sung
- (Oman) Abdulaziz Al-Maqbali
- (Qatar) Fahad Al-Bulushi
- (Qatar) Hassan Al Haidos
- (Syria) Omar Al Soma
- (Uzbekistan) Kenja Turaev
- (United Arab Emirates) Ahmad Khalil

1 goal

- (Bahrain) Hussain Farhan
- (Bahrain) Saad Al Amer
- (Bahrain) Sayed Shubbar
- (Iraq) Mustafa Ahmad
- (Iraq) Mohannad Abdul-Raheem
- (Iraq) Mohammed Saad Abdullah
- (Iraq) Nabeel Sabah
- (Japan) Mizuki Hamada
- (Japan) Genki Haraguchi
- (Japan) Kensuke Nagai
- (Japan) Yuya Osako
- (Japan) Manabu Saito
- (Japan) Hiroki Sakai
- (Japan) Ryohei Yamazaki
- (Japan) Takahiro Ogihara
- (Japan) Hiroshi Kiyotake
- (South Korea) Baek Sung-Dong
- (South Korea) Cho Young-Cheol
- (South Korea) Nam Tae-Hee
- (South Korea) Yoon Bit-Garam
- (Malaysia) Ahmad Hazwan Bakri
- (Malaysia) Mahali Jasuli
- (Malaysia) Nazmi Faiz
- (Oman) Nasser Al-Shamli
- (Oman) Hussain Ali Farah
- (Oman) Qasim Said Sanjoor Hardan
- (Oman) Hussain Al Hadhri
- (Qatar) Ahmed Al Nahoyi
- (Qatar) Ibrahim Majid
- (Qatar) Nasser Nabeel
- (Saudi Arabia) Yahya Dagriri
- (Saudi Arabia) Omar Khudari
- (Saudi Arabia) Ahmed Walibi
- (Syria) Ahmad Al Douni
- (Syria) Ahmad Al Salih
- (Syria) Mohamad Fares
- (Syria) Nasouh Nakdali
- (Syria) Solaiman Solaiman
- (United Arab Emirates) Omar Abdulrahman
- (United Arab Emirates) Ahmad Ali
- (Uzbekistan) Fozil Musaev
- (Uzbekistan) Temurkhuja Abdukholiqov
- (Uzbekistan) Oleg Zoteev

Own goals

- (Japan) Yuya Osako (for Syria)
