= Hussain Al-Hadhri =

Omani footballer (born 1990)

Personal information
- Full name: Hussain Ali Fareh Al-Hadhri
- Date of birth: 21 May 1990 (age 36)
- Place of birth: Salalah, Oman
- Height: 1.71 m (5 ft 7 in)
- Position: Attacking midfielder

Team information
- Current team: Dhofar
- Number: 7

Senior career*
Years	Team	Apps	(Gls)
2006–2010	Dhofar	?	(13)
2010	Ajman	?	(0)
2010–2013	Dhofar	?	(12)
2013–2014	Al-Raed	18	(3)
2014–	Dhofar		

International career
2010–2013	Oman U-23	?	(17)
2007–	Oman	39	(4)
- * Club domestic league appearances and goals

Hussain Ali Fareh Al-Hadhri (Arabic: حُسَيْن عَلِيّ فَارِح الْحَضَرَيّ), commonly known as Hussain Al-Hadhri, is an Omani footballer who plays for Dhofar Club in Oman Professional League.

== Club career ==
Al-Hadhri had played a vital role for Dhofar S.C.S.C. as a high scoring striker, rivaling Dhofari veteran, Hani Al-Dhabit. In 2009 Sultan Qaboos Cup final, Al Hadhri scored 2 goals of Dhofar against Saham SC. Saham won the match 7-6 on penalties after the match had ended 2-2 at normal time. He has scored a total of 38 goals for Dhofar in his two spells with the club.

After a one-year spell in Saudi Arabia with Al-Raed, he came back to Oman and on 30 August 2014, he signed a one-year contract with Dhofar S.C.S.C.

=== Club career statistics ===
Club	Season	Division	League		Cup		Continental (Note: Includes appearances in the AFC Cup)		Other (Note: Includes goals in the GCC Champions League and Club Friendlies)		Total	
Club	Season	Division	Apps	Goals	Apps	Goals	Apps	Goals	Apps	Goals	Apps	Goals
Dhofar	2006–07	Oman Elite League	-	4	-	1	0	0	-	0	-	5
Dhofar	2007–08	Oman Elite League	-	8	-	0	0	0	-	1	-	9
Dhofar	2008–09	Oman Elite League	-	1	-	4	0	0	-	0	-	5
Dhofar	2010–11	Oman Elite League	-	5	-	1	0	0	-	3	-	3
Dhofar	2011–12	Oman Elite League	-	3	-	1	0	0	-	0	-	4
Dhofar	2012–13	Oman Elite League	-	4	-	2	6	0	-	0	-	6
Dhofar	Total		-	25	-	9	6	0	-	4	-	38
Al-Raed	2013–14	Saudi Professional League	18	3	2	3	0	0	2	2	22	8
Al-Raed	Total		18	3	2	3	0	0	2	2	22	8
Career total			-	28	-	12	6	0	-	6	-	46

== International career ==
=== U-22 Career ===
Hussain started his career with the Oman national under-23 football team in 2010 when Oman participated in the 2010 Asian Games. He scored two goals in the tournament in a 3-0 win over Hong Kong in the Round of 16. Oman lost 1-0 to Iran in the quarter-finals.

In 2011, he helped his team to win the GCC U-23 Championship scoring three goals, a brace in a 3-2 win over the United Arab Emirates in the group stage and one in a 4-3 win over Saudi Arabia in the semi-finals.

He scored nine goals in Oman's journey in 2012 London Olympics qualification, a brace in the First round in a 3-1 win over Tajikistan, a goal in the Second round in a 1-0 win over China and a brace in the return leg in a 3-1 win over China, a goal in the Third round in a 2-2 draw against Qatar, a goal in a 1-1 draw against Saudi Arabia, a goal in the Playoff Round in a 1-1 draw against Syria and another in a 2-0 win over Uzbekistan. Later, Hussain was awarded with the "Top Goal Scorer" award of the competition. Oman nearly made its first appearance in football at the Summer Olympics after earning an inter-confederation play-off match with Senegal for a chance qualify for the 2012 Olympics but a 0-2 loss eliminated them from contention.

=== Goals for U-22 Team ===
Scores and results list Oman's goal tally first.

#	Date	Venue	Opponent	Score	Result	Competition
1	15 November 2010	Huangpu Sports Center, Huangpu District, Guangzhou, China	Hong Kong	1–0	3–0	2010 Asian Games
2	15 November 2010	Huangpu Sports Center, Huangpu District, Guangzhou, China	Hong Kong	2–0	3–0	2010 Asian Games
3	9 March 2011	Stadium Metallurg 1st District, Regar, Tursunzade, Tajikistan	Tajikistan	1–1	3–1	2012 Olympics Qualification
4	9 March 2011	Stadium Metallurg 1st District, Regar, Tursunzade, Tajikistan	Tajikistan	3–1	3–1	2012 Olympics Qualification
5	19 June 2011	Hongkou Football Stadium, Shanghai, China	China	1–0	1–0	2012 Olympics Qualification
8	23 June 2011	Seeb Stadium, Seeb, Oman	China	1–1	3–1	2012 Olympics Qualification
9	23 June 2011	Seeb Stadium, Seeb, Oman	China	3–1	3–1	2012 Olympics Qualification
10	14 August 2011	Aspire Dome, Doha, Qatar	United Arab Emirates	2–1	3–2	2011 GCC U-23 Championship
11	14 August 2011	Aspire Dome, Doha, Qatar	United Arab Emirates	3–1	3–2	2011 GCC U-23 Championship
12	19 August 2011	Aspire Dome, Doha, Qatar	Saudi Arabia	4–?	4–3	2011 GCC U-23 Championship
13	27 August 2011	Royal Oman Police Stadium, Muscat, Oman	Kuwait	1–0	1–0	2010 Asian Games
14	5 February 2012	Jassim Bin Hamad Stadium, Doha, Qatar	Qatar	2–1	2–2	2012 Olympics Qualification
15	14 March 2012	Prince Mohamed bin Fahd Stadium, Dammam, Saudi Arabia	Saudi Arabia	1–0	1–1	2012 Olympics Qualification
16	25 March 2012	Mỹ Đình National Stadium, Từ Liêm District, Hanoi, Vietnam	Syria	1–0	1–1	2012 Olympics Qualification
17	29 March 2012	Mỹ Đình National Stadium, Từ Liêm District, Hanoi, Vietnam	Uzbekistan	1–0	2–0	2012 Olympics Qualification

=== National team career ===
Hussain has featured for the Oman national football team since being called up for the first time in 2006 at the age of 16. He has made appearances in the 2007 AFC Asian Cup, the 2008 WAFF Championship, the 19th Arabian Gulf Cup, the 2010 FIFA World Cup qualification, the 20th Arabian Gulf Cup, the 2014 FIFA World Cup qualification and the 21st Arabian Gulf Cup and has represented the national team in the 2011 AFC Asian Cup qualification and the 2015 AFC Asian Cup qualification.

=== Goals for Senior National Team ===
Scores and results list Oman's goal tally first.

#	Date	Venue	Opponent	Score	Result	Competition
1	31 December 2009	National Stadium, Kallang, Singapore	Singapore	3–0	4–2	Friendly
2	1 November 2010	Bahrain National Stadium, Riffa, Bahrain	Bahrain	1–0	1–0	Friendly
3	9 February 2012	Sultan Qaboos Sports Complex, Muscat, Oman	Thailand	1–0	2–0	2014 FIFA World Cup Qualification
4	8 January 2012	Bahrain National Stadium, Riffa, Bahrain	Qatar	1–1	1–2	21st Arabian Gulf Cup

== Honours ==
Dhofar Club

- Omani League runner-up: 2007–08, 2008–09, 2009–10
- Sultan Qaboos Cup: 2006, 2011; runner-up: 2009
- Oman Professional League Cup: 2012-13; runner-up: 2014–15
- Oman Super Cup runner-up: 2012
- Baniyas SC International Tournament: 2014

Individual

- 2011 GCC Champions League: Top Scorer
- 2012 Summer Olympics Men's Asian Qualifiers: Top Scorer
