= Fahad Khalfan =

Fahad Khalfan may refer to:

- Fahad Khalfan (Emirati footballer)
- Fahad Khalfan (Qatari footballer)
