= James Ha =

Hong Kong footballer

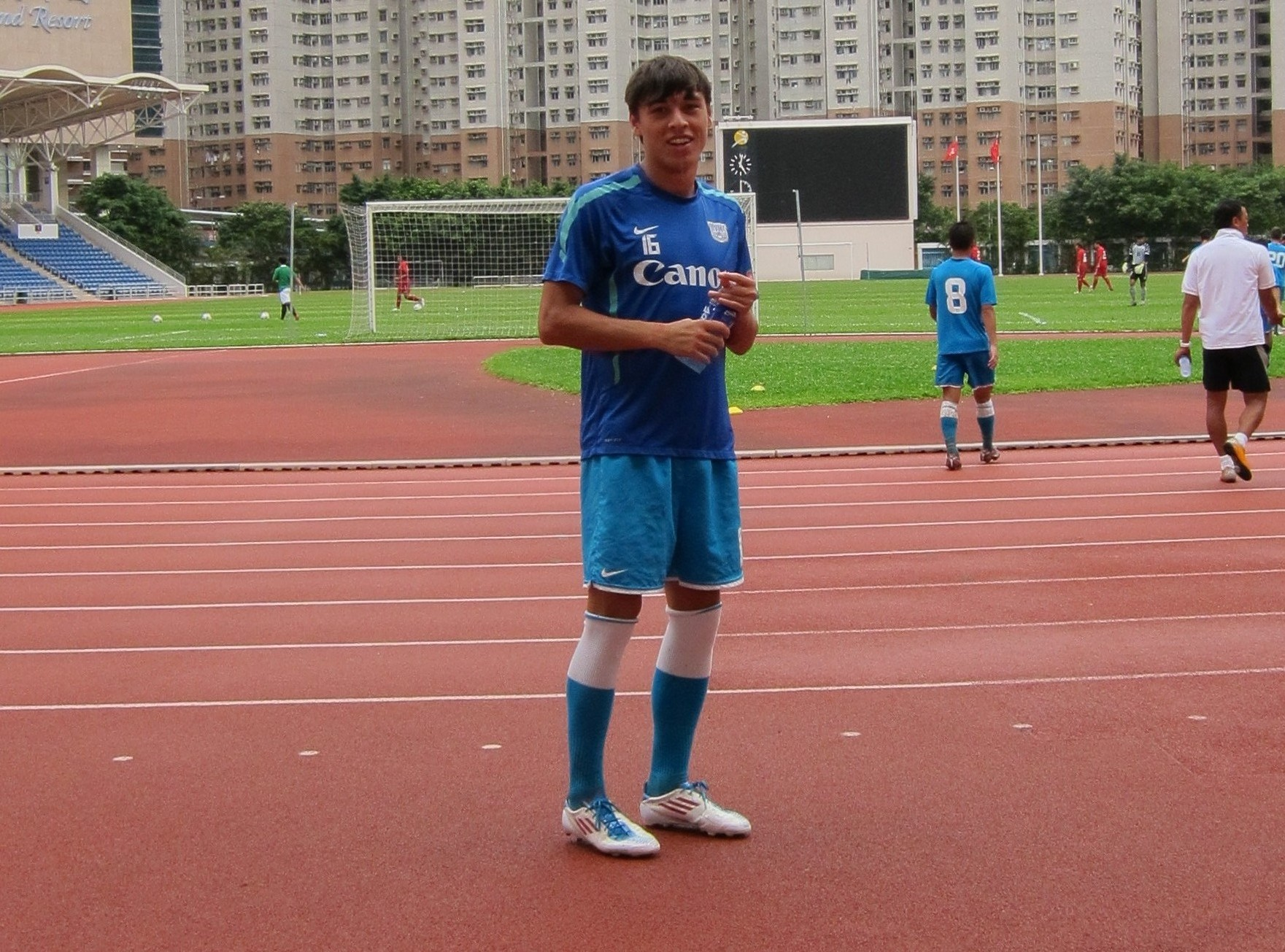
- Ha playing for Kitchee in 2011

Personal information
- Full name: James Stephen Gee Ha
- Date of birth: 26 December 1992 (age 33)
- Place of birth: Middlesbrough, England
- Height: 1.80 m (5 ft 11 in)
- Positions: Striker; winger

Youth career
- 2007–2008: Kitchee
- 2011: Birmingham City

Senior career*
Years	Team	Apps	(Gls)
2008–2009	Sha Tin	0	(0)
2009–2010	Fourway	0	(0)
2010–2011	HKFC	15	(0)
2011–2014	Kitchee	0	(0)
2013–2014	→ Sun Hei (loan)	8	(2)
2014	→ Southern (loan)	9	(0)
2014–2015	Rangers (HKG)	6	(2)
2015–2022	Southern	93	(33)

International career^{‡}
2011–2012	Hong Kong U23	8	(5)
2017–2021	Hong Kong	11	(1)
- * Club domestic league appearances and goals as of 22 May 2021 ‡ National team caps and goals as of 15 June 2021

James Stephen Gee Ha (Chinese: 夏志明, born 26 December 1992), nicknamed Bullet, is a former professional footballer who played as a striker. Born in England, he represented the Hong Kong national team internationally.

Ha was awarded Best Youth Player of Hong Kong in the 2010–11 season and best midfielder of Hong Kong Premier League in the 2018–19 season.

== Early life ==
Ha was born in Middlesbrough, England in 1992 to a family of English and Hong Kong heritage. Ha moved to Hong Kong where his father resided and grew up on Hong Kong Island at an early age.

Ha reportedly had always taken an interest in football, ever since a young age. He attended The Salvation Army Ann Wyllie Memorial School for primary education. And for high school education he attended St. Joseph's College for two years, but later transferred to St. Joan of Arc, but not for long. As Ha decided it was best to start year 12 at South Island School in 2009, in which he represented the school team as an attacking midfielder. During these years he was also selected by Hong Kong Schools Sports Federation football team for the 36th Asian Schools Football Championship.

== Club career ==
=== Early career ===
Ha had started playing for reserves matches of Kitchee since joining Kitchee academy in 2007. He left Kitchee academy to Shatin when he was 16, but he had no debut in the club. Ha entered Fourway Athletics a year later but did not have much success.

He joined HKFC before the 2010–11 season of Hong Kong First Division League. On 4 September 2010, He made his first division debut in the opening match of HKFC which drew Tai Po 1–1. In the League Cup game on 8 January 2011, he scored his first goal in formal match on the 19th-minute and Hong Kong FC defeated NT Realty Wofoo Tai Po by 2–1 lastly.

In January 2011, Kitchee signed Ha with a 1.5-year-long contract after dealing with Hong Kong FC, but Ha would continue to play in Hong Kong FC until the end of the 2010–11 season.

=== Kitchee ===
While Ha was playing in the youth tournament Mediterranean Cup as a member of Kitchee's youth academy in Spain in April 2011, Paraguayan club Guaraní approached him about playing for them in the Paraguayan Primera Division. But he concerned about playing so far away from home and rejected the offer finally.

The first appearance of Ha in Kitchee is the training match against Hong Kong national football team in Siu Sai Wan Sports Ground on 16 July 2011 for Kitchee and Hong Kong prepared 2011 Barclays Asia Trophy and 2014 FIFA World Cup qualification. His first formal appearance is in a semifinal match of the 2011 Barclays Asia Trophy against Chelsea in Hong Kong Stadium on 27 July 2011. Ha was sent to the field in the 82nd-minute to replace Roberto Losada, and Kitchee lost the game by 4 goals.

After the rejection of Guaraní's offer and the postpone of Ha's university study, the new first division team for 2013 East Asian Games has founded and James was called up by the long-term training section. Kitchee general manager Ken Ng asserted in what a choice depended on Ha and head coach Josep Gombau and Ng would make a decision after summer training in Spain. Finally, although Ha was not loaned to Hong Kong Sapling, he also left Kitchee in the short term to study in the United Kingdom.

=== Trials in Europe ===
In November 2011, Ha was in the United Kingdom playing for amateur side Salisbury City, which is owned by Hong Kong businessman Carson Yeung. Kitchee said they would not stand in his way if Yeung's Birmingham City decides to recruit him. On 8 November 2011, Birmingham City reserves lost to a couple of late goals in a private friendly at Wolverhampton Wanderers. Ha made a substitute appearance.

Ha returned to Hong Kong in January 2012 for Lunar New Year celebration and ended the two months training but Birmingham City abandoned him after the holidays. In accordance with Dani Cancela's suggestion, Kitchee sent Ha to Sevilla Atlético for further training. Lamentably, he returned to Hong Kong in early April 2012.

=== Back To Kitchee ===
After a year of academic study and trial in Europe, Kitchee general manager Ken Ng announced that Ha would be back to Kitchee in 2012–13 season.

=== Southern ===
After spending several years on loan from Kitchee, Ha transferred to Southern where he played there for seven seasons before he was released in 2022. He then retired from professional football.

== International career ==
=== 2010–11 ===
In 2010, the Hong Kong Football Association decided to play Ha in an age group above his age. Ha was just 17 when he played for the Hong Kong national under-23 football team at the exhibition matches against Guangdong under-23 team in 2010. His outstanding performance in those two exhibition matches gave rise to that he can be the regular player of Hong Kong under-23 team.

Ha was called up to the under-23 squad for the first formal game for their friendly against Chinese Taipei on 24 January 2011. He scored his under-23 international goal in the match two days later against Chinese Taipei too. For the first preliminary round of 2012 Summer Olympics against Maldives, he was sent to the field by head coach Tsang Wai Chung both two matches and he scored a total of four goals.

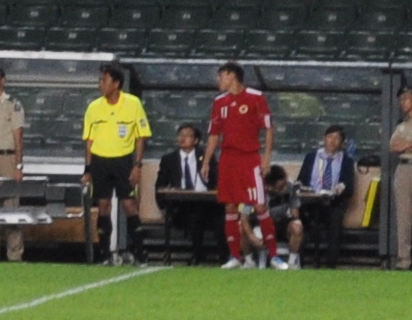
Ha (11) came off the bench on 23 June 2011

He was also named in the under-23 list squad for second preliminary round of 2012 Summer Olympics against Uzbekistan, but did not feature in the first leg at the Uzbek stadium, which lost by a goal. Before the second leg, some media in Hong Kong claimed that Ha was the 'secret weapon' of Hong Kong team. In the second leg, Hong Kong astonishingly opted defending formation and caused two losing goals to put Uzbekistan 2–0 up in 20 minutes. Ha replaced Au Yeung Yiu Chung in 34th-minute as winger and played as target man in second half. However, in a match in which Hong Kong was generally regarded as having underachieved and Uzbekistan won 3–0 on aggregate, he was widely considered one of the few successes of the Hong Kong under-23 squad.

=== 2011–12 ===
In August 2011, HKFA formed the long-term training section for 2013 East Asian Games and Ha was selected by the association. For the preparing of the games, Ha would be sent to a new first division league team consisting of members of the training section. At last, Ha did not be listed by Hong Kong Sapling and stayed in Kitchee.

After the Europe trial of Ha, new Hong Kong national football team coach Ernie Merrick selected Ha for the friendlies against Singapore and Vietnam due to absent Chan Siu Ki and Godfred Karikari.

In June 2012, Ha was chosen by Merrick for under-23 team to 2013 AFC U-22 Championship qualification in Laos. He played the opening match of the Hong Kong team as a substitute but Hong Kong lost the game by 2–3.

=== 2017–18 ===
On 5 October 2017, Ha made his international debut for Hong Kong in a friendly match against Laos.

== Honours ==
=== Individual ===
- Best Youth Player: 2010–11

== Career statistics ==
=== Club ===
As of 19 May 2021

Club performance			League		Cup		League Cup		Continental		Total	
Season	Club	League	Apps	Goals	Apps	Goals	Apps	Goals	Apps	Goals	Apps	Goals
Hong Kong			League		FA Cup & Shield		League Cup		Asia		Total	
2008–09	Shatin	Second Division	0	0	0	0	-		-		0	0
2009–10	Fourway	First Division	0	0	0	0	-		-		0	0
2010–11	HKFC	First Division	15	0	2	0	2	1	-		19	1
2011–12	Kitchee	First Division	0	0	0	0	0	0	0	0	0	0
2012–13	Kitchee	First Division	0	0	2	0	0	0	0	0	4^{1}	0
2012–13	Sun Hei	First Division	4	2	0	0	-		2	0	6	2
2013–14	Sun Hei	First Division	4	0	1	0	-		-		5	0
2013–14	Southern	First Division	7	0	1	0	-		-		8	0
2014–15	Rangers	Premier League	6	2	0	0	-		-		6	2
2015–16	Southern	Premier League	8	3	4	4	2	1	-		14	8
2016–17	Southern	Premier League	9	6	1	2	-		-		10	8
2017–18	Southern	Premier League	6	0	3	2	-		-		9	2
2018–19	Southern	Premier League	12	7	3	2	-		-		15	9
2019–20	Southern	Premier League	8	4	0	0	-		-		8	4
2020–21	Southern	Premier League	13	11	0	0	-		-		13	11
Total	Hong Kong		92	35	6	0	4	2	2	0	117	47
Career total			92	35	6	0	4	2	2	0	117	47

^{1}Including 2 games in 2012 Hong Kong–Shanghai Inter Club Championship.

=== International ===
==== Hong Kong U-23 ====
As of 3 July 2012

Hong Kong U23 appearances and goals
#	Date	Venue	Opponent	Result	Scored	Competition
2010–11
	1 January 2011	Guangdong People's Stadium, Guangzhou, China	Guangdong	4–2	0	Exhibition
	4 January 2011	Hong Kong Stadium, Hong Kong	Guangdong	2–2	1	Exhibition
1	24 January 2011	So Kon Po Recreation Ground, Hong Kong	Chinese Taipei	4–0	0	Friendly
2	26 January 2011	Sai Tso Wan Recreation Ground, Hong Kong	Chinese Taipei	1–0	1	Friendly
3	23 February 2011	Hong Kong Stadium, Hong Kong	Maldives	4–0	2	2012 AFC Men's Pre-Olympic Tournament
4	9 March 2011	Rasmee Dhandu Stadium, Malé, Maldives	Maldives	3–0	2	2012 AFC Men's Pre-Olympic Tournament
5	23 June 2011	Hong Kong Stadium, Hong Kong	Uzbekistan	0–2	0	2012 AFC Men's Pre-Olympic Tournament
6	23 June 2012	Chao Anouvong Stadium, Vientiane, Laos	Cambodia	2–3	0	2013 AFC U-22 Championship qualification
7	30 June 2012	Laos National Stadium, Vientiane, Laos	Laos	0–2	0	2013 AFC U-22 Championship qualification
8	3 July 2012	Chao Anouvong Stadium, Vientiane, Laos	Thailand	0–4	0	2013 AFC U-22 Championship qualification

==== Hong Kong ====
As of 15 June 2021

National team	Year	Apps	Goals
Hong Kong	2017	3	0
Hong Kong	2018	0	0
Hong Kong	2019	5	1
Hong Kong	2020	0	0
Hong Kong	2021	3	0
Total		11	1

=== International goals ===
Scores and results list Hong Kong's goal tally first.

No.	Date	Venue	Opponent	Score	Result	Competition
1.	19 November 2019	Hong Kong Stadium, So Kon Po, Hong Kong	Cambodia	1–0	2–0	2022 FIFA World Cup qualification

== Personal life ==
Ha has lived on Hong Kong Island for a long time and he loves playing football for leisure in Victoria Park, Causeway Bay. He thinks there are many top players in Victoria Park and he learnt a lot of skills and a sense of soccer in the park. Recently, Victoria Park has always been closed for special events, so he goes to the park at a lower frequency now. Besides football, Ha is a rugby union footballer, and won the HKFSS Inter-School Rugby Competition in 2011.

Ha is the owner of Scene 852 Productions, a new media company of creators in Hong Kong.

Awards
Preceded by Yapp Hung Fai; Kwok Kin Pong	Hong Kong Top Footballer Awards Best Youth Player; 2010–11 with To Hon To	Succeeded by Lau Cheuk Hin; Lam Hok Hei
