= Football at the 2012 Summer Olympics – Men's Asian Qualifiers Playoff Round =

2012 Olympics event

This page provides the summaries of the matches of the playoff stage of the Asian football qualifiers for the 2012 Summer Olympics.

The three runners-up from the third round groups will play each other at a neutral venue on 25, 27 and 29 March 2012 (tie-breaking play-off on 31 March if necessary). Malaysia had originally been chosen but renovations to the proposed stadium as well as the unavailability of other venues due to the scheduling of domestic fixtures meant that a new destination for the three-team playoffs was required. Vietnam was later chosen by the AFC Competitions Committee as the neutral venue, with games to be played at Hanoi's Mỹ Đình National Stadium

The winner of this group will advance to play the fourth-ranked team of the African qualification tournament in a play-off for a spot at the Olympic Games.

== Playoff Group ==
Team	Pld	W	D	L	GF	GA	GD	Pts
Oman	2	1	1	0	3	1	+2	4
Uzbekistan	2	1	0	1	2	3	−1	3
Syria	2	0	1	1	2	3	−1	1

25 March 2012
19:05 UTC+7

Syria	1 – 1	Oman
Al Douni 90+5'	Report	Al-Hadhri 44' (pen.)

Mỹ Đình National Stadium, Hanoi
Attendance: 1,500
Referee: Benjamin Williams (Australia)

27 March 2012
20:00 UTC+7

Uzbekistan	2 – 1	Syria
Turaev 73'; Zoteev 88'	Report	Shahen 14'

Mỹ Đình National Stadium, Hanoi
Attendance: 1,000
Referee: Alireza Faghani (Iran)

29 March 2012
19:00 UTC+7

Oman	2 – 0	Uzbekistan
Al-Hadhri 16' (pen.); Saleh 45+2'	Report

Mỹ Đình National Stadium, Hanoi
Attendance: 1,300
Referee: Malik Abdul Bashir (Singapore)

== Goalscorers ==
2 goals

- (Oman) Hussain Al-Hadhri

1 goal

- (Oman) Raed Ibrahim Saleh
- (Syria) Yasser Shahen
- (Syria) Ahmad Al Douni
- (Uzbekistan) Kenja Turaev
- (Uzbekistan) Oleg Zoteev
