= Football at the 2012 Summer Olympics – Men's Asian qualifiers preliminary round 2 =

This page provides the summary of the second round qualifiers for the group stage of the Asian football qualifiers for 2012 Olympics. The matches in this round were held on 19 June 2011 (first leg) and 23 June 2011 (second leg).

== Seeding for the draw ==
12 teams have been seeded and 12 unseeded on the basis of ranking of Asian qualifiers and final round of 2008 Beijing Olympics men’s football tournament. The draw was held on 30 March 2011 in AFC House.

Seeded Teams	Unseeded Teams
1. South Korea; 2. Australia; 3. China; 4. Japan; 5. Iraq; 6. Bahrain; 7. Qatar; 8. Saudi Arabia; 9. North Korea; 10. Syria; 11. Lebanon; 12. Uzbekistan	13. Vietnam; 14. Kuwait; 15. Oman; 16. United Arab Emirates; 17. Iran; 18. Malaysia; 19. Yemen; 20. Hong Kong; 21. Jordan; 22. India; 23. Turkmenistan; 24. Palestine

== Matches ==
Team 1	Agg.	Team 2	1st leg	2nd leg
Qatar	4–2	India	3–1	1–1
Iraq	5–0	Iran	3–0	2–0
Bahrain	(a)2–2	Palestine	0–1	2–1
Australia	7–0	Yemen	3–0	4–0
Japan	4–3	Kuwait	3–1	1–2
Syria	6–2	Turkmenistan	2–2	4–0
North Korea	1–2	United Arab Emirates	0–1	1–1
South Korea	4–2	Jordan	3–1	1–1
Uzbekistan	3–0	Hong Kong	1–0	2–0
Saudi Arabia	6–1	Vietnam	2–0	4–1
China	1–4 (a.e.t.)	Oman	0–1	1–3
Lebanon	1–2	Malaysia	0–0	1–2

=== First leg ===
19 June 2011
19:15 UTC+03:00

Qatar	3 – 1	India
Al-Khalfan 15'; Al Haidos 54'; El Neel 69'	Report	Lalpekhlua 7'

Jassim Bin Hamad Stadium, Doha
Attendance: 3,518
Referee: Mohamed Al Zarooni (United Arab Emirates)

19 June 2011
18:00 UTC+03:00

Iraq	3 – 0 (awarded)	Iran
	Report	Mosalman 30'

Franso Hariri Stadium, Arbil
Attendance: 18,000
Referee: Choi Myung-Yong (South Korea)

19 June 2011
19:00 UTC+03:00

Bahrain	0 – 1	Palestine
	Report	Salem 72'

Bahrain National Stadium, Riffa
Attendance: 300
Referee: Minoru Tōjō (Japan)

19 June 2011
15:00 UTC+10:00

Australia	3 – 0	Yemen
Hoffman 14', 90'; Nichols 67'	Report

Central Coast Stadium, Gosford
Attendance: 2,597
Referee: Tan Hai (China PR)

19 June 2011
19:10 UTC+09:00

Japan	3 – 1	Kuwait
Kiyotake 18'; Hamada 37'; Osako 61'	Report	Jaber Jazaa 68'

Toyota Stadium, Toyota
Attendance: 17,873
Referee: Alireza Faghani (Iran)

19 June 2011
19:00 UTC+03:00

Syria	2 – 2	Turkmenistan
Al Jafal 29'; Al Somah 53'	Report	Boliýan 50'; Orazsähedow 79'

Prince Mohammed Stadium, Zarqa (Jordan)
Attendance: 50
Referee: Abdullah Balideh (Qatar)

19 June 2011
16:00 UTC+09:00

North Korea	0 – 1	United Arab Emirates
	Report	M. Ahmed 56'

Kim Il-sung Stadium, Pyongyang
Attendance: 47,000
Referee: Saeid Mozaffarizadeh (Iran)

19 June 2011
15:00 UTC+09:00

South Korea	3 – 1	Jordan
Kim Tae-Hwan 54'; Yoon Bit-Garam 75' (pen.); Kim Dong-Sub 85'	Report	Za'tara 45'

Seoul World Cup Stadium, Seoul
Attendance: 35,224
Referee: Peter Green (Australia)

19 June 2011
19:00 UTC+05:00

Uzbekistan	1 – 0	Hong Kong
Musaev 58'	Report

JAR Stadium, Tashkent
Attendance: 6,000
Referee: Andre El Haddad (Lebanon)

19 June 2011
20:45 UTC+03:00

Saudi Arabia	2 – 0	Vietnam
Al-Faraj 43'; Nguyễn Văn Hậu 90+1' (o.g.)	Report

Prince Sultan Bin Abdulaziz Sports City, Abha
Attendance: 1,000
Referee: Hiroyoshi Takayama (Japan)

19 June 2011
20:00 UTC+08:00

China	0 – 1	Oman
	Report	Al-Hadhri 4'

Hongkou Football Stadium, Shanghai
Attendance: 13,500
Referee: Ben Williams (Australia)

19 June 2011
17:00 UTC+03:00

Lebanon	0 – 0	Malaysia
	Report

Sports City Stadium, Beirut
Attendance: 800
Referee: Abdullah Al Hilali (Oman)

=== Second leg ===
23 June 2011
19:00 UTC+05:30

India	1 – 1	Qatar
Muftah 53' (o.g.)	Report	El Neel 73'

Shiv Chhatrapati Sports Complex, Balewadi
Attendance: 2,500
Referee: Valentin Kovalenko (Uzbekistan)

Qatar won 4–2 on aggregate.

23 June 2011
20:00 UTC+04:30

Iran	0 – 2	Iraq
	Report	Radhi 35', 63'

Azadi Stadium, Tehran
Attendance: 18,739
Referee: Yuichi Nishimura (Japan)

Iraq won 5-0 on aggregate due to Iran using a banned player during the first match.

23 June 2011
17:00 UTC+03:00

Palestine	1 – 2	Bahrain
Salem 44'	Report	Saeed 54'; Mubarak 60'

Faisal Al-Husseini International Stadium, Al-Ram
Attendance: 15,000
Referee: Vo Minh Tri (Vietnam)

2–2 on aggregate. Bahrain won on the away goals rule.

23 June 2011
18:30 UTC+10:00

Yemen	0 – 4	Australia
	Report	Hoffman 18', 31', 52'; Mooy 68'

Ausgrid Stadium, Newcastle (Australia)
Attendance: 3,009
Referee: Abdulrahman Abdou (Qatar)

Australia won 7–0 on aggregate.

23 June 2011
19:45 UTC+03:00

Kuwait	2 – 1	Japan
Aman 48'; Nasser 59' (pen.)	Report	Sakai 21'

Mohammed Al-Hamad Stadium, Hawalli
Attendance: 4,500
Referee: Ravshan Irmatov (Uzbekistan)

Japan won 4–3 on aggregate.

23 June 2011
18:00 UTC+05:00

Turkmenistan	0 – 4	Syria
	Report	Al Soma 10'; Jafal 45'; Zbida 66'; Afa Al Rifai 80'

Olympic Stadium, Ashgabat
Attendance: 17,000
Referee: Kim Sang-Woo (South Korea)

Syria won 6–2 on aggregate.

23 June 2011
19:45 UTC+04:00

United Arab Emirates	1 – 1	North Korea
Al Kamali 34' (pen.)	Report	Ri Jin-Hyok 18'

Tahnoun bin Mohammed Stadium, Al Ain
Attendance: 8,000
Referee: Khalil Al-Ghamdi (Saudi Arabia)

United Arab Emirates won 2–1 on aggregate.

23 June 2011
18:00 UTC+03:00

Jordan	1 – 1	South Korea
Dardour 42'	Report	Hong Chul 71'

Amman International Stadium, Amman
Attendance: 1,350
Referee: Malik Abdul Bashir (Singapore)

South Korea won 4–2 on aggregate.

23 June 2011
20:00 UTC+08:00

Hong Kong	0 – 2	Uzbekistan
	Report	Musaev 8'; Abdukhaliqov 19'

Hong Kong Stadium, So Kon Po
Attendance: 2,787
Referee: Chaiya Mahapab (Thailand)

Uzbekistan won 3–0 on aggregate.

23 June 2011
19:15 UTC+07:00

Vietnam	1 – 4	Saudi Arabia
Lê Văn Thắng 44'	Report	Al Abed 10'; S. Hassan 28'; I. Hassan 57' (pen.); Jaizawi 84'

Mỹ Đình National Stadium, Hanoi
Attendance: 15,000
Referee: Kim Dong-Jin (South Korea)

Saudi Arabia won 6–1 on aggregate.

23 June 2011
18:15 UTC+04:00

Oman	3 – 1 (a.e.t.)	China
Al-Hadhri 94', 118'; Abdul-Karim 114'	Report	Wu Xi 69'

Seeb Stadium, Seeb
Attendance: 4,020
Referee: Mohsen Torky (Iran)

Oman won 4–1 on aggregate.

23 June 2011
20:45 UTC+08:00

Malaysia	2 – 1	Lebanon
Irfan 9'; Wan Zack Haikal 41'	Report	Atie 63'

National Stadium, Kuala Lumpur
Attendance: 10,800
Referee: Toma Maasaki (Japan)

Malaysia won 2–1 on aggregate.
