= Football at the 2012 Summer Olympics – Men's Asian qualifiers preliminary round 1 =

Preliminary Round 1 of the Men's Asian Qualifiers for the 2012 Olympic football tournament was held on 23 February 2011 and 9 March 2011. It was played in a two-legged system. The draw was made on October 20, 2010. The 11 winners from the preliminary round will join the 13 higher ranked teams in two-legged knock-out ties to be played on 19 and 23 June 2011.

== Seeding for the draw ==
11 teams have been seeded and 11 unseeded on the basis of ranking of Asian qualifiers and final round of 2008 Beijing Olympics men's football tournament:

Seeded	Unseeded
Hong Kong; India; Indonesia; Iran; Jordan; Kuwait; Malaysia; Oman; Thailand; United Arab Emirates; Yemen	Bangladesh; Chinese Taipei; Kyrgyzstan; Maldives; Myanmar; Pakistan; Palestine; Singapore; Sri Lanka; Tajikistan; Turkmenistan

== Matches ==
Team 1	Agg.	Team 2	1st leg	2nd leg
Thailand	0–4	Palestine	0–3	0–1
Jordan	3–0	Chinese Taipei	1–0	2–0
Yemen	3–0	Singapore	2–0	1–0
Kuwait	5–0	Bangladesh	2–0	3–0
Malaysia	2–0	Pakistan	2–0	0–0
United Arab Emirates	10–1	Sri Lanka	7–1	3–0
India	3–2	Myanmar	2–1	1–1
Oman	7–2	Tajikistan	4–1	3–1
Indonesia	1–4	Turkmenistan	1–3	0–1
Iran	1–0	Kyrgyzstan	1–0	0–0
Hong Kong	7–0	Maldives	4–0	3–0

=== First leg ===
23 February 2011
18:00 UTC+07:00

Thailand	0 – 3	Palestine
Narat 43'	Report

Suphachalasai Stadium, Bangkok
Attendance: 6,000
Referee: Kim Sang-Woo (South Korea)

Palestine was awarded a 3-0 win to Palestine after Thailand fielding an ineligible player, Sujarit Jantakul. The original score was 1–0 to Thailand.

23 February 2011
19:00 UTC+03:00

Jordan	1 – 0	Chinese Taipei
Bani Attiah 83'	Report

King Abdullah Stadium, Amman
Attendance: 2,000
Referee: Ali Abdulnabi (Bahrain)

23 February 2011
18:20 UTC+03:00

Kuwait	2 – 0	Bangladesh
Ali 43'; Al-Shaqqath 47'	Report

Mohammed Al-Hamad Stadium, Hawally
Attendance: 1,000
Referee: Ali Sabbagh (Lebanon)

23 February 2011
20:45 UTC+08:00

Malaysia	2 – 0	Pakistan
Zaharulnizam 4'; Irfan 45+4'	Report

Shah Alam Stadium, Shah Alam
Attendance: 6,596
Referee: Liu Kwok Man (Hong Kong)

23 February 2011
19:00 UTC+05:30

India	2 – 1	Myanmar
Lalpekhlua 24'; Malsawmfela 40'	Report	Mai Aih Naing 33'

Shree Shiv Chhatrapati Sports Complex, Pune
Attendance: 2,000
Referee: Tayeb Hasan (Bangladesh)

23 February 2011
18:30 UTC+04:00

Oman	4 – 1	Tajikistan
Eid Mohammed 19', 65'; Al Jalaboubi 35'; Al-Naaimi 47'	Report	Shohzukhurov 13' (pen.)

Seeb Stadium, Muscat
Attendance: 300
Referee: Mohammad Mousa Abu Loum (Jordan)

23 February 2011
17:00 UTC+07:00

Indonesia	1 – 3	Turkmenistan
Bonai 14'	Report	Amanow 17'; Boliyan 80'; Orazsähedow 86'

Gelora Sriwijaya Stadium, Palembang
Attendance: 25,000
Referee: Lee Min-Hu (South Korea)

23 February 2011
15:00 UTC+03:30

Iran	1 – 0	Kyrgyzstan
Rahmani 33'	Report

Azadi Stadium, Tehran
Attendance: 176
Referee: Chaiya Mahapab (Thailand)

23 February 2011
20:00 UTC+08:00

Hong Kong	4 – 0	Maldives
To Hon To 1', 86'; Yuen Tsun Nam 64'; J. Ha 83'	Report

Hong Kong Stadium, Hong Kong
Attendance: 1,528
Referee: Vo Minh Tri (Vietnam)

8 March 2011
19:15 UTC+04:00

United Arab Emirates	7 – 1	Sri Lanka
A. Khalil 7', 54'; R. Essa 15', 22'; Al Kamali 38' (pen.); Ali 63'; Ali Mabkhout 66'	Report	Mohamed 61'

Baniyas Stadium, Bani Yas
Attendance: 3,000
Referee: Kadhum Auda (Iraq)

19 March 2011
19:45 UTC+04:00

Yemen	2 – 0	Singapore
Al-Haghri 38'; Al Anbari 50'	Report

Sheikh Khalifa International Stadium, Al Ain
Attendance: 200
Referee: Lee Min-Hu (South Korea)

=== Second leg ===
9 March 2011
18:00 UTC+02:00

Palestine	1 – 0 (a.e.t.)	Thailand
Abu Habib 45'	Report
Penalties
(may not be in correct order); Nadim Baragtha (penalty scored); Hisham Ali (penalty scored); Khaled Salem (penalty scored); Muath Abdallah (penalty scored); Ahmed Miari (penalty scored); Amjad Al Fawaghra (penalty missed); Fayez Isaili (penalty missed)	5–6	(may not be in correct order); (penalty scored) Seeket Madputeh; (penalty scored) Chalermsuk Kaewsuktae; (penalty scored) Kroekrit Thaweekarn; (penalty scored) Phuritad Jarikanon; (penalty scored) Pokklaw Anan; (penalty scored) Weerawut Kayem; (penalty missed) Attapong Nooprom

Faisal Al-Husseini International Stadium, West Bank
Attendance: 16,000
Referee: Banjar Al-Dosari (Qatar)

1–1 on aggregate. Thailand won after penalties, but Palestine will replace them in the second round after fielding an ineligible player.

9 March 2011
17:00 UTC+06:00

Bangladesh	0 – 3	Kuwait
	Report	Al Ansari 2'; Al Sulaiman 45+1', 89'

Bangabandhu National Stadium, Dhaka
Attendance: 2,500
Referee: Apisit Aonrak (Thailand)

Kuwait won 5–0 on aggregate.

9 March 2011
19:00 UTC+08:00

Chinese Taipei	0 – 2	Jordan
	Report	Za'tara 28'; Al-Rawashdeh 89'

Taipei Municipal Stadium, Taipei
Attendance: 3,500
Referee: Kim Sang-Woo (South Korea)

Jordan won 3–0 on aggregate.

9 March 2011
16:00 UTC+05:00

Maldives	0 – 3	Hong Kong
	Report	Lam Hok Hei 19', 45+1'; J. Ha 23'

Rasmee Dhandu Stadium, Malé
Attendance: 2,000
Referee: Ali Sabbagh (Lebanon)

Hong Kong won 7–0 on aggregate.

9 March 2011
15:00 UTC+06:00

Kyrgyzstan	0 – 0	Iran
	Report

Spartak Stadium, Bishkek
Attendance: 11,500
Referee: Mohammad Mousa Abu Loum (Jordan)

Iran won 1–0 on aggregate.

9 March 2011
18:00 UTC+05:00

Turkmenistan	1 – 0	Indonesia
Mingazov 25'	Report

Olympic Stadium, Ashgabat
Attendance: 28,000
Referee: Ali Abdulnabi (Bahrain)

Turkmenistan won 4–1 on aggregate.

9 March 2011
13:00 UTC+05:00

Tajikistan	1 – 3	Oman
Tukhtasunov 42'	Report	Al-Hadhri 49', 73' (pen.); Al-Jaljobi 52'

Stadium Metallurg 1st District, Tursunzoda
Attendance: 2,800
Referee: Tayeb Hasan (Bangladesh)

Oman won 7–2 on aggregate.

9 March 2011
16:00 UTC+06:30

Myanmar	1 – 1	India
Kyaw Ko Ko 64'	Report	Sabeeth 90'

Thuwunna Stadium, Yangon
Attendance: 12,000
Referee: Ryuji Sato (Japan)

India won 3–2 on aggregate.

9 March 2011
20:00 UTC+05:00

Pakistan	0 – 0	Malaysia
	Report

Punjab Football Stadium, Lahore
Attendance: 4,500
Referee: Vo Minh Tri (Vietnam)

Malaysia won 2–0 on aggregate.

11 March 2011
19:15 UTC+04:00

Sri Lanka	0 – 3	United Arab Emirates
	Report	R. Essa 19'; A. Khalil 27', 41'

Baniyas Stadium, Baniyas (United Arab Emirates)
Attendance: 1,253
Referee: Chaiya Mahapab (Thailand)

United Arab Emirates won 10–1 on aggregate.

21 March 2011
19:45 UTC+04:00

Singapore	0 – 1	Yemen
	Report	Al Anbari 14'

Sheikh Khalifa International Stadium, Al Ain
Attendance: 150
Referee: Banjar Al-Dosari (Qatar)

Yemen won 3–0 on aggregate.

- Note: Sri Lanka's home game was played away (in United Arab Emirates).
