= Football at the 2012 Summer Olympics – Men's Asian Qualifiers =

Tournament details
- Dates: February 2011 – March 2012
- Teams: 35 (from 1 confederation)

The Asian Football Confederation's Pre-Olympic Tournament was the qualifying tournament for the 2012 Summer Olympics Football tournament in London. Thirty-five teams entered the qualification, where AFC have three spots for automatic qualifiers and a spot for inter-continental play-off against the fourth representative of the Pre-Olympic Tournament in African zone. The competition commenced in February 2011 and was completed in March 2012.

== Seeding ==
35 teams entered for the tournament. The top 13 teams based on the qualifiers and final round of the previous Olympics were given byes to the first round.

Top 13 seeds

- Australia
- Bahrain
- China
- Iraq
- Japan
- Lebanon
- North Korea
- Qatar
- Saudi Arabia
- South Korea
- Syria
- Uzbekistan
- Vietnam

Bottom 22 seeds

- Bangladesh
- Chinese Taipei
- Hong Kong
- India
- Indonesia
- Iran
- Jordan
- Kuwait
- Kyrgyzstan
- Malaysia
- Maldives
- Myanmar
- Oman
- Pakistan
- Palestine
- Singapore
- Sri Lanka
- Tajikistan
- Thailand
- Turkmenistan
- United Arab Emirates
- Yemen

Teams did not enter

- Afghanistan
- Bhutan
- Brunei
- Cambodia
- Guam
- Laos
- Macau (Not eligible)
- Mongolia
- Nepal
- Philippines
- Timor-Leste

== Preliminary round 1 ==
The 22 lowest ranked teams competed in the preliminary round. Two-legged knock-out ties were played on 23 February and 9 March 2011. The draw was held on 20 October 2010.

Team 1	Agg.	Team 2	1st leg	2nd leg
Thailand	0–4	Palestine	0–3^{1}	0–1
Jordan	3–0	Chinese Taipei	1–0	2–0
Yemen	3–0	Singapore	2–0	1–0
Kuwait	5–0	Bangladesh	2–0	3–0
Malaysia	2–0	Pakistan	2–0	0–0
United Arab Emirates	10–1	Sri Lanka	7–1	3–0
India	3–2	Myanmar	2–1	1–1
Oman	7–2	Tajikistan	4–1	3–1
Indonesia	1–4	Turkmenistan	1–3	0–1
Iran	1–0	Kyrgyzstan	1–0	0–0
Hong Kong	7–0	Maldives	4–0	3–0

Note 1: Palestine awarded 3 – 0 victory in the first leg after Thailand fielded an ineligible player. The original score was 0 – 1.

== Preliminary round 2 ==
The 11 winners from the preliminary round joined the 13 highest ranked teams into the second round. Two-legged knock-out ties were played on 19 and 23 June 2011. The draw was held on 30 March 2011.

Team 1	Agg.	Team 2	1st leg	2nd leg
Qatar	4–2	India	3–1	1–1
Iraq	5–0	Iran	3–0^{1}	2–0
Bahrain	2–2 (a)	Palestine	0–1	2–1
Australia	7–0	Yemen	3–0	4–0
Japan	4–3	Kuwait	3–1	1–2
Syria	6–2	Turkmenistan	2–2	4–0
North Korea	1–2	United Arab Emirates	0–1	1–1
South Korea	4–2	Jordan	3–1	1–1
Uzbekistan	3–0	Hong Kong	1–0	2–0
Saudi Arabia	6–1	Vietnam	2–0	4–1
China	1–4 (a.e.t.)	Oman	0–1	1–3
Lebanon	1–2	Malaysia	0–0	1–2

Note 1: Iraq awarded 3 – 0 victory in the first leg after Iran fielded a suspended player. The original result was a 1–0 win for Iran.

== Preliminary round 3 ==
The 12 winners from the second round were divided into 3 groups of 4. The winner of each group advanced to the Olympic Games while each runner-up advanced to the play-off round. The draw was held on July 7, 2011, in Kuala Lumpur, Malaysia.

Matches were played on 21 September 2011, 23 and 27 November 2011, 5 and 22 February 2012 and 14 March 2012.

=== Group A ===
Team	Pld	W	D	L	GF	GA	GD	Pts
South Korea	6	3	3	0	8	2	+6	12
Oman	6	2	2	2	8	8	0	8
Qatar	6	1	4	1	6	8	−2	7
Saudi Arabia	6	0	3	3	4	8	−4	3

	(Oman)	(Qatar)	(Saudi Arabia)	(South Korea)
Oman	–	3–0	2–0	0–3
Qatar	2–2	–	2–1	1–1
Saudi Arabia	1–1	1–1	–	1–1
South Korea	2–0	0–0	1–0	–

=== Group B ===
Team	Pld	W	D	L	GF	GA	GD	Pts
United Arab Emirates	6	4	2	0	8	2	+6	14
Uzbekistan	6	2	2	2	7	5	+2	8
Iraq	6	1	2	3	2	7	−5	5
Australia	6	0	4	2	0	3	−3	4

	(Australia)	(Iraq)	(United Arab Emirates)	(Uzbekistan)
Australia	–	0–0	0–0	0–0
Iraq	0–0	–	0–1	2–1
United Arab Emirates	1–0	3–0	–	0–0
Uzbekistan	2–0	2–0	2–3	–

=== Group C ===
Team	Pld	W	D	L	GF	GA	GD	Pts
Japan	6	5	0	1	13	3	+10	15
Syria	6	4	0	2	12	6	+6	12
Bahrain	6	3	0	3	8	11	−3	9
Malaysia	6	0	0	6	3	16	−13	0

	(Bahrain)	(Japan)	(Malaysia)	(Syria)
Bahrain	–	0–2	2–1	2–1
Japan	2–0	–	2–0	2–1
Malaysia	2–3	0–4	–	0–2
Syria	3–1	2–1	3–0	–

== Play-off round ==
The three runners-up from the third round groups played each other at a neutral venue on 25, 27 and 29 March 2012. Malaysia had originally been chosen but renovations to the proposed stadium as well as the unavailability of other venues due to the scheduling of domestic fixtures meant that a new destination for the three-team playoffs was required. Vietnam was later chosen by the AFC Competitions Committee as the neutral venue, with games played at Hanoi's Mỹ Đình National Stadium.

Oman was the winner of this group advanced to play Senegal in a play-off for a spot at the Olympic Games.

Team	Pld	W	D	L	GF	GA	GD	Pts
Oman	2	1	1	0	3	1	+2	4
Uzbekistan	2	1	0	1	2	3	−1	3
Syria	2	0	1	1	2	3	−1	1

	(Oman)	(Syria)	(Uzbekistan)
Oman	–	1–1	2–0
Syria	–	–	1–2
Uzbekistan	–	–	–

== Qualified teams for Olympics ==
The following three teams from AFC qualified for the Olympic football tournament.

Team	Qualified on	Previous appearances in tournament^{1}
South Korea	22 February 2012	8 (1948, 1964, 1988, 1992, 1996, 2000, 2004, 2008)
Japan	14 March 2012	8 (1936, 1956, 1964, 1968, 1996, 2000, 2004, 2008)
United Arab Emirates	14 March 2012	0 (None)

^{1} Italic indicates host for that year. Statistics include all Olympic format (current Olympic under-23 format started in 1992).

== See also ==
- Football at the 2012 Summer Olympics
- Football at the 2012 Summer Olympics – Women's Asian Qualifiers
