= Mahmoud Za'tara =

Jordanian footballer

Personal information
- Full name: Mahmoud Salim Za'tara
- Date of birth: 8 January 1991 (age 35)
- Place of birth: Amman, Jordan
- Height: 1.83 m (6 ft 0 in)
- Position: Striker

Team information
- Current team: Dougra

Youth career
- 2005–2010: Al-Faisaly

Senior career*
Years	Team	Apps	(Gls)
2010–2011	Al-Faisaly	2	(0)
2011	Al-Suwaiq	4	(1)
2012	Al-Arabi	10	(5)
2012–2013	Al-Yarmouk	16	(6)
2013–2014	Al-Busaiteen	9	(6)
2014–2015	Al-Wehdat	17	(10)
2015–2016	Muaither	30	(22)
2017	Al-Salmiya	3	(1)
2017–2018	Al-Wehdat	6	(0)
2018–2019	Al-Ahli	5	(2)
2018–2019	Al-Jazeera	4	(1)
2020–2021	Al-Salt	15	(9)
2022	Sri Pahang	6	(1)
2022-2023	Al-Jazeera		
2023-2024	Al-Wehdat		
2024-	Dougra		

International career^{‡}
2009–2010	Jordan U19		(4)
2012–2014	Jordan U22		(8)
2010–2011	Jordan U23		(6)
2012–2015	Jordan	13	(0)
- * Club domestic league appearances and goals as of 18:59, 19 January 2021 (UTC) ‡ National team caps and goals as of 15 November 2016

Mahmoud Salim Za'tara (Arabic: محمود سليم زعترة) is a Jordanian footballer who plays as a striker for Jordanian club Dougra.

== International career ==
Za'tara's first match with the Jordan national senior team was against Uzbekistan in an international friendly in Amman on 13 August 2012, which Jordan lost 1–0.

== Career statistics ==
=== International ===
U-19
#	Date	Venue	Opponent	Score	Result	Competition
1	25 October 2009	Kathmandu,	Palestine	3–1	Win	2010 AFC U-19 Championship qualification
2	1 November 2009	Kathmandu	Nepal	3–2	Win	2010 AFC U-19 Championship qualification
3	4 November 2009	Kathmandu	Tajikistan	2–0	Win	2010 AFC U-19 Championship qualification
4	4 October 2010	Zibo	Vietnam	1–2	Loss	2010 AFC U-19 Championship

U-22
#	Date	Venue	Opponent	Score	Result	Competition
1	27 May 2012	Amman	Lebanon	5–0	Win	Friendly
2	16 June 2012	Kathmandu	Yemen	4–0	Win	2013 AFC U-22 Championship qualification
3	20 June 2012	Kathmandu	Bangladesh	3–0	Win	2013 AFC U-22 Championship qualification
4	20 June 2012	Kathmandu	Bangladesh	3–0	Win	2013 AFC U-22 Championship qualification
5	22 June 2012	Kathmandu	Nepal	3–0	Win	2013 AFC U-22 Championship qualification
6	2 July 2013	Manama	Bahrain	2–2	Draw	Friendly
7	6 January 2014	Nizwa	China	2–1	Loss	Friendly
8	15 January 2014	Muscat	Myanmar	6–1	Win	2014 AFC U-22 Championship

U-23
#	Date	Venue	Opponent	Score	Result	Competition
1	28 February 2010	Kuwait city	Kuwait	2–2	Draw	Friendly
2	24 December 2010	Zarqa	Kuwait	3–0	Win	Friendly
3	9 March 2011	Taipei	Chinese Taipei	2–0	Win	2012 Summer Olympics Qualifiers
4	5 June 2011	Amman	Bahrain	1–1	Draw	Friendly
5	8 June 2011	Amman	Lebanon	1–1	Draw	Friendly
6	19 June 2011	Seoul	South Korea	3–1	Loss	2012 Summer Olympics Qualifiers

As of 15 November 2016

Jordan national team
Year	Apps	Goals
2012	1	0
2014	2	0
2015	2	0
2016	1	0
Total	6	0
