= Regar =

Social group of India

The Regar (also spelled as Raigar, Rehgar, Raigarh, Ranigar and Rehgarh) are a caste group of India. They are sometimes associated with the Chamar caste but, for example, the sociologist Bela Bhatia considers them to be distinct. The Regar are found in the states of Punjab, Haryana, Gujarat, Himachal Pradesh and Rajasthan. They are known as Regar in the Mewar region of Rajasthan.

Once leatherworkers, at the beginning of the 20th century, the British Raj administration imposed restrictions on the indigenous manufacturing of saltpetre which destroyed their livelihood. At least some community members served as bonded labour (begari) during the British Raj era. Many today work in agriculture.

They have been described as an untouchable caste by anthropologist Maya Unnithan-Kumar and as Dalits by another anthropologist, Mary Grey, and by Bhatia. (Note: Dalit is essentially a more recent term for Untouchable.)
