= Mỹ Đình National Stadium =

Stadium in Hanoi, Vietnam

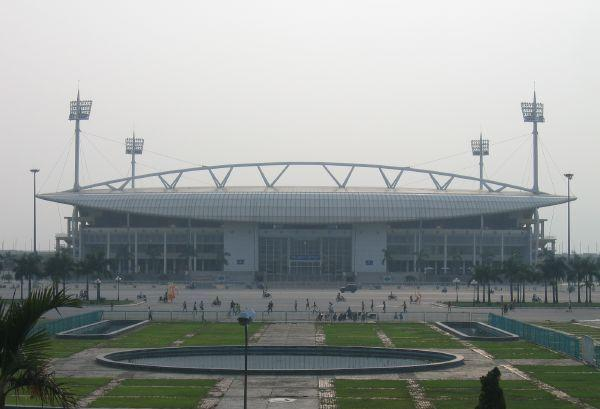
- Mỹ Đình National Stadium from outside
- Interactive map of Mỹ Đình National Stadium
- Address: No. 1 Lê Đức Thọ Rd, Từ Liêm Ward, Hanoi; Vietnam
- Coordinates: 21°1′14″N 105°45′49.7″E
- Owner: Government of Vietnam
- Operator: Vietnam Ministry of National Defence
- Capacity: 40,192 (fixed capacity); 50,000 (maximum capacity)
- Surface: Zeon Zoysia
- Record attendance: 50,000 (Vietnam U-19 0–1 Japan U-19, 13/09/2014)

Construction
- Groundbreaking: 2002; 24 years ago
- Built: 2002–2003
- Opened: 2 September 2003; 23 years ago
- Renovated: 7 September 2016; 10 years ago
- Cost: US$53 million
- Architects: Hanoi International Group, HISG

Tenants
- Vietnam national football team (selected matches); Vietnam women's national football team (Selected matches); Hanoi FC (2023–24 AFC Champions League); The Cong–Viettel (2024–present)

The Mỹ Đình National Stadium (Vietnamese: Sân vận động Quốc gia Mỹ Đình) is a multi-purpose stadium in Từ Liêm Ward (formerly Nam Từ Liêm District), Hanoi, Vietnam. It has a capacity of 40,192 seats and is the centerpiece of Vietnam's National Sports Complex (Khu liên hợp thể thao quốc gia). It was officially opened in September 2003 and was the main venue for the Southeast Asian Games later that year, hosting the opening and closing ceremony as well as the men's football and athletics events.

The stadium is home to the Vietnam national football team, and hosts its home international matches. The stadium also hosted the 2007 AFC Asian Cup.

Located 10 kilometres north-west of central Hanoi, the 40,192-seat stadium is the biggest in the country in terms of capacity and was built at a cost of US$53 million. Arched roofs cover the grandstands on the east and west sides of the arena, providing shelter for half of the seats. The area provides training facilities for the teams with two football training grounds located next to the stadium.

Since 2021, the stadium has attracted complaints mainly about the quality of the pitch, starting with its hosting of the Vietnam–Australia match in the third AFC qualification round of the 2022 FIFA World Cup. It has since come under further scrutiny after hosting Borussia Dortmund in an international friendly, of which the goalpost was broken mid-game, and Southeast Asian teams in the 2022 AFF Championship. The delay in the renovation of Mỹ Đình Stadium, despite the huge funding provided by the Vietnamese government, has led to several allegations of corruption and lack of financial transparency on the part of the Stadium Management Board.

In 2026, it was announced that the management of the entire complex would be transferred to the Vietnam Ministry of National Defence, which oversees Thể Công–Viettel FC.

== History ==
Ideas for a new national stadium in Vietnam were marked up in 1998 as the government conducted a prefeasibility study for a national sports complex. In July 2000, Vietnamese Prime Minister Phan Văn Khải approved a project of a stadium at the heart of Vietnam's National Sports Complex in preparation for hosting the 2003 Southeast Asian Games. Four firms, namely Hanoi International Group (HISG - China), Philipp Holzmann (Germany), Bouygues (France), and Lemna-Keystone (United States), participated in the bidding of the stadium's construction. The process was controversial due to violations of technical and financial requirements in HISG and Holzmann's bids, corruption allegations involving a French donation, and the intransparency in the panel's decision making. In the end, HISG won the bid and signed a commitment contract on August 14, 2001.

Construction on the stadium started in 2002. During the development phase, the stadium was referred to as Sân vận động Trung tâm ("central stadium"). The stadium was architecturally complete in June 2003. In August 2003, the stadium was officially named Mỹ Đình National Stadium, taking after the name of the commune area the stadium is located within. It was inaugurated on September 2, 2003, to coincide with Vietnam's National Day.

== Interior ==
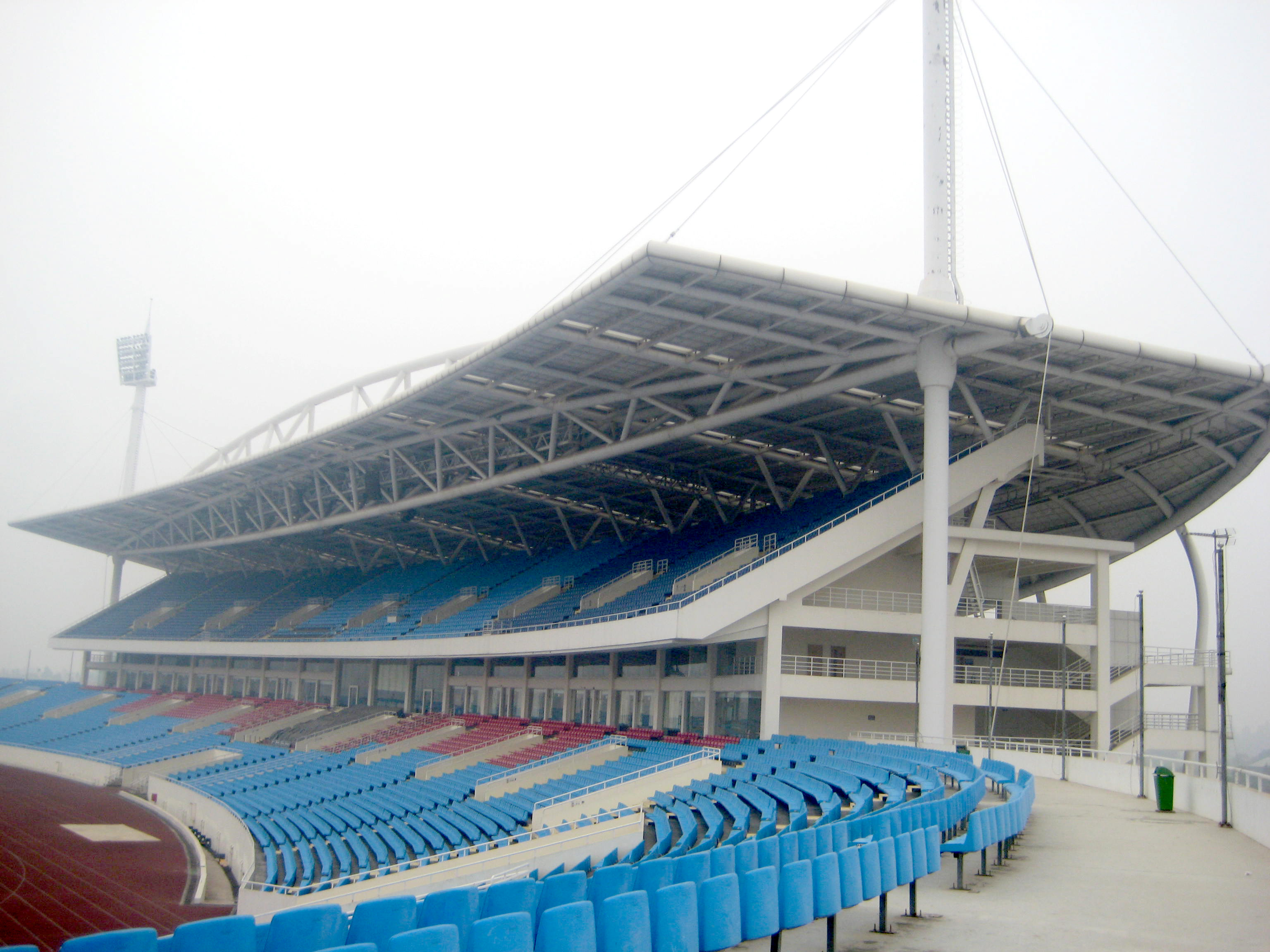
The A stands of Mỹ Đình National Stadium

=== Stands ===
Mỹ Đình has 4 stands. The A & B stands (or east and west stands, respectively) are covered each by an arched roof weighing 2,300 tonnes. These two stands have two tiers and are 25.8 m (85 ft) tall while the C & D stands (or south and north stands) are single-tiered and 8.4 m (28 ft) tall. In total, the stadium has a capacity of 40,192 seats, including 450 VIP seats and 160 seats for journalists.

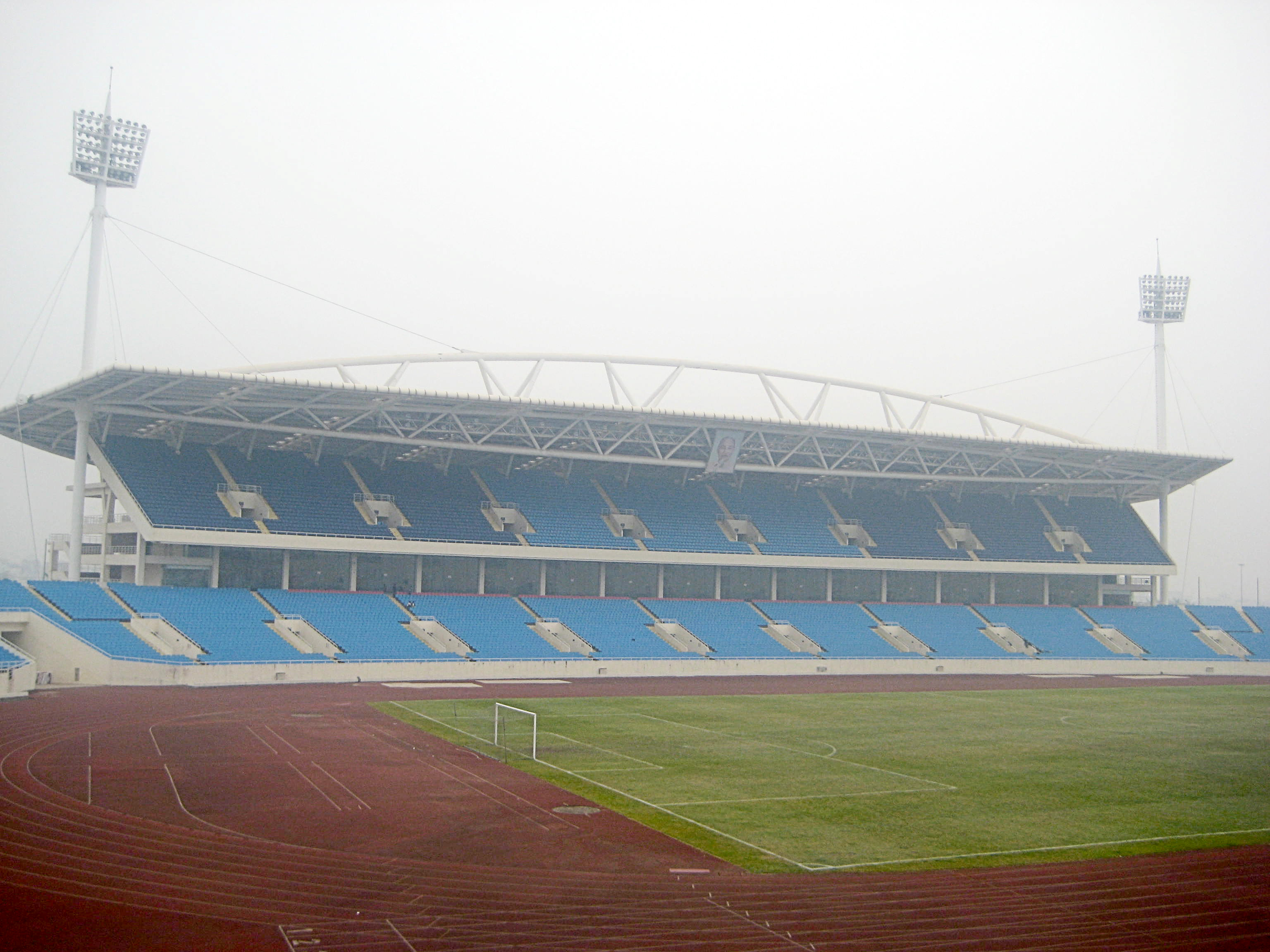
The B stands of Mỹ Đình National Stadium

=== Field ===
The playing grass field has a size of 105m x 67m, surrounded by an 8-lane athletics track and other athletics facilities.

== Events ==
=== Sporting events ===
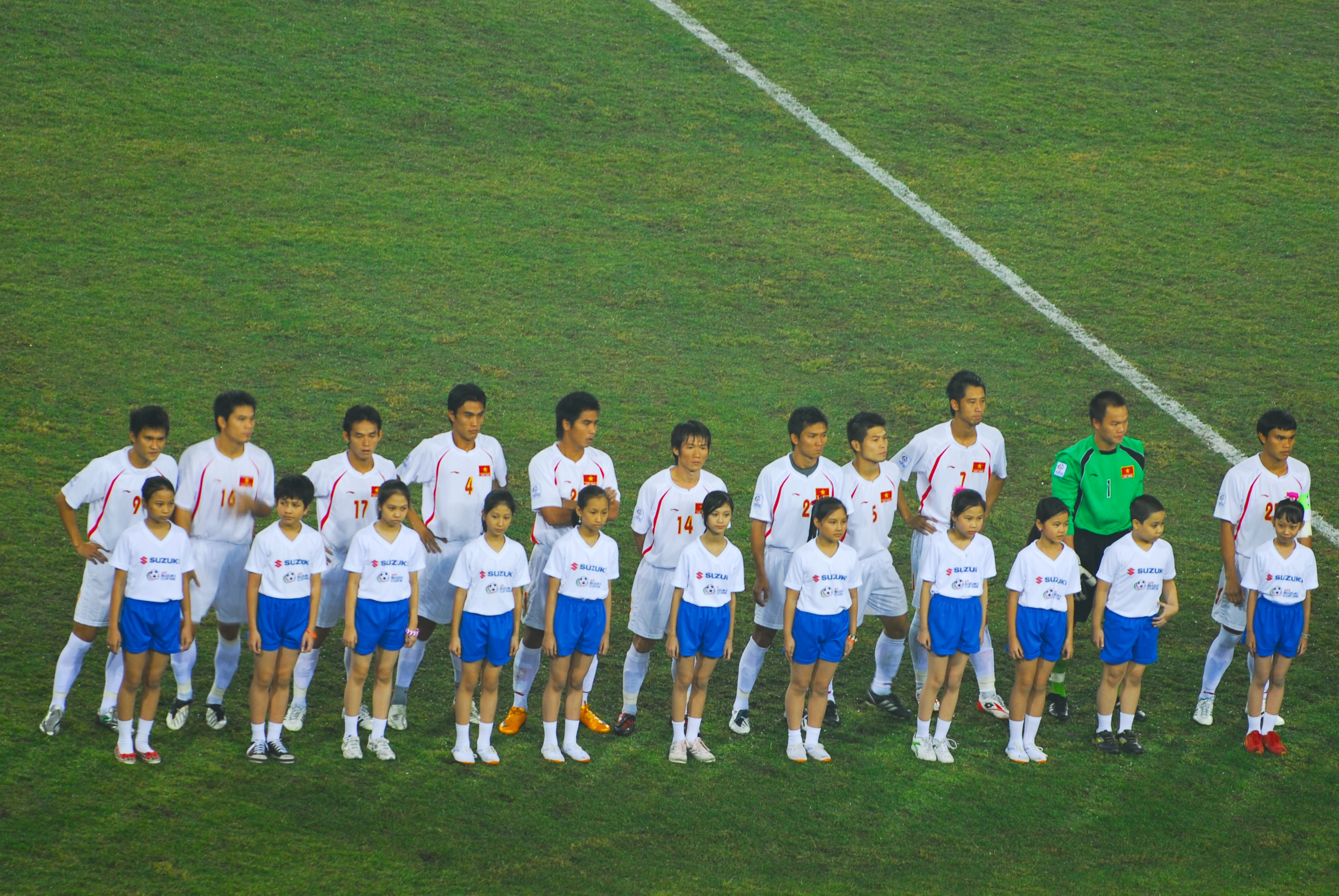
Mỹ Đình National Stadium during the second tier of the AFF Cup 2008 final

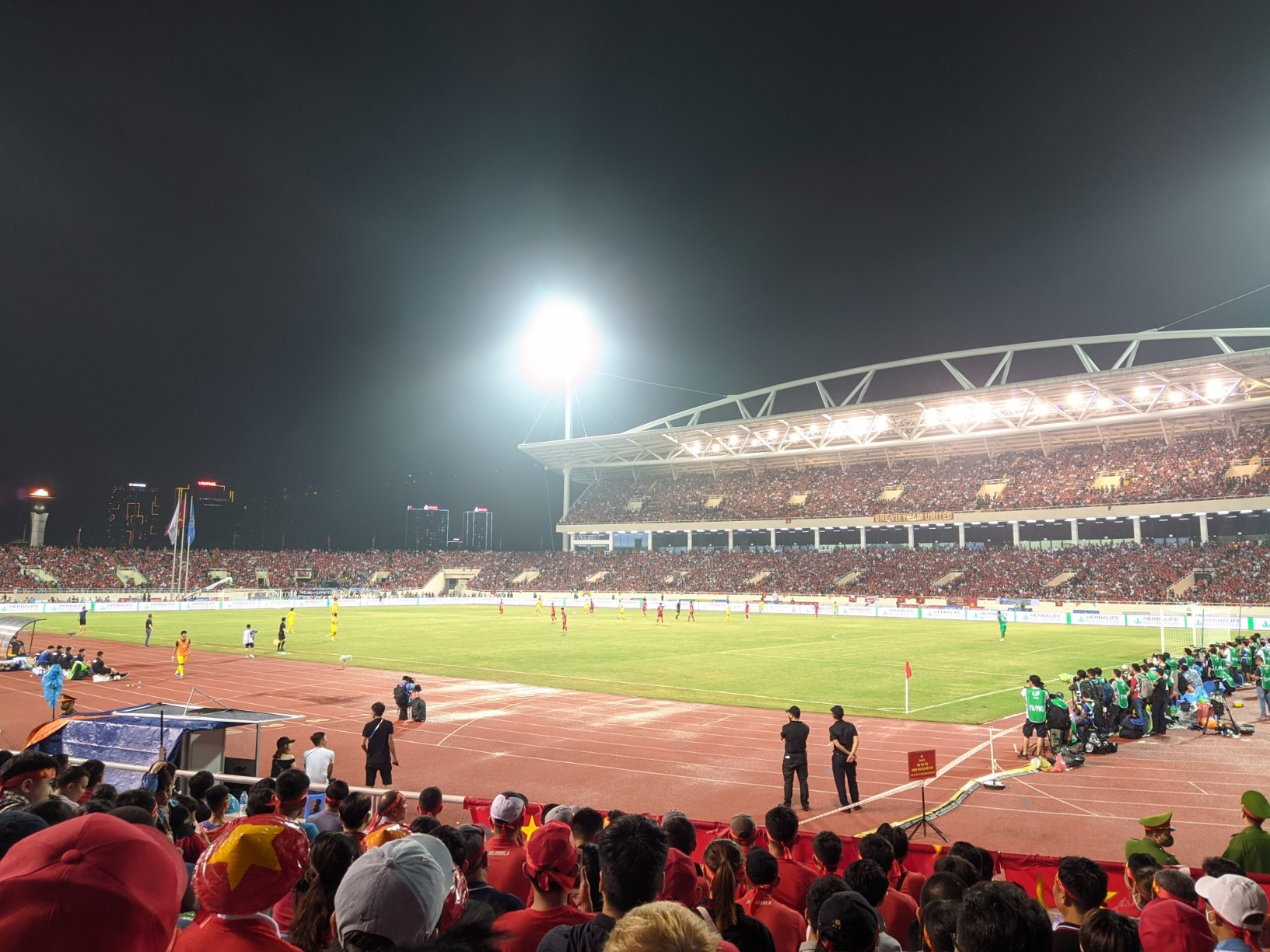
Mỹ Đình National Stadium during the 31st SEA Games Men's Football Final

The stadium officially opened on September 2, 2003, with the opening friendly match between the Vietnam U23 and Shanghai Shenhua from Chinese Super League.

It hosted the 2003 Southeast Asian Games (opening ceremony, football and athletics, closing ceremony), 2003 ASEAN Para Games.

The Hanoi football club was scheduled to play at the stadium, but later backed out of their agreement, citing the embarrassment of using an 40,000+ seat venue for games that routinely draw only slightly more than 5,000.

In July 2007, Mỹ Đình Stadium hosted the Group B of 2007 AFC Asian Cup along with Quân khu 7 Stadium (Ho Chi Minh City), quarter-final match (Japan vs Australia) and semi-final match (Japan vs Saudi Arabia).

Mỹ Đình Stadium held the opening ceremony of the 2009 Asian Indoor Games from October 30, 2009, to November 8.

In December 2010, it held Group B of 2010 AFF Suzuki Cup from December 2 to December 8.

The stadium hosted sections of the 2021 Southeast Asian Games, in particular the opening ceremony, and football and athletics events.

In addition, this stadium held many domestic and international football competitions:

- 2008 AFC Champions League (Nam Định selected this stadium as its own Thiên Trường Stadium did not meet AFC's criteria)
- 2008 The stadium held an international friendly match between Vietnam and Olympic Brazil
- 2010 VFF Cup
- 2011 V-League (25th round match between Hà Nội ACB and Sông Lam Nghệ An)
- 2011 VFF Cup
- 2012 Football at the Summer Olympics – Men's Asian Qualifiers Playoff Round

The three runners-up from the third round groups played each other at a neutral venue on 25, 27 and 29 March 2012. Vietnam was later chosen by the AFC Competitions Committee as the neutral venue, with games played at Hanoi's Mỹ Đình Stadium.

- On 17 July 2013, the stadium held an international friendly match between Vietnam and Arsenal.
- On 27 July 2015, the stadium held an international friendly match between Vietnam and Manchester City.
- On September 7, 2021, the stadium hosted the first match in the 2022 FIFA World Cup qualification – AFC third round between Vietnam and Australia. This is also the first time VAR and Goal-line have been applied in Vietnam (made by Hawk-Eye Innovations Ltd).
- On 30 November 2022, the stadium held an international friendly match between Vietnam and Borussia Dortmund, which saw a shock host win of 2-1 after a controversial second goal in the last minutes of the match.
- 2023–24 AFC Champions League (Hanoi FC selected this stadium as its own Hàng Đẫy Stadium did not meet AFC's criteria).

=== Entertainment events ===
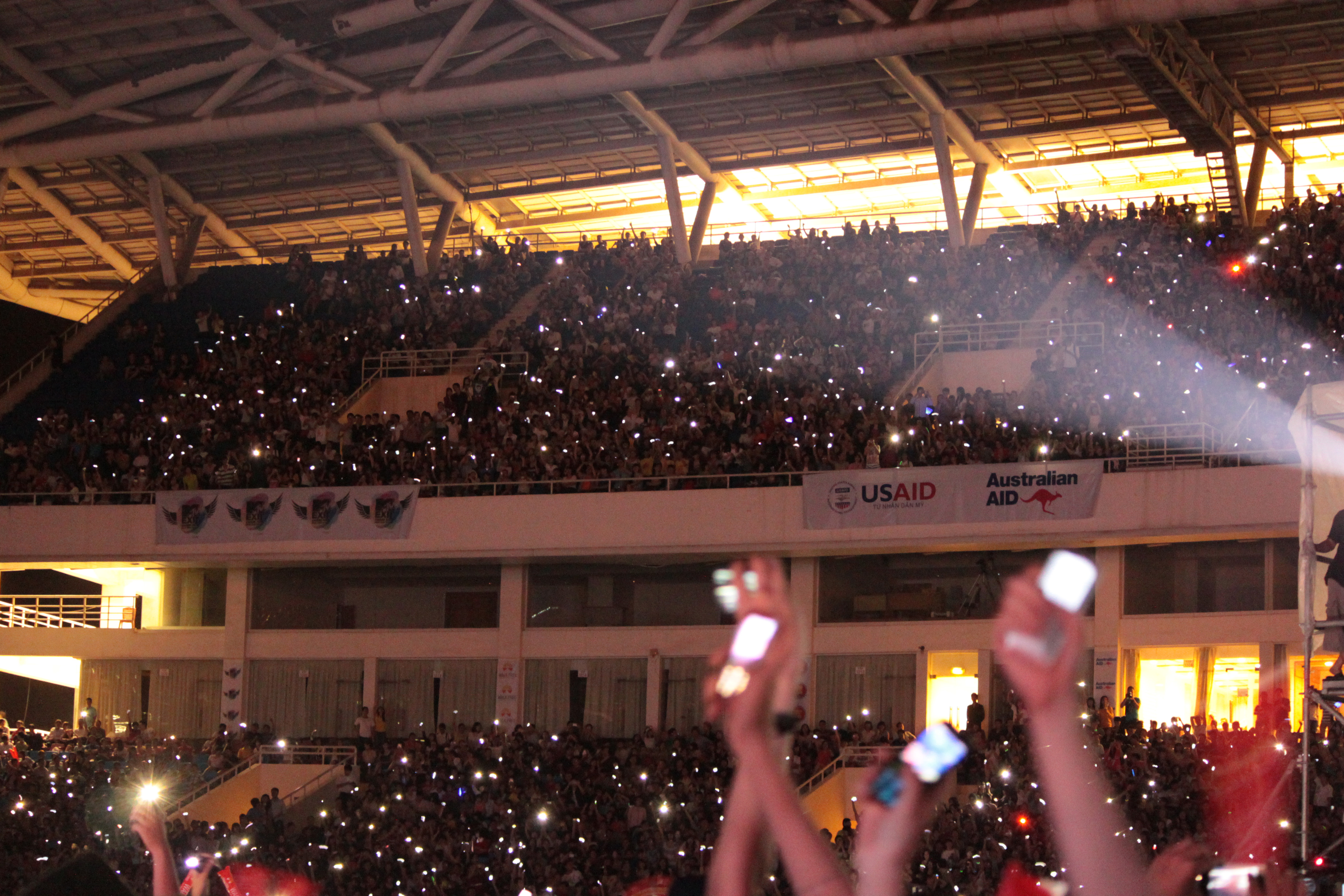
The stadium during an MTV EXIT concert in 2010

Mỹ Đình National Stadium has hosted various entertainment events. On March 27, 2010, an MTV EXIT concert was held here with the appearance of Korean boy band Super Junior, Australian singer Kate Miller-Heidke, along with other local Vietnamese singers. On October 1, 2011, the Irish boyband Westlife performed at the stadium as a part of their Gravity Tour; about 11,000 people attended the concert. The stadium was also the starting location of the 2012 season of The Amazing Race Vietnam. On May 26, 2013, MTV EXIT held a concert featuring the Canadian pop punk band Simple Plan.

The stadium has also been the venue for various K-pop concerts. It was the venue for a special concert of MBC's Music Core on December 8, 2012, KBS's Music Bank World Tour on March 28, 2015, Asia Artist Awards on November 26, 2019, and two Born Pink concerts by girl group Blackpink on July 29 and 30, 2023.

List of entertainment events held at the Mỹ Đình National Stadium
Date	Artist	Event
April 4, 2004	Mỹ Tâm	Liveshow: Ngày ấy và bây giờ (Yesterday & Now)
June 21, 2004	Sarah Brightman	Harem World Tour
March 27, 2010	Performers: Phạm Anh Khoa Phương Vy Lưu Hương Giang Hoàng Hải Hà Anh Tuấn Kate Miller-Heidke Super Junior	MTV EXIT
March 26, 2011	Backstreet Boys	This Is Us Tour
October 1, 2011	Westlife	Gravity Tour
May 26, 2012	Performers: Mỹ Tâm Bức Tường Brown Eyed Girls Kate Miller-Heidke Simple Plan	MTV EXIT
December 29, 2012	Performers: TVXQ Girls' Generation T-ara HyunA Kara B1A4 Infinite Teen Top B.A.P Sistar Miss A Beast Fiestar ChAOS F.T. Island Ailee Son Dam-bi	K-pop Festival 2012 – Concert in Vietnam
March 28, 2015	Performers: EXO Shinee Sistar Apink Teen Top Got7 Block B	Music Bank World Tour
March 25, 2017	Performers: EXID Seventeen Seven Apink NC.A B.I.G Masc HALO Laboum I.C.E Bom-i	MBC Music K-Plus Concert in Vietnam
May 20, 2017	Hardwell, Jewelz & Sparks	Go Hardwell or Go Home
October 26, 2019	Performers: Sơn Tùng M-TP Đen Vâu Bằng Kiều Tóc Tiên Đan Trường Isaac Hồ Ngọc Hà Ưng Hoàng Phúc Đàm Vĩnh Hưng Tuấn Hưng	FWD Music Fest
November 26, 2019	MC: Leeteuk Lim Ji-yeon; Performers: Itzy Loona DKZ Snuper Tomorrow X Together (G)I-DLE AB6IX Stray Kids Kang Daniel Zico Momoland Chungha NU'EST Red Velvet Seventeen Got7 TWICE Super Junior	Asia Artist Awards 2019
January 11, 2020	Performers: Tóc Tiên EXO-SC Taemin (Shinee) NCT 127 Elris AlphaBat A.C.E	2020 K-pop Super Concert in Hanoi
November 5, 2022	Mỹ Tâm	Liveshow: Tri âm
July 29–30, 2023	Blackpink	Born Pink World Tour
June 29, 2024	Performers: Yellow Claw Said the Sky Vinai Lucas & Steve Youna Harmson x MC YoungK Mike Hao Nix x Sammie x MC CongSon Karik Tóc Tiên Hieuthuhai Liu Grace Phương Ly Kent Trần Bùi Lan Hương	Watera Festival 2024 - Chapter 2: The Guardian
December 7 & 9, 2024	Contestants of Anh trai "say hi" season 1	Anh Trai Say Hi Concert Day 3 & 4
May 10, 2025	Contestants of Anh trai "say hi" season 1	Anh Trai Say Hi Concert Day 6
June 21, 2025	Performers: G-Dragon CL DPR Ian Tempest tripleS Quang Hùng MasterD (Special guest)	K-Star Spark in Vietnam by VPBank
August 10, 2025	Performers: Thu Huyền Tùng Dương Noo Phước Thịnh Tóc Tiên Võ Hạ Trâm Thanh Duy Hà Lê Suboi with other artists	National Concert - Tổ Quốc trong tim
October 11, 2025	Contestants of Em xinh "say hi" season 1	Em Xinh Say Hi Concert Day 2
December 13, 2025	Mỹ Tâm	Mỹ Tâm Live Concert: See the Light
March 16, 2026	Contestants of Anh trai "say hi" season 2	Anh Trai Say Hi 2025 Concert Day 2
July 6 & 7, 2026	Performers: Psy Jay Park Dara Park BamBam Kwon Eun-bi Wendy Fromis 9 Baby Dont Cry Lngshot	K-Pulse Hanoi 2026
October 24–25, 2026	BigBang	XX: Cosmos World Tour

== Tournament results ==
The stadium has hosted several international FIFA and AFC matches. Here is a list of the most important international matches held at the stadium.

=== 2003 SEA Games ===
Date	Time (UTC+7)	Team #1	Result	Team #2	Round	Attendance
30 November 2003	15:00	Indonesia	1–0	Laos	Group A	—N/a
30 November 2003	17:30	Thailand	1–1	Vietnam	Group A	40,000
9 December 2003	16:00	Thailand	2–0	Myanmar	Semi-Final	—N/a
9 December 2003	19:00	Vietnam	4–3	Malaysia	Semi-Final	40,000
12 December 2003	16:30	Malaysia	1–1 (4–2 pen)	Myanmar	Bronze medal match	—N/a
12 December 2003	19:00	Thailand	2–1	Vietnam	Gold medal match	40,000

=== 2006 FIFA World Cup Asian Qualifiers – second round ===
Date	Time (UTC+7)	Team #1	Result	Team #2	Round	Attendance
18 February 2004	17:00	Vietnam	4–0	Maldives	Group 7	25,000

=== 2004 AFF Championship ===
Date	Time (UTC+7)	Team #1	Result	Team #2	Round	Attendance
11 December 2004	17:00	Laos	2–1	Cambodia	Group Stage	N/A
11 December 2004	19:30	Vietnam	0–3	Indonesia	Group Stage	N/A
13 December 2004	17:00	Singapore	6–2	Laos	Group Stage	N/A
13 December 2004	19:30	Indonesia	8–0	Cambodia	Group Stage	N/A
15 December 2004	18:00	Vietnam	3–0	Laos	Group Stage	N/A

=== 2007 AFF Championship ===
Date	Time (UTC+7)	Team #1	Result	Team #2	Round	Attendance
24 January 2007	19:00	Vietnam	0–2	Thailand	Semi-Final first leg	40,000

=== 2007 AFC Asian Cup ===
Date	Time (UTC+7)	Team #1	Result	Team #2	Round	Attendance
8 July 2007	19:30	Vietnam	2–0	United Arab Emirates	Group B	39,450
9 July 2007	17:15	Japan	1–1	Qatar	Group B	5,000
12 July 2007	19:30	Qatar	1–1	Vietnam	Group B	40,000
13 July 2007	20:30	United Arab Emirates	1–3	Japan	Group B	5,000
16 July 2007	17:15	Vietnam	1–4	Japan	Group B	40,000
21 July 2007	17:15	Japan	1–1 (4–3 pen)	Australia	Quarter-Final	25,000
25 July 2007	20:15	Japan	2–3	Saudi Arabia	Semi-Final	10,000

=== 2008 AFF Championship ===
Date	Time (UTC+7)	Team #1	Result	Team #2	Round	Attendance
17 December 2008	19:00	Vietnam	0–2	Singapore	Semi-Final first leg	40,000

=== 2008 Summer Olympics qualification (AFC Round 2) ===
Date	Time (UTC+7)	Team #1	Result	Team #2	Round	Attendance
18 April 2007	17:00	Vietnam	2–0	Oman	Group C	20,000
6 June 2007	20:30	Vietnam	2–1	Indonesia	Group C	35,000

=== 2008 Summer Olympics qualification (AFC Round 3) ===
Date	Time (UTC+7)	Team #1	Result	Team #2	Round	Attendance
8 September 2007	19:15	Vietnam	1–1	Qatar	Group C	14,000
12 September 2007	19:15	Vietnam	1–1	Saudi Arabia	Group C	10,000

=== 2010 FIFA World Cup Asian Qualifiers – first round ===
Date	Time (UTC+7)	Team #1	Result	Team #2	Round	Attendance
8 October 2007	20:30	Vietnam	0–1	United Arab Emirates	First leg	20,000

=== 2008 Summer Olympics qualification (AFC Round 3) ===
Date	Time (UTC+7)	Team #1	Result	Team #2	Round	Attendance
17 November 2007	19:15	Vietnam	0–4	Japan	Group C	7,000

=== 2008 AFF Championship ===
Date	Time (UTC+7)	Team #1	Result	Team #2	Round	Attendance
17 December 2008	19:00	Vietnam	0–0	Singapore	Semi-Final first leg	40,000
28 December 2008	19:00	Vietnam	1–1 (3–2)	Thailand	Final second leg	40,000

=== 2011 AFC Asian Cup qualification ===
Date	Time (UTC+7)	Team #1	Result	Team #2	Round	Attendance
14 January 2009	19:00	Vietnam	3–1	Lebanon	Group D	13,000
14 November 2009	19:00	Vietnam	0–1	Syria	Group D	30,000
17 January 2010	19:00	Vietnam	1–2	China	Group D	3,000

=== 2010 AFF Championship ===
Date	Time (UTC+7)	Team #1	Result	Team #2	Round	Attendance
2 December 2010	17:00	Singapore	1–1	Philippines	Group Stage	N/A
2 December 2010	19:30	Vietnam	7–1	Myanmar	Group Stage	35,000
5 December 2010	17:00	Singapore	2–1	Myanmar	Group Stage	N/A
5 December 2010	19:30	Philippines	2–0	Vietnam	Group Stage	37,879
8 December 2010	19:30	Vietnam	1–0	Singapore	Group Stage	40,000
18 December 2010	19:00	Vietnam	0–0 (0–2)	Malaysia	Semi-Final second leg	40,000

=== 2012 Summer Olympics qualification (AFC Round 2) ===
Date	Time (UTC+7)	Team #1	Result	Team #2	Round	Attendance
23 June 2011	19:15	Vietnam	1–4	Saudi Arabia	Round 2	15,000

=== 2014 FIFA World Cup Asian Qualifiers – second round ===
Date	Time (UTC+7)	Team #1	Result	Team #2	Round	Attendance
28 July 2011	19:15	Vietnam	2–1 (2–4)	Qatar	Second leg	20,000

=== 2015 AFC Asian Cup qualification ===
Date	Time (UTC+7)	Team #1	Result	Team #2	Round	Attendance
6 February 2013	18:00	Vietnam	1–2	United Arab Emirates	Group E	7,200
15 November 2013	19:00	Vietnam	0–3	Uzbekistan	Group E	9,000
5 March 2014	21:00	Vietnam	3–1	Hong Kong	Group E	5,800

=== 2014 AFF U-19 Youth Championship ===
Date	Time (UTC+7)	Team #1	Result	Team #2	Round	Attendance
5 September 2014	16:30	Indonesia	2–6	Thailand	Group A	18,350
5 September 2014	19:00	Vietnam	1–0	Australia	Group B	37,879
7 September 2014	16:30	Australia	3–4	Japan	Group B	1,025
7 September 2014	19:00	Thailand	1–2	Myanmar	Group A	1,598
9 September 2014	16:30	Myanmar	3–0	Indonesia	Group A	17,545
9 September 2014	19:00	Japan	3–2	Vietnam	Group B	39,898
11 September 2014	16:30	Japan	2–1	Thailand	Semi-finals	23,989
11 September 2014	19:15	Myanmar	1–4	Vietnam	Semi-finals	44,625
13 September 2014	16:30	Thailand	1–0	Myanmar	Third place play-off	25,589
13 September 2014	19:15	Vietnam	0–1	Japan	Final	50,000

=== 2014 AFF Championship ===
Date	Time (UTC+7)	Team #1	Result	Team #2	Round	Attendance
22 November 2014	16:00	Philippines	4–1	Laos	Group Stage	N/A
22 November 2014	19:00	Vietnam	2–2	Indonesia	Group Stage	N/A
25 November 2014	16:00	Philippines	4–0	Indonesia	Group Stage	N/A
25 November 2014	19:00	Laos	0–3	Vietnam	Group Stage	N/A
28 November 2014	19:00	Vietnam	3–1	Philippines	Group Stage	N/A
11 December 2014	19:00	Vietnam	2–4 (4–5)	Malaysia	Semi-Final second leg	N/A

=== 2018 FIFA World Cup Asian Qualifiers – second round ===
Date	Time (UTC+7)	Team #1	Result	Team #2	Round	Attendance
8 October 2015	19:00	Vietnam	1–1	Iraq	Group F	10,000
13 October 2015	19:00	Vietnam	0–3	Thailand	Group F	35,000
24 March 2016	19:00	Vietnam	4–1	Chinese Taipei	Group F	18,350

=== 2016 AFF Championship ===
Date	Time (UTC+7)	Team #1	Result	Team #2	Round	Attendance
7 December 2016	19:00	Vietnam	2–2 (3–4 a.e.t)	Indonesia	Semi-Final second leg	40,000

=== 2019 AFC Asian Cup qualification – third round ===
Date	Time (UTC+7)	Team #1	Result	Team #2	Round	Attendance
10 October 2017	19:00	Vietnam	5–0	Cambodia	Group C	11,000
14 November 2017	19:00	Vietnam	0–0	Afghanistan	Group C	28,580

=== 2018 AFF Championship ===
Date	Time (UTC+7)	Team #1	Result	Team #2	Round	Attendance
16 November 2018	19:30	Vietnam	2–0	Malaysia	Group Stage	40,000
6 December 2018	19:30	Vietnam	2–1 (4–2)	Philippines	Semi-Final second leg	38,816
15 December 2018	19:30	Vietnam	1–0 (3–2)	Malaysia	Final second leg	44,625

=== 2020 AFC U-23 Championship qualification ===
Date	Time (UTC+7)	Team #1	Result	Team #2	Round	Attendance
22 March 2019	17:00	Thailand	4–0	Indonesia	Group K	1,053
22 March 2019	20:00	Vietnam	6–0	Brunei	Group K	7,689
24 March 2019	17:00	Brunei	0–8	Thailand	Group K	1,178
24 March 2019	20:00	Indonesia	0–1	Vietnam	Group K	25,591
26 March 2019	17:00	Indonesia	2–1	Brunei	Group K	825
26 March 2019	20:00	Vietnam	4–0	Thailand	Group K	38,278

=== 2022 FIFA World Cup Asian Qualifiers ===
Date	Time (UTC+7)	Team #1	Result	Team #2	Round	Attendance
10 October 2019	20:00	Vietnam	1–0	Malaysia	Group G (second round)	38,256
14 November 2019	20:00	Vietnam	1–0	United Arab Emirates	Group G (second round)	37,879
19 November 2019	20:00	Vietnam	0–0	Thailand	Group G (second round)	40,000
7 September 2021	19:00	Vietnam	0–1	Australia	Group B (third round)	0
11 November 2021	19:00	Vietnam	0–1	Japan	Group B (third round)	11,022
16 November 2021	19:00	Vietnam	0–1	Saudi Arabia	Group B (third round)	9,669
1 February 2022	19:00	Vietnam	3–1	China	Group B (third round)	6,099
24 March 2022	19:00	Vietnam	0–1	Oman	Group B (third round)	6,923

=== 2021 SEA Games ===
Date	Time (UTC+7)	Team #1	Result	Team #2	Round	Attendance
22 May 2022	16:00	Malaysia	1–1 (3–4 pen)	Indonesia	Bronze medal match	25,589
22 May 2022	19:00	Vietnam	1–0	Thailand	Gold medal match	39,898

=== 2022 AFF Championship ===
Date	Time (UTC+7)	Team #1	Result	Team #2	Round	Attendance
27 December 2022	19:30	Vietnam	3–0	Malaysia	Group Stage	17,545
3 January 2023	19:30	Vietnam	3–0	Myanmar	Group Stage	11,575
9 January 2023	19:30	Vietnam	2–0 (2–0)	Indonesia	Semi-Final second leg	23,989
13 January 2023	19:30	Vietnam	2–2	Thailand	Final first leg	38,539

=== 2026 FIFA World Cup Asian Qualifiers – second round ===
Date	Time (UTC+7)	Team #1	Result	Team #2	Round	Attendance
21 November 2023	19:00	Vietnam	0–1	Iraq	Group F	20,568
26 March 2024	19:00	Vietnam	0–3	Indonesia	Group F	27,832
6 June 2024	19:00	Vietnam	3–2	Philippines	Group F	11,568

=== 2026 ASEAN Championship ===
Date	Time (UTC+7)	Team #1	Result	Team #2	Round	Attendance
31 July 2026	20:00	Vietnam	0–0	Singapore	Group Stage	31,569
7 August 2026	20:00	Vietnam	3–1	Cambodia	Group Stage	19,628
19 August 2026	20:00	Vietnam	2–0 (4–0)	Malaysia	Semi-Final second leg	37,906
26 August 2026	20:00	Vietnam	2–2 (4–2)	Thailand	Final second leg	38,646

== Entertainment events ==
List of entertainment events held at the Mỹ Đình National Stadium
Date	Artists	Events	Attendance	Revenue
4 April 2004	Mỹ Tâm	Liveshow: Ngày ấy và bây giờ	—	—
21 June 2004	Sarah Brightman	Harem World Tour	—	—
27 March 2010	Performers: Phạm Anh Khoa Phương Vy Lưu Hương Giang Hoàng Hải Hà Anh Tuấn Kate Miller-Heidke Super Junior	MTV EXIT	—	—
26 March 2011	Backstreet Boys	This Is Us Tour	—	—
1 October 2011	Westlife	Gravity Tour	—	—
26 May 2012	Performers: Mỹ Tâm Bức Tường Brown Eyed Girls Kate Miller-Heidke Simple Plan	MTV EXIT	—	—
29 November 2012	Performers: TVXQ Girls' Generation T-ara Hyuna Kara B1A4 Infinite Teen Top B.A.P Sistar Miss A Beast Fiestar ChAOS F.T. Island Ailee Son Dam-bi	K-pop Festival 2012 – Concert in Vietnam	50,000 / 50,000	—
28 March 2015	Performers: Exo Shinee Sistar Apink Teen Top Got7 Block B	Music Bank World Tour	—	—
25 March 2017	Performers: EXID Seventeen Seven Apink NC.A B.I.G Masc HALO Laboum I.C.E Bom-i	MBC Music K-Plus Concert in Vietnam	—	—
20 May 2017	Hardwell; Jewelz & Sparks	Go Hardwell or Go Home	20,000 / 20,000	—
26 October 2019	Performers: Sơn Tùng M-TP Đen Vâu Bằng Kiều Tóc Tiên Đan Trường Isaac Hồ Ngọc Hà Ưng Hoàng Phúc Đàm Vĩnh Hưng Tuấn Hưng	FWD Music Fest	30,000 / 30,000	—
26 November 2019	Host: Leeteuk Lim Ji-yeon; Performers: Itzy Loona DKZ Snuper Tomorrow X Together (G)I-DLE AB6IX Stray Kids Kang Daniel Zico Momoland Chungha NU'EST Red Velvet Seventeen Got7 TWICE Super Junior Bích Phương	Asia Artist Awards 2019	—	—
11 January 2020	Performers: Tóc Tiên (opening) Exo-SC Taemin (Shinee) NCT 127 Elris AlphaBat A.C.E	2020 K-pop Super Concert in Hanoi	—	—
5 November 2022	Mỹ Tâm	Liveshow: Tri âm	30,000 / 30,000	—
29–30 July 2023	BLACKPINK	Born Pink World Tour	67,443 / 67,443	$13,660,064
29 June 2024	Performers: Yellow Claw Said the Sky Vinai Lucas & Steve Youna Harmson x Mc YoungK Mike Hao Nix x Sammie x Mc CongSon Karik Tóc Tiên Hieuthuhai Liu Grace Phương Ly Kent Tran Bùi Lan Hương	Watera Festival 2024 - Chapter 2: The Guardian	—	—
7 & 9 December 2024	Anh Trai "Say Hi" Artists	Anh Trai Say Hi Concert 2024 (Day 3 & 4)	90,000 / 90,000	—
10 May 2025	Anh Trai "Say Hi" Artists	Anh Trai Say Hi Concert Day 6	30,000 / 30,000	—
21 June 2025	Performers: G-Dragon CL DPR Ian Tempest tripleS Quang Hùng MasterD (Special guest)	K-Star Spark in Vietnam 2025	40,000 / 40,000	—
10 August 2025	Performers: Thu Huyền Tùng Dương Noo Phước Thịnh Tóc Tiên Võ Hạ Trâm Thanh Duy Hà Lê Suboi (and other artists)	National Concert - Homeland in Our Hearts	—	N/A
11 October 2025	Em Xinh "Say Hi" Artists	Em Xinh Say Hi Concert Day 2		
13 December 2025	Mỹ Tâm	Mỹ Tâm Live Concert: See the Light		
16 March 2026	Anh Trai Say Hi (Season 2) Artists	Anh Trai Say Hi 2025 Concert Day 2		
6-7 June 2026	Performers: Psy Jay Park Dara Park BamBam Kwon Eun-bi Wendy Fromis 9 Baby Dont Cry Lngshot	K-Pulse Hanoi 2026		
24–25 October 2026	BigBang	XX: Cosmos World Tour		
8 November 2026	BigBang	XX: Cosmos World Tour	Performers: Psy Jay Park Dara Park BamBam Kwon Eun-bi Wendy Fromis 9 Baby Dont Cry Lngshot	Liên Quân 10 Fest (Arena of Valor)

== Controversies ==
=== 2010 fireworks explosion ===
At approximately 11:40 local time on October 6, 2010, an explosion occurred at the stadium. The cause was confirmed to be the ignition of two firework containers due to negligence in the installation of their detonation position; this was a rehearsal for a programme commemorating the millennial anniversary of the establishment of Thăng Long (present-day Hanoi), which was scheduled to be held on October 10. The explosion killed four people and injured three.

=== Deteriorating pitch quality and equipment ===
==== 2021 and SEA Games 31 ====
Since the second half of 2021, criticism had been raised regarding the quality of the pitch and facilities at the stadium. In September 2021, the Vietnamese national team hosted Australia in the third round of the 2022 FIFA World Cup qualifiers; Australian media and fans at the time compared the Mỹ Đình pitch to a "cow pasture". According to the Lao Động newspaper, the stadium's turf had not been renovated for nearly a decade. In addition, some areas of the stadium had fallen into disrepair due to lack of maintenance. At the request of the Asian Football Confederation (AFC), the stadium was renovated by the Vietnamese Ministry of Culture, Sports and Tourism ahead of hosting the 2022 FIFA World Cup qualifiers and the 2021 Southeast Asian Games. Ahead of the 2021 SEA Games, the Vietnamese government granted more than ₫400 million to the Ministry of Culture, Sports and Tourism to repair the stadium alongside the wider National Sports Complex. However, the replacement of the turf was not carried out. Up until the third-place match and the final of the men's football event at the 2021 SEA Games, the turf had been damaged due to the installation of the stage for the opening ceremony.

==== Vietnam–Borussia Dortmund friendly match incident ====
On November 30, 2022, in a friendly match between Vietnam and Borussia Dortmund, in the 86th minute of the match, the crossbar of the Dortmund goal was knocked out, causing the match to be interrupted for 5 minutes. In addition, during the half-time break, the technical area of the two teams and the referee's area were blown over many times by the wind.

==== 2022 AFF Cup ====
Criticism of the stadium's condition continued throughout 2022 and 2023. Ahead of the 2022 AFF Cup, the Vietnam Football Federation (VFF) signed a contract with the National Sports Complex to rent Mỹ Đình as the home stadium of the Vietnamese national team. The rental fee for each match of the Vietnamese national team is ₫800 million ($34,400), the highest in the venue's history. However, the stadium's turf was described as old, faded, and poor, while not all of its seats had been replaced since their initial installation in 2003. According to the Hanoi Tax Department, the National Sports Complex owed ₫855 billion ($35.91 million) in taxes as of 2023.

According to the Director General of the General Department of Physical Education and Sports, Đặng Hà Việt, maintenance and care work had been carried out regularly in the past month, but the city's weather conditions had made the stadium's pitch not as green as expected. Moreover, the AFC had assessed that the Mỹ Đình pitch is still in good condition for competition. However, the claim that the pitch's deterioration was due to weather conditions was considered baseless, as the pitch was described to be of good quality when the Vietnamese national team hosted China in the third round of the 2022 FIFA World Cup qualifiers in early 2023.

On January 4, 2023, Prime Minister Phạm Minh Chính commented on the condition of the stadium, questioning the claim that it was not being exploited. In an effort to address the deteriorating condition ahead of the Vietnam–Indonesia match on January 9, the Vietnamese Minister of Culture, Sports and Tourism Nguyễn Văn Hùng on January 6 requested the Rector of Bắc Ninh University of Physical Education to organize a volunteer activity in which its students would clean up the stadium.

=== Transfer of management and renovation ===
In May 2026, the government of Vietnam approved the transfer of management of the sport complex, including the stadium, from the Ministry of Culture, Sports, and Tourism to the Ministry of National Defence. The decision to transfer management is intended to address financial and long-term operating issues and improve the stadium's infrastructure.

In preparation for the 2026 ASEAN Championship, the government invested roughly 10 billion VND ($380,417 USD) to renovate the stadium. The renovation includes new drainage systems, complete reconstruction of the pitch with Zeon Zoysia grass, along with additional repairs and upgrades to the stadium. This grass variety is also used at Old Trafford, marking the first complete pitch replacement since the stadium opened in 2003. Vietnam hosted its first home game in almost 2 years at My Dinh on July 31, drawing 0-0 with Singapore. Despite the match result, many fans were excited and happy to see such renovation for the national stadium.

== See also ==
- List of football stadiums in Vietnam
- Lists of stadiums
