= Kenja Turaev =

Uzbekistani footballer

Personal information
- Full name: Kenja Turaev
- Date of birth: 1 March 1989 (age 37)
- Place of birth: Qarshi, Uzbekistan
- Position: Striker

Team information
- Current team: Nasaf Qarshi
- Number: 10

Youth career
- Nasaf Qarshi

Senior career*
Years	Team	Apps	(Gls)
2008–	Nasaf Qarshi	22	(3)

International career
	Uzbekistan U23	2	(1)
2008–	Uzbekistan	4	(0)
- * Club domestic league appearances and goals

Kenja Turaev (born 1 March 1989) is an Uzbekistani footballer who plays for home town club Nasaf Qarshi which is playing in Uzbek League as a striker.

He was called up in the Uzbekistan national U23 team at the 2012 Olympics Football Tournament qualifiers, and he scored 1 goal.
