= Football at the 2012 Summer Olympics – Men's qualification (AFC–CAF play-off) =

2012 Men's Olympic Football Tournament qualification (AFC–CAF play-off)
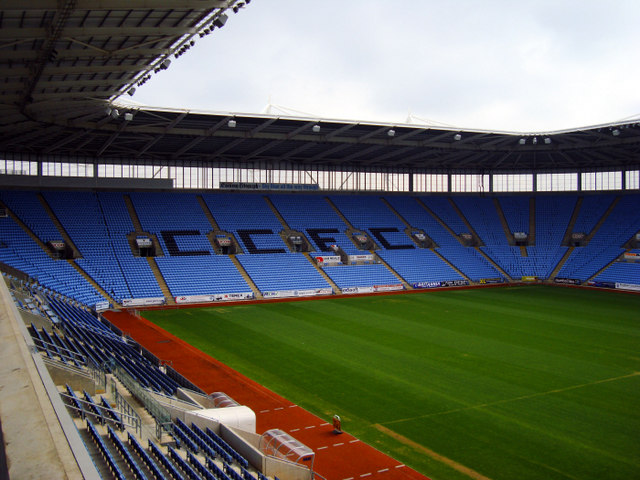
- The City of Coventry Stadium in Coventry hosted the play-off.
- Event: Football at the 2012 Summer Olympics – Men's qualification
Oman	Senegal
(Oman)	(Senegal)
0	2
- Date: 23 April 2012
- Venue: City of Coventry Stadium, Coventry
- Referee: Howard Webb (England)
- Attendance: 11,611

The AFC–CAF football play-off for the 2012 Summer Olympics was a football match between the fourth placed team from the Asian Football Confederation (AFC) and the fourth placed team from the Confederation of African Football (CAF). The match took place at the City of Coventry Stadium in the United Kingdom on 23 April 2012.

== Match ==
23 April 2012
19:45 UTC+1

Oman	0–2	Senegal
	Report	Baldé 2'; Sané 87'

City of Coventry Stadium, Coventry
Attendance: 11,611
Referee: Howard Webb (England)

Senegal qualify for the 2012 Summer Olympics' final tournament.

Oman	Senegal

GK	1	Omer Al-Abri
DF	2	Mohammad Al-Musalami
DF	5	Nasser Al-Shamli
DF	8	Ali Salim Al-Nahar	(yellow card) 58'	(substituted off) 65'
DF	13	Azan Al-Balushi		(substituted off) 77'
MF	4	Ali Al-Jabri
MF	10	Hussain Al-Hadhri (c)
MF	14	Salim Khalfan Al-Maashri
MF	15	Khalil Abdullah Al-Alawi
MF	17	Raed Ibrahim Saleh
FW	9	Abdulaziz Al-Muqbali	(yellow card) 25'
Substitutions:
	16	Hamood Al Saadi		(substituted in) 59'
	12	Badar Bamasila		(substituted in) 65'
	6	Qasim Hardan		(substituted in) 77'
Coach:
(France) Paul Le Guen

GK	1	Ousmane Mané
DF	3	Victor Demba Bindia
DF	4	Abdoulaye Ba (c)
DF	9	Kara Mbodj	(yellow card) 22'
DF	13	Pape Ndiaye Souare	(yellow card) 6'	(substituted off) 77'
MF	15	Ibrahima Seck	(yellow card) 77'
MF	17	Stéphane Badji	(yellow card) 82'
FW	6	Kalidou Yéro
FW	8	Sadio Mané		(substituted off) 90+2'
FW	10	Pape Moussa Konaté		(substituted off) 85'
FW	11	Ibrahima Baldé
Substitutions:
MF	18	Souleymane Cissé		(substituted in) 77'
FW	7	Abdoulaye Sané		(substituted in) 85'
MF	2	Pape Maly Diamanka		(substituted in) 90+2'
Coach:
Aliou Cissé

== Goalscorers ==
There were 2 goals scored in 1 match, for an average of 2 goals per match.

1 goal

- (Senegal) Ibrahima Baldé
- (Senegal) Abdoulaye Sané

== See also ==
- Football at the 2012 Summer Olympics
- Football at the 2012 Summer Olympics – Men's Asian Qualifiers
- 2011 CAF U-23 Championship
