= Fahad Khalfan (Emirati footballer) =

Emirati footballer (born 1990)

Personal information
- Full name: Fahad Khalfan Ali Al-Mesmari
- Date of birth: 21 August 1990 (age 36)
- Place of birth: United Arab Emirates
- Height: 1.77 m (5 ft 9 1/2 in)
- Position: Midfielder

Youth career
- 2005–2008: Al-Wahda
- 2008–2010: Al-Fujairah

Senior career*
Years	Team	Apps	(Gls)
2010–2013	Fujairah		
2013–2017	Al-Shabab	6	(0)
2016	→ Fujairah (loan)	11	(0)
2017–2018	Dibba Al-Fujairah	12	(0)
2018–2019	Emirates	21	(0)
2019–2020	Dibba Al-Fujairah		
2020–2021	Al Bataeh		
2021–2022	Al-Taawon		
2022–2024	Fujairah		
2024	Al-Hamriyah		
- * Club domestic league appearances and goals

Fahad Khalfan (Arabic:فهد خلفان; born 21 August 1990) is an Emirati footballer who plays as a midfielder.
