= Fahad Khalfan (Qatari footballer) =

Qatari footballer (born 1992)

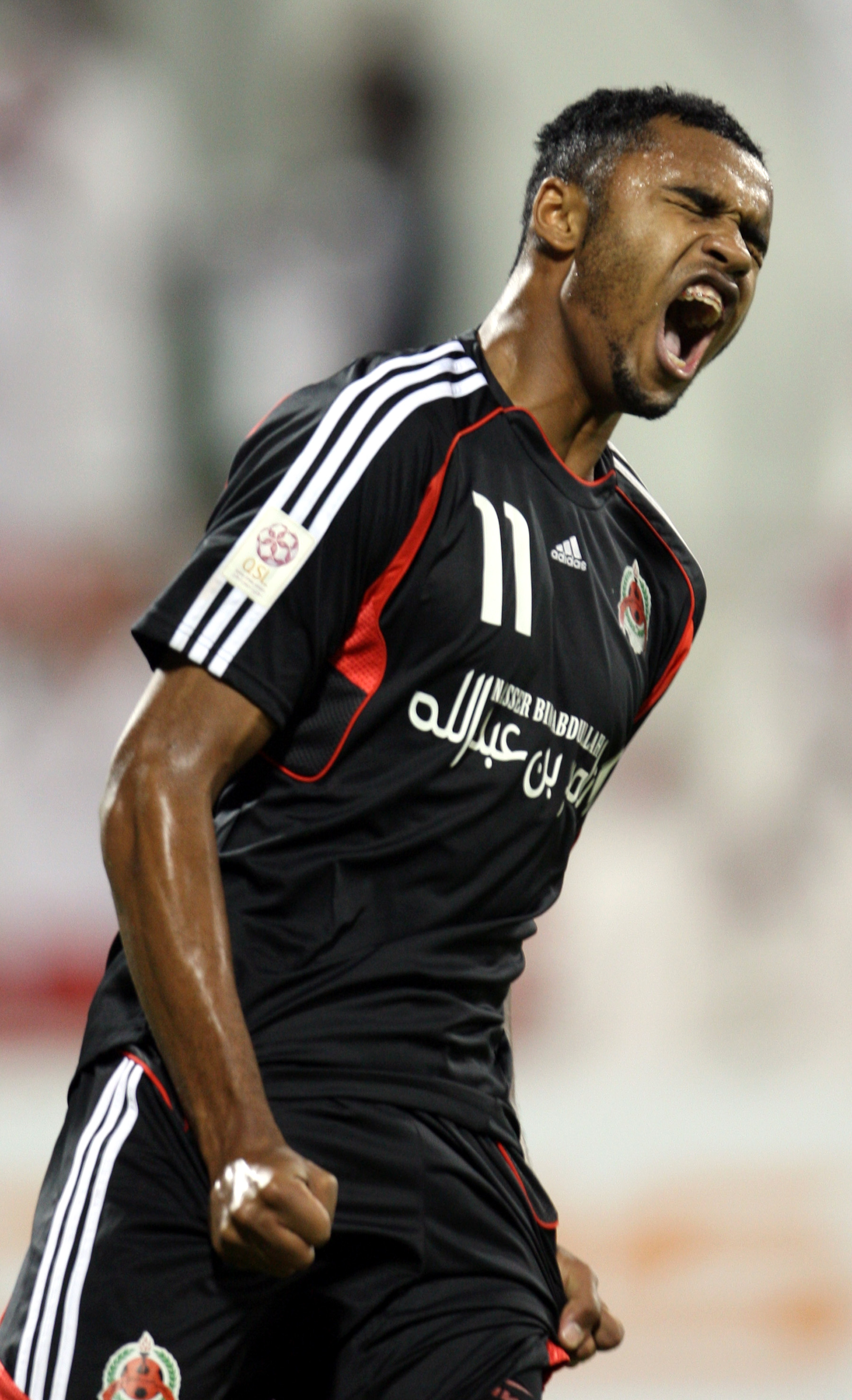
- Khalfan with Al Rayyan in 2011

Personal information
- Full name: Fahad Khalfan Noubi Al Bloushi
- Date of birth: 23 March 1992 (age 34)
- Place of birth: Qatar
- Height: 1.82 m (5 ft 11 1/2 in)
- Positions: Forward; center-forward

Youth career
- ASPIRE Sports Academy

Senior career*
Years	Team	Apps	(Gls)
2009–2017	Al-Rayyan	29	(6)
2012–2013	→ Al-Sailiya (loan)	9	(1)
2015	→ Al-Shahania (loan)	10	(4)
2016–2017	→ Al-Shahania (loan)	26	(7)
2017–2018	Qatar	12	(0)
2018–2022	Al Arabi	26	(3)
2020	→ Umm Salal (loan)	10	(1)
2021-2022	→ Al-Sailiya (loan)	14	(0)
2022–2023	Al-Ahli	13	(0)
2023–2024	Al-Kharaitiyat	8	(1)
2024–2025	Mesaimeer	3	(0)
2025	Al Bidda	3	(0)

International career^{‡}
2010–	Qatar	2	(0)
- * Club domestic league appearances and goals as of 9 April 2012 ‡ National team caps and goals as of 15 November 2010

Fahad Khalfan Al Bloushi (born 23 March 1992) is a Qatari footballer who plays is a striker. He has also played former the Qatar national team.

== Career ==
=== Club career ===
Khalfan played for the youth teams of Al-Rayyan. He achieved recognition by the national team coach, Bruno Metsu, for scoring decisive goals in the Sheikh Jassem Cup in 2010.

Primarily featuring for the team, he scored 11 goals in 18 appearances in 2010–11 season of the reserve league, and 8 goals in 8 appearances in 2011–12. In the 2011–12 season of the Qatar Stars League, he came on as a substitute for Daniel Goumou in the 86th minute and scored a two-minute brace against Qatar SC in stoppage time.

=== International career ===
Khalfan received a call-up to the Qatar national team after his outstanding performances for Al-Rayyan in pre-season. Khalfan made his debut for the national team in a friendly game against Bahrain on September 3, 2010, at the age of 18. He was the first ASPIRE graduate to play for the senior football team of Qatar.

He became renowned for one of the greatest blunders in competitive football on November 15, 2010. In a match against Uzbekistan in the 2010 Asian Games, with the game tied 0-0, Khalfan intercepted a pass to the opposing goalkeeper in the first minute of extra time and then dribbled to a position where he was a yard from the open goal. Instead of tapping the ball into the empty net with his right foot, he tried to shoot powerfully with the outside of his left foot. This caused the ball to collide with the post and miss. Qatar subsequently lost the match in extra time, 0–1, and was eliminated in the quarter-final stage of the 2010 Asian Games.
