= Oman national under-23 football team =

Oman U-23 عمان الأولمبي
- Nickname(s): Al-Ahmar (The Reds)
- Association: Oman Football Association
- Confederation: AFC (Asia)
- Sub-confederation: WAFF (West Asia)
- Head coach: Akram Habrish
- Captain: Nadhir Awadh Bashir
- Home stadium: Sultan Qaboos Sports Complex, Muscat, Oman
First colours	Second colours

First international
- Bahrain 2–0 Oman (Riyadh, Saudi Arabia; 16 April 1987)

Biggest win
- Cambodia 0–9 Oman (Muscat, Oman; 9 April 2003)

Biggest defeat
- Iraq 4–0 Oman (Amman, Jordan; 3 March 2004)

AFC U-23 Championship
- Appearances: 2 (first in 2013)
- Best result: Group stage (2013, 2018)

Asian Games
- Appearances: 4 (first in 2002)
- Best result: Quarter-final (2010)

The Oman national under-23 football team (also known as Oman Olympic, Oman U-23) represents Oman in international football competitions in the Olympic Games. The selection is limited to players under the age of 23 but the final tournament at the Olympics allows for the addition of up to three players older than 23 years. The team is governed by the Oman Football Association.

Oman nearly made its first appearance in football at the Summer Olympics after earning an inter-confederation play-off match with Senegal for a chance qualify for the 2012 Olympics but a 0-2 loss eliminated them from the contention.

== Players ==
=== Current squad ===
The following players were called up for the 2023 WAFF U-23 Championship between 12 and 20 June 2023.

Caps and goals correct as of 28 March 2023, after the match against Iraq.

No.	Pos.	Player	Date of birth (age)	Caps	Goals	Club
1	GK	Mutie Al-Saadi		0	0	(Oman Football Association) Al-Suwaiq
22	GK	Mazen Saleh	28 January 2003 (age 23)	0	0	(Oman Football Association) Muscat
2	DF	Ayman Al-Nabhani	27 July 2003 (age 23)	2	0	(Oman Football Association) Al-Hamra
3	DF	Mohammed Al-Hatmi	27 October 2001 (age 25)	0	0	(Oman Football Association) Al-Seeb
4	DF	Abdullah Al-Mukhaini		1	0	(Oman Football Association) Al-Orouba
13	DF	Abdullah Al-Fleti		2	0	(Oman Football Association) Al-Shabab
20	DF	Majeed Al-Balushi		0	0	(Oman Football Association) Oman
6	MF	Saeed Al-Salami		1	0	(Oman Football Association) Muscat
7	MF	Nasser Al-Rawahi	26 June 2001 (age 25)	2	0	(Oman Football Association) Al-Suwaiq
8	MF	Mohammed Beit Subei	9 November 2004 (age 22)	1	0	(Oman Football Association) Al-Nasr
18	MF	Mohammed Al-Hinai		1		(Oman Football Association) Al-Nahda
19	MF	Abdullah Al-Habsi	25 February 2001 (age 25)	0	0	(Oman Football Association) Al-Seeb
21	MF	Abdul Hafez Al-Mukhaini		2	0	(Oman Football Association) Al-Orouba
9	FW	Nibras Al-Maashari	1 May 2002 (age 24)	1	0	(Oman Football Association) Muscat
10	FW	Asad Al-Balushi		1	0	(Oman Football Association) Ahli Sidab
11	FW	Omar Al-Salti	17 February 2002 (age 24)	1	0	(Oman Football Association) Al-Orouba
14	FW	Salem Al-Abdulsalam		2	0	(Oman Football Association) Dhofar
17	FW	Yusuf Al-Ghaliani		2	0	(Oman Football Association) Al-Orouba

=== Previous squads ===
Asian Games

- Football at the 2006 Asian Games squads – Oman
- Football at the 2010 Asian Games squads – Oman
- Football at the 2014 Asian Games squads – Oman

AFC U-23 Championship

- 2013 AFC U-22 Championship squads – Oman
- 2018 AFC U-23 Championship squads – Oman

== Personnel ==
=== Current technical staff ===
Position	Name
Head coach	(Oman) Akram Habrish
Assistant coach	(Oman) Said Al Raqadi (Oman) Mohammed Al-Araimi
Goalkeeping coach	(Oman) Haroon Al-Bartamani
Fitness coach	(Oman) Arif Al-Mukhaini (Oman) Juma Al-Saifi
Performance analyst	(Oman) Hassan Al-Gharif
Performance analyst	(Oman) Marwan Al-Rushaidi
Team Manager	(Oman) Salah Al-Araimi
Players Relations Manager	(Oman) Ahmed Hadid Al-Mukhaini
Task Manager	(Oman) Ahmed Al-Owaisi
Operations Manager	(Oman) Kamil Al-Balushi
Team Doctor	(Oman) Dr. Mohammed Moulou
Physiotherapist	(Oman) Said Al-Balushi
Physiotherapist	(Oman) Yaqoob Al-Mahrouqi
Masseur	(Oman) Farooq Al-Alawi
Masseur	(Oman) Ali Al-Haddad

== Competitive Record ==
=== Asian Games ===
Asian Games Record
Hosts / Year	Result	Position	GP	W	D	L	GS	GA
(South Korea) 2002	Round 1	9	3	2	0	1	8	5
(Qatar) 2006	Round 1	16	3	1	0	2	4	5
(China) 2010	Quarter-finals	8	5	3	1	1	9	2
(South Korea) 2014	Group stage	25	3	0	1	2	3	6
Total	4/4	-	14	6	2	6	24	18

=== Olympic Games ===
Host nation / Year	Result	GP	W	D*	L	GS	GA
(Greece) 1896	No football tournament was held
(France) 1900	Did not enter
(United States) 1904	Did not enter
(United Kingdom) 1908	Did not enter
(Sweden) 1912	Did not enter
(Belgium) 1920	Did not enter
(France) 1924	Did not enter
(Netherlands) 1928	Did not enter
(United States) 1932	No football tournament was held
(Nazi Germany) 1936	Did not enter
(United Kingdom) 1948	Did not enter
(Finland) 1952	Did not enter
(Australia) 1956	Did not enter
(Italy) 1960	Did not enter
(Japan) 1964	Did not enter
(Mexico) 1968	Did not enter
(West Germany) 1972	Did not enter
(Canada) 1976	Did not enter
(Soviet Union) 1980	Did not enter
(United States) 1984	Did not enter
(South Korea) 1988	Did not qualify
(Spain) 1992	Did not qualify
(United States) 1996	Did not qualify
(Australia) 2000	Did not qualify
(Greece) 2004	Did not qualify
(China) 2008	Did not qualify
(United Kingdom) 2012	Did not qualify
(Brazil) 2016	Did not qualify
Total	0/25	0	0	0	0	0	0

*Denotes draws including knockout matches decided on penalty kicks.

=== AFC U-23 Championship record ===
Year	Result	Pos	P	W	D	L	F	A
(Oman) 2013	Group stage	11/16	3	1	0	2	4	3
(Qatar) 2016	Did not qualify	-	-	-	-	-	-	-
(China) 2018	Group stage	15/16	3	0	0	3	0	5
(Thailand) 2020	Did not qualify	-	-	-	-	-	-	-
(Uzbekistan) 2022	Did not qualify	-	-	-	-	-	-	-
(Qatar) 2024	Did not qualify	-	-	-	-	-	-	-
(Saudi Arabia) 2026	Did not qualify	-	-	-	-	-	-	-
(Japan) 2028	To be determined							
Total	Group stage	6	1	0	5	4	8	-4

== See also ==
- Oman national football team
- Oman national under-20 football team
- Oman national under-17 football team
