= 2008 AFC U-19 Championship qualification =

Tournament details
- Teams: 34 (from 1 confederation)

The qualification competition for the 2008 AFC U-19 Championship took place from 17 October 2007 to 28 November 2007. Saudi Arabia qualified automatically as hosts.

== Teams that did not enter ==
- Brunei
- Cambodia
- Philippines

== Group A ==
Team	Pld	W	D	L	GF	GA	GD	Pts
United Arab Emirates	4	3	0	1	9	3	+6	9
Iraq	4	2	0	2	3	4	−1	6
Kuwait	4	1	0	3	3	8	−5	3
Sri Lanka (W)	0	-	-	-	-	-	—	0
Bangladesh (W)	0	-	-	-	-	-	—	0
Mongolia (W)	0	-	-	-	-	-	—	0

(W) Withdrew

All matches played home & away

17 October 2007	Iraq	1–0	Kuwait	Damascus, Syria
14:00 EEST	Mohammed M. 19'	(Report)		Stadium: Al-Faiha Stadium; Attendance: 1000; Referee: Jasim Karim (Bahrain)

24 October 2007	Kuwait	1–5	United Arab Emirates	Al-Salmiya, Kuwait
17:30 AST	M. Al-Shammari 2'	(Report)	A. Khalil 10', 51', 90+2'; T. Awana 22'; H. Ismaeel 66' (pen.)	Stadium: Thamir Stadium; Attendance: 300; Referee: Mahmood Mohd Juma al-Ghatrifi (Oman)

31 October 2007	United Arab Emirates	2–1	Iraq	Dubai, UAE
18:15 UAET	H. Ismaeel 75'; A. Ali 86'	(Report)	Qais 85'	Stadium: Al−Shabab Stadium; Attendance: 1000; Referee: Mukhtar Al Yarimi (Yemen )

14 November 2007	Kuwait	2–0	Iraq	Al-Salmiya, Kuwait
17:15 AST	M. Al-Shammari 2', 9'	(Report)		Stadium: Thamir Stadium; Attendance: 400; Referee: Muhsen Basma (Syria)

21 November 2007	United Arab Emirates	2–0	Kuwait	Dubai, UAE
18:00 UAET	S. Saleh 24'	(Report)		Stadium: Al-Ahli Stadium; Attendance: 300; Referee: Salem Mujghef (Jordan)

28 November 2007	Iraq	1–0	United Arab Emirates	Damascus, Syria
14:00 EET	Nadeem 18'	(Report)		Stadium: Al−Abbasiyyin Stadium; Attendance: 3500; Referee: Masoud Moradi (Iran)

== Group B ==
Team	Pld	W	D	L	GF	GA	GD	Pts
Iran (H)	5	4	1	0	20	0	+20	13
Lebanon	5	4	0	1	10	4	+6	12
Oman	5	2	2	1	5	4	+1	8
India	5	1	1	3	8	6	+2	4
Bahrain	5	1	1	3	2	8	−6	4
Pakistan	5	0	1	4	0	23	−23	1

6 November 2007	India	2–3	Lebanon	Tehran, Iran
14:00 IRST	Thoi 4'; Subodh 29' (pen.)	(Report)	A. Bazzi 35' (pen.), 71'; M. Chahine 86'	Stadium: Paas Stadium; Attendance: 100; Referee: Khalaf Mohammad Allabany (Yemen )

6 November 2007	Bahrain	1–2	Oman	Tehran, Iran
15:00 IRST	Mohamed 29'	(Report)	Hussain 64', 90'	Stadium: Rah Ahan Stadium; Attendance: 150; Referee: Vo Minh Tri (Vietnam)

6 November 2007	Iran	14–0	Pakistan	Tehran, Iran
18:00 IRST	B. Rahmani 3', 45', 89'; J. Alimohammadi 5', 20', 36' (pen.); K. Ansarifard 6', 9', 45+1', 62', 73'; Sh. Shirvand 38'; R. Kar 51' (pen.); A. Derakhshan 90+3'	(Report)		Stadium: Paas Stadium; Attendance: 200; Referee: Mukhtar Al Yarimi (Yemen )

9 November 2007	Oman	1–0	Pakistan	Tehran, Iran
14:00 IRST	Hussain 40'	(Report)		Stadium: Rah Ahan Stadium; Attendance: 100; Referee: Khalaf Mohammad Allabany (Yemen )

9 November 2007	India	0–1	Bahrain	Tehran, Iran
15:00 IRST	Jibon (red card) 84'	(Report)	Mohamed 90+3' (pen.)	Stadium: Paas Stadium; Attendance: 100; Referee: Sabah Kasim Khalaf (Iraq)

9 November 2007	Lebanon	0–1	Iran	Tehran, Iran
18:00 IRST		(Report)	I. Moosavi 83'	Stadium: Rah Ahan Stadium; Attendance: 200; Referee: Ali A. A. al-Mutlaq (Saudi Arabia)

11 November 2007	Pakistan	0–5	India	Tehran, Iran
14:00 IRST		(Report)	Kisku 5' (pen.), 82' (pen.); Sabeet 15'; Thoi 19'; Dawn 88'	Stadium: Rah Ahan Stadium; Attendance: 50; Referee: Mukhtar Al Yarimi (Yemen )

11 November 2007	Lebanon	2–0	Bahrain	Tehran, Iran
15:00 IRST	M. Haidar 12'; A. Bazzi 78'	(Report)		Stadium: Paas Stadium; Attendance: 25; Referee: Vo Minh Tri (Vietnam)

11 November 2007	Iran	0–0	Oman	Tehran, Iran
18:00 IRST		(Report)		Stadium: Rah Ahan Stadium; Attendance: 200; Referee: Ali A. A. al-Mutlaq (Saudi Arabia)

14 November 2007	Pakistan	0–3	Lebanon	Tehran, Iran
14:00 IRST		(Report)	A. Bazzi 63'; Mehdi 64' (o.g.); A. Zreik 85'	Stadium: Rah Ahan Stadium; Attendance: 10; Referee: Sabah Kasim Khalaf (Iraq)

14 November 2007	Oman	1–1	India	Tehran, Iran
15:00 IRST	Hussain 39'	(Report)	Subodh 57'	Stadium: Paas Stadium; Attendance: 50; Referee: Vo Minh Tri (Vietnam)

14 November 2007	Bahrain	0–4	Iran	Tehran, Iran
18:00 IRST	Mohamed al-Alawi (red card) 57'	(Report)	J. Alimohammadi 45+1'; B. Rahmani 71'; S. Aghazamani 80'; I. Mossavi 88'	Stadium: Rah Ahan Stadium; Attendance: 400; Referee: Kadhum Auda (Iraq)

17 November 2007	Pakistan	0–0	Bahrain	Tehran, Iran
14:00 IRST	M. Haroon (red card) 90+2'	(Report)		Stadium: Rah Ahan Stadium; Attendance: 0 Referee: Mukhtar Al Yarimi (Yemen )

17 November 2007	Lebanon	2–1	Oman	Tehran, Iran
15:00 IRST	A. Zreik 43'; H. Alaoueih 64'	(Report)	Qasim (red card) 57'; Hussain 90+2'	Stadium: Paas Stadium; Attendance: 50; Referee: Ali A. A. al-Mutlaq (Saudi Arabia)

17 November 2007	Iran	1–0	India	Tehran, Iran
18:00 IRST	J. Alimohammadi 40'	(Report)		Stadium: Rah Ahan Stadium; Attendance: 300; Referee: Kadhum Auda (Iraq)

== Group C ==
Team	Pld	W	D	L	GF	GA	GD	Pts
Syria	4	3	1	0	18	1	+17	10
Tajikistan	4	3	1	0	17	1	+16	10
Qatar (H)	4	2	0	2	14	5	+9	6
Turkmenistan	4	1	0	3	9	8	+1	3
Bhutan	4	0	0	4	0	43	−43	0
Kyrgyzstan (W)	0	-	-	-	-	-	—	0

(W) Withdrew

6 November 2007	Tajikistan	4–0	Turkmenistan	Doha, Qatar
17:30 AST	Saidov 22'; Fuzaylov 50', 65'; Tukhtasunov 72'	(Report)		Stadium: Grand Hamad Stadium; Attendance: 100; Referee: Ala Abdul Kadir Nema (Iraq)

6 November 2007	Syria	1–0	Qatar	Doha, Qatar
19:30 AST	M. Abadi 34'	(Report)		Stadium: Grand Hamad Stadium; Attendance: 1000; Referee: Fareed Ali Mohamed al-Marzouqi (United Arab Emirates)

8 November 2007	Tajikistan	1–1	Syria	Doha, Qatar
17:30 AST	Davronov 67'	(Report)	M. Abadi 36'	Stadium: Grand Hamad Stadium; Attendance: 500; Referee: Subrata Sarkar (India)

8 November 2007	Qatar	13–0	Bhutan	Doha, Qatar
19:30 AST	Ahmed 9', 62'; Nasser 10'; Hassan 30', 40', 58', 90+1'; Abdelaziz 63'; Ziad 54'; M. Harees 65'; Yousuf al-Muazin 70', 79', 85'	(Report)		Stadium: Grand Hamad Stadium; Attendance: 300; Referee: Talaat Najm (Lebanon)

10 November 2007	Turkmenistan	0–3	Syria	Doha, Qatar
17:30 AST		(Report)	A. al-Mjrmsh 25'; M. Jaafar 70'; S. Solaiman 87'	Stadium: Grand Hamad Stadium; Attendance: 300; Referee: Fareed Ali Mohamed al-Marzouqi (United Arab Emirates)

10 November 2007	Bhutan	0–8	Tajikistan	Doha, Qatar
19:30 AST		(Report)	Saidov 7', 9'; Vasiev 13'; Tokhirov 42', 56', 72', 90+2'; Shohzukhurov 44'; Zoirov 87'	Stadium: Grand Hamad Stadium; Attendance: 100; Referee: Ala Abdul Kadir Nema (Iraq)

12 November 2007	Qatar	0–4	Tajikistan	Doha, Qatar
17:30 AST		(Report)	Shohzukhurov 5', 73'; Saidov 14'; Vasiev 63'	Stadium: Grand Hamad Stadium; Attendance: 100; Referee: Talaat Najm (Lebanon)

12 November 2007	Bhutan	0–9	Turkmenistan	Doha, Qatar
19:30 AST		(Report)	Renat 2'; Arabov 7', 54', 59', 63'; Agajan 13'; Amanov 38'; Begench 71'; Boliyan 90'	Stadium: Grand Hamad Stadium; Attendance: 50; Referee: Subrata Sarkar (India)

14 November 2007	Bhutan	0–13	Syria	Doha, Qatar
17:30 AST	Jigme (red card) 90+1'	(Report)	M. Abadi 3', 11', 24', 26'; M. Jaafar 14'; T. Haj Mohamad 18', 50', 74'; A. Tit 21', 29'; S. Solaiman 27', 53'; A. Hasan 66'	Stadium: Grand Hamad Stadium; Attendance: 400; Referee: Ala Abdul Kadir Nema (Iraq)

14 November 2007	Turkmenistan	0–1	Qatar	Doha, Qatar
19:30 AST		(Report)	Yousuf 11'	Stadium: Grand Hamad Stadium; Attendance: 50; Referee: Fareed Ali Mohamed al-Marzouqi (United Arab Emirates)

== Group D ==
Team	Pld	W	D	L	GF	GA	GD	Pts
Uzbekistan (H)	3	3	0	0	5	1	+4	9
Yemen	3	1	1	1	3	1	+2	4
Jordan	3	1	1	1	3	3	0	4
Nepal	3	0	0	3	0	6	−6	0
Palestine (D)	0	-	-	-	-	-	—	0
Afghanistan (D)	0	-	-	-	-	-	—	0

(D) Disqualified

6 November 2007	Jordan	2–0	Nepal	Tashkent, Uzbekistan
11:00 UZT	Abu Hwaiti 2' (pen.); Shishani 51'	(Report)		Stadium: Lokomotiv Stadium; Attendance: 1000; Referee: Rustam Kholov (Tajikistan)

6 November 2007	Uzbekistan	1–0	Yemen	Tashkent, Uzbekistan
15:00 UZT	Mirzaev 77' (red card) 77'; Karimov (red card) 88'	(Report)		Stadium: Lokomotiv Stadium; Attendance: 2000; Referee: Mahmood Mohd Juma al-Ghatrifi (Oman)

8 November 2007	Nepal	0–3	Yemen	Tashkent, Uzbekistan
11:00 UZT		(Report)	Al-Anbari 65'; Al-Blay 66'; H. Al-Ghazi 76'	Stadium: Lokomotiv Stadium; Attendance: 700; Referee: Emil Busurmankulov (Kyrgyzstan)

8 November 2007	Jordan	1–3	Uzbekistan	Tashkent, Uzbekistan
15:00 UZT	Al-Rawashdeh 8'	(Report)	Azizov 11', 41'; Shikhov 90+3'	Stadium: Lokomotiv Stadium; Attendance: 2500; Referee: Kadyrbek Chynybekov (Kyrgyzstan)

10 November 2007	Yemen	0–0	Jordan	Tashkent, Uzbekistan
11:00 UZT		(Report)		Stadium: Lokomotiv Stadium; Attendance: 700; Referee: Mahmood Mohd Juma al-Ghatrifi (Oman)

10 November 2007	Nepal	0–1	Uzbekistan	Tashkent, Uzbekistan
15:00 UZT		(Report)	Turaev 21'	Stadium: Lokomotiv Stadium; Attendance: 2000; Referee: Rustam Kholov (Tajikistan)

== Group E ==
Team	Pld	W	D	L	GF	GA	GD	Pts
Japan	5	5	0	0	20	3	+17	15
Thailand (H)	5	4	0	1	12	3	+9	12
Laos	5	1	2	2	8	15	−7	5
Maldives	5	0	3	2	3	7	−4	3
Myanmar	5	0	3	2	4	13	−9	3
Chinese Taipei	5	0	2	3	5	11	−6	2

6 November 2007	Japan	3–1	Chinese Taipei	Bangkok, Thailand
16:00 THA	Mizunuma 51'; Shiratani 76'; Yamazaki 83'	(Report)	C.W. Chiang 33'	Stadium: Supachalasai National Stadium; Attendance: 200; Referee: Rosdi Shaharul (Malaysia)

6 November 2007	Thailand	3–0	Maldives	Bangkok, Thailand
18:30 THA	W. Jarernsri 14'; A. Srichaloung 36'; C. Boodhad 77'	(Report)		Stadium: Supachalasai National Stadium; Attendance: 1000; Referee: Wan Daxue (China)

8 November 2007	Laos	3–3	Myanmar	Bangkok, Thailand
16:00 THA	S. Kanlaya 28', 61'; S. Souliyavong 39'	(Report)	Win Thu 12'; K.K. Khine 36'; A.K. Myo 37'	Stadium: Supachalasai National Stadium; Attendance: 200; Referee: Tan Hai (China)

8 November 2007	Maldives	0–1	Japan	Bangkok, Thailand
18:30 THA		(Report)	Higa 44' (pen.)	Stadium: Supachalasai National Stadium; Attendance: 300; Referee: Duong Hien Van (Vietnam)

10 November 2007	Thailand	3–0	Laos	Bangkok, Thailand
16:00 THA	Y. Namueangrak 7' (pen.); S. Ramkularbsuk 68', 75'	(Report)		Stadium: Supachalasai National Stadium; Attendance: 1500; Referee: Tayeb Hasan Shamsuzzaman (Bangladesh)

10 November 2007	Myanmar	0–0	Chinese Taipei	Bangkok, Thailand
18:30 THA		(Report)		Stadium: Supachalasai National Stadium; Attendance: 150; Referee: Rosdi Shaharul (Malaysia)

12 November 2007	Maldives	2–2	Laos	Bangkok, Thailand
16:00 THA	Abdulla 44' (pen.); Jilwaz 69'		T. Soubandit 20' (pen.); P. Chanhpadit 51'	Stadium: Supachalasai National Stadium; Attendance: 150; Referee: Tan Hai (China)

12 November 2007	Japan	8–0	Myanmar	Bangkok, Thailand
18:30 THA	Higa 8'; Suzuki 15', 90+1'; Nagai 16'; Shiratani 49'; Yamazaki 73', 76'; Kakitani 90+4'	(Report)		Stadium: Supachalasai National Stadium; Attendance: 200; Referee: Tayeb Hasan Shamsuzzaman (Bangladesh)

14 November 2007	Chinese Taipei	0–3	Thailand	Bangkok, Thailand
16:00 THA	C.H. Chen (red card) 90+2'	(Report)	S. Phomphinit 40'; A. Srichaloung 84'; C. Kaewsooktae 90+3'	Stadium: Supachalasai National Stadium; Attendance: 500; Referee: Duong Hien Van (Vietnam)

14 November 2007	Laos	0–5	Japan	Bangkok, Thailand
18:30 THA		(Report)	Suzaki 19'; Kakitani 34'; Yamazaki 83'; Yamamoto 89'; Shiratani 90+1'	Stadium: Supachalasai National Stadium; Attendance: 250; Referee: Wan Daxue (China)

16 November 2007	Myanmar	0–1	Thailand	Bangkok, Thailand
18:30 THA		(Report)	Y. Namueangrak 90+2'	Stadium: Royal Thai Army Stadium; Attendance: 500; Referee: Tan Hai (China)

16 November 2007	Chinese Taipei	1–1	Maldives	Bangkok, Thailand
16:00 THA	I.H. Chiu 15'	(Report)	Nashid 84'	Stadium: Royal Thai Army Stadium; Attendance: 200; Referee: Tayeb Hasan Shamsuzzaman (Bangladesh)

18 November 2007	Thailand	2–3	Japan	Bangkok, Thailand
16:00 THA	Jaroensuk 10'; Thaweekarn 14'		Kanai 39'; Suzuki 63'; Yamazaki 90+3'	Stadium: Thai-Japanese Stadium; Attendance: 250; Referee: Wan Daxue (China)

18 November 2007	Chinese Taipei	2–3	Laos	Bangkok, Thailand
16:00 THA	I.H. Chiu 46'; Y. Hsu 89'	(Report)	M. Sompong 28'; S. Phatthana 50', 59'	Stadium: Royal Thai Army Stadium; Attendance: 100; Referee: Rosdi Shaharul (Malaysia)

18 November 2007	Maldives	0–0	Myanmar	Bangkok, Thailand
18:30 THA		(Report)		Stadium: Royal Thai Army Stadium; Attendance: 100; Referee: Tan Hai (China)

== Group F ==
Team	Pld	W	D	L	GF	GA	GD	Pts
North Korea	4	4	0	0	14	2	+12	12
China (H)	4	3	0	1	18	2	+16	9
Malaysia	4	1	1	2	5	4	+1	4
Singapore	4	1	1	2	6	10	−4	4
Macau	4	0	0	4	0	25	−25	0
Timor-Leste (D)	0	-	-	-	-	-	—	0

(D) Disqualified

6 November 2007	China	7–1	Singapore	Liuzhou, China
16:00 CST	Y. Tan 9'; Ch.D. Zhang 19'; L. Wang 45+1'; L. Zhao 70', 87'; Y. Wang 71'; Y. Zhang 88'	(Report)	Fabian 39'	Stadium: Liuzhou Sports Centre Stadium; Attendance: 12,000; Referee: Satop Tongkhan (Thailand)

6 November 2007	Malaysia	4–0	Macau	Liuzhou, China
20:00 CST	Fakri 21', 39'; Syazwan 47'; Thamil 90+1'	(Report)		Stadium: Liuzhou Sports Centre Stadium; Attendance: 5000; Referee: Sgt. Win Cho (Myanmar)

8 November 2007	Singapore	1–3	North Korea	Liuzhou, China
17:00 CST	Haniff 8'	(Report)	A. Il-Bom 38'; M. Cha-Hyon 56'; R. Myong-Jun 72'	Stadium: Liuzhou Sports Centre Stadium; Attendance: 2000; Referee: Ali Saleem (Maldives)

8 November 2007	China	1–0	Malaysia	Liuzhou, China
20:00 CST	Y. Yu 12'	(Report)		Stadium: Liuzhou Sports Centre Stadium; Attendance: 4700; Referee: Ram Krishna Gosh (Bangladesh)

10 November 2007	North Korea	7–0	Macau	Liuzhou, China
17:00 CST	M. Cha-Hyon 27'; R. Myong-Jun 32', 36'; A. Il-Bom 41'; R. Jin-Hyok 70'; K. Kyong-Gwang 79'; O Jin-Hyok 83'	(Report)		Stadium: Liuzhou Sports Centre Stadium; Attendance: 400; Referee: Sgt. Win Cho (Myanmar)

10 November 2007	Singapore	0–0	Malaysia	Liuzhou, China
20:00 CST		(Report)		Stadium: Liuzhou Sports Centre Stadium; Attendance: 400; Referee: Satop Tongkhan (Thailand)

12 November 2007	Malaysia	1–3	North Korea	Liuzhou, China
17:00 CST	Bashahrul 10'	(Report)	A. Il-Bom 7'; R. Sang-Chol 35'; R. Myong-Jun 55'	Stadium: Liuzhou Sports Centre Stadium; Attendance: 300; Referee: Ali Saleem (Maldives)

12 November 2008	Macau	0–10	China	Liuzhou, China
20:00 CST		(Report)	D. Gao 4', 11', 14', 66', 90+2'; Y. Tan 15', 18'; X. Wu 29'; Y. Yu 30'; Zh.Ch. Li 71'	Stadium: Liuzhou Sports Centre Stadium; Attendance: 700; Referee: Ram Krishna Gosh (Bangladesh)

14 November 2007	China	0–1	North Korea	Liuzhou, China
20:00 CST		(Report)	A. Il-Bom 90+2'	Stadium: Liuzhou Sports Centre Stadium; Attendance: 12,100; Referee: Ram Krishna Gosh (Bangladesh)

14 November 2007	Singapore	4–0	Macau	Liuzhou, China
17:00 CST	Fazli 16', 32'; Yasir 26'; Izzdin 53'	(Report)		Stadium: Liuzhou Sports Centre Stadium; Attendance: 380; Referee: Satop Tongkhan (Thailand)

== Group G ==
Team	Pld	W	D	L	GF	GA	GD	Pts
South Korea	4	4	0	0	39	1	+38	12
Australia	4	3	0	1	19	4	+15	9
Indonesia	4	2	0	2	14	5	+9	6
Vietnam (H)	4	1	0	3	18	8	+10	3
Guam	4	0	0	4	0	72	−72	0
Hong Kong (W)	0	-	-	-	-	-	—	0

(W) Withdrew

6 November 2007	South Korea	28–0	Guam	Ho Chi Minh City, Vietnam
15:30 ICT	Ja-Cheol 3', 21', 53'; Young-Cheol 4', 16', 25', 34', 36', 43', 55', 56', 67', 89'; Seung-Yeoul 7', 33'; Yong-Duk 8'; Dong-Sub 19', 23', 32', 40', 45', 68', 70'; Jeong-Ho 49', 85'; Yong 75'; Jong-Won 78', 86'	(Report)		Stadium: Thanh Long Sports Centre; Attendance: 1500; Referee: Chaiwat Kunsuta (Thailand)

6 November 2007	Australia	2–0	Indonesia	Ho Chi Minh City, Vietnam
18:00 ICT	D. Mullen 60'; Nichols 80'	(Report)		Stadium: Thanh Long Sports Centre; Attendance: 1500; Referee: Yang Zhiqiang (China)

8 November 2007	Australia	2–0	Vietnam	Ho Chi Minh City, Vietnam
15:30 ICT	Nichols 73'; Elasi (red card) 82'; Cernak 86'	(Report)	Nguyễn Văn Nam (red card) 80'	Stadium: Thanh Long Sports Centre; Attendance: 2000; Referee: Mahmoud Turki (Syria)

8 November 2007	Indonesia	0–3	South Korea	Ho Chi Minh City, Vietnam
18:00 ICT		(Report)	Mahendra 65' (o.g.); Seung-Yeoul 88'; Young-Cheoul 90+1'	Stadium: Thanh Long Sports Centre; Attendance: 2000; Referee: Rustam Saidov (Uzbekistan)

10 November 2007	Indonesia	2–0	Vietnam	Ho Chi Minh City, Vietnam
15:30 ICT	Harmoko 57'; Mahendra (red card) 74'; Riski 88'	(Report)		Stadium: Thanh Long Sports Centre; Attendance: 2000; Referee: Mohamad Mansour (Lebanon)

10 November 2007	Guam	0–15	Australia	Ho Chi Minh City, Vietnam
18:00 ICT		(Report)	Nichols 9', 35', 51'; Minniecon 15', 41'; Trifiro 31', 45+1'; Jesic 45+2'; Lujic 55'; Hoffman 60'; Cernak 70'; Ryall 74', 80'; Theodore 85'; De Vere 90+2'	Stadium: Thanh Long Sports Centre; Attendance: 500; Referee: Rustam Saidov (Uzbekistan)

12 November 2007	Guam	0–12	Indonesia	Ho Chi Minh City, Vietnam
15:30 ICT		(Report)	Riski 9'; Egi 45+2', 56', 89'; Ramdani 55', 80'; Lucky 64', 77'; Ricky O. 67', 71', 86'; Hendro 87'	Stadium: Thanh Long Sports Centre; Attendance: 1000; Referee: Yang Zhiqiang (China)

12 November 2007	Vietnam	1–4	South Korea	Ho Chi Minh City, Vietnam
18:00 ICT	Hoàng Văn Bình 27'	(Report)	Seung-Yeoul 37'; Jong-Won 45'; Young-Cheol 55'; Bo-Kyung 87'	Stadium: Thanh Long Sports Centre; Attendance: 1000; Referee: Chaiwat Kunsunta (Thailand)

14 November 2007	South Korea	4–0	Australia	Ho Chi Minh City, Vietnam
15:30 ICT	Bo-Kyung 3'; Dong-Sub 28'; Young-Cheol 40'; Seung-Il 69'	(Report)		Stadium: Thanh Long Sports Centre; Attendance: 1000; Referee: Mohamad Mansour (Lebanon)

14 November 2007	Guam	0–17	Vietnam	Ho Chi Minh City, Vietnam
18:00 ICT		(Report)	Trần Thế Vương 2', 70', 75'; Nguyễn Văn Quân 4', 12', 25'; Hoàng Danh Ngọc 17'; Trần Mạnh Dũng 45'; Nguyễn Đình Hiệp 48', 63', 85', 86', 88'; Nguyễn Trọng Hoàng 71', 80', 84', 90+1'	Stadium: Thanh Long Sports Centre; Attendance: 1000; Referee: Mahmoud Turki (Syria)

== Qualified For The AFC U-19 Championship 2008 ==
- Australia
- China
- Iran
- Iraq
- Japan
- Jordan
- North Korea
- South Korea
- Lebanon
- Syria
- Thailand
- Tajikistan
- Uzbekistan
- United Arab Emirates
- Yemen
- Saudi Arabia (host country)
