= Football at the 2010 Asian Games – Men's tournament =

Men's Football Tournament at the 2010 Asian Games
Tournament details
- Host country: China
- Dates: 7 – 25 November
- Teams: 24 (from 1 confederation)
- Venues: 7 (in 1 host city)

Final positions
- Champions: Japan (1st title)
- Runners-up: United Arab Emirates
- Third place: South Korea
- Fourth place: Iran

Tournament statistics
- Matches played: 50
- Goals scored: 134 (2.68 per match)
- Attendance: 729,347 (14,587 per match)
- Top scorer: (Japan) Kensuke Nagai (5 goals)

The men's football tournament at the 2010 Asian Games was held in Guangzhou in China from 8 to 25 November.

== Venues ==
Seven venues were used during the tournament, all of them are in Guangzhou. Tianhe Stadium hosted the final.

Guangzhou
Tianhe	Panyu		Yuexiu		Huadu	Huangpu
Tianhe Stadium	University Town Main Stadium	Ying Tung Stadium	Yuexiushan Stadium	Guangdong Provincial Stadium	Huadu Stadium	Huangpu Sports Center Stadium
Capacity: 56,000	Capacity: 50,000	Capacity: 14,818	Capacity: 30,000	Capacity: 27,096	Capacity: 13,395	Capacity: 10,000
Map of Guangdong with 2010 Football of Asian Games venues marked.

== Group stage ==
All times are China Standard Time (UTC+08:00)

=== Pool matches ===
==== Group A ====
Pos	Team	Pld	W	D	L	GF	GA	GD	Pts
1	Japan	3	3	0	0	8	0	+8	9
2	China	3	2	0	1	5	4	+1	6
3	Malaysia	3	1	0	2	2	6	−4	3
4	Kyrgyzstan	3	0	0	3	2	7	−5	0

Source: RSSSF
8 November
16:00

Malaysia	2–1	Kyrgyzstan
Idlan 27'; Chanthuru 60'		Sydykov 37'

Huadu Stadium, Guangzhou
Attendance: 2,740
Referee: Win Cho (Myanmar)

8 November
19:00

China	0–3	Japan
		Yamazaki 11'; Nagai 58'; Suzuki 64'

Tianhe Stadium, Guangzhou
Attendance: 43,000
Referee: Valentin Kovalenko (Uzbekistan)

10 November
16:00

Malaysia	0–2	Japan
		Nagai 26'; Yamaguchi 64'

Huadu Stadium, Guangzhou
Attendance: 5,245
Referee: Ali Abdulnabi (Bahrain)

10 November
19:00

China	2–1	Kyrgyzstan
Lü Wenjun 84'; Wu Xi 90+4'		Sidorenko 5'

Tianhe Stadium, Guangzhou
Attendance: 38,000
Referee: Ali Shaban (Kuwait)

13 November
19:00

China	3–0	Malaysia
Li Jianbin 61'; Zhao Honglüe 65'; Zhang Linpeng 83' (pen.)

Tianhe Stadium, Guangzhou
Attendance: 35,000
Referee: Ben Williams (Australia)

13 November
19:00

Kyrgyzstan	0–3	Japan
		Noborizato 5', 61' (pen.); Tomiyama 79' (pen.)

Huadu Stadium, Guangzhou
Attendance: 8,783
Referee: Yu Ming-hsun (Chinese Taipei)

==== Group B ====
Pos	Team	Pld	W	D	L	GF	GA	GD	Pts
1	Iran	3	3	0	0	6	1	+5	9
2	Turkmenistan	3	1	1	1	8	7	+1	4
3	Vietnam	3	1	0	2	5	8	−3	3
4	Bahrain	3	0	1	2	2	5	−3	1

Source: RSSSF
8 November
16:00

Vietnam	3–1	Bahrain
Đinh Thanh Trung 34'; Nguyễn Trọng Hoàng 72'; Nguyễn Anh Đức 89'		Isa 90+3' (pen.)

Guangdong People's Stadium, Guangzhou
Attendance: 9,000
Referee: Tayeb Shamsuzzaman (Bangladesh)

8 November
19:00

Iran	4–1	Turkmenistan
Hosseini 26', 61'; Ansarifard 84'; Daghagheleh 90+4'		Hangeldiýew 49'

University Town Stadium, Guangzhou
Attendance: 21,500
Referee: Ali Shaban (Kuwait)

10 November
16:00

Vietnam	2–6	Turkmenistan
Nguyễn Trọng Hoàng 85'; Nguyễn Anh Đức 87'		Geldiýew 17'; Boliýan 24', 73'; Belyh 49'; Amanow 62', 83'

Guangdong People's Stadium, Guangzhou
Attendance: 5,429
Referee: Ali Sabbagh (Lebanon)

10 November
19:00

Iran	1–0	Bahrain
Ansarifard 45+1'

University Town Stadium, Guangzhou
Attendance: 22,300
Referee: Ben Williams (Australia)

13 November
19:00

Iran	1–0	Vietnam
Hosseini 4'

University Town Stadium, Guangzhou
Attendance: 23,170
Referee: Mohamed Al-Zarouni (United Arab Emirates)

13 November
19:00

Bahrain	1–1	Turkmenistan
Showaiter 49'		Mingazow 48'

Guangdong People's Stadium, Guangzhou
Attendance: 8,527
Referee: Zhao Liang (China)

==== Group C ====
Pos	Team	Pld	W	D	L	GF	GA	GD	Pts
1	North Korea	3	3	0	0	7	0	+7	9
2	South Korea	3	2	0	1	7	1	+6	6
3	Palestine	3	0	1	2	0	6	−6	1
4	Jordan	3	0	1	2	0	7	−7	1

Source: RSSSF
8 November
16:00

South Korea	0–1	North Korea
		Ri Kwang-chon 36'

Yuexiushan Stadium, Guangzhou
Attendance: 8,000
Referee: Ben Williams (Australia)

8 November
19:00

Palestine	0–0	Jordan

Ying Tung Stadium, Guangzhou
Attendance: 3,682
Referee: Banjar Al-Dosari (Qatar)

10 November
16:00

South Korea	4–0	Jordan
Koo Ja-cheol 21', 44'; Kim Bo-kyung 46'; Cho Young-cheol 78'

Yuexiushan Stadium, Guangzhou
Attendance: 10,000
Referee: Tayeb Shamsuzzaman (Bangladesh)

10 November
19:00

Palestine	0–3	North Korea
		Kim Kuk-jin 8'; Choe Kum-chol 28'; Pak Kwang-ryong 67'

Ying Tung Stadium, Guangzhou
Attendance: 4,168
Referee: Tan Hai (China)

13 November
16:00

South Korea	3–0	Palestine
Yoon Bit-garam 10'; Park Chu-young 13'; Park Hee-seong 52'

Yuexiushan Stadium, Guangzhou
Attendance: 11,000
Referee: Ibrahim Al-Hosni (Oman)

13 November
16:00

Jordan	0–3	North Korea
		Kim Yong-jun 17'; Choe Myong-ho 81' (pen.); Choe Kum-chol 85'

Ying Tung Stadium, Guangzhou
Attendance: 9,080
Referee: Valentin Kovalenko (Uzbekistan)

==== Group D ====
Pos	Team	Pld	W	D	L	GF	GA	GD	Pts
1	Qatar	3	2	1	0	4	1	+3	7
2	Athletes from Kuwait	3	2	0	1	4	2	+2	6
3	India	3	1	0	2	5	5	0	3
4	Singapore	3	0	1	2	1	6	−5	1

Source: RSSSF
7 November
16:00

Athletes from Kuwait	2–0	India
Ajab 6', 53'

Huadu Stadium, Guangzhou
Attendance: 3,121
Referee: Saeid Mozaffarizadeh (Iran)

7 November
19:00

Qatar	0–0	Singapore

Ying Tung Stadium, Guangzhou
Attendance: 500
Referee: Minoru Tojo (Japan)

9 November
16:00

Qatar	2–1	India
Al-Marri 80', 88'		Ravanan 19'

Huadu Stadium, Guangzhou
Attendance: 3,560
Referee: Zhao Liang (China)

9 November
19:00

Athletes from Kuwait	2–0	Singapore
Maqseed 11'; Al-Azmi 24'

Ying Tung Stadium, Guangzhou
Attendance: 1,048
Referee: Ibrahim Al-Hosni (Oman)

11 November
19:00

India	4–1	Singapore
Raja 13'; B. Singh 62'; Ji. Singh 67'; Maithani 75'		Eugene 83'

Huadu Stadium, Guangzhou
Attendance: 6,697
Referee: Kadhum Auda (Iraq)

11 November
19:00

Qatar	2–0	Athletes from Kuwait
Hatem 32'; Ahmed 90+4'

Ying Tung Stadium, Guangzhou
Attendance: 5,032
Referee: Choi Myung-yong (South Korea)

==== Group E ====
Pos	Team	Pld	W	D	L	GF	GA	GD	Pts
1	United Arab Emirates	3	2	1	0	7	1	+6	7
2	Hong Kong	3	2	1	0	6	2	+4	7
3	Uzbekistan	3	1	0	2	3	4	−1	3
4	Bangladesh	3	0	0	3	1	10	−9	0

Source: RSSSF
7 November
16:00

Uzbekistan	3–0	Bangladesh
Turaev 23'; Ahmedov 43'; Nagaev 81'

Ying Tung Stadium, Guangzhou
Attendance: 3,750
Referee: Ali Abdulnabi (Bahrain)

7 November
19:00

United Arab Emirates	1–1	Hong Kong
Mousa 37'		Chan Man Fai 81'

Huadu Stadium, Guangzhou
Attendance: 3,180
Referee: Choi Myung-yong (South Korea)

9 November
16:00

United Arab Emirates	3–0	Bangladesh
Khalil 46'; Fawzi 63', 82'

Ying Tung Stadium, Guangzhou
Attendance: 3,224
Referee: Võ Minh Trí (Vietnam)

9 November
19:00

Uzbekistan	0–1	Hong Kong
		Chan Wai Ho 60'

Huadu Stadium, Guangzhou
Attendance: 6,800
Referee: Kadhum Auda (Iraq)

11 November
16:00

Hong Kong	4–1	Bangladesh
Au Yeung Yiu Chung 2', 33'; Ju Yingzhi 41'; Chan Man Fai 87'		Enamul Haque 24'

Huadu Stadium, Guangzhou
Attendance: 8,438
Referee: Saeid Mozaffarizadeh (Iran)

11 November
16:00

Uzbekistan	0–3	United Arab Emirates
		Awana 10'; Khalil 17', 78'

Ying Tung Stadium, Guangzhou
Attendance: 4,118
Referee: Minoru Tojo (Japan)

==== Group F ====
Pos	Team	Pld	W	D	L	GF	GA	GD	Pts
1	Oman	3	2	1	0	6	1	+5	7
2	Thailand	3	1	2	0	7	1	+6	5
3	Maldives	3	0	2	1	0	3	−3	2
4	Pakistan	3	0	1	2	0	8	−8	1

Source: RSSSF
7 November
16:00

Maldives	0–3	Oman
		Al-Mukhaini 21'; Al-Saadi 88'; Abdulhadi 90+1'

Guangdong People's Stadium, Guangzhou
Attendance: 9,000
Referee: Tan Hai (China)

7 November
19:00

Thailand	6–0	Pakistan
Thonglao 15', 29'; Dangda 16', 73'; Keawsombat 59'; Jujeen 65'

Huangpu Sports Center Stadium, Guangzhou
Attendance: 6,883
Referee: Ali Sabbagh (Lebanon)

9 November
16:00

Thailand	1–1	Oman
Al-Shatri 44' (o.g.)		Al-Mukhaini 45+1'

Guangdong People's Stadium, Guangzhou
Attendance: 4,500
Referee: Mohamed Al-Zarouni (United Arab Emirates)

9 November
19:00

Maldives	0–0	Pakistan

Huangpu Sports Center Stadium, Guangzhou
Attendance: 7,200
Referee: Yu Ming-hsun (Chinese Taipei)

11 November
19:00

Oman	2–0	Pakistan
Al-Gheilani 10'; Al-Saadi 65'

Guangdong People's Stadium, Guangzhou
Attendance: 8,000
Referee: Võ Minh Trí (Vietnam)

11 November
19:00

Thailand	0–0	Maldives

Huangpu Sports Center Stadium, Guangzhou
Attendance: 10,000
Referee: Banjar Al-Dosari (Qatar)

==== Third-placed teams ====
Pos	Team	Pld	W	D	L	GF	GA	GD	Pts
1	India	3	1	0	2	5	5	0	3
2	Uzbekistan	3	1	0	2	3	4	−1	3
3	Vietnam	3	1	0	2	5	8	−3	3
4	Malaysia	3	1	0	2	2	6	−4	3
5	Maldives	3	0	2	1	0	3	−3	2
6	Palestine	3	0	1	2	0	6	−6	1

Source: RSSSF

== Knockout round ==
1/8 finals
15 November
China	0
South Korea	3
15 November
Qatar	0
Uzbekistan (a.e.t.)	1
16 November
United Arab Emirates	2
Athletes from Kuwait	0
16 November
North Korea	2
Vietnam	0
15 November
Iran	3
Malaysia	1
15 November
Oman	3
Hong Kong	0
16 November
Turkmenistan	0
Thailand (a.e.t.)	1
16 November
Japan	5
India	0

Quarterfinals
19 November
South Korea (a.e.t.)	3
Uzbekistan	1
19 November
United Arab Emirates (p)	0 (9)
North Korea	0 (8)
19 November
Iran	1
Oman	0
19 November
Thailand	0
Japan	1

Semifinals
23 November
South Korea	0
United Arab Emirates (a.e.t.)	1
23 November
Iran	1
Japan	2

Final
25 November
United Arab Emirates	0
Japan	1
Bronze medal match
25 November
South Korea	4
Iran	3

=== 1/8 finals ===
15 November
16:00

Iran	3–1	Malaysia
Ansarifard 53'; Hosseini 59'; Sharafi 67'		Idlan 86' (pen.)

Yuexiushan Stadium, Guangzhou
Attendance: 9,000
Referee: Tayeb Shamsuzzaman (Bangladesh)

15 November
16:00

Oman	3–0	Hong Kong
Al-Hadhri 30', 61'; Younis 68'

Huangpu Sports Center Stadium, Guangzhou
Attendance: 9,600
Referee: Choi Myung-yong (South Korea)

15 November
19:00

China	0–3	South Korea
		Kim Jung-woo 20'; Park Chu-young 50'; Cho Young-cheol 58'

Tianhe Stadium, Guangzhou
Attendance: 43,682
Referee: Saeid Mozaffarizadeh (Iran)

15 November
19:00

Qatar	0–1 (a.e.t.)	Uzbekistan
		Nagaev 108'

University Town Stadium, Guangzhou
Attendance: 24,690
Referee: Ben Williams (Australia)

16 November
15:30

Japan	5–0	India
Nagai 17', 51'; Yamazaki 28'; Yamamura 45'; Mizunuma 63'

Huangpu Sports Center Stadium, Guangzhou
Attendance: 5,200
Referee: Banjar Al-Dosari (Qatar)

16 November
15:30

North Korea	2–0	Vietnam
Choe Kum-chol 35'; Choe Myong-ho 90+1' (pen.)

Yuexiushan Stadium, Guangzhou
Attendance: 9,000
Referee: Kadhum Auda (Iraq)

16 November
19:00

United Arab Emirates	2–0	Athletes from Kuwait
Al-Kamali 67' (pen.); Mousa 88'

Tianhe Stadium, Guangzhou
Attendance: 32,300
Referee: Valentin Kovalenko (Uzbekistan)

16 November
19:00

Turkmenistan	0–1 (a.e.t.)	Thailand
		Keawsombat 107'

Yuexiushan Stadium, Guangzhou
Attendance: 4,000
Referee: Ali Sabbagh (Lebanon)

=== Quarterfinals ===
19 November
15:30

Thailand	0–1	Japan
		Higashi 45'

Huangpu Sports Center Stadium, Guangzhou
Attendance: 9,300
Referee: Valentin Kovalenko (Uzbekistan)

19 November
16:00

United Arab Emirates	0–0 (a.e.t.)	North Korea
Penalties
Al-Kamali (penalty scored); A. Abdulrahman (penalty scored); Al-Amri (penalty scored); Saleh (penalty scored); O. Abdulrahman (penalty scored); Mousa (penalty scored); Ali (penalty scored); Jamal (penalty scored); Al-Shehhi (penalty scored)	9–8	(penalty scored) Choe Myong-ho; (penalty scored) Choe Kum-chol; (penalty scored) Pak Nam-chol; (penalty scored) An Chol-hyok; (penalty scored) Jon Kwang-ik; (penalty scored) Ri Kwang-hyok; (penalty scored) Kim Kuk-jin; (penalty scored) Pak Chol-min; (penalty missed) Ri Chol-myong

Yuexiushan Stadium, Guangzhou
Attendance: 11,000
Referee: Saeid Mozaffarizadeh (Iran)

19 November
19:00

South Korea	3–1 (a.e.t.)	Uzbekistan
Hong Jeong-ho 3'; Park Chu-young 93'; Kim Bo-kyung 102'		Karimov 72'

Tianhe Stadium, Guangzhou
Attendance: 43,800
Referee: Minoru Tojo (Japan)

19 November
19.00

Iran	1–0	Oman
Aliasgari 41'

Huangpu Sports Center Stadium, Guangzhou
Attendance: 7,700
Referee: Choi Myung-yong (South Korea)

=== Semifinals ===
23 November
16:00

Iran	1–2	Japan
Afshin 6'		Mizunuma 38'; Nagai 60'

Yuexiushan Stadium, Guangzhou
Attendance: 12,000
Referee: Tan Hai (China)

23 November
19:00

South Korea	0–1 (a.e.t.)	United Arab Emirates
		Ali 120+2'

Tianhe Stadium, Guangzhou
Attendance: 42,300
Referee: Ben Williams (Australia)

=== Bronze medal match ===
25 November
15:30

(bronze) South Korea	4–3	Iran
Koo Ja-cheol 48'; Park Chu-young 77'; Ji Dong-won 88', 89'		Rezaei 5'; Aliasgari 45+2'; Ansarifard 49'

Tianhe Stadium, Guangzhou
Attendance: 29,500
Referee: Kadhum Auda (Iraq)

=== Gold medal match ===
25 November
19:00

(silver) United Arab Emirates	0–1	Japan (gold)
		Saneto 74'

Tianhe Stadium, Guangzhou
Attendance: 32,600
Referee: Valentin Kovalenko (Uzbekistan)

== Goalscorers ==
5 goals

- Kensuke Nagai (JPN)

4 goals

- Karim Ansarifard (IRI)
- Jalal Hosseini (IRI)
- Park Chu-young (KOR)

3 goals

- Koo Ja-cheol (KOR)
- Choe Kum-chol (PRK)
- Ahmed Khalil (UAE)

2 goals

- Au Yeung Yiu Chung (HKG)
- Chan Man Fai (HKG)
- Khalid Ajab (IOC)
- Hamid Reza Aliasgari (IRI)
- Kota Mizunuma (JPN)
- Kyohei Noborizato (JPN)
- Ryohei Yamazaki (JPN)
- Cho Young-cheol (KOR)
- Ji Dong-won (KOR)
- Kim Bo-kyung (KOR)
- Norshahrul Idlan (MAS)
- Hussain Al-Hadhri (OMA)
- Al-Moatasim Al-Mukhaini (OMA)
- Waleed Al-Saadi (OMA)
- Choe Myong-ho (PRK)
- Jaralla Al-Marri (QAT)
- Teerasil Dangda (THA)
- Kirati Keawsombat (THA)
- Datsakorn Thonglao (THA)
- Arslanmyrat Amanow (TKM)
- Aleksandr Boliýan (TKM)
- Mohamed Fawzi (UAE)
- Abdullah Mousa (UAE)
- Ivan Nagaev (UZB)
- Nguyễn Anh Đức (VIE)
- Nguyễn Trọng Hoàng (VIE)

1 goal

- Sayed Ali Isa (BRN)
- Fahad Showaiter (BRN)
- Li Jianbin (CHN)
- Lü Wenjun (CHN)
- Wu Xi (CHN)
- Zhang Linpeng (CHN)
- Zhao Honglüe (CHN)
- Chan Wai Ho (HKG)
- Ju Yingzhi (HKG)
- Manish Maithani (IND)
- Jewel Raja (IND)
- Dharmaraj Ravanan (IND)
- Balwant Singh (IND)
- Jibon Singh (IND)
- Mashari Al-Azmi (IOC)
- Ali Maqseed (IOC)
- Arash Afshin (IRI)
- Mehdi Daghagheleh (IRI)
- Gholamreza Rezaei (IRI)
- Amir Sharafi (IRI)
- Keigo Higashi (JPN)
- Yuki Saneto (JPN)
- Daisuke Suzuki (JPN)
- Takamitsu Tomiyama (JPN)
- Hotaru Yamaguchi (JPN)
- Kazuya Yamamura (JPN)
- Pavel Sidorenko (KGZ)
- Aziz Sydykov (KGZ)
- Hong Jeong-ho (KOR)
- Kim Jung-woo (KOR)
- Park Hee-seong (KOR)
- Yoon Bit-garam (KOR)
- Chanthuru Suppiah (MAS)
- Abdullah Abdulhadi (OMA)
- Mohammed Al-Gheilani (OMA)
- Aman Younis (OMA)
- Kim Kuk-jin (PRK)
- Kim Yong-jun (PRK)
- Pak Kwang-ryong (PRK)
- Ri Kwang-chon (PRK)
- Adel Ahmed (QAT)
- Abdulaziz Hatem (QAT)
- Eugene Luo (SIN)
- Anawin Jujeen (THA)
- Maksim Belyh (TKM)
- Serdar Geldiýew (TKM)
- Guwanç Hangeldiýew (TKM)
- Ruslan Mingazow (TKM)
- Hamdan Al-Kamali (UAE)
- Ahmed Ali (UAE)
- Theyab Awana (UAE)
- Odil Ahmedov (UZB)
- Sherzod Karimov (UZB)
- Kenja Turaev (UZB)
- Đinh Thanh Trung (VIE)
- Enamul Haque (BAN)

1 own goal

- Amer Al-Shatri (OMA) (against Thailand)

== Final standing ==
Rank	Team	Pld	W	D	L	GF	GA	GD	Pts
1st place, gold medalist(s)	Japan	7	7	0	0	17	1	+16	21
2nd place, silver medalist(s)	United Arab Emirates	7	4	2	1	10	2	+8	14
3rd place, bronze medalist(s)	South Korea	7	5	0	2	17	6	+11	15
4	Iran	7	5	0	2	14	8	+6	15
5	North Korea	5	4	1	0	9	0	+9	13
6	Oman	5	3	1	1	9	2	+7	10
7	Thailand	5	2	2	1	8	2	+6	8
8	Uzbekistan	5	2	0	3	5	7	−2	6
9	Qatar	4	2	1	1	4	2	+2	7
10	Hong Kong	4	2	1	1	6	5	+1	7
11	Athletes from Kuwait	4	2	0	2	4	4	0	6
12	China	4	2	0	2	5	7	−2	6
13	Turkmenistan	4	1	1	2	8	8	0	4
14	India	4	1	0	3	5	10	−5	3
14	Vietnam	4	1	0	3	5	10	−5	3
16	Malaysia	4	1	0	3	3	9	−6	3
17	Maldives	3	0	2	1	0	3	−3	2
18	Bahrain	3	0	1	2	2	5	−3	1
19	Singapore	3	0	1	2	1	6	−5	1
20	Palestine	3	0	1	2	0	6	−6	1
21	Jordan	3	0	1	2	0	7	−7	1
22	Pakistan	3	0	1	2	0	8	−8	1
23	Kyrgyzstan	3	0	0	3	2	7	−5	0
24	Bangladesh	3	0	0	3	1	10	−9	0
