= 10th International Friendship Youth Tournament =

2012 10th International Friendship Youth Tournament
Tournament details
- Host country: Qatar
- Dates: 3 March – 8 March 2012
- Teams: 4 (from 2 confederations)
- Venue: 1 (in 1 host city)

Tournament statistics
- Matches played: 6
- Goals scored: 14 (2.33 per match)
- Top scorer(s): (Qatar) Huthaifa Al Salemi (Greece) Antonis Ranos (2 goals)

The Qatar International Friendship Tournament is an association football competition. In its 10th year, it was held in Doha, Qatar during 3–8 March 2012.

The edition reverted to featuring youth teams as opposed to the 9th edition that featured senior teams. Four teams were represented in the tournament. The tournament was won by Greece.

== Participating nations ==
- China
- Greece
- Qatar
- United Arab Emirates

== Matches ==
=== Round robin tournament ===
Team	Pts	Pld	W	D	L	GF	GA	GD
Greece	7	3	2	1	0	5	2	+3
Qatar	6	3	2	0	1	5	2	+3
China	3	3	1	0	2	2	3	–1
United Arab Emirates	1	3	0	1	2	2	7	–5

2012-03-03
16:00 UTC+3

Qatar	3–0	United Arab Emirates
Huthaifa 9'; Hassan 28'; Saleh Bader 42'

Grand Hamad Stadium

2012-03-03
18:15 UTC+3

Greece	1–0	China
Goniadis 59'

Grand Hamad Stadium
Referee: Abdulrahman Abdou (Qatar)

2012-03-05
16:00 UTC+3

United Arab Emirates	2–2	Greece
Ahmed Barman 52'; Ahmed Khamis 90+3' (pen.)		Antonis Ranos 50', 58'

Grand Hamad Stadium
Referee: Khamis Al Marri (Qatar)

2012-03-05
18:15 UTC+3

Qatar	2–0	China
Sultan Bakhit 60'; Huthaifa 64' (pen.); Abdullah Mohammed (red card); Ali Assadalla (red card)

Grand Hamad Stadium
Referee: Ahmed Al Kaaf (Oman)

2012-03-08
16:00 UTC+3

United Arab Emirates	0–2	China
		Luo Senwen 52'; Chen Hao 62'

Grand Hamad Stadium
Referee: Fahad Jaber (Qatar)

2012-03-08
18:15 UTC+3

Qatar	0–2	Greece
		Goniadis 10'; Kaimakamoudis 45'

Grand Hamad Stadium
Referee: Falah Abid Saad (Iraq)

== Winner ==
10th International Friendship Tournament champion

Greece
1st title
