= 2008 AFC U-19 Championship =

بطولة آسيا تحت 19 سنة لكرة القدم 2008

Tournament details
- Host country: Saudi Arabia
- Dates: 31 October – 14 November
- Teams: 16 (from 1 confederation)
- Venues: 2 (in 2 host cities)

Final positions
- Champions: United Arab Emirates (1st title)
- Runners-up: Uzbekistan

Tournament statistics
- Matches played: 31
- Goals scored: 86 (2.77 per match)
- Top scorer(s): (United Arab Emirates) Ahmed Khalil (Japan) Kensuke Nagai (4 goals each)
- Best player: (United Arab Emirates) Ahmed Khalil

The 2008 AFC U-19 Championship the 35th edition of this tournament organized by the Asian Football Confederation (AFC), was hosted by Saudi Arabia between 31 October and 14 November. The matches were played in Dammam and Khobar, both located at the Eastern Province.

== Seedings ==
Pot 1	Pot 2	Pot 3	Pot 4
North Korea; Japan; South Korea; Jordan	China; Iraq; Saudi Arabia (hosts); Australia	Iran; Thailand; United Arab Emirates; Tajikistan	Syria; Uzbekistan; Yemen; Lebanon

== Draw ==
The draw was held on 6 April 2008 in Dammam, Saudi Arabia.

== Venues ==
Dammam	Khobar
Prince Mohamed bin Fahd Stadium	Prince Saud bin Jalawi Stadium
Capacity: 26,000	Capacity: 15,000

== Group stage ==
All times are local (UTC+3).

=== Group A ===
Team	Pld	W	D	L	GF	GA	GD	Pts
Japan	3	2	1	0	10	3	+7	7
Saudi Arabia	3	2	1	0	7	3	+4	7
Iran	3	1	0	2	5	6	−1	3
Yemen	3	0	0	3	1	11	−10	0

31 October 2008
16:15

Japan	5–0	Yemen
Mizunuma 12', 53'; Nagai 32'; Yamamoto 52'; Suzuki 55'	Report

Prince Mohamed bin Fahd Stadium, Dammam
Attendance: 5,000
Referee: Tayeb Shamsuzzaman (Bangladesh)

31 October 2008
18:45

Saudi Arabia	2–1	Iran
Abusabaan 9' (pen.); Al-Abid 87'	Report	Hajsafi 35' (pen.)

Prince Mohamed bin Fahd Stadium, Dammam
Attendance: 8,000
Referee: Ben Williams (Australia)

2 November 2008
16:15

Yemen	1–4	Saudi Arabia
Mousa 31'	Report	Al Abed 11'; Jezawi 47', 85'; Khudari 83'

Prince Mohamed bin Fahd Stadium, Dammam
Attendance: 6,000
Referee: Valentin Kovalenko (Uzbekistan)

2 November 2008
18:45

Iran	2–4	Japan
Hajsafi 20'; Mousavi 26'	Report	Miyazawa 1'; Nagai 7', 33', 77'

Prince Mohamed bin Fahd Stadium, Dammam
Attendance: 1,000
Referee: Fareed Ali Mohamed (United Arab Emirates)

4 November 2008
16:15

Japan	1–1	Saudi Arabia
Mizunuma 65'	Report	Al-Qarni 57'

Prince Mohamed bin Fahd Stadium, Dammam
Attendance: 7,000
Referee: Tan Hai (China)

4 November 2008
16:15

Iran	2–0	Yemen
Mousavi 19'; Ali-Mohammadi 90+1'	Report

Prince Saud bin Jalawi Stadium, Khobar
Attendance: 35
Referee: Kim Dong-Jin (South Korea)

=== Group B ===
Team	Pld	W	D	L	GF	GA	GD	Pts
United Arab Emirates	3	3	0	0	6	2	+4	9
South Korea	3	2	0	1	4	2	+2	6
Iraq	3	1	0	2	3	5	−2	3
Syria	3	0	0	3	1	5	−4	0

31 October 2008
16:15

South Korea	1–0	Syria
Kim Young-Gwon 90+3'	Report

Prince Saud bin Jalawi Stadium, Khobar
Attendance: 750
Referee: Hedayat Mombeini (Iran)

31 October 2008
18:45

Iraq	1–2	United Arab Emirates
Oudah 84'	Report	Al-Kamali 65'; Fawzi 75'

Prince Saud bin Jalawi Stadium, Khobar
Attendance: 300
Referee: Abdulrahman Abdou (Qatar)

2 November 2008
16:15

Syria	1–2	Iraq
Al-Somah 87'	Report	Oudah 51', 61'

Prince Saud bin Jalawi Stadium, Khobar
Attendance: 300
Referee: Tan Hai (China)

2 November 2008
18:45

United Arab Emirates	2–1	South Korea
Khalil 90+2'; Fardan 90+3'	Report	Kim Dong-Sub 28'

Prince Saud bin Jalawi Stadium, Khobar
Attendance: 300
Referee: Ben Williams (Australia)

4 November 2008
18:45

Syria	0–2	United Arab Emirates
	Report	Al-Kamali 54'; Fawzi 90'

Prince Saud bin Jalawi Stadium, Khobar
Attendance: 150
Referee: Hiroyoshi Takayama (Japan)

4 November 2008
18:45

South Korea	2–0	Iraq
Kim Bo-Kyung 23'; Moon Ki-Han 87'	Report

Prince Mohamed bin Fahd Stadium, Dammam
Attendance: 400
Referee: Valentin Kovalenko (Uzbekistan)

=== Group C ===
Team	Pld	W	D	L	GF	GA	GD	Pts
China	3	2	1	0	9	1	+8	7
North Korea	3	1	2	0	5	1	+4	5
Tajikistan	3	1	1	1	6	8	−2	4
Lebanon	3	0	0	3	2	12	−10	0

1 November 2008
16:15 AST

North Korea	4–0	Lebanon
An Il-Bom 15'; Jo Jong-Chol 32'; Ri Sang-Chol 64'; Ri Hyong-Mu 90'	Report

Prince Mohamed bin Fahd Stadium, Dammam
Attendance: 50
Referee: Mahmood Al-Ghatrifi (Oman)

1 November 2008
18:45 AST

China	6–0	Tajikistan
Vasiev 19' (o.g.); Zhou Liao 21', 33'; Zhang Yuan 28'; Cao Yunding 41'; Piao Cheng 45'	Report

Prince Mohamed bin Fahd Stadium, Dammam
Attendance: 200
Referee: Mukhtar Al Yarimi (Yemen)

3 November 2008
16:15 AST

Lebanon	1–3	China
Mannaa 45+2'	Report	Tan Yang 58'; Hui Jiakang 64'; Zhou Liao 90+1'

Prince Mohamed bin Fahd Stadium, Dammam
Attendance: 150
Referee: Tayeb Shamsuzzaman (Bangladesh)

3 November 2008
18:45 AST

Tajikistan	1–1	North Korea
Shohzukhurov 58'	Report	An Il-Bom 90+1'

Prince Mohamed bin Fahd Stadium, Dammam
Attendance: 300
Referee: Hedayat Mombeini (Iran)

5 November 2008
16:15 AST

North Korea	0–0	China
	Report

Prince Mohamed bin Fahd Stadium, Dammam
Attendance: 100
Referee: Abdulrahman Abdou (Qatar)

5 November 2008
16:15 AST

Tajikistan	5–1	Lebanon
Tokhirov 11'; Shohzukhurov 54' (pen.), 90+4' (pen.); Tukhtasunov 55'; Vasiev 83'	Report	Zreik 42'

Prince Saud bin Jalawi Stadium, Khobar
Attendance: 200
Referee: Mahmood Al-Ghatrifi (Oman)

=== Group D ===
Team	Pld	W	D	L	GF	GA	GD	Pts
Australia	3	2	1	0	4	2	+2	7
Uzbekistan	3	2	1	0	3	1	+2	7
Thailand	3	1	0	2	3	4	−1	3
Jordan	3	0	0	3	3	6	−3	0

1 November 2008
16:15 AST

Jordan	0–1	Uzbekistan
	Report	Mirzaev 3'

Prince Saud bin Jalawi Stadium, Khobar
Attendance: 300
Referee: Hiroyoshi Takayama (Japan)

1 November 2008
18:45 AST

Australia	1–0	Thailand
Munro 20'	Report

Prince Saud bin Jalawi Stadium, Khobar
Attendance: 150
Referee: Kim Dong-Jin (South Korea)

3 November 2008
16:15 AST

Uzbekistan	1–1	Australia
Karimov 37'	Report	Minniecon 48'

Prince Saud bin Jalawi Stadium, Khobar
Attendance: 250
Referee: Mahmood Al-Ghatrifi (Oman)

3 November 2008
18:45 AST

Thailand	3–2	Jordan
Namuangrak 28'; Srichaluang 63'; Nooprom 65'	Report	Abu Hwaiti 80'; Al-Rawashdeh 87'

Prince Saud bin Jalawi Stadium, Khobar
Attendance: 100
Referee: Mukhtar Al Yarimi (Yemen)

5 November 2008
18:45 AST

Thailand	0–1	Uzbekistan
	Report	Musaev 34'

Prince Saud bin Jalawi Stadium, Khobar
Attendance: 300
Referee: Fareed Ali Mohamed (United Arab Emirates)

5 November 2008
18:45 AST

Jordan	1–2	Australia
Bani Attiah 81'	Report	Lujic 40'; Ryall 71' (pen.)

Prince Mohamed bin Fahd Stadium, Dammam
Attendance: 150
Referee: Hedayat Mombeini (Iran)

== Knockout stage ==
Quarter-finals
8 November - Dammam
Japan	0
South Korea	3
8 November - Khobar
China	0 (3)
Uzbekistan (p)	0 (4)
8 November - Dammam
United Arab Emirates	1
Saudi Arabia	0
8 November - Khobar
Australia (a.e.t.)	2
North Korea	1

Semi-finals
11 November - Dammam
South Korea	0
Uzbekistan	1
11 November - Dammam
United Arab Emirates	3
Australia	0

Final
14 November - Dammam
Uzbekistan	1
United Arab Emirates	2

=== Quarterfinal ===
8 November 2008
16:15

Japan	0–3	South Korea
	Report	Yu Ji-No 21'; Cho Young-Cheol 84'; Choi Jung-Han 90+2'

Prince Mohamed bin Fahd Stadium, Dammam
Attendance: 500
Referee: Fareed Ali Mohamed (United Arab Emirates)

8 November 2008
19:30 AST

United Arab Emirates	1–0	Saudi Arabia
Awana 64'	Report

Prince Mohamed bin Fahd Stadium, Dammam
Attendance: 8,000
Referee: Abdulrahman Abdou (Qatar)

8 November 2008
16:15

China	0–0 (a.e.t.)	Uzbekistan
	Report
Penalties
Piao Cheng (penalty scored); Zhang Linpeng (penalty scored); Wu Xi (penalty missed); Zhou Liao (penalty scored); Li Zhichao (penalty missed)	3–4	(penalty scored) Azamov; (penalty scored) Karimov; (penalty scored) Tuhtahujaev; (penalty missed) Shikov; (penalty scored) Urunov

Prince Saud bin Jalawi Stadium, Khobar
Referee: Ben Williams (Australia)

8 November 2008
19:30

Australia	2–1 (a.e.t.)	North Korea
Nichols 12', 115'	Report	Myong Cha-Hyon 54'

Prince Saud bin Jalawi Stadium, Khobar
Attendance: 50
Referee: Valentin Kovalenko (Uzbekistan)

=== Semifinal ===
11 November 2008
16:05

South Korea	0–1	Uzbekistan
	Report	Karimov 17'

Prince Mohamed bin Fahd Stadium, Dammam
Attendance: 300
Referee: Hedayat Mombeini (Iran)

11 November 2008
19:30

United Arab Emirates	3–0	Australia
Khalil 4'; Eisa 12'; Haikal 85'	Report

Prince Mohamed bin Fahd Stadium, Dammam
Attendance: 1,000
Referee: Hiroyoshi Takayama (Japan)

=== Final ===
14 November 2008
18:45

Uzbekistan	1–2	United Arab Emirates
Turaev 64'	Report	Khalil 33', 72'

Prince Mohamed bin Fahd Stadium, Dammam
Attendance: 14,500
Referee: Tan Hai (China)

== Winners ==
2008 AFC U-19 Championship winners

United Arab Emirates
First title

== Qualified to the 2009 FIFA U-20 World Cup ==
- United Arab Emirates
- Uzbekistan
- South Korea
- Australia

== Awards ==
Most Valuable Player	Top Scorer	Fair Play Award
(United Arab Emirates) Ahmed Khalil	(United Arab Emirates) Ahmed Khalil (Japan) Kensuke Nagai	Uzbekistan

== Goalscorers ==
4 goals

- (United Arab Emirates) Ahmed Khalil
- (Japan) Kensuke Nagai

3 goals

- (China) Zhou Liao
- (Iraq) Ali Oudah
- (Japan) Kota Mizunuma
- (Tajikistan) Samad Shohzukhurov

2 goals

- (Uzbekistan) Sherzod Karimov
- (Australia) Mitch Nichols
- (Saudi Arabia) Nawaf Al-Abid
- (Saudi Arabia) Abdulrahim Jaizawi
- (Iran) Ehsan Hajsafi
- (Iran) Iman Mousavi
- (North Korea) An Il-Bom
- (United Arab Emirates) Mohamed Fawzi
- (United Arab Emirates) Hamdan Al Kamali

1 goal

- (Australia) Milos Lujic
- (Australia) Sebastian Ryall
- (Australia) Sam Munro
- (Australia) Tahj Minniecon
- (China) Cao Yunding
- (China) Hui Jiakang
- (China) Piao Cheng
- (China) Tan Yang
- (China) Zhang Yuan
- (Iran) Jalaleddin Ali-Mohammadi
- (Japan) Kosuke Yamamoto
- (Japan) Jun Suzuki
- (Japan) Hiroki Miyazawa
- (Jordan) Amer Abu Hwaiti
- (Jordan) Yusuf Al-Rawashdeh
- (Jordan) Khalil Bani Attiah
- (South Korea) Yu Ji-No
- (South Korea) Choi Jung-Han
- (South Korea) Cho Young-Cheol
- (South Korea) Kim Young-Gwon
- (South Korea) Kim Dong-Sub
- (South Korea) Kim Bo-Kyung
- (South Korea) Moon Ki-Han
- (Saudi Arabia) Mohammed Abusabaan
- (Saudi Arabia) Omar Khudari
- (Saudi Arabia) Mohammed Al-Qarni
- (Lebanon) Kassem Mannaa
- (Lebanon) Ahmad Zreik
- (North Korea) Jo Jong-Chol
- (North Korea) Ri Sang-Chol
- (North Korea) Ri Hyong-Mu
- (North Korea) Myong Cha-Hyon
- (Syria) Omar Al Soma
- (Tajikistan) Davrondzhon Tukhtasunov
- (Tajikistan) Farkhod Tokhirov
- (Tajikistan) Farkhod Vasiev
- (Thailand) Yodrak Namueangrak
- (Thailand) Anusorn Srichaloung
- (Thailand) Attapong Nooprom
- (United Arab Emirates) Theyab Awana
- (United Arab Emirates) Rashed Eisa
- (United Arab Emirates) Habib Fardan
- (United Arab Emirates) Abdulaziz Haikal
- (Uzbekistan) Davron Mirzaev
- (Uzbekistan) Fozil Musaev
- (Uzbekistan) Kenja Turaev
- (Yemen) Abdullah Mousa

Own goal

- (Tajikistan) Farkhod Vasiev (playing against China)
