= Abdullah Mohammed =

Abdullah Mohammed may refer to:

- Abdulla Mohamed, Maldivian judge
- Abdullah Mohammed (footballer, born 1992)
- Abdullah Mohammed (footballer, born 1995)
- Abdalla Mohamed, Egyptian handballer
- Abdallah Ali Mohamed, Comorian footballer
- Abdallah Mohamed, Comorian politician
