= Ryohei Yamazaki =

Japanese footballer (born 1989)

Ryōhei Yamazaki 山崎 亮平
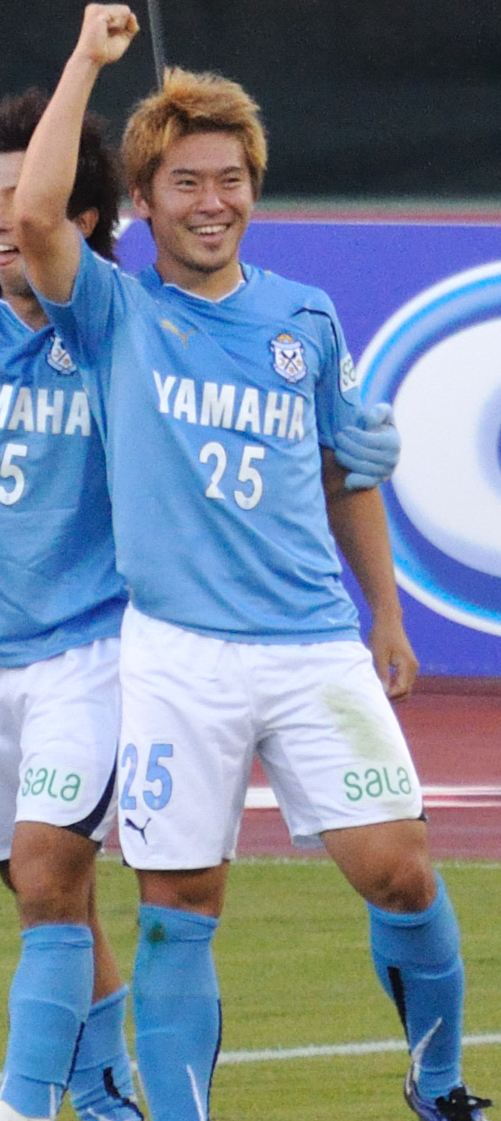

Personal information
- Full name: Ryōhei Yamazaki
- Date of birth: 14 March 1989 (age 37)
- Place of birth: Minamiuonuma, Niigata, Japan
- Height: 1.71 m (5 ft 7 in)
- Positions: Striker; winger

Youth career
- 2004–2006: Yachiyo High School

Senior career*
Years	Team	Apps	(Gls)
2007–2014	Júbilo Iwata	115	(18)
2015–2017	Albirex Niigata	92	(9)
2018–2020	Kashiwa Reysol	20	(0)
2021–2023	V-Varen Nagasaki	52	(4)
2023-2024	Tegevajaro Miyazaki	34	(4)
2024-2025	Tochigi City FC	8	(2)
Total		321	(37)

International career^{‡}
2007–2008	Japan U-19	10	(9)
2010–2012	Japan U-23	16	(3)
Medal record
Júbilo Iwata
Winner	J.League Cup	2010
Representing Japan
Asian Games
Gold medal – first place	2010 Guangzhou	Team
- * Club domestic league appearances and goals ‡ National team caps and goals as of 23 June 2011

Ryōhei Yamazaki (山崎 亮平, Yamazaki Ryōhei; born 14 March 1989) is a Japanese former footballer who played as a forward, most notably for Júbilo Iwata, Albirex Niigata and Kashiwa Reysol. He is also an Asian Games Gold Medallist.

== Club career ==
Early Career (Jubilo Iwata)

Ryōhei Yamazaki began his professional career in March 2007 where he played forward for Jubilo Iwata in the J1 League (Japanese 1st division football) where he spent 8 season (the longest of all his clubs) and won the Japanese league cup final in 2010 where he scored a goal on the 104th minute in extra time to secure his team's 5-3 victory, In the cup he scored 2 goals in 5 appearances, tiring for top scorer. This was Jubilo Iwata's first cup win since 2001. Jubilo Iwata got relegated in 2014.

Mid Career (2015-2021)

In January 2015 he signed for Albirex Niigata. Scoring 15 goals in 107 appearances for the club, he had a short 3 year run there and didn't win any trophies. In January 2018 he went and signed for Kashiwa Reysol where he scored only 1 goal in the 27 matches he played there. Kashiwa Reysol ended up getting relegated down to the J2 league where they won the J2 League title and won back promotion just after being in the J2 league for 1 season.

Late Career (2021-2024)

After 2 mores seasons at Kashiwa Reysol in the J1 League, in January 2021 Ryōhei Yamazaki left to J2 League team, V-Varen Nagasaki on a free transfer. He had more success in goals at this club as he scored 5 goals in 57 matches, often playing as a forward or winger. Just after 2 years he transferred to Tegevajaro Miyazaki on a free transfer in January 2023 where he scored 4 goals in 35 appearances.

Last Year (2024-2025)

It wasn't long before he had changed clubs again, as only 1 year later, in January 2024 he transferred on a free transfer to Tochigi City FC where he only appeared in 9 matches scoring 2 goals. He contributed to their championship winning season where they were promoted to the J3 League. On 1 January 2025 he announced his retirement at just 35 years old, putting a end to his 18 season long career. Over his professional club career he scored 58 goals in 382 matches with clubs.

== International career ==
=== 2010 Asian Games ===
On 23 September 2010, Yamazaki was selected for the Japan Under 21 squad for the 2010 Asian Games held in Guangzhou, China PR.

== Career statistics ==
=== Club ===
Appearances and goals by club, season and competition
Club	Season	League			National cup (Note: Includes Emperor's Cup)		League cup (Note: Includes J.League Cup)		Continental		Other		Total	
Club	Season	Division	Apps	Goals	Apps	Goals	Apps	Goals	Apps	Goals	Apps	Goals	Apps	Goals
Júbilo Iwata	2007	J.League Division 1	0	0	0	0	1	0	–		0	0	1	0
Júbilo Iwata	2008	J.League Division 1	6	0	0	0	1	0	–		0	0	7	0
Júbilo Iwata	2009	J.League Division 1	0	0	0	0	0	0	–		0	0	0	0
Júbilo Iwata	2010	J.League Division 1	4	0	2	0	5	2	–		0	0	11	2
Júbilo Iwata	2011	J.League Division 1	19	4	2	0	4	1	–		0	0	25	5
Júbilo Iwata	2012	J.League Division 1	26	2	3	2	3	1	–		0	0	32	5
Júbilo Iwata	2013	J.League Division 1	21	4	1	1	4	3	–		0	0	26	8
Júbilo Iwata	2014	J.League Division 2	39	8	2	2	0	0	–		1 (Note: Appearance in J1/J2 play-offs)	1	42	11
Júbilo Iwata	Total		115	18	10	5	18	7	0	0	1	1	144	31
Albirex Niigata	2015	J1 League	33	5	0	0	9	4	–		–		42	9
Albirex Niigata	2016	J1 League	28	2	1	1	4	1	–		–		33	4
Albirex Niigata	2017	J1 League	31	2	0	0	2	0	–		–		33	2
Albirex Niigata	Total		92	9	1	1	15	5	0	0	0	0	108	15
Kashiwa Reysol	2018	J1 League	17	0	2	0	3	1	2 (Note: Appearances in AFC Champions League)	0	–		24	1
Kashiwa Reysol	2019	J2 League	2	0	0	0	1	0	0	0	–		3	0
Kashiwa Reysol	2020	J1 League	1	0	0	0	1	0	0	0	–		2	0
Kashiwa Reysol	Total		20	0	2	0	5	1	2	0	0	0	29	1
V-Varen Nagasaki	2021	J2 League	20	0	2	0	–		–		–		22	0
V-Varen Nagasaki	2022	J2 League	32	4	3	1	–		–		–		35	5
V-Varen Nagasaki	Total		52	4	5	1	0	0	0	0	0	0	57	5
Tegevajaro Miyazaki	2023	J3 League	34	4	1	0	–		–		–		35	4
Tochigi City	2024	JFL	8	2	1	0	–		–		–		9	2
Career total			321	37	20	7	38	13	2	0	1	1	382	58

=== International ===
As of 23 June 2011

National team	Year	Apps	Goals
Japan U19	2007	5	5
Japan U19	2008	5	4
Japan U19	Total	10	9
Japan U22	2010	9	2
Japan U22	2011	7	1
Japan U22	Total	16	3

International appearances and goals
#	Date	Venue	Opponent	Result	Goal	Competition
2007
	6 November	Suphachalasai Stadium, Bangkok	Chinese Taipei U18	3–1	1	2008 AFC Youth Championship qualification / Japan U18
	8 November	Suphachalasai Stadium, Bangkok	Maldives U18	1–0	0	2008 AFC Youth Championship qualification / Japan U18
	12 November	Suphachalasai Stadium, Bangkok	Myanmar U18	8–0	2	2008 AFC Youth Championship qualification / Japan U18
	14 November	Suphachalasai Stadium, Bangkok	Laos U18	5–0	1	2008 AFC Youth Championship qualification / Japan U18
	18 November	Thai Japanese Stadium, Bangkok	Thailand U18	3–2	1	2008 AFC Youth Championship qualification / Japan U18
2008
	21 January	Qatar SC Stadium, Doha	Egypt U19	3–0	0	2008 Qatar International Friendship Tournament / Japan U19
	23 January	Qatar SC Stadium, Doha	Germany U19	4–2	1	2008 Qatar International Friendship Tournament / Japan U19
	25 January	Qatar SC Stadium, Doha	Poland U19	0–1	0	2008 Qatar International Friendship Tournament / Japan U19
	28 January	Qatar SC Stadium, Doha	China PR U19	2–1	0	2008 Qatar International Friendship Tournament / Japan U19
	30 January	Qatar SC Stadium, Doha	Poland U19	6–1	3	2008 Qatar International Friendship Tournament / Japan U19
2010
	18 May	Stade du Ray, Nice	Ivory Coast U21	0–3	0	2010 Toulon Tournament / Japan U21
	20 May	Stade Perruc, Hyères	France U21	1–4	0	2010 Toulon Tournament / Japan U21
	22 May	Le Grand Stade, Le Lavandou	Colombia U21	0–3	0	2010 Toulon Tournament / Japan U21
	8 November	Tianhe Stadium, Guangzhou	China U21	3–0	1	2010 Asian Games / Japan U21
	10 November	Huadu Stadium, Guangzhou	Malaysia U23	2–0	0	2010 Asian Games / Japan U21
	16 November	Huangpu Sports Center, Guangzhou	India U21	5–0	1	2010 Asian Games / Japan U21
	19 November	Huangpu Sports Center, Guangzhou	Thailand U23	1–0	0	2010 Asian Games / Japan U21
	23 November	Yuexiushan Stadium, Guangzhou	Iran U23	2–1	0	2010 Asian Games / Japan U21
	25 November	Tianhe Stadium, Guangzhou	United Arab Emirates U23	1–0	0	2010 Asian Games / Japan U21
2011
	9 February	Mohammed Al-Hamad Stadium, Hawalli	Kuwait	0–3	0	Friendly / Japan U22
	12 February	Bahrain National Stadium, Manama	Bahrain U22	2–0	1	Friendly / Japan U22
	26 March	Pakhtakor Markaziy Stadium, Tashkent	Uzbekistan U22	0–1	0	Friendly / Japan U22
	29 March	JAR Stadium, Tashkent	Uzbekistan U22	2–1	0	Friendly / Japan U22
	1 June	Niigata Stadium, Niigata	Australia U22	3–1	0	Friendly / Japan U22
	19 June	Toyota Stadium, Toyota	Kuwait U22	3–1	0	2012 Summer Olympics qualification / Japan U22
	23 June	Mohammed Al-Hamad Stadium, Hawalli	Kuwait U22	1–2	0	2012 Summer Olympics qualification / Japan U22

== Awards and honours ==
=== League ===
- J.League: 2010
- J2 League: 2019
- Japan Football League: 2024

=== Japan ===
- Asian Games : 2010
