= Kensuke Nagai =

Japanese footballer

Kensuke Nagai 永井 謙佑
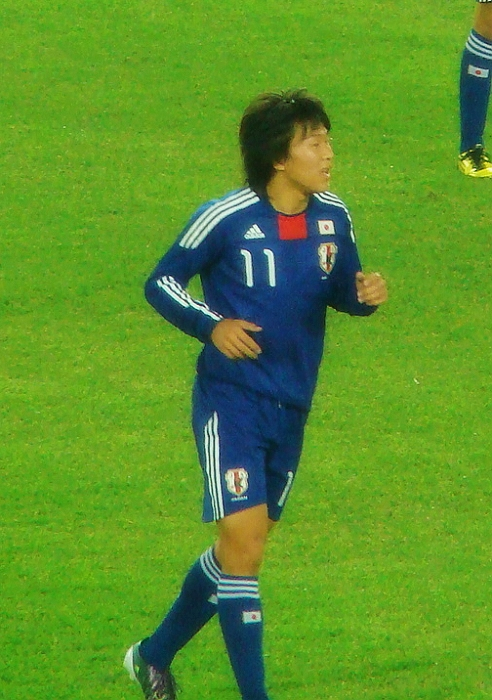

Personal information
- Full name: Kensuke Nagai
- Date of birth: 5 March 1989 (age 37)
- Place of birth: Fukuyama, Hiroshima, Japan
- Height: 1.77 m (5 ft 9 1/2 in)
- Position: Striker

Team information
- Current team: Nagoya Grampus
- Number: 18

Youth career
- 1994–1997: Cariru Tênis Clube
- 1998–2000: Iseigaoka SSS
- 2001–2003: Asakawa Junior High School
- 2004–2006: Kyushu IU High School

College career
Years	Team	Apps	(Gls)
2007–2010	Fukuoka University		

Senior career*
Years	Team	Apps	(Gls)
2009	Avispa Fukuoka	5	(0)
2010	Vissel Kobe	3	(0)
2011–2012	Nagoya Grampus	57	(13)
2013–2014	Standard Liège	3	(0)
2013–2014	→ Nagoya Grampus (loan)	42	(12)
2015–2016	Nagoya Grampus	62	(17)
2017–2022	FC Tokyo	179	(21)
2022–	Nagoya Grampus	128	(19)

International career^{‡}
2007–2008	Japan U-18	3	(1)
2008	Japan U-19	3	(4)
2009–2011	Japan U-20	5	(1)
2009–2012	Japan U-23	31	(13)
2010–2019	Japan	12	(3)
Medal record
Nagoya Grampus
Runner-up	J1 League	2011
Representing Japan
Asian Games
Gold medal – first place	2010 Guangzhou	Team
- * Club domestic league appearances and goals as of 12 August 2026 ‡ National team caps and goals as of 19 November 2019

Kensuke Nagai (永井 謙佑, Nagai Kensuke; born 5 March 1989) is a Japanese football player who plays as a striker for J1 League club Nagoya Grampus.

== Career ==
From the age of 3, Nagai spent five years in Ipatinga, Brazil, where he started playing street football with his childhood friends.

After moving back from Brazil to Kitakyushu, Fukuoka, he played soccer at local elementary and junior high school clubs, before joining the Kyushu International University High School club, where he played two matches in the 85th All Japan High School Soccer Tournament.

He joined the Fukuoka University club in April 2007 and won the 33rd Prime Minister's Cup All Japan College Soccer Tournament in 2009.

While playing for the Fukuoka University Club, Nagai also played for Avispa Fukuoka in J. League Division 2 in 2009 and Vissel Kobe in 2010 as a J.League designated special player.

On 23 December 2009, he was named in the squad for Japan's 2011 AFC Asian Cup qualification against Yemen, and made his full international debut for the team in the fixture on 6 January 2010.

He was selected as a member of Japanese squad for the 2012 Olympics.

He was transferred from Nagoya to Standard Liège of Belgian Pro League in January 2013, but was loaned back to Nagoya from August 2013 to June 2014, due to limited playing opportunities at Standard Liège. In January 2015, the loan deal was terminated, and Nagai returned to Nagoya on a permanent basis.

== Career statistics ==
=== Club ===
As of 8 December 2024.

Club	Season	League		Cup (Note: Emperor's Cup and Belgian Cup)		League Cup (Note: J. League Cup)		Continental (Note: AFC Champions League)		Other^{4}		Total	
Club	Season	Apps	Goals	Apps	Goals	Apps	Goals	Apps	Goals	Apps	Goals	Apps	Goals
Fukuoka University	2009	-		1	0	-		-		-		1	0
Avispa Fukuoka	2009	5	0	-		-		-		-		5	0
Vissel Kobe	2010	3	0	-		-		-		-		3	0
Nagoya Grampus	2011	27	3	4	2	2	2	7	2	-		40	9
Nagoya Grampus	2012	30	10	3	2	0	0	7	1	-		40	13
Standard Liège	2012–13	11	0	-		-		-		-		11	0
Standard Liège	2013–14	0	0	-		-		1	0	-		1	0
Nagoya Grampus	2013	14	0	1	0	-		-		-		15	0
Nagoya Grampus	2014	28	12	4	6	6	1	-		-		38	19
Nagoya Grampus	2015	31	10	-		4	1	-		-		35	11
Nagoya Grampus	2016	31	7	3	0	-		-		-		34	7
FC Tokyo	2017	30	1	1	0	8	1	-		-		39	2
FC Tokyo	2018	32	5	2	0	2	0	-		-		36	5
FC Tokyo	2019	33	9	2	0	4	1	-		-		39	10
FC Tokyo	2020	26	4	-		3	0	4	1	-		33	5
FC Tokyo	2021	38	2	1	1	10	2	-		-		49	5
FC Tokyo	2022	20	0	2	0	1	0	-		-		23	0
Nagoya Grampus	2022	13	4	-		2	0	-		-		15	4
Nagoya Grampus	2023	33	4	3	0	7	2	-		-		43	6
Nagoya Grampus	2024	34	6	-		8	3	-		-		42	9
Career total		439	77	24	12	60	13	19	4	0	0	542	106

=== International ===
As of 19 November 2019

National team	Year	Apps	Goals
Japan U18
Japan U18	2007	3	1
Japan U19
Japan U19	2008	3	4
Japan U20
Japan U20	2009	5	1
Japan U23
Japan U23	2009	3	1
Japan U23	2010	6	5
Japan U23	2011	10	4
Japan U23	2012	12	3
Japan U23	Total	21	9
Japan
Japan	2010	1	0
Japan	2011	0	0
Japan	2012	0	0
Japan	2013	0	0
Japan	2014	0	0
Japan	2015	5	0
Japan	2016	0	0
Japan	2017	0	0
Japan	2018	0	0
Japan	2019	6	3
Japan	Total	12	3

International appearances and goals
#	Date	Venue	Opponent	Result	Goal	Competition
2007
	12 November	Suphachalasai Stadium, Bangkok	Myanmar U18	8–0	1	2008 AFC Youth Championship qualification / Japan U18
	14 November	Suphachalasai Stadium, Bangkok	Laos U18	5–0	0	2008 AFC Youth Championship qualification / Japan U18
	18 November	Thai Japanese Stadium, Bangkok	Thailand U18	3–2	0	2008 AFC Youth Championship qualification / Japan U18
2008
	31 October	Prince Mohamed bin Fahd Stadium, Dammam	Yemen U19	5–0	1	2008 AFC U-19 Championship / Japan U19
	2 November	Prince Mohamed bin Fahd Stadium, Dammam	Iran U19	4–2	3	2008 AFC U-19 Championship / Japan U19
	8 November	Prince Mohamed bin Fahd Stadium, Dammam	South Korea U19	0–3	0	2008 AFC U-19 Championship / Japan U19
2009
	11 January	Qatar SC Stadium, Doha	Syria U20	0–1	0	2009 Qatar International Friendship Tournament / Japan U20
	13 January	Qatar SC Stadium, Doha	United Arab Emirates U20	1–1	1	2009 Qatar International Friendship Tournament / Japan U20
	15 January	Qatar SC Stadium, Doha	Serbia U20	3–2	0	2009 Qatar International Friendship Tournament / Japan U20
	18 January	Qatar SC Stadium, Doha	Uzbekistan U20	2–3	0	2009 Qatar International Friendship Tournament / Japan U20
	20 January	Qatar SC Stadium, Doha	Qatar U20	3–1	0	2009 Qatar International Friendship Tournament / Japan U20
	2 December	Siu Sai Wan Sports Ground, Hong Kong	North Korea U23	2–1	0	2009 East Asian Games / Japan U23
	10 December	Hong Kong Stadium, Hong Kong	South Korea U23	2–1	1	2009 East Asian Games / Japan U23
	12 December	Hong Kong Stadium, Hong Kong	Hong Kong U23	1–1	0	2009 East Asian Games / Japan U23
2010
1.	6 January	Ali Muhesen Stadium, Sana'a	Yemen	3–2	0	2011 AFC Asian Cup qualification
	8 November	Tianhe Stadium, Guangzhou	China U23	3–0	1	2010 Asian Games / Japan U23
	10 November	Huadu Stadium, Guangzhou	Malaysia U23	2–0	1	2010 Asian Games / Japan U23
	16 November	Huangpu Sports Center, Guangzhou	India U23	5–0	2	2010 Asian Games / Japan U23
	19 November	Huangpu Sports Center, Guangzhou	Thailand U23	1–0	0	2010 Asian Games / Japan U23
	23 November	Yuexiushan Stadium, Guangzhou	Iran U23	2–1	1	2010 Asian Games / Japan U23
	25 November	Tianhe Stadium, Guangzhou	United Arab Emirates U23	1–0	0	2010 Asian Games / Japan U23
2011
	9 February	Mohammed Al-Hamad Stadium, Hawalli	Kuwait	0–3	0	Friendly / Japan U22
	12 February	Bahrain National Stadium, Manama	Bahrain U22	2–0	0	Friendly / Japan U22
	26 March	Pakhtakor Markaziy Stadium, Tashkent	Uzbekistan U22	0–1	0	Friendly / Japan U22
	29 March	JAR Stadium, Tashkent	Uzbekistan U22	2–1	1	Friendly / Japan U22
	1 June	Niigata Stadium, Niigata	Australia U22	3–1	2	Friendly / Japan U22
	23 June	Mohammed Al-Hamad Stadium, Hawalli	Kuwait U22	1–2	0	2012 Summer Olympics qualification / Japan U22
	10 August	Sapporo Dome, Sapporo	Egypt U22	2–1	1	Friendly / Japan U22
	21 September	Tosu Stadium, Tosu	Malaysia U22	2–0	0	2012 Summer Olympics qualification / Japan U22
	22 November	Bahrain National Stadium, Manama	Bahrain U22	2–0	0	2012 Summer Olympics qualification / Japan U22
	27 November	National Olympic Stadium, Tokyo	Syria U22	2–1	0	2012 Summer Olympics qualification / Japan U22
2012
	5 February	King Fahd International Stadium, Riyadh	Syria U23	1–2	1	2012 Summer Olympics qualification / Japan U23
	22 February	National Stadium, Bukit Jalil	Malaysia U23	4–0	0	2012 Summer Olympics qualification / Japan U23
	14 March	National Olympic Stadium, Tokyo	Bahrain U23	2–0	0	2012 Summer Olympics qualification / Japan U23
	11 July	National Olympic Stadium, Tokyo	New Zealand U23 (Olympic)	1–1	0	Friendly / Japan U23 (Olympic)
	18 July	City Ground, West Bridgford	Belarus U23 (Olympic)	1–0	0	Friendly / Japan U23 (Olympic)
	21 July	City Ground, West Bridgford	Mexico U23 (Olympic)	2–1	0	Friendly / Japan U23 (Olympic)
	26 July	Hampden Park, Glasgow	Spain U23 (Olympic)	1–0	0	2012 Summer Olympics / Japan U23 (Olympic)
	29 July	St James' Park, Newcastle	Morocco U23 (Olympic)	1–0	1	2012 Summer Olympics / Japan U23 (Olympic)
	1 August	Ricoh Arena, Coventry	Honduras U23 (Olympic)	0–0	0	2012 Summer Olympics / Japan U23 (Olympic)
	4 August	Old Trafford, Manchester	Egypt U23 (Olympic)	3–0	1	2012 Summer Olympics / Japan U23 (Olympic)
	7 August	Wembley Stadium, London	Mexico U23 (Olympic)	1–3	0	2012 Summer Olympics / Japan U23 (Olympic)
	10 August	Millennium Stadium, Cardiff	South Korea U23 (Olympic)	0–2	0	2012 Summer Olympics / Japan U23 (Olympic)

=== International goals ===
Scores and results list Japan's goal tally first.

No.	Date	Venue	Opponent	Score	Result	Competition
1.	9 June 2019	Hitomebore Stadium Miyagi, Rifu, Japan	El Salvador	1–0	2–0	2019 Kirin Challenge Cup
2.	9 June 2019	Hitomebore Stadium Miyagi, Rifu, Japan	El Salvador	2–0	2–0	2019 Kirin Challenge Cup
3.	10 October 2019	Saitama Stadium 2002, Saitama, Japan	Mongolia	4–0	6–0	2022 FIFA World Cup qualification

== Honours ==
=== Japan ===
- Asian Games : 2010

=== Club ===
Nagoya Grampus

- J.League Cup: 2024
- Japanese Super Cup : 2011

FC Tokyo

- J.League Cup : 2020

=== Individual ===
- AFC U-19 Championship Top scorers : 2008
- Summer Universiade Top scorers : 2009
- Asian Games Top scorers : 2010
- J.League Best XI: 2019
