= Kento Shiratani =

Japanese footballer

Personal information
- Date of birth: June 10, 1989 (age 37)
- Place of birth: Kyoto, Japan
- Height: 1.77 m (5 ft 9 1/2 in)
- Position: Forward

Senior career*
Years	Team	Apps	(Gls)
2008–2009	Cerezo Osaka	12	(0)
2010	Mito HollyHock	4	(0)
2010–2011	Fagiano Okayama	30	(7)
2012–2013	Roasso Kumamoto	15	(0)
2013–2014	FC Machida Zelvia	6	(0)
Total		67	(7)
- * Club domestic league appearances and goals

Kento Shiratani (白谷 建人, Shiratani Kento; born June 10, 1989) is a former Japanese football player.

== Club statistics ==
Club performance			League		Cup		Total	
Season	Club	League	Apps	Goals	Apps	Goals	Apps	Goals
Japan			League		Emperor's Cup		Total	
2008	Cerezo Osaka	J2 League	11	0	1	0	12	0
2009	Cerezo Osaka	J2 League	1	0	1	0	2	0
2010	Mito HollyHock	J2 League	4	0	0	0	4	0
2010	Fagiano Okayama	J2 League	18	4	0	0	18	4
2011	Fagiano Okayama	J2 League	12	3	0	0	12	3
2012	Roasso Kumamoto	J2 League	13	0	0	0	13	0
2013	Roasso Kumamoto	J2 League	2	0	0	0	2	0
2013	FC Machida Zelvia	Football League						
2014	FC Machida Zelvia	J3 League						
Country	Japan							
Total								

== National team statistics ==
=== Appearances in major competitions ===
Team	Competition	Category	Appearances		Goals	Team record
Team	Competition	Category	Start	Sub	Goals	Team record
Japan	AFC Youth Championship 2008 qualification	U-18	3	2	3	Qualified
