= Maksim Belyh =

Turkmen footballer (born 1984)

Personal information
- Full name: Maxim Valyeryevich Belyh
- Date of birth: 7 August 1984 (age 42)
- Place of birth: Ashkhabad, Turkmen SSR, USSR (now Ashgabat, Turkmenistan)
- Height: 1.80 m (5 ft 11 in)
- Position: Defender

Team information
- Current team: Ozgon (fitness coach)

Senior career*
Years	Team	Apps	(Gls)
2004–2005	HTTU Aşgabat		
2006	FC Pakhtakor	3	(0)
2007–2008	HTTU Aşgabat		
2009	Navbahor Namangan	6	(0)
2010	FC Balkan		
2011	HTTU Aşgabat		
2012	Navbahor Namangan	5	(0)
2013–2014	FC Ahal		
2015	FC Şagadam		
2018	FC Ahal		

International career
2008–2011	Turkmenistan	13	(1)

Managerial career
- 2017–2019: FC Ahal (assistant)
- 2019–2020: Turkmenistan (soccer) (assistant)
- 2020: Turkmenistan (futsal) (physical coach)
- 2020: Qizilqum (assistant)
- 2022: Kaganat (assistant)
- 2025–: Ozgon ( fitness coach )
- 2025–: Turkmenistan (soccer) (assistant)
- * Club domestic league appearances and goals

Maksim Walerýewiç Belyh (Turkmen pronunciation: [mɑkˈθɪm beˈɫɯχ]; Russian: Максим Вальерьевич Белых; born 7 August 1984) is a Turkmen former professional football player, currently working as fitness coach in FC Ozgon.

== Club career ==
Maksim Belyh began his active career in professional football with the HTTU Aşgabat club in 2004. In 2005, he was loaned to Nisa, one of the leading teams in the Ýokary Liga.

In 2006, he played for Uzbek club Pakhtakor, under the management of Turkmen coach Täçmyrat Agamyradow, for a certain period.

In 2009 and 2012, Belyh played for the Uzbek club Navbahor.

At the end of the 2014 season, Belyh left from FC Ahal. In 2015, he played for Şagadam FK.

The last club of his professional career was FC Ahal.

In 2022–2023, he played for the football team Major in the Istrinsky District Football Championship and the Istrinsky District Football Cup in Russia.

=== Futsal ===
He participated in the 2021/22 Istrinsky District Futsal Cup, playing for the Temp team.

He played for the team Plamya in the 2022/23 Istrinsky District Futsal Premier League.

He played 13 matches for the team Major (40+) in the 2023/24 Istrinsky District Futsal Championship for Veteran Teams (40+). The same year he played 3 matches for the team Major (40+) in the 2023/24 Istrinsky District Futsal Cup for Veteran Teams (40+).

== International career ==
He made his senior debut for Turkmenistan in 2010 FIFA World Cup qualification (AFC) match against Jordan on 23 March 2008.

He played for the Turkmenistan Olympic team at the 2010 Asian Games in Guangzhou.

== Coaching career ==
Maksim Belyh holds an AFC B coaching license.

From 2017 to 2019, he worked as an assistant coach at FC Ahal.

In May 2019, he entered the coaching staff of the Turkmenistan national football team under the leadership of Ante Miše. In 2020, he took a position of physical coach in the Turkmenistan national futsal team.

In 2022, Belykh joined the coaching staff of the Kyrgyz Premier League club Kaganat.

In January 2025, Belykh became the fitness coach for the Kyrgyz Premier League club FC Ozgon.

== Personal life ==
Maksim Belyh was born on August 7, 1984, in Ashgabat. Belyh is an ethnic Russian.

In 2001, he graduated from Secondary School No. 1 in Ashgabat.

He is married and has a daughter and a son.
