= Amer Abu Hwaiti =

Jordanian footballer

Personal information
- Full name: Amer Abdel-Karim Radhi Abu Hwaiti
- Date of birth: 23 February 1989 (age 37)
- Place of birth: Amman, Jordan
- Position: Striker

Youth career
- 2004–2008: Al-Wehdat

Senior career*
Years	Team	Apps	(Gls)
2008–2014	Al-Wehdat		
2013–2014	→ Manshia Bani Hassan (loan)		
2014–2015	Sahab		
2015–2016	Ittihad Al-Ramtha		
2016–2017	Sahab		
2017–2018	Al-Tura		

International career
2007–2008	Jordan U19		(3)
2009–2011	Jordan U23		(1)
- * Club domestic league appearances and goals

Amer Abdel-Karim Radhi Abu Hwaiti is a retired Jordanian footballer.

== International goals ==
=== U-19 ===
#	Date	Venue	Opponent	Score	Result	Competition
1	6 November 2007	Tashkent	Nepal	2–0	Win	2008 AFC Youth Championship qualification
2	15 October 2008	Zarqa	Iraq	1–1	Draw	U-19 Friendly
3	3 November 2008	Khobar	Thailand	2–3	Loss	2008 AFC U-19 Championship

=== U-23 ===
#	Date	Venue	Opponent	Score	Result	Competition
1	24 November 2009	Amman	Palestine	2–1	Loss	U-23 Friendly
