= Anusorn Srichaluang =

Thai footballer (born 1989)

Personal information
- Full name: Anusorn Srichaluang
- Date of birth: October 8, 1989 (age 37)
- Place of birth: Surin, Thailand
- Height: 1.72 m (5 ft 7 1/2 in)
- Position: Striker

Team information
- Current team: Pluakdaeng United
- Number: 11

Youth career
- 2005–2006: Bangkok Bank

Senior career*
Years	Team	Apps	(Gls)
2007–2008	Bangkok Bank	22	(4)
2009–2010	Muangthong United	8	(0)
2010	→ TTM Phichit (loan)	13	(1)
2011	Police United	2	(0)
2011	Army United	2	(0)
2012	Yasothon	4	(1)
2013	Nakhon Ratchasima	0	(0)
2013	→ Royal Thai Navy (loan)	1	(0)
2014	Phitsanulok	6	(0)
2015–2017	Samut Sakhon	19	(4)
2017–2020	MOF Customs United	18	(1)
2020	Pluakdaeng United	10	(1)
2021	Nakhon Mae Sot United	12	(0)
2022	Kasem Bundit University	8	(2)
2022–	Pluakdaeng United	18	(4)

International career
2007–2008	Thailand U19	15	(8)
- * Club domestic league appearances and goals as of 18 March 2023

Anusorn Srichaluang (Thai: อนุสรณ์ ศรีชาหลวง, born October 8, 1989) is a Thai professional footballer who currently plays for Pluakdaeng United in the Thai League 3.

== International career ==
Anusorn played for Thailand U19, and played in the 2008 AFC U-19 Championship.

== International goals ==
=== Under-19 ===
#	Date	Venue	Opponent	Score	Result	Competition
1.	3 November 2008	Prince Saud bin Jalawi Stadium, Khobar, Saudi Arabia	Jordan	2-0	3-2	2008 AFC U-19 Championship

== Honours ==
=== Club ===
Muangthong United

- Thai Premier League Champions (1) : 2009
