= Huthaifa Al Salemi =

Qatari footballer (born 1994)

Personal information
- Full name: Huthaifa Yahya Nasser Al Salemi
- Date of birth: 7 February 1994 (age 32)
- Place of birth: Qatar
- Position: Midfielder

Senior career*
Years	Team	Apps	(Gls)
2012–2018	Al-Gharafa		
2016–2017	→ Muaither (loan)		
2017–2018	→ Al Kharaitiyat (loan)		
- * Club domestic league appearances and goals

Huthaifa Al Salemi (Arabic: حذيفة السالمي; born 7 February 1994) is a Qatari footballer.
