= Mohammad Abadi =

Syrian footballer (born 1990)

Mohammad Abadi محمد عبادي
Personal information
- Full name: Mohammad Khair Abadi
- Date of birth: 3 September 1990 (age 36)
- Place of birth: Deir ez-Zor, Syria
- Height: 1.69 m (5 ft 7 in)
- Position: Forward

Team information
- Current team: Al Futowa

Youth career
- Al Futowa

Senior career*
Years	Team	Apps	(Gls)
2008–2010	Al Futowa		
2010–2013	Al-Shorta		
2014–	Al Futowa		

International career^{‡}
2005–2007	Syria U-17		
2008	Syria U-20		
2009–2011	Syria U-23		
2008–2012	Syria	4	(1)
- * Club domestic league appearances and goals as of 12 November 2011 ‡ National team caps and goals as of 12 November 2011

Mohammad Abadi (Arabic: محمد عبادي; born 3 September 1990) is a Syrian footballer for Al Futowa.
