= Mohammed Mohammed =

Nigerian diplomat

Mohammed Mohammed is a Nigerian diplomat and civil servant who was appointed as the Director General of the National Intelligence Agency (NIA) by President Tinubu Ahmed of Nigeria on 26 August 2024.
