= Hamdan Al-Kamali =

Emirati footballer (born 1989)

Hamdan al-Kamali
Personal information
- Full name: Hamdan Ismael Mohammed Al Kamali
- Date of birth: 2 May 1989 (age 37)
- Place of birth: Abu Dhabi, United Arab Emirates
- Height: 1.83 m (6 ft 0 in)
- Position: Centre back

Youth career
- 1996–2007: Al Wahda

Senior career*
Years	Team	Apps	(Gls)
2006–2020	Al Wahda	154	(16)
2011–2012	→ Lyon II (loan)	8	(1)
2011–2012	→ Lyon (loan)	0	(0)
2020–2024	Shabab Al-Ahli	27	(1)
2023–2024	→ Al-Nasr (loan)	19	(0)
2024–2025	Dibba Al-Hisn	19	(0)

International career
2006–2009	United Arab Emirates U20	52	(5)
2008–2019	United Arab Emirates	53	(5)
- * Club domestic league appearances and goals

Hamdan Ismael Al-Kamali (Arabic: حمدان إسماعيل محمد الكمالي; born 2 May 1989) was an Emirati footballer who played as a central defender former the UAE national team. He was part of the United Arab Emirates football team at the 2012 Summer Olympics.

== Club career ==
=== Al Wahda ===
Al Kamali began his career with Al Wahda at the age of seven, where he played in the club's youth teams, a physical education teacher at his school was impressed with his talent, who took him to the Al Wahda club in Bani Yas, where he attracted the attention of the Egyptian coach Abdel Fattah coach of the youth teams at that time, Al Wahda signed him after selection by the coach Abdel Fattah. In the 2006–07 season, Al Kamali become a first team player. He made his official debut for the first-team on 12 November 2006 in a 0–1 loss to Al Jazira at the Vice Presidents Cup, where he was sent off after a foul on Toni.

Al Kamali was listed as one of the best 100 young players in the world by the respected Spanish football Magazine 'Don Balon'. He also attracted interest from Lyon; only to have Al Wahda reject the French team's bid for him.

=== Olympique Lyonnais ===
After a long time of negotiations he was officially introduced by the Lyon president Jean-Michel Aulas on 28 January 2012, on a 6-month loan with the option of permanent switch.

== Career statistics ==
=== Club ===
As of 2 September 2011

Club	Season	League			Cup			Super Cup			President Cup			Vice President Cup			Champions League			Club World Cup			Total		
Club	Season	Apps	Goals	Assists	Apps	Goals	Assists	Apps	Goals	Assists	Apps	Goals	Assists	Apps	Goals	Assists	Apps	Goals	Assists	Apps	Goals	Assists	Apps	Goals	Assists
Al Wahda	2006–07	0	0	0	0	0	0	—			0	0	0	1	0	0	0	0	0	—			1	0	0
Al Wahda	2007–08	0	0	0	0	0	0	—			0	0	0	—			0	0	0	—			0	0	0
Al Wahda	2008–09	0	0	0	0	0	0	—			0	0	0	—			0	0	0	—			0	0	0
Al Wahda	2009–10	15	1	0	1	0	0	—			0	0	0	—			0	0	0	—			16	1	0
Al Wahda	2010–11	19	2	0	0	0	0	1	0	0	0	0	0	—			0	0	0	3	0	0	23	2	0
Al Wahda	2011–12	6	1	0	0	0	0	0	0	0	0	0	0	—			0	0	0	—			6	1	0
Career totals		40	4	0	1	0	0	1	0	0	0	0	0	1	0	0	0	0	0	3	0	0	46	4	0

=== International ===
As of 14 November 2012

United Arab Emirates national team
Year	Apps	Goals
2008	1	0
2009	9	0
2010	5	0
2011	11	3
2012	7	2
2013	8	0
2014	4	0
2015	2	0
2016	4	0
2017	1	0
Total	52	5

Hamdan Al Kamali: International goals – U20
#	Date	Venue	Opponent	Score	Result	Competition
1.	24 October 2007	Home	Kuwait	5–1	Win	AFC Youth Championship 2008 qualification
2.	30 October 2007	Away	Iraq	2–1	Win	AFC Youth Championship 2008 qualification
3.	31 October 2008	Prince Saud bin Jalawi Stadium, Khobar	Iraq	2–1	Win	AFC Youth Championship 2008
4.	30 November 2008	Prince Saud bin Jalawi Stadium, Khobar	Syria	2–0	Win	AFC Youth Championship 2008
5.	27 September 2009	Alexandria Stadium, Alexandria	South Africa	2–2	Drew	2009 FIFA U-20 World Cup
Hamdan Al Kamali: International goals – U23
1.	7 October 2010	Sheikh Khalifa International Stadium, Al Ain	Egypt	3–0	Win	Friendly
2.	2 November 2010	Huadu Stadium, Guangzhou	China	1–1	Drew	Friendly
3.	16 November 2010	Tianhe Stadium, Guangzhou	Kuwait	2–0	Win	2010 Asian Games
Source: Al Kamali Goals

=== International goals ===
Scores and results list the United Arab Emirates' goal tally first.

No	Date	Venue	Opponent	Score	Result	Competition
1.	17 July 2011	Sheikh Khalifa International Stadium, Al Ain, United Arab Emirates	Lebanon	4–1	6–2	Friendly
2.	23 July 2011	Sheikh Khalifa International Stadium, Al Ain, United Arab Emirates	India	1–0	3–0	2014 FIFA World Cup qualification
3.	25 August 2011	Tahnoun bin Mohammed Stadium, Al Ain, United Arab Emirates	Qatar	1–0	3–1	Friendly
4.	16 October 2012	Zayed Sports City Stadium, Abu Dhabi, United Arab Emirates	Bahrain	3–2	6–2	Friendly
5.	14 November 2012	Zayed Sports City Stadium, Abu Dhabi, United Arab Emirates	Estonia	1–0	2–1	Friendly

== Honours ==
=== Club ===
Al Wahda

- Pro-League: 1

2009–10

=== UAE ===
- AFC U-19 Championship: 1

2008

- GCC U-23 Championship: 1

2010

- Asian Games Silver Medal: 1

2010

- Arabian Gulf Cup: 1

2013

- AFC Asian Cup third place: 1

2015
