= Theyab Awana =

Emirati footballer (1990–2011)

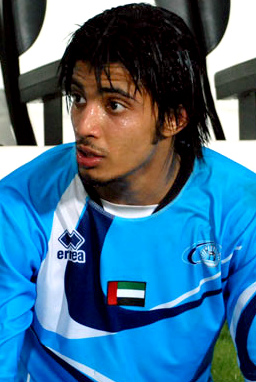
- Awana with Baniyas in 2009

Personal information
- Full name: Theyab Awana Ahmed Husain Al Messabi
- Date of birth: 8 April 1990
- Place of birth: Abu Dhabi, United Arab Emirates
- Date of death: 25 September 2011 (aged 21)
- Place of death: Abu Dhabi, United Arab Emirates
- Height: 1.74 m (5 ft 9 in)
- Position: Winger

Youth career
- 1999–2007: Baniyas

Senior career*
Years	Team	Apps	(Gls)
2007–2011	Baniyas	62	(8)
Total		62	(8)

International career
2004–2007	United Arab Emirates U17		
2007–2009	United Arab Emirates U20		
2010–2011	United Arab Emirates U23		
2009–2011	United Arab Emirates	9	(3)
Medal record
Representing United Arab Emirates
Men's football
Silver medal – second place	Guangzhou 2010	Squad
- * Club domestic league appearances and goals

Theyab Awana Ahmed Husain Al Messabi (Arabic: ذياب عوانة أحمد حسين المصعبي; 8 April 1990 – 25 September 2011) was an Emirati professional footballer who played as a winger for UAE Pro League club Baniyas and the United Arab Emirates national team. His playing style and ability drew comparisons to former Emirati international Zuhair Bakhit.

== International career ==
=== Youth ===
Theyab played for the United Arab Emirates (UAE) in the first match of the 2009 FIFA U-20 World Cup against South Africa. 2–0 down in the 90th minute of play, Hamdan Al Kamali converted a penalty to make the score 2–1 in the first minute of stoppage time; Theyab scored from a cross from Ahmed Ali to snatch a last-minute equaliser before the final whistle a few seconds later.

=== Senior ===
Theyab was brought to worldwide fame for the penalty kick scored with a back-heel in a friendly match against Lebanon on 17 July 2011. In the 78th minute, with the score at 5–2, a penalty was given to the UAE. Theyab took the penalty and, halfway through his path to the ball, he turned around and kicked the ball into the goal with his right heel. The coach reacted badly on the effort, and Theyab was immediately subbed off for the bad reception he received for the penalty. The incident was brought to prominence after a video of the kick was put on YouTube, which currently has over 2,800,000 views. The match ended 6–2 for the UAE.

== Death and legacy ==
Awana died on 25 September 2011, aged 21, in a car accident in Abu Dhabi. According to reports, his Audi Q7 SUV crashed on the Sheikh Zayed Bridge when he was returning to Abu Dhabi from Al Ain after the end of a training session for the national team. The report stated he was using his phone at the time of the accident. Awana died at the scene. Rumours surfaced that his brother was also with him in the car during the time of the accident and rushed into intensive care before dying several hours later. However, Baniyas Club denied this rumor.

He was buried on 26 September 2011, immediately after the Asr prayer, in the Baniyas Cemetery in Shamkha, Abu Dhabi. A month after Awana's death, the United Arab Emirates Football Association christened a newly built stadium in Dubai the "Theyab Awana Stadium". A mosque in Kuwait was also named after him.

== Career statistics ==
=== Club ===
Appearances and goals by club, season and competition
Club	Season	League			League Cup (Note: Includes the UAE League Cup)		Total	
Club	Season	Division	Apps	Goals	Apps	Goals	Apps	Goals
Baniyas	2007–08	UAE Division 2	10	0	—		10	0
Baniyas	2008–09	UAE Division 2	15	3	—		15	3
Baniyas	2009–10	UAE Pro League	19	3	—		19	3
Baniyas	2010–11	UAE Pro League	18	2	1	0	19	2
Career total			62	8	1	0	63	8

=== International ===
National team	Year	Apps	Goals
United Arab Emirates	2009	3	0
United Arab Emirates	2010	3	1
United Arab Emirates	2011	3	2
Total		9	3

Scores and results list the United Arab Emirates's goal tally first, score column indicates score after each Awana goal.

List of international goals scored by Theyab Awana
No.	Date	Venue	Opponent	Score	Result	Competition	Ref.
1	7 September 2010	Al Nahyan Stadium, Abu Dhabi, United Arab Emirates	Kuwait	1–0	3–0	Friendly	
2	2 January 2011	Zayed Sports City Stadium, Abu Dhabi, United Arab Emirates	Syria	2–0	2–0	Friendly	
3	17 July 2011	Khalifa bin Zayed Stadium, Al Ain, United Arab Emirates	Lebanon	1–0	6–2	Friendly	

== Honours ==
Baniyas

- UAE Division 2 Group A: 2008–09

United Arab Emitates U17

- GCC U-17 Championship: 2006

United Arab Emirates U19

- AFC U-19 Championship: 2008

United Arab Emirates U23

- GCC U-23 Championship: 2010
- Asian Games silver medal: 2010
