= Kohei Higa =

Japanese footballer

Personal information
- Full name: Kohei Higa
- Date of birth: 30 April 1990 (age 36)
- Place of birth: Saitama, Japan
- Height: 1.65 m (5 ft 5 in)
- Position: Midfielder

Senior career*
Years	Team	Apps	(Gls)
2009–2010	Kashiwa Reysol	1	(0)
2011	Blaublitz Akita	30	(7)
2012–2016	Montedio Yamagata	44	(4)
Medal record
Montedio Yamagata
Runner-up	Emperor's Cup	2014
Representing Japan
AFC U-16 Championship
Gold medal – first place	2006 Singapore
- * Club domestic league appearances and goals as of 1 March 2015

Kohei Higa (比嘉 厚平, Higa Kōhei; born 30 April 1990) is a Japanese football player.

== Career statistics ==
Appearances and goals by club, season and competition
Club	Season	League			Emperor's Cup		J.League Cup		Total	
Club	Season	Division	Apps	Goals	Apps	Goals	Apps	Goals	Apps	Goals
Kashiwa Reysol	2009	J. League 1	1	0	0	0	0	0	1	0
Kashiwa Reysol	2010	J. League 2	0	0	0	0	—		0	0
Blaublitz Akita	JFL	2011	30	7	2	2	—		32	9
Montedio Yamagata	2012	J. League 2	10	0	1	0	0	0	11	0
Montedio Yamagata	2013	J. League 2	18	2	0	0	—		18	2
Montedio Yamagata	2014	J. League 2	16	2	1	0	—		17	2
Montedio Yamagata	2015	J. League 1	0	0	0	0	0	0	0	0
Career total			75	11	4	2	0	0	79	13
