= Abdullah Mohammed (footballer, born 1995) =

Emirati association football player

Abdullah Mohammed عبد الله محمد
Personal information
- Full name: Abdullah Mohammed Hassan Ibrahim
- Date of birth: 3 February 1995 (age 31)
- Place of birth: Emirates
- Height: 1.84 m (6 ft 0 in)
- Position: Goalkeeper

Youth career
- 2008–2015: Al-Shabab

Senior career*
Years	Team	Apps	(Gls)
2015–2017	Al-Shabab	1	(0)
2017–2018	Al-Dhafra	0	(0)
2018–2019	Al Dhaid		
2020–2021	Dibba Al-Fujairah		
2021–2022	Masfout		
- * Club domestic league appearances and goals

Abdullah Mohammed Hassan (Arabic:عبد الله محمد حسن) (born 3 February 1995) is an Emirati footballer who plays as a goalkeeper.

== Career ==
=== Al-Shabab ===
Abdullah Mohammed started his career at Al-Shabab and is a product of the Al-Shabab's youth system. On 13 May 2017, made his professional debut for Al-Shabab against Al-Wahda in the Pro League .

=== Al Dhafra ===
On 28 July 2017 left Al-Shabab and signed with Al-Dhafra .

=== Al Dhaid ===
On Season 2018, left Al-Dhafra and signed with Al Dhaid.
