= Harmoko (footballer) =

Indonesian footballer

Personal information
- Date of birth: 6 March 1989 (age 37)
- Place of birth: Dampit, Malang Regency, Indonesia
- Height: 1.72 m (5 ft 7 1/2 in)
- Position: Striker

Youth career
- SSB Kaki Mas Dampit
- 2006–2007: Persema Malang
- 2008: PON Jawa Timur

Senior career*
Years	Team	Apps	(Gls)
2008–2010	Persema Malang	29	(7)
2010–2011	Persekam Metro	18	(7)
2011–2012	Persiwa Wamena	10	(0)
2012–2016	Perseta Tulungagung	72	(11)

International career
2007	Indonesia U-19	3	(1)
- * Club domestic league appearances and goals as of 26 April 2013

Harmoko (born March 6, 1989) is an Indonesian former footballer.

== Club career statistics ==
As of 26 April 2013.

Club performance			League		Cup		League Cup		Total	
Season	Club	League	Apps	Goals	Apps	Goals	Apps	Goals	Apps	Goals
Indonesia			League		Piala Indonesia		League Cup		Total	
2008–09	Persema Malang	Premier Division	22	7	4	1	-		26	8
2009–10	Persema Malang	Super League	7	0	1	0	-		8	0
2010–11	Persekam Metro	Premier Division	18	7	-		-		18	7
2011–12	Persiwa Wamena	Super League	10	0	-		-		10	0
2012–13	Perseta Tulungagung	Premier Division	?	1	-		-		?	1
Total	Indonesia		57	15	5	1	-		62	16
Career total			57	15	5	1	-		62	16
