= 9th International Friendship Tournament =

Tournament details
- Host country: Qatar
- Dates: 27 December – 2 January
- Teams: 4 (from 2 confederations)
- Venue(s): 1 (in 1 host city)

Final positions
- Champions: (North Korea) Korea DPR (1st title)
- Runners-up: Qatar
- Third place: Mali
- Fourth place: Iran

Tournament statistics
- Matches played: 6
- Goals scored: 11 (1.83 per match)
- Top scorer(s): (Qatar) Magid Mohamed (North Korea) Choe Kum-chol (2 goals each)

The 9th Qatar International Friendship Tournament was held in Doha, Qatar from 27 December 2009 to 2 January 2010. This edition featured senior national teams for the first time and also reverted to four teams from eight in previous editions.

The total prize money for the tournament was $600,000, of which $250,000 was allocated for the winner. Korea DPR won the tournament after Qatar was held to a goalless draw with Mali in the final match.

== Participating nations ==
- Qatar
- Iran
- (North Korea) Korea DPR
- Mali

== Matches ==
=== Round robin tournament ===
Team	Pts	Pld	W	D	L	GF	GA	GD
North Korea	6	3	2	0	1	2	1	+1
Qatar	4	3	1	1	1	3	3	0
Mali	4	3	1	1	1	2	2	0
Iran	3	3	1	0	2	4	5	–1

27 December 2009
14:30 UTC+7

Mali	0–1	North Korea
		Choe Kum-chol 54'

Jassim Bin Hamad Stadium

27 December 2009
14:30 UTC+7

Qatar	3–2	Iran
Ali Afif 6'; Magid Mohamed 10', 90+2'		Milad Meydavoudi 38'; Ehsan Hajsafi 47'

Jassim Bin Hamad Stadium

30 December 2009
13:00 UTC+7

Iran	1–2	Mali
Karim Ansarifard 12'		Tenema N'Diaye 29'; Dramane Traoré 31'

Jassim Bin Hamad Stadium

30 December 2009
15:15 UTC+7

Qatar	0–1	North Korea
		Choe Kum-chol 59'

Jassim Bin Hamad Stadium

2 January 2010
13:00 UTC+7

Qatar	0–0	Mali

Jassim Bin Hamad Stadium

2 January 2010
15:15 UTC+7

North Korea	0–1	Iran
		Mehrzad Madanchi 42'

Jassim Bin Hamad Stadium

== Winner ==
9th International Friendship Tournament champion

North Korea
1st title
