= Abdulla Ibrahim =

Officer of the Maldives National Defence Force

Brigadier General Abdulla Ibrahim is a staff officer of Maldives National Defence Force and the commandant of Maldives Presidential Guard (PG).

Abdulla Ibrahim held commands in Maldives National Defence Force including the Commander Coast Guard Services, Commanding officer of Maldives Fire and Rescue Services, Commanding Officer of the Southern Region, Commanding Officer of the Central Region and Commanding Officer of Rapid Reaction Forces Maldives.
