= Mohamed Fawzi (footballer) =

Emirati footballer (born 1990)

Mohammed Fawzi
Personal information
- Full name: Mohamed Fawzi Johar Farag Abdulla
- Date of birth: 22 February 1990 (age 36)
- Place of birth: Kalba
- Height: 1.78 m (5 ft 10 in)
- Position: Right back

Youth career
- 2003–2007: Ittihad Kalba

Senior career*
Years	Team	Apps	(Gls)
2006–2007	Ittihad Kalba		
2007–2010	Al-Ahli	1	(0)
2010–2014	Baniyas	82	(8)
2014–2016	Al Ain	26	(2)
2016–2020	Al Jazira	69	(2)
2020–2023	Al Nasr	49	(0)
2024–2025	Al Arabi		

International career^{‡}
2006–2008	United Arab Emirates U17	0	(1)
2008–2009	United Arab Emirates U20	40	(3)
2010–2013	United Arab Emirates U23	7	(2)
2011–	United Arab Emirates	33	(0)
- * Club domestic league appearances and goals as of 1 October 2011 (UTC) ‡ National team caps and goals as of 29 August 2017(UTC)

Mohammed Fawzi Johar Farag Abdulla (Arabic: محمد فوزي جوهر فرج عبدالله; born 22 February 1990) is an Emirati footballer who plays as a right back. He appeared at the 2012 Summer Olympics.

== Career statistics ==
=== Club ===
Club	Season	League			Cup^{2}			Asia^{1}			Total		
Club	Season	Apps	Goals	Assists	Apps	Goals	Assists	Apps	Goals	Assists	Apps	Goals	Assists
Al-Ahli	2009–10	0	0	0	0	0	0	0	0	0	0	0	0
Al-Ahli	Total	0	0	0	0	0	0	0	0	0	0	0	0
Career totals		0	0	0	0	0	0	0	0	0	0	0	0

^{1}Continental competitions include the AFC Champions League
^{2}Other tournaments include the UAE President Cup and Etisalat Emirates Cup

=== National team ===
As of 27 September 2009

Team	Season	Cup^{2}			Asia^{1}			Total		
Team	Season	Apps	Goals4	Assists	Apps	Goals5	Assists	Apps	Goals77	Assists
UAE U20	2009	5	0	0	0	0	0	0	0	0
UAE U20	Total	0	0	0	0	0	0	0	0	0
Career totals		0	0	0	0	0	0	0	0	0

== Honours ==
United Arab Emirates

- Arabian Gulf Cup: 2013
- AFC Asian Cup third-place: 2015
- AFC U-19 Championship: 2008
