= Antonis Ranos =

Greek footballer

Personal information
- Full name: Antonios Ranos
- Date of birth: 15 June 1993 (age 33)
- Place of birth: Xanthi, Greece
- Height: 1.84 m (6 ft 0 in)
- Position: Forward

Team information
- Current team: Ethnikos Achna

Youth career
- Xanthi

Senior career*
Years	Team	Apps	(Gls)
2012–2017	Xanthi	71	(4)
2016	→ Aris Limassol (loan)	16	(8)
2017–2018	Sparta	23	(3)
2018–2020	Anagennisi Deryneia	43	(25)
2020–2022	ASIL Lysi	30	(16)
2022–	Ethnikos Achna	13	(2)

International career
2012	Greece U19	3	(2)
2013	Greece U20	6	(0)
- * Club domestic league appearances and goals as of 31 May 2023

Antonis Ranos (Greek: Αντώνης Ράνος; born 15 June 1993) is a Greek professional footballer who plays as a forward for Cypriot club Ethnikos Achna.

== Career ==
After graduating with Skoda Xanthi, Ranos was promoted to first team in 2012 summer. On 30 September, he made his first team debut, in a 2–3 away defeat against Platanias. On 2 February 2013, he scored his first professional goal, in a 2–0 home win against Platanias.
