= Satkhira Day-Night College =

Coordinates: 22.707953°N 89.072618°E

- সাতক্ষীরা দিবা-নৈশ কলেজ
- Type: National university
- Established: 1992
- Principal: Md Sofiquzzaman
- Location: Satkhira, Bangladesh
- Campus: Sultanpur, Satkhira Sadar, Satkhira-9400
- Affiliations: National University
- Website: Official Website

Satkhira Day-Night College is a co-educational college in Satkhira. It was founded 29 August 1992. It was affiliated to the Board of Intermediate and Secondary Education, Jessore on 1 July 1994. Degree affiliation on 1 July 1995 by the National University, Dhaka. Mr. Abdul Motilib is the founder of Satkhira Day-Night College and he is the Editor of The Daily Kafela news paper, Satkhira.
