= Amir Sharafi =

Iranian footballer (born 1989)

Personal information
- Full name: Amir Sharafi
- Date of birth: 25 June 1989 (age 37)
- Place of birth: Ahvaz, Iran
- Height: 1.77 m (5 ft 9 1/2 in)
- Position: Midfielder

Youth career
- –2008: Esteghlal Ahvaz

Senior career*
Years	Team	Apps	(Gls)
2008–2011	Esteghlal Ahvaz	62	(4)
2011–2013	Foolad	13	(0)
2012–2013	→ Hafari Ahvaz (loan)	12	(2)
2013–2014	Iranjavan	21	(0)

International career^{‡}
2010–2011	Iran U-23	9	(1)
- * Club domestic league appearances and goals as of 9 March 2011 (UTC) ‡ National team caps and goals as of 23 February 2011

Amir Sharafi (born 25 June 1989) is an Iranian footballer.

== Club career ==
Sharafi has played most of his professional career on a number of different teams in Iran. He joined the Iranian football scene in 2008, playing several seasons with Esteghlal Ahvaz, before he was transferred to Foolad, a member of the Persian Gulf Pro League, in 2011. Sharafi played only thirteen games with Foolad FC before he was transferred to Iranjavan FC. From there, he bounced around, spending time with Naft Gachsaran FC and Hafari Ahvaz before he joined the squad on Foolad Novin, in 2018, where he continues to play.

== Club Career Statistics ==
Last Update 10 April 2014

Club performance			League		Cup		Continental		Total	
Season	Club	League	Apps	Goals	Apps	Goals	Apps	Goals	Apps	Goals
Iran			League		Hazfi Cup		Asia		Total	
2008–09	Esteghlal; Ahvaz	Pro League	16	1	2	0	-	-	18	2
2009–10	Esteghlal; Ahvaz	Pro League	28	0	1	0	-	-	29	0
2010–11	Esteghlal; Ahvaz	Division 1	18	3	2	2	-	-	20	5
2011–12	Foolad	Pro League	13	0	2	0	-	-	15	0
2012–13	Hafari Ahvaz	Division 1	12	2	1	0	-	-	13	2
2013–14	Iranjavan	Division 1	21	0	0	0	-	-	21	0
Career total			108	6	8	2	0	0	116	8

- Assist Goals

Season	Team	Assists
09–10	Esteghlal Ahvaz	2
11–12	Foolad	0
