= Samad Shohzukhurov =

Tajikistani footballer

Personal information
- Full name: Samad Shohzukhurov
- Date of birth: 8 February 1990 (age 36)
- Position: Midfielder

Team information
- Current team: Barki Tajik

Senior career*
Years	Team	Apps	(Gls)
2005–2010	Dynamo Dushanbe		
2011–2013	Energetik Dushanbe		
2014–2015	Parvoz Bobojon Ghafurov		
2015–2017	Barki Tajik		

International career^{‡}
2006–2007	Tajikistan U17		
2007–2008	Tajikistan	9	(0)
- * Club domestic league appearances and goals as of 28 April 2021 ‡ National team caps and goals as of 28 April 2021

Samad Shohzukhurov (born 8 February 1990) is a Tajikistani footballer who last played for Barki Tajik. He is a member of the Tajikistan national football team in the 2010 FIFA World Cup qualification campaign. He also joined the 2007 FIFA U-17 World Cup held in South Korea.

== Career statistics ==
=== International ===
Tajikistan national team
Year	Apps	Goals
2007	1	0
2008	8	0
Total	9	0

Statistics accurate as of match played 13 August 2008
