= Qatar International Friendship Tournament =

Football tournament held annually in Doha, Qatar

The International Friendship Tournament is a football tournament held annually in Doha, Qatar since 2002. It is now a tournament for youth teams, having been previously contested mainly by countries' Olympic teams.

The first and only edition featuring senior teams was the 2010 edition, which was won by Korea DPR after Qatar was held to a goalless draw with Mali in the final match.

== Champions ==
Year	Champions	Runners-up
2002	Egypt	China
2003	Egypt	Czech Republic
2004	Morocco	(South Korea) Korea Republic
2005	(South Korea) Korea Republic	Japan
2006	Japan	(South Korea) Korea Republic
2007	Egypt	Belarus
2008	Japan	Poland
2009	Syria	Uzbekistan
2010	(North Korea) Korea DPR	Qatar
2012	Greece	Qatar
2013	Iran	Turkey
2023	(South Korea) Korea Republic	United Arab Emirates

== Editions ==
- 2002: Olympic (U-23)
- 2003: Olympic (U-23)
- 2004: Olympic (U-23)
- 2005: Olympic (U-23)
- 2006: U-20
- 2007: Olympic (U-23)
- 2008: U-20
- 2009: U-20
- 2010: Senior
- 2012: U-20
- 2013: Olympic (U-23)
- 2023: Olympic (U-23)
