= Tayeb Shamsuzzaman =

Bangladeshi football referee

Hasan Tayeb Shamsuzzaman
- Full name: Hasan Tayeb Shamsuzzaman
- Born: 9 January 1970 (age 56); East Pakistan

International
Years	League	Role
1999–2016	FIFA	Referee

Hasan Tayeb Shamsuzzaman (born 9 January 1970) is a Bangladeshi football referee who has been a full international referee for FIFA.

Shamsuzzaman became a FIFA referee in 1999. He served as a referee at the 2002, 2010, and 2014 FIFA World Cup qualifiers, in addition to the AFC Champions League and West Asian Football Federation Championship. He also works as a sports teacher at Satkhira Day-Night College.

During his 18-year career, he conducted around 100 international matches. From 1999 until his retirement in 2016, he served as a FIFA referee for about 17 years and was once among the top 25 Asian referees as well. He was a FIFA elite referee for ten consecutive years before retiring.

He takes pride in being the first in South Asia to officiate the final match of the SAFF Championship (2013 Nepal). He remains Bangladesh's first and only International Referee Award recipient (AFC Referees Momento Award). For contributions to the country's sports, Tayeb Shamsuzzaman along with 84 other sportspersons and organisers received the National Sports Award in 2022. Later, he donated a good portion of the cash he received along with the National Award for the underprivileged and undernourished children in his home town.

Notable work

Gianni Infantino, the FIFA boss, congratulated former FIFA referee Tayeb Hasan Shamsuzzaman for stretching his hands towards people in need during the COVID-19 by auctioning off one of his favorite jerseys.

Tayeb wore this priceless jersey while conducting the final of SAFF Championship 2013 in Kathmandu, Nepal.

It was sold for Tk5.55 lakhs, with Satkhira Chamber of Commerce president Nasim Faruk Khan winning the bid in a Facebook auction arranged by Auction 4 Action Saturday.

The FIFA chief wrote a letter to Tayeb to congratulate him, and encourage initiatives with regard to COVID-19.

== Officiating record ==
Round	Home team	Score	Away team	Date
2018 FIFA World Cup qualification (AFC)
Second round	Bhutan	3–4	Maldives	October 8, 2015
2016 AFC U-16 Championship qualification
—	Kuwait U-16	1–0	Afghanistan U-16	September 18, 2015
2015 AFC Cup
Group stage	Istiklol	5–2	Ahal	May 13, 2015
Group stage	South China	3–0	Global FC	April 29, 2015
Group stage	Maziya	2–0	Warriors	March 10, 2015
2014 Asian Games
Group stage	Vietnam Olympic	1–0	Kyrgyzstan Olympic	September 22, 2014
Group stage	Kuwait Olympic	5–0	Nepal Olympic	September 17, 2014
2014 AFC President's Cup
Group stage	Manang Marshyangdi Club	6–3	Svay Rieng	May 1, 2014
2014 AFC Cup
Group stage	Kitchee	4–0	Tampines Rovers	April 8, 2014
Group stage	New Radiant	0–2	Persipura Jayapura	April 2, 2014
Group stage	Kelantan	2–3	Vissai Ninh Binh	March 18, 2014
2014 AFC U-19 Championship qualification
—	Yemen U-19	2–1	Jordan U-19	October 10, 2013
—	Maldives U-19	0–0	Jordan U-19	October 6, 2013
2014 AFC U-16 Championship qualification
—	Iraq U-16	1–2	Bahrain U-16	September 29, 2013
—	Bahrain U-16	8–1	Nepal U-16	September 25, 2013
2013 SAFF Championship
Final	Afghanistan	2–0	India	September 11, 2013
Group stage	Afghanistan	0–0	Maldives	September 6, 2013
Group stage	Bhutan	2–8	Maldives	September 4, 2013
2013 AFC President's Cup
Group stage	Balkan FC	2–0	Boeung Ket Rubber Field	May 8, 2013
2013 AFC Cup
Group stage	Al Shorta (Syria)	0–2	Al Qadsia	April 23, 2013
Group stage	Ayeyawady United	3–0	Maziya	April 10, 2013
Group stage	Al-Ahli Taizz	0–2	Fanja	March 12, 2013
Group stage	East Bengal Club	1–0	Selangor	February 27, 2013
2012 AFF Suzuki Cup
Preliminary round	Laos	3–1	Brunei	October 11, 2012
Preliminary round	Myanmar	2–1	Timor-Leste	October 7, 2012
2014 AFC U-22 Championship qualification
—	Saudi Arabia U-22	4–0	Palestine U-22	June 28, 2012
—	Syria U-22	1–0	Kyrgyzstan U-22	June 23, 2012
2012 AFC Cup
Group stage	Kelantan	1–0	Ayeyawady United	May 8, 2012
Group stage	Al Tilal	0–2	Al Shorta (Syria)	April 11, 2012
Group stage	East Bengal Club	0–1	Al Orouba (Yemen)	March 6, 2012
2012 AFC U-19 Championship qualification
—	(Taiwan) Chinese Taipei U-19	0–6	South Korea U-19	November 7, 2011
—	Thailand U-19	1–0	South Korea U-19	October 31, 2011
International friendly
—	Argentina	3–1	Nigeria	September 6, 2011
2014 FIFA World Cup qualification (AFC)
Second round	Laos	1–6	China	July 28, 2011
First round	Sri Lanka	1–1	Philippines	June 29, 2011
2011 AFC Cup
Group stage	Al Faisaly	0–0	Duhok FC	May 10, 2011
Group stage	Al Talaba	1–1	Al Suwaiq	April 26, 2011
Group stage	Victory SC	1–3	Tampines Rovers	March 2, 2011
2012 AFC Olympic qualification
—	Tajikistan Olympic	1–3	Oman Olympic	March 9, 2011
Preliminary round	India Olympic	2–1	Myanmar Olympic	February 23, 2011
2010 Asian Games
Round of 16	Iran Olympic	3–1	Malaysia Olympic	November 15, 2010
Group stage	South Korea Olympic	4–0	Jordan Olympic	November 10, 2010
Group stage	Vietnam Olympic	3–1	Bahrain Olympic	November 8, 2010
2010 AFC Champions League
Group stage	Persipura Jayapura	2–0	Changchun Yatai	April 28, 2010
Group stage	Henan Jianye	0–2	Suwon Samsung Bluewings	March 23, 2010
2010 AFC Cup
Round of 16	Sriwijaya	1–4	Thai Port	May 12, 2010
Group stage	Al Karama	2–0	Saham	February 23, 2010
2010 AFC U-19 Championship qualification
—	Kyrgyzstan U-19	1–2	Jordan U-19	October 29, 2009
—	Yemen U-19	3–0	Nepal U-19	October 25, 2009
2010 AFC U-16 Championship qualification
—	Kyrgyzstan U-16	3–1	Turkmenistan U-16	October 13, 2009
—	Kyrgyzstan U-16	0–0	India U-16	October 8, 2009
—	India U-16	1–6	Jordan U-16	October 3, 2009
2009 AFC Cup
Quarter-finals	Chonburi FC	2–2	Binh Duong	September 15, 2009
2009 AFC Champions League
Group stage	Tianjin Teda	3–1	Kawasaki Frontale	May 5, 2009
Group stage	Seoul FC	1–1	Shandong Luneng	April 21, 2009
Group stage	Singapore Armed Forces	1–4	Kashima Antlers	April 7, 2009
2011 AFC Asian Cup qualification
—	Uzbekistan	0–1	United Arab Emirates	March 3, 2010
—	Oman	0–0	Indonesia	January 19, 2009
2008 AFC Challenge Cup
Semi-finals	India	1–0	Myanmar	August 7, 2008
Group stage	North Korea	1–0	Myanmar	August 4, 2008
Group stage	Tajikistan	1–1	India	August 1, 2008
2008 AFC President's Cup
Group stage	Ashgabat	0–1	Kanbawza	April 23, 2008
2008 AFC Cup
Group stage	Victory SC	1–1	Kedah DA FA	April 30, 2008
Group stage	Safa SC	1–0	Ahli Sana'a	April 16, 2008
2008 AFC Champions League
Group stage	Saudi Arabia	3–0	Al Ittihad (Syria)	May 21, 2008
Group stage	Chunnam Dragons	3–4	Gamba Osaka	March 19, 2008
2008 AFC U-19 Championship
Final round	Lebanon U-19	1–3	China U-19	November 3, 2008
Final round	Japan U-19	5–0	Yemen U-19	October 31, 2008
Qualification	(Taiwan) Chinese Taipei U-19	1–1	Maldives U-19	November 16, 2007
Qualification	Japan U-19	8–0	Myanmar U-19	November 12, 2007
Qualification	Thailand U-19	3–0	Laos U-19	November 10, 2007
2010 FIFA World Cup qualification (AFC)
Group stage	Nagoya Grampus	0–0	Beijing Guoan	March 17, 2009
—	Jordan	0–1	North Korea	February 6, 2008
—	(Taiwan) Chinese Taipei	0–2	Uzbekistan	October 28, 2007
AFC final round
Final stage	North Korea Olympic	0–0	Iraq Olympic	October 17, 2007
Second round	North Korea Olympic	2–2	Iraq Olympic	March 14, 2007
2007 AFC Champions League
Group stage	Persik Kediri	3–3	Urawa Red Diamonds	May 9, 2007
Group stage	Neftchi Fergana	2–1	Al Karama	March 21, 2007
2007 AFC Asian Cup qualification
—	(Taiwan) Chinese Taipei	0–2	Iran	October 11, 2006
—	Singapore	0–0	China	September 6, 2006
2006 AFC Cup
Quarter-finals	Al Faisaly	1–1	Sun Hei	September 12, 2006
2006 AFC Challenge Cup
Group stage	Pakistan	2–2	Macau	April 6, 2006
Group stage	Kyrgyzstan	0–1	Pakistan	April 2, 2006
2005 AFC President's Cup
Semi-finals	Dordoi-Dynamo	0–0	Three Star Club	May 12, 2005
Group stage	Blue Star	1–8	Dordoi-Dynamo	May 7, 2005
Group stage	Dordoi-Dynamo	6–1	Hello United	May 5, 2005
2002 FIFA World Cup qualification (AFC)
First stage	Cambodia	0–4	China	May 6, 2001

Shamsuzzaman retired from refereeing in 2016.
