= Abdullah Mousa =

Emirati footballer (born 1987)

Personal information
- Full name: Abdullah Mousa Mohamed Ahmed Esmaeil Al Bloushi
- Date of birth: 23 February 1987 (age 39)
- Place of birth: Al Ain, United Arab Emirates
- Height: 1.83 m (6 ft 0 in)
- Position: Defender

Senior career*
Years	Team	Apps	(Gls)
2006–2007	Al Ain	4	(0)
2007–2008	Al Nasr	8	(0)
2008–2018	Al Jazira	19	(4)
2018–2019	Fujairah	0	(0)

International career
2009–2015	United Arab Emirates	12	(1)
- * Club domestic league appearances and goals

Abdullah Mousa, also called Abdulla Al Bloushi (Arabic: عبد الله موسى; born 23 February 1987 in Al Ain, United Arab Emirates) is an Emirati former footballer who played as a defender.

In 2011 AFC Asian Cup in Qatar, he was called to United Arab Emirates national football team. His national football team was eliminated in the group stage.

== Honours ==
United Arab Emirates

- Arabian Gulf Cup: 2013
