= Abdullah Mohammed (footballer, born 1992) =

Emirati footballer

Abdullah Mohammed Mousa Al-Shehhi
Personal information
- Full name: Abdullah Mohammed Mousa Al-Shehhi
- Date of birth: 22 September 1992 (age 34)
- Place of birth: United Arab Emirates
- Height: 1.77 m (5 ft 9 1/2 in)
- Position: Right-back

Team information
- Current team: Emirates
- Number: 30

Youth career
- Emirates

Senior career*
Years	Team	Apps	(Gls)
2014–2022	Emirates	85	(1)
2022–2025	Dibba		
2025–	Emirates		
- * Club domestic league appearances and goals

Abdullah Mohammed (Arabic:عبد الله محمد; born 22 September 1992) is an Emirati footballer. He currently plays as a right back for Emirates.
