= 2008 AFC U-19 Championship squads =

For the start of the tournament each team were allowed 23 players within their squad. Players birthdays should be correct as of October 31, 2008 which was the start of the tournament.

== Group A ==
=== Japan ===
Head coach: (Japan) Tatsuya Makiuchi

No.	Pos.	Player	Date of birth (age)	Caps	Goals	Club
1	GK	Shuichi Gonda	3 March 1989 (aged 19)			(Japan Football Association) FC Tokyo
2	DF	Shoma Kamata	15 June 1990 (aged 18)			(Japan Football Association) Shonan Bellmare
4	DF	Takashi Kanai	5 February 1989 (aged 19)			(Japan Football Association) Yokohama F. Marinos
5	DF	Taisuke Muramatsu	16 December 1990 (aged 17)			(Japan Football Association) Honda FC
6	MF	Takuya Aoki	16 September 1989 (aged 19)			(Japan Football Association) Omiya Ardija
7	MF	Shinji Kagawa	17 March 1989 (aged 19)			(Japan Football Association) Cerezo Osaka
8	MF	Kota Mizunuma	22 February 1990 (aged 18)			(Japan Football Association) Yokohama F. Marinos
11	FW	Keisuke Endo	20 March 1989 (aged 19)			(Japan Football Association) Mito Hollyhock
12	MF	Kohei Shimoda	8 April 1989 (aged 19)			(Japan Football Association) FC Tokyo
13	MF	Tomotaka Okamoto	29 June 1989 (aged 19)			(Japan Football Association) Sanfrecce Hiroshima
14	MF	Kosuke Yamamoto	29 October 1989 (aged 19)			(Japan Football Association) Jubilo Iwata
15	MF	Yoichiro Kakitani	3 January 1990 (aged 18)			(Japan Football Association) Cerezo Osaka
16	DF	Jun Sonoda	23 January 1989 (aged 19)			(Japan Football Association) Kawasaki Frontale
17	MF	Hiroki Miyazawa	28 June 1989 (aged 19)			(Japan Football Association) Consadole Sapporo
18	MF	Jun Suzuki	22 April 1989 (aged 19)			(Japan Football Association) Avispa Fukuoka
20	MF	Hiroki Kawano	30 March 1989 (aged 19)			(Japan Football Association) Tokyo Verdy
21	GK	Takuya Matsumoto	6 February 1989 (aged 19)			(Japan Football Association) Juntendo University
23	MF	Koki Otani	8 April 1989 (aged 19)			(Japan Football Association) Urawa Reds
25	FW	Kensuke Nagai	5 March 1989 (aged 19)			(Japan Football Association) Fukuoka University
29	MF	Fumiya Kogure	28 June 1989 (aged 19)			(Japan Football Association) Albirex Niigata
36	DF	Kazunari Ohno	4 August 1989 (aged 19)			(Japan Football Association) Albirex Niigata
40	MF	Genki Haraguchi	9 May 1991 (aged 17)			(Japan Football Association) Urawa Reds
50	MF	Yuki Yoshida	3 May 1989 (aged 19)			(Japan Football Association) Kawasaki Frontale

=== Saudi Arabia ===
Head coach: (Brazil) Nelson

No.	Pos.	Player	Date of birth (age)	Caps	Goals	Club
1	GK	Abdullah Al-Sudairy	2 February 1992 (aged 16)			(Saudi Arabian Football Federation) Al-Hilal
3	DF	Abdullah Al-Dawsari	23 June 1990 (aged 18)			(Saudi Arabian Football Federation) Al-Hilal
4	MF	Waleed Bakshween	12 November 1989 (aged 18)			(Saudi Arabian Football Federation) Al-Ahli
5	DF	Hadi Yahya	3 April 1990 (aged 18)			(Saudi Arabian Football Federation) Al-Shabab
6	MF	Mohammed Al-Qarni	24 November 1989 (aged 18)			(Saudi Arabian Football Federation) Al-Hilal
8	MF	Yahya Al-Shehri	26 June 1990 (aged 18)			(Saudi Arabian Football Federation) Al-Ettifaq
9	FW	Omar Al-Khodhari	26 August 1990 (aged 18)			(Saudi Arabian Football Federation) Al-Ittihad
10	MF	Nawaf Al Abed	26 January 1990 (aged 18)			(Saudi Arabian Football Federation) Al-Hilal
11	FW	Saud Hamood	17 August 1989 (aged 19)			(Saudi Arabian Football Federation) Al-Riyadh
12	MF	Ahmed Al-Zaaq	28 April 1989 (aged 19)			(Saudi Arabian Football Federation) Al-Raed
13	DF	Basem Al-Montashari	18 September 1990 (aged 18)			(Saudi Arabian Football Federation) Al-Ittihad
14	DF	Yousef Khamees	1 April 1990 (aged 18)			(Saudi Arabian Football Federation) Al-Nassr
15	MF	Mohammed Al-Safri	25 June 1990 (aged 18)			(Saudi Arabian Football Federation) Al-Ahli
17	MF	Salman Al-Faraj	1 August 1989 (aged 19)			(Saudi Arabian Football Federation) Al-Hilal
18	DF	Redwan Al-Mousa	13 September 1990 (aged 18)			(Saudi Arabian Football Federation) Al-Hilal
19	DF	Moussa Ayyash				(Saudi Arabian Football Federation) Damac
20	DF	Sultan Al-Bishi	28 January 1990 (aged 18)			(Saudi Arabian Football Federation) Al-Hilal
21	GK	Basem Atallah	11 July 1989 (aged 19)			(Saudi Arabian Football Federation) Al-Tai
22	GK	Hussain Shae'an	23 May 1989 (aged 19)			(Saudi Arabian Football Federation) Al-Shabab
23	MF	Abdulmohsen Assiri	11 June 1990 (aged 18)			(Saudi Arabian Football Federation) Al-Nassr
24	MF	Abdulrahim Jaizawi	31 August 1989 (aged 19)			(Saudi Arabian Football Federation) Al-Ahli
28	MF	Mohammed Abousaban	20 January 1990 (aged 18)			(Saudi Arabian Football Federation) Al-Ittihad
29	DF	Waleed Al-Mutairi	10 March 1989 (aged 19)			(Saudi Arabian Football Federation) Al-Taawoun

=== Yemen ===
Head coach: Abdullah Mohammed Fodel

No.	Pos.	Player	Date of birth (age)	Caps	Goals	Club
30	GK	Mohammed Al-Wesabi	1 January 1989 (aged 19)			(Yemen Football Association)
1	GK	Ali Abdulrazzaq Al-Ansi	1 January 1989 (aged 19)			(Yemen Football Association)
18	GK	Abdullah Mohammed Al-Shaibani	1 January 1989 (aged 19)			(Yemen Football Association)
4	DF	Basem Saeed Ali Aqel	1 January 1989 (aged 19)			(Yemen Football Association)
14	DF	Faisal Fahd Mohammed	1 January 1989 (aged 19)			(Yemen Football Association)
21	DF	Hamad Ahmed Al-Zubairi	1 January 1989 (aged 19)			(Yemen Football Association)
25	DF	Hadi Yaslam Saeed	1 January 1989 (aged 19)			(Yemen Football Association)
2	DF	Ammar Abdullah	1 January 1989 (aged 19)			(Yemen Football Association)
3	DF	Mohammed Fouad	1 January 1989 (aged 19)			(Yemen Football Association)
6	DF	Alaa Saif Mohammed Ali	1 January 1989 (aged 19)			(Yemen Football Association)
16	DF	Wael Abdullah Al-Mesri	1 January 1989 (aged 19)			(Yemen Football Association)
23	DF	Akram Salem Hussein Omar	1 January 1989 (aged 19)			(Yemen Football Association)
26	DF	Alaa Ahmed Saeed Blaidi	1 January 1989 (aged 19)			(Yemen Football Association)
5	MF	Hussein Al-Ghazi	1 January 1989 (aged 19)			(Yemen Football Association) Al-Saqr
8	MF	Maged Yahya Ali Aqel	1 January 1989 (aged 19)			(Yemen Football Association)
11	MF	Najib Ahmed Al-Haddad	1 January 1989 (aged 19)			(Yemen Football Association)
15	MF	Rian Mohammed Ali Haikal	1 January 1989 (aged 19)			(Yemen Football Association)
9	FW	Mouath Ali Al-Ameri	1 January 1989 (aged 19)			(Yemen Football Association)
17	FW	Ammar Mohammed Al-Blay	1 January 1989 (aged 19)			(Yemen Football Association)
7	FW	Mohammed Al-Khadher	1 January 1989 (aged 19)			(Yemen Football Association)
19	FW	Zaid Ahmed Hasan Salah	1 January 1989 (aged 19)			(Yemen Football Association)

== Group B ==
=== South Korea ===
Head coach: (South Korea) Cho Dong-Hyun

No.	Pos.	Player	Date of birth (age)	Caps	Goals	Club
1	GK	Lee Beom-Young	2 April 1989 (aged 19)			(Korea Football Association) Busan IPark
2	DF	Jung Joon-Yeon	30 April 1989 (aged 19)			(Korea Football Association) Chunnam Dragons
3	DF	Yun Suk-Young	13 February 1990 (aged 18)			(Korea Football Association) Chunnam Dragons
4	DF	Oh Jae-Suk	4 January 1990 (aged 18)			(Korea Football Association) Kyunghee University
5	DF	Kim Young-Gwon	27 February 1990 (aged 18)			(Korea Football Association) Jeonju University
6	MF	Moon Ki-Han	17 March 1989 (aged 19)			(Korea Football Association) FC Seoul
7	MF	Koo Ja-Cheol	27 February 1989 (aged 19)			(Korea Football Association) Jeju United
10	FW	Cho Young-Cheol	31 May 1989 (aged 19)			(Japan Football Association) Yokohama FC
11	MF	Seo Jung-Jin	26 September 1989 (aged 19)			(Korea Football Association) Jeonbuk Hyundai Motors
12	GK	Kim Da-Sol	4 January 1989 (aged 19)			(Korea Football Association) Yonsei University
13	MF	Oh Bong-Jin	30 June 1989 (aged 19)			(Korea Football Association) Jeju United
14	MF	Lee Chang-Ho	5 April 1989 (aged 19)			(Korea Football Association) Soongsil University
15	MF	Seo Yong-Duk	10 September 1989 (aged 19)			(Korea Football Association) Yonsei University
16	FW	Choi Jung-Han	3 June 1989 (aged 19)			(Korea Football Association) Yonsei University
17	MF	Yoo Ji-No	6 November 1989 (aged 18)			(Korea Football Association) Chunnam Dragons
18	FW	Kim Dong-Sub	29 March 1989 (aged 19)			(Japan Football Association) Shimizu S-Pulse
19	DF	Yang Joon-A	13 June 1989 (aged 19)			(Korea Football Association) Korea University
20	DF	Hong Jeong-Ho	12 August 1989 (aged 19)			(Korea Football Association) Chosun University
21	GK	Kim Seung-Gyu	30 September 1990 (aged 18)			(Korea Football Association) Ulsan Hyundai
23	MF	Kim Bo-Kyung	6 October 1989 (aged 19)			(Korea Football Association) Hongik University
24	MF	Park Jong-Woo	10 March 1989 (aged 19)			(Korea Football Association) Yonsei University
27	DF	Kim Jae-Min	8 March 1989 (aged 19)			(Korea Football Association) Soongsil University
28	FW	Han Jae-Man	20 March 1989 (aged 19)			(Korea Football Association) Dongguk University

=== Iraq ===
Head coach: Hakim Shaker

No.	Pos.	Player	Date of birth (age)	Club
1	GK	Mohannad Qasim	1 July 1990 (aged 18)	(Iraq Football Association) Baghdad
2	DF	Waleed Bahar	27 April 1991 (aged 17)	(Iraq Football Association) Al-Naft
3	DF	Mohammed Hussein Jassim		(Iraq Football Association) Maysan FC
4	DF	Faris Hassan Neamah		(Iraq Football Association) Al-Sinaa
5	MF	Nadeem Karim	1 January 1989 (aged 19)	(Iraq Football Association) Al-Naft
6	DF	Mohammed Abdul-Zahra	1 January 1989 (aged 19)	(Iraq Football Association) Al-Naft
7	MF	Salar Abdul-Jabbar		(Iraq Football Association) Al-Zawraa
8	MF	Jaber Shakir		(Iraq Football Association) Al-Kahraba
9	MF	Qays Tareq Ali		(Iraq Football Association) Al-Shorta
10	MF	Mohammed Faisal Mutashar		(Iraq Football Association)
11	MF	Nabeel Sabah	1 July 1990 (aged 18)	(Iraq Football Association) Al-Kahraba
12	MF	Ali Sabah Abas		(Iraq Football Association)
13	MF	Salam Mohsin Sadeq		(Iraq Football Association)
14	MF	Hussein Jawad Kadhim		(Iraq Football Association) Al-Shatra
15	DF	Hussein Ali Waheed		(Iraq Football Association) Al-Quwa Al-Jawiya
16	FW	Akram Hashim		(Iraq Football Association)
20	FW	Ayood Ayad Mohammed		(Iraq Football Association) Peris FC
23	GK	Ali Mutashar	7 May 1989 (aged 19)	(Iraq Football Association) Al-Naft
24	MF	Wissam Sajjad		(Iraq Football Association) Karbala FC
25	FW	Hussein Kareem	3 June 1990 (aged 18)	(Iraq Football Association)
27	DF	Saif Jabbar		(Iraq Football Association) Al-Jaish
29	FW	Ali Oudah		(Iraq Football Association) Al-Jaish
40	GK	Salih Qaed Sadeer		(Iraq Football Association) Najaf

== Group C ==
=== China PR ===
Head coach: Liu Chunming

No.	Pos.	Player	Date of birth (age)	Caps	Goals	Club
1	GK	Wu Yan	7 January 1989 (aged 19)			(Chinese Football Association) Wuhan Optics Valley
4	DF	Liu Yi	26 August 1988 (aged 20)			(Chinese Football Association) Tianjin Teda F.C.
5	DF	Yu Yang	6 August 1989 (aged 19)			(Chinese Football Association) Beijing Guoan
6	MF	Hui Jiakang	19 January 1989 (aged 19)			(Chinese Football Association) Shenzhen Shangqingyin
8	MF	Cao Yunding	22 November 1989 (aged 18)			(Chinese Football Association) Shanghai East Asia
11	FW	Zhang Yuan	8 December 1989 (aged 18)			(Chinese Football Association) Chengdu Blades
12	FW	Zhang Chengdong	9 February 1989 (aged 19)			(Chinese Football Association) Liaoning FC
13	DF	Zheng Zheng	11 July 1989 (aged 19)			(Chinese Football Association) Shandong Luneng
14	MF	Piao Cheng	21 August 1989 (aged 19)			(Chinese Football Association) Yanbian FC
15	MF	Zhang Linpeng	9 May 1989 (aged 19)			(Chinese Football Association) Shanghai East Asia
16	MF	Liu Xiaodong	14 January 1989 (aged 19)			(Chinese Football Association) Changchun Yatai
17	FW	Tan Yang	9 January 1989 (aged 19)			(Chinese Football Association) Zhejiang Greentown
18	MF	Jiang Xiaoyu	11 June 1989 (aged 19)			(Chinese Football Association) Chengdu Blades
19	DF	Wu Xi	19 February 1989 (aged 19)			(Chinese Football Association) Hebei Tiangong
20	DF	Qiu Tianyi	31 January 1989 (aged 19)			(Chinese Football Association) Harbin Yiteng F.C.
21	FW	Zhang Jian	28 February 1989 (aged 19)			(Chinese Football Association) Chongqing Lifan
22	GK	Hou Sen	30 June 1989 (aged 19)			(Chinese Football Association) Beijing Guoan
23	DF	Li Haozhen	3 January 1989 (aged 19)			(Chinese Football Association) Shaanxi Chanba
25	GK	Liu Dianzuo	26 June 1990 (aged 18)			(Chinese Football Association) Harbin Yiteng F.C.
27	MF	Wang Liang	23 July 1989 (aged 19)			(Chinese Football Association) Dalian Shide Siwu FC
21	FW	Zhou Liao	14 January 1989 (aged 19)			(Chinese Football Association) Wuhan Optics Valley
33	MF	Li Zhichao	18 February 1989 (aged 19)			(Chinese Football Association) Dalian Shide Siwu FC
34	MF	Wang Yunlong	22 February 1990 (aged 18)			(Chinese Football Association) Shanghai East Asia

=== North Korea ===
No.	Pos.	Player	Date of birth (age)	Caps	Goals	Club
1	GK	O Mun-Song	14 December 1990 (aged 17)			(DPR Korea Football Association) Sobaeksu
2	DF	Sim Hyon-Jin	1 January 1991 (aged 17)			(DPR Korea Football Association) Sobaeksu
3	DF	Ri Hyong-Mu	4 November 1991 (aged 16)			(DPR Korea Football Association) Sobaeksu
4	DF	Han Kyong-Gwang	16 February 1990 (aged 18)			(DPR Korea Football Association) Sobaeksu
5	DF	Kang Chol-Ryong I	20 June 1990 (aged 18)			(DPR Korea Football Association) Sobaeksu
6	DF	Kang Chol-Ryong II	1 July 1990 (aged 18)			(DPR Korea Football Association) Pyongyang
7	MF	Myong Cha-Hyon	20 March 1990 (aged 18)			(DPR Korea Football Association) Sobaeksu
8	MF	Pak Yu-Il	5 January 1990 (aged 18)			(DPR Korea Football Association) Sobaeksu
9	FW	An Il-Bom	2 December 1990 (aged 17)			(DPR Korea Football Association) Sobaeksu
10	MF	Ri Sang-Chol	26 December 1990 (aged 17)			(DPR Korea Football Association) Amrokgang
11	MF	Pak Hyong-Jin	6 July 1990 (aged 18)			(DPR Korea Football Association) Sobaeksu
12	MF	Ri Kum-Song				(DPR Korea Football Association)
13	MF	O Jin-Hyok	28 February 1990 (aged 18)			(DPR Korea Football Association) Rimyongsu
14	FW	Rim Chol-Min	24 November 1990 (aged 17)			(DPR Korea Football Association) Sobaeksu
15	MF	Hong Kum-Song	3 June 1990 (aged 18)			(DPR Korea Football Association)
16	FW	Pak Kwang-Ryong	21 September 1992 (aged 16)			(DPR Korea Football Association) Kigwancha
17	MF	Han Jin-Il				(DPR Korea Football Association)
18	FW	Nam Thak-Ho				(DPR Korea Football Association)
19	MF	Jo Jong-Chol				(DPR Korea Football Association)
20	GK	Ri Kang	20 April 1988 (aged 20)			(DPR Korea Football Association)
21	FW	Jong Il-Ju	27 January 1990 (aged 18)			(DPR Korea Football Association) Sobaeksu
22	GK	Kim Yong Gil				(DPR Korea Football Association)

=== Lebanon ===
Head coach: (Lebanon) Samir Saad

No.	Pos.	Player	Date of birth (age)	Club
1	GK	Mohamad Dakramanji	27 October 1989 (aged 19)	(Lebanese Football Association) Ahed
3	DF	Niazy Shheme	13 March 1990 (aged 18)	(Lebanese Football Association) Safa
4	MF	Simon Assaf		
5	DF	Omar Ouaida	29 March 1989 (aged 19)	(Lebanese Football Association) Safa
6	MF	Mohamad Alame		
7	FW	Hussein Awada	22 March 1990 (aged 18)	(Lebanese Football Association) Mabarra
8	DF	Abdallah Taleb	20 March 1989 (aged 19)	(Lebanese Football Association) Mabarra
9	MF	Mohamad Jaafar	16 April 1991 (aged 17)	(Lebanese Football Association) Nejmeh
10	FW	Ali Bazzi (Captain)	1 April 1989 (aged 19)	(Lebanese Football Association) Sagesse
11	MF	Kassem Leila	20 January 1990 (aged 18)	(Lebanese Football Association) Ansar
12	FW	Ali Farran	15 January 1989 (aged 19)	(Lebanese Football Association) Ansar
14	MF	Ahmad Zreik	27 October 1990 (aged 18)	(Lebanese Football Association) Ahed
15	FW	Kassem Mannaa	13 April 1991 (aged 17)	(Lebanese Football Association) Ansar
16	DF	Nour Mansour	22 October 1989 (aged 19)	(Lebanese Football Association) Safa
17	MF	Hassan Alaouieh		(Lebanese Football Association) Nejmeh
18	MF	Rabih Ataya	16 July 1989 (aged 19)	(Lebanese Football Association) Ansar
20	FW	Mohamad Haidar	8 November 1989 (aged 18)	(Lebanese Football Association) Tadamon Sour
21	GK	Nazih Assaad	20 January 1990 (aged 18)	(Lebanese Football Association) Nejmeh
22	GK	Mohamad Hijazi	11 October 1989 (aged 19)	(Lebanese Football Association) Tadamon Sour
26	MF	Alaa Termoss	4 March 1990 (aged 18)	(Lebanese Football Association) Ansar
28	FW	Mustapha Chahine	8 October 1989 (aged 19)	(Lebanese Football Association) Nejmeh
29	MF	Amin Fadel	25 February 1991 (aged 17)	(German Football Association) Fortuna Düsseldorf
30	MF	Milan Ismail Fadel		

== Group D ==
=== Australia ===
No.	Pos.	Player	Date of birth (age)	Caps	Club
2	DF	Sebastian Ryall	18 July 1989 (aged 19)		(Australia) Melbourne Victory
3	MF	Ben Kantarovski	10 January 1992 (aged 16)		(Australia) Newcastle Jets
4	DF	Luke DeVere	5 November 1989 (aged 18)		(Australia) Queensland Roar
5	DF	Nikolas Tsattalios	1 March 1990 (aged 18)		(Australia) Sydney FC
6	MF	Mitch Nichols	1 May 1989 (aged 19)		(Australia) Queensland Roar
7	FW	Tahj Minniecon	13 February 1989 (aged 19)		(Australia) Queensland Roar
8	MF	James Holland	15 May 1989 (aged 19)		(Australia) Newcastle Jets
9	FW	Milos Lujic	15 February 1990 (aged 18)		(Australia) Melbourne Victory
11	MF	Tommy Oar	10 December 1991 (aged 16)		(Australia) Queensland Roar
12	FW	Jason Naidovski	19 July 1989 (aged 19)		(Australia) Newcastle Jets
14	MF	Oliver Bozanic	8 January 1989 (aged 19)		(England) Reading
15	DF	Matthew Jurman	8 December 1989 (aged 18)		(Australia) Sydney FC
16	DF	Peter Cvetanovski	23 July 1989 (aged 19)		(Germany) Borussia Mönchengladbach
18	GK	Andrew Redmayne	13 January 1989 (aged 19)		(Australia) Central Coast Mariners
19	MF	Sam Munro	23 November 1990 (aged 17)		(Australia) Sydney FC
20	FW	Marko Ješić	7 August 1989 (aged 19)		(Australia) Newcastle Jets
23	MF	Isaka Cernak	9 April 1989 (aged 19)		(Australia) Queensland Roar
24	MF	James Brown	19 February 1990 (aged 18)		(Australia) Australian Institute of Sport
28	DF	Daniel Mullen	26 October 1989 (aged 19)		(Australia) Adelaide United
34	DF	Ryan McGowan	15 August 1989 (aged 19)		(Scotland) Heart of Midlothian
36	FW	Nathan Elasi	18 November 1989 (aged 18)		(Australia) Melbourne Victory
41	GK	Michael McEntegart	17 January 1990 (aged 18)		(England) Everton
42	GK	Danny Ireland	30 September 1990 (aged 18)		(England) Coventry City

=== Uzbekistan ===
No.	Pos.	Player	Date of birth (age)	Caps	Goals	Club
1	GK	Doniyor Usmanov	23 June 1989 (aged 19)			(Uzbekistan Football Association) FK Neftchi Farg'ona
16	GK	Mukhiddin Khudoyorov	22 November 1989 (aged 18)			(Uzbekistan Football Association) FC Bunyodkor
2	DF	Sherzod Azamov	14 January 1990 (aged 18)			(Uzbekistan Football Association) Nasaf
3	FW	Ivan Nagaev	17 February 1989 (aged 19)			(Uzbekistan Football Association) Nasaf
4	DF	Kamoliddin Tadjibaev	1 April 1989 (aged 19)			(Uzbekistan Football Association) FC Bunyodkor
8	MF	Sunnatulla Mamadaliyev	20 December 1990 (aged 17)			(Uzbekistan Football Association) Nasaf
14	DF	Dilyorbek Irmatov	20 February 1989 (aged 19)			(Uzbekistan Football Association) FK Neftchi Farg'ona
5	MF	Zohir Pirimov	6 March 1990 (aged 18)			(Uzbekistan Football Association) Olmaliq FK
18	MF	Jasur Hasanov	24 July 1989 (aged 19)			(Uzbekistan Football Association) FK Buxoro
6	FW	Kenja Turaev	1 March 1989 (aged 19)			(Uzbekistan Football Association) Nasaf Qarshi
7	MF	Fozil Musaev	2 January 1989 (aged 19)			(Uzbekistan Football Association) Mash'al Mubarek
10	DF	Islom Tukhtakhodjaev	30 October 1989 (aged 19)			(Uzbekistan Football Association) FK Neftchi Farg'ona
12	DF	Zohid Raupov	7 June 1989 (aged 19)			(Uzbekistan Football Association) Olmaliq FK
17	MF	Oybek Kilichev	17 January 1989 (aged 19)			(Uzbekistan Football Association) FC Pakhtakor
9	DF	Murod Khalmukhammedov	23 December 1990 (aged 17)			(Uzbekistan Football Association) FC Pakhtakor
13	DF	Gulom Urunov	7 June 1989 (aged 19)			(Uzbekistan Football Association) FC Pakhtakor
15	MF	Sherzod Karimov	26 January 1989 (aged 19)			(Uzbekistan Football Association) FC Pakhtakor
11	FW	Sanat Shikhov	28 December 1989 (aged 18)			(Uzbekistan Football Association) FC Pakhtakor

=== Thailand ===
No.	Pos.	Player	Date of birth (age)	Caps	Goals	Club
1	GK	Kawin Thamsatchanan	26 January 1990 (aged 18)			(Football Association of Thailand) Muangthong United
2	DF	Yordrak Namuangrak	19 September 1989 (aged 19)			(Football Association of Thailand) Sriracha
4	DF	Nawapol Tantraseni	9 March 1989 (aged 19)			(Football Association of Thailand) Muangthong United
5	DF	Komkrit Camsokchuerk	20 April 1989 (aged 19)			(Football Association of Thailand) Bangkok University
7	DF	Chalermsuk Kaewsuktae	9 May 1989 (aged 19)			(Football Association of Thailand) Nakhon Pathom
8	DF	Jattupol Sitthilor	5 March 1990 (aged 18)			(Football Association of Thailand) Khonkaen
9	MF	Supaphorn Prompinit	3 March 1989 (aged 19)			(Football Association of Thailand) Sriracha
10	MF	Kroekrit Thaweekarn	19 November 1990 (aged 17)			(Football Association of Thailand) Sriracha
12	FW	Kraikitti In-utane	1 March 1989 (aged 19)			(Football Association of Thailand) Tobacco Monopoly
13	MF	Attapong Nooprom	13 February 1990 (aged 18)			(Football Association of Thailand) Sriracha
14	MF	Niranrit Jarernsuk	9 June 1989 (aged 19)			(Football Association of Thailand) Coke Bangpra
15	DF	Seeket Madputeh	9 March 1989 (aged 19)			(Football Association of Thailand) Coke Bangpra
16	DF	Sujarit Jantakul	4 March 1989 (aged 19)			(Football Association of Thailand) Sriracha
18	GK	Samuel Cunningham	18 January 1989 (aged 19)			(Football Association of Thailand) Raj Pracha
19	MF	Wattanasap Jarernsri	1 January 1989 (aged 19)			(Football Association of Thailand) Chula-Sinthana
20	MF	Anusorn Srichaluang	8 October 1989 (aged 19)			(Football Association of Thailand) Bangkok Bank
21	DF	Theerathon Bunmathan	6 February 1990 (aged 18)			(Football Association of Thailand) Raj Pracha
23	FW	Charin Boodhad	24 January 1989 (aged 19)			(Football Association of Thailand) Khonkaen
24	MF	Rachanon Srinork	24 June 1989 (aged 19)			(Football Association of Thailand) Osotspa
25	DF	Wasan Pramkum	1 March 1990 (aged 18)			(Football Association of Thailand) Coke Bangpra
27	DF	Tanasak Srisai	25 September 1989 (aged 19)			(Football Association of Thailand) Prachinburi
29	FW	Ekkachai Rittipan	23 May 1990 (aged 18)			(Football Association of Thailand) Sriracha
33	GK	Todsaporn Sri-reung	18 March 1990 (aged 18)			(Football Association of Thailand) Samut Songkhram

=== Jordan ===
Head coach: (Jordan) Ahmed Abdel-Qader

No.	Pos.	Player	Date of birth (age)	Caps	Club
1	GK	Feras Saleh			(Jordan) Al-Wahdat SC
2	DF	Tareq Khattab			(Jordan) Al-Wahdat SC
3	DF	Oday Zahran			(Jordan) Shabab Al-Ordon
4	MF	Khalil Bani Attiah			(Jordan) Al-Faisaly
5	DF	Zaid Jaber			(Jordan) Shabab Al-Ordon
6	DF	Ibrahim Al-Zawahreh			(Jordan) Al-Faisaly
7	MF	Yusuf Al-Thudan			(Jordan) Al-Arabi (Irbid)
8	FW	Lo'ay Adous			(Jordan) Al-Baqa'a SC
9	MF	Yousef Al-Naber			(Jordan) Shabab Al-Ordon
10	FW	Amer Abu Hwaiti			(Jordan) Al-Wahdat SC
11	MF	Anas Al-Jbarat			(Jordan) Shabab Al-Ordon
12	GK	Mustafa Abu Musameh			(Jordan) Al-Arabi (Irbid)
14	FW	Yusuf Al-Rawashdeh			(Jordan) Al-Arabi (Irbid)
15	FW	Saleh Al-Jawhari			(Jordan) Al-Jazeera
16	MF	Omar Jarwan			
17	MF	Ahmed Shaalan			(Jordan) Al-Wahdat SC
18	DF	Yasser Al-Rawashdeh			(Jordan) Al-Arabi (Irbid)
19	DF	Ahmed Habboul			
21	DF	Mohammad Fatma			
22	GK	Adel Yaseen			
22	GK	Maali Al-Hattab			
23	MF	Saeed Murjan			(Jordan) Al-Arabi (Irbid)
24	MF	Tariq Nader			
	MF	Ahmed Samir			(Jordan) Al-Jazeera
	FW	Mohammad Omar Shishani			(Jordan) Al-Ahli
	MF	Ahmed Elias			(Jordan) Al-Wahdat SC
	GK	Abdullah Al-Zubi			(Jordan) Al-Ramtha SC
	GK	Salah Massad			(Jordan) Al-Yarmouk FC
	DF	Karim Obeidat			(Jordan) Kufrsoum SC
	DF	Amjad Al-Fadel			(Jordan) Al-Ramtha SC
	MF	Hamza Ibrahim			
	DF	Mahmoud Al-Amoush			
	DF	Ghassan Ayyeh			
	MF	Hamza Ibrahim			
