= Football at the 2010 Asian Games – Men's team squads =

Below are the squads for the men's football tournament at the 2010 Asian Games, played in Guangzhou, China.

== Group A ==
=== China ===
Coach: Sun Wei

No.	Pos.	Player	Date of birth (age)	Club
1	GK	Wang Dalei	10 January 1989 (aged 21)	(Chinese Football Association) Shanghai Shenhua
2	DF	Ren Hang	23 February 1989 (aged 21)	(Chinese Football Association) Changsha Ginde
3	DF	Yang Boyu	24 June 1989 (aged 21)	(Chinese Football Association) Dalian Shide
4	DF	Zheng Zheng	11 July 1989 (aged 21)	(Chinese Football Association) Shandong Luneng Taishan
5	DF	Li Jianbin	19 April 1989 (aged 21)	(Chinese Football Association) Chengdu Blades
6	MF	Lü Peng	28 October 1989 (aged 21)	(Chinese Football Association) Dalian Shide
7	MF	Song Boxuan	16 September 1989 (aged 21)	(Chinese Football Association) Shanghai Shenhua
8	MF	Wu Xi	19 February 1989 (aged 21)	(Chinese Football Association) Shanghai Shenhua
9	DF	Li Kai	25 July 1989 (aged 21)	(Chinese Football Association) Shaanxi Chanba
10	MF	Piao Cheng	21 August 1989 (aged 21)	(Chinese Football Association) Yanbian
11	FW	Wang Xuanhong	24 July 1989 (aged 21)	(Chinese Football Association) Dalian Shide
12	GK	Zhang Shichang	7 October 1989 (aged 21)	(Chinese Football Association) Henan Construction
13	DF	Zhang Linpeng	9 May 1989 (aged 21)	(Chinese Football Association) Shanghai East Asia
14	MF	Wang Yunlong	22 February 1990 (aged 20)	(Chinese Football Association) Shanghai East Asia
15	DF	Zhang Yuan	8 December 1989 (aged 20)	(Chinese Football Association) Chengdu Blades
16	MF	Mirahmetjan Muzepper	14 January 1991 (aged 19)	(Chinese Football Association) Henan Construction
17	FW	Zhao Honglüe	4 December 1989 (aged 20)	(Chinese Football Association) Dalian Shide
18	DF	Zhang Jian	28 February 1989 (aged 21)	(Chinese Football Association) Guangdong Sunray Cave
19	FW	Lü Wenjun	11 March 1989 (aged 21)	(Chinese Football Association) Shanghai East Asia
20	DF	Zhou Yun	31 December 1990 (aged 19)	(Chinese Football Association) Jiangsu Sainty

=== Japan ===
Coach: Takashi Sekizuka

No.	Pos.	Player	Date of birth (age)	Club
1	GK	Takuya Masuda	29 June 1989 (aged 21)	(Japan Football Association) Ryutsu Keizai University
2	DF	Yuki Saneto	19 January 1989 (aged 21)	(Japan Football Association) Kochi University
3	DF	Jun Sonoda	23 January 1989 (aged 21)	(Japan Football Association) Kawasaki Frontale
4	DF	Takefumi Toma	21 March 1989 (aged 21)	(Japan Football Association) Kashima Antlers
5	DF	Yusuke Higa	15 May 1989 (aged 21)	(Japan Football Association) Ryutsu Keizai University
6	DF	Shoma Kamata	15 June 1989 (aged 21)	(Japan Football Association) JEF United Chiba
7	MF	Ryohei Yamazaki	14 March 1989 (aged 21)	(Japan Football Association) Júbilo Iwata
8	MF	Kazuya Yamamura	2 December 1989 (aged 20)	(Japan Football Association) Ryutsu Keizai University
9	MF	Masato Kurogi	24 October 1989 (aged 21)	(Japan Football Association) Cerezo Osaka
10	MF	Kota Mizunuma	22 February 1990 (aged 20)	(Japan Football Association) Tochigi
11	FW	Kensuke Nagai	5 March 1989 (aged 21)	(Japan Football Association) Vissel Kobe
12	DF	Shunya Suganuma	17 May 1990 (aged 20)	(Japan Football Association) Gamba Osaka
13	DF	Daisuke Suzuki	29 January 1990 (aged 20)	(Japan Football Association) Albirex Niigata
14	MF	Shohei Otsuka	11 April 1990 (aged 20)	(Japan Football Association) Gamba Osaka
15	MF	Keigo Higashi	20 July 1990 (aged 20)	(Japan Football Association) Oita Trinita
16	MF	Hotaru Yamaguchi	6 October 1990 (aged 20)	(Japan Football Association) Cerezo Osaka
17	MF	Kyohei Noborizato	13 November 1990 (aged 19)	(Japan Football Association) Kawasaki Frontale
18	GK	Shunsuke Ando	10 August 1990 (aged 20)	(Japan Football Association) Kawasaki Frontale
19	FW	Masato Kudo	6 May 1990 (aged 20)	(Japan Football Association) Kashiwa Reysol
20	FW	Takamitsu Tomiyama	26 December 1990 (aged 19)	(Japan Football Association) Waseda University

=== Kyrgyzstan ===
Coach: Murat Jumakeyev

No.	Pos.	Player	Date of birth (age)	Club
1	GK	Pavel Matyash	11 July 1987 (aged 23)	(Kyrgyz Football Union) Dordoi-Dynamo Naryn
2	MF	Aziz Sydykov	23 June 1992 (aged 18)	(Kyrgyz Football Union) Alga Bishkek
3	DF	Rustam Zakirov	19 December 1989 (aged 20)	(Kyrgyz Football Union) Abdish-Ata Kant
4	DF	Azamat Baimatov	3 December 1989 (aged 20)	(Kyrgyz Football Union) Dordoi-Dynamo Naryn
5	DF	Kursanbek Sheratov	1 October 1989 (aged 21)	(Kyrgyz Football Union) Abdish-Ata Kant
6	DF	Artur Muladjanov	5 July 1989 (aged 21)	(Kyrgyz Football Union) Alga Bishkek
7	MF	Sergey Kaleutin	20 June 1986 (aged 24)	(Kyrgyz Football Union) Abdish-Ata Kant
8	DF	Davron Askarov	6 January 1988 (aged 22)	(Kyrgyz Football Union) Dordoi-Dynamo Naryn
9	DF	Vladimir Kasyan	5 March 1988 (aged 22)	(Kyrgyz Football Union) Abdish-Ata Kant
10	FW	Mirlan Murzaev	29 March 1990 (aged 20)	(Kyrgyz Football Union) Dordoi-Dynamo Naryn
11	MF	Aibek Bokoyev	4 January 1982 (aged 28)	(Kyrgyz Football Union) Abdish-Ata Kant
12	DF	Roman Ablakimov	28 August 1987 (aged 23)	(Kyrgyz Football Union) Abdish-Ata Kant
15	MF	Artem Muladjanov	4 February 1988 (aged 22)	(Kyrgyz Football Union) Dordoi-Dynamo Naryn
16	GK	Maksim Agapov	20 March 1988 (aged 22)	(Kyrgyz Football Union) Abdish-Ata Kant
17	FW	Ildar Amirov	9 October 1987 (aged 23)	(Kyrgyz Football Union) Dordoi-Dynamo Naryn
18	MF	Pavel Sidorenko	26 March 1987 (aged 23)	(Kyrgyz Football Union) Abdish-Ata Kant
19	MF	Tursunali Rustamov	31 January 1990 (aged 20)	(Kyrgyz Football Union) Sher Bishkek
20	FW	Vladimir Khoroshunov	3 September 1984 (aged 26)	(Kyrgyz Football Union) Sher Bishkek

=== Malaysia ===
Coach: K. Rajagopal

No.	Pos.	Player	Date of birth (age)	Club
1	GK	Zamir Selamat	9 June 1989 (aged 21)	(Football Association of Malaysia) Harimau Muda A
4	DF	Asraruddin Putra Omar	26 August 1988 (aged 22)	(Football Association of Malaysia) Selangor
5	DF	Norhafiz Zamani	15 July 1981 (aged 29)	(Football Association of Malaysia) PLUS
6	DF	Faizal Muhamad	3 March 1989 (aged 21)	(Football Association of Malaysia) Harimau Muda A
8	MF	Safiq Rahim	5 July 1987 (aged 23)	(Football Association of Malaysia) Selangor
9	FW	Norshahrul Idlan	8 June 1986 (aged 24)	(Football Association of Malaysia) Kelantan
11	MF	Gary Steven Robbat	3 September 1992 (aged 18)	(Football Association of Malaysia) Harimau Muda A
12	MF	Amar Rohidan	23 April 1987 (aged 23)	(Football Association of Malaysia) Perlis
13	FW	Ahmad Fakri Saarani	8 July 1989 (aged 21)	(Football Association of Malaysia) Perlis
14	FW	Khyril Muhymeen	9 May 1987 (aged 23)	(Football Association of Malaysia) Kedah
15	MF	K. Gurusamy	11 January 1989 (aged 21)	(Football Association of Malaysia) Harimau Muda A
16	DF	S. Kunanlan	15 September 1986 (aged 24)	(Football Association of Malaysia) Negeri Sembilan
18	FW	Mahali Jasuli	2 April 1989 (aged 21)	(Football Association of Malaysia) Harimau Muda A
19	MF	Faizal Abu Bakar	20 September 1990 (aged 20)	(Football Association of Malaysia) Kedah
20	FW	Izzaq Faris Ramlan	18 April 1990 (aged 20)	(Football Association of Malaysia) Harimau Muda A
22	GK	Khairul Fahmi Che Mat	7 January 1989 (aged 21)	(Football Association of Malaysia) Kelantan
23	DF	S. Chanthuru	14 December 1987 (aged 22)	(Football Association of Malaysia) Kelantan
24	DF	Muslim Ahmad	25 April 1989 (aged 21)	(Football Association of Malaysia) Harimau Muda A
25	DF	Fandi Othman	25 April 1992 (aged 18)	(Football Association of Malaysia) Harimau Muda A
27	DF	Fadhli Shas	21 January 1991 (aged 19)	(Football Association of Malaysia) Harimau Muda A

== Group B ==
=== Bahrain ===
Coach: Mohamed Al-Shamlan

No.	Pos.	Player	Date of birth (age)	Club
1	GK	Mahmood Abdulghani Al-Ajimi	31 October 1990 (aged 20)	(Bahrain Football Association) Al-Shabab
6	MF	Sayed Dhiya Saeed	17 July 1992 (aged 18)	(Bahrain Football Association) Al-Muharraq
7	DF	Fahad Showaiter	9 October 1990 (aged 20)	(Bahrain Football Association) Al-Muharraq
8	MF	Hisham Mansoor	24 June 1990 (aged 20)	(Bahrain Football Association) Al-Busaiteen
9	DF	Mohamed Ajaj	1 January 1990 (aged 20)	(Bahrain Football Association) Al-Busaiteen
10	MF	Abdulwahab Al-Safi	4 June 1984 (aged 26)	(Bahrain Football Association) Al-Ahli
11	DF	Mohamed Al-Banna	29 September 1990 (aged 20)	(Bahrain Football Association) Al-Hala
13	DF	Abdulla Al-Haza'a	19 July 1990 (aged 20)	(Bahrain Football Association) East Riffa
16	GK	Ebrahim Lutfalla	24 September 1992 (aged 18)	(Bahrain Football Association) Al-Shabab
17	MF	Mohamed Al-Harban	27 June 1990 (aged 20)	(Bahrain Football Association) Al-Najma
18	DF	Mohamed Jaafar Sahwan	24 June 1989 (aged 21)	(Bahrain Football Association) Al-Shabab
19	MF	Abdulwahab Al-Malood	7 June 1990 (aged 20)	(Bahrain Football Association) Al-Hidd
20	DF	Rashed Al-Hooti	24 December 1989 (aged 20)	(Bahrain Football Association) East Riffa
21	GK	Ahmed Mushaima	13 December 1982 (aged 27)	(Bahrain Football Association) Al-Ahli
22	DF	Mohamed Duaij Mahorfi	9 May 1989 (aged 21)	(Bahrain Football Association) Al-Riffa
23	MF	Mohamed Al-Romaihi	9 September 1990 (aged 20)	(Bahrain Football Association) Al-Bahrain
26	DF	Ebrahim Shawqi	12 June 1990 (aged 20)	(Bahrain Football Association) Al-Manama
27	FW	Sayed Ali Isa	10 September 1987 (aged 23)	(Bahrain Football Association) Al-Malkiya
29	DF	Ismaeel Mohamed Bakhit	17 August 1989 (aged 21)	(Bahrain Football Association) Al-Hidd
30	MF	Mahmood Abbas Ayyad	12 June 1985 (aged 25)	(Bahrain Football Association) Al-Ahli

=== Iran ===
Coach: Gholam Hossein Peyrovani

No.	Pos.	Player	Date of birth (age)	Club
1	GK	Mehdi Rahmati	2 February 1983 (aged 27)	(Football Federation Islamic Republic of Iran) Sepahan Isfahan
3	DF	Amir Sharafi	25 June 1989 (aged 21)	(Football Federation Islamic Republic of Iran) Esteghlal Ahvaz
4	DF	Jalal Hosseini	3 February 1982 (aged 28)	(Football Federation Islamic Republic of Iran) Sepahan Isfahan
5	DF	Reza Talabeh	26 February 1989 (aged 21)	(Football Federation Islamic Republic of Iran) Foolad Natanz
6	MF	Kamal Kamyabinia	18 January 1989 (aged 21)	(Football Federation Islamic Republic of Iran) Rah Ahan Tehran
7	MF	Hamid Reza Aliasgari	25 May 1990 (aged 20)	(Football Federation Islamic Republic of Iran) Persepolis Tehran
8	DF	Ehsan Hajsafi	25 February 1990 (aged 20)	(Football Federation Islamic Republic of Iran) Sepahan Isfahan
9	FW	Gholamreza Rezaei	6 August 1984 (aged 26)	(Football Federation Islamic Republic of Iran) Persepolis Tehran
10	FW	Karim Ansarifard	3 April 1990 (aged 20)	(Football Federation Islamic Republic of Iran) Saipa Alborz
11	MF	Mohsen Mosalman	27 January 1991 (aged 19)	(Football Federation Islamic Republic of Iran) Malavan Bandar Anzali
12	GK	Saleh Khalilazad	17 April 1990 (aged 20)	(Football Federation Islamic Republic of Iran) Rah Ahan Tehran
13	DF	Ali Zeinali	11 April 1990 (aged 20)	(Football Federation Islamic Republic of Iran) Saipa Alborz
14	FW	Masoud Ebrahimzadeh	16 January 1989 (aged 21)	(Football Federation Islamic Republic of Iran) Tractorsazi Tabriz
15	DF	Ali Marzban	7 July 1990 (aged 20)	(Football Federation Islamic Republic of Iran) Foolad Natanz
16	FW	Arash Afshin	21 January 1989 (aged 21)	(Football Federation Islamic Republic of Iran) Foolad Khuzestan
17	MF	Sina Ashouri	16 September 1988 (aged 22)	(Football Federation Islamic Republic of Iran) Zob Ahan Isfahan
18	DF	Rasoul Kor	24 June 1989 (aged 21)	(Football Federation Islamic Republic of Iran) Sanat Mes Kerman
19	MF	Mehdi Daghagheleh	30 January 1990 (aged 20)	(Football Federation Islamic Republic of Iran) Malavan Bandar Anzali
20	FW	Iman Mousavi	5 February 1989 (aged 21)	(Football Federation Islamic Republic of Iran) Moghavemat Sepasi Shiraz
22	GK	Mohammad Rashid Mazaheri	18 May 1989 (aged 21)	(Football Federation Islamic Republic of Iran) Esteghlal Ahvaz

=== Turkmenistan ===
Coach: Kamil Mingazow

No.	Pos.	Player	Date of birth (age)	Club
2	DF	Hemaýat Kömekow	3 May 1991 (aged 19)	(Football Federation of Turkmenistan) HTTU Aşgabat
3	DF	Şöhrat Söýünow	8 March 1992 (aged 18)	(Football Federation of Turkmenistan) HTTU Aşgabat
4	DF	Ilýas Minhairow	15 February 1988 (aged 22)	(Football Federation of Turkmenistan) Altyn Asyr Aşgabat
5	DF	Maksim Belyh	7 August 1984 (aged 26)	(Football Federation of Turkmenistan) Balkan Balkanabat
6	MF	Döwran Seýdiýew	13 September 1988 (aged 22)	(Football Federation of Turkmenistan) Altyn Asyr Aşgabat
7	FW	Arslanmyrat Amanow	28 March 1990 (aged 20)	(Football Federation of Turkmenistan) HTTU Aşgabat
8	MF	Umidjan Astanow	11 August 1990 (aged 20)	(Football Federation of Turkmenistan) Merw Mary
9	MF	Guwanç Hangeldiýew	9 August 1987 (aged 23)	(Football Federation of Turkmenistan) Aşgabat FK
10	MF	Amir Gurbani	24 October 1987 (aged 23)	(Football Federation of Turkmenistan) Altyn Asyr Aşgabat
11	MF	Mihail Muhammedow	5 July 1987 (aged 23)	(Football Federation of Turkmenistan) HTTU Aşgabat
12	MF	Elman Tagaýew	2 June 1989 (aged 21)	(Football Federation of Turkmenistan) Aşgabat FK
13	MF	Ilýa Tamurkin	9 May 1989 (aged 21)	(Football Federation of Turkmenistan) Merw Mary
14	MF	Süleýman Orazow	2 January 1989 (aged 21)	(Football Federation of Turkmenistan) Aşgabat FK
15	DF	Nazar Çoliýew	21 July 1986 (aged 24)	(Football Federation of Turkmenistan) Aşgabat FK
17	MF	Serdar Geldiýew	1 October 1987 (aged 23)	(Football Federation of Turkmenistan) Balkan Balkanabat
18	FW	Aleksandr Boliýan	27 July 1989 (aged 21)	(Football Federation of Turkmenistan) Şagadam Türkmenbaşy
19	FW	Pirmyrat Gazakow	28 May 1988 (aged 22)	(Football Federation of Turkmenistan) HTTU Aşgabat
20	FW	Ruslan Mingazow	23 November 1991 (aged 18)	(Latvian Football Federation) Skonto Riga
36	GK	Rahmanberdi Alyhanow	9 January 1986 (aged 24)	(Football Federation of Turkmenistan) HTTU Aşgabat
40	GK	Alikper Kerimow	22 April 1988 (aged 22)	(Football Federation of Turkmenistan) Ahal FK

=== Vietnam ===
Coach: Phan Thanh Hùng

No.	Pos.	Player	Date of birth (age)	Club
1	GK	Trần Khoa Điển	25 February 1987 (aged 23)	(Vietnam Football Federation) Thành Phố Hồ Chí Minh
2	FW	Hoàng Đình Tùng	24 August 1988 (aged 22)	(Vietnam Football Federation) Lam Sơn Thanh Hóa
3	DF	Nguyễn Thành Long Giang	6 September 1988 (aged 22)	(Vietnam Football Federation) Navibank Sài Gòn
4	DF	Nguyễn Quốc Long	19 February 1988 (aged 22)	(Vietnam Football Federation) Hà Nội T&T
7	MF	Nguyễn Thái Dương	10 December 1988 (aged 21)	(Vietnam Football Federation) Hoàng Anh Gia Lai
8	FW	Lê Văn Thắng	8 February 1990 (aged 20)	(Vietnam Football Federation) Lam Sơn Thanh Hóa
9	MF	Phạm Thành Lương	10 September 1988 (aged 22)	(Vietnam Football Federation) Hà Nội ACB
13	MF	Nguyễn Ngọc Điểu	27 March 1987 (aged 23)	(Vietnam Football Federation) Khatoco Khánh Hòa
15	DF	Từ Hữu Phước	13 June 1987 (aged 23)	(Vietnam Football Federation) Khatoco Khánh Hòa
17	MF	Nguyễn Đức Thiện	9 March 1988 (aged 22)	(Vietnam Football Federation) Becamex Bình Dương
18	FW	Nguyễn Anh Đức	24 October 1985 (aged 25)	(Vietnam Football Federation) Becamex Bình Dương
20	MF	Bùi Văn Hiếu	2 October 1989 (aged 21)	(Vietnam Football Federation) Than Quảng Ninh
21	DF	Nguyễn Minh Đức	14 September 1983 (aged 27)	(Vietnam Football Federation) Xi Măng Hải Phòng
23	MF	Đinh Thanh Trung	24 January 1988 (aged 22)	(Vietnam Football Federation) Hòa Phát Hà Nội
25	GK	Bùi Tấn Trường	19 February 1986 (aged 24)	(Vietnam Football Federation) TĐCS Đồng Tháp
27	DF	Chu Ngọc Anh	9 January 1989 (aged 21)	(Vietnam Football Federation) Megastar Nam Định
30	DF	Trần Đình Đồng	20 May 1987 (aged 23)	(Vietnam Football Federation) Sông Lam Nghệ An
31	MF	Phan Thanh Hưng	14 January 1987 (aged 23)	(Vietnam Football Federation) SHB Đà Nẵng
34	DF	Võ Hoàng Quảng	22 May 1987 (aged 23)	(Vietnam Football Federation) SHB Đà Nẵng
35	MF	Nguyễn Trọng Hoàng	14 April 1989 (aged 21)	(Vietnam Football Federation) Sông Lam Nghệ An

== Group C ==
=== Jordan ===
Coach: (Egypt) Alaa Nabil

No.	Pos.	Player	Date of birth (age)	Club
1	GK	Mohammad Abu-Khousa	3 December 1987 (aged 22)	(Jordan Football Association) Al-Baqa'a
3	DF	Mohammed Samer Fatma	12 January 1990 (aged 20)	(Jordan Football Association) Al-Yarmouk
4	DF	Zaid Jaber	6 January 1991 (aged 19)	(Jordan Football Association) Shabab Al-Ordon
5	DF	Mohammad Mustafa	29 October 1989 (aged 21)	(Jordan Football Association) Al-Jazeera
6	DF	Ibrahim Al-Zawahreh	17 January 1989 (aged 21)	(Jordan Football Association) Al-Faisaly
7	FW	Yousef Al-Rawashdeh	14 March 1990 (aged 20)	(Jordan Football Association) Al-Arabi
8	MF	Yousef Al-Naber	8 August 1989 (aged 21)	(Jordan Football Association) Shabab Al-Ordon
9	FW	Mohammad Omar Shishani	24 April 1989 (aged 21)	(Jordan Football Association) Al-Ahli
10	FW	Mahmoud Za'tara	8 January 1991 (aged 19)	(Jordan Football Association) Al-Faisaly
11	MF	Anas Al-Jbarat	24 February 1989 (aged 21)	(Jordan Football Association) Shabab Al-Ordon
13	DF	Ahmad Shaalan	22 February 1990 (aged 20)	(Jordan Football Association) Al-Wehdat
14	MF	Yousef Al-Thodan	9 February 1989 (aged 21)	(Jordan Football Association) Al-Arabi
15	DF	Oday Zahran	29 January 1991 (aged 19)	(Jordan Football Association) Shabab Al-Ordon
16	MF	Khalil Bani Attiah	8 June 1991 (aged 19)	(Jordan Football Association) Al-Faisaly
17	DF	Yasser Al-Rawashdeh	21 April 1990 (aged 20)	(Jordan Football Association) Al-Arabi
19	FW	Khaldoun Al-Khuzami	29 April 1990 (aged 20)	(Jordan Football Association) Al-Arabi
20	MF	Saleh Al-Jawhari	5 March 1989 (aged 21)	(Jordan Football Association) Al-Jazeera
21	MF	Ahmad Elias	9 November 1990 (aged 20)	(Jordan Football Association) Al-Wehdat
22	GK	Feras Saleh	25 December 1989 (aged 20)	(Jordan Football Association) Al-Wehdat
33	GK	Ahmad Abu-Samrah	26 February 1989 (aged 21)	(Jordan Football Association) Al-Faisaly

=== North Korea ===
Coach: Jo Dong-soeb

No.	Pos.	Player	Date of birth (age)	Club
2	DF	Yun Yong-il	31 July 1988 (aged 22)	(DPR Korea Football Association) Wolmido
3	DF	Ri Jun-il	24 August 1987 (aged 23)	(DPR Korea Football Association) Sobaeksu
4	DF	Pak Yong-jin	29 January 1989 (aged 21)	(DPR Korea Football Association) Rimyongsu
5	DF	Ri Kwang-chon	4 September 1985 (aged 25)	(DPR Korea Football Association) April 25
6	MF	Ri Chol-myong	18 February 1988 (aged 22)	(DPR Korea Football Association) Pyongyang
7	FW	Kim Kum-il	10 October 1987 (aged 23)	(DPR Korea Football Association) April 25
8	MF	Choe Myong-ho	3 July 1988 (aged 22)	(DPR Korea Football Association) Pyongyang
9	MF	Pak Song-chol	24 September 1987 (aged 23)	(DPR Korea Football Association) Rimyongsu
10	FW	Pak Kwang-ryong	27 September 1992 (aged 18)	(DPR Korea Football Association) Wolmido
11	MF	Kim Kuk-jin	5 January 1989 (aged 21)	(Swiss Football Association) Wil
12	DF	Jon Kwang-ik	5 April 1988 (aged 22)	(DPR Korea Football Association) Amnokgang
13	DF	Ri Kwang-hyok	17 August 1987 (aged 23)	(DPR Korea Football Association) Kyonggongopsong
14	DF	Pak Nam-chol	3 October 1988 (aged 22)	(DPR Korea Football Association) Amnokgang
15	MF	Kim Yong-jun	19 July 1983 (aged 27)	(DPR Korea Football Association) Pyongyang
16	MF	Pak Nam-chol	2 July 1985 (aged 25)	(DPR Korea Football Association) April 25
17	FW	Choe Kum-chol	9 February 1987 (aged 23)	(DPR Korea Football Association) April 25
18	GK	Ri Kwang-il	13 April 1988 (aged 22)	(DPR Korea Football Association) Sobaeksu
19	FW	An Chol-hyok	27 June 1987 (aged 23)	(DPR Korea Football Association) Rimyongsu
21	FW	Pak Chol-min	10 December 1988 (aged 21)	(DPR Korea Football Association) Rimyongsu
22	GK	Ju Kwang-min	20 May 1990 (aged 20)	(DPR Korea Football Association) Kigwancha

=== Palestine ===
Coach: (Tunisia) Mokhtar Tlili

No.	Pos.	Player	Date of birth (age)	Club
1	GK	Tawfiq Ali	8 November 1990 (aged 20)	(Palestinian Football Association) Taraji Wadi Al-Nes
3	DF	Alaaeddin Yamin	5 July 1992 (aged 18)	(Palestinian Football Association) Markaz Shabab Askar
4	FW	Rafit Eyad	5 January 1986 (aged 24)	(Palestinian Football Association) Markaz Shabab Al-Am'ari
5	MF	Hamza Wahdan	2 February 1990 (aged 20)	(Palestinian Football Association) Thaqafi Tulkarem
6	MF	Thaer Qarraeen	1 January 1989 (aged 21)	(Palestinian Football Association) Jabal Al-Mukaber
7	DF	Nadim Barghouthi	9 May 1989 (aged 21)	(Palestinian Football Association) Markaz Shabab Al-Am'ari
8	MF	Mohammed Jamal Jebreen	22 May 1982 (aged 28)	(Palestinian Football Association) Shabab Al-Bireh
9	FW	Suleiman Obeid	28 October 1981 (aged 29)	(Palestinian Football Association) Markaz Shabab Al-Am'ari
10	MF	Ali El-Khatib	18 March 1989 (aged 21)	(Palestinian Football Association) Jabal Al-Mukaber
11	MF	Wasim Eqab	17 January 1989 (aged 21)	(Palestinian Football Association) Markaz Balata
12	DF	Mahmoud Abdi	9 July 1990 (aged 20)	(Palestinian Football Association) Markaz Shabab Askar
14	FW	Jehad Saqr	23 January 1989 (aged 21)	(Palestinian Football Association) Taraji Wadi Al-Nes
15	DF	Mustafa Abu-Kweik	16 August 1989 (aged 21)	(Palestinian Football Association) Shabab Al-Bireh
16	DF	Sajed Karakra	1 June 1990 (aged 20)	(Palestinian Football Association) Shabab Al-Bireh
17	FW	Amjad Zidan	27 March 1993 (aged 17)	(Palestinian Football Association) Taraji Wadi Al-Nes
18	FW	Ahmed Shbaita	27 October 1990 (aged 20)	(Palestinian Football Association) Markaz Shabab Askar
20	MF	Ahmed Salama	7 November 1989 (aged 21)	(Palestinian Football Association) Markaz Shabab Al-Am'ari
22	GK	Jamal Saffaqa	23 January 1990 (aged 20)	(Palestinian Football Association) Thaqafi Tulkarem
30	GK	Dawood Al-Radayda	21 June 1993 (aged 17)	(Palestinian Football Association) Shabab Al-Obaidiya

=== South Korea ===
Coach: Hong Myung-bo

No.	Pos.	Player	Date of birth (age)	Club
1	GK	Kim Seung-gyu	30 September 1990 (aged 20)	(Korea Football Association) Ulsan Hyundai
2	DF	Hong Chul	17 September 1990 (aged 20)	(Korea Football Association) Seongnam Ilhwa Chunma
3	DF	Shin Kwang-hoon	18 March 1987 (aged 23)	(Korea Football Association) Pohang Steelers
4	DF	Kim Ju-young	9 July 1988 (aged 22)	(Korea Football Association) Gyeongnam
5	DF	Kim Young-gwon	27 February 1990 (aged 20)	(Japan Football Association) FC Tokyo
6	DF	Hong Jeong-ho	12 August 1989 (aged 21)	(Korea Football Association) Jeju United
7	MF	Koo Ja-cheol	27 February 1989 (aged 21)	(Korea Football Association) Jeju United
8	MF	Yoon Bit-garam	7 May 1990 (aged 20)	(Korea Football Association) Gyeongnam
9	FW	Park Hee-seong	7 April 1990 (aged 20)	(Korea Football Association) Korea University
10	FW	Park Chu-young	10 July 1985 (aged 25)	(French Football Federation) Monaco
11	MF	Cho Young-cheol	31 May 1989 (aged 21)	(Japan Football Association) Albirex Niigata
12	DF	Kim Min-woo	25 February 1990 (aged 20)	(Japan Football Association) Sagan Tosu
13	DF	Jang Suk-won	11 August 1989 (aged 21)	(Korea Football Association) Seongnam Ilhwa Chunma
14	MF	Kim Jung-woo	9 May 1982 (aged 28)	(Korea Football Association) Gwangju Sangmu
15	DF	Oh Jae-suk	4 January 1990 (aged 20)	(Korea Football Association) Suwon Samsung Bluewings
16	MF	Seo Jung-jin	6 September 1989 (aged 21)	(Korea Football Association) Jeonbuk Hyundai Motors
17	DF	Yun Suk-young	13 February 1990 (aged 20)	(Korea Football Association) Chunnam Dragons
18	FW	Ji Dong-won	28 May 1991 (aged 19)	(Korea Football Association) Chunnam Dragons
19	MF	Kim Bo-kyung	6 October 1989 (aged 21)	(Japan Football Association) Oita Trinita
20	GK	Lee Bum-young	2 April 1989 (aged 21)	(Korea Football Association) Busan IPark

== Group D ==
=== Kuwait ===
Coach: Maher Al-Shammari

No.	Pos.	Player	Date of birth (age)	Club
1	GK	Sattam Al-Hussaini	10 January 1984 (aged 26)	(Kuwait Football Association) Al-Jahra
2	DF	Abdullah Al-Taher	23 March 1990 (aged 20)	(Kuwait Football Association) Al-Yarmouk
3	DF	Nasser Al-Wuhaib	29 July 1988 (aged 22)	(Kuwait Football Association) Kazma
4	DF	Mohammad Frieh	24 November 1988 (aged 21)	(Kuwait Football Association) Al-Sahel
5	DF	Ghazi Al-Qahadi	4 May 1989 (aged 21)	(Kuwait Football Association) Al-Nasr
6	DF	Ahmad Ebrahim	2 February 1990 (aged 20)	(Kuwait Football Association) Al-Arabi
7	MF	Mashari Al-Azmi	19 November 1987 (aged 22)	(Kuwait Football Association) Al-Salmiya
8	DF	Dhari Said	2 March 1987 (aged 23)	(Kuwait Football Association) Al-Qadsia
9	FW	Abdulhadi Khamis	19 December 1990 (aged 19)	(Kuwait Football Association) Al-Kuwait
10	FW	Khalid Ajab	28 July 1986 (aged 24)	(Kuwait Football Association) Al-Kuwait
11	FW	Hussain Al-Musawi	11 July 1988 (aged 22)	(Kuwait Football Association) Al-Arabi
13	DF	Mahdi Al-Musawi	21 March 1990 (aged 20)	(Kuwait Football Association) Al-Arabi
14	FW	Abdulrahman Al-Sarbal	15 February 1987 (aged 23)	(Kuwait Football Association) Al-Jahra
15	DF	Ahmad Nasser Al-Rashidi	25 February 1990 (aged 20)	(Kuwait Football Association) Al-Nasr
16	FW	Soud Al-Mejmed	22 July 1988 (aged 22)	(Kuwait Football Association) Al-Qadsia
17	MF	Ali Ashkanani	22 March 1988 (aged 22)	(Kuwait Football Association) Al-Arabi
20	MF	Omar Bu-Hamad	2 February 1989 (aged 21)	(Kuwait Football Association) Al-Qadsia
22	GK	Abdulaziz Kameel	19 February 1991 (aged 19)	(Kuwait Football Association) Kazma
24	MF	Adel Matar	22 February 1991 (aged 19)	(Kuwait Football Association) Al-Qadsia
31	DF	Ali Maqseed	11 December 1986 (aged 23)	(Kuwait Football Association) Al-Arabi

=== India ===
Coach: Sukhwinder Singh

No.	Pos.	Player	Date of birth (age)	Club
1	GK	Gurpreet Singh Sandhu	3 February 1992 (aged 18)	(All India Football Federation) AIFF XI
2	DF	Abhishek Das	15 November 1993 (aged 16)	(All India Football Federation) AIFF XI
4	DF	Rowilson Rodrigues	26 March 1987 (aged 23)	(All India Football Federation) Churchill Brothers
7	MF	Milan Singh	15 May 1992 (aged 18)	(All India Football Federation) AIFF XI
8	MF	Manish Maithani	1 April 1989 (aged 21)	(All India Football Federation) Mohun Bagan
9	DF	Raju Gaikwad	25 September 1990 (aged 20)	(All India Football Federation) AIFF XI
10	FW	Balwant Singh	16 December 1986 (aged 23)	(All India Football Federation) JCT
11	MF	Joaquim Abranches	28 October 1985 (aged 25)	(All India Football Federation) Dempo
12	MF	Jibon Singh	6 February 1990 (aged 20)	(All India Football Federation) AIFF XI
14	DF	Dharmaraj Ravanan	29 July 1987 (aged 23)	(All India Football Federation) Churchill Brothers
15	DF	Lalrozama Fanai	30 November 1991 (aged 18)	(All India Football Federation) AIFF XI
17	DF	Robert Lalthlamuana	4 September 1988 (aged 22)	(All India Football Federation) Churchill Brothers
18	DF	Denzil Franco	30 June 1985 (aged 25)	(All India Football Federation) Churchill Brothers
19	MF	Subodh Kumar	10 June 1990 (aged 20)	(All India Football Federation) AIFF XI
20	MF	Lalrindika Ralte	7 September 1992 (aged 18)	(All India Football Federation) AIFF XI
21	GK	Laxmikant Kattimani	3 May 1989 (aged 21)	(All India Football Federation) Dempo
23	MF	Jewel Raja	18 January 1990 (aged 20)	(All India Football Federation) AIFF XI
24	FW	Jeje Lalpekhlua	7 January 1991 (aged 19)	(All India Football Federation) AIFF XI
25	FW	Malsawmfela	9 March 1993 (aged 17)	(All India Football Federation) AIFF XI
27	FW	Jagtar Singh	15 March 1990 (aged 20)	(All India Football Federation) AIFF XI

=== Qatar ===
Coach: (Netherlands) Co Adriaanse

No.	Pos.	Player	Date of birth (age)	Club
1	GK	Muhannad Naim	28 January 1993 (aged 17)	(Qatar Football Association) Al-Sadd
2	DF	Hamid Ismail	16 June 1986 (aged 24)	(Qatar Football Association) Al-Rayyan
3	DF	Marcone Amaral	5 April 1978 (aged 32)	(Qatar Football Association) Al-Gharafa
4	DF	Al-Mahdi Ali Mukhtar	2 March 1992 (aged 18)	(Qatar Football Association) Al-Sadd
6	MF	Abdulaziz Hatem	28 October 1990 (aged 20)	(Qatar Football Association) Al-Arabi
7	FW	Fahad Khalfan	23 March 1992 (aged 18)	(Qatar Football Association) Al-Rayyan
10	FW	Hassan Al-Haydos	11 December 1990 (aged 19)	(Qatar Football Association) Al-Sadd
11	MF	Daniel Goumou	4 October 1990 (aged 20)	(Qatar Football Association) Al-Rayyan
12	FW	Mohammed Salah Al-Neel	20 April 1991 (aged 19)	(Qatar Football Association) Al-Rayyan
14	FW	Jaralla Al-Marri	3 April 1988 (aged 22)	(Qatar Football Association) Al-Rayyan
15	MF	Khalid Muftah	2 July 1992 (aged 18)	(Qatar Football Association) Lekhwiya
17	DF	Nasser Nabeel	11 February 1990 (aged 20)	(Qatar Football Association) Al-Sadd
21	MF	Hamad Al-Obeidi	21 April 1991 (aged 19)	(Qatar Football Association) Al-Rayyan
22	GK	Ahmed Soufiane	9 August 1990 (aged 20)	(Qatar Football Association) Al-Wakrah
23	FW	Mohamed El-Sayed	27 January 1987 (aged 23)	(Qatar Football Association) Umm Salal
24	MF	Adel Ahmed	10 November 1990 (aged 20)	(Qatar Football Association) Al-Ahli
25	FW	Abdullah Al-Oraimi	24 September 1991 (aged 19)	(Qatar Football Association) Al-Arabi
26	MF	Ali Assadalla	19 January 1993 (aged 17)	(Qatar Football Association) Al-Sadd
27	DF	Abdelkarim Hassan	28 August 1993 (aged 17)	(Qatar Football Association) Al-Sadd
28	DF	Mohammed Musa	23 March 1986 (aged 24)	(Qatar Football Association) Lekhwiya

=== Singapore ===
Coach: V. Sundramoorthy

No.	Pos.	Player	Date of birth (age)	Club
1	GK	Izwan Mahbud	14 July 1990 (aged 20)	(Football Association of Singapore) Young Lions
2	DF	Shakir Hamzah	20 October 1992 (aged 18)	(Football Association of Singapore) National Football Academy
3	FW	Khalili D'Cruz	14 August 1991 (aged 19)	(Football Association of Singapore) Young Lions
4	DF	Afiq Yunos	10 December 1990 (aged 19)	(Football Association of Singapore) Young Lions
5	DF	Eddie Affendy Chang	10 May 1990 (aged 20)	(Football Association of Singapore) Young Lions
6	DF	Faritz Abdul Hameed	16 January 1990 (aged 20)	(Football Association of Singapore) Young Lions
7	MF	Hariss Harun	19 November 1990 (aged 19)	(Football Association of Singapore) Young Lions
8	MF	Shahdan Sulaiman	9 May 1988 (aged 22)	(Football Association of Singapore) Tampines Rovers
9	FW	Rizwan Abdullah	4 August 1987 (aged 23)	(Football Association of Singapore) Woodlands Wellington
10	MF	Syafiq Zainal	19 July 1991 (aged 19)	(Football Association of Singapore) Balestier Khalsa
11	MF	Erwan Gunawan	20 March 1987 (aged 23)	(Football Association of Singapore) SAFFC
12	MF	Nazrul Nazari	11 February 1991 (aged 19)	(Football Association of Singapore) Young Lions
13	FW	Fazly Hasan	15 September 1988 (aged 22)	(Football Association of Singapore) Geylang United
14	MF	Zulfahmi Arifin	5 October 1991 (aged 19)	(Football Association of Singapore) Young Lions
15	MF	Izzdin Shafiq	14 December 1990 (aged 19)	(Football Association of Singapore) Young Lions
16	MF	Firdaus Kasman	24 January 1988 (aged 22)	(Football Association of Singapore) Home United
17	MF	Shahril Ishak	23 January 1984 (aged 26)	(Football Association of Indonesia) Persib Bandung
18	GK	Siddiq Durimi	27 May 1988 (aged 22)	(Football Association of Singapore) Geylang United
19	DF	Safuwan Baharudin	22 September 1991 (aged 19)	(Football Association of Singapore) Young Lions
20	FW	Eugene Luo	20 January 1991 (aged 19)	(Football Association of Singapore) Young Lions

== Group E ==
=== Bangladesh ===
Coach: (Croatia) Robert Rubčić

No.	Pos.	Player	Date of birth (age)	Club
1	GK	Aminul Hoque	5 October 1980 (aged 30)	(Bangladesh Football Federation) Muktijoddha Sangsad
2	DF	Nasirul Islam Nasir	5 October 1988 (aged 22)	(Bangladesh Football Federation) Mohammedan Dhaka
3	DF	Wali Faisal	1 March 1985 (aged 25)	(Bangladesh Football Federation) Mohammedan Dhaka
4	DF	Mohammed Ariful Islam	20 December 1987 (aged 22)	(Bangladesh Football Federation) Mohammedan Dhaka
5	DF	Rezaul Karim	1 July 1987 (aged 23)	(Bangladesh Football Federation) Farashganj
6	MF	Atiqur Rahman Meshu	26 August 1988 (aged 22)	(Bangladesh Football Federation) Abahani Limited Dhaka
7	MF	Mohamed Zahid Hossain	15 June 1988 (aged 22)	(Bangladesh Football Federation) Mohammedan Dhaka
8	MF	Mamunul Islam	12 December 1988 (aged 21)	(Bangladesh Football Federation) Mohammedan Dhaka
9	FW	Enamul Haque	1 November 1985 (aged 25)	(Bangladesh Football Federation) Abahani Limited Dhaka
10	FW	Zahid Hasan Ameli	25 December 1987 (aged 22)	(Bangladesh Football Federation) Mohammedan Dhaka
11	MF	Shakil Ahmed	7 January 1988 (aged 22)	(Bangladesh Football Federation) Mohammedan Dhaka
12	GK	Mazharul Islam Himel	16 September 1988 (aged 22)	(Bangladesh Football Federation) Sheikh Russel
14	DF	Mamun Miah	11 September 1987 (aged 23)	(Bangladesh Football Federation) Mohammedan Dhaka
15	DF	Mohamed Mintu Sheikh	3 December 1989 (aged 20)	(Bangladesh Football Federation) Feni
16	MF	Zahid Parvez Chowdhury	29 December 1987 (aged 22)	(Bangladesh Football Federation) Abahani Limited Dhaka
17	MF	Shahedul Alam Shahed	12 February 1991 (aged 19)	(Bangladesh Football Federation) Abahani Limited Dhaka
18	MF	Abdul Baten Mojumdar Komol	2 August 1987 (aged 23)	(Bangladesh Football Federation) Mohammedan Dhaka
19	MF	Imtiaz Sultan Jitu	10 February 1990 (aged 20)	(Bangladesh Football Federation) Farashganj
20	FW	Mithun Chowdhury	10 February 1989 (aged 21)	(Bangladesh Football Federation) Abahani Limited Chittagong
21	FW	Tawhidul Alam Sabuz	14 September 1990 (aged 20)	(Bangladesh Football Federation) Farashganj

=== Hong Kong ===
Coach: Tsang Wai Chung

No.	Pos.	Player	Date of birth (age)	Club
1	GK	Yapp Hung Fai	21 March 1990 (aged 20)	(Football Association of Hong Kong, China) South China
2	DF	Lee Chi Ho	16 November 1982 (aged 27)	(Football Association of Hong Kong, China) South China
3	DF	Pak Wing Chak	23 April 1990 (aged 20)	(Football Association of Hong Kong, China) Sun Hei
4	MF	Yuen Kin Man	19 January 1989 (aged 21)	(Football Association of Hong Kong, China) Pegasus
5	DF	Lai Man Fei	10 December 1988 (aged 21)	(Football Association of Hong Kong, China) Pegasus
8	MF	Xu Deshuai	13 July 1987 (aged 23)	(Football Association of Hong Kong, China) South China
9	FW	Chao Pengfei	11 July 1987 (aged 23)	(Football Association of Hong Kong, China) Sun Hei
10	FW	Au Yeung Yiu Chung	11 July 1989 (aged 21)	(Football Association of Hong Kong, China) South China
11	MF	Lai Yiu Cheong	25 September 1988 (aged 22)	(Football Association of Hong Kong, China) Pegasus
12	DF	Lo Kwan Yee	9 October 1984 (aged 26)	(Football Association of Hong Kong, China) Kitchee
13	FW	Chan Man Fai	19 June 1988 (aged 22)	(Football Association of Hong Kong, China) Kitchee
14	DF	Chan Siu Yuen	2 November 1987 (aged 23)	(Football Association of Hong Kong, China) Fourway Rangers
15	DF	Chan Wai Ho	24 April 1982 (aged 28)	(Football Association of Hong Kong, China) Fourway Rangers
16	DF	Chak Ting Fung	27 November 1989 (aged 20)	(Football Association of Hong Kong, China) Fourway Rangers
18	MF	Kwok Kin Pong	30 March 1987 (aged 23)	(Football Association of Hong Kong, China) South China
19	GK	Leung Hing Kit	22 October 1989 (aged 21)	(Football Association of Hong Kong, China) Fourway Rangers
21	DF	Tsang Kam To	21 June 1989 (aged 21)	(Football Association of Hong Kong, China) Kitchee
23	FW	Lam Hok Hei	18 September 1991 (aged 19)	(Football Association of Hong Kong, China) Fourway Rangers
24	MF	Ju Yingzhi	24 July 1987 (aged 23)	(Football Association of Hong Kong, China) Citizen
25	DF	So Wai Chuen	26 March 1988 (aged 22)	(Football Association of Hong Kong, China) Pegasus

=== United Arab Emirates ===
Coach: Mahdi Ali

No.	Pos.	Player	Date of birth (age)	Club
1	GK	Ali Khasif	9 June 1987 (aged 23)	(United Arab Emirates Football Association) Al-Jazira
2	DF	Saad Surour	19 July 1990 (aged 20)	(United Arab Emirates Football Association) Al-Ahli
3	DF	Abdullah Mousa	23 February 1987 (aged 23)	(United Arab Emirates Football Association) Al-Jazira
5	MF	Amer Abdulrahman	3 July 1989 (aged 21)	(United Arab Emirates Football Association) Baniyas
6	DF	Ali Al-Amri	7 January 1989 (aged 21)	(United Arab Emirates Football Association) Al-Jazira
7	FW	Mohamed Al-Shehhi	28 March 1988 (aged 22)	(United Arab Emirates Football Association) Al-Wahda
8	DF	Hamdan Al-Kamali	2 May 1989 (aged 21)	(United Arab Emirates Football Association) Al-Wahda
9	FW	Ahmed Ali	28 January 1990 (aged 20)	(United Arab Emirates Football Association) Baniyas
10	MF	Theyab Awana	6 July 1990 (aged 20)	(United Arab Emirates Football Association) Baniyas
11	FW	Ahmed Khalil	8 June 1991 (aged 19)	(United Arab Emirates Football Association) Al-Ahli
14	DF	Abdelaziz Sanqour	7 May 1989 (aged 21)	(United Arab Emirates Football Association) Al-Sharjah
16	FW	Saeed Al-Kathiri	28 March 1988 (aged 22)	(United Arab Emirates Football Association) Al-Wahda
17	GK	Adel Al-Hosani	23 August 1989 (aged 21)	(United Arab Emirates Football Association) Al-Wahda
18	MF	Mohamed Fawzi	22 February 1990 (aged 20)	(United Arab Emirates Football Association) Baniyas
19	DF	Mohamed Ahmed	16 April 1989 (aged 21)	(United Arab Emirates Football Association) Al-Shabab
20	DF	Abdulaziz Haikal	10 September 1990 (aged 20)	(United Arab Emirates Football Association) Al-Shabab
22	GK	Ahmed Mahmoud	30 March 1989 (aged 21)	(United Arab Emirates Football Association) Al-Shabab
23	MF	Mohammed Jamal	22 July 1989 (aged 21)	(United Arab Emirates Football Association) Al-Wasl
25	MF	Haboush Saleh	13 July 1989 (aged 21)	(United Arab Emirates Football Association) Baniyas
27	MF	Omar Abdulrahman	20 September 1991 (aged 19)	(United Arab Emirates Football Association) Al-Ain

=== Uzbekistan ===
Coach: Akhmad Ubaydullaev

No.	Pos.	Player	Date of birth (age)	Club
1	GK	Temur Juraev	12 May 1984 (aged 26)	(Uzbekistan Football Association) Pakhtakor Tashkent
2	DF	Sherzod Azamov	14 January 1990 (aged 20)	(Uzbekistan Football Association) Mash'al Mubarek
3	DF	Abduqahhor Hojiakbarov	18 July 1989 (aged 21)	(Uzbekistan Football Association) Olmaliq
4	DF	Akmal Kholmurodov	4 January 1989 (aged 21)	(Uzbekistan Football Association) Pakhtakor Tashkent
5	DF	Dilyorbek Irmatov	30 April 1989 (aged 21)	(Uzbekistan Football Association) Neftchi Fergana
6	MF	Sunnatilla Mamadaliyev	28 August 1989 (aged 21)	(Uzbekistan Football Association) Navbahor Namangan
7	MF	Odil Ahmedov	25 November 1987 (aged 22)	(Uzbekistan Football Association) Pakhtakor Tashkent
8	MF	Sherzod Karimov	26 January 1989 (aged 21)	(Uzbekistan Football Association) Pakhtakor Tashkent
9	FW	Kenja Turaev	1 March 1989 (aged 21)	(Uzbekistan Football Association) Nasaf Qarshi
10	FW	Davron Mirzaev	8 February 1989 (aged 21)	(Russian Football Union) Khimki
11	FW	Alisher Azizov	14 February 1990 (aged 20)	(Uzbekistan Football Association) Pakhtakor Tashkent
12	GK	Sanjar Kuvvatov	8 January 1990 (aged 20)	(Uzbekistan Football Association) Mash'al Mubarek
13	DF	Ikbol Babakhanov	19 May 1989 (aged 21)	(Uzbekistan Football Association) Pakhtakor Tashkent
14	MF	Zokhir Pirimov	6 March 1990 (aged 20)	(Uzbekistan Football Association) Olmaliq
15	DF	Gulom Urunov	7 June 1989 (aged 21)	(Uzbekistan Football Association) Pakhtakor Tashkent
16	MF	Jasur Hasanov	24 July 1989 (aged 21)	(Uzbekistan Football Association) Qizilqum Zarafshon
17	FW	Ivan Nagaev	3 July 1989 (aged 21)	(Uzbekistan Football Association) Navbahor Namangan
18	MF	Fozil Musaev	2 January 1989 (aged 21)	(Uzbekistan Football Association) Mash'al Mubarek
19	MF	Sardor Mirzaev	21 March 1991 (aged 19)	(Uzbekistan Football Association) Neftchi Fergana
20	DF	Islom Tukhtakhujaev	30 October 1989 (aged 21)	(Uzbekistan Football Association) Neftchi Fergana

== Group F ==
=== Maldives ===
Coach: Mauroof Ahmed

No.	Pos.	Player	Date of birth (age)	Club
2	DF	Ahmed Abdulla	11 March 1987 (aged 23)	(Football Association of Maldives) New Radiant
4	MF	Mohamed Umair	3 July 1988 (aged 22)	(Football Association of Maldives) VB Sports
5	FW	Ibrahim Fazeel	9 October 1980 (aged 30)	(Football Association of Maldives) Victory
7	FW	Ali Ashfaq	6 September 1985 (aged 25)	(Football Association of Maldives) VB Sports
8	DF	Mohamed Thasneem	24 June 1987 (aged 23)	(Football Association of Maldives) Maziya
10	FW	Ali Nafiu	30 December 1989 (aged 20)	(Football Association of Maldives) Maziya
11	FW	Asadhulla Abdulla	19 October 1990 (aged 20)	(Football Association of Maldives) Valencia
12	MF	Ismail Easa	19 December 1989 (aged 20)	(Football Association of Maldives) Victory
13	FW	Hussain Niyaz Mohamed	19 March 1987 (aged 23)	(Football Association of Maldives) Victory
14	DF	Abdulla Ibrahim	3 September 1988 (aged 22)	(Football Association of Maldives) VB Sports
15	DF	Shafiu Ahmed	16 March 1987 (aged 23)	(Football Association of Maldives) Victory
17	FW	Mohamed Fuhaid	27 April 1988 (aged 22)	(Football Association of Maldives) Maziya
18	GK	Mohamed Faisal	4 September 1988 (aged 22)	(Football Association of Maldives) Victory
19	MF	Akram Abdul Ghanee	19 March 1987 (aged 23)	(Football Association of Maldives) VB Sports
20	FW	Ali Fasir	4 September 1988 (aged 22)	(Football Association of Maldives) Valencia
21	MF	Rilwan Waheed	14 February 1991 (aged 19)	(Football Association of Maldives) Valencia
25	GK	Imran Mohamed	18 December 1980 (aged 29)	(Football Association of Maldives) VB Sports
26	FW	Abdulla Muaz	2 December 1990 (aged 19)	(Football Association of Maldives) Vyansa
28	DF	Samdhooh Mohamed	28 September 1991 (aged 19)	(Football Association of Maldives) All Youth Linkage
29	DF	Ahmed Farah	2 July 1988 (aged 22)	(Football Association of Maldives) Maziya

=== Oman ===
Coach: Ibrahim Sumar Al-Balushi

No.	Pos.	Player	Date of birth (age)	Club
1	GK	Bassam Al-Alawi	1 March 1989 (aged 21)	(Oman Football Association) Al-Taliya
2	DF	Nadhir Sloum Al-Maskari	9 August 1992 (aged 18)	(Oman Football Association) Al-Nahda
3	DF	Jaber Al-Owaisi	4 November 1989 (aged 21)	(Oman Football Association) Al-Seeb
5	DF	Muheeb Al-Balushi	23 January 1991 (aged 19)	(Oman Football Association) Al-Nasr
6	MF	Malik Al-Hinai	10 March 1990 (aged 20)	(Oman Football Association) Muscat
7	MF	Khalil Al-Alawi	13 May 1991 (aged 19)	(Oman Football Association) Al-Suwaiq
8	FW	Aman Younis	6 June 1989 (aged 21)	(Oman Football Association) Fanja
9	FW	Waleed Al-Saadi	18 June 1990 (aged 20)	(Oman Football Association) Al-Suwaiq
10	MF	Hussain Al-Hadhri	21 May 1990 (aged 20)	(Oman Football Association) Dhofar
11	FW	Abdullah Abdulhadi	25 April 1992 (aged 18)	(Oman Football Association) Al-Orouba
12	DF	Al-Moatasim Al-Mukhaini	25 December 1989 (aged 20)	(Oman Football Association) Sur
15	MF	Mohammed Al-Musalami	8 December 1989 (aged 20)	(Oman Football Association) Saham
16	DF	Mohammed Al-Gheilani	18 June 1989 (aged 21)	(Oman Football Association) Sur
19	MF	Basim Al-Rajaibi	13 April 1992 (aged 18)	(Oman Football Association) Dhofar
20	MF	Badar Nasib Bamasila	25 January 1992 (aged 18)	(Oman Football Association) Dhofar
21	MF	Amer Said Al-Shatri	5 April 1990 (aged 20)	(Oman Football Association) Al-Nasr
22	GK	Bassam Al-Battashi	23 March 1990 (aged 20)	(Oman Football Association) Muscat
23	MF	Nayef Khamis	30 September 1989 (aged 21)	(Oman Football Association) Dhofar
24	GK	Sabeit Jumaa Al-Alawi	4 December 1990 (aged 19)	(Oman Football Association) Sur
88	GK	Mohannad Al-Zaabi	25 October 1992 (aged 18)	(Oman Football Association) Al-Khabourah

=== Pakistan ===
Coach: Akhtar Mohiuddin

No.	Pos.	Player	Date of birth (age)	Club
1	GK	Jaffar Khan	20 March 1981 (aged 29)	(Pakistan Football Federation) Army
2	DF	Aurangzeb Baloch	23 February 1991 (aged 19)	(Pakistan Football Federation) HBL
3	DF	Muhammad Ahmed	3 January 1988 (aged 22)	(Pakistan Football Federation) WAPDA
4	DF	Samar Ishaq	1 January 1986 (aged 24)	(Pakistan Football Federation) KRL
5	DF	Atif Bashir	3 April 1985 (aged 25)	(Football Association of Wales) Barry Town United
6	MF	Mehmood Khan	10 June 1991 (aged 19)	(Pakistan Football Federation) KRL
7	MF	Yasir Afridi	27 July 1988 (aged 22)	(Pakistan Football Federation) KRL
8	MF	Abbas Ali	3 September 1990 (aged 20)	(Pakistan Football Federation) NBP
9	FW	Rizwan Asif	8 January 1990 (aged 20)	(Pakistan Football Federation) KRL
10	FW	Kaleemullah Khan	20 September 1992 (aged 18)	(Pakistan Football Federation) KRL
11	MF	Muhammad Tauseef Ahmed	2 April 1992 (aged 18)	(Pakistan Football Federation) WAPDA
12	MF	Muhammad Adil	7 September 1992 (aged 18)	(Pakistan Football Federation) KRL
13	MF	Zain Ullah	25 November 1991 (aged 18)	(Pakistan Football Federation) WAPDA
14	DF	Haider Ali	10 October 1992 (aged 18)	(Pakistan Football Federation) WAPDA
15	DF	Ahsan Ullah	13 December 1992 (aged 17)	(Pakistan Football Federation) PEL
16	DF	Umer Farooq	18 October 1989 (aged 21)	(Pakistan Football Federation) KESC
17	FW	Saddam Hussain	10 April 1993 (aged 17)	(Pakistan Football Federation) NBP
18	GK	Amir Gul Chhutto	7 April 1990 (aged 20)	(Pakistan Football Federation) NBP
19	FW	Faraz Ahmed	29 September 1987 (aged 23)	(The Football Association) Ali Islam
20	FW	Shani Qayum	30 November 1993 (aged 16)	(The Football Association) Ossett Town

=== Thailand ===
Coach: (England) Bryan Robson

No.	Pos.	Player	Date of birth (age)	Club
1	GK	Kawin Thamsatchanan	26 January 1990 (aged 20)	(Football Association of Thailand) Muangthong United
2	DF	Polawat Wangkahart	27 July 1987 (aged 23)	(Football Association of Thailand) TOT-CAT
3	DF	Theerathon Bunmathan	6 February 1990 (aged 20)	(Football Association of Thailand) Buriram PEA
4	DF	Sujarit Jantakul	4 March 1989 (aged 21)	(Football Association of Thailand) Sriracha
5	DF	Suttinan Phuk-hom	29 November 1987 (aged 22)	(Football Association of Thailand) Chonburi
6	DF	Nattaporn Phanrit	11 January 1982 (aged 28)	(Football Association of Thailand) Muangthong United
7	MF	Datsakorn Thonglao	30 December 1983 (aged 26)	(Football Association of Thailand) Muangthong United
8	MF	Anawin Jujeen	13 March 1987 (aged 23)	(Football Association of Thailand) Bangkok Glass
9	FW	Ronnachai Rangsiyo	1 August 1988 (aged 22)	(Football Association of Thailand) Muangthong United
10	FW	Teerasil Dangda	6 June 1988 (aged 22)	(Football Association of Thailand) Muangthong United
11	MF	Phuritad Jarikanon	1 August 1989 (aged 21)	(Football Association of Thailand) Chonburi
12	MF	Surachet Ngamtip	1 February 1991 (aged 19)	(Football Association of Thailand) Bangkok Glass
13	MF	Ekkachai Sumrei	28 November 1988 (aged 21)	(Football Association of Thailand) Thai Port
14	FW	Kirati Keawsombat	12 January 1987 (aged 23)	(Football Association of Thailand) Buriram PEA
15	MF	Kabfah Boonmatoon	12 March 1987 (aged 23)	(Football Association of Thailand) Osotspa Saraburi
16	MF	Jakkapan Pornsai	28 March 1987 (aged 23)	(Football Association of Thailand) Insee Police United
17	MF	Wichaya Dechmitr	3 August 1989 (aged 21)	(Football Association of Thailand) Bangkok Glass
18	GK	Samuel Cunningham	18 January 1989 (aged 21)	(Football Association of Thailand) TOT-CAT
19	MF	Naruphol Ar-romsawa	16 September 1988 (aged 22)	(Football Association of Thailand) Muangthong United
20	DF	Panupong Wongsa	23 November 1983 (aged 26)	(Football Association of Thailand) Muangthong United
