= 2017 Suphanburi F.C. season =

Suphanburi
2017 season
- Chairman: Varawut Silpa-archa
- Manager: Adebayo Gbadebo
- Stadium: Suphanburi Provincial Stadium, Mueang Suphanburi, Suphanburi, Thailand
- Thai League T1: 11th
- Thai FA Cup: Quarter-finals
- Thai League Cup: Round of 32
- Top goalscorer: League: Guilherme Dellatorre (14); All: Nicolás Vélez (16)
Home colours	Away colours	Third colours

The 2017 season is Suphanburi's 7th season in the Thai League T1 by 2006–2007 and since 2013.

== Thai League ==
Date	Opponents	H / A	Result F–A	Scorers	League position
11 February 2017	Thai Honda Ladkrabang	H	2–1	Chananan 27', Dellatorre 37'	5th
19 February 2017	Port	A	2–3	Dellatorre (2) 29', 39'	8th
26 February 2017	Ubon UMT United	H	1–2	Dellatorre 83'	11th
5 March 2017	Chiangrai United	A	0–2		13th
8 March 2017	Bangkok Glass	H	1–1	Vélez 53'	14th
12 March 2017	Sukhothai	A	3–2	Dellatorre 34', Marcelo (2) 58', 88'	11th
3 April 2017	BEC Tero Sasana	A	2–2	Vélez 6', Anawin 65'	12th
8 April 2017	Chonburi	H	0–1		14th
18 April 2017	Pattaya United	A	3–1	Madrigal 79', Dellatorre 84', Chananan 90'	11th
23 April 2017	Nakhon Ratchasima Mazda	H	4–0	Chananan 5', Dellatorre 17', Madrigal 21', Vélez 44'	10th
30 April 2017	SCG Muangthong United	A	0–3		11th
3 May 2017	Super Power Samut Prakan	H	3–1	Prasit 6', Dellatorre 73' (pen.), Sirimongkhon 90+3'	11th
7 May 2017	Sisaket	A	2–2	Vélez (2) 44', 85'	11th
13 May 2017	Ratchaburi Mitr Phol	H	1–1	Marcelo 37'	11th
17 May 2017	Buriram United	A	0–3		12th
21 May 2017	Bangkok United	A	0–4		12th
28 May 2017	Navy	H	2–0	Madrigal 30', Vélez 45' (pen.)	11th
17 June 2017	Port	H	2–0	Dellatorre 78', Vélez 84'	11th
24 June 2017	Ubon UMT United	A	2–2	Chananan 53', Dellatorre 62' (pen.)	11th
28 June 2017	Chiangrai United	H	1–2	Dellatorre 74' (pen.)	11th
1 July 2017	Bangkok Glass	A	1–2	Chananan 90+2'	11th
5 July 2017	Sukhothai	H	1–1	Chananan 87'	11th
8 July 2017	BEC Tero Sasana	H	3–2	Dellatorre 29', Anawin 44', Prasit 51'	11th
29 July 2017	Chonburi	A	1–1	Dellatorre 49'	11th
5 August 2017	Pattaya United	H	0–3		12th
10 September 2017	Nakhon Ratchasima Mazda	A	2–2	Vélez (2) 37', 82'	11th
17 September 2017	SCG Muangthong United	H	1–4	Vélez 12' (pen.)	13th
20 September 2017	Super Power Samut Prakan	A	3–1	Vélez (2) 21', 39', Marcelo 43'	11th
23 September 2017	Sisaket	H	4–1	Sittisak 5' (o.g.), Elizeu 76', Napat 90+1', Vélez 90+4'	10th
14 October 2017	Ratchaburi Mitr Phol	A	1–4	Pongsakon 2'	11th
22 October 2017	Buriram United	H	0–1		11th
8 November 2017	Bangkok United	H	1–1	Napat 82'	11th
11 November 2017	Navy	A	1–0	Dellatorre 73'	11th
18 November 2017	Thai Honda Ladkrabang	A	2–2	Elizeu 17' (pen.), Thanasit 45+2'	11th

Pos	Team	Pld	W	D	L	GF	GA	GD	Pts
9	Port	34	14	8	12	60	63	−3	50
10	Ubon UMT United	34	12	11	11	55	54	+1	47
11	Suphanburi	34	11	10	13	52	58	−6	43
12	Nakhon Ratchasima Mazda	34	10	11	13	42	48	−6	41
13	Navy	34	10	10	14	42	50	−8	40

Updated to match(es) played on 18 November 2017. Source: Thai League
Rules for classification: 1) Points; 2) Head-to-head points; 3) Head-to-head goals difference; 4) Head-to-head goals scored; 5) Overall goals difference; 6) Overall goals scored; 7) Fair play points; 8) Play-off without extra time;).

== Thai FA Cup ==
Date	Opponents	H / A	Result F–A	Scorers	Round
21 June 2017	Kalasin	A	1–1 (a.e.t.) (5–3p)	Vélez 72'	Round of 64
2 August 2017	Chanthaburi	A	3–0	Dellatorre 34', Vélez 45+2', Elizeu 61'	Round of 32
27 September 2017	Rayong	A	3–0	Vélez 46', Kaimbi (2) 62', 90'	Round of 16
18 October 2017	Bangkok United	H	0–1 (a.e.t.)		Quarter-finals

== Thai League Cup ==
Date	Opponents	H / A	Result F–A	Scorers	Round
26 July 2017	Prachuap	A	1–2 (a.e.t.)	Rangsan 120+1'	Round of 32

== Reserve team in Thai League 4 ==
Suphanburi send the reserve team to compete in T4 Western Region as Suphanburi B.

Date	Opponents	H / A	Result F–A	Scorers	League position
12 February 2017	Huahin City	H	2–1	Apisit(2) 45', 45+2'	2nd
19 February 2017	Pathum Thani United	A	3–0	Wasapon 41', Janepob 90+1', Chitchanok 90+2'	2nd
27 February 2017	Ratchaburi Mitr Phol B	A	3–3	Janepob 49', Chakrit (2) 82', 84'	2nd
5 March 2017	Nonthaburi	H	5–0	Janepob 9', Apisit 31', Chakrit 45+1', Teerawut 71', Paitoon 79'	1st
12 March 2017	IPE Samut Sakhon United	H	1–1	Nirut 68'	1st
19 March 2017	BTU United	A	3–2	Panasan 12', Teerawut 50', Nirut 90+4'	1st
25 March 2017	Assumption United	A	0–1		2nd
1 April 2017	Muangkan United	H	1–0	Komkrit 20'	1st
9 April 2017	Look E-San	H	2–0	Wasapon 35', Bunlue 70'	1st
30 April 2017	Huahin City	A	1–0	Janepob 40'	1st
7 May 2017	Pathum Thani United	H	3–0	Teerawut 10', Bunlue 23', Panasan 66' (pen.)	1st
14 May 2017	Ratchaburi Mitr Phol B	H	5–2	Chitchanok 2', Chakrit 4', Kanarin 45' (o.g.), Janepob 54', Apisit 90+3' (pen.)	1st
21 May 2017	Nonthaburi	A	3–1	Janepob 13', Panasan 43', Tawon 90'	1st
28 May 2017	IPE Samut Sakhon United	A	1–0	Tawon 78'	1st
18 June 2017	BTU United	H	1–0	Teerawut 72'	1st
25 June 2017	Assumption United	H	2–1	Bunlue 7', Sirimongkhon 44'	1st
2 July 2017	Muangkan United	A	1–2	Bunlue 36'	1st
9 July 2017	Look E-San	A	4–0	Teerawut 12', Janepob (2) 36', 49', Tawon 90+3'	1st
15 July 2017	Huahin City	H	3–2	Apisit 23' (pen.), Chitchanok 37', Janepob 39'	1st
22 July 2017	Pathum Thani United	H	3–0	Napat 16', Chitchanok (2) 64', 79'	1st
30 July 2017	Ratchaburi Mitr Phol B	H	1–0	Panasan 87' (pen.)	1st
6 August 2017	Nonthaburi	H	1–0	Sirimongkhon 47'	1st
12 August 2017	IPE Samut Sakhon United	H	2–2	Nirut 55', Ekkalarp 81'	1st
19 August 2017	BTU United	H	2–2	Nirut 3', Janepob 26'	1st
26 August 2017	Assumption United	A	2–1	Sirimongkhon 38', Janepob 80'	1st
3 September 2017	Muangkan United	H	0–1		1st
9 September 2017	Look E-San	H	3–0	Kittiphan 13', Chitchanok 74', Nirut 84'	1st

Pos	Team	Pld	W	D	L	GF	GA	GD	Pts	Qualification or relegation
1	Suphanburi B (Note: Suphanburi B was a reserved team of Suphanburi in T1. So, they could not qualified to champions league round by the rules of FA Thailand.) (C)	27	20	4	3	58	22	+36	64	
2	Muangkan United (Q, P)	27	17	5	5	40	21	+19	56	Qualification to the Thai League 4 Champions League
3	BTU United (Q, P)	27	15	6	6	48	28	+20	51	Qualification to the Thai League 4 Champions League
4	Assumption United	27	14	6	7	46	24	+22	48	
5	Ratchaburi Mitr Phol B	27	11	6	10	45	42	+3	39	

Updated to match(es) played on 20 October 2017. Source: Thai League 4
Rules for classification: 1) Points; 2) Head-to-head points; 3) Head-to-head goals difference; 4) Head-to-head goals scored; 5) Overall goals difference; 6) Overall goals scored; 7) Fair play points; 8) Play-off without extra time;).
(C) Champions; (P) Promoted; (Q) Qualified for the phase indicated

== Squad goals statistics ==
No.	Pos.	Name	League	FA Cup	League Cup	Total
2	DF	(Thailand) Wasan Homsan	0	0	0	0
3	DF	(Syria) Marcelo Xavier	0	0	0	0
4	DF	(Thailand) Natthaphong Samana	0	0	0	0
5	MF	(Syria) Gilson Alves	0	0	0	0
6	DF	(Thailand) Anawin Jujeen	0	0	0	0
7	MF	(Thailand) Charyl Chappuis	0	0	0	0
8	MF	(Costa Rica) Diego Madrigal	0	0	0	0
9	FW	(Brazil) Guilherme Dellatorre	3	0	0	3
10	FW	(Thailand) Chananan Pombuppha	1	0	0	1
11	MF	(Thailand) Thanasit Siriphala	0	0	0	0
13	DF	(Thailand) Polawat Wangkahart	0	0	0	0
14	MF	(Thailand) Paitoon Nontadee	0	0	0	0
17	MF	(Thailand) Rangsan Viwatchaichok	0	0	0	0
18	GK	(Thailand) Sinthaweechai Hathairattanakool	0	0	0	0
19	MF	(Thailand) Adul Lahsoh	0	0	0	0
20	FW	(Thailand) Chitchanok Xaysensourinthone	0	0	0	0
21	DF	(Thailand) Prathan Mansiri	0	0	0	0
22	MF	(Thailand) Suban Ngernprasert	0	0	0	0
25	DF	(Thailand) Tinnakorn Asurin	0	0	0	0
26	GK	(Thailand) Paphawin Sirithongsopha	0	0	0	0
27	DF	(Thailand) Komkrit Camsokchuerk	0	0	0	0
28	FW	(Thailand) Napat Thamrongsupakorn	0	0	0	0
31	FW	(Thailand) Bunlue Thongkliang	0	0	0	0
32	DF	(Thailand) Noppol Pitafai	0	0	0	0
34	FW	(Argentina) Nicolás Vélez	0	0	0	0
35	GK	(Thailand) Adisak Bunthawi	0	0	0	0
37	MF	(Thailand) Pongsakon Seerot	0	0	0	0
38	DF	(Thailand) Apisit Kamwang	0	0	0	0
39	DF	(Thailand) Janepob Phokhi	0	0	0	0
40	MF	(Thailand) Prasit Jantum	0	0	0	0
44	GK	(Thailand) Sarut Nasri	0	0	0	0
45	MF	(Thailand) Watsapon Jueapan	0	0	0	0

== Transfers ==
First Thai footballer's market was open on 14 December 2016, to 28 January 2017.
Second Thai footballer's market is opening on 3 June 2017, to 30 June 2017.

=== In ===
Date	Pos.	Name	From
27 October 2016	MF	(Thailand) Adul Lahsoh	(Thailand) Buriram United
5 November 2016	MF	(Costa Rica) Diego Madrigal	(Costa Rica) Alajuelense
11 November 2016	FW	(Brazil) Guilherme Dellatorre	(Brazil) Atlético Paranaense
26 November 2016	FW	(Argentina) Nicolás Vélez	(India) NorthEast United
26 December 2016	DF	(Syria) Marcelo Xavier	(Brazil) Botafogo FC
26 December 2016	DF	(Thailand) Prathan Mansiri	(Thailand) Nakhon Ratchasima Mazda
26 December 2016	MF	(Thailand) Komkrit Camsokchuerk	(Thailand) Sisaket
26 December 2016	MF	(Thailand) Pongsakon Seerot	(Thailand) Bangkok United
20 January 2017	MF	(Syria) Gilson Alves	(Brazil) Cuiabá
20 January 2017	DF	(Thailand) Polawat Wangkahart	(Thailand) Nakhon Ratchasima Mazda
20 January 2017	GK	(Thailand) Paphawin Sirithongsopha	(Thailand) Chiangmai
20 January 2017	GK	(Thailand) Sarut Nasri	(Thailand) Udon Thani
20 January 2017	MF	(Thailand) Watsapon Jueapan	(Thailand) Simork
5 February 2017	DF	(Thailand) Anawin Jujeen	(Thailand) Buriram United
13 June 2016	FW	(Namibia) Lazarus Kaimbi	(Thailand) Chiangrai United
16 June 2017	DF	(Thailand) Suphan Thongsong	(Thailand) SCG Muangthong United

=== Out ===
Date	Pos.	Name	To
6 November 2016	MF	(South Korea) Jung Hoon	(South Korea) Suwon
9 November 2016	DF	(Brazil) Márcio Rosário	(Indonesia) Persela Lamongan
9 November 2016	MF	(Brazil) Luiz Otávio	(China) Zhejiang Yiteng
9 November 2016	MF	(North Macedonia) Darko Tasevski	(Thailand) Khonkaen
5 January 2017	GK	(Thailand) Boonyakait Wongsajaem	(Thailand) PTT Rayong
9 January 2017	GK	(Thailand) Pattanan Pijittham	(Thailand) Chonburi
15 January 2017	MF	(Thailand) Rattana Petch-Aporn	(Thailand) Samut Sakhon
1 February 2017	FW	(Thailand) Thossaphol Yodchan	(Thailand) Khonkaen
1 February 2017	DF	(Thailand) Supoj Wonghoi	(Thailand) Ubon UMT United
1 February 2017	FW	(Thailand) Attaphon Kannoo	(Thailand) Army United
16 June 2017	MF	(Thailand) Charyl Chappuis	(Thailand) SCG Muangthong United

=== Loan in ===
Date from	Date to	Pos.	Name	From
6 February 2017	31 December 2017	DF	(Thailand) Noppol Pitafai	(Thailand) Bangkok United
