= Chitchanok =

Chitchanok is a Thai given name. Notable people with the name include:

- Chitchanok Pulsabsakul (born 1993), Thai weightlifter
- Chitchanok Xaysensourinthone (born 1994), Thai footballer
