= Gilson Alves =

Brazilian footballer (born 1990)

Personal information
- Full name: Gilson César Santos Alves
- Date of birth: 23 January 1990 (age 36)
- Place of birth: Ribeirão Preto, Brazil
- Height: 1.84 m (6 ft 0 in)
- Position: Midfielder

Team information
- Current team: Manaus

Senior career*
Years	Team	Apps	(Gls)
2011-2014	Luverdense	72	(11)
2015	Boa	9	(1)
2015	Paysandu	9	(0)
2016	Goianiense	15	(3)
2016	Cuiabá	12	(1)
2017	Suphanburi	10	(0)
2018	Caxias	15	(0)
2018	Brasil de Pelotas	7	(0)
2019	Aimoré	3	(0)
2019	Patrocinense	8	(1)
2020-	Manaus	7	(0)
- * Club domestic league appearances and goals

Gilson César Santos Alves (born 23 January 1990) is a Brazilian footballer who plays as a midfielder for Manaus.

== Career ==
Alves started his career with Brazilian third division side Luverdense, helping them earn promotion to the Brazilian second division.

Before the 2015 season, Alves signed for Boa in the Brazilian top flight, where he made 11 appearances and scored 1 goal.

In 2015, he signed for Brazilian second division club Paysandu.

Before the 2016 season, Alves signed for Goianiense in the Brazilian fifth division.

In 2016, he signed for Brazilian third division team Cuiabá.

Before the 2017 season, he signed for Suphanburi in Thailand after registering for Syrian citizenship to qualify as an Asian player.

Before the 2018 season, Alves signed for Brazilian fourth division outfit Caxias.

In 2018, he signed for Brasil de Pelotas in the Brazilian second division.

Before the 2019 season, he signed for Brazilian fifth division side Aimoré.

In 2019, Alves signed for Patrocinense in the Brazilian fourth division.

Before the 2020 season, he signed for Brazilian third division club Manaus
