= Li Haozhen =

Chinese association football player

Personal information
- Date of birth: 3 January 1989 (age 37)
- Height: 1.91 m (6 ft 3 in)
- Position: Defender

Senior career*
Years	Team	Apps	(Gls)
2010–2013	Shanghai Shenxin	15	(0)
- * Club domestic league appearances and goals

Li Haozhen (simplified Chinese: 李昊祯; traditional Chinese: 李昊禎; pinyin: Lǐ Hàozhēn; born 3 January 1989) is a former Chinese footballer.

== Career statistics ==
=== Club ===
Club	Season	League			Cup		Other		Total	
Club	Season	Division	Apps	Goals	Apps	Goals	Apps	Goals	Apps	Goals
Shanghai Shenxin	2010	Chinese Super League	14	0	0	0	0	0	14	0
Shanghai Shenxin	2011	Chinese Super League	0	0	0	0	0	0	0	0
Shanghai Shenxin	2012	Chinese Super League	1	0	0	0	0	0	1	0
Shanghai Shenxin	2013	Chinese Super League	0	0	0	0	0	0	0	0
Career total			15	0	0	0	0	0	15	0
