= Watsapon Jueapan =

Thai footballer (born 1995)

Personal information
- Full name: Watsapon Jueapan
- Date of birth: 19 August 1995 (age 31)
- Place of birth: Thailand
- Height: 1.90 m (6 ft 3 in)
- Position: Centre-back

Senior career*
Years	Team	Apps	(Gls)
2016	Simork		
2017–2020	Suphanburi	5	(0)
2020	→ Ayutthaya United (loan)		
2022	Chanthaburi	3	(0)
- * Club domestic league appearances and goals

Watsapon Jueapan (Thai: วัศพล เจือพันธ์, born August 19, 1995) is a Thai professional footballer who plays as a centre-back.
