= Abdullah Al-Oraimi =

Omani-Qatari footballer (born 1991)

Personal information
- Full name: Abdullah Mubarak Saeed Al-Oraimi
- Date of birth: 24 September 1991 (age 35)
- Place of birth: Sur, Oman
- Height: 1.69 m (5 ft 7 in)
- Position: Midfielder

Youth career
- 2010–2011: Sur SC

Senior career*
Years	Team	Apps	(Gls)
2011–2017	Al Arabi	33	(2)
2017–2018	Qatar SC	18	(0)
2020–2021	Al-Khor	8	(0)
- * Club domestic league appearances and goals

Abdullah Al-Oraimi (Arabic:عبد الله العريمي) (born 24 September 1991) is a Qatari footballer who plays as a midfielder.
