= Jagtar Singh (footballer) =

Indian footballer (born 1980)

Personal information
- Full name: Jagtar Singh
- Date of birth: 15 March 1990 (age 36)
- Place of birth: Punjab, India
- Height: 1.78 m (5 ft 10 in)
- Position: Striker

Youth career
- 2003–2006: Mahilpur Academy
- 2006–2010: TFA

Senior career*
Years	Team	Apps	(Gls)
2010–2011	Indian Arrows	7	(1)
2011–2012	Mohun Bagan	2	(0)
2012–13	United Sikkim F.C.	0	(0)

International career
2007–2008	India U19	4	(0)
2009–2011	India U23	12	(1)
- * Club domestic league appearances and goals

Jagtar Singh (born 1990) is an Indian football player, who plays as a striker.

== Career ==
He was born in Batla, Punjab, India. He started playing for his village team, Jitosarai, as a striker. In 2003, he joined Mahilpur Academy. He stayed in the academy till 2005. Though mostly he played as a striker, sometimes he also played as a right half.

He got selected in the U-17 national school tournament. He played for 3 years in the tournament and won twice. It was during one of these years the year the tournament was held at Kashmir, they beat Manipur 2–1 in the final. Playing in the forward line, he scored the 1st goal in the final. He also was the highest scorer in that tournament.

=== TFA ===
It was because of Rakesh Masih that he joined Tata Football Academy in 2006. Masih asked him repeatedly to appear for a trial at the TFA, and eventually he got selected.

Within 1 month of his joining the TFA, he got selected to play in the Sub Junior National for Jharkhand. Carlton Chapman was the coach in the tournament which was held in Bhilai. He scored 4 goals in the tournament. In the final, they beat West Bengal 2–0, he scored one of the goals.

=== Indian Arrows ===
For the 2010-11 I-League season Jagtar Singh will play for I-League newcomers Indian Arrows. Indian Arrows is only made up of Indian Under-19 players. On 22 December 2010 Singh scored his first ever goal for Indian Arrows in there 2–1 win over Air India FC.

=== Mohun Bagan AC ===
After his one-year stint with Indian Arrows finished Singh signed for Mohun Bagan AC.

=== United Sikkim F.C ===
For the I-League 2012–13 season, he has signed for United Sikkim F.C.

== International ==
Jagtar was part of the India U-19 team that went to Germany. He also played for the U-19 team in 2008 AFC Youth Championship qualification in Iran.

He was part of the team that went to play the 2009 SAFF Championship in Bangladesh. It was an U-23 tournament and where they emerged winners.

He also played in the AFC Challenge Cup in Sri Lanka and 2010 Asian Games as part of the U-23 Indian team.

== Honours ==
India U23

- SAFF Championship: 2009
