= Rafit Eyad =

Palestinian professional football player

Rafit Eyad رأفت عياد
Personal information
- Date of birth: January 5, 1986 (age 40)
- Place of birth: Palestine
- Height: 6 ft 1 in (1.85 m)
- Position: Defender

Team information
- Current team: Jabal Al-Mukaber
- Number: 4

Senior career*
Years	Team	Apps	(Gls)
–present	Jabal Al-Mukaber		

International career^{‡}
2008–	Palestine	4	(0)
- * Club domestic league appearances and goals as of 3 March 2012 ‡ National team caps and goals as of 3 March 2012

Rafit Eyad (Arabic: رأفت عياد; born January 5, 1986, in Palestine) is a Palestinian professional football (soccer) player currently playing for Jerusalem side Jabal Al-Mukaber of the West Bank Premier League. He plays primarily as a centre back and is noted for his ability in the air and skill on the ball. Eyad received his first national team cap against Iran during the 2008 WAFF Championship. He has since gone on to represent Palestine at the 2012 AFC Challenge Cup.
