= Basem Al-Montashari =

Saudi Arabian footballer

Personal information
- Full name: Basem Mohsen Al-Montashari
- Date of birth: September 18, 1990 (age 36)
- Place of birth: Jeddah, Saudi Arabia
- Height: 1.79 m (5 ft 10 in)
- Position: Defender

Youth career
- Al-Ittihad

Senior career*
Years	Team	Apps	(Gls)
2010–2016	Al-Ittihad	32	(1)
- * Club domestic league appearances and goals

Basem Al-Montashari (Arabic: باسم المنتشري; born 18 September 1990) is a Saudi Arabian footballer who played as a defender for Al-Ittihad in the Saudi Professional League.
