= Hadi Yahya =

Saudi Arabian footballer

Personal information
- Full name: Hadi Yahya Khamaj
- Date of birth: April 3, 1990 (age 36)
- Place of birth: Saudi Arabia
- Height: 1.80 m (5 ft 11 in)
- Position: Defender

Senior career*
Years	Team	Apps	(Gls)
2009–2015	Al-Shabab	15	(0)
2014–2015	→ Al-Raed FC (loan)	8	(0)
2015–2016	Al-Faisaly	1	(0)
2016–2017	Al-Najmah		
2017–2019	Al-Kholood		
2020–2023	Wej		
2023	Qilwah		
- * Club domestic league appearances and goals

Hadi Yahya is a Saudi Arabian footballer who currently plays as a defender.
