= Rachanon Srinork =

Thai footballer

Personal information
- Full name: Rachanon Srinork
- Date of birth: 24 June 1989 (age 37)
- Place of birth: Bueng Kan, Thailand
- Height: 1.70 m (5 ft 7 in)
- Position: Striker

Team information
- Current team: Ayutthaya
- Number: 8

Senior career*
Years	Team	Apps	(Gls)
2009–2011	Osotspa	?	(?)
2012	Suphanburi	?	(?)
2012	Bangkok	?	(?)
2013–2014	Ayutthaya	?	(?)
2014	→ Chainat (loan)	4	(0)
2015	Port	6	(1)
2015	TOT	6	(0)
2016	Nakhon Pathom United		
2016	Udon Thani	8	(7)
2017	Dome		
2018–	Ayutthaya		

International career
2008–2009	Thailand U19		
- * Club domestic league appearances and goals as of 12 July 2013

Rachanon Srinork (Thai: รชานนท์ ศรีนอก, born June 24, 1989) is a Thai professional footballer.
