= Mohannad Qasim =

Iraqi footballer

Personal information
- Full name: Mohannad Qasim Kareem
- Date of birth: July 1, 1990 (age 36)
- Place of birth: Baghdad, Iraq
- Position: Goalkeeper

Team information
- Current team: Al-Najaf

Senior career*
Years	Team	Apps	(Gls)
2007–2011	Amanat Baghdad		
Jan 2012–2013	Al-Talaba SC		
2013–2014	Al-Quwa Al-Jawiya		
2014	Al-Talaba SC		
2015	Amanat Baghdad		
2016	Al-Najaf		

International career^{‡}
2013	Iraq	1	(0)
- * Club domestic league appearances and goals ‡ National team caps and goals as of 16 October 2016

Mohannad Qasim (Arabic: مهند قاسم كريم; born 1 July 1990) is an Iraqi football goalkeeper who currently plays for Al-Najaf in Iraq and the Iraq national football team.
