= Pongsakon Seerot =

Thai footballer (born 1994)

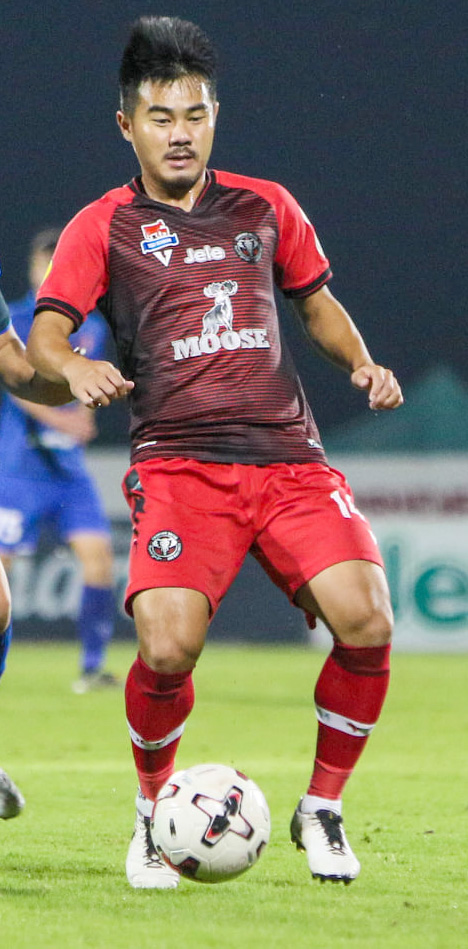
- With Chiangmai United in 2021

Personal information
- Full name: Pongsakon Seerot
- Date of birth: 4 April 1994 (age 32)
- Place of birth: Kalasin, Thailand
- Height: 1.68 m (5 ft 6 in)
- Position: Midfielder

Team information
- Current team: Trat
- Number: 19

Youth career
- 2010–2012: Chonburi

Senior career*
Years	Team	Apps	(Gls)
2013	Phan Thong	11	(0)
2013–2014	Chonburi	3	(0)
2014	→ Trat (loan)	15	(0)
2015	TOT	21	(1)
2016–	Bangkok United	0	(0)
2016	→ Sukhothai (loan)	23	(0)
2017	→ Suphanburi (loan)	13	(1)
2018	→ Trat (loan)	0	(0)
2019–2022	Chiangmai United	81	(2)
2022–	Trat	15	(0)
- * Club domestic league appearances and goals as of 30 April 2023

Pongsakon Seerot (Thai: พงศกร สีรอด), or simply known as Kai (Thai: ไก่), is a Thai professional footballer who plays as a midfielder for Thai League 2 club Trat.
