= Abdulmohsen Assiri =

Saudi football player

Personal information
- Full name: Abdulmohsen Assiri
- Date of birth: 11 June 1990 (age 36)
- Place of birth: Riyadh, Saudi Arabia
- Height: 1.75 m (5 ft 9 in)
- Position: Midfielder

Youth career
- 2005–2010: Al-Nassr

Senior career*
Years	Team	Apps	(Gls)
2010–2015	Al-Nassr	10	(0)
2014	→ Al-Raed (loan)	4	(0)
2015	→ Al-Feiha FC (loan)		
2016–2017	Damac		
- * Club domestic league appearances and goals as of 13:35, 16 June 2015 (UTC)

Abdulmohsen Assiri (Arabic: عبد المحسن عسيري; born 11 June 1990 in Riyadh) is a Saudi football player who currently plays as a midfielder for Damac.
