= Trần Khoa Điển =

Vietnamese footballer (born 1987)

Personal information
- Full name: Trần Khoa Điển
- Date of birth: 25 February 1987 (age 39)
- Place of birth: Ho Chi Minh City, Vietnam
- Height: 1.85 m (6 ft 1 in)
- Position: Goalkeeper

Youth career
- 2000–2007: Cảng Sài Gòn

Senior career*
Years	Team	Apps	(Gls)
2008–2009	Cảng Sài Gòn	23	(0)
2009–2014	Hồ Chí Minh City	129	(0)
2015–2016	Đồng Tháp	145	(0)

International career
2008–2009	Vietnam U23	3	(0)
2009–2010	Vietnam	1	(0)
- * Club domestic league appearances and goals

Trần Khoa Điển (born 25 February 1987) is a Vietnamese former footballer who plays as a goalkeeper. He previously played for V.League 1 club Dong Thap FC.

== Career ==
Born and raised in Ho Chi Minh City, Khoa Dien joined the Cảng Sài Gòn youth team at the age of 12. He had a long time playing for Cảng Sài Gòn (also called as Hồ Chí Minh City FC) and 2 seasons with Dong Thap. In 2015, he suffered a serious injury on his head, which led him to retired in 2016.

In 2009, although playing in V.League 2, he was called up by coach Henrique Calisto to the U23 Vietnam national team in the 25th SEA Games.

== Honours ==
=== International ===
==== Vietnam Under-23 ====
- Merdeka Cup: 2008
- SEA Games Silver medal: 2009
