= Omar Al-Khodari =

Saudi Arabian footballer

Personal information
- Full name: Omar Sultan Al-Khodari
- Date of birth: August 26, 1990 (age 36)
- Place of birth: Saudi Arabia
- Height: 1.74 m (5 ft 8 1/2 in)
- Position: Striker

Youth career
- Al-Ittihad

Senior career*
Years	Team	Apps	(Gls)
2010–2013	Al-Ittihad	12	(2)
2013–2014	Al-Fateh	0	(0)
2014–2015	Al-Riyadh		
2015–2016	Al-Feiha FC		
2016–2017	Al-Nahda		
- * Club domestic league appearances and goals

Omar Al-Khodari (Arabic: عمر الخضري; born August 26, 1990) is a Saudi football player who plays as a striker. He played in the Pro League for Al-Ittihad.

== Honours ==
Al-Fateh SC

- Saudi Professional League: 2012–13
- Saudi Super Cup: 2013
