= Polawat Wangkahart =

Thai professional footballer (born 1987)

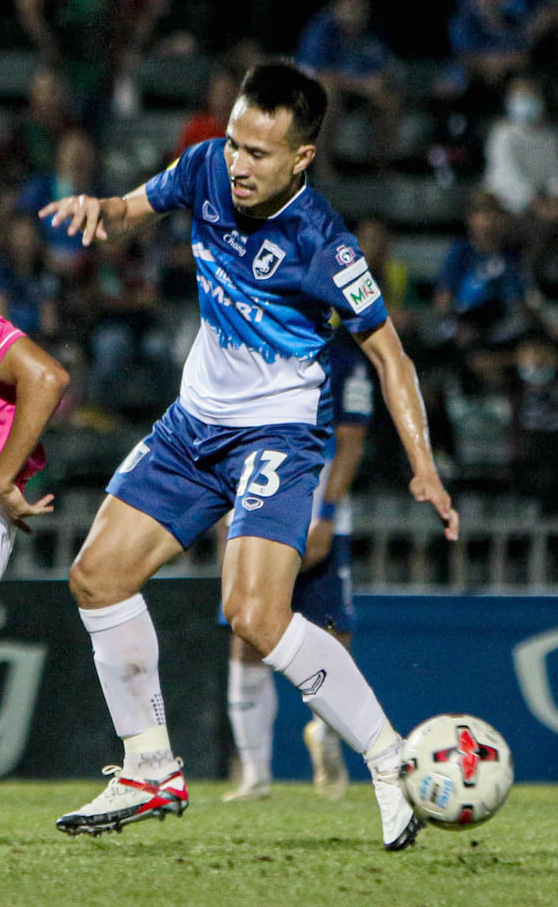
- Polawat Wangkahart playing for Phrae United

Personal information
- Full name: Polawat Wangkahart
- Date of birth: 27 July 1987 (age 39)
- Place of birth: Yasothon, Thailand
- Height: 1.67 m (5 ft 5 1/2 in)
- Position: Right back

Team information
- Current team: Lamphun Warrior
- Number: 2

Senior career*
Years	Team	Apps	(Gls)
2006–2008	Osotsapa	0	(0)
2009	Bangkok Glass	0	(0)
2010	TOT-CAT	0	(0)
2011	Chanthaburi	0	(0)
2011–2015	Suphanburi	55	(0)
2012	→ Muangthong United (loan)	6	(0)
2013	→ Nakhon Ratchasima (loan)	19	(0)
2016	Nakhon Ratchasima	24	(0)
2017	Suphanburi	1	(0)
2018–2019	Trat	12	(0)
2019–2021	Phrae United		
2021–	Lamphun Warrior		

International career
2009–2010	Thailand U23	4	(0)
2010–2011	Thailand	3	(0)
- * Club domestic league appearances and goals as of 12 September 2009

Polawat Wangkahart (Thai: พลวัฒน์ วังฆะฮาด, born July 27, 1987) is a Thai professional footballer who plays as a right back for Thai League 2 club Phrae United.

== International career ==
In September, 2010 he debut for Thailand in a friendly match against India.

=== International ===
As of 12 November 2015

National team	Year	Apps	Goals
Thailand	2010	2	0
Thailand	2011	1	0
Thailand	Total	3	0

== Honours ==
=== Club ===
Osotspa Saraburi

- Kor Royal Cup (1): 2007

Lamphun Warriors

- Thai League 2 (1): 2021–22
