= Anas Al-Jbarat =

Jordanian footballer

Personal information
- Full name: Anas Abdel-Salem Al-Jbarat
- Date of birth: February 24, 1989 (age 37)
- Place of birth: Amman, Jordan
- Height: 1.79 m (5 ft 10 in)
- Position: Central midfielder

Team information
- Current team: Al-Faisaly
- Number: 20

Senior career*
Years	Team	Apps	(Gls)
2009–2015	Shabab Al-Ordon		
2015–	Al-Faisaly		

International career^{‡}
2010–2011	Jordan U-23		
2016	Jordan	3	(0)
- * Club domestic league appearances and goals ‡ National team caps and goals as of 15 November 2016

Anas Abdel-Salem Al-Jbarat (Arabic: أنس عبد السالم الجبارات; born February 24, 1989) is a Jordanian football player who currently plays as a central midfielder for Al-Faisaly.

== International career ==
Al-Jbarat played his first match with the Jordan national senior team against Lebanon in an international friendly on 31 August 2016, which resulted in a draw 1-1.

== International career statistics ==
As of 15 November 2016

Jordan national team
Year	Apps	Goals
2016	4	0
Total	4	0
