= Komkrit Camsokchuerk =

Thai footballer (born 1989)

Personal information
- Full name: Komkrit Camsokchuerk
- Date of birth: 20 April 1989 (age 37)
- Place of birth: Roi Et, Thailand
- Height: 1.85 m (6 ft 1 in)
- Position: Centre back

Team information
- Current team: Kasetsart

Youth career
- 2005–2007: Assumption School

Senior career*
Years	Team	Apps	(Gls)
2008–2009	Bangkok United	22	(0)
2010	Roi Et United	14	(1)
2011–2016	Bangkok United	24	(0)
2014	→ Sisaket (loan)	13	(0)
2015	→ TTM Customs (loan)	8	(0)
2015	→ Saraburi (loan)	4	(0)
2016	→ Sisaket (loan)	21	(0)
2017	Suphanburi	0	(0)
2017	Thai Honda Ladkrabang	5	(0)
2018–	Chonburi	2	(0)
2018	→ Army United (loan)	16	(0)
2019–	→ Kasetsart (loan)		

International career
2008–2009	Thailand U19		
2011	Thailand U23		
- * Club domestic league appearances and goals as of 04:26, 27 September 2017 (UTC)

Komkrit Camsokchuerk (Thai: คมกริช คำโสกเชือก, born April 20, 1989), simply known as Nueng (Thai: หนึ่ง) is a Thai professional footballer who plays as a centre back for Thai League 2 club Kasetsart.
