= Saleh Al-Jawhari =

Jordanian footballer

Personal information
- Full name: Saleh Fayez Al-Jawhari
- Date of birth: 5 March 1989 (age 37)
- Place of birth: Amman, Jordan
- Height: 1.75 m (5 ft 9 in)
- Position: Forward

Youth career
- 2005–2007: Al-Jazeera

Senior career*
Years	Team	Apps	(Gls)
2007–2017	Al-Jazeera	134	(27)
2017–2018	Al-Wehdat		
2018	Hilal Al-Quds		
2018	Shabab Al-Ordon		
2018–2019	Al-Salt		
2019–2022	Al-Jazeera		

International career
2007–2008	Jordan U19		
2010–2011	Jordan U23		
2014–2016	Jordan	7	(0)
- * Club domestic league appearances and goals as of 19:31, 19 January 2021 (UTC)

Saleh Fayez Al-Jawhari (Arabic: صالح فايز الجوهري) is a retired Jordanian footballer.

== International career ==
Al-Jawhari played his first international match against Bahrain in the semifinals of the 2014 WAFF Championship in Doha, on 4 January 2014, which ended in a 1–0 victory for Jordan.

== Career statistics ==
=== International ===
As of 15 November 2016

Jordan national team
Year	Apps	Goals
2014	6	0
2016	1	0
Total	7	0

== Honors ==
=== International ===
Jordan

- WAFF Championship runner-up: 2014
