= Chalitpong Jantakul =

Thai footballer (born 1989)

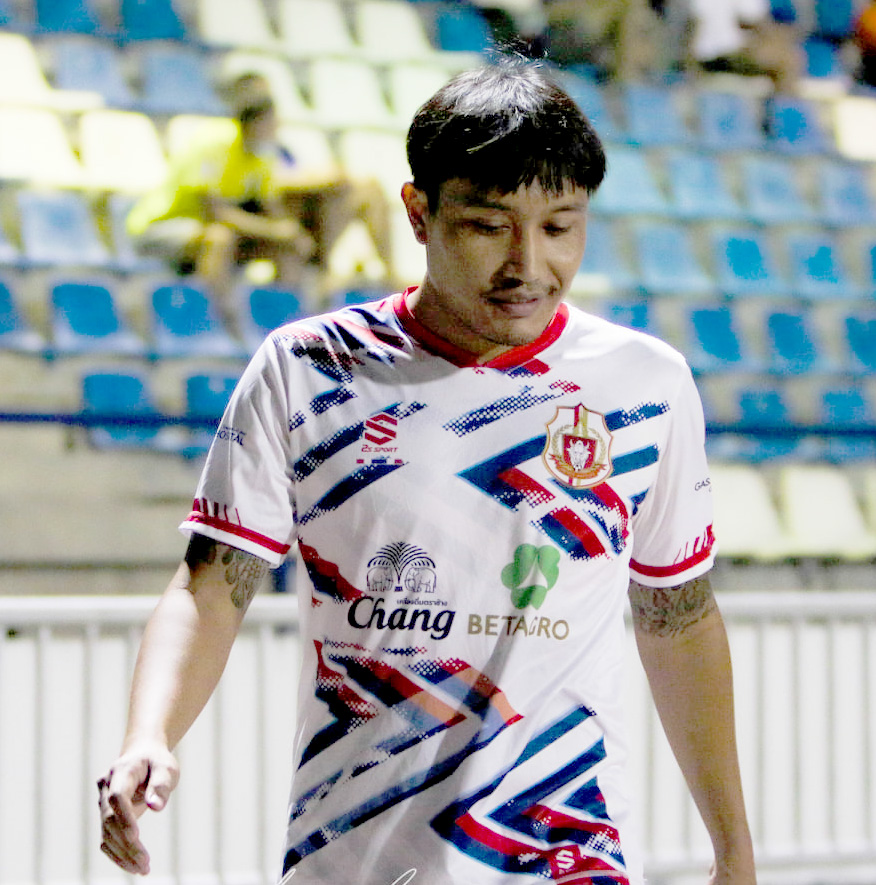
- Chalitpong Jantakul playing for Lamphun Warrior.

Personal information
- Full name: Chalitpong Jantakul
- Birth name: Sujarit Jantakul
- Date of birth: 4 March 1989 (age 37)
- Place of birth: Nakhon Ratchasima, Thailand
- Height: 1.80 m (5 ft 11 in)
- Position: Defender

Youth career
- 2006–2007: Chonburi

Senior career*
Years	Team	Apps	(Gls)
2008–2014	Sriracha	37	(4)
2013	→ Singhtarua (loan)	19	(1)
2014	Army United	13	(0)
2015–2016	PTT Rayong	26	(2)
2017	Sisaket	26	(0)
2018	Navy	10	(1)
2019	Simork	2	(0)
2019	Navy	9	(0)
2020–2021	Sisaket	22	(1)
2021–2022	Lamphun Warrior	3	(0)
2024–2025	Trat	19	(0)

International career
2008–2009	Thailand U19		
2009–2010	Thailand U23	7	(0)
2010	Thailand	1	(0)
- * Club domestic league appearances and goals as of 26 April 2025

Chalitpong Jantakul (Thai: ชลิตพงศ์ จันทกล; born 4 March 1989 is a Thai professional footballer who plays as a defender.

== International career ==
After defeating Palestine in the 1st preliminary round of the qualifiers for the 2012 London Olympics men's football tournament on penalties, the Thai national football team was disqualified for fielding an ineligible player, Jantakul, in the first leg. He had received a one-match suspension from the 2008 AFC U-19 Championship, and although he was listed as part of the team for the 2010 Asian Games men's football tournament (and sat out the first game as per the suspension), it was deemed that he had not served his suspension, as the Asian Games tournament was not sanctioned by the AFC. The Football Association of Thailand filed a complaint with the Court of Arbitration for Sport, but the complaint was ultimately rejected.

=== International ===
As of 12 November 2015

National team	Year	Apps	Goals
Thailand	2010	1	0
Thailand	Total	1	0

== Honours ==
=== Club ===
Sriracha

- Thai Division 1 League (1): 2010

Lamphun Warriors

- Thai League 2 (1): 2021–22
