= 2010–11 Al Ain FC season =

Al Ain FC
2010–11 season
- Chairman: Mohammed Bin Zayed
- Manager: (United Arab Emirates) Abdul Hameed Al Mistaki (until 20 Dec 2010) (Brazil) Alexandre Gallo (from 20 Dec 2010)
- Stadium: Khalifa International; Tahnoun bin Mohammed
- Pro-League: 10
- Presidents Cup: Round of 16
- Etisalat Cup: Runner-up
- Champions League: Group stage
- Top goalscorer: League: Omar Abdulrahman (8); All: José Sand (11)
- Highest home attendance: 7,498 (30 September vs Al Ahli, Pro-League)
- Lowest home attendance: 851 (30 December vs Al Dhafra, Etisalat Cup)
- Average home league attendance: 4,817 (14 February vs Al Nasr, Pro-League)
| Home colours | Away colours | Third colours |

The 2010–11 season was Al Ain Football Club's 43rd in existence and the club's 36th consecutive season in the top-level football league in the UAE.

Al Ain in this season will seek to win trophies, and competing in the Pro-League, the Champions League, the Presidents Cup, and the Etisalat Cup, after a frustrating season in 2009–10.

== Season overview ==
=== March ===
On 24 March, Al Ain, lost his second game in the second round against Al Sharjah, to Increases the pressure on the Board of Directors because of The club's position in the league. On 25 March, The Board of Directors resigned Shiekh Abdullah bin Mohammed bin Khalid Al Nahyan Has been appointed as the chairman of the Board of Directors, the membership of Rashid Mubarak Al Hajiri, Awad Hasoum Al Darmaki, Mohammed bin Abdullah bin Badwah, and Mohammed bin Obaid Al Daheri by Mohammed bin Zayed Al Nahyan On 31 March, Al Ain won after 209 days against arch-rivals Al Wahda.

== Club ==
=== Technical and administrative staff ===
| Position | Name |
|---|---|
| Head coach | (Brazil) Alexandre Gallo |
| Assistant coach | (Brazil) Maurício Copertino (United Arab Emirates) Ahmed Abdullah |
| Team Manager | (United Arab Emirates) Matar Obaid Al Sahbani |
| Team Administrator | (United Arab Emirates) Nasser Al Junaibi |
| Team Supervisor | (United Arab Emirates) Mohammed Obaid Hammad |
| Fitness coach | (Brazil) Francisco Ferreira (Brazil) Matheus Henrique |
| Goalkeeping coach | (Iraq) Amer Abdul Wahab |
| Physiotherapist | (Brazil) Guthemberg Soares (India) Shanavas Vettipandi (Brazil) Edimar Da Silva (Poland) Wiesław Sojka (Egypt) Abdelnasser Aljohny (Turkey) Deniz Ozay |
| Doctor | Tawfaiq Salman |
| Performance analyst | (England) Liam Weeks |
| Academy Director | (England) Wayne Harrison |

Last updated: 30 March 2011
Source: Al Ain FC

==== Technical staff changes ====
===== During the season =====
| Outgoing | Manner of departure | Date of vacancy | Replaced by | Date of appointment | Position in table |
|---|---|---|---|---|---|
| (United Arab Emirates) Abdulhameed Al Mistaki | Sacked | 20 December 2010 | (Brazil) Alexandre Gallo | 20 December 2010 | 10th |

==== Administrative staff ====
===== During the season =====
| Outgoing | Manner of departure | Date of vacancy | Replaced by | Date of appointment |
|---|---|---|---|---|
| (United Arab Emirates) Majed Al Owais | Sacked | 30 March 2011 | (United Arab Emirates) Matar Obaid Al Sahbani | 30 March 2011 |
| (United Arab Emirates) Sultan Rashed | Sacked | 30 March 2011 | (United Arab Emirates) Nasser Al Junaibi | 30 March 2011 |
| No outgoing | | | (United Arab Emirates) Mohammed Obaid Hammad | 30 March 2011 |

=== Board of directors ===
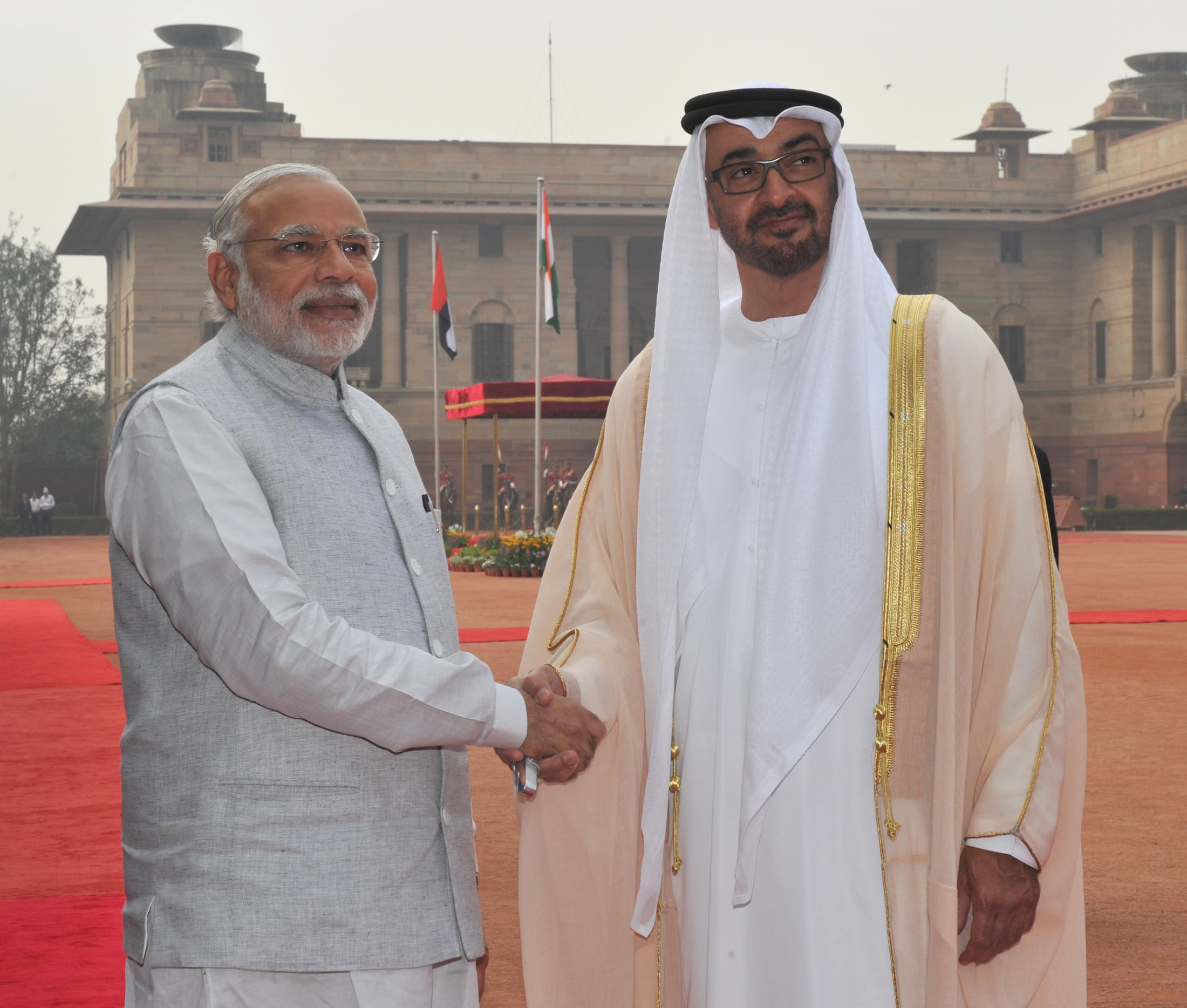
Mohammed Bin Zayed Al Nahyan, current President.

| Office | Name |
|---|---|
| President; Honorary Board President | Mohammed Bin Zayed Al Nahyan |
| First Deputy President; Honorary Board First Deputy President | Hazza bin Zayed Al Nahyan |
| Second Deputy President; Honorary Board Second Deputy President | Tahnoon Bin Zayed Al Nahyan |
| Chairman of Board of Directors | Abdullah bin Mohammed bin Khaled Al Nahyan |
| Vice Chairman of Board of Directors | Rashid bin Mubarak Al Hajri |
| Member of Board of Directors | Awad bin Hasom Al Darmaki |
| Member of Board of Directors | Mohammed Abdullah bin Bdouh |
| Member of Board of Directors | Mohammed bin Obaid Al Dhaheri |

Last updated: 26 March 2011
Source: Al Ain Club Official Website

==== Board changes ====
===== During the season =====
| Outgoing Member | Manner of departure | Date of vacancy | Replaced by | Date of appointment |
|---|---|---|---|---|
| Hazza bin Zayed Al Nahyan | Remain as First Deputy President; Honorary Board First Deputy President | 25 March 2011 | Abdullah bin Mohammed bin Khaled Al Nahyan | 25 March 2011 |
| Mohamed Mubarak bin Fadel Al Mazrouei | Resigned | 25 March 2011 | Rashid bin Mubarak Al Hajri | 26 March 2011 |
| Mohammed bin Thaaloob Al Derie | Resigned | 25 March 2011 | Awad bin Hasom Al Darmaki | 26 March 2011 |
| Hamad bin Mubarak Al Shamsi | Resigned | 25 March 2011 | Mohammed Abdullah bin Bdouh | 26 March 2011 |
| Mohammed Abdullah bin Hazam Al Dhaheri | Resigned | 25 March 2011 | Mohammed bin Obaid Al Dhaheri | 26 March 2011 |

=== Other information ===
| Ground (capacity and dimensions) | Tahnoun bin Mohammed Stadium (10,000 / ) |
| Ground (capacity and dimensions) | Sheikh Khalifa International Stadium (16,000 / ) |

=== Kits ===
| Home | Away | Third | 'Home ACL' | 'Away ACL' |

== Players ==
=== First Team ===
| No. | Position(s) | Nationality | Name | Since | Age | Signed from | Notes |
Goalkeepers
| 12 | GK | UAE | Waleed Salem | 2001 | 30 | Youth system | |
| 39 | GK | UAE | Ismail Rabee | 2011 | 28 | (United Arab Emirates) Al Nasr | |
| 55 | GK | UAE | Yousif Abdelrahman | 2009 | 22 | (United Arab Emirates) Ittihad Kalba | |
Defenders
| 4 | DF | UAE | Musallem Fayez | 2007 | 24 | Youth system | |
| 5 | DF | UAE | Ismail Ahmed | 2008 | 27 | (Morocco) FUS de Rabat | |
| 14 | DF | UAE | Mohammed Fayez | 2010 | 21 | Youth system | |
| 15 | DF | UAE | Khaled Abdulrahman | 2010 | 22 | Youth system | |
| 19 | DF | UAE | Mohanad Salem | 2008 | 26 | (United Arab Emirates) Al Dhafra | |
| 21 | DF | UAE | Fawzi Fayez | 2007 | 23 | Youth system | |
| 44 | DF | UAE | Fares Jumaa | 2007 | 22 | Youth system | |
| 77 | DF | UAE | Hazza Salem | 2010 | 22 | Youth system | |
Midfielders
| 6 | MF | CIV | Brahima Keita | 2010 | 26 | (Kuwait) Qadsia | (on loan from Qadsia) |
| 7 | MF | UAE | Ali Al-Wehaibi | 2001 | 27 | Youth system | (VC) |
| 8 | MF | UAE | Ahmed Al Shamisi | 2009 | 23 | Youth system | |
| 10 | MF | UAE | Omar Abdulrahman | 2008 | 19 | Youth system | |
| 11 | MF | UAE | Saif Mohammed | 2008 | 27 | (United Arab Emirates) Al Shaab | |
| 13 | MF | UAE | Rami Yaslam (C) | 2001 | 29 | Youth system | |
| 18 | MF | UAE | Abdullah Malallah | 2008 | 27 | (United Arab Emirates) Emirates | |
| 23 | MF | UAE | Shehab Ahmed | 2002 | 27 | Youth system | |
| 27 | MF | UAE | Salem Abdullah | 2006 | 24 | Youth system | |
| 38 | FW | BRA | Elias Ribeiro | 2011 | 27 | (Brazil) Atlético Goianiense | |
Forwards
| 2 | FW | UAE | Abdulaziz Fayez | 2009 | 20 | Youth system | |
| 9 | FW | ROU | Valentin Badea | 2011 | 28 | (Romania) Brașov | |
| 20 | FW | UAE | Mohamed Abdulrahman | 2008 | 22 | Youth system | |
| 99 | FW | UAE | Faisal Ali | 2001 | 29 | Youth system | |

=== From youth system ===
Note: Flags indicate national team as defined under FIFA eligibility rules; some limited exceptions apply. Players may hold more than one non-FIFA nationality.

| No. | Pos. | Nation | Player |
|---|---|---|---|
| 1 | GK | UAE | Saif Rashed |
| 3 | DF | UAE | Mohammed Ayed |
| 22 | GK | UAE | Sultan Musabah |
| 24 | MF | UAE | Saqer Mohammed |
| 26 | MF | UAE | Hamad Al Marri |
| 28 | FW | UAE | Faraj Jumaa |
| 29 | FW | CIV | Jumaa Saeed |
| 30 | GK | UAE | Abdullah Sultan |
| 31 | MF | UAE | Haddaf Al Ameri |

| No. | Pos. | Nation | Player |
|---|---|---|---|
| 32 | MF | UAE | Hamad Raqea |
| 33 | DF | UAE | Mohammed Al-Dhahri |
| 34 | MF | UAE | Sultan Nasser |
| 36 | GK | UAE | Dawoud Sulaiman |
| 43 | DF | UAE | Salem Sultan |
| 50 | GK | UAE | Abdulrazzaq Mohammed |
| 70 | MF | UAE | Bandar Al-Ahbabi |

== Transfers ==
=== In ===
| Date | Position | No. | Name | From | Type | Transfer window | Fee | Ref. |
|---|---|---|---|---|---|---|---|---|
| 1 July 2010 | FW | 33 | (Morocco) Soufiane Alloudi | (United Arab Emirates) Al Wasl | Loan return | Summer | Free | |
| 26 August 2010 | MF | 6 | (Ivory Coast) Brahima Keita | (Kuwait) Qadsia | Loan | Summer | €1,000,000 | |
| 8 January 2011 | MF | 38 | (Brazil) Elias Ribeiro (Note: On 14 September 2010, Al Ain announced that they had signed Elias, but the agreement have fallen through at the last minute due to player passport expired. Atlético Goianiense committed to Al Ain to not transfer the player to any club except them after the end of the Brazilian football season. On 8 January 2011, Elias joined Al Ain on a six-month deal.) | (Brazil) Atlético Goianiense | Loan | Winter | Undisclosed | |
| 15 January 2011 | MF | 80 | (Chile) Milovan Mirošević | (Chile) Universidad Católica | Transfer | Winter | €450,000 | |
| 25 January 2011 | GK | 50 | (United Arab Emirates) Ismail Rabee | (United Arab Emirates) Al Nasr | Transfer | Winter | Undisclosed | |
| 13 February 2011 | FW | 80 | (France) Jérémie Aliadière (Note: On 15 February, Al Ain stated that the player did not pass the medical examination due to cruciate ligament injury, but the player denounced that, stating that he reject the move because they been unprofessional.) | (England) Middlesbrough | Transfer | Winter | Undisclosed | |
| 22 February 2011 | FW | 9 | (Romania) Valentin Badea | (Romania) Brașov | Transfer | Winter | Free | |
| Total | | | | | | | €1,450,000 | |

=== Out ===
| Date | Position | No. | Name | To | Type | Transfer window | Fee | Ref. |
|---|---|---|---|---|---|---|---|---|
| 16 May 2010 | DF | 3 | (United Arab Emirates) Hilal Saeed | (United Arab Emirates) Al Nasr | Transfer | Summer | €1,700,000 | |
| 29 May 2010 | MF | 11 | (United Arab Emirates) Ahmed Moadhed | (United Arab Emirates) Al Ahli | Transfer | Summer | Undisclosed | |
| 14 June 2010 | FW | 8 | (Brazil) Emerson | (Brazil) Fluminense | Transfer | Summer | €700,000 | |
| 4 July 2010 | MF | 18 | (United Arab Emirates) Ahmed Khamis | (United Arab Emirates) Al Ahli | Transfer | Summer | Undisclosed | |
| 13 July 2010 | MF | – | (United Arab Emirates) Fadel Ishaq | (United Arab Emirates) Al Shaab | Loan | Summer | Undisclosed | |
| 13 July 2010 | FW | – | (United Arab Emirates) Naseeb Ishak | (United Arab Emirates) Al Shaab | Loan | Summer | Undisclosed | |
| 14 July 2010 | MF | – | (United Arab Emirates) Ahmad Khalfan | (United Arab Emirates) Emirates | Transfer | Summer | Free | |
| 26 July 2010 | MF | 10 | (Chile) Jorge Valdivia | (Brazil) Palmeiras | Transfer | Summer | €6,500,000 | |
| 9 August 2010 | MF | 50 | (South Korea) Lee Ho | (Japan) Omiya Ardija | Released | Summer | Free | |
| 13 August 2010 | FW | – | (United Arab Emirates) Nasser Khamis | (United Arab Emirates) Dubai | Transfer | Summer | Free | |
| 23 September 2010 | FW | 33 | (Morocco) Soufiane Alloudi | (Morocco) Raja Casablanca | Released | Summer | Free | |
| 29 January 2011 | FW | 9 | (Argentina) José Sand | (Spain) Deportivo La Coruña | Loan | Winter | €500,000 | |
| 15 February 2011 | MF | – | (Chile) Milovan Mirošević (Note: The club failed to finalize the deal because error in registration and loaned him to Universidad Católica until July.) | (Chile) Universidad Católica | Loan | Winter | Free | |
| Total | | | | | | | €9,400,000 | |

=== Transfer summary ===
Undisclosed fees are not included in the transfer totals.

Expenditure

Summer: ▼€1,000,000

Winter: ▼€450,000

Total: ▼€1,450,000

Income

Summer: ▲€8,900,000

Winter: ▲€500,000

Total: ▲€9,400,000

Net totals

Summer: ▼€7,900,000

Winter: ▼€50,000

Total: ▼€7,950,000

== Pre-season and friendlies ==
| 25 July 2010 Friendly | USK Anif (Austria) | 0–3 | (United Arab Emirates) Al Ain | Austria |
| 19:00 GMT+4 (UAE Time) | | Report | Sand 10'; Alloudi 27'; F. Ali 83' (pen.) | Stadium: USK Anif; Referee: (Austria) Riedel Ronald |

| 26 July 2010 Friendly | Puch (Austria) | 1–1 | (United Arab Emirates) Al Ain | Austria |
| 20:30 GMT+4 (UAE Time) | Huber 7' | Report | N. Khamis 22' | Stadium: FC Puch; Referee: (Austria) Mario Loghofer |

| 29 July 2010 Friendly | Fürth (Germany) | 7–2 | (United Arab Emirates) Al Ain | Germany |
| 19:00 GMT+4 (UAE Time) | Sararer 10'; Biliškov 28'; Schahin 51'; Onuegbu 58'; Haas 67'; Pektürk 73'; Nehrig 81' | Report | Sand 5', 43' (pen.) | Stadium: Ruhpolding; Referee: (Poland) Simon Skoroneski |

| 2 August 2010 Friendly | Concordia (Romania) | 3–1 | (United Arab Emirates) Al Ain | Austria |
| 20:30 GMT+4 (UAE Time) | Popa 13'; Trică 25'; Budeanu 38' | Report | J. Saeed 86' | Stadium: Bruck; Referee: (Austria) Martin Stone |

== Competitions ==
=== Overview ===
| Competition | First match | Last match | Starting round | Final position | Record | | | | | | | |
| Competition | First match | Last match | Starting round | Final position | Pld | W | D | L | GF | GA | GD | Win % |
|---|---|---|---|---|---|---|---|---|---|---|---|---|
| Pro League | 28 August 2010 | 5 June 2011 | Matchday 1 | 10 | 22 | 6 | 7 | 9 | 33 | 35 | −2 | 27.27 |
| League Cup | 9 October 2010 | 29 April 2011 | Group stage | Runner-up | 12 | 6 | 4 | 2 | 20 | 13 | +7 | 50.00 |
| President's Cup | 20 September 2010 | 9 February 2011 | First round | Round of 16 | 2 | 1 | 0 | 1 | 5 | 3 | +2 | 50.00 |
| Champions League | 19 February 2011 | 11 May 2011 | Play-off | Group stage | 7 | 3 | 1 | 3 | 8 | 9 | −1 | 42.86 |
| Total | | | | | 43 | 16 | 12 | 15 | 66 | 60 | +6 | 37.21 |

Last updated: 5 June 2011
Source: Competitions

=== Pro League ===
==== League table ====
| Pos | Team | Pld | W | D | L | GF | GA | GD | Pts | Qualification or relegation |
|---|---|---|---|---|---|---|---|---|---|---|
| 8 | Al Ahli | 22 | 7 | 6 | 9 | 30 | 42 | −12 | 27 | |
| 9 | Dubai | 22 | 8 | 2 | 12 | 33 | 48 | −15 | 26 | |
| 10 | Al Ain | 22 | 6 | 7 | 9 | 33 | 35 | −2 | 25 | |
| 11 | Ittihad Kalba (R) | 22 | 6 | 2 | 14 | 39 | 56 | −17 | 20 | Relegation to UAE Division 2 Group A |
| 12 | Al-Dhafra (R) | 22 | 3 | 4 | 15 | 27 | 50 | −23 | 13 | Relegation to UAE Division 2 Group A |

Source: UFL
Rules for classification: 1) points; 2) goal difference; 3) number of goals scored.
(R) Relegated

==== Results summary ====
| Overall | | | | | | | | Home | | | | | | Away | | | | | |
| Pld | W | D | L | GF | GA | GD | Pts | W | D | L | GF | GA | GD | W | D | L | GF | GA | GD |
|---|---|---|---|---|---|---|---|---|---|---|---|---|---|---|---|---|---|---|---|
| 22 | 6 | 7 | 9 | 33 | 35 | −2 | 25 | 3 | 5 | 3 | 17 | 16 | +1 | 3 | 2 | 6 | 16 | 19 | −3 |

Last updated: 5 June 2011.
Source: Competitive Matches

==== Results by round ====
| Round | 1 | 2 | 3 | 4 | 5 | 6 | 7 | 8 | 9 | 10 | 11 | 12 | 13 | 14 | 15 | 16 | 17 | 18 | 19 | 20 | 21 | 22 |
|---|---|---|---|---|---|---|---|---|---|---|---|---|---|---|---|---|---|---|---|---|---|---|
| Ground | H | A | H | A | H | A | H | A | H | A | H | A | H | A | H | A | H | A | H | A | H | A |
| Result | W | W | D | D | L | L | D | D | L | L | D | L | L | L | W | W | D | W | D | L | W | L |
| Position | 5 | 1 | 1 | 3 | 7 | 8 | 8 | 8 | 8 | 9 | 10 | 11 | 11 | 11 | 10 | 10 | 10 | 9 | 10 | 10 | 10 | 10 |

Updated to match(es) played on 5 June 2011. Source: AlAinFC.ae
A = Away; H = Home; W = Win; D = Draw; L = Loss

==== Matches ====
| 28 August 2010 1 | Al Ain | 4–3 | Dubai | Al Ain |
| 22:00 GMT+4 (UAE Time) | M. Salem (yellow card) 2'; Keita (yellow card) 20'; Sand 30', 45' (yellow card) 89'; O. Abdulrahman 34'; A. Fayez 70'; M. Abdulrahman (yellow card) 90+3' | Report; Live TV: Abu Dhabi Sports; Dubai Sports | Laurent (yellow card) 7' (goal) 16', 50'; Anbar (yellow card) 19'; J. Khater (yellow card) 44'; Tiberkanine 76' | Stadium: Tahnoun bin Mohammed; Attendance: 7,153; Referee: Hamad Al Shaikh |

| 3 September 2010 2 | Al Nasr | 0–3 | Al Ain | Dubai |
| 22:00 GMT+4 (UAE Time) | M. Ali (yellow card) 11'; Tenorio (yellow card) 23'; M. Hassan (yellow card) 63'; B. Yaqoot (yellow card) 81' | (Report); Live TV: Abu Dhabi Sports; Dubai Sports | Musallem. F (yellow card) 23'; Sand 52', 90+2'; M. Abdulrahman (yellow card) 64'; A. Fayez 87' | Stadium: Al Maktoum; Attendance: 4,972; Referee: Ali Hamad |

| 17 September 2010 3 | Al Ain | 1–1 | Sharjah | Al Ain |
| 17:30 | Sand (yellow card) 28' (goal) 42' (pen.) | (Report); Live TV: Abu Dhabi Sports; Dubai Sports | (yellow card) 28' F.Jumah; Marcelinho 80' (pen.); (red card) 36' Al Mas | Stadium: Tahnoun bin Mohammed; Attendance: 4,970; Referee: Ammar Al-Jeneibi |

| 25 September 2010 4 | Al Wahda | 0–0 | Al Ain | Abu Dhabi |
| 20:00 | Matar (yellow card) 48'; Al Kamali (yellow card) 52' | (Report); Live TV: Abu Dhabi Sports; Dubai Sports | (yellow card) 23' Sand; (yellow card) 28' F.Fayez; (yellow card) 81' Sultan; (yellow card) 90' Saif | Stadium: Al Nahyan; Attendance: 11,913; Referee: Mohammed Abdullah |

| 30 September 2010 5 | Al Ain | 1–2 | Al Ahli | Al Ain |
| 20:00 | Amoory 37' (pen.); Musalam (yellow card) 62'; Saif (yellow card) 76' | (Report); Live TV: Abu Dhabi Sports; Dubai Sports | (yellow card) 36' Al Taweela; (yellow card) 75' Qassim; 79' Pinga; 81' F.Khalil; (yellow card) 88' Mathaad; (yellow card) 89' Cannavaro | Stadium: Tahnoun bin Mohammed; Attendance: 7,498; Referee: Fareed Ali |

| 16 October 2010 6 | Baniyas | 3–0 | Al Ain | Abu Dhabi |
| 20:00 | Senghor 37', 64'; Bashir 62' | (Report); Live TV: Abu Dhabi Sports; Dubai Sports | | Stadium: Baniyas; Attendance: 4,656; Referee: Ali Hamad |

| 22 October 2010 7 | Al Ain | 1–1 | Al Dhafra | Al Ain |
| 17:00 | Sand 70' (pen.); Mohammed (yellow card) 60'; Saif (yellow card) 86' | (Report); Live TV: Abu Dhabi Sports; Dubai Sports | 23' Kabi; (yellow card) 34' Hareb; (yellow card) 39' Al Yassi; (yellow card) 98' Al Tamimi; (yellow card) 90+4' Berrabah | Stadium: Tahnoun bin Mohammed; Attendance: 4,165; Referee: Mohamed Abdelkarim |

| 27 October 2010 8 | Al Wasl | 2–2 | Al Ain | Dubai |
| 20:00 | Yeste 16', 80' (pen.); Oliveira (yellow card) 47' | (Report); Live TV: Abu Dhabi Sports; Dubai Sports | 54' (yellow card) 75' J.Saeed; 64' Mohanad; (yellow card) 69' Shehab; (yellow card) 79' I. Ahmed | Stadium: Zabeel; Attendance: 8,695; Referee: Mohammed Abdullah |

| 12 December 2010 9 | Al Ain | 1–4 | Ittihad Kalba | Al Ain |
| 18:15 | J.Saeed 4'; Sand (yellow card) 19'; Haddaf (yellow card) 69' | (Report); Live TV: Abu Dhabi Sports; Dubai Sports | 54' Dufrennes; 55', 76' Jasim; (yellow card) 65' Essa; 87' Feindouno | Stadium: Tahnoun bin Mohammed; Attendance: 1,482; Referee: Ibrahim Al Muhairi |

| 19 December 2010 10 | Al Jazira | 4–0 | Al Ain | Abu Dhabi |
| 20:30 | Baré 6' (pen.), 42', 78'; A.Jumaa 29'; Y.Matar (yellow card) 34'; Mousa (yellow card) 50'; Delgado (yellow card) 50'; Subait (yellow card) 55' | (Report); Live TV: Abu Dhabi Sports; Dubai Sports | (yellow card) 49' I. Ahmed; (yellow card) 55' Sand; (yellow card) 81' Al Ahbabi | Stadium: Mohammed bin Zayed; Attendance: 19,398; Referee: Ali Hamad |

| 23 December 2010 11 | Al Ain | 1–1 | Al Shabab | Al Ain |
| 18:10 | Sand (yellow card) 17' (goal) 63'; Saif (yellow card) 78' | (Report); Live TV: Abu Dhabi Sports; Dubai Sports | (red card) 32' Abbas; 35' (yellow card) 48' Dawoud; (yellow card) 75' Haykal; (yellow card) 90+3' Villanueva | Stadium: Tahnoun bin Mohammed; Attendance: 2,260; Referee: Mohammed Abdullah |

| 3 February 2011 12 | Dubai | 1–0 | Al Ain | Dubai |
| 17:20 | Abdulrahman (yellow card) 35'; Mohammad 64'; Anbar (yellow card) 67' | (Report); Live TV: Abu Dhabi Sports; Dubai Sports | (yellow card) 67' Al Wehaibi; (yellow card) 82' Keita | Stadium: Al Aweer; Attendance: 925; Referee: Ammar Al-Jeneibi |

| 14 February 2011 13 | Al Ain | 1–2 | Al Nasr | Al Ain |
| 17:30 | Musalam (red card) 33'; Elias 34'; Haddaf (yellow card) 79' | (Report); Live TV: Abu Dhabi Sports; Dubai Sports | 27' Bangoura; 68' Careca; (red card) 77' Darwish; (yellow card) 84' Khamis; (yellow card) 90+2' Ibrahim | Stadium: Tahnoun bin Mohammed; Attendance: 4,817; Referee: Mohammed Abdullah |

| 24 March 2011 14 | Sharjah | 2–1 | Al Ain | Sharjah |
| 20:30 | Marcelo 53' (pen.), 57'; N. Mubarak (yellow card) 87' | (Report); Live TV: Abu Dhabi Sports; Dubai Sports | (yellow card) 52' M. Salem; 73' F. Jumaa | Stadium: Sharjah; Attendance: 2,337; Referee: Fahad Al-Kassar |

| 31 March 2011 15 | Al Ain | 2–0 | Al Wahda | Al Ain |
| 17:50 | Elias 27' (pen.), 59'; Yaslam (yellow card) 30'; Badea (yellow card) 56' | (Report); Live TV: Abu Dhabi Sports; Dubai Sports | (yellow card) 25' Al Shehhi; (yellow card) 40' Ameen; (yellow card) 85' Magrão; (yellow card) 90+2' Bashir | Stadium: Tahnoun bin Mohammed; Attendance: 7,129; Referee: Ali Hamad |

| 24 April 2011 17 | Al Ain | 1–1 | Baniyas | Al Ain |
| 20:45 | Elias (yellow card) 44'; Keita (yellow card) 67'; Ismail. A 90+3' | (Report); Live TV: Abu Dhabi Sports; Dubai Sports | (yellow card) 75' M. Jaber | Stadium: Tahnoun bin Mohammed; Attendance: 5,322; Referee: Mohammed Abdullah |

| 8 May 2011 16 | Al Ahli | 0–4 | Al Ain | Dubai |
| 18:10 | | (Report); Live TV: Abu Dhabi Sports; Dubai Sports | 27' Omar. A 34' Al Wehaibi; (yellow card) 38' Hazza; (yellow card) 75' Musallem; 82' Shehab; 90+3' Elias | Stadium: Rashid; Attendance: 2,117; Referee: Hamad Al Shaikh |

| 16 May 2011 18 | Al Dhafra | 0–3 | Al Ain | Abu Dhabi |
| 18:20 | Basulaiman (yellow card) 31'; Al Musaabi (yellow card) 70'; Khairi (yellow card) 73' | (Report); Live TV: Abu Dhabi Sports; Dubai Sports | (yellow card) 38' Keita; (yellow card) 80' M. Salem; 21', 50' Mohamed. A 86' Omar. A | Stadium: Al Dhafra; Attendance: 739; Referee: Mohamed Abdelkarim |

| 20 May 2011 19 | Al Ain | 0–0 | Al Wasl | Al Ain |
| 21:00 | M. Salem (yellow card) 86' | (Report); Live TV: Abu Dhabi Sports; Dubai Sports | (yellow card) 66' A. Yousif; (yellow card) 69' Al Sheiba | Stadium: Tahnoun bin Mohammed; Attendance: 3,598; Referee: Ammar Al-Jeneibi |

| 28 May 2011 20 | Ittihad Kalba | 4–3 | Al Ain | Kalba |
| 19:50 | J. Sanqoor (yellow card) 14'; Dufrennes 22', 58'; R. Malullah (yellow card) 39' (goal) 48'; Kanú (yellow card) 74'; Deyaa (yellow card) 87'; Moftah (yellow card) 88'; Malallah (yellow card) 89' | (Report); Live TV: Abu Dhabi Sports; Dubai Sports | (yellow card) 24' Yaslam; 28' Mohamed. A (yellow card) 35' (yellow-red card) 44' Keita; 40', 85' Omar. A (yellow card) 73' Ayed; (yellow card) 74' Ismail; (yellow card) 76' Al Wehaibi; (yellow card) 76' J. Saeed; (yellow card) 88' Musallem | Stadium: Ittihad Kalba; Attendance: 901; Referee: Ali Hamad |

| 1 June 2011 21 | Al Ain | 4–1 | Al Jazira | Al Ain |
| 19:50 | Omar. A 6', 36'; J. Saeed 48' (yellow card) 86'; Elias 74' (yellow card) 90+1' | (Report); Live TV: Abu Dhabi Sports; Dubai Sports | (yellow card) 9' Ali Khasif; 41' R. Oliveira; (yellow card) 89' Ali Mabkhout; (yellow card) 14' (yellow-red card) 92' Mousa | Stadium: Tahnoun bin Mohammed; Attendance: 6,058; Referee: Hamad Al Shaikh |

| 5 June 2011 22 | Al Shabab | 3–0 | Al Ain | Dubai |
| 19:55 | Ahmed (yellow card) 34'; Ciel 47', 65'; Essa 72'; Darwish (yellow card) 90+1' | (Report); Live TV: Abu Dhabi Sports; Dubai Sports | (yellow card) 4' Bandar; (yellow card) 39' Musallem; (yellow card) 89' Al Merri | Stadium: Maktoum bin Rashid Al Maktoum; Attendance: 353; Referee: Abdullah Al Ajel |

=== President's Cup ===
| 20 September 2010 First round | Al Ain | 5–0 | Masfout | Dubai |
| 20:15 | Amoory 24'; Mohanad 62'; Shehab 79'; Al Merri 82'; Al-Shamsi 85' | Report; Live TV: Abu Dhabi Sports; Dubai Sports | (yellow card) 15' (yellow-red card) 41' S. Ali; (yellow card) 6' Ablaye | Stadium: Al Aweer; Referee: Abdullah Naji |

| 9 February 2011 Round of 16 | Masafi | 3–0^{1} | Al Ain | Dubai |
| | Fahad (yellow card) 12'; Yacob (yellow card) 76' | | (yellow card) 34' Elias; (yellow card) 90+3' Al Marri | Stadium: Al Maktoum; Referee: Yaqoub Al Hammadi |

Notes

- Note 1: Al Ain were found to have used an ineligible player and were disqualified, Masafi went through.

=== AFC Champions League ===
==== Qualifying play-off ====
| 19 February 2011 | Sriwijaya (Indonesia) | 0–4 | (United Arab Emirates) Al-Ain | Jakabaring Stadium, Palembang |
| 15:30 UTC+07:00 | Mahadirga (yellow card) 7'; Rotinsulu (yellow card) 45+3'; Satria (yellow card) 50'; Gathuessi (yellow card) 90+3' | Report | H. Al Ameri 13' (yellow card) 13'; Elias (yellow card) 29' (goal) 45+4' (pen.), 53'; H. Salem (yellow card) 36'; O. Abdulrahman (yellow card) 45+2' (goal) 50' (pen.) | Attendance: 12,000; Referee: Masaaki Toma (Japan) |

==== Group stage ====
| Pos | Team | Pld | W | D | L | GF | GA | GD | Pts | Qualification | SEO | NAG | AIN | HAN |
|---|---|---|---|---|---|---|---|---|---|---|---|---|---|---|
| 1 | (South Korea) FC Seoul | 6 | 3 | 2 | 1 | 9 | 4 | +5 | 11 | Advance to knockout stage | — | 0–2 | 3–0 | 3–0 |
| 2 | (Japan) Nagoya Grampus | 6 | 3 | 1 | 2 | 9 | 6 | +3 | 10 | Advance to knockout stage | 1–1 | — | 4–0 | 1–0 |
| 3 | (United Arab Emirates) Al-Ain | 6 | 2 | 1 | 3 | 4 | 9 | −5 | 7 | | 0–1 | 3–1 | — | 1–0 |
| 4 | (China) Hangzhou Greentown | 6 | 1 | 2 | 3 | 3 | 6 | −3 | 5 | | 1–1 | 2–0 | 0–0 | — |

Source: Stats.The-AFC.com

| 2 March 2011 | Al Ain (United Arab Emirates) | 0–1 | (South Korea) FC Seoul | Al Ain, United Arab Emirates |
| 19:05 UTC+04:00 | | Report | 25' Damjanović; (yellow card) 48' Ko Yo-Han; (yellow card) 64' Kim Dong-Jin | Stadium: Tahnoun bin Mohammed; Attendance: 5,128; Referee: Alireza Faghani (Iran) |

| 6 April 2011 | Hangzhou Greentown (China) | 0–0 | (United Arab Emirates) Al Ain | Hangzhou, China |
| 20:00 UTC+08:00 | Du Wei (yellow card) 62' | Report | (yellow card) 52' Omar. A (yellow card) 90+3' Rabee | Stadium: Zheijiang Dragon; Attendance: 26,973; Referee: Saeed Mozaffarizadeh (Iran) |

| 12 April 2011^{1} | Nagoya Grampus (Japan) | 4–0 | (United Arab Emirates) Al Ain | Nagoya, Japan |
| 19:00 UTC+09:00 | Kanazaki 27', 45+1' (yellow card) 55'; Keita 61' (o.g.); Fujimoto 77'; Yoshida (yellow card) 86' | Report | (red card) 76' Fares | Stadium: Mizuho Athletic; Attendance: 5,914; Referee: Subkhiddin Mohd Salleh (Malaysia) |

| 19 April 2011 | Al Ain (United Arab Emirates) | 1–0 | (China) Hangzhou Greentown | Al Ain, United Arab Emirates |
| 19:30 UTC+04:00 | Omar. A 60' (yellow card) 61' | Report | (yellow card) 54' Vázquez; (yellow card) 57' Mamatil | Stadium: Tahnoun bin Mohammed; Attendance: 2,324; Referee: Valentin Kovalenko (Uzbekistan) |

| 4 May 2011 | FC Seoul (South Korea) | 3–0 | (United Arab Emirates) Al Ain | Seoul, South Korea |
| 20:00 UTC+09:00 | Ko Yo-Han 16'; Damjanović 39', 72'; Lee Kyu-Ro (yellow card) 55'; Ha Dae-Sung (yellow card) 61' | Report | (yellow card) 15' Ayed; (yellow card) 45' Al Merri; (yellow card) 29' Mohamed. A | Stadium: Seoul World Cup; Attendance: 23,623; Referee: Abdullah Balideh (Qatar) |

| 11 May 2011 | Al Ain (United Arab Emirates) | 3–1 | (Japan) Nagoya Grampus | Al Ain, United Arab Emirates |
| 19:40 UTC+04:00 | Al Merri 21'; Elias 39', 50' (pen.); Khaled. A (yellow card) 54' | Report | 49' Fujimoto; (yellow card) 49' Matsuo | Stadium: Tahnoun bin Mohammed; Attendance: 892; Referee: Muhsen Basma (Syria) |

Notes

- Note 1: Nagoya Grampus v Al-Ain postponed from 15 March 2011 to 12 April 2011 due to earthquake in Japan.

=== League Cup ===
==== Group stage ====
| Team | Pld | W | D | L | GF | GA | GD | Pts |
|---|---|---|---|---|---|---|---|---|
| Al Ain | 10 | 5 | 4 | 1 | 15 | 8 | +7 | 19 |
| Al Wahda | 10 | 5 | 2 | 3 | 12 | 9 | +3 | 17 |
| Al Dhafra | 10 | 4 | 3 | 3 | 15 | 15 | 0 | 15 |
| Al Nasr | 10 | 3 | 3 | 4 | 11 | 13 | −2 | 12 |
| Dubai | 10 | 2 | 4 | 4 | 21 | 21 | 0 | 10 |
| Bani Yas | 10 | 2 | 2 | 6 | 10 | 19 | −9 | 8 |

Source: UAEProLeague.com

| 9 October 2010 1 | Al Wahda | 0–2 | Al Ain | Abu Dhabi |
| 17:20 | T. Abdullah (yellow card) 50'; B. Saeed (yellow card) 55' | Report | R. Yaslam (yellow card) 25'; Sand 53'; Al-Ahbabi 90'; Raqea (yellow card) 90+1' | Stadium: Al Nahyan; Attendance: 1,935; Referee: Ibrahim Al Muhairi |

| 4 November 2010 2 | Al Ain | 1–1 | Dubai | Al Ain |
| 16:55 | Sand 60'; Keita (yellow card) 85' | Report | N'dri 48'; J. Abdallah (yellow card) 87' | Stadium: Tahnoun bin Mohammed; Attendance: 1,543; Referee: Abdulwahid Qhater |

| 13 November 2010 3 | Al Ain | 0–0 | Baniyas | Al Ain |
| 20:00 | I. Ahmed (yellow card) 62' | Report | S. Idrees (yellow card) 23'; Senghor (yellow card) 62'; T. Mohammed (yellow card) 64'; Zahran (red card) 73'; Éder (yellow card) 75'; F. Ismail (yellow card) 77' | Stadium: Tahnoun bin Mohammed; Attendance: 1,321; Referee: Hamad Al Shaikh |

| 20 November 2010 4 | Al Dhafra | 1–3 | Al Ain | Abu Dhabi |
| 17:00 | M. Qasem (yellow card) 20'; A. Abdullah (yellow card) 29'; Tawfeeq 45+1'; Kabi (yellow card) 68'; Y. Abdullah (yellow card) 82' | Report | J. Saeed 32', 86'; H. Al Ameri 64'; Keita (yellow card) 75'; S. Ahmed (yellow card) 90+3' | Stadium: Hamdan Bin Zayed; Attendance: 408; Referee: Ali Hamad |

| 26 November 2010 5 | Al Ain | 1–1 | Al Nasr | Al Ain |
| 20:00 | Al Ahbabi 11'; Al-Shamsi (yellow card) 85'; Keita (yellow card) 87'; I. Ahmed (yellow card) 90+3' | (Report); Live TV: Abu Dhabi Sports; Dubai Sports | (yellow card) 76' Sabil; 83' Khamis | Stadium: Tahnoun bin Mohammed; Attendance: 1,207; Referee: Ammar Al-Jeneibi |

| 2 December 2010 6 | Al Nasr | 0–2 | Al Ain | Dubai |
| 16:45 | (yellow card) 61' Ahmed | (Report); Live TV: Abu Dhabi Sports; Dubai Sports | Haddaf 15'; Sand 42'; I. Ahmed (yellow card) 85' | Stadium: Al Maktoum; Attendance: 412; Referee: Mohamed Abdelkarim |

| 30 December 2010 7 | Al Ain | 3–2 | Al Dhafra | Al Ain |
| 16:55 | Musalam (yellow card) 19'; Malallah (yellow card) 42'; Keita 47' (pen.); Saif 50'; J.Saeed 75' | (Report); Live TV: Abu Dhabi Sports; Dubai Sports | 36' Kabi; (yellow card) 61' Al Saadi; (yellow card) 65' Basulaiman; (yellow card) 69' H.Al Hammadi | Stadium: Tahnoun bin Mohammed; Attendance: 851; Referee: Abdullah Al Zaabi |

| 7 January 2011 8 | Baniyas | 1–1 | Al Ain | Abu Dhabi |
| 18:35 | Bashir 59' (pen.); S.Mubarak (yellow card) 73' | (Report); Live TV: Abu Dhabi Sports; Dubai Sports | (yellow card) 18' Hazaa; (yellow card) 58' I. Ahmed; 69' Sand | Stadium: Baniyas Stadium; Attendance: 568; Referee: Adel Al Naqbi |

| 14 January 2011 9 | Dubai | 1–2 | Al Ain | Dubai |
| 18:35 | Kazim (yellow card) 50'; Camara 53' | Report; Live TV: Abu Dhabi Sports; Dubai Sports | 44' (yellow card) 89' Saif; (yellow card) 61' Khaled; 69' Al Ahbabi; (yellow card) 70' J.Saeed; (yellow card) 83' Mohanad; (yellow card) 90+3' Malallah | Stadium: Al Aweer; Attendance: 250; Referee: Yaqoub Al Hammadi |

| 21 January 2011 10 | Al Ain | 0–1 | Al Wahda | Al Ain |
| 18:40 | | (Report); Live TV: Abu Dhabi Sports; Dubai Sports | 90+3' Ameen; (yellow card) 34' T. Al Junaibi | Stadium: Tahnoun bin Mohammed; Attendance: 1,362; Referee: Eisa Al Hajri |

==== Semi-finals ====
| 10 March 2011 | Al Ain | 3–2 | Al Wasl | Abu Dhabi |
| 20:30 GMT+4 (UAE Time) | F. Fayez (yellow card) 15'; I. Ahmed 50'; F. Jumaa (yellow card) 62'; Keita 67'; Elias 89' | Report | I. Ali 23' (yellow card) 88'; F. Ahmad (yellow card) 39'; Yeste 51'; Oliveira (yellow card) 59'; W. Ismail (yellow card) 86' | Stadium: Al Nahyan; Attendance: 1,871; Referee: Ibrahim Al Muhairi |

==== Final ====
| 29 April 2011 | Al Ain | 2–3 | Al Shabab | Abu Dhabi |
| 19:35 (GMT+4) | E. Dhahi 18' (o.g.); Al-Dhahri (yellow card) 61'; J. Saeed 90+1' | Report | Villanueva (yellow card) 52'; E. Obaid (yellow card) 71'; César 87'; W. Abbas (yellow card) 88'; Ciel 70', 90+3' | Stadium: Mohammad bin Zayed; Attendance: 8,027; Referee: Ali Hamad |

== Statistics ==
=== Squad appearances and goals ===
Last updated on 5 June 2011.

| No. | Pos | Nat | Player | Total | | Pro-League | | League Cup | | President's Cup | | Champions League | |
| No. | Pos | Nat | Player | Apps | Goals | Apps | Goals | Apps | Goals | Apps | Goals | Apps | Goals |
Goalkeepers
| 1 | GK | (United Arab Emirates) UAE | Saif Rashed | 0 | 0 | 0 | 0 | 0 | 0 | 0 | 0 | 0 | 0 |
| 12 | GK | (United Arab Emirates) UAE | Waleed Salem | 6 | 0 | 3 | 0 | 2 | 0 | 0 | 0 | 1 | 0 |
| 22 | GK | (United Arab Emirates) UAE | Sultan Musabah | 0 | 0 | 0 | 0 | 0 | 0 | 0 | 0 | 0 | 0 |
| 30 | GK | (United Arab Emirates) UAE | Abdullah Sultan | 7 | 0 | 5 | 0 | 1 | 0 | 1 | 0 | 0 | 0 |
| 36-1(ِACL) | GK | (United Arab Emirates) UAE | Dawoud Sulaiman | 24 | 0 | 11 | 0 | 9 | 0 | 1 | 0 | 3 | 0 |
| 39 | GK | (United Arab Emirates) UAE | Ismail Rabee | 7 | 0 | 4 | 0 | 0 | 0 | 0 | 0 | 3 | 0 |
| 55 | GK | (United Arab Emirates) UAE | Yousif Abdelrahman | 1 | 0 | 1 | 0 | 0 | 0 | 0 | 0 | 0 | 0 |
Defenders
| 3 | DF | (United Arab Emirates) UAE | Mohammed Ayed | 7 | 0 | 2 | 0 | 3 | 0 | 0 | 0 | 2 | 0 |
| 4 | DF | (United Arab Emirates) UAE | Musallem Fayez | 29 | 0 | 17 | 0 | 5 | 0 | 1 | 0 | 6 | 0 |
| 5 | DF | (United Arab Emirates) UAE | Ismail Ahmed | 27 | 2 | 14 | 1 | 9 | 1 | 0 | 0 | 4 | 0 |
| 14 | DF | (United Arab Emirates) UAE | Mohammed Fayez | 2 | 0 | 2 | 0 | 0 | 0 | 0 | 0 | 0 | 0 |
| 15 | DF | (United Arab Emirates) UAE | Khaled Abdulrahman | 10 | 0 | 1 | 0 | 6 | 0 | 0 | 0 | 3 | 0 |
| 19 | DF | (United Arab Emirates) UAE | Mohanad Salem | 21 | 2 | 9 | 1 | 8 | 0 | 1 | 1 | 3 | 0 |
| 21 | DF | (United Arab Emirates) UAE | Fawzi Fayez | 17 | 0 | 9 | 0 | 5 | 0 | 2 | 0 | 1 | 0 |
| 33 | DF | (United Arab Emirates) UAE | Mohammed Al-Dhahri | 14 | 0 | 8 | 0 | 2 | 0 | 0 | 0 | 4 | 0 |
| 17(ِACL)-77 | DF | (United Arab Emirates) UAE | Hazza Salem | 27 | 0 | 10 | 0 | 11 | 0 | 2 | 0 | 4 | 0 |
| 44 | DF | (United Arab Emirates) UAE | Fares Jumaa | 25 | 2 | 16 | 2 | 3 | 0 | 2 | 0 | 4 | 0 |
Midfielders
| 6 | MF | (Ivory Coast) CIV | Brahima Keita | 31 | 2 | 15 | 0 | 10 | 2 | 0 | 0 | 6 | 0 |
| 7 | MF | (United Arab Emirates) UAE | Ali Al-Wehaibi | 27 | 1 | 17 | 1 | 3 | 0 | 2 | 0 | 5 | 0 |
| 8 | MF | (United Arab Emirates) UAE | Ahmed Al Shamisi | 11 | 1 | 4 | 0 | 3 | 0 | 2 | 1 | 2 | 0 |
| 10 | MF | (United Arab Emirates) UAE | Omar Abdulrahman | 29 | 11 | 21 | 8 | 1 | 0 | 2 | 1 | 5 | 2 |
| 11 | MF | (United Arab Emirates) UAE | Saif Mohammed | 23 | 2 | 12 | 0 | 8 | 2 | 2 | 0 | 1 | 0 |
| 13 | MF | (United Arab Emirates) UAE | Rami Yaslam | 30 | 0 | 16 | 0 | 9 | 0 | 1 | 0 | 4 | 0 |
| 18 | MF | (United Arab Emirates) UAE | Abdullah Malallah | 9 | 0 | 2 | 0 | 6 | 0 | 0 | 0 | 1 | 0 |
| 23 | MF | (United Arab Emirates) UAE | Shehab Ahmed | 25 | 2 | 13 | 1 | 9 | 0 | 1 | 1 | 2 | 0 |
| 24 | MF | (United Arab Emirates) UAE | Saqer Mohammed | 6 | 0 | 6 | 0 | 0 | 0 | 0 | 0 | 0 | 0 |
| 26 | MF | (United Arab Emirates) UAE | Hamad Al Marri | 19 | 2 | 8 | 0 | 5 | 0 | 2 | 1 | 4 | 1 |
| 27 | MF | (United Arab Emirates) UAE | Salem Abdullah | 0 | 0 | 0 | 0 | 0 | 0 | 0 | 0 | 0 | 0 |
| 28 | MF | (United Arab Emirates) UAE | Faraj Jumaa | 6 | 0 | 1 | 0 | 5 | 0 | 0 | 0 | 0 | 0 |
| 32 | MF | (United Arab Emirates) UAE | Hamad Raqea | 0 | 0 | 0 | 0 | 0 | 0 | 0 | 0 | 0 | 0 |
| 34 | MF | (United Arab Emirates) UAE | Sultan Nasser | 3 | 0 | 1 | 0 | 2 | 0 | 0 | 0 | 0 | 0 |
| 50(ACL)-70 | MF | (United Arab Emirates) UAE | Bandar Al-Ahbabi | 26 | 3 | 11 | 0 | 10 | 3 | 0 | 0 | 5 | 0 |
Forwards
| 2 | FW | (United Arab Emirates) UAE | Abdulaziz Fayez | 20 | 2 | 14 | 2 | 2 | 0 | 1 | 0 | 3 | 0 |
| 20 | FW | (United Arab Emirates) UAE | Mohamed Abdulrahman | 25 | 3 | 16 | 3 | 5 | 0 | 1 | 0 | 3 | 0 |
| 29 | FW | (Ivory Coast) CIV | Jumaa Saeed | 23 | 6 | 12 | 2 | 10 | 4 | 1 | 0 | 0 | 0 |
| 31 | FW | (United Arab Emirates) UAE | Haddaf Al Ameri | 17 | 3 | 4 | 0 | 7 | 2 | 1 | 0 | 5 | 1 |
| 38 | FW | (Brazil) BRA | Elias Ribeiro | 19 | 10 | 10 | 5 | 2 | 1 | 1 | 0 | 6 | 4 |
| 99-9(ACL) | FW | (United Arab Emirates) UAE | Faisal Ali | 2 | 0 | 1 | 0 | 0 | 0 | 0 | 0 | 1 | 0 |
| 49 | FW | (Romania) ROU | Valentin Badea | 6 | 0 | 1 | 0 | 0 | 0 | 0 | 0 | 5 | 0 |
Players who have made an appearance this season but have left the club
| 9 | FW | (Argentina) ARG | José Sand | 16 | 11 | 10 | 7 | 5 | 4 | 1 | 0 | 0 | 0 |

=== Goalscorers ===
| Rnk | No. | Pos | Player | League | League Cup | President's Cup | Champions League | Total |
|---|---|---|---|---|---|---|---|---|
| 1 | 10 | MF | (United Arab Emirates) Omar Abdulrahman | 8 | | 1 | 2 | 11 |
| — | 9 | FW | (Argentina) José Sand | 7 | 4 | | | 11 |
| 3 | 38 | MF | (Brazil) Elias Ribeiro | 5 | 1 | | 4 | 10 |
| 4 | 29 | FW | (Ivory Coast) Jumaa Saeed | 2 | 4 | | | 6 |
| 5 | 70 | MF | (United Arab Emirates) Bandar Al-Ahbabi | | 3 | | | 3 |
| — | 20 | MF | (United Arab Emirates) Mohamed Abdulrahman | 3 | | | | 3 |
| — | 31 | MF | (United Arab Emirates) Haddaf Al Ameri | | 2 | | 1 | 3 |
| 8 | 2 | FW | (United Arab Emirates) Abdulaziz Fayez | 2 | | | | 2 |
| — | 26 | MF | (United Arab Emirates) Hamad Al Marri | | | 1 | 1 | 2 |
| — | 23 | MF | (United Arab Emirates) Shehab Ahmed | 1 | | 1 | | 2 |
| — | 11 | MF | (United Arab Emirates) Saif Mohammed | | 2 | | | 2 |
| — | 8 | MF | (Ivory Coast) Brahima Keita | | 2 | | | 2 |
| — | — | DF | (United Arab Emirates) Mohanad Salem | 1 | | 1 | | 2 |
| — | 5 | DF | (United Arab Emirates) Ismail Ahmed | 1 | 1 | | | 2 |
| — | 44 | DF | (United Arab Emirates) Fares Jumaa | 2 | | | | 2 |
| 16 | 7 | MF | (United Arab Emirates) Ali Al-Wehaibi | 1 | | | | 1 |
| — | 8 | MF | (United Arab Emirates) Ahmed Al Shamisi | | | 1 | | 1 |
| Own Goals | | | | | | | 1 | |
| TOTALS | | | | 33 | 19 | 5 | 8 | 65 |

Last updated: 5 June 2011
Source: Competitive matches

=== Disciplinary record ===
| N | P | Nat. | Name | League | | | League Cup | | | President's Cup | | | Champions League | | | Total | | | Notes |
| N | P | Nat. | Name | Yellow card | Second yellow card | Red card | Yellow card | Second yellow card | Red card | Yellow card | Second yellow card | Red card | Yellow card | Second yellow card | Red card | Yellow card | Second yellow card | Red card | Notes |
| 3 | DF | (United Arab Emirates) | Mohammed Ayed | 1 | | | | | | | | | 1 | | | 2 | | | |
| 4 | DF | (United Arab Emirates) | Musallem Fayez | 5 | | 1 | 1 | | | | | | | | | 6 | | 1 | |
| 5 | DF | (United Arab Emirates) | Ismail Ahmed | 3 | | | 4 | | | | | | | | | 7 | | | |
| 6 | MF | (Ivory Coast) | Brahima Keita | 4 | 1 | | 3 | | | | | | | | | 7 | 1 | | |
| 7 | MF | (United Arab Emirates) | Ali Al-Wehaibi | 2 | | | | | | | | | | | | 2 | | | |
| 9 | FW | (Argentina) | José Sand | 6 | | | | | | | | | | | | 6 | | | |
| 9 | FW | (Romania) | Valentin Badea | 1 | | | | | | | | | | | | 1 | | | |
| 10 | MF | (United Arab Emirates) | Omar Abdulrahman | | | | | | | | | | 3 | | | 3 | | | |
| 11 | MF | (United Arab Emirates) | Saif Mohammed | 4 | | | 1 | | | | | | | | | 5 | | | |
| 13 | MF | (United Arab Emirates) | Rami Yaslam | 2 | | | 1 | | | | | | | | | 3 | | | |
| 15 | DF | (United Arab Emirates) | Khaled Abdulrahman | | | | 1 | | | | | | 1 | | | 2 | | | |
| 18 | MF | (United Arab Emirates) | Abdullah Malallah | | | | 2 | | | | | | | | | 2 | | | |
| 19 | DF | (United Arab Emirates) | Mohanad Salem | 1 | | | 1 | | | | | | | | | 2 | | | |
| 20 | FW | (United Arab Emirates) | Mohamed Abdulrahman | 3 | | | | | | | | | 1 | | | 4 | | | |
| 21 | DF | (United Arab Emirates) | Fawzi Fayez | 1 | | | 1 | | | | | | | | | 2 | | | |
| 23 | MF | (United Arab Emirates) | Shehab Ahmed | 1 | | | 1 | | | | | | | | | 2 | | | |
| 26 | MF | (United Arab Emirates) | Hamad Al Marri | 2 | | | | | | 1 | | | 1 | | | 4 | | | |
| 29 | MF | (Ivory Coast) | Jumaa Saeed | 3 | | | 1 | | | | | | | | | 4 | | | |
| 30 | GK | (United Arab Emirates) | Abdullah Sultan | 1 | | | | | | | | | | | | 1 | | | |
| 31 | FW | (United Arab Emirates) | Haddaf Al Ameri | 2 | | | | | | | | | 1 | | | 3 | | | |
| 32 | MF | (United Arab Emirates) | Hamad Raqea | | | | 1 | | | | | | | | | 1 | | | |
| 33 | DF | (United Arab Emirates) | Mohammed Al-Dhahri | 3 | | | 1 | | | | | | | | | 4 | | | |
| 38 | FW | (Brazil) | Elias Ribeiro | 2 | | | | | | 1 | | | 1 | | | 4 | | | |
| 39 | GK | (United Arab Emirates) | Ismail Rabee | | | | | | | | | | 1 | | | 1 | | | |
| 44 | DF | (United Arab Emirates) | Fares Jumaa | | | | 1 | | | | | | | | 1 | 1 | | 1 | |
| 70 | MF | (United Arab Emirates) | Bandar Al-Ahbabi | 2 | | | | | | | | | | | | 2 | | | |
| 77 | DF | (United Arab Emirates) | Hazza Salem | 1 | | | 1 | | | | | | 1 | | | 3 | | | |

Last updated: 5 June 2011
Source: Competitive matches and AGLeague.ae
Only competitive matches
Ordered by (red card) , (second yellow card) and (yellow card)
(yellow card) = Number of bookings; (second yellow card) = Number of sending offs after a second yellow card; (red card) = Number of sending offs by a direct red card.

=== Assists ===
| Rnk | No. | Pos | Player | League | League Cup | President's Cup | Champions League | Total |
|---|---|---|---|---|---|---|---|---|
| — | 8 | MF | (United Arab Emirates) Ahmed Al Shamisi | | | 1 | | 1 |
| — | 9 | FW | (Romania) Valentin Badea | | | | 1 | 1 |
| — | 10 | MF | (United Arab Emirates) Omar Abdulrahman | | | | 1 | 1 |
| — | 11 | MF | (United Arab Emirates) Saif Mohammed | | 1 | | | 1 |
| — | 13 | MF | (United Arab Emirates) Rami Yaslam | | | | 1 | 1 |
| — | 23 | MF | (United Arab Emirates) Shehab Ahmed | | 1 | | | 1 |
| — | 26 | MF | (United Arab Emirates) Hamad Al Marri | | | 1 | | 1 |
| — | 28 | MF | (United Arab Emirates) Faraj Jumaa | | 1 | | | 1 |
| — | 29 | FW | (Ivory Coast) Jumaa Saeed | | 2 | | | 1 |
| — | 31 | FW | (United Arab Emirates) Haddaf Al Ameri | | | | 1 | 1 |
| — | 33 | DF | (United Arab Emirates) Mohammed Al-Dhahri | | 1 | | | 1 |
| — | 36 | GK | (United Arab Emirates) Dawoud Sulaiman | | 1 | | | 1 |
| — | 38 | FW | (Brazil) Elias Ribeiro | | 1 | | | 1 |
| — | 70 | MF | (United Arab Emirates) Bandar Al-Ahbabi | | 2 | | 1 | 1 |
| — | 77 | DF | (United Arab Emirates) Hazza Salem | | | 1 | | 1 |
| TOTALS | | | | | | | | |

Last updated: 5 June 2011
Source: Competitive matches

=== Clean sheets ===
| Rank | Player | Clean sheets |
|---|---|---|
| 1 | (United Arab Emirates) Dawoud Sulaiman | 5 |
| 2 | (United Arab Emirates) Abdullah Sultan | 4 |
| 3 | (United Arab Emirates) Waleed Salem | 3 |
| 4 | (United Arab Emirates) Ismail Rabee | 2 |
| TOTALS | | 14 |

Last updated: 5 June 2011
Source: Competitive matches
