= List of Al Ain FC records and statistics =

Al Ain FC is a professional football club, based in Al Ain, Abu Dhabi, United Arab Emirates. It is one of many sport sections of the multi-sports club Al Ain Sports and Cultural Club (Arabic: نادي العين الرياضي الثقافي) Al Ain SCC for short. Founded in 1968 by players from Al Ain, members of a Bahraini group of exchange students and the Sudanese community working in the United Arab Emirates.

Al Ain made a successful debut by beating a team made up of British soldiers and went on to play friendly matches against other Abu Dhabi clubs. In 1971, the team played their first match against international opposition when they were defeated 7–0 by the Egyptian club Ismaily in a friendly match for the war effort. Has amassed various records since its founding, quickly gained popularity and recognition throughout the country, being the team with the most trophies 36 in total.

== Honours ==
38 official Championships.

Type		Competition	Seasons			
Type		Competition	Titles		Runners-up	
Domestic	National	Pro League	1976–77, 1980–81, 1983–84, 1992–93, 1997–98, 1999–00, 2001–02, 2002–03, 2003–04, 2011–12, 2012–13, 2014–15, 2017–18, 2021–22	14	1975–76, 1977–78, 1981–82, 1993–94, 1994–95, 1998–99, 2004–05, 2015–16	9
Domestic	National	President's Cup	1998–99, 2000–01, 2004–05, 2005–06, 2008–09, 2013–14, 2017–18	7	1978–79, 1980–81, 1989–90, 1993–94, 1994–95, 2006–07, 2015–16, 2022–23	8^{S}
Domestic	National	Super Cup	1995, 2003, 2009, 2012, 2015	5^{S}	1993, 2002, 2013, 2014, 2018, 2022	6
Domestic	National	League Cup	2008–09, 2021–22	2	2010–11, 2022–23	2
Domestic	National	Federation Cup	1988–89, 2004–05, 2005–06	3	1986, 1994	2
Domestic	National	Joint League	1982–83	1^{S}		
Domestic	State	Abu Dhabi Championship	1973–74, 1974–75	2^{S}		
Regional		GCC Champions League	2001	1		
Regional		Emirati-Moroccan Super Cup	2015	1		
Continental		AFC Champions League	2003, 2024	2	2005, 2016	2
Worldwide		FIFA Club World Cup			2018	1

- record
- ^{S} shared record

=== Doubles and trebles (9–1) ===
- Doubles

- League and President's Cup doubles (1) (shared record):

2017–18

- League and League Cup (1) (shared record):

2021–22

- League and Super Cup (2) (shared record):

2002–03, 2012–13

- President's Cup and League Cup (1) (shared record):

2008–09

- President's Cup and Federation Cup (2) (record):

2004–05, 2005–06

- President's Cup and GCC Club Championship (1) (record):

2000–01

- Super Cup and Emirati-Moroccan Super Cup (1) (record):

2015–16

- Treble

- League, Super Cup and Champions League (1) (record):

2002–03

=== Three-peats ===
- UAE Pro League (1) (record):

2001–02, 2002–03, 2003–04

== Players records ==
=== Most appearances ===
==== All competitions ====
As of match played 25 May 2024

The below list is since the Pro League era starting in 2008–09.

Rank	Player	Nationality	Years	League	LC/SC/PC (Note: Includes the UAE League Cup, UAE Super Cup, UAE President Cup)	Asia/ACCC/FCWC/EMSC (Note: Includes the AFC Champions League, Arab Club Champions Cup, FIFA Club World Cup, Emirati-Moroccan Super Cup)	Total	Ref.
1	**Khalid Eisa**	United Arab Emirates	2013–	247	**22** / **5** / **29**	**79** / **2** / **4** / **1**	389	
2	Mohanad Salem	United Arab Emirates	2008–2021	213	**25** / **6** / **24**	**61** / **0** / **1** / **1**	331	
2	Mohammed Abdulrahman	United Arab Emirates	2008–2021	203	**32** / **4** / **20**	**66** / **2** / **3** / **1**	331	
4	Ismail Ahmed	United Arab Emirates	2008–2021	192	**34** / **3** / **22**	**70** / **2** / **4** / **1**	328	
5	**Bandar Al-Ahbabi**	United Arab Emirates	2010–	152	**24** / **1** / **13**	**45** / **2** / **4** / **0**	241	
6	Omar Abdulrahman	United Arab Emirates	2008–2018	141	**8** / **4** / **16**	**61** / **0** / **0** / **1**	231	
7	Mohamed Ahmed	United Arab Emirates	2012–2023	125	**11** / **4** / **19**	**48** / **1** / **4** / **0**	212	

=== Top goalscorers ===
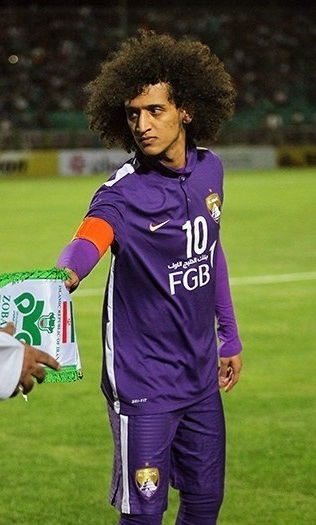

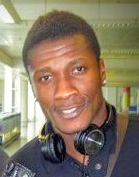
Omar Abdulrahman, Asamoah Gyan Al Ain's top goalscorer in AFC Champions League with 18 goals

==== All competitions ====
As of 3 September 2024.
Bold indicates player is still active at club level.

Rank	Player	Nationality	Years	Goals
1	Ahmed Abdullah	(United Arab Emirates)	1978–1995	185
2	Asamoah Gyan	(Ghana)	2011–2015	128
3	**Kodjo Laba**	(Togo)	2019–present	128
4	Mohieddine Habita	(Tunisia)	1976–1983	71
5	Majid Al Owais	(United Arab Emirates)	1992	70
6	Omar Abdulrahman	(United Arab Emirates)	2008–2018	62
7	Matar Al Sahbani	(United Arab Emirates)	1983	60
7	Salem Johar	(United Arab Emirates)	1992–2005	60
9	Saif Sultan	(United Arab Emirates)	1992–2005	55
10	Marcus Berg	(Sweden)	2017–2019	51

Note: this includes goals scored in all competitions.

==== International competitions ====
Rank	Player	Nationality	Goals
1	Omar Abdulrahman	(United Arab Emirates)	19
2	Asamoah Gyan	(Ghana)	18
3	Soufiane Rahimi	(Morocco)	13
4	Marcus Berg	(Sweden)	11
5	Kodjo Fo-Doh Laba	(Togo)	10
6	Ibrahim Diaky	(United Arab Emirates)	9
6	Subait Khater	(United Arab Emirates)	9
6	Gharib Harib	(United Arab Emirates)	9
9	Caio Lucas	(Brazil)	7
9	Helal Saeed	(United Arab Emirates)	7
9	Boubacar Sanogo	(Ivory Coast)	7
12	Nenad Jestrović	(Serbia)	6

==== UAE Pro League ====
Statistics correct as of match played on 25 August 2024

Rank	Player	Goals
1	(United Arab Emirates) Ahmed Abdullah	117
**2**	(Togo) **Kodjo Laba**	**101**
3	(Ghana) Asamoah Gyan	95
4	(United Arab Emirates) Majid Al Owais	86
5	(Tunisia) Mohieddine Habita	57
6	(United Arab Emirates) Salem Johar	53
7	(United Arab Emirates) Saif Sultan	45
8	(United Arab Emirates) Omar Abdulrahman	39
9	(United Arab Emirates) Subait Khater	38
10	(United Arab Emirates) Matar Al Sahbani	37
11	(Sweden) Marcus Berg	35
12	(Ivory Coast) Boubacar Sanogo	35
13	(Argentina) José Sand	31

==== AFC Champions League ====
Since 2002–03 AFC Champions League, includes goals scored in qualifying play-off
Statistics correct as of match played against Yokohama F. Marinos on 25 May 2024

P	Player	TOTAL
1	(Ghana) Asamoah Gyan	18
2	(United Arab Emirates) Omar Abdulrahman	18
3	(Morocco) **Soufiane Rahimi**	13
4	(Togo) **Kodjo Laba**	10
5	(Sweden) Marcus Berg	9
4	(Ivory Coast) Boubacar Sanogo	7
4	(United Arab Emirates) Ibrahim Diaky	7
6	(Serbia) Nenad Jestrović	6
6	(Brazil) Caio	6
8	(United Arab Emirates) Mohamed Abdulrahman	5
8	(Brazil) Douglas	5
8	(Colombia) Danilo Asprilla	5
8	(United Arab Emirates) Subait Khater	5
12	(Paraguay) **Kaku**	4
12	(Brazil) Edílson	4
12	(Brazil) Elias Ribeiro	4
12	(Argentina) José Sand	4
12	(France) Kembo Ekoko	4
12	(United Arab Emirates) Ismail Ahmed	4
12	(South Korea) Lee Myung-joo	4
18	(United Arab Emirates) Mohammad Omar	3
18	(Saudi Arabia) Nasser Al-Shamrani	3
18	(Nigeria) Onyekachi Nwoha	3
18	(United Arab Emirates) Shehab Ahmed	3
18	(United Arab Emirates) Gharib Harib	3
18	(Australia) Alex Brosque	3
24	(United Arab Emirates) **Erik Jorgens**	2
24	(United Arab Emirates) **Kouame Autonne**	2
24	(United Arab Emirates) Rami Yaslam	2
24	(Panama) Luis Tejada	2
24	(United Arab Emirates) Ahmed Khalil	2
24	(Japan) Tsukasa Shiotani	2
24	(United Arab Emirates) Helal Saeed	2
24	(United Arab Emirates) Faisal Ali	2
24	(Brazil) Kelly	2
32	(United Arab Emirates) **Mohammed Abbas**	1
32	(United Arab Emirates) **Sultan Al-Shamsi**	1
32	(Israel) Omer Atzili	1
32	(United Arab Emirates) **Eisa Khalfan**	1
32	(United Arab Emirates) **Khalid Al-Balochi**	1
32	(Ivory Coast) Kandia Traoré	1
32	(Brazil) Rodrigo Mendes	1
32	(Iran) Farhad Majidi	1
32	(United Arab Emirates) Salem Johar	1
32	(Oman) Ahmed Kano	1
32	(United Arab Emirates) Nasser Khamis	1
32	(United Arab Emirates) Ali Msarri	1
32	(Brazil) Dodô	1
32	(United Arab Emirates) Ali Al-Wehaibi	1
32	(United Arab Emirates) Musallem Fayez	1
32	(Cameroon) Franck Ongfiang	1
32	(Iraq) Hawar Mulla	1
32	(Brazil) Emerson Sheik	1
32	(Chile) Jorge Valdivia	1
32	(United Arab Emirates) Haddaf Abdullah	1
32	(United Arab Emirates) Hamad Al Marri	1
32	(United Arab Emirates) Yousef Ahmed	1
32	(Slovakia) Miroslav Stoch	1
32	(United Arab Emirates) Rashed Eisa	1
32	(United Arab Emirates) Saeed Al-Kathiri	1
32	(Egypt) Hussein El Shahat	1
32	(United Arab Emirates) Jamal Maroof	1
32	(United Arab Emirates) Saeed Juma	1
32	(Egypt) Omar Yaisien	1
32	(Kazakhstan) Bauyrzhan Islamkhan	1
Total		208

==== FIFA Club World Cup ====
Statistics correct as of match played against Real Madrid on 22 December 2018

P	Player	TOTAL
1	(Sweden) Marcus Berg	2
1	(Japan) Tsukasa Shiotani	2
3	(United Arab Emirates) Mohamed Ahmed	1
3	(United Arab Emirates) Bandar Al-Ahbabi	1
3	(Brazil) Caio	1
3	(Mali) Tongo Doumbia	1
3	(Egypt) Hussein El Shahat	1
Total		9

==== Asian Cup Winners' Cup ====
P	Player	TOTAL
1	(Ghana) Arthur Moses	4
2	(United Arab Emirates) Gharib Harib	2
3	(United Arab Emirates) Helal Saeed	1
Total		7

==== Arab Club Champions Cup ====
P	Player	TOTAL
1	(United Arab Emirates) Ibrahim Diaky	2
Total		2

==== GCC Champions League ====
P	Player	TOTAL
1	(United Arab Emirates) Ahmed Abdullah	2
1	(United Arab Emirates) Subait Khater	2
1	(United Arab Emirates) Gharib Harib	2
4	(United Arab Emirates) Abdulhameed Al Mistaki	1
4	(United Arab Emirates) Salem Johar	1
4	(United Arab Emirates) Fahad Ali	1
4	(United Arab Emirates) Mohamed Mubarak	1
4	(United Arab Emirates) Abubakar Omar	1
4	(United Arab Emirates) Awad Gharib	1
4	(United Arab Emirates) Jasem Tawfiq	1
Total		13

==== Emirati-Moroccan Super Cup ====
P	Player	TOTAL
1	(South Korea) Lee Myung-joo	1
1	(United Arab Emirates) Omar Abdulrahman	1
Total		2

==== Asian Club Championship ====
P	Player	TOTAL
1	(United Arab Emirates) Helal Saeed	4
1	(Ghana) Abedi Pele	4
2	(United Arab Emirates) Fahad Al Nowais	3
3	(United Arab Emirates) Subait Khater	2
3	(Argentina) Emiliano Rey	2
3	(United Arab Emirates) Gharib Harib	2
3	(Burkina Faso) Seydou Traoré	2
3	(United Arab Emirates) Abdullah Shila	2
3	(United Arab Emirates) Majid Al Owais	2
3	(Morocco) Rachid Daoudi	2
4	(Brazil) Sandro Oliviera	1
4	(United Arab Emirates) Faisal Ali	1
4	(Argentina) Sergio Berti	1
4	(United Arab Emirates) Jasem Tawfiq	1
Total		29

== Players' individual honours and awards while playing with Al Ain ==
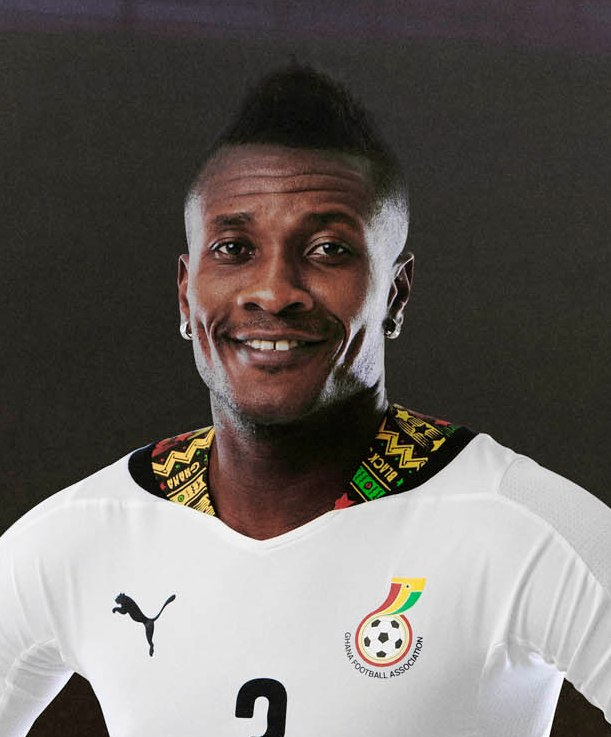
Asamoah Gyan won the top scorer of the UAE Pro League and Arabian Golden Boot for three consecutive season. Becoming the first player ever to achieve that.

- Al Ain players that have been the top scorer of UAE Pro League:
  - (Tunisia) Mohieddine Habita (1977–78, 20 goals)
  - (United Arab Emirates) Ahmed Abdullah (1981–82, 13 goals); (1983–84, 20 goals)
  - (United Arab Emirates) Saif Sultan (1992–93, 21 goals)
  - (Argentina) José Sand (2009–10, 24 goals)
  - (Ghana) Asamoah Gyan (2011–12, 21); (2012–13, 31); (2013–14, 29)
  - (Sweden) Marcus Berg (2017–18, 25 goals)
  - (Togo) Kodjo Fo-Doh Laba (2019–20, 19 goals); (2021–22, 26)
- Al Ain players that have been the top scorer of UAE President's Cup:
  - (United Arab Emirates) Ahmed Abdullah (1978–79, 5 goals)
  - (United Arab Emirates) Ali Al-Wehaibi (2005–06, 3 goals)
  - (Serbia) Nenad Jestrović (2006–07, 4 goals)
  - (Brazil) André Dias (2008–09, 9 goals)
  - (Ghana) Asamoah Gyan (2013–14, 6 goals); (2014–15, 4 goals)
  - (Brazil) Dyanfres Douglas (2015–16, 5 goals)
- Al Ain players that have been the top scorer of UAE Super Cup:
- Al Ain players that have won the GCC Golden Boot:
  - (United Arab Emirates) Ahmed Abdullah (1982–83, 20 goals in 18 games)
  - (United Arab Emirates) Saif Sultan (1992–93, 21 goals in 22 games)
  - (Argentina) José Sand (2009–10, 24 goals in 22 games)
  - (Ghana) Asamoah Gyan (2011–12, 22 goals in 22 games); (2012–13, 31 goals in 26 games); (2013–14, 29 goals in 26 games)
- Al Ain players that have won the Asian Footballer of the Year:
  - (United Arab Emirates) Omar Abdulrahman (1): 2016
- Al Ain players that have won the Best player award at AFC Champions League:
  - (Burkina Faso) Seydou Traoré (1): 1999
  - (United Arab Emirates) Omar Abdulrahman (1): 2016
  - (Morocco) Soufiane Rahimi (1): 2024
- Al Ain players that have been the top scorer of AFC Champions League:
  - (Ghana) Asamoah Gyan (2014, 12 goals in 12 games)
  - (Morocco) Soufiane Rahimi (1): (2024, 13 goals in 13 games)
- Al Ain players that were included in the AFC Champions League Team of the Season:
  - (United Arab Emirates) Omar Abdulrahman (3), (South Korea) Lee Myung-joo (2), (Ghana) Asamoah Gyan (1), (United Arab Emirates) Ismail Ahmed (1), (Brazil) Caio Lucas (1), (Colombia) Danilo Asprilla (1)
- Al Ain players that have won Player of the week awards at AFC Champions League:
  - (United Arab Emirates) Omar Abdulrahman (1), (United Arab Emirates) Khalid Eisa (1)
- Al Ain players that have won man of the match at FIFA Club World Cup:
  - (United Arab Emirates) Khalid Eisa (2), (Egypt) Hussein El Shahat (1)
- Al Ain players that have won Adidas Silver Ball at FIFA Club World Cup:
  - (Brazil) Caio Lucas (1): (2018)

== See also ==
- List of Al Ain FC seasons
- Al Ain FC in international football
