= 2011 Etisalat Emirates Cup final =

- Event: 2010–11 Etisalat Emirates Cup
Al Ain	Al Shabab
2	3
- Date: 29 April 2011
- Venue: Mohammad bin Zayed Stadium, Abu Dhabi
- Referee: Ali Hamad
- Attendance: 8,027

The 2011 Etisalat Emirates Cup final was the third final since its establishment. The match took place at the Mohammad bin Zayed Stadium, Abu Dhabi, on 29 April 2011. The match was won by Al Shabab, who beat Al Ain 2–3 to win their first title. and it was refereed by Ali Hamad.

== Road to the final ==
Al Ain
Round
Al Shabab
Opponent
Result
Legs
Qualifying phase
Opponent
Result
Legs
Main article: 2010–11 Etisalat Emirates Cup group stage: Group A

Team	Pld	W	D	L	GF	GA	GD	Pts
Al Ain	10	5	4	1	15	8	+7	19
Al Wahda	10	5	2	3	12	9	+3	17
Al Dhafra	10	4	3	3	15	15	0	15
Al Nasr	10	3	3	4	11	13	−2	12
Dubai	10	2	4	4	21	21	0	10
Bani Yas	10	2	2	6	10	19	−9	8

Source: UAEProLeague.com
Group stage

Team	Pld	W	D	L	GF	GA	GD	Pts
Al Shabab	10	5	3	2	13	9	+4	18
Al Wasl	10	4	4	2	11	9	+2	16
Al Sharjah	10	3	5	2	11	13	−2	14
Ittihad Kalba	10	2	6	2	10	10	0	12
Al Jazira	10	2	4	4	14	14	0	10
Al Ahli	10	1	4	5	11	17	−6	7

Source: UAEProLeague.com
Main article: 2010–11 Etisalat Emirates Cup group stage: Group B
Opponent
Result
Legs
Knockout stage
Opponent
Result
Legs
Al Wasl
3 - 2

Semi-finals
Al Wahda
3 - 1

== Pre-match ==
=== Venue ===
On 3 April, UAE Football League Announced that the final will be held for the second time at Mohammed Bin Zayed Stadium in Abu Dhabi, on April 29. The first was on 3 April 2009, won by Al Ain defeating rival Al Wahda 1–0.

=== Ticketing ===
The Tickets were sold on the same day of the match, price from AED20.

== Match ==
=== Match details ===
29 April 2011
19:35 (GMT+4)

Al Ain	2–3	Al Shabab
Al Wehaibi 18'; Juma. S 90+1'	(Report)	87' Júlio César; 70', 9+3' Ciel

Mohammad bin Zayed Stadium, Abu Dhabi
Attendance: 8,027
Referee: Ali Hamad

Al Ain
Al Shabab

GK	12	(United Arab Emirates) Waleed Salem (c)
DF	4	(United Arab Emirates) Musallem Fayez
DF	5	(United Arab Emirates) Ismail Ahmed
DF	33	(United Arab Emirates) Mohammed Salem	(yellow card) 61'
DF	44	(United Arab Emirates) Faris Jumaa
MF	6	(Ivory Coast) Ibrahima Keita
MF	7	(United Arab Emirates) Ali Al Wehaibi
MF	10	(United Arab Emirates) Omar Abdulrahman
MF	13	(United Arab Emirates) Rami Yaslam
MF	23	(United Arab Emirates) Shehab Ahmed	(substituted off) 71'
FW	38	(Brazil) Elias Ribeiro (substituted off) 83'
Substitutions:
FW	2	(United Arab Emirates) Abdulaziz Fayez		(substituted off) 71'
FW	29	(Ivory Coast) Juma Saeed		(substituted off) 83'
Manager:
(Brazil) Alexandre Gallo

GK	1	(United Arab Emirates) Hassan Al Sharif (c)
DF	3	(United Arab Emirates) Abdulla Darwish	(substituted off) 83'
DF	5	(United Arab Emirates) Walid Abbas	(yellow card) 88'
DF	19	(United Arab Emirates) Mohamed Ahmad
DF	29	(United Arab Emirates) Esam Dhahi
MF	7	(United Arab Emirates) Ali Mohamed	(substituted off) 46'
MF	10	(Chile) Carlos Villanueva	(yellow card) 52'
MF	21	(United Arab Emirates) Adel Abdullah
MF	27	(Brazil) Júlio César	(yellow card) 87'
MF	99	(Brazil) Ciel
FW	24	(United Arab Emirates) Essa Obaid	(yellow card) 71'	(substituted off) 80'
Substitutions:
MF	2	(United Arab Emirates) Essa Mohammed		(substituted in) 83'
MF	6	(United Arab Emirates) Hassan Ibrahim		(substituted in) 46'
FW	15	(United Arab Emirates) Dawood Ali		(substituted in) 80'
Manager:
(Brazil) Paulo Bonamigo

Assistant referees:
Saeed Al Houti
Zayed Dawood Kamal
Fourth official:
Adel Al Naqbi

Etisalat Emirates Cup
2010–11 winners
Al Shabab
1st title

== See also ==
- 2011 UAE President's Cup Final
- 2011 UAE Super Cup
