= 2008–09 Al Ain FC season =

Al Ain
2008–09 season
- President: Mohammed Bin Zayed
- Manager: Winfried Schäfer (from 26 Dec 2007)
- Stadium: Khalifa bin Zayed
- UAE Pro League: 3rd
- President's Cup: Winners
- League Cup: Winners
- Top goalscorer: League: Jorge Valdivia (23); All: André Dias (23)
Home colours	Away colours
- All statistics correct as of 24 May 2009.

The 2008–09 season was Al Ain Football Club's 41st season in existence and the club's 34th consecutive season in the top-level football league in the UAE.

== Competitions ==
=== Overview ===
Competition	First match	Last match	Starting round	Final position	Record							
Competition	First match	Last match	Starting round	Final position	Pld	W	D	L	GF	GA	GD	Win %
Pro League	19 September 2008	24 May 2009	Matchday 1	3rd	22	12	7	3	40	20	+20	54.55
President's Cup	31 October 2008	13 April 2009	Round of 32	Winners	5	5	0	0	19	4	+15	100.00
League Cup	11 October 2008	3 April 2009	Group stage	Winners	9	7	1	1	15	5	+10	77.78
Total					36	24	8	4	74	29	+45	66.67

Last updated: 24 May 2009
Source: Competitions

=== UAE Pro League ===
==== League table ====
Pos	Team	Pld	W	D	L	GF	GA	GD	Pts	Qualification or relegation
1	Al-Ahli (C)	22	17	4	1	54	25	+29	55	2009 Club World Cup and 2010 AFC Champions League Group Stage
2	Al Jazira	22	17	3	2	57	17	+40	54	2010 AFC Champions League Group Stage
3	Al Ain	22	12	7	3	40	20	+20	43	2010 AFC Champions League Group Stage
4	Al-Wahda	22	10	4	8	40	39	+1	34	2010 AFC Champions League Qualifying play-off (Note: Since Al-Ain also won the 2008–09 UAE President's Cup, the fourth-placed team of the league also qualified for the 2010 AFC Champions League.)
5	Al Shabab	22	8	4	10	33	37	−4	28	2009–10 Gulf Club Champions Cup

Rules for classification: 1) points; 2) goal difference; 3) number of goals scored.
(C) Champions

==== Matches ====
19 September 2008 1	Al Ain	4–0	Sharjah	Al Ain
22:00	Dias 2'; Valdivia 45'; Alloudi 55'; Salem .A 85'	Report		Stadium: Khalifa bin Zayed; Referee: Mohamed Al Junaibi

25 September 2008 2	Al Dhafra	0–0	Al Ain	Abu Dhabi
22:00		Report		Stadium: Hamdan Bin Zayed; Referee: Mohamed Omar

4 October 2008 3	Khor Fakkan	0–2	Al Ain	Khor Fakkan
17:15		Report	Alloudi 48'; Senghor 57'	Stadium: Saqr bin Mohammad Al Qassimi; Referee: Ali Al Mulla

24 October 2008 4	Al Ain	2–0	Al Shabab	Al Ain
20:00	Valdivia 14', 28'	Report		Stadium: Khalifa bin Zayed; Referee: Fareed Al-Marzouqi

6 November 2008 5	Al Nasr	2–2	Al Ain	Dubai
20:00	Mosalam .A 23'; Madanchi 43'	Report	Valdivia 17'; Senghor 55'	Stadium: Al Maktoum Stadium; Referee: Ali Al-Badwawi

11 November 2008 6	Al Ain	2–0	Ajman	Al Ain
20:15	Valdivia 30', 45'	Report		Stadium: Khalifa bin Zayed; Referee: Abdulla Al Ajel

24 November 2008 7	Al Wahda	0–1	Al Ain	Abu Dhabi
20:15			Senghor 50'	Stadium: Al Nahyan Stadium; Referee: Fareed Al-Marzouqi

6 December 2008 8	Al Ain	0–2	Al Jazira	Al Ain
20:15		Report	Saleh .A 34'; Baiano 57'	Stadium: Khalifa bin Zayed; Referee: Mohamed Omar

13 December 2008 9	Al Ahli	2–2	Al Ain	Dubai
20:15	Abd Rabo 22', 33'	Report	Valdivia 60'; Senghor 89'	Stadium: Rashid Stadium; Referee: Ali Al-Badwawi

18 December 2008 10	Al Ain	2–0	Al Wasl	Al Ain
18:00	Dias 82', 89'	Report		Stadium: Khalifa bin Zayed; Referee: Fareed Al-Marzouqi

6 February 2009 11	Al Shaab	1–2	Al Ain	Sharjah
17:25	Attram 39'	Report	Dias 8'; Senghor 48'	Stadium: Khalid bin Mohammed; Referee: Mohamed Al-Zarouni

15 February 2009 12	Sharjah	1–2	Al Ain	Sharjah
17:30	Barbosa 17'	Report	Al-Wehaibi 46'; Senghor 93'	Stadium: Sharjah Stadium; Referee: Abdulla Al Ajel

20 February 2009 13	Al Ain	2–2	Al Dhafra	Al Ain
17:30	Saif .M 27'; F. Ali 37'	Report	Kader 79'; Suhail 82'	Stadium: Khalifa bin Zayed; Referee: Abdelwahid Khatir

28 February 2009 14	Al Ain	2–1	Khor Fakkan	Al Ain
17:35	Senghor 60'; Hazza .S 76'	Report	Malallah 78'	Stadium: Khalifa bin Zayed; Referee: Fareed Al-Marzouqi

6 March 2009 15	Al Shabab	0–0	Al Ain	Dubai
17:45		Report		Stadium: Maktoum bin Rashid Al Maktoum; Referee: Mohamed Omar

14 March 2009 16	Al Ain	1–2	Al Nasr	Al Ain
20:15	F. Ali 95'	Report	Madanchi 51', 60'	Stadium: Khalifa bin Zayed; Referee: Mohamed Al-Zarouni

17 April 2009 17	Ajman	0–5	Al Ain	Ajman
18:00		Report	Dias 11', 69'; Al-Wehaibi 46'; Saif .M 73'; Valdivia 90'	Stadium: Rashid Bin Saeed; Referee: Mohammed Abdulla

25 April 2009 18	Al Ain	4–2	Al Wahda	Al Ain
20:00	Dias 49', 54'; Al-Wehaibi 62'; Senghor 87'	Report	Coly 59', 75'	Stadium: Khalifa bin Zayed; Referee: Ali Al-Badwawi

2 May 2009 19	Al Jazira	2–0	Al Ain	Abu Dhabi
20:30	Baiano 53'; Mabkhout 89'	Report		Stadium: Mohammed bin Zayed; Referee: Fareed Al-Marzouqi

11 May 2009 20	Al Ain	2–2	Al Ahli	Al Ain
19:35	Valdivia 56'; Omar .A 78'	Report	Baré 26', 80'	Stadium: Khalifa bin Zayed; Referee: Mohamed Omar

16 May 2009 21	Al Wasl	1–1	Al Ain	Dubai
19:35	Mobali 86'	Report	Omar .A 55'	Stadium: Zabeel Stadium; Referee: Mohammed Abdulla

24 May 2009 22	Al Ain	2–0	Al Ahli	Al Ain
19:40	Omar .A 85'; Saif .M 89'	Report		Stadium: Khalifa bin Zayed; Referee: Mohamed Al-Zarouni

=== UAE President's Cup ===
31 October 2008 Round of 32	Al Ain	8–0	Dibba	Dubai
16:50	Abdulla .A 4' (o.g.); Dias 27', 66', 72'; Valdivia 32', 84'; Saif .M 50'; Salem .A 85'	Report		Stadium: Al Aweer Stadium; Referee: Hamad Ali Yousef

29 November 2008 Round of 16	Al Ain	4–0	Fujairah	Dubai
16:40	Dias 49', 61', 68'; F. Ali 86'	Report		Stadium: Zabeel Stadium; Referee: Bader Abdullah

2 February 2009 Quarter-finals	Al Ain	3–2	Baniyas	Dubai
20:15	Valdivia 71'; I. Ahmed 77'; F. Ali 119'	Report	Georges 33'; Diarra 82'	Stadium: Al Maktoum Stadium; Referee: Ali Al Mulla

24 February 2009 Semi-finals	Al Dhafra	1–3	Al Ain	Abu Dhabi
17:30	Al Saadi 22'	Report	Dias 55', 75'; Senghor 82'	Stadium: Zayed Sports City; Referee: Mohamed Al Junaibi

13 April 2009 Final	Al Ain	1–0	Al Shabab	Abu Dhabi
17:55	Dias 64' (pen.)	Report		Stadium: Mohammed bin Zayed; Referee: Mohamed Al-Zarouni

=== UAE League Cup ===
==== Group stage ====
===== Group C =====
Team	Pld	W	D	L	GF	GA	GD	Pts
Al Ain	6	4	1	1	9	4	+5	13
Al-Ahli	6	3	1	2	13	10	+3	10
Al-Nasr	6	2	0	4	6	6	0	6
Ajman	6	2	0	4	5	13	−8	6

Source: goalzz.com

11 October 2008 1	Al Ain	1–0	Ajman	Al Ain
17:20	Al-Wehaibi 14'	Report		Stadium: Khalifa bin Zayed; Referee: Hamad Al Shaikh

18 October 2008 2	Al Ahli	1–1	Al Ain	Dubai
20:00	Abd Rabo 57'	Report	Senghor 8'	Stadium: Rashid Stadium; Referee: Mohamed Omar

7 January 2009 3	Al Nasr	0–1	Al Ain	Dubai
17:05		Report	Valdivia 41'	Stadium: Zabeel Stadium; Referee: Mohammed Abdulla

13 January 2009 4	Al Ain	2–1	Al Nasr	Al Ain
20:00	Valdivia 18' (pen.); Dias 76'	Report	Nosrati 49'	Stadium: Khalifa bin Zayed; Referee: Khaled Al-Doukhi

18 January 2009 5	Ajman	0–3	Al Ain	Ajman
17:10		Report	R. Yaslam 34'; Salem .A 41'; Dias 52'	Stadium: Rashid Bin Saeed; Referee: Hamad Al Shaikh

24 January 2009 6	Al Ain	1–2	Al Ahli	Al Ain
17:15	Senghor 34'	Report	F. Khalil 52'; Baré 65'	Stadium: Khalifa bin Zayed; Referee: Abdullah Karam

==== Semi-finals ====
22 March 2009 First leg	Al Jazira	1–4	Al Ain	Abu Dhabi
17:55	Baiano 48'	Report	Dias 10', 30', 45' (pen.); Hilal .M 46'	Stadium: Mohammed bin Zayed; Referee: Mohammed Abdulla

27 March 2009 Second leg	Al Ain	1–0 (5–1 agg.)	Al Jazira	Al Ain
20:30	Dias 70'	Report		Stadium: Khalifa bin Zayed; Referee: Mohamed Al Junaibi

==== Final ====
3 April 2009	Al Ain	1–0	Al Wahda	Abu Dhabi
19:30	Shehab .A 74'	Report; Details		Stadium: Mohammed bin Zayed; Referee: Mohammed Abdulla

== Statistics ==
=== Goalscorers ===
As of 24 May 2009

Includes all competitive matches. The list is sorted alphabetically by surname when total goals are equal.

Rank	Pos.	Player	Pro League	President's Cup	League Cup	Total
1	FW	(Brazil) André Dias	8	9	6	23
2	MF	(Chile) Jorge Valdivia	9	3	2	14
3	FW	(Senegal) André Senghor	8	1	2	11
4	MF	(United Arab Emirates) Saif Mohammed	3	1	0	4
4	MF	(United Arab Emirates) Ali Al-Wehaibi	3	0	1	4
4	FW	(United Arab Emirates) Faisal Ali	2	2	0	4
7	MF	(United Arab Emirates) Omar Abdulrahman	3	0	0	3
7	MF	(United Arab Emirates) Salem Abdullah	1	1	1	3
9	FW	(Morocco) Soufiane Alloudi	2	0	0	2
10	DF	(United Arab Emirates) Hazza Salem	1	0	0	1
10	DF	(United Arab Emirates) Ismail Ahmed	0	1	0	1
10	MF	(United Arab Emirates) Rami Yaslam	0	0	1	1
10	DF	(United Arab Emirates) Hilal Al Mesmari	0	0	1	1
10	MF	(United Arab Emirates) Shehab Ahmed	0	0	1	1
Own goals (from the opponents)			0	1	0	1
Totals			40	19	15	74
