= 2001 UAE President's Cup final =

- Event: 2000–01 UAE President's Cup
Al Ain	Al Shaab
3	2
- Date: 7 June 2001
- Venue: Zayed Sports City, Abu Dhabi
- Referee: Mohamed Omar

The 2001 UAE President's Cup final was the 25th final of the Emirati competition, the UAE President's Cup. The final was played at Zayed Sports City, in Abu Dhabi, on 7 June 2001. Al Ain beat Al Shaab 3–2 to win their second title.

== Match details ==
7 June 2001
20:10 GMT+4 (UAE Time)

Al Ain	3–2	Al Shaab
S. Yousif 71' (o.g.); Tiéhi 85'; Mossi 90'	Report	Brusselers 44', 79'

Zayed Sports City, Abu Dhabi
Attendance: 25,000
Referee: Mohamed Omar

GK	12	(United Arab Emirates) Waleed Salem (substituted off)
DF	19	(United Arab Emirates) Fahad Ali
DF	15	(United Arab Emirates) Juma Khater
DF	16	(United Arab Emirates) Abdullah Ali (substituted off)
DF	4	(United Arab Emirates) Salem Ali (yellow card) 43' (substituted in)
MF	11	(United Arab Emirates) Salem Joher (VC)
MF	21	(United Arab Emirates) Gharib Harib (yellow card)
MF	5	(United Arab Emirates) Sultan Rashed
MF	24	(United Arab Emirates) Subait Khater
FW	7	(Ivory Coast) Joël Tiéhi
FW	13	(Burundi) Juma Mossi
Substitutes:
GK	1	(United Arab Emirates) Mutaz Abdulla	Substituted in
MF	20	(United Arab Emirates) Helal Saeed	Substituted in
MF	18	(United Arab Emirates) Ali Al-Wehaibi
DF	6	(United Arab Emirates) Mohamed Hamdoon (C) (substituted in)
MF	10	(United Arab Emirates) Rami Yaslam
FW	26	(United Arab Emirates) Faisal Ali
DF	–	(United Arab Emirates) Ali Msarri
MF	9	(United Arab Emirates) Shehab Ahmed
Manager:
(Romania) Anghel Iordănescu

NOTE

- Not Playing.
- (United Arab Emirates) Humaid Fakher (Third yellow card)

GK	1	(United Arab Emirates) Adel Anas
DF	2	(United Arab Emirates) Abdulrahman Ibrahim (yellow card)
DF	6	(United Arab Emirates) Jalil Abdulrahman
DF	8	(United Arab Emirates) Saeed Yousif (yellow card)
DF	20	(United Arab Emirates) Ali Abdullah (VC)
MF	5	(United Arab Emirates) Omran Mohamed
FW	11	(United Arab Emirates) Rashid Ahmed (substituted off)
FW	7	(United Arab Emirates) Ibrahim Saif
FW	14	(Netherlands) Geert Brusselers
FW	19	(Senegal) Cheikh Diop
FW	21	(United Arab Emirates) Jasim Mohammed (C) (substituted off)
Substitutes:
MF	15	(United Arab Emirates) Sameer Ibrahim	Substituted in
MF	16	(United Arab Emirates) Yousif Ahmed	Substituted in
Manager:
(Federal Republic of Yugoslavia) Dragan Scocovic

2001 UAE President's Cup winners
Al Ain
2nd Title
