= UAE Handball Super Cup =

- Founded: 1999
- Country: United Arab Emirates
- Confederation: AHF
- Number of clubs: 14
- Level on pyramid: 1
- Current champions: Al Nasr (4 titles) (2014–15 UAE Handball Super Cup)
- Most championships: Al Ahli (10 titles)
- TV partners: Abu Dhabi Sports, Dubai Sports
- Website: www.uaehandball.com

The UAE Handball Super Cup is one of the professional handball competitions in the United Arab Emirates (UAE). The Super Cup was founded in 1999 as the UAE Handball Super Cup. The first 1999–00 season was won by Al Nasr.

== List of champions ==
- 1999–00: Al-Nasr Dubai SC
- 2000–01: Al-Ahli
- 2001–02: Al-Nasr Dubai SC
- 2002–03: Al-Ahli
- 2003–04: Al-Nasr Dubai SC
- 2004–05: Al-Ahli
- 2005-06: Al-Wasl
- 2006-07: Al-Ahli
- 2007-08: Al-Ahli
- 2008–09: Al-Ahli
- 2009–10: Al-Shabab
- 2010-11: Al-Ahli
- 2011-12: Al-Ahli
- 2012-13: Al-Ahli
- 2013-14: Al-Ahli
- 2014-15: Al-Nasr Dubai SC

== Champions ==
=== Performance by club ===
Club	Winners
Al-Ahli	10
Al-Nasr	4
Al-Wasl	1
Al-Shabab	1
