= 2010–11 Etisalat Emirates Cup =

Tournament details
- Country: United Arab Emirates
- Teams: 12

Final positions
- Champions: Al Shabab
- Runners-up: Al Ain

Tournament statistics
- Matches played: 63
- Goals scored: 179 (2.84 per match)
- Top goal scorer(s): (Guinea) Ismaël Bangoura (Guinea) Aboubacar Camara (France) Michaël N'dri (7 each)

The 2010–11 Etisalat Emirates Cup is the third season of the league cup competition for teams in the UAE Pro-League.

== Group stage ==
=== Group A ===
Team	Pld	W	D	L	GF	GA	GD	Pts
Al Ain	10	5	4	1	15	8	+7	19
Al Wahda	10	5	2	3	12	9	+3	17
Al Dhafra	10	4	3	3	15	15	0	15
Al Nasr	10	3	3	4	11	13	−2	12
Dubai	10	2	4	4	21	21	0	10
Bani Yas	10	2	2	6	10	19	−9	8

Source: UAEProLeague.com
2010-10-09

Al Wahda	0–2	Al Ain

Al Nasr	1–2	Bani Yas

2010-10-10

Dubai Club	2–2	Al Dhafra

2010-11-04

Al Ain	1–1	Dubai Club

2010-11-05

Al Dhafra	1–1	Al Nasr

Bani Yas	2–1	Al Wahda

2010-11-12

Dubai Club	3–4	Al Nasr

2010-11-13

Al Wahda	1–1	Al Dhafra

Al Ain	0–0	Bani Yas

2010-11-19

Bani Yas	0–2	Dubai Club

Al Nasr	1–0	Al Wahda

2010-11-20

Al Dhafra	1–3	Al Ain

2010-11-25

Al Wahda	4–2	Dubai Club

2010-11-26

Bani Yas	1–2	Al Dhafra

Al Ain	1–1	Al Nasr

2010-11-30

Dubai Club	1–1	Al Wahda

2010-12-02

Al Nasr	0–2	Al Ain

2010-12-03

Bani Yas	0–2	Al Dhafra

2010-12-30

Al Ain	3–2	Al Dhafra

2010-12-31

Dubai Club	6–3	Bani Yas

Al Wahda	1–0	Al Nasr

2011-01-07

Al Nasr	1–1	Dubai Club

Bani Yas	1–1	Al Ain

Al Dhafra	0–1	Al Wahda

2011-01-14

Al Nasr	0–1	Al Dhafra

Dubai Club	1–2	Al Ain

Al Wahda	2–0	Bani Yas

2011-01-21

Al Ain	0–1	Al Wahda

Al Dhafra	3–2	Dubai Club

Bani Yas	1–2	Al Nasr

=== Group B ===
Team	Pld	W	D	L	GF	GA	GD	Pts
Al Shabab	10	5	3	2	13	9	+4	18
Al Wasl	10	4	4	2	11	9	+2	16
Al Sharjah	10	3	5	2	11	13	−2	14
Ittihad Kalba	10	2	6	2	10	10	0	12
Al Jazira	10	2	4	4	14	14	0	10
Al Ahli	10	1	4	5	11	17	−6	7

Source: UAEProLeague.com
2010-10-09

Al-Ittihad Kalba	1–1	Al Ahli

2010-10-10

Al-Sharjah	0–0	Al Wasl

Al-Jazira	0–1	Al-Shabbab

2010-11-04

Al-Shabbab	0–0	Al-Ittihad Kalba

Al Wasl	2–2	Al-Jazira

2010-11-05

Al Ahli	5–2	Al-Sharjah

2010-11-12

Al-Jazira	3–1	Al Ahli

Al-Shabbab	0–1	Al Wasl

2010-11-13

Al-Ittihad Kalba	0–0	Al-Sharjah

2010-11-19

Al Ahli	0–1	Al-Shabbab

2010-11-20

Al Wasl	0–0	Al-Ittihad Kalba

Al-Sharjah	1–3	Al-Jazira

2010-11-25

Al Wasl	2–0	Al Ahli

Al-Jazira	2–2	Al-Ittihad Kalba

2010-11-26

Al-Shabbab	1–1	Al-Sharjah

2010-12-02

Al-Ittihad Kalba	2–1	Al-Jazira

Al-Sharjah	1–1	Al-Shabbab

2010-12-03

Al Ahli	2–3	Al Wasl

2010-12-30

Al-Jazira	1–2	Al-Sharjah

Al-Shabbab	4–3	Al Ahli

2010-12-31

Al-Ittihad Kalba	2–0	Al Wasl

2010-12-31

Al Ahli	0–0	Al-Jazira

Al-Sharjah	3–2	Al-Ittihad Kalba

Al Wasl	2–1	Al-Shabbab

2011-01-15

Al-Ittihad Kalba	0–2	Al-Shabbab

Al-Sharjah	0–0	Al Ahli

Al-Jazira	1–1	Al Wasl

2011-01-22

Al Ahli	1–1	Al-Ittihad Kalba

Al-Shabbab	2–1	Al-Jazira

Al Wasl	0–1	Al-Sharjah

== Semi-finals ==
2011-03-10

Al Ain	3 - 2	Al Wasl

2011-03-10

Al-Shabbab	3 - 1	Al Wahda

== Final ==
29 April 2011
19:35 (GMT+4)

Al Ain	2 – 3	Al Shabab
Al Wehaibi 18'	(Report)	87' Júlio César; 70', 90+3' Ciel

Mohammad bin Zayed Stadium, Abu Dhabi
Attendance: 8,027
Referee: Ali Hamad

Etisalat Emirates Cup
2010–11 winners

1st title

== Top goalscorers ==
Last updated 2 May 2011

Goalscorers	Goals	Team
(Guinea) Ismaël Bangoura	7	Al Nasr
(Guinea) Aboubacar Camara	7	Dubai
(France) Michael N'dri	7	Dubai
(Brazil) Ciel	5	Al Shabab
(Brazil) Fernando Baiano	5	Al Wahda
(Brazil) Marcelinho	5	Al Sharjah
(Burkina Faso) Aristide Bancé	4	Al Ahli
(Ivory Coast) Boris Kabi	4	Al Dhafra
(United Arab Emirates) Eissa Ali	4	Al Wasl
(Argentina) Jose Sand	4	Al Ain
(Ivory Coast) Juma Saeed	4	Al Ain
(United Arab Emirates) Ali Mabkhout	4	Al Jazira
