= Yasser Abdullah =

Emirati footballer (born 1988)

Personal information
- Full name: Yasser Abdullah Al-Junaibi
- Date of birth: 10 May 1988 (age 38)
- Place of birth: United Arab Emirates
- Height: 1.78 m (5 ft 10 in)
- Position: Defender

Youth career
- Al Wahda

Senior career*
Years	Team	Apps	(Gls)
2007–2010	Al Wahda		
2010–2011	Al Dhafra		
2011–2013	Al-Sharjah		
2013–2017	Ittihad Kalba		
2017–2018	Al Dhafra		
2018–2020	Dibba Al-Fujairah		
2020–2021	Hatta		
2020–2021	→ Al Bataeh (loan)		
2021–2022	Al Bataeh		
2022–2023	Dibba Al-Hisn		
2023–2024	Al Dhafra		
- * Club domestic league appearances and goals

Yasser Abdullah (Arabic:ياسر عبد الله) (born 10 May 1988) is an Emirati footballer. He currently plays as a defender.
