= Hamad Al-Ahbabi =

Emirati footballer (born 1991)

Personal information
- Full name: Hamad Raqea Al-Ahbabi
- Date of birth: 4 January 1991 (age 35)
- Place of birth: United Arab Emirates
- Height: 1.75 m (5 ft 9 in)
- Position: Striker

Youth career
- Al Ain

Senior career*
Years	Team	Apps	(Gls)
2010–2015	Al Ain		
2012–2014	→ Al Dhafra (loan)		
2015–2017	Al Dhafra		
2017–2020	Baniyas		
- * Club domestic league appearances and goals

Hamad Al-Ahbabi (Arabic: حمد الأحبابي; born 4 January 1991) is an Emirati footballer who plays as a striker.
