= Sultan Musabah =

Emirati footballer (born 1988)

Personal information
- Full name: Sultan Musabah Al-Dhahri
- Date of birth: 29 October 1988 (age 38)
- Place of birth: United Arab Emirates
- Height: 1.84 m (6 ft 1/2 in)
- Position: Goalkeeper

Youth career
- Al-Ain

Senior career*
Years	Team	Apps	(Gls)
2010–2011	Al-Ain		
2011–2017	Baniyas		
- * Club domestic league appearances and goals

Sultan Musabah is an Emirati footballer.
