= Essam Dhahi =

Emirati footballer (born 1980)

Personal information
- Full name: Essam Dhahi Salmeen
- Date of birth: 19 April 1980 (age 46)
- Place of birth: United Arab Emirates
- Height: 1.86 m (6 ft 1 in)
- Position: Defender

Youth career
- Al Shabab

Senior career*
Years	Team	Apps	(Gls)
2003–2013	Al Shabab		
2013–2014	Al Ahli		
2013–2014	→ Al Shabab (loan)	21	(0)
2014–2017	Al Nasr	37	(0)
- * Club domestic league appearances and goals

Essam Dhahi (Arabic:عصام ضاحي) (born 19 April 1980) is an Emirati footballer.
