= Adel Basulaiman =

Emirati footballer (born 1982)

Personal information
- Full name: Adel Abdullah Ba Sulaiman
- Date of birth: 6 June 1982 (age 44)
- Place of birth: United Arab Emirates
- Height: 1.72 m (5 ft 7 1/2 in)
- Position: Left-back

Youth career
- Hatta

Senior career*
Years	Team	Apps	(Gls)
2003–2009	Hatta		
2009–2012	Al-Dhafra		
2012–2016	Al-Wahda		
2016–2018	Ajman Club		
- * Club domestic league appearances and goals

Adel Abdullah (Arabic:عادل عبد الله) (born 6 June 1982) is an Emirati footballer.
