= Sultan Nasser =

Emirati footballer (born 1990)

Personal information
- Full name: Sultan Nasser Hareb Abdullah Al Shamsi
- Date of birth: 9 April 1990 (age 36)
- Place of birth: United Arab Emirates
- Height: 1.72 m (5 ft 8 in)
- Position: Midfielder

Youth career
- Al-Ain

Senior career*
Years	Team	Apps	(Gls)
2010–2014	Al-Ain	6	(0)
2014	Ittihad Kalba	3	(0)
- * Club domestic league appearances and goals

Sultan Nasser (Arabic: سلطان ناصر; born 9 April 1990) is an Emirati footballer.
