= Abdulaziz Fayez Al Alawi =

Emirati footballer (born 1990)

Abdulaziz Fayez
Personal information
- Full name: Abdulaziz Fayez; Subait Khalifa Al Alawi
- Date of birth: 17 June 1990 (age 36)
- Place of birth: Al Ain, UAE
- Height: 1.71 m (5 ft 7 in)
- Position: Winger

Youth career
- 2009: Al Ain

Senior career*
Years	Team	Apps	(Gls)
2009–2016	Al Ain	6	(2)
2014–2015	→ Al-Wasl F.C. (loan)		

International career^{‡}
2008–	United Arab Emirates	13	(0)
- * Club domestic league appearances and goals as of 7 May 2010 ‡ National team caps and goals as of 21 March 2016

Abdulaziz Fayez Subait Khalifa Al Alawi (Arabic: عبدالعزيز فايز) (born 17 June 1990) is an Emirati footballer commonly known as Azooz or Abdulaziz Fayez, who currently plays as a winger.

== Early life ==
Abdulaziz was born on 17 June 1990, in Al Ain, UAE, he descended from a family sport, his father Fayez Subait was a player in the Al Ain Club and his brothers too, play in same club, Fawzi as right defender, Mohammed as left defender, hazza as centre forward, he is the third son in the family.

== Club career ==
=== Al Ain ===
==== 2009–10 season ====
This season was the first to Abdulaziz with the first team, And began this season when he was selected by coach Winfried Schaefer, to accompany the first team to camp outside in Switzerland and Spain, On 30 December 2009, Abdulaziz play his first match with the Al Ain first team ، against Bani Yas in an Etisalat Emirates Cup second-leg match being substituted for Shehab Ahmed in the 46th minute, and the match ended 1-1, On 9 April 2010, Azooz play his first Clasico match against Al-Wahda, and ended 0-1 for Al-Wahda.

=== Club ===
Club	Season	League			Cup^{2}			Asia^{1}			Total		
Club	Season	Apps	Goals	Assists	Apps	Goals	Assists	Apps	Goals	Assists	Apps	Goals	Assists
Al Ain U19	2009–10	5	8	1	-	-	-	-	-	-	5	8	1
Al Ain U19	Total	5	8	1	-	-	-	-	-	-	5	8	1
Al Ain B	2009–10	7	1	0	-	-	-	-	-	-	7	1	0
Al Ain B	Total	7	1	0	-	-	-	-	-	-	7	1	0
Al Ain	2009–10	6	2	0	1	0	0	4	0	0	11	2	0
Al Ain	Total	6	2	0	1	0	0	4	0	0	11	2	0
Career Totals		18	11	1	1	0	0	4	0	0	23	11	1

^{1}Continental competitions include the AFC Champions League
^{2}Other tournaments include the UAE Super Cup, UAE President Cup and Etisalat Emirates Cup
