= Ismail Rabee =

Emirati footballer (born 1983)

Personal information
- Full name: Ismail Rabee Juma
- Date of birth: January 11, 1983 (age 43)
- Place of birth: UAE
- Position: Goalkeeper

Youth career
- Al-Shabab

Senior career*
Years	Team	Apps	(Gls)
2000–2009	Al-Shabab		
2009–2011	Al-Nasr		
2011–2012	Al Ain		
2011–2012	→ Al-Shabab (loan)		
2014–2014	Al-Shabab		
2014–2015	Al-Wasl		
2015–2016	Al-Shaab		
2017–2018	Emirates Club		
2018–2019	Al-Taawon		

International career
2003–2010	UAE		
- * Club domestic league appearances and goals

Ismail Rabee Juma (Arabic: إسماعيل ربيع جمعة; born 11 January 1983) is an Emirati footballer who currently plays as a goalkeeper, who played at 2007 AFC Asian Cup.
