= Abdullah Sultan (footballer) =

Emirati footballer (born 1986)

Personal information
- Full name: Abdullah Sultan Ahmed Muftah Al Nasseri
- Date of birth: 9 April 1986 (age 40)
- Place of birth: United Arab Emirates
- Height: 1.91 m (6 ft 3 in)
- Position: Goalkeeper

Team information
- Current team: Al Dhafra
- Number: 30

Youth career
- Al Ain

Senior career*
Years	Team	Apps	(Gls)
2007–2013	Al Ain		
2013–2023	Al Dhafra	125	(0)
2018	→ Ajman (loan)	6	(0)
2018–2019	→ Dibba Al Fujairah (loan)	17	(0)
2023–2024	Baniyas	0	(0)
2024–	Al Dhafra	0	(0)
- * Club domestic league appearances and goals as of 22:33, 20 December 2022 (UTC)

Abdullah Sultan Ahmed Muftah Al Nasseri (Arabic: عبد الله سلطان أحمد مفتاح الناصري; born 9 April 1986), also known as Abdullah Sultan, is an Emirati professional footballer who plays for Al Dhafra as goalkeeper.
