= Saif Mohammed Al Bishr =

Emirati footballer (born 1983)

Saif Mohammed
Personal information
- Full name: Saif Mohammed Al-Bishr
- Date of birth: 15 September 1983 (age 43)
- Place of birth: United Arab Emirates
- Height: 1.69 m (5 ft 6 1/2 in)
- Position: Winger

Youth career
- Al-Shaab

Senior career*
Years	Team	Apps	(Gls)
2003–2008	Al-Shaab		(6)
2008–2012	Al-Ain	12	(4)
2011–2012	→ Al-Shaab (loan)		
2012–2016	Al-Dhafra		
2016–2017	Al-Shaab		
2017–2018	Al-Sharjah		
2018–2020	Khor Fakkan		

International career
2006–2009	UAE	12	(1)
- * Club domestic league appearances and goals

Saif Mohammed Al-Bishr (Arabic: سيف محمد آل بشر; born 15 September 1983) is an Emarati footballer . He is a lift winger and sometimes plays forward. In July 2008 he was transferred to Al Ain FC For A Reported 12 million Dirhams making him the second most expensive player to be transferred in the UAE League the first being his teammate at Al Ain FC Abdullah Malallah for 15 million Dirhams. Saif made his first appearance in the UAE League back in 2004.

== Club career ==
=== Al Ain FC ===
Saif was finally transferred to Al Ain FC in the summer of 2008, after a long negotiation period with his previous club Al-Shaab, Al Ain finally got the youngster for 15 million AED.

He played 5 matches in 2010 AFC Champions League.

== International career ==
Mohammed has made several appearances for the senior United Arab Emirates national football team, including five qualifying matches for the 2010 FIFA World Cup.

== Career statistics ==
=== Club ===
As of 23 September 2009

Club	Season	League			Cup^{2}			Asia^{1}			Total		
Club	Season	Apps	Goals	Assists	Apps	Goals	Assists	Apps	Goals	Assists	Apps	Goals	Assists
Al Ain	2009–10	2	0	0	2	1	0	0	0	0	4	1	0
Al Ain	Total	2	0	0	2	1	0	0	0	0	4	1	0
Career Totals		2	0	0	2	1	0	0	0	0	4	1	0

^{1}Continental competitions include the AFC Champions League
^{2}Other tournaments include the UAE Super Cup, UAE President Cup and Etisalat Emirates Cup

== Honours ==
=== Club ===
Al Ain FC

- Etisalat Emirates Cup: 2008/2009
- UAE President Cup: 2008/2009
- UAE Super Cup: 2009
