= Abu Dhabi Sports =

Emirati television channel dedicated to sport

- Logo used since 2023
- Country: United Arab Emirates
- Broadcast area: MENA and Worldwide
- Network: Abu Dhabi Media Network
- Headquarters: Abu Dhabi, United Arab Emirates

Programming
- Languages: Arabic; English
- Picture format: 1080p MPEG-4, 16:9 HDTV

Ownership
- Owner: Government of Abu Dhabi

History
- Launched: September 15, 1998; 27 years ago

Links
- Website: www.adsports.ae

Availability

Streaming media
- Abu Dhabi Sports: Watch live (AD Sports 1-2)

Abu Dhabi Sports or AD Sports (Arabic: أبوظبي الرياضيّة) is an Arabic television channel. It broadcasts from Abu Dhabi, capital of the United Arab Emirates and is owned by Abu Dhabi Media. Abu Dhabi Sports Channel is an UAE Arab satellite channel broadcast from Abu Dhabi that also livestreams in the United States and Canada.

== Channels ==
- Abu Dhabi Sports 1 HD
- Abu Dhabi Sports 2 HD
- YAS Sports HD
- AD Fight HD

== Content ==
=== Football ===
- DFB-Pokal
- UAE Pro League
- Arabian Gulf Cup
- UAE League Cup
- UAE Super Cup

=== Basketball ===
The UAE has a national basketball team that competes in regional tournaments.

- United Arab Emirates national basketball team

=== Tennis ===
UAE has world-class tennis facilities and academies that contribute to the sport's growing popularity. The ATP and WTA event is held annually in Dubai and attracts top tennis players from around the world.

- Mubadala World Tennis Championship Exhibition tournament
- Moselle Open
- Luxembourg Open

=== Motorsport ===
UAE has developed world-class facilities and hosts a variety of high-profile international and regional motorsport events.

- 24 Hours of Nürburgring
- Macau GP
- FIA Abu Dhabi Desert Challenge

=== Combat Sports ===
UAE has become a major hub for various combat sports, hosting international events, developing local talent, and promoting martial arts among the young mass.

- Jiu jitsu (UAE)
- UFC
- UAE Warriors

=== Cycling ===
- Tour de France

=== TV blocks ===
- Manchester City TV
- Roma TV
- Juventus TV
- Lazio TV
- FC Bayern TV

== Frequencies ==
- Eutelsat 7 West A (7.3W):
  - Channels: Abu Dhabi Sports 1 HD, 2 HD, Yas Sports HD (FTA, all HD)
  - Frequency: 11411.
  - Polarization: Horizontal.
  - Symbol Rate: 30000.
  - FEC: 3/4

== Revamp ==
In October 2008, Abu Dhabi Al Riyadiya went online with a new identity, logo, and programs.

On 8 August 2015, Abu Dhabi Sports changed the logo with a new look.

On 19 February 2020, Abu Dhabi Sports got a new logo after five years.

On 19 September 2023, Abu Dhabi Sports unveiled after 3 years of the old one.
