= Hamad Al Marri =

Emirati footballer (born 1991)

Personal information
- Full name: Hamad Ali Mohamed Saeed Al Marri
- Date of birth: 12 January 1991 (age 35)
- Place of birth: United Arab Emirates
- Height: 1.71 m (5 ft 7 in)
- Position: Defensive midfielder

Youth career
- Al-Ain

Senior career*
Years	Team	Apps	(Gls)
2010–2014	Al-Ain	8	(0)
2012–2013	→ Al Dhafra (loan)	0	(0)
2014–2015	Ittihad Kalba	1	(0)
- * Club domestic league appearances and goals

Hamad Al Marri (Arabic: حمد المري; born 12 January 1991) is an Emirati footballer.
