= Haddaf Al-Ameri =

Emirati footballer (born 1992)

Personal information
- Full name: Haddaf Abdullah Al-Ameri
- Date of birth: 21 November 1992 (age 33)
- Place of birth: United Arab Emirates
- Height: 1.68 m (5 ft 6 in)
- Position: Midfielder

Youth career
- Al Ain

Senior career*
Years	Team	Apps	(Gls)
2010–2012	Al Ain	4	(0)
2012–2017	Al Dhafra	9	(0)
2016–2017	→ Ajman (loan)	32	(2)

International career
2008–2011	UAE U17	0	(0)
- * Club domestic league appearances and goals as of 19 February 2012

Haddaf Abdullah Al-Ameri (Arabic: هداف عبدالله العامري; born 21 November 1992) is a former Emirati footballer who played as a midfielder.
