= Brahima Keita =

Ivorian footballer

Personal information
- Full name: Brahima Keita
- Date of birth: 1 January 1985 (age 41)
- Place of birth: Abidjan, Côte d'Ivoire
- Height: 1.86 m (6 ft 1 in)
- Position: Midfielder

Senior career*
Years	Team	Apps	(Gls)
1999–2002	CS Louhans-Cuiseaux	11	(0)
2002–2003	Académie Cyril Domoraud	2	(0)
2003–2005	Fahaheel	14	(1)
2005–2014	Al Qadisiya	147	(29)
2010–2011	→ Al-Ain FC (loan)	8	(1)
2014–2017	Al-Salmiya SC	82	(6)
2017–2018	Al-Arabi SC	30	(2)
2019	Al-Shamal		
- * Club domestic league appearances and goals as of 01:49, 6 January 2017 (UTC) ‡ National team caps and goals as of 01:49, 21 April 2008 (UTC)

Brahima Keita (born 1 January 1985) is an Ivorian footballer.
