= Dubai Sports =

Emirati television channel dedicated to sport

- Country: United Arab Emirates
- Broadcast area: MENA
- Headquarters: Dubai, United Arab Emirates

Programming
- Languages: Arabic; English
- Picture format: 1080p MPEG-4 16:9 HDTV

Ownership
- Owner: Dubai Media Incorporated

History
- Launched: December 18, 1998; 27 years ago

Links
- Website: www.dubaisports.ae

Availability

Streaming media
- AWAAN: Watch live 1 Watch live 2 Watch live 3 Watch live (Racing)

Dubai Sports is a 24/7 sports channel based in Dubai, United Arab Emirates. The channel started in 1998 to be the home for sports news around the country and was awarded the privilege of showing different sports events locally and worldwide. It is one of the channels of Dubai Media Incorporated. It is well known for broadcasting Bundesliga from 2005 to 2015 for free in MENA. Currently, Dubai Sports is the home of Dutch Football.

== Channels ==
- Dubai Sports 1
- Dubai Sports 2
- Dubai Sports 3 (Streaming)
- Dubai Racing 1
- Dubai Racing 2
- Dubai Racing 3 (Streaming)

== Sporting events ==
=== Football ===
- Eredivisie
- KNVB Cup
- Johan Cruyff Shield
- Série A
- Primera División
- Allsvenskan (1 game per week)
- A-League
- CONCACAF Nations League
- NWSL (2 games per week)
- WSL
- Vrouwen Eredivisie
- UAE Pro League
- Arabian Gulf Cup
- UAE League Cup
- UAE Super Cup

=== Basketball ===
- EuroLeague

=== Motorsport ===
- NASCAR
- Cup Series
- NASCAR Xfinity Series
- NASCAR Craftsman Truck Series

=== Rugby ===
==== Rugby league ====
- English Super League
