= André Dias (footballer, born 1981) =

Brazilian footballer

Personal information
- Full name: André Felippe Seixas Dias
- Date of birth: 11 March 1981 (age 45)
- Place of birth: Montes Claros, Brazil
- Height: 1.79 m (5 ft 10 in)
- Position: Striker

Youth career
- 1999–2000: Mirassol

Senior career*
Years	Team	Apps	(Gls)
2000–2002	Santos		
2003	Juventus-SP		
2003	Spartak Moscow	1	(0)
2004	São Bento		
2005	Mirassol		
2005	Paraná		
2006	Iraty		
2007	→ Vasco da Gama (Loan)	11	(5)
2007	→ Al-Wasl (Loan)		
2008–2009	Al-Ain	15	(20)
2011	Cruzeiro	4	(2)
2011	América-MG	10	(5)
2012	Villa Nova-MG		
2012–2013	Botafogo-SP		
2013	Santa Cruz		
2015–2016	Democrata		
- * Club domestic league appearances and goals

André Felippe Seixas Dias or simply André Dias (born 11 March 1981), is a Brazilian former football striker.

== Honours ==
Santos

- Brazilian League: 2002

Spartak Moscow

- Russian Cup 2003

Al Ain FC

- Etisalat Emirates Cup: 2008/2009
- UAE President Cup: 2008/2009

Cruzeiro

- Campeonato Mineiro: 2011

Santa Cruz

- Campeonato Pernambucano: 2013

== Contract ==
- Al-Wasl (Loan) 19 July 2007 to 14 July 2008
- Al Ain FC 15 July 2008
