= Ciel (footballer) =

Brazilian footballer (born 1982)

Personal information
- Full name: Jociel Ferreira da Silva
- Date of birth: 31 March 1982 (age 44)
- Place of birth: Caruaru, PE, Brazil
- Height: 1.79 m (5 ft 10 in)
- Position: Forward

Team information
- Current team: CSA

Senior career*
Years	Team	Apps	(Gls)
2005	Santa Cruz	2	(0)
2006	Salgueiro		
2006	Icasa	1	(0)
2007	Ceará	7	(3)
2007	Busan I'Park	13	(1)
2008	Ceará	21	(4)
2008–2010	Villa Rio		
2008	→ Fluminense (loan)	7	(0)
2009	→ América de Natal (loan)		
2009	→ Ceará (loan)	1	(0)
2009	→ Paços de Ferreira (loan)	14	(0)
2010	→ Corinthians Alagoano (loan)	2	(0)
2010	→ ASA (loan)	21	(14)
1/2011–2013	Al Shabab Al Arabi	51	(27)
2013–2016	Al Ahli club	39	(17)
2016	Ceará	5	(0)
2016–2017	Ittihad Kalba	21	(11)
2017	Dibba Al-Fujairah	11	(2)
2018	Caucaia	6	(5)
2019	ASA	7	(3)
2019	Caucaia	23	(20)
2020	Guarany de Sobral	12	(6)
2020	Salgueiro	21	(8)
2020	→ Caucaia (loan)	14	(18)
2021	Sampaio Corrêa	31	(9)
2022	Tombense	39	(17)
2023–2025	Ferroviário	69	(37)
2025–	CSA	0	(0)
- * Club domestic league appearances and goals as of 24 December 2024

Jociel Ferreira da Silva (born 31 March 1982), shortly Ciel, is a Brazilian professional footballer who plays as a forward for CSA.

== Clubs ==
His previous club was Busan I'Park in South Korea, Ceará, Icasa, Salgueiro, América de Natal, Santa Cruz, Fluminense and Al Shabab Al Arabi Club .

== Career statistics ==
As of match played 24 December 2024.

Club	Season	League		Cup & Super Cup		AFC Champions League		League Cup		GCC Champions League		Total	
Club	Season	Apps	Goals	Apps	Goals	Apps	Goals	Apps	Goals	Apps	Goals	Apps	Goals
Al Shabab
Al Shabab	2010-11	11	6		1	-	-	10	5		3		15
Al Shabab	2011-12	18	11	0	0	6	2	10	5	-	-	34	18
Al Shabab	2012-13	22	10	4	2	7	1	5	2	-	-	38	15
Total		51	29		3	13	3	25	12		3		48
Shabab Al Ahli
Shabab Al Ahli	2013-14	24	11	5	1	-	-	8	5	-	-	37	17
Shabab Al Ahli	2014-15	1	0	0	0	6	0	1	0	-	-	8	0
Shabab Al Ahli	2015-16	14	6	3	3	-	-	1	0	-	-	18	9
Total		39	17	8	4	6	0	10	5	-	-	63	26
Al-Ittihad Kalba
Al-Ittihad Kalba	2016-2017	21	11	1	0	-	-	2	1			24	12
Total		21	11	1	0			2	1			24	12
Dibba Al Fujairah
Dibba Al Fujairah	2017-2018	7	2	0	0	-	-	2	2	-	-	9	4
Total		7	2	0	0	-	-	2	2	-	-	9	4
Career Total		118	57		7	19	3	39	20		3		90

Club	Season	League			State league		Cup		Continental		Other		Total	
Club	Season	Division	Apps	Goals	Apps	Goals	Apps	Goals	Apps	Goals	Apps	Goals	Apps	Goals
Ceará	2007	Série B	7	3	—		—		—		—		7	3
Ceará	2008	Série B	21	4	—		—		—		—		21	4
Ceará	2009	Série B	1	0	—		—		—		—		1	0
Ceará	2016	Série B	5	0	—		—		—		—		5	0
Paços de Ferreira	2009-10	Primeira Liga	10	0	—		2	0	—		2	0	14	0
ASA	2010	Série B	21	14	—		—		—		—		21	14
ASA	2019	Campeonato Alagoano	—		6	3	1	0	—		0	0	7	3
Caucaia	2018	Campeonato Cearense de Futebol - Série B	—		—		—		—		7	5	7	5
Caucaia	2019	Campeonato Cearense de Futebol - Série B	—		12	12	—		—		11	8	23	20
Caucaia	2020	Campeonato Cearense	—		—		—		—		7	10	7	10
Caucaia	2021	Campeonato Cearense	—		7	8	—		—		—		7	8
Caucaia	Total		—		19	20	—		—		25	23	44	43
Guarany	2020	Série C	12	6	—		—		—		0	0	12	6
Salgueiro	2020	Série D	11	3	4 (Note: Appearances in Campeonato Pernambucano)	1	0	0	—		0	0	15	4
Salgueiro	2021	Campeonato Pernambucano	—		3	1	0	0	—		3	3	6	4
Salgueiro	Total		11	3	7	2	—		—		3	3	21	8
Sampaio Corrêa	2021	Série B	31	9	4 (Note: Appearances in Campeonato Maranhense)	2	—		—		0	0	35	11
Tombense	2022	Série B	29	10	10 (Note: Appearances in Campeonato Mineiro)	7	3	1	—		0	0	42	18
Ferroviário	2023	Série D	14	12	9 (Note: Appearances in Campeonato Cearense)	5	2	1	—		10	4	35	22
Ferroviário	2024	Série C	17	7	9	3	2	0	—		1	0	29	10
Ferroviário	Total		31	19	18	8	4	1	—		11	4	64	32
Career total			179	68	62	42	10	2	0	0	41	30	293	142
