= Júlio César (footballer, born October 1979) =

Brazilian footballer

Julio Cesar
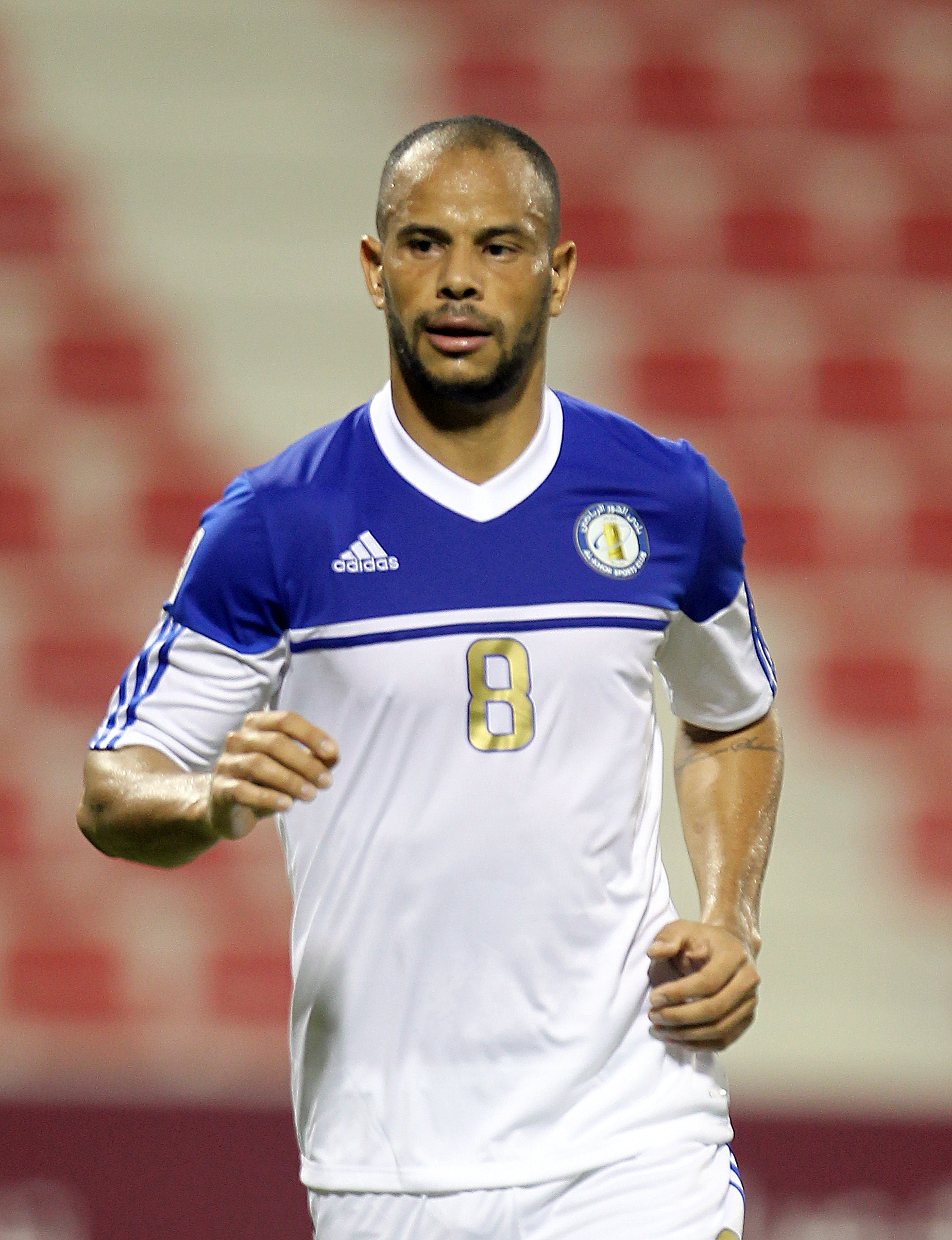

Personal information
- Full name: Julio Cesar do Nascimento
- Date of birth: 20 October 1979 (age 47)
- Place of birth: Recife, Brazil
- Height: 1.82 m (6 ft 0 in)
- Position: Midfielder

Youth career
- 1987: Sport Club do Recife

Senior career*
Years	Team	Apps	(Gls)
1997–2001	Sport Recife	16	(0)
2001	Campinense		
2001–2004	Paços de Ferreira	14	(0)
2004	→ Sanjoanense (loan)		
2005	Treze		
2005–2006	Operário		
2006–2008	Santa Clara	57	(18)
2008–2009	Athletico Paranaense	13	(2)
2009	→ Atlético Mineiro (loan)	2	(0)
2009–2010	Al Ahli Doha	17	(8)
2010–2012	Al Shabab Dubai	28	(15)
2012–2016	Al-Khor	100	(47)
2017	Santa Cruz	14	(2)
- * Club domestic league appearances and goals

Júlio César do Nascimento (born 20 October 1979) is a Brazilian former professional footballer who played as a midfielder.
