= Mohammed Salem Saleh =

Emirati footballer (born 1982)

Mohammed Salem
Personal information
- Full name: Mohammed Salem Saleh Al Saadi
- Date of birth: 28 October 1982 (age 44)
- Place of birth: United Arab Emirates
- Height: 1.74 m (5 ft 9 in)
- Position: Midfielder

Senior career*
Years	Team	Apps	(Gls)
–2011	Al Dhafra FC	41	(14)
2011–2015	Al Ain FC	0	(0)
2015–2016	Al-Shaab		
2016–2017	Ajman Club		
- * Club domestic league appearances and goals as of 14/9/2011

Mohammed Salem Saleh Al Saadi (Arabic: محمد سالم صالح الساعدي; born 28 October 1982) is an Emirati footballer who plays as a midfielder . Previously, he was captain of Al Dhafra SCC.
