= Elias Ribeiro =

Brazilian footballer (born 1983)

Personal information
- Full name: Elias Ribeiro de Oliveira
- Date of birth: 2 September 1983 (age 43)
- Place of birth: Santa Rita do Sapucaí, Brazil
- Height: 1.81 m (5 ft 11 in)
- Position: Attacking midfielder

Team information
- Current team: Iporá

Youth career
- 2000–2001: São Paulo
- 2002–2003: Bahia

Senior career*
Years	Team	Apps	(Gls)
2003–2008	Bahia	110	(30)
2007	Vasco da Gama	0	(0)
2008–2010	Fluminense	5	(0)
2008–2011	→ Atlético Goianiense (loan)	101	(44)
2011	Al Ain	19	(10)
2011	Figueirense	22	(4)
2012	Atlético Goianiense	7	(0)
2012–2014	Atlético Paranaense	33	(9)
2013	→ Ponte Preta (loan)	18	(3)
2014	→ Khazar Lankaran (loan)	14	(4)
2015	XV de Piracicaba	2	(0)
2015–2016	Fortaleza	8	(0)
2016	América-RN	8	(2)
2017	Aparecidense	13	(2)
2017	Anapolina	10	(2)
2018	Iporá	11	(8)
2018–2019	Vila Nova	46	(8)
2020	Goianésia	5	(1)
2020–	Iporá	6	(1)
- * Club domestic league appearances and goals as of 14:14, 14 September 2020 (UTC)

Elias Ribeiro de Oliveira, known as Elias (born in Santa Rita do Sapucaí, 2 September 1983), is a Brazilian professional footballer who plays as an attacking midfielder for Iporá.

== Career ==
=== Bahia ===
Began in the youth ranks of São Paulo, but was excused. "They São Paulo have a good base with great players, and at that time there was a waiver, they sent ten players though, and I was in the middle. But at seventeen, learned a lot and have evolved a lot over there," say, in 2010, told the newspaper Lance!. In 2003, he made his first professional game as the tricolor in Bahia Campeonato Brasileiro Serie A. He gradually been increasing and in 2006, the octagonal Series C, 2006, in Ba Vi, scored the first goal of the match and took the second goal. The game ended in victory for the Bahia 2–1.

=== Vasco ===
In early 2007, thanks to his performance by the tricolor, was loaned to Vasco da Gama, Romario to help make his thousandth goal. Getting there suffered from conjunctivitis and bruises, and had his loan contract renewed after four months.

=== Return to Bahia ===
On his return he scored a goal on his debut soon, and six more in the next fifteen games. In Bahia State Championship 2008 was the team's leading scorer tricolor, with twelve goals. In his hundredth game for the tricolor scored a goal in the defeat of Bahia for Marilia by 3 to 1. In Series B of 2008 was the playmaker of the moves and the "brain" of the team.

=== Fluminense ===
It was sold to Fluminense in September 2008 to replace former idol and tricolor das Laranjeiras Thiago Neves, who had been sold to Hamburg, Germany. No room at the club, was on loan at Atletico Goianiense in 2009. "There were two chances I had to go through big clubs," sorry in 2010, referring to Vasco and Fluminense, "but had no chance to show my work".

=== Atlético Goianiense ===
In 2009, he was on loan to Atlético-GO, and after a period in reserve, has become the main player on the team in the Brazilian Championship in 2010. Has disputed the artillery of the Brazilian Championship in 2010. " It is a particular goal, "he said in an interview to Lance! in September 2010. "Scoring goals and therefore fight for the artillery of the tournament only help the athletic as well." [1] Atletico coach, Rene Simoes, spared no praise for Elias Ribeiro interview in the same newspaper: "In my view, is half of frame extinction in Brazilian football. That Canhotinho that, apart from arriving at the peril ahead, give assistance to attackers.

=== Atlas de Guadalajara ===
Club Atlas de Guadalajara in Mexico, confirmed on 13 December 2010 the acquisition of Elias.

=== Al Ain ===
On 8 January 2011, he signed a six-month deal with UAE side Al Ain.

=== Figueirense ===
On 21 June 2011, he agreed to play for Figueirense before the contract with Al Ain expired. He signed a contract lasting until 31 December 2013.

=== Khazar Lankaran ===
On 31 January 2014, Elias Ribeiro joined Khazar Lankaran on an 18-month contract. Elias was released by Khazar at the end of June 2014, only six-months into his contract.

== Honours ==
Atlético Goianiense

- Campeonato Goiano: 2010

Fortaleza

- Campeonato Cearense: 2016
