= Musallem Fayez =

Emirati footballer (born 1987)

Musallem Fayez Alhamdani
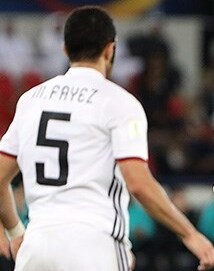
- Fayez playing for Al Jazira in 2017

Personal information
- Full name: Musallem Fayez Meftah Hamdan Al Hamdani
- Date of birth: 26/03/1987
- Place of birth: United Arab Emirates
- Height: 1.80 m (5 ft 11 in)
- Position: Defender

Youth career
- Al Ain

Senior career*
Years	Team	Apps	(Gls)
2003–2013	Al Ain	184	(10)
2013–2020	Al Jazira	138	(8)
2020–2024	Al-Dhafra	33	(2)

International career
- 2002-2018
- * Club domestic league appearances and goals

Musallem Fayez Muftah Hamdan Al Hamdani (Arabic: مسلم فايز مفتاح حمدان الحمداني; born 26 March 1987) is an Emarati footballer who plays as defender.
