= Ismail Ahmed (footballer, born 1983) =

Emirati footballer

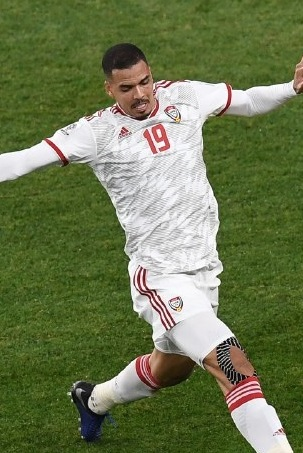
- Ismail with United Arab Emirates at the 2019 AFC Asian Cup

Personal information
- Full name: Ismail Ahmed Ismail Mohammed
- Date of birth: 7 July 1983 (age 43)
- Place of birth: Temara, Morocco
- Height: 1.91 m (6 ft 3 in)
- Position: Centre-back

Youth career
- 2005–2008: FUS de Rabat
- 2008–2009: Al Ain

Senior career*
Years	Team	Apps	(Gls)
2008–2021	Al Ain	192	(19)

International career^{‡}
2012–2019	United Arab Emirates	45	(1)
- * Club domestic league appearances and goals ‡ National team caps and goals as of 29 September 2023

Ismail Ahmed Ismail Mohammed (Arabic: إسماعيل أحمد إسماعيل محمد; born 7 July 1983), known by his patronymic Ismail Ahmed, is a former footballer who played as a centre-back. Born in Morocco, he represented the United Arab Emirates at international level.

== Personal life ==
Ismail Ahmed was born in Temara, Morocco, but moved to Yemen and Bahrain as a teenager to venture for his football passion. He was persuaded to play for the Bahraini national team, but rejected the offer to return to Morocco in order to play for his country's national side and league giants Raja Casablanca so he could head to Europe, but an injury ruined his career while the likes of Nordin Amrabat, Ayoub El Kaabi and Achraf Bencharki flourished. He soon accepted the offer to join Al Ain from his former club, FUS de Rabat, where he was granted Emirati passport. He retired in 2021.

== Honours ==
=== Club ===
Al Ain

- UAE Pro League: 2011–12, 2012–13, 2014–15, 2017–18
- UAE League Cup: 2008–09
- UAE President's Cup: 2008–09, 2013–14, 2017–18
- UAE Super Cup: 2009, 2012, 2015
- Emirati-Moroccan Super Cup: 2015
- AFC Champions League runner-up: 2016
- FIFA Club World Cup runner-up: 2018

=== International ===
UAE

- AFC Asian Cup third-place (1): 2015

=== Individual ===
- AFC Champions League All-Star Squad: 2016
