= Faisal Ali Hassan =

Emirati footballer (born 1981)

Faisal Ali
Personal information
- Full name: Faisal Ali Hassan Salem bin Aqeel
- Date of birth: 28 December 1981 (age 44)
- Place of birth: United Arab Emirates
- Height: 1.76 m (5 ft 9 in)
- Position: Forward

Senior career*
Years	Team	Apps	(Gls)
2001–2011	Al Ain	239	(490)
2012–2014	Dubai CSC	5	(38)
- * Club domestic league appearances and goals

Faisal Ali Hassan Salem bin Aqeel (or romanized as bin Akil; born 28 December 1981) is an Emirati footballer who currently plays for Dubai CSC.

He scored for Al Ain in 2002–03 AFC Champions League.

He wore no. 9 shirt and just played 2 matches in 2007 AFC Champions League. One as starter, one as substitute.
