= Rami Yaslam =

Emirati footballer (born 1981)

Personal information
- Full name: Rami Yaslam Al-Jaberi
- Date of birth: 11 June 1981 (age 45)
- Place of birth: United Arab Emirates
- Height: 1.69 m (5 ft 6 1/2 in)
- Position: Midfielder

Senior career*
Years	Team	Apps	(Gls)
2001–2012	Al-Ain		
2012–2014	Dubai Club		

International career
2003–2004	UAE	14	(2)
- * Club domestic league appearances and goals

Rami Yaslam Al-Jaberi (born 11 June 1981) is an Emirati footballer.
