= Shehab Ahmed =

Emirati footballer (born 1984)

Personal information
- Full name: Shehab Ahmed Salem Ali Alawlaqi
- Date of birth: March 29, 1984 (age 42)
- Place of birth: United Arab Emirates
- Height: 1.66 m (5 ft 5 1/2 in)
- Position: Midfielder

Youth career
- Al Ain FC

Senior career*
Years	Team	Apps	(Gls)
2002–2012	Al Ain FC	50	(11)
2012–2013	Ajman Club		

International career
2004–2005	United Arab Emirates	3	(0)
- * Club domestic league appearances and goals

Shehab Salem Ali Alawlaqi Ahmed (born 29 March 1984), is an Emirati association football midfielder who plays for Ajman Club and the UAE national team.

== Career in Al Ain FC ==
Shehab usually plays as a left midfielder but can also be useful as a winger or as left side back. He sometimes took the set pieces for Al Ain FC. He was also known for his fast flanks down the left side and his accurate crosses which favor the attackers of his team.

He used to be an important player to any coach who trains and used to start the majority of the matches but recently he has been benched due to several injuries that had followed him for almost two seasons.

He is nicknamed "Recoba" by his fans, this is because he shares the same playing style as that of Uruguayan footballer Alvaro Recoba.

After a long absence that lasted for almost two seasons, Shehab made a phenomenal comeback in the Etisalat Emirates Cup competition and scored the winning goal in the finale against Al-Wahda in the 73rd minute which handed Al Ain FC the first Etisalat Emirates Cup.

He left Al Ain in June 2012 to sign with Ajman Club.

== Honors ==
- UAE League Titles: 2002/2003, 2003/2004
- UAE Presidents Cup: 2003/2004, 2004/2005, 2008/2009
- AFC Champions League: 2003
- UAE FA Cup: 2004/2005, 2005/2006
- UAE Super Cup: 2002/2003, 2009/2010
- Reached the Quarter-Final of the 2003 FIFA World Youth Championship with The UAE National Team
- Etisalat Emirates Cup : 2008/2009

== Trivia ==
- Scored the opening goal in the UAE match against Panama in the 2003 FIFA World Youth Championship
- Scored a goal in both the semifinal and final of the 2005 AFC Champions League
