= Ali Al-Wehaibi =

Emirati footballer (born 1983)

Personal information
- Full name: Ali Ahmad Ali Mohammed Al-Wehaibi
- Date of birth: 27 October 1983 (age 42)
- Place of birth: Al Ain, United Arab Emirates
- Height: 1.69 m (5 ft 6 1/2 in)
- Position: Midfielder

Senior career*
Years	Team	Apps	(Gls)
2001–2017	Al Ain	195	(31)

International career^{‡}
2003–2013	United Arab Emirates	46	(4)
- * Club domestic league appearances and goals as of February 7, 2012 ‡ National team caps and goals as of January 19, 2012

Ali Ahmad Ali Mohammed Al-Wehaibi (Arabic: علي أحمد علي محمد الوهيبي; born 27 October 1983) is a former Emirati footballer. He last played as a midfielder for Al Ain.

Al-Wehaibi also played for and captained the United Arab Emirates national football team.

== Honours ==
Al Ain

- UAE Pro League: 2002/2003, 2003/2004
- UAE President's Cup: 2004/2005, 2005/2006, 2008/2009
- UAE FA Cup: 2004/2005, 2005/2006
- AFC Champions League: 2002–03
- UAE Super Cup 2002/2003, 2009/2010
- Etisalat Emirates Cup 2008/2009

== Career statistics ==
As of 28 September 2009

=== Club ===
Club	Season	League			Cup^{2}			Asia^{1}			Total		
Club	Season	Apps	Goals	Assists	Apps	Goals	Assists	Apps	Goals	Assists	Apps	Goals	Assists
Al Ain	2009–10	2	0	0	1	0	0	0	0	0	3	0	0
Al Ain	Total	2	0	0	1	0	0	0	0	0	3	0	0
Career totals		2	0	0	1	0	0	0	0	0	3	0	0

^{1}Continental competitions include the AFC Champions League.
^{2}Other tournaments include the UAE Super Cup, the UAE President's Cup and the Etisalat Emirates Cup.
