= 2020–21 UAE League Cup =

2020–21 Arabian Gulf League Cup
Tournament details
- Country: United Arab Emirates
- Dates: 8 October 2020 – 9 April 2021
- Teams: 14

Final positions
- Champions: Shabab Al Ahli (2nd title)
- Runners-up: Al Nasr

Tournament statistics
- Matches played: 24
- Goals scored: 58 (2.42 per match)
- Top goal scorer: Peniel Mlapa (5 goals)

The 2020–21 UAE League Cup was the 13th season of the UAE League Cup, Al Nasr were the defending champions after winning their second title against Shabab Al Ahli. The competition was set to start on September but it was postponed. The competition started on 8 October 2020. On 9 April, Shabab Al Ahli clinched the title after beating Al Nasr 5–4 on penalty shootout.

== First round ==
Source: soccerway
All times are local (UTC+04:00)

The first round consist of twelve teams excluding the defending champions and current league winners, this season has seen a format change in the league cup instead of its usual group stage format, to cut down on fixtures.

=== First leg ===
8 October 2020 First round	Kalba	2–1	Al Jazira	Kalba
18:30	Mlapa 22', 90'	Report	Kosanović 60'	Stadium: Ittihad Kalba Stadium; Referee: Yahya Al Mulla; Assistant referees: Ali Mohamed Al Nuaimi; Jasim Al Ajmi; Fourth official: Ibrahim Sultan

8 October 2020 First round	Hatta	0–2	Baniyas	Hatta
18:30		Report	Pedro 4'; Al-Hammadi 39'	Stadium: Hamdan Bin Rashid Stadium; Referee: Nawaf Al Zeyouidi; Assistant referees: Ibrahim Al Ajmi; Jasem Abdulla Al Ali; Fourth official: Ahmed Salem Khalfan

8 October 2020 First round	Fujairah	1–0	Ajman	Fujairah
21:00	Al-Yamahi 36' (o.g.)	Report		Stadium: Fujairah Club Stadium; Referee: Yousuf Al Shamali; Assistant referees: Masood Hassan Ismail; Waled Al Karmati; Fourth official: Mohamed Abdelkarim Al Zarouni

9 October 2020 First round	Shabab Al Ahli	1–1	Al Dhafra	Deira, Dubai
18:30	Cartabia 57' (pen.)	Report	Denílson 87'	Stadium: Rashid Stadium; Referee: Mohamed Al Harmoodi; Assistant referees: Ahmed Saeed Al Rashedi; Amer Hasan; Fourth official: Sultan Mohamed

9 October 2020 First round	Al Ain	2–4	Khor Fakkan	Al-Ain
18:30	Abdulrahman 45+2'; Pereira 71'	Report	Autonne 34'; Juninho 47'; Jumaa 48'; Lopes 82'	Stadium: Hazza Bin Zayed Stadium; Referee: Yousif Al Jasmi; Assistant referees: Mohammed Ahmed Yousuf; Mohamed Ali Al Shehhi; Fourth official: Mohomed Obaid Khadim

9 October 2020 First round	Al Wahda	1–2	Al Wasl	Al Nahyan, Abu Dhabi
21:00	Matar 11' (pen.)	Report	Noor 43'; João Figueiredo 90'	Stadium: Al Nahyan Stadium; Referee: Amer Al Dhubiea; Assistant referees: Hassan Suqatari Al Mahri; Yasser Al Murshidi; Fourth official: Mohammed Ali Mubarak Al Shabibi

=== Second leg ===
12 November 2020 First round	Baniyas	1–1 (3–1 agg.)	Hatta	Al Shamkha, Abu Dhabi
18:00	Giménez 36'	Report	Ramirez 74'	Stadium: Baniyas Stadium; Referee: Khalid Al Mulla; Assistant referees: Kais Al Khadem; Yasser Al Murshidi; Fourth official: Ahmed Hasan Al Hammadi

12 November 2020 First round	Ajman	1–2 (1–3 agg.)	Fujairah	Ajman
18:00	Shaitit 50'	Report	Larbi 61'; Rosa 65'	Stadium: Ajman Stadium; Referee: Sultan Mohamed; Assistant referees: Ahmed Al Hossani; Jasim Al Ajmi; Fourth official: Ahmed Mussabah Mubarak

12 November 2020 First round	Al Jazira	1–1 (2–3 agg.)	Kalba	Al Nahyan, Abu Dhabi
21:00	Bruno 45'	Report	Jshak 62'	Stadium: Mohammad Bin Zayed Stadium; Referee: Mohomed Obaid Khadim Mohd; Assistant referees: Amer Ali Al Qadri; Waled Al Karmati; Fourth official: Fahed Khalaf

13 November 2020 First round	Al Dhafra	0–3 (1–4 agg.)	Shabab Al Ahli	Madinat Zayed
18:00		Report	Jesus 11' (pen.); Al Blooshi 28', 50'	Stadium: Al Dhafra Stadium; Referee: Naser Al Ali; Assistant referees: Khamis Fayroz; Abdulla Al-Marzooqi; Fourth official: Ahmad Al Naqbi

13 November 2020 First round	Khor Fakkan	0–0 (4–2 agg.)	Al Ain	Khor Fakkan
18:00		Report		Stadium: Saqr bin Mohammad al Qassimi Stadium; Referee: Khalid Bu Hasan; Assistant referees: Hassan Ali Al Hammadi; Othman Al Maazmi; Fourth official: Hasan Al Blooshi

13 November 2020 First round	Al Wasl	2–0 (4–1 agg.)	Al Wahda	Zabeel, Dubai
21:00	João Figueiredo 26'; Neris 51'	Report		Stadium: Zabeel Stadium; Referee: Hamad Ali Yousef; Assistant referees: Mohammed Ghulaita Al Shehhi; Talal Rashed Al Nuaimi; Fourth official: Mohammed Abdulla Al Ali

== Quarter-finals ==
The quarter finals will have eight teams, six winners of the first round joined with defending champions (Al Nasr) and Sharjah who got a bye from the first round.

=== First leg ===
7 January 2021 Quarter-Finals	Khor Fakkan	2–4	Shabab Al Ahli	Khor Fakkan
17:00	Lamas 80'; Marzooq 83' (o.g.)	Report	Al Attas 12'; Héldon 19'; Carlos 42'; Cartabia 88' (pen.)	Stadium: Saqr bin Mohammad al Qassimi Stadium; Referee: Mohammed Obaid Khadim; Assistant referees: Hassan Suqatari Al Mahri; Qais Al Khaddeim; Fourth official: Mohammed Abdulla Al Ali

7 January 2021 Quarter-Finals	Al Nasr	1–1	Fujairah	Al Nasr, Dubai
20:00	Tozé 2'	Report	Armenteros 52'	Stadium: Al Maktoum Stadium; Referee: Mohamed Al Harmoodi; Assistant referees: Ahmed Saeed Ahmed Al Rashedi; Saeed Al-Marzooqi; Fourth official: Zayed Al Awakli

8 January 2021 Quarter-Finals	Baniyas	1–1	Kalba	Al Shamkha, Abu Dhabi
17:00	Pedro 70'	Report	Mlapa 57'	Stadium: Baniyas Stadium; Referee: Hamad Ali Yousef; Assistant referees: Jasem Abdulla Al Ali; Ali Saeed Al Naqbi; Fourth official: Ahmed Hasan Al Hammadi

8 January 2021 Quarter-Finals	Sharjah	0–0	Al Wasl	Sharjah
17:00		Report		Stadium: Sharjah Stadium; Referee: Mohamed Abdulla Hassan; Assistant referees: Sabet Obaid Suroor; Talal Rashed Al Nuaimi; Fourth official: Naser Al Ali

=== Second leg ===
25 January 2021 Quarter-Finals	Fujairah	0–1 (1–2 agg.)	Al Nasr	Fujairah
17:15		Report	Nasser 84' (o.g.)	Stadium: Fujairah Club Stadium; Referee: Ahmed Eisa Mohamed; Assistant referees: Sabet Obaid Suroor; Salah Salim; Fourth official: Ahmad Al Naqbi

25 January 2021 Quarter-Finals	Kalba	1–1 (2–2 agg.) (6–5 p)	Baniyas	Kalba
20:00	Abbas 33'	Report	Al-Shamsi 20'	Stadium: Ittihad Kalba Stadium; Referee: Mohamed Al Harmoodi; Assistant referees: Ali Mohamed Al Nuaimi; Ahmed Abdouli; Fourth official: Hasan Al Blooshi
	Penalties
	Jshak (penalty scored); Mlapa (penalty scored); Al Shehhi (penalty scored); Al Naqbi (penalty missed); Al Hosani (penalty scored); Rashed (penalty scored); Al-Khodaim (penalty scored)		(penalty scored) João Pedro; (penalty scored) Suárez; (penalty scored) Abunamous; (penalty scored) Al Zaabi; (penalty missed) Awana; (penalty scored) Al Moharrami; (penalty missed) Ivković

26 January 2021 Quarter-Finals	Shabab Al Ahli	5–0 (9–2 agg.)	Khor Fakkan	Deira, Dubai
17:15	Jesus 1'; Carlos 43'; Jumaa 44'; Al Attas 80'; Al-Bloushi 84'	Report		Stadium: Rashid Stadium; Referee: Omar Mohamed Al Ali; Assistant referees: Hassan Suqatari Al Mahri; Jasim Al Ajmi; Fourth official: Yousuf Hassan Al Shamali

26 January 2021 Quarter-Finals	Al Wasl	2–0 (2–0 agg.)	Sharjah	Zabeel, Dubai
20:00	H. Saleh 41'; Figueiredo 48' (pen.)	Report		Stadium: Zabeel Stadium; Referee: Adel Al Naqbi; Assistant referees: Mohammed Ahmed Yousuf; Hassan Ali Al Hammadi; Fourth official: Ahmed Hasan Al Hammadi

== Semi-finals ==
=== First leg ===
9 February 2021 Semi-Finals	Al Nasr	1–2	Kalba	Al Nasr, Dubai
17:30	Tozé 38'	Report	Mlapa 6' (pen.); Abdulhadi 18'	Stadium: Al-Maktoum Stadium; Referee: Omar Mohamed Al Ali

9 February 2021 Semi-Finals	Al Wasl	0–2	Shabab Al Ahli	Zabeel, Dubai
20:15		Report	Igor Jesus 36'; Jaber 82'	Stadium: Zabeel Stadium; Referee: Ahmed Salem Khalfan

=== Second leg ===
2 March 2021 Semi-Finals	Kalba	1–2 (3–3 agg.) (6–7 p)	Al Nasr	Kalba
17:30	Mlapa 82' (pen.)	Report	Mandes 39'; Saba 46'	Stadium: Ittihad Kalba Stadium; Referee: Adel Al Naqbi; Assistant referees: Ahmed Saeed Al Rashedi; Ahmed Abdouli; Fourth official: Mohamed Al Harmoodi
	Penalties
	Mlapa (penalty scored); Mariani (penalty missed); Linthorst (penalty scored); Adil (penalty scored); Al-Naqbi (penalty scored); Rashed (penalty scored); Al Khodaim (penalty scored); Sabeel (penalty missed)		(penalty scored) Tozé; (penalty scored) Mandes; (penalty scored) Tagliabúe; (penalty missed) Saba; (penalty scored) Khamees; (penalty scored) Gláuber; (penalty scored) Al-Bloushi; (penalty scored) Tarik

2 March 2021 Semi-Finals	Shabab Al Ahli	3–1 (5–1 agg.)	Al Wasl	Deira, Dubai
20:15	Cartabia 11', 52'; Igor Jesus 63'	Report	Lima 71' (pen.)	Stadium: Rashid Stadium; Referee: Omar Mohamed Al Ali; Assistant referees: Mohammed Ali Rashid Al Naimi; Mohamed Al Ma'azmi; Fourth official: Nawaf Al Zeyouidi

== Final ==
9 April 2021
19:05

Shabab Al Ahli	0–0	Al Nasr
	Report
Penalties
Eduardo (penalty missed); Al-Kamali (penalty scored); Jesus (penalty missed); Jumaa (penalty scored); Jaber (penalty scored); Sanqour (penalty scored); Masharipov (penalty scored)	5–4	(penalty missed) Tozé; (penalty scored) Valentini; (penalty scored) Tagliabúe; (penalty scored) Khamees; (penalty missed) Mendes; (penalty scored) Al-Bloushi; (penalty missed) Ayed

Sharjah Stadium, Sharjah
Referee: Omar Mohamed Al Ali

== Top scorers ==
As of 2 March 2021

Rank	Player	Club	Goals
1	(Togo) Peniel Mlapa	Kalba	5
2	(Argentina) Federico Cartabia	Shabab Al Ahli	4
2	(Brazil) Igor Jesus	Shabab Al Ahli	4
4	(United Arab Emirates) Saeed Ahmed	Shabab Al Ahli	3
4	(Brazil) João Figueiredo	Al Wasl	3
