= 2017–18 UAE President's Cup =

Tournament details
- Country: United Arab Emirates
- Dates: 22 September 2017 – 3 May 2018
- Teams: 16 (Knockout round); 24 (Total)

Final positions
- Champions: Al Ain (7th title)
- Runners-up: Al Wasl

Tournament statistics
- Matches played: 45
- Goals scored: 140 (3.11 per match)
- Top goal scorer: (Brazil) Caio (5 goals)
- All statistics correct as of 3 May 2018.

The 2017–18 UAE President's Cup was the 42nd edition of the UAE President's Cup. The competition started on 22 September 2017 and concluded on 3 May 2018. Al Ain defeated Al Wasl 2–1 in the finals to win their seventh title.

Al-Wahda were the defending champions, winning the tournament in 2016–17 season, they were knocked out in semi-finals, after losing 5–4 on penalties to Al Wasl.

== Group stage ==
=== Preliminary Group A ===
Team	Pld	W	D	L	GF	GA	GD	Pts
Fujairah	5	3	1	1	8	3	+5	10
Al Urooba	5	3	1	1	11	7	+4	10
Al Thaid	5	3	0	2	9	6	+3	9
Al Hamriyah	5	2	0	3	6	6	0	6
Masfut	5	1	2	2	7	11	−4	5
Masafi	5	1	0	4	4	12	−8	3

=== Preliminary Group B ===
Team	Pld	W	D	L	GF	GA	GD	Pts
Kalba	5	4	0	1	12	5	+7	12
Baniyas	5	3	1	1	9	5	+4	10
Khor Fakkan	5	3	1	1	10	8	+2	10
Dibba Al-Hisn	5	2	0	3	6	8	−2	6
Ras Al Khaimah	5	1	1	3	6	9	−3	4
Al-Arabi	5	0	1	4	4	12	−8	1

|}

== Bracket ==
As per UAE Football Association matches database:

Round of 16
Al Jazira	1
Kalba	0
Emirates	1
Al Wahda	2
Baniyas	2
Al Wasl	5
Al Nasr	1 (3)
Dibba Al Fujairah	1 (5)
Shabab Al-Ahli Dubai	1
Al Urooba	0
Ajman	0
Sharjah	2
Al Ain	1
Al Dhafra	0
Fujairah	3
Hatta	2

Quarter-finals
Al Jazira	0
Al Wahda	3
Al Wasl	1
Dibba Al Fujairah	0
Shabab Al-Ahli Dubai	1
Sharjah	0
Al Ain	4
Fujairah	2

Semi-finals
Al Wahda	3 (4)
Al Wasl	3 (5)
Shabab Al-Ahli Dubai	0
Al Ain	6

Final
Al Wasl	1
Al Ain	2

== Round 1 ==
15 January 2018	Shabab Al-Ahli Dubai	1–0	Al Urooba	Dubai
15:05	Erceg 27'			Stadium: Rashid Stadium

15 January 2018	Al-Fujairah SC	3–2 (a.e.t.)	Hatta Club	Fujairah
18:05	Khaled 61' Mousa 76' Haithem 120+1'		Gabriel 55' Samuel 90'	Stadium: Fujairah Club Stadium

16 January 2018	Al Jazira Club	1–0	Al-Ittihad Kalba	Abu Dhabi
15:05	Mabkhout 75'			Stadium: Mohammed bin Zayed Stadium

16 January 2018	Ajman Club	0–2	Sharjah FC	Ajman
20:05			Welliton 15' Vander 38' (pen.)	Stadium: Ajman Stadium

17 January 2018	Al Ain FC	1–0	Al Dhafra FC	Al Ain
17:05	Berg 22'			Stadium: Mohammed bin Zayed Stadium

17 January 2018	Baniyas Club	2–5	Al Wasl F.C.	Abu Dhabi
17:05	Alnofeli 45' Ahbabi 88'		Caio 2', 74', 90+2' Moharrami 10' (o.g.) Alnofeli 10' (o.g.)	Stadium: Baniyas Stadium

17 January 2018	Emirates Club	1–2 (a.e.t.)	Al Wahda FC	Ras Al Khaimah
20:05	Sáez 60'		Akbari 52' Shehhi 113'	Stadium: Emirates Club Stadium

17 January 2018	Al-Nasr Dubai SC	1–1 (a.e.t.) (3–5 p)	Dibba Al-Fujairah Club	Dubai
20:05	Cirino 70'		Waleed 11'	Stadium: Al-Maktoum Stadium
	Penalties
	(penalty scored) Cirino; (penalty scored) Jalal; (penalty missed) Sulaiman; (penalty scored) Khamees		(penalty scored) Silva; (penalty scored) Fettouhi; (penalty scored) Ibrahim; (penalty scored) Saeed; (penalty scored) Yamahi

== Quarterfinals ==
11 April 2018	Al Jazira	0–3	Al Wahda	Abu Dhabi
			Tagliabué 26' Dzsudzsák 30', 73'	Stadium: Mohammed bin Zayed Stadium

11 April 2018	Al Wasl	1–0	Dibba Al-Fujairah	Dubai
	Caio 79'			Stadium: Zabeel Stadium

12 April 2018	Al Ain	4–2	Al Fujairah	Al Ain
	Khalil 29' Shahat 30', 39' Caio 90+2'		Khamis 8' Khaled 53'	Stadium: Mohammed bin Zayed Stadium

12 April 2018	Shabab Al-Ahli Dubai	1–0	Al Sharjah	Dubai
	81'			Stadium: Rashid Stadium

== Semifinals ==
25 April 2018	Al Wahda	3–3 (a.e.t.) (4–5 p)	Al Wasl	Abu Dhabi
	Tagliabué 57', 82' Batna 112'		Lima 63' Canedo 74' Al Azizi 114'	Stadium: Al Nahyan Stadium
	Penalties
	(penalty missed) Tagliabué; (penalty scored) Rim Chang-woo; (penalty scored) Batna; (penalty scored) Burgosh; (penalty scored) Dzsudzsák		(penalty scored) Canedo; (penalty scored) Lima; (penalty scored) Cáceres; (penalty scored) Saleh; (penalty scored) Al-Naqbi

25 April 2018	Shabab Al-Ahli Dubai	0–6	Al Ain	Dubai
			Caio 4', 74' El Shahat 9' Berg 65' Khalil 82' Bandar 90+2'	Stadium: Rashid Stadium

== Final ==
3 May 2018	Al Wasl	1–2	Al Ain	Abu Dhabi
	Caio 90+2'		Ismail 3' Berg 50'	Stadium: Zayed Sports City Stadium
