= Alaa Mezher =

Lebanese footballer (born 1992)

Personal information
- Full name: Alaa Mohamad Kheir Mezher
- Date of birth: 19 December 1992 (age 33)
- Place of birth: Dubai, United Arab Emirates
- Height: 1.66 m (5 ft 5 in)
- Position: Winger

Team information
- Current team: Gulf United
- Number: 12

Youth career
- Al-Shaab
- Sharjah
- 2009–2012: Juventus

Senior career*
Years	Team	Apps	(Gls)
2012–2013	Chabab Ghazieh	6	(1)
2015–2016	Salam Zgharta		
2016–2017	Safa		
2017	BTU United		
2017–2018	Shabab Arabi	16	(1)
2018–2019	Dibba Al Fujairah	2	(0)
2019	Hatta	3	(0)
2020–2021	Al Hamriyah	3	(0)
2021–2022	Nejmeh	11	(0)
2022–2023	Gulf FC	23	(2)
2023–2024	Al-Dhaid	0	(0)
2024–2025	Gulf United	12	(2)
2025	Al-Arabi	11	(0)
2025–2026	Al-Ittifaq	23	(5)
2026–	Gulf United	3	(0)
- * Club domestic league appearances and goals as of 15:38, 7 December 2025 (UTC)

Alaa Mohamad Kheir Mezher (Arabic: علاء محمد خير مزهر; born 12 December 1992) is a Lebanese professional footballer who plays as a winger for Emirati club Gulf United.

== Career ==
Born in the United Arab Emirates, Mezher began his youth career at Al-Shaab and Sharjah, before joining the youth sector of Italian club Juventus in 2009.

Mezher moved to Lebanon in 2012, playing for Chabab Ghazieh in the 2012–13 Lebanese Premier League. He scored a goal against Safa, in a 5–1 defeat. Mezher then played for Salam Zgharta in the 2015–16 season, and moved to Safa ahead of the 2016–17 season. He came on as a substitute in Safa's 2–0 defeat to Nejmeh in the Lebanese Super Cup.

In January 2017, Mezher moved to BTU United in the Thai League 4 on a one-year contract. He moved back to the Lebanese Premier League in summer 2017, playing for newly promoted side Shabab Arabi in the 2017–18 season. In summer 2018, Mezher joined Dibba Al Fujairah in the UAE Pro League. He played seven games in all competitions – two in the league.

Mezher then moved to the UAE First Division, playing for Hatta in the second half of the 2018–19 season, and Al Hamriya in the 2020–21 season. On 19 January 2021, Al Hamriyah terminated Mezher's contract by mutual consent. On 7 August 2021, Mezher returned to Lebanon, signing for Nejmeh ahead of the 2021–22 season. He left the club in June 2022, following the end of his contract.

In July 2022, Mezher moved back to the UAE, joining Gulf FC in the UAE First Division. He made 23 league appearances during the 2022–23 season, scoring twice. In July 2023, Mezher joined Al-Dhaid. He made one appearance in the UAE President's Cup, without playing in the league. In August 2024, Mezher joined Gulf United. He scored his first league goal for the club against Al-Arabi on 11 January 2025, although Gulf United lost 3–1. He finished the season with 12 league appearances and two goals.

In January 2025, Mezher joined Al-Arabi on a free transfer from Gulf United, with the club announcing that he would be registered in the category for players born in the UAE. He made 11 league appearances during the remainder of the 2024–25 season, without scoring. In July 2025, Mezher joined Al-Ittifaq. During the 2025–26 season, he made 23 league appearances and scored five goals. Among his goals was the opening goal in Al-Ittifaq's 3–1 victory over Gulf United on 6 February 2026, a match in which Mario Balotelli also scored for Al-Ittifaq.

In August 2026, Mezher returned to Gulf United.

== Personal life ==
Mezher is a Lebanese citizen born in the United Arab Emirates who holds Emirati residence.

== Honours ==
Safa

- Lebanese FA Cup runner-up: 2016–17
- Lebanese Super Cup runner-up: 2016

Nejmeh

- Lebanese FA Cup: 2021–22
- Lebanese Elite Cup: 2021
- Lebanese Super Cup runner-up: 2021
