= Ghanem Ahmad =

Emirati association football player (born 1999)

Personal information
- Full name: Ghanem Ahmad Ghanem Mohammad
- Date of birth: 29 September 1999 (age 27)
- Place of birth: United Arab Emirates
- Height: 1.80 m (5 ft 11 in)
- Position: Winger

Team information
- Current team: Al-Ittifaq
- Number: 60

Youth career
- –2019: Al-Wasl

Senior career*
Years	Team	Apps	(Gls)
2019–2025	Al-Wasl	21	(3)
2023–2024	→ Hatta (loan)	2	(0)
2024–2025	→ Emirates (loan)		
2026–	Al-Ittifaq		
- * Club domestic league appearances and goals as of 13 March 2020

Ghanem Ahmad Ghanem Mohammad (Arabic: غانم أحمد غانم محمد; born 29 September 1999) is an Emirati footballer who plays as a winger for Al-Ittifaq.

== Career ==
Ahmad started his career at Al-Wasl as a product of the club's youth system. On 13 March 2020, he made his professional debut against Hatta in the Pro League, replacing Waleed Al-Hammadi.
