= Alhazen (disambiguation) =

Ibn al-Haytham (Latinized "Alhazen") was an 11th-century Arab mathematician and astronomer.

Alhazen or Alhaitham may also refer to:

- Alhazen (crater), a lunar crater
- 59239 Alhazen, an asteroid
- Alhaitham (Genshin Impact), a character from the 2020 video game Genshin Impact

== See also ==
- Alhazen's problem
- Haitham
