= Ayaan Shabbir Yusuf =

Indian footballer (born 2004)

Personal information
- Full name: Ayaan Yusuf Shabbir Ahmed Yusuf
- Date of birth: 6 November 2004 (age 21)
- Place of birth: Dubai, United Arab Emirates
- Height: 1.75 m (5 ft 9 in)
- Position: Left-back

Team information
- Current team: Gulf United
- Number: 34

Youth career
- Al-Nasr
- 2021–2022: Al Wasl
- 2022–2024: Shabab Al Ahli

Senior career*
Years	Team	Apps	(Gls)
2024–2025	Gulf United		
2025–2026	United		
2026–	Gulf United	6	(0)
- * Club domestic league appearances and goals as of 15 October 2026

Ayaan Yusuf Shabbir Ahmed Yusuf (Arabic: ايان يوسف شبير احمد يوسف; born 6 November 2004) is a professional footballer who plays for Gulf United as a left-back.

== Early and personal life ==
Yusuf was born in Dubai, United Arab Emirates to Indian parents Dilshana Shabbir Ahmed and Shabbir Ahmed Yusuf from Kerala. His father, an amateur footballer in Dubai and the reason Yusuf got into football, died when Yusuf was seventeen.

== Club career ==
Yusuf's father took him to professional club Al-Nasr, where he began his career. He played in the academies of Shabab Al Ahli and Al Wasl, before joining Gulf United, where he made his professional debut in the UAE First Division. He joined United in 2025, and contributed to their run in the 2025–26 edition of the UAE President's Cup, which saw them reach the semi-finals before losing to Al Ain.

== Career statistics ==
=== Club ===
As of 2 November 2026

Appearances and goals by club, season and competition
Club	Season	League			National Cup (Note: Includes UAE President's Cup)		League Cup (Note: Includes UAE League Cup)		Other		Total	
Club	Season	Division	Apps	Goals	Apps	Goals	Apps	Goals	Apps	Goals	Apps	Goals
Gulf United	2024–25	UAE First Division	–		1	0	0	0	0	0	1	0
United	2025–26	UAE First Division	–		2	0	0	0	0	0	2	0
Gulf United	2026–27	UAE First Division	6	0	1	0	0	0	0	0	7	0
Career total			6	0	4	0	0	0	0	0	10	0
