= Mario Balotelli =

Italian footballer (born 1990)

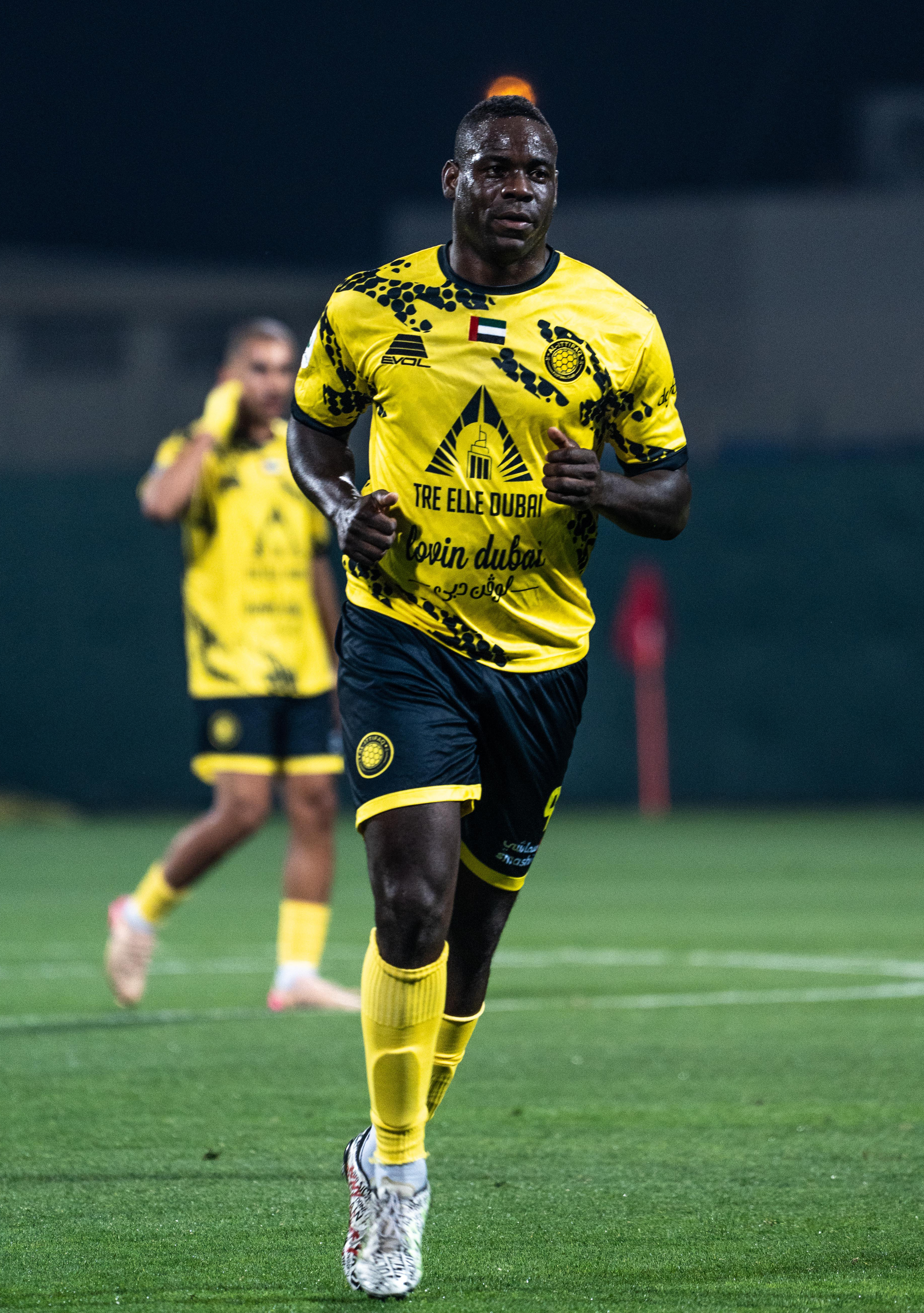
- Balotelli playing for Al-Ittifaq in 2026

Personal information
- Full name: Mario Balotelli Barwuah
- Birth name: Mario Barwuah
- Date of birth: 12 August 1990 (age 36)
- Place of birth: Palermo, Italy
- Height: 1.89 m (6 ft 2 in)
- Position: Striker

Team information
- Current team: Al-Ittifaq
- Number: 9

Youth career
- 2001–2006: Lumezzane
- 2006–2007: Inter Milan

Senior career*
Years	Team	Apps	(Gls)
2006	Lumezzane	2	(0)
2007–2010	Inter Milan	59	(20)
2010–2013	Manchester City	54	(20)
2013–2014	AC Milan	43	(26)
2014–2016	Liverpool	16	(1)
2015–2016	→ AC Milan (loan)	20	(1)
2016–2019	Nice	61	(33)
2019	Marseille	15	(8)
2019–2020	Brescia	19	(5)
2020–2021	Monza	12	(5)
2021–2022	Adana Demirspor	33	(18)
2022–2023	Sion	18	(6)
2023–2024	Adana Demirspor	16	(7)
2024–2025	Genoa	6	(0)
2026–	Al-Ittifaq	12	(6)

International career^{‡}
2008–2010	Italy U21	18	(7)
2010–2018	Italy	36	(14)
Medal record
Men's Football
Representing Italy
UEFA European Championship
Runner-up	2012 Poland–Ukraine
FIFA Confederations Cup
Third place	2013 Brazil
- * Club domestic league appearances and goals as of 15 May 2026 ‡ National team caps and goals as of 7 September 2018

Mario Balotelli Barwuah (Italian pronunciation: [ˈmaːrjo baloˈtɛlli]; né Barwuah; born 12 August 1990) is an Italian professional footballer who plays as a striker for UAE First Division club Al-Ittifaq. Regarded as a highly promising player in his youth, Balotelli is a versatile forward with strength, pace and an eye for goal. He is a penalty kick specialist. While recognised for his ability, Balotelli has attracted criticism throughout his career for his conduct, work rate and disciplinary record.

Balotelli started his professional football career in 2005 at Lumezzane, before joining Inter Milan in 2007. He won the treble (Serie A, Coppa Italia, and Champions League) in 2010. Balotelli reunited with Internazionale manager Roberto Mancini at Manchester City in 2010, helping them win a Premier League title and FA Cup. He moved back to Italy in January 2013, signing for Inter's rival club, AC Milan, before returning to the Premier League with Liverpool 18 months later. Following a return to Milan on loan, Balotelli departed to France, playing for Nice and Marseille in Ligue 1. He returned to Italy a third time, joining Serie A club Brescia in summer 2019, and Serie B club Monza in late 2020. The following summer, Balotelli signed for Turkish club Adana Demirspor.

Balotelli earned his first cap for Italy in a friendly match against the Ivory Coast in 2010. He amassed over 30 caps and represented his country at UEFA Euro 2012, the 2013 FIFA Confederations Cup, and the 2014 FIFA World Cup. He helped the national side reach the final of Euro 2012, scoring twice against Germany in the semi-finals, and won bronze at the Confederations Cup. Balotelli is Italy's joint-top scorer in the UEFA European Championship, and joint-top scorer in the Confederations Cup.

== Early life ==
Balotelli was born Mario Barwuah in Palermo, Sicily, to Ghanaian immigrants. The family moved to Bagnolo Mella in the province of Brescia, Lombardy, when he was two. In 1993, when he was three, he was placed in foster care to the Balotelli family when his own family was unable to pay for his health care needs. His foster parents are Silvia, the Jewish daughter of Holocaust survivors, and Francesco Balotelli. They lived in the town of Concesio, Brescia, in northern Italy.

At first, he stayed with the Balotelli family during the weekdays and returned to his biological parents on weekends. He later was permanently fostered by the Balotellis full-time and adopted their surname. In June 2012, he dedicated his goals that put Italy in the final of the Euro 2012 football championships to his foster mother Silvia. Balotelli had to wait until his 18th birthday to request Italian citizenship, as his foster family had not adopted him. He officially gained citizenship in Concesio on 13 August 2008. After the ceremony he released the following statement:

I am Italian, I feel Italian, I will forever play with the Italian national team.

— Mario Balotelli

Mario has three biological siblings: Abigail, Enoch (who is two years younger than Balotelli and also a professional footballer) and Angel Barwuah.

== Club career ==
=== Lumezzane ===
Balotelli began his career at local side Lumezzane, twenty minutes from the Balotelli residence in Concesio. At age 15, he was promoted to the first team, making his first team debut in a Serie C1 league match against Padova on 2 April 2006.

=== Inter Milan ===
Having had an unsuccessful trial with Barcelona at age 15, Balotelli was signed by Inter Milan in 2006 on loan with a pre-set price of €150,000 to co-own the player. In June 2007, Inter exercised the option and purchased the other half for an additional €190,000. On 8 November 2007, as part of Sheffield F.C.'s 150th anniversary celebrations, Balotelli featured in a friendly between the two sides at Sheffield United's Bramall Lane. The game finished 5–2 to Inter, with Balotelli scoring twice. He made his first team and Serie A debut on 16 December 2007, replacing David Suazo in a 2–0 win against Cagliari. Three days later, he was featured in the starting lineup in a Coppa Italia match against Reggina, scoring two goals in a 4–1 win. Balotelli gained national attention after he scored two goals against Juventus in the return leg of the Coppa Italia quarter-finals, being instrumental in a 3–2 away win for Inter. His first Serie A goal then came in April 2008 in a 2–0 away win against Atalanta. Inter went on to win the 2007–08 Serie A. Balotelli was a substitute in the 2008 Supercoppa Italiana final against Roma, coming on as a replacement for Luís Figo and scoring in the 83rd minute. Inter went on to win the final 6–5 on penalties after the match ended 2–2.

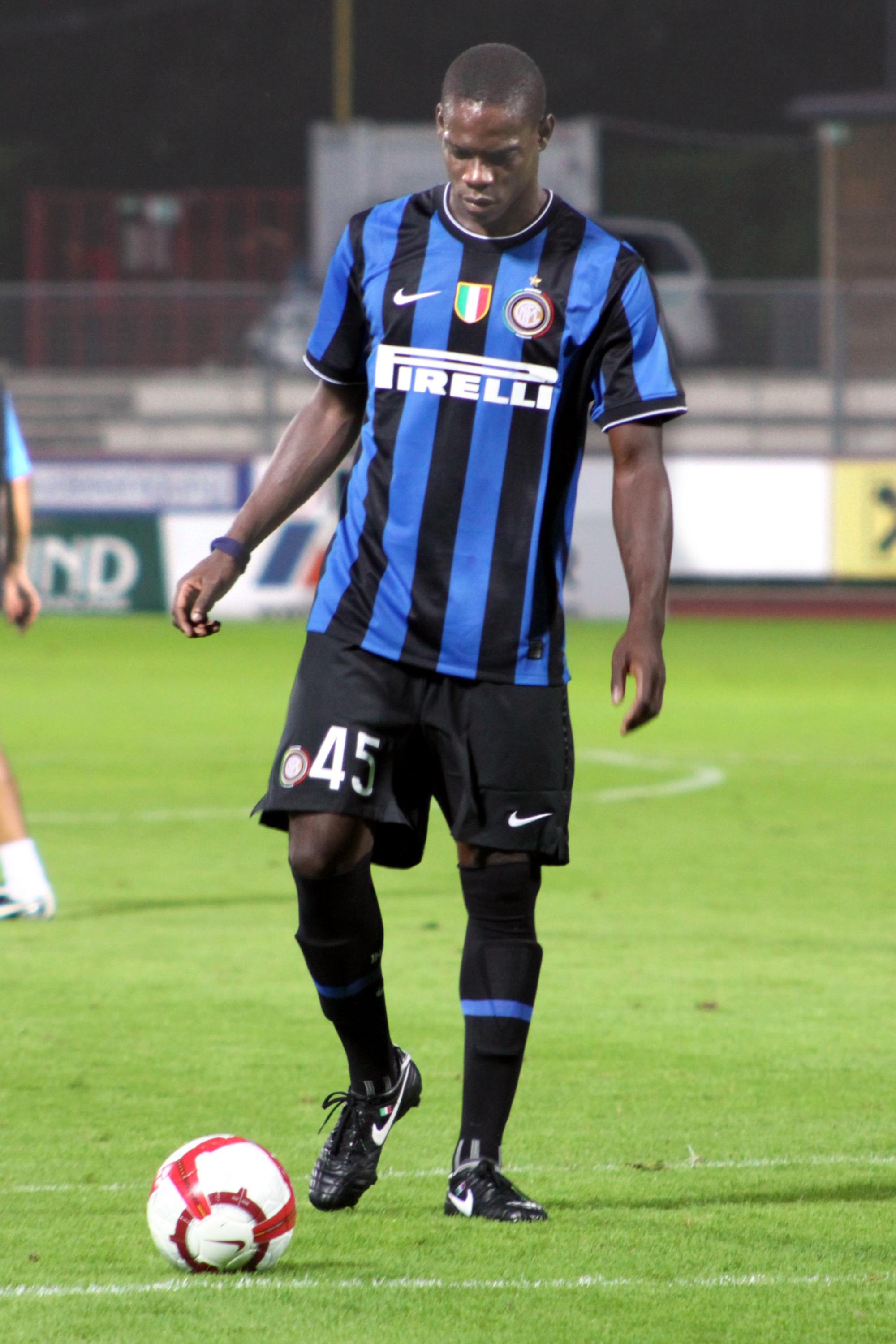
Balotelli playing for Inter Milan in 2009

In November 2008, Balotelli became the youngest Inter player (at 18 years and 85 days) to score in the UEFA Champions League when he scored a goal in a 3–3 draw against Cypriot side Anorthosis Famagusta, beating the previous record set by Obafemi Martins (at 18 years and 145 days). In an April 2009 match with Juventus where he scored Inter's only goal in a 1–1 draw, Balotelli was racially abused by Juventus fans throughout the match. This led Inter owner Massimo Moratti to say he would have pulled the team off the pitch had he been present. The racist chants were also condemned by Juventus chairman Giovanni Cobolli Gigli, and Juventus were issued a one-match home-fan ban because of the incident. Inter won Serie A for the fourth time in a row.

In his second season with Inter, Balotelli had several disciplinary problems, most notably involving head coach José Mourinho, who excluded him from the first team in the second half of January 2009. Earlier that season, Mourinho had accused Balotelli of showing a lack of effort in training, saying, "[A]s far as I'm concerned, a young boy like him cannot allow himself to train less than people like Figo, Córdoba, and Zanetti." Balotelli continued to be the subject of racist chants throughout the season, becoming the focus of Juventus fans even during matches not involving Inter, leading to Juventus being fined twice and the club ultimately punished with a partial stadium closure.

Balotelli's disciplinary problems and his difficult relationship with Mourinho continued in the 2009–10 season. In November 2009, Inter drew 1–1 against Roma, after which Mourinho criticized his players, going as far as saying Balotelli "came close to a zero rating". Balotelli had another negative encounter with Juventus fans in the heated Derby d'Italia encounter in an away match against Juventus on 5 December 2009, which Inter lost 2–1. When he was elbowed by Juventus midfielder Felipe Melo in the shoulder, Balotelli fell theatrically onto the pitch, for which he was booked, while Melo was sent off for a second yellow card. The incident sparked an altercation between Balotelli's teammate Thiago Motta and Juventus goalkeeper Gianluigi Buffon. The tension between Balotelli and Mourinho reached its peak on the eve of the UEFA Champions League second leg against Chelsea after the young striker was not called-up, following an altercation with his manager. Despite Inter's 1–0 win at Stamford Bridge, Balotelli was criticized by several senior players, including captain Javier Zanetti and veteran defender Marco Materazzi, as well as by his own agent. In March 2010, he came under heavy criticism from fans after he publicly sported an AC Milan shirt on the Italian show Striscia la Notizia.

Balotelli released a statement of apology in Inter's official website that read:

I am sorry for the situation that has been created recently. I am the first person who has suffered because I adore football and I want to play, and now I am waiting in silence so I can return to being useful to my team. I want to put the past behind me, look to the future and concentrate on the upcoming commitments and make myself ready.

— Mario Balotelli

After a falling-out with Mourinho, Balotelli was recalled for Inter's April 2010 match against Bologna, and he marked his return with a goal in their 3–0 win. He again caused controversy in the Champions League semi-final against Barcelona on 20 April 2010 when he threw his shirt on the ground after the final whistle in response to Inter fans who had booed him for his poor performance. He admitted three years later the incident was the only regret in his life. Disgruntled fans confronted and tried to attack Balotelli after the match. His behavior on the pitch brought disapproval from his teammates, with Javier Zanetti publicly saying, "Mario needs to focus on doing what he can do on the pitch, he can't allow himself to behave like this." Amid these controversies with his club and manager, many English Premier League teams, including Manchester United and Manchester City, indicated they were interested in signing Balotelli in July 2010.

=== Manchester City ===
==== 2010–11 ====
After weeks of speculation, Inter reached an agreement for Balotelli's transfer to Manchester City on 12 August 2010 for a €21.8 million fee. At Manchester City, Balotelli reunited with his former head coach at Inter, Roberto Mancini, who said, "His style of play will suit the Premier League, and because he is still so young there is a big chance for him to improve. He is a strong and exciting player, and City fans will enjoy watching him." Balotelli exchanged squad numbers with teammate Greg Cunningham so he could continue to wear the number 45 shirt.

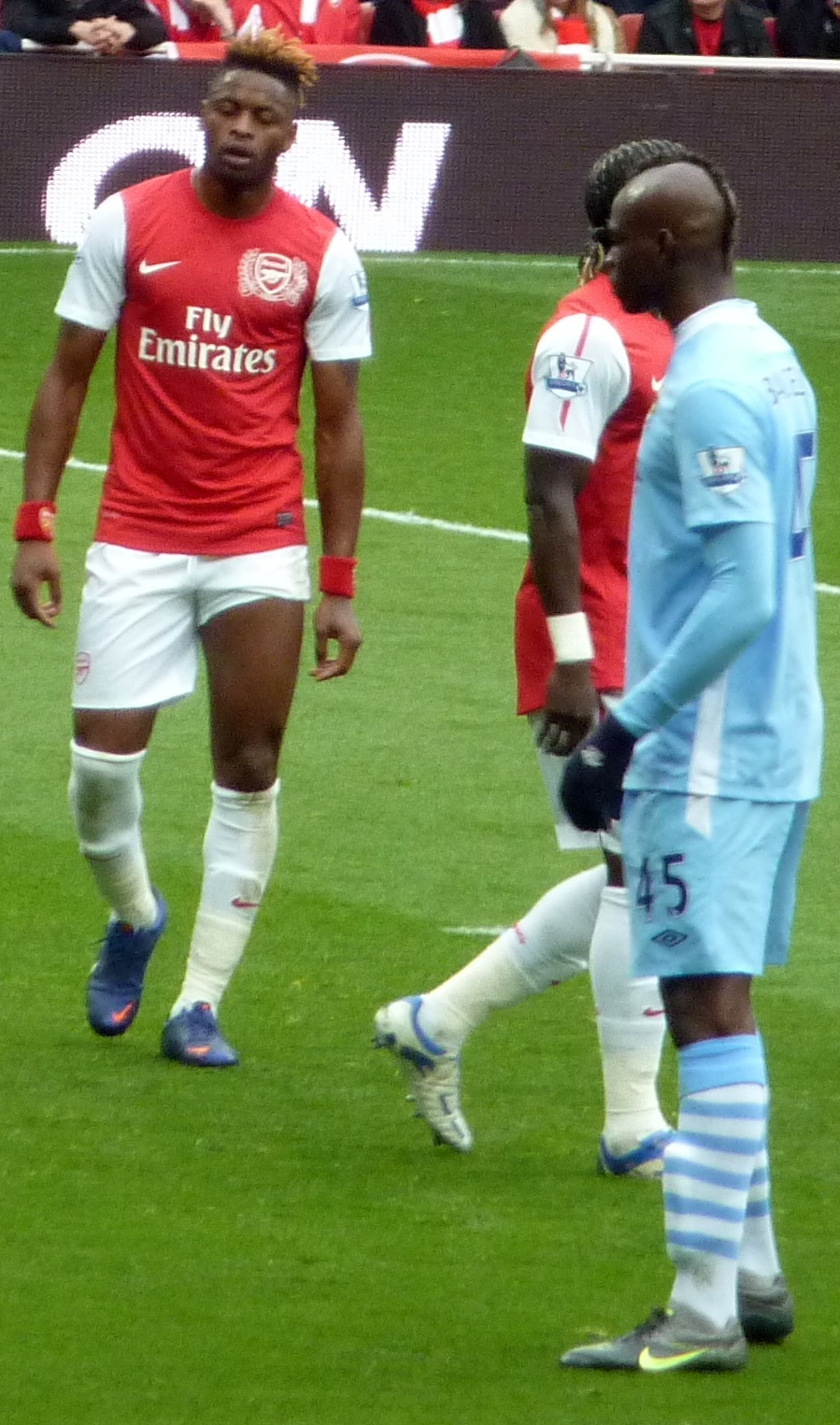
Balotelli (right) with Alex Song and Bacary Sagna in April 2012

On 19 August 2010, Balotelli came on as a substitute to score in his debut against Romanian side Politehnica Timișoara in a 1–0 away win in the UEFA Europa League, but during the match, injured the lateral meniscus in his right knee and on 8 September, underwent surgery that sidelined him until October. Balotelli eventually made his Premier League debut on 24 October as a substitute in a 3–0 home defeat to Arsenal, then made his first Premier League start on 30 October in a 2–1 away defeat to Wolverhampton Wanderers. Balotelli scored his first and second Premier League goals on 7 November in a 2–0 away win to West Bromwich Albion. In the same game Balotelli received a red card for violent conduct as the result of a clash with Youssuf Mulumbu, which his manager Roberto Mancini described as unfair. Balotelli scored the first two of City's three goals in the 3–0 win over Red Bull Salzburg in Manchester City's Europa League group stage match.

On 21 December 2010, Balotelli won the Golden Boy Award, saying only one of the past winners was slightly better than he was: Lionel Messi. He also claimed not to know of Arsenal's Jack Wilshere, the player he narrowly beat to the award. On 28 December, Balotelli scored his first Premier League hat-trick in a 4–0 win over Aston Villa. Despite this success, Balotelli still had disciplinary problems, and in March 2011, he was sent off in the second leg of Manchester City's Europa League draw with Dynamo Kyiv. On 14 May, Balotelli was named man of the match in the 2011 FA Cup Final as Manchester City defeated Stoke City 1–0 to win their first trophy in 35 years.

==== 2011–12 ====
The problem is because of his age, he can make some mistakes. He's Mario. He's crazy – but I love him because he's a good guy.

— Roberto Mancini, Balotelli's manager at Inter Milan and Manchester City in October 2011

Balotelli scored his first goal of the 2011–12 campaign in a 2–0 League Cup win against Birmingham City. He followed this up with the opening goal against Everton three days later. On 1 October 2011, he scored his third goal in as many matches in a 4–0 win away to Blackburn Rovers. Balotelli scored the opening two goals and forced the dismissal of Jonny Evans as City defeated Manchester United 6–1 at Old Trafford on 23 October in what would prove to be a decisive game in helping win Manchester City the Premier League title. Balotelli made his UEFA Champions League debut for City on 2 November in the second leg against Villarreal. He scored on a penalty shot near the end of the first half, his first Champions League goal for City and his seventh goal overall in the season. On 27 November, Balotelli came on as a 65th-minute substitute against Liverpool and was sent off after receiving two yellow cards. Balotelli scored using his right shoulder in City's 5–1 win over Norwich City on 3 December. He put City 1–0 up against Chelsea at Stamford Bridge after just two minutes on 12 December, although Chelsea rallied to win 2–1.

On 22 January 2012, Balotelli came on as a substitute during a match against Tottenham Hotspur. He appeared to stamp on Scott Parker during the match against Tottenham, but, already booked, did not receive a second yellow from referee Howard Webb, who did not see the incident. Balotelli subsequently scored his first goal of 2012, an injury-time penalty which secured a 3–2 win for City. He was charged for violent conduct for the kick against Scott Parker and was suspended for four matches, three for violent conduct and one for his second sending off. On 25 February, Balotelli scored his tenth league goal of the season in a 3–0 home win against Blackburn. He scored again the following game in a 2–0 win against Bolton Wanderers. On 31 March, Balotelli scored twice as City drew 3–3 at home against Sunderland. However, Balotelli was criticized for his actions in the match after squabbling with Aleksandar Kolarov over a free kick. Roberto Mancini claimed after the match he had considered substituting Balotelli just five minutes into the match. On 8 April 2012, Balotelli received his fourth red card of the season after receiving his second yellow card during the match for a tackle against Bacary Sagna during City's 1–0 loss to Arsenal in April 2012. Balotelli was banned for three matches (one for the two yellow cards and two for the previous two red cards in the same season). After the Arsenal match, Mancini appeared to have finally lost his patience with Balotelli, suggesting Balotelli would not play any part in the remainder of City's season and be sold by the club. Despite this, Balotelli did make an appearance as a late substitute in the last match of the season, a final day decider against Queens Park Rangers. Balotelli provided the assist to striker Sergio Agüero, who scored in the 94th minute to give City their first league title since 1968.

==== 2012–13 ====
In December 2012, Balotelli decided to fight against Manchester City's decision to fine him two weeks' wages for his poor disciplinary record the previous season by taking his club to a Premier League tribunal. Balotelli missed 11 matches domestically and in Europe last season because of suspensions. With less than a day remaining to the start of the hearing, Balotelli dropped his tribunal action and accepted the fine.

=== AC Milan ===
==== 2012–13 ====
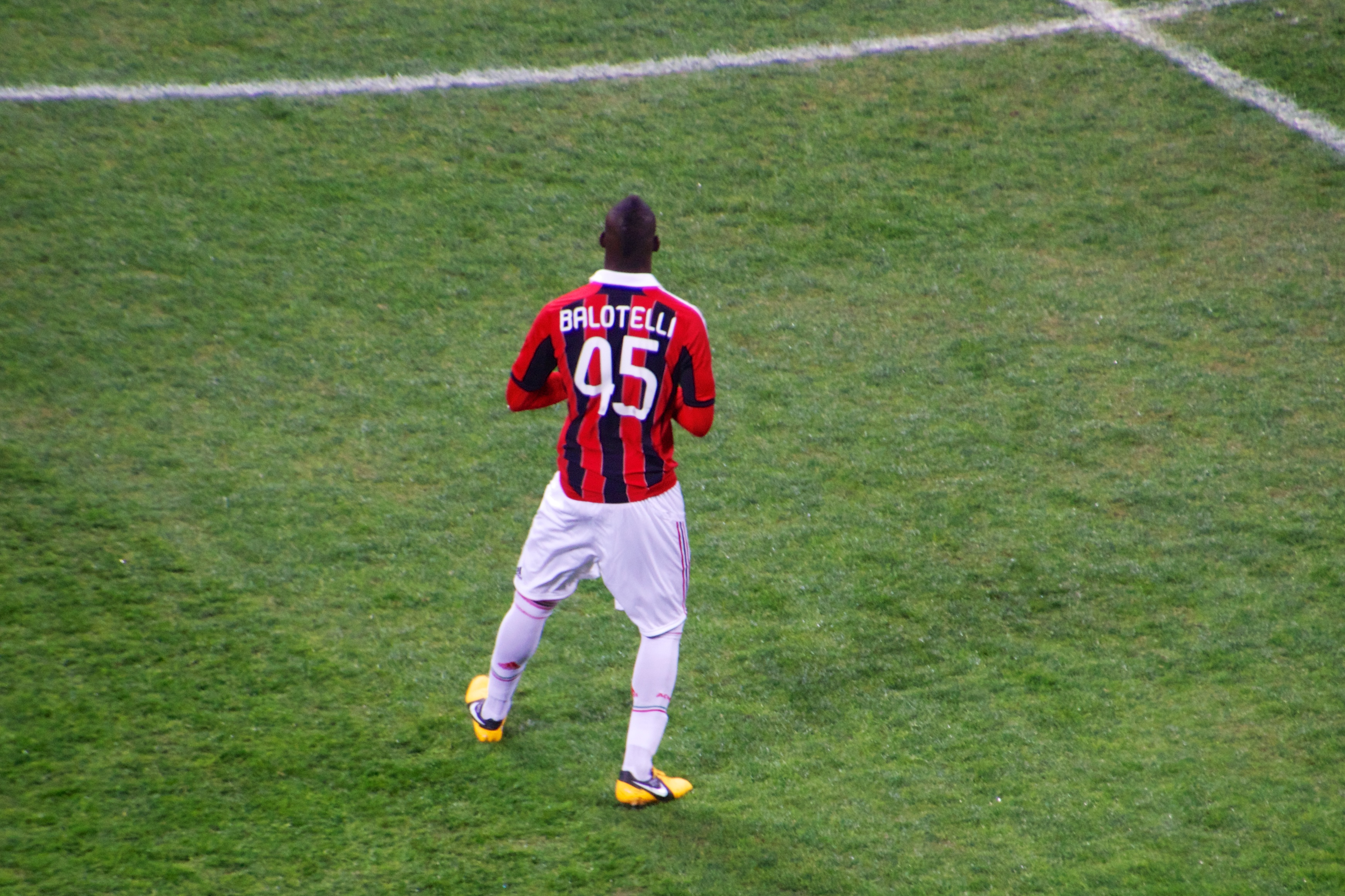
Balotelli playing for AC Milan in 2013

I will remember my brilliant team-mates, the manager and all the supporters. They are the best, they were great with me and I will always have a very special place in my heart for City, it's a great club with a great future.
I spoke with Roberto before I went to speak to the players. We spoke for some time about lots of things. He was sad, and I was too. But it was a good conversation. I love Roberto, he has been very important for my career, and I will always thank him for having trust and faith in me.

— Mario Balotelli on his transfer to AC Milan

On 29 January 2013, AC Milan's organising director Umberto Gandini announced the club had agreed to sign Balotelli from Manchester City on a four-and-a-half-year deal rumoured to be worth €20 million plus bonuses and add-ons. Manchester City's then manager Roberto Mancini suggested he had sanctioned Balotelli's sale to Milan for the good of the player, describing the forward as "like another one of my children" and saying Balotelli could become one of the best players in the world when restored to Serie A. On 31 January 2013, the Serie A giants completed the signing, and Balotelli was awarded the number 45 shirt, the same number he wore for Inter Milan and Manchester City. Milan vice-president Adriano Galliani said, "Balotelli in Rossoneri is a dream that has been realized. It is a transfer that everyone wanted: club, president and fans." Balotelli received a warm reception when he returned to Milan. His arrival saw some fans scuffling with police and one policeman was taken to hospital with head injuries. It was said Silvio Berlusconi's signing of Balotelli would help him gain extra votes in the 2013 Italian general election.

On 3 February 2013, Balotelli made his debut for Milan and scored two goals, including a last minute penalty, to earn a 2–1 victory over Udinese. The win lifted Milan to fourth in the table, ahead of Inter Milan on goal difference. In the next two matches, Balotelli scored two goals, including 30 yards (27 m) free-kick against Parma. With that goal, he equaled Oliver Bierhoff's record of four goals in first three matches for Milan. In his fifth appearance, Balotelli appeared as a substitute against Genoa and scored his fifth goal for his new club. In the match against Palermo, Balotelli continued his impressive scoring streak with two more goals, one from a penalty and another from an M'Baye Niang cross. Balotelli then scored four goals in three consecutive matches: one against Catania, one against Torino and two against Pescara. On 12 May 2013, Balotelli was subjected to racist chants by some of the Roma fans, which prompted the match to be suspended for several minutes by referee Gianluca Rocchi, in an eventual 0–0 away draw. He ended his first season with Milan with 12 goals in 13 appearances as Milan finished third in Serie A. On the final day of the season, Balotelli scored his 12th goal in 13 matches for Milan as the team defeated Siena to qualify for the 2013–14 UEFA Champions League.

==== 2013–14 ====
On 22 September 2013, Balotelli missed a penalty in a competitive match for the first time in 22 attempts as a professional. Pepe Reina stopped the attempt as Milan lost 2–1 to Napoli. During a match against Catania on 1 December, Balotelli accused opponent Nicolás Spolli of racially abusing him, but there was insufficient evidence for any action to be taken. The following week, Balotelli scored two goals in a 2–2 draw with Livorno, including a sensational 30-yard direct free kick that was clocked at a speed of 109 km/h.

=== Liverpool ===
==== 2014–15 ====
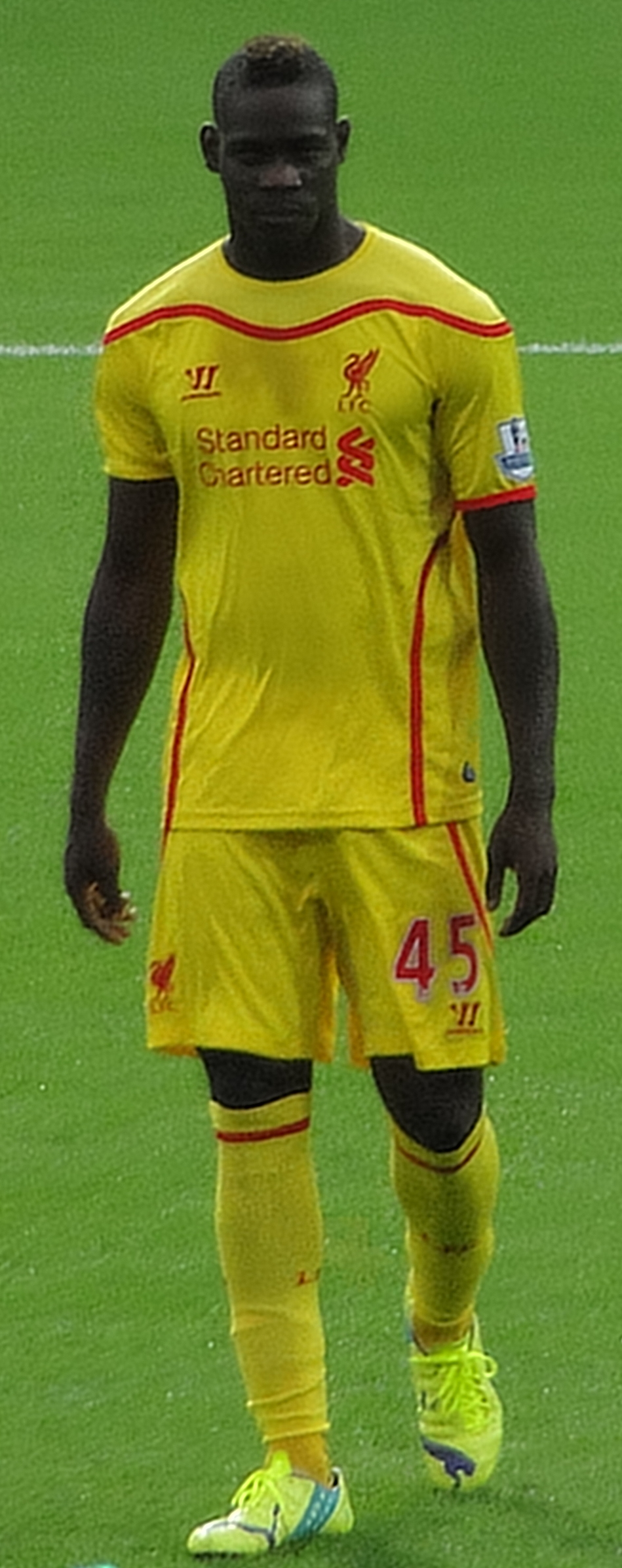
Balotelli playing for Liverpool in September 2014

In August 2014, Balotelli joined Liverpool for a £16 million transfer fee to replace the outgoing Luis Suárez. He made his Liverpool debut in a league game away to Tottenham Hotspur on 31 August, a game Liverpool won 3–0. Balotelli scored his first Liverpool goal on 16 September, opening a 2–1 Anfield victory against Ludogorets Razgrad in the group stage of the 2014–15 UEFA Champions League. In a match in the same competition on 22 October against Real Madrid, Balotelli was criticised by manager Brendan Rodgers for swapping shirts with opponent Pepe at half time, saying, "It's something that doesn't happen here and shouldn't happen here."

On 18 December 2014, Balotelli was suspended for one match and fined £25,000 for posting an image on social media which appeared to contain antisemitic and racist references. Balotelli's first Premier League goal for Liverpool came on his 13th appearance, on 10 February 2015, an 83rd-minute winner in a 3–2 victory over Tottenham Hotspur at Anfield, nine minutes after replacing Daniel Sturridge. He scored just 4 goals in 28 appearances and at season's end and was adjudged by many to be among the worst signings of the season.

==== Return to AC Milan on loan ====
On 27 August 2015, Balotelli returned to Milan on season-long loan deal. On 22 September, he scored his first goal after returning to Milan on his third appearance to open the scoring in the fifth minute from a free kick at 25 yards out against Udinese in a 3–2 away win. However, a week later, he suffered a groin injury in a 1–0 defeat to Genoa on 27 September, requiring surgery and ruling him out for three months. He returned to action, coming on as a substitute on 17 January 2016 in a 2–0 home win over Fiorentina, before scoring the lone goal from the penalty spot nine days later during the first semi final leg of the Coppa Italia against Alessandria as he helped Milan reach the final of the tournament. On 1 May, he had his penalty saved in a 3–3 home draw against Frosinone, for which he was mocked by opponent Mirko Gori. Balotelli finished the season with only 1 goal in 20 league appearances as Milan finished the season in seventh place, once again failing to qualify for Europe following their 1–0 defeat to Juventus in the 2016 Coppa Italia Final. Balotelli returned to Liverpool in the middle of 2016, but with no future under new manager Jürgen Klopp, who chose not to include him on Liverpool's pre-season tour to the United States or any of the club's other friendlies.

=== Nice ===
==== 2016–17 ====
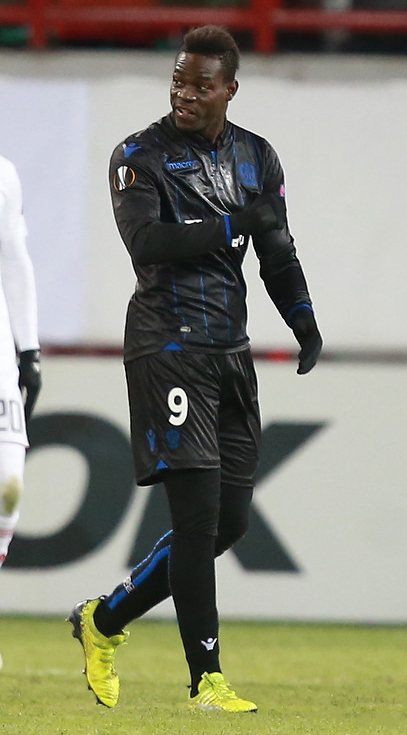
Balotelli playing for Nice in February 2018

On 31 August 2016, the deadline day for the summer transfer window, it was announced Balotelli had joined Nice of the French Ligue 1 on a free transfer, signing a one-year deal. In an interview leading up to his Nice debut on 11 September, Balotelli told Canal Plus that joining Liverpool in the summer of 2014 was the "worst mistake of his life" and that Brendan Rodgers and Jürgen Klopp (the two Liverpool managers during Balotelli's time at the club) did not make a good impression on him and he did not get along with them. He made his debut for Nice, starting in a home Ligue 1 match against Marseille, converting a penalty in the 7th minute and scoring a header from Ricardo's cross in the 78th minute as Nice won the match 3–2. On 21 September, Balotelli, in only his second Ligue 1 appearance, struck another double in the 30th and 68th minutes as Nice thrashed Monaco 4–0 in the Azurean derby at the Allianz Riviera to go to the top of Ligue 1. No other player had scored four goals in their first two Ligue 1 matches in the last 25 years.

On 29 September, Balotelli scored his fifth goal in just four competitive matches for Nice when he fired home a right-footed shot from just outside the penalty area in the 43rd minute after an assist from Malang Sarr in a 2016–17 UEFA Europa League Group I match against Krasnodar in an eventual 5–2 away defeat. That was his first goal in a UEFA club competition since February 2015, when he scored for Liverpool against Beşiktaş in the round of 32 of the 2014–15 UEFA Europa League knockout phase. On 2 October, Balotelli scored the winning goal in the 86th minute by sending a powerful kick from the edge of the box into the top right corner as Nice defeated Lorient 2–1 in a home Ligue 1 match, during which he received a yellow card for taking off his shirt in celebration of his goal and was subsequently sent off minutes later in stoppage time after receiving a second, controversial yellow card following an altercation with Lorient's Steven Moreira, where neither player appeared to do anything wrong. Balotelli's red card was rescinded four days later after referee Olivier Thual's admission he had made a mistake in showing Balotelli the second yellow card and the French Football League's Disciplinary Commission decided to annul his second yellow card, thus allowing him to be available for the following league match. On 21 December, he received his first official red card in a Nice shirt in a 0–0 Ligue 1 away draw with Bordeaux for kicking Igor Lewczuk.

On 20 January 2017, after the 1–1 Ligue 1 away draw against Bastia, Balotelli claimed on Instagram he was a victim of racist abuse when fans of the Corsican club allegedly made monkey noises directed at him during the match and just prior to the start of the match. On the following day, Alassane Pléa (Balotelli's Nice teammate) confirmed he had heard the monkey noises directed at Balotelli. The Ligue de Football Professionnel (LFP) announced an investigation into Balotelli's allegations. On 18 February 2017, Balotelli was sent off once again, this time in his 14th Ligue 1 appearance, a 1–0 win at Lorient. He received the straight red card in the second half for insulting referee Tony Chapron in English. He was given a two-match ban (the second match was a suspended ban that would be triggered in the event of any further misconduct by Balotelli) by the Ligue 1's disciplinary committee on 23 February. On the same day, the Ligue 1's disciplinary committee ordered Bastia to close part of their stadium for three matches and imposed a suspended one-point deduction on them for "the behaviour of the supporters of SC Bastia – shouts with racist connotations towards Balotelli, use of pyrotechnic devices and intrusion of supporters at the edge of the field". On 10 March 2017, Balotelli reached ten Ligue 1 goals for the season, scoring in a 2–2 draw with Caen.

==== 2017–18 ====
On 25 June 2017, Balotelli signed a one-year contract extension with Nice. On 26 July, he played his first match of the season in Nice's UEFA Champions League qualifying round first leg, in which he scored in their 1–1 draw against Ajax. Balotelli finished the season with a career-high 18 league goals and a further 8 goals across all other competitions. His strong form earned him a recall to the Italy national team for the first time since the 2014 FIFA World Cup four years prior.

==== 2018–19 ====
When it comes to Mario, I want to answer back, or just slam him up against the wall or leave him hanging by his collar on the coat rack, but I can't, as I'm no longer a player.

— Patrick Vieira, Balotelli's manager at Nice in December 2018

On 20 August 2018, Balotelli re-signed with Nice on a third consecutive one-year contract after a move to rivals Marseille fell through earlier in the summer. In spite of penning a new deal with the Cote d'Azur club, Balotelli appeared late and out-of-shape for pre-season training, and did not play the first three league matches due to a court suspension. His struggling form at the start of the season, as well as his growing conflict with the new coach Patrick Vieira, saw Balotelli left out of the first-team squad after making only 10 league appearances. Vieira later announced that Balotelli would not be renewing his contract with Nice and that he would likely leave during the January transfer window.

=== Marseille ===
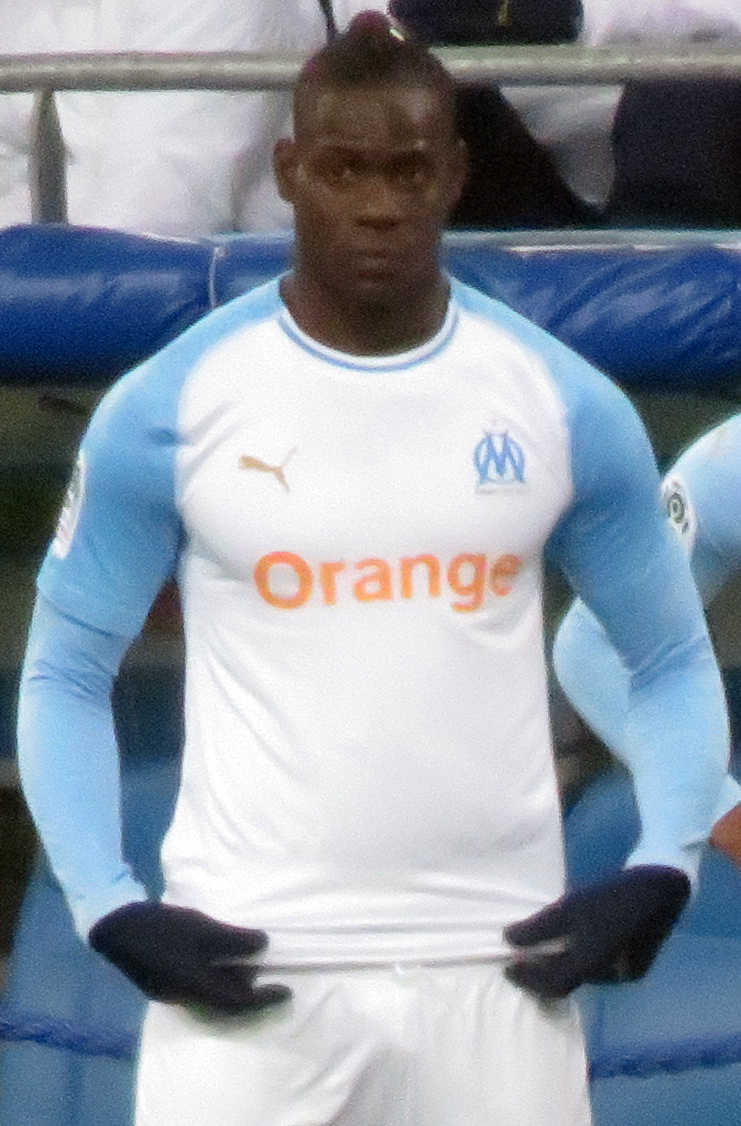
Balotelli with Marseille in 2019

On 23 January 2019, Balotelli terminated his contract with Nice and signed a contract until the end of the season with Marseille. On 25 January, he made his debut for the club coming on as a substitute in the 74th minute at home to Lille, later also scoring his first goal in the last minute of stoppage time of an ultimate 2–1 loss. He scored his fourth league goal on 3 March, an acrobatic volley in a 2–0 home win against Saint-Étienne. He celebrated the goal by creating an Instagram story on the pitch from his cell phone. On 30 March, he became the first player since Josip Skoblar in the late 1960s to score in each of his first five home games for Marseille in Ligue 1.

=== Brescia ===
On 18 August 2019, Balotelli signed a "multi-year contract" with his hometown club Brescia on a free transfer. He signed for a base salary of €1.5 million before bonuses for one year, with an automatic renewal if the club avoids relegation. On 24 September 2019, Balotelli made his debut for the club in a 2–1 home league defeat against Juventus. He was unable to play prior to this due to a four-match suspension he received while at Marseille for a rash challenge against Montpellier. On 29 September, he scored his first goal for the club in a 2–1 away loss to Napoli. On 3 November 2019, Balotelli was subjected to racist chants by some of the Hellas Verona fans, prompting him to pick up the ball in the 54th minute and kick it into the crowd. He started to walk off as the match was suspended for several minutes, but he was persuaded by players of both sides to stay on the pitch. He went on to score in the 85th minute of the 2–1 away loss.

Balotelli scored Brescia's lone goal in a 1–2 defeat against Lazio on 5 January 2020. During the match, he was once again the subject of racist taunts from the opponent's fan base and afterwards Balotelli took to social media to condemn the attacks. The Serie A found Lazio supporters guilty of racial abuse but only fined the club €20,000 and they avoided more serious punishment by not having a stadium ban imposed on them. Brescia was relegated to Serie B at the end of the 2019–20 Serie A season, thus the automatic renewal option of his contract was not activated, and the contract was ultimately terminated after Balotelli repeatedly missed training in June and July 2020. In November 2020, Balotelli trained with Serie D side Franciacorta while being a free agent.

=== Monza ===
On 7 December 2020, Balotelli moved to Serie B side Monza on a seven-month contract, reuniting with former Milan teammate Kevin-Prince Boateng, head coach Cristian Brocchi, club owner Silvio Berlusconi, and chairman Adriano Galliani. Balotelli made his debut on 30 December, starting in a 3–0 win over league leaders Salernitana and scoring on his first touch in the 4th minute. On 1 May 2021, after being on the sidelines for almost a month, Balotelli scored a brace against Salernitana. He came on in the 80th minute and scored on his first touch of the game after less than one minute, and doubled his tally in the first minute of added time.

=== Adana Demirspor ===
On 7 July 2021, Balotelli joined newly promoted Süper Lig club Adana Demirspor. He scored 18 goals in the 2021–22 Süper Lig season, five of which were on the final matchday, in a 7–0 win over Göztepe; his fourth goal in the match, which combined step overs and a rabona shot, earned him a nomination for the 2022 FIFA Puskás Award.

=== Sion ===
On 31 August 2022, Balotelli signed a two-year contract for Swiss Super League club Sion. On 14 September 2023, he left after his contract was terminated.

=== Return to Adana Demirspor ===
On 15 September 2023, Balotelli returned to Adana Demirspor, signing a one-year contract with an option for a further year. His debut and first goals of the new season on 1 October 2023, was in the Alanyaspor match, in which he made his first appearance.

=== Genoa ===
On 28 October 2024, Balotelli signed on a deal until the end of the season for Serie A club Genoa. He made his debut for the club in the 1–0 victory over Parma on 4 November.

=== Al-Ittifaq ===
On 7 January 2026, Balotelli agreed to sign a two-and-a-half-year contract with Emirati club Al-Ittifaq. He scored his first goal in the second match for the new club on 7 February, in a 3–1 win against Gulf United in the UAE First Division League.

== International career ==
=== Youth career ===
Balotelli was unable to answer call-ups to the Italian national under-15 and under-17 teams as he was still considered to be a Ghanaian immigrant. On 7 August 2007, five days before his 17th birthday, Balotelli received his first senior international call-up for Ghana from their coach Claude Le Roy for a friendly against Senegal at the New Den stadium in London, England, on 21 August 2007. He declined the offer, citing once again his willingness to play for Italy when he became eligible. He also expressed his willingness to represent Italy at international level once he acquired an Italian passport. Italy under-21 head coach Pierluigi Casiraghi announced his intention to call-up Balotelli once he obtained Italian citizenship. On 13 August 2008, Balotelli was finally issued Italian citizenship.

This is even more exciting than making my debut in Serie A. The best birthday present I could receive now would be a call to join the Italy squad, although I'd be happy to play for the Under 21 team.

— Mario Balotelli

Casiraghi called him to join the Italy national under-21 football team Azzurrini on 29 August for the matches against Greece and Croatia. In his debut on 5 September 2008, he scored his first international goal in a 1–1 draw with Greece. Balotelli was named in the final 23-man squad for the 2009 UEFA European Under-21 Championships and scored the opening goal against the hosts Sweden in the 23rd minute. Barely 15 minutes later, he was shown a red card for retaliating against Swedish midfielder Pontus Wernbloom. Italy were eliminated by eventual champions Germany in the semi-finals following a 1–0 defeat.

=== Early senior career ===
Despite calls from pundits and fans for Balotelli's inclusion in Italy's 2010 FIFA World Cup squad, manager Marcello Lippi did not call him up, believing that he was not yet ready to play for Italy and that he needed to mature. On 10 August 2010, Balotelli made his first appearance for the Italy senior team, as part of the squad announced by new head coach Cesare Prandelli, in a friendly match against the Ivory Coast, Italy's first match after the 2010 World Cup. In that match he started alongside debutant Amauri and striker Antonio Cassano in a 1–0 loss. On 11 November 2011, Balotelli scored his first senior international goal in a 2–0 win against Poland at Stadion Miejski in Wrocław, Poland, also setting up Italy's second goal of the match.

=== UEFA Euro 2012 ===
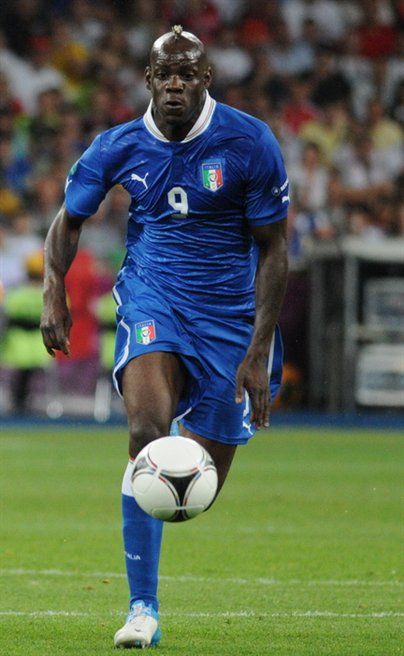
Balotelli playing for Italy in 2012

Before the tournament in Poland and Ukraine, Balotelli was interviewed by a newspaper about racism amongst fans in the host countries. During the interview, Balotelli reiterated his threat to walk off the pitch if any of the opposition fans racially abused him in any way, and said that he would "kill" anyone that threw a banana at him. He spoke about his increasing fears that black players would be targeted by racists and that he refused to accept racism in any form, talking of his past experience of racism in football, notably during his time playing in Serie A for Inter Milan. During the build-up to the competition, Manchester City manager Roberto Mancini had repeatedly defended Balotelli, but he and footballer Daniele De Rossi believed Balotelli would need to grow up and mature if he was going to become the centrepiece of future Italian success.

On 10 June 2012, Balotelli also became the first black player to appear for Italy in a major tournament (UEFA European Championship or FIFA World Cup) in a 1–1 draw against Spain, Italy's first match of UEFA Euro 2012. Italy and Spain later played each other for the second time in the tournament in Kyiv. During the 1–1 draw, Balotelli failed to make an impact and he was substituted off during the 56th minute after missing multiple chances, including a one-on-one with Spanish goalkeeper Iker Casillas just minutes before being substituted off. His replacement was Antonio Di Natale, who managed to secure his 11th international goal and put Italy ahead within his time on the pitch. With Balotelli continuing his run of poor form for Italy, fans and critics began calling for Di Natale to replace the "immature and unpredictable striker".

Later in the tournament, on 18 June 2012, Mario Balotelli scored his first goal in a major international tournament in a 2–0 victory against the Republic of Ireland. When he attempted to celebrate this goal, he was immediately halted by teammate Leonardo Bonucci, who covered Balotelli's mouth with his hand for fear that the striker would say something to "get in trouble". Balotelli had been dropped to the bench by Cesare Prandelli prior to the match due to his lack of ability shown in his previous group matches, so when he was substituted on against Ireland, fans did not expect him to have much of an impact and his celebration of his goal may have originally been directed towards the naysayers who believe he is bad for the team. Balotelli went on to start against England in the quarter-finals. His performance was described as "wasteful", but his effort was rated highly in a match where he missed multiple chances. He scored the first penalty taken in the shootout against his Manchester City teammate Joe Hart. On 28 June, Balotelli scored twice within the first 40 minutes in Italy's semi-final clash with Germany, as the Azzurri won 2–1 and progressed to the Euro 2012 final against European and world champions Spain. After scoring the second goal in that semi-final, he ripped off his shirt and stood motionless as he flexed his muscles, developing a famous celebration. Going into the final, Balotelli said Manchester City's title success meant failure in the Euro would not signal a personal failure this season. He also said he was unfazed by the pressure he supposedly had on his shoulders entering the final, with new high expectations of him from his home supporters after his amazing performance against Germany.

During the tournament, Balotelli was subject to a case of racial abuse during the game against Croatia, which led UEFA to fine the Croatian Football Federation €80,000. Italy were defeated 4–0 in the final by Spain. Despite the heavy defeat, Balotelli was named as part of the Euro 2012 Team of the Tournament due to his performances. With three goals, Balotelli finished the tournament as the joint top scorer along with five other players, although the Golden Boot ultimately went to Fernando Torres because of his assist in the Euro 2012 final.

=== 2014 FIFA World Cup qualifying ===
After establishing himself in the side at Euro 2012, Balotelli remained the first choice striker for Italy's 2014 FIFA World Cup qualifying campaign. On 21 March 2013, Balotelli scored a long-range equaliser in a friendly match against Brazil at the Stade de Genève. Five days later, he scored both goals as Italy defeated Malta in a World Cup qualifier, continuing his prolific scoring streak for both club and country since signing for Milan. On 7 June 2013, Balotelli was sent-off in a 0–0 draw with the Czech Republic in Prague. On 10 September 2013, Balotelli scored the winning goal in a World Cup qualifying match against the Czech Republic in Turin which allowed Italy to clinch the first place spot in their qualifying group and ultimately achieve their objective of qualifying for the 2014 World Cup. Balotelli finished the 2014 World Cup qualifying campaign as Italy's top scorer with five goals. He was also the top scorer of his qualifying group, helping Italy to win their group undefeated.

=== 2013 FIFA Confederations Cup ===
On 3 June 2013, Balotelli was named in Italy's squad for the 2013 FIFA Confederations Cup. In Italy's opening match on 16 June, Balotelli scored a late-winner, helping Italy to beat Mexico 2–1. In Italy's next group match with Japan, Balotelli scored a penalty to make it 3–2 after being 2–0 down in the first half. This was also his tenth goal for Italy, making him the second-youngest player after Giuseppe Meazza to achieve this tally. Italy went on to win the match 4–3, which allowed them to participate in the semi-finals of the Confederations Cup for the first time in their history. In Italy's final group match against hosts and eventual champions Brazil, Balotelli set up Emanuele Giaccherini's equaliser with a back-heel, although Italy eventually lost 4–2. Prior to the semi-final, Balotelli suffered a thigh injury that prevented him from playing in the remainder of the tournament. Italy finished the tournament in third place after defeating Uruguay in a play-off.

=== 2014 FIFA World Cup ===
On 1 June 2014, Balotelli was selected in Italy's squad for the 2014 World Cup. In Italy's opening match of the tournament, he scored the team's winning goal in a 2–1 victory over England on 14 June. After the match, Balotelli said playing in the World Cup for the first time was "a wonderful sensation to experience" and dedicated the goal to his "future wife" Fanny Neguesha, whom he ultimately did not marry. Italy lost their next two matches to Costa Rica and Uruguay and were eliminated in the first round, finishing third in their group. Cesare Prandelli subsequently resigned as Italy manager.

=== 2014–present: post-World Cup ===
Under Italy's new manager Antonio Conte, Balotelli only received one call-up in November 2014 but was unable to make a single appearance for Italy due to injury. After a lacklustre season with Milan, he was omitted from Conte's 23-man squad for UEFA Euro 2016. After Italy failed to qualify for the 2018 World Cup, Balotelli was expected to be called up by caretaker manager Luigi Di Biagio for Italy's March 2018 friendlies, after the replacement of Gian Piero Ventura. However, Balotelli was officially omitted from the squad on 17 March 2018.

On 19 May 2018, Balotelli was called up for the first time since November 2014 by newly appointed manager Roberto Mancini for Italy's May and June 2018 friendlies. On 28 May, Balotelli made his first appearance for the national team since the 2014 World Cup, starting in the match against Saudi Arabia and scoring the opener in the 20th minute. He was later substituted in the 58th minute for Andrea Belotti, who scored the second goal of the match in an eventual 2–1 victory. Balotelli dedicated his goal to former Italy teammate Davide Astori, who died earlier in the year. On 24 January 2022, after a four-year international absence, Balotelli was called up by Italy manager Roberto Mancini to join the Azzurri for a three-day training camp in Coverciano.

== Player profile ==
=== Style of play ===
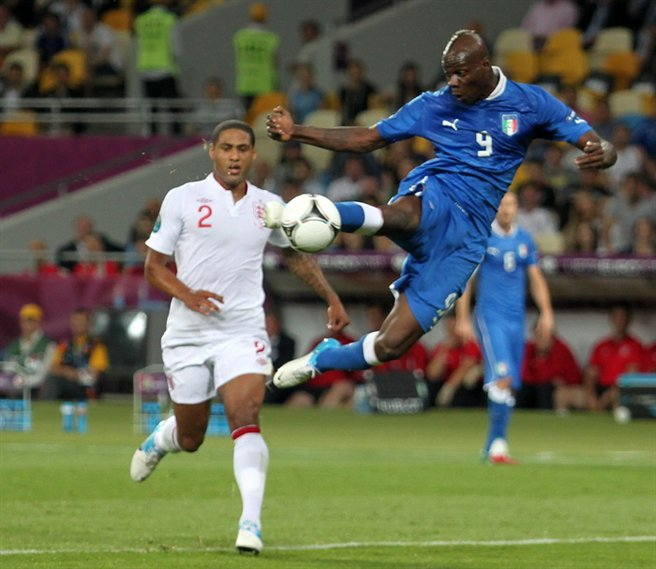
Balotelli playing against England in 2012

Agile, quick, creative and powerful, Balotelli is credited with pace, flair, physical strength, technical ability and an eye for goal. His height, elevation and physique allow him to excel in the air, and he is capable of scoring with his head or with either foot, from both inside or outside the penalty area, despite being naturally right-footed. Although he normally plays in a central role as a main striker, he is a versatile forward capable of playing anywhere along the front line and has also been deployed as a winger or as a second striker.

Despite his talent, he has been criticized by managers, teammates and the media for a perceived poor and immature attitude at times, as well as for his poor movement and work-rate, inconsistency, mentality, and volatile temperament and arrogant behaviour on the pitch, which has often led him to pick up unnecessary bookings throughout his career. Balotelli has also been accused of diving, and is thus regarded by teammates and the media as a promising but undisciplined player.

Due to his powerful shot, Balotelli is also a set-piece specialist, and is regarded as one of the best penalty kick takers in world football, a view backed by his former Manchester City goalkeeping teammate Joe Hart. Balotelli missed his first competitive penalty against Napoli on 22 September 2013 when it was saved by Pepe Reina, the first time in 22 attempts as a professional. In total, he has scored 38 of 43 penalties taken.

=== Personality ===
I could write a book of 200 pages of my two years at Inter with Mario, but the book would not be a drama – it would be a comedy. I remember one time when we went to play Kazan in the [2009–10] Champions League. In that match I had all my strikers injured... I was really in trouble and Mario was the only one. Mario got a yellow card in the 42nd [20th] minute, so when I got to the dressing room at half-time I spend about 14 minutes of the 15 available speaking only to Mario. I said to him: 'Mario, I cannot change you, I have no strikers on the bench, so don't touch anybody and play only with the ball. If we lose the ball no reaction. If someone provokes you, no reaction, if the referee makes a mistake, no reaction.' The 46th [60th] minute – red card!

— Mourinho recalls Balotelli's dismissal in October 2012

Balotelli is nicknamed "Super Mario" after the Italian video game character Mario from the iconic Nintendo series. Balotelli has been given a reputation by the media for being a difficult character and taking part in questionable and often amusing activities. He was once described by José Mourinho as "unmanageable". In June 2010, Balotelli and a group of friends fired air pistols in the open in Milan's Piazza della Repubblica. Although denying he is "crazy" as his mentor Roberto Mancini frequently claims, Balotelli has admitted he "sometimes does strange things". In 2010, he was photographed in the company of two noted Mafia mobsters. Balotelli gained a cult following after joining Manchester City. Manchester City supporters regularly sang a song with lyrics which made reference to his activities. Musician Tinchy Stryder recorded a song in Balotelli's honour, "Mario Balotelli".

Balotelli was the subject of numerous newspaper stories after joining Manchester City, some based in fact, others the subject of rumour and speculation. Within days of joining Manchester City, Balotelli was involved in a car crash. It was reported Balotelli was carrying £5,000 cash at the time, and that when a police officer asked why he had such a large sum of cash, Balotelli replied, "Because I am rich." Off-field activities involving Balotelli have included driving into a women's prison in Italy to "have a look round", and throwing darts at a youth team player during a training ground "prank" – all of which have been confirmed to be true. Balotelli was also subjected to tabloid rumours about him confronting a bully in a school after querying why a young Manchester City fan was not attending classes, and giving £1,000 to a homeless man on the streets of Manchester. Both of these reports turned out to be false.

Video footage before Manchester City's UEFA Europa League match with Dynamo Kyiv in March 2011 showed Balotelli requiring assistance to put on a training ground bib, an incident which teammate Edin Džeko was seen mimicking the following week in the warm up before City's match at Chelsea. In September 2011, Balotelli was reportedly seen using his iPad while on the substitutes' bench for Italy during their match with the Faroe Islands, although he denied this on a visit to a prison later that week.

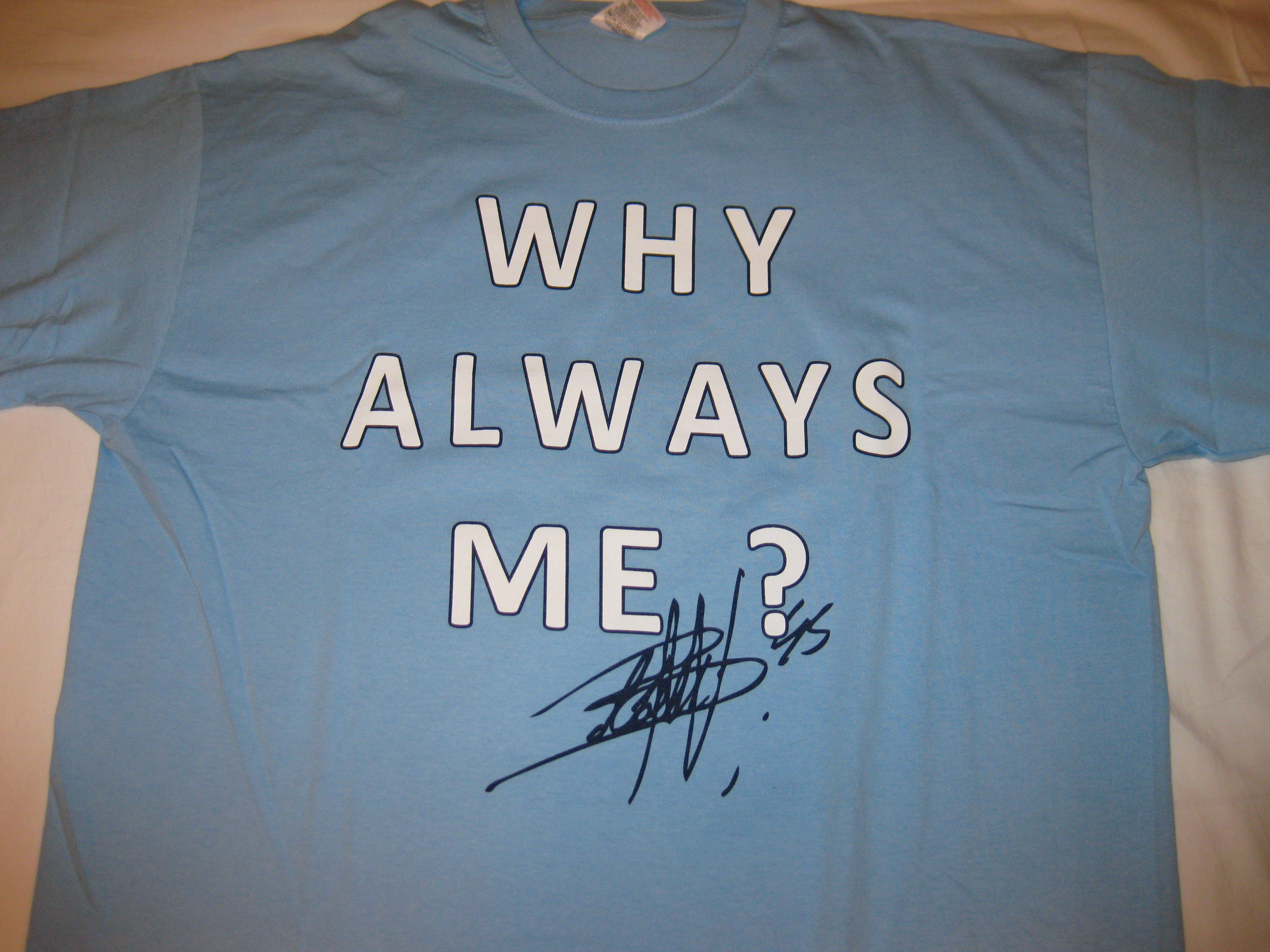
A T-shirt printed with the words "Why always me?", similar to the one worn by Balotelli

Balotelli celebrated his goal against Manchester United in October 2011 by lifting his shirt to reveal a base layer bearing the message "Why always me?". The day before the match, Balotelli and his friends set part of Balotelli's house on fire when a firework was set off in it. Later that week, Balotelli was unveiled as Greater Manchester's ambassador for firework safety. On 5 November 2011, at the annual fireworks display at Edenbridge, Kent, a 12-metre tall bonfire effigy of Balotelli was unveiled, complete with a Super Mario hat, a house in the right hand and a "Giant TNT" firework in his left, which were reference to his recent incident. In December 2011, Balotelli broke a 48-hour curfew before Manchester City's match against Chelsea to go to a curry house, although he "was not drinking alcohol, signed autographs, posed for pictures with fellow diners and was involved in a mock sword-fight using rolling pins". The club launched an internal investigation.

In March 2012, when Inter Milan (Balotelli's former club) held a press conference for their new manager Andrea Stramaccioni, Balotelli gatecrashed the event. In 2012 Balotelli explained why he doesn't celebrate when he scores: "When I score, I don't celebrate because it's my job. When a postman delivers letters, does he celebrate?". The following day he scored a brace against Germany in the Euro semi finals and celebrated by taking off his shirt and flexing his muscles which popularized his quote due to the irony. In December 2012, Balotelli was due to take Manchester City to a Premier League tribunal to protest against a fine of two weeks' wages over his poor disciplinary record, but eventually dropped his application a day before the hearing. On 1 December 2014, Balotelli was accused of racism and antisemitism for posting an image on Instagram of the video game character Mario. The image promoted anti-racism by telling others to be like the character, attributing him qualities stereotypically associated with different ethnicities, ending the idea that he "jumps like a black man and grabs coins like a jew". In response to criticisms, he wrote, "My Mom is jewish so all of u shut up please."

I told him, if you played with me 10 years ago I would give you every day maybe one punch in your head. There are different ways to help a guy like Mario. I don't speak with him every day, otherwise I would need a psychologist, but I speak with him because I don't want him to lose his quality. If Mario is not one of the best players in the world it will be his fault, because he has everything. Mario can be one of the top players in Europe. I don't want him to lose his talent.

— Mancini on 6 April 2012

I've finished my words for him. I've finished. I love him as a guy, as a player. I know him. He's not a bad guy and [he] is a fantastic player. But, at this moment, I'm very sorry for him because he continues to lose his talent, his quality. I hope, for him, he can understand that he's in a bad way for his future. And he can change his behaviour in the future. But I'm finished.

— Mancini on 8 April 2012, following Balotelli's dismissal against Arsenal

== Personal life ==
In 2012, Balotelli featured in GQ, where he was named the second-best dressed man in the world behind British musician Tinie Tempah. Balotelli also appeared on the cover of the November 2012 edition of Time magazine. Balotelli is a fan of mixed martial arts and has said in the past he would love to compete in the sport professionally if he were not a footballer. Balotelli no longer drinks alcohol.

In July 2012, Balotelli's former girlfriend Raffaella Fico revealed she was pregnant with his child, while Balotelli responded by claiming he would only assume paternal responsibilities upon a positive paternity test. Fico's daughter Pia was born on 5 December 2012. Later in December 2012, Fico accused Balotelli of being "irresponsible" and "not interested" in her newborn daughter. In response, Balotelli threatened to take legal action against Fico to defend his reputation against what he considered false accusations. In February 2014, Balotelli finally acknowledged paternity of his daughter Pia following a positive DNA test. Previously, Balotelli was romantically involved with Fanny Neguesha in 2013 and 2014, becoming engaged at some point. On 28 September 2017, Balotelli fathered a second child, a son named Lion, born to an unidentified woman.

== Career statistics ==
=== Club ===
As of match played 15 May 2026

Appearances and goals by club, season and competition
Club	Season	League			National cup (Note: Includes Coppa Italia, FA Cup, Turkish Cup and Swiss Cup)		League cup (Note: Includes EFL Cup and Coupe de la Ligue)		Continental		Other		Total	
Club	Season	Division	Apps	Goals	Apps	Goals	Apps	Goals	Apps	Goals	Apps	Goals	Apps	Goals
Lumezzane	2005–06	Serie C1	2	0	—		—		—		—		2	0
Inter Milan	2007–08	Serie A	11	3	4	4	—		0	0	0	0	15	7
Inter Milan	2008–09	Serie A	22	8	2	0	—		6 (Note: Appearances in UEFA Champions League)	1	1 (Note: Appearance in Supercoppa Italiana)	1	31	10
Inter Milan	2009–10	Serie A	26	9	5	1	—		8	1	1	0	40	11
Inter Milan	Total		59	20	11	5	—		14	2	2	1	86	28
Manchester City	2010–11	Premier League	17	6	5	1	0	0	6 (Note: Appearances in UEFA Europa League)	3	—		28	10
Manchester City	2011–12	Premier League	23	13	0	0	2	1	6 (Note: Three appearances and two goals in UEFA Champions League, three appearances and one goal in UEFA Europa League)	3	1 (Note: Appearance in FA Community Shield)	0	32	17
Manchester City	2012–13	Premier League	14	1	1	0	1	1	4	1	0	0	20	3
Manchester City	Total		54	20	6	1	3	2	16	7	1	0	80	30
AC Milan	2012–13	Serie A	13	12	0	0	—		—		—		13	12
AC Milan	2013–14	Serie A	30	14	1	1	—		10	3	—		41	18
AC Milan	Total		43	26	1	1	—		10	3	—		54	30
Liverpool	2014–15	Premier League	16	1	4	0	3	1	5 (Note: Three appearances and one goal in UEFA Champions League, two appearances and one goal in UEFA Europa League)	2	—		28	4
AC Milan (loan)	2015–16	Serie A	20	1	3	2	—		—		—		23	3
Nice	2016–17	Ligue 1	23	15	0	0	1	1	4	1	—		28	17
Nice	2017–18	Ligue 1	28	18	0	0	1	1	9 (Note: Two appearances and one goal in UEFA Champions League, five appearances and four goals in UEFA Europa League)	7	—		38	26
Nice	2018–19	Ligue 1	10	0	0	0	0	0	—		—		10	0
Nice	Total		61	33	0	0	2	2	13	8	—		76	43
Marseille	2018–19	Ligue 1	15	8	0	0	0	0	—		—		15	8
Brescia	2019–20	Serie A	19	5	0	0	—		—		—		19	5
Monza	2020–21	Serie B	12	5	—		—		—		2 (Note: Appearances in Serie B promotion play-offs)	1	14	6
Adana Demirspor	2021–22	Süper Lig	31	18	2	1	—		—		—		33	19
Adana Demirspor	2022–23	Süper Lig	2	0	—		—		—		–		2	0
Adana Demirspor	Total		33	18	2	1	—		—		—		35	19
Sion	2022–23	Super League	18	6	1	0	—		—		—		19	6
Adana Demirspor	2023–24	Süper Lig	16	7	—		—		—		—		16	7
Genoa	2024–25	Serie A	6	0	—		—		—		—		6	0
Al-Ittifaq	2025–26	UAE First Division	12	6	—		—		—		—		12	6
Career total			386	156	28	10	8	5	58	22	5	2	485	195

=== International ===
Appearances and goals by national team and year
National team	Year	Apps	Goals
Italy	2010	2	0
Italy	2011	5	1
Italy	2012	9	4
Italy	2013	13	7
Italy	2014	4	1
Italy	2015	0	0
Italy	2016	0	0
Italy	2017	0	0
Italy	2018	3	1
Total		36	14

Italy score listed first, score column indicates score after each Balotelli goal

List of international goals scored by Mario Balotelli
No.	Date	Venue	Opponent	Score	Result	Competition
1	11 November 2011	Stadion Miejski, Wrocław, Poland	Poland	1–0	2–0	Friendly
2	18 June 2012	Municipal Stadium, Poznań, Poland	Republic of Ireland	2–0	2–0	UEFA Euro 2012
3	28 June 2012	National Stadium, Warsaw, Poland	Germany	1–0	2–1	UEFA Euro 2012
4	28 June 2012	National Stadium, Warsaw, Poland	Germany	2–0	2–1	UEFA Euro 2012
5	16 October 2012	San Siro, Milan, Italy	Denmark	3–1	3–1	2014 FIFA World Cup qualification
6	21 March 2013	Stade de Genève, Geneva, Switzerland	Brazil	2–2	2–2	Friendly
7	26 March 2013	Ta' Qali National Stadium, Ta' Qali, Malta	Malta	1–0	2–0	2014 FIFA World Cup qualification
8	26 March 2013	Ta' Qali National Stadium, Ta' Qali, Malta	Malta	2–0	2–0	2014 FIFA World Cup qualification
9	16 June 2013	Estádio do Maracanã, Rio de Janeiro, Brazil	Mexico	2–1	2–1	2013 FIFA Confederations Cup
10	19 June 2013	Arena Pernambuco, Recife, Brazil	Japan	3–2	4–3	2013 FIFA Confederations Cup
11	10 September 2013	Juventus Stadium, Turin, Italy	Czech Republic	2–1	2–1	2014 FIFA World Cup qualification
12	15 October 2013	Stadio San Paolo, Naples, Italy	Armenia	2–2	2–2	2014 FIFA World Cup qualification
13	14 June 2014	Arena Amazonia, Manaus, Brazil	England	2–1	2–1	2014 FIFA World Cup
14	28 May 2018	Kybunpark, St. Gallen, Switzerland	Saudi Arabia	1–0	2–1	Friendly

== Honours ==
Inter Milan

- Serie A: 2007–08, 2008–09, 2009–10
- Coppa Italia: 2009–10
- Supercoppa Italiana: 2008
- UEFA Champions League: 2009–10

Manchester City

- Premier League: 2011–12
- FA Cup: 2010–11

Italy

- UEFA European Championship runner-up: 2012
- FIFA Confederations Cup third place: 2013

Individual

- Golden Boy: 2010
- UEFA European Championship Team of the Tournament: 2012
- Serie A Team of the Year: 2012–13
- FIFA FIFPro World XI 4th team: 2013
- UNFP Ligue 1 Player of the Month: March 2019
