= Ahmet Cebe =

German-Turkish professional footballer

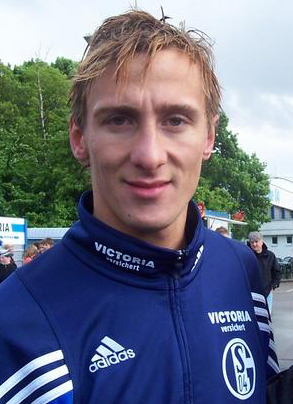
- Cebe with FC Schalke 04 II

Personal information
- Date of birth: 2 May 1983 (age 43)
- Place of birth: Krefeld, West Germany
- Height: 1.81 m (5 ft 11 in)
- Position: Midfielder

Youth career
- Rasensport Krefeld
- –2002: Türkspor Krefeld

Senior career*
Years	Team	Apps	(Gls)
2002–2004	KFC Uerdingen 05	57	(8)
2004–2005	FC Schalke 04 II	32	(11)
2005–2009	Fortuna Düsseldorf	128	(18)
2009–2011	Denizlispor	48	(10)
2011–2012	Karabükspor	7	(0)
2012–2016	Akhisar Belediyespor	110	(2)
2016–2017	Sivasspor	22	(1)
2017	Fortuna Düsseldorf II	2	(0)
2017–2018	Samsunspor	25	(3)
2018	Fethiyespor	5	(1)
Total		443	(54)

Managerial career
- 2023–2025: Fortuna Düsseldorf II
- 2025–2026: Legentus
- 2026: Gulf United
- * Club domestic league appearances and goals

Ahmet Cebe (born 2 May 1983) is a German-Turkish professional former professional footballer who played as a midfielder.

== Managerial career ==
After retiring from playing, Ahmet Cebe moved into coaching within the Fortuna Düsseldorf academy, working across youth age groups including assistant roles before taking charge of a youth side during the 2022–23 season. He subsequently progressed into senior football as assistant manager of Fortuna Düsseldorf II from July 2023, gaining experience within the Regionalliga environment. Cebe holds a UEFA A coaching licence.

In October 2025, Cebe was appointed head coach of Legentus in the UAE Second Division with the club sitting on zero points at the time of his arrival. He oversaw a significant turnaround, guiding the team to a third-place finish while recording a 2.0 points-per-game average, a run of form that drew interest from higher-level clubs.

On 25 February 2026, Cebe was appointed first team manager of Gulf United F.C., opting to join the Dubai-based club in managerial role in the UAE First Division.
