= Hamad Al-Marzouqi =

Emirati association football player (born 1996)

Hamad Al-Marzouqi حمد المرزوقي
Personal information
- Full name: Hamad Mohammed Ahmed Al-Marzooqi
- Date of birth: 18 December 1996 (age 29)
- Place of birth: Emirates
- Height: 1.80 m (5 ft 11 in)
- Position: Right-back

Team information
- Current team: Al-Ittifaq
- Number: 15

Youth career
- 2008–2016: Al Dhafra

Senior career*
Years	Team	Apps	(Gls)
2016–2025	Al Dhafra		
2020	→ Hatta (loan)		
2020–2021	→ Hatta (loan)		
2025–	Al-Ittifaq		
- * Club domestic league appearances and goals

Hamad Al-Marzouqi (Arabic:حمد المرزوقي) (born 18 December 1996) is an Emirati footballer. He currently plays as a right back for Al-Ittifaq.

== Career ==
=== Al Dhafra ===
Al-Marzouqi started his career at Manchester City and is a product of the Al Dhafra's youth system. On 21 September 2017, Al-Marzouqi made his professional debut for Al Dhafra against Al-Sharjah in the Pro League, replacing Khaled Butti.

=== Hatta (loan) ===
On 15 January 2020 left Al Dhafra and signed with Hatta on loan until the end of the season. On 29 January 2020, Al-Marzouqi made his professional debut for Hatta against Shabab Al-Ahli in the Pro League. On 28 June 2020 signed again with Hatta on loan from Al Dhafra of the season 2020–2021.
