= Richard Peniket =

English footballer (born 1993)

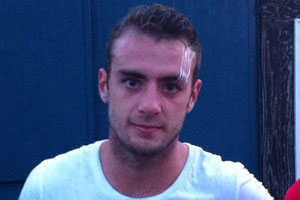
- Peniket in 2013

Personal information
- Full name: Richard James Peniket
- Date of birth: 4 March 1993 (age 33)
- Place of birth: Stourbridge, England
- Height: 6 ft 3 in (1.91 m)
- Position: Forward

Youth career
- –2009: Walsall
- 2009–2011: Fulham

Senior career*
Years	Team	Apps	(Gls)
2011–2013	Fulham	0	(0)
2011–2012	→ Hereford United (loan)	7	(0)
2012	→ Kidderminster Harriers (loan)	11	(0)
2013	→ AFC Telford United (loan)	6	(1)
2013	→ Farnborough (loan))	11	(6)
2013–2014	Tamworth	42	(7)
2014–2017	FC Halifax Town	90	(17)
2015	→ AFC Telford United (loan)	4	(0)
2017–2018	Gateshead	40	(6)
2018–2019	Alfreton Town	39	(5)
2019–2020	Kidderminster Harriers	21	(2)
2021–2024	Gulf United	26	(19)
Total		297	(63)

International career^{‡}
- Wales U17
	Wales U19	6	
2011	Wales U21	1	(0)

Managerial career
- 2024–2025: Gulf United
- * Club domestic league appearances and goals as of 15:05, 6 January 2025 (UTC) ‡ National team caps and goals as of 15:00, 19 April 2020 (UTC)

Richard James Peniket (born 4 March 1993) is an association football manager and former player who played as a forward. He last managed Emirati club Gulf United.

== Playing career ==
=== Walsall ===
Peniket was born in Stourbridge, West Midlands, and began his football career with Walsall.

=== Fulham ===
In 2009, despite interest from Manchester United, Peniket joined Fulham. In June 2010, Peniket signed his first professional contract, keeping him until 2013.

In October 2011, Peniket joined League Two club Hereford on a one-month loan, later extended until the end of the season. He made his Football League debut in the 2–1 home defeat to Bristol Rovers on 10 January 2012, replacing Delroy Facey for the last twelve minutes of the match.

On 30 August 2012, Peniket signed for Conference National team Kidderminster Harriers on a loan deal from Fulham until January 2013. He made his début for Kidderminster in a 1–1 draw against Barrow, coming on as a substitute in the 71st minute. On 21 November, Fulham confirmed that Peniket had been recalled.

Peniket signed for Conference side AFC Telford United on a one-month loan on 29 January 2013 and made his début the same day, against Kidderminster Harriers away, losing the match 1–0. Peniket scored his first ever senior goal for AFC Telford United against Hyde at New Bucks Head on 12 February 2013.

On 2 March 2013, Peniket signed for Conference South club Farnborough on an initial one-month loan deal. On 22 March 2013, this loan was extended until the end of the season.

Peniket was one of twelve players released by Fulham at the end of the 2012–13 Premier League season.

=== Tamworth ===
Following his release by Fulham, Peniket moved down four divisions to join Conference National side Tamworth on a one-year contract. He scored twice in a 4–1 victory over Southport on 7 September 2013, after failing to score in his first five games.

=== FC Halifax Town ===
Peniket signed for FC Halifax Town on 24 June 2014 on a free transfer. He scored his first two goals for the Yorkshire side in a 3–0 victory over Welling.

=== Gateshead ===
On 26 May 2017, Peniket signed a one-year deal with National League side Gateshead following him turning down the offer of a new contract from Halifax. He made his debut on 5 August in a 1–2 defeat away to Woking and scored his first goal for the club the following week in a 3–0 victory over Torquay United.

=== Alfreton Town ===
In June 2018, Peniket joined National League North side Alfreton Town on a one-year deal.

=== Return to Kidderminster Harriers ===
In June 2019, Peniket returned to Kidderminster Harriers. He departed the club on 21 January 2020, stating he wanted to take some time away from football and give himself a chance to recover from cumulative injuries.

=== Gulf United ===
In January 2022, Peniket signed with Gulf United. Peniket featured regularly and finished the 2021–22 season with 8 goals in 11 games. Gulf United managed to secure promotion to the UAE Second Division, as well as winning the UAE Third Division title.

In the 2022–23, Peniket's second season with Gulf United, he led them to become champions of the UAE Second Division, achieving back-to-back promotions for the first team in UAE Football History, along the way securing promotion to the UAE First Division.

Peniket ended the season as the clubs top goalscorer for the 2022–23 season with 11 goals to his name, and also second top goalscorer in the league. Peniket retired from playing at the end of the 2023–24 season, as the club's all-time top goalscorer.

== International career ==
Peniket has played for Wales at levels up to under-21. He has six appearances for the Wales under-19 team, and made his debut for the under-21s in a 2–1 friendly defeat against Hungary on 10 August 2011.

== Coaching career ==
On 25 August 2024, following his retirement from playing, Peniket was announced as new Gulf United manager. He had previously managed the club's B-team for a short time, but decided to retire from playing to focus fully on management after being promoted to the first team job.

Peniket served as Head coach of Gulf United in the UAE First Division. Working within a limited playing budget, he guided the club to a mid table finish, ending the season 19 points clear above the relegation zone. Peniket resigned from his position in July 2025.

In June 2026, Peniket was appointed head coach of Rimal Al Sahra in the UAE Second Division. He recorded eight wins and two defeats in his opening ten competitive matches, making a positive start to his tenure as the club looks to build on its early season form.

== Career statistics ==
As of match played 21 November 2017

Appearances and goals by club, season and competition
Club	Season	League			FA Cup		League Cup		Other		Total	
Club	Season	Division	Apps	Goals	Apps	Goals	Apps	Goals	Apps	Goals	Apps	Goals
Hereford United (loan)	2011–12	League Two	7	0	0	0	0	0	0	0	7	0
Kidderminster Harriers (loan)	2012–13	Conference Premier	11	0	1	0	—		0	0	12	0
Telford United (loan)	2012–13	Conference Premier	6	1	—		—		0	0	6	1
Farnborough (loan)	2013–14	Conference South	11	6	0	0	—		0	0	11	6
Tamworth	2013–14	Conference Premier	42	7	2	1	—		4 (Note: Appearances in the FA Trophy)	0	48	8
FC Halifax Town	2014–15	Conference Premier	34	6	3	2	—		4	4	41	12
FC Halifax Town	2015–16	National League	17	0	0	0	—		4	0	21	0
FC Halifax Town	2016–17	National League North	39	11	3	1	—		0	0	42	12
FC Halifax Town	Total		90	17	6	3	0	0	8	4	104	24
Telford United (loan)	2015–16	National League North	4	0	0	0	—		0	0	4	0
Gateshead	2017–18	National League	19	3	1	0	—		0	0	20	3
Career total			190	34	10	4	0	0	12	4	212	42

=== Managerial statistics ===
As of match played 5 January 2025

Managerial record by team and tenure
Team	From	To	Record					Ref
Team	From	To	P26	W7	D8	L11	Win %	Ref
Gulf United	25 August 2024	Present		7	8	11	70.0	
Total			10	1	1	8	10.0	

== Honours ==
FC Halifax Town

- FA Trophy: 2015–16

Gulf United

- UAE Third Division: 2021–22
