= Manyumow Achol =

South Sudanese footballer

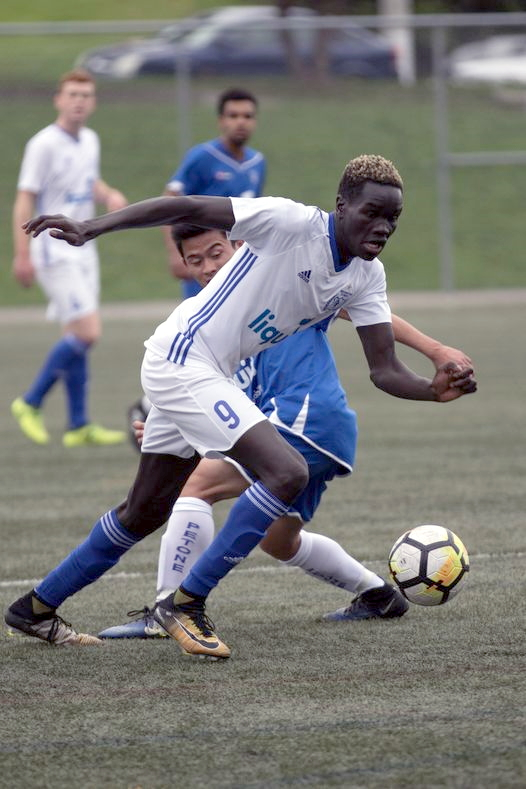
- Achol with Wellington Olympic in 2018

Personal information
- Date of birth: 10 December 2000 (age 25)
- Height: 1.93 m (6 ft 4 in)
- Position: Midfielder

Youth career
- 2015: Lower Hutt City
- 2017: St Patrick's College
- 2017–2018: Wellington Olympic

College career
Years	Team	Apps	(Gls)
2018	Rio Grande Red Storm	20	(8)

Senior career*
Years	Team	Apps	(Gls)
2017–2018	Wellington Olympic	25	(5)
2017–2018	Wellington Phoenix Reserves	1	(0)
2018	Lower Hutt City	5	(0)
2019	Wellington United	15	(7)
2019–2020	Eauze		
2020	Kingston City		
2020	Eastern Suburbs	0	(0)
2021	Hawke's Bay United	6	(0)
2021	Lower Hutt City	13	(5)
2021	Wellington Phoenix Reserves	6	(0)
2022	Gulf United	3	(1)
2022–2024	Auda	49	(3)
2024–2025	Septemvri Sofia	11	(0)
2025	DFK Dainava	15	(1)

International career^{‡}
2020–	South Sudan	12	(0)
- * Club domestic league appearances and goals as of 29 July 2026 (UTC) ‡ National team caps and goals as of 16 November 2020

Manyumow Achol (born 10 December 2000) is a South Sudanese professional footballer who plays as a winger or a midfielder for Dainava Club and the South Sudan national team.

== Early life ==
Achol was born in South Sudan, then part of Sudan, but left with his grandmother and arrived in New Zealand aged six as a refugee, settling in Wellington.

== Club career ==
Achol played for his school team at St Patrick's College in Wellington, alongside New Zealand international Liberato Cacace. Achol helped his college team win the Wellington Premier Youth football league, scoring in the 2–1 final against Hutt International Boys' School.

Achol played for both Wellington Olympic reserves and their first team, who played in the Capital Football Central League. He was part of their under-19 team that finished runner-up in the Napier U-19 tournament to Ellerslie. Achol then had a brief spell with fellow Central League team Lower Hutt before he joined Wellington United for the 2019 season, captaining the team.

Achol made one appearance for the Wellington Phoenix Reserves in the ISPS Handa Premiership, coming on as a substitute in a 5–0 loss against Waitakere United on 5 November 2017.

In 2020, after a short stint with French club Eauze, Achol signed with Australian club Kingston City who played in the second division of the National Premier League Victoria. Just before the season was due to start, Victoria went into lockdown due to COVID-19 and the league was postponed for a month. Before the suspension was lifted, Football Victoria extended it again until 31 May 2020. Achol returned to New Zealand where he played for Eastern Suburbs in the NRFL Premier.

In 2021, Achol signed with Hawke's Bay United who play in the ISPS Handa Men's Premiership. He played his first game for the club against Team Wellington on 17 January 2021, coming on as a substitute in the second half. He got his first start in the league, a week later in their 4–1 win against Hamilton Wanderers.

On 31 March, it was announced that Achol had joined Lower Hutt City who he had played for previously and are currently playing in the New Zealand Central League. His first game back was against Wainuiomata where Achol also scored in the 25 minute.

In January 2022, Achol signed with Gulf United FC in the UAE Third Division and was reunited with former Wellington Phoenix teammate Steven Taylor. In March 2022, Achol signed with FK Auda in the Latvian Higher League. Gulf United were eventually crowned champions for the UAE Third Division 2021–22 Season, however Achol did not feature in enough competitive features to receive a medal.

On 17 June 2022, Achol scored his first goal for FK Auda in the 94th minute during a Latvian Higher League match against Spartaks Jūrmala.

== International career ==
On 12 November 2020, Achol was called up to play for South Sudan in their qualifiers for the 2021 Africa Cup of Nations games against Uganda. Starting in the first game, Achol played 68 minutes before being substituted in a 1–0 loss. This was followed by another start in the return fixture that South Sudan won 1–0.

Achol was again called up for the last two group games against Malawi and Burkina Faso, getting a full 90 minutes in the first game and 60 minutes in the second. As South Sudan lost both of the games 1–0, they finished last in qualifying Group B.
