= Yaqoub Al-Baloushi =

Emirati footballer (born 1990)

Personal information
- Full name: Yaqoub Hassan Mohammed Al-Baloushi
- Date of birth: 10 July 1990 (age 36)
- Place of birth: United Arab Emirates
- Height: 1.86 m (6 ft 1 in)
- Position: Defender

Youth career
- Ittihad Kalba

Senior career*
Years	Team	Apps	(Gls)
2010–2019	Ittihad Kalba	55	(2)
2011–2012	→ Al-Shaab (loan)	3	(0)
2019–2023	Al Nasr	37	(0)
2023–2024	Ittihad Kalba	4	(0)
2024–2025	Emirates		
2025–2026	Al-Ittifaq		
- * Club domestic league appearances and goals

Yaqoub Al-Baloushi (Arabic: يعقوب البلوشي; born 10 July 1990) is an Emirati footballer. He currently plays as a defender.
