= Haitham =

Haytham
- Pronunciation: Hay-tham, Hai-sam
- Gender: Male
- Language: Aramaic, Arabic

Origin
- Meaning: Young hawk or Young eagle
- Region of origin: Middle East, North Africa

Other names
- Alternative spelling: Haytham, Haithem, Heithem, Haitam
- Variant forms: Haithem, Haytham

Haytham, Haitham or Haitem (Arabic: هيثم) is an Arabic male name meaning "young hawk" or "young eagle". It is highly popular among Middle Eastern communities and originated in Arab States of the Persian Gulf.

The name is derived from the ancient Semitic triliteral root H‑Y‑TH, associated in Arabic with a young eagle or hawk, with underlying roots in Proto‑Semitic meanings related to vitality, sharpness, or strong birds of prey. Parallels in other Semitic languages support this origin: in Syriac (Aramaic), terms such as ḥayṭā (falcon, hawk) reflect the same semantic field of sharp‑sighted birds. While in Hebrew, related roots like ḥayyāh (חיה, living creature) show the broader Proto‑Semitic pattern linking the consonants ḥ‑y with life, strength, or predatory birds.

Notable people with this name include:

== Given name ==
- Ibn al-Haytham (965–1040), mathematician, astronomer, and physicist of the Islamic Golden Age
- Haytham I, Shirvanshah (r. 861–??)
- Haytham II, Shirvanshah
- Haitham Ahmed Zaki (born 1984), Egyptian actor
- Haithem Al-Matroushi (born 1988), Emirati footballer
- Haithem Ben Alayech (born 1989), Tunisian wrestler
- Haitham El Hossainy (born 1977), Egyptian judoka
- Haytham Faour (born 1990), Lebanese footballer
- Haitham Kadhim (born 1983), Iraqi footballer
- Haithem Mahmoud (born 1991), Egyptian wrestler
- Haitham Mrabet (born 1980), Tunisian footballer
- Haitham Mustafa (born 1977), Sudanese footballer
- Haytham Ali Tabatabai (1968–2025), Lebanese Hezbollah senior commander
- Haytham Tambal (born 1978), Sudanese football striker
- Haitham bin Tariq (born 1955), present Sultan of Oman
- Haitham Yousif (born 1969), Assyrian singer
- Haitham Zein (born 1979), Lebanese footballer

== Surname ==
- Malik ibn al-Haytham al-Khuza'i, Khurasan missionary leader

== Fictional characters ==
- Haytham Kenway, character in the Assassin's Creed video game franchise
- Alhaitham, a character in the video game Genshin Impact
