= Khalid Ghuloom =

Emirati association football player (born 1996)

Khalid Ghuloom خالد غلوم
Personal information
- Full name: Khalid Hussain Ghuloom Abbas Al-Mazmi
- Date of birth: 18 August 1996 (age 30)
- Place of birth: Emirates
- Height: 1.65 m (5 ft 5 in)
- Position: Winger

Team information
- Current team: Gulf United
- Number: 22

Youth career
- Al-Sharjah

Senior career*
Years	Team	Apps	(Gls)
2019–2021	Khor Fakkan	1	(0)
2021	→ Al Urooba (loan)		
2021–2023	Al Fujairah		
2023–2024	Al-Hamriyah		
2024–2025	Fleetwood United		
2025–	Gulf United		
- * Club domestic league appearances and goals as of 10:50, 30 December 2020 (UTC)

Khalid Hussain Ghuloom Abbas Al-Mazmi (Arabic: خالد غلوم; born 18 August 1996) is an Emirati professional footballer who plays as a winger for Gulf United.

== Career statistics ==
=== Club ===
As of 30 December 2020.

== Career statistics ==
Club	Season	League			Cup		Continental		Other		Total	
Club	Season	Division	Apps	Goals	Apps	Goals	Apps	Goals	Apps	Goals	Apps	Goals
Khor Fakkan	2019–20	UAE Pro League	0	0	0	0	—		—		1	0
Khor Fakkan	2020–21	UAE Pro League	1	0	0	0	—		—		1	0
Khor Fakkan	Career totals		1	0	0	0	0	0	0	0	1	0
