= Ahmed Al-Naqbi =

Emirati association football player

Ahmed Al Naqbi أحمد النقبي
Personal information
- Full name: Ahmed Amir Saeed Al Naqbi
- Date of birth: 9 March 1998 (age 28)
- Place of birth: Fujairah, United Arab Emirates
- Height: 1.74 m (5 ft 9 in)
- Position: Forward

Team information
- Current team: Kalba
- Number: 19

Youth career
- 2010–2016: Kalba

Senior career*
Years	Team	Apps	(Gls)
2016–	Kalba	77	(17)
2020	→ Leganés C (loan)	0	(0)
2025	→ Al-Orooba (loan)	6	(0)
- * Club domestic league appearances and goals

Ahmed Al Naqbi (Arabic:أحمد النقبي) (born 9 March 1998) is an Emirati footballer. He currently plays as a forward for Kalba.

== Career ==
=== Ittihad Kalba ===
Al Naqbi started his career at Ittihad Kalba and is a product of the Ittihad Kalba's youth system. On 29 November 2016, Al Naqbi made his professional debut for Ittihad Kalba against Al-Nasr in the Pro League, replacing Ciel .

=== Leganés C (loan) ===
On 19 November 2019 left Ittihad Kalba and signed with Leganés C With the player Mayed Mohsen on loan until the end of the season beginning in January 2020 after the Sharjah Sports Council signed a cooperation agreement with the Spanish club.
