= Brian Ramírez =

Argentine footballer (born 2000)

Personal information
- Full name: Brian Aramis Ramírez
- Date of birth: 29 August 2000 (age 26)
- Height: 1.70 m (5 ft 7 in)
- Position: Midfielder

Team information
- Current team: Spartak Subotica
- Number: 99

Youth career
- –2020: Banfield

Senior career*
Years	Team	Apps	(Gls)
2020–2021	Hatta Club	22	(1)
2021–2024	Kalba	42	(2)
2024–2025	Khor Fakkan	11	(2)
2025–	Spartak Subotica	12	(0)
- * Club domestic league appearances and goals as of 13 June 2026

Brian Aramis Ramírez (born 29 August 2000) is an Argentine footballer who currently plays as a midfielder for Serbian club Spartak Subotica.

== Career statistics ==
=== Club ===
As of 29 October 2020.

Club	Season	League			Cup		Continental		Other		Total	
Club	Season	Division	Apps	Goals	Apps	Goals	Apps	Goals	Apps	Goals	Apps	Goals
Hatta Club	2020–21	UAE Pro League	22	1	2 (Note: Appearances in the UAE League Cup)	1	0	0	0	0	24	2
Career total			22	1	2	1	0	0	0	0	24	2
