= Gulf United FC =

Emirati football club

Gulf United
- The People's Club
- Full name: Gulf United Football Club
- Nickname: The Eagles
- Founded: 2019; 7 years ago
- Ground: JA Sports and Shooting Club & Kings Al Barsha
- Chairman: Ahmed Hamada
- Manager: Andrés Iniesta
- League: UAE First Division League
- 2024–25: UAE Division 1, 10th
- Website: www.gulfunitedfc.com
Home colours	Away colours

Gulf United Football Club (Arabic: نادي اتحاد الخليج لكرة القدم) is an Emirati professional football club that started as an academy in Dubai. They currently play in the UAE First Division League, after achieving back-to-back promotions from the UAE Third Division and UAE Second Division in the 2022 and 2023.

== History ==
=== Founding ===
In 2019, Gulf United was founded in Dubai by Mo Jarad and brothers Conor Shiels and Jordi Shiels. The Shiels brothers and Jarad, originally from Manchester, brought a vision of building a professional-standard football academy that would be open to players of all backgrounds and nationalities. The club operates under a joint British and Emirati ownership model. Club President Ahmed Hamada has played a key role in developing Gulf United's relationships within the UAE football landscape.

=== UAE Third Division ===
In the 2021–22 season, Gulf United entered the UAE Third Division, a league that allows privately owned clubs and academies to join the UAE Football Pyramid. Soon after Steven Taylor was announced as the manager.

The 2021–22 UAE Third Division Season was formatted as two groups, where the winner of each group would face the runner-up of the other group in a play-off for promotion. Gulf United went unbeaten in the group stages finishing first in Group A. They faced Abtal Al Khaeej in the semi-final's, which was in a home & away format. Gulf United lost the first leg 1–0, and won the second leg 2–0, officially securing promotion to the UAE Second Division.

Gulf United then faced Group B winners Fleetwood United in the UAE Third Division final and were crowned eventual champions of the Third Division after beating Fleetwood United, sister club of Fleetwood Town 3–1 in the final of the inaugural season, with 2 goals from Cédrick Nana and 1 from Bonet Bobai, cementing them as UAE Third Division Champions.

=== UAE Second Division ===
The 2022–23 season was the clubs first in the UAE Second Division. The squad was strengthened with signings such as Devonte Redmond, Soheil Varahram and Max Johnstone as well as further signings in the January transfer window with former Real Madrid player Mink Peeters and former Celtic & Norwich City striker Gary Hooper.

After drawing their first game, Gulf United went on to win 5 games in a row, going into the Christmas period at the top of the league.

Gulf United went on to be crowned the champions of the 2022–23 UAE Second Division, and winning promotion to UAE First Division and making history by achieving the first ever back-to-back promotion in the history of UAE Football. The back-to-back Championships were led by the club captain, and now a Director at the Club, Jack Shiels, who continued as club captain into the UAE First Division.

=== UAE First Division ===
After completing the first back to back promotion in UAE football, Gulf United were promoted to the UAE First Division for the 2023–24 season. The previous campaign had seen both promoted clubs from the UAE Second Division, Fursan Hispana and Baynounah, relegated immediately, highlighting the scale of the step up to second tier level.

Ahead of the season, the club appointed former professional footballer Neil Taylor as first team manager, a role he combined with his position as assistant coach of the Wales under 21 national team. Gulf United also broke their transfer record with the signing of Scottish striker Josh Fowler.

In their debut UAE First Division campaign, Gulf United finished 15th, securing survival comfortably and ending the season clear of the relegation places. The campaign established the club at second tier level and provided several academy players with their first experience of senior professional football. Taylor departed at the conclusion of the season and subsequently took charge of Al Jazira’s under 21 side.

During the 2024–25 season, Gulf United recorded further progress under new manager Richard Peniket, the club’s all-time leading goalscorer, who had previously led Gulf United "B" in the UAE Third Division. The team finished 10th in the 18 team league, representing a five place improvement on their debut campaign. Notable results during the season included victories against eventual champions Al Dhafra, as well as Emirates, United FC and Masfout. Dutch forward Lars Veldwijk joined during the January transfer window and scored 14 goals in 12 appearances, contributing to a strong finish to the campaign.

Following the season, 16 first team players secured transfers to clubs in the UAE Pro League or UAE First Division, a club record. The improved league position consolidated Gulf United’s status in the division and increased its profile within Emirati professional football.

Ahead of the 2025–26 season, Gulf United appointed former Real Madrid academy coach Davi Iglesias Niño as first team manager. The club undertook a significant recruitment drive, signing Guinean centre back Julian Jeanvier from Kayserispor and Dutch midfielder Leroy Fer from Al Nasr in September 2025. Brazilian forward Weberty joined from Al Bataeh, along with Zambian under 20 international Emmanuel Mutale and former West Ham United academy graduate Archie Woods. In January 2026, the squad was further strengthened with the signing of Swedish international Robin Quaison and a managerial change to Ahmet Cebe who successfully kept the club in the UAE First Division for the third year in a row.

=== International friendlies ===
The club regularly plays in exhibition matches against global opponents showcasing the clubs young talent. In January 2022, Gulf United played with 7-time Slovak First Football League winners MŠK Žilina. In February 2022, Gulf United played a friendly fixture against Riga FC, a game in which Gulf United player Manyumow Achol was subsequently scouted and signed for FK Auda.

Gulf United also played Premier League side Newcastle United in a friendly match at NAS Sports Complex on the 24 March 2022, in which Newcastle won 5–0 with goals from Allan Saint-Maximin, Joelinton and Dwight Gayle.

On 6 January 2023, Gulf United played a friendly against Al Ain FC, the 21–22 UAE Pro League defending champions, and who are widely recognised as being the most successful club in the UAE. The match ended 1–0 to Al Ain FC with a goal scored by UAE international Bandar Al-Ahbabi.

The club faced Al-Ittihad Club in a friendly match on 18 December 2024, losing 1–0. They met again in a separate friendly on 14 December 2025.

Gulf United have also faced various national teams in friendly fixtures. In June 2022, the club played against the Australia men's national soccer team in a competitive match, which ended 3–1 in favour of the Socceroos. The club also faced the United Arab Emirates national football team on two occasions, in June 2025 and again in April 2026.

== Academy and Player Development ==
The academy caters to players aged 4–23 across 23 teams and more than 83 nationalities, and is regarded as one of the most internationally diverse football programmes in the Middle East.

Gulf United is the #1 football scholarship provider in the MENA region, with over 100 scholars placed into university programmes in the United States and Canada. The club maintains partnerships with coaches and institutions across all scholarship divisions.

== Media and partnerships ==
In September 2021, Gulf United signed a deal with Adidas , making them the first grassroots football academy in the Middle East to partner with the brand. In November 2021, they built the region's first floating football pitch at the #NoFilterDXB event in Dubai Harbour, Dubai, which drew regional and global attention after featuring in a video by the Sidemen.

In December 2021, Zinedine Zidane visited Gulf United as part of the “Impossible Is Nothing” campaign.

As part of its partnership with Adidas, Gulf United has been involved in several global brand activations. The club activated the Adidas zone at the official FIFA World Cup Qatar 2022 BudX Fan Festival, which hosted up to 10,000 visitors per day and featured appearances from former players including Kaká, Iker Casillas and rappers Kano and Freek.The club also participated in the launch campaign for the Adidas “Al Rihla” match ball, which included a projection on the Burj Khalifa featuring Karim Benzema. Gulf United has further been involved in multiple Adidas boot launch campaigns and grassroots marketing initiatives linked to the brand.

Gulf United also maintains a partnership with Volkswagen, centred around grassroots football development. As part of this collaboration, the club launched the Volkswagen Cup, a community-focused football festival designed to prioritise participation and inclusivity over competition. First introduced in 2024 with approximately 700 participants, the event expanded significantly by 2026, attracting over 2,500 attendees and more than 97 teams, becoming one of the most prominent grassroots tournaments in the region.

The club has also developed international relationships with Arsenal F.C., including collaborative activities such as coaching sessions delivered by Arsenal staff and media engagements involving Arsenal players and Gulf United youth players.

In addition to its principal partners, Gulf United has held active sponsorship agreements with WOW Hydrate, Rasasi and Generaltec, supporting various club initiatives, activations and community programmes.

'We are Gulf United' is a YouTube docuseries which followed the club in their first season in the UAE Third Division season. Debuted on the 1st April 2022, the series has amassed over 2,000,000 views.

== Managerial history ==
First Team Managers
Dates	Names
2021–2023	(England) Steven Taylor
2023–2024	(Wales) Neil Taylor
2024–2025	(England) Richard Peniket
2025–2026	(Spain) David Iglesias
2026	(Germany) Ahmet Cebe
2026–	(Spain) Andrés Iniesta

== Squad ==
As of 15 September 2026

Note: Flags indicate national team as defined under FIFA eligibility rules; some limited exceptions apply. Players may hold more than one non-FIFA nationality.

No.	Pos.	Nation	Player
4	DF	CIV	Malick Atanda
6	DF	BUL	Faris Al-Jamali (^{U19})
7	MF	BRA	Fernando
8	MF	NED	Leroy Fer
10	MF	CMR	John Nchindo
11	MF	BRA	Weberty
12	MF	LBN	Alaa Mezher
13	MF	SSD	Manyumow Achol
14	FW	ESP	Pablo Gomez (^{U19})
15	DF	BFA	Dramane Coulibaly
17	MF	SYR	Qais Al-Safadi (^{U19})
18	MF	UAE	Rashed Oyoun
19	MF	FRA	Abdullah Bashammakh (^{U21})
20	MF	UAE	Tareq Ahmed
21	MF	SVK	Samuel El Khoury

No.	Pos.	Nation	Player
22	MF	UAE	Khalid Ghuloom
23	DF	UAE	Ahmed Abdulla
25	GK	UAE	Omar Abdulrahman
26	MF	UAE	Gabriel El Khoury
34	DF	NIG	Ayaan Shabbir Yusuf
45	DF	UAE	Ali Ibrahim
71	GK	BRA	Joaquim
74	FW	ZAM	Emmanuel Mutale (^{U21})
77	MF	MAR	El Mehdi El Khamlichi
88	MF	MOZ	Mario Zacarias (^{U21})
93	FW	COD	Benik Afobe
95	MF	SYR	Amar Roustm
98	FW	MOZ	Loló
99	FW	EGY	Hassan Abdelsalam
—	DF	ITA	Gabriel Santini

=== Out on loan ===
Note: Flags indicate national team as defined under FIFA eligibility rules; some limited exceptions apply. Players may hold more than one non-FIFA nationality.

No.	Pos.	Nation	Player
—	MF	CMR	Cédrick Nana (on loan to United)

== Honours ==
- UAE Second Division League
  - Champions (1): 2022–23
- UAE Third Division League
  - Champions (1): 2021–22

== See also ==
- List of football clubs in the United Arab Emirates
