= Waleed Al-Hammadi =

Comoran association football player

Personal information
- Date of birth: 27 June 2000 (age 26)
- Place of birth: United Arab Emirates
- Height: 1.75 m (5 ft 9 in)
- Position: Forward

Youth career
- –2018: Al-Dhafra

Senior career*
Years	Team	Apps	(Gls)
2018–2023	Al-Wasl	8	(1)
2022–2023	→ Dibba Al-Hisn (loan)		
- * Club domestic league appearances and goals as of 13 March 2020

Waleed Al-Hammadi (born 27 June 2000) is a Comorian footballer who plays as a forward.

== Personal life ==
Although born in the United Arab Emirates, he is not an Emirati citizen because of his bidoon condition and has received a Comorian passport instead, despite having no family connections to the East African nation. He is not eligible to play for the Comoros national team, according FIFA eligibility rules.

== Career statistics ==
As of 1 February 2020

Club	Season	League			Domestic Cup		League Cup		Continental		Other		Total	
Club	Season	Division	Apps	Goals	Apps	Goals	Apps	Goals	Apps	Goals	Apps	Goals	Apps	Goals
Al-Wasl	2018–19	UAE Pro League	1	0	0	0	0	0	0	0	0	0	1	0
Al-Wasl	2019–20	UAE Pro League	6	1	0	0	2 (Note: Appearances in the UAE League Cup)	0	0	0	0	0	8	1
Career total			7	1	0	0	2	0	0	0	0	0	9	1
