= Omar Al Khodaim =

Emirati footballer (born 1992)

Omar Al-Khodaim
Personal information
- Full name: Omar Ahmed Rashed Al-Khodaim
- Date of birth: 9 December 1992 (age 33)
- Place of birth: United Arab Emirates
- Height: 1.78 m (5 ft 10 in)
- Position: Left back

Team information
- Current team: Al-Ittifaq
- Number: 26

Youth career
- Dibba Al-Fujairah

Senior career*
Years	Team	Apps	(Gls)
2012–2017	Dibba Al-Fujairah	15	(1)
2017–2018	Emirates Club	1	(0)
2018–2024	Ittihad Kalba	59	(2)
2024–2025	Emirates		
2025–	Al-Ittifaq		
- * Club domestic league appearances and goals

Omar Al-Khodaim (Arabic:عمر الخديم) (born 9 December 1992) is an Emirati footballer who plays for Al-Ittifaq as a left back.
