= Wow Hydrate =

Sports drink

Wow Hydrate is a sugar-free sports drink that uses push-cap to preserve the ingredients within it. It gained significant media coverage from its partnership with heavyweight boxer Tyson Fury.

In March 2020 Fury announced that the company would donate thousands of its products to NHS workers during the COVID-19 pandemic. Fury's former trainer Ben Davison is also a partner of Wow Hydrate.

In February 2020 the company announced a two-year sponsorship deal with boxing promoters Matchroom. Chelsea and England footballer Ruben Loftus-Cheek, Crystal Palace player Patrick Van Aanholt and boxer Joe Cordina are also ambassadors for the brand. Club partners include Southampton FC, rugby league club Castleford Tigers and Essex County Cricket Club.

In January 2024, the brand announced a partnership with West Ham United Women's team.
