= Khalid Jalal =

Emirati footballer (born 1991)

Personal information
- Full name: Khalid Jalal Al Marzouqi
- Date of birth: 5 April 1991 (age 35)
- Place of birth: United Arab Emirates
- Height: 1.68 m (5 ft 6 in)
- Position: Midfielder

Team information
- Current team: Al-Ittifaq
- Number: 21

Youth career
- Al-Wahda

Senior career*
Years	Team	Apps	(Gls)
2010–2015	Al-Wahda	55	(0)
2015–2024	Al Nasr	76	(1)
2020–2021	→ Khor Fakkan (loan)	5	(0)
2024–2025	Khor Fakkan	2	(0)
2025	Dibba Al-Hisn	3	(0)
2025–	Al-Ittifaq	0	(0)
- * Club domestic league appearances and goals

Khalid Jalal (Arabic: خالد جلال; born 5 April 1991) is an Emirati footballer. He currently plays as a midfielder for Al-Ittifaq.
