= Tarik (footballer, born 2002) =

Brazilian footballer

Personal information
- Full name: Tarik Lucas Oliveira Novais
- Date of birth: 22 October 2002 (age 24)
- Height: 1.80 m (5 ft 11 in)
- Position: Forward

Youth career
- –2017: Grêmio Prudente
- 2017: Athletico Paranaense
- 2019–2020: Primavera
- 2020: Comercial-SP
- Al-Nasr

Senior career*
Years	Team	Apps	(Gls)
2021–2022	Al-Nasr	7	(0)
2021–2022	→ Al Dhaid (loan)	16	(5)
2022–2023	Al Rams	11	(3)
- * Club domestic league appearances and goals as of 17:17, 24 February 2021 (UTC)

Tarik Lucas Oliveira Novais (born 22 October 2002), commonly known as Tarik, is a Brazilian footballer who plays as a forward.

== Career statistics ==
=== Club ===
As of 24 February 2021.

Club	Season	League			Cup		Continental		Other		Total	
Club	Season	Division	Apps	Goals	Apps	Goals	Apps	Goals	Apps	Goals	Apps	Goals
Al-Nasr Dubai	2020–21	UAE Pro League	7	0	2 (Note: Appearances in the UAE League Cup)	0	0	0	0	0	9	0
Career total			7	0	2	0	0	0	0	0	9	0
