= Haithem Al-Matroushi =

Emirati footballer (born 1988)

Personal information
- Full name: Haithem Ali Khamis Al-Matroushi
- Date of birth: 1 October 1988 (age 38)
- Place of birth: United Arab Emirates
- Height: 1.69 m (5 ft 6 1/2 in)
- Position: Winger

Youth career
- Al Urooba

Senior career*
Years	Team	Apps	(Gls)
2008–2011	Al Urooba		
2011–2016	Emirates Club		
2016–2019	Al-Fujairah SC		
2019–2022	Al Bataeh		
2022	Dibba Al-Hisn		
- * Club domestic league appearances and goals

Haithem Al-Matroushi (Arabic:هيثم المطروشي ; born 1 October 1988) is an Emirati footballer. He plays as a winger.
