= Hassan Al-Moharrami =

Emirati footballer (born 1996)

Personal information
- Full name: Hasan Mohamed Hasan Ali Al-Moharrami
- Date of birth: 6 June 1996 (age 30)
- Place of birth: Abu Dhabi, United Arab Emirates
- Height: 1.82 m (6 ft 0 in)
- Position: Defender

Team information
- Current team: Baniyas
- Number: 5

Youth career
- –2016: Baniyas

Senior career*
Years	Team	Apps	(Gls)
2016–	Baniyas	69	(3)

International career^{‡}
2019–	United Arab Emirates	3	(0)
- * Club domestic league appearances and goals as of 16 November 2019 ‡ National team caps and goals as of 29 March 2021

Hasan Mohamed Hasan Ali Al-Moharrami (Arabic:حسن المحرمي) (born 6 June 1996) is an Emirati international footballer who plays as a defender for Emirati club Baniyas.
