= Al-Ittifaq FC (UAE) =

Emirati football club

Al-Ittifaq
- Full name: Al-Ittifaq Football Club
- Founded: 2020
- Ground: Al Aweer Stadium - Shabab Al Ahli
- Capacity: 4,260
- Owner: Pietro Laterza
- Head coach: Iñaki Beni
- League: UAE First Division
- 2024–25: 3rd
- Website: Official website

Al-Ittifaq FC (Arabic: نادي الإتفاق لكرة القدم) is an Emirati football club currently competing in the UAE First Division.

== Stadium ==
Al-Ittifaq plays its home matches for the season 2026-27 at Al Aweer Stadium - Shabab Al Ahli in Dubai, with a seating capacity of 4,260 seats.

== History ==
The club was founded in 2020 and began playing in the UAE Second Division. It earned promotion to the First Division In the 2024–25 season.

Under the ownership of Pietro Laterza, the Club sits alongside AC ChievoVerona of Serie D — one of Italian football’s most storied names — within a single ownership group built on the Tre Elle Group investments across real estate, hospitality, energy and sport.

Al-Ittifaq FC was founded in Dubai in 2020 with a clear purpose: to build a professional, ambitious football club. Operating as Nojoom Al-Ittifaq Sports Services LLC, the Club is a FIFA-approved organisation with deep roots in the UAE football ecosystem. Following promotion to the UAE First Division for the 2025-26 season, and with the arrival of new ownership, players, and coaching staff, the Club’s ambitions now reach all the way to the UAE Pro League.

This dual ownership was created deliberately, to foster genuine synergies between UAE and European football, both institutionally and in terms of concrete opportunities for players and staff. In practice, this relationship gives Al-Ittifaq access to Chievo Verona’s coaching methodology, scouting network and football operations expertise, while offering promising UAE-based talent a credible pathway into European football through training exposure, loan opportunities and shared recruitment intelligence. The two clubs already compete against each other on the pitch — including a pre-season friendly at Chievo’s Bottagisio training centre in Verona — and share players, staff and know-how across both footballing cultures. Over the life of this strategy, the Group relationship will be formalised into a structured framework covering joint scouting, coaching exchange, player pathways and commercial cooperation

== Current squad ==
As of UAE First Division League:

Note: Flags indicate national team as defined under FIFA eligibility rules; some limited exceptions apply. Players may hold more than one non-FIFA nationality.

No.	Pos.	Nation	Player
1	GK	UAE	Saoud Al-Hosani
2	DF	UAE	Hamdan Basweidan
3	DF	POR	Sana Gomes
4	DF	SRB	Andrej Krstic
6	MF	ESP	Álvaro Bravo
7	FW	POR	Nélson Pereira
8	MF	ITA	Daniele Baselli
9	FW	ITA	Mario Balotelli
10	MF	BRA	Douglas Costa
11	FW	UAE	Ali Eid
12	FW	EGY	Moatasem Yassin
13	GK	UAE	Marwan Al-Khodaim
14	FW	EGY	Hossam Ahmed
15	DF	UAE	Hamad Al-Marzouqi
16	MF	UAE	Yacoub Basweidan
17	MF	IRI	Ali Fardin
19	FW	UAE	Saeed Mohammed Al-Seraidi

No.	Pos.	Nation	Player
20	MF	GUI	Malick Sylla
21	MF	UAE	Khalid Jalal
24	MF	UAE	Eisa Almaazmi
25	MF	CIV	Arthur Desire
26	DF	UAE	Omar Al Khodaim
30	GK	PAK	Asif Khan
33	DF	ITA	Gianluca Santini
45	DF	UAE	Ali Abdulrasool
52	DF	UAE	Rashed Abbas
30	MF	PAK	Omer Nasim
44	DF	BRA	Anthony Lucas
60	MF	UAE	Ghanem Ahmad
71	MF	ESP	Pablo Casanova
80	MF	BRA	Rafael Lendecker
90	FW	ITA	Enock Barwuah
94	DF	EGY	Ahmed Loutfy
99	FW	BRA	Ruan Vitor
