= 2011–12 Al Ain FC season =

Al Ain
2011–12 season
- President: Mohammed Bin Zayed
- Manager: Cosmin Olăroiu
- Stadium: Tahnoun bin Mohammed
- Pro-League: 1st
- President's Cup: Quarter-finals
- League Cup: Group stage
- Top goalscorer: League: Asamoah Gyan (22); All: Asamoah Gyan (27)
- Highest home attendance: 15,187 vs Al Jazira (27 April 2012)
- Lowest home attendance: 1,856 vs Al Jazira (7 October 2011)
- Biggest win: 1–3 vs Al Jazira; 4–0 vs Emirates; 4–1 vs Ajman; 1–4 vs Sharjah; 3–0 vs Baniyas; 1–4 vs Emirates; 0–4 vs Ajman; 4–2 vs Al Jazira; 0–3 vs Emirates; 1–4 vs Al Wahda; 4–2 vs Emirates
- Biggest defeat: 4–0 vs Al Jazira
| Home colours | Away colours |
- All statistics correct as of 26 May 2012.

The 2011–12 season was Al Ain Football Club's 44th in existence and the club's 37th consecutive season in the top-level football league in the UAE.

Al Ain started the season with a new board of directors, after the former board of directors resigned following the 2010–11 season, one of the worst in the club's history.

== Season overview ==
=== Pre-season ===
On June 6, Al Ain announced officially Cosmin Olaroiu as the new manager for two seasons and released all the foreign players. After only one day of contracted with Cosmin Olaroiu, Al Ain reaching an agreement with AEK Athens for Argentine Ignacio Scocco according to reports a value of €3 million.

=== August ===
On 8 August, Al Hilal announced on his official website an agreement to loan Saudi international Forward Yasser Al Qahtani to Al Ain for one-year at a cost of €2.5 million.

On 13 August, At the opening of Al Ain Football International Championship, Al Ain S.C.C. launched the new logo for the club.

== Club ==
=== Technical staff ===
| Position | Staff |
|---|---|
| Head coach | (Romania) Cosmin Olăroiu |
| Assistant coach | (Romania) Cătălin Necula (Romania) Gabriel Caramarin (Italy) Massimo Pedrazzini |
| Translator | (Lebanon) Hussein Fakih |
| Fitness Coach | (Italy) Ferdinando Hippoliti |
| Goalkeeping coach | (Romania) Vasile Iordache (Iraq) Amer Abdul Wahab |
| Head of Performance Analysis | (England) Liam Weeks |
| Academy Director | (England) Wayne Harrison |
| Reserve team head coach | (United Arab Emirates) Ahmed Abdullah |
| Team Manager | (United Arab Emirates) Matar Obaid Al Sahbani |
| Physiotherapist | (Romania) Ion Buduga (Egypt) Abdelnasser Aljohny (Poland) Wiesław Sojka |
| Team Supervisor | (United Arab Emirates) Mohammed Obeid Hammad |
| Team Administrator | (United Arab Emirates) Nasser Al Junaibi |

Last updated: 6 June 2011
Source: AlKhaleej.ae, Al Ain FC

=== Board of directors ===
| Office | Name |
|---|---|
| President | Mohammed Bin Zayed Al Nahyan |
| First Deputy President | Hazza bin Zayed Al Nahyan |
| Second Deputy President | Tahnoon Bin Zayed Al Nahyan |
| Chairman of Board of Directors | Abdullah bin Mohammed bin Khaled Al Nahyan |
| Vice Chairman of Board of Directors | Rashid bin Mubarak Al Hajri |
| Supervising of Financial and Administrative affairs | Awad bin Hasoum Al Darmaki |
| Member of Board of Directors | Mohammed Abdullah bin Bdouh |
| Supervise of the football sector | Mohammed bin Obaid Al Dhaheri |

Last updated: 26 March 2011
Source: Al Ain FC, Al Ain FC

=== Other information ===
| Ground (capacity and dimensions) | Tahnoun bin Mohammed Stadium (10,000 / ) |
| Ground (capacity and dimensions) | Sheikh Khalifa International Stadium (16,000 / ) |

=== Kit ===
| Home | Away |

Source: Al Ain FC
Supplier: Kappa / Sponsor: Tamouh / Abu Dhabi National Hotels
Al Ain used this kit only for represent the new players and for three match in Al Ain Football International Championship.

| Home | Away |

Source: Al Ain FC
Supplier: Adidas / Sponsor: First Gulf Bank / Sorouh / Abu Dhabi National Hotels / Strata
On 16 September 2011, Al Ain wear this kit against Al Wahda in League Cup from the new supplier Adidas.

== Players ==
=== First Team ===
| No. | Position(s) | Nationality | Name | Since | Age | Signed from | Notes |
Goalkeepers
| 12 | GK | UAE | Waleed Salem | 2001 | 31 | Youth system | |
| 22 | GK | UAE | Mahmoud Al Mas | 2011 | 28 | (United Arab Emirates) Sharjah | |
Defenders
| 4 | DF | UAE | Musallem Fayez | 2007 | 25 | Youth system | |
| 5 | DF | UAE | Ismail Ahmed | 2008 | 28 | (Morocco) FUS de Rabat | |
| 14 | DF | UAE | Mohammed Fayez | 2010 | 22 | Youth system | |
| 19 | DF | UAE | Mohanad Salem | 2008 | 27 | (United Arab Emirates) Al Dhafra | |
| 21 | DF | UAE | Fawzi Fayez | 2007 | 24 | Youth system | |
| 33 | DF | UAE | Mohammed Al-Dhahri | 2010 | 21 | Youth system | |
| 44 | DF | UAE | Fares Jumaa | 2007 | 23 | Youth system | |
| 77 | DF | UAE | Hazza Salem | 2010 | 23 | Youth system | |
Midfielders
| 6 | MF | ROU | Mirel Rădoi | 2011 | 31 | (Saudi Arabia) Al Hilal | (3rd C) |
| 7 | MF | UAE | Ali Al-Wehaibi | 2001 | 28 | Youth system | (VC) |
| 8 | MF | UAE | Mohammed Al Saadi | 2011 | 29 | (United Arab Emirates) Al Dhafra | |
| 10 | MF | UAE | Omar Abdulrahman | 2008 | 20 | Youth system | |
| 13 | MF | UAE | Rami Yaslam | 2001 | 30 | Youth system | |
| 17 | MF | UAE | Ahmed Al Shamisi | 2009 | 24 | Youth system | |
| 20 | MF | UAE | Helal Saeed (C) | 2011 | 35 | (United Arab Emirates) Al Jazira | Originally from Youth system |
| 23 | MF | UAE | Shehab Ahmed | 2002 | 28 | Youth system | |
| 24 | MF | UAE | Abdullah Malallah | 2008 | 28 | (United Arab Emirates) Emirates | |
| 27 | MF | UAE | Salem Abdullah | 2006 | 25 | Youth system | |
Forwards
| 3 | FW | GHA | Asamoah Gyan | 2011 | 26 | (England) Sunderland | (on loan from Sunderland) |
| 9 | FW | KSA | Yasser Al-Qahtani | 2011 | 29 | (Saudi Arabia) Al Hilal | (on loan from Al Hilal) |
| 18 | FW | UAE | Mohamed Abdulrahman | 2008 | 23 | Youth system | |
| 28 | FW | UAE | Mohamed Naser | 2011 | 24 | (United Arab Emirates) Al Shabab | |
| 29 | FW | UAE | Mohamed Malallah | 2011 | 28 | (United Arab Emirates) Ittihad Kalba | |
| 32 | FW | ARG | Ignacio Scocco | 2011 | 26 | (Greece) AEK Athens | |

=== From Reserve and Youth Academy ===
| No. | Nat | Position | Player | Since |
|---|---|---|---|---|
| 15 | DF | UAE | Khaled Abdulrahman | 2010 |
| 26 | MF | UAE | Hamad Al Marri | 2010 |
| 28 | FW | UAE | Hamad Raqea | 2010 |
| 30 | GK | UAE | Abdullah Sultan | 2007 |
| 31 | MF | UAE | Haddaf Al Ameri | 2010 |
| 34 | MF | UAE | Sultan Nasser | 2010 |
| 36 | GK | UAE | Dawoud Sulaiman | 2010 |
| 37 | DF | UAE | Abdusalam Mohammed | 2012 |
| 38 | MF | UAE | Ahmed Sahel | 2010 |
| 70 | DF | UAE | Bandar Al-Ahbabi | 2010 |
| — | DF | UAE | Mohammed Ayed | 2009 |
| — | MF | UAE | Saqer Mohammed | 2012 |
| — | MF | UAE | Ibrahim Aziz | 2011 |
| — | FW | CIV | Jumaa Saeed | 2010 |

=== New contracts ===
| Date | Pos | No. | Player | Ref. | Notes |
|---|---|---|---|---|---|
| 24 May 2012 | DF | 44 | (United Arab Emirates) Fares Jumaa | | 30 June 2018 |
| 24 May 2012 | DF | 21 | (United Arab Emirates) Fawzi Fayez | | 30 June 2018 |
| 24 May 2012 | MF | 27 | (United Arab Emirates) Salem Abdullah | | 30 June 2018 |
| 24 May 2012 | DF | 4 | (United Arab Emirates) Musallem Fayez | | 30 June 2015 |
| 24 May 2012 | GK | 30 | (United Arab Emirates) Abdullah Sultan | | 30 June 2015 |
| 24 May 2012 | MF | 8 | (United Arab Emirates) Mohammed Al Saadi | | 30 June 2015 |
| 24 May 2012 | DF | — | (United Arab Emirates) Abdusalam Mohammed | | 30 June 2018 (first professional contract) |

== Transfers ==
=== In ===
| Date | Position | No. | Name | From | Type | Transfer window | Fee | Ref. |
|---|---|---|---|---|---|---|---|---|
| 7 June 2011 | FW | 32 | (Argentina) Ignacio Scocco | (Greece) AEK Athens | Transfer | Summer | €2.800,000 | |
| 9 June 2011 | FW | 28 | (United Arab Emirates) Mohamed Naser | (United Arab Emirates) Al Shabab | Transfer | Summer | Undisclosed | |
| 11 June 2011 | FW | 29 | (United Arab Emirates) Mohamed Malallah | (United Arab Emirates) Ittihad Kalba | Transfer | Summer | Undisclosed | |
| 24 June 2011 | MF | 6 | (Romania) Mirel Rădoi | (Saudi Arabia) Al Hilal | Transfer | Summer | €4,200,000 | |
| 12 July 2011 | GK | 22 | (United Arab Emirates) Mahmoud Al Mass | (United Arab Emirates) Sharjah | Transfer | Summer | €917,000 | |
| 13 July 2011 | DF | – | (United Arab Emirates) Adnan Bisho | (United Arab Emirates) Al Shaab | Transfer | Summer | Undisclosed | |
| 4 August 2011 | MF | 20 | (United Arab Emirates) Helal Saeed | (United Arab Emirates) Al Jazira | Transfer | Summer | Undisclosed | |
| 7 August 2011 | FW | 9 | (Saudi Arabia) Yasser Al-Qahtani | (Saudi Arabia) Al Hilal | Loan | Summer | €1,300,000 | |
| 11 August 2011 | MF | 8 | (United Arab Emirates) Mohammed Al Saadi | (United Arab Emirates) Al Dhafra | Transfer | Summer | Undisclosed | |
| 9 September 2011 | FW | 3 | (Ghana) Asamoah Gyan | (England) Sunderland | Loan | Summer | €7,000,000 | |
| Total | | | | | | | €16,217,000 | |

=== Out ===
| Date | Position | No. | Name | To | Type | Transfer window | Fee | Ref. |
|---|---|---|---|---|---|---|---|---|
| 26 June 2011 | MF | 38 | (Brazil) Elias Ribeiro | (Brazil) Figueirense | Transfer | Summer | Free | |
| 30 June 2011 | FW | — | (Argentina) José Sand | (Argentina) Tijuana | Transfer | Summer | €4,370,000 | |
| 30 June 2011 | MF | 6 | (Ivory Coast) Ibrahima Keita | (Kuwait) Qadsia | End of loan | Summer | Free | |
| 3 August 2011 | GK | 39 | (United Arab Emirates) Ismail Rabee | (United Arab Emirates) Al Shabab | Loan | Summer | Undisclosed | |
| 5 August 2011 | FW | 99 | (United Arab Emirates) Faisal Ali | (United Arab Emirates) Al Dhafra | Transfer | Summer | Free | |
| 25 August 2011 | MF | — | (Chile) Milovan Mirošević | (Chile) Universidad Católica | Transfer | Summer | Released | |
| 26 August 2011 | DF | — | (United Arab Emirates) Adnan Bisho | (United Arab Emirates) Al Shaab | Loan | Summer | Undisclosed | |
| 8 September 2011 | MF | 11 | (United Arab Emirates) Saif Mohammed | (United Arab Emirates) Al Shaab | Loan | Summer | Undisclosed | |
| 27 September 2011 | FW | 9 | (Romania) Valentin Badea | (Romania) Concordia Chiajna | Transfer | Summer | Free | |
| Total | | | | | | | €4,370,000 | |

== Pre-season and friendlies ==
| 12 July 2011 Friendly | Riccione (Italy) | 1–3 | (United Arab Emirates) Al Ain | Italy |
| 21:30 GMT+4 (UAE Time) | | Report; Details | | Stadium: Bruneck Stadium |

| 16 July 2011 Friendly | Palermo (Italy) | 2–0 | (United Arab Emirates) Al Ain | Brixen |
| 22:00 GMT+4 (UAE Time) | | Report; Details | | Stadium: Stadio Comunale; Referee: Zuliani |

| 23 July 2011 Friendly | Leogang (Austria) | 0–11 | (United Arab Emirates) Al Ain | Austria |
| | | | S. Mohammed; M. Malallah; M. Naser; Al Ahbabi; Raqea; Shehab; (o.g.); (o.g.); (o.g.) |

| 24 July 2011 Friendly | Wigan Athletic (England) | 0–0 | (United Arab Emirates) Al Ain | Bischofshofen |
| 21:00 GMT+4 (UAE Time) | | Report | | Attendance: 418 |

| 26 July 2011 Friendly | MTK Budapest (Hungary) | 2–0 | (United Arab Emirates) Al Ain | Austria |
| 20:00 GMT+4 (UAE Time) | | Report |

| 28 July 2011 Friendly | PAS Giannina (Greece) | 3–1 | (United Arab Emirates) Al Ain | Austria |
| 20:30 GMT+4 (UAE Time) | Tzimopoulos 27'; Tzanis 66'; Becerra 68' | Report; Details | Scocco 51' (pen.) |

| 13 August 2011 AFIC | Al Ain (United Arab Emirates) | 6–1 | (Bahrain) Al Riffa | Al Ain |
| 22:30 | Yasser (yellow card) 14' (goal) 32' (pen.); Mohamed. M 37'; Haddaf 66'; Helal. S 70'; Salem. A 73'; R. Yaslam 80' | Report | 17' Hussein; (red card) 60' Abubakar | Stadium: Khalifa Bin Zyed; Referee: Ali Hamad |

| 16 August 2011 AFIC | Al Ain (United Arab Emirates) | 0–0 | (Oman) Al Suwaiq | Al Ain |
| 21:30 | | Report | | Stadium: Khalifa Bin Zyed; Referee: Ammar Al Junaibi |

| 19 August 2011 AFIC | Al Ain (United Arab Emirates) | 1–1 | (Saudi Arabia) Al Shabab | Al Ain |
| 23:30 | Musallem. F (yellow card) 49'; Radoi (red card) 55'; Yasser 58'; Azoz (yellow card) 87' | Report | 22' (o.g.) Ismail; (yellow card) 54' Hassan; (red card) 55' Abdulmalk; (yellow card) 57' Marcelo; (yellow card) 61' Fernando; (yellow card) 73' Waleed; (yellow card) 77' Ahmed | Stadium: Khalifa Bin Zyed; Referee: Mohammed Abdulkarim |

| 23 August 2011 Friendly | Al Ain (United Arab Emirates) | 2–0 | (United Arab Emirates) Dubai | Al Ain |
| 22:00 GMT+4 (UAE Time) | M. Nasser 54' (yellow card) 62'; Raqea 75' | Report | (yellow card) 20' Feindouno; (yellow card) 44' J.Abdulla; (yellow card) 53' Camara; (yellow card) 69' A.Salim | Stadium: Khalifa Bin Zyed; Referee: Sultan Mohammed Saleh |

| 5 September 2011 Friendly | Alkharitiyat (Qatar) | 0–1 | (United Arab Emirates) Al Ain | Doha |
| 19:45 | Vivian (red card) 26' | Report | 27' (pen.) Radoi; (yellow card) 48' S. Rabie | Stadium: Suheim Bin Hamad; Referee: Abdul Rahman Jassim |

| 8 September 2011 Friendly | Al Sadd (Qatar) | 1–0 | (United Arab Emirates) Al Ain | Doha |
| 19:45 | Al-Hamad 65' | Report | | Stadium: Jassim Bin Hamad; Referee: Mohammed Taha |

| 18 September 2011 Friendly | Al Ain (United Arab Emirates) | 3–1 | (Oman) Al Shabab | Al Ain |
| 21:30 GMT+4 (UAE Time) | Mohammed .S 40'; Shehab 43' (pen.); Ayed (yellow card) 50'; S. Rabie (yellow card) 59'; I. Aziz 83' | Report | 2' Rabia; (yellow card) 80' Dew | Stadium: Khalifa Bin Zyed; Referee: Issa Khalifa |

== Competitions ==
=== Overview ===
| Competition | First match | Last match | Starting round | Final position | Record | | | | | | | |
| Competition | First match | Last match | Starting round | Final position | Pld | W | D | L | GF | GA | GD | Win % |
|---|---|---|---|---|---|---|---|---|---|---|---|---|
| Pro League | 16 October 2011 | 26 May 2012 | Matchday 1 | Winners | 22 | 17 | 4 | 1 | 52 | 16 | +36 | 77.27 |
| League Cup | 16 September 2011 | 2 March 2012 | Group stage | Group stage | 10 | 5 | 2 | 3 | 17 | 13 | +4 | 50.00 |
| President's Cup | 18 December 2011 | 10 January 2012 | Round of 16 | Quarter-finals | 2 | 1 | 0 | 1 | 4 | 3 | +1 | 50.00 |
| Total | | | | | 34 | 23 | 6 | 5 | 73 | 32 | +41 | 67.65 |

Last updated: 26 May 2012
Source: Competitions

=== UAE Pro-League ===
==== League table ====
| Pos | Team | Pld | W | D | L | GF | GA | GD | Pts | Qualification or relegation |
|---|---|---|---|---|---|---|---|---|---|---|
| 1 | Al Ain (C) | 22 | 17 | 4 | 1 | 52 | 16 | +36 | 55 | 2013 AFC Champions League Group stage |
| 2 | Al Nasr | 22 | 11 | 8 | 3 | 49 | 33 | +16 | 41 | 2013 AFC Champions League Qualifying play-off |
| 3 | Al Shabab | 22 | 10 | 8 | 4 | 39 | 27 | +12 | 38 | 2013 AFC Champions League Qualifying play-off |
| 4 | Al Jazira | 22 | 11 | 2 | 9 | 47 | 38 | +9 | 35 | 2013 AFC Champions League Group stage (Note: Al Jazira secured qualification for the 2013 AFC Champions League through winning the 2011–12 UAE President's Cup) |
| 5 | Al Ahli | 22 | 10 | 4 | 8 | 45 | 42 | +3 | 34 | |

Updated to match(es) played on 27 May 2012. Source: Standings
Rules for classification: 1) points; 2) goal difference; 3) number of goals scored.
(C) Champions

==== Results summary ====
| Overall | | | | | | | | Home | | | | | | Away | | | | | |
| Pld | W | D | L | GF | GA | GD | Pts | W | D | L | GF | GA | GD | W | D | L | GF | GA | GD |
|---|---|---|---|---|---|---|---|---|---|---|---|---|---|---|---|---|---|---|---|
| 22 | 17 | 4 | 1 | 52 | 16 | +36 | 55 | 12 | 0 | 0 | 30 | 4 | +26 | 5 | 4 | 1 | 22 | 12 | +10 |

Last updated: 26 May 2012.
Source: Competitive Matches

==== Results by round ====
| Round | 1 | 2 | 3 | 4 | 5 | 6 | 7 | 8 | 9 | 10 | 11 | 12 | 13 | 14 | 15 | 16 | 17 | 18 | 19 | 20 | 21 | 22 |
|---|---|---|---|---|---|---|---|---|---|---|---|---|---|---|---|---|---|---|---|---|---|---|
| Ground | H | A | H | A | H | A | H | A | H | A | H | A | H | A | H | A | H | A | H | A | H | A |
| Result | W | D | W | W | W | D | W | W | W | D | W | L | W | W | W | W | W | D | W | W | W | W |
| Position | 3 | 3 | 3 | 1 | 3 | 3 | 2 | 1 | 1 | 1 | 1 | 1 | 1 | 1 | 1 | 1 | 1 | 1 | 1 | 1 | 1 | 1 |

Updated to match(es) played on 26 May 2012. Source: Pro-League
A = Away; H = Home; W = Win; D = Draw; L = Loss

==== Matches ====
| 16 October 2011 1 | Al Ain | 2–0 | Al Nasr | Al Ain |
| 18:40 GMT+4 (UAE Time) | I. Ahmed 13'; Al Qahtani 32' (yellow card) 56' | Summary; Report | Lima (yellow card) 14'; T. Hamad (yellow card) 40'; Bangoura (red card) 75'; A. Moosa (yellow card) 75' | Stadium: Tahnoun bin Mohammed; Attendance: 5,322; Referee: Mohamed Al-Zarouni |

| 21 October 2011 2 | Al Wahda | 2–2 | Al Ain | Abu Dhabi |
| 20:00 GMT+4 (UAE Time) | Al Kamali 30'; Al Shehhi 42'; K. Jalal (yellow card) 83'; Eisa .A (yellow card) 86'; Baiano (yellow card) 87' | Summary; Report | Gyan 27'; Al Wehaibi (yellow card) 29'; R. Yaslam (yellow card) 85'; I. Ahmed 90+3' | Stadium: Al Nahyan; Attendance: 8,882; Referee: Ali Hamad |

| 29 October 2011 3 | Al Ain | 2–1 | Dubai | Al Ain |
| 20:00 GMT+4 (UAE Time) | F. Fayez (yellow card) 8'; Scocco (yellow card) 19'; Gyan 20', 23'; M. Fayez (yellow card) 38'; W. Salem (yellow card) 41'; M. Abdulrahman (yellow card) 67'; S. Abdullah (yellow card) 90+3' | Summary; Report | Daoudi 33'; Feindouno (yellow card) 43' | Stadium: Tahnoun bin Mohammed; Attendance: 4,845; Referee: Hamad Al Shaikh |

| 26 November 2011 5 | Al Ain | 2–1 | Sharjah | Al Ain |
| 20:00 GMT+4 (UAE Time) | Scocco 6'; Al Wehaibi 74' | Summary; Report | Y. Mustafa (yellow card) 42'; Marcelinho 48'; H. Ahmed (yellow card) 52'; Al-Maghni (yellow card) 60'; Fahad. M (yellow card) 76' | Stadium: Tahnoun bin Mohammed; Attendance: 4,887; Referee: Hamad Al Shaikh |

| 4 December 2011 6 | Baniyas | 2–2 | Al Ain | Abu Dhabi |
| 16:50 GMT+4 (UAE Time) | Senghor 6' (yellow card) 6'; A. Abdulrahman (yellow card) 14'; F. Bashir 43'; M. Khalaf (yellow card) 47'; N. Mubarak (yellow card) 86'; Thamer. M (yellow card) 88' | Summary; Report | Gyan 12', 49' (pen.); Scocco (yellow card) 28'; F. Jumaa (yellow card) 52' | Stadium: Baniyas; Attendance: 3,037; Referee: Mohammed Abdullah |

| 9 December 2011 7 | Al Ain | 2–0 | Al Wasl | Al Ain |
| 20:00 GMT+4 (UAE Time) | Gyan 12' (pen.); Scocco 38' | Summary; Report | M. Nasser (yellow card) 45'; S. Saeed (yellow card) 56'; Rashed. E (yellow card) 75' | Stadium: Tahnoun bin Mohammed; Attendance: 7,432; Referee: Hamad Al Shaikh |

| 13 December 2011 4 | Al Ahli | 0–2 | Al Ain | Dubai |
| 20:00 GMT+4 (UAE Time) | Grafite (yellow card) 41'; M. Qassim (yellow card) 76' | Summary; Report | Gyan 20'; K. Abdulrahman (yellow card) 23'; Scocco 46'; M. Salem (yellow card) 62'; Musallem. F (yellow card) 90+1' | Stadium: Rashid; Attendance: 5,120; Referee: Ammar Al-Jeneibi |

| 22 December 2011 8 | Al Jazira | 1–3 | Al Ain | Abu Dhabi |
| 20:00 GMT+4 (UAE Time) | J. Abdullah 49' | Summary; Report | Gyan 4', 90+3'; F. Jumaa (yellow card) 32'; F. Fayez 60'; W. Salem (yellow card) 66'; Scocco (yellow card) 81' | Stadium: Mohammed Bin Zayed; Attendance: 21,455; Referee: Ammar Al-Jeneibi |

| 30 December 2011 9 | Al Ain | 4–0 | Emirates | Al Ain |
| 16:55 GMT+4 (UAE Time) | Gyan 6' (pen.); K. Abdulrahman (yellow card) 14'; A. Fayez 44'; M. Naser 49'; Al Saadi 67' | Summary; Report | Shamarikh (yellow card) 37'; Malek (yellow card) 42'; M. Ali (yellow card) 66'; A. Ali (yellow card) 86' | Stadium: Tahnoun bin Mohammed; Attendance: 6,471; Referee: Mohammed Abdullah |

| 4 January 2012 10 | Al Shabab | 1–1 | Al Ain | Dubai |
| 20:00 GMT+4 (UAE Time) | E. Dhahi (yellow card) 5'; A. Al Blooshi (yellow card) 42'; César 57' (pen.); W. Abbas (yellow card) 90+3' | Summary; Report | Scocco 6' (pen.); M. Salem (yellow card) 9'; F. Jumaa (yellow card) 10'; F. Fayez (yellow card) 56' | Stadium: Maktoum bin Rashid Al Maktoum; Attendance: 7,623; Referee: Ammar Al-Jeneibi |

| 14 January 2012 11 | Al Ain | 4–1 | Ajman | Al Ain |
| 18:15 GMT+4 (UAE Time) | M. Naser 56', 84'; Scocco 82' (pen.), 90'; M. Abdulrahman (yellow card) 85' | Summary; Report | Touré 33'; W. Ahmed (yellow card) 59' | Stadium: Tahnoun bin Mohammed; Attendance: 5,281; Referee: Abdullah Al Ajel |

| 23 January 2012 12 | Al Nasr | 2–0 | Al Ain | Dubai |
| 20:00 GMT+4 (UAE Time) | Bresciano 5' (yellow card) 15'; Younes. A 90+2'; Diané (yellow card) 90+2' | Summary; Report | H. Salem (yellow card) 2'; Al Qahtani (yellow card) 49'; W. Salem (yellow card) 90+2' | Stadium: Al-Maktoum; Attendance: 6,427; Referee: Mohammed Abdullah |

| 8 February 2012 13 | Al Ain | 1–0 | Al Wahda | Al Ain |
| 20:00 GMT+4 (UAE Time) | Al Qahtani 11'; F. Jumaa (yellow card) 82' | Summary; Report | Yaqoub (yellow card) 12'; Ismail. M (yellow card) 47'; Mahmoud. K (yellow card) 73' | Stadium: Tahnoun bin Mohammed; Attendance: 10,322; Referee: Mohamed Al-Zarouni |

| 15 February 2012 14 | Dubai | 0–2 | Al Ain | Dubai |
| 17:25 GMT+4 (UAE Time) | A. Abdulqader (yellow card) 37'; Hassan. M (yellow card) 61'; Camara (yellow card) 66'; Y. Al Hammadi (red card) 77' | Summary; Report | Scocco 20'; Gyan 62' | Stadium: Police Officers Club; Attendance: 2,150; Referee: Hamad Al Shaikh |

| 16 March 2012 15 | Al Ain | 1–0 | Al Ahli | Al Ain |
| 20:30 GMT+4 (UAE Time) | Gyan 65' (pen.); F. Jumaa (yellow card) 85'; H. Saeed (yellow card) 90+2' | Summary; Report | M. Hassan (yellow card) 14'; A. Khamis (yellow card) 45'; Y. Mohamad (yellow card) 45+2'; Haikal (yellow card) 61'; Emaná (yellow card) 83' | Stadium: Tahnoun bin Mohammed; Attendance: 7,821; Referee: Mohamed Al-Zarouni |

| 24 March 2012 16 | Sharjah | 1–4 | Al Ain | Sharjah |
| 20:30 GMT+4 (UAE Time) | Al Sharif (yellow card) 7'; Al Maghni (red card) 20'; Y. Saeed 57' | Summary; Report | Gyan 8' (pen.); F. Jumaa (yellow card) 15'; Al Qahtani 58', 67'; A. Fayez 90+3' | Stadium: Sharjah; Attendance: 3,704; Referee: Mohammed Abdullah |

| 30 March 2012 17 | Al Ain | 3–0 | Baniyas | Al Ain |
| 17:50 GMT+4 (UAE Time) | Al Wehaibi 26'; Gyan (yellow card) 50' (goal) 55', 84'; I. Ahmed (yellow card) 56' | Summary; Report | I. Saeed (yellow card) 12'; M. Jaber (yellow card) 50' | Stadium: Tahnoun bin Mohammed; Attendance: 6,502; Referee: Ali Hamad |

| 14 April 2012 18 | Al Wasl | 2–2 | Al Ain | Dubai |
| 20:30 GMT+4 (UAE Time) | T. Hassan (red card) 83'; Khalatbari 65' (yellow card) 78'; Olivera 67' (yellow card) 67'; K. Abdullah (yellow card) 69' | Summary; Report | H. Saeed (yellow card) 19'; Gyan 36', 84' (pen.); Scocco (yellow card) 53' | Stadium: Zabeel; Attendance: 10,492; Referee: Mohammed Abdullah |

| 27 April 2012 19 | Al Ain | 2–0 | Al Jazira | Al Ain |
| 21:00 GMT+4 (UAE Time) | Al Qahtani 9', 21' (yellow card) 64'; M. Salem (yellow card) 40' | Summary; Report | A. Abbas (yellow card) 23'; K. Sebil (yellow card) 69'; Baré (yellow card) 90+4' | Stadium: Tahnoun bin Mohammed; Attendance: 15,187; Referee: Ali Hamad |

| 6 May 2012 20 | Emirates | 1–4 | Al Ain | Ras al-Khaimah |
| 19:35 GMT+4 (UAE Time) | A. Rabee (yellow card) 26'; Geynrikh 30'; Hasanov (yellow card) 90+1' | Summary; Report | Gyan 7', 23'; Rădoi (red card) 11'; O. Abdulrahman 44'; M. Abdulrahman (yellow card) 45+1'; Scocco 54' | Stadium: Emirates Club; Attendance: 3,752; Referee: Mohammed Abdullah |

| 11 May 2012 21 | Al Ain | 3–1 | Al Shabab | Al Ain |
| 19:40 GMT+4 (UAE Time) | Al Qahtani 38'; Scocco (yellow card) 45'; I. Ahmed 53'; Gyan 87' | Summary; Report | A. Al Blooshi 17' (pen.); H. Ibrahim (yellow card) 22'; Kieza (yellow card) 46'; E. Mohammed (yellow card) 55'; A. Darwish (yellow card) 71' | Stadium: Tahnoun bin Mohammed; Attendance: 3,486; Referee: Fahad Al-Kassar |

| 26 May 2012 22 | Al Ain | 4–0 | Ajman | Al Ain |
| 18:15 GMT+4 (UAE Time) | Rădoi (yellow card) 20'; Scocco 32'; Gyan 63', 80'; O. Abdulrahman 67'; F. Jumaa (yellow card) 90+4' | Summary; Report | Adel. M (yellow card) 87' | Stadium: Tahnoun bin Mohammed; Attendance: 10,432; Referee: Mohamed Al-Zarouni |

=== Etisalat Cup ===
==== Group A ====
| Team | Pld | W | D | L | GF | GA | GD | Pts |
|---|---|---|---|---|---|---|---|---|
| Al Jazira | 10 | 7 | 1 | 2 | 28 | 13 | +15 | 22 |
| Al Wasl | 10 | 6 | 0 | 4 | 18 | 18 | 0 | 18 |
| Al Ain | 10 | 5 | 2 | 3 | 17 | 13 | +4 | 17 |
| Dubai | 10 | 5 | 1 | 4 | 18 | 13 | +5 | 16 |
| Al Wahda | 10 | 3 | 0 | 7 | 13 | 20 | −7 | 9 |
| Emirates | 10 | 1 | 2 | 7 | 7 | 24 | −17 | 5 |

Source: UAEProLeague

| 16 September 2011 1 | Al Ain | 1–2 | Al Wahda | Dubai |
| 20:30 GMT+4 (UAE Time) | Rădoi (yellow card) 35'; I. Ahmed 76'; R. Yaslam (yellow card) 89' | Report | Hugo 20' (pen.), 50'; Al Hosani (yellow card) 40' | Stadium: Rashid; Attendance: 3,869; Referee: Abdullah Al Ajel |

| 23 September 2011 2 | Dubai | 1–2 | Al Ain | Dubai |
| 17:30 GMT+4 (UAE Time) | Camara 10'; I. Ahmed (yellow card) 41'; A. Malallah (red card) 90+3' | Report | Scocco 4'; Al-Qahtani 56' | Stadium: Police Officers Club; Attendance: 1,950; Referee: Mohamed Al-Zarouni |

| 1 October 2011 3 | Emirates | 1–1 | Al Ain | Ras al-Khaimah |
| 17:15 GMT+4 (UAE Time) | A. Ali (yellow card) 17'; Keita 77'; Shamarikh (yellow card) 90+2' | Report | Gyan 25' (pen.); I. Ahmed (yellow card) 82'; M. Fayez (yellow card) 90+4' | Stadium: Emirates Club; Attendance: 841; Referee: Abdulwahid Qhater |

| 7 October 2011 4 | Al Ain | 4–2 | Al Jazira | Al Ain |
| 21:00 GMT+4 (UAE Time) | Rădoi 19' (pen.), 70' (pen.), 83'; Ayed (yellow card) 51'; Al Saadi 74' (red card) 85'; H. Saeed (yellow card) 89' | Report | A. Qasim (yellow card) 22'; Oliveira 32'; Delgado 53' (yellow card) 69'; S. Obaid (red card) 56'; K. Esmaeel (yellow card) 65' | Stadium: Tahnoun bin Mohammed; Attendance: 1,856; Referee: Mohammed Abdullah |

| 12 November 2011 5 | Al Wasl | 1–0 | Al Ain | Dubai |
| 20:00 GMT+4 (UAE Time) | Porta (yellow card) 20'; Olivera 65'; H. Ali (yellow card) 71'; Al Mesmari (yellow card) 90+1' | Report | H. Saeed (yellow card) 48'; Al-Dhahri (yellow card) 56' | Stadium: Zabeel; Attendance: 2,021; Referee: Abdullah Al Ajel |

| 19 November 2011 6 | Al Ain | 1–0 | Al Wasl | Al Ain |
| 20:00 GMT+4 (UAE Time) | Scocco (yellow card) 14'; Musallem. F (red card) 22'; Gyan (yellow card) 23'; Al-Qahtani 29' (yellow card) 39'; Al Shamisi (yellow card) 90+4' | Report | Fadel (yellow card) 10'; Issa (yellow card) 28'; Yasser (yellow card) 40'; Puch (red card) 64' | Stadium: Tahnoun bin Mohammed; Attendance: 5,380; Referee: Ammar Al-Jeneibi |

| 27 January 2012 7 | Al Jazira | 4–0 | Al Ain | Abu Dhabi |
| 20:00 GMT+4 (UAE Time) | S. Masoud (yellow card) 7'; Diaky 14'; A. Jumaa (red card) 33'; Baré 63', 90+1'; Oliveira 67'; Al-Senani (yellow card) 73'; M. Barqesh (yellow card) 75' | Report | | Stadium: Mohammed Bin Zayed; Attendance: 3,754; Referee: Abdulwahid Qhater |

| 3 February 2012 8 | Al Ain | 3–0 | Emirates | Al Ain |
| 18:50 GMT+4 (UAE Time) | Scocco 13'; Al-Qahtani 36' (pen.), 65'; Ayed (yellow card) 56' | Report | Saif. M (yellow card) 44'; A. Al Shehhi (yellow card) 81' | Stadium: Tahnoun bin Mohammed; Attendance: 4,133; Referee: Yaqoub Al Hammadi |

| 23 February 2012 9 | Al Ain | 1–1 | Dubai | Al Ain |
| 19:05 GMT+4 (UAE Time) | H. Saeed (yellow card) 20'; Al-Qahtani 28'; M. Malallah (yellow card) 33' | Report | Hassan. M 6'; Y. Al Hammadi (yellow card) 52' | Stadium: Tahnoun bin Mohammed; Attendance: 2,204; Referee: Adel Al Naqbi |

| 2 March 2012 10 | Al Wahda | 1–4 | Al Ain | Abu Dhabi |
| 19:05 GMT+4 (UAE Time) | A. Alawi (yellow card) 4'; Eisa. A (yellow card) 67'; Al-Harthi (yellow card) 71'; Al Mansoori 77'; H. Rashed (yellow card) 90+4' | Report | Al-Ahbabi (yellow card) 36'; K. Abdulrahman (yellow card) 48'; Al Saadi 65', 89'; Gyan 72' (pen.), 90+1'; W. Salem (yellow card) 76' | Stadium: Al Nahyan; Attendance: 2,312; Referee: Yaqoub Al Hammadi |

=== President's Cup ===
| 18 December 2011 Round of 16 | Al Ain | 4–2 | Emirates | Dubai |
| 16:45 GMT+4 (UAE Time) | Gyan 17', 45+1'; M. Abdulrahman (yellow card) 19' (goal) 42'; M. Salem 54' | Report; Details | Moutaouali 4'; Akarandut (yellow card) 20'; A. Ali (yellow card) 36'; M. Ali (yellow card) 52'; F. Jumaa 90+2' (o.g.) | Stadium: Rashid; Referee: Ibrahim Al Muhairi |

| 10 January 2012 Quarter-finals | Baniyas | 1–0 (a.e.t.) | Al Ain | Dubai |
| 20:15 GMT+4 (UAE Time) | Fawzi (yellow card) 2'; Msarri (yellow card) 46'; Y. Jaber (yellow card) 84'; Al Ghaferi (yellow card) 105'; Senghor 113' (yellow card) 114' | Report; Details | | Stadium: Al Maktoum; Referee: Fahad Al-Kassar |

== Statistics ==
=== Squad appearances and goals ===
Last updated on 26 May 2012.

| No. | Pos | Nat | Player | Total | | Pro-League | | President's Cup | | League Cup | |
| No. | Pos | Nat | Player | Apps | Goals | Apps | Goals | Apps | Goals | Apps | Goals |
Goalkeepers
| 22 | GK | (United Arab Emirates) UAE | Mahmoud Al Mas | 0 | 0 | 0 | 0 | 0 | 0 | 0 | 0 |
| 12 | GK | (United Arab Emirates) UAE | Waleed Salem | 20 | 0 | 11 | 0 | 1 | 0 | 8 | 0 |
| 30 | GK | (United Arab Emirates) UAE | Abdullah Sultan | 0 | 0 | 0 | 0 | 0 | 0 | 0 | 0 |
| 36 | GK | (United Arab Emirates) UAE | Dawoud Sulaiman | 15 | 0 | 11 | 0 | 2 | 0 | 2 | 0 |
Defenders
| 2 | DF | (United Arab Emirates) UAE | Mohammed Ayed | 5 | 0 | 0 | 0 | 0 | 0 | 5 | 0 |
| 4 | DF | (United Arab Emirates) UAE | Musallem Fayez | 17 | 0 | 9 | 0 | 1 | 0 | 7 | 0 |
| 5 | DF | (United Arab Emirates) UAE | Ismail Ahmed | 14 | 4 | 8 | 3 | 0 | 0 | 6 | 1 |
| 14 | DF | (United Arab Emirates) UAE | Mohammed Fayez | 5 | 0 | 3 | 0 | 0 | 0 | 2 | 0 |
| 15 | DF | (United Arab Emirates) UAE | Khaled Abdulrahman | 24 | 0 | 19 | 0 | 2 | 0 | 3 | 0 |
| 19 | DF | (United Arab Emirates) UAE | Mohanad Salem | 20 | 1 | 16 | 0 | 2 | 1 | 2 | 0 |
| 21 | DF | (United Arab Emirates) UAE | Fawzi Fayez | 22 | 1 | 14 | 1 | 2 | 0 | 6 | 0 |
| 33 | DF | (United Arab Emirates) UAE | Mohammed Al-Dhahri | 3 | 0 | 0 | 0 | 0 | 0 | 3 | 0 |
| 35 | DF | (United Arab Emirates) UAE | Hazza Salem | 6 | 0 | 2 | 0 | 0 | 0 | 4 | 0 |
| 44 | DF | (United Arab Emirates) UAE | Fares Jumaa | 24 | 0 | 21 | 0 | 1 | 0 | 2 | 0 |
Midfielders
| 6 | MF | (Romania) ROU | Mirel Rădoi | 29 | 3 | 19 | 0 | 1 | 0 | 9 | 3 |
| 7 | MF | (United Arab Emirates) UAE | Ali Al-Wehaibi | 17 | 2 | 16 | 2 | 0 | 0 | 1 | 0 |
| 8 | MF | (United Arab Emirates) UAE | Mohammed Al Saadi | 16 | 4 | 10 | 1 | 1 | 0 | 5 | 3 |
| 10 | MF | (United Arab Emirates) UAE | Omar Abdulrahman | 9 | 2 | 7 | 2 | 0 | 0 | 2 | 0 |
| 13 | MF | (United Arab Emirates) UAE | Rami Yaslam | 16 | 0 | 7 | 0 | 2 | 0 | 7 | 0 |
| 18 | MF | (United Arab Emirates) UAE | Abdullah Malallah | 1 | 0 | 1 | 0 | 0 | 0 | 0 | 0 |
| 17 | MF | (United Arab Emirates) UAE | Bandar Al-Ahbabi | 2 | 0 | 0 | 0 | 0 | 0 | 2 | 0 |
| 20 | MF | (United Arab Emirates) UAE | Helal Saeed | 26 | 0 | 19 | 0 | 1 | 0 | 6 | 0 |
| 23 | MF | (United Arab Emirates) UAE | Shehab Ahmed | 7 | 0 | 2 | 0 | 0 | 0 | 5 | 0 |
| 17→25 | MF | (United Arab Emirates) UAE | Ahmed Al Shamisi | 4 | 0 | 0 | 0 | 1 | 0 | 3 | 0 |
| 27 | MF | (United Arab Emirates) UAE | Salem Abdullah | 16 | 0 | 8 | 0 | 1 | 0 | 7 | 0 |
| 31 | MF | (United Arab Emirates) UAE | Haddaf Al Ameri | 2 | 0 | 0 | 0 | 0 | 0 | 2 | 0 |
| 34 | MF | (United Arab Emirates) UAE | Sultan Nasser | 0 | 0 | 0 | 0 | 0 | 0 | 0 | 0 |
Forwards
| 3 | FW | (Ghana) GHA | Asamoah Gyan | 24 | 27 | 18 | 22 | 1 | 2 | 5 | 3 |
| 9 | FW | (Saudi Arabia) KSA | Yasser Al-Qahtani | 21 | 12 | 15 | 7 | 0 | 0 | 6 | 5 |
| 11 | FW | (United Arab Emirates) UAE | Abdulaziz Fayez | 28 | 2 | 19 | 2 | 2 | 0 | 7 | 0 |
| 16 | FW | (United Arab Emirates) UAE | Mohamed Abdulrahman | 21 | 1 | 18 | 0 | 2 | 1 | 1 | 0 |
| 28 | FW | (United Arab Emirates) UAE | Mohamed Naser | 12 | 3 | 6 | 3 | 2 | 0 | 4 | 0 |
| 29 | FW | (United Arab Emirates) UAE | Mohamed Malallah | 19 | 0 | 9 | 0 | 1 | 0 | 9 | 0 |
| 32 | FW | (Argentina) ARG | Ignacio Scocco | 27 | 11 | 19 | 9 | 2 | 0 | 6 | 2 |
| 40 | FW | (United Arab Emirates) UAE | Hamad Raqea | 0 | 0 | 0 | 0 | 0 | 0 | 0 | 0 |
Players who have made an appearance this season but have left the club

=== Disciplinary record ===
| N | P | Nat. | Name | Pro-League | | | League Cup | | | President's Cup | | | Total | | | Notes |
| N | P | Nat. | Name | Yellow card | Second yellow card | Red card | Yellow card | Second yellow card | Red card | Yellow card | Second yellow card | Red card | Yellow card | Second yellow card | Red card | Notes |
| 2 | DF | (United Arab Emirates) | Mohammed Ayed | | | | 2 | | | | | | 2 | | | |
| 3 | FW | (Ghana) | Asamoah Gyan | 1 | | | 1 | | | | | | 2 | | | |
| 4 | DF | (United Arab Emirates) | Musallem Fayez | 1 | | | | | 1 | | | | 1 | | 1 | |
| 5 | DF | (United Arab Emirates) | Ismail Ahmed | 1 | | | 1 | | | | | | 2 | | | |
| 6 | MF | (Romania) | Mirel Rădoi | 1 | | 1 | 1 | | | | | | 2 | | 1 | |
| 7 | MF | (United Arab Emirates) | Ali Al-Wehaibi | 1 | | | | | | | | | 1 | | | |
| 8 | MF | (United Arab Emirates) | Mohammed Al Saadi | | | | | | 1 | | | | | | 1 | |
| 9 | FW | (Saudi Arabia) | Yasser Al-Qahtani | 3 | | | 1 | | | | | | 4 | | | |
| 12 | GK | (United Arab Emirates) | Waleed Salem | 3 | | | 1 | | | | | | 4 | | | |
| 13 | MF | (United Arab Emirates) | Rami Yaslam | 1 | | | 1 | | | | | | 2 | | | |
| 14 | DF | (United Arab Emirates) | Mohammed Fayez | 1 | | | 1 | | | | | | 2 | | | |
| 15 | DF | (United Arab Emirates) | Khaled Abdulrahman | 2 | | | 1 | | | | | | 3 | | | |
| 16 | FW | (United Arab Emirates) | Mohamed Abdulrahman | 3 | | | | | | 1 | | | 4 | | | |
| 17 | MF | (United Arab Emirates) | Bandar Al-Ahbabi | | | | 1 | | | | | | 1 | | | |
| 19 | DF | (United Arab Emirates) | Mohanad Salem | 3 | | | | | | | | | 3 | | | |
| 20 | MF | (United Arab Emirates) | Helal Saeed | 2 | | | 3 | | | | | | 5 | | | |
| 21 | DF | (United Arab Emirates) | Fawzi Fayez | 2 | | | | | | | | | 2 | | | |
| 25 | MF | (United Arab Emirates) | Ahmed Al Shamisi | | | | 1 | | | | | | 1 | | | |
| 27 | MF | (United Arab Emirates) | Salem Abdullah | 1 | | | | | | | | | 1 | | | |
| 29 | FW | (United Arab Emirates) | Mohamed Malallah | | | | 1 | | | | | | 1 | | | |
| 32 | FW | (Argentina) | Ignacio Scocco | 5 | | | 1 | | | | | | 6 | | | |
| 33 | DF | (United Arab Emirates) | Mohammed Al-Dhahri | | | | 1 | | | | | | 1 | | | |
| 44 | DF | (United Arab Emirates) | Fares Jumaa | 7 | | | | | | | | | 7 | | | |
| 77 | DF | (United Arab Emirates) | Hazza Salem | 1 | | | | | | | | | 1 | | | |

Last updated: 26 May 2012
Source: Competitive matches
Only competitive matches
(yellow card) = Number of bookings; (second yellow card) = Number of sending offs after a second yellow card; (red card) = Number of sending offs by a direct red card.

=== Assists ===
| Rnk | No. | Pos | Player | League | League Cup | President's Cup | Champions League | Super Cup | Total |
|---|---|---|---|---|---|---|---|---|---|
| 1 | 6 | MF | (Romania) Mirel Rădoi | | 4 | | | | 4 |
| 2 | 32 | FW | (Argentina) Ignacio Scocco | | 2 | | | | 2 |
| — | 11 | FW | (United Arab Emirates) Abdulaziz Fayez | | 2 | | | | 2 |
| — | 44 | DF | (United Arab Emirates) Fares Jumaa | | 1 | 1 | | | 2 |
| 5 | 16 | MF | (United Arab Emirates) Mohamed Abdulrahman | | | 1 | | | 1 |
| — | 3 | FW | (Ghana) Asamoah Gyan | | | 1 | | | 1 |
| — | 19 | DF | (United Arab Emirates) Mohanad Salem | | | 1 | | | 1 |
| — | 9 | FW | (Saudi Arabia) Yasser Al-Qahtani | | 1 | | | | 1 |
| — | 13 | MF | (United Arab Emirates) Rami Yaslam | | 1 | | | | 1 |
| TOTALS | | | | | 11 | 4 | | | 15 |

Last updated: 26 May 2012
Source: Competitive matches

=== Goalscorers ===
| Rnk | No. | Pos | Player | League | League Cup | President's Cup | Total |
|---|---|---|---|---|---|---|---|
| 1 | 3 | FW | (Ghana) Asamoah Gyan | 22 | 3 | 2 | 27 |
| 2 | 9 | FW | (Saudi Arabia) Yasser Al-Qahtani | 7 | 5 | | 12 |
| 3 | 32 | FW | (Argentina) Ignacio Scocco | 9 | 2 | | 11 |
| 4 | 5 | DF | (United Arab Emirates) Ismail Ahmed | 3 | 1 | | 4 |
| — | 8 | MF | (United Arab Emirates) Mohammed Al Saadi | 1 | 3 | | 4 |
| 6 | 6 | MF | (Romania) Mirel Radoi | | 3 | | 3 |
| — | 28 | FW | (United Arab Emirates) Mohamed Naser | 3 | | | 3 |
| 8 | 10 | MF | (United Arab Emirates) Omar Abdulrahman | 2 | | | 2 |
| — | 11 | FW | (United Arab Emirates) Abdulaziz Fayez | 2 | | | 2 |
| — | 7 | MF | (United Arab Emirates) Ali Al-Wehaibi | 2 | | | 2 |
| 11 | 19 | DF | (United Arab Emirates) Mohanad Salem | | | 1 | 1 |
| — | 21 | DF | (United Arab Emirates) Fawzi Fayez | 1 | | | 1 |
| — | 16 | FW | (United Arab Emirates) Mohamed Abdulrahman | | | 1 | 1 |
| Own Goals | | | | | | 1 | 1 |
| TOTALS | | | | 52 | 17 | 5 | 74 |

Last updated: 26 May 2012
Source: Competitive matches

=== Hat-tricks ===
| Player | Against | Result | Date | Competition |
|---|---|---|---|---|
| (Romania) Mirel Rădoi | (United Arab Emirates) Al Dhafra | 4–2 (H) | 7 October 2011 | League Cup |

(H) – Home; (A) – Away

=== Clean sheets ===
| Rank | Player | Clean sheets |
|---|---|---|
| 1 | (United Arab Emirates) Dawoud Sulaiman | 7 |
| 2 | (United Arab Emirates) Waleed Salem | 5 |
| TOTALS | | 12 |

Last updated: 26 May 2012
Source: Competitive matches

== Awards ==
| Award | Winner |
|---|---|
| UAE Pro League Top Scorer | (Ghana) Asamoah Gyan |
