= 2009–10 UAE President's Cup =

Association football tournament

The 2009–10 UAE President's Cup was the 34th season of the UAE President's Cup, the premier knockout tournament for association football clubs in the United Arab Emirates. The winner were guaranteed a place in the 2011 AFC Champions League.

The format has changed from previous editions, from a straight knockout tournament to a Group Phase tournament starting from Round 1.

Emirates Club were the winners.

== Round One ==
=== Groups ===
Four groups containing three or four teams

Group A	Group B	Group C	Group D
Al Arabi; Dubai; Al Oruba; Al Rams	Al Shaab; Dubba Al Hunsun; Al Jazira Al Hamra; Masafi	Ittihad Kalba; Al Fujirah; Dabba Al Fujirah; Ras Al Khaimah	Hatta; Al-Thaid; Al Khaleej

=== Group A ===
Team	Pld	W	D	L	GF	GA	GD	Pts
(United Arab Emirates) Al Oruba	6	4	1	1	18	7	+11	13
(United Arab Emirates) Al Arabi	6	3	2	1	20	9	+11	11
(United Arab Emirates) Dubai	6	2	1	3	18	9	+9	7
(United Arab Emirates) Al Rams	6	0	0	6	1	32	−31	0

August 27, 2009

Dubai	2–1	Al Oruba

Al Rams	1–4	Al Arabi

September 4, 2009

Al Oruba	1–0	Al Rams

Al Arabi	2–2	Dubai

September 10, 2009

Al Arabi	2–3	Al Oruba

Al Rams	0–5	Dubai

September 23, 2009

Al Oruba	3–1	Dubai

Al Arabi	7–0	Al Rams

September 29, 2009

Dubai	1–3	Al Arabi

Al Rams	0–8	Al Oruba

October 9, 2009

Dubai	7–0	Al Rams

Al Arabi	2–2	Al Oruba

=== Group B ===
Team	Pld	W	D	L	GF	GA	GD	Pts
(United Arab Emirates) Al Shaab	6	5	1	0	27	4	+23	16
(United Arab Emirates) Dubba Al Husun	6	3	1	2	16	12	+4	10
(United Arab Emirates) Masafi	6	3	0	3	12	20	−8	9
(United Arab Emirates) Al Jazira Al Hamra	6	0	0	6	4	23	−19	0

August 28, 2009

Dubba Al Hunsun	6–0	Masafi

Al Jazira Al Hamran	0–6	Al Shaab

September 3, 2009

Masafi	3–0	Al Jazira Al Hamran

Al Shaab	4–0	Dubba Al Hunsun

September 11, 2009

Masafi	2–5	Al Shaab

Al Jazira Al Hamran	2–3	Dubba Al Hunsun

September 24, 2009

Masafi	4–2	Dubba Al Hunsun

Al Shaab	5–0	Al Jazira Al Hamran

September 30, 2009

Al Jazira Al Hamran	1–2	Masafi

Dubba Al Hunsun	1–1	Al Shaab

October 8, 2009

Al Shaab	6–1	Masafi

Dubba Al Hunsun	4–1	Al Jazira Al Hamran

=== Group C ===
Team	Pld	W	D	L	GF	GA	GD	Pts
(United Arab Emirates) Ittihad Kalba	6	4	2	0	18	7	+11	14
(United Arab Emirates) Ras Al Kamirah	6	3	0	3	8	12	−4	9
(United Arab Emirates) Al Fujirah	6	2	1	3	10	12	−2	7
(United Arab Emirates) Dabba Al Fujirah	6	1	1	4	8	13	−5	4

August 27, 2009

Ittihad Kalba	4–0	Ras Al Kamirah

Al Fujirah	2–1	Dabba Al Fujirah

September 4, 2009

Ras Al Kamirah	2–0	Al Fujirah

Dabba Al Fujirah	1–1	Ittihad Kalba

September 10, 2009

Al Fujirah	3–3	Ittihad Kalba

Ras Al Kamirah	3–1	Dabba Al Fujirah

September 18, 2009

Dabba Al Fujirah	1–2	Al Fujirah

September 25, 2009

Ras Al Kamirah	0–3	Ittihad Kalba

September 29, 2009

Al Fujirah	1–2	Ras Al Kamirah

Ittihad Kalba	4–1	Dabba Al Fujirah

October 9, 2009

Dabba Al Fujirah	3–1	Ras Al Kamirah

Ittihad Kalba	3–2	Al Fujirah

=== Group D ===
Team	Pld	W	D	L	GF	GA	GD	Pts
(United Arab Emirates) Al Khaleej	4	4	0	0	12	3	+9	12
(United Arab Emirates) Hatta	4	1	1	2	7	6	+1	4
(United Arab Emirates) Al-Thaid	4	0	1	3	4	14	−10	1

August 28, 2009

Hatta	1–1	Al-Thaid

September 3, 2009

Al-Thaid	1–3	Al Khaleej

September 11, 2009

Al Khaleej	2–1	Hatta

September 18, 2009

Al-Thaid	1–5	Hatta

September 18, 2009

Al Khaleej	5–1	Al-Thaid

October 8, 2009

Hatta	0–2	Al Khaleej

== Round of 16 ==
16 teams play a knockout tie. 8 clubs advance to the next round. Ties played over 23 & 24 November 2009

Tie no	Home team	Score	Away team
1	Al Khaleej	1 - 3	Al-Shabbab ACD
2	Al Dhafra	2 - 1	Al Oruba
3	Al-Ahli	4 - 2	Al-Sharjah
4	Al-Shaab	0 - 3	Al-Jazira Club
5	Al-Wahda	4 - 0	Bani Yas Club
6	Ittihad Kalba	2 - 5	Al-Nasr
7	Al-Wasl	1 - 2	Emirates Club
8	Ajman Club	0 - 0	Al-Ain
Ajman Club won 4 - 3 on penalties

== Quarter finals ==
8 teams play a knockout tie. 4 clubs advance to the next round. Ties played over 25 & 26 December 2009

Kickoff times are in GMT.

25 December 2009
12:50

Emirates Club	1 – 0	Ajman Club
Husain 14'	Report

Khalid Bin Mohammed Stadium, Sharjah

25 December 2009
15:50

Al-Wahda	5 – 3 (a.e.t.)	Al-Nasr
Baiano 51'; Baiano 63'; Baiano 69'; Saeed 102'; Pinga 108'	Report	Tenorio 29' (pen.); Tenorio 78' (pen.); Malallah 90'

Sheikh Khalifa International Stadium, Al Ain

26 December 2009
12:55

Al Dhafra	0 – 3	Al-Jazira Club
J.Khater (red card) 91'	Report	Oliveira 14'; Diaky 89'; Diaky 90+5'

Al-Nahyan Stadium, Abu Dhabi

26 December 2009
15:55

Al-Ahli	0 – 2	Al-Shabbab ACD
	Report	Abdullah 25'; Renato 88'

Al-Maktoum Stadium, Dubai

== Semi finals ==
4 teams play a knockout tie. 2 clubs advance to the final. Ties played over 22 & 23 January 2010

Kickoff times are in GMT.

22 January 2010
13:10

Emirates Club	1 – 0	Al-Wahda
Daoudi 79' (pen.)	Report

Sheikh Zayed Stadium, Abu Dhabi
Referee: Hamad Al Sheikh (UAE)

23 January 2010
13:10

Al-Jazira	0 – 0 (a.e.t.)	Al-Shabbab ACD
	Report
Penalties
Khater (penalty missed); Abdulrahman (penalty missed); Mabkhout (penalty missed)	0 – 3	(penalty scored) Pedrao; (penalty scored) Nasser; (penalty scored) Abdullah

Sheikh Zayed Stadium, Abu Dhabi
Referee: Farid Ali (UAE)

== Final ==
Kickoff times are in GMT.

19 April 2010

Emirates Club	3–1	Al-Shabbab ACD
Daoudi 48', 77'; Kerkar 90+3'		Renato 11'

Sheikh Zayed Stadium, Abu Dhabi

UAE President Cup
2009–10 Winners

1st title

== Top goalscorers ==
Goalscorers	Goals	Team
(France) La rent	11	Ittihad Kalba
(Ivory Coast) Kouassi	9	Al-Shaab
(Iran) Behshad	7	Al Oruba
(United Arab Emirates) (Ivory Coast) Diaky	7	Al-Jazira
(United Arab Emirates) Abdullah	6	Al Fujirah
(Morocco) Chaher	6	Al Arabi
(Brazil) Marcio	5	Dubai
(Brazil) Joiri	5	Al Oruba
