= Omar Abdulrahman =

Emirati footballer (born 1991)

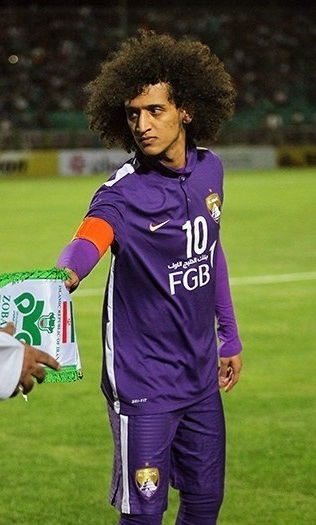
- Abdulrahman with Al Ain in 2016

Personal information
- Full name: Omar Abdulrahman Ahmed Al Raaki Al Amoudi
- Date of birth: 20 September 1991 (age 35)
- Place of birth: Riyadh, Saudi Arabia
- Height: 1.73 m (5 ft 8 in)
- Positions: Attacking midfielder; winger

Youth career
- 2000–2005: Al Hilal
- 2006–2008: Al Ain

Senior career*
Years	Team	Apps	(Gls)
2008–2019	Al Ain	142	(38)
2018–2019	→ Al Hilal (loan)	5	(1)
2019–2021	Al Jazira	21	(3)
2021–2023	Shabab Al-Ahli	5	(1)
2023–2024	Al Wasl	2	(0)

International career^{‡}
2007–2010	United Arab Emirates U20	4	(1)
2010–2012	United Arab Emirates U23	15	(1)
2011–2022	United Arab Emirates	74	(11)
Medal record
Representing United Arab Emirates
Men's Football
AFC Asian Cup
Third place	2015
Asian Games
Silver medal – second place	2010
Arabian Gulf Cup
Winner	2013
Runner-up	2018
Third place	2014
- * Club domestic league appearances and goals as of 10:31, 9 July 2024 (UTC) ‡ National team caps and goals as of 23:53, 17 December 2025

Omar Abdulrahman Ahmed Al Raaki Al Amoudi (Arabic: عُمَر عَبْد الرَّحْمٰن أَحْمَد الرَّاقِي الْعَمُودِيّ; born 20 September 1991) is a former professional footballer who played as an attacking midfielder or a winger. Born in Saudi Arabia, he represented the United Arab Emirates at international levels.

Coming through the youth system, Abdulrahman made his senior debut for Al Ain in the 2008–09 season. In his first season, he won the Etisalat Cup, President's Cup and Super Cup. Despite suffering a cruciate ligament injury in the following season which sidelined him for over six months, he became a first team regular and helped his club to avoid relegation in the 2010–11 season. He finished the season with 11 goals in 29 appearances, and was voted the most promising player of the year. In the 2011–12 season, Abdulrahman suffered the same injury again and was out for six months, he returned from the injury to see his club crowned champions of the league. After a two-week trial with Manchester City, he returned to Al Ain to become a key player in the 2012–13 season and was voted Emirati Player of the Year, as his side achieved the 2012 Super Cup and league title.

ESPN FC ranked Abdulrahman first in the Top ten Asian players of 2012. In 2013, Abdulrahman was listed by FIFA in the most promising future stars in Asia. Abdulrahman was ranked thirty-nine on the Goal 50 list for the best 50 players of the 2012–13 season.

== Early life ==
Omar Abdulrahman was born in Riyadh, Saudi Arabia to Yemeni parents, growing up there in a working-class environment. His father Abdulrahman Ahmed was a former player, he has two older sisters and three older brothers, Ahmad, Khaled and Mohammed. He is from the Al-Amoudi family, a Hadhrami Mashaikh family descending from 13th century Sufi saint, Sa'eed ibn Isa Al-Amoudi. He spent sometimes playing soccer in Riyadh neighborhoods.

He drew attention from scout Abdulrahman Eissa who saw him by chance at Al Malaz yard near Prince Faisal bin Fahd Stadium and asked about the club that he played for. The answer was that he was not playing for any club and also did not hold Saudi nationality. After Abdulrahman Eissa began to contact him and his brother, he then began participating in tournaments and courses alongside Yahya Al-Shehri.

In 2000, he went on a trial with Al Hilal who were interested in signing him. However, as full Saudi nationality was only offered to him and not his entire family, his father rejected the offer.

Then a call came to Abdulrahman Eissa's friend Ahmed Al Garoon from Honorary member of Al Ain, Nasser bin Thaloub who was searching for young talented players. Abdulrahman Eissa told him about Abdulrahman's talent and his brothers Mohammed and Khalid. He asked for their passports and they joined the external Al Ain camp in Germany. Al Ain agreed to grant the Emirati passport to his whole family who then moved to the United Arab Emirates. Abdulrahman joined the club with two of his brothers and enrolled in Al Ain's youth academy.

== Club career ==
=== Al Ain ===
Abdulrahman joined Al Ain Academy in 2008, and has played for Al Ain's under-16, under-17, under-18, under-19 and reserve team. He was promoted to the first team by coach Winfried Schäfer after he saw him at the Al Ain International Under-17 Football tournament in 2009. His official debut with the first team was against Al Ahli on 24 January 2009 in Etisalat Cup. Despite being promoted to the first team, Abdulrahman continued to play for the reserve team. His last match with the reserve team was against Al Nasr on 24 January 2012. He scored 6 goals and Assists 3 in 10 matches over 5 seasons with the reserve.

==== 2008–09 season ====
Abdulrahman made his official debut for the first team on 24 January 2009 at the age of 17 years, in the Etisalat Cup against Al Ahli when he came on as a substitute for Ahmed Khamis in the 77th minute. On 27 March 2009, two months after his debut, he replaced Faisal Ali in the 70th minute in the second leg of the Etisalat Cup semi-final against Al Jazira. Abdulrahman shot the ball on the goal but hit the crossbar, before Dias converted the rebound scoring the only goal in the match. On 3 April 2009, Abdulrahman won his first club honour when Al Ain defeated Al Wahda in the Etisalat Cup final. A week later, on 13 April, he won his second club honour, President's Cup in a 1–0 win against Al Shabab. On 18 April 2009, Abdulrahman made his league debut in a 5–0 victory over Ajman. On 11 May 2009, he scored his first Pro-League goal in a 2–2 draw with Al Ahli, to become the youngest player to score a goal in this season. Followed with another goal against Al Wasl on 15 May, scored the 101st goal for Al Ain in the two clubs matches history. On 24 May 2009, he scored his third league goal in a 2–0 win over Al Shaab.

==== 2009–10 season ====
Before the start of the season, on 26 July 2009, Abdulrahman suffered a cruciate ligament injury during a friendly match against FC Lausanne-Sport with UAE U-20. On 26 February, Abdulrahman played in his first game back from injury in the under-19 youth league against Bani Yas and it ended 4–2 in Al Ain's favor. On 19 March, in a 2–3 win against Al Dhafra, he scored his first goal of the season in the reserve league and helped in two. On 23 April, he scored and helped in another in a 5–0 victory over Al Wasl. Abdulrahman made his Champions League debut in a 2–0 home victory over Sepahan Isfahan. He scored his first Pro-league goals for the season in a 5–3 win over Emirates. On 15 May, he helped the Al Ain reserves win the Reserve League by scoring a brace and helped in another in a 2–6 win against Al Sharjah. He finished the season scoring 5 goals in 7 matches with the under-19, reserve, and first team.

==== 2010–11 season ====
In this season, Abdulrahman became a first team regular, after the departure of Valdivia from the club, he inherited the number 10 jersey. On 28 August 2010, Abdulrahman scored with a free kick and assisted teammate Jose Sand in a 4–3 win at Dubai in his first start of the season. On 20 September 2010, during the second round of the President's Cup, Abdulrahman scored his first goal in the cup in a 5–0 victory over Masfout. He scored a goal from a penalty in a 1–2 defeat to Al Ahli on 30 September, In the match against Al Wasl on 27 October 2010, he assisted another goal for teammate Mohanad Salem to put his team 2–1 ahead but the match ended in a 2–2 draw. In a 1–4 defeat to Ittihad on 30 September he also assisted teammate Faris. He once again assisted teammate Jose Sand in a 1–1 draw against Al Shabab on 23 December 2010. On 12 May 2011, Al Ain announced an extension to Abdulrahman's contract until 2015.

On 1 June 2011, he led his team to beat Al Jazira 4–1 by scoring two goals and assisting the fourth. On 12 June 2011, Abdulrahman was named the Pro-League's most promising player of the Year for the second time by Emirati newspaper Al Ittihad. Abdulrahman ended the season with 11 goals and 8 assists in 29 matches across all competition.

==== 2011–12 season ====
On 15 January, during a match in the Etisalat Reserve League against Ajman, Abdulrahman returned from an injury suffered during the summer camp for the national team which kept him out for six months. This was the second injury he suffered to his cruciate ligament in less than two years. In the following match with the reserve team against Al Nasr he assisted the first goal in a 3–1 win. On 27 January, Abdulrahman played his first match with the first team after his return from injury in a match that Al Ain loss 4–0 from Al Jazira, coming on as a substitute for Mohamed Malallah in the 59th minute. On 24 March, he assist two goals in a 1–4 win against Al Sharjah. On 6 May, he scored the third goal in a 1–4 win against Emirates. In the final league match of the season and crowning the league against Ajman, he assisted two goals and scored another of 0–4.

==== Manchester City trial ====
On 6 August 2012, Abdulrahman confirmed on Twitter that he would join English side Manchester City on trial. After arriving to Manchester, he immediately joined the team training. The trial lasted for two weeks, he played friendly matches and the report was positive but the deal broke down due to work permit and national team rank issues. On 9 March 2013, Al Ain coach Cosmin Olaroiu stated "City offered him a four-year deal after training with them last summer, and that he would take them up on a second offer." On 11 March, the club's academy chief Brian Marwood, confirmed that they were still interested in Abdulrahman.

==== 2012–13 season ====
After he returned from a trial with Manchester City, Al Ain confirmed that Abdulrahman would stay with the team for the 2012–13 season. Abdulrahman started the season by lifting UAE Super Cup with Al Ain, after a 5–4 penalty shoot-out win against Al Jazira, where he missed a penalty kick and was named Man of the Match. In the first league match, Abdulrahman provided an assist for new teammate Ekoko to score his first league goal in a 3–6 defeat to Al Ahli on 23 September. He assisted the third goal for teammate defender Fawzi Fayez in a 1–4 win over Ajman. Abdulrahman scored his first Pro-League goal for this season on 15 October, and assisted two goals in a 7–0 victory over Al Dhafra. In a fourth round match and win 5–1 over Dibba Al Fujairah, Abdulrahman assisted Asamoah Gyan to score the fourth goal. Abdulrahman scored his second goal in a 5–0 win over Al Wasl on 3 November. He assisted Ismail Ahmed the third goal of a corner kick in a 2–3 win over Al Shabab. Abdulrahman scored a brace and assisted Mohamed Ahmed to score the first goal, in a 6–0 victory over Ittihad Kalba. Abdulrahman scored another brace in a 2–5 win over Dubai on 23 November. He was named player of the month for November by Al Ain fans. On 16 December against Al Nasr, he provided an assist for Gyan to score the second goal which gave his side a 0–2 away victory.

On 26 January, in Al Ain's first league match of 2013, Abdulrahman scored from a penalty kick and provided an assist for Brosque in a 4–0 against Ajman. In a match that Al Ain loss 1–0 from Dibba Al Fujairah, Abdulrahman came on as a substitute for the first time in this season for Hilal Saeed in the 63rd minute. On 24 February, Abdulrahman confirmed to the media that he received a loan offer from Benfica for a one-year contract. However, Al Ain turned down the offer and pointed for his desire to remain the player for this season. On 27 February, Abdulrahman played against his former club Al-Hilal that he trained with as a youngster in the Champions League Group stage and scored the equaliser 1–1 and provided an assist for Brosque in a 3–1 home victory.

On 7 March, Abdulrahman helped Al Ain in a 2–1 win over Al Wasl, by provided an assist for Gyan to score the tie 1–1 and also played a part in the second goal.

On 3 April, Abdulrahman returned from injury sustained against Esteghlal, in a 2–1 win over Al Rayyan, where he assisted on two goal. On 9 April 2013, in a match against Al Rayyan, where he assisted Al Ain's only goal in the match, Abdulrahman wore the captain's armband after Hilal Saeed was substituted, then he give it to his teammate Fares Juma. On 14 April, Abdulrahman assisted another two goals in a 3–1 win over Ittihad Kalba. On 18 April 2013, Abdulrahman captained Al Ain for the first time in his career in a home win over Dubai and won the league title. On 5 May, against Al Ahli in the President's Cup semi-final, Abdulrahman was sent off after two yellow cards in the 90+6 minute for infringement against the referee's assistant and dissent against referee Ammar Al Junaibi. On 16 May, Abdulrahman won Al Hadath Al Riyadi Young Arab Player of the Year. On 26 May, he added both the Pro-League Emirati Player of the Year and Fans’ Player of the Year.

==== 2013–14 season ====
On 23 July, Al Ain confirmed that the club received offers for Abdulrahman being discussed. On 4 August, Al Ain received an official trial letter offer from Arsenal for Abdulrahman. However, it was rejected by Chairman of Al Ain Board Sheikh Abdullah, said that the club would only listen to serious offers and that Abdulrahman was a national treasure. On 30 August 2013, Al Ain lost the 2013 UAE Super Cup to Al Ahli 2–3 on penalties after a 0–0 draw in regular time. Abdulrahman missed the second penalty kick, saved by goalkeeper Majed Nasser. He provided first two assists of this season in a 4–3 loss from Al Dhafra. On 20 October, Abdulrahman provided three assists against Dubai in a 5–2 win. On 31 October, Abdulrahman scored his first goal of this season from a long shot and assisted Fares to score the third goal in a 3–2 victory over Al Nasr. On 29 November, Abdulrahman made four goals of Al Ain 5–2 victory against Emirates. On 5 December, Abdulrahman assisted Asamoah Gyan to score the equaliser in a 1–1 draw with Baniyas. He provided another assist for Gyan in a 2–1 loss against Al Jazira.

On 3 January 2014, Abdulrahman provided two assists against Al Wasl in a 3–0 win. On 13 January, he assisted teammate, Alex Brosque with his lobbed pass for narrow the lead, Abdulrahman missed the second penalty shootout in a 2–2 (8–9 on penalties) win over Al Wasl in the round of 16 of the President's Cup. On 24 January, he assisted from the corner the only side goal and the first goal at Al Ain new stadium Hazza Bin Zayed in a 1–1 draw with Al Dhafra. On 30 January, In the semi-finals of the President's Cup, Al Ain reached the final after beating Al Nasr, Abdulrahman suffered an injury before the match but was in starting lineup. It was later announced that he would be out for a month due to a groin injury. On 7 February, Daily Mirror reported that Galatasaray, Liverpool joined number of teams that were interested in signing Abdulrahman.

On 13 March 2014, Abdulrahman returned from injury coming on as a second-half substitute in a 2–1 away loss against Ittihad in group stage match of the AFC Champions League. On 18 March, following his first match after the injury, Abdulrahman came on to the pitch as a second-half substitute for his brother Mohamed Abdulrahman in the 54th minute, he provided the cross for Gyan to score the third goal in the 3–1 win over Tractor Sazi. On 23 March, Abdulrahman played his 100th official match with Al Ain against Al Ahli.

On 1 April, Abdulrahman made two goals in a 2–2 draw with Tractor Sazi. On 2 April, Abdulrahman has been banned for two games in league following his attack on Haitham Ali without a ball against Emirates. In a 5–0 win over Lekhwiya on 15 April, Abdulrahman assisted Gyan the fifth goal. After return from two-match ban on 27 April, Abdulrahman made two goal in a 1–3 win over Al Sharjah. On 18 May, Abdulrahman led Al Ain to win in the final of the President's Cup against rivals Al Ahli, set up the winning goal for Asamoah Gyan, giving Al Ain his sixth title.

Abdulrahman finished his season with 2 goals and 23 assists in all competitions make him the top assist maker in Arabian Gulf League for the season with a 17 assists. Abdulrahman was nominated for the Best Emirati Player of the Year and selected in Best XI in AGL Awards.

==== 2014–15 season ====
Abdulrahman led Al Ain to the Champions League semi-finals, where he set-up Gyan's goal in a 2–0 home win over Al-Ittihad in the first leg on 19 August, and scored in a 1–3 win in the return leg on 26 August. On 16 September, he assisted Myung-joo in a 2–1 home win in the second leg against Al-Hilal, Despite this win, Al Ain did not progress to the final after a 3–0 loss in the first-leg.

On 24 September, Abdulrahman sustained an injury in Al Ain's match against Ajman, But he played nevertheless against Al-Hilal and reinjured; tests later confirmed that he suffered a stretched knee ligament injury, ruling him out for two to three weeks. On 28 October, he returns from injury to assist two goals in Al Ain's 2–1 win over Al Ahli in the U21 League. On 23 November, Abdulrahman suffered another injury against Saudi Arabia in the 22nd Arabian Gulf Cup, leaving him side-lined for six weeks.

During the second half of the season, Abdulrahman suffered a third-degree muscle strain on 4 February 2015, which kept him sidelined for two to three weeks. On 20 February, Abdulrahman extended his contract with Al-Ain until 2018 after signing a contract that makes him the highest paid Arabian player in the middle east with certain terms in the region, reported to be worth £2.99 million. on 28 February, he finally returned to the pitch, making a substitute appearance in Al Ain's 3–0 home win over Al Fujairah in the League. He scored his second goal this season in a 2–1 win against Al Jazira on 8 March. Abdulrahman reinjured again on 13 March. A week after his return, he assisted two goals in his participation with U21 team against Emirates. He scored and assisted another in a 4–0 home win over Ittihad Kalba, to lead Al Ain achieve their league title after Al Jazira defeat on 17 April. He scored another goal on 6 May, as Al Ain defeated Naft Tehran 3–0. On 14 May, he provided an assist to Gyan’s to score his four goal in the President's Cup Round of 16 against Dibba. Despite assisting an injury-time 3–3 equaliser to Rashed Eisa, Al Ain were subsequently defeated by Al Ahli 3–3 on away goals in the Round of 16 of the Champions League.

=== Al Hilal ===
==== 2018–19 season ====
In August 2018, Abdulrahman joined Saudi Professional League side Al-Hilal on a season-long loan, became the first Emirati to play abroad.

=== Al Jazira ===
==== 2019–20 season ====
On 8 August 2019, Abdulrahman joined Al Jazira on a three-year contract. He would make 19 appearances and score three goals before the season was cancelled.

==== 2020–21 season ====
On last day of the January transfer window, Abdulrahman terminated his contract with Al Jazira by a mutual agreement. He had been injured throughout the entire season.

=== Shabab Al-Ahli ===
==== 2020–21 season ====
On 10 February, Shabab Al Ahli announced the signing of Abdulrahman on a six-month deal.

== International career ==
In 2010, Abdulrahman was called up for the 2010 GCC U-23 Championship, in which he assisted a one goal in four matches played and was the first title for him. A month later has been called up for the UAE U-20, for the 2010 AFC U-19 Championship, it was his first participation in the continental championship, he played all matches and scored a goal and assisted two. At the same year he was part of a team that won silver medal in Asian Games in China. He made his international debut on 3 January 2011, in a friendly match against Syria at the age of 19. He was on the starting lineup and been substituted at the beginning of the second half.

=== 2010 Asian Games ===
On 7 November, in a 1–1 tie against Hong Kong, Abdulrahman was substituted on in the second half but was sent off in the 88th minute after got two yellow cards. Abdulrahman returned to the team on 11 November in the qualifying match for the Round of 16 after a 3–0 win over Uzbekistan. He came on as a substitute for Theyab Awana in the second half. Abdulrahman started in UAE's following 2–0 win over the Kuwait. On 19 November, UAE advanced to the semi-finals in a 9–8 penalty shoot-out win against North Korea (0–0 a.e.t.), with Abdulrahman scoring as the fifth penalty taker. He assisted Ahmed Ali the only goal of the match to help his side to a 0–1 extra-time win against South Korea. UAE went on to lose 1–0 to Japan in the final.

=== 2011 AFC Asian Cup ===
Abdulrahman was the youngest player in the UAE squad and seventh youngest player of the tournament. In his first official match at an international competition against North Korea, Abdulrahman came on as a substitute for Ismail Matar in the 92nd minute in a 0–0 draw. In the third and last group stage match against Iran he came on as a substitute for Ali Al-Wehaibi in the 53rd minute in a 3–0 loss.

=== 2012 Summer Olympics ===
Abdulrahman represented his country at the 2012 Summer Olympics in London. In the first match against Uruguay which his team lost 1–2. After the match Uruguayan Luis Suárez swapped jerseys with him. He also participated in the match against Great Britain which resulted in a loss 3–1 but he assisted the goal and as he did in Uruguay match he dominated the match. After the match in an interview with Manchester City's defender Micah Richards he said that Abdulrahman has a bright future ahead, to add to that Ryan Giggs went to him to the changing room and personally gave him his game shirt.

=== 21st Arabian Gulf Cup ===
Abdulrahman was named in UAE's squad for the 21st Arabian Gulf Cup in Bahrain. On 5 January 2013, in the opening match victory against Qatar, after Qatar took the lead from a penalty spot, two minutes later Abdulrahman scored the equaliser from a curled in a free kick, it was the 800th goal in the Gulf Cup record, and provided an assist for Mohamed Ahmed to score the third. was named man of the match. In the next match, Abdulrahman played a part in the second goal to progress his side to Semi-finals in a 2–1 victory over Bahrain. In the last group match against Oman, he came off the bench in place of Saeed Al-Kathiri in the 81st minute, with the score at 0–0. He was able to make the difference and rebalance the midfield in the last 10 minutes and give his team a 2–0 lead within two minutes. In the Semi-finals, Abdulrahman helped UAE through to the final, when he played a part in the only goal in a 1–0 victory over Kuwait. He helped his team win the Gulf Cup after a 2–1 victory over Iraq in the final, in the 28th minute Abdulrahman scored. He was selected as man of the match and Player of the Tournament.

=== 2015–16: AFC Asian Cup, 2018 FIFA World Cup qualification ===
Abdulrahman was included in Mahdi Ali's final list for 2015 AFC Asian Cup tournament. He started UAE's first match against Qatar which UAE won the game 4–1 and Abdulrahman assisted the first goal. In next match, against Bahrain, he assisted again to Ali Mabkhout to score UAE's first goal in the 45th second. UAE won the match 2–1 and advanced to the knockout stage for the first time since 1996. At the end of the match, Abdulrahman was named as man of the match by the AFC. He end with 4 assists, tying with Massimo Luongo as the competition's assist leader.

On 3 September 2015, Abdulrahman provided 6 assists to lead UAE to a 10–0 victory against Malaysia in the second round of the 2018 FIFA World Cup qualification, that named him as man of the match.

== Style of play ==
Abdulrahman has played as a winger, attacking midfielder and is also known for his passing accuracy, dribbling and his ability to set up goals. He has ball control, balance and skill. Abdulrahman also a set pieces can take corners, penalties and is said to be a free kicks specialist.

== Outside football ==
=== Personal life ===
Omar Abdulrahman has two sisters and three older brothers who are also involved in football: Ahmed Abdulrahman who played for Masfout but his career came to an end due to injury. Khaled Abdulrahman a defender and Mohamed Abdulrahman a forward both play currently for Al Ain.

=== Media ===
In 2016, Arabian Business ranked Abdulrahman 25 in its list of the 100 most powerful Arabs under 40. On 28 April 2013, Abdulrahman was chosen with sports commentator Faris Awad as ambassadors for The Million Player Competition.

=== Sponsorships ===
In October 2012, Abdulrahman signed on a contract with sportswear company Nike. In April 2013, Abdulrahman signed an agreement with Etisalat to become the brand ambassador and appear on its commercial and public campaigns and become an ambassador for social causes. Abdulrahman has been confirmed as ambassador and front cover for the Middle East edition of the Konami video game Pro Evolution Soccer 2016 alongside Barcelona's Neymar.

=== 2013 FIFA U-17 World Cup ===
In June 2013, Abdulrahman was appointed by the 2013 FIFA U-17 World Cup Local Organising Committee as the tournament's official ambassador.

== Career statistics ==
=== Club ===
As of 1 February 2021

Appearances and goals by club, season and competition
Club	Season	League			Cup (Note: Includes the UAE President Cup, Kings Cup, Arab Club Champions Cup)		League Cup		Asia		Other (Note: Includes the Arabian Gulf Super Cup, one appearance in Saudi Super Cup, one appearance in Saudi-Egyptian Super Cup)		Total	
Club	Season	Division	Apps	Goals	Apps	Goals	Apps	Goals	Apps	Goals	Apps	Goals	Apps	Goals
Al Ain	2008–09	Pro League	6	3	0	0	2	0	—		0	0	8	3
Al Ain	2009–10	Pro League	1	1	0	0	1	0	1	0	—		3	1
Al Ain	2010–11	Pro League	21	8	2	1	1	0	5	2	—		29	11
Al Ain	2011–12	Pro League	7	2	0	0	2	0	—		—		9	2
Al Ain	2012–13	Pro League	22	7	2	0	0	0	6	1	1	0	31	8
Al Ain	2013–14	Pro League	17	1	3	0	0	0	7	1	1	0	28	2
Al Ain	2014–15	Pro League	11	3	2	0	0	0	10	2	1	0	24	5
Al Ain	2015–16	Pro League	22	2	4	3	1	0	14	3	1	0	42	8
Al Ain	2016–17	Pro League	22	6	2	2	0	0	10	7	—		34	15
Al Ain	2017–18	Pro League	13	5	3	0	1	0	7	2	—		24	7
Al Ain	Total		142	38	16	6	8	0	61	18	4	0	231	62
Al Hilal	2018–19	Professional League	5	1	0	0	—		0	0	2	0	7	1
Al Jazira	2019–20	Pro League	19	3	1	0	2	1	—		—		22	4
Al Jazira	2020–21	Pro League	2	0	0	0	0	0	—		—		2	0
Al Jazira	Total		21	3	1	0	2	1	0	0	0	0	24	4
Shabab Al-Ahli	2021–22	Pro League	1	0	0	0	0	0	0	0	0	0	1	0
Career total			169	42	17	6	10	1	61	18	6	0	263	67

=== International ===
As of 2025

Appearances and goals by national team and year
National team	Year	Apps	Goals
United Arab Emirates U23	2010	4	0
United Arab Emirates U23	2011	6	1
United Arab Emirates U23	2012	3	0
Total		13	1
United Arab Emirates	2011	4	0
United Arab Emirates	2012	5	2
United Arab Emirates	2013	15	3
United Arab Emirates	2014	2	1
United Arab Emirates	2015	13	2
United Arab Emirates	2016	13	1
United Arab Emirates	2017	8	0
United Arab Emirates	2018	8	2
United Arab Emirates	2019	5	0
United Arab Emirates	2022	2	0
Total		75	11

Scores and results list United Arab Emirates' goal tally first, score column indicates score after each Abdulrahman goal.

List of international goals scored by Omar Abdulrahman
No.	Date	Venue	Opponent	Score	Result	Competition
1	16 October 2012	Za'abeel Stadium, Dubai, United Arab Emirates	Bahrain	6–2	6–2	Friendly
2	25 December 2012	Khalifa International Stadium, Doha, Qatar	Yemen	2–0	2–0	Friendly
3	5 January 2013	Khalifa Sports City Stadium, Isa Town, Bahrain	Qatar	1–1	3–1	21st Arabian Gulf Cup
4	18 January 2013	Bahrain National Stadium, Riffa, Bahrain	Iraq	1–0	2–1	21st Arabian Gulf Cup
5	15 November 2013	Mohammed Bin Zayed Stadium, Abu Dhabi, United Arab Emirates	Hong Kong	3–0	4–0	2015 AFC Asian Cup qualification
6	27 May 2014	Stade de la Fontenette, Carouge, Switzerland	Armenia	2–2	3–4	Friendly
7	16 June 2015	Shah Alam Stadium, Shah Alam, Malaysia	Timor-Leste	1–0	1–0	2018 FIFA World Cup qualification
8	17 November 2015	Shah Alam Stadium, Shah Alam, Malaysia	Malaysia	1–0	2–1	2018 FIFA World Cup qualification
9	29 March 2016	Mohammed Bin Zayed Stadium, Abu Dhabi, United Arab Emirates	Saudi Arabia	1–1	1–1	2018 FIFA World Cup qualification
10	11 September 2018	Estadi Palamós Costa Brava, Palamós, Spain	Laos	3–0	3–0	Friendly
11	11 October 2018	Estadi Olímpic Lluís Companys, Barcelona, Spain	Honduras	1–1	1–1	Friendly

== Honours ==
Al Ain

- UAE Pro-League: 2011–12, 2012–13, 2014–15, 2017–18
- UAE League Cup: 2008–09
- UAE Super Cup: 2009, 2012, 2015
- UAE President's Cup: 2008–09, 2013–14, 2017–18
- AFC Champions League: Finalist 2016

Al Hilal

- Saudi Super Cup: 2018
- AFC Champions League: 2019

Al Wasl

- UAE Pro-League: 2023–24

UAE Youth

- GCC U-23 Championship: 2010

UAE

- Arabian Gulf Cup: 2013
- AFC Asian Cup: Third place 2015

Individual

- Al Ain International U-17 Player of the Tournament: 2008, 2009
- Young Player of the Year: 2009, 2011
- Al-Ahram Young Arab player of the Year: 2010
- Arabian Gulf Cup MVP: 2013
- Al Hadath Al Riyadi Young Arab player of the Year: 2013
- AGL Fans’ Player of the Year: 2012–13
- Emirati Player of the Year: 2013
- OSN Cup MVP: 2013
- AFC Champions League Dream Team: 2014
- AGL Emirati Player of the Year: 2012–13, 2014–15, 2015–16, 2017–18
- Arabian Gulf League Top Assist Provider: 2013–14, 2015–16
- AFC Asian Cup Dream Team: 2015
- Al-Ahram Arab player of the Year: 2015, 2016
- Mars d’Or Arab player of the Year: 2015
- AFC Champions League Most Valuable Player : 2016
- Asian Footballer of the Year: 2016
- ABA Arab Player of the Year: 2016
- GSA Best Player in the GCC: 2016
- Fans' Asian Champions League XI: 2016
