= Hassan Al Hammadi =

Emirati association football player

Hassan Al Hammadi حسن الحمادي
Personal information
- Full name: Hassan Abdulrahman Abdullah Al Hammadi
- Date of birth: 24 November 1989 (age 36)
- Place of birth: Emirates
- Height: 1.82 m (6 ft 0 in)
- Position: Defender

Youth career
- 2003–2010: Al-Dhafra

Senior career*
| Years | Team | Apps | (Gls) |
| 2010–2019 | Al-Dhafra | 38 | (1) |
| 2017 | → Al-Shaab (loan) | | |
- * Club domestic league appearances and goals

Hassan Al Hammadi (Arabic: حسن الحمادي; born 1 May 1997) is an Emirati footballer. He currently plays as a defender .

== Career ==
=== Al-Dhafar ===
Al Hammadi started his career at Al-Dhafra and is a product of the Al-Dhafra's youth system. On 28 May 2011, Al Hammadi made his professional debut for Al-Dhafra against Al-Nasr in the Pro League, he played with them until 2019.

=== Al-Shaab (loan) ===
On 11 January 2017, left Al-Dhafra and signed with Al-Shaab on loan until the end of the season.
