= Mubarak Al Mansoori =

Emirati association football player (born 1991)

Mubarak Al Mansoori مبارك المنصوري
Personal information
- Full name: Mubarak Abdullah Al Mansoori
- Date of birth: 22 November 1991 (age 34)
- Place of birth: Emirates
- Height: 1.65 m (5 ft 5 in)
- Position: Left-back

Youth career
- 2005–2011: Al-Wahda

Senior career*
Years	Team	Apps	(Gls)
2011–2015	Al-Wahda	25	(0)
2015	Al-Wasl	0	(0)
2016	Al-Shaab	0	(0)
2016–2019	Baniyas	25	(0)
2019–2020	Al-Hamriyah		
- * Club domestic league appearances and goals

Mubarak Al Mansoori (Arabic:مبارك المنصوري) (born 22 November 1991) is an Emirati footballer who plays as a left back, most recently for Al-Hamriyah.

== Career ==
=== Al-Wahda ===
Al Mansoori started his career at Al-Wahda and is a product of the Al-Wahda's youth system. On 23 January 2012, Al Mansoori made his professional debut for Al-Wahda against Al-Shabab in the Pro League, replacing Haider Alo Ali.

=== Al-Wasl ===
On 16 July 2015, left Al-Wahda and signed with Al-Wasl.

=== Al-Shaab ===
On 19 September 2015, left Al-Wasl and signed with Al-Shaab.

=== Baniyas ===
On 10 August 2016, left Al-Shaab and signed with Baniyas. On 27 January 2017, Al Mansoori made his professional debut for Baniyas against Al-Shabab in the Pro League. landed with Baniyas from the UAE Pro League to the UAE First Division League in 2016-17 season. ended up with Baniyas from the UAE First Division League to the UAE Pro League in the 2017-18 season.

=== Al-Hamriyah ===
On 16 July 2019, left Baniyas and signed with Al-Hamriyah.
