= Thamer Mohammed =

Emirati footballer (born 1984)

Personal information
- Full name: Thamer Mohammed
- Date of birth: 10 October 1984 (age 42)
- Place of birth: United Arab Emirates
- Height: 1.83 m (6 ft 0 in)
- Position: Defender

Youth career
- Al-Jazira

Senior career*
Years	Team	Apps	(Gls)
2004–2007	Al-Jazira		
2007–2009	Al-Shaab		
2009–2014	Baniyas		
2014	Al-Ahli		
2014–2015	Al Wasl		
2015–2016	Baniyas		
2016–2017	Al-Ittihad		
- * Club domestic league appearances and goals

Thamer Mohammed (Arabic: ثامر محمد; born 10 October 1984) is an Emirati footballer.
