= Ali Rabee (footballer, born 1981) =

Emirati association football player

Ali Rabee علي ربيع
Personal information
- Full name: Ali Mohammed Rabee Al-Tonaiji
- Date of birth: 28 August 1981 (age 45)
- Place of birth: Emirates
- Height: 1.78 m (5 ft 10 in)
- Position: Defender

Youth career
- Al-Rams

Senior career*
Years	Team	Apps	(Gls)
2002–2006	Al-Rams		
2006–2011	Emirates Club		
2011–2013	Al-Wasl		
2012	→ Emirates Club (loan)		
2013–2015	Al-Shaab		
2015–2016	Ajman		
2016–2018	Emirates Club		
2018–2019	Al Urooba		
2019–2020	Al Hamriyah		
2020–2021	Dibba Al-Hisn		
- * Club domestic league appearances and goals

Ali Rabee (Arabic: علي ربيع) (born 28 August 1981) is an Emirati footballer. He currently plays as a defender.

== Career ==
He formerly played for Al-Rams, Emirates Club, Al-Wasl, Al-Shaab, Ajman, Al Urooba, and Al Hamriyah .
