= Mohammed Khalaf =

Emirati footballer

Personal information
- Full name: Mohammed Ahmed Khalaf Al-Hammadi
- Date of birth: 1 January 1989 (age 37)
- Place of birth: United Arab Emirates
- Height: 1.80 m (5 ft 11 in)
- Position: Goalkeeper

Team information
- Current team: Baniyas
- Number: 1

Youth career
- Al Wahda

Senior career*
Years	Team	Apps	(Gls)
2009–	Baniyas		
2016–2017	→ Al-Shaab (loan)		
- * Club domestic league appearances and goals

Mohammed Khalaf (Arabic:محمد خلف) (born 21 December 2000) is an Emirati footballer. He currently plays as a goalkeeper for Baniyas.
