= Khaled Shamarikh =

Emirati footballer (born 1990)

Personal information
- Full name: Khaled Mohammed Shamarikh
- Date of birth: 7 June 1990 (age 36)
- Place of birth: United Arab Emirates
- Height: 1.79 m (5 ft 10 1/2 in)
- Position: Defender

Youth career
- 2004–2008: Al Urooba

Senior career*
Years	Team	Apps	(Gls)
2008–2011	Al Urooba		
2011–2019	Emirates Club		
2019–2020	Ittihad Kalba		
2020	→ Al Urooba (loan)		
2020–2022	Dibba		
2022–2023	Al Dhaid		
- * Club domestic league appearances and goals

Khaled Shamarikh (Arabic:خالد شماريخ) (born 7 June 1990) is an Emirati footballer who plays as a defender.
