= Khalid bin Mohammed Stadium =

Multi-use stadium in Sharjah, United Arab Emirates

Coordinates: 25°22′27″N 55°25′23″E

- Interactive map of Khalid bin Mohammed Stadium
- Address: Sharjah; United Arab Emirates
- Capacity: 12000

Construction
- Opened: 1974

Tenants
- Al-Shaab CSC 1974-2017 Al Bataeh Club Current Sharjah FC Youth - Current

Khalid Bin Mohammed Stadium is a multi-use stadium in Sharjah, United Arab Emirates. It is currently used mostly for football matches and was the home ground of Al Shaab Club. Currently it is the home ground for Al Bataeh Club and the youth teams of Sharjah FC. The stadium holds 12,000 people.

The stadium was built in 1974 and renovated in 2017. Apart from home matches of Al Shaab and Al Bataeh, it hosted several international friendly matches and in November 2023 it hosted a 2026 FIFA World Cup qualification match between Lebanon and Palestine that finished with a goalless draw. It also hosted FC Dynamo Kyiv for a winter training camp in 2021.
