= Abdullah Ali (footballer) =

Emirati footballer (born 1985)

Personal information
- Full name: Abdullah Ali Mohammad Hassan Al-Bloushi
- Date of birth: 21 February 1985 (age 41)
- Place of birth: United Arab Emirates
- Height: 1.71 m (5 ft 7 in)
- Position: Midfielder

Youth career
- –2005: Al-Nasr

Senior career*
Years	Team	Apps	(Gls)
2005–2008	Al-Nasr		
2013–2017	Emirates	88	(2)
2017–2019	Hatta		
2019–2020	Emirates		
2020–2022	Dibba		
- * Club domestic league appearances and goals

Abdullah Ali Mohammad Hassan Al-Bloushi (Arabic: عبد الله علي; born 21 February 1985) is an Emirati footballer who plays as a midfielder.

Ali has played professionally for Al-Nasr Dubai SC, Al-Ahli Dubai F.C. and Emirates Club.
