= Sulaiman Al-Maghni =

Emirati footballer (born 1982)

Personal information
- Full name: Sulaiman Yousef Al-Maghni
- Date of birth: 15 January 1982 (age 44)
- Place of birth: United Arab Emirates
- Height: 1.79 m (5 ft 10 1/2 in)
- Position: Midfielder

Senior career*
Years	Team	Apps	(Gls)
2004–2010	Ittihad Kalba		
2010–2013	Al-Sharjah		
2013–2018	Ittihad Kalba		
- * Club domestic league appearances and goals

Sulaiman Al-Maghni (Arabic:سليمان المغني) (born 15 January 1982) is an Emirati footballer. He currently plays as a midfielder .
