= Talal Hamad =

Emirati footballer (born 1987)

Personal information
- Full name: Talal Hamad Saeed Al Mahri
- Date of birth: 7 March 1987 (age 39)
- Place of birth: United Arab Emirates
- Height: 1.78 m (5 ft 10 in)
- Position: Defender

Youth career
- Al-Sharjah

Senior career*
Years	Team	Apps	(Gls)
2007–2008	Al-Sharjah		
2008–2014	Al-Nasr		
2014–2016	Emirates Club		
2016–2017	Dibba Al-Fujairah		
- * Club domestic league appearances and goals

Talal Hamad (Arabic:طلال حمد) (born 7 March 1987) is an Emirati footballer who played in the Arabian Gulf League for Al-Nasr and Emirates Club.
