= Aboubacar M'Baye Camara =

Guinean footballer

Aboubacar Camara
Personal information
- Full name: Aboubacar M'Baye Camara
- Date of birth: December 27, 1985 (age 40)
- Place of birth: Conakry, Guinea
- Height: 1.73 m (5 ft 8 in)
- Position: Midfielder

Team information
- Current team: Andenne

Youth career
- 1997–2002: Satellite FC

Senior career*
Years	Team	Apps	(Gls)
2003–2004	Satellite FC		
2004–2009	K.S.C. Lokeren	137	(13)
2009–2010	Al-Khaleej	27	(8)
2010–2012	Dubai CSC	38	(11)
2012–2013	Ittihad Kalba	37	(12)
2013–2014	Union Sportive Vaise	38	(13)
2015	AS Kaloum		
2017	Meux		
2017–2018	Spy		
2019–	Andenne		

International career
2005–2007	Guinea U-21	15	(?)
2008–2009	Guinea	4	(0)
- * Club domestic league appearances and goals

Aboubacar M'Baye Camara (born 27 December 1985) is a Guinean footballer who plays as a midfielder for Andenne.

== Career ==
He joined in summer 2004 to Belgian side K.S.C. Lokeren Oost-Vlaanderen from his native Guinean club Satellite FC.

In 2017, Camara signed with Meux. He joined Belgian Division 3 club Spy the following season.
