= Waleed Salem Sulaiman =

Emirati footballer (born 1980)

Waleed Salem
Personal information
- Full name: Waleed Salem Sulaiman Surour Al Jaberi
- Date of birth: 28 October 1980 (age 46)
- Place of birth: United Arab Emirates
- Height: 1.77 m (5 ft 9 1/2 in)
- Position: Goalkeeper

Senior career*
Years	Team	Apps	(Gls)
2001–2016	Al-Ain		
2017–2018	Al Urooba		

International career
2002–2007	UAE	35	(0)
- * Club domestic league appearances and goals

Waleed Salem Sulaiman Surour Al Jaberi (Arabic: وليد سالم سليمان سرور الجابري; born 28 October 1980) is an Emarati footballer who plays as a goalkeeper.

He was the first choice goalkeeper at 2010 AFC Champions League, played 5 out of possible 6 matches.
