= Asamoah Gyan =

Ghanaian footballer (born 1985)

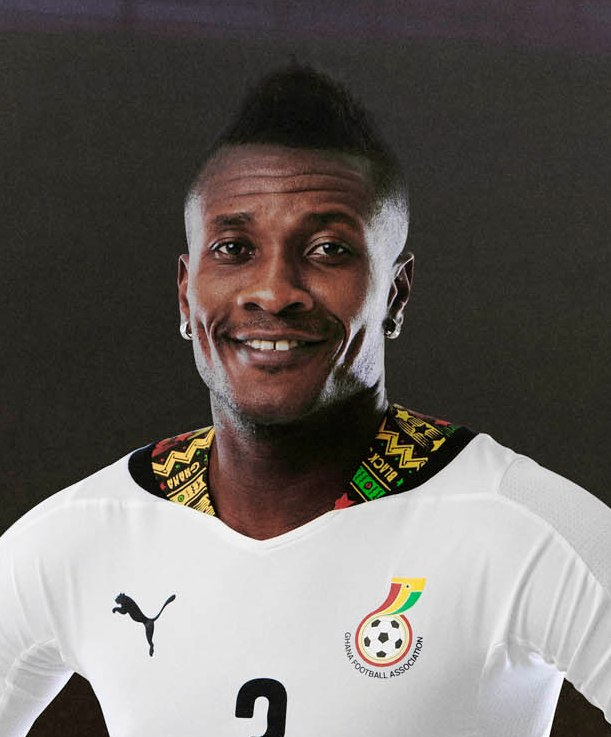
- Gyan with Ghana in 2014

Personal information
- Full name: Asamoah Gyan
- Date of birth: 22 November 1985 (age 40)
- Place of birth: Accra, Greater Accra, Ghana
- Height: 1.86 m (6 ft 1 in)
- Position: Striker

Senior career*
Years	Team	Apps	(Gls)
2003	Liberty Professionals	16	(10)
2003–2008	Udinese	39	(11)
2004–2006	→ Modena (loan)	53	(15)
2008–2010	Rennes	48	(14)
2010–2012	Sunderland	34	(10)
2011–2012	→ Al Ain (loan)	18	(22)
2012–2015	Al Ain	65	(73)
2015–2017	Shanghai SIPG	20	(7)
2016–2017	→ Shabab Al Ahli (loan)	14	(6)
2017–2019	Kayserispor	26	(5)
2019–2020	NorthEast United	8	(4)
2020–2021	Legon Cities	6	(0)
Total		347	(177)

International career
2003–2019	Ghana	109	(51)
Medal record
Men's football
Representing Ghana
African Cup of Nations
Runner-up	2010 Angola
Runner-up	2015 Equatorial Guinea
Third place	2008 Ghana
- * Club domestic league appearances and goals

Asamoah Gyan (/ˌæsəˈmoʊə ˈdʒɑːn/ ASS-ə-MOH-ə JAHN; born 22 November 1985) is a Ghanaian former professional footballer who played as a striker. He is a former captain of the Ghana national team.

Gyan began his career in 2003 with Ghana Premier League club Liberty Professionals, scoring ten goals in sixteen matches. He then spent three seasons with Serie. A club Udinese via two seasons loan at Modena, netting on fifteen occasions in 53 league matches and at Udinese where he scored 11 times in 39 league matches. In 2008, Gyan joined Ligue 1 club Rennes, netting fourteen times in forty-eight league matches during two seasons. In 2010, Gyan joined then Premier League club Sunderland, breaking the club's transfer record and netting on ten occasions in thirty-four Premier League matches during two seasons.

In 2011, Gyan joined Al Ain of the UAE Pro League on loan and became the league's top goalscorer, scoring 22 times in 18 matches. In the following season, Gyan permanently joined Al Ain and helped them retain the Pro League title, once again, finishing as the league's top goalscorer with an impressive 31 goals in 22 matches. In the 2013–14 league season, Gyan finished top scorer for a record third time, with 29 goals in 26 matches.

Gyan is the all-time leading goalscorer of the Ghana national team, with 51 goals. He represented Ghana at the 2006, 2010 and 2014 FIFA World Cups. With six goals, he is the top African goalscorer in the history of the World Cup. Gyan also represented Ghana at the 2004 Summer Olympics and in seven Africa Cup of Nations (2008, 2010, 2012, 2013, 2015, 2017 and 2019), helping them finish in third place in 2008 and as runners-up in 2010 and 2015. He launched his memoir, titled "LeGYANdry" at the Kempinski Gold Coast Hotel in Accra. On 20 June 2023, Gyan announced his retirement from active football.

== Personal life ==
Gyan is the last born of his parents, Baffour Gyan Mensah (Father) and the late Madam Cecilia Amoako (Mother). His elder brother Baffour Gyan is also a former professional footballer. Gyan was married to Gifty Sandra Dzamesi and together, they had three children, namely, Rafael Gyan, Frederick Gyan, Floyd Gyan.

== Club career ==
=== Liberty Professionals ===
Born in Accra, Gyan had his early education at Seven Great Princess Academy in Dansoman completing in 1999, and his secondary education at the Accra Academy from 1999 to 2002. Gyan started his career at Ghanaian club Liberty Professionals located in Accra. In his only top flight season with the club, he played 16 league matches in the Ghana Premier League and scored 10 goals. He ended the season as the league's third top goal scorer.

=== Udinese ===
Having signed for Udinese in 2003, he spent two years on loan at Serie B club Modena to gain match experience. Following some excellent displays during the 2006 World Cup, he attracted interest from Russian club Lokomotiv Moscow. Gyan returned to Udinese at the start of 2006, but on 17 February 2007, Udinese pulled out of a deal to sell him in the January transfer window. The striker was on the verge of signing a three-year deal with Russian Club Lokomotiv Moscow for US$10.5 million, the fourth largest transfer fee in Russian football history. "The striker Udinese targeted to replace me did not sign for them," Gyan told BBC Sport. "I've been told I will now have to stay in Italy for the rest of the season."

On 10 August 2007, along with Fabio Quagliarella, Gyan signed an improved five-year contract extension to stay at Udinese until 30 June 2012, as a reward for his fine form in the 2007–08 pre-season. "I have decided to stay here because it is one of the top leagues in the world," Asamoah said, "There is the possibility of me playing regular football here to make me a better player. "I am comfortable with the new deal and I know I can help Udinese achieve things for the future". Gyan and Quagliarella marked their contract extensions with a brace each in Udinese's 7–0 friendly win later that evening.

On 29 July 2007, following his impressive pre-season form, including a hat-trick in a friendly against Serie B outfit Spezia on 25 July 2007, before Udinese sealed the long-term deal. Gyan scored eight goals in 2006–07 to help the Stadio Friuli club finish in 10th place in Serie A.

Gyan was dogged by injury during the 2007–08 season and never appeared for Udinese again after January 2008, having played only 13 Serie A matches and scored 3 times that season.

=== Rennes ===
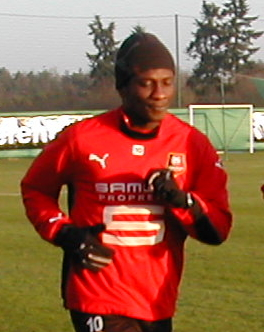
Gyan training whilst at Stade Rennais F.C.

On 11 July 2008, Gyan was signed by Ligue 1 club Stade Rennais for four years on an €8 million transfer fee. Gyan played 48 times for Rennes, scoring 14 goals. By the end of his stay at Rennes, he became well known for his goal scoring abilities, scoring 13 league goals in the 2009–10 season. However, Gyan only played three games in Ligue 1 the following season, taking his total appearances to 53, before he departed for Sunderland.

=== Sunderland ===
On 31 August 2010, Gyan signed for Premier League club Sunderland on a four-year deal for a club record £13 million. Gyan was later given the squad number 33 shirt at Sunderland. He scored on his Sunderland debut against Wigan Athletic on 11 September after coming on as a substitute for Danny Welbeck. The match ended in a 1–1 draw with Antolín Alcaraz scoring Wigan's equaliser. He marked his first start for Sunderland by netting their only goal in their League Cup exit at the hands of West Ham United. Gyan scored twice on his first Premier League start for the club in a 2–0 win against Stoke City on 6 November. His first goal came in the 9th minute when a Nedum Onuoha shot was parried by goalkeeper Asmir Begović, with Gyan on hand to tap home the rebound and his second came in the 86th minute, to secure a 2–0 victory for the Black Cats. Three days later, he followed this up by scoring the equaliser against Tottenham at White Hart Lane in a 1–1 draw as Sunderland moved up to seventh in the table. He also scored a goal in Sunderland's 3–0 victory at Stamford Bridge against Chelsea. Gyan scored Sunderland's third goal in their 3–0 victory over Blackburn Rovers on 1 January 2011.

On 16 January 2011, he started against local rivals Newcastle United, scoring a 94th-minute equaliser, preventing Newcastle gaining their second win of the season against Sunderland. Gyan added to his impressive goalscoring tally with a goal away at Stoke City on 5 February 2011. He scored an 11th-minute goal against Tottenham on 12 February 2011. Gyan's next goal came on 23 April as Sunderland beat Wigan Athletic 4–2, a match which ended prematurely for the forward as he was substituted following a hamstring injury which was expected to see him miss the remainder of the season. Gyan did recover in time to feature in Sunderland's last game of the season at West Ham but didn't add to his tally finishing his first season in English football with 10 league goals. Gyan took the squad number 3 shirt for the 2011–12 season, the same squad number he wore for Ghana.

=== Al Ain ===
On 10 September 2011, it was confirmed on the Sunderland website that Gyan would leave on a season long loan to club Al Ain FC. Amid speculation of a fee of up to £6 million being paid for the loan period, with Gyan receiving up to four times his previous salary, Chairman Niall Quinn emphasised the financial benefits of the deal for both Sunderland and the player. The Ghanaian finished the season with Al Ain by helping them capture their tenth league success and was the top goalscorer in the season with 22 league goals.

When Martin O'Neill became manager of Sunderland on 8 December 2011, he considered the possibility of recalling Gyan from his loan spell away from the club.

Gyan signed a five-year contract with Al Ain on 6 July 2012, worth over £6m per season. He was the top goalscorer in the UAE league in the 2013 season and helped his team retain the league title. On 24 July 2014, Gyan announced on his personal website that he had signed a contract extension at Al-Ain, receiving an improved deal and tying him to the club until 2018.

=== Shanghai SIPG ===
On 7 July 2015, Gyan confirmed on his own website that he had left Al Ain and was set to join Chinese Super League club Shanghai SIPG. Shanghai SIPG then officially announced they signed Gyan from Al Ain with an undisclosed fee. It was then revealed that Gyan's weekly salary of £227,000 with his Chinese club instantly made him one of the world's best paid football players.

=== Kayserispor ===
On 5 July 2017, he joined the Turkish club Kayserispor. On 9 August 2019, Gyan left Kayserispor.

=== North East United ===
On 19 September 2019, he joined the Indian Super League side NorthEast United. On 26 October 2019, he scored his first goal for Northeast United FC against Odisha FC in the 84 th minute of the match as his team won the game by 2–1. Halfway through the season, he suffered an injury that would keep him out for the rest of the season, and on 15 January 2020, he was officially released from the club as Irish striker Andy Keogh was signed as a replacement. He ended his time with Northeast United with a total of 4 goals in 8 appearances.

=== Legon Cities ===
On 1 November 2020, Gyan returned to Ghana to join Legon Cities, in a loan deal worth more than 1 million dollars. He played his first match on 27 November 2020, coming on in the 71st minute for Raphael Ocloo in their goalless draw against Medeama, marking a 17-year return to the Ghana Premier League since leaving his boyhood club Liberty Professionals to sign for Italian club Udinese. On 3 June 2021, Gyan started his first match for the Royals in the 2021 Ghanaian FA Cup Round of 64 match against Uncle 'T', which ended in a 2–1 victory at Accra Sports Stadium via a brace from Richmond Antwi.

=== Retirement ===
Gyan announced his retirement from active football on 20 June 2023, marking the end of a career spanning two decades. The announcement took place at the 30th Afreximbank Annual Meetings held at the Accra International Conference Centre.

Gyan's retirement statement reflected the sentiment that the time had come for him to bid farewell to his illustrious playing career, acknowledging the natural progression that all footballers eventually face. He expressed gratitude to his country, family, colleagues, and everyone who contributed to his football journey. Gyan also expressed his intention to remain involved in the sport, focusing on coaching, football business, and scouting, while continuing to nurture young talents, as exemplified by his recent involvement in the Baby Jet U16 African Tournament.

== International career ==
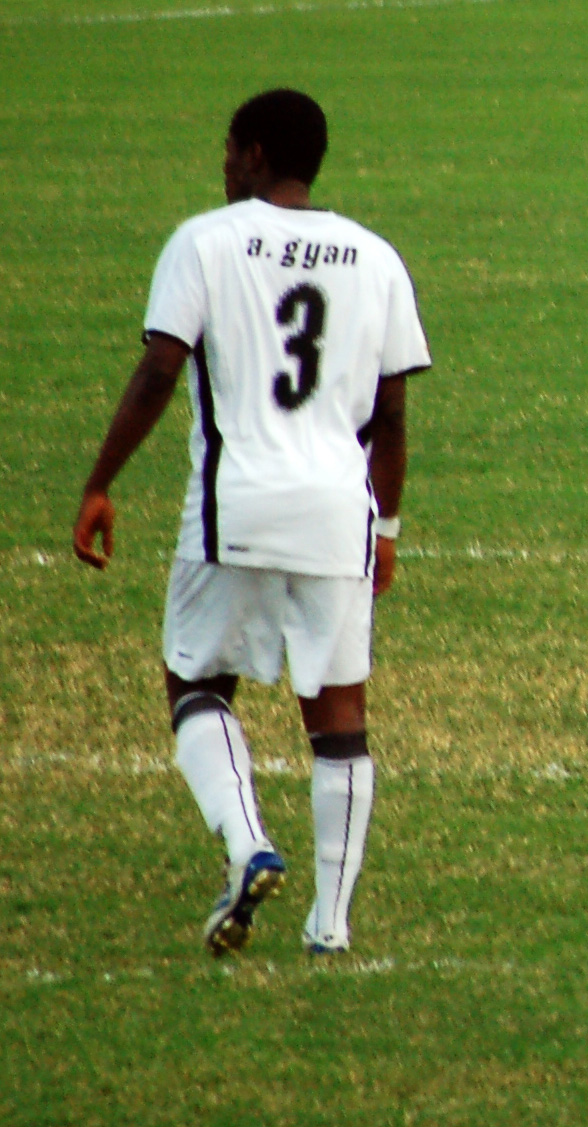
Gyan playing for Ghana in 2008

Gyan made his international debut at the age of 17, three days before his 18th birthday. Gyan scored on his senior International debut for Ghana against Somalia on 19 November 2003, in the 90th minute. He came on for Nana Arhin Duah in the 77th minute in a 2006 FIFA World Cup qualifier, three days before he turned 18 years; helping Ghana to win that game, and making him the youngest ever player to score for Ghana.

He scored four times in seven matches during that successful World Cup qualifying campaign, helping Ghana to qualify for their first world cup in history. He was part of the 2004 Ghana Olympic squad, who exited in the first round, having finished in third place in Group B.

He also scored the fastest goal of the tournament after 68 seconds. The strike was also Ghana's first ever goal in the FIFA World Cup, coming in the game against the Czech Republic on 17 June at the RheinEnergieStadion in Cologne, Germany, which set the Black Stars on their way to a 2–0 victory. He missed a penalty later in the game, and received a yellow card ruling him out of the final group game for trying to take the penalty too early. In Ghana's defeat to Brazil in the round of 16, he was sent off in the 81st minute after collecting his second booking of the match (for diving).

On 24 January 2008, during the Africa Cup of Nations, Gyan and his brother Baffour decided to walk out on the Black Stars following criticism after their unconvincing 1–0 win over Namibia. The media learnt the brothers had packed their bags and were ready to leave the team hotel but were persuaded to stay by teammates. In the 2010 Africa Cup of Nations, Asamoah Gyan helped a Ghana team, ravaged by injuries to the finals. Gyan scored three out of the four Ghana goals during the tournament.

Gyan scored with a penalty in the 85th minute of Ghana's first match of the 2010 World Cup against Serbia, in a 1–0 win. He hit the goalpost in the 92nd minute before being substituted to a standing ovation just before the final whistle. In Ghana's second game, he scored a penalty in the 26th minute to level the scores and earn his team a 1–1 draw against Australia.

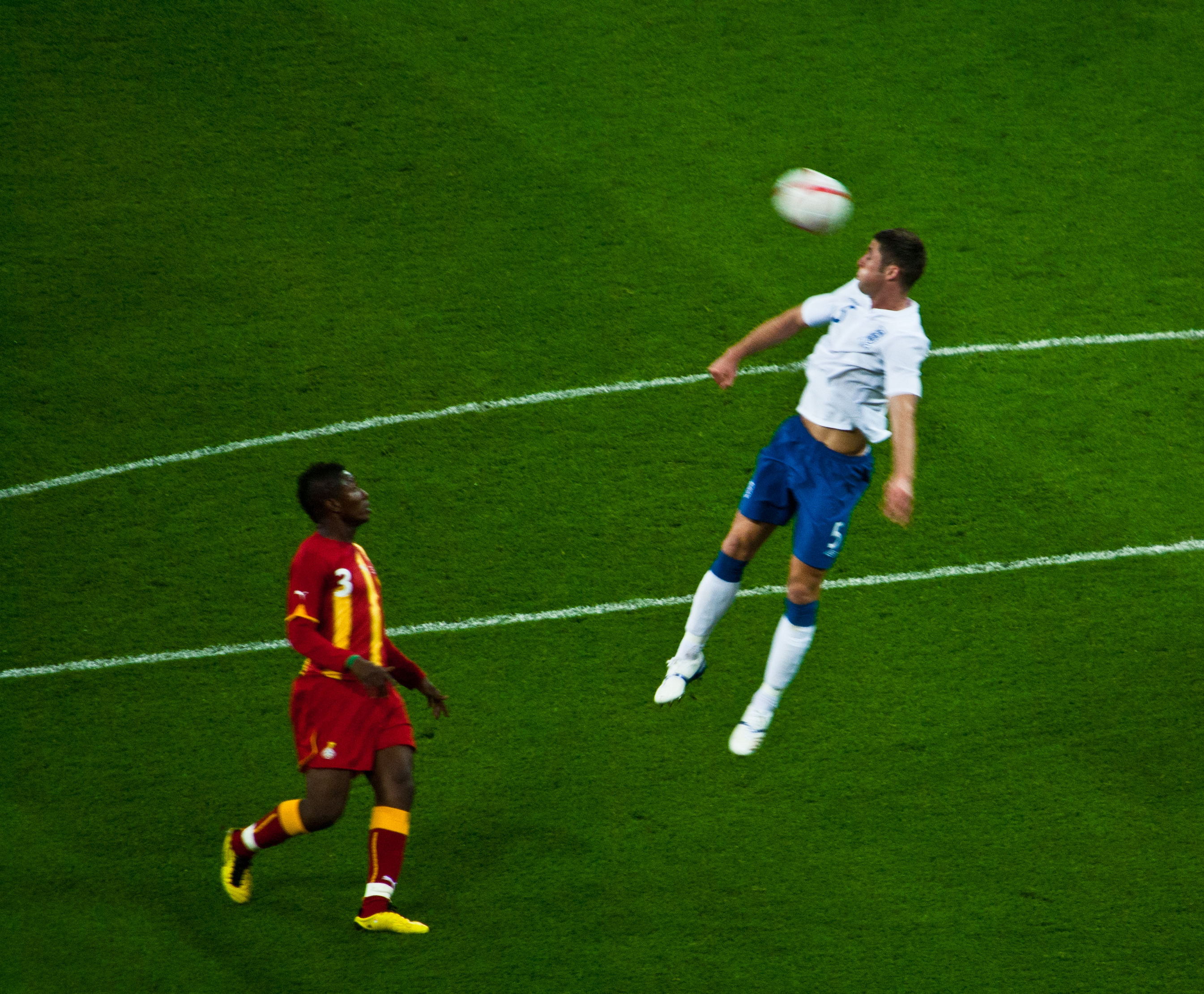
Asamoah Gyan playing against England in 2011

In the round of 16 match against the United States, he scored a goal in extra time allowing Ghana to win 2–1 and hence become the third African team in history to qualify to the tournament's quarter final, after Cameroon and Senegal. In the quarter final tie against Uruguay, following Luis Suárez's handling of the ball on the goal-line, he missed a penalty kick with no time remaining at end of extra time, hitting the crossbar and necessitating a penalty shootout to decide the game. He converted his kick in the subsequent penalty shootout, but Uruguay went on to win the shootout 4–2.

For the second time in his career, Gyan missed a crucial penalty kick in a major tournament when he had his penalty kick saved in the 2012 African Cup of Nations semi-final. Ghana went on to lose 1–0. After missing that penalty kick, Gyan decided to take an "indefinite break" from international football. On 8 May 2012, he announced his return to the Black Stars team.

On 7 June 2013, he scored 2 goals in a 3–1 win over Sudan in a World Cup qualifier to make him the country's leading goalscorer, surpassing Abedi Pele's 33 goals.

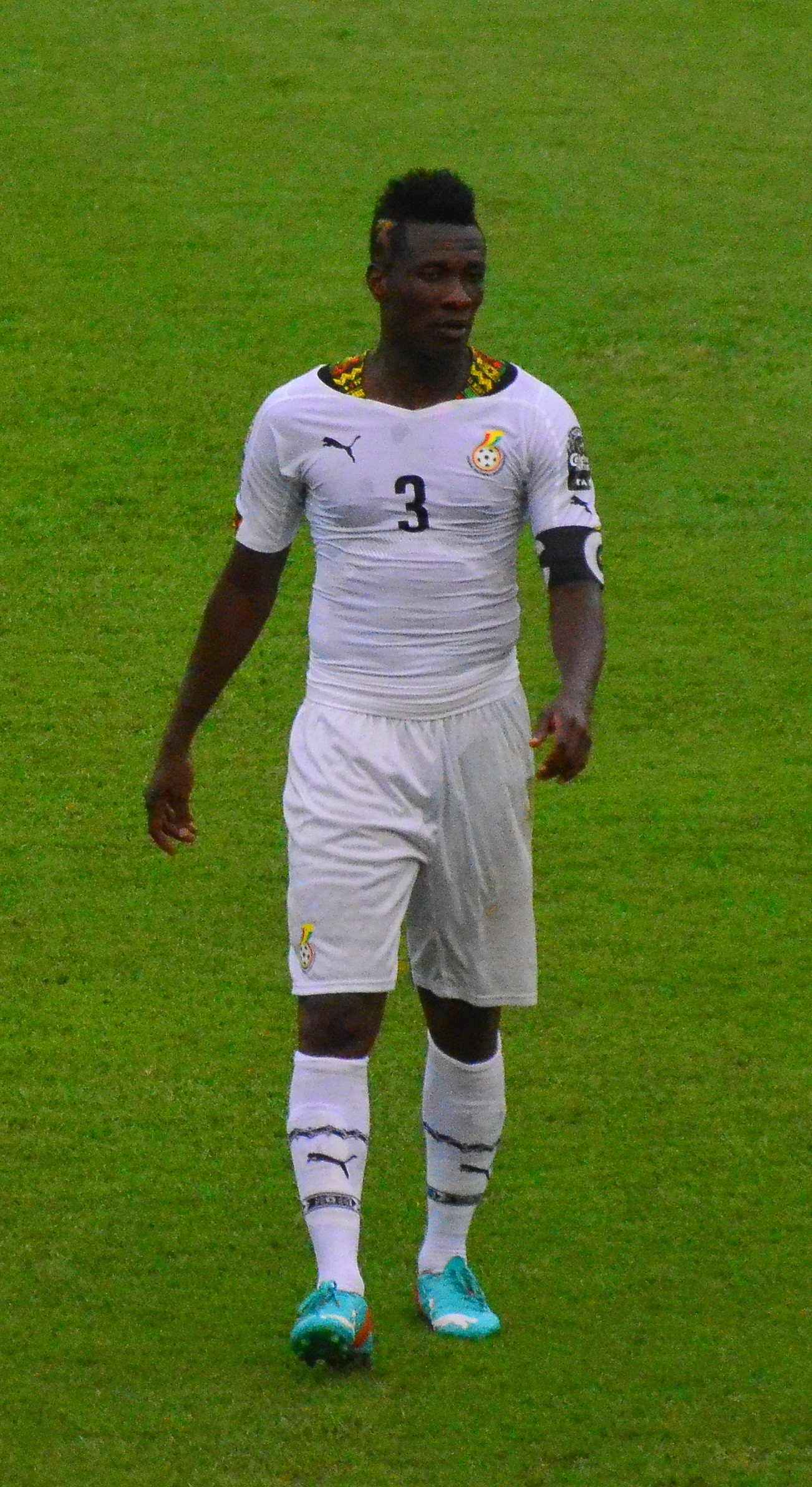
Gyan playing for Ghana at the AFCON 2015

On 2 June 2014, Gyan was named in Ghana's squad for the 2014 FIFA World Cup. In the team's opening match, he captained the Black Stars against the United States in a 2–1 defeat. He scored his first goal of the tournament in a 2–2 draw with Germany, equaling Roger Milla's record of five FIFA World Cup goals. In the final group match, he became the top African goalscorer in World Cup finals history by scoring the Black Stars' goal as they were defeated 2–1 by Portugal.

At the 2015 Africa Cup of Nations, Gyan missed Ghana's opening match, a 2–1 loss to Senegal, with a "mild bout" of malaria. He returned for the second match, scoring a last minute winning goal against the tournament favourite Algeria in a 1–0 win for the Black Stars. An international exile lasting over a year was ended in October 2018 when Gyan was called up to the Ghanaian squad for a pair of 2019 Africa Cup of Nations qualification matches versus Sierra Leone.

He announced his retirement from international football on 20 May 2019, a month to the 2019 Africa Cup of Nations. However, a day later Gyan reversed his decision following a discussion with the president of Ghana, Nana Addo Dankwa Akufo-Addo. In early August 2022 Gyan released a statement that he was training to get back to full fitness to play in the 2022 World Cup in Qatar. Gyan was not part of the 26 man squad selected to represent Ghana in the World Cup 2022 and since then has been an ample supporter of the Black Stars and has been leading fan festivals and ceremonies. Gyan retired as Ghana's all-time leading goal scorer, amassing a total of 51 goals in 109 appearances for his country. He also retires holding the record for the highest number of goals scored by any African player in the history of the World Cup, with a tally of six goals.

== Outside football ==
=== Boxing promotion ===
In June 2012, Gyan turned his attention towards boxing promotion and announced he would put on his debut boxing show in Ghana. On 6 July 2012, Asamoah Gyan stated:

Ghana has a lot of great boxers previously like Azumah Nelson, Ike Quartey and Joshua Clottey, so we need to push the young ones coming up. I would like to encourage the young ones coming up and those who want to achieve their aim.

— Asamoah Gyan

In February 2021, a contract between Baby Jet Promotions and Emmanuel Tagoe who was the only boxer in the promotion's fold was terminated. The contract was for a period spanning October 2018 to November 2021.

=== Baby Jet Airlines ===
As of October 2017, Asamoah Gyan has been granted an Air Carrier Licence (ACL) by the Ghanaian Civil Aviation Authority (GCAA). According to the Ghana News Agency, the start-up is named Baby Jet Airlines. With the license in hand, the start-up is now permitted to begin with its AOC certification drive.

=== Tennis ===
He began to play tennis in 2020 to keep him fit after a long break due to injury. Baby Jet promotions linked up with MANCWA Commodities to run the Top 16 Invitational tournament in a bid to promote the sport.

== Career statistics ==
=== Club ===
Appearances and goals by club, season and competition
Club	Season	League			National cup (Note: Includes Coppa Italia, Coupe de France, FA Cup, UAE President's Cup, Turkish Cup)		League cup (Note: Includes Coupe de la Ligue, Football League Cup, UAE League Cup)		Continental		Other		Total	
Club	Season	Division	Apps	Goals	Apps	Goals	Apps	Goals	Apps	Goals	Apps	Goals	Apps	Goals
Liberty Professionals	2003	Ghana Premier League	16	10	—		—		—		—		16	10
Udinese	2003–04	Serie A	1	0	0	0	—		—		—		1	0
Udinese	2006–07	Serie A	25	8	1	0	—		—		—		26	8
Udinese	2007–08	Serie A	13	3	0	0	—		—		—		13	3
Udinese	Total		39	11	1	0	—		—		—		40	11
Modena (loan)	2004–05	Serie B	28	7	0	0	—		—		—		28	7
Modena (loan)	2005–06	Serie B	25	8	1	0	—		—		—		26	8
Modena (loan)	Total		53	15	1	0	—		—		—		54	15
Rennes	2008–09	Ligue 1	16	1	2	0	1	0	1 (Note: Appearance in UEFA Cup)	0	—		20	1
Rennes	2009–10	Ligue 1	29	13	1	0	0	0	—		—		30	13
Rennes	2010–11	Ligue 1	3	0	0	0	0	0	—		—		3	0
Rennes	Total		48	14	3	0	1	0	1	0	—		53	14
Sunderland	2010–11	Premier League	31	10	1	0	1	1	—		—		33	11
Sunderland	2011–12	Premier League	3	0	0	0	1	0	—		—		4	0
Sunderland	Total		34	10	1	0	2	1	—		—		37	11
Al Ain (loan)	2011–12	UAE Pro League	18	22	1	2	5	3	—		0	0	24	27
Al Ain	2012–13	UAE Pro League	22	31	2	0	0	0	4 (Note: Appearances in AFC Champions League)	1	1 (Note: Appearance in UAE Super Cup)	0	29	32
Al Ain	2013–14	UAE Pro League	26	29	4	6	2	0	12	12	1	0	45	47
Al Ain	2014–15	UAE Pro League	17	13	1	4	0	0	6	5	1	0	25	22
Al Ain	Total		83	95	8	12	7	3	22	18	3	0	123	128
Shanghai SIPG	2015	Chinese Super League	10	4	1	1	—		—		—		11	5
Shanghai SIPG	2016	Chinese Super League	10	3	1	0	—		4	0	—		15	3
Shanghai SIPG	Total		20	7	2	1	—		4	0	—		26	8
Shabab Al-Ahli (loan)	2016–17	UAE Pro League	14	6	1	0	3	3	7	2	1	0	26	11
Kayserispor	2017–18	Süper Lig	12	1	5	3	—		—		—		17	4
Kayserispor	2018–19	Süper Lig	14	4	3	1	—		—		—		17	5
Kayserispor	Total		26	5	8	4	—		—		—		34	9
NorthEast United	2019–20	Indian Super League	8	4	—		—		—		—		8	4
Legon Cities	2020–21	Ghana Premier League	6	0	1	0	—		—		—		7	0
Career total			347	177	26	17	13	7	34	20	4	0	424	221

—

=== International ===
Appearances and goals by national team and year
National team	Year	Apps	Goals
Ghana	2003	2	1
Ghana	2004	3	2
Ghana	2005	5	5
Ghana	2006	9	4
Ghana	2007	4	1
Ghana	2008	4	1
Ghana	2009	5	2
Ghana	2010	17	7
Ghana	2011	5	4
Ghana	2012	8	1
Ghana	2013	15	11
Ghana	2014	9	6
Ghana	2015	8	3
Ghana	2016	2	0
Ghana	2017	9	3
Ghana	2018	0	0
Ghana	2019	4	0
Total		109	51

== Honours ==
Rennes

- Coupe de France runner-up: 2008–09

Al Ain

- UAE Pro League: 2011–12, 2012–13, 2014–15
- UAE President's Cup: 2013–14
- UAE Super Cup: 2012

Shabab Al Ahli

- UAE League Cup: 2016–17
- UAE Super Cup: 2016

Ghana

- Africa Cup of Nations runner-up: 2010, 2015; third place: 2008

Individual

- BBC African Footballer of the Year: 2010
- African Footballer of the Year runner-up: 2010
- CAF Team of the Year: 2010, 2013, 2014
- UAE Pro League top scorer: 2011–12, 2012–13, 2013–14
- AFC Champions League top scorer: 2014
- AFC Champions League Dream Team: 2014
- AFC Foreign Player of the Year: 2014
- GCC Golden Boot: 2011–12, 2012–13, 2013–14
- UAE President's Cup top scorer: 2013–14, 2014–15
- Africa Cup of Nations Team of the Tournament: 2010, 2013
- Ghana Men's Player of the Year Award: 2012
- Ghana Football Awards Player of the Decade: 2011–2020
- Ghana Player of the Year: 2010, 2014
- Calcio Trade Ball Order of the Star Award: 2017

Records

- Al Ain second all-time top scorer: 128 goals
- Al Ain second all-time Pro League top scorer: 95 goals
- Al Ain most league goals in a season: 31 goals (2012–13 season)
- Al Ain second-most AFC Champions League goals: 18 goals
- Most UAE Pro League top scorer awards: 3 (shared with Fahad Khamees, Kodjo Laba)
- Most GCC Golden Boot (Arabian Golden Boot) awards: 3
- Ghana national team all-time top goalscorer: 51 goals
- Ghana national team second all-time appearance holder: 109 appearances
- Most FIFA World Cup goals for Ghana: 6 goals
- Youngest goalscorer for Ghana national team: 17 years, 362 days (for Ghana vs Somalia, 2003)
- Most tournaments representing Ghana at Africa Cup of Nations: 7 tournaments (shared with André Ayew)
- Most Africa Cup of Nations tournaments with a goal: 6 tournaments (shared with Samuel Eto'o, Kalusha Bwalya, André Ayew)
- Most FIFA World Cup goals scored by an African player: 6 goals

== See also ==
- List of top international men's football goalscorers by country
- List of men's footballers with 100 or more international caps
- List of men's footballers with 50 or more international goals
- List of FIFA World Cup top goalscorers

Preceded by John Mensah	Ghana national football team captain 2012–2019	Succeeded by André Ayew
