= Hassan Mohammed (footballer) =

Emirati footballer (born 1989)

Personal information
- Full name: Hassan Mohammed Hassan Taher
- Date of birth: 10 September 1989 (age 37)
- Place of birth: United Arab Emirates
- Height: 1.78 m (5 ft 10 in)
- Position: Forward

Youth career
- Dubai

Senior career*
Years	Team	Apps	(Gls)
2009–2012	Dubai		
2012–2015	Al-Nasr		
2015–2019	Al-Wasl		
- * Club domestic league appearances and goals

Hassan Mohammed (Arabic: حسن محمد; born 10 September 1989) is an Emirati footballer who played as a forward .
