= Mohammed Nasser (footballer, born 1988) =

Emirati footballer (born 1988)

Mohammed Naser
Personal information
- Full name: Mohammed Nasser Ali Mohammed Al Mesmari
- Date of birth: 18 March 1988 (age 38)
- Place of birth: Fujairah, United Arab Emirates
- Height: 1.82 m (5 ft 11 1/2 in)
- Position: Striker

Youth career
- Al-Fujairah

Senior career*
Years	Team	Apps	(Gls)
2006–2008	Al-Fujairah		
2008–2011	Al Shabab		
2011–2013	Al Ain		
2013–2014	Al-Wasl		
2014–2017	Baniyas		
2016–2017	→ Al-Fujairah (loan)		
2017–2018	Ajman Club		
2018–2019	Al Hamriyah		

International career
2012	United Arab Emirates		
- * Club domestic league appearances and goals

Mohammed Nasser Ali Mohammed Al Mesmari (Arabic: محمد ناصر علي محمد ربيع المسماري, born March 18, 1988) is an Emirati footballer who plays as a striker.
