= Mohamed Malallah =

Emirati footballer (born 1984)

Personal information
- Full name: Mohamed Malallah; Hassan Malallah Mohamed
- Date of birth: 1 April 1984 (age 42)
- Place of birth: Khor Fakkan, United Arab Emirates
- Height: 1.72 m (5 ft 8 in)
- Position: Forward

Youth career
- Al Khaleej Club

Senior career*
Years	Team	Apps	(Gls)
2005–2009	Al Khaleej Club	0	(5)
2009–2011	Al-Nasr	20	(1)
2011	Ittihad Kalba	16	(6)
2011–2013	Al Ain	6	(0)
2013	→ Ittihad Kalba (loan)	0	(0)
2013–2014	Al Shaab	0	(0)
2014–2016	Emirates Club		
2016–2018	Hatta		
2018–2019	Dibba Al-Hisn		
2019–2020	Khor Fakkan		

International career^{‡}
2004	UAE Olympic	0	(1)
- * Club domestic league appearances and goals as of 13 June 2011 ‡ National team caps and goals as of 8 October 2009 (UTC)

Mohamed Malallah Hassan Malallah Mohamed (Arabic: محمد مال الله حسن مال الله; born 1 April 1984) is an Emirati footballer. who currently plays a former UAE Olympic football team in 2004.

== Club career ==
=== Al-Khaleej ===
Mohamed began his career with the Al Khaleej Club. His talent started to evolve something and he rose to the first team and scored many goals with the club. He also contributed to the rise of the club to the First Division many times.

== International career ==
Malallah played for the UAE at the 2003 FIFA World Youth Championship finals.
