= Nabil Daoudi =

Moroccan footballer (born 1983)

Nabil Daoudi (born 25 July 1983) is a Moroccan former professional footballer who played as a forward. He played for Emirates.
