= Al-Shaab CSC =

Multi-sports club in the United Arab Emirates

Al-Shaab
- Full name: Al-Shaab Cultural & Sports Club
- Nickname: The Commandos
- Founded: 1974
- Dissolved: 2017
- Ground: Khalid bin Mohammed Stadium
- Capacity: 5,000
- 2016–17: 6th
Home colours	Away colours

Al-Shaab Cultural & Sports Club (Arabic: نادي الشعب الثقافي الرياضي) commonly known as Al-Shaab CSC, was a multi-sports club based in Sharjah, United Arab Emirates. Founded in 1974, the club became known for its football team, which was nicknamed “The Commandos.” Throughout its history, Al-Shaab played an important role in the sporting community of Sharjah and competed in domestic football competitions until the club merged with Sharjah FC following the 2016–17 UAE Pro League season. Although Al-Shaab CSC no longer operates as an independent club, its history, achievements, and contribution to football remain part of Sharjah’s sporting heritage.

== History ==
The club’s football team achieved significant success in domestic competitions. They secured the UAE Division One title twice, in the 1992–93 and 1997–98 seasons. Their most notable triumph came in 1993 when they won both the UAE President's Cup and the UAE Super Cup, marking a remarkable double in the club’s history. The following year in the 1994–95 Asian Cup Winners' Cup, Al-Shaab defeated Al-Ittihad and became the first Emirati football club in history to secure a spot in a continental final but they finished as runners up after a 2–1 defeat to Yokohama Flügels.

Al-Shaab CSC played its home matches at the Khalid bin Mohammed Stadium, which has a capacity of 5,000 spectators.

In 2017, a significant restructuring of UAE football led to the merger of Al-Shaab CSC with Sharjah FC, forming the Sharjah FC. This merger aimed to consolidate resources and talent, enhancing the competitive stature of football in the region.

Throughout its existence, Al-Shaab CSC was instrumental in promoting sports and cultural activities in Sharjah, leaving a lasting legacy in the UAE’s football history.

== Honours ==
- UAE Division One: 2

1992–93, 1997–98

- UAE President's Cup: 1

1993

- UAE Super Cup: 1

1993

== Managerial history ==
Name	Nat.	From	To	Ref.
Dragan Gugleta	(Federal Republic of Yugoslavia)	2000	2001	
Reiner Hollmann	(Germany)	2001	2002	
Roland Andersson	(Sweden)	2002	March 2003	
Mohamed Bouznjal	(United Arab Emirates)	March 2003	2003	
Zoran Filipović	(Serbia and Montenegro)	2003	2004	
Jan Versleijen	(Netherlands)	June 2004	May 2005	
Willi Reimann	(Germany)	July 2005	December 2005	
Youssef Zouaoui	(Tunisia)	December 2005	2007	
Zlatko Kranjčar	(Croatia)	June 2007	December 2007	
Lotfi Benzarti	(Tunisia)	December 2007	May 2008	
Luka Peruzović	(Croatia)	June 2008	October 2008	
Ayman El Ramadi	(Egypt)	October 2008	February 2009	
Youssef Zouaoui	(Tunisia)	February 2009	May 2009	
Ferid Ben Belgacem	(Tunisia)	July 2009	March 2010	
Ahmad Al-Ajlani	(Tunisia)	March 2010	2010	
Renê Weber	(Brazil)	July 2010	January 2011	
Ahmad Al-Ajlani	(Tunisia)	January 2011	May 2011	
Youssef Zouaoui	(Tunisia)	August 2011	December 2011	
Sérgio Alexandre	(Brazil)	December 2011	December 2012	
Marius Șumudică	(Romania)	December 2012	December 2013	
Željko Petrović	(Montenegro)	December 2013	May 2014	
Eid Baroot	(United Arab Emirates)	May 2014	May 2015	
Tarek El Ashry	(Egypt)	June 2015	November 2015	
Walter Zenga	(Italy)	November 2015	February 2016	
Stefano Cusin	(Italy)	February 2016	May 2016	
Ghazi Ghrairi	(Tunisia)	May 2016	December 2016	
Péricles Chamusca	(Brazil)	December 2016	2017	

== See also ==
- List of football clubs in the United Arab Emirates
