= 2009–10 Al Ain FC season =

Al Ain
2009–10 season
- President: Mohammed Bin Zayed
- Chairman: Hazza Bin Zayed
- Head coach: Winfried Schäfer (from 26 Dec 2007) (until 2 December 2009); Rachid Benmahmoud* (from 2 December 2009) (until 11 December 2009); Toninho Cerezo (from 11 December 2009) (until 14 April 2010); Abdulhameed Al Mistaki* (from 14 April 2010)
- Stadium: Khalifa bin Zayed
- UAE Pro League: 3rd
- President's Cup: Round of 16
- League Cup: Semi-finals
- UAE Super Cup: Winners
- AFC Champions League: 2010: Group stage
- Top goalscorer: League: José Sand (24); All: José Sand (33)
Home colours	Away colours	Third colours

The 2009–10 season was Al Ain Football Club's 42nd in existence and the club's 35th consecutive season in the top-level football league in the UAE.

Al Ain began this season by winning the Super Cup. To continue his career at winning competitions, after a Great achievement in last season, at winning two titles in two weeks., Etisalat Emirates Cup and UAE President Cup.

During the summer transfer window, Al Ain Club signing with Emerson for 2 years from Flamengo, and with the player Jose Sand from Lanús at $10 million for 4 years, Also signed a contract with Ittihad kalba goalkeeper Yousef Abdulrahman at $10 million for 5 years .

On 18 January, During The winter transfer window opened, Al Ain Club signing the Asian foreigner and the four professional player in the team Lee Ho from Seongnam Ilhwa Chunma till the end of the season, and he was given the number 50.

== Players ==
=== First Team ===
Note: Flags indicate national team as defined under FIFA eligibility rules; some limited exceptions apply. Players may hold more than one non-FIFA nationality.

No.	Pos.	Nation	Player
1	GK	UAE	Yousif Al Bairaq
2	FW	UAE	Abdulaziz Fayez
3	DF	UAE	Hilal Saeed
4	DF	UAE	Msalam Fayez
5	DF	UAE	Ismail Ahmed
6	MF	UAE	Omar Abdulrahman
7	MF	UAE	Ali Al-Wehaibi
8	FW	BRA	Emerson
9	FW	ARG	José Sand
10	MF	CHI	Jorge Valdivia (captain)
11	MF	UAE	Ahmad Mathaad
12	GK	UAE	Waleed Salem
13	MF	UAE	Rami Yaslam
15	FW	UAE	Nasser Khamis
17	MF	UAE	Ahmed Al-Shamsi
18	FW	UAE	Ahmed Khamis

No.	Pos.	Nation	Player
19	DF	UAE	Mohanad Salem
20	FW	UAE	Mohammed Abdulrahman
21	DF	UAE	Fawzi Fayez
22	GK	UAE	Sultan Musabah
23	MF	UAE	Shehab Ahmed
24	MF	UAE	Abdullah Malallah
26	MF	UAE	Saif Mohammed
27	MF	UAE	Salem Abdullah
30	GK	UAE	Abdulla Sultan
44	DF	UAE	Faris Jumaa
50	MF	KOR	Lee Ho
77	MF	UAE	Hazaa Salem
80	DF	UAE	Mohamed Fayez
99	FW	UAE	Faisal Ali

=== Starting 11 ===

No.	Pos.	Name
1	GK	(United Arab Emirates) Waleed Salim
5	DF	(United Arab Emirates) Ismaeel Ahmed
19	DF	(United Arab Emirates) Mohanad Salem
44	DF	(United Arab Emirates) Fares Jumaa
80	DF	(United Arab Emirates) Mohammed Fayez
10	MF	(Chile) Jorge Valdivia
27	MF	(United Arab Emirates) Salem Abdullah
26	MF	(United Arab Emirates) Saif Mohammed
7	MF	(United Arab Emirates) Ali Al-Wehaibi
8	FW	(Brazil) Emerson
9	FW	(Argentina) José Sand

=== From youth system ===
Note: Flags indicate national team as defined under FIFA eligibility rules; some limited exceptions apply. Players may hold more than one non-FIFA nationality.

No.	Pos.	Nation	Player
20	FW	UAE	Mohammed Abdulrahman
6	MF	UAE	Omar Abdulrahman
15	DF	UAE	Khaled Abdulrahman
2	FW	UAE	Abdulaziz Fayez

== Transfers ==
=== In ===
No.	Position	Player	From	Fee	Date	Ref.
1	GK	(United Arab Emirates) Yousif Al Bairaq	(United Arab Emirates) Ittihad Kalba	Undisclosed	21 June 2009	
9	FW	(Argentina) José Sand	(Argentina) Lanús	€9,280,000	8 August 2009	
8	FW	(Brazil) Emerson	(Brazil) Flamengo	€1,600,000	2 September 2009	
50	MF	(South Korea) Lee Ho	(South Korea) Seongnam	Free transfer	18 January 2010	

=== Out ===
No.	Position	Player	To	Fee	Date	Ref.
—	MF	(United Arab Emirates) Fadel Ahmad	(United Arab Emirates) Al Wasl	Undisclosed	8 June 2009	
29	DF	(United Arab Emirates) Jumaa Abdullah	(United Arab Emirates) Al Jazira	€610,000	13 June 2009	
6	DF	(United Arab Emirates) Ali Msarri	(United Arab Emirates) Baniyas	€410,000	18 June 2009	
1	GK	(United Arab Emirates) Mutaz Abdulla	(United Arab Emirates) Al Wahda	Undisclosed	20 June 2009	
16	DF	(United Arab Emirates) Abdullah Ali	(United Arab Emirates) Baniyas	Undisclosed	28 June 2009	
—	DF	(United Arab Emirates) Mahboob Juma	(United Arab Emirates) Ajman	Free transfer	4 July 2009	
14	FW	(Senegal) André Senghor	(United Arab Emirates) Baniyas	Undisclosed	1 July 2009	
99	FW	(Brazil) André Dias	Unattached		1 July 2009	
25	DF	(United Arab Emirates) Humaid Fakher	(United Arab Emirates) Baniyas	Undisclosed	17 July 2009	
77	MF	(United Arab Emirates) Darwish Ahmed	(United Arab Emirates) Al Wasl	Undisclosed	23 July 2009	

=== Loans out ===
No.	Pos	Name	To	Start date	End date	Ref.
8	MF	(United Arab Emirates) Ahmad Khalfan	(United Arab Emirates) Al Wasl	19 June 2009	End of Season	
33	FW	(Morocco) Soufiane Alloudi	(Morocco) Raja	19 August 2009	End of Season	

== Managerial changes ==
=== During the season ===
Outgoing manager	Manner of departure	Date of vacancy	Replaced by	Date of appointment	Position in table
(Germany) Winfried Schaefer	Sacked	2 December 2009	(Morocco) Rachid Benmahmoud (Caretaker)	2 December 2009	3rd
(Morocco) Rachid Benmahmoud	Caretaker	11 December 2009	(Brazil) Toninho Cerezo	11 December 2009	4th
(Brazil) Toninho Cerezo	Sacked (poor ACL performances)	14 April 2010	(United Arab Emirates) Abdulhameed Al Mistaki (Coach U17) (Caretaker)	14 April 2010	3rd

== Pre-season and friendlies ==
Win Draw Loss Fixtures

=== UAE-Germany Super Cup ===
5 February 2010	Al Ain	1–2	SV Werder Bremen	Al Ain
8:00	Abdulaziz .F 59'	(Report)	Pizarro 41', 43'	Stadium: Khalifa bin Zayed

== Competitions ==
=== Overview ===
Competition	First match	Last match	Starting round	Final position	Record							
Competition	First match	Last match	Starting round	Final position	Pld	W	D	L	GF	GA	GD	Win %
Pro League	28 September 2009	16 May 2010	Matchday 1	3rd	22	14	3	5	57	29	+28	63.64
League Cup	8 October 2009	27 March 2010	Group stage	Semi-finals	8	4	2	2	13	12	+1	50.00
President's Cup	24 November 2009	24 November 2009	Round of 16	Round of 16	1	0	1	0	0	0	+0	0.00
Champions League	24 February 2010	27 April 2010	Group stage	Group stage	6	2	1	3	8	8	+0	33.33
Total					37	20	7	10	78	49	+29	54.05

Last updated: 16 May 2010
Source: Competitions

=== UAE Pro League ===
==== League table ====
Pos	Team	Pld	W	D	L	GF	GA	GD	Pts	Qualification or relegation
1	Al-Wahda (C)	22	19	1	2	42	15	+27	58	2010 FIFA Club World Cup play-off stage and 2011 AFC Champions League group stage
2	Al-Jazira	22	15	6	1	48	26	+22	51	2011 AFC Champions League group stage (Note: Emirates Club, which played in the UAE Division 1 Group A, also secured 2011 AFC Champions League group stage qualification by winning the 2009–10 UAE President's Cup.)
3	Al-Ain	22	14	3	5	57	29	+28	45	2011 AFC Champions League qualifying play-off
4	Baniyas	22	10	6	6	44	37	+7	36	
5	Al-Wasl	22	8	5	9	41	40	+1	29	

Source: goalzz.com
Rules for classification: 1) points; 2) goal difference; 3) number of goals scored.
(C) Champions

==== Results summary ====
Overall								Home						Away					
Pld	W	D	L	GF	GA	GD	Pts	W	D	L	GF	GA	GD	W	D	L	GF	GA	GD
22	14	3	5	57	29	+28	45	7	1	3	26	14	+12	7	2	2	31	15	+16

Last updated: 16 May 2010.
Source: UAE Premier League

==== Results by round ====
Round	1	2	3	4	5	6	7	8	9	10	11	12	13	14	15	16	17	18	19	20	21	22
Ground	H	A	H	A	H	H	A	H	A	A	H	A	H	A	H	A	A	H	A	H	H	A
Result	W	W	W	D	W	D	L	L	W	W	W	W	W	W	L	W	L	L	W	W	W	D
Position	3	1	1	1	1	2	3	4	3	3	3	3	3	3	3	3	3	3	3	3	3	3

Updated to match(es) played on 16 May 2010. Source: UPLeague
A = Away; H = Home; W = Win; D = Draw; L = Loss; P = Postponed

==== Matches ====
28 September 2009 1	Al Ain	2–0	Al Nasr	Al Ain
17:25 GMT+4 (UAE Time)	Sand 20' (pen.); Emerson 89' (pen.)	Report		Stadium: Khalifa bin Zayed; Referee: Abdullah Al Ajeel

2 October 2009 2	Al Ahli	1–5	Al Ain	Dubai
20:00 GMT+4 (UAE Time)	M. Srour 5'	Report	Emerson 20'; Sand 22', 47', 66'; Ahmed. K 91'	Stadium: Rashid Stadium; Referee: Mohamed Al-Zarouni

18 October 2009 3	Al Ain	3–2	Ajman	Al Ain
17:05 GMT+4 (UAE Time)	Sand 41', 52'; Emerson 68'	Report	Sektioui 30'; Kazemian 79'	Stadium: Khalifa bin Zayed; Referee: Abdulwahid Qhater

24 October 2009 4	Al Jazira	2–2	Al Ain	Abu Dhabi
20:00 GMT+4 (UAE Time)	Koutouan 50', 54' (pen.)	Report	I. Ahmed 18'; Sand 62'	Stadium: Mohammed bin Zayed; Referee: Ali Al-Badwawi

29 October 2009 5	Al Ain	4–0	Al Shabab	Al Ain
20:00 GMT+4 (UAE Time)	Sand 24' (pen.), 30'; Mohanad .S 82'; Emerson 88'	Report		Stadium: Khalifa bin Zayed; Referee: Mohamed Al Junaibi

7 November 2009 6	Al Ain	1–1	Al Dhafra	Al Ain
16:50 GMT+4 (UAE Time)	Sand 75' (pen.)	Report	Lawal 27' (pen.)	Stadium: Khalifa bin Zayed; Referee: Abdullah Al Ajeel

1 December 2009 7	Al Wahda	1–0	Al Ain	Abu Dhabi
20:00 GMT+4 (UAE Time)	Al-Kamali 43'	Report		Stadium: Al Nahyan Stadium; Referee: Fareed Al-Marzouqi

6 December 2009 8	Al Ain	1–3	Al Wasl	Al Ain
20:00 GMT+4 (UAE Time)	Shehab .A 22'	Report	Darweesh 46', 85'; Oliveira 70'	Stadium: Khalifa bin Zayed; Referee: Mohamed Omar

21 December 2009 9	Emirates	0–1	Al Ain	Ras Al Khaimah
16:45 GMT+4 (UAE Time)		Report	Emerson 90'	Stadium: Emirates Club Stadium; Referee: Mohammed Abdulla

10 January 2010 10	Baniyas	1–6	Al Ain	Al Ain
17:00 GMT+4 (UAE Time)	Senghor 60'	Report	Emerson 5' (pen.), 74' (pen.); Thamer .M 16' (o.g.); Salem .A 53'; Mohammed .A 63', 91'	Stadium: Tahnoun bin Mohammed; Referee: Mohamed Al-Zarouni

16 January 2010 11	Al Ain	2–1	Sharjah	Al Ain
20:00 GMT+4 (UAE Time)	Emerson 19'; Sand 92'	Report	Marcelinho 25' (pen.)	Stadium: Khalifa bin Zayed; Referee: Fareed Al-Marzouqi

29 January 2010 12	Al Nasr	0–2	Al Ain	Dubai
20:00 GMT+4 (UAE Time)		Report	Al-Wehaibi 14'; Emerson 28' (pen.) (red card) 65'	Stadium: Al Maktoum Stadium; Referee: Mohammed Abdulla

8 February 2010 13	Al Ain	5–1	Al Ahli	Al Ain
20:00 GMT+4 (UAE Time)	Sand 3', 71'; A. Malallah 5', 86'; Hilal .M 68'	Report	A. Khalil 85'	Stadium: Khalifa bin Zayed; Attendance: 10,500; Referee: Mohamed Al Junaibi

13 February 2010 14	Ajman	4–5	Al Ain	Ajman
17:25 GMT+4 (UAE Time)	G. Harib 3'; Kabi 13'; Kader 48', 91'	Report	Salem .A 20'; Valdivia 31', 49'; Sand 45', 55'	Stadium: Ajman Stadium; Attendance: 2,400; Referee: Ali Al Mulla

18 February 2010 15	Al Ain	0–1	Al Jazira	Al Ain
20:15 GMT+4 (UAE Time)		Report	Juma .A 87'	Stadium: Khalifa bin Zayed; Attendance: 11,863; Referee: Fareed Al-Marzouqi

14 March 2010 16	Al Shabab	2–5	Al Ain	Dubai
17:40 GMT+4 (UAE Time)	Suroor .S 10'; Renato 72'	Report	Sand 1', 47', 88' (pen.); Fares .J 32'; Abdulaziz .F 68'	Stadium: Al Maktoum Stadium; Referee: Mohamed Al-Zarouni

18 March 2010 17	Al Dhafra	2–1	Al Ain	Madinat Zayed
17:55 GMT+4 (UAE Time)	Hamad .A 10'; Lawal 87'	Report	Sand 8'	Stadium: Hamdan Bin Zayed; Attendance: 2,217; Referee: Mohamed Omar

9 April 2010 18	Al Ain	0–1	Al Wahda	Al Ain
20:30 GMT+4 (UAE Time)		Report	I. Matar 39'	Stadium: Khalifa bin Zayed; Attendance: 11,371; Referee: Ali Al-Badwawi

22 April 2010 19	Al Wasl	1–3	Al Ain	Dubai
18:00 GMT+4 (UAE Time)	Tariq .H 59'	Report	Saif .M 20'; Sand 69' (pen.); Valdivia 88'	Stadium: Zabeel Stadium; Referee: Ammar Al-Jeneibi

2 May 2010 20	Al Ain	5–3	Emirates	Al Ain
19:35 GMT+4 (UAE Time)	Sand 10', 19' (pen.), 47'; Shehab .A 26'; Omar .A 75'; Fawzi .F (red card) 83'	Report	Kerkar 1'; Al Dawoodi 45'; Enayati 69'	Stadium: Khalifa bin Zayed; Referee: Fareed Al-Marzouqi

7 May 2010 21	Al Ain	3–1	Baniyas	Al Ain
19:35 GMT+4 (UAE Time)	Abdulaziz .F 5'; A. Malallah 35'; Sand 56'	Report	Senghor 65'	Stadium: Khalifa bin Zayed; Attendance: 1,162; Referee: Ammar Al-Jeneibi

16 May 2010 22	Sharjah	1–1	Al Ain	Sharjah
19:40 GMT+4 (UAE Time)	N. Mubarak 30'	Report	Fawzi .F 40'	Stadium: Sharjah Stadium; Referee: Yaqoub Al Hammadi

=== UAE League Cup ===
==== Group B ====
Pos	Team	Pld	W	D	L	GF	GA	GD	Pts	AIN	AJM	YAS	SHA
1	Al Ain	6	4	1	1	9	8	+1	13		3–1	1–1	1–0
2	Ajman	6	3	1	2	14	9	+5	10	4–0		3–1	5–3
3	Baniyas	6	3	1	2	10	5	+5	10	0–1	2–1		1–0
4	Al Shabab	6	0	1	5	6	15	−9	1	2–3	0–0	1–5	

Source: Standings and Matches
Legend: Blue = home team win; Yellow = draw; Red = away team win.
Rules for classification: 1) points; 2) goal difference; 3) number of goals scored.

8 October 2009 1	Al Shabab	2–3	Al Ain	Dubai
16:00	Pedrão 59'; N. Masoud 83'	(Report)	I. Ahmed 19'; Hazza .S 75'; Emerson 88'	Stadium: Al Maktoum Stadium

13 November 2009 2	Al Ain	3–1	Ajman	Al Ain
12:45	Sand 60'; Mohammed .A 70'; Saif .M 93'	(Report)	Kabi 14'	Stadium: Khalifa bin Zayed

13 December 2009 3	Baniyas	0–1	Al Ain	Al Ain
16:00		(Report)	Hazza .S 5'	Stadium: Tahnoun bin Mohammed

30 December 2009 4	Al Ain	1–1	Baniyas	Al Ain
12:55	Ahmed. K 84'	(Report)	T. Awana 42'	Stadium: Khalifa bin Zayed

19 January 2010 5	Al Ain	1–0	Al Shabab	Al Ain
13:00	Sand 45'	(Report)		Stadium: Khalifa bin Zayed

28 February 2010 6	Al Ain	0–4	Ajman	Al Ain
16:30		(Report)	Kader 10', 83', 89'; Mubarek .S 60'	Stadium: Khalifa bin Zayed

==== Semi-finals ====
4 March 2010 First leg	Ajman	1–1	Al Ain	Ajman
20:30 GMT+4 (UAE Time)	Kabi 71'	Report	Sand 34'	Stadium: Ajman Stadium; Referee: Fahad Al-Kassar

27 March 2010 Second leg	Al Ain	3–3 (4–4(a) agg.)	Ajman	Al Ain
13:45	Sand 42', 65'; I. Ahmed 53'; Valdivia (red card) 90+4'	Report	Kader 23', 60', 94'	Stadium: Khalifa bin Zayed; Referee: Fareed Al-Marzouqi

=== UAE President's Cup ===
24 November 2009 Round of 16	Ajman	0–0 (a.e.t.) (4–3 p)	Al Ain	Dubai
16:40 GMT+4 (UAE Time)		Report; Report		Stadium: Rashid Stadium; Referee: Hamad Al Shaikh
	Penalties
	Mohamed .S (penalty scored); Jasem .A (penalty missed); Salem .O (penalty scored); Ali .K (penalty scored); Najmi (penalty scored)		(penalty scored) Shehab .A; (penalty missed) Saif .M; (penalty scored) Moadhed; (penalty missed) Mohammed .A; (penalty scored) Sand

=== 2010 AFC Champions League ===
==== Group stage ====
===== Group D =====
Pos	Team	Pld	W	D	L	GF	GA	GD	Pts	Qualification
1	(Saudi Arabia) Al-Shabab	6	3	1	2	10	8	+2	10	Advance to knockout stage
2	(Uzbekistan) Pakhtakor	6	3	0	3	8	10	−2	9	Advance to knockout stage
3	(Iran) Sepahan	6	2	2	2	5	5	0	8	
4	(United Arab Emirates) Al-Ain	6	2	1	3	8	8	0	7	

Source: AFC Champions League Official Page

24 February 2010	Al Ain (United Arab Emirates)	0–1	(Uzbekistan) Pakhtakor	Al Ain
19:20 (UTC+4)		Report	Gevorkyan 60'	Stadium: Khalifa bin Zayed; Attendance: 6,405; Referee: Sun Baojie (China)

10 March 2010	Sepahan (Iran)	0–0	(United Arab Emirates) Al Ain	Isfahan
17:00 (UTC+3:30)		Report		Stadium: Foolad Shahr Stadium; Attendance: 8,000; Referee: Abdul Malik Bashir (Singapore)

23 March 2010	Al Ain (United Arab Emirates)	2–1	(Saudi Arabia) Al-Shabab	Al Ain
19:30 (UTC+4)	Emerson 15'; Sand 24'; Valdivia (red card) 72'	Report	Al-Saran 45'	Stadium: Khalifa bin Zayed; Attendance: 4,607; Referee: Kim Dong-Jin (Korea Republic)

31 March 2010	Al-Shabab (Saudi Arabia)	3–2	(United Arab Emirates) Al Ain	Riyadh
20:30 (UTC+3)	Amado 12', 66'; Camacho 83'	Report	Sand 31'; Neda 56' (o.g.)	Stadium: King Fahd International Stadium; Attendance: 1,000; Referee: Mohsen Basma (Syria)

13 April 2010	Pakhtakor (Uzbekistan)	3–2	(United Arab Emirates) Al Ain	Tashkent
18:00 (UTC+5)	Ahmedov 9', 12', 29'	Report	Valdivia 2'; Suyunov 20' (o.g.)	Stadium: Pakhtakor Markaziy Stadium; Attendance: 14,600; Referee: Matthew Breeze (Australia)

27 April 2010	Al Ain (United Arab Emirates)	2–0	(Iran) Sepahan	Al Ain
19:50 (UTC+4)	Sand 43' (pen.), 71'	Report		Stadium: Khalifa bin Zayed; Attendance: 1,543; Referee: Hiroyoshi Takayama (Japan)

== Statistics ==
=== Goalscorers ===
As of 16 May 2010

Includes all competitive matches. The list is sorted alphabetically by surname when total goals are equal.

Rank	Pos.	Player	Pro League	President's Cup	League Cup	Champions League	Total
1	FW	(Argentina) José Sand	24		5	4	33
2	FW	(Brazil) Emerson Sheik	9		1	1	11
3	MF	(Chile) Jorge Valdivia	3			1	4
4	MF	(United Arab Emirates) Abdullah Malallah	3				3
4	FW	(United Arab Emirates) Mohammed Abdulrahman	2		1		3
4	DF	(United Arab Emirates) Ismail Ahmed	1		2		3
4	MF	(United Arab Emirates) Saif Mohammed	1		1		2
4	MF	(United Arab Emirates) Shehab Ahmed	2				2
4	MF	(United Arab Emirates) Ahmed Khamis	1		1		2
4	FW	(United Arab Emirates) Abdulaziz Fayez	2				2
4	MF	(United Arab Emirates) Salem Abdullah	2				2
4	DF	(United Arab Emirates) Hazza Salem			2		2
4	DF	(United Arab Emirates) Mohanad Salem	1				1
4	DF	(United Arab Emirates) Fares Jumaa	1				1
4	MF	(United Arab Emirates) Omar Abdulrahman	1				1
4	MF	(United Arab Emirates) Ali Al-Wehaibi	1				1
4	DF	(United Arab Emirates) Fawzi Fayez	1				1
4	MF	(United Arab Emirates) Hilal Saeed	1				1
Own goals (from the opponents)			1			2	3
Totals			57	0	13	8	78
