= Egypt national football team results =

The Egypt national football team has been competing in international matches since 1920, as such the results are listed on multiple pages:

- Egypt national football team results (1920–59)
- Egypt national football team results (1960–79)
- Egypt national football team results (1980–99)
- Egypt national football team results (2000–19)
- Egypt national football team results (2020–39)
- Egypt national football team results (unofficial matches)

== See also ==
- Egypt national football team
