= Egypt national football team results (1980–1999) =

- Win Draw Loss

This is a list of the Egypt national football team results from 1980 to 1999.

== 1990s ==
=== 1995 ===
2 January Friendly	Tunisia	2–0	Egypt	Sousse, Tunisia
--:-- WAT (UTC+1)	Chihi 28'; Baya 35'	Report		Stadium: Stade Olympique de Sousse; Attendance: 15,000; Referee: Mohamed Al Habib (Libya)

8 January 1996 African Cup of Nations qualification	Algeria	1–0	Egypt	Algiers, Algeria
--:-- WAT (UTC+1)	Dziri 16' (pen.)	Report		Stadium: Stade du 5 Juillet; Attendance: 60,000; Referee: Falla N'Doye (Senegal)

21 January 1996 African Cup of Nations qualification	Uganda	0–0	Egypt	Kampala, Uganda
--:-- EAT (UTC+3)		Report		Stadium: Nakivubo Stadium; Attendance: 10,000

26 March Friendly	Lebanon	1–1	Egypt	Beirut, Lebanon
--:-- EEST (UTC+3)	?? (??)	Report	El Kass 35'	Stadium: Beirut Municipal Stadium

7 April 1996 African Cup of Nations qualification	Egypt	3–1	Sudan	Alexandria, Egypt
--:-- CAST (UTC+3)	Abou El Dahab 10'; El Sawy 70'; El Kass 88'	Report	Gildo 71'	Stadium: Alexandria Stadium; Attendance: 35,000; Referee: Said Belqola (Morocco)

14 April Friendly	Egypt	1–0	Tunisia	Port Said, Egypt
--:-- CAST (UTC+3)	H. Hassan 38'	Report		Stadium: Port Said Stadium; Attendance: 10,000

22 April 1996 African Cup of Nations qualification	Tanzania	1–2	Egypt	Dar es Salaam, Tanzania
--:-- EAT (UTC+3)	Selemani 89'	Report	Abou El Dahab 27', 68'	Stadium: National Stadium; Attendance: 35,000

18 May Friendly	Morocco	0–0	Egypt	Marrakesh, Morocco
--:-- WEST (UTC+1)		Report		Stadium: El Harti Stadium; Attendance: 15,000

4 June 1996 African Cup of Nations qualification	Ethiopia	0–2	Egypt	Addis Ababa, Ethiopia
--:-- EAT (UTC+3)		Report	Abou El Dahab 7'; Khashaba 38'	Stadium: Addis Ababa Stadium; Attendance: 30,000; Referee: Badibake Cinji (Zaire)

14 July 1996 African Cup of Nations qualification	Egypt	1–1	Algeria	Cairo, Egypt
--:-- CAST (UTC+3)	El Masry 61'	Report	Kaci-Saïd 42'	Stadium: Cairo International Stadium; Attendance: 100,000

30 July 1996 African Cup of Nations qualification	Egypt	6–0	Uganda	Alexandria, Egypt
--:-- CAST (UTC+3)	El Kass 4', 65', 73'; Sary 8', 43'; M. Abou Grisha 36'	Report		Stadium: Alexandria Stadium; Attendance: 50,000; Referee: Cherif Boubacar Mbaye (Senegal)

22 November Friendly	Egypt	2–2	Zimbabwe	Pretoria, South Africa
--:-- SAST (UTC+2)	Maher 15', 58'	Report	Sibanda 31'; Mugeyi 48'	Stadium: Loftus Versfeld Stadium; Attendance: 20,000; Referee: George Mwale (Zambia)

24 November Friendly	South Africa	2–0	Egypt	Mafikeng, South Africa
--:-- SAST (UTC+2)	Mkhalele 14'; Bartlett 17'	Report		Stadium: Mmabatho Stadium; Attendance: 20,000; Referee: Antony Mangiwanza (Zimbabwe)

26 November Friendly	Egypt	3–1	Zambia	Johannesburg, South Africa
--:-- SAST (UTC+2)	El Kass 21'; Maher 44', 62'	Report	Tembo 65'	Stadium: FNB Stadium; Attendance: 30,000

29 December Friendly	Egypt	1–2	Ghana	Cairo, Egypt
--:-- CAT (UTC+2)	El Kass 7'	Report	?? (??); ?? (??)	Stadium: Cairo International Stadium; Attendance: 15,000

=== 1996 ===
8 January Friendly	Egypt	2–1	Tunisia	Ismailia, Egypt
18:00 CAT (UTC+2)	Maher 1', 82'	Report	Boukadida 25'	Stadium: Ismailia Stadium; Referee: Kadry Abdel Azim (Egypt)

15 January 1996 African Cup of Nations Group A	Egypt	2–1	Angola	Johannesburg, South Africa
19:00 SAST (UTC+2)	El Kass 30', 33'	Report	Quinzinho 77'	Stadium: FNB Stadium; Attendance: 8,000; Referee: Sidi Bekaye (Mali)

18 January 1996 African Cup of Nations Group A	Cameroon	2–1	Egypt	Johannesburg, South Africa
19:00 SAST (UTC+2)	Omam-Biyik 36' (pen.); Tchami 59'	Report	Maher 48'	Stadium: FNB Stadium; Attendance: 4,000; Referee: Lim Kee Chong (Mauritius)

24 January 1996 African Cup of Nations Group A	South Africa	0–1	Egypt	Johannesburg, South Africa
17:00 SAST (UTC+2)		Report	El Kass 7'	Stadium: FNB Stadium; Attendance: 20,000; Referee: Lucien Bouchardeau (Niger)

27 January 1996 African Cup of Nations Quarter-finals	Egypt	1–3	Zambia	Bloemfontein, South Africa
20:00 SAST (UTC+2)	Kamouna 43'	Report	Litana 58'; Mutale 65'; Lota 76'	Stadium: Free State Stadium; Attendance: 8,500; Referee: Charles Masembe (Uganda)

20 March Friendly	Morocco	2–0	Egypt	Dubai, United Arab Emirates
19:00 GST (UTC+4)	El Hadrioui 9'; Ben Mahmoud 80'	Report		Stadium: Al Maktoum Stadium; Attendance: 12,000; Referee: Ali Bujsaim (United Arab Emirates)

22 March Friendly	United Arab Emirates	0–0	Egypt	Dubai, United Arab Emirates
20:00 GST (UTC+4)		Report		Stadium: Al Maktoum Stadium; Attendance: 15,000; Referee: Masayoshi Okada (Japan)

25 March Friendly	Egypt	1–1	South Korea	Dubai, United Arab Emirates
19:00 GST (UTC+4)	Koushary 87'	Report	Roh Sang-rae 88'	Stadium: Al Maktoum Stadium; Attendance: 5,000; Referee: Masayoshi Okada (Japan)

26 May Friendly	Ghana	0–2	Egypt	Accra, Ghana
17:00 GMT (UTC±0)		Report	Sary 40' (pen.); I. Youssef 90'	Stadium: Accra Sports Stadium; Attendance: 4,000; Referee: Emmanuel Okoampah (Ghana)

4 October 1998 African Cup of Nations qualification	Egypt	1–1	Morocco	Cairo, Egypt
19:00 CAT (UTC+2)	H. Hassan 88'	Report	Bassir 74'	Stadium: Cairo International Stadium; Attendance: 50,000

8 November 1998 FIFA World Cup qualification	Egypt	7–1	Namibia	Cairo, Egypt
15:15 CAT (UTC+2)	Maher 1', 15', 70'; A. Hassan 11'; I. Hassan 35'; H. Hassan 73', 84'	Report	Shivute 25'	Stadium: Cairo International Stadium; Attendance: 35,000; Referee: Sidi Bekaye (Mali)

=== 1997 ===
5 January Friendly	Egypt	2–0	Belarus	Alexandria, Egypt
19:00 CAT (UTC+2)	H. Hassan 25'; Sary 80'	Report		Stadium: Alexandria Stadium; Attendance: 10,000; Referee: Abdel Hamid Abdel Kareem (Egypt)

12 January 1998 FIFA World Cup qualification	Tunisia	1–0	Egypt	Tunis, Tunisia
14:00 WAT (UTC+1)	Baya 10'	Report		Stadium: Stade Olympique d'El Menzah; Attendance: 35,000; Referee: Masayoshi Okada (Japan)

25 January 1998 African Cup of Nations qualification	Senegal	0–0	Egypt	Dakar, Senegal
15:00 GMT (UTC±0)		Report		Stadium: Stade Léopold Sédar Senghor; Attendance: 50,000; Referee: Camara Ba (Guinea)

18 February Friendly	Kuwait	2–0	Egypt	Kuwait City, Kuwait
17:00 AST (UTC+3)	?? (??) ?? (??)	Report		Stadium: National Stadium; Attendance: 4,000; Referee: Ibrahim Al Ansari (Kuwait)

23 February 1998 African Cup of Nations qualification	Ethiopia	1–1	Egypt	Addis Ababa, Ethiopia
16:00 EAT (UTC+3)	Tesfaye 58'	Report	T. Mostafa 71'	Stadium: Addis Ababa Stadium; Attendance: 25,000; Referee: Camara Ba (Guinea)

6 April 1998 FIFA World Cup qualification	Liberia	1–0	Egypt	Accra, Ghana
15:00 GMT (UTC±0)	Weah 29'	Report		Stadium: Accra Sports Stadium; Attendance: 15,000; Referee: Zeli Sinko (Ivory Coast)

26 April 1998 FIFA World Cup qualification	Namibia	2–3	Egypt	Windhoek, Namibia
15:00 NWT (UTC+1)	Uutoni 62'; Ouseb 87' (pen.)	Report	H. Hassan 77', 89'; Khashaba 79' (pen.)	Stadium: Independence Stadium; Attendance: 6,000; Referee: Amuam Aka (Cameroon)

8 June 1998 FIFA World Cup qualification	Egypt	0–0	Tunisia	Cairo, Egypt
20:15 CAST (UTC+3)		Report		Stadium: Cairo International Stadium; Attendance: 46,000; Referee: Karim Daho (Algeria)

12 June 1997 Korea Cup	South Korea	3–1	Egypt	Seoul, South Korea
19:00 KST (UTC+9)	Park Kun-ha 12'; Yoo Sang-chul 65'; Choi Moon-sik 77'	Report	Khashaba 23'	Stadium: Seoul Olympic Stadium; Attendance: 23,830; Referee: Selearajen Subramaniam (Malaysia)

14 June 1997 Korea Cup	FR Yugoslavia	0–0	Egypt	Suwon, South Korea
19:00 KST (UTC+9)		Report		Stadium: Suwon Sports Complex Stadium; Attendance: 7,329; Referee: Kwon Jong-chul (South Korea)

16 June 1997 Korea Cup	Egypt	2–0	Ghana	Seoul, South Korea
17:00 KST (UTC+9)	Emam 14'; Sabry 80'	Report		Stadium: Seoul Olympic Stadium; Attendance: 21,563; Referee: Park Hae-yong (South Korea)

21 June 1998 African Cup of Nations qualification	Morocco	1–0	Egypt	Rabat, Morocco
21:00 WEST (UTC+1)	Bassir 71'	Report		Stadium: Prince Moulay Abdellah Stadium; Attendance: 80,000; Referee: Sidi Magassa (Mali)

13 July 1998 African Cup of Nations qualification	Egypt	2–0	Senegal	Cairo, Egypt
20:00 CAST (UTC+3)	Emam 12'; Khashaba 55' (pen.)	Report		Stadium: Cairo International Stadium; Attendance: 35,000

27 July 1998 African Cup of Nations qualification	Egypt	8–1	Ethiopia	Alexandria, Egypt
19:45 CAST (UTC+3)	Khashaba 1' (pen.); Hanafy 5'; Emam 19', 36', 44'; H. Hassan 55'; A. Hassan 62'; M. El Sayed 77'	Report	Elias 60' (pen.)	Stadium: Alexandria Stadium; Attendance: 20,000

17 August 1998 FIFA World Cup qualification	Egypt	5–0	Liberia	Cairo, Egypt
20:15 CAST (UTC+3)	Khashaba 20' (pen.); Hanafy 24'; Sabry 46'; Kamouna 68'; Emam 77'	Report		Stadium: Osman Ahmed Osman Stadium; Attendance: 35,000; Referee: Kine Tibebu (Ethiopia)

18 December Friendly	Egypt	7–2	Togo	Aswan, Egypt
18:00 CAT (UTC+2)	Sabry 4'; A. Hassan 6'; El Sakka 29'; Khashaba 39' (pen.); H. Hassan 54', 75' (pen.); Kamouna 89'	Report	?? (??) ?? (??)	Stadium: Aswan Stadium; Attendance: 10,000

20 December Friendly	Egypt	1–2	Algeria	Aswan, Egypt
19:00 CAT (UTC+2)	Khashaba 88' (pen.)	Report	Benamara 42'; Saïb 60' (pen.)	Stadium: Aswan Stadium; Attendance: 50,000

22 December Friendly	Egypt	2–0	Cameroon	Cairo, Egypt
19:15 CAT (UTC+2)	Khashaba 44'; Maher 45'	Report		Stadium: Cairo International Stadium; Attendance: 30,000

24 December Friendly	Egypt	1–2	Algeria	Cairo, Egypt
19:15 CAT (UTC+2)	Kamouna 85' (pen.)	Report	Adjali 5'; Tasfaout 57'	Stadium: Cairo International Stadium; Attendance: 25,000

=== 1998 ===
25 January 1998 King's Cup	Thailand	1–1	Egypt	Bangkok, Thailand
16:30 ICT (UTC+7)	Chalermsan (??)	Report	Salah El Din 86'	Stadium: Rajamangala Stadium; Attendance: 10,000

27 January 1998 King's Cup	South Korea	2–0	Egypt	Bangkok, Thailand
20:15 ICT (UTC+7)	Choi Yong-soo 6'; Lee Sang-yoon 42'	Report		Stadium: Rajamangala Stadium; Attendance: 15,000

31 January 1998 King's Cup Final	South Korea	1–1 (5–4 p)	Egypt	Bangkok, Thailand
17:30 ICT (UTC+7)	Choi Yong-soo 6'	Report	H. Hassan 1'	Stadium: Rajamangala Stadium; Attendance: 20,000
	Penalties
	Choi Yong-soo (penalty scored); Kim Jung-hyuk (penalty scored); Choi Young-il (penalty scored); Lee Min-sung (penalty scored); Jang Dae-il (penalty scored)		(penalty scored) Ramzy; (penalty scored) Radwan; (penalty scored) Youssef; (penalty scored) Sabry; (penalty missed) H. Hassan

10 February 1998 African Cup of Nations Group D	Egypt	2–0	Mozambique	Bobo-Dioulasso, Burkina Faso
18:00 GMT (UTC±0)	H. Hassan 14', 44'	Report		Stadium: Stade Omnisports de Bobo-Dioulasso; Attendance: 20,000; Referee: Mamadouba Camara (Guinea)

13 February 1998 African Cup of Nations Group D	Egypt	4–0	Zambia	Bobo-Dioulasso, Burkina Faso
17:00 GMT (UTC±0)	H. Hassan 34', 57', 71'; Radwan 80'	Report		Stadium: Stade Omnisports de Bobo-Dioulasso; Attendance: 5,000; Referee: Kim Milton Nielsen (Denmark)

17 February 1998 African Cup of Nations Group D	Morocco	1–0	Egypt	Ouagadougou, Burkina Faso
16:00 GMT (UTC±0)	Hadji 90'	Report		Stadium: Stade Municipal; Attendance: 500; Referee: Kim Milton Nielsen (Denmark)

21 February 1998 African Cup of Nations Quarter-finals	Ivory Coast	0–0 (a.e.t.) (4–5 p)	Egypt	Ouagadougou, Burkina Faso
20:00 GMT (UTC±0)		Report		Stadium: Stade Municipal; Attendance: 20,000; Referee: Ian McLeod (South Africa)
	Penalties
	Domoraud (penalty scored); Guel (penalty scored); Diomandé (penalty missed); Bakayoko (penalty scored); Ouattara (penalty scored)		(penalty scored) Ramzy; (penalty scored) Radwan; (penalty scored) Kamouna; (penalty scored) T. Mostafa; (penalty scored) Emam

25 February 1998 African Cup of Nations Semi-finals	Burkina Faso	0–2	Egypt	Bobo-Dioulasso, Burkina Faso
20:00 GMT (UTC±0)		Report	H. Hassan 40', 71'	Stadium: Stade Omnisports de Bobo-Dioulasso; Attendance: 40,000; Referee: Kim Milton Nielsen (Denmark)

28 February 1998 African Cup of Nations Final	South Africa	0–2	Egypt	Ouagadougou, Burkina Faso
16:00 GMT (UTC±0)		Report	A. Hassan 5'; T. Mostafa 13'	Stadium: Stade du 4 Août; Attendance: 40,000; Referee: Said Belqola (Morocco)

16 September Friendly	Egypt	0–0	Ivory Coast	Cairo, Egypt
20:00 CAST (UTC+3)		Report		Stadium: Cairo International Stadium

23 September Friendly	Estonia	2–2	Egypt	Tallinn, Estonia
20:45 EEST (UTC+3)	Kirs 29'; Zelinski 43'	Report	Emam 77'; H. Hassan 87'	Stadium: Kadriorg Stadium; Attendance: 2,500; Referee: Romāns Lajuks (Latvia)

29 September Friendly	Macedonia	2–2	Egypt	Kumanovo, Macedonia
20:45 CEST (UTC+2)	Šainovski (??); Zaharievski (??)	Report	H. Hassan 84'; Nabieh 88'	Stadium: Gradski Stadium Kumanovo; Attendance: 5,500; Referee: Slavko Radulovic (FR Yugoslavia)

28 October Friendly	Japan	1–0	Egypt	Osaka, Japan
19:15 JST (UTC+9)	Nakayama 25' (pen.)	Report		Stadium: Osaka Nagai Stadium; Attendance: 47,996; Referee: Kim Young-joo (South Korea)

18 November Friendly	Egypt	1–1	Norway	Cairo, Egypt
20:00 CAT (UTC+2)	H. Hassan 39'	Report	Flo 63'	Stadium: Cairo International Stadium; Attendance: 25,000; Referee: Abdul Rahman Al Zaid (Saudi Arabia)

16 December 1998 Nelson Mandela Challenge	South Africa	2–1	Egypt	Johannesburg, South Africa
19:00 SAST (UTC+2)	McCarthy 40', 74'	Report	H. Hassan 34'	Stadium: Soccer City; Attendance: 30,000; Referee: Felix Tangawarima (Zimbabwe)

=== 1999 ===
16 February 1999 Lunar New Year Cup Semi-finals	Egypt	3–1	Bulgaria	So Kon Po, Hong Kong
18:00 HKT (UTC+8)	H. Hassan 11', 31'; Emam 81'	Report	Yovov 88'	Stadium: Hong Kong Stadium

19 February 1999 Lunar New Year Cup Final	Mexico	3–0	Egypt	So Kon Po, Hong Kong
20:15 HKT (UTC+8)	Márquez 34'; Abundis 43'; Hernández 88' (pen.)	Report		Stadium: Hong Kong Stadium

30 March Friendly	Belgium	0–1	Egypt	Liège, Belgium
20:45 CEST (UTC+2)		Report	Emam 13'	Stadium: Stade Maurice Dufrasne; Attendance: 18,612; Referee: Dominique Tavel (Switzerland)

13 June 1999 Korea Cup	Croatia	2–2	Egypt	Seoul, South Korea
19:00 KST (UTC+9)	Cvitanović 45' (pen.); Vugrinec 77'	Report	H. Hassan 9'; Rayyan 34'	Stadium: Dongdaemun Stadium; Attendance: 6,900; Referee: Ahn Bong-ki (South Korea)

15 June 1999 Korea Cup	South Korea	0–0	Egypt	Seoul, South Korea
19:00 KST (UTC+9)		Report		Stadium: Seoul Olympic Stadium; Attendance: 37,000; Referee: Tajaddin Fares (Syria)

18 June 1999 Korea Cup	Mexico	2–0	Egypt	Seoul, South Korea
19:00 KST (UTC+9)	Osorno 2', 88'	Report		Stadium: Dongdaemun Stadium; Attendance: 6,400; Referee: Park Hae-yong (South Korea)

29 June Friendly	Zimbabwe	1–1	Egypt	Harare, Zimbabwe
16:00 CAT (UTC+2)	?? (??)	Report	Emam 52'	Stadium: National Sports Stadium

10 July Friendly	Egypt	1–1	New Zealand	Mexico City, Mexico
14:30 CDT (UTC−5)	Emam (??)	Report	Ngata (??)	Stadium: Campo de Entrenamiento Club Necaxa

15 July Friendly	Egypt	1–0	New Zealand	Guadalajara, Mexico
16:00 CDT (UTC−5)	I. Hassan (??)	Report		Stadium: Campo de Entrenamiento Las Chivas

25 July 1999 FIFA Confederations Cup Group A	Bolivia	2–2	Egypt	Mexico City, Mexico
12:00 CDT (UTC−5)	Gutiérrez 21'; Ribera 40'	Report	Sabry 8'; Radwan 63'	Stadium: Estadio Azteca; Attendance: 85,000; Referee: Anders Frisk (Sweden)

27 July 1999 FIFA Confederations Cup Group A	Mexico	2–2	Egypt	Mexico City, Mexico
20:30 CDT (UTC−5)	Pardo 15'; Abundis 21'	Report	A. Hassan 79'; Kamouna 85'	Stadium: Estadio Azteca; Attendance: 65,000; Referee: Kim Young-joo (South Korea)

29 July 1999 FIFA Confederations Cup Group A	Egypt	1–5	Saudi Arabia	Mexico City, Mexico
18:00 CDT (UTC−5)	Kamouna 70' (pen.)	Report	Al Otaibi 8', 34', 78', 85'; Al Shahrani 64'	Stadium: Estadio Azteca; Attendance: 15,000; Referee: Ubaldo Aquino (Paraguay)

12 November Friendly	Egypt	1–2	Ghana	Cairo, Egypt
19:00 CAT (UTC+2)	Emara 60'	Report	K. Ayew 44'; Ahinful (??)	Stadium: Cairo International Stadium; Attendance: 24,000

15 November Friendly	Namibia	0–1	Egypt	Windhoek, Namibia
16:00 CAT (UTC+2)		Report	Khashaba (??)	Stadium: Independence Stadium; Attendance: 7,000
