= Egypt national football team results (unofficial matches) =

- Win Draw Loss

This is a list of the Egypt national football team results from 1996 to the present day that, for various reasons, are not accorded the status of official International A Matches.

== 1919 ==
21 April 1919 British Inter-Theatre of War Championship 1919	Home Forces (United Kingdom)	2–4	Egypt	Aldershot, England
		Report

25 April 1919 British Inter-Theatre of War Championship 1919	India	1–0	Egypt	Aldershot, England
		Report

1 May 1919 British Inter-Theatre of War Championship 1919 Final	British Expeditionary Force (France)	1–0	Egypt	London, England
		Report		Stadium: Stamford Bridge

== 1990s ==
31 March 1995 Friendly	Syria	2–1	Egypt	Damascus, Syria
--:-- EEST (UTC+3)	Harba 23'; Khalifa 81' (pen.)	Report	H. Hassan 62'	Stadium: ??

2 April 1995 Friendly	Syria U23	2–2	Egypt	Damascus, Syria
--:-- EEST (UTC+3)	El Rahawy 2'; Khaddar 46'	Report	El Sawy 39'; El Masry 86'	Stadium: ??

4 July 1995 Friendly	Syria	1–1	Egypt	Damascus, Syria
--:-- EEST (UTC+3)	Taleb (??)	Report	El Kass 14'	Stadium: ??

9 July 1995 Friendly	Syria	1–1	Egypt	Damascus, Syria
--:-- EEST (UTC+3)	Al Boushi 58'	Report	Salah El Din 37' (pen.)	Stadium: ??

1 November 1996 Friendly	Egypt	0–0	Mali	Cairo, Egypt
19:00 CAT (UTC+2)		Report		Stadium: Cairo International Stadium

20 December 1996 Friendly	Egypt	3–1	Romania	Cairo, Egypt
18:45 CAT (UTC+2)	Abdel Maguid 68', 90'; H. Hassan 81'	Report	Dănciulescu 71'	Stadium: Cairo International Stadium; Attendance: 20,000

3 December 1997 Friendly	Egypt	3–2	Ghana	Cairo, Egypt
19:00 CAT (UTC+2)	Kamouna 25'; Emam 39'; Khashaba 60' (pen.)	Report	?? (??) ?? (??)	Stadium: Cairo International Stadium; Attendance: 25,000

29 January 1998 1998 King's Cup	Egypt	2–0	Denmark U21	Bangkok, Thailand
16:30 ICT (UTC+7)	H. Hassan (??); Tur (??)	Report		Stadium: Rajamangala Stadium; Attendance: 12,000

27 December 1998 Friendly	Kuwait	1–1	Egypt	Kuwait City, Kuwait
18:00 AST (UTC+3)	Youssef 8'	Report	H. Hassan 47'	Stadium: Al Sadaqua Wal Salam Stadium; Attendance: 25,000

20 July 1999 Friendly	United States	4–3	Egypt	Guadalajara, Mexico
17:00 CDT (UTC−5)	?? (??); ?? (??); ?? (??); ?? (??)	Report	A. Hassan (??); Bassiouny (??); Ramzy (??)	Stadium: Campo de Entrenamiento Las Chivas

== 2000s ==
19 January 2001 Friendly	Egypt	1–1 (3–4 p)	Italy U21	Tehran, Iran
20:00 IRST (UTC+3:30)	H. Hassan 85'	Report	Areono 72' (pen.)	Stadium: Azadi Stadium; Attendance: 15,000
	Penalties
	I. Said (penalty scored); A. Hassan (penalty missed); M. Youssef (penalty missed); Ramzy (penalty scored); Emam (penalty scored)		(penalty scored) ??; (penalty scored) ??; (penalty scored) ??; (penalty missed) ??; (penalty scored) ??

29 December 2005 2005 LG Cup Final	Egypt	4–2	Senegal	Cairo, Egypt
20:00 CAT (UTC+2)	H. Mostafa 14'; Moteab 22'; Zaki 86', 90+3'	Report	Mendy 2'; Konaté 50'	Stadium: Cairo International Stadium

13 November 2007 2007 Pan Arab Games	Egypt	3–0	United Arab Emirates	Port Said, Egypt
21:15 CAT (UTC+2)	Moawad 58', 67'; O. Hosny 80'	Report		Stadium: Port Said Stadium

16 November 2007 2007 Pan Arab Games	Egypt	5–0	Sudan	Ismailia, Egypt
21:15 CAT (UTC+2)	Salama 2'; Moteab 3', 50', 63', 76'	Report		Stadium: Ismailia Stadium

== 2010s ==
28 December 2012 Friendly	Qatar	0–2	Egypt	Al Rayyan, Qatar
19:30 AST (UTC+3)		Report	S. Hamdy 28'; Gedo 57'	Stadium: Thani bin Jassim Stadium

22 March 2013 Friendly	Egypt	10–0	Swaziland	Alexandria, Egypt
18:00 CAT (UTC+2)	M. Ibrahim 5'; M. Salah 12', 44'; Abdel Malek 46', 78' (pen.); Mekky 61', 89'; Hamoudi 63'; A. Gaafar 71', 90+2'	Report		Stadium: Borg El Arab Stadium

30 September 2013 Friendly	Egypt	2–0	Uganda	Cairo, Egypt
19:00 CAT (UTC+2)	Abdel Malek 7'; Emam II 68'	Report		Stadium: 30 June Stadium; Referee: Badr Abdel Gadir (Sudan)

2 October 2013 Friendly	Egypt	3–0	Uganda	Cairo, Egypt
16:00 CAT (UTC+2)	Abdel Malek 29'; Abdel Shafy 76'; A. Samir 86'	Report		Stadium: 30 June Stadium; Referee: Badr Abdel Gadir (Sudan)

14 November 2013 Friendly	Egypt	2–0	Zambia	Cairo, Egypt
18:00 CAT (UTC+2)	Zaki 8'; Rabia 28'	Report		Stadium: 30 June Stadium; Referee: Fahad Al Kassar (United Arab Emirates)

30 August 2014 Friendly	Egypt	1–0	Kenya	Aswan, Egypt
21:00 CAST (UTC+3)	Gamal 55'	Report		Stadium: Aswan Stadium; Referee: Mohammed Abdulla Hassan (United Arab Emirates)

13 May 2017 Friendly	Egypt	1–0	Yemen	Cairo, Egypt
16:45 CAT (UTC+2)	Hesham 33'	Report		Stadium: Cairo International Stadium; Attendance: 300; Referee: Mahmoud Bassiouny (Egypt)

5 June 2017 Friendly	Egypt	1–0	Libya	Cairo, Egypt
22:00 CAT (UTC+2)	Abdel Hakim 33'	Report		Stadium: Petro Sport Stadium; Attendance: 100; Referee: Mahmoud El Banna (Egypt)
