= Nasser Masoud =

Emirati footballer (born 1986)

Personal information
- Full name: Nasser Masoud Rashid Ali Al Abri
- Date of birth: 6 March 1986 (age 40)
- Place of birth: United Arab Emirates
- Height: 1.79 m (5 ft 10 1/2 in)
- Position: Winger

Youth career
- Al Jazira

Senior career*
Years	Team	Apps	(Gls)
2006–2009	Al Jazira		
2009–2017	Al Shabab		
2021–2022	Al Dhaid		
- * Club domestic league appearances and goals

Nasser Masoud (Arabic: ناصر مسعود; born 6 March 1986) is an Emirati footballer who played as a winger.
