= Ahmed Moadhed =

Emirati footballer (born 1980)

Ahmed Meadhad
Personal information
- Full name: Ahmed Ali Moadhed Al Samahi
- Date of birth: 13 December 1980 (age 45)
- Place of birth: United Arab Emirates
- Height: 1.76 m (5 ft 9 1/2 in)
- Position: Midfielder

Senior career*
Years	Team	Apps	(Gls)
2001–2007	Al-Fujairah		
2007–2010	Al Ain		
2010–2013	Al-Ahli		
2013–2016	Al-Fujairah		
2018	Masafi		
- * Club domestic league appearances and goals

Ahmed Ali Moadhed Al Samahi (born 13 December 1980) is an Emarati footballer.

Moadhed play all six matches at 2010 AFC Champions League.
