= Salem Obaid =

Emirati association football player (born 1983)

Salem Obaid سالم عبيد
Personal information
- Full name: Salem Obaid Syif Al-Al Meqbali
- Date of birth: 11 March 1983 (age 43)
- Place of birth: Emirates
- Height: 1.83 m (6 ft 0 in)
- Position: Defender

Youth career
- Al Urooba

Senior career*
Years	Team	Apps	(Gls)
2004–2005	Al Urooba		
2006–2008	Al-Fujairah		
2008–2013	Ajman		
2013–2015	Al-Fujairah		
2015–2016	Al Urooba		
2016–2017	Ras Al Khaimah		
2017–2018	Ajman		
2018–2019	Dibba Al-Hisn		
- * Club domestic league appearances and goals

Salem Obaid (Arabic:سالم عبيد) (born 11 March 1983) is an Emirati footballer who plays as a defender.

== Career ==
He formerly played for Al Urooba, Al-Fujairah, Ajman, Ras Al Khaimah, and Dibba Al-Hisn.
