= Jasem Ali =

Emirati association football player (born 1986)

Jasem Ali جاسم علي
Personal information
- Full name: Jasem Ali Mohammed Faqir Al-Bloushi
- Date of birth: 2 May 1986 (age 40)
- Place of birth: Emirates
- Height: 1.72 m (5 ft 8 in)
- Position: Defensive midfielder

Youth career
- Ajman

Senior career*
Years	Team	Apps	(Gls)
2005–2018	Ajman		
- * Club domestic league appearances and goals

Jasem Ali (Arabic:جاسم علي) (born 2 May 1986) is an Emirati footballer who played as a defensive midfielder for Ajman .

== Career ==
He played throughout his history at Ajman Club until his retirement.
