= Suroor Salim =

Emirati association football player (born 1982)

Suroor Salim سرور سالم
Personal information
- Full name: Suroor Salim Rubaya Othman Khuwaidem Mubarak
- Date of birth: 14 August 1982 (age 44)
- Place of birth: Emirates
- Position: Winger

Youth career
- Al-Shabab

Senior career*
Years	Team	Apps	(Gls)
2004–2012	Al-Shabab		
2012–2013	Emirates Club		
- * Club domestic league appearances and goals

Suroor Salim (Arabic: سرور سالم) (born 14 August 1982) is an Emirati footballer. He currently plays as a winger .

== Career ==
He formerly played for Al-Shabab, and Emirates Club.
