= Egypt national football team results (2020–present) =

- Win Draw Loss

This is a list of the Egypt national football team results scheduled to be played in 2020 or later.

== 2020s ==
=== 2020 ===
14 November 2021 Africa Cup of Nations qualification	Egypt	1–0	Togo	Cairo, Egypt
21:00 CAT (UTC+2)	Mah. Hamdy 53'	Report		Stadium: Cairo International Stadium; Referee: Louis Hakizimana (Rwanda)

17 November 2021 Africa Cup of Nations qualification	Togo	1–3	Egypt	Lomé, Togo
17:00 GMT (UTC±0)	Nya-Vedji 90+3'	Report	Magdy 18'; Sherif 32'; Trézéguet 52'	Stadium: Stade de Kégué; Referee: Issa Sy (Senegal)

=== 2021 ===
25 March 2021 Africa Cup of Nations qualification	Kenya	1–1	Egypt	Nairobi, Kenya
19:00 EAT (UTC+3)	Abdallah 65'	Report	Magdy 2'	Stadium: Nyayo National Stadium; Referee: Thando Ndzandzeka (South Africa)

29 March 2021 Africa Cup of Nations qualification	Egypt	4–0	Comoros	Cairo, Egypt
18:00 CAT (UTC+2)	El Neny 15'; Sherif 17'; Salah 21', 25'	Report		Stadium: Cairo International Stadium; Referee: Boubou Traoré (Mali)

1 September 2022 FIFA World Cup qualification	Egypt	1–0	Angola	Cairo, Egypt
21:00 CAT (UTC+2)	Magdy 5' (pen.)	Report		Stadium: 30 June Stadium; Referee: Boubou Traoré (Mali)

5 September 2022 FIFA World Cup qualification	Gabon	1–1	Egypt	Franceville, Gabon
20:00 WAT (UTC+1)	Allevinah 73'	Report	M. Mohamed 90'	Stadium: Stade de Franceville; Attendance: 0 Referee: Bakary Gassama (Gambia)

30 September Friendly	Egypt	2–0	Liberia	Alexandria, Egypt
21:00 CAT (UTC+2)	Sherif 58', 67'	Report		Stadium: Borg El Arab Stadium; Referee: Youssef Essrayri (Tunisia)

8 October 2022 FIFA World Cup qualification	Egypt	1–0	Libya	Alexandria, Egypt
21:00 CAT (UTC+2)	Marmoush 49'	Report		Stadium: Borg El Arab Stadium; Referee: Pacifique Ndabihawenimana (Burundi)

11 October 2022 FIFA World Cup qualification	Libya	0–3	Egypt	Benghazi, Libya
21:00 CAT (UTC+2)		Report	Fatouh 40'; M. Mohamed 45+4'; Ramadan 72'	Stadium: Benina Martyrs Stadium; Referee: Victor Gomes (South Africa)

12 November 2022 FIFA World Cup qualification	Angola	2–2	Egypt	Luanda, Angola
20:00 WAT (UTC+1)	Costa 25'; Nzola 35' (pen.)	Report	El Neny 45+1'; Tawfik 59'	Stadium: Estádio 11 de Novembro; Referee: Jean-Jacques Ndala (DR Congo)

16 November 2022 FIFA World Cup qualification	Egypt	2–1	Gabon	Alexandria, Egypt
15:00 CAT (UTC+2)	Magdy 4' (pen.); Obiang 75' (o.g.)	Report	Allevinah 54'	Stadium: Borg El Arab Stadium; Referee: Georges Gatogato (Burundi)

1 December 2021 FIFA Arab Cup Group D	Egypt	1–0	Lebanon	Doha, Qatar
16:00 AST (UTC+3)	Magdy 71' (pen.)	Report		Stadium: Al Thumama Stadium; Attendance: 11,757; Referee: Daniel Siebert (Germany)

4 December 2021 FIFA Arab Cup Group D	Sudan	0–5	Egypt	Doha, Qatar
19:00 AST (UTC+3)		Report	Refaat 4'; Zizo 13' (pen.); Mah. Hamdy 31'; Faisal 57'; Sherif 80'	Stadium: Stadium 974; Attendance: 14,464; Referee: Matthew Conger (New Zealand)

7 December 2021 FIFA Arab Cup Group D	Algeria	1–1	Egypt	Al Wakrah, Qatar
22:00 AST (UTC+3)	Tougai 20'	Report	El Solia 60' (pen.)	Stadium: Al Janoub Stadium; Attendance: 32,418; Referee: Facundo Tello (Argentina)

11 December 2021 FIFA Arab Cup Quarter-finals	Egypt	3–1 (a.e.t.)	Jordan	Al Wakrah, Qatar
18:00 AST (UTC+3)	Mar. Hamdy 45+1'; Refaat 100'; Dawoud 119'	Report	Al-Naimat 12'	Stadium: Al Janoub Stadium; Attendance: 28,306; Referee: Said Martínez (Honduras)

15 December 2021 FIFA Arab Cup Semi-finals	Tunisia	1–0	Egypt	Doha, Qatar
18:00 AST (UTC+3)	El Solia 90+5' (o.g.)	Report		Stadium: Stadium 974; Attendance: 36,427; Referee: Alireza Faghani (Iran)

18 December 2021 FIFA Arab Cup Third place play-off	Egypt	0–0 (a.e.t.) (4–5 p)	Qatar	Doha, Qatar
13:00 AST (UTC+3)		Report		Stadium: Stadium 974; Attendance: 30,978; Referee: Facundo Tello (Argentina)
	Penalties
	Magdy (penalty scored); El Solia (penalty scored); Hegazi (penalty missed); Fatouh (penalty scored); Tawfik (penalty scored); Sherif (penalty missed)		(penalty missed) Al-Haydos; (penalty scored) Khoukhi; (penalty scored) Hassan; (penalty scored) Alaaeldin; (penalty scored) Afif; (penalty scored) Boudiaf

=== 2022 ===
11 January 2021 Africa Cup of Nations Group D	Nigeria	1–0	Egypt	Garoua, Cameroon
17:00 WAT (UTC+1)	Iheanacho 30'	Report		Stadium: Roumdé Adjia Stadium; Referee: Bakary Gassama (Gambia)

15 January 2021 Africa Cup of Nations Group D	Guinea-Bissau	0–1	Egypt	Garoua, Cameroon
20:00 WAT (UTC+1)		Report	Salah 69'	Stadium: Roumdé Adjia Stadium; Referee: Pacifique Ndabihawenimana (Burundi)

19 January 2021 Africa Cup of Nations Group D	Egypt	1–0	Sudan	Yaoundé, Cameroon
20:00 WAT (UTC+1)	Abdelmonem 35'	Report		Stadium: Ahmadou Ahidjo Stadium; Referee: Joshua Bondo (Botswana)

26 January 2021 Africa Cup of Nations Round of 16	Ivory Coast	0–0 (a.e.t.) (4–5 p)	Egypt	Douala, Cameroon
17:00 WAT (UTC+1)		Report		Stadium: Japoma Stadium; Referee: Jean-Jacques Ndala (DR Congo)
	Penalties
	Pépé (penalty scored); Sangaré (penalty scored); Bailly (penalty missed); Cornet (penalty scored); Zaha (penalty scored)		(penalty scored) Zizo; (penalty scored) El Solia; (penalty scored) Kamal; (penalty scored) Abdelmonem; (penalty scored) Salah

30 January 2021 Africa Cup of Nations Quarter-finals	Egypt	2–1 (a.e.t.)	Morocco	Yaoundé, Cameroon
16:00 WAT (UTC+1)	Salah 53'; Trézéguet 100'	Report	Boufal 6' (pen.)	Stadium: Ahmadou Ahidjo Stadium; Referee: Maguette N'Diaye (Senegal)

3 February 2021 Africa Cup of Nations Semi-finals	Cameroon	0–0 (a.e.t.) (1–3 p)	Egypt	Yaoundé, Cameroon
20:00 WAT (UTC+1)		Report		Stadium: Olembe Stadium; Attendance: 24,371; Referee: Bakary Gassama (Gambia)
	Penalties
	Aboubakar (penalty scored); Moukoudi (penalty missed); Léa Siliki (penalty missed); N'Jie (penalty missed)		(penalty scored) Zizo; (penalty scored) Abdelmonem; (penalty scored) Lasheen

6 February 2021 Africa Cup of Nations Final	Senegal	0–0 (a.e.t.) (4–2 p)	Egypt	Yaoundé, Cameroon
20:00 WAT (UTC+1)		Report		Stadium: Olembe Stadium; Attendance: 48,000; Referee: Victor Gomes (South Africa)
	Penalties
	Koulibaly (penalty scored); A. Diallo (penalty scored); B. Sarr (penalty missed); B. Dieng (penalty scored); Mané (penalty scored)		(penalty scored) Zizo; (penalty missed) Abdelmonem; (penalty scored) Mar. Hamdy; (penalty missed) Lasheen

25 March 2022 FIFA World Cup qualification	Egypt	1–0	Senegal	Cairo, Egypt
19:30 CAT (UTC+2)	Ciss 4' (o.g.)	Report		Stadium: Cairo International Stadium; Attendance: 65,000; Referee: Jean-Jacques Ndala (DR Congo)

29 March 2022 FIFA World Cup qualification	Senegal	1–0 (a.e.t.) (1–1 agg.) (3–1 p)	Egypt	Dakar, Senegal
17:00 GMT (UTC±0)	Dia 3'	Report		Stadium: Diamniadio Olympic Stadium; Attendance: 50,000; Referee: Mustapha Ghorbal (Algeria)
	Penalties
	Koulibaly (penalty missed); Ciss (penalty missed); Sarr (penalty scored); Dieng (penalty scored); Mané (penalty scored)		(penalty missed) Salah; (penalty missed) Zizo; (penalty scored) El Solia; (penalty missed) M. Mohamed

5 June 2023 Africa Cup of Nations qualification	Egypt	1–0	Guinea	Cairo, Egypt
21:00 CAT (UTC+2)	M. Mohamed 87'	Report		Stadium: Cairo International Stadium; Referee: Ahmad Heeralall (Mauritius)

9 June 2023 Africa Cup of Nations qualification	Ethiopia	2–0	Egypt	Lilongwe, Malawi
18:00 CAT (UTC+2)	Hotessa 21'; Bekele 39'	Report		Stadium: Bingu National Stadium; Referee: Georges Gatogato (Burundi)

14 June Friendly	South Korea	4–1	Egypt	Seoul, South Korea
20:00 KST (UTC+9)	Hwang Ui-jo 14'; Kim Young-gwon 21'; Cho Gue-sung 85'; Kwon Chang-hoon 90+1'	Report	M. Mohamed 37'	Stadium: Seoul World Cup Stadium; Referee: Jérémie Pignard (France)

23 September Friendly	Egypt	3–0	Niger	Alexandria, Egypt
20:00 CAT (UTC+2)	Salah 43', 67' (pen.); M. Mohamed 55'	Report		Stadium: Alexandria Stadium; Referee: Sadok Selmi (Tunisia)

27 September Friendly	Egypt	3–0	Liberia	Alexandria, Egypt
20:00 CAT (UTC+2)	Marmoush 38'; Abdelmonem 57'; Hassan 90+4' (pen.)	Report		Stadium: Alexandria Stadium; Referee: Youssef Essrayri (Tunisia)

18 November Friendly	Belgium	1–2	Egypt	Kuwait City, Kuwait
18:00 AST (UTC+3)	Openda 76'	Report	M. Mohamed 33'; Trézéguet 46'	Stadium: Jaber Al Ahmad International Stadium; Referee: Ali Shaban (Kuwait)

=== 2023 ===
24 March 2023 Africa Cup of Nations qualification	Egypt	2–0	Malawi	Cairo, Egypt
21:00 CAT (UTC+2)	Salah 20'; Marmoush 45+1'	Report		Stadium: 30 June Stadium; Referee: Pierre Atcho (Gabon)

28 March 2023 Africa Cup of Nations qualification	Malawi	0–4	Egypt	Lilongwe, Malawi
15:00 CAT (UTC+2)		Report	Hamed 4'; Marmoush 16'; Salah 20'; Zizo 49'	Stadium: Bingu National Stadium; Referee: Dahane Beida (Mauritania)

14 June 2023 Africa Cup of Nations qualification	Guinea	1–2	Egypt	Marrakesh, Morocco
19:00 WAT (UTC+1)	Guirassy 26'	Report	Trézéguet 42'; M. Mohamed 79'	Stadium: Marrakesh Stadium; Referee: Daniel Nii Laryea (Ghana)
Note: The match took place at Marrakesh Stadium in Marrakesh, Morocco, instead of General Lansana Conté Stadium in Conakry, Guinea.

18 June Friendly	Egypt	3–0	South Sudan	Cairo, Egypt
20:00 CAST (UTC+3)	M. Fathi 19'; Kahraba 45'; Trézéguet 72'	Report		Stadium: Cairo International Stadium; Referee: Abdullah Jamali (Kuwait)

8 September 2023 Africa Cup of Nations qualification	Egypt	1–0	Ethiopia	Cairo, Egypt
19:00 CAST (UTC+3)	M. Fathi 37'	Report		Stadium: 30 June Stadium; Referee: Patrice Mebiame (Gabon)

12 September Friendly	Egypt	1–3	Tunisia	Cairo, Egypt
20:00 CAST (UTC+3)	Kamal 34'	Report	Laïdouni 3'; H. Fathy 8' (o.g.); Rafia 90+5'	Stadium: 30 June Stadium; Referee: Ammar Ashkanani (Kuwait)

12 October Friendly	Egypt	1–0	Zambia	Al Ain, United Arab Emirates
20:00 GST (UTC+4)	H. Fathy 90+4'	Report		Stadium: Hazza bin Zayed Stadium; Referee: Ahmed Issa (Kuwait)

16 October Friendly	Egypt	1–1	Algeria	Al Ain, United Arab Emirates
20:00 GST (UTC+4)	H. Fathy 62'	Report	Slimani 90+3'	Stadium: Hazza bin Zayed Stadium; Referee: Yahya Al Mulla (United Arab Emirates)

16 November 2026 FIFA World Cup qualification	Egypt	6–0	Djibouti	Cairo, Egypt
18:00 CAT (UTC+2)	Salah 17', 22' (pen.), 48', 69'; M. Mohamed 73'; Trézéguet 89'	Report		Stadium: Cairo International Stadium; Attendance: 6,000; Referee: Jelly Chavani (South Africa)

19 November 2026 FIFA World Cup qualification	Sierra Leone	0–2	Egypt	Paynesville, Liberia
16:00 GMT (UTC±0)		Report	Trézéguet 18', 62'	Stadium: Samuel Kanyon Doe Sports Complex; Attendance: 8,916; Referee: Jean-Jacques Ndala (DR Congo)
Note: The match took place at Samuel Kanyon Doe Sports Complex in Paynesville, Liberia, instead of Siaka Stevens National Stadium in Freetown, Sierra Leone.

=== 2024 ===
7 January Friendly	Egypt	2–0	Tanzania	Cairo, Egypt
18:00 CAT (UTC+2)	Trézéguet 32'; Manula 73' (o.g.)	Report		Stadium: Cairo International Stadium; Referee: Hashem Al Ibrahim (Kuwait)

14 January 2023 Africa Cup of Nations Group B	Egypt	2–2	Mozambique	Abidjan, Ivory Coast
17:00 GMT (UTC±0)	M. Mohamed 2'; Salah 90+7' (pen.)	Report	Witi 56'; Clésio 58'	Stadium: Felix Houphouet Boigny Stadium; Attendance: 11,933; Referee: Dahane Beida (Mauritania)

18 January 2023 Africa Cup of Nations Group B	Egypt	2–2	Ghana	Abidjan, Ivory Coast
20:00 GMT (UTC±0)	Marmoush 69'; M. Mohamed 74'	Report	Kudus 45+3', 71'	Stadium: Felix Houphouet Boigny Stadium; Attendance: 20,808; Referee: Pierre Atcho (Gabon)

22 January 2023 Africa Cup of Nations Group B	Cape Verde	2–2	Egypt	Abidjan, Ivory Coast
20:00 GMT (UTC±0)	G. Tavares 45+1'; Teixeira 90+9'	Report	Trézéguet 50'; M. Mohamed 90+3'	Stadium: Felix Houphouet Boigny Stadium; Attendance: 15,650; Referee: Alhadi Allaou Mahamat (Chad)

28 January 2023 Africa Cup of Nations Round of 16	Egypt	1–1 (a.e.t.) (7–8 p)	DR Congo	San Pédro, Ivory Coast
20:00 GMT (UTC±0)	M. Mohamed 45+1' (pen.)	Report	Elia 37'	Stadium: Laurent Pokou Stadium; Attendance: 12,342; Referee: Abongile Tom (South Africa)
	Penalties
	Abdelmonem (penalty scored); M. Mohamed (penalty missed); Marmoush (penalty scored); Kamal (penalty scored); Hany (penalty scored); Hegazi (penalty scored); M. Fathi (penalty scored); Hamada (penalty scored); Abou Gabal (penalty missed)		(penalty scored) Moutoussamy; (penalty missed) Masuaku; (penalty scored) Dianagana; (penalty scored) Silas; (penalty scored) Tshibola; (penalty scored) Kalulu; (penalty scored) Mbemba; (penalty scored) Inonga Baka; (penalty scored) Mpasi

22 March 2024 ACUD Cup Semi-finals	Egypt	1–0	New Zealand	New Administrative Capital, Egypt
22:00 CAT (UTC+2)	M. Mohamed 29' (pen.)	Report		Stadium: New Administrative Capital Stadium; Attendance: 30,200; Referee: Clement Franklin Kpan (Ivory Coast)

26 March 2024 ACUD Cup Final	Egypt	2–4	Croatia	New Administrative Capital, Egypt
22:00 CAT (UTC+2)	Rabia 6'; Abdelmonem 90+4'	Report	Vlašić 21'; Petković 57'; Kramarić 77'; Majer 86'	Stadium: New Administrative Capital Stadium; Attendance: 85,350; Referee: Adalbert Diouf (Senegal)

6 June 2026 FIFA World Cup qualification	Egypt	2–1	Burkina Faso	Cairo, Egypt
22:00 CAST (UTC+3)	Trézéguet 3', 8'	Report	L. Traoré 57'	Stadium: Cairo International Stadium; Attendance: 65,000; Referee: Peter Waweru (Kenya)

10 June 2026 FIFA World Cup qualification	Guinea-Bissau	1–1	Egypt	Bissau, Guinea-Bissau
16:00 GMT (UTC±0)	Mam. Baldé 42'	Report	Salah 70'	Stadium: Estádio 24 de Setembro; Referee: Mahmood Ismail (Sudan)

6 September 2025 Africa Cup of Nations qualification	Egypt	3–0	Cape Verde	Cairo, Egypt
22:00 CAST (UTC+3)	Rabia 23'; Marmoush 45+1'; Adel 70'	Report		Stadium: Cairo International Stadium; Attendance: 10,000; Referee: Abongile Tom (South Africa)

10 September 2025 Africa Cup of Nations qualification	Botswana	0–4	Egypt	Francistown, Botswana
18:00 CAT (UTC+2)		Report	Trézéguet 5', 29'; Salah 56'; M. Fathi 90+4'	Stadium: Obed Itani Chilume Stadium; Referee: Omar Abdulkadir Artan (Somalia)

11 October 2025 Africa Cup of Nations qualification	Egypt	2–0	Mauritania	Cairo, Egypt
19:00 CAST (UTC+3)	Trézéguet 69'; Salah 79'	Report		Stadium: Cairo International Stadium; Referee: Alhadi Allaou Mahamat (Chad)

15 October 2025 Africa Cup of Nations qualification	Mauritania	0–1	Egypt	Nouakchott, Mauritania
16:00 GMT (UTC±0)		Report	Adel 85'	Stadium: Stade Cheikha Ould Boïdiya; Referee: Imtehaz Heeralall (Mauritius)

15 November 2025 Africa Cup of Nations qualification	Cape Verde	1–1	Egypt	Praia, Cape Verde
15:00 CVT (UTC−1)	Mendes 63' (pen.)	Report	T. Mohamed 31'	Stadium: Estádio Nacional de Cabo Verde; Referee: Djindo Louis Houngnandande (Benin)

19 November 2025 Africa Cup of Nations qualification	Egypt	1–1	Botswana	Cairo, Egypt
17:00 CAT (UTC+2)	Trézéguet 15'	Report	Kebatho 8'	Stadium: 30 June Stadium; Referee: Abdallah Jammeh (Gambia)

=== 2025 ===
21 March 2026 FIFA World Cup qualification	Ethiopia	0–2	Egypt	Casablanca, Morocco
23:00 UTC+1		Report	Salah 31'; Zizo 40'	Stadium: Larbi Zaouli Stadium; Attendance: 300; Referee: Patrice Milazar (Mauritius)

25 March 2026 FIFA World Cup qualification	Egypt	1–0	Sierra Leone	Cairo, Egypt
21:00 UTC+2	Zizo 45+2'	Report		Stadium: Cairo International Stadium; Referee: Ahmad Heeralall (Mauritius)

5 September 2026 FIFA World Cup qualification	Egypt	2–0	Ethiopia	Cairo, Egypt
21:00 UTC+2	Salah 41' (pen.); Marmoush 45+2' (pen.)	Report		Stadium: Cairo International Stadium; Attendance: 37,000; Referee: Abongile Tom (South Africa)

9 September 2026 FIFA World Cup qualification	Burkina Faso	0–0	Egypt	Ouagadougou, Burkina Faso
16:00 UTC+0		Report		Stadium: Stade du 4 Août; Referee: Messie Nkounkou (Republic of Congo)

8 October 2026 FIFA World Cup qualification	Djibouti	0–3	Egypt	Casablanca, Morocco
17:00 UTC+1		Report	Adel 8'; Salah 14', 84'	Stadium: Larbi Zaouli Stadium; Attendance: 1,200; Referee: Tanguy Mebiame (Gabon)

12 October 2026 FIFA World Cup qualification	Egypt	1–0	Guinea-Bissau	Cairo, Egypt
21:00 UTC+2	Hamdy 10'	Report		Stadium: Cairo International Stadium; Attendance: 41,000; Referee: Daniel Nii Laryea (Ghana)

14 November 2025 Al Ain International Cup Semi-finals	Uzbekistan	2–0	Egypt	Al Ain, United Arab Emirates
20:00 UTC+4	Urunov 4', 43'	Report		Stadium: Hazza bin Zayed Stadium; Attendance: 6,200; Referee: Ahmed Eisa Mohamed Darwish (United Arab Emirates)

17 November 2025 Al Ain International Cup Third place play-off	Cape Verde	1–1 (0–2 p)	Egypt	Al Ain, United Arab Emirates
17:00	Rodrigues 7' (pen.)	Report	Marmoush 57'	Stadium: Hazza bin Zayed Stadium; Attendance: 2,300; Referee: Rawdha Al Mansoori (United Arab Emirates)
	Penalties
	Diney (penalty missed); Monteiro (penalty missed); Pina (penalty missed); Mendes (penalty missed)		(penalty missed) Marmoush; (penalty scored) Abdelmaguid; (penalty scored) Hamdy; (penalty missed) Faisal

2 December 2025 FIFA Arab Cup Group C	Egypt	1–1	Kuwait	Lusail, Qatar
17:30 UTC+3	Afsha 88' (pen.)	Report	Al Hajeri 64'	Stadium: Lusail Stadium; Attendance: 24,632; Referee: Espen Eskås (Norway)

6 December 2025 FIFA Arab Cup Group C	United Arab Emirates	1–1	Egypt	Lusail, Qatar
21:30 UTC+3	Caio 60'	Report	Hamdy 85'	Stadium: Lusail Stadium; Attendance: 36,299; Referee: Glenn Nyberg (Sweden)

9 December 2025 FIFA Arab Cup Group C	Egypt	0–3	Jordan	Al Khor, Qatar
17:30 UTC+3		Report	Abu Hashish 19'; Abu Zrayq 41'; Olwan 90+2' (pen.)	Stadium: Al Bayt Stadium; Attendance: 55,658; Referee: Ismail Elfath (United States)

16 December Friendly	Egypt	2–1	Nigeria	Cairo, Egypt
20:00 UTC+2	Saber 28'; M. Mohamed 53'	Report	Awaziem 45+3'	Stadium: Cairo International Stadium; Referee: Mahmoud Nagy (Egypt)

22 December 2025 Africa Cup of Nations Group B	Egypt	2–1	Zimbabwe	Agadir, Morocco
21:00 UTC+1	Marmoush 64'; Salah 90+1'	Report	Dube 20'	Stadium: Adrar Stadium; Attendance: 28,199; Referee: Issa Sy (Senegal)

26 December 2025 Africa Cup of Nations Group B	Egypt	1–0	South Africa	Agadir, Morocco
16:00 UTC+1	Salah 45' (pen.)	Report		Stadium: Adrar Stadium; Attendance: 40,219; Referee: Pacifique Ndabihawenimana (Burundi)

29 December 2025 Africa Cup of Nations Group B	Angola	0–0	Egypt	Agadir, Morocco
17:00 UTC+1		Report		Stadium: Adrar Stadium; Attendance: 16,090; Referee: Clement Franklin Kpan (Ivory Coast)

=== 2026 ===
5 January 2025 Africa Cup of Nations Round of 16	Egypt	3–1 (a.e.t.)	Benin	Agadir, Morocco
17:00 UTC+1	Attia 69'; Ibrahim 97'; Salah 120+4'	Report	Dossou 83'	Stadium: Adrar Stadium; Attendance: 20,191; Referee: Pierre Atcho (Gabon)

10 January 2025 Africa Cup of Nations Quarter-finals	Egypt	3–2	Ivory Coast	Agadir, Morocco
20:00 UTC+1	Marmoush 4'; Rabia 32'; Salah 52'	Report	Fatouh 40' (o.g.); Doué 73'	Stadium: Adrar Stadium; Attendance: 31,213; Referee: Mustapha Ghorbal (Algeria)

14 January 2025 Africa Cup of Nations Semi-finals	Senegal	1–0	Egypt	Tangier, Morocco
18:00 UTC+1	Mané 78'	Report		Stadium: Tangier Grand Stadium; Attendance: 52,079; Referee: Pierre Atcho (Gabon)

17 January 2025 Africa Cup of Nations Third place play-off	Egypt	0–0 (2–4 p)	Nigeria	Casablanca, Morocco
17:00 UTC+1		Report		Stadium: Mohammed V Stadium; Attendance: 38,113; Referee: Jalal Jayed (Morocco)
	Penalties
	Salah (penalty missed); Marmoush (penalty missed); Rabia (penalty scored); Saber (penalty scored)		(penalty missed) Dele-Bashiru; (penalty scored) Adams; (penalty scored) Simon; (penalty scored) Iwobi; (penalty scored) Lookman

27 March Friendly	Saudi Arabia	0–4	Egypt	Jeddah, Saudi Arabia
20:30 UTC+3		Report	Issa 4'; Trézéguet 16'; Zizo 44'; Marmoush 56'	Stadium: King Abdullah Sports City; Attendance: 25,000; Referee: Abdulla Ali Al Athba (Qatar)
Note: The match took place at the King Abdullah Sports City in Jeddah, Saudi Arabia, instead of the Ahmad bin Ali Stadium in Al Rayyan, Qatar due to the 2026 Iran war.

31 March Friendly	Spain	0–0	Egypt	Cornellà de Llobregat, Spain
21:00 CEST		Report		Stadium: RCDE Stadium; Attendance: 35,895; Referee: Georgi Kabakov (Bulgaria)
Note: The match took place at RCDE Stadium in Cornellà de Llobregat, Spain, instead of Lusail Stadium in Lusail, Qatar due to the 2026 Iran war.

28 May Friendly	Egypt	1–0	Russia	Cairo, Egypt
21:00 UTC+3	Ziko 65'	Report		Stadium: Cairo International Stadium; Attendance: 35,000; Referee: Lahlou Benbraham (Algeria)

6 June Friendly	Brazil	2–1	Egypt	Cleveland, United States
18:00 UTC−4	Bruno Guimarães 7'; Endrick 52'	Report	Ziko 11'	Stadium: Huntington Bank Field; Attendance: 64,311; Referee: Adonai Escobedo (Mexico)

15 June 2026 FIFA World Cup Group G	Belgium	1–1	Egypt	Seattle, United States
12:00 UTC−7	Hany 66' (o.g.)	Report	Ashour 19'	Stadium: Lumen Field; Attendance: 66,775; Referee: Ramon Abatti (Brazil)

21 June 2026 FIFA World Cup Group G	New Zealand	1–3	Egypt	Vancouver, Canada
18:00 UTC−7	Surman 15'	Report	Ziko 58'; Salah 67'; Trézéguet 82'	Stadium: BC Place; Attendance: 52,497; Referee: Omar Al Ali (United Arab Emirates)

26 June 2026 FIFA World Cup Group G	Egypt	1–1	Iran	Seattle, United States
20:00 UTC−7	Saber 5'	Report	Rezaeian 14'	Stadium: Lumen Field; Attendance: 66,925; Referee: Szymon Marciniak (Poland)

3 July 2026 FIFA World Cup Round of 32	Australia	1–1 (a.e.t.) (2–4 p)	Egypt	Arlington, United States
13:00 UTC−5	Hany 55' (o.g.)	Report	Ashour 13'	Stadium: AT&T Stadium; Attendance: 70,224; Referee: Gustavo Tejera (Uruguay)
	Penalties
	Souttar (penalty missed); Irvine (penalty scored); Mabil (penalty scored); Herrington (penalty missed)		(penalty scored) Saber; (penalty scored) Rabia; (penalty scored) Salah; (penalty scored) Abdelmaguid

7 July 2026 FIFA World Cup Round of 16	Argentina	3–2	Egypt	Atlanta, United States
12:00 UTC−4	Romero 79'; Messi 83'; Fernández 90+2'	Report	Ibrahim 15'; Ziko 67'	Stadium: Mercedes-Benz Stadium; Attendance: 68,239; Referee: François Letexier (France)

== Head-to-head records ==
As of 27 March 2026

Head-to-head records
Opponent	Pld	W	D	L	GF	GA	W%	D%	L%
Algeria	2	0	2	0	2	2	0	100	0
Angola	3	1	2	0	3	2	33.33	66.67	0
Belgium	2	1	1	0	3	2	50	50	0
Benin	1	1	0	0	3	1	100	0	0
Botswana	2	1	1	0	5	1	50	50	0
Brazil	1	0	0	1	1	2	0	0	100
Burkina Faso	2	1	1	0	2	1	50	50	0
Cameroon	1	0	1	0	0	0	0	100	0
Cape Verde	4	1	3	0	7	4	25	75	0
Comoros	1	1	0	0	4	0	100	0	0
Croatia	1	0	0	1	2	4	0	0	100
DR Congo	1	0	1	0	1	1	0	100	0
Djibouti	2	2	0	0	9	0	100	0	0
Ethiopia	4	3	0	1	5	2	75	0	25
Gabon	2	1	1	0	3	2	50	50	0
Ghana	1	0	1	0	2	2	0	100	0
Guinea	2	2	0	0	3	1	100	0	0
Guinea-Bissau	3	2	1	0	3	1	66.67	33.33	0
Ivory Coast	2	1	1	0	3	2	50	50	0
Jordan	2	1	0	1	3	4	50	0	50
Kenya	1	0	1	0	1	1	0	100	0
Kuwait	1	0	1	0	1	1	0	100	0
Lebanon	1	1	0	0	1	0	100	0	0
Liberia	2	2	0	0	5	0	100	0	0
Libya	2	2	0	0	4	0	100	0	0
Malawi	2	2	0	0	6	0	100	0	0
Mauritania	2	2	0	0	3	0	100	0	0
Morocco	1	1	0	0	2	1	100	0	0
Mozambique	1	0	1	0	2	2	0	100	0
New Zealand	2	2	0	0	4	1	100	0	0
Niger	1	1	0	0	3	0	100	0	0
Nigeria	3	1	1	1	2	2	33.33	33.33	33.33
Qatar	1	0	1	0	0	0	0	100	0
Russia	1	1	0	0	1	0	100	0	0
Saudi Arabia	1	1	0	0	4	0	100	0	0
Senegal	4	1	1	2	1	2	25	25	50
Sierra Leone	2	2	0	0	3	0	100	0	0
South Africa	1	1	0	0	1	0	100	0	0
South Korea	1	0	0	1	1	4	0	0	100
Spain	1	0	1	0	0	0	0	100	0
South Sudan	1	1	0	0	3	0	100	0	0
Sudan	2	2	0	0	6	0	100	0	0
Tanzania	1	1	0	0	2	0	100	0	0
Togo	2	2	0	0	4	1	100	0	0
Tunisia	4	2	0	2	5	4	50	0	50
United Arab Emirates	1	0	1	0	1	1	0	100	0
Uzbekistan	1	0	0	1	0	2	0	0	100
Zambia	1	1	0	0	1	0	100	0	0
Zimbabwe	1	1	0	0	2	1	100	0	0
Totals	84	49	24	11	134	57	58.33	28.57	13.1
