= Rachid Benmahmoud =

Moroccan footballer and coach (born 1971)

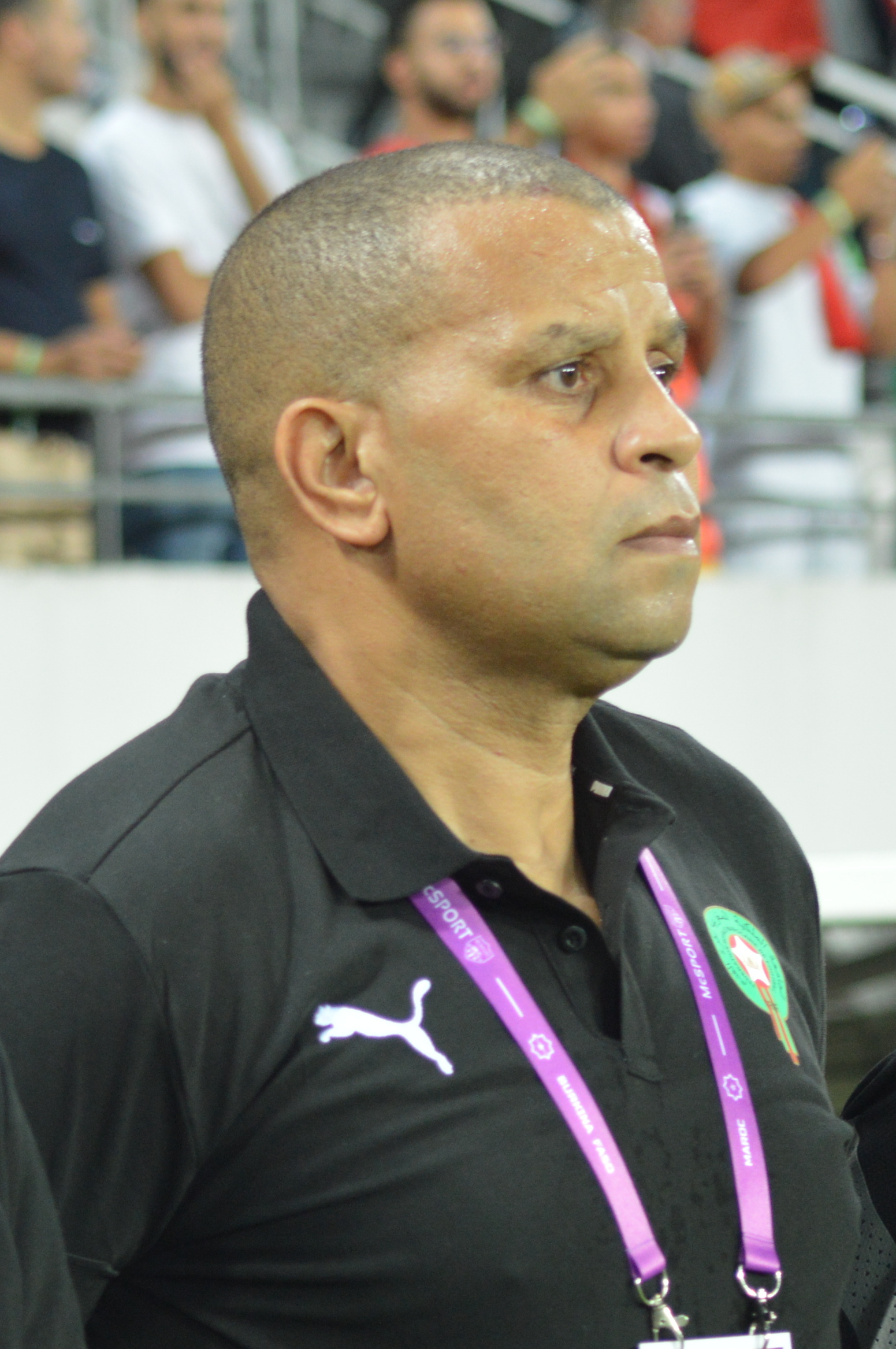
- Benmahmoud with Morocco in 2023

Personal information
- Full name: Mohamed Rachid Benmahmoud
- Date of birth: 14 September 1971 (age 55)
- Place of birth: Rabat, Morocco
- Position: Midfielder

Team information
- Current team: Morocco (assistant)

Senior career*
Years	Team	Apps	(Gls)
1986–1989	Youssoufia Rabat		
1989–1993	Crédit Agricole		
1993–1994	FUS Rabat		
1994–1996	Crédit Agricole		
1996–1997	Al-Rayyan		
1997–1998	Al Khaleej		
1998–2003	Al-Ahli Dubai		
2003–2004	Al-Arabi		
2004	Al Khaleej		
2005	Dibba Al-Hisn SC		

International career
1993–2002	Morocco	26	(3)

Managerial career
- 2007–2009: Al-Ahli Dubai
- 2012: Qatar SC (assistant)
- 2012–2013: Morocco (assistant)
- 2017–2018: Wydad (assistant)
- 2022–: Morocco (assistant)
- * Club domestic league appearances and goals

Mohamed Rachid Benmahmoud (Arabic: محمد رشيد بن محمود; born 14 September 1971) is a Moroccan professional football manager and former player who works as an assistant manager for the Morocco national team.

== Club career ==
A midfielder, Benmahmoud began his playing career with the Moroccan club Youssoufia Rabat in 1986. In 1989, he moved to Crédit Agricole where he played four seasons, before getting a big move on loan to FUS Rabat in 1993 in the Botola. In 1996, he moved to Qatar with Al-Rayyan where he came second in the league and cup competition. The following season he moved to UAE with Al Khaleej in the second division, and helped them win the division and earn promotion, earning him suitors from abroad. He then moved to Al-Ahli Dubai on a five-year contract. In 2003, he returned to Qatar with Al-Arabi for a season, before finishing his career in UAE with successive stints at Al Khaleej again and Dibba Al-Hisn SC.

== International career ==
Benmahmoud represented the Morocco from 1993 to 2002, having played for them at the 2000 and 2002 Africa Cup of Nations.

== Managerial career ==
On 22 February 2007, Benmahmoud became the manager of his former side Al-Ahli Dubai in the UAE. He helped them win the UAE President's Cup in 2008, and the 2008–09 UAE Pro League. In 2009, his contract expired and he returned to Morocco. In 2012, he was named assistant coach at Qatar SC. In 2012, he was named assistant coach with the Morocco national team under Rachid Taoussi alongside Walid Regragui, but left in 2013 after an early elimination at the 2013 Africa Cup of Nations. In 2017, he worked with Houcine Ammouta as assistant in Wydad, and helped them win the 2016–17 Botola and the 2017 CAF Champions League before leaving in 2018. In 2022, he returned to the Morocco national as assistant manager under his old partner Regragui.

== Personal life ==
In September 2023, he organized the Morocco national team to donate blood to those injured during the 2023 Marrakesh–Safi earthquake.
