= Hady Khashaba =

Egyptian footballer (born 1972)

Personal information
- Full name: Hady Sherif Khashaba
- Date of birth: 19 December 1972 (age 53)
- Place of birth: Asyut, Egypt
- Height: 1.80 m (5 ft 11 in)
- Position: Midfielder

Senior career*
Years	Team	Apps	(Gls)
1991–2006	Al Ahly	301	(26)

International career
1991	Egypt U20	3	(0)
1992	Egypt Olympic	3	(2)
1992–2004	Egypt	93	(12)
- * Club domestic league appearances and goals

Hady Sherif Khashaba (Arabic: هَادِي شَرِيف خَشَبَة; born 19 December 1972) is an Egyptian former footballer who played at both professional and international levels as a midfielder.

== Career ==
=== Club career ===
Khashaba spent his entire professional career with one club, Al Ahly, from 1991 to 2006.

=== International career ===
Khashaba made three appearances at the 1991 FIFA World Youth Championship.

Khashaba earned 84 caps for the Egyptian senior side between 1992 and 2004, scoring twelve goals. Khashaba represented them at the 1992 Summer Olympics in Barcelona., the 1999 FIFA Confederations Cup, and at the Africa Cup of Nations in 1998, 2000 and 2004.

=== International goals ===
Scores and results list Egypt's goal tally first.

#	Date	Venue	Opponent	Score	Result	Competition
1.	5 November 1993	El Menzah Stadium, Tunis, Tunisia	Malta	3–0	3–0	1993 7th November Cup
2.	4 June 1995	Cairo International Stadium, Cairo, Egypt	Ethiopia	2–0	2–0	1996 African Cup of Nations qualification
3.	26 April 1997	Independence Stadium, Windhoek, Namibia	Namibia	2–2	3–2	1998 FIFA World Cup qualification
4.	12 June 1997	Seoul Olympic Stadium, Seoul, South Korea	South Korea	1–1	1–3	1997 Korea Cup
5.	13 July 1997	Cairo International Stadium, Cairo, Egypt	Senegal	2–0	2–0	1998 African Cup of Nations qualification
6.	27 July 1997	Alexandria Stadium, Alexandria, Egypt	Ethiopia	1–0	8–1	1998 African Cup of Nations qualification
7.	17 August 1997	Cairo International Stadium, Cairo, Egypt	Liberia	1–0	5–0	1998 FIFA World Cup qualification
8.	3 December 1997	Cairo International Stadium, Cairo, Egypt	Ghana	3–2	3–2	Friendly
9.	18 December 1997	Aswan Stadium, Aswan, Egypt	Togo	4–0	7–2	Friendly
10.	20 December 1997	Aswan Stadium, Aswan, Egypt	Algeria	1–2	1–2	Friendly
11.	22 December 1997	Cairo International Stadium, Cairo, Egypt	Cameroon	1–0	2–0	Friendly
12.	14 November 1999	Independence Stadium, Windhoek, Namibia	Namibia	1–0	1–0	Friendly
