= Abdullah El-Sawy =

Egyptian footballer (born 1971)

Personal information
- Full name: Abdullah El-Sawy
- Date of birth: 26 October 1971 (age 55)
- Place of birth: Tanta, Egypt
- Height: 1.80 m (5 ft 11 in)
- Position: Forward

Youth career
- Tanta FC

Senior career*
Years	Team	Apps	(Gls)
1989 – 1993	Tanta FC		
1993–1995	El Qanah		
1996–1997	Al-Mokawloon Al-Arab		
1996–1997	Baladeyet El-Mahalla		
1998–2000	Tanta FC		

International career
1994–1996	Egypt	6	(1)
- * Club domestic league appearances and goals

Abdullah El-Sawy (Arabic عبدالله الصاوي; born 26 October 1971) is an Egyptian former football striker. He was the top scorer of Egyptian Premier League (1994–95) with 10 goals playing for El Qanah.

== International career ==
After being the top goal scorer, El-Sawy made some appearances for the Egypt national football team, including 1996 African Cup of Nations qualification qualifying matches.

=== International Goals ===
Scores and results list Egypt's goal tally first.

#	Date	Venue	Opponent	Score	Result	Competition
1.	7 April 1995	Alexandria Stadium, Alexandria, Egypt	Sudan	2–0	3–1	1996 African Cup of Nations qualification

== Titles and honours ==
- Top scorer in Egyptian Premier League (1994–95) with 10 goals.
