= 2020 UAE Super Cup =

13th professional UAE Super Cup

- Event: Super Cup
Sharjah	Shabab Al Ahli
AGL	Cup
0	1
- Date: 22 January 2021
- Venue: Al Maktoum Stadium, Dubai
- Referee: Hamad Ali Yousef
- Attendance: 0 (behind closed doors due to COVID-19 pandemic)

The 2020 UAE Super Cup was the 13th professional and 20th overall UAE Super Cup, an annual football match played between the winners of the previous season's Pro-League and President's Cup.

Due to the cancellation of last year's tournament as a result of the COVID-19 pandemic, the super cup was contested as a repeat between the participants of last season's league and cup winners, Sharjah and Shabab Al Ahli.

== Details ==
22 January 2021
20:00

Sharjah	0–1	Shabab Al Ahli
	Report	Marzooq 90+5'

Al Maktoum Stadium, Dubai
Attendance: 0
Referee: Hamad Ali Yousef

Sharjah	Shabab Al Ahli

GK	40	(United Arab Emirates) Adel Al-Hosani (c)
RB	22	(Brazil) Marcos Meloni
CB	4	(United Arab Emirates) Shahin Abdulrahman	(yellow card) 76'
DF	13	(United Arab Emirates) Salem Sultan	(yellow card) 43'
LB	17	(United Arab Emirates) Ali Al-Dhanhani		(substituted off) 89'
MF	8	(United Arab Emirates) Mohammed Abdulbasit
MF	11	(United Arab Emirates) Saif Rashid		(substituted off) 75'
DM	29	(Uzbekistan) Otabek Shukurov
LM	20	(United Arab Emirates) Khaled Ba Wazir		(substituted off) 75'
AM	10	(Brazil) Igor Coronado
ST	9	(Brazil) Welliton		(substituted off) 89'
Substitutes:
DF	5	(United Arab Emirates) Hamad Jassim
DF	6	(United Arab Emirates) Majed Suroor		(substituted on) 75'
MF	7	(Brazil) Caio		(substituted on) 75'
DF	15	(United Arab Emirates) Abdulaziz Al-Kaabi
ST	16	(Brazil) Caio Rosa
DF	18	(United Arab Emirates) Abdullah Ghanem
GK	26	(United Arab Emirates) Darwish Bin Habib
MF	30	(United Arab Emirates) Salem Saleh		(substituted on) 89'
MF	38	(United Arab Emirates) Mohammed Khalfan		(substituted on) 89'
Manager:
(United Arab Emirates) Abdulaziz Al Yassi

GK	55	(United Arab Emirates) Majed Naser (c)
RB	9	(United Arab Emirates) Abdulaziz Haikal
CB	5	(United Arab Emirates) Walid Abbas
LB	62	(United Arab Emirates) Abdelaziz Sanqour		(substituted off) 44'
DM	88	(United Arab Emirates) Majed Hassan	(yellow card) 12'
DM	36	(United Arab Emirates) Hamdan Al-Kamali
AM	6	(Uzbekistan) Azizjon Ganiev
CM	3	(Brazil) Carlos Eduardo
LM	10	(Argentina) Federico Cartabia
ST	22	(United Arab Emirates) Yahya Al Ghassani		(substituted off) 77'
ST	99	(Brazil) Igor Jesus
Substitutes:
DM	4	(United Arab Emirates) Mohammed Marzooq		(substituted on) 44'
DF	8	(United Arab Emirates) Waleed Hussain
MF	15	(United Arab Emirates) Abdullah Al-Naqbi
ST	16	(United Arab Emirates) Saeed Al-Bloushi
GK	17	(United Arab Emirates) Hassan Hamza
DF	21	(United Arab Emirates) Mohammed Jaber
MF	30	(United Arab Emirates) Mohammed Jumaa		(substituted on) 77'
DF	37	(United Arab Emirates) Ahmad Jamil
ST	77	(United Arab Emirates) Ahmed Al Attas
Manager:
(United Arab Emirates) Mahdi Ali
