= United Arab Emirates football records =

The following is the list of United Arab Emirates football records.

== Most Successful Teams ==
- UAE Pro League = PL
- UAE President's Cup = PC
- UAE League Cup = LC
- UAE Federation Cup (defunct) = FC
- UAE Super Cup = SC
- AFC Champions League = ACL
- GCC Champions League = GCL

=== Successful Teams ===
Most successful clubs in the UAE by their combined trophy count

Last updated on 26 May 2024, following Al Wasl winning the Pro League

Rank	Club	PL	PC	LC	FC	SC	ACL	GCL	Other	Total
1	Al Ain	15	8	2	3	5	2	1	2^{a}	38
2	Shabab Al Ahli	9	11	5	—	7	—	—	2^{b}	36
3	Sharjah	6	10	1	—	3	—	—	1 ^{c}	24
4	Al Nasr	3	4	2	4	2	—	1	1 ^{d}	20
5	Al Wahda	4	2	4	3	4	—	—	—	19
6	Al Wasl	8	3	—	1	—	—	1	—	14
7	Al Shabab^{e}	3	4	1	1	—	—	3	—	12
8	Al Jazira	3	3	1	1	1	—	1	—	11
9	Ajman	—	1	1	2	—	—	—	—	4
10	Dubai^{e}	—	—	—	2	—	—	—	—	2
=	Baniyas	—	1	—	—	—	—	1	—	2
=	Emirates	—	1	—	—	1	—	—	—	2
=	Al Shaab^{f}	—	1	—	—	1	—	—	—	2
14	Al Dhafra	—	—	—	1	—	—	—	—	1

_{Notes
1. Al Ain include 2 Abu Dhabi Championship (not official by UAEFA), 1 Joint League Cup, 1 Emirati-Moroccan Super Cup.
2. Shabab Al Ahli include 1 Emirati-Moroccan Super Cup, 1 Qatar–UAE Super Shield.
3. Sharjah include 1 Joint League Cup.
4. Al Nasr include 1 ADNOC Championship (not official by UAEFA), 1 Joint League Cup.
5. Al Shabab and Dubai CSC merged into Al-Ahli form Shabab Al Ahli in 2017
6. Al Shaab dissolved in 2017, after club merged with Sharjah}

== Continental Titles ==
=== AFC Champions League ===
Club	Number of Championships	Years
Al Ain	2	2003, 2024

=== Gulf Club Champions Cup ===
Club	Number of Championships	Years
Al Shabab	3	1992, 2011, 2015
Al Nasr	1	2014
Baniyas	1	2013
Al Wasl	1	2010
Al Jazira	1	2007
Al Ain	1	2001

== Domestic Titles ==
=== Pro-League ===
Club	Number of Championships	Years
Al Ain	14	1977, 1981, 1984, 1993, 1998, 2000, 2002, 2003, 2004, 2012, 2013, 2015, 2018, 2022
Shabab Al Ahli	9	1975, 1976, 1980, 2006, 2009, 2014, 2016, 2023 2025
Al Wasl	8	1982, 1983, 1985, 1988, 1992, 1997, 2007, 2024
Sharjah	6	1974, 1987, 1989, 1994, 1996, 2019
Al Wahda	4	1999, 2001, 2005, 2010
Al Nasr	3	1978, 1979, 1986
Al Shabab	3	1990, 1995, 2008
Al Jazira	3	2011, 2017, 2021

=== President's Cup ===
Club	Champions	Years				
Shabab Al Ahli	11	1975, 1977, 1988, 1996, 2002, 2004, 2008, 2013, 2019, 2021’ [[2024_25 UAE President's Cup|2025]]’	—	Sharjah	10	1979, 1980, 1982, 1983, 1991, 1995, 1998, 2003, 2022, 2023
Al Ain	11	7	1999, 2001, 2005, 2006, 2009, 2014, 2018			
Al Nasr	4	1985, 1986, 1989, 2015				
Al Shabab	4	1981, 1990, 1994, 1997				
Al Jazira	3	2011, 2012, 2016				
Al Wasl	3	1987, 2007, 2024				
Al Wahda	2	2000, 2017				
Baniyas	1	1992				
Ajman	1	1984				
Emirates	1	2010				
Al Shaab	1	1993				

=== League Cup ===
Club	Champions	Years			
Shabab Al Ahli	5	2012, 2014, 2017, 2019, 2021			
Al Wahda	3	2016, 2018, 2024			
Al Ain	2	2009, 2022			
Al Nasr	2	2015, 2020			
Al Jazira	2010	2025	Ajman	1	2013
Sharjah	2023			1	
Al Shabab	2011			1	

=== Federation Cup ===
Club	Number of Championships	Years
Al Nasr	4	1988, 1994, 2000, 2002
Al Ain	3	1989, 2005, 2006
Al Wahda	3	1986, 1995, 2001
Ajman	2	2011, 2016
Dubai	2	2010, 2015
Al Dhafra	1	2012
Al Jazira	1	2007
Al Wasl	1	1993
Al Shabab	1	1985

=== Super Cup ===
Team	Champion	Years won
Shabab Al Ahli	7	2008, 2013, 2014, 2016, 2020, 2023’ 2024’
Al Ain	5	1995, 2003, 2009, 2012, 2015
Al Wahda	4	2002, 2011, 2017, 2018
Sharjah	4	1994, 2019, 2022’ 2025’
Al Nasr	2	1990, 1996
Emirates	1	2010
Al Jazira	1	2021
Al Shaab	1	1993

== Minor Titles ==
=== Joint League Cup ===
Club	Number of Championships	Years
Sharjah	1	1976–77
Al Ain	1	1982–83
Al Nasr	1	1984–85

=== Abu Dhabi Championship Cup ===
Club	Number of Championships	Years
Al Ain	2	1974, 1975

== Asian Champions League ==
=== Participations ===
Team	Qualified	2003	2004	2005	2006	2007	2008	2009	2010	2011	2012	2013	2014	2015	2016	2017	2018	2019	2020	2021	2022	2024
Al Ain	17 Times	C	QF	R	QF	G			G	G		G	SF	R16		R	QF	R16	G	QS		C
Al Wahda	12 Times		QF		G	SF	G		G	G				QS		G	G	R16	WD	QF
Al Jazira	11 Times							G	G	G	R16	G	R16	QS	G	G	R16				G
Al Ahli	6 Times			G				G	G				G		R		R16
Sharjah	6 Times		QF					DQ											G	R16	G	G
Shabab Al Ahli	4 Times																		R16	G	R16	QS
Al Nasr	4 Times										G	G			QF			QS
Al Wasl	3 Times						G										G	G
Al Shabab	3 Times										G	R16				QS
Baniyas	3 Times										R16		QS								QS
Emirates	1 Time									G

QS : Qualifying Stage, G : Group Round, R16 : Round of 16, QF : Quarterfinals, SF : Semifinal, R : Runner-up, C : Champions, DQ : Disqualified, WD : Withdrew

== Asian Club Championship ==
=== Participations ===
A total of six clubs represented UAE in the AFC Asian Club Championship which became defunct in 2002 (see : AFC Champions League).

Team	Qualified	1988	1989	1990	1992	1993	1994	1995	1996	1997	1998	1999	2000	2001	2002
Al Wasl	3 Times			G		3rd		G
Sharjah	3 Times		G				QS			WD
Al Shabab	2 Times				4th				QS
Al Ain	2 Times											3rd		QS
Al Wahda	2 Times												QS		G
Al Nasr	2 Times	G									WD

QS : Qualifying Stage, G : Group Round, 4th : Fourth Place, 3rd : Third Place, WD : Withdrew

== Arab Club Champions Cup ==
=== Participations ===
Team	Qualified	1988	1992	1998	1999	2000	2001	2007	2008	2009	2017	2019	2020
Sharjah	4 Times	GS			GS				R32	WD
Al Wasl	3 Times			SF								QF	R16
Al Ain	2 Times						WD					R32
Al Ahli	2 Times					GS		R32
Al Jazira	2 Times											R32	R16
Al Wahda	1 Time										GS
Al Shabab	1 Time		GS

GS : Group Stage, R32 : Round of 32, R16 : Round of 16, QF : Quarter final, SF : Semi final, R : Runner-up, C : Champions, WD : Withdrew

== FIFA Club World Cup ==
=== Participations ===
Team	Qualified	2009	2010	2017	2018	2021
Al Jazira	2 Times			4th		6th
Al Ahli	1 Time	7th
Al Wahda	1 Time		6th
Al Ain	1 Time				2nd

Q = Qualified, 7th = seventh place, 6th = sixth place, 5th = fifth place, 4th = fourth place, 3rd = third place, 2nd = runner up, 1st = champions
