= 2020–21 UAE Pro League =

UAE Pro League
- Season: 2020–21
- Dates: 16 October 2020 – 15 May 2021
- Champions: Al Jazira (3rd title)
- Relegated: Fujairah; Hatta
- AFC Champions League: Al Jazira; Baniyas; Shabab Al Ahli; Sharjah
- FIFA Club World Cup: Al Jazira
- Matches: 182
- Goals: 566 (3.11 per match)
- Top goalscorer: Ali Mabkhout (25 goals)
- Biggest home win: Al Wahda 6–0 Hatta (16 October 2020)
- Biggest away win: Kalba 0–6 Al Jazira (14 February 2021)
- Highest scoring: Shabab Al Ahli 3–5 Al Jazira (21 November 2020)
- Longest winning run: Sharjah; Al Jazira (6 games)
- Longest unbeaten run: Shabab Al Ahli (13 games)
- Longest winless run: Hatta (15 games)
- Longest losing run: Hatta (8 games)
- All statistics correct as of 15 May 2021.

The 2020–21 UAE Pro League was the 46th edition of the UAE Pro League following the cancellation of the previous season, no team changes occurred due to the previous season declared as void in UAE football. Despite starting the season with rough results, Al Jazira went on to win their third league title while Baniyas finished second, coincidentally, both teams finished in the same positions ten years ago in the 2010–11 season.

== Stadia and locations ==
Locations of teams in the 2020–21 UAE Pro League

Note: Table lists clubs in alphabetical order.

Team	Home city	Stadium	Capacity
Ajman	Ajman	Ajman Stadium	5,537
Al Ain	Al-Ain	Hazza Bin Zayed Stadium	25,965
Al Dhafra	Madinat Zayed	Al Dhafra Stadium	5,020
Al Jazira	Abu Dhabi (Al Nahyan)	Mohammad Bin Zayed Stadium	42,056
Al Nasr	Dubai (Al Nasr)	Al-Maktoum Stadium	15,058
Al Wahda	Abu Dhabi (Al Nahyan)	Al Nahyan Stadium	12,201
Al Wasl	Dubai (Zabeel)	Zabeel Stadium	8,439
Baniyas	Abu Dhabi (Al Shamkha)	Baniyas Stadium	10,000
Fujairah	Fujairah	Fujairah Club Stadium	10,645
Hatta	Hatta	Hamdan Bin Rashid Stadium	5,000
Kalba	Kalba	Ittihad Kalba Stadium	8,500
Khor Fakkan	Khor Fakkan	SBM Al Qassimi Stadium	7,500
Shabab Al Ahli	Dubai (Deira)	Al-Rashid Stadium	12,052
Sharjah	Sharjah	Sharjah Stadium	20,000

== Personnel and kits ==
Note: Flags indicate national team as has been defined under FIFA eligibility rules. Players may hold more than one non-FIFA nationality.

Team	Head coach	Captain	Kit Manufacturer	Shirt Sponsor
Ajman	(Egypt) Ayman Elramady	(United Arab Emirates) Rashed Malallah	Hummel	Ajman Bank
Al Ain	(Portugal) Pedro Emanuel	(United Arab Emirates) Ismail Ahmed	Nike	First Abu Dhabi Bank
Al Dhafra	(Syria) Mohammad Kwid	(United Arab Emirates) Ahmed Ali	Adidas	Ruwais
Al Jazira	(Netherlands) Marcel Keizer	(United Arab Emirates) Ali Khasif	Adidas	Healthpoint
Al Nasr	(Argentina) Ramón Díaz	(United Arab Emirates) Tareq Ahmed	N45	Emirates Islamic
Al Wahda	(Netherlands) Henk ten Cate	(United Arab Emirates) Ismail Matar	Adidas	No sponsor
Al Wasl	(Brazil) Odair Hellmann	(United Arab Emirates) Lima	New Balance	Emaar
Baniyas	(Romania) Daniel Isăilă	(United Arab Emirates) Fawaz Awana	Joma	No sponsor
Fujairah	(Tunisia) Nassif Al Bayawi	(United Arab Emirates) Hilal Saeed	Nike	Asas
Hatta	(Serbia) Vladimir Vermezović	(United Arab Emirates) Mahmoud Hassan	uhlsport	No sponsor
Kalba	(Uruguay) Jorge Da Silva	(United Arab Emirates) Mansor Abbas	Erreà	Caltex
Khor Fakkan	(Brazil) Caio Zanardi	(United Arab Emirates) Saif Mohammed	Adidas	No sponsor
Shabab Al Ahli	(United Arab Emirates) Mahdi Ali	(United Arab Emirates) Majed Naser	Nike	Nissan
Sharjah	(United Arab Emirates) Abdulaziz Al Yassi	(United Arab Emirates) Shahin Abdulrahman	Adidas	Saif Zone

=== Foreign players ===
All teams could register as many foreign players as they want, but could only use four on the field each game.

- Players name in **bold** indicates the player is registered during the mid-season transfer window.
- Players in italics were out of the squad or left the club within the season, after the pre-season transfer window, or in the mid-season transfer window, and at least had one appearance.

Club	Player 1	Player 2	Player 3	Player 4	Former Players
Ajman	(Brazil) **Luiz Antônio**	(The Gambia) Bubacarr Trawally	(Mali) **Modibo Maïga**	(Morocco) **Iliass Bel Hassani**	(Brazil) Diego Jardel (Brazil) Gustavo Vagenin (Ghana) William Owusu (Portugal) Diogo Amado
Al Ain	(Angola) Wilson Eduardo	(Japan) Tsukasa Shiotani	(Japan) **Shoya Nakajima**	(Togo) Kodjo Fo-Doh Laba	(Kazakhstan) Bauyrzhan Islamkhan
Al Dhafra	(Morocco) Issam El Adoua	(Netherlands) Mikhail Rosheuvel	(Senegal) **Makhete Diop**	(Spain) **Pedro Conde**	(Brazil) Denílson (Jordan) Yaseen al-Bakhit
Al Jazira	(Curaçao) **Brandley Kuwas**	(Nigeria) Imoh Ezekiel	(Serbia) Miloš Kosanović	(South Africa) Thulani Serero	
Al Nasr	(Algeria) **Mehdi Abeid**	(Cape Verde) Ryan Mendes	(Israel) Dia Saba	(Portugal) Tozé	(Curaçao) Brandley Kuwas (Uzbekistan) Dostonbek Khamdamov
Al Wahda	(Democratic Republic of the Congo) Paul-José M'Poku	(South Korea) Lee Myung-joo	(Slovenia) Tim Matavž	(Ba'athist Syria) **Omar Kharbin**	(Moldova) Henrique Luvannor
Al Wasl	(Argentina) Nicolás Oroz	(Brazil) João Figueiredo	(Brazil) Neris	(Brazil) Ronaldo Mendes	
Baniyas	(Argentina) Gastón Suárez	(Argentina) Nicolás Giménez	(Brazil) João Pedro	(Serbia) Saša Ivković	
Fujairah	(Algeria) **Rachid Aït-Atmane**	(Brazil) **Douglas Coutinho**	(Sweden) Samuel Armenteros	(Tunisia) Firas Ben Larbi	(Brazil) Farley Rosa (Curaçao) Roly Bonevacia
Hatta	(Brazil) **Jonathas**	(Uzbekistan) **Dostonbek Khamdamov**	(Slovenia) **Miral Samardžić**	(Sweden) **Nahir Besara**	(Brazil) Willian Farias (Colombia) Kevin Londoño (Hungary) Vladimir Koman (Zambia) Mwape Musonda
Khor Fakkan	(Brazil) Bruno Lamas	(Brazil) Dodô	(Brazil) **Paulinho**	(Brazil) Ramon Lopes	(Colombia) Orlando Berrío (Brazil) Ricardinho
Kalba	(Brazil) **Rômulo**	(Brazil) Wanderson	(Switzerland) Davide Mariani	(Togo) Peniel Mlapa	(Argentina) Matías Pisano (Chile) Júnior Fernándes
Shabab Al Ahli	(Argentina) Federico Cartabia	(Brazil) Carlos Eduardo	(Uzbekistan) **Jaloliddin Masharipov**	(Uzbekistan) **Odiljon Hamrobekov**	(Cape Verde) Héldon Ramos (Uzbekistan) Azizjon Ganiev
Sharjah	(Brazil) Caio	(Italy) Igor Coronado	(Brazil) Welliton	(Uzbekistan) Otabek Shukurov	

=== Managerial changes ===
Team	Outgoing manager	Date of vacancy	Manner of departure	Pos.	Incoming manager	Date of appointment
Baniyas	(Germany) Winfried Schäfer	1 June 2020	End of contract	Pre-season	(Romania) Daniel Isăilă	27 June 2020
Fujairah	(Italy) Fabio Viviani	1 June 2020	End of contract	Pre-season	(Serbia) Goran Tufegdžić	12 July 2020
Khor Fakkan	(Serbia) Goran Tufegdžić	12 July 2020	Signed by Fujairah	Pre-season	(Brazil) Caio Zanardi	2 October 2020
Al Wahda	(Spain) Manuel Jiménez	18 July 2020	End of contract	Pre-season	(Netherlands) Mark Wotte	20 July 2020
Al Wahda	(Netherlands) Mark Wotte	7 September 2020	Sacked	Pre-season	(Serbia) Vuk Rašović	7 September 2020
Al Dhafra	(Serbia) Vuk Rašović	7 September 2020	Signed by Al Wahda	Pre-season	(Serbia) Aleksandar Veselinović	25 September 2020
Al Wasl	(Romania) Laurențiu Reghecampf	18 October 2020	Sacked	12th	(United Arab Emirates) Salem Rabie	20 October 2020
Hatta	(Greece) Christos Kontis	22 November 2020	Sacked	14th	(Serbia) Vladimir Vermezović	22 November 2020
Al Wasl	(United Arab Emirates) Salem Rabie	7 December 2020	Mutual consent	9th	(Brazil) Odair Hellmann	8 December 2020
Shabab Al Ahli	(Spain) Gerard Zaragoza	15 December 2020	Sacked	7th	(United Arab Emirates) Mahdi Ali	15 December 2020
Al Dhafra	(Serbia) Aleksandar Veselinović	5 January 2021	Sacked	10th	(Syria) Mohammad Kwid	5 January 2021
Al Nasr	(Croatia) Krunoslav Jurčić	4 February 2021	Sacked	4th	(Argentina) Ramón Díaz	4 February 2021
Fujairah	(Serbia) Goran Tufegdžić	16 February 2021	Resigned	12th	(Tunisia) Nassif Al Bayawi	17 February 2021
Al Wahda	(Serbia) Vuk Rašović	12 March 2021	Sacked	8th	(Netherlands) Henk ten Cate	13 March 2021

== League table ==
Pos	Team	Pld	W	D	L	GF	GA	GD	Pts	Qualification or relegation
1	Al Jazira (C)	26	17	6	3	65	29	+36	57	Qualification for AFC Champions League group stage and FIFA Club World Cup first round
2	Baniyas	26	16	6	4	50	22	+28	54	Qualification for AFC Champions League play-off round
3	Shabab Al Ahli	26	13	11	2	52	30	+22	50	Qualification for AFC Champions League group stage (Note: Since Shabab Al Ahli won the UAE President's Cup, they qualified directly to the AFC Champions League group stage meanwhile the league runner-ups Baniyas qualified for the play-off round instead.)
4	Sharjah	26	14	6	6	48	29	+19	48	Qualification for AFC Champions League play-off round
5	Al Nasr	26	14	4	8	47	33	+14	46	
6	Al Ain	26	11	8	7	39	33	+6	41	
7	Al Wahda	26	10	10	6	48	33	+15	40	
8	Kalba	26	11	6	9	29	39	−10	39	
9	Al Wasl	26	10	7	9	49	47	+2	37	
10	Khor Fakkan	26	7	4	15	35	50	−15	25	
11	Al Dhafra	26	5	6	15	31	58	−27	21	
12	Ajman	26	4	6	16	24	57	−33	18	
13	Fujairah (R)	26	4	3	19	31	57	−26	15	Relegation to UAE Division 1
14	Hatta (R)	26	3	3	20	19	50	−31	12	Relegation to UAE Division 1

Source: Arabian Gulf League
Rules for classification: 1) points; 2) head-to-head goal difference; 3) head-to-head goals scored; 4) head-to-head away goals scored; 5) goal difference; 6) number of goals scored; 7) number of away goals scored; 8) head-to-head points; 9) fair play ranking 10) draw
(C) Champions; (R) Relegated

== Results ==
Home \ Away	AJM	AIN	DHA	JAZ	NAS	WAH	WAS	YAS	FUJ	HAT	KAL	KHF	SAD	SHR
Ajman		0–2	2–1	3–3	0–3	3–3	2–3	0–0	2–1	0–0	0–1	1–2	1–1	0–3
Al Ain	0–0		4–1	2–2	1–3	1–0	1–1	1–2	3–1	1–0	1–1	2–0	1–4	1–2
Al Dhafra	4–1	2–1		1–5	0–2	0–3	1–1	0–5	3–1	1–0	1–2	2–0	1–2	1–1
Al Jazira	3–0	2–0	1–1		3–0	2–0	3–2	3–3	4–2	3–0 (Note: The Emirates FA announced on 1 December 2020 that Hatta were found guilty for failing to fulfill match protocols by only conducting corona tests on 19 instead of 20 players in their match against Al Jazira in Round 7. They decided to award the match to Al Jazira as a 3–0 forfeit win; the match originally finished 2–0 to Al Jazira.)	2–0	3–1	1–1	0–1
Al Nasr	3–0	1–2	3–2	1–1		2–2	0–1	1–0	3–2	2–0	2–1	2–1	2–3	2–1
Al Wahda	3–0	0–4	1–1	2–0	2–2		3–2	0–2	2–1	6–0	0–1	3–0	1–1	1–1
Al Wasl	4–2	1–2	2–1	2–3	0–3	2–2		1–4	3–0	2–1	4–4	1–2	2–2	3–3
Baniyas	2–0	4–1	3–1	1–3	3–2	1–1	0–2		2–1	1–0	0–2	5–0	0–0	1–0
Fujairah	1–2	1–1	4–2	0–3	2–0	1–4	1–1	1–3		1–0	0–3	1–2	3–2	2–4
Hatta	3–0	0–1	2–2	0–1	0–3	1–4	2–4	0–3	1–0		4–0	2–3	1–2	2–3
Kalba	2–1	1–1	2–1	0–6	3–3	0–0	0–3	0–2	1–0	0–0		2–1	0–3	1–0
Khor Fakkan	2–3	2–2	5–1	3–0	0–1	1–2	0–1	1–2	0–0	1–0	1–2		2–2	1–1
Shabab Al Ahli	5–1	1–1	0–0	3–5	1–0	2–2	3–0	0–0	3–2	3–0	2–0	4–3		1–0
Sharjah	2–0	1–2	5–0	0–3	2–1	2–1	2–1	1–1	3–2	3–0	1–0	5–1	1–1	

Source: AGLeague
Legend: Blue = home team win; Yellow = draw; Red = away team win.
For upcoming matches, an "a" indicates there is an article about the rivalry between the two participants.

== Seasonal statistics ==
=== Positions by round ===
Leader and qualification to AFC Champions League group stage
qualification to AFC Champions League Play off round
Relegation to UAE First Division League

Team ╲ Round	1	2	3	4	5	6	7	8	9	10	11	12	13	14	15	16	17	18	19	20	21	22	23	24	25	26
Al Jazira	7	10	6	5	7	4	3	2	2	2	2	2	2	2	2	2	2	1	1	1	1	2	1	1	1	1
Baniyas	2	1	1	3	3	6	8	7	5	4	4	4	3	3	3	3	3	3	2	2	2	1	2	2	2	2
Shabab Al Ahli	4	4	5	4	5	8	6	6	7	9	8	8	6	6	5	6	6	5	5	5	5	4	3	5	4	3
Sharjah	5	2	2	1	1	1	1	1	1	1	1	1	1	1	1	1	1	2	3	3	3	3	4	3	3	4
Al Nasr	8	6	4	2	2	3	2	3	3	3	3	3	4	4	4	5	5	4	4	4	4	5	5	4	5	5
Al Ain	6	5	8	9	6	5	4	5	6	5	5	5	5	5	6	4	4	6	6	6	6	6	6	6	6	6
Al Wahda	1	7	7	6	4	2	5	4	8	7	6	6	7	7	7	8	7	7	7	8	8	7	8	8	8	7
Kalba	13	9	10	10	10	9	7	8	4	6	7	7	8	9	9	9	9	9	9	9	9	9	7	7	7	8
Al Wasl	12	8	9	8	9	10	10	9	9	10	9	9	9	8	8	7	8	8	8	7	7	8	9	9	9	9
Khor Fakkan	10	11	14	14	13	13	12	11	11	11	11	11	11	11	11	11	11	11	11	11	10	10	10	10	10	10
Al Dhafra	3	3	3	7	8	7	9	10	10	8	10	10	10	10	10	10	10	10	10	10	11	11	11	11	11	11
Ajman	11	13	11	12	11	12	13	13	13	13	13	13	13	12	12	13	13	13	12	12	12	13	12	12	12	12
Fujairah	9	12	13	11	12	11	11	12	12	12	12	12	12	13	13	12	12	12	13	13	13	12	13	13	13	13
Hatta	14	14	12	13	14	14	14	14	14	14	14	14	14	14	14	14	14	14	14	14	14	14	14	14	14	14

Source: UAEproleague

=== Top Scorers ===
As of 15 May 2021

Rank	Player	Club	Goals
1	(United Arab Emirates) Ali Mabkhout	Al Jazira	25
2	(United Arab Emirates) Fabio Lima	Al Wasl	22
3	(Brazil) João Pedro	Baniyas	18
4	(Italy) Igor Coronado	Sharjah	17
5	(Brazil) Welliton	Sharjah	13
5	(Togo) Kodjo Laba	Al Ain	13
7	(Brazil) Igor Jesus	Shabab Al Ahli	12
7	(Togo) Peniel Mlapa	Kalba	12
7	(Slovenia) Tim Matavž	Al Wahda	12
10	(Brazil) Ramon Lopes	Khor Fakkan	11
10	(United Arab Emirates) Sebastián Tagliabúe	Al Nasr	11

=== Clean sheets ===
As of 15 May 2021

Rank	Player	Club	Clean sheets
1	(United Arab Emirates) Fahad Al-Dhanhani	Baniyas	11
2	(United Arab Emirates) Ali Khasif	Al Jazira	10
3	(United Arab Emirates) Majed Naser	Shabab Al Ahli	8
3	(United Arab Emirates) Jamal Al Sarrah	Kalba	8
5	(United Arab Emirates) Ahmed Shambih	Al Nasr	7
5	(United Arab Emirates) Khalid Eisa	Al Ain	7
7	(United Arab Emirates) Mohammed Al-Shamsi	Al Wahda	5
7	(United Arab Emirates) Adel Al-Hosani	Sharjah	5
9	(United Arab Emirates) Ahmed Mahmoud	Khor Fakkan	4
10	(United Arab Emirates) Khaled Al-Senani	Al Dhafra	3
10	(United Arab Emirates) Ali Al-Hosani	Ajman	3
10	(United Arab Emirates) Humaid Al-Najar	Al Wasl	3
10	(United Arab Emirates) Abdullah Al-Tamimi	Fujairah	3

=== Hat-tricks ===
Player	For	Against	Result	Date	Round
(Brazil) Welliton	Sharjah	Al Dhafra	5–0 (H)	3 November 2020	4
(Brazil) Igor Jesus	Shabab Al Ahli	Hatta	3–0 (H)	4 November 2020	4
(United Arab Emirates) Ali Mabkhout	Al Jazira	Al Dhafra	5–1 (A)	5 February 2021	15
(United Arab Emirates) Ali Mabkhout	Al Jazira	Kalba	6–0 (A)	14 February 2021	16
(United Arab Emirates) Fabio Lima^{4}	Al Wasl	Kalba	4–4 (H)	19 February 2021	17
(United Arab Emirates) Ali Mabkhout	Al Jazira	Fujairah	4–2 (H)	15 March 2021	21

Notes

^{4} Player scored 4 goals
(H) – Home team
(A) – Away team

== Number of teams by Emirates ==
	Emirate	Number of teams	Teams
1	(Emirate of Abu Dhabi) Abu Dhabi	5	Al Ain, Al Jazira, Al Wahda, Baniyas and Al Dhafra
2	(Emirate of Dubai) Dubai	4	Shabab Al Ahli, Al Nasr, Al Wasl and Hatta
3	(Emirate of Sharjah) Sharjah	3	Sharjah, Kalba and Khor Fakkan
4	(Emirate of Ajman) Ajman	1	Ajman
4	Fujairah	1	Fujairah
