= 2021–22 UAE Pro League =

47th UAE Pro League Season

UAE Pro League
- Season: 2021–22
- Dates: 19 August 2021 – 26 May 2022
- Champions: Al Ain (14th title)
- Relegated: Al Urooba; Emirates
- Matches: 169
- Goals: 516 (3.05 per match)
- Top goalscorer: Kodjo Laba (26 goals)
- Biggest home win: Al Nasr 5–0 Al Urooba (26 August 2021); Al Ain 5–0 Al Jazira (11 May 2022)
- Biggest away win: Al Urooba 0–4 Al Wahda (19 August 2021); Emirates 0–4 Al Nasr (24 September 2021)
- Highest scoring: Shabab Al Ahli 4–3 Sharjah (10 September 2021)
- Longest winning run: Al Ain (4 games)
- Longest unbeaten run: Al Ain (12 games)
- Longest winless run: Emirates (11 games)
- Longest losing run: Emirates (9 games)
- All statistics correct as of 26 May 2022.

The 2021–22 UAE Pro League was the 47th edition of the UAE Pro League. Al Jazira are the defending champions after clinching their third title in the final day of last season. Al Ain would win its fourteenth title after beating the defending champions Al Jazira 5–0 the eleventh of May.

== Teams ==
=== Team changes ===
==== Promoted to the Pro League ====
Both Al Urooba and Emirates secured promotion on the same day after beating Al Dhaid 3–0 and Masafi 6–0 on the second last matchday. Emirates is returning after getting relegated two seasons ago in 2018–19 season meanwhile Al Urooba is getting promoted back to the top tier after almost three decades of absence, only previously being in the competition in 1992–93 season.

==== Relegated to the First Division ====
On 7 May, despite winning 4–0 against Kalba, Hatta was confirmed relegated back to the First Division after only spending two seasons on the top flight. On 11 May, Fujairah got relegated after a 2–1 defeat to Ajman, both clubs were battling relegation and needed a victory.

=== Stadia and locations ===
Locations of teams in the 2021–22 UAE Pro League

Note: Table lists clubs in alphabetical order.

Team	Home city	Stadium	Capacity
Ajman	Ajman	Ajman Stadium	5,537
Al Ain	Al-Ain	Hazza Bin Zayed Stadium	25,965
Al Dhafra	Madinat Zayed	Al Dhafra Stadium	5,020
Al Jazira	Abu Dhabi (Al Nahyan)	Mohammad Bin Zayed Stadium	42,056
Al Nasr	Dubai (Al Nasr)	Al-Maktoum Stadium	15,058
Al Urooba	Qidfa / Mirbah (Fujairah)	Fujairah Club Stadium	10,645
Al Wahda	Abu Dhabi (Al Nahyan)	Al Nahyan Stadium	12,201
Al Wasl	Dubai (Zabeel)	Zabeel Stadium	8,439
Baniyas	Abu Dhabi (Al Shamkha)	Baniyas Stadium	10,000
Emirates	Ras Al Khaimah	Emirates Club Stadium	5,200
Kalba	Kalba	Ittihad Kalba Stadium	8,500
Khor Fakkan	Khor Fakkan	SBM Al Qassimi Stadium	7,500
Shabab Al Ahli	Dubai (Deira)	Al-Rashid Stadium	12,052
Sharjah	Sharjah	Sharjah Stadium	20,000

== Personnel and kits ==
Note: Flags indicate national team as has been defined under FIFA eligibility rules. Players may hold more than one non-FIFA nationality.

Team	Head Coach	Captain	Kit Manufacturer	Shirt Sponsor
Ajman	(Serbia) Goran Tufegdžić	(United Arab Emirates) Ali Al-Hosani	Adidas	Ajman Bank
Al Ain	(Ukraine) Serhiy Rebrov	(United Arab Emirates) Ismail Ahmed	Nike	First Abu Dhabi Bank
Al Dhafra	(Morocco) Badr Al Idrisi	(United Arab Emirates) Ahmed Ali	Adidas	Ruwais
Al Jazira	(Netherlands) Marcel Keizer	(United Arab Emirates) Ali Khasif	Puma	Healthpoint
Al Nasr	(United Arab Emirates) Salem Rabie	(United Arab Emirates) Tareq Ahmed	N45	Emirates Islamic
Al Urooba	(Tunisia) Fathi Al-Obeidi	(United Arab Emirates) Ahmed Khamis	uhlsport	No sponsor
Al Wahda	(France) Grégory Dufrennes	(United Arab Emirates) Mohammed Barqesh	Umbro	No sponsor
Al Wasl	(Brazil) Odair Hellmann	(United Arab Emirates) Ali Salmeen	Yellow	Emaar
Baniyas	(Romania) Daniel Isăilă	(United Arab Emirates) Fawaz Awana	Macron	No sponsor
Emirates	(Egypt) Ayman El Ramady	(United Arab Emirates) Abdullah Mohammed	uhlsport	No sponsor
Kalba	(Uruguay) Jorge Da Silva	(United Arab Emirates) Mansor Abbas	Adidas	Caltex
Khor Fakkan	(Argentina) Gabriel Calderón	(United Arab Emirates) Saif Mohammed	Macron	No sponsor
Shabab Al Ahli	(United Arab Emirates) Mahdi Ali	(United Arab Emirates) Majed Naser	Nike	Nissan and Omniyat
Sharjah	(Romania) Cosmin Olăroiu	(United Arab Emirates) Shahin Abdulrahman	Adidas	Saif Zone

=== Foreign players ===
All teams could register as many foreign players as they want, but could only register four professional players in the roster.

- Players name in **bold** indicates the player is registered during the mid-season transfer window.
- Players in italics were out of the squad or left the club within the season, after the pre-season transfer window, or in the mid-season transfer window, and at least had one appearance.

Club	Player 1	Player 2	Player 3	Player 4	Former Players
Ajman	(Tunisia) Firas Ben Larbi	(The Gambia) Bubacarr Trawally	(Slovenia) Miral Samardžić	(Morocco) **Walid Azaro**	(Colombia) Yorleys Mena (Lebanon) **Rabih Ataya**
Al Ain	(Argentina) Cristian Guanca	(Morocco) Soufiane Rahimi	(Togo) Kodjo Fo-Doh Laba	(Colombia) **Danilo Arboleda**	(Tunisia) Yassine Meriah
Al Dhafra	(Morocco) Issam El Adoua	(Brazil) **Lucas Cândido**	(Senegal) Makhete Diop	(Brazil) **Guilherme Augusto**	(Nigeria) Imoh Ezekiel (Brazil) Leonardo
Al Jazira	(Brazil) João Victor	(Mali) Abdoulay Diaby	(Serbia) Miloš Kosanović	(South Africa) Thulani Serero	
Al Nasr	(Algeria) Mehdi Abeid	(Cape Verde) Ryan Mendes	(Israel) Dia Saba	(Portugal) Tozé	
Al Urooba	(Bahrain) Ali Madan	(Cameroon) Appolinaire Kack	(Morocco) Rédah Atassi	(Brazil) **Kayke**	(Nigeria) Kingsley Eduwo
Al Wahda	(Brazil) João Pedro	(Portugal) **Adrien Silva**	(Portugal) Fábio Martins	(Ba'athist Syria) Omar Kharbin	(Spain) José Ángel Jurado
Al Wasl	(Brazil) Adryelson	(Brazil) Ramiro	(Brazil) **Gilberto**	(Uruguay) Michel Araújo	(Brazil) William Pottker
Baniyas	(Argentina) Gastón Álvarez Suárez	(Argentina) Nicolás Giménez	(Serbia) Saša Ivković	(Sweden) Isaac Kiese Thelin	
Emirates	(Algeria) Zakaria Boulahia	(Ivory Coast) Joseph Guédé Gnadou	(Dominican Republic) **Edarlyn Reyes**	(Morocco) Walid Sabbar	(Morocco) Adam Ennafati
Kalba	(Austria) Robert Žulj	(Colombia) **Bayron Garcés**	(Peru) Wilder Cartagena	(Togo) Peniel Mlapa	(Hungary) Roland Varga
Khor Fakkan	(Brazil) Dodô	(Brazil) **Souza**	(Brazil) Douglas Tanque	(Portugal) **Aylton Boa Morte**	(Spain) Borja Valle (Spain) Luis Fernández (Iraq) Osama Rashid (Brazil) Paulinho
Shabab Al Ahli	(Argentina) **Federico Cartabia**	(Iran) Ahmad Nourollahi	(Iran) Mehdi Ghayedi	(Norway) **Thomas Lehne Olsen**	(Brazil) Carlos Eduardo (Uzbekistan) Azizjon Ganiev
Sharjah	(Brazil) Bernard	(Brazil) Caio	(Democratic Republic of the Congo) Ben Malango	(Uzbekistan) Otabek Shukurov	

=== Managerial changes ===
Team	Outgoing manager	Date of vacancy	Manner of departure	Pos.	Incoming manager	Date of appointment
Ajman	(Egypt) Ayman El Ramady	15 May 2021	End of contract	Pre-season	(Serbia) Goran Tufegdžić	28 May 2021
Al Ain	(Portugal) Pedro Emanuel	5 June 2021	End of contract	Pre-season	(Ukraine) Serhiy Rebrov	6 June 2021
Emirates	(North Macedonia) Gjoko Hadžievski	30 June 2021	End of contract	Pre-season	(Morocco) Tarik Sektioui	18 August 2021
Al Dhafra	(Syria) Mohammad Kwid	1 October 2021	Sacked	11th	(Brazil) Rogério Micale	2 October 2021
Sharjah	(United Arab Emirates) Abdulaziz Al Anberi	23 October 2021	Mutual consent	5th	(Romania) Cosmin Olăroiu	10 November 2021
Al Wahda	(Netherlands) Henk ten Cate	25 October 2021	Sacked	4th	(France) Grégory Dufrennes	26 October 2021
Emirates	(Morocco) Tarik Sektioui	26 December 2021	Resigned	14th	(Egypt) Ayman El Ramady	27 December 2021
Khor Fakkan	(Brazil) Caio Zanardi	28 December 2021	Sacked	9th	(United Arab Emirates) Abdulmajeed Al-Nimr^{a}	28 December 2021
Khor Fakkan	(United Arab Emirates) Abdulmajeed Al-Nimr	2 February 2022	End of caretaker spell	10th	(Argentina) Gabriel Calderón	2 February 2022
Al Nasr	(Argentina) Ramón Díaz	7 February 2022	Sacked	9th	(United Arab Emirates) Salem Rabie^{a}	8 February 2022
Al Dhafra	(Brazil) Rogério Micale	2 March 2022	Sacked	12th	(Morocco) Badr Al Idrisi^{a}	2 March 2022

_{Notes
1. Caretaker}

== League table ==
Pos	Team	Pld	W	D	L	GF	GA	GD	Pts	Qualification or relegation
1	Al Ain (C)	26	20	5	1	57	17	+40	65	Qualification for AFC Champions League group stage
2	Sharjah	26	17	4	5	46	25	+21	55	
3	Al Wahda	26	15	8	3	51	25	+26	53	
4	Al Jazira	26	14	3	9	42	34	+8	45	
5	Shabab Al Ahli	26	12	6	8	33	30	+3	42	
6	Al Wasl	26	9	9	8	36	30	+6	36	
7	Ajman	26	10	5	11	35	40	−5	35	
8	Al Nasr	26	9	6	11	42	38	+4	33	
9	Baniyas	26	8	7	11	33	39	−6	31	
10	Khor Fakkan	26	8	4	14	38	49	−11	28	
11	Kalba	26	6	10	10	32	38	−6	28	
12	Al Dhafra	26	6	6	14	28	36	−8	24	
13	Al Urooba (R)	26	3	9	14	25	57	−32	18	Relegation to UAE Division 1
14	Emirates (R)	26	2	4	20	21	61	−40	10	Relegation to UAE Division 1

Source: UPLeague
Rules for classification: 1) points; 2) head-to-head goal difference; 3) head-to-head goals scored; 4) head-to-head away goals scored; 5) goal difference; 6) number of goals scored; 7) number of away goals scored; 8) head-to-head points; 9) fair play ranking 10) draw
(C) Champions; (R) Relegated

== Results ==
Home \ Away	AJM	AIN	DHA	JAZ	NAS	URO	WAH	WAS	YAS	EMI	KAL	KHF	SAD	SHR
Ajman		0–4	1–3	2–1	3–0	1–1	2–2	0–0	0–2	0–1	4–3	4–2	1–1	1–0
Al Ain	2–1		1–0	5–0	3–1	1–1	1–1	3–2	2–0	2–0	4–1	4–1	1–0	1–1
Al Dhafra	3–0	0–1		0–3	1–1	2–1	1–3	2–2	1–2	0–0	1–1	4–1	0–1	0–1
Al Jazira	3–0	1–5	2–0		2–1	1–0	1–2	3–2	2–0	3–2	3–2	4–0	2–1	1–0
Al Nasr	0–1	0–1	1–2	2–0		5–0	1–2	3–2	2–2	4–0	0–3	3–0	1–1	0–2
Al Urooba	0–3	3–3	1–1	0–1	1–1		0–4	1–1	2–1	4–2	0–1	1–4	1–1	2–2
Al Wahda	3–0	0–1	3–2	1–1	2–2	4–2		2–1	1–1	4–1	2–0	1–0	0–0	1–2
Al Wasl	2–4	0–2	1–0	2–1	1–2	5–0	1–1		0–0	3–0	1–1	1–1	1–0	0–0
Baniyas	0–2	0–1	2–0	1–1	2–1	2–0	0–1	0–1		3–1	1–1	2–2	4–1	0–4
Emirates	1–3	0–3	0–3 (Note: The Emirates FA announced that Al Dhafra has won the match 3–0 against the Emirates due to an administrative error from Emirates Club. The match originally finished as a 1–1 draw.)	0–3	0–4	0–1	2–4	0–1	2–2		1–1	2–1	0–1	2–2
Kalba	1–1	0–2	2–2	0–0	2–2	2–1	2–1	1–1	1–3	3–1		2–3	0–0	0–1
Khor Fakkan	2–0	1–3	3–0	2–1	4–0	1–1	0–0	0–1	4–2	2–1	0–1		1–2	1–3
Shabab Al Ahli	1–0	1–1	1–0	2–1	1–2	3–1	1–3	0–2	3–1	2–1	2–1	3–1		4–3
Sharjah	2–1	2–0	1–0	2–1	0–3	5–0	0–3	3–2	3–0	2–1	1–0	3–1	1–0	

Source: UPLeague
Legend: Blue = home team win; Yellow = draw; Red = away team win.
For upcoming matches, an "a" indicates there is an article about the rivalry between the two participants.

== Seasonal statistics ==
=== Positions by round ===
Leader and qualification to AFC Champions League group stage
qualification to AFC Champions League Play off round
Relegation to UAE First Division League

Team ╲ Round	1	2	3	4	5	6	7	8	9	10	11	12	13	14	15	16	17	18	19	20	21	22	23	24	25	26
Al Ain	3	1	1	1	1	1	1	1	1	1	1	1	1	1	1	1	1	1	1	1	1	1	1	1	1	1
Sharjah	5	3	2	4	2	3	5	6	8	6	4	4	4	4	3	4	3	3	4	4	4	4	2	2	2	2
Al Wahda	1	4	5	6	7	8	6	4	2	2	2	2	2	2	2	2	2	2	2	2	2	2	3	3	3	3
Al Jazira	4	5	3	2	4	2	3	2	4	5	5	5	5	5	5	5	5	4	3	3	3	3	4	4	4	4
Shabab Al Ahli	7	2	4	3	3	5	2	3	5	4	3	3	3	3	4	3	4	5	5	5	5	5	5	5	5	5
Al Wasl	6	6	7	8	8	7	9	8	9	9	10	8	9	10	6	8	8	9	7	7	6	7	7	6	6	6
Ajman	2	7	6	7	6	4	7	9	7	8	8	10	11	7	7	6	6	8	8	8	8	9	9	8	7	7
Al Nasr	13	8	8	5	5	6	4	5	3	3	6	7	8	9	8	7	7	6	9	9	9	8	6	9	9	8
Baniyas	8	9	12	9	10	10	12	12	11	11	11	11	6	6	9	9	9	7	6	6	7	6	8	7	8	9
Khor Fakkan	11	11	10	12	9	9	8	7	6	7	9	9	10	11	11	11	11	11	11	11	11	11	11	11	11	10
Kalba	10	10	11	11	12	12	11	10	10	10	7	6	7	8	10	10	10	10	10	10	10	10	10	10	10	11
Al Dhafra	12	13	9	10	11	11	10	11	12	12	12	12	12	12	12	12	12	12	12	12	12	12	12	12	12	12
Al Urooba	14	14	13	13	13	13	13	13	13	13	13	13	13	13	13	13	13	13	13	13	13	14	13	13	13	13
Emirates	9	12	14	14	14	14	14	14	14	14	14	14	14	14	14	14	14	14	14	14	14	13	14	14	14	14

Updated to match(es) played on 26 May 2022. Source: UPLeague

=== Top scorers ===
As of 25 May 2022

Rank	Player	Club	Goals
1	(Togo) Kodjo Laba	Al Ain	26
2	(Ba'athist Syria) Omar Kharbin	Al Wahda	15
3	(Brazil) João Pedro	Al Wahda	14
3	(Brazil) Caio Lucas	Sharjah	14
5	(Tunisia) Firas Ben Larbi	Ajman	12
5	(Portugal) Tozé	Al Nasr	12
7	(Israel) Dia Saba	Al Nasr	11
8	(United Arab Emirates) Sebastián Tagliabúe	Al Nasr	10
8	(United Arab Emirates) Ali Mabkhout	Al Jazira	10
8	(Mali) Abdoulay Diaby	Al Jazira	10

=== Clean sheets ===
As of 25 May 2022

Rank	Player	Club	Clean sheets
1	(United Arab Emirates) Khalid Eisa	Al Ain	12
2	(United Arab Emirates) Adel Al-Hosani	Sharjah	9
3	(United Arab Emirates) Mohammed Al-Shamsi	Al Wahda	7
3	(United Arab Emirates) Ali Khasif	Al Jazira	7
5	(United Arab Emirates) Ali Al-Hosani	Ajman	6
6	(United Arab Emirates) Ibrahim Essa	Al Wasl	5
6	(United Arab Emirates) Mohamed Qayoudhi	Al Wasl	5
6	(United Arab Emirates) Abdullah Al-Tamimi	Al Nasr	5

=== Hat-tricks ===
Player	For	Against	Result	Date	Round
(Togo) Kodjo Laba	Al Ain	Al Urooba	3–3 (A)	24 September 2021	5
(Togo) Kodjo Laba	Al Ain	Al Jazira	5–1 (A)	20 November 2021	10
(Togo) Kodjo Laba	Al Ain	Al Jazira	5–0 (H) ^{4}	11 May 2022	23
(Austria) Robert Žulj	Kalba	Emirates	3–1 (H)	11 May 2022	23

Notes

^{4}
(H) – Home team
(A) – Away team

== Awards ==
Month	Manager of the Month		Player of the Month		Goalkeeper of the Month		References
Month	Manager	Club	Player	Club	Player	Club	References
August	(Ukraine) Serhiy Rebrov	Al Ain	(Togo) Kodjo Laba	Al Ain	(United Arab Emirates) Ali Khasif	Al Jazira	
September	(Ukraine) Serhiy Rebrov	Al Ain	(Morocco) Soufiane Rahimi	Al Ain	(United Arab Emirates) Ali Khasif	Al Jazira	
October	(Ukraine) Serhiy Rebrov	Al Ain	(Ivory Coast) Kouame Autonne	Al Ain	(United Arab Emirates) Khalid Eisa	Al Ain	
November	(Ukraine) Serhiy Rebrov	Al Ain	(Morocco) Soufiane Rahimi	Al Ain	(United Arab Emirates) Khalid Eisa	Al Ain	

== Number of teams by Emirates ==
	Emirate	Number of teams	Teams
1	(Emirate of Abu Dhabi) Abu Dhabi	5	Al Ain, Al Jazira, Al Wahda, Baniyas and Al Dhafra
2	(Emirate of Dubai) Dubai	3	Shabab Al Ahli, Al Nasr and Al Wasl
2	(Emirate of Sharjah) Sharjah	3	Sharjah, Kalba and Khor Fakkan
4	(Emirate of Ajman) Ajman	1	Ajman
4	(Emirate of Fujairah) Fujairah	1	Al Urooba
4	(Emirate of Ras Al Khaimah) Ras Al Khaimah	1	Emirates
