= Saif Rashid =

Emirati footballer

Personal information
- Full name: Saif Rashid Nasir Ahmed Al-Shemili
- Date of birth: 25 November 1994 (age 31)
- Place of birth: Sharjah, United Arab Emirates
- Height: 1.69 m (5 ft 6 1/2 in)
- Position: Winger

Team information
- Current team: Dubai United
- Number: 66

Senior career*
Years	Team	Apps	(Gls)
2011–2023	Al-Sharjah	147	(11)
2022–2023	→ Al Bataeh (loan)	19	(1)
2023–2025	Ajman	11	(0)
2025–	Dubai United	0	(0)

International career
2018–2019	United Arab Emirates	9	(1)
- * Club domestic league appearances and goals as of 1 August 2024

Saif Rashid Nasir Ahmed Al-Shemili (Arabic: سيف راشد ناصر أحمد الشميلي; born 25 November 1994) is an Emirati footballer who plays for Dubai United as a winger.

== International career ==
=== International goals ===
Scores and results list the United Arab Emirates' goal tally first.

#	Date	Venue	Opponent	Score	Result	Competition
1.	20 November 2018	Zabeel Stadium, Dubai	Yemen	1–0	2–0	Friendly

== Honours ==
Runners-up

- UAE Division 1 Group A: 2012–13
- UAE League Cup: 2014–15

Winners

- UAE Pro-League: 2018–19
- UAE Super Cup: 2019
