= Mohammed Abdulbasit =

Emirati footballer (born 1995)

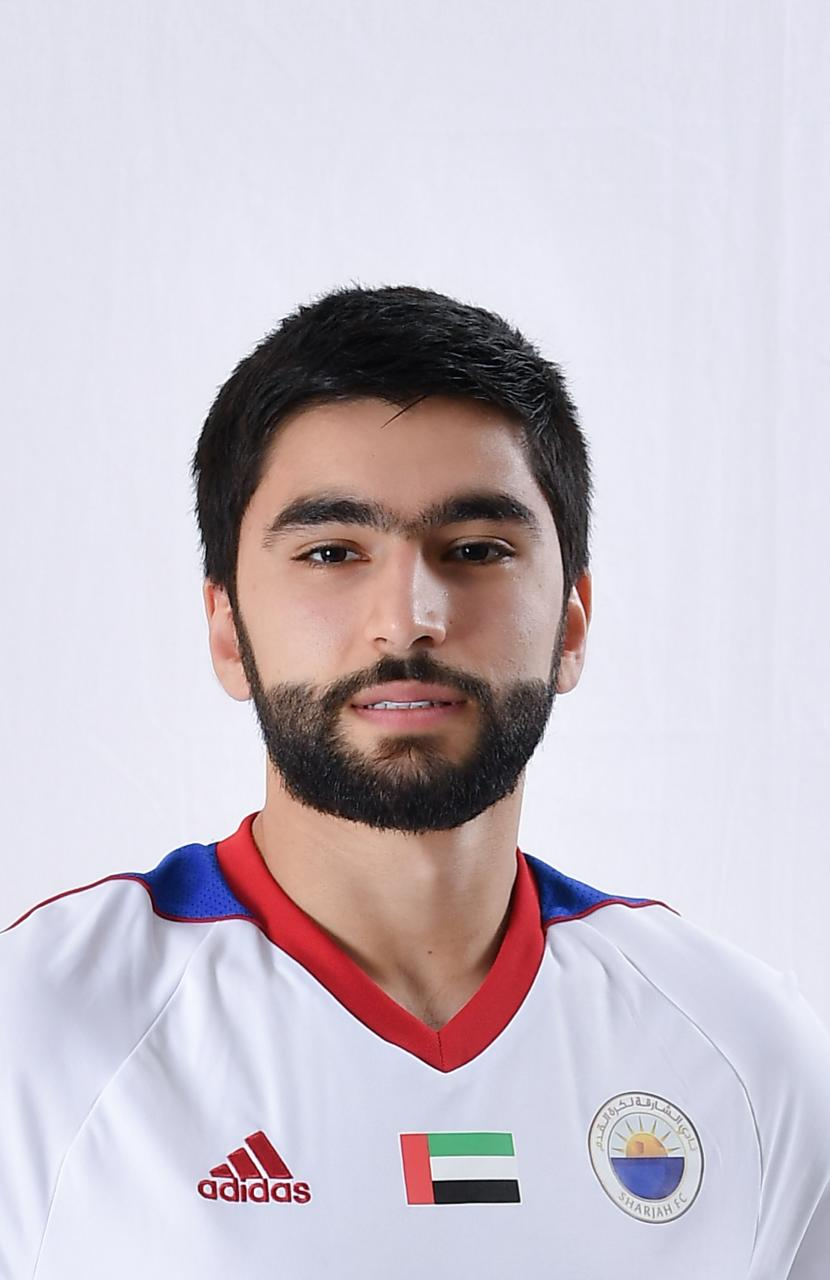

Personal information
- Full name: Mohammed Abdulbasit Al Abdullah
- Date of birth: 19 October 1995 (age 31)
- Place of birth: Dubai, United Arab Emirates
- Height: 1.75 m (5 ft 9 in)
- Position: Defensive midfielder

Team information
- Current team: Al-Nasr
- Number: 8

Youth career
- 2005–2013: Al-Ahli

Senior career*
Years	Team	Apps	(Gls)
2013–2014	Al Ahli	0	(0)
2014	→ Ajman (loan)	8	(0)
2014–2019	Al Wahda	74	(0)
2019–2025	Sharjah	88	(1)
2025–	Al-Nasr	0	(0)

International career
2022–	United Arab Emirates	5	(0)
- * Club domestic league appearances and goals

Mohammed Abdulbasit (Arabic:محمد عبد الباسط) (born 19 October 1995) is an Emirati footballer. He currently plays as a defensive midfielder for Al-Nasr.

== Club career ==
=== Al Ahli ===
Mohammed Abdulbasit is an Emirati professional footballer born in the United Arab Emirates. The defensive midfielder began his career in the Al-Ahli youth team, joining when he was 10-years-old.

==== Ajman (loan) ====
At 18-years-old he moved to Ajman on a six-month loan deal in 2014, making his senior and Arabian Gulf League debut on February 7, 2014, in a 1–0 win over Al Jazira. He was praised by Ajman coach Abdulwahab Abdulqadir for his performance in upsetting the title-chasing team, playing a pivotal role as the club ended an 11-match winless run. The midfielder would feature seven more times as Ajman finished 10th in the 2013–14 campaign.

=== Al Wahda (2014–19) ===
In September 2014, Abdulbasit joined Abu Dhabi club Al Wahda as part of a deal which saw defender Essa Santo move in the opposite direction to Al Ahli. It was at Wahda the teenager began to develop. He made his league debut for the club in a 2–1 defeat against his former side Al Ahli on December 15, coming on as a substitute in the 86th minute. He made his full league debut against Al Nasr, playing 90 minutes in a 2–0 victory. He featured strongly for the rest of the campaign as Al Wahda finished fourth in the 2014–15 season.

In 2015–16, Abdulbasit played a prominent role as Al Wahda qualified for the AFC Champions League by finishing third. They were also crowned Arabian Gulf Cup champions after beating Al Shabab 1–0 in the final, Abdulbasit played in the showpiece as the club ended a four-year wait for a trophy. The following season Abdulbasit cemented his place in the starting XI and would go on to enjoy more success with the Clarets. He made his AFC Champions League debut against Jordanian outfit Al Wihdat on February 7, 2017, and would then secure his second piece of silverware as Wahda thumped Al Nasr 3–0 to capture the UAE President's Cup.

More trophies followed for Abdulbasit in 2017–18 as the Clarets claimed the Arabian Gulf Super Cup in the season's curtain raiser, the defensive midfielder started the 2–0 victory over Abu Dhabi rivals Al Jazira before being substituted in the 76th minute with the trophy all-but secured. Abdulbasit scored his first senior professional goal in the Arabian Gulf Cup, hammering home from just outside the box in Wahda's 4–2 victory over Emirates Club. His disappointment of falling just short of the league title, Wahda finished second to champions Al Ain, was partially healed by a domestic cup double as he played the full 90 minutes in the 2–1 defeat of Al Wasl in the Arabian Gulf Cup final.

Another Arabian Gulf Super Cup title was captured ahead of the 2018–19 season after a whirlwind clash with Al Ain. Abdulbasit played the full 90, plus extra-time as the game ended 3–3 and was decided on penalties with Wahda winning 4–3 in the shootout. The Clarets finished third in the Arabian Gulf League, 13 points off champions Sharjah, which meant qualification for the AFC Champions League Qualifiers.

=== Sharjah (2019–25) ===
Ahead of the 2019–20 season, Abdulbasit switched to reigning Arabian Gulf League champions Sharjah for an undisclosed fee. He signed a three-year contract and began life at the King with another Arabian Gulf Super Cup triumph as the league winners beat Shabab Al Ahli Dubai Club on penalties. He featured 14 times in his debut AGL season for the club before the 2019–20 campaign was cancelled due to the COVID-19 pandemic.

=== Al-Nasr (2025–) ===
Ahead of the 2025–26 season, Abdulbasit switched to reigning Al-Nasr for an undisclosed for free.

== Honours ==
=== Club ===
Al Wahda

- UAE President's Cup: 2016–17
- UAE League Cup: 2015–16, 2017–18
- UAE Super Cup: 2017, 2018

Sharjah

- UAE President's Cup: 2021–22, 2022–23
- UAE League Cup: 2022–23
- UAE Super Cup: 2019, 2022
- AFC Champions League Two: 2024–25
