= Abdullah Ghanem =

Emirati footballer (born 1995)

Personal information
- Full name: Abdullah Ghanem Jumaa
- Date of birth: 21 May 1995 (age 31)
- Place of birth: Sharjah, United Arab Emirates
- Height: 1.80 m (5 ft 11 in)
- Position: Left-back

Team information
- Current team: Sharjah
- Number: 18

Youth career
- Sharjah

Senior career*
Years	Team	Apps	(Gls)
2013–	Sharjah	163	(2)

International career
2019–	UAE	1	(0)
- * Club domestic league appearances and goals

Abdullah Ghanem Jumaa (Arabic: عبد الله غانم; born 21 May 1995) is an Emirati footballer. He currently plays as a left back for Sharjah.

== Honours ==
Sharjah

- UAE Pro League: 2018–19
- UAE President's Cup: 2021–22, 2022–23
- UAE League Cup: 2022–23
- UAE Super Cup: 2019, 2022
- AFC Champions League Two: 2024–25
