= 2022 UAE Super Cup =

- Event: Super Cup
Al Ain	Sharjah
AGL	Cup
0	1
- Date: 25 February 2023
- Venue: Al Maktoum Stadium, Dubai
- Referee: Szymon Marciniak
- Attendance: 14,890
- Weather: Clear; 20 °C (68 °F) humidity 50%

The 2022 UAE Super Cup was the 15th professional and 21st overall UAE Super Cup, an annual football match played between the winners of the previous season's League and President's Cup. It was contested between the league champions Al Ain and president's cup winner Sharjah. Sharjah won their third super cup title after Kodjo Laba's own goal in the 29th minute costed Al Ain the match.

== Details ==
25 February 2023
20:30

Al Ain	0–1	Sharjah
	Report	Laba 29' (o.g.)

Al Maktoum Stadium, Dubai
Referee: Szymon Marciniak

Al Ain	Sharjah

GK	17	(United Arab Emirates) Khalid Eisa
RB	24	(United Arab Emirates) Bandar Al-Ahbabi (c)	(yellow card) 58'
CB	16	(Croatia) Tin Jedvaj	(yellow card) 66'
CB	3	(United Arab Emirates) Kouame Autonne
LB	15	(Brazil) Erik
MF	2	(Morocco) El Mehdi El Moubarik	(substituted off) 61'
MF	13	(United Arab Emirates) Ahmed Barman	(substituted off) 77'
RW	10	(Ukraine) Andriy Yarmolenko	(substituted off) 45+1'
CM	18	(United Arab Emirates) Khalid Al-Balochi	(substituted off) 61'
DF	21	(Morocco) Soufiane Rahimi
ST	9	(Togo) Kodjo Laba
Substitutes:
GK	1	(United Arab Emirates) Mohammed Abo Sandah
MF	6	(United Arab Emirates) Yahia Nader	(substituted on) 61' (yellow card) 90+4'
AM	7	(United Arab Emirates) Caio Canedo	(substituted on) 45+1'
CM	20	(Argentina) Matías Palacios	(substituted on) 61'
CM	22	(United Arab Emirates) Saeed Ahmed
CB	23	(United Arab Emirates) Mohamed Ahmed
RB	29	(United Arab Emirates) Omar Saeed
LB	34	(Brazil) Rafael Pereira
RB	78	(United Arab Emirates) Falah Waleed	(substituted on) 77'
Manager:
(Ukraine) Serhiy Rebrov

GK	40	(United Arab Emirates) Adel Al-Hosani
RB	19	(United Arab Emirates) Khaled Ibrahim
CB	4	(United Arab Emirates) Shahin Abdulrahman (c)
CB	44	(Greece) Kostas Manolas	(substituted off) 11'
LB	3	(United Arab Emirates) Al Hassan Saleh
CF	30	(Guinea) Ousmane Camara
MF	8	(United Arab Emirates) Mohammed Abdulbasit	(yellow card) 31' (substituted off) 65'
MF	88	(United Arab Emirates) Majed Hassan	(substituted off) 76'
AM	27	(Brazil) Luanzinho	(substituted off) 75'
CF	21	(Cape Verde) Djaniny	(substituted off) 76'
LW	7	(Brazil) Caio Lucas
Substitutes:
CB	2	(Brazil) Gustavo Alemão	(substituted on) 11' (yellow card) 89'
CM	6	(United Arab Emirates) Majed Suroor	(substituted on) 76'
ST	9	(Spain) Paco Alcácer	(substituted on) 76'
MF	14	(United Arab Emirates) Khaled Ba Wazir
LB	18	(United Arab Emirates) Abdullah Ghanem
RB	22	(Brazil) Marcus Meloni	(substituted on) 75'
CF	23	(United Arab Emirates) Salem Saleh
MF	24	(United Arab Emirates) Majid Rashid	(substituted on) 65'
GK	26	(United Arab Emirates) Darwish Bin Habib
Manager:
(Romania) Cosmin Olăroiu (red card) 90+6'
