= Ricardo Gomes (Cape Verdean footballer) =

Cape Verdean footballer

Personal information
- Full name: Ricardo Jorge Pires Gomes
- Date of birth: 18 December 1991 (age 34)
- Place of birth: Santa Maria, Cape Verde
- Height: 1.80 m (5 ft 11 in)
- Position: Forward

Team information
- Current team: Al-Khor
- Number: 11

Youth career
- Batuque
- 2009–2010: Vizela

Senior career*
Years	Team	Apps	(Gls)
2010−2013	Vizela	73	(12)
2013−2016	Vitória Guimarães	21	(1)
2013−2016	Vitória Guimarães B	53	(13)
2016	→ Nacional (loan)	15	(1)
2016−2018	Nacional	60	(22)
2018−2019	Partizan	36	(20)
2019−2021	Sharjah	14	(6)
2020	→ Kalba (loan)	5	(1)
2020−2021	→ BB Erzurumspor (loan)	31	(5)
2021−2023	Partizan	70	(48)
2023−2024	Al-Shamal	22	(12)
2024−2025	Al-Wakrah	14	(8)
2025	→ Al-Khor (loan)	8	(5)
2025−	Al-Khor	12	(4)

International career
2015−2020	Cape Verde	14	(4)
- * Club domestic league appearances and goals as of 04:24, 1 May 2026 (UTC)

Ricardo Jorge Pires Gomes (born 18 December 1991) is a Cape Verdean professional footballer who plays as a forward for Qatari Second Division club Al-Khor.

== Club career ==
=== Vitória Guimarães ===
Born in Santa Maria, Ilha do Sal, Gomes moved to Portugal at the age of 17, starting playing football with F.C. Vizela and going on to spend four seasons in the third division. In 2013 he signed with Vitória de Guimarães, being initially assigned to the reserves who also competed at that level.

Gomes made his Primeira Liga debut with the first team on 17 August 2013, coming on as a second-half substitute in a 2−0 home win against S.C. Olhanense. He scored his first goal in the competition on 4 January 2015, in the 4−0 victory over C.D. Nacional also at the Estádio D. Afonso Henriques.

=== Nacional ===
In mid-January 2016, Gomes was loaned to precisely Nacional, until June. On 8 August, he agreed to a two-year permanent deal with the Madeirans.

After no goals in 2016−17, which ended in relegation, the following campaign Gomes led the LigaPro scoring charts at 22 to help the team achieve immediate promotion as champions.

=== Partizan ===
On 8 June 2018, Gomes signed with Serbian club FK Partizan. On 26 August he scored his first SuperLiga goal for them, helping to a 3−1 away defeat of FK Mačva Šabac. He added another on 23 September in the 1−1 draw with Red Star Belgrade in the Eternal Derby, being subsequently voted by Mozzart Sport as his side's best player.

Gomes finished his only season with 26 goals in all competitions, which made him the joint-best foreigner in Partizan's history.

=== Sharjah ===
In August 2019, Gomes joined UAE Pro League champions Sharjah FC, helping to win the UAE Super Cup on penalties shortly after his arrival. The following February, he was loaned to fellow league club Al-Ittihad Kalba SC until the end of the season.

=== Return to Partizan ===
On 25 June 2021, Gomes returned to Partizan and signed a three-year contract. He scored six goals in his first seven competitive appearances, including braces in 4–0 away league wins against FK Proleter Novi Sad and FK Kolubara. He totalled 38 for the campaign for the runners-up, being voted the league's best player and scorer while breaking Mateja Kežman's 2000 record.

== International career ==
Gomes earned his first cap for Cape Verde on 31 March 2015, playing the last ten minutes of the 2–0 friendly win over Portugal in Estoril. On 4 June 2016 he netted his first goal, in the 2–1 away victory against São Tomé and Príncipe in the 2017 Africa Cup of Nations qualifiers.

== Career statistics ==
=== International ===
Appearances and goals by national team and year
National team	Year	Apps	Goals
Cape Verde	2015	1	0
Cape Verde	2016	4	1
Cape Verde	2017	1	0
Cape Verde	2018	4	3
Cape Verde	2019	2	0
Cape Verde	2020	2	0
Total		14	4

Cape Verde score listed first, score column indicates score after each Gomes goal.

International goals by date, venue, opponent, score, result and competition
No.	Date	Venue	Cap	Opponent	Score	Result	Competition
1	4 June 2016	12 de Julho, São Tomé, São Tomé and Príncipe	3	São Tomé and Príncipe	1–0	2–1	2017 Africa Cup of Nations qualification
2	1 June 2018	July 5, 1962 Stadium, Algiers, Algeria	7	Algeria	1–1	3–2	Friendly
3	12 October 2018	Estádio Nacional, Praia, Cape Verde	9	Tanzania	1–0	3–0	2019 Africa Cup of Nations qualification
4	12 October 2018	Estádio Nacional, Praia, Cape Verde	9	Tanzania	2–0	3–0	2019 Africa Cup of Nations qualification

== Honours ==
Vitória Guimarães

- Supertaça Cândido de Oliveira runner-up: 2013

Nacional

- LigaPro: 2017–18

Partizan

- Serbian Cup: 2018–19

Sharjah

- UAE Super Cup: 2019

Individual

- LigaPro top scorer/MVP: 2017–18
- Serbian SuperLiga top scorer/MVP: 2021–22 (29 goals), 2022–23 (19 goals)
- Serbian SuperLiga Team of the Season: 2022–23
- Serbian SuperLiga Player of the Month: September 2022
