= Majed Hassan =

Emirati footballer (born 1992)

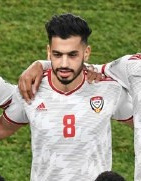
- Hassan with United Arab Emirates in 2019

Personal information
- Full name: Majed Hassan
- Date of birth: 1 August 1992 (age 34)
- Place of birth: Dubai, United Arab Emirates
- Height: 1.82 m (6 ft 0 in)
- Position: Defensive midfielder

Team information
- Current team: Sharjah
- Number: 88

Youth career
- 2007–2010: Al Ahli

Senior career*
Years	Team	Apps	(Gls)
2010–2022	Shabab Al Ahli	175	(4)
2022–	Sharjah	14	(0)

International career^{‡}
2008–2010	United Arab Emirates U17	4	(0)
2012–	United Arab Emirates	71	(1)
- * Club domestic league appearances and goals ‡ National team caps and goals as of 1 August 2026

Majed Hassan (Arabic: ماجد حسن; born 1 August 1992) is an Emirati footballer who plays as a defensive midfielder for Sharjah and the United Arab Emirates national team.

== Career statistics ==
=== International ===
As of match played 11 October 2025

Appearances and goals by national team and year
National team	Year	Apps	Goals
United Arab Emirates	2012	3	0
United Arab Emirates	2013	13	1
United Arab Emirates	2014	10	0
United Arab Emirates	2015	10	0
United Arab Emirates	2016	3	0
United Arab Emirates	2017	–	
United Arab Emirates	2018	9	0
United Arab Emirates	2019	3	0
United Arab Emirates	2020	–	
United Arab Emirates	2021	9	0
United Arab Emirates	2022	8	0
United Arab Emirates	2023	1	0
United Arab Emirates	2024	–	
United Arab Emirates	2025	2	0
Total		71	1

Scores and results list the United Arab Emirates' goal tally first, score column indicates score after each Hassan goal.

List of international goals scored by Majed Hassan
No.	Date	Venue	Opponent	Score	Result	Competition
1	8 January 2013	Bahrain National Stadium, Riffa, Bahrain	Bahrain	2–1	2–1	21st Arabian Gulf Cup

== Honours ==
Shabab Al Ahli

- UAE Pro League: 2013–14, 2015–16
- UAE President's Cup: 2012–13, 2018–19, 2020–21
- UAE League Cup: 2011–12, 2013–14, 2016–17, 2018–19, 2020–21
- UAE Super Cup: 2013, 2014, 2016, 2020
- AFC Champions League runners-up: 2015

Sharjah

- UAE President's Cup: 2021–22, 2022–23
- UAE League Cup: 2022–23
- UAE Super Cup: 2022, 2025
- AFC Champions League Two: 2024–25
- Qatar-UAE Super Cup: 2026

United Arab Emirates

- Arabian Gulf Cup: 2013
- AFC Asian Cup third-place: 2015
