= 2019 UAE Super Cup =

| Sharjah | Shabab Al Ahli |
| AGL | Cup |
| 0 | 0 |
- Sharjah won 4–3 on penalties
- Date: 14 September 2019
- Venue: Al Maktoum Stadium, Dubai
- Referee: Mohammed Obaid Khadem
- Attendance: 9,241

The 2019 UAE Super Cup was the 12th professional and 19th overall UAE Super Cup, an annual football match played between the winners of the previous season's Pro-League and President's Cup.

It was contested at the Al Maktoum Stadium, between Sharjah and Shabab Al Ahli, winners of 2018–19 Pro-League and 2018–19 President's Cup, respectively.

== Details ==
14 September 2019
21:30

| Sharjah | 0–0 | Shabab Al Ahli |
|---|---|---|
| | Report |
Penalties
| Coronado (penalty missed); Shukurov (penalty scored); Ricardo Gomes (penalty scored); Al-Shehhi (penalty scored); Mandes (penalty scored) | 4–3 | (penalty scored) Khalil; (penalty missed) Cartabia; (penalty missed) Luvannor; (penalty scored) Jaber; (penalty scored) Leonardo |

Al Maktoum Stadium, Dubai
Attendance: 9,241
Referee: Mohammed Obaid Khadem

| Sharjah | Shabab Al Ahli |

| GK | 40 | (United Arab Emirates) Adel Al-Hosani (c) | (yellow card) 90+5' |
| CB | 4 | (United Arab Emirates) Shahin Abdulrahman | (yellow card) 44' | (substituted off) 88' |
| CB | 18 | (United Arab Emirates) Abdullah Ghanem |
| LB | 17 | (United Arab Emirates) Ali Al-Dhanhani | | (substituted off) 90+6' |
| DM | 6 | (United Arab Emirates) Majed Suroor |
| RB | 3 | (United Arab Emirates) Al Hassan Saleh | (red card) 31' |
| RW | 20 | (Cape Verde) Ryan Mendes | (yellow card) 82' |
| AM | 10 | (Brazil) Igor Coronado |
| DM | 29 | (Uzbekistan) Otabek Shukurov | (yellow card) 21' |
| LW | 7 | (Cape Verde) Ricardo Gomes |
| ST | 11 | (United Arab Emirates) Omar Jumaa | | (substituted off) 46' |
Substitutes:
| MF | 8 | (United Arab Emirates) Mohammed Abdulbasit |
| DF | 13 | (United Arab Emirates) Salem Sultan | | (substituted on) 88' |
| MF | 15 | (United Arab Emirates) Mohamed Al-Shehhi | | (substituted on) 46' |
| DF | 21 | (United Arab Emirates) Fawzi Fayez |
| DF | 22 | (Brazil) Marcos Meloni |
| MF | 24 | (United Arab Emirates) Saif Rashid | | (substituted on) 90+6' |
| MF | 30 | (United Arab Emirates) Tareq Al-Khodaim |
| MF | 38 | (United Arab Emirates) Mohammed Khalfan |
| GK | 49 | (United Arab Emirates) Mayed Mohsen |
Manager:
(United Arab Emirates) Abdulaziz Al Yassi

| GK | 55 | (United Arab Emirates) Majed Naser |
| DM | 20 | (United Arab Emirates) Yousif Jaber |
| CB | 5 | (United Arab Emirates) Walid Abbas (c) |
| RB | 9 | (United Arab Emirates) Abdulaziz Haikal |
| CB | 4 | (United Arab Emirates) Mohammed Marzooq |
| DM | 88 | (United Arab Emirates) Majed Hassan | | (substituted off) 13' |
| DM | 8 | (United Arab Emirates) Waleed Hussain |
| AM | 80 | (Switzerland) Davide Mariani | | (substituted off) 62' |
| LW | 42 | (Brazil) Leonardo |
| RW | 90 | (Moldova) Henrique Luvannor |
| ST | 30 | (United Arab Emirates) Mohammed Jumaa | (yellow card) 64' |
Substitutes:
| DF | 3 | (United Arab Emirates) Abdulaziz Al-Kaebi |
| MF | 6 | (United Arab Emirates) Saoud Abdulrazaq |
| FW | 11 | (United Arab Emirates) Ahmed Khalil | | (substituted on) 75' |
| MF | 15 | (United Arab Emirates) Abdullah Al-Naqbi | | (substituted on) 13' (substituted off) 75' |
| GK | 17 | (United Arab Emirates) Hassan Hamza |
| DF | 18 | (United Arab Emirates) Mohammed Ismaeel |
| MF | 25 | (Comoros) Ahmed Jashak |
| MF | 26 | (United Arab Emirates) Hassan Ibrahim Saqer |
| FW | 99 | (Argentina) Federico Cartabia | | (substituted on) 62' |
Manager:
(Argentina) Rodolfo Arruabarrena

== See also ==
- 2018–19 UAE Pro-League
- 2018–19 UAE President's Cup
