= Azizjon Ganiev =

Uzbek footballer

Personal information
- Full name: Azizjon Alijon oʻgʻli Gʻaniyev
- Date of birth: 22 February 1998 (age 28)
- Place of birth: Jizzakh, Uzbekistan
- Height: 1.78 m (5 ft 10 in)
- Position: Midfielder

Team information
- Current team: Al Bataeh
- Number: 6

Senior career*
Years	Team	Apps	(Gls)
2014–2019	Nasaf	92	(7)
2020–2024	Shabab Al-Ahli	68	(5)
2024–	Al Bataeh	30	(3)

International career^{‡}
2016	Uzbekistan U-19	3	(0)
2018–2020	Uzbekistan U-23	15	(3)
2017–	Uzbekistan	21	(0)
Medal record
Representing Uzbekistan
Men's football
CAFA Nations Cup
Winner	2025 Tajikistan–Uzbekistan	Team
AFC U-23 Championship
Gold medal – first place	2018 China	Team
- * Club domestic league appearances and goals as of 4 November 2025 ‡ National team caps and goals as of 28 June 2023

Azizjon Alijonovich Ganiev (Uzbek: Azizjon Alijon oʻgʻli Gʻaniyev, Азизжон Алижон ўғли Ғаниев; born 22 February 1998) is an Uzbek footballer who plays as a midfielder for Al Bataeh and the Uzbekistan national team.

== Career ==
=== Club career ===
Played for the youth team Nasaf Since 2014, he has been involved in the main team. In early December 2016, information appeared about the interest of Zenit Saint Petersburg.

=== International career ===
Ganiev made his international debut for Uzbekistan on November 14, 2017, during a friendly match against United Arab Emirates.

On 2 June 2026, he was included in the 26-man squad selected by head coach Fabio Cannavaro for the 2026 FIFA World Cup, marking the country's first-ever appearance in the tournament. On 23 June 2026 , He scored a memorable super goal during the 2026 World Cup, in the second week of the tournament when his team faced Portugal. However, due to Fayzullaev's foul on João Cancelo in the buildup to the play, his stunning strike—a brilliant shot from outside the box—was disallowed.

== Career statistics ==
=== Club ===
As of match played 9 December 2023

Appearances and goals by club, season and competition
Club	Season	League			National cup		Continental		Other		Total	
Club	Season	Division	Apps	Goals	Apps	Goals	Apps	Goals	Apps	Goals	Apps	Goals
Nasaf	2014	USL	1	0	1	0	–		–		2	0
Nasaf	2015	USL	9	0	2	0	–		–		11	0
Nasaf	2016	USL	17	0	4	0	4	0	1	0	26	0
Nasaf	2017	USL	27	2	6	0	2	0	–		35	2
Nasaf	2018	USL	15	3	1	0	7	2	–		23	5
Nasaf	2019	USL	23	2	3	1	–		–		26	3
Total			92	7	17	1	13	2	1	0	123	10
Shabab Al-Ahli	2020–21	UPL	15	1	3	0	7	1	1	0	26	2
Shabab Al-Ahli	2021–22	UPL	8	0	2	0	–				10	0
Shabab Al-Ahli	2022–23	UPL	26	3	2	0	6	3	0	0	34	6
Shabab Al-Ahli	2023–24	UPL	8	1	2	1	2	1	–		12	3
Career total			149	12	25	2	28	7	2	0	204	20

=== International ===
Uzbekistan national team
Year	Apps	Goals
2017	1	0
2018	2	0
2019	1	0
2020	3	0
2021	3	0
2022	1	0
2023	3	0
Total	14	0

Statistics accurate as of match played 13 October 2023

== Honours ==
=== Club ===
Nasaf

- Uzbekistan Cup: 2015
- Uzbekistan Super Cup: 2016

Shabab Al Ahli

- UAE Pro League: 2022–23
- UAE Super Cup: 2020
- UAE League Cup: 2020–21
- UAE Presidents Cup: 2020–21

=== International ===
Uzbekistan U-23

- AFC U-23 Championship (champion): 2018
