= Adel Al-Hosani =

Emirati footballer (born 1989)

Personal information
- Full name: Adel Moahammed Al-Hosani
- Date of birth: 23 August 1989 (age 37)
- Place of birth: Ajman, United Arab Emirates
- Height: 1.80 m (5 ft 11 in)
- Position: Goalkeeper

Team information
- Current team: Sharjah
- Number: 40

Youth career
- Al-Wahda

Senior career*
Years	Team	Apps	(Gls)
2008–2017	Al-Wahda	107	(0)
2017	→ Sharjah (loan)	6	(0)
2017–	Sharjah	184	(0)

International career^{‡}
2015-	United Arab Emirates	1	(0)
- * Club domestic league appearances and goals as of 17 September 2026 ‡ National team caps and goals as of 28 September 2023

Adel Moahammed Al-Hosani (Arabic: عادل الحوسني; born 23 August 1989) is an Emirati footballer who captains Al Sharjah SC.

== International career ==
Adel competed in the 2010 Asian Games in Guangzhou where the United Arab Emirates national team finished as silver medalists.

== Honours ==
Al Wahda

- UAE Pro League: 2009–10
- UAE President's Cup: 2016–17
- UAE League Cup: 2015–16
- UAE Super Cup: 2011

Sharjah

- UAE Pro League: 2018–19
- UAE President's Cup: 2021–22, 2022–23
- UAE League Cup: 2022–23
- UAE Super Cup: 2019, 2022
- AFC Champions League Two: 2024–25
