= Majed Suroor =

Emirati footballer (born 1997)

Personal information
- Full name: Majed Abdulla Ahmad Suroor
- Date of birth: 14 October 1997 (age 29)
- Place of birth: Sharjah, United Arab Emirates
- Height: 1.84 m (6 ft 1/2 in)
- Position: Midfielder

Team information
- Current team: Sharjah
- Number: 6

Youth career
- –2015: Al-Sharjah

Senior career*
Years	Team	Apps	(Gls)
2015–	Al-Sharjah	123	(3)
2024–2025	→ Al Wasl (loan)	11	(0)

International career
2018–	United Arab Emirates	4	(0)
- * Club domestic league appearances and goals

Majed Abdulla Ahmad Suroor (Arabic: ماجد سرور; born 14 October 1997) is an Emirati footballer who plays for Al Wasl, on loan from Al-Sharjah.

== Honours ==
Sharjah

- UAE Pro-League: 2018–19
- UAE Super Cup: 2019
