= Caio Lucas =

Emirati footballer (born 1994)

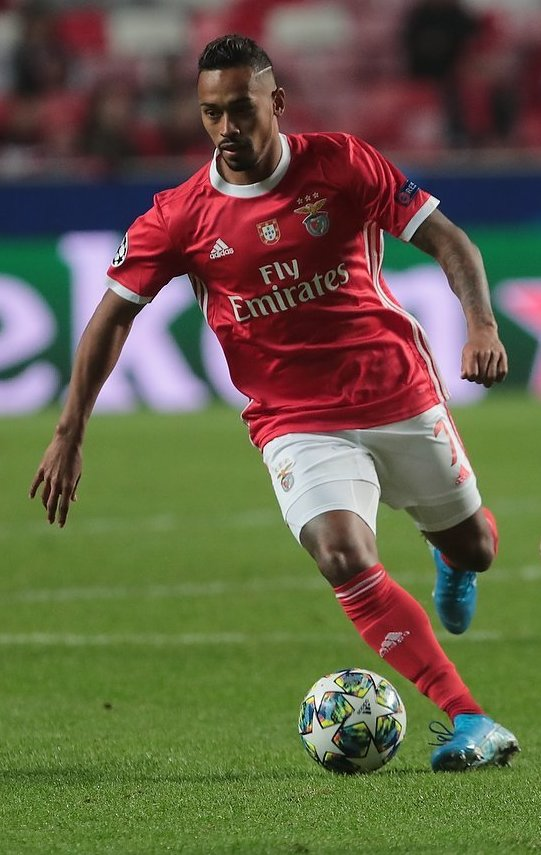
- Caio Lucas playing for Benfica in 2019

Personal information
- Full name: Caio Lucas Fernandes
- Date of birth: 19 April 1994 (age 32)
- Place of birth: Araçatuba, São Paulo, Brazil
- Height: 1.74 m (5 ft 9 in)
- Position: Winger

Team information
- Current team: Sharjah
- Number: 7

Youth career
- 2002–2005: América-SP
- 2005–2009: São Paulo
- 2009–2011: América-SP
- 2011–2013: Chiba Kokusai High School

Senior career*
Years	Team	Apps	(Gls)
2014–2016	Kashima Antlers	78	(23)
2016–2019	Al Ain	65	(24)
2019–2021	Benfica	4	(1)
2020–2021	→ Sharjah (loan)	27	(8)
2021–	Sharjah	107	(46)

International career^{‡}
2025–	United Arab Emirates	13	(4)
- * Club domestic league appearances and goals as of 25 May 2025 ‡ National team caps and goals as of 18 December 2025

Caio Lucas Fernandes (born 19 April 1994), known as Caio Lucas or just Caio [ˈkajju], is a professional footballer who plays as a winger for UAE Pro League club Sharjah. Born in Brazil, he represents the United Arab Emirates at international level.

== Club career ==
Born in Araçatuba, São Paulo, Caio Lucas started playing football in 2002, aged 8, at local clubs SMER Bosque Araçatuba and América-SP.

He then played for São Paulo's youth teams from 2005 to 2009 but could not become professional, so he left the club and unsuccessfully tried to join rivals Santos and Palmeiras before returning to América.

In 2011, when he was prepared to give up on football, he was discovered by a Japanese university that was playing in Birigui, Brazil. Almost aged 17, he moved to Japan that year to enroll in Chiba Kokusai High School in Kimitsu, where he played for three years.

After his graduation, Caio Lucas joined the J1 League club, the Kashima Antlers in 2014. In his first professional season, under the coaching of Toninho Cerezo, Caio scored eight goals as Kashima Antlers qualified for the AFC Champions League. Moreover, he was named J. League's Young Player of the Year in 2014 and won the 2016 J1 League and 2015 J.League Cup.

In 2019, following a three-year spell with Emirati club Al Ain, with whom he reached the 2018 FIFA Club World Cup Final, Caio signed a four-year contract with Portuguese club Benfica.

On 23 January 2020, Sharjah signed Caio Lucas from Benfica on loan for 18 months.

== International career ==
Born in Brazil, Caio Lucas became a naturalized Emirati and was called up to the United Arab Emirates national team for the first time by manager Paulo Bento in March 2025 for 2026 FIFA World Cup qualifying matches. He made his debut for the UAE in a 2–0 loss to Iran on 20 March.

== Career statistics ==
=== Club ===
As of match played 25 May 2025

Appearances and goals by club, season and competition
Club	Season	League			National cup (Note: Includes Emperor's Cup, UAE President's Cup, Taça de Portugal)		League cup (Note: Includes J.League Cup, UAE League Cup, Taça da Liga)		Continental		Other		Total	
Club	Season	Division	Apps	Goals	Apps	Goals	Apps	Goals	Apps	Goals	Apps	Goals	Apps	Goals
Kashima Antlers	2014	J1 League	30	8	1	1	6	0	—		—		37	9
Kashima Antlers	2015	J1 League	32	10	0	0	4	2	6 (Note: Appearances in AFC Champions League)	0	—		42	12
Kashima Antlers	2016	J1 League	16	5	0	0	5	1	—		—		21	6
Kashima Antlers	Total		78	23	1	1	15	3	6	0	—		100	27
Al Ain	2016–17	UAE Pro League	24	12	2	0	5	1	6	2	—		37	15
Al Ain	2017–18	UAE Pro League	19	5	3	3	5	4	10	3	—		38	15
Al Ain	2018–19	UAE Pro League	22	7	1	1	6	7	7	1	5 (Note: One appearance and one goal in UAE Super Cup, four appearances and one goal in FIFA Club World Cup)	2	41	18
Al Ain	2019–20	UAE Pro League	—		—		—		3	0	—		3	0
Al Ain	Total		65	24	6	4	16	12	26	6	5	2	118	48
Benfica	2019–20	Primeira Liga	4	1	2	0	2	0	3 (Note: Appearances in UEFA Champions League)	0	0	0	11	1
Sharjah	2019–20	UAE Pro League	26	2	2	1	0	0	6	2	—		34	5
Sharjah	2020–21	UAE Pro League	21	6	3	1	2	0	5	1	—		31	8
Sharjah	2021–22	UAE Pro League	20	14	5	3	4	1	7	2	1 (Note: Appearance in UAE Super Cup)	0	37	20
Sharjah	2022–23	UAE Pro League	22	9	4	2	4	1	—		1	0	31	12
Sharjah	2023–24	UAE Pro League	22	11	2	1	2	0	8	2	1	0	35	14
Sharjah	2024–25	UAE Pro League	23	12	4	4	3	4	12 (Note: Appearances in AFC Champions League Two)	5	0	0	42	25
Sharjah	Total		134	54	20	12	15	6	38	12	3	0	210	84
Career total			281	102	29	17	48	21	73	18	8	2	439	160

=== International ===
As of match played 18 December 2025

Appearances and goals by national team and year
National team	Year	Apps	Goals
United Arab Emirates	2025	12	3
Total		12	3

As of match played 18 December 2025
United Arab Emirates score listed first, score column indicates score after each Caio Lucas goal

List of international goals scored by Caio Lucas
No.	Date	Venue	Cap	Opponent	Score	Result	Competition
1	11 October 2025	Jassim bin Hamad Stadium, Al Rayyan, Qatar	4	Oman	2–1	2–1	2026 FIFA World Cup qualification
2	18 November 2025	Basra International Stadium, Basra, Iraq	7	Iraq	1–0	1–2	2026 FIFA World Cup qualification
3	6 December 2025	Lusail Stadium, Lusail, Qatar	9	Egypt	1–0	1–1	2025 FIFA Arab Cup

== Honours ==
Kashima Antlers

- J1 League: 2016
- J.League Cup: 2015

Al Ain

- UAE Pro League: 2017–18
- UAE President's Cup: 2017–18
- FIFA Club World Cup runner-up: 2018

Sharjah

- UAE President's Cup: 2021–22, 2022–23
- UAE League Cup: 2022–23
- UAE Super Cup: 2022, 2025
- AFC Champions League Two: 2024–25
- Qatar-UAE Super Cup: 2026

Individual

- J.League Rookie of the Year: 2014
- FIFA Club World Cup Silver Ball: 2018
- AFC Champions League Two Most Valuable Player: 2024–25
