= Shahin Abdulrahman =

Emirati footballer (born 1992)

Personal information
- Full name: Shahin Abdalla Abdulrahman S. Al-Maazmi
- Date of birth: 16 November 1992 (age 33)
- Place of birth: United Arab Emirates
- Height: 1.80 m (5 ft 11 in)
- Position: Center back

Team information
- Current team: Sharjah
- Number: 4

Youth career
- Sharjah

Senior career*
Years	Team	Apps	(Gls)
2011–	Sharjah	176	(7)

International career
2014–	UAE	15	(0)
- * Club domestic league appearances and goals

Shahin Abdalla Abdulrahman S. Al-Maazmi (Arabic: شاهين عبد الرحمن; born 16 November 1992) is an Emirati footballer. He currently plays as a Center back for Sharjah.

== Honours ==
Sharjah

- UAE Pro League: 2018–19
- UAE President's Cup: 2021–22, 2022–23
- UAE League Cup: 2022–23
- UAE Super Cup: 2019, 2022, 2025
- AFC Champions League Two: 2024–25
- Qatar-UAE Super Cup: 2026
