= 2018–19 UAE President's Cup =

Tournament details
- Country: United Arab Emirates
- Dates: 5 October 2018 – 29 April 2019
- Teams: 16 (Knockout round); 22 (Total)

Final positions
- Champions: Shabab Al-Ahli Dubai (1st title)
- Runners-up: Al Dhafra

Tournament statistics
- Matches played: 35
- Goals scored: 114 (3.26 per match)
- Top goal scorer: (Brazil) Adeílson (5 goals)
- All statistics correct as of 29 April 2019.

The 2018–19 UAE President's Cup was the 43rd edition of the UAE President's Cup, a football cup competition of the United Arab Emirates. The winner qualified for the 2020 AFC Champions League.

== Preliminary round ==
In the preliminary round, ten teams were divided into two groups of five.

=== Group A ===
Team	Pld	W	D	L	GF	GA	GD	Pts
Dibba Al Hisn	4	3	0	1	7	3	+4	9
Al Hamriyah	4	2	1	1	10	8	+2	7
Masafi	4	2	0	2	4	5	−1	6
Khor Fakkan	4	1	1	2	6	8	−2	4
Al Arabi	4	1	0	3	4	7	−3	3

Source: GSA

=== Group B ===
Team	Pld	W	D	L	GF	GA	GD	Pts
Hatta	4	2	2	0	6	3	+3	8
Al Urooba	4	2	1	1	10	6	+4	7
Masfut	4	1	2	1	5	3	+2	5
Al Taawon	4	1	1	2	4	10	−6	4
Al Thaid	4	0	2	2	3	6	−3	2

Source: GSA

== Bracket ==
As per UAE Football Association matches database:

Round of 16
Dibba Al Fujairah	6
Al Wahda	0
Al Dhafra	2
Dibba Al Hisn	1
Sharjah	1
Al Jazira	0
Hatta	1
Emirates	4
Fujairah	1
Ajman	0
Al Wasl	5
Al Ain	3
Shabab Al-Ahli Dubai	3
Kalba	0
Baniyas	0
Al Nasr	1

Quarter-finals
Dibba Al Fujairah	0
Al Dhafra	2
Sharjah	2
Emirates	1
Fujairah	0
Al Wasl	2
Shabab Al-Ahli Dubai	1 (4)
Al Nasr	1 (2)

Semi-finals
Al Dhafra	2
Sharjah	1
Al Wasl	1
Shabab Al-Ahli Dubai	5

Final
Al Dhafra	1
Shabab Al-Ahli Dubai	2

== Round of 16 ==
7 December 2018	Al Ain	3–5	Al Wasl	Abu Dhabi
15:45	Caio 47'; Hussein 57'; Diaky 76'		Lima 21', 63'; Jassem 29'; Caio 44', 83' (pen.)	Stadium: Al Nahyan Stadium

7 December 2018	Dibba Al-Fujairah	6–0	Al Wahda	Dubai
18:30	Abbas 8' (o.g.); Juma 51', 90+3'; Fettouhi 67', 77'; Jabrane 81' (pen.)			Stadium: Maktoum bin Rashid Al Maktoum Stadium

8 December 2018	Sharjah	1–0	Al Jazira	Dubai
16:40	Welliton 66'			Stadium: Zabeel Stadium

8 December 2018	Al Dhafra	2–1	Dibba Al-Hisn	Abu Dhabi
16:45	? 10' ? 63'		? 90+4'	Stadium: Baniyas Stadium

8 December 2018	Fujairah	1–0	Ajman	Ras Al Khaimah
18:30	? 76' (o.g.)			Stadium: Emirates Club Stadium

8 December 2018	Hatta	1–4	Emirates	Kalba
18:30	Santos 46'		Diabaté 27', 29', 83', 90+6'	Stadium: Ittihad Kalba Stadium

9 December 2018	Shabab Al-Ahli Dubai	3–0	Kalba	Ajman
	Ayoví 25'; Silva 60'; Vecchio 90'			Stadium: Ajman Stadium

9 December 2018	Baniyas	0–1	Al Nasr	Sharjah
			Gabriel 24'	Stadium: Sharjah Stadium

== Quarter-finals ==
8 February 2019	Dibba Al-Fujairah	0–2	Al Dhafra	Dubai
17:20			Rômulo 10' Ba Wazir 90+6'	Stadium: Al Maktoum Stadium

8 February 2019	Fujairah	0–2	Al Wasl	Ras Al Khaimah
20:00			Caio 32' Ali Saleh 56'	Stadium: Emirates Club Stadium

9 February 2019	Sharjah	2–1 (a.e.t.)	Emirates	Fujairah
17:20	Ryan Mendes 11', 103'		Hossam Lotfi 90+4'	Stadium: Fujairah Club Stadium

9 February 2019	Shabab Al-Ahli Dubai	1–1 (a.e.t.) (4–2 p)	Al Nasr	Dubai
20:00	Luvannor 89'		Al Akbari 79'	Stadium: Zabeel Stadium

== Semi-finals ==
16 March 2019	Al Dhafra	2–1	Sharjah	Madinat Zayed
17:45	Diego 64' Rômulo 80'		Mendes 89'	Stadium: Al Dhafra Stadium

16 March 2019	Al Wasl	1–5	Shabab Al Ahli	Dubai
20:45	Caio 23' (pen.)		Abbas 45+3' Luvannor 54' Díaz 65' Hassan 81' Ayoví 89'	Stadium: Zabeel Stadium

== Final ==
29 April 2019	Al Dhafra	1–2	Shabab Al Ahli	Abu Dhabi
19:00	Atouchi 81'		Khalil 35', 70'	Stadium: Zayed Sports City Stadium; Referee: Hamad Ali Yousuf Al-Ali

Al Dhafra	Shabab Al Ahli
