= Abdullah Al-Tamimi =

Emirati footballer (born 1993)

Personal information
- Full name: Abdullah Mohammed Ismail Abdulghafor Al-Tamimi
- Date of birth: 2 March 1993 (age 33)
- Place of birth: United Arab Emirates
- Height: 1.79 m (5 ft 10 1/2 in)
- Position: Goalkeeper

Team information
- Current team: Al Nasr
- Number: 40

Youth career
- Al Nasr

Senior career*
Years	Team	Apps	(Gls)
2012–2018	Al Nasr	16	(0)
2018–2021	Al-Fujairah	53	(0)
2021–	Al Nasr	0	(0)
- * Club domestic league appearances and goals

Abdullah Al-Tamimi (Arabic:عبدالله التميمي) (born 2 March 1993) is an Emirati footballer. He currently plays for Al Nasr as a goalkeeper .
