= Al Nahyan, Abu Dhabi =

Neighbourhood in Abu Dhabi, UAE

Coordinates: 24°28′N 54°23′E

Al Nahyan is a neighbourhood in Abu Dhabi, United Arab Emirates.

Al Nahyan is named after the Al Nahyan family. It is the location of the Al Nahyan Stadium, which is also named after them.
