= 2021–22 UAE President's Cup =

Tournament details
- Country: United Arab Emirates
- Dates: 10 September 2021 – 21 October 2022
- Teams: 16 (Knockout round); 30 (Total)

Final positions
- Champions: Sharjah (9th title)
- Runners-up: Al Wahda

Tournament statistics
- Matches played: 13
- Goals scored: 24 (1.85 per match)
- Top goal scorer(s): Ahmed Abunamous; Fábio Lima; Gilberto (2 goals each)

The 2021–22 UAE President's Cup was the 45th edition of the UAE President's Cup, Shabab Al Ahli were the defending champions after winning the last season's President's Cup, but were knocked out in the quarter-finals by eventual champions Sharjah.

== Participating clubs ==
Round	Clubs	Winners from previous round	New entries this round	Leagues entering
Preliminary round	16	0	16	16 UAE First Division League teams
Preliminary round play-offs	4	4	0	
Round of 16	16	2	14	14 UAE Pro League teams
Quarter-finals	8	8	0	
Semi-finals	4	4	0	
Final	2	2	0	

=== Draw dates ===
Round	Draw date	Draw venue	Reference
Preliminary round	31 August 2021	Dubai	
Round of 16	14 November 2021	Dubai	
Quarter-finals	28 December 2021	Abu Dhabi	
Semi-finals	18 January 2022	Dubai	

== Preliminary round ==
The preliminary round is contested between the 16 teams in the UAE First Division League, divided into four groups of four, the winners of each group will advance into a play off round.

=== Group stage ===
==== Group A ====
Pos	Team	Pld	W	D	L	GF	GA	GD	Pts	Qualification
1	Al Bataeh	3	2	1	0	8	0	+8	7	Qualification for the playoffs
2	Al Taawon	3	2	1	0	4	0	+4	7	
3	Masafi	3	1	0	2	2	4	−2	3	
4	Dubai City	3	0	0	3	0	10	−10	0	

Updated to match(es) played on 25 September 2021. Source: Global sports archive

11 September 2021	Al Taawon	3–0; Awarded	Dubai City	Al Jeer
17:35	Paraíba 43', 90+6'; Al-Shehhi 58'	Report	Ebrahim 48'	Stadium: Taawon Stadium

11 September 2021	Al Bataeh	3–0; Awarded	Masafi	Al Bataeh
17:40	Augusto 5'; Jalal 41'	Report	Santos 45', 53'	Stadium: Al Bataeh Stadium

17 September 2021	Al Taawon	1–0	Masafi	Al Jeer
17:35	Paraíba 54'	Report		Stadium: Taawon Stadium

17 September 2021	Al Bataeh	5–0	Dubai City	Al Bataeh
17:35	Souza 30', 35'; Gharib 37', 60'; Jalal 65' (pen.)	Report		Stadium: Al Bataeh Stadium

25 September 2021	Al Bataeh	0–0	Al Taawon	Al Bataeh
17:25		Report		Stadium: Al Bataeh Stadium

25 September 2021	Masafi	2–0	Dubai City	Masafi
17:25	Fidélis 25'; Diakite 63'	Report		Stadium: Masafi Stadium

==== Group B ====
Pos	Team	Pld	W	D	L	GF	GA	GD	Pts	Qualification
1	Dibba Al Fujairah	3	3	0	0	12	0	+12	9	Qualification for the playoffs
2	Al Hamriyah	3	2	0	1	4	3	+1	6	
3	Abtal Al Khaleej	3	1	0	2	8	8	0	3	
4	Al Jazirah Al Hamra	3	0	0	3	3	16	−13	0	

Updated to match(es) played on 24 September 2021. Source: Global sports archive

10 September 2021	Dibba Al Fujairah	7–0	Al Jazirah Al Hamra	Dibba Al-Fujairah
17:35	Acosta 44', 48', 51', 58'; Rahma 59' (o.g.); Chiquinho 68'; Bilal 73'	Report		Stadium: Dibba (Fujairah) Stadium

10 September 2021	Al Hamriyah	2–1	Abtal Al Khaleej	Al Hamriyah
17:40	Gilmar 28'; Khalil 47'	Report	Wesley 1'	Stadium: Al Hamriya Sports Club Stadium

18 September 2021	Al Hamriyah	2–1	Al Jazirah Al Hamra	Al Hamriyah
17:30	Gilmar 50'; Sulaiman 55'	Report	Al Dosari 86'	Stadium: Al Hamriya Sports Club Stadium

18 September 2021	Abtal Al Khaleej	0–4	Dibba Al Fujairah	Al Lisaili
17:35		Report	Acosta 41', 85', 90+4'; Chiquinho 90+2'	Stadium: The Sevens Stadium

24 September 2021	Al Jazirah Al Hamra	2–7	Abtal Al Khaleej	Al Jazira Al Hamra
17:20	Hassan 43', 90+2'	Report	Abibou 10'; Adigun 20', 33'; Wesley 64', 82', 89'; Salmeen 81'	Stadium: Al Hamra Stadium

24 September 2021	Dibba Al Fujairah	1–0	Al Hamriyah	Dibba Al-Fujairah
17:20	Pape 27'	Report		Stadium: Dibba (Fujairah) Stadium

==== Group C ====
Pos	Team	Pld	W	D	L	GF	GA	GD	Pts	Qualification
1	Hatta	3	2	1	0	7	3	+4	7	Qualification for the playoffs
2	Dibba Al Hisn	3	2	0	1	9	5	+4	6	
3	Al Rams	3	1	1	1	3	5	−2	4	
4	Masfout	3	0	0	3	3	9	−6	0	

Updated to match(es) played on 25 September 2021. Source: Global sports archive

11 September 2021	Dibba Al Hisn	4–1	Al Rams	Dibba Al-Hisn
17:35	Al-Yahyaei 25'; Al-Marbuii 34'; Souza 45'; Ali 82'	Report	Ibrahim 72'	Stadium: Dibba (Al Hisn) Stadium

11 September 2021	Hatta	3–2	Masfout	Hatta
17:40	Eid 37'; Al-Hammadi 38'; Mubarak 58'	Report	Bartoli 85'; Dybal 90+4'	Stadium: Hamdan Bin Rashid Stadium

17 September 2021	Al Rams	0–0	Hatta	Ar-Rams
17:30		Report		Stadium: Al Rams Stadium

17 September 2021	Dibba Al Hisn	4–0	Masfout	Dibba Al-Hisn
17:30	Dedê 2'; Al-Marbuii 16', 55'; Al-Sereidi 17'	Report		Stadium: Dibba (Al Hisn) Stadium

25 September 2021	Masfout	1–2	Al Rams	Masfout
17:25	Al Jamhi 65'	Report	Lima 59', 90+3'	Stadium: Masfout Club Stadium

25 September 2021	Hatta	4–1	Dibba Al Hisn	Hatta
17:25	Costa 1', 44'; Regis Tosatti 68'; Mubarak 84'	Report	Al-Marbuii 68'	Stadium: Hamdan Bin Rashid Stadium

==== Group D ====
Pos	Team	Pld	W	D	L	GF	GA	GD	Pts	Qualification
1	Al Arabi	2	2	0	0	6	0	+6	6	Qualification for the playoffs
2	Al Dhaid	2	1	0	1	1	3	−2	3	
3	Fujairah	2	0	0	2	0	4	−4	0	
4	Ras Al Khaimah	0	0	0	0	0	0	0	0	Withdrew

Updated to match(es) played on 18 September 2021. Source: Global sports archive

10 September 2021	Fujairah	0–1	Al Dhaid	Fujairah
17:35		Report	Tarik 86'	Stadium: Fujairah Club Stadium

18 September 2021	Al Arabi	3–0	Al Dhaid	Umm Al Quwain
17:30	Medeiros 55'; Silva 64'; Eisa 84'	Report		Stadium: Umm al Quwain Stadium

24 September 2021	Fujairah	0–3	Al Arabi	Fujairah
17:20		Report	Jalal 44'; Alex 68'; Walisson 90+5'	Stadium: Fujairah Club Stadium

=== Play off round ===
1 October 2021	Al Bataeh	0–0 (6–7 p)	Hatta	Al Bataeh
17:15		Report		Stadium: Al Bataeh Stadium

1 October 2021	Dibba Al Fujairah	1–2	Al Arabi	Dibba Al-Fujairah
17:15	Acosta 56'	Report	Alex 16'; Jalal 47'	Stadium: Dibba (F) Stadium

== Knockout stage ==
=== Bracket ===
Round of 16
Kalba	2
Al Arabi	1
Emirates	0
Baniyas	3
Al Jazira	1
Al Urooba	0
Al Wahda (a.e.t.)	1
Ajman	0
Khor Fakkan	0
Al Wasl	3
Al Nasr	0
Al Ain	1
Sharjah	2
Hatta	1
Al Dhafra	0
Shabab Al Ahli	1

Quarter-finals
Kalba	0
Baniyas	2
Al Jazira	1
Al Wahda	2
Al Wasl	2
Al Ain	1
Sharjah	0 (4)
Shabab Al Ahli	0 (2)

Semi-finals
Baniyas	1	2	3
Al Wahda	4	2	6
Al Wasl	0	2	2
Sharjah	0	3	3

Final
Al Wahda	0
Sharjah	1

=== Round of 16 ===
All times are local (UTC+04:00)

20 December 2021	Emirates	0–3	Baniyas	Ras Al Khaimah
16:45		Report	Abunamous 46', 57'; Al-Hammadi 87'	Stadium: Emirates Club Stadium

21 December 2021	Khor Fakkan	0–3	Al Wasl	Khor Fakkan
16:45		Report	Pottker 50'; Lima 73', 85' (pen.)	Stadium: Saqr bin Mohammad al Qassimi Stadium

21 December 2021	Al Jazira	1–0	Al Urooba	Al Nahyan, Abu Dhabi
19:50	Al Ameri 5'	Report		Stadium: Mohammad Bin Zayed Stadium

21 December 2021	Al Wahda	1–0 (a.e.t.)	Ajman	Al Nahyan, Abu Dhabi
19:45	Pimenta 115'	Report		Stadium: Al Nahyan Stadium

21 December 2021	Al Nasr	0–1	Al Ain	Al Nasr, Dubai
19:50		Report	Pereira 81'	Stadium: Al-Maktoum Stadium

22 December 2021	Kalba	2–1	Al Arabi	Kalba
16:45	Camara 9'; Mohammed 22'	Report	Henrique 56'	Stadium: Ittihad Kalba Stadium

22 December 2021	Al Dhafra	0–1	Shabab Al Ahli	Madinat Zayed
16:50		Report	Al-Kamali 20' (pen.)	Stadium: Al Dhafra Stadium

22 December 2021	Sharjah	2–1	Hatta	Sharjah
19:45	Bernard 10'; Caio 30'	Report	Régis	Stadium: Sharjah Stadium

=== Quarter-finals ===
15 January 2022	Al Wasl	2–1	Al Ain	Zabeel, Dubai
17:05	Gilberto 60', 90+1'	Report	Laba 45+2'	Stadium: Zabeel Stadium

15 January 2022	Al Jazira	1–2	Al Wahda	Al Rawdah, Abu Dhabi
20:00	Victor 32'	Report	Kharbin 85'; Silva 89'	Stadium: Zayed Sports City Stadium

16 January 2022	Kalba	0–2	Baniyas	Kalba
17:00		Report	Ivković 58'; Giménez 68'	Stadium: Ittihad Kalba Stadium

16 January 2022	Sharjah	0–0 (a.e.t.) (4–2 p)	Shabab Al Ahli	Sharjah
20:00		Report		Stadium: Sharjah Stadium
	Penalties
	Shukurov (penalty scored); Ba Wazir (penalty scored); Bernard (penalty scored); Meloni (penalty scored)		(penalty scored) Ganiev; (penalty missed) Nourollahi; (penalty scored) Jumaa; (penalty missed) Jaber

=== Semi-finals ===
==== First leg ====
14 February 2022	Al Wasl	0–0	Sharjah	Zabeel, Dubai
17:25		Report		Stadium: Zabeel Stadium

14 February 2022	Al Wahda	4–1	Baniyas	Al Nahyan, Abu Dhabi
20:00	Kharbin 40'; Matar 59'; Pedro 75' (pen.), 81'	Report	Giménez 45+1'	Stadium: Al Nahyan Stadium

==== Second leg ====
22 February 2022	Sharjah	3–2 (3–2 agg.)	Al Wasl	Sharjah
20:30	Camara 77'; Caio 89', 90+2'	Report	Gilberto 52' (pen.); Saleh 57'	Stadium: Sharjah Stadium

22 February 2022	Baniyas	2–2 (3–6 agg.)	Al Wahda	Al Shamkha, Abu Dhabi
20:00	Al-Hammadi 15'; Al-Noubi 27'	Report	Esmaeel 11'; Pedro 16'	Stadium: Baniyas Stadium

=== Final ===
21 October 2022	Al Wahda	0–1	Sharjah	Al Ain
19:45		Report	Alcacer 52'	Stadium: Hazza bin Zayed Stadium; Referee: Matt Conger (New Zealand)

== Top scorers ==
As of 21 October 2022

Rank	Player	Club	Goals
1	(Palestine) Ahmed Abunamous	Baniyas	2
1	(Argentina) Nicolás Giménez	Baniyas	2
1	(Brazil) Gilberto	Al Wasl	2
1	(United Arab Emirates) Fábio Lima	Al Wasl	2
1	(Brazil) João Pedro	Al Wahda	2
1	(Syria) Omar Kharbin	Al Wahda	2
2	18 Players		1

- Note: Goals scored in the preliminary round are not included.
