= Sharjah FC =

Emirati professional football club

Sharjah
- Full name: Sharjah Football Club
- Nickname: The King (supporters)
- Short name: Sharjah FC
- Founded: 1966; 60 years ago
- Ground: Sharjah Stadium
- Capacity: 16,899
- Owner: Sultan bin Muhammad Al-Qasimi
- Chairman: Mohamed Binhindi
- Head coach: José Morais
- League: UAE Pro League
- 2025–26: UAE Pro League, 8th of 14
- Website: sharjahclub.ae/en/
Home colours	Away colours

Sharjah Football Club (Arabic: نادي الشارقة لكرة القدم) is an Emirati professional football club that competes in the UAE Pro League based in the city of Sharjah in the Emirate of Sharjah, the United Arab Emirates. Their home stadium is the Sharjah Stadium.

Founded in 1966, Sharjah is considered one of the pioneers of UAE football since its inception. Achieving success through the years has made Sharjah one of the most prestigious clubs in the country. Sharjah FC is also the most successful team in the Emirate of Sharjah, winning 6 Pro League titles, 10 Presidents Cups, 1 League Cup, 3 Super Cups, and 1 AFC Champions League Two title. The club was also the first official UAE league champion since its establishment in 1974.

== History ==
=== Golden age ===
Sharjah was founded in 1966 under the name of Al Oruba Club, they were the first official champions of the UAE League winning it in 1974 after beating Al Ahli and Oman. The club would merge with Al Khaleej in 1974 to form Al Sharjah SCC and relocate their headquarters in Sharjah City. The club would later see itself win the league in 4 more occasions during the 80s and 90s and 8 out of the 22 players in the UAE's 1990 squad were players from Sharjah, more than any other club at the time.

=== Decline ===
During the mid-2000s however, Sharjah would see a decline as they would finish in mid-table consecutively and in 2012, the club got relegated for the first time in their history. However, the club were quickly promoted back to the top tier division in 2013.

=== New era ===
Sharjah won their first title since 1996 in 2019 with a record of only one loss. On 14 September 2019, Sharjah won their first UAE Super Cup title since 1994 after beating Shabab Al Ahli in penalties 4–3. The club went on to win the UAE League Cup in the 2022–23 season for the first time in the clubs history, the club also won two more UAE President's Cups back to back after reaching the final in 2022 and 2023 beating Al Wahda 1–0 and Al Ain 14–13 on penalties, making Sharjah FC the champions a record of 10 times, In the 2024–25 seasons the club ended up winning their first ever continental title which was the AFC Champions League 2 only losing two games, and becoming the second ever UAE club to win a continental trophy.

== Honours ==
=== Domestic ===
==== Leagues ====
- UAE League
  - Winners (6): 1973–74, 1986–87, 1988–89, 1993–94, 1995–96, 2018–19
- UAE Division One
  - Winners (1): 1992–93

==== Cups ====
- UAE President's Cup
  - Winners (10): 1978–79, 1979–80, 1981–82, 1982–83, 1990–91, 1994–95, 1997–98, 2002–03, 2021–22, 2022–23
- UAE League Cup
  - Winners (1): 2022–23
- UAE Super Cup
  - Winners (4): 1994, 2019, 2022, 2025
- Joint League Cup
  - Winners (1): 1977

=== Regional ===
- GCC Champions League
  - Winners (1): 1991
- Qatar–UAE Super Cup
  - Winners (1): 2026

=== Continental ===
- AFC Cup / AFC Champions League Two
  - Winners (1): 2024–25

== Season-by-season record ==
Season	Lvl.	Tms.	Pos.	President's Cup	League Cup
2008–09	1	12	10th	Quarter-Finals	First Round
2009–10	1	12	6th	Round of 16	First Round
2010–11	1	12	7th	Preliminary Round	First Round
2011–12	1	12	12th	Semi-Finals	First Round
2012–13	2	14	2nd	Quarter-Finals	—
2013–14	1	14	7th	Round of 16	Semi-Finals
2014–15	1	14	12th	Round of 16	Runner-ups
2015–16	1	14	11th	Quarter-Finals	First Round
2016–17	1	14	9th	Semi-Finals	First Round
2017–18	1	12	6th	Quarter-Finals	First Round
2018–19	1	14	1st	Semi-Finals	First Round
2019–20^{a}	1	14	4th	Semi-Finals	Quarter-Finals
2020–21	1	14	4th	Semi-Finals	Quarter-Finals
2021–22	1	14	2nd	Champions	First Round
2022–23	1	14	7th	Champions	Champions
2023–24	1	14	4th	Quarter-Finals	Quarter-Finals
2024–25	1	14	2nd	Runner-ups	

_{Notes 2019–20 UAE football season was cancelled due to the COVID-19 pandemic in the United Arab Emirates.}

== Club officials ==
Position	Staff
Head Coach	(Portugal) José Morais
Assistant Coach	(Portugal) David Ribeiro (Serbia) Vladan Perasevic (United Arab Emirates) Abdulmajid Al Nimer
Goalkeeper Coach	(Montenegro) Boban Bajković
Technical Staff	(United Arab Emirates) Abdulrahman Al-Haddad
Fitness Trainer	(Serbia) Milan Dimitric
Rehab Trainer	(Brazil) Leandro Aiub
Conditioning coach	(Brazil) Helder Fernandes Soares
Analyst	(Brazil) Eduardo Thomaz

== Players ==
As of UAE Pro-League:

Note: Flags indicate national team as defined under FIFA eligibility rules; some limited exceptions apply. Players may hold more than one non-FIFA nationality.

No.	Pos.	Nation	Player
1	GK	UAE	Khaled Tawhid
3	DF	UAE	Al Hassan Saleh
4	DF	UAE	Shahin Abdulrahman
5	DF	CRO	Maro Katinić
6	MF	COD	Charles Pickel
7	FW	UAE	Caio Lucas
8	MF	BRA	Agner
9	FW	TOG	Kodjo Fo-Doh Laba
10	MF	ITA	Igor Coronado
11	MF	UAE	Luanzinho
17	GK	UAE	Mayed Mohsen
18	DF	UAE	Abdullah Ghanem
19	DF	UAE	Khaled Ibrahim
20	FW	BRA	Julimar
21	FW	UAE	Mayed Al-Kass
23	DF	CPV	Diney
24	MF	UAE	Majid Rashid
26	GK	UAE	Darwish Bin Habib

No.	Pos.	Nation	Player
30	FW	UAE	Ousmane Camara
33	DF	SRB	Vladimir Prijović
34	MF	UAE	Harib Abdalla
40	GK	UAE	Adel Al-Hosani (captain)
60	MF	IRI	Arshia Sarshogh
66	DF	BRA	Leandrinho
70	FW	UAE	Badr Al-Sowaidi
71	DF	UAE	Ali Taher
74	MF	BRA	Léo Azevedo
76	MF	UAE	Khalifa Sembaij
80	MF	UAE	Dhari Fahad
88	MF	UAE	Majed Hassan
90	FW	BRA	Carlos André
98	FW	MLI	Cheickna Doumbia
99	FW	UAE	Sultan Al-Saadi

=== Out on loan ===
Note: Flags indicate national team as defined under FIFA eligibility rules; some limited exceptions apply. Players may hold more than one non-FIFA nationality.

No.	Pos.	Nation	Player
27	MF	BRA	Guilherme Biro (on loan to Kalba)
32	MF	SWE	Harun Ibrahim (on loan to Häcken)

No.	Pos.	Nation	Player
—	MF	UAE	Majed Suroor (on loan to United)

== Performance in AFC competitions ==
=== AFC Champions League history ===
- AFC Champions League: 6 appearances

2004: Quarter Finals
2009: Withdrew
2020: Group Stage
2021: Round of 16
2022: Group Stage
2023–24: Group Stage

Season	Round	Club	Home	Away	Aggregate
2004	Group C	(Iraq) Al-Shorta	2–0	3–2	1st
2004	Group C	(Saudi Arabia) Al-Hilal	5–2	0–0	1st
2004	Group C	(Bahrain) Al-Ahli	3–0	3–0	1st
2004	Quarter-finals	(South Korea) Seongnam	2–5	0–6	2–11
2020	Group C	(Saudi Arabia) Al Taawoun	0–1	6–0	4th
2020	Group C	(Iran) Persepolis	2–2	0–4	4th
2020	Group C	(Qatar) Al-Duhail	4–2	1–2	4th
2021	Group B	(Iraq) Al-Quwa Al-Jawiya	1–0	3–2	1st
2021	Group B	(Iran) Tractor	0–2	0–0	1st
2021	Group B	(Uzbekistan) Pakhtakor	4–1	1–1	1st
2021	Round of 16	(United Arab Emirates) Al Wahda	1–1 (p) (4–5)		
2022	Playoffs	(Iraq) Al-Zawraa	1–1 (p) (6–5)		
2022	Group A	(Saudi Arabia) Al-Hilal	2–2	1–2	3rd
2022	Group A	(Qatar) Al-Rayyan	1–1	1–3	3rd
2022	Group A	(Tajikistan) Istiklol	2–1	0–2	3rd
2023–24	Preliminary round	(Bangladesh) Bashundhara Kings	2–0		
2023–24	Play-off	(Iran) Tractor	3–1		
2023–24	Group B	(Qatar) Al-Sadd	0–2	0–0	3rd
2023–24	Group B	(Jordan) Al-Faisaly	1–0	1–2	3rd
2023–24	Group B	(Uzbekistan) Nasaf	1–0	1–1	3rd

=== AFC Champions League Two history ===
- AFC Champions League Two: 1 appearance

2024–25: Champions

Season	Round	Club	Home	Away	Aggregate
2024–25	Group C	(Jordan) Al Wehdat	2–2	3–1	1st
2024–25	Group C	(Iran) Sepahan	3–1	1–3	1st
2024–25	Group C	(Tajikistan) Istiklol	3–1	1–0	1st
2024–25	Round of 16	(Jordan) Al Hussein	1–0	0–1	1–1 (3–0 p)
2024–25	Quarter-finals	(United Arab Emirates) Shabab Al Ahli	1–1	1–1	2–2 (5–4 p)
2024–25	Semi-finals	(Saudi Arabia) Al Taawoun	2–0	0–1	2–1
2024–25	Final	(Singapore) Lion City Sailors	2–1		

=== Asian Club Championship history ===
- Asian Club Championship: 2 appearances

1989: Group Stage
1994: First Round

Season	Round	Club	Home	Away	Aggregate
1989	Group 2	(Saudi Arabia) Al-Ettifaq	0–1		3rd
1989	Group 2	(Bahrain) West Riffa	2–0		3rd
1989	Group 2	(Kuwait) Kazma	0–3		3rd
1989	Group 2	(Oman) Fanja	4–1		3rd
1994	First Round	(Bahrain) Al-Muharraq	1–1	1–2	2–3

=== Record by country ===
As of 18 May 2025

Country	Pld	W	D	L	GF	GA	GD	Win%
Bahrain	5	3	1	1	10	3	+7	60.00
Bangladesh	1	1	0	0	2	0	+2	100.00
Iran	7	2	2	3	9	13	−4	28.57
Iraq	5	4	1	0	10	5	+5	80.00
Jordan	6	3	1	2	8	6	+2	50.00
Kuwait	1	0	0	1	0	3	−3	0.00
Oman	1	1	0	0	4	1	+3	100.00
Qatar	6	1	2	3	7	10	−3	16.67
Saudi Arabia	9	3	2	4	16	9	+7	33.33
Singapore	1	1	0	0	2	1	+1	100.00
South Korea	2	0	0	2	2	11	−9	0.00
Tajikistan	4	3	0	1	6	4	+2	75.00
United Arab Emirates	3	0	3	0	3	3	+0	0.00
Uzbekistan	4	2	2	0	7	3	+4	50.00

== Managerial history ==
Name	Nat.	From	To	Ref.
Faouzi Benzarti	(Tunisia)	January 2001	2001	
Dragan Gugleta	(Federal Republic of Yugoslavia)	December 2001	2002	
Pavle Dolezar	(France)	July 2002	October 2002	
Pedro Rosello	(Spain)	October 2002	November 2002	
Juma Rabea	(United Arab Emirates)	November 2002	June 2004	
Youssef Zouaoui	(Tunisia)	June 2004	2005	
Henri Stambouli	(France)	2005	January 2006	
Wajdi Essid	(Tunisia)	January 2006	February 2006	
Rainer Zobel	(Germany)	February 2006	2006	
Srećko Juričić	(Croatia)	June 2006	October 2006	
Renê Weber	(Brazil)	October 2006	May 2007	
Juma Rabea	(United Arab Emirates)	May 2007	May 2007	
Gerard van der Lem	(Netherlands)	July 2007	March 2008	
Wajdi Essid	(Tunisia)	March 2008	2008	
Youssef Zouaoui	(Tunisia)	June 2008	February 2009	
Manuel Cajuda	(Portugal)	July 2009	May 2011	
Abdulmajeed Al Nimr	(United Arab Emirates)	May 2011	2011	
Carlos Azenha	(Portugal)	June 2011	September 2011	
Valeriu Tița	(Romania)	September 2011	December 2011	
Jorvan Vieira	(Brazil)	December 2011	February 2012	
Valeriu Tița	(Romania)	February 2012	April 2012	
Abdulmajeed Al Nimr	(United Arab Emirates)	April 2012	June 2012	
Faouzi Benzarti	(Tunisia)	June 2012	November 2012	
Ayman El Ramadi	(Egypt)	November 2012	2013	
Paulo Bonamigo	(Brazil)	June 2013	November 2015	
Abdulaziz Al Anbari	(United Arab Emirates)	November 2015	2016	
Georgios Donis	(Greece)	July 2016	January 2017	
José Peseiro	(Portugal)	January 2017	October 2017	
Abdulaziz Al Anbari	(United Arab Emirates)	October 2017	November 2021	
Cosmin Olăroiu	(Romania)	November 2021	May 2025	

== See also ==
- List of football clubs in the United Arab Emirates
