= Ittihad Kalba Stadium =

Stadium in the United Arab Emirates

Coordinates: 25.05992°N 56.34672°E

- Location: Kalba, United Arab Emirates
- Capacity: 7,701
- Opened: 1996; 29 years ago

Tenants
- Kalba FC

Ittihad Kalba Stadium is a multi-purpose stadium located in Kalba, Sharjah, United Arab Emirates, with a capacity of 7,701. Opened in 1996, it is the home stadium of Kalba FC.
