= UAE Super Cup =

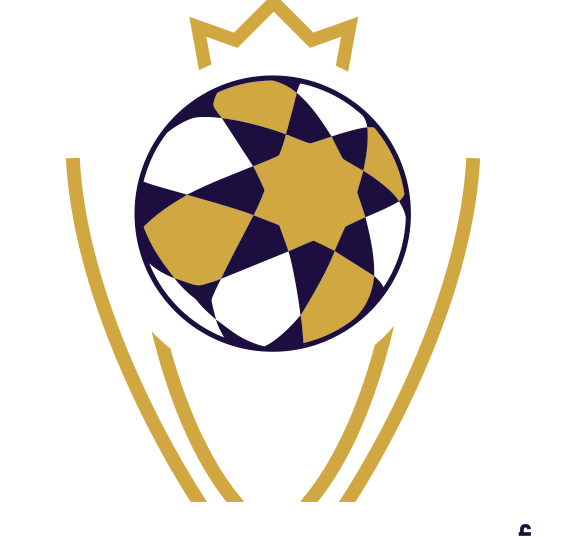
- Founded: 1990; 36 years ago
- Region: United Arab Emirates
- Teams: 2
- Current champions: Sharjah FC (4th title)
- Most championships: Shabab Al Ahli (7 titles)
- Broadcaster(s): Abu Dhabi Sports; Dubai Sports; Sharjah Sports
- Website: uaefa.ae

The UAE Super Cup (Arabic: كأس السوبر الإماراتي) and Charity Champions Cup in the first edition (1989–90), is the curtain raiser of the United Arab Emirates football season. It is played between the previous season's Pro-League winners and President's Cup Winners.

The first edition was played on 14 September 2008.

== History ==
From 2008 to 2021, it was known as the Etisalat Super Cup and Arabian Gulf Super Cup for sponsorship reasons.

== Finals by year ==
Year	Winners	Score		Runners-up
Two-team format (League, President's Cup Winners)
1990	Al Nasr (1988–89 President's Cup)	0–0 (aet) 5–4 (p)		Sharjah (1988–89 Football League)
1991	Not played			
1992	Not played			
1993	Al Shaab (1992–93 President's Cup)	2–1 (aet)		Al Ain (1992–93 Football League)
1994	Sharjah (1993–94 Football League)	2–0		Al Shabab (1993–94 President's Cup)
League system (top-6 of league)
1995	Al Ain	1st	2nd	Sharjah
1996	Al Nasr	1st	2nd	Al Wasl
1997	Not played			
1998	Not played			
1999	Not played			
2000	Not played			
2001	Not played			
Four-team format (Top-4 league)
2002	Al Wahda	1–0		Al Ain
2003	Al Ain	3–1		Al Wahda
2004	Not played			
2005	Not played			
2006	Not played			
2007	Not played			
Two-team format (League, President's Cup Winners)
2008	Al Ahli (2007–08 UAE President's Cup winners)	1–0		Al Shabab (2007–08 UAE Pro League winners)
2009	Al Ain (2008–09 UAE President's Cup winners)	2–2 5–3 (p)		Al Ahli (2008–09 UAE Pro League winners)
2010	Emirates (2009–10 UAE President's Cup winners)	3–1		Al Wahda (2009–10 UAE Pro League winners)
2011	Al Wahda (2010–11 President's Cup runners-up)	2–2 7–6 (p)		Al Jazira (won the Double)
2012	Al Ain (2011–12 UAE Pro League winners)	0–0 5–4 (p)		Al Jazira (2011–12 UAE President's Cup winners)
2013	Al Ahli (2012–13 UAE President's Cup winners)	0–0 3–2 (p)		Al Ain (2012–13 UAE Pro League winners)
2014	Al Ahli (2013–14 UAE Pro League winners)	1–0		Al Ain (2013–14 UAE President's Cup winners)
2015	Al Ain (2014–15 UAE Pro League winners)	4–2		Al Nasr (2014–15 UAE President's Cup winners)
2016	Al Ahli (2015–16 UAE Pro League winners)	2–1		Al Jazira (2015–16 UAE President's Cup winners)
2017	Al Wahda (2016–17 UAE President's Cup winners)	2–0		Al Jazira (2016–17 UAE Pro League winners)
2018	Al Wahda (2017–18 UAE Pro League runners-up)	3–3 4–3 (p)		Al Ain (won the Double)
2019	Sharjah (2018–19 UAE Pro League winners)	0–0 4–3 (p)		Shabab Al Ahli (2018–19 UAE President's Cup winners)
2020^{a}	Shabab Al Ahli (2018-19 UAE President's Cup winners)	1–0		Sharjah (2018-19 UAE Pro League winners)
2021	Al Jazira (2020–21 UAE Pro League winners)	1–1 5–3 (p)		Shabab Al Ahli (2020–21 UAE President's Cup winners)
2022	Sharjah (2021–22 UAE President's Cup winners)	1–0		Al Ain (2021–22 UAE Pro League winners)
2023	Shabab Al Ahli (2022–23 UAE Pro League winners)	6–2		Sharjah (2022–23 UAE President's Cup winners)
2024	Shabab Al-Ahli (2023–24 UAE Pro League Runners-up)	2–2 4–1 (p)		Al Wasl (won the Double)
2025	Sharjah (2024–25 UAE Pro League Runners-up)	3–2		Shabab Al Ahli (won the Double)

_{Notes
1. Due to the cancellation of last year's tournament as a result of the COVID-19 pandemic, the super cup was contested as a repeat between
the participants of last season's league and cup winners, Sharjah and Shabab Al Ahli.}

== Titles by team ==
Team	Winners	Runners-up	Winning years	Runner-up years
Shabab Al Ahli	7	4	2008, 2013, 2014, 2016, 2020, 2023,2024	2009, 2019, 2021, 2025.
Al Ain	5	6	1995, 2003, 2009, 2012, 2015	1993, 2002, 2013, 2014, 2018, 2022
Al Wahda	4	2	2002, 2011, 2017, 2018	2003, 2010
Sharjah	4	4	1994, 2019, 2022, 2025	1990, 1995, 2020, 2023
Al Nasr	2	1	1990, 1996	2015
Al Jazira	1	4	2021	2011, 2012, 2016, 2017
Emirates	1	0	2010	
Al Shaab^{b}	1	0	1993	
Al Shabab	0	2		1994, 2008
Al Wasl	0	2		1996, 2024

_{Notes
1. Al Shabab and Dubai CSC merged into Al-Ahli form Shabab Al Ahli in 2017
2. Al Shaab dissolved in 2017}

== Top scorers ==
=== Top scorers by season ===
Season	Player	Club	Goals
1994–95	(United Arab Emirates) Salem Johar	Al Ain	6
1995–96	(United Arab Emirates) Bakheet Saad	Al Shabab	5
