= 2018–19 UAE Pro League =

UAE Pro-League
- Season: 2018–19
- Champions: Sharjah (6th title)
- Relegated: Emirates; Dibba Al Fujairah
- 2020 AFC Champions League: Sharjah; Shabab Al Ahli; Al Wahda; Al Ain
- 2020 Arab Champions League: Al Jazira; Al Wasl
- Matches: 168
- Goals: 605 (3.6 per match)
- Average goals/game: 3.6
- Top goalscorer: Sebastián Tagliabué (27 goals)
- Biggest home win: Al Jazira 6–0 Emirates (30 November 2018)
- Biggest away win: Al Dhafra 0–5 Shabab Al Ahli (24 November 2018); Fujairah 0–5 Al Jazira (14 February 2019)
- Highest scoring: Shabab Al-Ahli 4–5 Al Jazira (30 August 2018); Sharjah 6–3 Al Nasr (14 September 2018); Al Wasl 6–3 Fujairah (1 November 2018)
- Longest winning run: Sharjah (9 games)
- Longest unbeaten run: Sharjah (23 games)
- Longest winless run: Dibba Al Fujairah (13 games)
- Longest losing run: Dibba Al Fujairah (7 games)
- Highest attendance: Al Ain 1–2 Sharjah (18,103)
- Lowest attendance: Dibba Al Fujairah 3–1 Al Dhafra (39)
- Average attendance: 464
- All statistics correct as of 26 May 2019.

The 2018–19, UAE Pro League was the 45th edition with Al Ain being the defending champions after winning their 13th title. Both Baniyas and Kalba returned to the pro league after getting relegated back at 2017. After losing Al Shabab and Dubai last season, the league has been reduced to 12 teams. Both the teams needed to get back to 14 teams so they held a relegation play off between bottom two teams of last year and the 3rd and 4th placed teams of the 2nd division. Sharjah set a record of the longest unbeaten run in a UAE Pro League season for 23 games before losing to Al Wasl 3–2. In 2019, Sharjah won their first title since 1996 after beating Al Wahda 3–2, this was the first time a team outside of Dubai and Abu Dhabi won the league since the 1996. On 26 May, Emirates and Dibba Al Fujairah were relegated after a fixed match between Shabab Al Ahli and Fujairah favored Fujairah and got them out of relegation. The Emirates demanded that the UAEFA investigate on the match between Shabab Al Ahli and Fujairah, questioning the legitimacy of the two penalties that was rewarded to Fujairah and the two goals that was disallowed for Shabab Al Ahli. However, the UAE court later rejected their complaint and the team got relegated.

== Changes ==
=== To Division 1 ===
Relegated to UAE Division 1

- Hatta

=== From Division 1 ===
Promoted to UAE Pro League

- Baniyas
- Ittihad Kalba
- Fujairah

== Teams ==
=== Stadia and locations ===
Locations of teams in the 2018–19 UAE Pro League

Note: Table lists clubs in alphabetical order.

Club	Home city	Stadium	Capacity
Ajman	Ajman	Ajman Stadium	5,537
Al Ain	Al-Ain	Hazza Bin Zayed Stadium	25,965
Al Dhafra	Madinat Zayed	Al Dhafra Stadium	5,020
Al Jazira	Abu Dhabi (Al Nahyan)	Mohammad Bin Zayed Stadium	42,056
Al Nasr	Dubai (Bur Dubai)	Al-Maktoum Stadium	15,058
Al Wahda	Abu Dhabi (Al Nahyan)	Al Nahyan Stadium	12,201
Al Wasl	Dubai (Bur Dubai)	Zabeel Stadium	8,439
Baniyas	Abu Dhabi (Al Shamkha)	Baniyas Stadium	10,000
Dibba Al Fujairah	Fujairah*	Fujairah Club Stadium*	10,645
Emirates	Ras Al Khaimah	Emirates Club Stadium	5,200
Fujairah	Fujairah	Fujairah Club Stadium	10,645
Ittihad Kalba	Kalba	Ittihad Kalba Stadium	8,500
Shabab Al Ahli	Dubai (Deira)	Dubai Club Stadium	7,500
Sharjah	Sharjah	Sharjah Stadium	11,073

* = Dibba Al Fujairah Stadium doesn't fit UAE Pro League requirements, therefore Dibba Al Fujairah shares Fujairah Club Stadium with Fujairah club

=== Personnel and kits ===
Note: Flags indicate national team as has been defined under FIFA eligibility rules. Players may hold more than one non-FIFA nationality.

Team	Head coach	Captain	Kit manufacturer	Shirt sponsor
Ajman	(Egypt) Ayman El Ramady	(United Arab Emirates) Rashid Malallah	Hummel	Ajman Bank
Al Ain	(Spain) Juan Carlos Garrido	(United Arab Emirates) Ismail Ahmed	Nike	First Gulf Bank
Al Dhafra	(Serbia) Vuk Rašović	(United Arab Emirates) Ahmed Ali	Adidas	Ruwais
Al Jazira	(Netherlands) Damiën Hertog	(United Arab Emirates) Ali Khasif	Adidas	IPIC
Al Nasr	(Brazil) Caio Zanardi	(Spain) Álvaro Negredo	Nike	Emirates NBD
Al Wahda	(Netherlands) Henk ten Cate	(United Arab Emirates) Ismail Matar	Adidas	Cadillac
Al Wasl	(Romania) Laurențiu Reghecampf	(Brazil) Caio Canedo	New Balance	Emaar Properties
Baniyas	(Croatia) Krunoslav Jurčić	(United Arab Emirates) Yousif Jaber	Adidas	Secure Engineering
Dibba Al Fujairah	(United Arab Emirates) Mohamed Al Khaddeim	(Morocco) Driss Fettouhi	Uhlsport	N/A
Emirates	(Tunisia) Jalel Kadri	(United Arab Emirates) Ahmed Al-Shaji	Uhlsport	Al Naeem City Center
Fujairah	(United Arab Emirates) Abdullah Mesfer	(United Arab Emirates) Hilal Saeed	Nike	Asas
Ittihad Kalba	(Italy) Fabio Viviani	(United Arab Emirates) Mansor Abbas	Erreà	N/A
Shabab Al Ahli	(Argentina) Rodolfo Arruabarrena	(United Arab Emirates) Majed Naser	Nike	Nakheel Properties
Sharjah	(United Arab Emirates) Abdulaziz Mohamed	(United Arab Emirates) Shahin Abdulrahman	Adidas	Saif Zone

=== Managerial changes ===
Team	Outgoing manager	Date of vacancy	Manner of departure	Pos.	Incoming manager	Date of appointment
Fujairah	(Argentina) Diego Maradona	28 April 2018	Sacked	Pre-season	(Czech Republic) Ivan Hašek	29 May 2018
Al Jazira	(Netherlands) Henk ten Cate	17 May 2018	End of contract	Pre-season	(Netherlands) Marcel Keizer	2 June 2018
Al Wasl	(Argentina) Rodolfo Arruabarrena	30 June 2018	End of contract	Pre-season	(Bolivia) Gustavo Quinteros	12 May 2018
Al Dhafra	(North Macedonia) Gjoko Hadžievski	30 June 2018	End of contract	Pre-season	(Serbia) Vuk Rašović	20 May 2018
Baniyas	(Serbia) Goran Tufegdžić	30 May 2018	End of contract	Pre-season	(Croatia) Krunoslav Jurčić	28 May 2018
Shabab Al Ahli	(United Arab Emirates) Mahdi Ali	30 May 2018	End of contract	Pre-season	(Chile) José Luis Sierra	28 May 2018
Emirates	(Ba'athist Syria) Nizar Mahrous	30 May 2018	End of contract	Pre-season	(Tunisia) Jalel Kadri	28 May 2018
Ittihad Kalba	(Brazil) Jorvan Vieira	4 September 2018	Sacked	13th	(Italy) Fabio Viviani	2 September 2018
Shabab Al Ahli	(Chile) José Luis Sierra	14 October 2018	Sacked	8th	(Argentina) Rodolfo Arruabarrena	14 October 2018
Al Wasl	(Bolivia) Gustavo Quinteros	23 October 2018	Sacked	9th	(Romania) Laurențiu Reghecampf	26 December 2018
Dibba Al Fujairah	(Brazil) Paulo Comelli	26 October 2018	Sacked	14th	(Ba'athist Syria) Mohammad Kwid	26 October 2018
Al Jazira	(Netherlands) Marcel Keizer	9 November 2018	Signed by Sporting CP	2nd	(Netherlands) Damiën Hertog	8 November 2018
Al Wahda	(Romania) Laurențiu Reghecampf	25 November 2018	Sacked	5th	(Netherlands) Henk ten Cate	8 December 2018
Al Nasr	(Serbia) Ivan Jovanović	2 December 2018	Sacked	10th	(Spain) Beñat San José	15 December 2018
Al Ain	(Croatia) Zoran Mamić	30 January 2019	Signed by Al-Hilal	3rd	(Spain) Juan Carlos Garrido	18 February 2019
Dibba Al Fujairah	(Ba'athist Syria) Mohammad Kwid	1 March 2019	Sacked	14th	(United Arab Emirates) Mohamed Al Khaddeim	2 March 2019
Fujairah	(Czech Republic) Ivan Hašek	1 March 2019	Sacked	12th	(United Arab Emirates) Abdullah Mesfer	2 March 2019
Al Nasr	(Spain) Beñat San José	31 March 2019	Sacked	11th	(Brazil) Caio Zanardi	31 March 2019

=== Foreign players ===
All teams could register as many foreign players as they want, but could only use four professionals on the field each game.

- Players name in **bold** indicates the player is registered during the mid-season transfer window.
- Players in italics were out of squad or left club within the season, after pre-season transfer window, or in the mid-season transfer window, and at least had one appearance.

Club	Player 1	Player 2	Player 3	Player 4	Former players
Ajman	(Brazil) Vander Vieira	(Morocco) Adil Hermach	(Nigeria) Stanley Ohawuchi	(Senegal) Mame Thiam	
Al Ain	(Brazil) Caio Lucas	(Japan) Tsukasa Shiotani	(Portugal) **Rúben Ribeiro**	(Sweden) Marcus Berg	(Egypt) Hussein El Shahat
Al Dhafra	(Brazil) Diego Rigonato	(Brazil) Rômulo	(Morocco) Amine Atouchi	(Uruguay) Nicolás Milesi	(Portugal) Hélder Guedes
Al Jazira	(Brazil) Leonardo Pereira	(Cameroon) Sébastien Siani	(Ghana) Ernest Asante	(Netherlands) Nacer Barazite	
Al Nasr	**(Brazil) Junior Dutra**	**(Chile) Ronnie Fernández**	**(Lebanon) Joan Oumari**	(Spain) Álvaro Negredo	(Brazil) Iury (Brazil) Marquinhos Gabriel (Brazil) Samuel (France) Yohan Cabaye
Al Wahda	(Argentina) Sebastián Tagliabué	(Brazil) Leonardo Souza	(Morocco) Mourad Batna	(South Korea) Rim Chang-woo	
Al Wasl	(Brazil) Caio Canedo	(Brazil) Fábio Lima	(Brazil) **Ronaldo Mendes**	(Brazil) Vinícius Lima	(South Korea) Oh Ban-suk
Baniyas	(Brazil) Róbson	(Colombia) Michael Ortega	(Netherlands) Leroy George	(Spain) Pedro Conde	
Dibba Al Fujairah	(Brazil) **Diogo Acosta**	(Jordan) Yaseen Al-Bakhit	(Jordan) **Yousef Al-Rawashdeh**	(Morocco) Driss Fettouhi	(Brazil) Guilherme Schettine (Kenya) Masoud Juma (Morocco) Yahya Jabrane
Emirates	(Brazil) **Kaio**	(Brazil) **Marcão**	(Mali) Cheick Diabaté	(Tunisia) **Saber Khalifa**	(Australia) Bernie Ibini-Isei (Burkina Faso) Bakare Kone (Guinea) Aboubacar Sylla
Fujairah	(Algeria) Mohamed Benyettou	(Brazil) Fernando Gabriel	(Brazil) **Samuel**	(France) Omar Kossoko	(Brazil) Jou Silva (Brazil) Ronaldo Mendes (South Korea) Lee Seung-hee
Ittihad Kalba	(Brazil) Myke	(Colombia) Tommy Tobar	(Hungary) Balázs Dzsudzsák	(Ivory Coast) Giovanni Sio	(Nigeria) Raheem Lawal (Romania) Florentin Matei
Shabab Al Ahli	(Argentina) Emiliano Vecchio	(Argentina) Mauro Díaz	(Ecuador) Jaime Ayoví	(Moldova) Henrique Luvannor	
Sharjah	(Brazil) Igor Coronado	(Brazil) Welliton	(Cape Verde) Ryan Mendes	(Uzbekistan) Otabek Shukurov	

== League table ==
Pos	Team	Pld	W	D	L	GF	GA	GD	Pts	Qualification or relegation
1	Sharjah (C)	26	17	8	1	57	30	+27	59	Qualification for AFC Champions League group stage (Note: Since league runners-up, Shabab Al Ahli, were also UAE President's Cup winners, the league 3rd place qualified for the AFC Champions League group stage.)
2	Shabab Al Ahli	26	17	2	7	57	36	+21	53	Qualification for AFC Champions League group stage
3	Al Wahda	26	14	4	8	63	40	+23	46	Qualification for AFC Champions League group stage
4	Al Ain	26	14	4	8	45	35	+10	46	Qualification for AFC Champions League play-off round
5	Al Jazira	26	13	6	7	66	41	+25	45	Qualification for Arab Champions League
6	Baniyas	26	11	7	8	50	40	+10	40	
7	Ajman	26	10	7	9	41	40	+1	37	
8	Al Nasr	26	10	6	10	42	41	+1	36	
9	Al Wasl	26	10	4	12	45	54	−9	34	Qualification for Arab Champions League
10	Al Dhafra	26	8	5	13	37	49	−12	29	
11	Kalba	26	5	10	11	41	51	−10	25	
12	Fujairah	26	5	6	15	36	63	−27	21	
13	Emirates (R)	26	4	6	16	30	62	−32	18	Relegation to UAE Division 1
14	Dibba Al Fujairah (R)	26	4	5	17	34	62	−28	17	Relegation to UAE Division 1

Source: AGLeague
Rules for classification: 1) points; 2) head-to-head points; 3) goal difference; 4) number of goals scored; 5) number of away goals scored; 6) fair play ranking 7) draw
(C) Champions; (R) Relegated

== Results ==
Home \ Away	AJM	AIN	DHA	JAZ	NAS	WAH	WAS	YAS	DAF	EMI	FUJ	KAL	SAD	SHR
Ajman		0–3	0–0	1–5	2–2	1–2	1–2	2–1	2–1	4–1	3–0	0–0	1–3	0–0
Al Ain	0–4		2–1	1–2	2–1	1–0	5–1	2–0	4–0	0–0	2–1	2–2	2–1	1–2
Al Dhafra	3–4	3–0		3–2	1–1	1–1	2–1	1–0	2–1	2–0	1–5	0–2	0–5	0–4
Al Jazira	3–0	5–1	1–1		3–1	1–3	2–0	2–2	2–2	6–0	3–2	1–1	0–1	1–1
Al Nasr	0–1	0–3	2–0	3–1		2–2	4–2	2–1	1–0	3–1	2–0	1–1	1–3	0–1
Al Wahda	3–1	1–0	2–4	1–2	1–2		4–1	4–1	3–1	2–0	5–0	6–2	2–2	2–3
Al Wasl	0–2	1–3	2–1	3–1	1–3	1–0		1–2	3–0	2–1	6–3	1–1	2–4	3–2
Baniyas	3–1	2–0	2–1	2–1	0–0	4–2	1–1		6–1	3–3	4–0	3–2	3–0	1–2
Dibba Al Fujairah	0–3	0–2	3–1	3–3	2–1	1–4	1–2	3–3		1–1	2–1	1–3	0–1	2–3
Emirates	1–1	1–3	3–2	0–3	3–3	1–3	1–2	2–3	3–2		3–1	1–1	1–5	1–2
Fujairah	2–1	2–2	1–1	0–5	0–3	3–3	3–3	1–1	2–1	0–1		3–3	0–1	0–1
Ittihad Kalba	2–3	1–2	0–3	2–4	3–1	2–4	3–1	0–0	1–3	2–0	2–3		1–3	1–1
Shabab Al Ahli	2–2	2–0	3–2	4–5	1–0	0–1	3–2	4–1	3–1	2–1	1–3	2–1		1–2
Sharjah	1–1	2–2	2–1	3–2	6–3	3–2	1–1	2–1	2–2	4–0	3–0	2–2	2–0	

Source: AGLeague
Legend: Blue = home team win; Yellow = draw; Red = away team win.

== Season statistics ==
As of 26 May 2019

Rank	Player	Club	Goals
1	(Argentina) Sebastián Tagliabué	Al Wahda	27
2	(Brazil) Welliton	Sharjah	20
2	(United Arab Emirates) Ali Mabkhout	Al Jazira	20
4	(Spain) Pedro Conde	Baniyas	18
5	(Brazil) Igor Coronado	Sharjah	17
6	(Spain) Álvaro Negredo	Al Nasr	16
7	(Algeria) Mohamed Benyettou	Fujairah	14
8	(Brazil) Caio Canedo	Al Wasl	13
8	(Brazil) Fábio Lima	Al Wasl	13
8	(Brazil) Leonardo Souza	Al Wahda	13
11	(Brazil) Leonardo Pereira	Al Jazira	12
11	(Ecuador) Jaime Ayoví	Shabab Al Ahli	12
11	(Moldova) Henrique Luvannor	Shabab Al Ahli	12

== Number of teams by Emirates ==
	Emirate	Number of teams	Teams
1	(Emirate of Abu Dhabi) Abu Dhabi	5	Al Ain, Al Jazira, Al Wahda, Baniyas and Al Dhafra
2	(Emirate of Dubai) Dubai	3	Shabab Al Ahli, Al Nasr and Al Wasl
3	(Emirate of Sharjah) Sharjah	2	Sharjah and Kalba
3	(Emirate of Fujairah) Fujairah	2	Dibba Al Fujairah and Fujairah
4	(Emirate of Ajman) Ajman	1	Ajman
4	(Emirate of Ras Al Khaimah) Ras Al Khaimah	1	Emirates
