= Abu Dhabi Classico =

Rivalry between Al Ain and Al Wahda

- Other names: Al Classico
- Location: Abu Dhabi
- Teams: Al Ain; Al Wahda
- First meeting: 8 November 1985; Football League; Al Ain 3–3 Al Wahda
- Latest meeting: 1 may 2026 adib cup Al Wahda 0(4)-0(2) Al Ain
- Stadiums: Hazza bin Zayed (Al Ain); Al Nahyan (Al Wahda)

Statistics
- Total meetings: 110 (official matches)
- Most wins: Al Ain (52)
- Top scorer: Majid Al Owais (11)

The Abu Dhabi Classico or the Al Classico is the rivalry between Al Ain and Al Wahda. The rivalry was first contested around the mid 1980s and has been the biggest derby in the Emirate of Abu Dhabi. Al Ain is from the city of Al Ain in the Eastern region of the emirate while Al Wahda is from the city of Abu Dhabi in the Central region. Both clubs are among the most successful teams in the UAE with Al Ain having 36 honours while Al Wahda has 16 honours.

== History ==
The rivalry between the two teams stems from the fact that they are the most successful clubs in Emirate of Abu Dhabi. Al Ain established themselves as a top club in Abu Dhabi by winning two Abu Dhabi championships in 1974 and 1975 and later a top club in the country when they won the League title in 1977. Al Wahda's success was limited during that time. The rivalry sparked when the two clubs started exchanging titles around 1997 to 2005, Al Wahda won three titles while Al Ain won five, three out of those eight seasons had both clubs finish at the top two. The 2004–05 season was one the most significant time as Al Wahda won the league title while Al Ain won the president's cup with a 3–1 score line at extra time. Even though Al Ain would win five more league titles while Al Wahda only won once, matches between the two continue to spark major controversies and the two clubs rarely sign players and managers that have represented the other club to this day. During a fixture between the two in March 2022, fighting broke out between fans of both clubs after Al Ain won 1–0. Abu Dhabi police had to arrest several football fans during the incident.

=== Background ===
Al Ain being from the Eastern region while Al Wahda hails from the city of Abu Dhabi, the two clubs compete to the claim the title of Abu Dhabi's best club. Many argue that this rivalry is the most significant in the country as the two clubs had the longest duel of battling titles from the late 90s to early 2000s, however with teams like Shabab Al Ahli and Al Jazira gaining momentum in recent years, both clubs has shifted their focus away from traditionally competing against each other.

== Statistics ==
=== Overview ===
As of 20 May 2024

Matches
Matches	Al Ain wins	Draws	Al Wahda wins	Al Ain	Goals	Al Wahda
110	52	22	36	171	306	135

=== Head to head ===
The below list is since the professional era started in 2008–09.

	Matches	Wins		Draws	Goals		Home wins		Home draws		Away wins		Other venue wins	
	Matches	AIN	WAH	Draws	AIN	WAH	AIN	WAH	AIN	WAH	AIN	WAH	AIN	WAH
Pro League	31	17	8	6	48	26	10	4	1	5	7	4		
President's Cup	1	1			1		1							
League Cup	14	5	5	4	15	12	1		3	2	3	3	1	1
Super Cup	1			1	3	3							1	
All competitions	47	23	13	11	67	41	12	4	4	7	10	7	2	1
Exhibition games	2	2			6	2	1						1	
All matches	49	25	13	11	73	43	13	4	4	7	10	7	3	1

== Records ==
=== Results ===
==== Biggest wins ====
Result	Date	Competition
Al Wahda 5–1 Al Ain	1986	Pro League
Al Ain 4–1 Al Wahda	19 January 1998	Pro League
Al Ain 5–3 Al Wahda	30 October 2002	Pro League
Al Wahda 4–1 Al Ain	14 December 2005	Pro League
Al Wahda 4–3 Al Ain	16 May 2008	Pro League
Al Ain 4–2 Al Wahda	25 April 2009	Pro League
Al Ain 4–0 Al Wahda	10 December 2014	Pro League
Al Ain 6–2 Al Wahda	1 March 2018	Pro League
Al Wahda 0–4 Al Ain	12 March 2021	Pro League
Al Wahda 0–3 Al Ain	10 March 2023	Pro League
Al Ain 4–1 Al Wahda	2 June 1994	President's Cup
Al Wahda 1–4 Al Ain	2 March 2012	League Cup
Al Ain 3–0 Al Wahda	9 September 2013	League Cup
Al Wahda 5–1 Al Ain	16 February 2018	League Cup
Al Wahda 4–1 Al Ain	1986	Federation Cup
Al Wahda 4–0 Al Ain	11 November 1999	Federation Cup
Al Wahda 1–4 Al Ain	27 February 2006	Federation Cup

==== Most goals in a match ====
Goals	Result	Date	Competition
8	Al Ain 5–3 Al Wahda	30 October 2002	Pro League
8	Al Ain 6–2 Al Wahda	1 March 2018	Pro League
7	Al Wahda 4–3 Al Ain	16 May 2008	Pro League

=== Players ===
As of 20 May 2024

==== Goalscoring ====
===== Top goalscorers =====
- Does not include friendly matches.

Rank	Player	Club	Goals
1	(United Arab Emirates) Majid Al Owais	Al Ain	11
2	(Argentina) (United Arab Emirates) Sebastián Tagliabúe	Al Wahda	8
3	(Togo) Kodjo Laba	Al Ain	5
3	(United Arab Emirates) Ismail Matar	Al Wahda	5
3	(United Arab Emirates) Mohamed Al-Shehhi	Al Wahda	5
3	(United Arab Emirates) Mohammed Salem	Al Wahda	5
7	(Morocco) Soufiane Rahimi	Al Ain	4
7	(Sweden) Marcus Berg	Al Ain	4
7	(Ghana) Asamoah Gyan	Al Ain	4
7	(United Arab Emirates) Sultan Rashed	Al Ain	4
7	(United Arab Emirates) Abdulrahim Jumaa	Al Wahda	4
7	(United Arab Emirates) Abdulsalam Jumaa	Al Wahda	4
7	(United Arab Emirates) Subait Khater	Al Ain	4
13	(Brazil) Caio Lucas	Al Ain	3
13	(Hungary) Balázs Dzsudzsák	Al Wahda	3
13	(United Arab Emirates) Ibrahim Diaky	Al Ain	3
13	(United Arab Emirates) Haider Alo Ali	Al Wahda	3
13	(Bosnia and Herzegovina) Slaviša Mitrović	Al Wahda	3
13	(Sierra Leone) Lamin Conteh	Al Wahda	3
13	(United Arab Emirates) Gharib Harib	Al Ain	3
13	(United Arab Emirates) Mohammad Omar	Al Ain	3
13	(Ghana) Arthur Moses	Al Ain	3
13	(United Arab Emirates) Fahed Masoud	Al Wahda	3
13	(United Arab Emirates) Salem Johar	Al Ain	3
13	(United Arab Emirates) Ahmed Abdullah	Al Ain	3

==== Hat-tricks ====
only 2 players have scored a hat-trick in Classico matches.

No.	Player	For	Total
1	(United Arab Emirates) Salem Johar	Al Ain	1
2	(United Arab Emirates) Ahmed Abdullah	Al Ain	1

==== Double ====
No.	Player	For	Total
1	(United Arab Emirates) Majid Al Owais	Al Ain	3
1	(Brazil) Alecsandro	Al Wahda	1
1	(Morocco) Soufiane Alloudi	Al Ain	1
1	(Brazil) André Dias	Al Ain	1
1	(Senegal) Matar Coly	Al Wahda	1
1	(United Arab Emirates) Ali Msarri	Al Ain	1
1	(United Arab Emirates) Mohammad Omar	Al Ain	1
1	(Ghana) Arthur Moses	Al Ain	1
1	(United Arab Emirates) Mohammed Salem	Al Wahda	1
1	(United Arab Emirates) Saeed Ashour	Al Ain	1
1	(United Arab Emirates) Matar Al Sahbani	Al Ain	1

Notes

- Not including friendly matches.

== General performances ==
=== General information ===
	Al Ain	Al Wahda
Club name after establishment	Al Ain Sports Club	Al Wahda Sports and Cultural Club
Founding date	1 August 1968	3 June 1984
Stadium	Hazza bin Zayed	Al Nahyan
Capacity	25,053	15,894
Number of seasons in Pro League (never been relegated)	47	37
Most goals scored in a season in the Pro League	74 (2012–13)	75 (2004–05)
Most points in a season in the Pro League	65 (2021–22)	65 (1998–99)
Number of the Double wins (Pro League and President's Cup)	1 (Note: 2017–18)	0
Number of the Double wins (Pro League and AFC Champions League)	1 (Note: 2002–03)	0
Number of the Treble wins (Pro League, President's Cup and AFC Champions League)	0 (Note: In 2002–03 Al Ain won the (Pro League, Super Cup and AFC Champions League), but Supercups don't count for treble)	0

=== Honours ===
- Numbers with this background indicate the record in the competition.

Al Ain	Competition	Al Wahda
Domestic
14	Pro League	4
7	President's Cup	2
5	Federation Cup (defunct) / League Cup	6
5	Super Cup	4
Minor
2	Abu Dhabi Championship (defunct)	—
1	Joint League (defunct)	—
34	Total	16
Regional
1	GCC Champions League	—
1	Emirati-Moroccan Super Cup	—
2	Total	0
Asia
2	AFC Champions League	—
2	Total	0
38	Grand total	16

== Shared players and managers ==
=== Players ===
The number of players that have played for both clubs are limited with the exception of a few local veterans. Only four foreign players have played for both clubs so far.

Saeed Al-Kathiri is the only player to score for and against both clubs.

==== Al Ain, then Al Wahda ====
Player	Al Ain career			Al Wahda career		
Player	Span	League apps	League goals	Span	League apps	League goals
(United Arab Emirates) Mutaz Abdulla	1998–2009	212	0	2009–2012	24	0
(United Arab Emirates) Fares Jumaa	2007–2015	77	6	2020–present	56	3
(Chile) Jorge Valdivia	2008–2010	25	12	2015–2017	34	8
(United Arab Emirates) Mohammed Al-Dhahri	2010–2015	18	0	2015–2018	28	0
(United Arab Emirates) Salem Sultan	2013	0	0	2013–2019	55	1
(United Arab Emirates) Rashed Muhayer	2013–2019	31	0	2020–2022	14	0
(South Korea) Lee Myung-joo	2014–2017	70	5	2020–2022	37	3
(Argentina) Cristian Guanca	2021–2022	25	8	2023–2024	9	2

==== Al Wahda, then Al Ain ====
Player	Al Wahda career			Al Ain career		
Player	Span	League apps	League goals	Span	League apps	League goals
(United Arab Emirates) Yasser Matar	2006–2009	5	1	2016	5	0
(United Arab Emirates) Saeed Al-Kathiri	2006–2014	70	13	2015–2017	44	9
(United Arab Emirates) Yaqoub Al Hosani	2009–2012	35	0	2012–2013	12	0
(Hungary) Balázs Dzsudzsák	2016–2018	43	13	2020	4	1

=== Managers ===
So far, Tite is the only coach to have represented both clubs, briefly managing Al Ain in 2007 and Al Wahda in 2010, his time at both clubs was cut short, getting sacked quickly at Al Ain due to disagreements with the club while at Al Wahda, he would sign for his former club Corinthians.

Manager	Al Ain career						Al Wahda career					
Manager	Span	G	W	D	L	Win %	Span	G	W	D	L	Win %
(Brazil) Tite	2007	9	4	2	3	44.44	2010	5	2	3	0	40
