= 2004–05 Al Ain FC season =

Al Ain
2004–05 season
- President: Mohammed Bin Zayed
- Manager: Alain Perrin (from 13 July 2004 until 21 Oct 2004); Mohammad El Mansi* (from 21 Oct 2004 until 6 January 2005); Milan Máčala (from 7 January 2005)
- Stadium: Tahnoun bin Mohammed
- UAE Football League: 2nd
- President's Cup: Winners
- Federation Cup: Winners
- AFC Champions League: 2004: Quarter-finals; 2005: Quarter-finals (Note: Advanced to next round but the cup continued in next season.)
- Top goalscorer: League: Edílson (15); All: Edílson (22)
Home colours	Away colours	Third colours
- All statistics correct as of 16 June 2005.

The 2004–05 season was Al Ain Football Club's 37th season in existence and the club's 30th consecutive season in the top-level football league in the UAE.

== Competitions ==
=== Overview ===
Competition	First match	Last match	Starting round	Final position	Record							
Competition	First match	Last match	Starting round	Final position	Pld	W	D	L	GF	GA	GD	Win %
Football League	26 September 2004	15 May 2005	Matchday 1	2nd	26	18	3	5	54	26	+28	69.23
President's Cup	25 January 2005	16 June 2005	Round of 16	Winners	4	4	0	0	13	2	+11	100.00
Federation Cup	18 November 2004	15 December 2004	Group stage	Winners	4	3	1	0	6	2	+4	75.00
2004 ACL	14 September 2004	21 September 2004	Quarter-finals	Quarter-finals	2	0	0	2	1	5	−4	0.00
2005 ACL	9 March 2005	25 May 2005	Group stage	Quarter-finals	6	4	1	1	13	6	+7	66.67
Total					42	29	5	8	87	41	+46	69.05

Last updated: 16 June 2005
Source: Competitions

=== UAE Football League ===
==== League table ====
Pos	Team	Pld	W	D	L	GF	GA	GD	Pts
1	Al Wahda	26	20	2	4	75	35	+40	62
2	Al Ain	26	18	3	5	54	26	+28	57
3	Al Jazira	26	16	5	5	62	41	+21	53
4	Al Nasr	26	13	7	6	48	33	+15	46
5	Sharjah	26	12	6	8	59	44	+15	42

Source: rsssf.com

==== Matches ====
26 September 2004 1	Al Ain	3–1	Sharjah	Al Ain
19:50	Fakher 46'; R. Yaslam 84'; Sanogo 90'	Report	Al Anberi 49'	Stadium: Tahnoun bin Mohammed; Referee: Salah Amen

30 September 2004 2	Al Ahli	0–2	Al Ain	Dubai
19:45		Report	S. Khater 71'; M. Omar 89'	Stadium: Rashid Stadium; Referee: Mohamed Omar

4 October 2004 3	Al Nasr	3–0	Al Ain	Dubai
19:40	Bigode 22', 35', 87'	Report		Stadium: Al Maktoum Stadium; Referee: Mohamed Al-Zarouni

21 October 2004 4	Al Ain	1–3	Al Shaab	Al Ain
21:00	M. Omar 21'	Report	S. Ibraheem 22', 89'; M. Srour 27'	Stadium: Tahnoun bin Mohammed; Referee: Fareed Al-Marzouqi

27 October 2004 5	Al Dhafra	2–2	Al Ain	Abu Dhabi
21:00	S. Basheer 55'; Akaruye 59'	Report	S. Khater 44'; Fakher 65'	Stadium: Al Dhafra Stadium; Referee: Ali Al-Badwawi

25 December 2004 6	Al Ain	5–2	Al Wasl	Al Ain
16:50	M. Omar 38', 79'; Sanogo 25', 53'	Report	Majidi 77'; El Moubarki 90'	Stadium: Tahnoun bin Mohammed; Referee: Salah Amen

30 December 2004 7	Ittihad Kalba	1–2	Al Ain	Kalba
16:45	Alamiri 41'	Report	M. Omar 26'; Sanogo 75'	Stadium: Ittihad Kalba Stadium; Referee: Khaled Al-Doukhi

5 January 2005 8	Al Ain	2–1	Al Shabab	Al Ain
17:00	Sanogo 16'; F. Ali 95'	Report	Fernandes 63'	Stadium: Tahnoun bin Mohammed; Referee: Abdullah Al Bannai

10 January 2005 9	Al Wahda	2–1	Al Ain	Abu Dhabi
17:05	Mitrović 5'; Koutouan 49'	Report	S. Khater 8'	Stadium: Al Nahyan Stadium; Referee: Mohamed Omar

14 January 2005 10	Al Ain	1–0	Emirates	Al Ain
17:05	Sanogo 44'	Report		Stadium: Tahnoun bin Mohammed; Referee: Ali Al Mulla

18 January 2005 11	Dubai	0–3	Al Ain	Dubai
17:05		Report	Shehab .A 7'; Edílson 24', 43'	Stadium: Al Aweer Stadium; Referee: Mohamed Al-Zarouni

30 January 2005 12	Al Ain	2–1	Al Jazira	Al Ain
19:45	F. Ali 26'; S. Khater 65'	Report	Al-Enazi 75'	Stadium: Tahnoun bin Mohammed; Referee: Salah Amen

4 February 2005 13	Al Khaleej	0–3	Al Ain	Khor Fakkan
19:35		Report	Shehab .A 59', 73'; G. Harib 64'	Stadium: Saqr bin Mohammed Al Qasimi; Referee: Abdullah Al Bannai

13 February 2005 14	Sharjah	2–1	Al Ain	Sharjah
19:40	Al Anberi 31'; Barbosa 72'	Report	Edílson 12'	Stadium: Sharjah Stadium; Referee: Mohamed Al Junaibi

19 February 2005 15	Al Ain	2–0	Al Ahli	Al Ain
19:45	Edílson 60', 70'	Report		Stadium: Tahnoun bin Mohammed; Referee: Ali Al-Badwawi

23 February 2005 16	Al Ain	2–1	Al Nasr	Al Ain
17:35	S. Khater 84'; Edílson 89'	Report	M. Ibrahim 36'	Stadium: Tahnoun bin Mohammed; Referee: Khaled Al-Doukhi

4 March 2005 17	Al Shaab	1–1	Al Ain	Sharjah
19:45	Samereh 84' (pen.)	Report	Edílson 4'	Stadium: Khalid bin Mohammed Stadium; Referee: Fareed Al-Marzouqi

21 March 2005 18	Al Ain	2–1	Al Dhafra	Al Ain
17:50	Edílson 41'; S. Khater 89'	Report	Kambou 74'	Stadium: Tahnoun bin Mohammed; Referee: Mohamed Omar

26 March 2005 19	Al Wasl	2–2	Al Ain	Dubai
17:45	Tariq .H 58'; I. Rashid 68'	Report	Edílson 31', 40'	Stadium: Zabeel Stadium; Referee: Mohamed Al Junaibi

31 March 2005 20	Al Ain	7–0	Ittihad Kalba	Al Ain
17:50	N. Khamis 5'; G. Harib 10'; Edílson 35', 62', 86', 88'; Msarri 71'	Report		Stadium: Tahnoun bin Mohammed; Referee: Ali Al-Badwawi

10 April 2005 21	Al Shabab	0–1	Al Ain	Dubai
19:30		Report	G. Harib 28'	Stadium: Maktoum bin Rashid Al Maktoum; Referee: Fareed Al-Marzouqi

15 April 2005 22	Al Ain	2–1	Al Wahda	Al Ain
20:10	Msarri 25', 75'	Report	I. Matar 89'	Stadium: Tahnoun bin Mohammed; Referee: Salah Amen

25 April 2005 23	Emirates	0–2	Al Ain	Ras al-Khaimah
19:35		Report	G. Harib 10'; S. Khater 88'	Stadium: Emirates Club Stadium; Referee: Mohamed Al-Zarouni

30 April 2005 24	Al Ain	3–0	Dubai	Al Ain
19:35	Shehab .A 20'; Edílson 71'; Sanogo 80'	Report		Stadium: Tahnoun bin Mohammed; Referee: Khaled Al-Doukhi

5 May 2005 25	Al Jazira	2–0	Al Ain	Abu Dhabi
19:40	Alebri 55'; Diaky 70'	Report		Stadium: Mohammed bin Zayed; Referee: Fareed Al-Marzouqi

15 May 2005 26	Al Ain	2–0	Al Khaleej	Al Ain
19:40	Sanogo 63', 89'	Report		Stadium: Tahnoun bin Mohammed; Referee: Abdullah Al Bannai

=== UAE President's Cup ===
25 January 2005 Round of 16	Al Ain	7–1	Al Urooba	Dubai
18:45	F. Ali 24', 27', 59'; Edílson 28'; Msarri 56'; R. Yaslam 75'; G. Harib 85'	Report	Al-Abdooli 83'	Stadium: Al Maktoum Stadium; Referee: Waleed Ali Yousif

28 February 2005 Quarter-finals	Al Ain	1–0	Al Jazira	Dubai
19:00	R. Yaslam 105'	Report		Stadium: Zabeel Stadium; Referee: Mohamed Omar

9 June 2005 Semi-finals	Al Ain	2–0	Al Wasl	Abu Dhabi
19:55	Edílson 23'; H. Saeed 54'	Report		Stadium: Al Nahyan Stadium; Referee: Mohamed Omar

16 June 2005 Final	Al Ain	3–1	Al Wahda	Abu Dhabi
20:00	Edílson 17'; Shehab .A 100'; Sanogo 115'	Report	Haider .A 20'	Stadium: Zayed Sports City; Referee: Fareed Al-Marzouqi

=== UAE Federation Cup ===
==== Group B ====
Team	Pld	W	D	L	GF	GA	GD	Pts
Al Ain	2	1	1	0	4	1	+3	4
Al Jazira	2	1	0	1	1	3	−2	3
Al Khaleej	2	0	1	1	1	2	−1	1

Source: Goalzz.com

18 November 2004 1	Al Ain	1–1	Al Khaleej	Al Ain
16:45	F. Ali 69'	Report; Report	M. Malallah 58' (pen.)	Stadium: Tahnoun bin Mohammed

1 December 2004 2	Al Jazira	0–3	Al Ain	Abu Dhabi
16:50		Report; Report	Sanogo 32'; H. Saeed 85'; M. Omar 89' (pen.)	Stadium: Mohammed bin Zayed; Referee: Abdullah Al Bannai

==== Semi-finals ====
9 December 2004	Al Ain	1–0	Al Nasr	Abu Dhabi
18:00	R. Yaslam 61'	Report; Report		Stadium: Mohammed bin Zayed; Referee: Salah Amen

==== Final ====
15 December 2004	Al Ain	1–1 (a.e.t.) (10–9 p)	Al Ahli	Abu Dhabi
18:30	Shehab .A 65'	Report; Report	Adel .A 20'	Stadium: Al Nahyan Stadium; Referee: Mohamed Omar

=== 2004 AFC Champions League ===
==== Quarter-finals ====
14 September 2004 First leg	Al Ain (United Arab Emirates)	0–1	(South Korea) Jeonbuk Hyundai Motors	Al Ain
18:45		Report	Gomes 90+3'	Stadium: Tahnoun bin Mohammed

21 September 2004 Second leg	Jeonbuk Hyundai Motors (South Korea)	4–1 (5–1 agg.)	(United Arab Emirates) Al Ain	Jeonju
14:00	Do 52'; Rink 68'; Gomes 89'; Dong-Hyuk 90+3' (pen.)	Report	R. Yaslam 88'	Stadium: Jeonju World Cup Stadium

=== 2005 AFC Champions League ===
==== Group B ====
Team	Pld	W	D	L	GF	GA	GD	Pts
(United Arab Emirates) Al Ain	6	4	1	1	13	6	+7	13
(Iran) Sepahan	6	3	2	1	10	6	+4	11
(Saudi Arabia) Al Shabab	6	3	1	2	7	7	0	10
(Syria) Al Wahda	6	0	0	6	5	16	−11	0

Source: afcchampionsleague.com

9 March 2005	Al Ain (United Arab Emirates)	3–0	(Syria) Al Wahda	Al Ain
	Shehab .A 42'; Edílson 54', 82'			Stadium: Tahnoun bin Mohammed

16 March 2005	Sepahan (Iran)	1–1	(United Arab Emirates) Al Ain	Isfahan
	Bezik 36'		Kano 49'	Stadium: Naghsh-e Jahan Stadium

6 April 2005	Al Ain (United Arab Emirates)	3–0	(Saudi Arabia) Al Shabab	Al Ain
	Edílson 29', 31'; S. Khater 47'			Stadium: Tahnoun bin Mohammed

20 April 2005	Al Shabab (Saudi Arabia)	1–0	(United Arab Emirates) Al Ain	Riyadh
	Attram 77'			Stadium: King Fahd International Stadium

11 May 2005	Al Wahda (Syria)	2–3	(United Arab Emirates) Al Ain	Damascus
	Al-Sayed 58', 65'		Sanogo 80'; N. Khamis 83'; S. Khater 90+5'	Stadium: Abbasiyyin Stadium

25 May 2005	Al Ain (United Arab Emirates)	3–2	(Iran) Sepahan	Al Ain
	S. Khater 11'; Sanogo 31', 70'		M. Karimi 69'; Bengar 82'	Stadium: Tahnoun bin Mohammed

== Statistics ==
=== Goalscorers ===
As of 16 June 2005

Includes all competitive matches. The list is sorted alphabetically by surname when total goals are equal.

Rank	Pos.	Player	Football League	President's Cup	Federation Cup	2004 ACL	2005 ACL	Total
1	FW	(Brazil) Edílson	15	3	0	0	4	22
2	FW	(Ivory Coast) Boubacar Sanogo	9	1	1	0	3	14
3	MF	(United Arab Emirates) Subait Khater	7	0	0	0	3	10
4	MF	(United Arab Emirates) Shehab Ahmed	4	1	1	0	1	7
5	FW	(United Arab Emirates) Mohammad Omar	5	0	1	0	0	6
5	FW	(United Arab Emirates) Faisal Ali	2	3	1	0	0	6
7	MF	(United Arab Emirates) Gharib Harib	4	1	0	0	0	5
7	MF	(United Arab Emirates) Rami Yaslam	1	2	1	1	0	5
9	DF	(United Arab Emirates) Ali Msarri	3	1	0	0	0	4
10	MF	(United Arab Emirates) Helal Saeed	0	1	1	0	0	2
10	FW	(United Arab Emirates) Nasser Khamis	1	0	0	0	1	2
10	DF	(United Arab Emirates) Humaid Fakher	2	0	0	0	0	2
13	MF	(United Arab Emirates) Salem Johar	1	0	0	0	0	1
13	DF	(Oman) Ahmed Kano	0	0	0	0	1	1
Own goals (from the opponents)			0	0	0	0	0	0
Totals			54	13	6	1	13	87
