= Abdulaziz Mohamed =

Emirati footballer (born 1965)

Personal information
- Full name: Abdulaziz Mohamed Ali Kahoor
- Date of birth: 12 December 1965 (age 60)
- Position: Forward

Youth career
- 1974–1980: Sharjah

Senior career*
Years	Team	Apps	(Gls)
1980–2003	Sharjah		(127)

International career
1988–1996	United Arab Emirates	15	(3)
- * Club domestic league appearances and goals

Abdulaziz Mohamed Ali Kahoor (Arabic: عَبْد الْعَزِيز مُحَمَّد عَلِيّ كاهور; born 12 December 1965) is an Emirati retired professional footballer who played as a forward for the United Arab Emirates national team and Sharjah. He was a member of United Arab Emirates squad in the 1990 FIFA World Cup in Italy and the 1997 FIFA Confederations Cup in Saudi Arabia.

== Honours ==
Sharjah

- UAE Football League: 1986–87, 1988–89, 1993–94, 1995–96
- UAE President's Cup: 1981–82, 1982–83, 1990–91, 1994–95, 1997–98, 2002–03

United Arab Emirates

- AFC Asian Cup runners-up: 1996

Individual

- UAE Football League top scorer: 1993–94
- GCC Golden Boot: 1993–94
