= 1997–98 Al Ain FC season =

Al Ain
1997–98 season
- President: Mohammed Bin Zayed
- Manager: Cabralzinho; Shaker Abdel-Fattah
- Stadium: Tahnoun bin Mohammed
- Football League: 1st
- President's Cup: Semi-Finals
- Top goalscorer: League: All: Salem Johar
Home colours	Away colours	Third colours

The 1997–98 season was Al Ain Football Club's 30th in existence and the club's 23rd consecutive season in the top-level football league in the UAE.

== Kits ==
Home	Away	Third	Fourth	Fifth

== Club ==
=== Technical staff ===
Position	Name
Head coach	(Egypt) Shaker Abdel-Fattah
Assistant coach	(United Arab Emirates) Ahmed Abdullah
Team Manager	(United Arab Emirates) Rabea Ibrahim

== Competitions ==
=== UAE Football League ===
==== League table ====
First stage
Pos	Team	Pld	W	D	L	GF	GA	GD	Pts
1	Al Wahda	18	10	4	4	32	19	+13	34
2	Sharjah	18	8	8	2	40	22	+18	32
3	Al Ain	18	8	5	5	24	17	+7	29
4	Al Wasl	18	5	12	1	23	17	+6	27
5	Al Jazira	18	7	4	7	20	22	−2	25

Source: rsssf.com

Second stage
Pos	Team	Pld	W	D	L	GF	GA	GD	BP	Pts
1	Al Ain (C)	14	9	4	1	25	12	+13	1	32
2	Sharjah	14	8	4	2	29	15	+14	2	30
3	Al Wasl	14	6	5	3	16	12	+4	0	23
4	Al Ahli	14	5	3	6	21	22	−1	0	18
5	Al Wahda	14	3	6	5	14	18	−4	3	18

Source: rsssf.com
(C) Champions

==== Matches ====
===== First stage =====
15 September 1997 1	Al Shabab	1–1	Al Ain	Dubai
				Stadium: Maktoum bin Rashid Al Maktoum

20 September 1997 2	Al Wahda	1–0	Al Ain	Abu Dhabi
				Stadium: Al Nahyan

26 September 1997 3	Al Ain	3–0	Baniyas	Al Ain
				Stadium: Tahnoun bin Mohammed

2 October 1997 4	Al Ain	2–0	Al Ahli	Al Ain
				Stadium: Tahnoun bin Mohammed

10 October 1997 5	Al Jazira	2–1	Al Ain	Abu Dhabi
				Stadium: Al Jazira Stadium

16 October 1997 6	Al Ain	0–0	Al Wasl	Al Ain
				Stadium: Tahnoun bin Mohammed

21 October 1997 7	Ittihad Kalba	0–0	Al Ain	Kalba
				Stadium: Ittihad Kalba Stadium

24 October 1997 8	Al Ain	3–4	Sharjah	Al Ain
				Stadium: Tahnoun bin Mohammed

30 October 1997 9	Al Nasr	2–1	Al Ain	Dubai
	Al Safar 28'; K. Ali 88'		S. Sultan 49'	Stadium: Al Maktoum; Referee: Eisa Saleh

7 November 1997 10	Al Ain	1–0	Al Shabab	Al Ain
				Stadium: Tahnoun bin Mohammed

10 November 1997 11	Al Ain	2–1	Al Wahda	Al Ain
				Stadium: Tahnoun bin Mohammed

13 November 1997 12	Baniyas	1–2	Al Ain	Bani Yas
				Stadium: Baniyas Stadium

20 November 1997 13	Al Ahli	1–0	Al Ain	Dubai
				Stadium: Rashid

28 November 1997 14	Al Ain	1–0	Al Jazira	Al Ain
				Stadium: Tahnoun bin Mohammed

1 December 1997 15	Al Wasl	1–1	Al Ain	Dubai
				Stadium: Zabeel

4 December 1997 16	Al Ain	4–2	Ittihad Kalba	Al Ain
				Stadium: Tahnoun bin Mohammed

12 December 1997 17	Sharjah	1–1	Al Ain	Sharjah
				Stadium: Sharjah

19 December 1997 18	Al Ain	1–0	Al Nasr	Al Ain
				Stadium: Tahnoun bin Mohammed

===== Second stage =====
25 December 1997 1	Al Shabab	2–3	Al Ain	Dubai
				Stadium: Maktoum bin Rashid Al Maktoum

5 January 1998 2	Al Ahli	0–1	Al Ain	Dubai
				Stadium: Rashid

8 January 1998 3	Al Ain	1–1	Sharjah	Al Ain
				Stadium: Tahnoun bin Mohammed

16 January 1998 4	Al Nasr	0–2	Al Ain	Dubai
			M. Mohamed 71'	Stadium: Al Maktoum; Referee: Eisa Saleh

19 January 1998 5	Al Ain	4–1	Al Wahda	Al Ain
				Stadium: Tahnoun bin Mohammed

13 February 1998 7	Al Ain	3–1	Al Jazira	Al Ain
				Stadium: Tahnoun bin Mohammed

19 February 1998 8	Al Ain	0–0	Al Shabab	Al Ain
				Stadium: Tahnoun bin Mohammed

23 February 1998 6	Al Wasl	1–1	Al Ain	Dubai
				Stadium: Zabeel

27 February 1998 9	Al Ain	2–3	Al Ahli	Al Ain
	Alawi; M. Mohamed		S. Khamis; S. Abdullah; Atiq	Stadium: Tahnoun bin Mohammed; Referee: Eissa Saleh

5 March 1998 10	Sharjah	0–1	Al Ain	Sharjah
				Stadium: Sharjah

13 March 1998 11	Al Ain	1–0	Al Nasr	Al Ain
	G. Harib 44'			Stadium: Tahnoun bin Mohammed; Referee: Ali Saleh

20 March 1998 12	Al Wahda	0–0	Al Ain	Abu Dhabi
				Stadium: Al Nahyan

28 March 1998 13	Al Ain	2–1	Al Wasl	Al Ain
	Al Owais			Stadium: Tahnoun bin Mohammed

3 April 1998 14	Al Jazira	2–4	Al Ain	Abu Dhabi
		Report	Al Owais; G. Harib; M. Mohamed	Stadium: Al Jazira Stadium

=== UAE President's Cup ===
==== Round of 16 ====
First leg	Ittihad Kalba	0–0	Al Ain	Kalba
				Stadium: Ittihad Kalba Stadium

Second leg	Al Ain	3–2	Ittihad Kalba	Al Ain
				Stadium: Tahnoun bin Mohammed

==== Quarter-finals ====
First leg	Al Ahli	1–4	Al Ain	Dubai
				Stadium: Rashid Stadium

Second leg	Al Ain	3–2	Al Ahli	Al Ain
				Stadium: Tahnoun bin Mohammed

==== Semi-finals ====
14 May 1998 First leg	Al Wasl	0–1	Al Ain	Dubai
		Report	Al Owais	Stadium: Zabeel Stadium

May 1998 Second leg	Al Ain	0–2 (a.e.t./g.g.)	Al Wasl	Al Ain
		Report	M. Saeed 12'; N. Khamees 120'	Stadium: Tahnoun bin Mohammed; Referee: Younes Hassan
