= Subait Khater =

Emirati footballer (born 1980)

Personal information
- Full name: Subait Khater Fayel Khamis Al-Mukhaini
- Date of birth: 27 February 1980 (age 46)
- Place of birth: Al Ain, United Arab Emirates
- Height: 1.73 m (5 ft 8 in)
- Position: Midfielder

Youth career
- 1990–1997: Al Ain

Senior career*
Years	Team	Apps	(Gls)
1997–2008	Al Ain	203	(38)
2008–2014	Al Jazira	109	(16)
2014–2015	Fujairah	0	(0)

International career^{‡}
1999–2011	UAE	120	(12)
- * Club domestic league appearances and goals as of 24 February 2022 ‡ National team caps and goals as of 20 February 2010

Subait Khater Fayel Khamis Al-Mukhaini (Arabic: سبيت خاطر فايل خميس المخيني, born on February 27, 1980) is a retired Emirati footballer who played as a midfielder for Al Ain FC, Al-Jazira Club and the United Arab Emirates national football team. He is the father of the Al Jazira player Hazza Subait.

== Club statistics ==
=== Club ===
Club	Season	League		League Cup		Super Cup		UPC		ACL		Other		Total	
Club	Season	Apps	Goals	Apps	Goals	Apps	Goals	Apps	Goals	Apps	Goals	Apps	Goals	Apps	Goals
Al Jazira
Al Jazira	2008–09	20	2	5	0	0	0	1	0	4	1	—		30	3
Al Jazira	2009–10	21	8	4	1	0	0	3	0	4	0	—		32	9
Al Jazira	2010–11	19	3	0	0	0	0	5	0	2	0	—		26	3
Al Jazira	2011–12	17	0	6	1	1	0	4	0	7	0	—		35	1
Al Jazira	2012–13	21	3	8	1	1	0	1	0	6	2	—		37	6
Al Jazira	2013–14	11	0	6	0	0	0	1	0	3	0	—		21	0
Career total		109	16	29	3	2	0	15	0	26	3	0	0	181	22

== International goals ==
#	Date	Venue	Opponent	Score	Result	Competition
1	April 14, 2001	Bandar Seri Begawan	Brunei	12-0	Win	2002 FIFA World Cup qualification (AFC)
2	April 26, 2001	Al Ain	India	1-0	Win	2002 FIFA World Cup qualification (AFC)
3	November 18, 2003	Colombo	Sri Lanka	3-1	Win	2004 AFC Asian Cup qualification
4	December 10, 2004	Doha	Qatar	2-2	Draw	17th Arabian Gulf Cup
5	August 16, 2006	Amman	Jordan	2-1	Win	2007 AFC Asian Cup qualification
6	December 6, 2006	Abu Dhabi	Poland	2-5	Loss	Exhibition match
7	September 10, 2008	Abu Dhabi	Saudi Arabia	1-2	Loss	2010 FIFA World Cup qualification (AFC)
8	November 29, 2010	Aden	Bahrain	3-1	Win	20th Arabian Gulf Cup

== Honours ==
=== Club ===
Al Jazira

- UAE Pro League: 2010–11
- UAE President's Cup: 2010–11, 2011–12
- UAE League Cup: 2009–10

Al Ain

- UAE Pro League: 1997–98, 1999–00, 2001–02, 2002–03, 2003–04
- UAE President's Cup: 1998–99, 2000–01, 2004–05, 2005–06
- UAE Super Cup: 2003
- UAE Federation Cup: 2004–05, 2005–06
- GCC Champions League: 2001
- AFC Champions League: 2002–03

=== Individual ===
- Emirati Player of the Year: 2000–01 2004–05

== See also ==
- List of men's footballers with 100 or more international caps
