= 1982–83 Al Ain FC season =

Al Ain
1982–83 season
- President: Mohammed Bin Zayed
- Manager: Nelsinho Rosa
- Stadium: Tahnoun bin Mohammed
- Football League: 5th
- Joint League: 1st
| Home colours | Away colours | Third colours |

The 1982–83 season was Al Ain Football Club's 15th in existence and the club's 8th consecutive season in the top-level football league in the UAE.

== Club ==
=== Technical staff ===
| Position | Name |
|---|---|
| Head coach | (Brazil) Nelsinho Rosa |
| Team Manager | (United Arab Emirates) Mohamed Shamal |

== Competitions ==
=== UAE Football League ===
==== League table ====
| Pos | Team | Pld | W | D | L | GF | GA | GD | Pts |
|---|---|---|---|---|---|---|---|---|---|
| 1 | Al Wasl | 18 | 11 | 3 | 4 | 32 | 17 | +15 | 25 |
| 2 | Al Sharjah | 18 | 7 | 8 | 3 | 20 | 14 | +6 | 22 |
| 3 | Al Nasr | 18 | 6 | 8 | 4 | 21 | 21 | 0 | 20 |
| 4 | Al Ahli | 18 | 6 | 7 | 5 | 22 | 18 | +4 | 19 |
| 5 | Al Ain | 18 | 6 | 7 | 5 | 21 | 21 | 0 | 19 |
| 6 | Al Shabab | 18 | 3 | 11 | 4 | 18 | 22 | −4 | 17 |
| 7 | Al Khaleej | 18 | 5 | 7 | 6 | 15 | 20 | −5 | 17 |
| 8 | Al Emirates | 18 | 3 | 8 | 7 | 17 | 20 | −3 | 14 |
| 9 | Al Shaab | 18 | 4 | 6 | 8 | 18 | 26 | −8 | 14 |
| 10 | Al Qadsia | 18 | 3 | 7 | 8 | 14 | 19 | −5 | 13 |

Source: rsssf.com

=== UAE Joint League ===
==== Matches ====
| 1 | Al Ahli | 0–2 | Al Ain | Dubai |
| | | | Cláudio | Stadium: Rashid Stadium |

| 2 | Al Ain | 2–0 | Al Rams |

| 3 | Al Ain | 8–0 | Al Taliya |

| 4 | Al Ain | 3–0 | Fujairah |

| 5 | Ras Al Khaimah | 0–5 | Al Ain |

| 6 | Al Ain | 3–0 | Al Ahli | Al Ain |
| | Cláudio 32', 44' (pen.), 67' | Report | | Stadium: Khalifa bin Zayed; Referee: Mohammed Aboachraf |

| 7 | Al Rams | 0–1 | Al Ain |

| 8 | Al Taliya | 0–6 | Al Ain |

| 9 | Fujairah | 0–4 | Al Ain |

| 10 | Al Ain | 2–0 | Ras Al Khaimah |

| 11 | Al Shaab | 0–1 | Al Ain |

| 12 | Al Nasr | 0–2 | Al Ain |

| 13 | Al Wasl | 1–3 | Al Ain |
