= Abdulaziz Al Anbari =

Emirati footballer and manager (born 1977)

Personal information
- Full name: Abdulaziz Al Anbari
- Date of birth: 16 September 1977 (age 49)
- Place of birth: Sharjah, UAE
- Position: Midfielder

Senior career*
Years	Team	Apps	(Gls)
1994–2010	Sharjah	224	(57)

International career
1996–2006	United Arab Emirates	17	(2)

Managerial career
- 2017–2021: Sharjah
- 2022–2023: Khor Fakkan
- * Club domestic league appearances and goals

Abdulaziz Al Anbari (born 16 September 1977) is a retired Emirati footballer who played as a midfielder and a manager.

== Managerial statistics ==
As of match played 23 September 2023

Managerial record by team and tenure
Team	Nat	From	To	Record							
Team	Nat	From	To	G	W	D	L	GF	GA	GD	Win %
Sharjah	(United Arab Emirates)	15 October 2017	9 November 2021	123	61	30	32	226	161	+65	49.59
Khor Fakkan	(United Arab Emirates)	14 June 2022	24 September 2023	39	9	11	19	47	66	−19	23.08
Career total				162	70	41	51	273	227	+46	43.21

== Honours ==
=== Player ===
Sharjah

UAE League: (2)

- Champion: 1993–94, 1995–96

UAE President Cup: (3)

- Champion: 1994–95, 1997–98, 2002–03

=== Internationals ===
- AFC Asian Cup: Runner-up 1996

=== Manager ===
Sharjah

- UAE Pro-League: 2018–19
- UAE Super Cup: 2019
