= 2002–03 UAE Football League =

UAE Football League
- Season: 2002–03
- Champions: Al Ain
- Relegated: Dubai Club; Al Dhafra
- AFC Champions League: Al Ain; Al Wahda
- Top goalscorer: Cristián Montecinos (19 goals)

Statistics of UAE Football League for the 2002–03 season.

== Overview ==
It was contested by 12 teams, and Al Ain won the league.

== Personnel ==
Team	Head coach
Al Ahli	
Al Ain	(France) Bruno Metsu
Al Dhafra	
Al Jazira	(Netherlands) Jan Versleijen
Al-Nasr	(Romania) Grigore Sichitiu
Al-Shaab	(Iraq) Yahya Alwan
Al Shabab	(Germany) Reiner Hollmann
Al Wahda	(Austria) Rolf Fringer
Al Wasl	(Brazil) Arthur Bernardes
Dubai Club	
Ittihad Kalba	
Sharjah	(United Arab Emirates) Juma Rabea

== Foreign players ==
Club	Player 1	Player 2	Player 3	Player 4	Former players
Al Ahli	(Iran) Ali Karimi	(Liberia) Kelvin Sebwe	(Morocco) Rachid Benmahmoud		(Iran) Javad Kazemian
Al Ain	(Argentina) Emiliano Rey	(Iran) Farhad Majidi	(Ivory Coast) Boubacar Sanogo	(Ivory Coast) Kandia Traoré	(Kuwait) Bashar Abdullah
Al Dhafra	(Egypt) Mohamed Abdelwahab	(Morocco) Reda Ereyahi	(Morocco) Zakaria Aboub	(Nigeria) Emmanuel Ebiede	(Senegal) Diéne Faye
Al Jazira	(Liberia) George Weah	(Liberia) James Debbah	(Liberia) Joe Nagbe		
Al-Nasr	(France) Samba N'Diaye	(Ghana) Nii Lamptey	(Iran) Sattar Hamedani	(Morocco) Hicham Zerouali	
Al-Shaab	(Algeria) Youssef Salimi	(Bahrain) Rashid Al-Dosari	(Iran) Ali Samereh	(Morocco) Abderrahim Chkilit	(Iraq) Abdul-Wahab Abu Al-Hail
Al Shabab	(Brazil) Geraldo	(Cameroon) Guy Mamoun	(Ghana) Arthur Moses	(Iran) Ali Daei	(Iran) Mehrdad Minavand (Uzbekistan) Mirjalol Qosimov
Al Wahda	(Ghana) Felix Mordeku	(Nigeria) Oluwasegun Abiodun	(Qatar) Mohammed Salem Al-Enazi	(Senegal) Mbaye Badji	(Brazil) Paulo Sérgio (Tunisia) Sami Laroussi
Al Wasl	(Argentina) Walter Silvani	(Ghana) Bernard Dong Bortey	(Iran) Hamed Kavianpour		(Iran) Farhad Majidi
Dubai Club	(Brazil) Denílson	(Burundi) Juma Mossi	(Chile) Cristián Montecinos	(Tunisia) Maher Kanzari	(Mali) Mintou Doucouré (Niger) Ousmane Tiecoura
Ittihad Kalba	(Guinea) Sékou Dramé				
Sharjah	(Brazil) Anderson Barbosa	(Morocco) Karim Eddafi	(Morocco) Otmane El Assas		(Iraq) Razzaq Farhan

== League standings ==
Pos	Team	Pld	W	D	L	GF	GA	GD	Pts
1	Al Ain	22	14	6	2	51	20	+31	48
2	Al Wahda	22	12	7	3	50	29	+21	43
3	Al Ahli	22	9	7	6	47	36	+11	34
4	Al-Nasr	22	8	10	4	36	25	+11	34
5	Al-Shaab	22	8	8	6	39	31	+8	32
6	Al Jazira	22	8	7	7	33	32	+1	31
7	Sharjah	22	6	7	9	28	42	−14	25
8	Al Wasl	22	4	11	7	27	36	−9	23
9	Al Shabab	22	4	10	8	30	38	−8	22
10	Ittihad Kalba	22	4	10	8	22	31	−9	22
11	Dubai Club	22	4	5	13	36	56	−20	17
12	Al Dhafra	22	3	8	11	29	52	−23	17

Source: rsssf.com
