= Ahmed Abdullah (footballer) =

Eritrean footballer (born 1956)

Personal information
- Full name: Ahmed Abdullah Ali
- Date of birth: 1 August 1956 (age 70)
- Place of birth: Asmara, Eritrea
- Position: Forward

Senior career*
Years	Team	Apps	(Gls)
–1978	Embassoria		
1978–1995	Al Ain		(122)

Managerial career
- 1995–: Al Ain (assistant)
- * Club domestic league appearances and goals

Ahmed Abdullah Ali (Arabic: أحمد عبدالله علي; born 1 August 1956) is an Eritrean retired footballer who played as a forward for Al Ain.

== Honours ==
Al Ain

- UAE Football League: 1980–81, 1983–84, 1992–93
- UAE Joint League: 1982–83
- UAE Federation Cup: 1988–89
- UAE Super Cup: 1995

Individual

- Al Ain's top scorer of all time with 185 goals
- UAE Football League top scorer: 1981–82, 1983–84
- UAE President's Cup top scorer: 1978–79
- GCC Golden Boot: 1982–83
