= 1987–88 UAE Football League =

UAE Football League
- Season: 1987–88
- Champions: Al Wasl; 4th title
- Relegated: Al-Ittihad Kalba; Ras AlKhaima Club
- Asian Club Championship: Sharjah FC

The 1987–88 UAE Football League was the 15th season of the UAE Football League which began in 1973. Twelve teams competed in the 1987–88 season with the teams playing against each other twice over the season. At the end of the season, it was Al Wasl FC that took out their fourth title finishing ten points ahead of second place Sharjah FC.

== League standings ==
Pos	Team	Pld	W	D	L	GF	GA	GD	Pts
1	Al Wasl	22	17	1	4	65	24	+41	52
2	Sharjah	22	12	6	4	47	32	+15	42
3	Al Ahli	22	9	8	5	33	17	+16	35
4	Al Khaleej	22	9	8	5	21	19	+2	35
5	Al Ain	22	9	6	7	26	24	+2	33
6	Al Shaab	22	9	5	8	28	27	+1	32
7	Al Shabab	22	9	4	9	36	32	+4	31
8	Al Nasr	22	7	8	7	32	25	+7	29
9	Al Wahda	22	6	8	8	20	24	−4	26
10	Emirates	22	5	6	11	19	29	−10	21
11	Kalba	22	3	5	14	21	54	−33	14
12	Ras Al Khaimah	22	3	3	16	16	57	−41	12

Source: rsssf.com
