= GCC Golden Boot =

- Awarded for: Leading goalscorer from the top division of every Arabian Leagues
- Presented by: Al Hadath Sports (1980–present)
- First award: 1980 (awarded for most goals scored in the 1979–80 season)
- Currently held by: (Portugal) Cristiano Ronaldo (2 awards)

Highlights
- Most wins: (Ghana) Asamoah Gyan (3 awards)

The Arabian Golden Boot is an award for the top scorer in the Arabian Leagues. Established in 1979–80 by the Lebanese magazine event "Al Hadath Sports", the award is presented annually to the best scorer.

== Winners ==
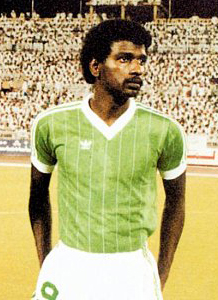
Majed Abdullah won the award in 1981,1989 & 2nd 1986.

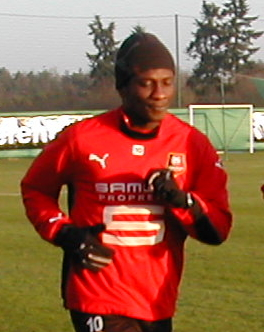
Asamoah Gyan has won the most Arabian Golden Shoe 2011/12, 2012/13, 2013/14.

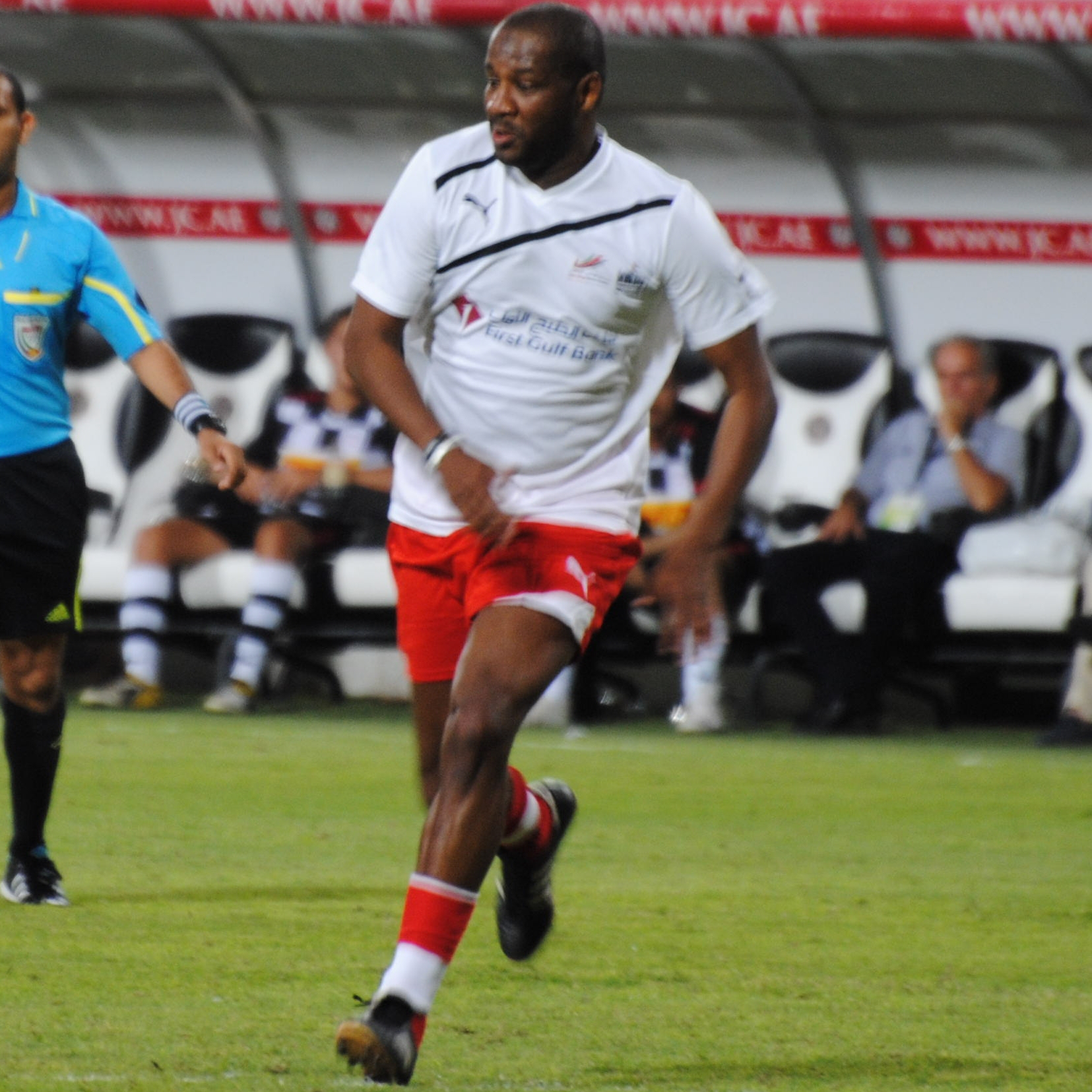
Fahad Khamees won the award in 1983.

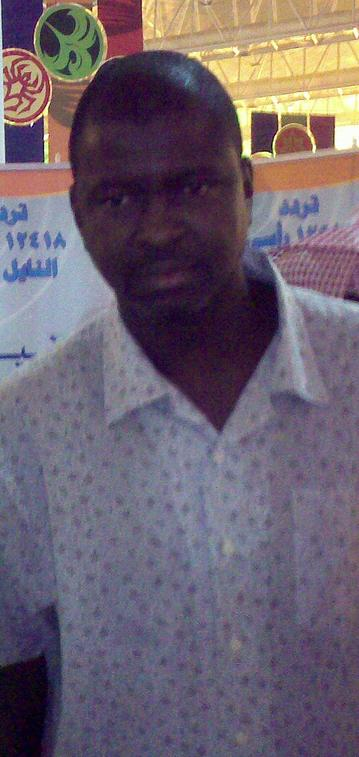
Hamzah Idris won the award in 2000 (33 goal).

Kuwait won the first award in 1980.

Qatar won the highest rate of goals in 1986.

KSA Players, won the award 8 times.

UAE League scorers, won the award 10 times.

No.	Season	Player	Club	Goals	Matches	Average
1	1979–80	(Kuwait) Jasem Yaqoub	(Kuwait) Qadsia	31	26	1.19
2	1980–81	(Saudi Arabia) Majed Abdullah	(Saudi Arabia) Al Nassr	21	18	1.16
3	1981–82	(Qatar) Mansour Muftah	(Qatar) Al Rayyan	18	12	1.50
4	1982–83	(United Arab Emirates) Fahad Khamees	(United Arab Emirates) Al Wasl	20	18	1.11
4	1982–83	(United Arab Emirates) Ahmed Abdullah	(United Arab Emirates) Al Ain	20	18	1.11
5	1983–84	(Kuwait) Talib Hussein	(Kuwait) Al Sulaibikhat	23	26	0.88
6	1984–85	(Oman) Ali Shwired	Oman	24	22	1.10
7	1985–86	(Qatar) Mansour Muftah	(Qatar) Al Rayyan	22	14	1.57
8	1986–87	(Saudi Arabia) Mohammad Swaid	(Saudi Arabia) Al Ittihad	17	22	0.77
8	1986–87	(Oman) Younis Amaan	(Oman) Dhofar	17	22	0.77
9	1987–88	(United Arab Emirates) Zuhair Bakheet	(United Arab Emirates) Al Wasl	25	22	1.13
9	1987–88	(Tunisia) Lutfi Senhaji	(Oman) Al Nasr	25	22	1.13
10	1988–89	(Saudi Arabia) Majed Abdullah	(Saudi Arabia) Al Nassr	19	22	0.86
11	1989–90	(Jordan) Khaled Al Aqouri (Note: Because of mistake in the calculation of the matches the award was given to Sami Al-Jaber, after 32 years the award returns to Khaled Al Aqouri on 2 January 2022.)	(Jordan) Al Ramtha	16	18	0.83
12	1990–91	(Saudi Arabia) Fahad Al-Mehallel	(Saudi Arabia) Al Shabab	20	25	0.80
13	1991–92	(Yemen) Sharaf Mahfoud (Note: Because of Delayed the end of Yemeni League, were selected two winners for the same season.)	(Yemen) Al Tilal	30	30	1.00
13	1991–92	(Syria) Mohammad Afash (Note: Because of Delayed the end of Yemeni League, were selected two winners for the same season.)	(Syria) Al Ittihad	19	22	0.86
14	1992–93	(United Arab Emirates) Saif Sultan	(United Arab Emirates) Al Ain	22	22	1.00
14	1992–93	(Qatar) Mubarak Mustafa	(Qatar) Al Arabi	22	22	1.00
15	1993–94	(United Arab Emirates) Abdulaziz Mohamed	(United Arab Emirates) Sharjah	18	22	0.81
16	1994–95	(Sudan) Omar El Alamein	(Oman) Al Nasr	30	22	1.15
17	1995–96	(Nigeria) Ricky Owubokiri	(Qatar) Al Arabi	16	22	0.72
18	1996–97	(Morocco) Ahmed Bahja	(Saudi Arabia) Al Ittihad	25	25	1.00
19	1997–98	(Kuwait) Ali Marwi	(Kuwait) Al Salmiya	29	26	1.11
20	1998–99	(Saudi Arabia) Obeid Al-Dosari	(Saudi Arabia) Al Wehda	20	22	0.90
21	1999–00	(Saudi Arabia) Hamzah Idris	(Saudi Arabia) Al Ittihad	33	25	1.32
22	2000–01	(Jordan) Jeris Tadrus	(Jordan) Al Faisaly	24	18	1.33
23	2001–02	(Bahrain) Mohamed Jaffar	(Bahrain) Al Muharraq	25	17	1.47
24	2002–03	(Jordan) Mahmoud Shelbaieh	(Jordan) Al Wehdat	22	18	1.22
25	2003–04	(Argentina) Gabriel Batistuta	(Qatar) Al Arabi	25	18	1.38
26	2004–05	(Lebanon) Mohammad Kassas	(Lebanon) Nejmeh	20	20	1.00
27	2005–06	(Kuwait) Hamad Al Harbi	(Kuwait) Al Salmiya	23	22	1.04
28	2006–07	(Brazil) Rico	(Bahrain) Al Muharraq	25	22	1.13
29	2007–08	(Nigeria) Jaycee John	(Bahrain) Al Muharraq	25	22	1.13
30	2008–09	(Brazil) Fernando Baiano	(United Arab Emirates) Al Jazira	25	22	1.13
31	2009–10	(Argentina) José Sand	(United Arab Emirates) Al Ain	24	22	1.09
32	2010–11	(Senegal) André Senghor	(United Arab Emirates) Baniyas	18	22	0.81
33	2011–12	(Ghana) Asamoah Gyan	(United Arab Emirates) Al Ain	22	22	1.00
34	2012–13	(Ghana) Asamoah Gyan	(United Arab Emirates) Al Ain	31	26	1.19
35	2013–14	(Ghana) Asamoah Gyan	(United Arab Emirates) Al Ain	29	26	1.11
36	2014–15	(Syria) Omar Al-Soma	(Saudi Arabia) Al Ahli	22	22	1.00
37	2015–16	(Syria) Omar Al-Soma	(Saudi Arabia) Al Ahli	27	26	1.03
42	2020–21	(Sudan) Mohamed Abdelrahman	(Sudan) Al Hilal	29	30	0.97
45	2023–24	(Portugal) Cristiano Ronaldo	(Saudi Arabia) Al Nassr	35	31	1.12
46	2024–25	(Portugal) Cristiano Ronaldo	(Saudi Arabia) Al Nassr	25	30	0.83

== Statistics ==
=== Top Players win ===
Player	Club	Golden Boot	Silver Boot	Bronze Boot
(Ghana) Asamoah Gyan	(United Arab Emirates) Al Ain	3	-	-
(Saudi Arabia) Majed Abdullah	(Saudi Arabia) Al Nassr	2	1	-
(Qatar) Mansour Muftah	(Qatar) Al Rayyan	2	1	-
(Portugal) Cristiano Ronaldo	(Saudi Arabia) Al Nassr	2	-	-

=== Top Clubs win ===
Clubs	Years	Golden Boot	Silver Boot	Foreign players
(United Arab Emirates) Al Ain	83,93,10,12,13	5	-	2
(Saudi Arabia) Al Nassr FC	81,89,2024,2025	4	1	1
(Saudi Arabia) Al Ittihad	87,97,00	3	-	1
(Qatar) Al Arabi	93,96,04	3	-	2
(Bahrain) Al Muharraq	02,07,08	3	-	3
(Qatar) Al Rayyan	82,86	2	1	-
(United Arab Emirates) Al Wasl	83,88	2	-	-
(Oman) Al Nassr	88,95	2	-	2
(Kuwait) Al Salmiya	98,06	2	-	-

=== Top Nationality win ===
Nationality	Years	Golden Boot	Silver Boot	Participation
Saudi Arabia	81,87,89,90,91,99,00	7	1	2
United Arab Emirates	83,88,93,94	5	-	3
Kuwait	80,84,92,98,06	4	-	-
Qatar	82,86,93	3	1	1
(Kuwait) Jordan	90,01,03	3	-	1
Ghana	12,13,14	3	-	-
Oman	85,87	2	-	1
Portugal	2024, 2025	2		
Argentina	04,10	2	-	-
Nigeria	96,08	2	-	-
Brazil	07,09	2	-	-

=== Top Leagues win ===
Leagues	Years	Golden Boot	Silver Boot	Foreign players
(Saudi Arabia) Saudi Professional League	81,87,89,90,91,97,99,00,2024,2025	10	1	2
(United Arab Emirates) Arabian Gulf League	83/2,88,93,94,09,10,11,12,13	10	-	5
Qatar Stars League	82,86,93,96,04	5	1	2
Kuwait premier league	80,84,98,06	4	-	-
Oman Mobile League	85,87,88,95	4	-	2
Jordan Manasir Pro League	90,01,03	3	-	-
(Bahrain) Bahraini VIVA League	02,07,08	3	-	2
