= Kenneth Zeigbo =

Nigerian footballer

Personal information
- Date of birth: 16 June 1977 (age 49)
- Place of birth: Enugu, Nigeria
- Height: 1.86 m (6 ft 1 in)
- Position: Striker

Senior career*
Years	Team	Apps	(Gls)
1995–1996	NEPA Lagos	63	(47)
1997	Enugu Rangers	8	(6)
1997–1998	Legia Warsaw	20	(5)
1998–2003	Venezia	5	(0)
1999–2000	→ Al Ain (loan)	22	(13)
2000–2001	→ Al Ahli (loan)	15	(15)
2001–2002	→ L'Aquila (loan)	11	(2)
2003–2005	Belluno	13	(0)
2005–2006	Prix Camisano		
2007–2010	Villasimius		
2010–2012	Castiadas		
2012	Gaeta		
2012–2013	Civitavecchia		

International career
1997–1999	Nigeria	3	(1)
- * Club domestic league appearances and goals

Kenneth Zeigbo (born 16 June 1977) is a Nigerian former professional footballer who played as a striker.

== Career ==
Zeigbo started his career playing with Nigerian teams NEPA Lagos and then Enugu Rangers. On 7 August 1997, he made his debut for the Nigeria national team in a match against Cameroon, also scoring a goal during the game. He then moved to Europe, joining Legia Warsaw and immediately scoring a winning goal in his debut, a Polish Super Cup match against Widzew Łódź.

Zeigbo was then noticed by Venezia scouts and signed by the arancioneroverdi, then playing in Serie A, in 1998. He failed to break into the first team and was immediately relegated into the reserves and successively loaned out to United Arab Emirates side Al Ain, Libyan club Al-Ahly and Serie C1 team L'Aquila. In 2002, he returned to Venezia, only marking three appearances as a substitute before being sold to Serie C2 side Belluno in January 2003. After two difficult seasons and a number of serious injuries, Zeigbo left professional football and moved to Eccellenza Veneto amateurs Prix Camisano in 2005, leaving them in 2007 to sign for Eccellenza Sardinia side A.S.D. Villasimius, joining former Internazionale and Cagliari player Fabio Macellari.

After retiring as a player he became an owner of a security company in Italy.

== Honours ==
Legia Warsaw

- Polish Super Cup: 1997

Al Ain

- UAE Pro League: 1999–2000
