= 2000–01 UAE Football League =

UAE Football League
- Season: 2000–01
- Champions: Al Wahda
- Relegated: Sharjah; Al Ahly (Fujairah)
- Asian Club Championship: Al Wahda
- Matches: 132
- Goals: 436 (3.3 per match)
- Top goalscorer: Mohammed Salem Al-Enazi (22 goals)

Statistics of UAE Football League for the 2000–01 season.

== Overview ==
It was contested by 12 teams, and Al Wahda won the league.

== Personnel ==
Team	Head coach
Al Ahli (Dubai)	
Al Ahly (Fujairah)	
Al Ain	(Romania) Anghel Iordănescu
Al Jazira	
Al-Nasr	(Czech Republic) Milan Máčala
Al-Shaab	(Federal Republic of Yugoslavia) Dragan Gugleta
Al Shabab	(Slovakia) Dušan Radolský
Al Wahda	(Netherlands) Rinus Israël
Al Wasl	(Austria) Josef Hickersberger
Emirates	
Ittihad Kalba	
Sharjah	(Tunisia) Faouzi Benzarti

== Foreign players ==
Club	Player 1	Player 2	Former players
Al Ahli (Dubai)	(Morocco) Abdellatif Jrindou	(Morocco) Rachid Benmahmoud	
Al Ahly (Fujairah)	(Morocco) Mouloud Moudakkar		
Al Ain	(Burundi) Juma Mossi	(Nigeria) Emmanuel Ebiede	(Argentina) Sergio Berti
Al Jazira	(Ivory Coast) Charles Dago	(Ivory Coast) Joël Tiéhi	(Nigeria) Emmanuel Ebiede
Al-Nasr	(Iran) Khodadad Azizi	(Togo) Chérif Touré Mamam	(Brazil) Sérgio Ricardo
Al-Shaab	(Morocco) Reda Ereyahi	(Netherlands) Geert Brusselers	
Al Shabab	(Brazil) Denílson	(Ghana) Baba Adamu	
Al Wahda	(Qatar) Mohammed Salem Al-Enazi	(Sierra Leone) Lamin Conteh	(Senegal) Alboury Lah
Al Wasl	(Iran) Farhad Majidi	(Morocco) Rachid Daoudi	
Emirates	(Morocco) Mustapha Moustawdae		
Ittihad Kalba	(Iraq) Qahtan Chathir		
Sharjah	(Iraq) Razzaq Farhan	(Tunisia) Mourad Chebbi	(Germany) Michael Müller

== League standings ==
Pos	Team	Pld	W	D	L	GF	GA	GD	Pts
1	Al Wahda	22	15	5	2	62	34	+28	50
2	Al Ahli (Dubai)	22	13	3	6	47	36	+11	42
3	Al Jazira	22	11	5	6	47	33	+14	38
4	Al Ain	22	10	4	8	33	27	+6	34
5	Al Wasl	22	9	5	8	42	32	+10	32
6	Al-Shaab	22	8	8	6	32	26	+6	32
7	Al-Nasr	22	8	7	7	40	41	−1	31
8	Al Shabab	22	7	8	7	33	36	−3	29
9	Ittihad Kalba	22	8	4	10	29	39	−10	28
10	Emirates	22	5	7	10	29	38	−9	22
11	Sharjah	22	6	4	12	27	38	−11	22
12	Al Ahly (Fujairah)	22	2	0	20	15	56	−41	6

Source: rsssf.org

== Goalscorers ==
22 goals

- (Qatar) Mohammed Salem Al-Enazi (Al Wahda)

14 goals

- (Ghana) Baba Adamu (Al Shabab)
- (Iran) Farhad Majidi (Al Wasl)
- (Morocco) Rachid Benmahmoud (Al Ahli (Dubai))

13 goals

- (Ivory Coast) Joël Tiéhi (Al Jazira)
