= Nelsinho Rosa =

Brazilian footballer and manager (1937–2023)

Personal information
- Full name: Nélson Rosa Martins
- Date of birth: 8 December 1937
- Place of birth: Rio de Janeiro, Brazil
- Date of death: 16 May 2023 (aged 85)
- Place of death: Rio de Janeiro, Brazil
- Height: 1.77 m (5 ft 10 in)
- Position: Midfielder

Youth career
- 1951–1957: Madureira

Senior career*
Years	Team	Apps	(Gls)
1957–1962	Madureira		
1962–1968	Flamengo		

Managerial career
- 1977: Desportiva Ferroviária
- 1980–1981: Fluminense
- 1982–1984: Al Ain
- 1985–1986: Fluminense
- 1989: Vasco da Gama
- 1992: Vasco da Gama
- 1992: Saudi Arabia
- 1993: Fluminense
- 1995: Vasco da Gama
- 2002: Madureira
Medal record
Men's football
Representing Saudi Arabia (as manager)
AFC Asian Cup
Runner-up	1992
- * Club domestic league appearances and goals

Nélson Rosa Martins (8 December 1937 – 16 May 2023), known as Nelsinho Rosa, was a Brazilian football coach and player who played as a midfielder.

== Career ==
Born in Rio de Janeiro, Rosa made his senior debut with Madureira before joining Flamengo in 1962. He retired in 1968, aged 31.

After retiring, Rosa worked as an assistant before being named manager of Desportiva Ferroviária in 1977. In 1980, he was appointed manager of Fluminense, leaving the club in the following year.

Rosa returned to Flu in 1985, leaving in the following year. In 1989, he took over Vasco da Gama, and led the side to a 1989 Série A winning campaign.

Rosa returned to Vasco in 1992, before moving abroad to take over the Saudi Arabia national team. He worked at the side in the 1992 King Fahd Cup and the 1992 AFC Asian Cup, before returning to his home country in 1993 to work at Fluminense for a third spell.

In 2002, Rosa was also a manager of first club Madureira for a brief period. In 2011, he returned to the side to work as a football consultant.

Rosa died on 16 May 2023, at the age of 85.

== Honours ==
=== Player ===
Flamengo

- Campeonato Carioca: 1963, 1965

=== Manager ===
Desportiva Ferroviária

- Campeonato Capixaba: 1977

Fluminense

- Campeonato Carioca: 1980, 1985

Al Ain

- UAE Joint League: 1982–83
- UAE Football League: 1983–84

Vasco da Gama

- Campeonato Brasileiro Série A: 1989
