= Mohammad Omar (footballer, born 1976) =

Emirati footballer

Personal information
- Full name: Mohammed Omar Mohammed Ahmed Al-Shaddadi
- Date of birth: 11 November 1976 (age 49)
- Place of birth: Dubai, United Arab Emirates
- Height: 1.75 m (5 ft 9 in)
- Position: Forward

Team information
- Current team: Mumbai Tigers (Chief Executive Officer)

Senior career*
Years	Team	Apps	(Gls)
1992–2001	Al Wasl	93	(57)
2002	Dhofar	1	(1)
2002–2005	Al Ain	47	(29)
2005–2007	Al-Jazira	59	(29)
2008	Al-Dhafra	9	(2)
2008–2009	Al-Nasr	21	(13)
2009–2010	Ajman	8	(2)
2010–2011	Al Wasl		
Total		237	(132)

International career^{‡}
1996–2009	UAE	102	(28)
- * Club domestic league appearances and goals as of 17/7/2010 (UTC) ‡ National team caps and goals as of 17/7/2010 (UTC)

Mohammed Omar Mohammed Ahmed Al-Shaddadi, known as Mohammad Omar (Arabic: محمد عمر, born November 11, 1976, in Dubai, UAE) is a retired Emirati footballer, and the CEO for Mumbai Tigers F.C. in India. He was the captain of the UAE national football team from 2002 to 2008. During his professional football career which spanned over 20 years he has played for many clubs including Al Wasl, Al Ain, Al Jazira, Al Dhafra, Al-Nasr, and Ajman Club. In Summer 2010, Omar announced that he would move back to the club that he started with, Al Wasl FC to play a final season and retire. In 2002, he joined Omani club, Dhofar and competed with them in the final of the Sultan Qaboos Cup, and scored the only goal for the team in a game which they eventually lost to neighbor's, Al-Nasr.

Mohammed Omar is the younger brother of the UAE's football legend Zuhair Bakhit.

== International goals ==
No.	Date	Venue	Opponent	Score	Result	Competition
1.	14 April 2001	Hassanal Bolkiah National Stadium, Bandar Seri Begawan, Brunei	Brunei	2–0	12–0	2002 FIFA World Cup qualification
2.	14 April 2001	Hassanal Bolkiah National Stadium, Bandar Seri Begawan, Brunei	Brunei	5–0	12–0	2002 FIFA World Cup qualification
3.	16 August 2006	Amman International Stadium, Amman, Jordan	Jordan	1–0	2–1	2007 AFC Asian Cup qualification
4.	11 October 2006	Sultan Qaboos Sports Complex, Muscat, Oman	Oman	1–2	1–2	2007 AFC Asian Cup qualification
5.	15 November 2006	Mohammed bin Zayed Stadium, Abu Dhabi, UAE	Pakistan	2–1	3–2	2007 AFC Asian Cup qualification
6.	15 November 2006	Mohammed bin Zayed Stadium, Abu Dhabi, UAE	Pakistan	3–2	3–2	2007 AFC Asian Cup qualification
7.	21 January 2009	KLFA Stadium, Kuala Lumpur, Malaysia	Malaysia	1–0	5–0	2011 AFC Asian Cup qualification
8.	21 January 2009	KLFA Stadium, Kuala Lumpur, Malaysia	Malaysia	2–0	5–0	2011 AFC Asian Cup qualification

== Honors ==
=== Al Wasl FC ===
- UAE League : UAE Football League 1996–97

=== Al Ain FC ===
- UAE League : 2001–02, 2002–03, 2003–04.
- AFC Champions League : 2002–03.
- UAE Super Cup: 2002/2003

=== International ===
- Arabian Gulf Cup : 2007 (Champions).

== See also ==
- List of men's footballers with 100 or more international caps

Sporting positions
Preceded by Zuhair Bakheet	UAE captain 2002–2008	Succeeded by Ismail Matar
