= 2003–04 UAE Football League =

UAE Football League
- Season: 2003–04
- Champions: Al Ain
- AFC Champions League: Al Ain; Al Ahli
- Matches: 72
- Goals: 228 (3.17 per match)
- Top goalscorer: Ali Karimi (14 goals)

Statistics of UAE Football League for the 2003–04 season.

== Overview ==
It was contested by 12 teams, and Al Ain won the championship.

== Personnel ==
Team	Head coach
Al Ahli	(Romania) Ilie Balaci
Al Ain	(France) Bruno Metsu
Al Jazira	(Netherlands) André Wetzel
Al Khaleej	(Spain) Juan Pedro Benali
Al-Nasr	(Romania) Mircea Rednic
Al-Shaab	(Serbia and Montenegro) Zoran Filipović
Al Shabab	(Germany) Reiner Hollmann
Al Wahda	(Netherlands) Rinus Israël
Al Wasl	(Brazil) Arthur Bernardes
Emirates	
Ittihad Kalba	
Sharjah	(United Arab Emirates) Juma Rabea

== Foreign players ==
Club	Player 1	Player 2	Player 3	Player 4	Former players
Al Ahli	(Bosnia and Herzegovina) Slaviša Mitrović	(Iran) Ali Karimi			(Chile) Patricio Almendra
Al Ain	(Brazil) Rodrigo Mendes	(Cameroon) Nicolas Alnoudji	(France) Kodjo Afanou	(Ivory Coast) Boubacar Sanogo	(Sweden) Christer Fursth
Al Jazira	(Colombia) Elson Becerra	(Liberia) Kelvin Sebwe	(Mozambique) Dário Monteiro		
Al Khaleej	(Brazil) Cláudio Prates	(Brazil) Yan Razera			
Al Nasr	(Cameroon) Daniel Wansi	(France) Samba N'Diaye	(Ghana) Baba Adamu	(Iran) Sattar Hamedani	(Ghana) Nii Lamptey
Al Shaab	(Bahrain) Rashid Al-Dosari	(Iran) Ali Samereh	(Netherlands) Dries Boussatta		
Al Shabab	(Brazil) Cassiano	(Brazil) Fernandes	(Brazil) Geraldo	(Ghana) Arthur Moses	
Al Wahda	(France) Bernard Lambourde	(Morocco) Mohammed Benchrifa	(Qatar) Mohammed Salem Al-Enazi	(Serbia and Montenegro) Rade Bogdanović	(Colombia) Arnulfo Valentierra (Iraq) Younis Mahmoud (Romania) Viorel Moldovan (Senegal) Mbaye Badji
Al Wasl	(Iran) Farhad Majidi	(Nigeria) Emmanuel Ebiede	(Nigeria) Felix Ogbuke		
Emirates	(Argentina) Germán Arangio	(Brazil) Jackson			
Ittihad Kalba	(Colombia) Arnulfo Valentierra				
Sharjah	(Brazil) Anderson Barbosa	(Morocco) Otmane El Assas			

== Group stage ==
=== Group A ===
Pos	Team	Pld	W	D	L	GF	GA	GD	Pts
1	Al Ain	10	6	3	1	17	7	+10	21
2	Al Shabab	10	6	1	3	14	9	+5	19
3	Al Jazira	10	5	3	2	16	10	+6	18
4	Al-Nasr	10	4	0	6	13	17	−4	12
5	Al Khaleej	10	2	2	6	10	20	−10	8
6	Sharjah	10	1	3	6	10	17	−7	6

Source: rsssf.org

=== Group B ===
Pos	Team	Pld	W	D	L	GF	GA	GD	Pts
1	Al Ahli	10	7	0	3	25	14	+11	21
2	Al Wasl	10	6	2	2	18	8	+10	20
3	Al Wahda	10	6	2	2	19	12	+7	20
4	Al-Shaab	10	4	1	5	14	13	+1	13
5	Ittihad Kalba	10	3	1	6	13	20	−7	10
6	Emirates	10	1	0	9	10	32	−22	3

Source: rsssf.org

== Playoff ==
Pos	Team	Pld	W	D	L	GF	GA	GD	Pts
1	Al Ain	6	5	0	1	17	10	+7	15
2	Al Ahli	6	4	1	1	17	12	+5	13
3	Al Shabab	6	2	1	3	11	10	+1	7
4	Al Wasl	6	0	0	6	4	17	−13	0

Source: rsssf.org
