= 1999–2000 UAE Football League =

UAE Football League
- Season: 1999–2000
- Relegated: Baniyas; Al Khaleej
- Asian Club Championship: Al Ain
- Top goalscorer: Alboury Lah (18 goals)

Statistics of UAE Football League for the 1999–2000 season.

== Overview ==
The league was contested by 12 teams, and Al Ain emerged as the champions for the season.

== Personnel ==
Team	Head coach
Al Ahli	(Federal Republic of Yugoslavia) Ivica Todorov
Al Ain	(Romania) Ilie Balaci
Al Jazira	(Slovakia) Ján Pivarník
Al Khaleej	
Al-Nasr	(Germany) Reiner Hollmann
Al-Shaab	(Austria) Josef Hickersberger
Al Shabab	
Al Wahda	(Federal Republic of Yugoslavia) Dimitri Davidović
Al Wasl	(France) Alain Laurier
Baniyas	
Emirates	
Ittihad Kalba	(Croatia) Miloš Hrstić

== Foreign players ==
Club	Player 1	Player 2	Player 3	Former players
Al Ahli	(Morocco) Rachid Benmahmoud	(Nigeria) Anthony Nwaigwe	(Nigeria) Kingsley Obiekwu	
Al Ain	(Argentina) Javier Claut	(Egypt) Hossam Hassan	(Nigeria) Kenneth Zeigbo	(Brazil) Sérgio Ricardo (Ghana) Abedi Pele
Al Jazira	(Ivory Coast) Joël Tiéhi	(Nigeria) Emmanuel Ebiede	(Togo) Chérif Touré Mamam	
Al Khaleej	(Belgium) Abdoulaye Demba	(Tunisia) Mourad Chebbi		
Al-Nasr	(Burundi) Juma Mossi	(Ghana) Felix Aboagye	(Iran) Karim Bagheri	
Al-Shaab				
Al Shabab	(Brazil) Denílson	(Ghana) Baba Adamu	(Sierra Leone) Chernor Mansaray	
Al Wahda	(Bosnia and Herzegovina) Rusmir Cviko	(Senegal) Alboury Lah	(Sierra Leone) Lamin Conteh	
Al Wasl	(Cameroon) Alphonse Tchami	(Morocco) Rachid Daoudi		(Morocco) Ahmed Bahja
Baniyas	(Burkina Faso) Abdoulaye Traoré	(Burkina Faso) Romeo Kambou		
Emirates	(Morocco) Mustapha Khalif			
Ittihad Kalba				

== League standings ==
Pos	Team	Pld	W	D	L	GF	GA	GD	Pts	Qualification
1	Al Ain	22	13	7	2	47	25	+22	47 (Note: 1 bonus point from Federation Cup)	Champion
2	Al-Nasr	22	11	9	2	40	20	+20	46 (Note: 4 bonus points from Federation Cup)	
3	Al Wahda	22	12	6	4	49	27	+22	45 (Note: 3 bonus points from Federation Cup)	
4	Al-Shaab	22	10	8	4	37	27	+10	38	
5	Al Jazira	22	8	10	4	35	29	+6	34	
6	Al Ahli	22	9	5	8	42	28	+14	32	
7	Al Wasl	22	6	7	9	29	33	−4	27 (Note: 2 bonus points from Federation Cup)	
8	Al Shabab	22	5	10	7	28	24	+4	25	
9	Ittihad Kalba	22	5	5	12	19	40	−21	20	
10	Emirates	22	4	6	12	20	40	−20	18	Relegation playoff
11	Baniyas	22	5	3	14	35	56	−21	18	Relegation playoff
12	Al Khaleej	22	4	4	14	21	54	−33	16	Relegated

Source: rsssf.com
