= 1977–78 UAE Football League =

UAE Football League
- Season: 1977-78
- Champions: Al-Nasr SC

Statistics of UAE Football League in season 1977/78.

== Overview ==
Al-Nasr Sports Club won the championship.
