= 1979–80 UAE Football League =

UAE Football League
- Season: 1979-80
- Champions: Al Ahli

Statistics of UAE Football League in season 1979/80.

== Overview ==
Al-Ahli Football Club - Dubai won the championship.

== League standings ==
Pos	Team	Pld	W	D	L	GF	GA	GD	Pts
1	Al Ahli	18	11	3	4	26	11	+15	25
2	Sharjah	18	9	5	4	22	17	+5	23
3	Al Shaab	18	7	9	2	17	12	+5	23
4	Al Shabab	18	8	6	4	23	15	+8	22
5	Oman	18	8	5	5	27	18	+9	21
6	Al Nasr	18	7	5	6	19	13	+6	19
7	Al Wasl	18	6	7	5	25	20	+5	19
8	Al Ain	18	3	6	9	28	40	−12	12
9	Emirates	18	3	5	10	21	36	−15	11
10	Khor Fakkan	18	2	1	15	10	36	−26	5

Source: rsssf.com
