= 1994–95 UAE Football League =

UAE Football League
- Season: 1994-95
- Champions: Al-Shabab
- Matches: 90
- Goals: 214 (2.38 per match)

Statistics of UAE Football League for the 1994–95 season.

== Overview ==
It was contested by 10 teams, and Al-Shabab (United Arab Emirates) won the championship.

== League standings ==
Pos	Team	Pld	W	D	L	GF	GA	GD	Pts
1	Al Shabab	18	12	5	1	26	9	+17	29
2	Al Ain	18	7	9	2	26	15	+11	23
3	Al Wasl	18	6	6	6	25	20	+5	18
4	Al Shaab	18	6	6	6	21	18	+3	18
5	Al Nasr	18	6	6	6	21	24	−3	18
6	Sharjah	18	6	5	7	25	24	+1	17
7	Al Ahli	18	4	8	6	17	24	−7	16
8	Al Khaleej	18	6	3	9	16	23	−7	15
9	Al Wahda	18	4	6	8	21	22	−1	14
10	Al Jazira	18	3	6	9	16	35	−19	12

Source: rsssf.com
