= 1978–79 UAE Football League =

UAE Football League
- Season: 1978-79
- Champions: Al-Nasr SC

Statistics of UAE Football League in season 1978/79.

== Overview ==
Al-Nasr Sports Club won the championship.
