= 1991–92 UAE Football League =

UAE Football League
- Season: 1991-92
- Champions: Al Wasl FC
- Matches: 240
- Goals: 622 (2.59 per match)

Statistics of the UAE Football League for the 1991–92 season.

== Overview ==
It was contested by 16 teams, and Al Wasl FC won the championship.

== League standings ==
Pos	Team	Pld	W	D	L	GF	GA	GD	Pts
1	Al Wasl	30	18	10	2	75	27	+48	46
2	Sharjah	30	19	7	4	63	17	+46	45
3	Baniyas	30	18	8	4	49	16	+33	44
4	Al Shabab	30	15	10	5	57	27	+30	40
5	Al Nasr	30	16	7	7	51	30	+21	39
6	Al Ahli	30	15	7	8	44	28	+16	37
7	Al Ain	30	13	8	9	42	35	+7	34
8	Al Jazira	30	12	8	10	26	43	−17	32
9	Al Wahda	30	11	8	11	38	35	+3	30
10	Al Khaleej	30	8	12	10	26	35	−9	28
11	Emirates	30	9	9	12	28	29	−1	27
12	Kalba	30	10	7	13	36	49	−13	27
13	Al Shaab	30	9	6	15	29	43	−14	24
14	Al Ahly (Fujairah)	30	3	6	21	14	49	−35	12
15	Ras Al Khaimah	30	1	6	23	18	59	−41	8
16	Ajman	30	1	5	24	16	90	−74	7

Source: rsssf.com
