= 1984–85 UAE Football League =

UAE Football League
- Season: 1984-85
- Champions: Al Wasl FC

Statistics of UAE Football League in season 1984/85.

== Overview ==
Al Wasl FC won the championship.
