= Fahad Khamees =

Emirati footballer (born 1962)

Fahad Khamees Mubarak
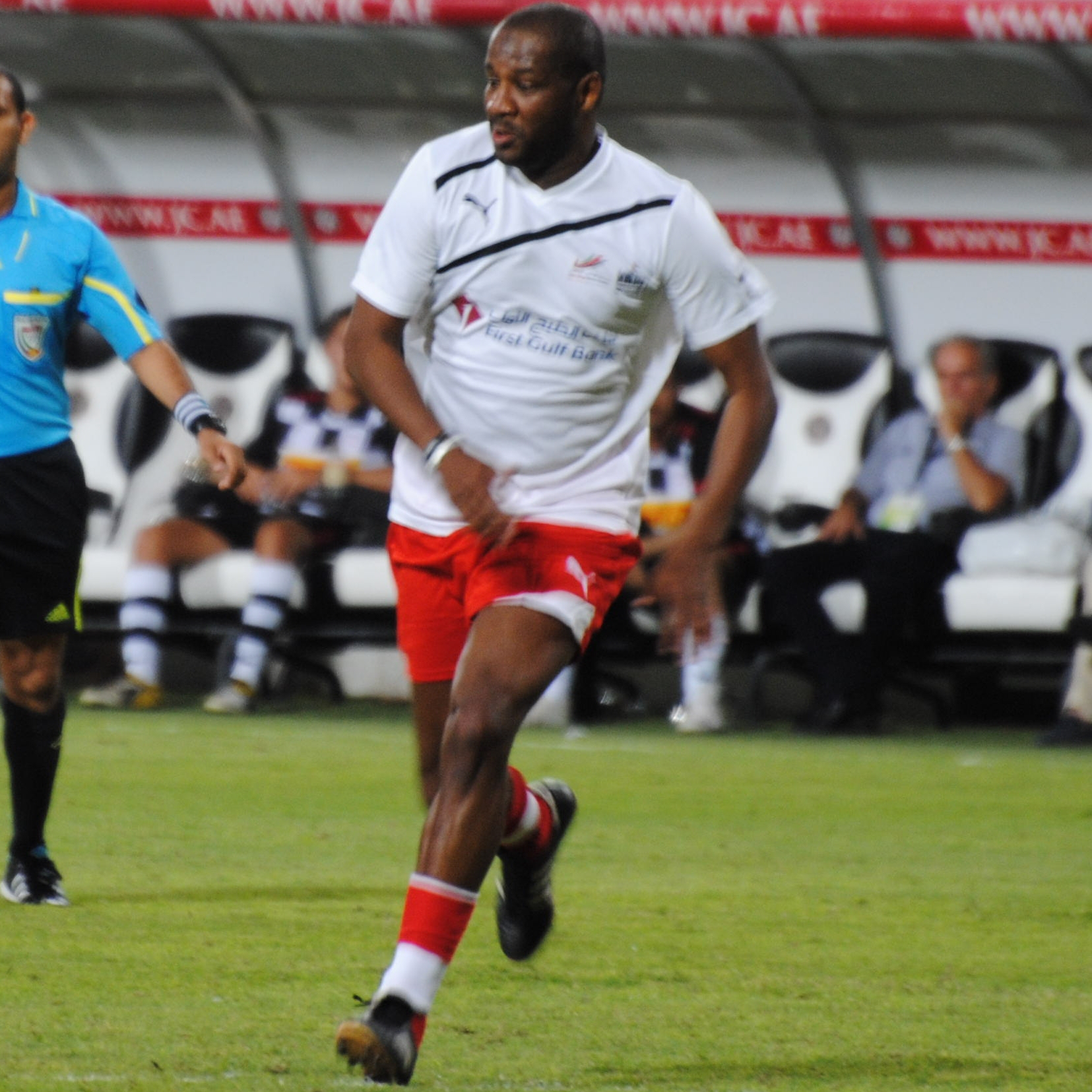

Personal information
- Full name: Fahad Khamees Mubarak
- Date of birth: 24 January 1962 (age 64)
- Place of birth: Dubai, Trucial States
- Height: 1.79 m (5 ft 10 1/2 in)
- Position: Striker

Youth career
- 1975–1977: Al Nasr
- 1977–1980: Al Wasl

Senior career*
Years	Team	Apps	(Gls)
1980–1997	Al Wasl		(175)

International career
1981–1990	United Arab Emirates	68	(28)
- * Club domestic league appearances and goals

Fahad Khamees Mubarak (Arabic: فَهْد خَمِيس مُبَارَك; born 24 January 1962) is an Emirati retired footballer who played as a striker for the UAE national football team and Al Wasl FC in Dubai. He played in the 1990 FIFA World Cup and was the captain of the team in the matches against Colombia and Yugoslavia.

== Club career statistics ==
As of match played 15 April 2023

Club	Season	League			UAE President's Cup		Continental (Note: Includes AFC Champions League(2 goals), GCC Champions League(2 goals))		Other (Note: Includes Joint League (17 goals), UAE Federation Cup(14 goals),UAE Super Cup(5 goals))		Total	
Club	Season	Division	Apps	Goals	Apps	Goals	Apps	Goals	Apps	Goals	Apps	Goals
Al Wasl	1980–81	UPL		2								
Al Wasl	1981–82	UPL		7								
Al Wasl	1982–83	UPL		11								
Al Wasl	1983–84	UPL		20								
Al Wasl	1984–85	UPL		14								
Al Wasl	1985–86	UPL		11		6						
Al Wasl	1986–87	UPL		10								
Al Wasl	1987–88	UPL		18								
Al Wasl	1988–89	UPL		13								
Al Wasl	1989–90	UPL		12								
Al Wasl	1990–91	UPL		10								
Al Wasl	1991–92	UPL		12								
Al Wasl	1992–93	UPL		9				3				
Al Wasl	1993–94	UPL		6				1				
Al Wasl	1994–95	UPL		10								
Al Wasl	1995–96	UPL		6								
Al Wasl	1996–97	UPL		4								
Career total				175		34		4		26		249

== Honours ==
Individual

- GCC Golden Boot: 1982–83
