= 1974–75 UAE Football League =

UAE Football League
- Season: 1974-75
- Champions: Al Ahli
- Matches: 30
- Goals: 112 (3.73 per match)

Statistics of UAE Football League for the 1974–75 season.

== Overview ==
It was contested by 6 teams, and Al Ahli won the championship.

== League standings ==
Pos	Team	Pld	W	D	L	GF	GA	GD	Pts
1	Al Ahli	10	9	0	1	35	8	+27	18
2	Sharjah	10	6	2	2	22	5	+17	14
3	Al Nasr	10	6	1	3	29	9	+20	13
4	Al Wasl	10	2	3	5	11	14	−3	7
5	Oman	10	2	3	5	11	20	−9	7
6	Al Wahda	10	0	1	9	4	56	−52	1

Source: rsssf.com
