= UAE Pro League Committee =

- Abbreviation: PLC
- Formation: February 2007
- Type: Sports association
- Headquarters: Dubai
- Region served: United Arab Emirates
- Members: 20 clubs
- Chairman: Tariq Bin Humaid Al Tayer
- Vice Chairman: Matar Rashid Al Darmaki
- Website: www.proleague.ae

The UAE Pro League Committee (Arabic: لجنة دوري المحترفين, PLC) is the organizing body of association football leagues of United Arab Emirates.

== History ==
The Pro League Committee was established in February 2007 with a resolution issued by the UAE Football Association General Committee. It was originally initiated by Abdullah Bin Zayed Al Nahyan, Minister of Foreign Affairs, with the aim to set a committee to establish a professional league according to the AFC regulations.

In June 2008, the General Authority of Youth and Sports Welfare officially announced another formation under the name of “UAE Football League (UFL)”. Since the two bodies have the same job profile, the Pro League Committee (PLC) replaced the “UFL” according to the General Authority of Youth and Sports Welfare resolution approved in a meeting attended by all members in June 2011.

The committee receives supervision from the UAE Football Association, it organizes UAE Pro-League, Etisalat Cup, UAE Super Cup and Etisalat Reserve League (competed by the reserve teams of the Pro-league clubs). The PLC has all the commercial rights.

The Pro League Committee has been accused of reviving the Persian Gulf naming dispute by renaming its league to the UAE Arabian Gulf League after a 70 million AED one-year renewable partnership deal with Arabian Gulf Development to be named Official Title Partner. On 12 August 2006, the Iranian league was renamed from the Iran Pro League to the Persian Gulf Cup while in May 2013, the Emirati league was renamed from the UAE Pro-League to The Arabian Gulf League.

== Tournament ==
- UAE Pro-League
- UAE League Cup
- UAE Super Cup
