= 1989–90 UAE Football League =

UAE Football League
- Season: 1989-90
- Champions: Al-Shabab
- Matches: 182
- Goals: 433 (2.38 per match)

Statistics of the UAE Football League for the 1989–90 season.

== Overview ==
It was contested by 14 teams, and Al-Shabab (United Arab Emirates) won the championship.

== League standings ==
Pos	Team	Pld	W	D	L	GF	GA	GD	Pts
1	Al Shabab	26	17	6	3	48	25	+23	40
2	Al Wasl	26	17	6	3	44	13	+31	40
3	Sharjah	26	17	5	4	42	26	+16	39
4	Baniyas	26	12	8	6	40	27	+13	32
5	Al Nasr	26	12	7	7	37	21	+16	31
6	Al Ahli	26	12	4	10	34	26	+8	28
7	Al Ain	26	9	9	8	36	26	+10	27
8	Kalba	26	8	7	11	20	28	−8	23
9	Al Jazira	26	8	6	12	27	31	−4	22
10	Al Khaleej	26	9	4	13	23	30	−7	22
11	Al Wahda	26	7	7	12	25	42	−17	21
12	Ras Al Khaimah	26	4	6	16	18	43	−25	14
13	Al Shaab	26	3	6	17	20	43	−23	12
14	Emirates	26	3	6	17	19	52	−33	12

Source: rsssf.com
