= Ali Msarri =

Emirati footballer (born 1981)

Personal information
- Full name: Ali Msarri Rashid Abdullah Al Dhahri
- Date of birth: 9 October 1981 (age 45)
- Place of birth: Al Ain, UAE
- Height: 1.77 m (5 ft 9 1/2 in)
- Position: Defender

Youth career
- 1993–1998: Al Ain FC

Senior career*
| Years | Team | Apps | (Gls) |
| 1998–2009 | Al Ain | 138 | (5) |
| 2008–2009 | → Al Wasl (loan) | 3 | (0) |
| 2009–2012 | Bani Yas | 22 | (2) |
| 2012–2013 | Al Dhafra | | |
| 2013–2015 | Dubai Club | | |

International career^{‡}
| 2001–2007 | UAE | 41 | (1) |
- * Club domestic league appearances and goals as of 19/9/2012 ‡ National team caps and goals as of 24/12/2009

Ali Msarri Rashid Abdullah Al Dhahri (Arabic: علي مسري راشد عبد الله الظاهري) is a UAE football (soccer) player who plays as a defender for Al Dhafra S.C.C. in the UAE Pro-League.

He was transferred to Al Wasl FC from Al Ain FC during the Winter 2008 transfer window as part of a 6-month loan deal.
