= 1992–93 UAE Football League =

UAE Football League
- Season: 1992-93
- Champions: Al Ain FC
- Matches: 132
- Goals: 379 (2.87 per match)

Statistics of the UAE Football League for the 1992–93 season.

== Overview ==
It was contested by 12 teams, and Al Ain FC won the championship.

== League standings ==
Pos	Team	Pld	W	D	L	GF	GA	GD	Pts
1	Al Ain	22	15	5	2	54	13	+41	35
2	Al Wasl	22	12	3	7	35	25	+10	27
3	Sharjah	22	9	8	5	36	26	+10	26
4	Al Nasr	22	9	6	7	39	33	+6	24
5	Baniyas	22	9	6	7	30	27	+3	24
6	Al Ahli	22	9	6	7	30	28	+2	24
7	Al Shabab	22	8	6	8	38	30	+8	22
8	Al Wahda	22	6	9	7	26	22	+4	21
9	Al Jazira	22	5	11	6	31	29	+2	21
10	Al Khaleej	22	6	8	8	24	30	−6	20
11	Kalba	22	7	3	12	26	41	−15	17
12	Al Urooba	22	1	1	20	10	72	−62	3

Source: rsssf.com
