= 1985–86 UAE Football League =

UAE Football League
- Season: 1985-86
- Champions: Al-Nasr
- Top goalscorer: Mohammed Salem (Al Wahda) (16 goals)

Statistics of UAE Football League in season 1985/86.

== Overview ==
It was contested by 10 teams, and Al-Nasr Sports Club won the championship.

== League standings ==
Pos	Team	Pld	W	D	L	GF	GA	GD	Pts
1	Al Nasr	18	12	3	3	26	13	+13	27
2	Al Wasl	18	12	1	5	37	18	+19	25
3	Sharjah	18	8	7	3	24	18	+6	23
4	Al Ahli	18	9	4	5	25	15	+10	22
5	Al Wahda	18	8	4	6	33	21	+12	20
6	Al Shabab	18	6	6	6	21	15	+6	18
7	Al Shaab	18	5	3	10	20	31	−11	13
8	Al Khaleej	18	4	5	9	14	26	−12	13
9	Al Ain	18	4	2	12	27	47	−20	10
10	Al Jazira	18	3	3	12	12	35	−23	9

Source: rsssf.com
