= 1980–81 UAE Football League =

UAE Football League
- Season: 1980-81
- Champions: Al Ain FC

Statistics of UAE Football League in season 1980/81.

== Overview ==
Al Ain FC won the championship.
