= 1976–77 UAE Football League =

UAE Football League
- Season: 1976-77
- Champions: Al Ain FC

Statistics of UAE Football League in season 1976/77.

== Overview ==
Al Ain FC won the championship.
