= Karim Eddafi =

Moroccan footballer

Karim Eddafi is a Moroccan footballer who plays for Sudanese club El-Merreikh in the Sudan Premier League. He plays as a winger. He was brought to EL-Merreikh from Moroccan side Kentira AC in January 2010.
