= Mbaye Badji =

Senegalese footballer

Personal information
- Full name: El-Hadji Mbaye Badji
- Date of birth: 25 February 1976 (age 50)
- Place of birth: Kaolack, Senegal
- Position: Midfielder

Senior career*
Years	Team	Apps	(Gls)
1999–2000	AS Salé		
2004–2005	Sakaryaspor	3	(0)

International career
2000–2001	Senegal	6	(0)
- * Club domestic league appearances and goals

Mbaye Badji (born 25 February 1976) is a retired Senegalese professional footballer who played as a midfielder. He played for, among others, AS Salé in the Moroccan Botola, Sakaryaspor in the Turkish Super Lig and Al-Wadha in the UAE Pro League.

Badji was part of the Senegal national football team at the 2000 African Cup of Nations, appearing in 3 matches, including the quarter-final loss to Nigeria. Badji also appeared in two qualifying matches for the 2002 FIFA World Cup and a 2002 African Cup of Nations qualifying match.
