= 1996–97 UAE Football League =

UAE Football League
- Season: 23
- Champions: Al Wasl FC
- Matches: 240
- Goals: 290 (1.21 per match)

Statistics of the UAE Football League for the 1996–97 UAE Football League.

== Overview ==
It was contested by 10 teams, and Al Wasl FC won the championship.

== First stage ==
Pos	Team	Pld	W	D	L	GF	GA	GD	Pts
1	Al Wahda	18	11	6	1	28	16	+12	39
2	Al Nasr	18	11	4	3	28	14	+14	37
3	Sharjah	18	9	4	5	25	21	+4	31
4	Al Ain	18	8	6	4	29	19	+10	30
5	Al Shabab	18	7	6	5	20	19	+1	27
6	Al Wasl	18	6	4	8	25	23	+2	22
7	Al Khaleej	18	5	6	7	17	22	−5	21
8	Baniyas	18	5	1	12	17	29	−12	16
9	Kalba	18	4	3	11	13	26	−13	15
10	Al Shaab	18	2	4	12	19	32	−13	10

Source: rsssf.com

== Second stage ==
Pos	Team	Pld	W	D	L	GF	GA	GD	BP	Pts
1	Al Wasl	10	6	1	3	14	7	+7	0	19
2	Al Nasr	10	4	4	2	12	7	+5	0	16
3	Al Wahda	10	4	1	5	12	16	−4	3	16
4	Al Shabab	10	4	2	4	11	11	0	0	14
5	Al Ain	10	2	5	3	11	12	−1	0	11
6	Sharjah	10	3	1	6	9	16	−7	0	10

Source: rsssf.com
