= 2004–05 UAE Football League =

UAE Football League
- Season: 2004–05
- Champions: Al Wahda
- AFC Champions League: Al Wahda; Al Ain
- Matches: 182
- Goals: 627 (3.45 per match)

Statistics of UAE Football League for the 2004–05 season.

== Overview ==
It was contested by 14 teams, and Al Wahda won the championship.

== Foreign players ==
Club	Player 1	Player 2	Player 3	Player 4	Former players
Al Ahli	(Iran) Ali Karimi	(Tunisia) Ali Zitouni			
Al Ain	(Brazil) Edílson	(France) Kodjo Afanou	(Ivory Coast) Boubacar Sanogo	(Oman) Ahmed Kano	(Colombia) Mauricio Molina (Iraq) Hussein Alaa Hussein (Paraguay) Roberto Acuña
Al Dhafra	(Burkina Faso) Romeo Kambou	(Nigeria) Robert Akaruye			
Al Jazira	(Angola) Maurito	(Colombia) Elson Becerra	(Mali) Souleymane Keïta	(Qatar) Mohammed Salem Al-Enazi	(Brazil) Vinícius
Al Khaleej	(Morocco) Rachid Benmahmoud	(Morocco) Saïd Chiba			
Al Nasr	(Brazil) Denílson	(Brazil) Flavio	(Brazil) Valdir Bigode	(Iran) Sattar Hamedani	
Al Shaab	(Iran) Ali Samereh				
Al Shabab	(Brazil) Geraldo	(Brazil) Leo	(Liberia) Arcadia Toe	(Morocco) Saïd Idraoui	(Brazil) Fernandes
Al Wahda	(Bosnia and Herzegovina) Slaviša Mitrović	(Mali) Tenema N'Diaye			(Egypt) Wael El-Quabbani
Al Wasl	(Ecuador) Walter Ayoví	(Iran) Alireza Vahedi Nikbakht	(Iran) Farhad Majidi	(Morocco) Bouchaib El Moubarki	
Dubai	(Algeria) Karim Kerkar	(Cameroon) Patrick Suffo			(Algeria) Brahim Arafat
Emirates	(Argentina) Germán Arangio	(Morocco) Mustapha Hadji			(Brazil) Jackson
Ittihad Kalba	(France) Olivier Boumelaha				
Sharjah	(Brazil) Anderson Barbosa	(France) Samba N'Diaye	(Morocco) Zakaria Aboub		

== League standings ==
Pos	Team	Pld	W	D	L	GF	GA	GD	Pts
1	Al Wahda	26	20	2	4	75	35	+40	62
2	Al Ain	26	18	3	5	54	26	+28	57
3	Al Jazira	26	16	5	5	62	41	+21	53
4	Al Nasr	26	13	7	6	48	33	+15	46
5	Sharjah	26	12	6	8	59	44	+15	42
6	Al Shabab	26	11	7	8	43	44	−1	40
7	Al Ahli	26	11	6	9	58	40	+18	39
8	Al Wasl	26	9	7	10	36	36	0	34
9	Al Shaab	26	10	4	12	37	44	−7	34
10	Emirates	26	7	5	14	26	47	−21	26
11	Dubai	26	6	6	14	30	53	−23	24
12	Al Khaleej	26	5	4	17	36	62	−26	19
13	Ittihad Kalba	26	4	7	15	27	55	−28	19
14	Al Dhafra	26	2	7	17	36	67	−31	13

Source: rsssf.com
