= 1986–87 UAE Football League =

UAE Football League
- Season: 1986-87
- Champions: Sharjah FC

Statistics of UAE Football League in season 1986/87.

== Overview ==
Sharjah FC won the championship.

== League standings ==
| Pos | Team | Pld | W | D | L | GF | GA | GD | Pts |
|---|---|---|---|---|---|---|---|---|---|
| 1 | Sharjah | 20 | 13 | 4 | 3 | 34 | 14 | +20 | 30 |
| 2 | Al Wasl | 20 | 12 | 3 | 5 | 39 | 19 | +20 | 27 |
| 3 | Al Ain | 20 | 11 | 3 | 6 | 32 | 23 | +9 | 25 |
| 4 | Al Nasr | 20 | 9 | 7 | 4 | 30 | 21 | +9 | 25 |
| 5 | Al Khaleej | 20 | 11 | 3 | 6 | 28 | 24 | +4 | 25 |
| 6 | Al Shaab | 20 | 6 | 8 | 6 | 34 | 30 | +4 | 20 |
| 7 | Al Wahda | 20 | 6 | 7 | 7 | 28 | 26 | +2 | 19 |
| 8 | Al Shabab | 20 | 6 | 5 | 9 | 28 | 27 | +1 | 17 |
| 9 | Kalba | 20 | 5 | 5 | 10 | 20 | 31 | −11 | 15 |
| 10 | Al Ahli (Dubai) | 20 | 4 | 5 | 11 | 25 | 36 | −11 | 13 |
| 11 | Al Ahly (Fujairah) | 20 | 0 | 4 | 16 | 11 | 58 | −47 | 4 |

Source: rsssf.com
