= 1982–83 UAE Football League =

UAE Football League
- Season: 1982-83
- Champions: Al Wasl FC

Statistics of UAE Football League in season 1982/83.

== Overview ==
Al Wasl FC won the championship.

== League standings ==
Pos	Team	Pld	W	D	L	GF	GA	GD	Pts
1	Al Wasl	18	11	3	4	32	17	+15	25
2	Al Sharjah	18	7	8	3	20	14	+6	22
3	Al Nasr	18	6	8	4	21	21	0	20
4	Al Ahli	18	6	7	5	22	18	+4	19
5	Al Ain	18	6	7	5	21	21	0	19
6	Al Shabab	18	3	11	4	18	22	−4	17
7	Al Khaleej	18	5	7	6	15	20	−5	17
8	Al Emirates	18	3	8	7	17	20	−3	14
9	Al Shaab	18	4	6	8	18	26	−8	14
10	Al Qadsia	18	3	7	8	14	19	−5	13

Source: rsssf.com
