= 1973–74 UAE Football League =

UAE Football League
- Season: 1973-74
- Champions: Al Orouba

The 1973–74 UAE Football League season was the inaugural trial edition of top-level UAE Football League annual football competition in the United Arab Emirates as established by its governing body before recognition of its games for the official record. 17 sides contested in two stages: in 3 regional groups to determine which would proceed to the final to establish the league champion.

Al-Orouba successfully pursued the challenge out performing the other group finalists (Al Ahli and Oman).

Statistics of UAE Football League for the 1973–74 season.

== First round ==
=== Group 1 ===
- Al Najah
- Al Nasr (Dubai)
- Al Orouba (winners)
- Al Shaab
- Shoala Al Ajmani
- Zamalek

=== Group 2 ===
- Al Ahli (Dubai) (winners)
- Al Hilal (Ajman)
- Al Khaleej
- Al Nasr (Ajman)
- Al Shabab

=== Group 3 ===
- Al Ahly (Fujairah)
- Al Hisn
- Al Rams
- Kalba
- Oman (winners)
- Ras Al Khaimah

== Final ==
Pos	Team	Pld	W	D	L	GF	GA	GD	Pts
1	Al Orouba	2	1	1	0	4	1	+3	3
2	Al Ahli (Dubai)	2	0	2	0	0	0	0	2
3	Oman	2	0	1	1	1	4	−3	1

Source: rsssf.com
