= 1981–82 UAE Football League =

UAE Football League
- Season: 1981-82
- Champions: Al Wasl FC

Statistics of UAE Football League in season 1981/82.

== Overview ==
Al Wasl FC won the championship. They were captained by Danish international Peter Engelsen, 17.
