= 1988–89 UAE Football League =

UAE Football League
- Season: 1988-89
- Champions: Sharjah FC
- Matches: 132
- Goals: 327 (2.48 per match)

Statistics of UAE Football League for the 1988–89 season.

== Overview ==
It was contested by 12 teams, and Sharjah FC won the championship.

== League standings ==
Pos	Team	Pld	W	D	L	GF	GA	GD	Pts
1	Sharjah	22	14	4	4	31	18	+13	32
2	Al Wasl	22	13	5	4	44	18	+26	31
3	Al Nasr	22	12	5	5	38	17	+21	29
4	Al Shabab	22	12	4	6	29	18	+11	28
5	Al Ain	22	8	9	5	29	21	+8	25
6	Al Khaleej	22	9	5	8	31	31	0	23
7	Al Wahda	22	7	8	7	34	30	+4	22
8	Baniyas	22	7	6	9	16	19	−3	20
9	Al Jazira	22	8	3	11	23	29	−6	19
10	Al Shaab	22	6	4	12	20	31	−11	16
11	Al Ahli	22	4	5	13	18	36	−18	13
12	Emirates	22	0	3	19	14	56	−42	3

Source: rsssf.com
