= 10th GCC Club Championship =

1993 GCC Club Championship
Tournament details
- Dates: 30 December 1992 – 8 January 1993
- Teams: 5 (from AFC/UAFA confederations)

Final positions
- Champions: Al Shabab (1st title)
- Runners-up: Al Shabab Al-Arabi

The 10th GCC Club Championship (Arabic: بطولة الأنديـة الخليجية أبطال الدوري) was the tenth edition of the GCC Club Championship for clubs of the Gulf Cooperation Council nations, held in 1993.

The tournament doubled up as the qualifying round of the 1993–94 Asian Club Championship. The winners would progress to the ACC's latter stages.

== Results ==
Fanja SC withdrew before the tournament.

Team	Pts	Pld	W	D	L	GF	GA	GD
(Saudi Arabia) Al-Shabab	8	4	4	0	0	7	0	+7
(United Arab Emirates) Al-Shabab Al-Arabi	6	4	3	0	1	5	2	+3
(Qatar) Al-Arabi	3	4	1	1	2	4	5	−1
(Bahrain) Al-Muharraq SC	3	4	1	1	2	6	9	−3
(Kuwait) Qadsia SC	0	4	0	0	4	4	10	−6

All match were played in Saudi Arabia.

December 30, 1992	Al-Shabab	1–0	Qadsia
December 31, 1992	Al-Shabab Al-Arabi	1–0	Al-Muharraq
January 1, 1993	Al-Arabi	2–1	Qadsia
January 2, 1993	Al-Shabab	1–0	Al-Shabab Al-Arabi
January 3, 1993	Al-Arabi	2–2	Al-Muharraq
January 4, 1993	Al-Shabab Al-Arabi	3–1	Qadsia
January 5, 1993	Al-Shabab	1–0	Al-Arabi
January 6, 1993	Al-Muharraq	4–2	Qadsia
January 7, 1993	Al-Shabab Al-Arabi	1–0	Al-Arabi
January 8, 1993	Al-Shabab	4–0	Al-Muharraq

== Winner ==
GCC Club Championship
1993 Winners

Al-Shabab
1st Title
