= 1983–84 UAE Football League =

UAE Football League
- Season: 1983-84
- Champions: Al Ain FC

Statistics of UAE Football League for the 1983–84 season.

== Overview ==
It was contested by 10 teams, and Al Ain FC won the championship.

== League standings ==
Pos	Team	Pld	W	D	L	GF	GA	GD	Pts
1	Al Ain	18	12	3	3	35	18	+17	27
2	Al Wasl	18	11	3	4	34	18	+16	25
3	Al Ahli	18	9	7	2	23	11	+12	25
4	Al Khaleej	18	6	6	6	20	20	0	18
5	Al Shabab	18	5	7	6	14	14	0	17
6	Al Jazira	18	4	9	5	17	21	−4	17
7	Al Shaab	18	6	4	8	20	25	−5	16
8	Sharjah	18	5	5	8	?	?	—	15 (Note: Results unknown, but likely 5 wins, 5 draws, and 8 losses to result in 15 total points.)
9	Al Nasr	18	4	5	9	9	20	−11	13
10	Emirates	16	0	5	11	7	24	−17	5

Source: rsssf.com
