= Zuhair Bakheet =

Emirati footballer (born 1967)

Personal information
- Full name: Zuhair Saeed Bakheet-Bilal
- Date of birth: 13 July 1967 (age 59)
- Place of birth: Dubai, United Arab Emirates
- Height: 1.73 m (5 ft 8 in)

Senior career*
Years	Team	Apps	(Gls)
1986–2004	Al Wasl		

International career
1988–2002	United Arab Emirates	112	(27)
- * Club domestic league appearances and goals

Zuhair Saeed Bakheet-Bilal (Arabic: زُهَيْر سَعِيد بَخِيت بِلَال, also spelled as Bakhit; born 13 July 1967) is a retired Emirati footballer who played as a striker for the United Arab Emirates national football team and Al Wasl in Dubai. He started playing for the national team in 1988 and retired from international football in 2001. He played in 5 Arabian Gulf Cup, 3 AFC Asian Cup of nations, and the 1990 FIFA World Cup in Italy.

== Personal life ==
Bakheet is the older brother of the UAE's football legend Mohammad Omar.

== See also ==
- List of men's footballers with 100 or more international caps
