= 1995–96 UAE Football League =

UAE Football League
- Season: 1995-96
- Champions: Sharjah FC
- Matches: 123
- Goals: 233 (1.89 per match)

Statistics of UAE Football League for the 1995–96 season.

== Overview ==
It was contested by 10 teams, and Sharjah won the championship.

== First stage ==
Pos	Team	Pld	W	D	L	GF	GA	GD	Pts
1	Sharjah	18	12	3	3	35	17	+18	39
2	Al Wasl	18	10	5	3	30	17	+13	35
3	Al Ain	18	6	7	5	17	11	+6	25
4	Al Nasr	18	6	7	5	15	18	−3	25
5	Al Shabab	18	5	8	5	23	20	+3	23
6	Al Khaleej	18	4	9	5	13	19	−6	21
7	Al Shaab	18	3	10	5	19	20	−1	19
8	Baniyas	18	4	6	8	16	30	−14	18
9	Al Wahda	18	3	8	7	14	20	−6	17
10	Al Ahli	18	1	9	8	16	26	−10	12

== Playoff ==
Pos	Team	Pld	W	D	L	GF	GA	GD	Pts
1	Sharjah	5	4	1	0	7	2	+5	13
2	Al Shabab	5	4	0	1	13	3	+10	12
3	Al Wasl	5	3	1	1	5	2	+3	10
4	Al Ain	5	2	0	3	3	7	−4	6
5	Al Nasr	5	1	0	4	6	11	−5	3
6	Al Khaleej	5	0	0	5	1	10	−9	0

Source: rsssf.com
