= 1997–98 UAE Football League =

UAE Football League
- Season: 1997-98
- Champions: Al Ain FC
- Matches: 90
- Goals: 149 (1.66 per match)

Statistics of UAE Football League for the 1997–98 season.

== Overview ==
It was contested by 10 teams, and Al Ain FC won the championship.

== First stage ==
| Pos | Team | Pld | W | D | L | GF | GA | GD | Pts |
|---|---|---|---|---|---|---|---|---|---|
| 1 | Al Wahda | 18 | 10 | 4 | 4 | 32 | 19 | +13 | 34 |
| 2 | Sharjah | 18 | 8 | 8 | 2 | 40 | 22 | +18 | 32 |
| 3 | Al Ain | 18 | 8 | 5 | 5 | 24 | 17 | +7 | 29 |
| 4 | Al Wasl | 18 | 5 | 12 | 1 | 23 | 17 | +6 | 27 |
| 5 | Al Jazira | 18 | 7 | 4 | 7 | 20 | 22 | −2 | 25 |
| 6 | Al Nasr | 18 | 5 | 8 | 5 | 22 | 17 | +5 | 23 |
| 7 | Al Shabab | 18 | 6 | 5 | 7 | 28 | 29 | −1 | 23 |
| 8 | Al Ahli | 18 | 7 | 2 | 9 | 25 | 27 | −2 | 23 |
| 9 | Kalba | 18 | 3 | 8 | 7 | 12 | 29 | −17 | 17 |
| 10 | Baniyas | 18 | 2 | 2 | 14 | 13 | 40 | −27 | 8 |

Source: rsssf.com

== Second stage ==
| Pos | Team | Pld | W | D | L | GF | GA | GD | BP | Pts |
|---|---|---|---|---|---|---|---|---|---|---|
| 1 | Al Ain (C) | 14 | 9 | 4 | 1 | 25 | 12 | +13 | 1 | 32 |
| 2 | Sharjah | 14 | 8 | 4 | 2 | 29 | 15 | +14 | 2 | 30 |
| 3 | Al Wasl | 14 | 6 | 5 | 3 | 16 | 12 | +4 | 0 | 23 |
| 4 | Al Ahli | 14 | 5 | 3 | 6 | 21 | 22 | −1 | 0 | 18 |
| 5 | Al Wahda | 14 | 3 | 6 | 5 | 14 | 18 | −4 | 3 | 18 |
| 6 | Al Nasr | 14 | 4 | 5 | 5 | 15 | 14 | +1 | 0 | 17 |
| 7 | Al Shabab | 14 | 3 | 3 | 8 | 14 | 25 | −11 | 0 | 12 |
| 8 | Al Jazira | 14 | 2 | 2 | 10 | 15 | 31 | −16 | 0 | 8 |

Source: rsssf.com
(C) Champions
