= 1993–94 UAE Football League =

UAE Football League
- Season: 1993-94
- Champions: Sharjah FC
- Matches: 90
- Goals: 234 (2.6 per match)

Statistics of UAE Football League for the 1993–94 season.

== Overview ==
It was contested by 10 teams, and Sharjah FC won the championship.

== League standings ==
Pos	Team	Pld	W	D	L	GF	GA	GD	Pts
1	Sharjah	18	12	5	1	34	11	+23	29
2	Al Ain	18	12	5	1	31	10	+21	29
3	Al Nasr	18	9	5	4	25	20	+5	23
4	Al Wasl	18	7	7	4	28	16	+12	21
5	Al Ahli	18	7	5	6	28	18	+10	19
6	Al Wahda	18	4	7	7	13	21	−8	15
7	Al Shabab	18	3	7	8	21	33	−12	13
8	Al Jazira	18	4	3	11	21	36	−15	11
9	Al Shaab	18	3	5	10	18	34	−16	11
10	Baniyas	18	3	3	12	15	35	−20	9

Source: rsssf.com
