= Samba N'Diaye =

Footballer (born 1972)

Personal information
- Full name: Samba N'Diaye
- Date of birth: 30 November 1972 (age 53)
- Place of birth: Dakar, Senegal
- Height: 1.77 m (5 ft 10 in)
- Position: Striker

Senior career*
Years	Team	Apps	(Gls)
1988–1990	Anderlecht	0	(0)
1990–1991	Metz B	22	(17)
1991–1992	Beauvais	16	(5)
1992–1993	Lille	22	(4)
1993–1996	Metz	64	(6)
1996–1997	Saint-Étienne	41	(19)
1997–1999	Nantes	29	(5)
1999	Saint-Étienne	6	(0)
1999	Nantes	0	(0)
1999–2000	Amiens	11	(4)
2000–2001	Chamois Niortais	32	(11)
2001–2003	Ajaccio	33	(5)
2003–2004	Al-Nasr	24	(28)
2005–2006	Al-Shamal	?	(18)

International career
1993	France U21	1	(0)
- * Club domestic league appearances and goals

Samba N'Diaye (born 30 November 1972) is a former professional footballer who played as a striker. Born in Senegal, he was a youth international for France.

== Personal life ==
N'Diaye is the father of footballer Junior Ndiaye.
