= Emmanuel Ebiede =

Nigerian professional footballer (1978–2023)

Personal information
- Date of birth: 27 March 1978
- Place of birth: Port Harcourt, Rivers State, Nigeria
- Date of death: 14 April 2023 (aged 45)
- Place of death: Port Harcourt, Rivers State, Nigeria
- Height: 1.85 m (6 ft 1 in)
- Position: Attacking midfielder

Senior career*
Years	Team	Apps	(Gls)
1994–1995	Sharks		
1995–1997	Eendracht Aalst	34	(4)
1997–1999	SC Heerenveen	36	(2)
1999–2001	Al Jazira		
2001–2002	Al Ain		
2002	Al Dhafra		
2003–2004	Al-Wasl		
2004–2006	Ashdod	64	(13)
2006–2007	Maccabi Petah Tikva	3	(0)
2007–2008	Hapoel Bnei Lod	18	(3)

International career
1998	Nigeria	3	(0)
- * Club domestic league appearances and goals

Emmanuel Ebiede (27 March 1978 – 14 April 2023) was a Nigerian professional footballer who played as an attacking midfielder.

== Career ==
Ebiede joined Belgian First Division side SC Eendracht Aalst at the age of 16.

In 1997, he moved to SC Heerenveen of the Dutch Eredivisie.

== Death ==
Ebiede died on 14 April 2023, at the age of 45. He suffered from an enlarged liver.
