= UAE Pro League =

Top division in Emirati football

- Organising body: Pro League Committee
- Founded: 1973; 53 years ago
- Country: United Arab Emirates (UAE FA)
- Confederation: AFC (Asia)
- Number of clubs: 14
- Level on pyramid: 1
- Relegation to: First Division League
- Domestic cup(s): UAE President's Cup; UAE Super Cup; UAE FA Cup
- League cup: UAE League Cup
- International cup(s): AFC Champions League Elite; AFC Champions League Two
- Current champions: Al Ain (15th title) (2025–26)
- Most championships: Al Ain (15 titles)
- Top scorer: Ali Mabkhout (226 goals)
- Broadcasters: Abu Dhabi Sports; Dubai Sports; Sharjah Sports; Majid Sports
- Website: uaeproleague.ae
- Current: 2026–27 UAE Pro League

The UAE Pro League (Arabic: دوري المحترفين الإماراتي), also known as the ADNOC Pro League for sponsorship reasons, is a professional association football league in the United Arab Emirates (UAE) and the highest level of the Emirati football league system.

The first team to win the title was Al Orouba (Sharjah), whilst Al Ain has the record with 15 league titles to their name. Fourteen clubs compete in the league that operates on a system of promotion and relegation with the First Division League.

The League was founded in 1973 as the UAE Football League. The first 1973–74 season was a "trial" championship but was declared official by the UAE FA in 2001. In February 2007, the Pro League Committee was formed, and became the organising body of the league.

== Name change ==
Starting from the 2006–07 season the name was changed from UAE League to Etisalat League. And since the 2013–14 season, the name was changed from Etisalat Pro League to Arabian Gulf League, which was named after the Arabian Gulf as per the chairman of Pro League Committee. However, the name change has been viewed as a revival of the Persian Gulf naming dispute with Iran accusing the United Arab Emirates of bigotry, and the Iranian Football Federation barring the transfer of Javad Nekounam to a UAE club. After about four months of the name change a 70 million AED one-year renewable partnership deal was announced with Arabian Gulf Development to be named Official Title Partner. On 8 August, the Pro League signed a new partnership deal with ADNOC worth 80 million AED, from the start of the 2021–22 season, the league was renamed to the UAE's ADNOC Pro League.

== Ranking ==
As of 26 May 2024

| Ranking | | | | Member association (L: League, C: Cup, LC: League cup) | Club points | | | | | | | | Total | 2025–26 Competition | | |
| 2023–24 | 2022 | Mvmt | Region | Member association (L: League, C: Cup, LC: League cup) | 2015 (×0.3) | 2016 (×0.4) | 2017 (×0.5) | 2018 (×0.6) | 2019 (×0.7) | 2021 (×0.8) | 2022 (×0.9) | 2023–24 (×1.0) | Total | ACL Elite | ACL Two | Challenge |
|---|---|---|---|---|---|---|---|---|---|---|---|---|---|---|---|---|
| 1 | 1 | — | W 1 | Saudi Arabia (L, C) | 15.250 | 9.500 | 18.600 | 10.000 | 26.350 | 20.950 | 19.075 | 27.100 | 103.148 | 3+0 | 1+0 | 0 |
| 2 | 2 | — | E 1 | Japan (L, C, LC) | 15.250 | 10.500 | 21.850 | 13.850 | 21.800 | 17.875 | 20.088 | 21.350 | 96.999 | 3+0 | 1+0 | 0 |
| 3 | 3 | — | E 2 | South Korea (L, C) | 16.750 | 20.750 | 9.950 | 18.350 | 13.600 | 22.750 | 15.800 | 22.350 | 93.600 | 2+1 | 1+0 | 0 |
| 4 | 6 | ▲ +2 | W 2 | (United Arab Emirates) United Arab Emirates (L, C) | 25.000 | 18.000 | 11.350 | 8.100 | 7.633 | 14.400 | 8.083 | 24.000 | 73.373 | 2+1 | 1+0 | 0 |

== Clubs ==
=== Member clubs (2025–26) ===
Note: Table lists clubs in alphabetical order.

| Club | Home city | Stadium | Capacity |
|---|---|---|---|
| Ajman | Ajman | Ajman Stadium | 5,537 |
| Al Ain | Al-Ain | Hazza Bin Zayed Stadium | 22,965 |
| Al Bataeh | Al Bataeh | Al Bataeh Stadium | 2,000 |
| Al Dhafra | Madinat Zayed | Al Dhafra Stadium | 5,020 |
| Al Jazira | Abu Dhabi (Al Nahyan) | Mohammad Bin Zayed Stadium | 42,056 |
| Al Nasr | Dubai (Oud Metha) | Al-Maktoum Stadium | 15,058 |
| Al Wahda | Abu Dhabi (Al Nahyan) | Al Nahyan Stadium | 12,201 |
| Al Wasl | Dubai (Zabeel) | Zabeel Stadium | 8,439 |
| Baniyas | Abu Dhabi (Al Shamkha) | Baniyas Stadium | 10,000 |
| Dibba Al Fujairah | Dibba Al Fujairah | Dibba New Stadium | 9,000 |
| Kalba | Kalba | Ittihad Kalba Stadium | 8,500 |
| Khor Fakkan | Khor Fakkan | Saqr bin Mohammad al Qassimi Stadium | 7,500 |
| Shabab Al Ahli | Dubai (Deira) | Rashid Stadium | 12,052 |
| Sharjah | Sharjah | Sharjah Stadium | 20,000 |

Prior to UAE League's transition to the professional era in 2008, many clubs have competed in the country's top tier division from 1973–74 to 2007–08. The below list is clubs that have competed in the UAE top-tier league since the Pro League era starting in 2008–09.

=== Seasons in Pro League ===
- **16** seasons: **Al Ain**, **Al Jazira**, **Al Nasr**, **Al Wahda**, **Al Wasl**
- **15** seasons: **Sharjah**
- **14** seasons: **Baniyas**
- **13** seasons: **Ajman**, Al Dhafra
- **10** seasons: Emirates, **Kalba**
- **9** seasons: Al Ahli, Al Shabab
- **7** seasons: **Shabab Al Ahli**
- **6** seasons: Dibba Al Fujairah, **Khor Fakkan**
- **4** seasons: Al Shaab, Dubai, Fujairah, Hatta
- **3** seasons: **Al Bataeh**
- **2** seasons: **Al Urooba**
- **1** season: **Dibba Al Hisn**

Notes:

- Italtics indicates that the club no longer exists
- **Bold** indicates that the club is still competing in the UAE Pro League as of 2024–25

== Managers ==
| Nat. | Name | Club | Appointed | Time in charge |
|---|---|---|---|---|
| (Portugal) | Paulo Sousa | Shabab Al-Ahli | 30 June 2024 | 2 years, 137 days |
| (Serbia) | Goran Tufegdžić | Ajman | 1 July 2024 | 2 years, 136 days |
| (Serbia) | Vuk Rašović | Kalba | 1 July 2024 | 2 years, 136 days |
| (Iran) | Farhad Majidi | Al Bataeh | 13 January 2025 | 1 year, 305 days |
| (Serbia) | Vladimir Ivić | Al Ain | 4 February 2025 | 1 year, 283 days |
| (Serbia) | Slaviša Jokanović | Al Nasr | 8 June 2025 | 1 year, 159 days |
| (Portugal) | José Morais | Al Wahda | 20 June 2025 | 1 year, 147 days |
| (United Arab Emirates) | Hassan Al Abdooli | Khor Fakkan | 30 June 2025 | 1 year, 137 days |
| (Montenegro) | Željko Petrović | Al Dhafra | 1 July 2025 | 1 year, 136 days |
| (Croatia) | Marino Pušić | Al Jazira | 9 September 2025 | 1 year, 66 days |
| (Romania) | Daniel Isăilă | Baniyas | 20 September 2025 | 1 year, 55 days |
| (Romania) | Ciprian Panait | Dibba | 28 October 2025 | 1 year, 17 days |
| (Sweden) | Mesut Meral | Al Wasl | 5 November 2025 | 1 year, 9 days |
| (United Arab Emirates) | Abdulmajid Al Nimer | Sharjah | 17 November 2025 | 362 days |

== List of champions ==
| yas | No | Season | Champion | Runner up |
|---|---|---|---|---|
| | 1 | 1973–74 | Sharjah | Al Ahli |
| | 2 | 1974–75 | Al Ahli | Sharjah |
| | 3 | 1975–76 | Al Ahli | Al Ain |
| | 4 | 1976–77 | Al Ain | Sharjah |
| | 5 | 1977–78 | Al Nasr | Al Ain |
| | 6 | 1978–79 | Al Nasr | Sharjah |
| | 7 | 1979–80 | Al Ahli | Al Shaab |
| | 8 | 1980–81 | Al Ain | Al Nasr |
| | 9 | 1981–82 | Al Wasl | Al Ain |
| | 10 | 1982–83 | Al Wasl | Sharjah |
| | 11 | 1983–84 | Al Ain | Al Wasl |
| | 12 | 1984–85 | Al Wasl | Al Shaab |
| | 13 | 1985–86 | Al Nasr | Al Wasl |
| | 14 | 1986–87 | Sharjah | Al Wasl |
| | 15 | 1987–88 | Al Wasl | Sharjah |
| | 16 | 1988–89 | Sharjah | Al Wasl |
| | 17 | 1989–90 | Al Shabab | Al Wasl |
| × | | 1990–91 | Cancelled^{a} | |
| | 18 | 1991–92 | Al Wasl | Sharjah |
| | 19 | 1992–93 | Al Ain | Al Wasl |
| | 20 | 1993–94 | Sharjah | Al Ain |
| | 21 | 1994–95 | Al Shabab | Al Ain |
| | 22 | 1995–96 | Sharjah | Al Wasl |
| | 23 | 1996–97 | Al Wasl | Al Nasr |
| | 24 | 1997–98 | Al Ain | Sharjah |
| | 25 | 1998–99 | Al Wahda | Al Ain |
| | 26 | 1999–00 | Al Ain | Al Nasr |
| | 27 | 2000–01 | Al Wahda | Al Ahli |
| | 28 | 2001–02 | Al Ain | Al Jazira |
| | 29 | 2002–03 | Al Ain | Al Wahda |
| | 30 | 2003–04 | Al Ain | Al Shabab |
| | 31 | 2004–05 | Al Wahda | Al Ain |
| | 32 | 2005–06 | Al Ahli | Al Wahda |
| | 33 | 2006–07 | Al Wasl | Al Wahda |
| | 34 | 2007–08 | Al Shabab | Al Jazira |
| | 35 | 2008–09 | Al Ahli | Al Jazira |
| | 36 | 2009–10 | Al Wahda | Al Jazira |
| | 37 | 2010–11 | Al Jazira | Baniyas |
| | 38 | 2011–12 | Al Ain | Al Nasr |
| | 39 | 2012–13 | Al Ain | Al Ahli |
| | 40 | 2013–14 | Al Ahli | Al Wahda |
| | 41 | 2014–15 | Al Ain | Al Jazira |
| | 42 | 2015–16 | Al Ahli | Al Ain |
| | 43 | 2016–17 | Al Jazira | Al Wasl |
| | 44 | 2017–18 | Al Ain | Al Wahda |
| | 45 | 2018–19 | Sharjah | Shabab Al Ahli |
| × | | 2019–20 | Cancelled^{b} | |
| | 46 | 2020–21 | Al Jazira | Baniyas |
| | 47 | 2021–22 | Al Ain | Sharjah |
| | 48 | 2022–23 | Shabab Al Ahli | Al Ain |
| | 49 | 2023–24 | Al Wasl | Shabab Al Ahli |
| | 50 | 2024–25 | Shabab Al Ahli | Sharjah |
| | 51 | 2025–26 | Al Ain | Shabab Al Ahli |

_{Notes}

_{1. Competition cancelled due to Gulf War}

_{2. Competition cancelled due to COVID-19 pandemic in the United Arab Emirates}

== Champions ==
=== Performance by club ===
As of 2024, following clubs are officially allowed to wear stars while playing in the League. Each country's usage is unique and in UAE the practice is to award one star for each five titles won. The number in parentheses is for League titles won.

| Club | Won | Runners-up | Winning seasons |
|---|---|---|---|
| Al Ain | 15 | 9 | 1976–77, 1980–81, 1983–84, 1992–93, 1997–98, 1999–00, 2001–02, 2002–03, 2003–04, 2011–12, 2012–13, 2014–15, 2017–18, 2021–22, 2025–26 |
| Shabab Al Ahli | 9 | 6 | 1974–75, 1975–76, 1979–80, 2005–06, 2008–09, 2013–14, 2015–16, 2022–23, 2024–25 |
| Al Wasl | 8 | 8 | 1981–82, 1982–83, 1984–85, 1987–88, 1991–92, 1996–97, 2006–07, 2023–24 |
| Sharjah | 6 | 9 | 1973–74, 1986–87, 1988–89, 1993–94, 1995–96, 2018–19 |
| Al Wahda | 4 | 5 | 1998–99, 2000–01, 2004–05, 2009–10 |
| Al Jazira | 3 | 5 | 2010–11, 2016–17, 2020–21 |
| Al Nasr | 3 | 4 | 1977–78, 1978–79, 1985–86 |
| Al Shabab^{c} | 3 | 1 | 1989–90, 1994–95, 2007–08 |
| Al Shaab^{d} | 0 | 2 | — |
| Baniyas | 0 | 2 | — |

_{Notes}

_{1. Al Shabab and Dubai CSC merged into Al-Ahli to form Shabab Al Ahli in 2017.}

_{2. Al Shaab folded in 2017.}

=== Performance by city ===
| City / Area | Titles | Clubs | Winning seasons |
|---|---|---|---|
| Dubai | 23 | Shabab Al-Ahli | (9): 1974–75, 1975–76, 1979–80, 2005–06, 2008–09, 2013–14, 2015–16, 2022–23, 2024–25 |
| Dubai | 23 | Al Wasl | (8): 1981–82, 1982–83, 1984–85, 1987–88, 1991–92, 1996–97, 2006–07, 2023–24 |
| Dubai | 23 | Al Nasr | (3): 1977–78, 1978–79, 1985–86 |
| Dubai | 23 | Al Shabab | (3): 1989–90, 1994–95, 2007–08 |
| Al Ain | 15 | Al Ain | (15): 1976–77, 1980–81, 1983–84, 1992–93, 1997–98, 1999–00, 2001–02, 2002–03, 2003–04, 2011–12, 2012–13, 2014–15, 2017–18, 2021–22, 2025–26 |
| Abu Dhabi | 7 | Al Wahda | (4): 1998–99, 2000–01, 2004–05, 2009–10 |
| Abu Dhabi | 7 | Al Jazira | (3): 2010–11, 2016–17, 2020–21 |
| Sharjah | 6 | Sharjah | (6): 1973–74, 1986–87, 1988–89, 1993–94, 1995–96, 2018–19 |

=== Performance by emirates ===
| Emirates | Titles | Clubs | Winning seasons |
|---|---|---|---|
| Dubai | 23 | Shabab Al Ahli | (9): 1974–75, 1975–76, 1979–80, 2005–06, 2008–09, 2013–14, 2015–16, 2022–23, 2024–25 |
| Dubai | 23 | Al Wasl | (8): 1981–82, 1982–83, 1984–85, 1987–88, 1991–92, 1996–97, 2006–07, 2023–24 |
| Dubai | 23 | Al Nasr | (3): 1977–78, 1978–79, 1985–86 |
| Dubai | 23 | Al Shabab | (3): 1989–90, 1994–95, 2007–08 |
| Abu Dhabi | 22 | Al Ain | (15): 1976–77, 1980–81, 1983–84, 1992–93, 1997–98, 1999–00, 2001–02, 2002–03, 2003–04, 2011–12, 2012–13, 2014–15, 2017–18, 2021–22, 2021–22 |
| Abu Dhabi | 22 | Al Wahda | (4): 1998–99, 2000–01, 2004–05, 2009–10 |
| Abu Dhabi | 22 | Al Jazira | (3): 2010–11, 2016–17, 2020–21 |
| Sharjah | 6 | Sharjah | (6): 1973–74, 1986–87, 1988–89, 1993–94, 1995–96, 2018–19 |

== Players ==
=== All-time top scorers ===
| Rank | Nat | Name | Club | Years | Goals | Apps |
|---|---|---|---|---|---|---|
| 1 | (United Arab Emirates) | Ali Mabkhout | Al Jazira Al Nasr | 2009– | 226 | 313 |
| 2 | (United Arab Emirates) | Sebastián Tagliabúe | Al Wahda Al Nasr Sharjah | 2013–2024 | 184 | 239 |
| 3 | (United Arab Emirates) | Fahad Khamees | Al Wasl | 1980–1997 | 175 | —N/a |
| 4 | (United Arab Emirates) | Fábio Lima | Al Wasl | 2014– | 170 | 230 |
| 5 | (United Arab Emirates) | Mohammad Omar | Al Wasl Al Ain Al Jazira Al Dhafra Al Nasr Ajman | 1992–2011 | 132 | |
| 6 | (United Arab Emirates) | Adnan Al Talyani | Al Shaab | 1980–1999 | 131 | —N/a |
| 7 | (United Arab Emirates) | Abdulaziz Mohamed | Sharjah | 1980–2003 | 128 | —N/a |
| 8 | (United Arab Emirates) | Ahmed Abdullah | Al Ain | 1978–1995 | 122 | —N/a |
| 9 | (United Arab Emirates) | Youssouf Al-Atiq Hassan | Al Ahli | 1988–2002 | 119 | —N/a |
| 10 | (United Arab Emirates) | Faisal Khalil | Al Ahli Al Wasl Al Shaab | 1999–2013 | 114 | 302 |
| 11 | (Togo) | Kodjo Fo-Doh Laba | Al-Ain | 2019– | 113 | 119 |
| 12 | (Senegal) | Makhete Diop | Al Dhafra Shabab Al Ahli Sharjah | 2011–2018, 2021–2023 | 108 | 180 |
| 13 | (Ghana) | Asamoah Gyan | Al-Ain Al Ahli | 2011–2017 | 101 | 97 |
| 14 | (United Arab Emirates) | Ismail Matar | Al Wahda | 2001–2024 | 101 | 418 |
| 15 | (Brazil) | Anderson Barbosa | Sharjah Al Wasl | 2003–2009 | 99 | 128 |
| 16 | (United Arab Emirates) | Caio Canedo | Al Ain Al Wasl | 2014– | 99 | 218 |
| 17 | (United Arab Emirates) | Ahmed Khalil | Al Ain Shabab Al Ahli Al Bataeh | 2007– | 96 | 273 |
| 18 | (United Arab Emirates) | Ali Thani | Sharjah | —N/a | 93 | —N/a |
| 19 | (United Arab Emirates) | Aissa Sangour | Al Shabab | —N/a | 88 | |
| 20 | (United Arab Emirates) | Zuhair Bakheet | Al Wasl | —N/a | 88 | |
| 21 | (United Arab Emirates) | Saeed Al-Kass | Sharjah Al Wasl | —N/a | 87 | —N/a |
| 22 | (United Arab Emirates) | Majid Al Owais | Al Ain | —N/a | 86 | —N/a |
| 23 | (United Arab Emirates) (Qatar) | Mohammed Salem Al-Enazi | Al Wahda Al Wasl Al Jazira||data-sort-value="" style="background: var(--background-color-interactive, #ececec); color: var(--color-base, inherit); vertical-align: middle; text-align: center; " class="table-na" | —N/a | 83 | —N/a | |
| 24 | (Ivory Coast) | Boris Kabi | data-sort-value="" style="background: var(--background-color-interactive, #ececec); color: var(--color-base, inherit); vertical-align: middle; text-align: center; " class="table-na" | —N/a | 82 | 146 | |
| 25 | (United Arab Emirates) | Nasir Khamees | Al Wasl | —N/a | 82 | —N/a |
| 26 | (United Arab Emirates) (Ivory Coast) | Ibrahim Diaky | Al Ain Al Jazira | —N/a | 80 | —N/a |
| 27 | (United Arab Emirates) | Khalid Ismail | Al Nasr|data-sort-value="" style="background: var(--background-color-interactive, #ececec); color: var(--color-base, inherit); vertical-align: middle; text-align: center; " class="table-na" | —N/a | 75 | —N/a | |
| 28 | (Syria) | Omar Khribin | Al Wahda Al Dhafra Shabab Al Ahli|data-sort-value="" style="background: var(--background-color-interactive, #ececec); color: var(--color-base, inherit); vertical-align: middle; text-align: center; " class="table-na" | —N/a | 75 | 117 | |
| 29 | (Senegal) | André Senghor | data-sort-value="" style="background: var(--background-color-interactive, #ececec); color: var(--color-base, inherit); vertical-align: middle; text-align: center; " class="table-na" | —N/a | 73 | 118 | |
| 30 | (Brazil) | Caio Lucas | Al Ain Sharjah | —N/a | 73 | 169 |

=== Top scorers by season ===
| Season | Player | Club | Goals |
|---|---|---|---|
| 1973–74 | (United Arab Emirates) Saeed Hareb AlFalahi | Al Ahli | |
| 1974–75 | (United Arab Emirates) Suhail Salim | Al Ahli | 14 |
| 1975–76 | (Pakistan) Ali Nawaz Baloch | Emirates | 13 |
| 1976–77 | (Sudan) Alfadel Santo | Al Nasr | 11 |
| 1977–78 | (Tunisia) Mohieddine Habita | Al Ain | 20 |
| 1978–79 | (Morocco) Mostafa Mahrous | Al Ahli | 16 |
| 1979–80 | (United Arab Emirates) Alo Ali Mohamed | Emirates | 14 |
| 1980–81 | (Ghana) Karim Abdul Razak | Emirates | 14 |
| 1981–82 | (United Arab Emirates) Ahmed Abdullah | Al Ain | 13 |
| 1982–83 | (Brazil) Luiz Carlos | Al Nasr | 12 |
| 1983–84 | (United Arab Emirates) Ahmed Abdullah (United Arab Emirates) Fahad Khamees | Al Ain Al Wasl | 20 |
| 1984–85 | (United Arab Emirates) Fahad Khamees (United Arab Emirates) Adnan Al Talyani | Al Wasl Al Shaab | 14 |
| 1985–86 | (United Arab Emirates) Mohammed Salem | Al Wahda | 16 |
| 1986–87 | (United Arab Emirates) Adnan Al Talyani (United Arab Emirates) Khalil Ghanim | Al Shaab Khor Fakkan | 13 |
| 1987–88 | (United Arab Emirates) Zuhair Bakheet | Al Wasl | 24 |
| 1988–89 | (United Arab Emirates) Fahad Khamees | Al Wasl | 13 |
| 1989–90 | (United Arab Emirates) Hussain Yaslam | Baniyas | 16 |
| 1990–91 | Cancelled^{a} | | |
| 1991–92 | (United Arab Emirates) Youssouf Atiq | Al Ahli | 25 |
| 1992–93 | (United Arab Emirates) Saif Sultan | Al Ain | 21 |
| 1993–94 | (United Arab Emirates) Abdulaziz Mohamed | Sharjah | 18 |
| 1994–95 | (United Arab Emirates) Bader Jassim | Al Wahda | 10 |
| 1995–96 | (United Arab Emirates) Jassim Al Dokhi | Al Shaab | 10 |
| 1996–97 | (United Arab Emirates) Bader Jassim | Al Wahda | 11 |
| 1997–98 | (United Arab Emirates) Ali Thani | Sharjah | 19 |
| 1998–99 | (Senegal) Alboury Lah | Al Wahda | 29 |
| 1999–00 | (Senegal) Alboury Lah | Al Wahda | 18 |
| 2000–01 | (United Arab Emirates) (Qatar) Mohammed Al Enazi | Al Wahda | 22 |
| 2001–02 | (United Arab Emirates) (Qatar) Mohammed Al Enazi | Al Wahda | 22 |
| 2002–03 | (Chile) Cristián Montecinos | Dubai | 19 |
| 2003–04 | (Iran) Ali Karimi | Al Ahli | 14 |
| 2004–05 | (Brazil) Valdir (Brazil) Anderson Barbosa | Al Nasr Sharjah | 23 |
| 2005–06 | (Brazil) Anderson Barbosa | Sharjah | 20 |
| 2006–07 | (Brazil) Anderson Barbosa (Iran) Ali Samereh | Al Wasl Al Shaab | 18 |
| 2007–08 | (United Arab Emirates) Faisal Khalil (Brazil) Anderson Barbosa | Al Ahli Sharjah | 16 |
| 2008–09 | (Brazil) Fernando Baiano | Al Jazira | 24 |
| 2009–10 | (Argentina) José Sand | Al Ain | 24 |
| 2010–11 | (Senegal) André Senghor | Baniyas | 18 |
| 2011–12 | (Ghana) Asamoah Gyan | Al Ain | 22 |
| 2012–13 | (Ghana) Asamoah Gyan | Al Ain | 31 |
| 2013–14 | (Ghana) Asamoah Gyan | Al Ain | 29 |
| 2014–15 | (Montenegro) Mirko Vučinić | Al Jazira | 25 |
| 2015–16 | (Argentina) Sebastián Tagliabúe | Al Wahda | 25 |
| 2016–17 | (United Arab Emirates) Ali Mabkhout | Al Jazira | 33 |
| 2017–18 | (Sweden) Marcus Berg | Al Ain | 25 |
| 2018–19 | (Argentina) Sebastián Tagliabúe | Al Wahda | 27 |
| 2019–20 | (Togo) Kodjo Laba | Al Ain | 19 |
| 2020–21 | (United Arab Emirates) Ali Mabkhout | Al Jazira | 25 |
| 2021–22 | (Togo) Kodjo Laba | Al Ain | 26 |
| 2022–23 | (Togo) Kodjo Laba | Al Ain | 28 |
| 2023–24 | (Syria) Omar Khribin | Al Wahda | 18 |
| 2024–25 | (Togo) Kodjo Laba | Al Ain | 20 |

=== Top scorers by country ===
| Country | Players | Seasons |
|---|---|---|
| United Arab Emirates | 17 | 22 |
| Brazil | 4 | 6 |
| Ghana | 2 | 4 |
| Argentina | 2 | 3 |
| Senegal | 2 | 3 |
| Togo | 2 | 4 |
| Iran | 1 | 1 |
| Pakistan | 1 | 1 |
| Sudan | 1 | 1 |
| Tunisia | 1 | 1 |
| Chile | 1 | 1 |
| Montenegro | 1 | 1 |
| Sweden | 1 | 1 |
| Syria | 1 | 1 |

== Honours ==
=== Tournaments ===
==== Intercontinental ====
- Club World Cup (7 appearances): 2009, 2010, 2017, 2018, 2021, 2024, 2025
  - (silver) Runners-up (1): 2018 (Al Ain)
- Granada City Cup (1 appearance): 2025
  - (gold) Champions (1): 2025 (Al Ain)
- Morocco Friendship Cup (2 appearances): 2015, 2016
  - (gold) Champions (2): 2015 (Al Ain), 2016 (Shabab Al Ahli)

==== Continental ====
- Asian Champions League 1 (35 appearances): 1985-86, 1990-91, 1991, 1992-93, 1993-94, 1994-95, 1995, 1996-97, 1997-98, 1998-99, 1999-00, 2000-01, 2001-02, 2002-03, 2004, 2005, 2006, 2007, 2008, 2009, 2010, 2011, 2012, 2013, 2014, 2015, 2016, 2017, 2018, 2019, 2020, 2021, 2022, 2023-24, 2024-25
  - (gold) Champions (2): 2002-03 (Al Ain), 2023-24 (Al Ain)
  - (silver) Runners-up (3): 2005 (Al Ain), 2015 (Shabab Al Ahli), 2016 (Al Ain)
  - (bronze) Third Place (2): 1992-93 (Al Wasl), 1998-99 (Al Ain)
- Asian Champions League 2 (13 appearances): 1990-91, 1991-92, 1992-93, 1993-94, 1994-95, 1995-96, 1996-97, 1997-98, 1998-99, 1999-00, 2000-01, 2001-02, 2024-25
  - (gold) Champions (1): 2024-25 (Sharjah)
  - (silver) Runners-up (1): 1994-95 (Sharjah)

==== Regional ====
- Arabian Gulf Champions League (32 appearances): 1982, 1983, 1985, 1986, 1987, 1988, 1989, 1991, 1992, 1993, 1994, 1995, 1996, 1997, 1998, 1999, 2000, 2001, 2002, 2003, 2005, 2006, 2007, 2008, 2009, 2011, 2012, 2013, 2014, 2015, 2016, 2024-25
  - (gold) Champions (8): 1992 (Shabab Al Ahli), 2001 (Al Ain), 2007 (Al Jazira), 2009 (Al Wasl), 2011 (Shabab Al Ahli), 2013 (Baniyas), 2014 (Al Nasr), 2015 (Shabab Al Ahli)
  - (silver) Runners-up (4): 1993 (Shabab Al Ahli), 2005 (Al Wasl), 2011 (Shabab Al Ahli), 2012 (Al Wasl)
- Qatar Challenge Cup (6 appearances): 2024, 2025
  - (gold) Champions (5): 2024 (Shabab Al Ahli), 2025 (Al Wahda, Al Nasr, Shabab Al Ahli, Al Wasl)
  - (silver) Runners-up (1): 2024 (Sharjah)

==== Summary ====
Only official honours are included, according to FIFA statutes (competitions organized/recognized by FIFA or an affiliated confederation).

| Competition | 1st place, gold medalist(s) | 2nd place, silver medalist(s) | 3rd place, bronze medalist(s) | Total |
|---|---|---|---|---|
| Club World Cup | 0 | 1 | 0 | 1 |
| Asian Champions League 1 | 2 | 3 | 2 | 7 |
| Asian Champions League 2 | 1 | 1 | 0 | 2 |
| Total | 3 | 5 | 2 | 10 |

=== Individual ===
==== Intercontinental ====
- Asian Footballer of the Year (1 appearance): 1990
  - (bronze) Third place (1): 1990 (Adnan Al-Talyani — Sharjah)

==== Continental ====
- Asian Footballer of the Year (8 appearances): 2001, 2004, 2007, 2008, 2014, 2015, 2016, 2017
  - (gold) Winner (3): 2004 (Ali Karimi — Shabab Al Ahli), 2015 (Ahmed Khalil — Shabab Al Ahli), 2016 (Omar Abdulrahman — Al Ain)
