= 2024–25 Shabab Al Ahli Club season =

Sharjah
2024–25 season
- Manager: Paulo Sousa
- Stadium: Rashid Stadium
- UAE Pro League: 2nd
- President's Cup: Final stages
- UAE League Cup: Final stages
- AFC Champions League Two: Group stage

The 2024–25 season is Shabab Al Ahli Club's 67th since its founding and their eighth consecutive year in the UAE's top division. The team competes in the UAE Pro League, President's Cup, UAE League Cup and AFC Champions League Two.

== Competitions ==
=== Overall record ===
Competition	First match	Last match	Starting round	Final position	Record							
Competition	First match	Last match	Starting round	Final position	Pld	W	D	L	GF	GA	GD	Win %
UAE Pro League	23 August 2024		Matchday 1	Winner	26	19	6	1	57	22	+35	73.08
President's Cup				Winner	4	4	0	0	7	2	+5	100.00
League Cup	18 August 2024		First round	Runner-up	7	3	3	1	16	11	+5	42.86
AFC Champions League Elite			Preliminary Round	Play-off	2	1	0	1	4	2	+2	50.00
AFC Champions League Two			Group stage	Quarter-final	10	6	3	1	25	16	+9	60.00
UAE Super Cup			Final	Winner	1	0	1	0	2	2	+0	0.00
UAE-Qatar Challenge Shield			Final	Winner	1	1	0	0	3	1	+2	100.00
Total					51	34	13	4	114	56	+58	66.67

Source: Competitions

=== UAE Pro League ===
==== League table ====
Pos	Team	Pld	W	D	L	GF	GA	GD	Pts	Qualification or relegation
1	Shabab Al Ahli (C)	26	19	6	1	57	22	+35	63	Qualification for AFC CLE league stage (Note: Since the winners of the 2024–25 UAE President's Cup, Shabab Al Ahli, had already qualified for the AFC Champions League Elite, the spot given to the UAE President's Cup winners (Champions League Two) was passed to the third-placed team.)
2	Sharjah	26	16	3	7	44	22	+22	51	Qualification for AFC CLE league stage
3	Al Wahda	26	13	9	4	51	32	+19	48	Qualification for AFC CLE league stage
4	Al Wasl	26	13	7	6	51	35	+16	46	Qualification for AFC CL2 group stage
5	Al Ain	26	12	8	6	56	32	+24	44	Qualification for AGCFF GCCL group stage

Source: UPLeague
Rules for classification: 1) points; 2) head-to-head goal difference; 3) head-to-head goals scored; 4) head-to-head away goals scored; 5) goal difference; 6) number of goals scored; 7) number of away goals scored; 8) head-to-head points; 9) fair play ranking 10) draw
(C) Champions

==== Results summary ====
Overall								Home						Away					
Pld	W	D	L	GF	GA	GD	Pts	W	D	L	GF	GA	GD	W	D	L	GF	GA	GD
17	15	2	0	42	13	+29	47	9	1	0	23	8	+15	6	1	0	19	5	+14

Last updated: 28 February 2025.
Source: soccerway

==== Results by round ====
Round	1	2	3	4	5	6	7	8	9	10	11	12	13	14	15	16	17	18	19	20
Ground	H	A	H	A	A	H	A	H	A	H	H	A	H	A	H	A	H	H	A	H
Result	W	W	W	W	W	W	W	D	D	W	W	W	W	W	W		W	W		
Position	5	3	2	2	2	1	1	1	2	2	1	1	1	1	1		1	1		

Updated to match(es) played on 28 February 2025. Source: worldfootball
A = Away; H = Home; W = Win; D = Draw; L = Loss

==== Matches ====
The match schedule was released on 6 July.

24 August 2024 1	Shabab Al Ahli	2–1	Al Bataeh
18:00

30 August 2024 2	Ajman	1–2	Shabab Al Ahli
20:30

22 September 2024 3	Shabab Al Ahli	5–4	Al Wahda
17:30

27 September 2024 4	Al Orooba	1–4	Shabab Al Ahli
17:20

6 October 2024 5	Bani Yas	1–5	Shabab Al Ahli	Abu Dhabi
17:10	Fawaz Awana (yellow card) 15'; João Victor (red card) 42'; Niakaté 57'	Report	Milivojević (yellow card) 6' (goal) 34'; Rikelme (yellow card) 28'; Niakaté 50' (o.g.); Azmoun 63'; Dabbur 87'; Ezatolahi 90+2' (pen.)	Stadium: Baniyas Stadium; Referee: (United Arab Emirates) Nawaf Alzeyouidi

27 October 2024 6	Shabab Al Ahli	2–1	Sharjah	Dubai
19:30 GST	Yuri César (yellow card) 11'; Planić (yellow card) 22'; Azmoun 55' (red card) 90+2'; Saeed Suleiman (yellow card) 83'; Cartabia 87' (pen.); Dabbur (yellow card) 90+7'; Mateusão (yellow card) 90+18'	Report	Ousmane Camara (yellow card) 20'; Khaled Ibrahim (yellow card) 45+2'; Majed Hassan (yellow card) 45+3'; Luanzinho (yellow card) 57'; Marcus Meloni (yellow card) 65'; Mayed Mohsen (red card) 90+2'; Guilherme Biro 90+7'; Adel Al-Hosani (red card) 90+16'	Stadium: Rashid Stadium; Referee: (United Arab Emirates) Ahmad Salem Khalfan

22 November 2024 8	Shabab Al Ahli	0–0	Kalba	Dubai
16:40 GST	Renan (yellow card) 29'; Cartabia (yellow card) 39'; Mateusão (yellow card) 90+7'	Report	Leandro Spadacio (yellow card) 9'; Salem Rashid (yellow card) 22'; Kouadjo Koffi (yellow card) 37'; Sultan Al-Mantheri (yellow card) 90'	Stadium: Rashid Stadium; Referee: (United Arab Emirates) Sultan Abdurazzaq

8 December 2024 9	Khor Fakkan Club	1–1	Shabab Al Ahli	Khor Fakkan
16:45 GST	Omar Saeed (yellow card) 22'; Kwon Kyung-won (yellow card) 49'; Lourency 90+7' (pen.)	Report	Kauan Santos 37'; Guilherme Bala (yellow card) 66'; Planić (yellow card) 73'	Stadium: Saqr bin Mohammed Al Qasimi Stadium; Referee: (United Arab Emirates) Ahmed Eisa Mohamed

17 December 2024 10	Shabab Al Ahli	3–0	Al Wasl	Dubai
19:33 GST	Kauan Santos (yellow card) 5'; Dabbur 13' (yellow card) 74'; Guilherme Bala 39'; Cartabia (yellow card) 47'; Ezatolahi 90+4'	Report	Rodrigo Oliveira (yellow card) 16'; Majed Suroor (yellow card) 57'; Giménez (yellow card) 77'	Stadium: Rashid Stadium; Referee: (Slovenia) Slavko Vinčić

5 January 2025 11	Shabab Al Ahli	2–0	Al-Nasr SC	Dubai
16:55 GST	Planić (yellow card) 50'; Igor Gomes (yellow card) 70'; Milivojević (yellow card) 70'; Azmoun 76' (pen.); Ezatolahi 80'	Report		Stadium: Rashid Stadium; Referee: (United Arab Emirates) Ahmad Salem Khalfan

10 January 2025 7	Al Ain	0–1	Shabab Al Ahli	Al Ain
19:45 GST	Abdoul Karim Traoré (yellow card) 14'; Park Yong-woo (yellow card) 53'; Kaku (yellow card) 77'	Report	Ezatolahi (yellow card) 5'; Azmoun 34' (yellow card) 45+2'; Rikelme (yellow card) 58'; Hamad Al-Meqbali (yellow card) 90+3'; Guilherme Bala (yellow card) 90+6'	Stadium: Hazza bin Zayed Stadium; Referee: (Brazil) Wilton Sampaio

=== President's Cup ===
19 October 2024 Round of 16	Dibba Al-Hisn	0–2	Shabab Al Ahl	Dibba Al-Hisn
17:55		Report		Stadium: Dibba Stadium

25 January 2025 Quarter Finals	Shabab Al Ahl	2–1	Ajman	Sharjah
17:10		Report		Stadium: Khalid bin Mohammed Stadium

=== League Cup ===
18 August 2024 First leg	Shabab Al Ahli	2–0	Ajman	Dubai
20:45 UTC+4				Stadium: Rashid Stadium; Referee: Bader Bujamhoor

8 September 2024 Second leg	Ajman	1–1 (1–3 agg.)	Shabab Al Ahli	Ajman
20:15 UTC+4				Stadium: Ajman Stadium; Referee: Sultan Abdurazzaq

==== Quarter Finals ====
23 December 2024 First leg	Shabab Al Ahli	2–0	Al-Nasr	Dubai
19:45	Azmoun 47'; Cartabia 77'	Report	Hussain Mahdi (yellow card) 44'; Rashed Essa (yellow card) 90+1'	Stadium: Rashid Stadium; Referee: (United Arab Emirates) Adel Al Naqbi

29 December 2024 Second leg	Al-Nasr	5–5 (5–7 agg.)	Shabab Al Ahli	Dubai
19:45	Gustavo Alemão (yellow card) 11'; Abdoulaye Touré (yellow card) 38'; Taarabt 50'; Renan 57' (o.g.); Ali Mabkhout 71'; Rashed Mohammed (yellow card) 72'; Azarkan 73' 75'	Report	Cartabia 23' (pen.); Dabbur 44' 55' 66'; Renan (yellow card) 48'; Eid Khamis (yellow card) 89'; Mateusão 90+2' (yellow card) 90+3'	Stadium: Al Maktoum Stadium; Referee: (United Arab Emirates) Hamad Ali Yousef

==== Semi Finals ====
18 March 2025 First leg	Sharjah	–	Shabab Al Ahli	Sharjah
22:00				Stadium: Sharjah Stadium

23 March 2025 Second leg	Shabab Al Ahli	–	Sharjah	Dubai
22:00				Stadium: Rashid Stadium
