= 2024–25 Sharjah FC season =

Sharjah
2024–25 season
- Manager: Cosmin Olăroiu
- Stadium: Sharjah Stadium
- UAE Pro League: 1st
- President's Cup: Final stages
- UAE League Cup: Final stages
- AFC Champions League Two: Winners

The 2024–25 season is Sharjah FC's 59th since its founding and their 12th consecutive year in the UAE's top division. The team competes in the UAE Pro League, President's Cup, UAE League Cup and AFC Champions League Two.

== Competitions ==
=== Overall record ===
| Competition | First match | Last match | Starting round | Final position | Record | | | | | | | |
| Competition | First match | Last match | Starting round | Final position | Pld | W | D | L | GF | GA | GD | Win % |
|---|---|---|---|---|---|---|---|---|---|---|---|---|
| UAE Pro League | 24 August 2024 | | Matchday 1 | 2nd | 26 | 16 | 3 | 7 | 44 | 22 | +22 | 61.54 |
| President's Cup | | | | Runner-up | 4 | 3 | 0 | 1 | 7 | 3 | +4 | 75.00 |
| League Cup | 17 August 2024 | | First round | Semi-final | 6 | 3 | 1 | 2 | 10 | 9 | +1 | 50.00 |
| AFC Champions League Two | | | Group stage | Winner | 13 | 7 | 3 | 3 | 20 | 13 | +7 | 53.85 |
| Total | | | | | 49 | 29 | 7 | 13 | 81 | 47 | +34 | 59.18 |

Last updated: 6 October 2024
Source: Competitions

=== UAE Pro League ===
==== League table ====
| Pos | Team | Pld | W | D | L | GF | GA | GD | Pts | Qualification or relegation |
|---|---|---|---|---|---|---|---|---|---|---|
| 1 | Shabab Al Ahli (C) | 26 | 19 | 6 | 1 | 57 | 22 | +35 | 63 | Qualification for AFC Champions League Elite League stage (Note: Since the winners of the 2024–25 UAE President's Cup, Shabab Al Ahli, had already qualified for the AFC Champions League Elite, the spot given to the UAE President's Cup winners (Champions League Two) was passed to the third-placed team.) |
| 2 | Sharjah | 26 | 16 | 3 | 7 | 44 | 22 | +22 | 51 | Qualification for AFC Champions League Elite League stage |
| 3 | Al Wahda | 26 | 13 | 9 | 4 | 51 | 32 | +19 | 48 | Qualification for AFC Champions League Elite League stage |
| 4 | Al Wasl | 26 | 13 | 7 | 6 | 51 | 35 | +16 | 46 | Qualification for AFC Champions League Two group stage |
| 5 | Al Ain | 26 | 12 | 8 | 6 | 56 | 32 | +24 | 44 | Qualification for AGCFF Gulf Club Champions League group stage |

Source: UPLeague
Rules for classification: 1) points; 2) head-to-head goal difference; 3) head-to-head goals scored; 4) head-to-head away goals scored; 5) goal difference; 6) number of goals scored; 7) number of away goals scored; 8) head-to-head points; 9) fair play ranking 10) draw
(C) Champions

==== Results summary ====
| Overall | | | | | | | | Home | | | | | | Away | | | | | |
| Pld | W | D | L | GF | GA | GD | Pts | W | D | L | GF | GA | GD | W | D | L | GF | GA | GD |
|---|---|---|---|---|---|---|---|---|---|---|---|---|---|---|---|---|---|---|---|
| 26 | 16 | 3 | 7 | 44 | 22 | +22 | 51 | 9 | 1 | 3 | 23 | 8 | +15 | 7 | 2 | 4 | 21 | 14 | +7 |

Last updated: 25 May 2025.
Source: Worldfootball

==== Results by round ====
| Round | 1 | 2 | 3 | 4 | 5 | 6 | 7 | 8 | 9 | 10 |
|---|---|---|---|---|---|---|---|---|---|---|
| Ground | A | H | H | A | H | A | A | H | A | H |
| Result | W | W | W | W | W | L | W | W | W | W |
| Position | 3 | 2 | 1 | 1 | 1 | 2 | 2 | 2 | 1 | 1 |

Updated to match(es) played on 14 December 2024. Source: Worldfootball
A = Away; H = Home; W = Win; D = Draw; L = Loss

==== Matches ====
The match schedule was released on 6 July.

| 24 August 2024 1 | Dibba Al Hisn | 1–4 | Sharjah | Khor Fakkan |
| 20:30 UTC+4 | | | | Stadium: Saqr bin Mohammad al Qassimi Stadium |

| 29 August 2024 2 | Sharjah | 1–0 | Kalba | Sharjah |
| 20:30 UTC+4 | | | | Stadium: Khalid bin Mohammed Stadium |

| 21 September 2024 3 | Sharjah | 4–0 | Al Jazira | Sharjah |
| 17:30 UTC+4 | | | | Stadium: Khalid bin Mohammed Stadium |

| 26 September 2024 4 | Al Bataeh | 0–2 | Sharjah | Sharjah |
| 17:20 UTC+4 | | | | Stadium: Khalid bin Mohammed Stadium |

| 6 October 2024 5 | Sharjah | 2–1 | Al Orooba | Sharjah |
| | | | | Stadium: Khalid bin Mohammed Stadium |

| 27 October 2024 6 | Shabab Al Ahli | 2–1 | Sharjah | Dubai |
| 18:30 GST | Yuri César (yellow card) 11'; Planić (yellow card) 22'; Azmoun 55' (red card) 90+2'; Suleiman (yellow card) 83'; Cartabia 87' (pen.); Dabbur (yellow card) 90+7'; Mateusão (yellow card) 90+18' | Report | Ousmane Camara (yellow card) 20'; Khaled Ibrahim (yellow card) 45+2'; Hassan (yellow card) 45+3'; Luanzinho (yellow card) 57'; Meloni (yellow card) 65'; Guilherme Biro 90+7'; Al-Hosani (red card) 90+16' | Stadium: Rashid Stadium; Referee: (United Arab Emirates) A Khalfan |

| 31 October 2024 7 | Baniyas | 1–4 | Sharjah | Abu Dhabi |
| 15:50 GST | Awana (yellow card) 17'; Bångsbo 22'; Lusamba (yellow card) 71'; Fahad Badr (yellow card) 84' | Report | Guilherme Biro 12'; Luanzinho 43' (pen.); Rashid (yellow card) 71'; Conraad 81'; Petrović 90+1' | Stadium: Baniyas Stadium; Referee: (United Arab Emirates) N Al Ali |

| 22 November 2024 8 | Sharjah | 3–0 | Al-Nasr SC | Sharjah |
| 15:40 GST | Ousmane Camara 33' 59'; Petrović (yellow card) 49'; Guilherme Biro 83' (yellow card) 90+4' | Report | Mohamed Abdelrahman Ibrahim (yellow card) 15'; Nasser Al Naaimi (yellow card) 30' | Stadium: Khalid bin Mohammed Stadium |

| 8 December 2024 9 | Ajman Club | 0–1 | Sharjah | Ajman |
| 18:30 GST | Flemmings (yellow card) 6'; Bilal Yousif (yellow card) 49'; Lithierry Silva (yellow card) 60'; Faiz (yellow card) 70' | Report | Caio Lucas 68' (pen.); Rashid (yellow card) 81'; Olăroiu (yellow card) | Stadium: Ajman Stadium |

| 14 December 2024 10 | Sharjah | 2–0 | Al Wahda FC | Sharjah |
| 18:30 GST | Luanzinho (yellow card) 8'; Ibrahim 34'; Larbi 37'; Meloni (yellow card) 56' | Report | Khribin (yellow card) 61'; Hamad (yellow card) 63' | Stadium: Khalid bin Mohammed Stadium |

=== President's Cup ===
| 18 October 2024 Round of 16 | Al-Nasr | 0–2 | Sharjah | Dubai |
| 17:00 GST | | Report | Ousmane Camara 58'; Conraad (yellow card) 78'; Caio Lucas 82' (yellow card) 90+4' | Stadium: Al Maktoum Stadium; Referee: (United Arab Emirates) B Bujamhoor |

=== League Cup ===
| 17 August 2024 First leg | Khorfakkan | 0–1 | Sharjah |

| 7 September 2024 Second leg | Sharjah | 2–1 (3–1 agg.) | Khorfakkan |

=== AFC Champions League Two ===
==== Group stage ====
| Pos | Team | Pld | W | D | L | GF | GA | GD | Pts | Qualification |
|---|---|---|---|---|---|---|---|---|---|---|
| 1 | (United Arab Emirates) Sharjah | 6 | 4 | 1 | 1 | 13 | 8 | +5 | 13 | Advance to round of 16 |
| 2 | (Jordan) Al-Wehdat | 6 | 3 | 2 | 1 | 8 | 7 | +1 | 11 | Advance to round of 16 |
| 3 | (Iran) Sepahan | 6 | 3 | 1 | 2 | 12 | 7 | +5 | 10 | |
| 4 | (Tajikistan) Istiklol | 6 | 0 | 0 | 6 | 1 | 12 | −11 | 0 | |

Source: AFC
Rules for classification: Tiebreakers

| 17 September 2024 1 | Istiklol (Tajikistan) | 0–1 | (United Arab Emirates) Sharjah | Dushanbe, Tajikstan |
| 21:00 UTC+4 | | | Ben Larbi 72' | Stadium: Pamir Stadium; Referee: Ammar Ebrahim Mahfoodh (Bahrain) |

| 1 October 2024 2 | Sharjah (United Arab Emirates) | 2–2 | (Jordan) Al-Wehdat | Sharjah |
| | Alcácer 9'; Nejašmić 66' | | Gueye 28', 62' | Stadium: Khalid bin Mohammed Stadium; Referee: Ammar Ashkanani (Kuwait) |

| 22 October 2024 3 | Sharjah (United Arab Emirates) | 3–1 | (Iran) Sepahan | Sharjah |
| 18:00 UTC+4 | Ousmane Camara 26'; Luanzinho 70'; Khaled Ibrahim (yellow card) 88'; Caio Lucas 90' (yellow card) 90+7' | Report | Mehdi Limouchi 51'; Karimi (yellow card) 68'; Yousefi (yellow card) 90+7' | Stadium: Khalid bin Mohammed Stadium; Attendance: 1,002; Referee: (South Korea) Kim Dae-yong |

| 5 November 2024 4 | Sepahan (Iran) | 3–1 | (United Arab Emirates) Sharjah | Doha |
| 21:00 GST | Hazbavi 12'; Yousefi 45+3'; Aghaeipour 90+1' | Report | Luanzinho 61' | Stadium: Hamad bin Khalifa Stadium; Attendance: 373; Referee: (China) Shen Yinhao |

| 26 November 2024 5 | Sharjah (United Arab Emirates) | 3–1 | (Tajikistan) Istiklol | Sharjah |
| 18:00 GST | Luanzinho 21' (yellow card) 52'; Ousmane Camara 30'; Caio Lucas 58' (pen.); Ghanem (yellow card) 69'; Al-Hosani (yellow card) 80' | Report | Panjshanbe 24'; Dzhalilov (yellow card) 59' | Stadium: Sharjah Stadium; Attendance: 689; Referee: (South Korea) Kim Woo-sung |

| 3 December 2024 6 | Al-Wehdat (Jordan) | 1–3 | (United Arab Emirates) Sharjah | Amman |
| 17:00 GST | Afaneh 38'; Alain Akono (yellow card) 43'; Faisal (yellow card) 45+1' | Report | Caio Lucas 31' (yellow card) 75'; Luanzinho 47' 67' | Stadium: Amman International Stadium; Attendance: 1,365; Referee: (Australia) Alex King |
