= 2021–22 UAE League Cup =

Tournament details
- Country: United Arab Emirates
- Dates: 8 October 2021 – 4 May 2022
- Teams: 14

Final positions
- Champions: Al Ain (2nd title)
- Runners-up: Shabab Al Ahli

Tournament statistics
- Matches played: 18
- Goals scored: 52 (2.89 per match)
- Top goal scorer: Michel Araújo (6 goals)

The 2021–22 UAE League Cup is the 14th season of the UAE League Cup. Shabab Al Ahli were the defending champions. The competition is set to start on 8 October 2021.

== First round ==
Source: soccerway
All times are local (UTC+04:00)

=== First leg ===
8 October 2021 First round	Khor Fakkan	3–2	Al Wahda	Khor Fakkan
18:15	Mubarak 35'; Rashid 45+3'; Waleed 54'	Report	João Pedro 62', 68'	Stadium: Saqr bin Mohammad al Qassimi Stadium; Referee: Ahmed Al Hammadi; Assistant referees: Ahmed Al Hossani; Amer Hasan; Fourth official: Yousuf Al Shamali

15 October 2021 First round	Kalba	4–0	Al Urooba	Kalba
18:15	Salem 45+2'; Al-Naqbi 49'; Camara 54', 75'	Report		Stadium: Ittihad Kalba Stadium; Referee: Adel Al Naqbi; Assistant referees: Saeed Al Mansoori; Hamdan Mohamed Juma; Fourth official: Zayed Al Awakli

15 October 2021 First round	Al Ain	2–0	Emirates	Al Ain
18:15	Guanca 73'; Rahimi 82'	Report		Stadium: Hazza bin Zayed Stadium; Referee: Ali Al Zarouni; Assistant referees: Mohamed Al Maazmi; Hasan Abdulrahman Al Jelani; Fourth official: Ahmad Al Naqbi

15 October 2021 First round	Ajman	2–2	Sharjah	Ajman
20:30	Larbi 20', 58'	Report	Al-Attas 11'; Luanzinho 45+2'	Stadium: Ajman Stadium; Referee: Mohammed Abdulla Al Ali; Assistant referees: Mohamed Ali Hilal; Ali Abdulla Shamlan; Fourth official: Hasan Al Blooshi

16 October 2021 First round	Al Dhafra	1–3	Al Nasr	Madinat Zayed
18:15	Ezekiel 57'	Report	Saba 2', 50'; Tozé 36'	Stadium: Al Dhafra Stadium; Referee: Naser Al Ali; Assistant referees: Ibrahim Al Ajmi; Turki Al-Zaabi; Fourth official: Amer Al Dhubiea

16 October 2021 First round	Baniyas	1–2	Al Wasl	Al Shamkha, Abu Dhabi
18:15	Khamis 7'	Report	Lima 23'; Araújo 44'	Stadium: Baniyas Stadium; Referee: Yousif Al Jasmi; Assistant referees: Ali Saeed Al Naqbi; Mohammed Ghulaita Al Shehhi; Fourth official: Nawaf Al Zeyouidi

=== Second leg ===
25 October 2021 First round	Sharjah	3–3 (5–5 agg.)	Ajman	Sharjah
18:15	Malango 3', 57'; Shukurov 61'	Report	Trawally 79' (pen.); Al-Junaibi 83'; Yousif 89'	Stadium: Sharjah Stadium; Referee: Ahmed Hussain Bilal; Assistant referees: Ahmed Abdouli; Saeed Al-Marzooqi; Fourth official: Fahad Khalaf
Note: Ajman advanced on away goals

25 October 2021 First round	Al Nasr	0–0 (3–1 agg.)	Al Dhafra	Al Nasr, Dubai
18:15		Report		Stadium: Al Maktoum Stadium; Referee: Nawaf Al Zeyouidi; Assistant referees: Zayed Dawood; Waled Al Karmati; Fourth official: Saif Ahmed

25 October 2021 First round	Al Urooba	1–0 (1–4 agg.)	Kalba	Khor Fakkan
20:30	Qadir 32'	Report		Stadium: Saqr bin Mohammad al Qassimi Stadium; Referee: Hasan Al Blooshi; Assistant referees: Talal Al Nuaimi; Ali Shalman; Fourth official: Suhail Abdulla Ali

25 October 2021 First round	Al Wasl	2–0 (4–1 agg.)	Baniyas	Zabeel, Dubai
20:30	Araújo 43', 77'	Report		Stadium: Zabeel Stadium; Referee: Amer Al Dhubiea; Assistant referees: Khamis Fayroz; Jasim Al Ajmi; Fourth official: Humaid Al Shamsi

26 October 2021 First round	Emirates	1–0 (1–2 agg.)	Al Ain	Ras Al Khaimah
18:15	Yago 78'	Report		Stadium: Emirates Club Stadium; Referee: Zayed Al Awakli; Assistant referees: Mohammed Ali Al Shehhi; Yasser Al Murshidi; Fourth official: Yousuf Hassan Al Shamali

7 November 2021 First round	Al Wahda	1–0 (3–3 agg.)	Khor Fakkan	Al Nahyan, Abu Dhabi
20:30	Ángel 71'	Report		Stadium: Al Nahyan Stadium; Referee: Yousif Al Jasmi; Assistant referees: Ahmed Abdouli; Abdulla Al-Marzooqi; Fourth official: Khalid Al Mulla

== 9th–14th place playoffs ==
This season's league cup will introduce a play off group for the losing teams in the first round to determine the final placements.

Team	Pld	W	D	L	GF	GA	GD	Pts
Emirates	5	3	1	1	5	3	+2	10
Sharjah	5	2	3	0	7	3	+4	9
Al Urooba	5	1	3	1	8	6	+2	6
Al Dhafra	5	2	0	3	8	13	−5	6
Baniyas	5	1	2	2	6	7	−1	5
Khor Fakkan	5	1	1	3	6	8	−2	4

Updated to match(es) played on Completed. Source: Soccerway

12 November 2021	Emirates	1–0	Al Urooba	Ras Al Khaimah
18:00	Yousif 81'	Report		Stadium: Emirates Club Stadium; Referee: Khalid Al Mulla

12 November 2021	Baniyas	2–3	Al Dhafra	Al Shamkha, Abu Dhabi
18:00	Suárez 9'; Al-Balochi 69'	Report	El Adoua 8'; Saif 57'; Diop 67'	Stadium: Baniyas Stadium; Referee: Fahad Khalaf

12 November 2021	Sharjah	2–1	Khor Fakkan	Sharjah
20:15	Meloni 52'; Al-Attas 68' (pen.)	Report	Andrey 18'	Stadium: Sharjah Stadium; Referee: Yousuf Al Shamali

26 November 2021	Al Urooba	2–2	Baniyas	Ajman
18:00		Report		Stadium: Ajman Stadium

26 November 2021	Al Dhafra	1–4	Sharjah	Madinat Zayed
18:00	Saif 44'	Report	Sultan 4'; Al-Attas 39'; Saleh 55'; Meloni 86'	Stadium: Al Dhafra Stadium

26 November 2021	Khor Fakkan	0–1	Emirates	Khor Fakkan
20:15		Report	Motta 90+3'	Stadium: Saqr bin Mohammad al Qassimi Stadium; Referee: Ahmed Khalfan

4 December 2021	Baniyas	0–1	Emirates	Al Shamkha, Abu Dhabi
18:00		Report	Boulahia 90+1'	Stadium: Baniyas Stadium; Referee: Ahmed Al Hammadi

4 December 2021	Al Dhafra	1–2	Khor Fakkan	Madinat Zayed
18:00	Diop 20' (pen.)	Report	Tanque 2'; Nasser 59'	Stadium: Al Dhafra Stadium; Referee: Humaid Al Shamsi

4 December 2021	Sharjah	1–1	Al Urooba	Sharjah
20:15	Caio 36'	Report	Atassi 90+1'	Stadium: Sharjah Stadium; Referee: Fahed Khalaf

9 December 2021	Al Urooba	3–0	Al Dhafra	Fujairah
18:00	Obaid 27'; Eduwo 37', 90+5'	Report		Stadium: Fujairah Club Stadium; Referee: Naser Al Ali

9 December 2021	Emirates	0–0	Sharjah	Ras Al Khaimah
18:00		Report		Stadium: Emirates Club Stadium; Referee: Abdulla Ashtyri

9 December 2021	Khor Fakkan	1–2	Baniyas	Khor Fakkan
20:15	Douglas Tanque 43'	Report	Al-Noubi 50'; Abunamous 60'	Stadium: Saqr bin Mohammad al Qassimi Stadium; Referee: Khalid Al Mulla

23 January 2022	Al Dhafra	3–2	Emirates	Madinat Zayed
17:15	Marcos 3'; Amesimeku 50'; Diop 77'	Report	Seyi 31'; Yousif 70'	Stadium: Al Dhafra Stadium; Referee: Saif Ahmed

23 January 2022	Khor Fakkan	2–2	Al Urooba	Khor Fakkan
17:15	Caíque 8'; Juninho 65'	Report	Moosa 19'; Valencia 84'	Stadium: Saqr bin Mohammad al Qassimi Stadium; Referee: Suhail Abdulla Ali

23 January 2022	Sharjah	2–2	Baniyas	Sharjah
19:45	Saleh 44'; Camara 56'	Report	Al-Hashemi 67', 90' (pen.)	Stadium: Sharjah Stadium; Referee: Ahmed Hassan Bilal

== Quarter-finals ==
Both the defending champions and current league winners enter in this round.

=== First leg ===
16 December 2021 Quarter-finals	Kalba	3–3	Al Jazira	Kalba
18:00	Al Fardan 18'; Camara 43'; Mlapa 72' (pen.)	Report	Victor 26', 48'; Diaby 38'	Stadium: Ittihad Kalba Stadium; Referee: Mohomed Obaid Khadim; Assistant referees: Mohammed Ghulaita Al Shehhi; Ali Saeed Al Naqbi; Fourth official: Ahmed Hassan Bilal

16 December 2021 Quarter-finals	Al Nasr	0–0	Al Wahda	Al Nasr, Dubai
20:15		Report		Stadium: Al Maktoum Stadium; Referee: Mohamed Al Harmoodi; Assistant referees: Mohammed Al Obedly; Amer Hasan; Fourth official: Amer Al Dhubiea

17 December 2021 Quarter-finals	Shabab Al Ahli	2–1	Ajman	Deira, Dubai
18:00	Al Kamali 34'; Abdulrahman 57'	Report	Jassim 65'	Stadium: Rashid Stadium; Referee: Khalid Bu Hasan; Assistant referees: Ahmed Abdouli; Saeed Al-Marzooqi; Fourth official: Ahmed Hasan Al Hammadi

17 December 2021 Quarter-finals	Al Ain	3–3	Al Wasl	Al Ain
20:15	Laba 19' (pen.), 32'; Caio 45+1'	Report	Araújo 5', 43', 90+3'	Stadium: Hazza bin Zayed Stadium; Referee: Adel Al Naqbi; Assistant referees: Salah Salim; Ali Shamlan; Fourth official: Zayed Al Awakli

=== Second leg ===
3 January 2022 Quarter-finals	Al Jazira	2–1 (5–4 agg.)	Kalba	Al Nahyan, Abu Dhabi
17:00	Ramadan 18'; Bruno 33'	Report	Adil 15'	Stadium: Mohammad Bin Zayed Stadium; Referee: Adel Al Naqbi; Assistant referees: Zayed Dawood; Mohamed Ali Hilal; Fourth official: Yousif Al Jasmi

3 January 2022 Quarter-finals	Ajman	0–1 (1–3 agg.)	Shabab Al Ahli	Ajman
19:30		Report	Ghayedi 32'	Stadium: Ajman Stadium; Referee: Hamad Ali; Assistant referees: Ali Mohamed Al Nuaimi; Ali Saeed Al Naqbi; Fourth official: Amer Al Dhubiea

4 January 2022 Quarter-finals	Al Wahda	2–0 (2–0 agg.)	Al Nasr	Al Nahyan, Abu Dhabi
17:00	Pedro 15'; Ibrahim 17'	Report		Stadium: Al Nahyan Stadium; Referee: Sultan Mohamed; Assistant referees: Jasem Abdulla Al Ali; Hassan Ali Al Hammadi; Fourth official: Naser Al Ali

4 January 2022 Quarter-finals	Al Wasl	3–4 (6–7 agg.)	Al Ain	Zabeel, Dubai
19:30	Jonatas 14' (o.g.); Adryelson 19'; Khamis 59'	Report	Guanca 5', 53'; Jonatas 66'; Laba 84' (pen.)	Stadium: Zabeel Stadium; Referee: Ahmed Eisa Mohamed; Assistant referees: Hassan Suqatari Al Mahri; Ahmed Abdouli; Fourth official: Ahmed Hasan Al Hammadi

== 5th–8th place playoffs ==
Team	Pld	W	D	L	GF	GA	GD	Pts
Kalba	3	2	1	0	3	1	+2	7
Al Wasl	3	2	0	1	5	1	+4	6
Ajman	3	1	0	2	1	5	−4	3
Al Nasr	3	0	1	2	1	3	−2	1

Updated to match(es) played on 29 January. Source: Soccerway

22 January 2022	Kalba	1–0	Al Wasl	Kalba
17:00	Žulj 40' (pen.)	Report		Stadium: Ittihad Kalba Stadium; Referee: Humaid Al Shamsi

22 January 2022	Ajman	1–0	Al Nasr	Ajman
19:30	Mena 87'	Report		Stadium: Ajman Stadium; Referee: Ahmed Hasan Al Hammadi

29 January 2022	Al Wasl	4–0	Ajman	Zabeel, Dubai
17:15	Abdulrahman 11'; Khamis 52'; Ahmed 61'; Douglas 74'	Report		Stadium: Zabeel Stadium; Referee: Khalid Al Mulla

29 January 2022	Al Nasr	1–1	Kalba	Al Nasr, Dubai
19:45	Eid 90+4'	Report	Jshak 26'	Stadium: Al Maktoum Stadium; Referee: Ali Al Zarouni

25 March 2022	Kalba	1–0	Ajman	Kalba
17:45		Report		Stadium: Ittihad Kalba Stadium

25 March 2022	Al Wasl	1–0	Al Nasr	Zabeel, Dubai
17:45		Report		Stadium: Zabeel Stadium

== Semi-finals ==
=== First leg ===
1 March 2022 Semi-finals	Shabab Al Ahli	1–0	Al Wahda	Deira, Dubai
17:30	Oliveira 80'	Report		Stadium: Rashid Stadium; Referee: Sultan Mohamed; Assistant referees: Jasem Abdulla Al Ali; Waled Al Karmati; Fourth official: Amer Al Dhubiea

1 March 2022 Semi-finals	Al Jazira	1–1	Al Ain	Al Nahyan, Abu Dhabi
20:00	Sultan 51'	Report	Autonne 19'	Stadium: Mohammed bin Zayed Stadium; Referee: Ahmed Eisa Mohamed; Assistant referees: Hassan Al Mahri; Mohammed Ghulaita Al Shehhi; Fourth official: Khalid Bu Hasan

=== Second leg ===
8 March 2022 Semi-finals	Al Wahda	1–3 (1–4 agg.)	Shabab Al Ahli	Al Nahyan, Abu Dhabi
17:45		Report		Stadium: Al Nahyan Stadium

8 March 2022 Semi-finals	Al Ain	(a) 0–0 (1–1 agg.)	Al Jazira	Al Ain
20:15		Report		Stadium: Hazza bin Zayed Stadium

== Final ==
4 May 2022
18:30

Al Ain	2–2	Shabab Al Ahli
Canedo 53'; Laba 75'	Report	Cartabia 28', 81'
Penalties
Guanca (penalty scored); Rahimi (penalty missed); Laba (penalty scored); Nader (penalty scored); Erik (penalty scored); Al Balochi (penalty scored)	5–4	(penalty scored) Olsen; (penalty missed) Jaber; (penalty scored) César; (penalty scored) Nourollahi; (penalty scored) Cartabia; (penalty missed) Haikal

Mohammed bin Zayed Stadium, Abu Dhabi
Referee: Mohamed Al Harmoodi

== Final Placements ==
Rank	Team
1	Al Ain
2	Shabab Al Ahli
3	Al Jazira
4	Al Wahda
5	Kalba
6	Al Wasl
7	Ajman
8	Al Nasr
9	Emirates
10	Sharjah
11	Al Urooba
12	Al Dhafra
13	Baniyas
14	Khor Fakkan
