= 2023 UAE Super Cup =

- Event: Super Cup
Shabab Al Ahli	Sharjah
AGL	Cup
6	2
- Date: 29 December 2023
- Venue: Al Maktoum Stadium, Dubai
- Referee: Sultan Abdulrazzaq
- Weather: Clear; 25 °C (77 °F) humidity 64%

The 2023 UAE Super Cup was the 16th professional and 22nd overall UAE Super Cup, an annual football match played between the winners of the previous season's Pro League and President's Cup. It was contested between Shabab Al Ahli and Sharjah, both clubs have previously faced each other in 2019 and 2020, Sharjah won the former on penalty shootout and Shabab Al Ahli won the latter with a scoreline of one to nothing. The match resulted with Shabab Al Ahli winning by a margin of six to two, ironically winning their sixth title on the process, with goals scored by five different players despite Sharjah leading the match with two goals.

== Details ==
29 December 2023
19:45

Shabab Al Ahli	6–2	Sharjah
Cartabia 36' (pen.), 43'; Al-Ghassani 45+5'; Mateusão 68'; Abdalla 79'; César 88'	Report	Camara 8'; Marega 26'

Al Maktoum Stadium, Dubai
Referee: Sultan Abdulrazzaq

Shabab Al Ahli	Sharjah

GK	12	(United Arab Emirates) Hassan Hamza (c)
CB	4	(United Arab Emirates) Mohammed Marzooq
RB	37	(United Arab Emirates) Ahmed Jamil
CB	13	(Brazil) Renan
AM	7	(United Arab Emirates) Harib Abdalla	(substituted off) 89'
MF	21	(United Arab Emirates) Tareq Ahmed	(yellow card) 73' (substituted off) 80'
RW	10	(Argentina) Federico Cartabia
MF	6	(Uzbekistan) Azizjon Ganiev
LW	11	(United Arab Emirates) Yahya Al-Ghassani	(substituted off) 89'
CF	77	(United Arab Emirates) Guilherme Bala	(substituted off) 74'
CF	19	(Brazil) Mateusão	(yellow card) 69' (substituted off) 73'
Substitutes:
DM	20	(United Arab Emirates) Yousif Jaber	(substituted on) 89'
GK	1	(United Arab Emirates) Jamal Al-Hosani
MF	57	(United Arab Emirates) Yuri César	(yellow card) 89' (substituted on) 74'
MF	30	(United Arab Emirates) Mohammed Jumaa
RB	23	(United Arab Emirates) Abdulaziz Haikal	(substituted on) 89'
CB	2	(United Arab Emirates) Salmeen Khamis
CB	50	(United Arab Emirates) Saeed Suleiman
MF	15	(United Arab Emirates) Abdullah Al-Naqbi	(substituted on) 80'
ST	99	(Brazil) Igor Jesus	(substituted on) 73'
Manager:
(Serbia) Marko Nikolić

GK	1	(United Arab Emirates) Adel Al-Hosani (c)
CB	18	(United Arab Emirates) Abdullah Ghanem	(yellow card) 73'
LB	15	(United Arab Emirates) Abdulaziz Al-Kaabi	(red card) 32'
LB	22	(Brazil) Marcus Meloni	(substituted off) 84'
CB	5	(Croatia) Maro Katinić	(substituted off) 46'
MF	10	(Bosnia and Herzegovina) Miralem Pjanić	(yellow card) 45'
DM	24	(United Arab Emirates) Majid Rashid	(substituted off) 78'
AM	27	(United Arab Emirates) Luanzinho	(substituted off) 49'
ST	91	(Mali) Moussa Marega	(substituted off) 46'
CF	7	(Brazil) Caio Lucas	(yellow card) 63' (yellow card) 90+2' (yellow-red card)
RW	30	(Guinea) Ousmane Camara
Substitutes:
CB	13	(United Arab Emirates) Salem Sultan
ST	12	(United Arab Emirates) Sebastián Tagliabúe
CB	6	(United Arab Emirates) Majed Suroor	(substituted on) 84'
LM	16	(United Arab Emirates) Khaled Ba Wazir
LB	3	(United Arab Emirates) Al Hassan Saleh	(substituted on) 78'
CB	44	(Greece) Kostas Manolas	(substituted on) 46'
GK	26	(United Arab Emirates) Darwish Bin Habib
MF	11	(Tunisia) Firas Ben Larbi	(yellow card) 90+4' (substituted on) 49'
RB	19	(United Arab Emirates) Khaled Ibrahim	(substituted on) 46'
Manager:
(Romania) Cosmin Olăroiu
