= Adel Al Chadli =

Swiss-Yemeni footballer (born 2000)

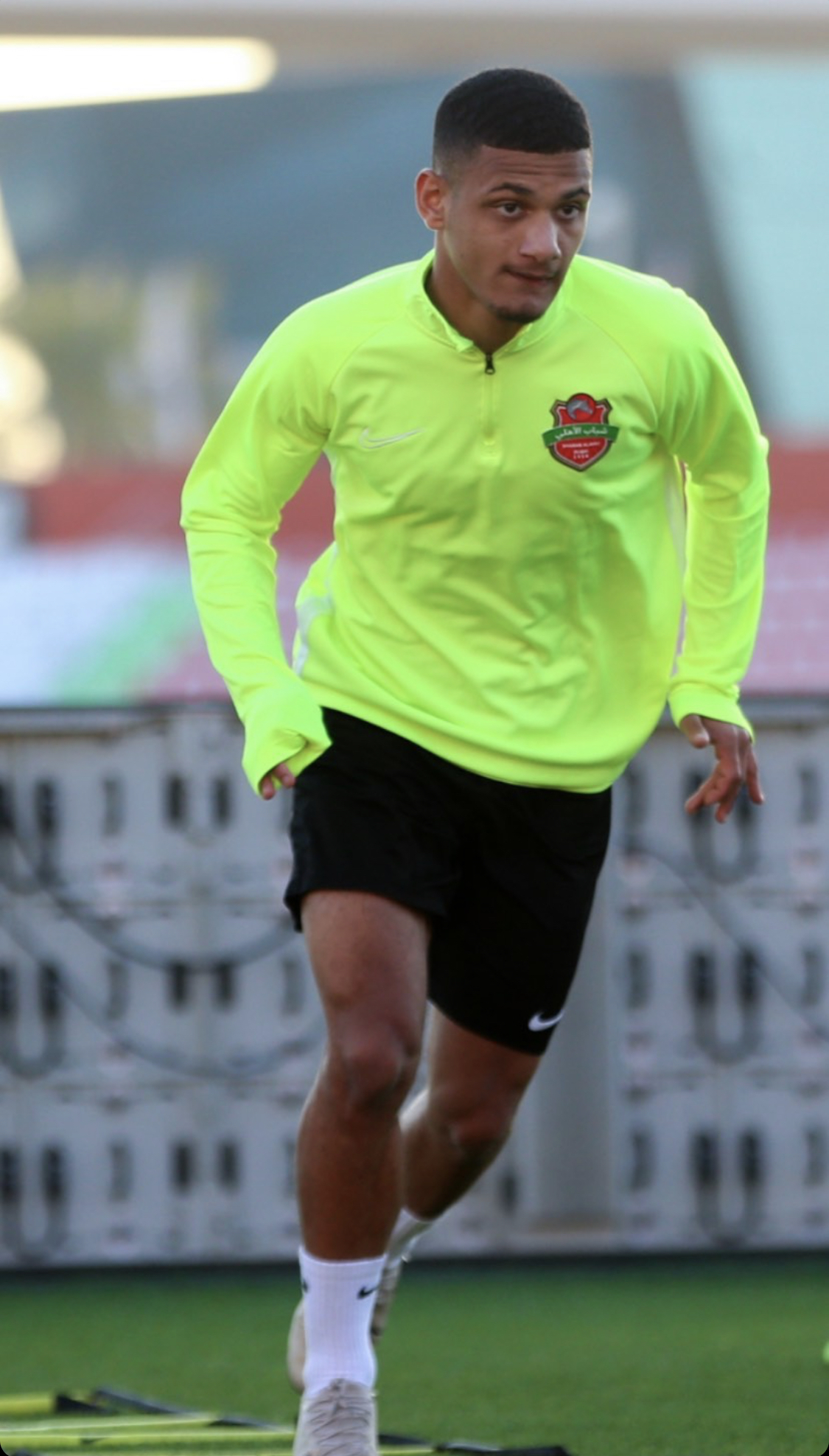
- Al Chadli in Shabab Al-Ahli training in 2020

Personal information
- Full name: Adel Wgdan Mahmood Al Chadli
- Date of birth: 13 April 2000 (age 26)
- Place of birth: Aden, Yemen
- Height: 1.71 m (5 ft 7 in)
- Position: Winger

Team information
- Current team: United

Youth career
- 2006–2013: Montreux-Sports
- 2014–2016: Al Ahli
- 2016: Lausanne-Sport
- 2016–2018: Sion

Senior career*
Years	Team	Apps	(Gls)
2018	Sion II	1	(0)
2018–2024	Shabab Al-Ahli	6	(0)
2022–2023	→ Ittihad Kalba (loan)	3	(0)
2024–2025	Emirates		
2025–2026	Al-Fujairah		
2026–	United	5	(2)
- * Club domestic league appearances and goals as of 15 September 2026

Adel Wgdan Mahmood Al Chadli (Arabic: عَادِل وَجْدَان مَحْمُود الشَّاذِلِيّ; born 13 April 2000) is a Yemeni footballer who plays for United as a winger.

== Early life ==
Al Chadli was born in Aden, Yemen, but moved to Switzerland as a child. He is the son of former South Yemen and Yemen international footballer Wagdan Shadli, while his brother, Wajd Al Chadli, also plays football, and formerly played for Sion.

== Club career ==
Al Chadli began his footballing career with Swiss side Montreux-Sports at the age of six, where he reportedly attracted offers from English side Manchester United, as well as French sides Olympique Lyonnais and Paris Saint-Germain. He spent a short period of time training with Lyon in 2012. In 2014, he moved to the United Arab Emirates to join Al Ahli. He returned to Switzerland and joined Lausanne-Sport for a short stint, before joining Sion, where he featured once for the club's reserve team in the 2017–18 season.

He returned to the United Arab Emirates in 2018, joining UAE Pro League side Shabab Al-Ahli Dubai. After impressive performances with Al-Ahli's youth teams, scoring twenty goals in forty-four games, he was invited to trial with Spanish side Barcelona in 2019.

The following year, after a handful of appearances for Al-Ahli, he suffered an injury to his right metatarsal, which required surgery in April 2021.

In August 2022, he signed with fellow UAE Pro League side Ittihad Kalba on a season-long loan.

== International career ==
Al Chadli was called up to the Switzerland under-18 team in 2018. In doing so, he became the first Yemeni footballer to become naturalised and feature for a European team.

== Career statistics ==
=== Club ===
As of 7 April 2023

Appearances and goals by club, season and competition
Club	Season	League			National Cup (Note: Includes Swiss Cup and UAE President's Cup)		League Cup (Note: Includes UAE League Cup)		Other		Total	
Club	Season	Division	Apps	Goals	Apps	Goals	Apps	Goals	Apps	Goals	Apps	Goals
Sion II	2017–18	Swiss Promotion League	1	0	0	0	–		0	0	1	0
Shabab Al-Ahli Dubai	2018–19	UAE Pro League	2	0	0	0	2	0	0	0	4	0
Shabab Al-Ahli Dubai	2019–20	UAE Pro League	4	0	0	0	3	0	0	0	7	0
Shabab Al-Ahli Dubai	2020–21	UAE Pro League	0	0	1	0	0	0	0	0	1	0
Shabab Al-Ahli Dubai	2021–22	UAE Pro League	0	0	0	0	0	0	0	0	0	0
Shabab Al-Ahli Dubai	Total		6	0	1	0	5	0	0	0	12	0
Ittihad Kalba (loan)	2022–23	UAE Pro League	3	0	0	0	1	0	0	0	4	0
Al-Fujairah	2025–26	UAE First Division	–		1	0	0	0	0	0	1	0
United	2026–27	UAE Pro League	5	2	0	0	0	0	0	0	5	2
Career total			15	2	2	0	6	0	0	0	23	2
