= 2026–27 UAE Pro League =

UAE Pro League دوري المحترفين الإماراتي
- Season: 2026–27
- Dates: 14 August 2026 – TBC
- Country: United Arab Emirates
- Teams: 14
- Goals: 117 (3.34 per match)
- Top goalscorer: 9 players (3 goals)
- Biggest home win: Al Wasl 5–1 United (15 August 2026)
- Biggest away win: Khor Fakkan 1–5 Shabab Al Ahli (15 August 2026)
- Highest scoring: Ajman 4–3 Hatta (22 August 2026); Al Wasl 5–2 Khor Fakkan (4 September 2026); Sharjah 4–3 United (5 September 2026)

The 2026–27 UAE Pro League (also known as ADNOC Pro League for sponsorship reasons) is the 52nd edition of the UAE Pro League. Al Ain are the defending champions.

== Teams ==
14 teams will compete in the league - the top 12 teams from the previous season and the 2 teams promoted from the 2025–26 UAE First Division League.

=== Team changes ===
Promoted from 2025–26 UAE First Division League	Relegated from 2025–26 UAE Pro League
Hatta; United	Al Bataeh; Dibba

=== Stadiums ===
Locations of teams in the 2026–27 UAE Pro League

Note: Table lists in alphabetical order.

Team	Location	Stadium	Capacity
Ajman	Ajman	Ajman Stadium	5,141
Al Ain	Al Ain	Hazza bin Zayed Stadium	25,965
Al Dhafra	Madinat Zayed	Al Dhafra Stadium	5,020
Al Jazira	Abu Dhabi	Mohammed bin Zayed Stadium	36,186
Al Nasr	Dubai	Al Maktoum Stadium	15,058
Al Wahda	Abu Dhabi	Al Nahyan Stadium	15,894
Al Wasl	Dubai	Zabeel Stadium	8,439
Baniyas	Abu Dhabi	Baniyas Stadium	6,927
Hatta	Hatta	Hamdan Bin Rashid Stadium	5,141
Kalba	Kalba	Ittihad Kalba Stadium	7,701
Khor Fakkan	Khor Fakkan	Saqr bin Mohammed Al Qasimi Stadium	6,132
Shabab Al Ahli	Dubai	Rashid Stadium	8,015
Sharjah	Sharjah	Sharjah Stadium	16,899
United	Dubai	Al Maktoum Stadium	15,058

=== Personnel and kits ===
Team	Manager	Captain	Kit manufacturer	Main sponsor
Ajman	(Serbia) Goran Tufegdžić	(United Arab Emirates) Ali Al-Hosani	Adidas	Ajman Bank
Al Ain	(Serbia) Vladimir Ivić	(United Arab Emirates) Khalid Eisa	Nike	First Abu Dhabi Bank
Al Dhafra	(France) Patrice Carteron	(United Arab Emirates) Abdullah Al-Karbi	Kelme	None
Al Jazira	(Romania) Cosmin Olăroiu	(United Arab Emirates) Ali Khasif	New Balance	Mubadala
Al Nasr	(Serbia) Miloš Milojević	(United Arab Emirates) Ahmed Shambih	Puma	Emirates Islamic
Al Wahda	(Brazil) Péricles Chamusca	(Syria) Omar Khribin	Adidas	LEAD Development
Al Wasl	(Portugal) Rui Vitória	(United Arab Emirates) Nicolás Giménez	Puma	HUNA Living
Baniyas	(United Arab Emirates) Hassan Al-Abdooli	(United Arab Emirates) Fawaz Awana	Macron	ADIB
Hatta	(Serbia) Aleksandar Ilić	(Tunisia) Firas Ben Larbi	Erreà	None
Kalba	(Spain) Víctor Sánchez	(Iran) Ahmad Nourollahi	Nike	Shurooq
Khor Fakkan	(Croatia) Krešimir Režić	(United Arab Emirates) Ahmed Al-Hosani	Macron	None
Shabab Al Ahli	(Brazil) André Jardine	(Argentina) Federico Cartabia	Nike	Nissan
Sharjah	(Portugal) José Morais	(United Arab Emirates) Shahin Abdulrahman	Adidas	SAIF Zone
United	(Italy) Andrea Pirlo	(Jordan) Othman Ramadan	Adidas	Secton

== Foreign players ==
All clubs can register foreigners as many as they want but can only include five professionals in each team rosters. Players under the age of 23 (U23) are not counted as professionals, and players who have received Emirati citizenship are deemed as local players.

- Players name in **bold** indicates the player is registered during the mid-season transfer window.
- Players in italics were out of the squad or left the club within the season, after the pre-season transfer window, or in the mid-season transfer window, and at least had one appearance.

Club	Player 1	Player 2	Player 3	Player 4	Player 5	Unregistered players	Former players
Ajman	(Brazil) Carlinhos	(Brazil) Jobson	(Brazil) Lourency	(Morocco) Walid Azaro	(North Macedonia) Gjoko Zajkov		
Al Ain	(Austria) Valentino Lazaro	(Egypt) Ramy Rabia	(Greece) Giorgos Giakoumakis	(Morocco) Soufiane Rahimi	(Paraguay) Kaku		
Al Dhafra	(Brazil) Samir	(Guinea) Sory Kaba	(Morocco) Karim El Berkaoui	(Morocco) Mohamed El Khaloui	(Senegal) Dominique Mendy	(Albania) Regi Lushkja	
Al Jazira	(Albania) Kristjan Asllani	(Angola) Felício Milson	(Brazil) Malcom	(Brazil) Talisca			(Democratic Republic of the Congo) Simon Banza
Al Nasr	(Australia) Ajdin Hrustic	(Iran) Mehdi Ghayedi	(Ivory Coast) Chris Bedia	(Norway) Marius Høibråten	(Romania) Marius Marin	(Serbia) Luka Milivojević	
Al Wahda	(Belgium) Christian Benteke	(Iran) Mohammad Ghorbani	(Mali) Moussa Diarra	(Slovenia) Adam Gnezda Čerin	(Syria) Omar Khribin		
Al Wasl	(Brazil) Matheus Saldanha	(Iran) Mehdi Taremi	(Morocco) Soufiane Bouftini	(Peru) Renato Tapia	(Switzerland) Cameron Puertas		
Baniyas	(Mali) Youssoufou Niakaté	(Nigeria) Saviour Godwin	(Sierra Leone) Alhassan Koroma	(Uzbekistan) Azizjon Ganiev			
Hatta	(Brazil) Bruno Leonardo	(Colombia) Sebastián Pedroza	(Lebanon) Mohamad Baker El Housseini	(Tunisia) Firas Ben Larbi	(Tunisia) Seifeddine Jaziri	(Haiti) Dominique Simon	
Kalba	(France) Ibrahim Cissé	(Germany) Koray Günter	(Ghana) Benjamin Tetteh	(Iran) Ahmad Nourollahi	(Iran) Saman Ghoddos		
Khor Fakkan	(Bolivia) Luis Haquín	(Jamaica) Junior Flemmings	(Morocco) Selim Amallah	(Morocco) Tarik Tissoudali	(Portugal) Aylton Boa Morte	(Bolivia) Ramiro Vaca	
Shabab Al Ahli	(Belgium) Wout Faes	(Iran) Saeid Ezatolahi	(Iran) Sardar Azmoun	(Portugal) Jorge Fernandes	(Serbia) Nemanja Maksimović		
Sharjah	(Brazil) Igor Coronado	(Cape Verde) Diney	(Democratic Republic of the Congo) Charles Pickel	(Togo) Kodjo Fo-Doh Laba			
United	(Cape Verde) Willy Semedo	(Gabon) Shavy Babicka	(Syria) Mahmoud Dahoud	(Senegal) Moustapha Name	(Switzerland) Haris Seferovic		

== League table ==
Pos	Team	Pld	W	D	L	GF	GA	GD	Pts	Qualification or relegation
1	Al Jazira	7	5	2	0	15	5	+10	17	Qualification for AFC Champions League Elite league stage
2	Sharjah	7	5	0	2	15	8	+7	15	Qualification for AFC Champions League Elite league stage
3	Al Ain	7	4	2	1	12	7	+5	14	Qualification for AFC Champions League Elite preliminary stage
4	Al Wasl	7	4	1	2	18	8	+10	13	Qualification for AFC Champions League Two group stage
5	Shabab Al Ahli	7	4	1	2	12	7	+5	13	
6	Al Wahda	7	4	1	2	9	7	+2	13	
7	Al Nasr	7	3	2	2	12	8	+4	11	
8	Ajman	7	3	1	3	12	15	−3	10	
9	Kalba	7	2	2	3	11	16	−5	8	
10	Khor Fakkan	7	2	1	4	9	16	−7	7	
11	United	7	2	1	4	14	22	−8	7	
12	Al Dhafra	7	2	0	5	9	13	−4	6	
13	Hatta	7	1	0	6	6	15	−9	3	Relegation to UAE Division 1
14	Baniyas	7	0	2	5	6	13	−7	2	Relegation to UAE Division 1

Updated to match(es) played on 8 November 2026. Source: Goal.com
Rules for classification: 1) Points; 2) Head-to-head points; 3) Head-to-head goal difference; 4) Head-to-head goals scored; 5) Goal difference; 6) Number of goals scored; 7) Disciplinary points; 8) Drawing of lots

=== Results ===
Home \ Away	AJM	AIN	JAZ	NAS	DHF	WAH	WAS	YAS	KAL	KHF	SAD	SHR	HAT	UFC
Ajman			0–3			2–0		1–1				1–3	4–3	
Al Ain				2–1			2–2	2–4	0–2	2–0	0–2			
Al Jazira	3–0			1–1			2–1		2–2		1–3	0–2	0–2	
Al Nasr	2–1	2–1	1–1						2–2				2–0	4–1
Al Dhafra									1–3	0–2	0–2	1–3	2–1	5–1
Al Wahda	2–3	0–0		1–0				2–1		3–2			0–2	
Al Wasl		2–2						2–0	0–3	5–2	0–1			5–1
Baniyas		2–4				1–2	0–2			0–0			0–1	2–3
Kalba		0–2	2–2	2–2			0–3							
Khor Fakkan		2–3			2–0	2–3	1–5	0–0						
Shabab Al Ahli		2–0	3–1		2–0		1–0			5–1				1–1
Sharjah	3–1		2–0		3–1						2–1		3–0	4–3
Hatta	3–4		0–2	0–2	1–2	2–0		1–0		1–2		0–3		
United					1–5		1–5	3–2	4–1		1–1	3–4		

Updated to match(es) played on 18 October 2026. Source: Scoresway
Legend: Blue = home team win; Yellow = draw; Red = away team win.
For upcoming matches, an "a" indicates there is an article about the rivalry between the two participants.
