= Khalfan Khalid =

Emirati association football player (born 2000)

Khalfan Khalid خلفان خالد
Personal information
- Full name: Khalfan Khalid Eissa Ahmed Kamil
- Date of birth: 14 August 2000 (age 26)
- Place of birth: Emirates
- Height: 1.70 m (5 ft 7 in)
- Position: Left back

Youth career
- Ajman

Senior career*
Years	Team	Apps	(Gls)
2020–2023	Ajman	3	(0)
- * Club domestic league appearances and goals as of 11:30, 30 December 2020 (UTC)

Khalfan Khalid (Arabic: خلفان خالد; born 14 August 2000) is an Emirati professional footballer who plays as a left back.

== Career statistics ==
=== Club ===
As of 30 December 2020.

Club	Season	League			Cup		Continental		Other		Total	
Club	Season	Division	Apps	Goals	Apps	Goals	Apps	Goals	Apps	Goals	Apps	Goals
Ajman	2020–21	UAE Pro League	3	0	0	0	—		—		3	0
Career totals			3	0	0	0	0	0	0	0	3	0
