= Dieu-Merci Michel =

Canadian soccer player

Personal information
- Full name: Dieu-Merci Ndembo Michel
- Date of birth: February 9, 2004 (age 22)
- Place of birth: Montreal, Quebec , Canada
- Height: 1.91 m (6 ft 3 in)
- Position: Forward

Team information
- Current team: United

Youth career
- 2015–2018: Edmonton BTB
- 2019: St. Albert Impact
- 2019–2021: Victoria Highlanders
- 2022–2023: Vitória Guimarães

Senior career*
Years	Team	Apps	(Gls)
2023–2025	Vitória Guimarães B	43	(11)
2024–2026	Vitória Guimarães	9	(2)
2025–2026	→ União Leiria (loan)	28	(4)
2026–	United	5	(0)
- * Club domestic league appearances and goals as of October 16, 2026

Dieu-Merci Ndembo Michel (born February 9, 2004) is a Canadian professional soccer player who plays as a forward for UAE Pro League club United.

== Early life ==
Michel moved from Montréal to Calgary as a child with his family, where they were homeless and sleeping on the floors of boxing gyms, later moving to Edmonton in 2014.

Michel played youth soccer in Canada with Edmonton BTB SC. In 2019, he was named to the Team Alberta squad for the Western Canada Summer Games. He later played with the St. Albert Impact and Victoria Highlanders. He later trained with Canadian clubs FC Edmonton and Pacific FC, and then 14 European sides including Belgian club Club Brugge and German club Bayern Munich. In 2022, he joined the U19 side of Portuguese club Vitória de Guimarães.

== Club career ==
In April 2022, he signed a professional contract with Portuguese club Vitória de Guimarães until 2024, where he would first play with the second team. He made his professional debut and scored his first goal on April 1, 2023. In September 2024, he re-signed through 2027. He scored his first goal for the first team, in his second appearance on January 3, 2025, in a 4–4 draw against Sporting CP. In August 2025, he was loaned to União de Leiria in Liga Portugal 2 for the 2025-26 season, with Leiria holding a purchase option.

In the summer of 2026, he transferred to UAE Pro League club United FC.

== International career ==
Born in Canada, Michel is of Angolan descent. In May 2022, he was named to the Canada U20 provisional roster for the 2022 CONCACAF U-20 Championship. In June 2023, he participated in training sessions with the Canada senior team.

== Career statistics ==
As of November 2, 2026

Club	Season	League			National cup		League cup		Continental		Total	
Club	Season	Division	Apps	Goals	Apps	Goals	Apps	Goals	Apps	Goals	Apps	Goals
Vitória de Guimarães B	2022–23	Liga 3	5	1	—		—		—		5	1
Vitória de Guimarães B	2023–24	Campeonato de Portugal	22	5	—		—		—		22	5
Vitória de Guimarães B	2024–25	Campeonato de Portugal	16	5	—		—		—		16	5
Vitória de Guimarães B	Total		43	11	—		—		—		43	11
Vitória de Guimarães	2024–25	Primeira Liga	9	2	1	1	0	0	1	0	11	3
União de Leiria (loan)	2025–26	Liga Portugal 2	28	4	5	1	0	0	—		33	5
United FC	2026–27	UAE Pro League	5	0	1	0	1	0	—		7	0
Career total			84	17	7	2	1	0	1	0	93	19
