= Kauan (disambiguation) =

Kauan may refer to:

- Kauan, Russian-Finnish rock/metal band
- Kauan Rodrigues da Silva (born 2005), Brazilian footballer
- Kauan Santos (born 2004), Brazilian footballer
