= Ahmad Jamil (footballer) =

Emirati professional footballer (born 1999)

Personal information
- Birth name: Ahmad Abdulla Jamil Abdulla Suroor
- Date of birth: January 16, 1999 (age 27)
- Place of birth: Dubai, UAE
- Height: 1.77 m (5 ft 9 1/2 in)
- Position: Right-back

Team information
- Current team: Shabab Al Ahli
- Number: 37

Youth career
- Shabab Al Ahli

Senior career*
Years	Team	Apps	(Gls)
2019–	Shabab Al Ahli	52	(1)

International career^{‡}
2018	United Arab Emirates U19	3	(0)
2022	United Arab Emirates U23	3	(0)
2022–	United Arab Emirates	10	(0)
- * Club domestic league appearances and goals as of 06:15, 10 January 2024 (UTC) ‡ National team caps and goals as of 23:00, 15 January 2024 (UTC)

Ahmad Abdulla Jamil Abdulla Suroor (Arabic: أَحْمَد عَبْد الله جَمِيل عَبْد الله سُرُور; born 16 January 1999) is an Emirati professional footballer who plays as a right-back for Shabab Al Ahli, and the United Arab Emirates national team.

== Club career ==
Jamil began his senior career with the UAE Pro League Shabab Al Ahli in 2019. His first trophy with the club was the 2020 UAE Super Cup, and the following season won the 2020–21 UAE President's Cup and the 2020–21 UAE League Cup. He also won the 2022–23 UAE Pro League and following 2023 UAE Super Cup. On 24 June 2023, he extended his contract with the club until 2028.

== International career ==
Jamil is a youth international for the United Arab Emirates, having first played for the United Arab Emirates U19s in 2018. He was called up to the United Arab Emirates U23s for the 2022 AFC U-23 Asian Cup.

Jalil debuted for the United Arab Emirates national team in a 1–0 friendly loss to Paraguay on 23 September 2022. He was called up to the national team for the 2023 AFC Asian Cup.

== Personal life ==
Jamil is the son of Abdulla Jamil, who was previously a goalkeeper for Shabab Al Ahli.

== Honours ==
Shabab Al Ahli

- UAE Pro League: 2022–23
- UAE President's Cup: 2020–21
- UAE League Cup: 2020–21
- UAE Super Cup: 2020, 2023
