= Guilherme Bala =

Brazilian footballer (born 2001)

Personal information
- Full name: Guilherme da Silva Gonçalves
- Date of birth: 16 September 2001 (age 25)
- Place of birth: Rio de Janeiro, Brazil
- Height: 1.78 m (5 ft 10 in)
- Position: Winger

Team information
- Current team: Shabab Al Ahli
- Number: 77

Youth career
- –2019: Madureira

Senior career*
Years	Team	Apps	(Gls)
2019–2020	Madureira	2	(0)
2019–2020	→ Flamengo (loan)	2	(0)
2020–2021	Ferroviária	5	(2)
2021–	Shabab Al Ahli	72	(13)

International career^{‡}
2026–	United Arab Emirates	4	(1)
- * Club domestic league appearances and goals as of 16 January 2025 ‡ National team caps and goals as of 6 October 2026

Guilherme da Silva Gonçalves (born 16 September 2001), commonly known as Guilherme Bala, is a professional footballer who plays for Shabab Al Ahli as a winger. Born in Brazil, he represents the United Arab Emirates national team.

== Career ==
In March 2019, Bala made his debut for Madureira against Flamengo.

On 5 September 2019, Bala signed for Flamengo on loan until 2021. Due to his form, he was selected to be part of the squad that would compete in the 2020 Taça Guanabara. In September 2020, due to a covid outbreak in the Flamengo squad, Bala was called up to play in a Copa Libertadores game against Barcelona S.C..

Although it was reported that Flamengo would purchase Bala the club did not take up the purchase option and he returned to Madureira.

On 5 April 2021, Bala was announced at Ferroviária on a four year contract. In July 2021, it was confirmed by head coach Elano that Bala would be leaving the club.

On 29 July 2021, Bala was announced at Shabab Al Ahli. On 11 January 2022, he scored his first goal for the club against Khor Fakkan, with Bala also assisting in the game. On 29 December 2023, Bala won the 2023 UAE Super Cup with the club, assisting the third goal scored by Mateusão.

== International career ==
On 27 July 2019, Bala was called up to the Brazilian under-20 national team to train between July 29th and August 5th.

Bala was called up to the United Arab Emirates national team in March 2026 for an internal training camp in Abu Dhabi. He made his international debut on 26 March 2026 in a friendly match against UAE club Al Wahda at Zayed Sports City Stadium.

== Style of play ==
Bala describes himself as having "strength and speed on the field" which is where his nickname, Guilherme Bala, comes from. His football inspirations are Zico, Éverton Ribeiro, Eden Hazard and Lionel Messi.

== Career statistics ==
=== Club ===
As of 16 January 2025.

Club	Season	League			State league		Cup		Continental		Other		Total	
Club	Season	Division	Apps	Goals	Apps	Goals	Apps	Goals	Apps	Goals	Apps	Goals	Apps	Goals
Madureira	2019	–			2 (Note: Appearance(s) in Campeonato Carioca.)	0	0	0	–		2 (Note: Appearance(s) in Copa Rio.)	0	4	0
Madureira	2020	–			0	0	0	0	–		0	0	0	0
Madureira	2021	Série D	0	0	0	0	0	0	–		0	0	0	0
Madureira	Total		0	0	2	0	0	0	0	0	2	0	4	0
Flamengo	2019	Série A	0	0	0	0	0	0	0	0	0	0	0	0
Flamengo	2020	Série A	1	0	1	0	0	0	1 (Note: Appearance(s) in Copa Libertadores.)	0	0	0	3	0
Flamengo	Total		1	0	1	0	0	0	1	0	0	0	3	0
Ferroviária	2021	Série B	5	2	3	0	0	0	0	0	0	0	8	2
Shabab Al Ahli	2021-22	UPL	6	1	–		–		–		1	0	7	1
Shabab Al Ahli	2022-23	UPL	15	2	–		1	0	–		2	1	18	3
Shabab Al Ahli	2023-24	UPL	23	6	–		–		–		3	0	26	6
Shabab Al Ahli	2024-25	UPL	11	2	–		1	0	6	1	5	2	23	5
Shabab Al Ahli	Total		55	11	0	0	2	0	6	1	11	3	74	15
Career total			61	13	3	0	2	0	1	0	19	4	86	17

=== International ===
As of match played 6 October 2026

Appearances and goals by national team and year
National team	Year	Apps	Goals
United Arab Emirates	2026	4	1
Total		4	1

=== International goals ===
List of international goals scored by Guilherme Bala
No.	Date	Venue	Cap	Opponent	Score	Result	Competition
1.	27 September 2026	Prince Abdullah Al-Faisal Sports City Stadium, Jeddah, Saudi Arabia	1	Bahrain	2–0	3–0	27th Arabian Gulf Cup

== Honours ==
=== Club ===
Flamengo

- Campeonato Brasileiro Série A: 2020
