= United FC (Dubai) =

Emirati football club

United
- Full name: United Football Club Dubai
- Nickname: The Lions
- Founded: 1 September 2022; 4 years ago
- Stadium: Al-Maktoum Stadium
- Capacity: 15,058
- Owner: Ilie Cebanu
- President: Ilie Cebanu
- Head coach: Andrea Pirlo
- League: UAE Pro League
- 2025–26: UAE First Division League, 2nd (promoted)
- Website: utdfc.ae
Home colours	Away colours	Third colours

United Football Club (Arabic: نادي يونايتد لكرة القدم), commonly referred to as United or Dubai United, is an Emirati professional football club that was founded in September 2022 in Dubai. They currently play in the UAE Pro League, having been promoted from the UAE First Division in the 2025–26 season.

== History ==
=== Founding ===
The club was founded in September 2022. It began its journey in UAE Second Division.

=== 2022–23 Season ===
United FC did everything to get the promotion to UAE First Division League. The club invited some new players and coaches, who created new tactics for the team. The management set high goals and the team started showing great performance.

United FC became one of the favorites to be promoted. However, the end of the season was quite dramatic. Three clubs: Gulf United FC, Fleetwood United F.C. and United FC had the chance to play in UAE First Division League in the following season. The last two games were really important for United FC, where the club beat Fleetwood United F.C. and Al-Hilal United FC.

United FC finished the season in the 2nd place with the best offensive and defensive rating in the league. The club started and finished the second half of the season without losing any game.

=== International Summer Camp ===
After the promotion, United FC had several friendly games against local clubs from UAE Pro League. The team showed its best against the 2022–23 champions Shabab Al Ahli Club, the club with the most championships Al Ain FC and 2023 cup champions Sharjah FC.

In June 2023 the club went to Moldova and spent the summer camp at the football base of FC Sheriff Tiraspol. United FC had some friendly matches against some professional Moldovan teams, such as Milsami Orhei, FC Petrocub Hîncești, CSF Bălți, FC Florești, Moldova national under-19 football team, FC Saxan and FC Dinamo-Auto Tiraspol.

After the summer camp, the team went back to Dubai and continued its preparation for the UAE First Division League. The club played a friendly game against Turkmenistan national football team in October 2023. In early January 2024, United FC played another friendly match versus Latvian team, Riga FC.

=== First Division League UAE ===
During the transfer window before 2023-24 season a lot of changes were made. The new technical director Jean Marc Nobilo came. Also a lot of notable French specialists began working with United FC. The club also signed Marcelo Torres, Lucas Lima and Imade Osarenkhoe. Also, United FC extended the contracts of Pape Gueye, who is the best goalscorer of the UAE Second Division League 2022–23 and Moussa Ouedraogo who was chosen the MVP of United FC by the team. United finished the season on the 6th place in the First Division, while Marcelo Torres has become the top scorer, scoring 26 goals.

Quincy Promes and Adrien Silva were signed in the beginning of the 2025–26 season. The season started with the victory against Gulf United FC in UAE President Cup tournament, however in the following round United was eliminated by Al Dhafra FC. The club finished 4th in the UAE First Division League and couldn't get a promotion to the UAE Pro League. At the same season, United FC II (second team) has won the UAE Third Division League and got promoted to the Second Division.

For 2025–26 season, United FC appointed Andrea Pirlo as a manager, who was joined by Roberto Baronio and Mauro Bertoni as assistant coaches. Players like Quincy Promes, Adrien Silva and Marcelo Torres left the club, however United FC signed Haris Seferovic, Gian Marco Ferrari and Habib Al Fardan. The club's academy has appointed Luca Antonini as a Technical Director and has joined UAE FA National League in categories U10 and U12.

In 2025–26 campaign of UAE President's Cup, United FC has reached semi-final, where the club was eliminated by Al Ain FC. In order to reach this stage, United FC has won against two clubs from UAE Pro League: Sharjah FC and Al Wahda FC. In the same season the club has achieved promotion to the UAE Pro League by finishing 2nd in First Division.

=== 2026–27: UAE Pro League debut ===
Ahead of its first UAE Pro League campaign, United FC held a summer training camp in Riga, Latvia, followed by a camp in Geinberg, Austria, where the team played friendly matches against FC Red Bull Salzburg on 26 July and LASK on 29 July 2026. Among the new signings were Shavy Babicka, who joined on loan from Red Star Belgrade, and Dieu-Merci Michel. With the promotion, the club moved its home matches to Al-Maktoum Stadium, while keeping ISD Stadium Pitch in Dubai Sports City as its training base. In August 2026 forward Samuel Pedro left the club for Latvian side Riga FC.

United FC played its first-ever UAE Pro League match on 15 August 2026, losing 5–1 away to Al Wasl at Zabeel Stadium. The club recorded its first top-flight win a week later, beating Baniyas 3–2 away on 23 August, and won its first home match at Al-Maktoum Stadium 4–1 against Kalba on 28 August. A 4–3 defeat at Sharjah on 5 September left the team with six points from its first four matches.

== Reserve team and academy ==
United FC II, the club's reserve team (U23), competes in the UAE Second Division League after winning the UAE Third Division League and earning promotion. The club's academy, based in Dubai Sports City, fields teams in the UAE FA National League youth categories.

== Kit and sponsors ==
For the 2026–27 season, the club's first with kit manufacturer Adidas, the home kit is black with orange trim, the away kit features white and sky-blue stripes, and the third kit is orange with black trim.

Period	Kit manufacturer	Shirt sponsor
2022–2023	Uhlsport	
2023–2024	Jako	ISD Sports Science
2024–2026	Puma	ISD Padel (24-25) / LaFamiglia (25-26)
2026–	Adidas	Secton

== Season-by-season record ==
Season	League	Position	President's Cup	League Cup
2022–23	Second Division	2nd (promoted)	—	—
2023–24	First Division	6th	—	—
2024–25	First Division	4th	Round of 32	—
2025–26	First Division	2nd (promoted)	Semi-final	—
2026–27	UAE Pro League			

== Managerial history ==
Name	Nationality	From	To
Andrea Pirlo	Italy	June 2025	present

== Partnerships ==
In the summer of 2023, United FC signed the partnership deal with ISD Dubai Sports City. The ISD Stadium Pitch, located in Dubai Sports City, served as the club's home ground until the promotion to the UAE Pro League and remains its training base. Football legends, Marco Materazzi and Luca Antonini, attended the first home game in 2023–2024 season.

Since the 2026–27 season, United FC plays its home matches at Al-Maktoum Stadium.

For the 2026–27 season the club's partners are Secton (main partner), Radio Volna 103.2 (media partner), Almal, Fix Price and La Famiglia (official partners).

== Current squad ==
Note: Flags indicate national team as defined under FIFA eligibility rules; some limited exceptions apply. Players may hold more than one non-FIFA nationality.

No.	Pos.	Nation	Player
1	GK	UAE	Salam Khairi
2	DF	BFA	Nagoro Dao
3	DF	JOR	Othman Ramadan
4	DF	PLE	Sultan Abu Daken
5	MF	MAR	Aniss Karimi
6	MF	UAE	Majed Suroor (on loan from Al-Sharjah)
7	FW	SEN	Pape Guèye
8	MF	MLI	Baidy Diakite
9	FW	SUI	Haris Seferovic
10	FW	CPV	Willy Semedo
13	GK	PAK	Inayatullah Noor
17	FW	CAN	Dieu-Merci Michel
19	DF	UAE	Hamid Yahya
21	MF	SYR	Mahmoud Dahoud
22	MF	UAE	Mohammed Yousuf
23	MF	GHA	Jonas Naafo
25	MF	SEN	Moustapha Name
26	GK	SRB	Stojan Leković

No.	Pos.	Nation	Player
29	FW	CMR	Cédrick Nana
30	MF	YEM	Adel Al Chadli
44	DF	RUS	Khalid Ali
49	FW	MAR	El Mehdi Maouhoub (on loan from Dynamo Moscow)
50	GK	UAE	Moosa Al-Balooshi
52	DF	UAE	Hussain Abbas
55	GK	UAE	Rashed Salem
66	DF	UAE	Kouame Autonne (on loan from Al-Ain)
73	DF	BRA	Marcos Souza
77	DF	UAE	Bander Al-Ahbabi
78	MF	UAE	Khalil Ibrahim (on loan from Al-Dhafra)
80	FW	GAB	Shavy Babicka (on loan from Red Star Belgrade)
88	MF	UAE	Habib Al Fardan
93	DF	EGY	Seif Atef

=== Out on loan ===
Note: Flags indicate national team as defined under FIFA eligibility rules; some limited exceptions apply. Players may hold more than one non-FIFA nationality.

No.	Pos.	Nation	Player
—	MF	CGO	Durma Maniongui (on loan to Al Orooba)

Players with Multiple Nationalities

- (United Arab Emirates) (Ghana) Jonas Naafo
- (Yemen) (Switzerland) Adel Al Chadli

== Personnel ==
=== Current Technical Staff ===
Position	Staff
Head coach	(Italy) Andrea Pirlo
Assistant Coach	(Italy) Roberto Baronio
Assistant Coach	(Italy) Mauro Bertoni
Fitness Coach / Head of Performance	(Italy) Roberto De Bellis
Video Analyst	(Italy) Simone Di Martino
Goalkeeper Coach	(Slovenia) Dino Šeremet
Team Doctor	(Spain) Jose Manuel Bueno Padilla
Head Physiotherapist	(Croatia) Bojan Radanovic
Rehabilitation Coach	(Croatia) Ivo Duilo

=== Management ===
Position	Staff
President	(Moldova) Ilie Cebanu
Chief Operating Officer	(Ukraine) Igor Bartyan
First Team Manager	(United Arab Emirates) Mohammad Qassim

== Honours ==
- UAE First Division League
  - Promotion (1): 2025–26
- UAE Second Division League
  - Promotion (1): 2022–23

== Notable players ==
Had international caps for their respective countries. Players whose name is listed in bold represented their countries while playing for United.

- (Portugal) Adrien Silva
- (Netherlands) Quincy Promes
- (Switzerland) Haris Seferovic
- (Italy) Gian Marco Ferrari
- (Senegal) Moustapha Name
- (United Arab Emirates) Saif Rashid
- (United Arab Emirates) Fares Jumaa
- (United Arab Emirates) Tareq Ahmed
- (United Arab Emirates) Habib Al Fardan
- (United Arab Emirates) Ahmad Malalla
- (United Arab Emirates) Bander Al-Ahbabi
- (United Arab Emirates) Khalil Ibrahim
- (Oman) Hamid Al-Jabri
- (Gabon) Shavy Babicka

== See also ==
- List of football clubs in the United Arab Emirates
