= Aleksandar Vasiljević (footballer, born 2001) =

Serbian football player

Personal information
- Full name: Aleksandar Vasiljević
- Date of birth: 29 August 2001 (age 25)
- Place of birth: Zemun, FR Yugoslavia
- Height: 1.92 m (6 ft 4 in)
- Position: Centre-back

Team information
- Current team: Ajman
- Number: 16

Youth career
- –2019: Zemun

Senior career*
Years	Team	Apps	(Gls)
2019–2020	Zemun	27	(1)
2020–2021	Metalac Gornji Milanovac	49	(2)
2021–2024	Al-Wasl	32	(1)
2024–	Ajman	10	(0)
- * Club domestic league appearances and goals as of 24 June 2025

Aleksandar Vasiljević (Serbian Cyrillic: Александар Васиљевић; born 29 August 2001) is a Serbian professional football centre-back who plays for Ajman.
