= Mohammed Saif =

Emirati footballer (born 1993)

Personal information
- Date of birth: 22 June 1993 (age 33)
- Place of birth: United Arab Emirates
- Height: 1.73 m (5 ft 8 in)
- Position: Left-back

Youth career
- Al-Wahda

Senior career*
Years	Team	Apps	(Gls)
2013–2019	Al-Wahda	15	(0)
2017–2018	→ Baniyas (loan)		
2018–2019	→ Dibba Al-Fujairah (loan)	12	(0)
2019–2023	Al Dhafra	31	(3)
2023	→ Ajman (loan)	1	(0)
- * Club domestic league appearances and goals

Mohammed Saif (Arabic: محمد سيف; born 22 June 1993) is an Emirati footballer who plays as a left back.
