= Yousef Ahmed Safar =

Emirati association football player (born 1989)

Yousef Ahmed يوسف أحمد
Personal information
- Full name: Yousef Ahmed Safar Shah Al-Bloushi
- Date of birth: 17 May 1989 (age 37)
- Place of birth: United Arab Emirates
- Height: 1.80 m (5 ft 11 in)
- Position: Goalkeeper

Team information
- Current team: Ajman Club
- Number: 30

Youth career
- Dubai

Senior career*
Years	Team	Apps	(Gls)
2010–2017	Dubai	9	(0)
2018–	Ajman Club	1	(0)
- * Club domestic league appearances and goals

Yousef Ahmed Safar (Arabic: يوسف أحمد صفر; born May 17, 1989) is an Emirati footballer who plays as a goalkeeper for Ajman Club.
