= Shavy Babicka =

Gabonese footballer

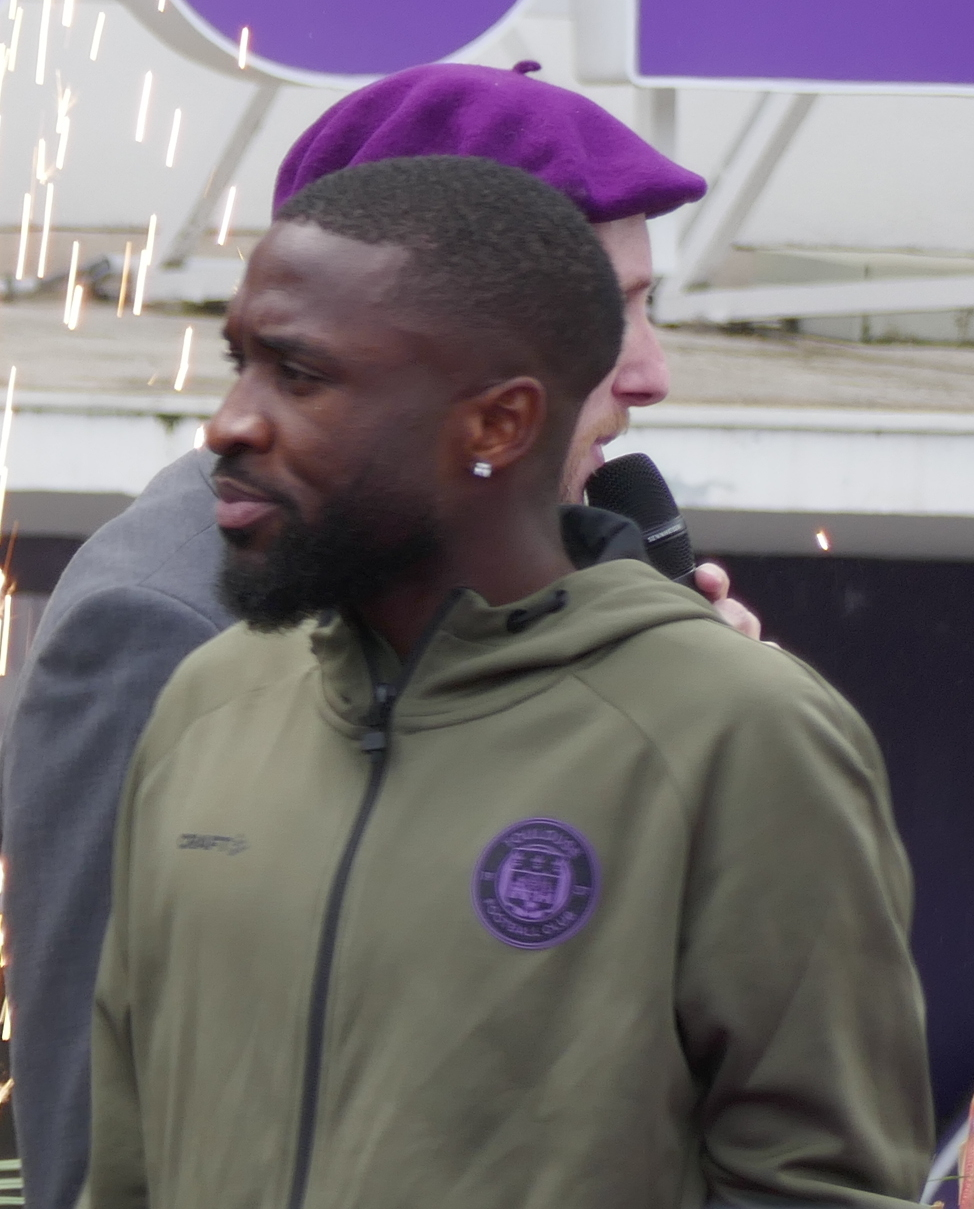
- Babicka in 2024

Personal information
- Full name: Shavy Warren Babicka
- Date of birth: 1 June 2000 (age 26)
- Place of birth: Libreville, Gabon
- Height: 1.79 m (5 ft 10 in)
- Position: Winger

Team information
- Current team: United FC (loan)
- Number: 80

Senior career*
Years	Team	Apps	(Gls)
2018	Mangasport	14	(2)
2018–2021	Kiyovu	49	(8)
2021–2024	Aris Limassol	75	(12)
2024–2025	Toulouse	42	(5)
2025–	Red Star Belgrade	2	(0)
2026	→ Fatih Karagümrük (loan)	15	(1)
2026	→ United FC (loan)	5	(2)

International career^{‡}
2022–	Gabon	24	(3)
- * Club domestic league appearances and goals as of 10 September 2026 ‡ National team caps and goals as of 29 September 2026

Shavy Warren Babicka (born 1 June 2000) is a Gabonese professional footballer who plays as a winger for UAE Pro League club United FC on loan from Red Star Belgrade and the Gabon national team.

== Club career ==
=== Mangasport ===
Babicka began his senior career in his native Gabon with Mangasport.

=== Kiyovu ===
From 2018 to 2021, he played in Rwanda with Kiyovu.

=== Aris Limassol ===
On 5 August 2021, Babicka transferred to the Cypriot club Aris Limassol, together with his compatriot Alex Moucketou-Moussounda. He scored four goals and made six assists in the 2021–22 season in Cyprus, and was nominated as one of the best attacking players of the season.

=== Toulouse ===
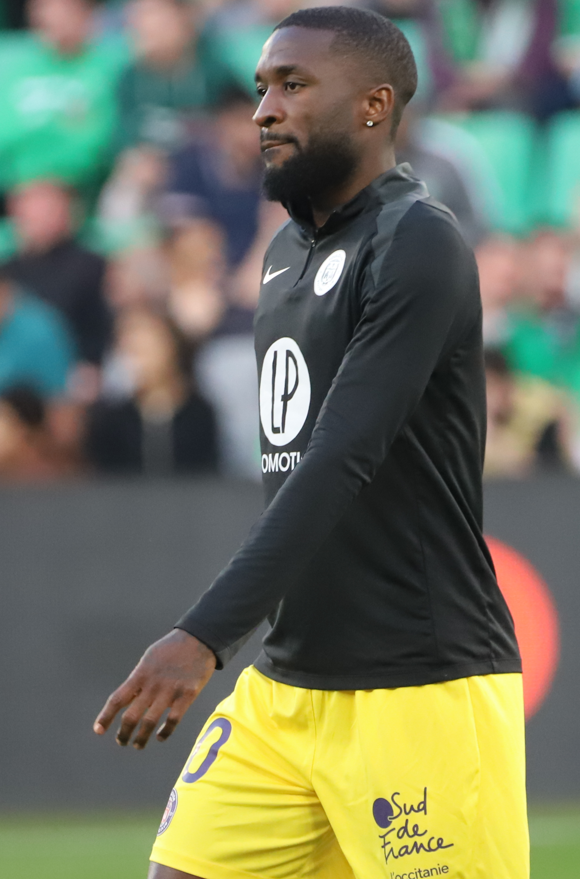
Babicka with Toulouse in 2025

On 14 January 2024, Aris Limassol announced Babicka's transfer to French club Toulouse for a fee of €2.75 million, which was the record high fee received by Aris.

=== Red Star Belgrade ===
On 2 August 2025, Red Star Belgrade announced that had reached an agreement with Babicka on a three-year deal, with an option for one more year.

== International career ==
Babicka was called up to the Gabon national team for a set of 2023 Africa Cup of Nations qualification matches in June 2022. He debuted with Gabon in a 1–0 win over DR Congo on 3 June 2022, scoring the game-winning goal.

== Career statistics ==
=== Club ===
As of match played 10 September 2026

Appearances and goals by club, season and competition
Club	Season	League			Cup		Europe		Other		Total	
Club	Season	Division	Apps	Goals	Apps	Goals	Apps	Goals	Apps	Goals	Apps	Goals
Aris Limassol	2021–22	Cypriot First Division	28	3	1	0	—		—		29	3
Aris Limassol	2022–23	Cypriot First Division	35	7	1	0	1 (Note: Appearances in UEFA Europa Conference League)	0	—		37	7
Aris Limassol	2023–24	Cypriot First Division	12	1	0	0	11 (Note: Four appearances and one goal in UEFA Champions League, seven appearances and three goals in UEFA Europa League)	4	1 (Note: Appearance in Cypriot Super Cup)	0	22	5
Aris Limassol	Total		73	11	2	0	12	4	1	0	88	15
Toulouse	2023–24	Ligue 1	12	1	1	0	2 (Note: Appearances in UEFA Europa League)	0	—		15	1
Toulouse	2024–25	Ligue 1	30	4	0	0	0	0	—		30	4
Toulouse	Total		42	5	1	0	2	0	—		45	5
Red Star Belgrade	2025–26	Serbian SuperLiga	2	0	0	0	4 (Note: Appearances in UEFA Champions League)	0	—		6	0
Red Star Belgrade	2026–27	Serbian SuperLiga	0	0	0	0	0	0	—		0	0
Red Star Belgrade	Total		2	0	0	0	4	0	—		6	0
Fatih Karagümrük (loan)	2025–26	Süper Lig	15	1	1	0	—		—		16	1
United FC (loan)	2026–27	UAE Pro League	5	2	—		—		—		5	2
Career total			127	19	4	0	18	4	1	0	150	23

=== International ===
As of match played 29 September 2026

Appearances and goals by national team and year
National team	Year	Apps	Goals
Gabon	2022	3	1
Gabon	2023	6	0
Gabon	2024	8	2
Gabon	2025	4	0
Gabon	2026	3	0
Total		24	3

Scores and results list Gabon's goal tally first, score column indicates score after each Babicka goal.

List of international goals scored by Shavy Babicka
No.	Date	Venue	Opponent	Score	Result	Competition	Ref.
1	4 June 2022	Stade des Martyrs, Kinshasa, DR Congo	DR Congo	1–0	1–0	2023 Africa Cup of Nations qualification	
2	10 September 2024	Stade de Franceville, Franceville, Gabon	Central African Republic	2–0	2–0	2025 Africa Cup of Nations qualification	
3	15 October 2024	Moses Mabhida Stadium, Durban, South Africa	Lesotho	1–0	2–0	2025 Africa Cup of Nations qualification	
