= 2024–25 UAE President's Cup =

Tournament details
- Country: United Arab Emirates
- Dates: 18 September 2024 – 2 June 2025
- Teams: 30

Final positions
- Champions: Shabab Al Ahli (11th title)
- Runners-up: Sharjah
- Champions League Elite: Shadab Al Ahli

Tournament statistics
- Matches played: 28
- Goals scored: 66 (2.36 per match)

The 2024–25 UAE President's Cup is the 48th edition of the UAE President's Cup. The winner qualified to the group stage of the 2025–26 AFC Champions League Elite.

== Preliminary rounds ==
All times are local (UTC+04:00)

=== Brackets ===
Round 1
21 Sept –
Al Dhaid	1 (6)
Al Hamriyah	1 (7)
21 Sept – Al Hamra Stadium
Fujairah	2
Fleetwood United	0
21 Sept – Emirates Club Stadium
Emirates Club	0
Masfout Club	1
21 Sept – Mirdif
Gulf	1
Dibba Al Fujairah	3

Round 2
27 Sept – Al Hamriya Sports Club Stadium
Al Hamriyah	2
Fujairah	0
27 Sept – Masfout Club Stadium
Masfout	0
Dibba Al Fujairah	2

Final play offs
1 Oct – Al Hamriya Sports Club Stadium
Al Hamriyah	2
Dibba Al Fujairah	3

Round 1
21 Sept – Hamdan bin Rashid Stadium
Hatta	3
Al Arabi	2
21 Sept – Al Hamra Stadium
Al Jazirah Al Hamra	1 (5)
Al Hamriyah	1 (4)
21 Sept – Dubai Sports City Stadium
Dubai United	2
Gulf United	0

Round 2
27 Sept – Hamdan bin Rashid Stadium
Hatta	0
Al Jazirah Al Hamra	0
27 Sept – Al Dhafra Stadium
Al Dhafra	1
Dubai United	0

Final play offs
1 Oct – Hamdan bin Rashid Stadium
Hatta	1 (6)
Al Dhafra	1 (5)

=== First round ===
20 September 2024	Fujairah	2–0	Fleetwood United	Fujairah
17:25	Durbant 50'; Radovanović 87'	Report		Stadium: Fujairah Club Stadium

20 September 2024	Emirates Club	0–1	Masfout Club	Ras Al Khaimah
17:25		Report	Ali Ibrahim 90+2'	Stadium: Emirates Club Stadium

20 September 2024	Gulf	1–3	Dibba Al Fujairah	Mirdif
17:30	Sossal 57'	Report	de Barros 3'; Mohamed 41'; Al Mansouri 89'

20 September 2024	Al Dhaid (2)	1–1 (6–7 p)	Al Hamriyah (2)	Dhaid
16:35

21 September 2024	Hatta	3–2	Al Arabi	Hatta
20:20				Stadium: Hamdan bin Rashid Stadium

21 September 2024	Al Jazirah Al Hamra	1–1 (5–4 p)	Al Hamriyah	Al Jazira Al Hamra
17:20				Stadium: Al Hamra Stadium

21 September 2024	Dubai United	2–0	Gulf United	Al Hebiah, Dubai
17:05				Stadium: Dubai Sports City Stadium

=== Second round ===
27 September 2024	Al Hamriyah (2)	2–0	Fujairah	Al Hamriyah
17:40				Stadium: Al Hamriya Sports Club Stadium

27 September 2024	Masfout	0–2	Dibba Al Fujairah	Masfout
17:05				Stadium: Masfout Club Stadium

27 September 2024	Hatta	3–0	Al Jazirah Al Hamra	Hatta
20:20				Stadium: Hamdan bin Rashid Stadium

27 September 2024	Al Dhafra	1–0	Dubai United	Madinat Zayed
17:25				Stadium: Al Dhafra Stadium

=== Final play offs ===
1 October 2024	Al Hamriyah (2)	1–2	Dibba Al Fujairah	Al Hamriyah
17:40				Stadium: Al Hamriya Sports Club Stadium

1 October 2024	Hatta	0–0 (6–5 p)	Al Dhafra	Hatta
20:20				Stadium: Hamdan bin Rashid Stadium

== Knockout round ==
=== Bracket ===
Round of 16
Dibba Al Fujairah	0
Baniyas	1
Al-Nasr SC (Dubai)	0
Sharjah	2
Hatta	0
Al Ain	4
Al Jazira	1
Al Urooba	0
Al Wasl	3
Al Wahda	1
Al Bataeh	0
Kalba	3
Dibba Al Hisn	0
Shabab Al Ahli	2
Ajman	2
Khor Fakkan	1

Quarter-finals
Baniyas	0
Sharjah	1
Al Ain	0
Al Jazira	1
Al Wasl	2
Kalba	0
Shabab Al Ahli	2
Ajman	1

Semi-finals
Sharjah	3
Al Jazira	1
Al Wasl	0
Shabab Al Ahli	1

Final
Sharjah	1
Shabab Al Ahli	2

=== Final ===
9 May 2025	Sharjah	1–2	Shabab Al Ahli	Al Nahyan, Abu Dhabi
19:25				Stadium: Mohammed bin Zayed Stadium; Referee: François Letexier (France)
