= Khaled Al-Senani =

Emirati footballer (born 1989)

Personal information
- Date of birth: 4 October 1989 (age 37)
- Place of birth: United Arab Emirates
- Height: 1.80 m (5 ft 11 in)
- Position: Goalkeeper

Youth career
- Al Jazira

Senior career*
Years	Team	Apps	(Gls)
2010–2018	Al Jazira	25	(0)
2012–2013	→ Al Dhafra (loan)	14	(0)
2018–2023	Al Dhafra	67	(0)
2022–2023	→ Al Wasl (loan)	26	(0)
2023–2026	Al Wasl	56	(0)

International career
2017–	United Arab Emirates	1	(0)
- * Club domestic league appearances and goals

Khaled Saif Hamad Ali Al-Senani (Arabic: خالد سيف حماد علي السناني; born 4 October 1989) is an Emirati footballer who plays as a goalkeeper.
