= Lithierry Silva =

Emirati footballer

Personal information
- Full name: Lithierry da Silva Neves
- Date of birth: 14 May 2001 (age 25)
- Place of birth: Leme, Brazil
- Height: 1.80 m (5 ft 11 in)
- Position: Winger

Team information
- Current team: Ajman
- Number: 33

Youth career
- Lemense
- 2018–2019: Corinthians

Senior career*
Years	Team	Apps	(Gls)
2019–2024	Emirates Club	103	(39)
2024–	Ajman	27	(4)

International career
2025–	United Arab Emirates	1	(0)
- * Club domestic league appearances and goals as of 3 June 2025

Lithierry da Silva Neves (Arabic: ليذييري سيلفا; born 14 May 2001), simply known as Litherry, is a professional footballer who plays as a winger for UAE Pro League club Ajman. Born in Brazil, he plays for the United Arab Emirates national team.

== Professional career ==
Lithierry Silva is a product of the youth academy of the Brazilian clubs Lemense and Corinthians. In 2019, he moved to the Emirati club Emirates Club where he signed his first professional contract. In 2024 he transferred to Ajman Club. He was nominated for the "Best U23 player" for the 2024–25 season in the UAE Pro League.

== International career ==
Born in Brazil, Lithierry Silva emigrated to the United Arab Emirates and was naturalized as an Emirati citizen in June 2025. He debuted with the United Arab Emirates national team in a 1–1 2026 FIFA World Cup qualification tie with Kyrgyzstan on 10 June 2025.
