= David Petrović =

Serbian footballer

Personal information
- Full name: David Petrović
- Date of birth: 14 March 2003 (age 23)
- Place of birth: Čačak, Serbia and Montenegro
- Height: 1.84 m (6 ft 0 in)
- Position: Left back

Team information
- Current team: Al-Nasr
- Number: 55

Youth career
- –2021: Red Star Belgrade
- 2019–2021: → Grafičar (youth loan)

Senior career*
Years	Team	Apps	(Gls)
2021–2022	Red Star Belgrade	0	(0)
2021–2022	→ Grafičar (loan)	23	(0)
2022–2023	Grafičar	25	(0)
2023–2024	Radnički Niš	33	(1)
2024–2026	Sharjah	30	(1)
2026–	Al-Nasr	1	(0)

International career^{‡}
2023–	Serbia U21	3	(0)
- * Club domestic league appearances and goals as of 29 March 2025 ‡ National team caps and goals as of 00:22, 24 November 2023 (UTC)

David Petrović (Serbian Cyrillic: Давид Петровић; born 14 March 2003) is a Serbian professional footballer who plays as a left back for Al-Nasr.

== Honours ==
Sharjah

- AFC Champions League Two: 2024–25
