= Aniss Karimi =

Moroccan association football player

Personal information
- Full name: Aniss Karimi
- Date of birth: 12 April 2000 (age 26)
- Place of birth: Morocco
- Height: 1.88 m (6 ft 2 in)
- Position: Midfielder

Team information
- Current team: Hatta
- Number: 8

Youth career
- –2021: Wydad AC

Senior career*
Years	Team	Apps	(Gls)
2021	Hatta	2	(0)
2021–2023	Ittihad Kalba	0	(0)
2021–2023	→ Hatta (loan)		
2023–	Hatta		
- * Club domestic league appearances and goals

Aniss Karimi (Arabic:أنيس كريمي; born 12 April 2000) is a Moroccan footballer. He currently plays as a midfielder for Hatta.

== Career statistics ==
=== Club ===
As of 4 May 2021.

Club	Season	League			Cup		Continental		Other		Total	
Club	Season	Division	Apps	Goals	Apps	Goals	Apps	Goals	Apps	Goals	Apps	Goals
Hatta	2020–21	UAE Pro League	2	0	0	0	0	0	0	0	2	0
Career total			2	0	0	0	0	0	0	0	2	0
