= Rikelme =

Brazilian footballer

Personal information
- Full name: Rikelme Hernandes Amorim Rocha
- Date of birth: 16 July 2003 (age 23)
- Place of birth: Cuiabá, Brazil
- Height: 1.84 m (6 ft 0 in)
- Position: Left-back

Team information
- Current team: Shabab Al Ahli
- Number: 16

Youth career
- 2018–2023: Cuiabá
- 2019–2020: → Cruzeiro (loan)

Senior career*
Years	Team	Apps	(Gls)
2021–2024	Cuiabá	40	(1)
2022	→ Dom Bosco (loan)	9	(3)
2024–	Shabab Al Ahli	22	(0)
- * Club domestic league appearances and goals as of 19:12, 29 November 2023 (UTC)

Rikelme Hernandes Amorim Rocha (born 16 July 2003), simply known as Rikelme, is a Brazilian professional footballer who plays as a left-back for Shabab Al Ahli.

== Club career ==
Born in Cuiabá, Mato Grosso, Rikelme joined Cuiabá's youth setup in 2018, aged 14. After impressing with the under-15 squad, he signed a professional contract in 2019, and was subsequently loaned to Cruzeiro.

Upon returning in December 2020, Rikelme made his first team debut for Dourado on 6 February 2021, coming on as a late substitute for Elvis in a 1–0 home win over Vila Nova, for the 2020 Copa Verde. In 2021, he only appeared with the main squad in the Campeonato Mato-Grossense and in the Copa FMF, as the club opted to field an under-23 team in the latter tournament.

Rikelme was loaned to Dom Bosco for the 2022 Mato-Grossense, being unable to play in the semifinals against his parent club. Upon returning, he featured in two Copa Sudamericana matches before making his Série A debut on 23 October 2022, replacing André Luis in a 2–1 home loss against Goiás.

Converted into a left back during the 2023 season, Rikelme established himself as a regular starter under head coach António Oliveira and scored his first top tier goal on 2 July of that year, netting his team's third in a 3–0 home win over Santos; he also became the youngest player to score for the club in the Série A.

== International career ==
On 6 April 2023, Rikelme was called up to the Brazil under-20s for friendlies in Spain, becoming the first ever player of Cuiabá to be called up to any category of the national side.

== Personal life ==
Rikelme's older brother Matheus Ernandes is also a footballer. A central defender, he was also groomed at Cuiabá.

== Career statistics ==
As of match played 26 November 2023

Club	Season	League			State league		Cup		Continental		Other		Total	
Club	Season	Division	Apps	Goals	Apps	Goals	Apps	Goals	Apps	Goals	Apps	Goals	Apps	Goals
Cuiabá	2020	Série B	0	0	—		—		—		2 (Note: Appearances in Copa Verde)	0	2	0
Cuiabá	2021	Série A	0	0	7 (Note: Appearances in Campeonato Mato-Grossense)	0	1	0	—		9 (Note: Eight appearances in Copa FMF, one appearance in Copa Verde)	0	17	0
Cuiabá	2022	Série A	1	0	—		—		2 (Note: Appearances in Copa Sudamericana)	0	3 (Note: One appearance in Copa FMF, two appearances in Copa Verde)	0	6	0
Cuiabá	2023	Série A	28	1	4	0	1	0	—		—		33	1
Cuiabá	Total		29	1	11	0	2	0	2	0	14	0	58	1
Dom Bosco (loan)	2022	Mato-Grossense	—		9	3	—		—		—		9	3
Career total			29	1	20	3	2	0	2	0	14	0	67	4
