= Nashid Abdul Qadir =

Emirati footballer (born 1996)

Nashid Abdul Qadir ناشد عبد القادر
Personal information
- Full name: Nashid Abdul Qadir Ali
- Date of birth: 25 August 1996 (age 30)
- Place of birth: Emirates
- Height: 1.86 m (6 ft 1 in)
- Position: Defender

Team information
- Current team: Al-Hamriyah
- Number: 33

Youth career
- Dhofar

Senior career*
Years	Team	Apps	(Gls)
2015–2018	Dhofar		
2018–2021	Dibba		
2021–2023	Al Urooba		
2024–2025	Al Dhafra		
2025	Majd		
2025–	Al-Hamriyah		
- * Club domestic league appearances and goals

Nashid Abdul Qadir (Arabic:ناشد عبد القادر) (born 25 August 1996) is an Emirati footballer who plays for Al-Hamriyah as a defender.

== Career ==
=== Dhofar ===
Nashid Abdul Qadir started his career at Dhofar and is a product of the Dhofar's youth system.

=== Dibba Al-Fujairah ===
On 18 September 2018 left Dhofar and signed with Dibba . On 20 September 2018, Nashid made his professional debut for Dibba Al-Fujairah against Emirates Club in the Pro League . landed again with Dibba Al-Fujairah from the UAE Pro League to the UAE First Division League in 2018-19 season.

=== Al Urooba ===
On 6 June 2021 left Dibba and signed with Al Urooba.
