= Abdullah Al-Junaibi =

Emirati footballer (born 1988)

Personal information
- Full name: Abdullah Saleh Khamis Al Mukhaini Al-Junaibi
- Date of birth: 14 June 1988 (age 38)
- Place of birth: United Arab Emirates
- Height: 1.88 m (6 ft 2 in)
- Position: Defender

Team information
- Current team: Ajman
- Number: 3

Youth career
- 2003–2008: Sharjah

Senior career*
Years	Team	Apps	(Gls)
2008–2009	Sharjah		
2010–2011	Al-Shabab		
2011–2012	Al-Arabi		
2012–2014	Al-Shaab	47	(0)
2014–2019	Al-Wasl	88	(0)
2019–2020	Fujairah	16	(2)
2020–	Ajman	72	(3)
- * Club domestic league appearances and goals as of 10 February 2025

Abdullah Saleh Khamis Al Mukhaini Al-Junaibi (Arabic:عبد الله الجنيبي; born 14 June 1988) is an Emirati footballer who plays for Ajman as a defender .
