= Yaqoub Yousif =

Emirati association football player

Yaqoub Yousif يعقوب يوسف
Personal information
- Full name: Yaqoub Yousif Abdulla Eisa Al Ali
- Date of birth: 12 September 1999 (age 27)
- Place of birth: Emirates
- Height: 1.70 m (5 ft 7 in)
- Position: Forward

Team information
- Current team: Al-Hamriyah
- Number: 99

Youth career
- –2018: Emirates

Senior career*
Years	Team	Apps	(Gls)
2018–2024	Emirates	10	(1)
2023	→ Al Urooba (loan)		
2024–	Al-Hamriyah	0	(0)
- * Club domestic league appearances and goals

Yaqoub Yousif (Arabic:يعقوب يوسف) (born 12 September 1997) is an Emirati footballer. He currently plays for Al-Hamriyah as a forward.

== Career ==
Yaqoub Yousif started his career at Emirates Club and is a product of the Emirates Club's youth system. On 13 December 2018, Yaqoub Yousif made his professional debut for Emirates Club against Al-Sharjah in the Pro League . landed again with Emirates Club from the UAE Pro League to the UAE First Division League in 2018-19 season.
