= Mauro Bertoni =

Italian football manager

Personal information
- Full name: Mauro Tomaso Bertoni
- Date of birth: 27 October 1969 (age 57)
- Place of birth: Bagnolo Mella, Italy
- Height: 1.84 m (6 ft 0 in)
- Position: Left-back

Senior career*
Years	Team	Apps	(Gls)
1992–1993	Alzano Virescit	32	(3)
1993–1996	Lumezzane	75	(9)
1996–1997	Alessandria	32	(1)
1997–1998	Ospitaletto	31	(8)
1998	Rimini	18	(2)
1999	Sassuolo	9	(1)
1999–2002	Montichiari	100	(10)
2003–2005	Cremonese	66	(1)
2005	USO Calcio	10	(0)
2006–2011	Rodengo Saiano	149	(10)
Total		522	(45)

Managerial career
- 2011: Rodengo Saiano (player/assistant)
- 2013–2014: Cremonese U17
- 2014–2015: Cremonese U19
- 2015: Ciserano
- 2016: Amicale
- 2016–2017: Lumezzane (youth scouting coordinator)
- 2017: Lumezzane
- 2017–2019: AC Milan (youth scouting coordinator)
- 2019–2022: Feralpisalò U19
- 2022–2023: Fatih Karagümrük (assistant)
- 2023–2024: Sampdoria (assistant)
- * Club domestic league appearances and goals

Mauro Tomaso Bertoni (born 27 October 1969) is an Italian former professional footballer who played as a left-back.

== Honours ==
Cremonese

- Serie C1: 2004–05

Rodengo Saiano

- Serie D: 2006-07
