= Goran Tufegdžić =

Serbian footballer and coach

Personal information
- Date of birth: 15 November 1971 (age 54)
- Place of birth: Požarevac, SFR Yugoslavia
- Position: Midfielder

Team information
- Current team: Ajman (head coach)

Senior career*
Years	Team	Apps	(Gls)
1987–1989	Mladi Radnik Požarevac		

International career
1989	Yugoslavia U-23		

Managerial career
- 1999–2000: Mladi Radnik Požarevac
- 2000–2001: Zvižd Kučevo
- 2001–2002: FA Serbia Football School
- 2002–2003: Al-Qadsia (assistant)
- 2003–2004: Mladi Radnik Požarevac
- 2005–2007: Al-Qadsia
- 2007–2009: Al-Shabab
- 2008–2009: Kuwait (assistant)
- 2009–2013: Kuwait
- 2013–2014: Al-Ettifaq
- 2015: Al-Wakrah
- 2016–2017: Kalba
- 2017–2018: Baniyas
- 2019–2020: Khor Fakkan
- 2020–2021: Fujairah
- 2021–2023: Ajman
- 2023: Al Nasr
- 2024: Al Wahda
- 2024–: Ajman
- * Club domestic league appearances and goals

Goran Tufegdžić (Serbian Cyrillic: Горан Туфегџић; born 15 November 1971) is a Serbian football coach and former player.

== Career ==
Tufegdžić started his playing career at FK Mladi Radnik in the second division in 1987, and was selected to play for the Yugoslav Olympic side in 1989. He coached FK Mladi Radnik in 1999–2000 and worked at the Serbia FA Football School in 2001–2002, before flying off to Kuwait to work as the head coach for Al-Qadissiya. He returned to Serbia to manage former club FK Mladi Radnik in 2003–2004 and helped the club to promotion, before working as an assistant coach at Al-Qadissiya for two seasons in 2005–2006 and 2006–2007. Helped guide lowly Al-Shabab to top flight in 2007–08 season.

Under Tufegdžić, Kuwait had played 31 matches, winning 13 matches, drawing 14 and losing four matches with a goals record of 53 goals scored and 29 goals against. On 26 October 2013, he was appointed the head coach of Al-Ettifaq, replacing German Theo Bücker. During second half of the season 2015–16, Tufegdžić was appointed the head coach of Al Wakrah Club, Qatar and saved club from relegation. Season 2016–17 he was working as head coach of UAE pro league Kalba SC. Season 2017–18 he guided Baniyas FC, securing first place in UAE First Division league with remarkable winning percentage of 72,73.

== Personal life ==
In August 2012, Goran was seriously injured after he was shot while on vacation in his country, Serbia, after a sharp dispute between him and one of his neighbors, who was 86.

== Managerial statistics ==
Team	Nat	From	To	Record				
Kuwait national football team	(Kuwait)	2009	2013	74	36	22	16	48.65
Al-Ettifaq	(Saudi Arabia)	2013	2014	13	5	4	4	38.46
Al-Wakrah	(Qatar)	2015	2015	11	4	3	4	36.36
Kalba	(United Arab Emirates)	2016	2017	52	17	13	22	32.69
Baniyas	(United Arab Emirates)	2017	2018	22	16	4	2	72.73
Khor Fakkan	(United Arab Emirates)	2019	2020	16	4	5	7	25.00
Fujairah	(United Arab Emirates)	2020	2021	21	5	2	14	23.81
Ajman	(United Arab Emirates)	2021	2023	64	24	13	27	37.50
Al Nasr	(United Arab Emirates)	2023	2023	10	3	2	5	30.00
Al Wahda	(United Arab Emirates)	2024	2024	16	7	4	5	43.75
Total				297	120	72	105	40.40

== Achievements ==
Kuwait

- WAFF Championship: 2010
- Arabian Gulf Cup: 2010

Baniyas

- UAE First Division League: 2018

Records

- 1st place - Kuwait Premier League 2002 /2003
- 3rd place - Al Kharafi Champion Cup 2003 / 2004
- 1st place - Crown Prince Cup 2003 /2004
- 1st place - Kuwait Premier League 2003 / 2004
- 1st place - Al-Ameer Cup 2003 / 2004
- (First time in Kuwait history club win all competition in one season 2003/04)
- 2nd place - 1st Division Serbian League 2004 / 2005
- 3rd place - 1st Division Serbian League 2005 / 2006
- 1st place - Al-Ameer Cup 2006 / 2007
- Semi Finals - Asian Champion League 2006 / 2007
- Finals - Gulf Cup 2006 / 2007
- 1st place - 1st Division Kuwaiti League 2007 / 2008
- Semi Finals-Arabian Golf Cup 19 Oman 2009
- 2nd place - Qualification for AFC in Qatar 2011
- 1st place - 6th West Asian Football Federation Championship 2010.
- 1st place—20th Arabian Gulf Cup - Jemen 2010
- 1st place—tournament in Jordan 2011 (FUCHS)
- 3rd place - Arab Games in Doha 2011

- Kuwait national football team declared as most developed national team in Asia (2010/2011)

- 3rd place - Arab Gulf Cup Bahrain 2013

1st place - UAE First Division league 2017/2018 (awarded as best coach of the league for 2017/2018 season)
