= Saeed Suleiman =

Emirati association football player (born 1999)

Saeed Suleiman سعيد سليمان
Personal information
- Full name: Saeed Suleiman Salem Mobarek
- Date of birth: 18 April 1999 (age 27)
- Place of birth: Emirates
- Height: 1.77 m (5 ft 10 in)
- Position: Defender

Team information
- Current team: Al Bataeh
- Number: 50

Senior career*
Years	Team	Apps	(Gls)
2019–2026	Shabab Al-Ahli	26	(0)
2020–2021	→ Hatta (loan)	20	(1)
2021–2023	→ Ajman (loan)	38	(0)
2026–	Al Bataeh	0	(0)
- * Club domestic league appearances and goals

Saeed Suleiman (born 18 April 1999) is an Emirati professional footballer who plays as a defender for Al Bataeh.
