= Bilal Yousif =

Emirati footballer (born 1995)

Personal information
- Full name: Bilal Yousif Abdullah
- Date of birth: 25 May 1995 (age 31)
- Place of birth: United Arab Emirates
- Height: 1.72 m (5 ft 7 1/2 in)
- Position: Defensive midfielder

Team information
- Current team: Ajman
- Number: 26

Youth career
- Sharjah

Senior career*
Years	Team	Apps	(Gls)
2017–2018	Sharjah	9	(0)
2018–2019	Al Hamriyah	11	(0)
2019–2021	Fujairah	30	(1)
2021–	Ajman	51	(0)

International career
2023–	United Arab Emirates	2	(0)
- * Club domestic league appearances and goals

Bilal Yousif (Arabic:بلال يوسف) (born 25 May 1995) is an Emirati footballer who plays as a defensive midfielder for Ajman.
