= Kauan Santos =

Brazilian footballer

Personal information
- Full name: Kauan Santos Silva
- Date of birth: 17 June 2004 (age 22)
- Place of birth: Planaltina, Brazil
- Height: 1.69 m (5 ft 7 in)
- Positions: Attacking midfielder; full-back

Team information
- Current team: Shabab Al Ahli
- Number: 31

Youth career
- 2015–2024: Palmeiras

Senior career*
Years	Team	Apps	(Gls)
2023–2024	Palmeiras	1	(0)
2024–	Shabab Al Ahli	1	(1)
- * Club domestic league appearances and goals as of 13:57, 1 August 2024 (UTC)

Kauan Santos Silva (born 17 June 2004), known as Kauan Santos or just Kauan, is a Brazilian footballer who plays as an attacking midfielder or full back for Shabab Al Ahli.

== Career ==
Born in Planaltina, Federal District, Kauan joined Palmeiras' youth setup in 2015, aged 11. On 15 September 2022, he renewed his contract with the club until January 2025.

Kauan made his first team – and Série A – debut with Verdão on 1 October 2023, coming on as a late substitute for Breno Lopes in a 2–1 away loss to Red Bull Bragantino.

== Career statistics ==
As of 30 October 2023.

Club	Season	League			State League		Cup		Continental		Other		Total	
Club	Season	Division	Apps	Goals	Apps	Goals	Apps	Goals	Apps	Goals	Apps	Goals	Apps	Goals
Palmeiras	2023	Série A	1	0	—		0	0	0	0	—		1	0
Career total			1	0	0	0	0	0	0	0	0	0	1	0

== Honours ==
Palmeiras

- Copa São Paulo de Futebol Júnior: 2022, 2023
