= Mateusão =

Brazilian footballer

Personal information
- Full name: Mateus Dias Lima
- Date of birth: 23 April 2004 (age 22)
- Place of birth: Três Marias, Brazil
- Height: 1.84 m (6 ft 0 in)
- Position: Forward

Team information
- Current team: Shabab Al Ahli
- Number: 19

Youth career
- América Mineiro
- 2019–2022: Flamengo

Senior career*
Years	Team	Apps	(Gls)
2021–2023	Flamengo	17	(0)
2023–	Shabab Al Ahli	45	(13)

International career
2019	Brazil U16	5	(0)
- * Club domestic league appearances and goals as of 25 February 2026

Mateus Dias Lima (born 23 April 2004), commonly known as Mateusão, is a Brazilian professional footballer who plays as a forward for UAE Pro League club Shabab Al Ahli.

== Career ==
=== Early career ===
Born in Três Marias, Minas Gerais, Mateusão began his career with América Mineiro before being transferred to Flamengo on 29 April 2019.

=== Flamengo ===
On 3 June 2020, he signed his first professional contract with Flamengo until April 2025.

Mateusão made his professional debut for Flamengo on 2 March 2021, coming on as a 76th-minute substitute for Yuri de Oliveira in a 1–0 Campeonato Carioca home win over Nova Iguaçu. On 19 August of the following year, he renewed his contract until 2027.

=== Shabab Al Ahli ===
On 22 July 2023, Flamengo accepted the €2.0m offer from UAE Pro League club Shabab Al Ahli to transfer Mateusão.

== Career statistics ==
As of 16 January 2025.

Club	Season	League			State League		Cup		Continental		Other		Total	
Club	Season	Division	Apps	Goals	Apps	Goals	Apps	Goals	Apps	Goals	Apps	Goals	Apps	Goals
Flamengo	2021	Série A	0	0	2 (Note: Appearance(s) in the Campeonato Carioca)	0	–		–		–		2	0
Flamengo	2022	Série A	8	0	1	0	0	0	0	0	–		9	0
Flamengo	2023	Série A	0	0	6	0	0	0	0	0	1 (Note: Appearance(s) in the Recopa Sudamericana)	0	7	0
Flamengo	Total		8	0	9	0	0	0	0	0	1	0	18	0
Shabab Al Ahli	2023–24	UPL	15	5	–		–		–		3	1	18	6
Shabab Al Ahli	2024–25	UPL	6	0	–		1	0	8	4	4	1	19	5
Career total			29	5	9	0	1	0	8	4	8	2	55	11

== Honours ==
Flamengo

- Copa Libertadores: 2022
- Copa do Brasil: 2022
