= Yuri César =

Footballer (born 2000)

Personal information
- Full name: Yuri César Santos de Oliveira Silva
- Date of birth: 6 May 2000 (age 26)
- Place of birth: Volta Redonda, Brazil
- Height: 1.72 m (5 ft 8 in)
- Position: Winger

Team information
- Current team: Shabab Al Ahli
- Number: 57

Youth career
- 2014–2020: Flamengo

Senior career*
Years	Team	Apps	(Gls)
2019–2021	Flamengo	0	(0)
2020–2021	→ Fortaleza (loan)	28	(1)
2021–	Shabab Al Ahli	109	(23)

International career^{‡}
2026–	United Arab Emirates	2	(0)
- * Club domestic league appearances and goals as of 09 April 2026 ‡ National team caps and goals as of 27 September 2026

Yuri César Santos de Oliveira Silva (born 6 May 2000) is a professional footballer who plays as a winger for Shabab Al Ahli. Born in Brazil, he plays for the United Arab Emirates national team.

== Career ==
=== Flamengo ===
Yuri César made his professional debut with Flamengo in a 0-0 Campeonato Carioca tie with Macaé on 18 January 2020.

==== Fortaleza (loan) ====
On 8 March 2020 Yuri signed with Fortaleza on loan until the end of the 2020 Campeonato Brasileiro Série A.

=== Shabab Al-Ahli ===
On 26 January 2021, Yuri César signed with UAE Pro League club Shabab Al Ahli.

== Career statistics ==
As of 16 January 2025.

Club	Season	League			Cup		Continental		Other		Total	
Club	Season	Division	Apps	Goals	Apps	Goals	Apps	Goals	Apps	Goals	Apps	Goals
Flamengo	2019	Série A	0	0	–		–		0	0	0	0
Flamengo	2020	Série A	0	0	–		–		4 (Note: Appearance(s) in Campeonato Carioca.)	0	4	0
Flamengo	Total		0	0	0	0	0	0	4	0	4	0
Fortaleza (loan)	2020	Série A	28	1	2	0	–		9 (Note: Five appearances and three goals in Campeonato Cearense, four appearances and one goal in Copa do Nordeste.)	4	39	6
Shabab Al Ahli	2020–21	UPL	4	0	–		–		–		4	0
Shabab Al Ahli	2021–22	UPL	17	3	–		1	0	3	0	21	3
Shabab Al Ahli	2022–23	UPL	23	4	2	1	–		–		25	5
Shabab Al Ahli	2023–24	UPL	25	6	3	1	1	0	3	1	32	8
Shabab Al Ahli	2024–25	UPL	11	2	1	0	8	1	6	2	26	5
Shabab Al Ahli	Total		80	15	6	2	10	1	12	3	108	21
Career total			108	16	8	2	10	1	25	7	148	27
