= Shabab Al Ahli Club =

Emirati professional football club

Shabab Al-Ahli نادي شباب الأهلي
- Full name: Shabab Al-Ahli Dubai
- Nickname: "The Red Knights" (Arabic: Fursan Al Humur
- Founded: 1958; 68 years ago, as Al Ahli Club; 2017; 9 years ago as Shabab Al Ahli Club
- Ground: Rashid Stadium
- Capacity: 8,015
- Owner: Hamdan Al Maktoum
- Chairman: Mohammed Ibrahim
- Head coach: André Jardine
- League: UAE Pro League
- 2025–26: UAE Pro League, 2nd of 14
- Website: www.shababalahli.ae
| Home colours | Away colours |

Shabab Al-Ahli Club (Arabic: نادي شباب الأهلي, romanized: nādī šabāb al-ʿahlī, lit. 'National Youth Club') is an Emirati professional football club based in Dubai, that currently plays in the UAE Pro League. It is one of the most successful clubs in the UAE.

Al-Ahli FC has won 9 league titles, 11 UAE President Cup titles, 5 ADIB cup titles, 7 UAE super Cup titles, 1 combined league. 1 Emirati-Moroccan Super Cup,1 Qatar–UAE Super Shield, 1 Qatar–UAE Challenge Shield, for a total of 36 titles, making them the second most successful team in the UAE and the most successful team in Dubai. In the latest ranking by the IFFHS, Shabab Al Ahli was ranked the 7th best club in Asia and 110th in the world.

In 2017, the Dubai CSC and Al Shabab merged within Al Ahli, at which point the club renamed itself to Shabab Al Ahli.

== History ==
=== Establishment ===
Al Ahli Club was established in 1970 when two local football teams Al Wehdah and Al Shabab (est. 1958) joined for a training camp in Egypt but decided to merge as one single club under first club president H.E. Nasser Abdulla Hussain Lootah. Four years later another local team Al Najah joined to form Al Ahli Club.

Al Ahli translates to "domestic or national" in Arabic. The club won three UAE Arabian Gulf League titles in the 1970s and won its fourth in 2006, fifth in 2009, sixth in 2014, seventh in 2016, eighth in 2023, and ninth in 2025

=== 1973–1980: The golden age and aftermath decline ===
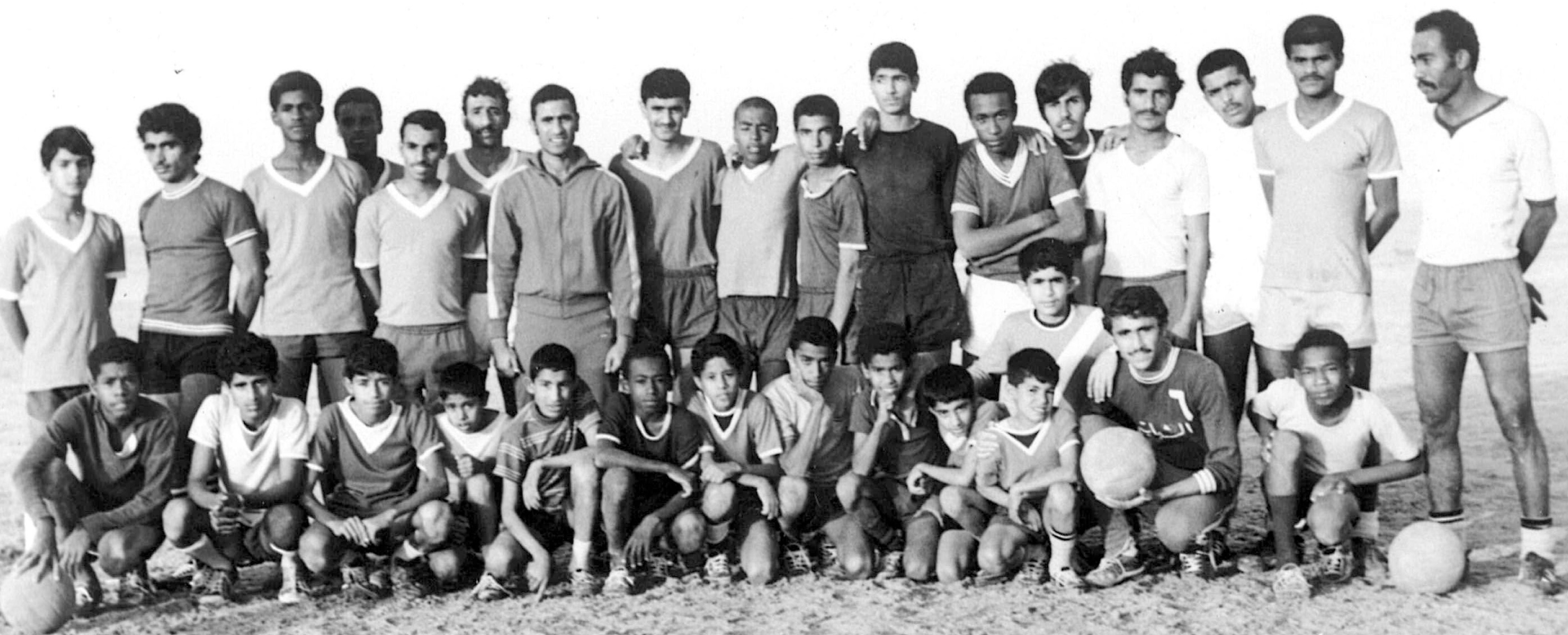
Mohammed Shehta in the middle, the first manager for Al Ahli Club in early 70s.

It took Al Ahli only four years after its establishment to win the UAE Arabian Gulf League twice consecutively in 1974-75 and 1975-76 then again in 1979-80 for the third time, which allowed them to permanently keep the league trophy. The victorious team, led by coach Mohamed Shehta and featuring players such as Hassan Nazari and Hassan Roshan. The team also won three President Cup titles during that period. Drawing hometown fans, Al Ahli has been and continues to be one of the most popular sports teams in the UAE. However, the club went into decline for few decades, the result of which saw the club relegated to the second division (1995–96) in a dramatic way, when Al Ahli played against neighbour rival Al Shabab, Al Ahli needed just one point from the match to stay in the first division. Al Ahli has lost the match and Al Shabab has won the league title. The same year, Al Ahli won the President Cup title. After a period of decline, Al Ahli went back on top under the new leadership of Sheikh Hamdan bin Mohammed bin Rashid Al Maktoum, the Deputy Ruler of Dubai, winning its fourth league title in 2006 and the following years, Al Ahli continued to be a successful club in the UAE by winning 6 President Cups. The early 2000s saw Iranian legend Ali Karimi play multiple seasons for Al Ahli, finishing as league top scorer in 2003-04 and being named Asian footballer of the year 2004.

=== 2009 FIFA Club World Cup ===
Al-Ahli, as 2008–09 UAE Pro-League champions and as Abu Dhabi was hosting the event, qualified for the 2009 FIFA Club World Cup which was held in December 2009. They lost 0–2 to Auckland City in their only game in the competition.

=== Bouncing Back ===
The club began to rise again and in 2010 with Abdullah Al Naboodah, the squad was gradually re-built, with the likes of Fabio Cannavaro and Grafite and Ricardo Quaresma joined the Emirati homegrown talents Ahmed Khalil and Ismael Al Hammadi. In 2012, Al Ahli won the UAE President's Cup and the Arabian Gulf Cup. The arrival of the Romanian football manager Cosmin Olaroiu in 2013, set the stage for a highly successful 2013–14 season. Al Ahli performed strongly in the league and assured its 6th title with a record for the highest ever points total for a league season (62). In addition, the club won the Arabian Gulf Cup, 2 Arabian Gulf Super Cups (2013–14, 2014–15) and in the following year they reached 2015 AFC Champions League Final which they narrowly lost to the Chinese team Guangzhou Evergrande 1–0 on aggregate. Al Ahli homegrown forward Ahmed Khalil named the UAE's sole recipient of the prestigious Asian Footballer of the Year award in 2015. In 2016, they again won their 7th domestic league title with two matches to play.

=== 2017 Merge ===
In 2017 the clubs Dubai CSC and Al Shabab joined with Al-Ahli FC to form Shabab Al Ahli. The merge was seen as a controversial move as it meant combining the success of rival club Al Shabab with Al Ahli and it also meant missing the AFC Champions League for the first three years of its existence since it requires a club to exist for three years to obtain an AFC licence. However, the team would quickly experience success as they would win the League Cup and President's Cup in 2019.

== Crest and nickname ==
2017–Present

The original Al Ahli logo reflected a falcon on top of a football and the words "Al Ahli Club" written horizontally. After rebranding themselves to Red Knights in 2006, the logo changed to a horse head shape with the letters "AC" (Al Ahli Club) on top. The new logo represents strength and high spirits also it goes along with the new nickname Red Knights instead of the old nickname the Red Devils.

== Grounds ==
Rashid Stadium is a multi-purpose stadium in Dubai, United Arab Emirates that was named after Sheikh Rashid bin Saeed Al Maktoum. It is currently used mostly for football & Rugby matches. The stadium holds 12,000 people. It was built in 1948. It is the home ground of Shabab Al-Ahli. Shabab Al Ahli also has Maktoum bin Rashid Al Maktoum Stadium and Al Aweer Stadium as a second and third home ground for the club after merging with Al Shabab and Dubai in 2017.

== Rivalries ==
Shabab Al Ahli rivalry with Al Ain is gaining popularity as the two clubs alternated as champions in the 70s and more after 2010, and currently, both teams are considered among the top teams in the UAE. The match usually creates a lively atmosphere. Al Nasr and Al Wasl are also neighbouring rivals competing for who is the best team in Dubai.

=== Old Dubai Derby ===
The old Dubai derby is contested between Al Ahli and Al Nasr. It has its roots from the early 1970's before the formation of the league. The two were the best teams in Dubai and games between the two teams would attract fans from all over the UAE, and even spectators from as far as Kuwait and Jordan.

== Active departments ==
The club is also known as Al Ahli Castle because of its involvement in other professional sports. The club competes in basketball, volleyball, handball, track sport, table tennis and track cycling. Al Ahli is also known for its involvement in cultural activities and community services. Al Ahli Drama club established in 1981, to promote Emirati arts and theatrical plays focusing on UAE tradition, heritage and current events. The club's beach soccer team were UAE champions in 2021.

== Relationship with La Liga ==
In 2016, Al Ahli became the first foreign club to sign a partnership agreement with La Liga, the first of its kind. The signing of the agreement, staged at La Liga's headquarters in Madrid, marks the beginning of a linkup in which La Liga's experience will be used to support Dubai's leading club in its development, especially via a training program from youth coaches in Spain will be applied. The club's junior sides will gain invitations to leading tournaments there, providing the opportunity to gain valuable experience playing top-class opposition.

== Record ==
| Season | Lvl. | Tms. | Pos. | President's Cup | League Cup |
|---|---|---|---|---|---|
| 2017–18 | 1 | 12 | 5th | Semi-final | Semi-final |
| 2018–19 | 1 | 14 | 2nd | Champions | Champions |
| 2019–20^{a} | 1 | 14 | 1st | Quarter-finals | Runner-up |
| 2020–21 | 1 | 14 | 3rd | Champions | Champions |
| 2021–22 | 1 | 14 | 5th | Quarter-final | Runner-up |
| 2022–23 | 1 | 14 | 1st | Quarter-final | Quarter-final |
| 2023–24 | 1 | 14 | 2nd | Semi-final | Quarter-final |
| 2024–25 | 1 | 14 | 1st | Champions | Runner-up |

_{Notes 2019–20 UAE football season was cancelled due to the COVID-19 pandemic in the United Arab Emirates.}

Key

- Pos. = Position
- Tms. = Number of teams
- Lvl. = League

== Club officials ==
| Position | Staff |
|---|---|
| Head Coach | (Portugal) Paulo Sousa |
| Assistant Coach | (Portugal) Manuel Pereira (Spain) Víctor Sánchez Lladò |
| Goalkeeper Coach | (Brazil) Leandro Yoshinaga Suzuki |
| Fitness Trainer | (Spain) Manuel Rivero (Spain) Lluis Sala Pere |
| Doctor | (Croatia) Krešimir Kos |
| Physiotherapist | (Iran) Maharazad Kaneani (Romania) Vasile Clofu (Egypt) Mohamed Salah El Din |
| Masseur | (Croatia) Tomislav Cerovecki |
| Interpreter | (Egypt) Kareem Mohammed Shalabi |
| Manager | (United Arab Emirates) Khaled Al-Kaabi (United Arab Emirates) Ahmed Alishah |

== Players ==
=== Current squad ===
As of UAE Pro-League:

Note: Flags indicate national team as defined under FIFA eligibility rules; some limited exceptions apply. Players may hold more than one non-FIFA nationality.

| No. | Pos. | Nation | Player |
|---|---|---|---|
| 1 | GK | UAE | Rakan Al-Menhali |
| 3 | DF | BRA | Igor Gomes |
| 5 | MF | ARG | Elián Irala |
| 6 | MF | IRI | Saeid Ezatolahi |
| 8 | MF | UAE | Mohammed Juma |
| 9 | FW | IRI | Reza Ghandipour |
| 10 | MF | ARG | Federico Cartabia |
| 11 | MF | UAE | Yahya Al-Ghassani |
| 12 | GK | UAE | Hassan Hamza |
| 13 | DF | BRA | Renan |
| 14 | MF | URU | Damián García |
| 15 | DF | BRA | Kaiky |
| 16 | DF | BRA | Rikelme |
| 17 | GK | UAE | Khaled Al-Senani |
| 19 | FW | BRA | Mateusão |
| 20 | FW | IRI | Sardar Azmoun |
| 21 | FW | UAE | Sultan Adil |
| 22 | GK | UAE | Hamad Al-Meqbaali |

| No. | Pos. | Nation | Player |
|---|---|---|---|
| 23 | DF | IRI | Mersad Seifi |
| 24 | MF | NED | Jahnoah Markelo |
| 26 | MF | UAE | Eid Khamis |
| 30 | MF | MLI | Oumar Keita |
| 31 | DF | BRA | Kauan Santos |
| 32 | DF | UAE | Hamad Al-Qayoudhi |
| 33 | GK | BRA | Matheus Donelli (on loan from Corinthians) |
| 37 | DF | UAE | Ahmed Jamil |
| 44 | DF | POR | Jorge Fernandes |
| 57 | MF | UAE | Yuri César |
| 61 | DF | UAE | Bader Nasser |
| 70 | MF | ITA | Thiago Scarpino |
| 75 | DF | BRA | Mateus Henrique |
| 77 | FW | UAE | Guilherme Bala |
| 79 | FW | BRA | João Marcelo (on loan from Atlético Mineiro) |
| 80 | MF | BRA | Breno |
| 88 | MF | SRB | Nemanja Maksimović |

=== Out on loan ===
Note: Flags indicate national team as defined under FIFA eligibility rules; some limited exceptions apply. Players may hold more than one non-FIFA nationality.

| No. | Pos. | Nation | Player |
|---|---|---|---|
| 50 | DF | UAE | Saeed Suleiman (on loan to Hatta) |
| 55 | GK | UAE | Rashed Maqdami (on loan to United) |

| No. | Pos. | Nation | Player |
|---|---|---|---|
| 60 | MF | MLI | Drissa Coulibaly (on loan to Hatta) |
| 99 | FW | BRA | Adyson (on loan to Kalba) |

Players with Multiple Nationalities

- (United Arab Emirates) (Argentina) Federico Cartabia
- (United Arab Emirates) (Brazil) Guilherme Bala
- (United Arab Emirates) (Brazil) Kauan Santos
- (United Arab Emirates) (Brazil) Mateusão
- (United Arab Emirates) (Brazil) Renan
- (United Arab Emirates) (Brazil) Yuri César
- (United Arab Emirates) (Oman) Khaled Al Senani

== Former Squads ==
=== FIFA Club World Cup ===
- 2009 FIFA Club World Cup squad

== Shabab Al Ahli from Board Of Directors ==
- Sheikh Hamdan Bin Mohammed Al Maktoum – President
- Sheikh Maktoum Bin Mohammed Al Maktoum – Vice President
- Sheikh Ahmed Bin Mohammed Al Maktoum – Chairman
- Sheikh Mansour Bin Mohammed Al Maktoum – Deputy Chairman

=== Board members ===
- Khalifa Sulaiman
- Sami Al-Qamzi
- Mohammed Al Gergawi
- Essam Al Humaidan
- Mohammed Ahmed Al-Marri
- Hisham Abdullah Al Qassem
- Abdullah Mohammed Al Basti
- Ahmed Mohammed bin Humaidan

=== Shabab Al Ahli Football Company Board Directors ===
- Sheikh Mansour Bin Mohammed Al Maktoum - Chairman
- Sami Al Qamzi - Deputy Chairman

=== Board Members ===
- Abdul Majeed Hussain
- Ibrahim Abdul-Malik
- Khalid Buhumaid
- Jamal Al Mehairi
- Ali Al-Habsi
- Saeed Rashid

== Honours ==
=== Domestic ===
- UAE Pro League: 9
  - Champions: 1974–75, 1975–76, 1979–80, 2005–06, 2008–09, 2013–14, 2015–16, 2022–23, 2024–25
- UAE President's Cup: 11 (record)
  - Champions: 1974–75, 1976–77, 1987–88, 1995–96, 2001–02, 2003–04, 2007–08, 2012–13, 2018–19, 2020–21, 2024–25
- UAE League Cup: 5 (record)
  - Champions: 2011–12, 2013–14, 2016–17, 2018–19, 2020–21
- UAE Super Cup: 7 (record)
  - Champions: 2009, 2013, 2014, 2016, 2020, 2023, 2024
- Joint League :1
  - Champions: 1974–75

=== Regional ===
- Qatar–UAE Super Shield: 1
  - Champions: 2023–24
- Qatar–UAE Challenge Shield: 1
  - Champions: 2024–25
- Emirati-Moroccan Super Cup: 1
  - Champions: 2016

=== Continental ===
- AFC Champions League
  - Runners-up (1): 2015

Only titles obtained in Al-Ahli and forward are counted. For the predecessor clubs, see Al Shabab SC and Dubai CSC.

== See also ==
- List of football clubs in the United Arab Emirates
- Shabab Al Ahli Club (basketball)
