= Ajman Club =

Emirati professional football club

- Full name: Ajman Sports Club
- Nickname: The Volcano (البركان) The Orange (البرتقالي)
- Founded: 5 November 1974; 51 years ago
- Ground: Ajman Stadium, Ajman
- Capacity: 5,141
- Chairman: Humaid bin Rashid
- Coach: Goran Tufegdžić
- League: UAE Pro League
- 2025–26: UAE Pro League, 7th
- Website: www.ajmansports.ae
Home colours	Away colours	Third colours

Ajman Sports Club (Arabic: نادي عجمان), commonly known as Ajman Club, is an Emirati professional football club based in Ajman. In 2015, Ajman was relegated to the second division, but managed to climb back to the top flight in 2017.

== History ==
The club was established in 1974 after a merger of three clubs, Al Shoala, Al Hilal and Al Nasr shortly after their participation in the 1973–74 season.

== Kit & sponsors ==
The traditional color of Ajman Club home kit is orange. Currently the kits are manufactured by Adidas. From 2018 to 2021 the kit manufacturer was Hummel and before that Uhlsport.

Ajman Bank is a shirt sponsor of Ajman Club.

== Honours ==
The club has gained the following honours:

- Etisalat Emirates Cup: 1

- Winners: 2013
- Runner-up: 2010

- UAE President Cup: 1

*Winners: 1983/1984

- UAE Division One: 2

*Winners: 2010-11, 2016–17

- UAE Vice Presidents Cup 1

*Winners: 2010–11

== Players ==
As of UAE Pro-League:

Note: Flags indicate national team as defined under FIFA eligibility rules; some limited exceptions apply. Players may hold more than one non-FIFA nationality.

No.	Pos.	Nation	Player
2	DF	UAE	Abdelrahman Rakan
3	DF	UAE	Abdullah Al-Junaibi
4	DF	UAE	Salem Suliman
5	DF	MKD	Gjoko Zajkov
6	MF	BRA	Vitão
7	FW	BRA	Lourency
8	MF	BRA	Jobson
9	FW	MAR	Walid Azaro
10	MF	UAE	Mohammed Jumaa
11	MF	UAE	Abdulla Abdelaziz
12	DF	UAE	Mohammad Nasser
14	DF	TUN	Fradj Ben Njima
16	DF	SRB	Aleksandar Vasiljević
17	MF	UAE	Sékou Gassama (on loan from Al Ain)
18	MF	UAE	Ismail Moumen
22	DF	BRA	Vitor Vargas

No.	Pos.	Nation	Player
23	DF	UAE	Ahmed Sulaiman
25	GK	SEN	Alioune Ndao
26	MF	UAE	Bilal Yousif
29	MF	BRA	Carlinhos
30	GK	UAE	Yousef Ahmed Safar
31	MF	MAR	Yassine Jabri
32	DF	ENG	Jay Baisley
33	FW	UAE	Lithierry Silva
40	GK	UAE	Abdullah Al-Tamimi
44	DF	UAE	Yuri Matias
48	FW	MAR	Saad Hadani
50	DF	UAE	Saad Suliman
67	MF	UAE	Anas Mittache
81	GK	UAE	Ali Al-Hosani
90	MF	UAE	Obaid Al-Zaabi
99	FW	UAE	Victor Henrique

Players with Multiple Nationalities

- (United Arab Emirates) (Brazil) Lithierry Silva
- (United Arab Emirates) (Brazil) Victor Henrique
- (United Arab Emirates) (Brazil) Yuri Matias
- (United Arab Emirates) (Mali) Sékou Gassama
- (United Arab Emirates) (Morocco) Anas Mittache
- (United Arab Emirates) (Morocco) Ismail Moumen

== Coaching staff ==
Position	Name
Head coach	(Serbia) Goran Tufegdžić
Assistant coach	(Croatia) Zoran Levnaić
Goalkeeper coach	(United Arab Emirates) Humaid Rakan
Fitness coach	(United Arab Emirates) Salem Ahmed Safar
Match analyst	(United Arab Emirates) Mohammed Al-Junaibi
Doctor	(United Arab Emirates) Abdelaziz Saeed
Physiotherapist	(United Arab Emirates) Ibarhim Al-Yamahi
Technical Director	(France) Faical Gormi

== Managerial history ==
^{*} Served as caretaker coach.

Name	Nat.	From	To	Ref.
Abdul Wahab Abdul Qader	(Iraq)	2005	2006	
Abdul Wahab Abdul Qader	(Iraq)	2008	2010	
Zé Mario	(Brazil)	2009	2009	
Ghazi Ghrairi	(Tunisia)	26 October 2009	12 April 2010	
Abdul Wahab Abdul Qader	(Iraq)	1 September 2011	27 May 2014	
Fathi Al-Jabal	(Tunisia)	6 July 2014	2014	
Salim El-tigani	(Sudan)	1 September 2011	27 May 2014	
Manuel Cajuda	(Portugal)	25 January 2015	30 September 2015	
Ayman Elramady	(Egypt)	1 July 2016	15 May 2021	
Goran Tufegdžić	(Serbia)	28 May 2021	31 May 2023	
Caio Zanardi	(Brazil)	1 June 2023	2023	
Daniel Isăilă	(Romania)	2023	2024	

== Pro-League record ==
Season	Lvl.	Tms.	Pos.	President's Cup	League Cup
2008–09	1	12	9th	Preliminary Round	First Round
2009–10	1	12	12th	Quarter-Finals	Runner-ups
2010–11	2	8	1st	Round of 16	—
2011–12	1	12	7th	Quarter-Finals	First Round
2012–13	1	14	10th	Round of 16	Champions
2013–14	1	14	10th	Round of 16	First Round
2014–15	1	14	13th	Round of 16	First Round
2015–16	2	9	3rd	Round of 16	—
2016–17	2	12	1st	Preliminary Round	—
2017–18	1	12	8th	Round of 16	First Round
2018–19	1	14	7th	Round of 16	First Round
2019–20^{a}	1	14	10th	Round of 16	First Round
2020–21	1	14	12th	Quarter-Finals	First Round
2021–22	1	14	7th	Round of 16	Quarter-Finals
2022–23	1	14	6th	Semi-Finals	First Round
2023–24	1	14	9th	Quarter-Finals	First Round

_{Notes 2019–20 UAE football season was cancelled due to the COVID-19 pandemic in the United Arab Emirates.}

Key

- Pos. = Position
- Tms. = Number of teams
- Lvl. = League

== See also ==
- List of football clubs in the United Arab Emirates
