= 2011–12 UAE Pro League =

UAE Pro League
- Season: 2011–12
- Champions: Al Ain; 10th title
- Relegated: Emirates; Sharjah
- Champions League: Al Ain; Al Jazira; Al Nasr; Al Shabab
- Matches: 132
- Goals: 449 (3.4 per match)
- Top goalscorer: (Ghana) Asamoah Gyan (22)
- Biggest home win: Al Jazira 5–0 Sharjah
- Biggest away win: Emirates 1–5 Al Shabab; Al Wasl 2–6 Al Ahli; Al Jazira 1–5 Al Nasr
- Highest scoring: Sharjah 4–5 Al Nasr (9 goals)
- Highest attendance: 21,455; Al Jazira 1–3 Al Ain

The 2011–12 UAE Pro League season (known as Etisalat Pro League for sponsorship reasons) was the 37th top-level football season in the UAE, and the fourth Professional season.

Al Jazira were the defending champions, having won their 1st Pro League title in the 2010–11 campaign after being runner-up for three times in a row. Al Dhafra and Ittihad Kalba were relegated from the previous season. Ajman Club and Emirates Club were promoted from the UAE Division 1 Group A. The campaign began on 15 October 2011 and ended on 27 May 2012.

== Teams ==
Ittihad Kalba and Al Dhafra were relegated to the 2011–12 UAE Division 1 Group A after finishing in the bottom two spots of the table at the end of the 2010–11 season. The two relegated teams were replaced by 2nd level champions Ajman Club and runners up Emirates Club.

=== Stadia and locations ===
Locations of teams in the 2011–12 UAE Pro-League

Team	Home city	Stadium	Capacity
Ajman	Ajman	Ajman Stadium	10,000
Al Ahli	Dubai	Rashid Stadium	18,000
Al Ain	Al Ain	Tahnoun bin Mohammed Stadium	15,000
Al Jazira	Abu Dhabi	Mohammed bin Zayed Stadium	42,056
Al Nasr	Dubai	Al Maktoum Stadium	12,000
Al Shabab	Dubai	Maktoum bin Rashid Al Maktoum Stadium	12,000
Al Wahda	Abu Dhabi	Al Nahyan Stadium	12,000
Al Wasl	Dubai	Zabeel Stadium	12,000
Baniyas	Abu Dhabi	Baniyas Stadium	9,570
Dubai	Dubai	Police Officers' Club Stadium	6,500
Emirates	Ras al-Khaimah	Emirates Club Stadium	5,000
Sharjah	Sharjah	Sharjah Cricket Stadium	18,000

=== Personnel ===
Note: Flags indicate national team as has been defined under FIFA eligibility rules. Players and Managers may hold more than one non-FIFA nationality.

Team	Chairman	Head coach	Captain
Ajman	(United Arab Emirates) Humaid bin Rashid Al Nuaimi III	(Iraq) Abdul Wahab Abdul Qader	(United Arab Emirates) Mohamed Zahran
Al Ahli	(United Arab Emirates) Hamdan bin Mohammed Al Maktoum	(Spain) Quique Sánchez Flores	(United Arab Emirates) Mohammed Qassim
Al Ain	(United Arab Emirates) Mohamed bin Zayed Al Nahyan	(Romania) Cosmin Olăroiu	(United Arab Emirates) Rami Yaslam
Al Jazira	(United Arab Emirates) Mansour bin Zayed Al Nahyan	(Brazil) Caio Júnior	(Australia) Lucas Neill
Al Nasr	(United Arab Emirates) Sheikh Hamdan bin Rashid	(Italy) Walter Zenga	(United Arab Emirates) Abdallah Mousa
Al Shabab	(United Arab Emirates) Saeed bin Maktoum bin Rashid Al Maktoum	(Brazil) Paulo Bonamigo	(United Arab Emirates) Hassan Al Sharif
Al Wahda	(United Arab Emirates) Saeed bin Zayed Al Nahyan	(Austria) Josef Hickersberger	(United Arab Emirates) Fahed Masoud
Al Wasl	(United Arab Emirates) Ahmed bin Rashid Al Maktoum	(Argentina) Diego Maradona	(United Arab Emirates) Khalid Darwish
Baniyas	(United Arab Emirates) Saif bin Zayed Al Nahyan	(Argentina) Gabriel Calderón	(Oman) Fawzi Bashir
Dubai	(United Arab Emirates) Ahmed bin Mohammed Al Maktoum	(Egypt) Ayman El Ramady	(United Arab Emirates) Jamal Abdullah
Emirates	(United Arab Emirates) Ahmed bin Saqr al-Qassimi	(Tunisia) Ghazi Ghrairi	(Algeria) Karim Kerkar
Sharjah	(Qatar) (United Arab Emirates) Abdullah bin Mohammed Al Thani	(United Arab Emirates) Abdulmajeed Al Nimr	(United Arab Emirates) Nawaf Mubarak

=== Managerial changes ===
Managerial changes during the 2011–12 campaign.

==== Pre-season ====
Team	Outgoing manager	Manner of departure	Replaced by
Al Wasl	(United Arab Emirates) Khalifa Mubarak	Caretaker role ended	(Argentina) Diego Maradona
Al Jazira	(Brazil) Abel Braga	Contract finished	(Belgium) Franky Vercauteren
Al Ain	(Brazil) Alexandre Gallo	Contract finished	(Romania) Cosmin Olăroiu
Baniyas	(United Arab Emirates) Mahdi Ali	Caretaker role ended	(Brazil) Jorvan Vieira
Al Ahli	(United Arab Emirates) Abdulhameed Al Mishtiki	Caretaker role ended	(Czech Republic) Ivan Hašek
Sharjah	(Portugal) Carlos Azenha	Resigned before season started	(Romania) Valeriu Tiţa

==== During the season ====
Team	Outgoing manager	Manner of departure	Replaced by
Dubai	(Argentina) Néstor Clausen	Resigned	(Switzerland) Umberto Barberis
Dubai	(Switzerland) Umberto Barberis	Caretaker role ended	(Romania) Ion Marin
Baniyas	(Brazil) Jorvan Vieira	Sacked	(United Arab Emirates) Salem Al-Orfi
Al Ahli	(Czech Republic) Ivan Hašek	Sacked	(Spain) Quique Sánchez Flores
Baniyas	(United Arab Emirates) Salem Al-Orfi	Sacked	(Argentina) Gabriel Calderón
Dubai	(Romania) Ion Marin	Sacked	(Switzerland) Pierre-André Schürmann
Dubai	(Switzerland) Pierre-André Schürmann	Caretaker role ended	(Egypt) Ayman El Ramady
Sharjah	(Romania) Valeriu Tiţa	Sacked	(Brazil) Jorvan Vieira
Sharjah	(Brazil) Jorvan Vieira	Sacked	(Romania) Valeriu Tiţa
Al Jazira	(Belgium) Franky Vercauteren	Sacked	(Brazil) Caio Júnior
Sharjah	(Romania) Valeriu Tiţa	Sacked	(United Arab Emirates) Abdulmajeed Al Nimr

=== Foreign players ===
The number of foreign players is restricted to four per AGL team.

Club	Player 1	Player 2	Player 3	AFC player	Former players
Ajman	(Algeria) Karim Kerkar	(Ivory Coast) Boris Kabi	(Ivory Coast) Olivier Tia	(Lebanon) Hassan Maatouk	(Senegal) Ibrahima Touré
Al-Ahli	(Brazil) Grafite	(Cameroon) Achille Emaná	(Chile) Luis Jiménez	(Lebanon) Youssef Mohamad	(Brazil) Jajá
Al-Ain	(Argentina) Ignacio Scocco	(Ghana) Asamoah Gyan	(Romania) Mirel Rădoi	(Saudi Arabia) Yasser Al-Qahtani	
Al-Jazira	(Argentina) Matías Delgado	(Brazil) Baré	(Brazil) Ricardo Oliveira	(Australia) Lucas Neill	
Al-Nasr	(Brazil) Léo Lima	(Italy) Luca Toni	(Ivory Coast) Amara Diané	(Australia) Mark Bresciano	(Brazil) Careca (Guinea) Ismaël Bangoura
Al-Shabab	(Brazil) Ciel	(Brazil) Kieza	(Chile) Carlos Villanueva	(Uzbekistan) Azizbek Haydarov	(Brazil) Júlio César
Sharjah	(Brazil) Edinho	(Brazil) Marcelinho	(South Korea) Lee Sang-ho	(Uzbekistan) Timur Kapadze	(Brazil) Vandinho (Iran) Iman Mobali (Serbia) Igor Đurić
Al-Wahda	(Brazil) Fernando Baiano	(Brazil) Hugo	(Brazil) Magrão	(Oman) Mohammed Al-Balushi	
Al-Wasl	(Argentina) Mariano Donda	(Argentina) Juan Mercier	(Uruguay) Juan Manuel Olivera	(Iran) Mohammad Reza Khalatbari	(Chile) Edson Puch (Uruguay) Richard Porta ^{1}
Baniyas	(Algeria) Ismaël Bouzid	(Senegal) André Senghor	(Spain) Francisco Yeste	(Oman) Fawzi Bashir	(France) David Trezeguet (Ivory Coast) Antonin Koutouan
Dubai	(France) Nicolas Marin	(Guinea) Aboubacar Camara	(Guinea) Simon Feindouno	(Lebanon) Abbas Ahmad Atwi	(Bahrain) Faouzi Aaish (Uzbekistan) Ulugbek Bakayev
Emirates	(Ivory Coast) Modibo Kane Diarra	(Morocco) Mohsine Moutouali	(Uzbekistan) Alexander Geynrikh	(Uzbekistan) Jasur Hasanov	(Guinea) Alhassane Keita (Iran) Pejman Nouri (Nigeria) Orok Akarandut

- ^1 Richard Porta has Australian citizenship and was counted as an Asian player.

== League table ==
Pos	Team	Pld	W	D	L	GF	GA	GD	Pts	Qualification or relegation
1	Al Ain (C)	22	17	4	1	52	16	+36	55	2013 AFC Champions League Group stage
2	Al Nasr	22	11	8	3	49	33	+16	41	2013 AFC Champions League Qualifying play-off
3	Al Shabab	22	10	8	4	39	27	+12	38	2013 AFC Champions League Qualifying play-off
4	Al Jazira	22	11	2	9	47	38	+9	35	2013 AFC Champions League Group stage (Note: Al Jazira secured qualification for the 2013 AFC Champions League through winning the 2011–12 UAE President's Cup)
5	Al Ahli	22	10	4	8	45	42	+3	34	
6	Al Wahda	22	8	9	5	32	30	+2	33	
7	Ajman	22	9	4	9	36	35	+1	31	
8	Al Wasl	22	7	5	10	32	40	−8	26	
9	Baniyas	22	6	6	10	34	39	−5	24	2012–13 GCC Champions League
10	Dubai	22	5	5	12	29	40	−11	20	
11	Emirates (R)	22	5	2	15	28	56	−28	17	Promotion/relegation Stage
12	Sharjah (R)	22	2	5	15	26	53	−27	11	Promotion/relegation Stage

Updated to match(es) played on 27 May 2012. Source: Standings
Rules for classification: 1) points; 2) goal difference; 3) number of goals scored.
(C) Champions; (R) Relegated

== Results ==
Home \ Away	AJM	ALI	AIN	JAZ	NAS	SHA	WAH	WAS	YAS	DUB	EMI	SHR
Ajman		0–1	1–4	3–4	1–2	0–1	3–1	1–1	1–1	3–0	1–0	2–1
Al Ahli	2–0		0–2	2–1	3–3	2–3	2–2	1–2	6–4	5–2	2–0	2–2
Al Ain	4–0	1–0		2–0	2–0	3–1	1–0	2–0	3–0	2–1	4–0	2–1
Al Jazira	1–0	4–0	1–3		1–5	2–0	4–2	1–0	3–1	0–2	4–1	5–0
Al Nasr	1–1	4–0	2–0	2–2		2–1	0–1	1–1	2–1	0–1	5–3	3–2
Al Shabab	4–4	2–0	1–1	3–2	2–2		2–1	2–0	1–1	1–1	1–0	5–1
Al Wahda	1–0	3–3	2–2	3–2	1–1	0–0		2–1	2–1	1–1	2–2	1–0
Al Wasl	2–4	2–6	2–2	0–1	2–2	2–2	0–2		1–0	1–2	4–1	3–0
Baniyas	1–2	1–3	2–2	2–1	2–2	0–1	2–2	1–2		2–0	4–1	2–2
Dubai	1–3	1–2	0–2	2–4	1–2	1–1	0–0	5–2	1–2		2–4	3–0
Emirates	1–3	2–1	1–4	3–2	1–3	1–5	2–1	1–2	0–2	2–1		1–2
Sharjah	1–3	1–2	1–4	2–2	4–5	1–0	1–2	1–2	1–2	1–1	1–1	

Updated to match(es) played on 11 May 2012. Source: UFL
Legend: Blue = home team win; Yellow = draw; Red = away team win.

== Goalscorers ==
22 goals

- (Ghana) Asamoah Gyan (Al Ain)

16 goals

- (Brazil) Grafite (Al Ahli)
- (Senegal) André Senghor (Baniyas)

14 goals

- (Brazil) Ricardo Oliveira (Al Jazira)

13 goals

- (Chile) Luis Jiménez (Al Ahli)
- (Uruguay) Juan Manuel Olivera (Al Wasl)

11 goals

- (Brazil) Ciel (Al Shabab)

10 goals

- (Australia) Mark Bresciano (Al Nasr)
- (Brazil) Baré (Al Jazira)
- (Brazil) Edinho (Sharjah)
- (Brazil) Marcelinho (Sharjah)
- (Ivory Coast) Modibo Kane Diarra (Emirates)

Source: official site:

== See also ==
- List of United Arab Emirates football transfers summer 2011
- 2011–12 UAE President's Cup
- 2011–12 Etisalat Emirates Cup
