= 2012–13 UAE President's Cup =

Tournament details
- Country: United Arab Emirates
- Teams: 28

Final positions
- Champions: Al Ahli
- Runners-up: Al Shabab

Tournament statistics
- Matches played: 21
- Goals scored: 78 (3.71 per match)

The 2012–13 UAE President's Cup is the 37th season of the UAE President's Cup, the premier knockout tournament for association football clubs in the United Arab Emirates. The reigning champions are Al Jazira, having won their second title last season. The winners will qualify for the group stage of the 2014 AFC Champions League.

After a change to the format last season garnered criticism for not including as many lower-league teams, the format has now returned to a previous format. 14 teams from UAE Division 1 Group A and Group B took place in a group stage with 2 groups of four and 2 groups of three, with the group winners advancing to a play-off stage. The two winners of the play-off matches will join the 14 Pro-League teams in the round of 16.

== First round ==
=== Group A ===
Pos	Team	Pld	W	D	L	GF	GA	GD	Pts
1	Al Fujairah	3	2	0	1	9	7	+2	6 (Note: Al Urooba 1-4 Al Fujairah)
2	Al Urooba	3	2	0	1	8	5	+3	6
3	Al-Arabi	3	1	0	2	6	8	−2	3
4	Al Jazira Al Hamra	3	1	0	2	5	8	−3	3

Source: Soccerway
Notes:
27 September 2012

Al-Arabi	1–3	Al Jazira Al Hamra

27 September 2012

Al Urooba	1–4	Al Fujairah

5 October 2012

Al Jazira Al Hamra	0–3	Al Urooba

5 October 2012

Al Fujairah	1–4	Al-Arabi

13 October 2012

Al Jazira Al Hamra	2–4	Al Fujairah

13 October 2012

Al Urooba	4–1	Al-Arabi

=== Group B ===
Pos	Team	Pld	W	D	L	GF	GA	GD	Pts
1	Al-Thaid	2	1	1	0	2	1	+1	4
2	Masfut	2	0	2	0	3	3	0	2
3	Al Khaleej	2	0	1	1	2	3	−1	1

Source: Soccerway
27 September 2012

Al Khaleej	0–1	Al-Thaid

5 October 2012

Al-Thaid	1–1	Masfut

13 October 2012

Masfut	2–2	Al Khaleej

=== Group C ===
Pos	Team	Pld	W	D	L	GF	GA	GD	Pts
1	Emirates	2	1	1	0	10	3	+7	4
2	Masafi	2	0	2	0	5	5	0	2
3	Al-Taawon	2	0	1	1	2	9	−7	1

Source: Soccerway
28 September 2012

Emirates	7–0	Al-Taawon

6 October 2012

Al-Taawon	2–2	Masafi

13 October 2012

Masafi	3–3	Emirates

=== Group D ===
Pos	Team	Pld	W	D	L	GF	GA	GD	Pts
1	Al Sharjah	3	2	1	0	8	3	+5	7
2	Dibba Al-Hisn	3	2	0	1	7	5	+2	6
3	Hatta	3	0	2	1	3	5	−2	2
4	Al Ramms	3	0	1	2	3	8	−5	1

Source: Soccerway
28 September 2012

Dibba Al-Hisn	3–1	Hatta

28 September 2012

Al Ramms	1–4	Al Sharjah

6 October 2012

Al Sharjah	3–1	Dibba Al-Hisn

6 October 2012

Hatta	1–1	Al Ramms

13 October 2012

Dibba Al-Hisn	3–1	Al Ramms

13 October 2012

Al Sharjah	1–1	Hatta

== Second round ==
The four group winners from the first round entered at this stage.

19 October 2012

Al-Thaid	1 – 3	Al Sharjah

Emirates Club Stadium, Ras al-Khaimah
19 October 2012

Al Fujairah	2 – 0	Emirates

Sharjah Stadium, Sharjah

The winners of each match advanced to the round of 16.

== Third round ==
The two winning teams from the second round join the 14 Pro-League teams in this round. The games took place on 19, 20 and 21 December 2012.

19 December 2012

Al Shaab Sharjah	1 – 4	Al Wahda

19 December 2012

Al Dhafra	1 – 1 3 - 4 pens	Al Ahli

20 December 2012

Al Wasl	1 – 2 (a.e.t.)	Dubba Al Fujairah

20 December 2012

Ajman	1 – 2	Al Jazira

20 December 2012

Dubai	0 – 2	Bani Yas

20 December 2012

Al Shabab	3 – 1	Al Nasr

20 December 2012

Al Ain	4 – 0	Al Fujairah

21 December 2012

Al Sharjah	3 – 1	Ittihad Kalba

== Quarter finals ==
The eight winning teams from the third round advance to the Quarter Finals, played on 2, 10 and 11 February.

2 February 2013

Al Shabab	1 – 0	Al Sharjah

10 February 2013

Al Ain	2 – 1	Bani Yas

10 February 2013

Al Wahda	2 – 1	Al Jazira

11 February 2013

Al Ahli	1 – 0	Dubba Al Fujairah

== Semi finals ==
5 May 2013

Al Ain	1 – 2	Al Ahli

6 May 2013

Al Shabab	2 – 0	Al Wahda

== Final ==
28 May 2013

Al Ahli	4 – 3	Al Shabab

Referee: Fahad Al Qasar
