= Quique Sánchez Flores =

Spanish footballer (born 1965)

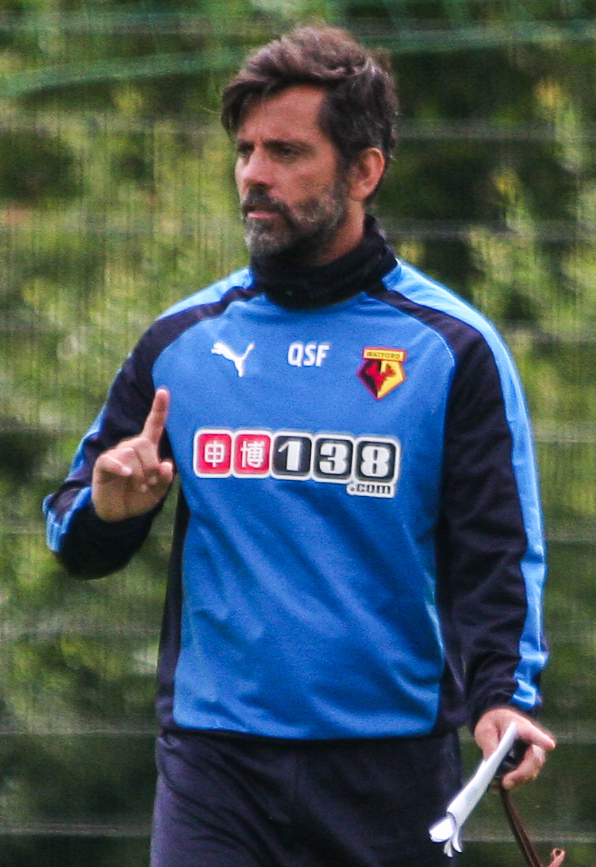
- Flores as manager of Watford in 2015

Personal information
- Full name: Enrique Sánchez Flores
- Date of birth: 5 February 1965 (age 61)
- Place of birth: Madrid, Spain
- Height: 1.76 m (5 ft 9 in)
- Position: Right-back

Team information
- Current team: Alavés (manager)

Youth career
- CD Pegaso

Senior career*
Years	Team	Apps	(Gls)
1984–1994	Valencia	272	(23)
1994–1996	Real Madrid	63	(2)
1996–1997	Zaragoza	9	(0)
Total		344	(25)

International career
1982–1983	Spain U18	9	(0)
1984–1986	Spain U21	13	(0)
1986–1987	Spain U23	2	(0)
1987–1991	Spain	15	(0)

Managerial career
- 2001–2004: Real Madrid (youth)
- 2004–2005: Getafe
- 2005–2007: Valencia
- 2008–2009: Benfica
- 2009–2011: Atlético Madrid
- 2011–2013: Al-Ahli
- 2013–2014: Al-Ain
- 2015: Getafe
- 2015–2016: Watford
- 2016–2018: Espanyol
- 2018–2019: Shanghai Shenhua
- 2019: Watford
- 2021–2023: Getafe
- 2023–2024: Sevilla
- 2026–: Alavés
- * Club domestic league appearances and goals

Enrique "Quique" Sánchez Flores (Spanish pronunciation: [ˈkike ˈsantʃeθ ˈfloɾes]; born 5 February 1965) is a Spanish professional football manager and former player who played as a right-back. He is the head coach of La Liga club Alavés.

He began his career with Valencia in 1984, going on to amass La Liga totals of 304 games and 16 goals over 12 seasons and also appearing for Real Madrid and Zaragoza in the competition, retiring in 1997. Internationally, he represented Spain at under-18, under-21 and under-23 levels, appearing with the senior side at the 1990 World Cup.

In 2001, Flores began his managerial career when he took charge of Real Madrid's youth team. His first senior post came in 2004, with Getafe, and he also managed Valencia, Atlético Madrid – where he won the 2010 Europa League – and Espanyol in the top division. Abroad, he had spells at Benfica in the Primeira Liga and Watford (twice) in the Premier League, as well as stints in the United Arab Emirates and China.

== Playing career ==
Born in Madrid, Flores spent his first ten years as a senior with Valencia, starting in 1984–85. The club was relegated in his second season, and when it returned to La Liga in the 1987–88 campaign, finished 14th. However, from that point until 1994 the team never ranked lower than seventh, with him as first-choice.

Flores moved to Real Madrid in summer 1994 on a four-year contract, and stayed with the capital side for two seasons, winning the league title in the first one but being deemed surplus to requirements early into the 1996 preseason after complaining to newly-arrived manager Fabio Capello of toenail pains. Subsequently, he had a brief spell with Real Zaragoza, retiring from professional football at the age of 32 with Spanish top flight totals of 304 games and 16 goals; in his only season in the Segunda División, as Valencia won the championship, he posted career-highs with 40 matches and nine goals.

Flores made 15 appearances for the Spain national team, and was included in the 1990 FIFA World Cup squad. On 23 September 1987, he debuted in a 2–0 friendly win against Luxembourg in Castellón de la Plana.

== Coaching career ==
=== Beginnings ===
Flores began his coaching career in 2001 by taking charge of Real Madrid's youth teams. After earning plaudits during his three seasons with the youth teams, he caught the eye of the newly promoted Getafe, also in Madrid.

=== Valencia ===
After the 2004–05 campaign with Getafe, in which they finished in 13th place, Flores was given the opportunity to coach his former club Valencia, succeeding Claudio Ranieri. In his first year, he guided them to third place and thus qualified for the UEFA Champions League where the team went on to reach the quarter-finals, being knocked out by Chelsea.

In May 2007, the Che achieved a top-four league finish and consequently a place in the next Champions League. On 29 October, however, the board of directors dismissed Flores after a string of poor results.

=== Benfica ===
Flores was appointed as manager of Benfica on 24 May 2008. On 8 June of the following year he left the Primeira Liga side by mutual consent, after a third place in the league and winning the domestic league cup.

=== Atlético Madrid ===
On 23 October 2009, Flores signed for Atlético Madrid following the dismissal of Abel Resino, penning a contract until 30 June 2010. At the end of the campaign, he led the team to the ninth position in the domestic competition, but also to two cup finals: the UEFA Europa League against Fulham (2–1 win) and the Copa del Rey, lost to Sevilla.

Frequently clashing with star player Diego Forlán during 2010–11, Flores announced his departure from the Colchoneros before the season ended, with the team finally qualifying for the Europa League.

=== Al Ahli ===
In early May 2011, Flores was linked with a move to Spartak Moscow. On 8 November, however, he was named new coach of UAE Pro League team Al Ahli, replacing Ivan Hašek. He left on 11 June 2013.

=== Al Ain ===
On 28 September 2013, only three months after leaving the country, Flores returned to the United Arab Emirates, being appointed at Al Ain. However, his tenure was brief, as he was dismissed on 8 March 2014 due to poor results.

=== Return to Getafe ===
After nearly nine months without a club, Flores returned to Getafe on 5 January 2015 to succeed Cosmin Contra as the new manager, following the latter's departure to China. His first match in charge took place two days later, and it ended with a 1–1 away draw against Almería in the domestic cup; on 26 February, however, citing personal reasons, he resigned.

=== Watford ===
On 5 June 2015, Flores was appointed the head coach of newly promoted Premier League side Watford, replacing Slaviša Jokanović and being the fifth man to hold that position in twelve months. In December, the team won three and lost only one of their league matches, earning him the Premier League Manager of the Month accolade; his forward Odion Ighalo earned the equivalent award for his five-goal haul that month.

However, despite going on to lead the team to a comfortable mid-table position and the semi-finals of the FA Cup, it was announced on 13 May 2016 that Flores would be leaving at the end of the season.

=== Espanyol ===
On 9 June 2016, Flores returned to Spain, signing a three-year deal to replace Constantin Gâlcă as manager of Espanyol. His second signing was José Antonio Reyes, with whom he had previously worked at Benfica and Atlético.

Flores was dismissed on 20 April 2018, after achieving poor results towards the end of the season. In July, he was on a four-man shortlist for the vacant Egyptian national team manager job.

=== Shanghai Shenhua ===
On 25 December 2018, Flores was appointed as manager of Chinese club Shanghai Shenhua. The following July, he left.

=== Return to Watford ===
Flores returned to Watford on 7 September 2019, replacing his compatriot Javi Gracia who was dismissed the same day. His team completed a comeback from 2–0 down to draw 2–2 with Arsenal at Vicarage Road in his first game back on 15 September. However, one week later, they were defeated 8–0 at the City of Manchester Stadium by Manchester City, with the opposition scoring five goals in the first 15 minutes for their biggest ever Premier League win.

On 30 November 2019, Watford went away to Southampton and lost 2–1. The next day, Flores was sacked after securing only a single victory in his second stint in charge.

=== Third Getafe spell ===
On 6 October 2021, Flores was presented as Getafe manager for the third time, after Míchel was dismissed for not winning any of the first eight games of the season. His team were eliminated from the second round of the Spanish Cup on 16 December with a 5–0 loss at Atlético Baleares of the Primera Federación, but seventeen days later achieved the first victory over Real Madrid in nearly nine years with a lone goal by Enes Ünal.

Flores' side finished 15th in his first campaign back. On 27 April 2023, he was relieved of his duties as they fought relegation with seven matches remaining, and was replaced by another returnee, José Bordalás.

=== Sevilla ===
On 18 December 2023, Flores was appointed at Sevilla, signing a contract until 2025; he was their third coach of the campaign after José Luis Mendilibar and Diego Alonso. He won on his debut the following day, 3–0 at second-bottom Granada.

During a match at Getafe on 30 March 2024, Sánchez Flores, of Spanish Gypsy ancestry, was the victim of racist abuse from behind the coaches' benches. As a result of chants against Marcos Acuña in the same game, the hosts were ordered to close sections of their stadium for three matches and fined; however, as the insults against the manager were not mentioned in the referee's report, no action was taken with regards to them.

On 18 May 2024, having secured survival, Sánchez Flores announced he would be leaving the Ramón Sánchez-Pizjuán Stadium on 30 June.

=== Alavés ===
On 3 March 2026, Sánchez Flores took over Alavés in the top tier on a deal until June 2028. In his third match, he led his side to a 4–3 away win over Celta de Vigo after being 3–0 down.

== Personal life ==
Flores is the nephew of flamenco singer and dancer Lola Flores. His father, Isidro, was also a footballer and a defender, and Alfredo Di Stéfano was his godfather. His brother and son, named Isidro and Enrique respectively, played football at lower levels.

In 2025, Flores started a relationship with actress Blanca Romero.

== Managerial statistics ==
As of match played 21 November 2026

Team	From	To	Record								Ref
Team	From	To	G	W	D	L	GF	GA	GD	Win %	Ref
Getafe	8 July 2004	31 May 2005	42	15	11	16	44	51	−7	35.71	
Valencia	31 May 2005	29 October 2007	116	59	27	30	172	115	+57	50.86	
Benfica	24 May 2008	8 June 2009	44	23	12	9	73	47	+26	52.27	
Atlético Madrid	23 October 2009	22 May 2011	102	42	23	37	164	134	+30	41.18	
Al-Ahli	8 November 2011	11 June 2013	64	33	15	16	133	96	+37	51.56	
Al-Ain	28 September 2013	8 March 2014	23	11	8	4	43	24	+19	47.83	
Getafe	5 January 2015	26 February 2015	11	4	1	6	9	13	−4	36.36	
Watford	5 June 2015	16 May 2016	44	16	9	19	46	54	−8	36.36	
Espanyol	9 June 2016	20 April 2018	79	26	26	27	84	98	−14	32.91	
Shanghai Shenhua	25 December 2018	3 July 2019	17	5	3	9	23	28	−5	29.41	
Watford	7 September 2019	1 December 2019	12	2	4	6	9	23	−14	16.67	
Getafe	6 October 2021	27 April 2023	66	18	24	24	71	80	−9	27.27	
Sevilla	18 December 2023	30 June 2024	25	10	4	11	33	33	+0	40.00	
Alavés	3 March 2026	Present	26	9	8	9	45	41	+4	34.62	
Career totals			671	273	175	223	949	837	+112	40.69	—

== Honours ==
=== Player ===
Valencia

- Segunda División: 1986–87

Real Madrid

- La Liga: 1994–95

Spain U21

- UEFA European Under-21 Championship: 1986

=== Manager ===
Benfica

- Taça da Liga: 2008–09

Atlético Madrid

- UEFA Europa League: 2009–10
- UEFA Super Cup: 2010
- Copa del Rey runner-up: 2009–10

Al Ahli

- UAE League Cup: 2011–12
- UAE President's Cup: 2012–13

Al Ain

- UAE President's Cup: 2013–14

Individual

- Premier League Manager of the Month: December 2015
- La Liga Manager of the Month: August 2026
