= Cantus Mundi =

Romanian music education program

- Choir
- Founded: 2011
- Founder: Ion Marin
- Genre: Classical
- Headquarters: Bucharest
- Affiliation: The National Chamber Choir Madrigal - Marin Constantin
- Website: http://www.cantusmundi.com

Cantus Mundi, founded in 2011 (Note: It is also said to have been founded in 2012.) by conductor Ion Marin, is the first national musical program of its kind in Romania. It teaches Romanian children to sing who do not have the financial resources for the training. Its goal is also to provide a means for social integration for the children across economic classes. Symphony Mundi is a related social program for musical education.

== Founding ==
In 2011, conductor Ion Marin developed the musical program with the assistance of volunteers from the Madrigal – Marin Constantin Choir, The National Chamber Choir. With continuing support from the choir, and under the direction of the Ministry of Culture, it became a national program with Government Decision no. 821/2014.

The Cantus Mundi National Program is coordinated by an Interministerial Committee made of representatives of various institutions, appointed by the order of the Ministry of Culture, Ministry of Regional Development and Public Administration, Ministry of Education and Research and Ministry of Labor and Social Justice.

== Overview ==
Free workshops, led by the chief conductor and members of the National Choir, are held in multiple locations in Romania, serving all 41 of its counties. Students receive musical training, including technical exercises, music theory, vocal tract anatomy, and musical theory. The program also includes teaching children to sing in different languages. Following the workshops, participants can access the Cantus Mundi website, which also has content for choir directors.

In 2013, Cantus Mundi began holding an annual gala attended by children's choirs of the Cantus Mundi network from around the country. On 26 November 2016, 15 choirs were directed by Anna Ungureanu, the conductor of the National Chamber Choir, at the Radio Hall in Bucharest. The choirs came from Bucharest, Focșani, Galați, Buzău, Oradea, and Brăila. In December, there were performance by children's choirs throughout the country.

More than 250,000 children and 4,100 conductors will have participated in the program by its seventh year. On 26 February 2017, more than 120 Hungarian and Romanian youth choirs sang with the National Chamber Choir at an event honoring the late composer Constantin Marin at the National University of Music Bucharest, an expression of the vision for Cantus Mundi.

Its goal is to have choirs in all of the country's schools and to provide training to hundreds of thousands of Romanian emigrants.
