= 1981 UAE President's Cup final =

- Event: 1980–81 UAE President's Cup
| Al Ain | Al Shabab |
| 1 | 3 |
- Date: 28 May 1981

The 1981 UAE President's Cup final was the 5th final of the UAE President's Cup, the Emirati football cup competition. The match was contested by Al Shabab and Al Ain on 28 May 1981. Al Shabab lifted the trophy for the first time with a 3–1 victory over Al Ain.

== Details ==
| Al Ain | 1–3 | Al Shabab |
|---|---|---|
| A. Abdullah | Report | K. Fares; E. Obaid; S. Saeed |
