= 2015–16 UAE President's Cup =

Tournament details
- Country: United Arab Emirates
- Teams: 16

Final positions
- Champions: Al-Jazira (3rd title)
- Runners-up: Al Ain

The 2015–16 UAE President's Cup is the 40th season of the UAE President's Cup, the premier knockout tournament for association football clubs in the United Arab Emirates. winners will qualify for the group stage of the 2017 AFC Champions League.

== Round of 16 ==
Al Wahda 3-4 (E) Al Wasl

Emirates (E) 5-3 Al Fujairah

Al Ahli (E) 4-0 Ajman

Dibba Al Fujairah 1-4 (E) Al Shaab

Al Shabab 1-2 (E) Bani Yas

Al Ain 4-0 Al Ittihad Kalba

Al Sharjah 5-4 Al Nasr

Al Dhafra 0-1 Al Jazira

== Quarter-finals ==
Al Ain (E) 4-2 Al Wasl More info Al Jazira (P) 4-4 Al Sharjah

Al Shaab 1-3 Al Ahli

Emirates 1-1 (P) Bani Yas

== Semi-finals ==
Al Ahli 2-3 Al Jazira

Al Ain (E) 3-2 Bani Yas

== Final ==
29 may 2016

Al Ain 1-1 (5-6) Al Jazira

Al Jazira Won UAE President's Cup
