= 1979 UAE President's Cup final =

- Event: 1978–79 UAE President's Cup
Al Ain	Sharjah
2	2
- After extra time Sharjah won 3–0 on penalties
- Venue: Emirates Club Stadium, Abu Dhabi

The 1979 UAE President's Cup final was the third final of the UAE President's Cup, the Emirati football cup competition. The match was contested by Sharjah and Al Ain. Sharjah was awarded the trophy for the first time after defeating Al Ain on the penalties, after 2-2.

== Details ==
Al Ain	2–2 (a.e.t.)	Sharjah
A. Abdullah	Report	J. Rabee; R. Mohamed
Penalties
Al Sherif Mostafa (penalty missed); Ahmed Abdullah (penalty missed); Subait Anbar (penalty missed)	0–3	(penalty scored) Haider Omar; (penalty scored) Ramadan Mohamed; (penalty scored) Salim Hadid

Emirates Club Stadium, Abu Dhabi
