= List of United Arab Emirates football transfers summer 2011 =

This is a list of United Arab Emirates football transfers for the summer sale in 2011–12 season. Only moves from Pro-League are listed.

The summer transfer window will open on 1 June 2011, although a few transfers may take place prior to that date. The window will close on 31 August 2011.

== Summer transfer window ==
Date	Name	Moving from	Moving to	Fee
2011-05-6	(Chile) Edson Puch	Club Universidad de Chile	(United Arab Emirates) Al Wasl FC	$4m
2011-05-22	(United Arab Emirates) Mubarak Hassan	(United Arab Emirates) Fujairah Club	(United Arab Emirates) Al Wasl FC	AED3m
2011-05-24	(United Arab Emirates) Khalaf Ismail	(United Arab Emirates) Al Wasl FC	(United Arab Emirates) Ajman Club	Undisclosed
2011-05-27	(United Arab Emirates) Ali Rabee	(United Arab Emirates) Emirates Club	(United Arab Emirates) Al Wasl FC	Free
2011-05-29	(United Arab Emirates) Hasan Ameen	(United Arab Emirates) Al Wahda S.C.C.	(United Arab Emirates) Al Nasr SC	Free
2011-06-5	(United Arab Emirates) Abdulaziz Ismail	(United Arab Emirates) Al Oruba SC	(United Arab Emirates) Ajman Club	Undisclosed
2011-06-9	(Argentina) Ignacio Scocco	(Greece) AEK Athens F.C.	(United Arab Emirates) Al Ain S.C.C.	€3.5m
2011-06-10	(United Arab Emirates) Amer Mubarak	(United Arab Emirates) Al Nasr SC	(United Arab Emirates) Ahli Dubai	Undisclosed
2011-06-11	(United Arab Emirates) Salem Al Kaabi	(United Arab Emirates) Al Oruba SC	(United Arab Emirates) Ajman Club	Undisclosed
2011-06-11	(United Arab Emirates) Abdullah Hassan	(United Arab Emirates) Al Dhaid	(United Arab Emirates) Ajman Club	Undisclosed
2011-06-12	(Oman) Ahmed Mubarak	(Saudi Arabia) Al Fateh	(United Arab Emirates) Dubai C.S.C.	Undisclosed
2011-06-13	(United Arab Emirates) Mohamed Malallah	(United Arab Emirates) Ittihad Kalba	(United Arab Emirates) Al Ain S.C.C.	Free
2011-06-14	(United Arab Emirates) Boris Kabi	(United Arab Emirates) Ajman Club	Kuwait SC	$1m
2011-06-14	(United Arab Emirates) Youssef Al Hamadi	(United Arab Emirates) Al Jazira Club	(United Arab Emirates) Baniyas SC	Loan
2011-06-14	(Togo) Asimo Iowa	(Germany) 1. FC Nuremberg II	(United Arab Emirates) Al Nasr SC	Undisclosed
2011-06-15	(United Arab Emirates) Ali Mohammad Rashid	(United Arab Emirates) Al Shabab	(United Arab Emirates) Al Jazira Club	Undisclosed
2011-06-15	(United Arab Emirates) Adnan Rashid Bischoh	(United Arab Emirates) Al Shaab	(United Arab Emirates) Al Ain S.C.C.	Undisclosed
2011-06-15	(Algeria) Karim Kerkar	(United Arab Emirates) Emirates Club	(United Arab Emirates) Ajman Club	Undisclosed
2011-06-15	(Brazil) Alexandre Oliveira	(United Arab Emirates) Al Wasl FC	(Brazil) Botafogo FC	Undisclosed
2011-06-16	(United Arab Emirates) Ali Mahmoud	(United Arab Emirates) Al Wasl FC	(United Arab Emirates) Baniyas SC	Free
2011-06-16	(United Arab Emirates) Fahad Masood	(United Arab Emirates) Al Wahda S.C.C.	(United Arab Emirates) Al Wasl FC	Loan
2011-06-18	(United Arab Emirates) Salem Jasim	(United Arab Emirates) Ittihad Kalba	(United Arab Emirates) Al Sharjah SC	Undisclosed
2011-06-20	(United Arab Emirates) Hamad Al Hosani	(United Arab Emirates) Al Dhafra S.C.C.	(United Arab Emirates) Al Wasl FC	Undisclosed
2011-06-20	(Brazil) Grafite	(Germany) VfL Wolfsburg	(United Arab Emirates) Ahli Dubai	€3m
