= 2008–09 UAE President's Cup =

33rd season of UAE's premier knockout football tournament

The 2008–09 UAE President's Cup was the 33rd season of the UAE President's Cup, the premier knockout tournament for association football clubs in the United Arab Emirates. The winner were guaranteed a place in the 2010 AFC Champions League.

Al-Ahli went into this edition as the holders. Sharjah FC hold the most wins with 8 titles.

Al-Ain were the cup winners.

== Round 1 ==
24 teams play a knockout tie. 12 clubs advance to the next round. Ties played over 30 & 31 October 2008

Tie no	Home team	Score	Away team
1	Al-Shaab	1 – 2	Ittihad Kalba
2	Ras Al-Khaimah	1 - 0	Al-Jazira Al-Hamra
3	Dubba Al-Husun	3 - 1	Dubai
4	Al-Sharjah	2 - 1	Al-Arabi
5	Al-Wasl	3 - 0	Al-Hamriyah
6	Al-Wahda	4 - 3	Hatta
7	Khaleej	2 - 2	Al-Rams
Khaleej won 4 - 3 on penalties
8	Emirate	3 - 1	Al-Oruba
9	Al-Ain	8 - 0	Dabba Al-Fujairah
10	Al Dhafra	4 - 0	Al-Thaid
11	Ajman Club	2 - 3	Al-Fujirah
12	Banni Yas	4 - 0	Masafi

== Round 2 ==
16 teams play a knockout tie. 8 clubs advance to the next round. Ties played over 28 & 29 November 2008

Tie no	Home team	Score	Away team
1	Al-Shabbab ACD	4 – 1	Ras Al-Khaimah
2	Al-Jazira Club	3 - 1	Al-Wasl
3	Al-Sharjah	6 - 1	Ittihad Kalba
4	Al-Wahda	4 - 1	Dubba Al-Husun
5	Al Dhafra	2 - 1	Emirate
6	Al-Nasr	2 -3	Khaleej
7	Al-Ain	4 - 0	Al-Fujirah
8	Banni Yas	1 - 0	Al-Ahli

== Quarter finals ==
8 teams play a knockout tie. 4 clubs advance to the next round. Ties played over 1 & 2 February 2009

Tie no	Home team	Score	Away team
1	Al-Shabbab ACD	2 – 1	Al-Sharjah
2	Al-Jazira Club	0 - 0	Al-Wahda
Al-Wahda won 4 - 2 on penalties
3	Al Dhafra	3 - 1	Khaleej
4	Al Ain	3 - 2	Banni Yas

== Semi finals ==
4 teams play a knockout tie. 2 clubs advance to the Final Ties played on 24 February 2009

Tie no	Home team	Score	Away team
1	Al Dhafra	1 – 3	Al Ain
2	Al-Wahda	1 - 2	Al-Shabbab ACD

== Final ==
13 April 2009

Tie no	Home team	Score	Away team
1	Al-Shabbab ACD	0 - 1	Al Ain

UAE President Cup
2008–09 Winners
Al Ain
5th Title
