= Ion Marin =

Romanian-Austrian conductor

Ion Marin (born 8 July 1960) is a Romanian-Austrian conductor. He is internationally renowned both in operatic and symphonic domains.

== Early life ==
Born in Bucharest, son of choir conductor Constantin Marin, founder of the Madrigal Choir, Ion Marin started studying piano and violin at the age of three. He graduated from the George Enescu Music College in 1979. In 1983 he graduated in composition at the National Music Academy of Bucharest, where he studied with Tiberiu Olah and Anatol Vieru. His education was completed at the Salzburg Mozarteum with Carlo Zecchi and the Accademia Chigiana in Siena with Franco Ferrara.

Following his debut in 1981, he was appointed chief conductor of the Arad Philharmonic (Transylvania). He founded the Transylvania Chamber Orchestra that he toured in France and Italy in 1983 and 1985. Between 1982 and 1985 he guest conducted most of Romanian orchestras as well as orchestras in Czechoslovakia, German Democratic Republic and the Soviet Union.

In 1986 Marin received the Gottfried von Herder Preis-Stipendium of the Vienna University. He sought political asylum in Austria and was condemned in absence by the Romanian Ceausescu regime. He returned to conduct in Romania in 2007.

== Career ==
In May 1987 Marin conducted Berg's Wozzeck at the Vienna State Opera and was hired by Claudio Abbado as his assistant conductor. In February 1988 he made his official debut with Maria Stuarda (Gruberova, Baltsa, Araiza) and became resident conductor under Abbado's tenure as music director.

Until 1991 he conducted at the Vienna State Opera a large repertoire from Mozart to Alban Berg.

In Vienna he collaborated with some of the world's greatest singers: Luciano Pavarotti (Un ballo in maschera), José Carreras (Carmen), Thomas Hampson, Gundula Janowitz, Hermann Prey (Le nozze di Figaro), Ruggero Raimondi, Agnes Baltsa (L'italiana in Algeri), Hildegard Behrens (Wozzeck), Éva Marton (Elektra), Giuseppe Taddei (L'elisir d'amore).

In 1988 he received the Austrian citizenship by presidential decree, for special contribution to the Republic of Austria.

He was awarded the title of Commander of the Order of Merit by the President of Romania in 2019.

Starting with the academic year 2020/2021, Ion Marin has been appointed as Endowed Professor of the Claudio Abbado Chair for conducting by the Mozarteum University in Salzburg. He is also the Artistic Director of the University's symphonic activities.

In January 2021, Ion Marin was awarded by the French Government the title of Chevalier des Arts et des Lettres.

== Opera activity – highlights ==
Since 1988, Marin conducted in major opera houses around the world.

New productions highlights:

- Metropolitan Opera New York – Ariadne auf Naxos (1993), La Rondine (2013), Semiramide (1992), The Magic Flute (1994)
- Teatro alla Scala – Manon (2006)
- Bavarian State Opera Munich – Werther (2004, 2005), Eugene Onegin (2008)
- Paris Opera Bastille – Les contes d'Hoffmann (1992)
- Semperoper Dresden – A Midsummer Night's Dream (2002)
- Zurich Opera – La cenerentola (2007)
- Deutsche Oper Berlin – Cavalleria rusticana/Pagliacci (2005), L'italiana in Algeri (2003)
- San Francisco Opera – La Rondine (2007), Il barbiere di Siviglia (1992)
- Nuovo Piccolo Teatro Milano – Così fan tutte (1999)
- Hamburg State Opera – Nabucco (2004)
- Copenhagen Opera House – Billy Budd (2002), The Rake's Progress (2010)
- Teatro La Fenice – L'italiana in Algeri (1991), Le nozze di Figaro (1992)

== Symphonic concerts – highlights ==
Without ever pursuing permanent positions, Marin guest conducting activity include:

- Germany: Berlin Philharmonic (2007, 2010), Bavarian Radio Symphony (2000, 2002, 2003, 2004), Gewandhaus Leipzig (1999, 2005), Staatskapelle Dresden (concerts and tours 1997–2005), Munich Philharmonic (concerts and tours 2002–2008), Radio Symphony Orchestra Berlin (concerts and tours (2001–2008, 2016). Since 2014 principal guest conductor of the Hamburger Symphoniker. In 2004 he founded the Philharmonic Sinfonietta Berlin with members of the Berlin Philharmonic, that he toured between 2005 and 2008 in Europe, Japan and Korea
- United Kingdom: London Symphony Orchestra (concerts and tours 1991–1995, 2006, 2007, 2015), Philharmonia Orchestra (2004, 2005, 2007), London Philharmonic (1998, 2002, 2006), Royal Philharmonic (2012), Bournemouth Symphony (2014), BBC Scottish (2000–2003)
- France: Orchestre National de France (2004–2008), Philharmonique de Radio France (2009, 2012), Orchestre National d'Île-de-France (2004–2015), Philharmonique de Monte Carlo (2002–2012), Orchestre de L'Opera Bastille (1993, 2007)
- Russia: St.Petersburg Philharmonic (2013–2016), Svetlanov State Symphony (2006–2015), Bolshoi Opera Orchestra (2009), Moscow Virtuosi (2007). Between 2004 and 2008 he was first guest conductor of the National Philharmonic Orchestra of Russia.
- Japan: NHK Symphony (2009–2012), Tokyo Metropolitan Orchestra (2010, 2013), Osaka Philharmonic (2010, 2012, 2014), New Japan Philharmonic (2008, 2011)
- Czech Republic: Czech Philharmonic (concerts and tours 2008–2013), Prague Radio Symphony (2014)
- Hungary: Budapest Festival Orchestra (2007, 2010), Budapest Philharmonic Orchestra (2011–2015)

Festival appearances between 1993 and 1996 include: Philadelphia Orchestra, Israel Philharmonic, Orchestra dell'Accademia di Santa Cecilia, Orchestre de Paris.

== Discography ==
Marin's discography earned him three Grammy Award nominations (1992, 1993, 1994), a Diapason d'Or (1992) and the Echo Klassik Award (2012).

Album	Orchestra	Label	Year
Max Bruch, Violin Concertos – Guy Braunstein	Bamberger Symphoniker	Tudor	2013
Marta Argerich: Lugano Concerts	Marta Argerich: Lugano Concerts	Deutsche Grammophon	2012
The Waldbühne Box	Berliner Philharmoniker	Euro Arts	2012
Legacy, David Garrett	Royal Philharmonic	Decca	2011
Dvorak, Symphony no. 9	Czech Philharmonic	Exton	2011
An evening with Renee Fleming	Berliner Philharmoniker	EuroArts	2010
Salut – Piotr Beczala	Munich Radio Orchestra	Orfeo	2008
Rossini, La Cenerentola Bartoli, Widmer, Osborn, Chausson	Zurich Opera Orchestra	House of Opera	2007
Bruckner, Symphony no.4	BBC Scottish	BBC Music	2004
Live from Covent Garden – Angela Gheorghiu	Royal Opera Covent Garden	Emi	2002
Mahler, Symphony no.4	BBC Scottish	BBC Music	2001
Mysterium – Angela Gheorghiu	London Philharmonic	Decca	2001
Joaquin Rodrigo Panorama	Philarmonia Orchestra	Deutsche Grammophon	2000
Barbara Hendricks – Mozart	English Chamber Orchestra	Emi	1998
Dmitri Dimitri Hvorostovsky	Philharmonia Orchestra	Philips	1997
Placido Domingo Duetsy	London Symphony	Deutsche Grammophon	1994
Bel Canto – Dimitri Hvorostovsky	Philharmonia Orchestra	Philips	1994
Rossini, Semiramide Studer, Ramey, Lopardo, Larmore	London Symphony	Deutsche Grammophon	1994
Donizetti, Lucia di Lamermoor Studer, Domingo, Pons, Ramey	London Symphony	Deutsche Grammophon	1993
Rossini, Il Signor Bruschino Battle, Ramey, Lopardo, Larmore	English Chamber Orchestra	Deutsche Grammophon	1993
Khatchaturian Flute Concerto – Patrick Gallois	Philharmonia Orchestra	Deutsche Grammophon	1992
Rossini Heroines – Cecilia Bartoli	Teatro La Fenice	Decca	1992
Ave Maria – Cheryl Studer	London Symphony	Deutsche Grammophon	1992
Agnes Baltsa sings Rossini	Wiener Symphonikery	Sony Classical	1991
Ferruccio Furlaneto sings Mozart	Wiener Symphonikery	Sony Classical	1991

== Social involvement ==
In 2011, Marin created in Romania the Cantus Mundi project, a social integration initiative based on choral singing and aiming to overcome all sorts of discrimination, by bringing together Romania's children, rich and poor, motion handicapped, ethnic minorities, blind, autistic and orphans. In 2014, by Governmental decision, Cantus Mundi became a National Program and is implemented throughout the country. It aims to reach 250,000 children over the next three years. The complementary part of the project, Symphonia Mundi, based on instrumental group playing has been launched in 2016.
