= 2018 FIFA Club World Cup squads =

Each team in the 2018 FIFA Club World Cup had to name a 23-man squad (three of whom must be goalkeepers). FIFA announced the squads on 6 December 2018. The squad of the CONMEBOL representative was confirmed after the 2018 Copa Libertadores Finals second leg on 9 December 2018.

== Al Ain ==
Manager: (Croatia) Zoran Mamić

Note: Flags indicate national team as defined under FIFA eligibility rules; some limited exceptions apply. Players may hold more than one non-FIFA nationality.

No.	Pos.	Nation	Player
1	GK	UAE	Mohammed Busanda
3	MF	MLI	Tongo Doumbia
5	DF	UAE	Ismail Ahmed (Captain)
6	MF	UAE	Amer Abdulrahman
7	MF	BRA	Caio
9	FW	SWE	Marcus Berg
11	MF	UAE	Bandar Al-Ahbabi
12	GK	UAE	Hamad Al-Mansouri
13	MF	UAE	Ahmed Barman
14	DF	UAE	Mohammed Fayez
16	MF	UAE	Mohamed Abdulrahman
17	GK	UAE	Khalid Eisa

No.	Pos.	Nation	Player
18	MF	CIV	Ibrahim Diaky
19	DF	UAE	Mohanad Salem
23	DF	UAE	Mohamed Ahmed
28	MF	UAE	Sulaiman Nasser
30	MF	UAE	Mohammed Khalfan
33	MF	JPN	Tsukasa Shiotani
43	MF	UAE	Rayan Yaslam
44	DF	UAE	Saeed Jumaa
74	MF	EGY	Hussein El Shahat
88	MF	EGY	Yahya Nader
99	FW	UAE	Jamal Ibrahim

== Guadalajara ==
Manager: (Paraguay) José Cardozo

Note: Flags indicate national team as defined under FIFA eligibility rules; some limited exceptions apply. Players may hold more than one non-FIFA nationality.

No.	Pos.	Nation	Player
1	GK	MEX	Raúl Gudiño
2	DF	MEX	Josecarlos Van Rankin
3	DF	MEX	Carlos Salcido (Captain)
4	DF	MEX	Jair Pereira
5	DF	MEX	Hedgardo Marín
6	DF	MEX	Edwin Hernández
7	MF	MEX	Orbelín Pineda
9	FW	MEX	Alan Pulido
10	MF	MEX	Javier Eduardo López
11	MF	MEX	Isaác Brizuela
13	MF	MEX	Walter Sandoval
14	MF	MEX	Ángel Zaldívar

No.	Pos.	Nation	Player
16	DF	MEX	Miguel Ángel Ponce
17	DF	MEX	Jesús Sánchez García
23	FW	MEX	José de Jesús Godínez
25	MF	MEX	Michael Pérez Ortiz
28	DF	MEX	Juan Miguel Basulto
29	MF	MEX	Alejandro Zendejas
31	MF	MEX	Alan Cervantes
34	GK	MEX	Miguel Jiménez Ponce
35	GK	MEX	Antonio Torres
36	MF	MEX	Fernando Beltrán
37	FW	MEX	César Huerta

== Espérance Sportive de Tunis ==
Manager: (Tunisia) Moïne Chaâbani

Note: Flags indicate national team as defined under FIFA eligibility rules; some limited exceptions apply. Players may hold more than one non-FIFA nationality.

No.	Pos.	Nation	Player
1	GK	TUN	Moez Ben Cherifia
2	DF	TUN	Ali Machani
3	DF	TUN	Aymen Mahmoud
5	DF	TUN	Chamseddine Dhaouadi
7	FW	TUN	Edem Rjaïbi
8	MF	TUN	Anice Badri
9	FW	TUN	Bilel Mejri
11	FW	ALG	Youcef Belaïli
12	DF	TUN	Khalil Chemmam (Captain)
13	MF	TUN	Mohamed Ali Ben Romdhane
14	FW	TUN	Haythem Jouini
15	MF	CIV	Fousseny Coulibaly

No.	Pos.	Nation	Player
18	MF	TUN	Saad Bguir
19	GK	TUN	Rami Jridi
20	MF	TUN	Ayman Ben Mohamed
22	DF	TUN	Sameh Derbali
23	GK	TUN	Ali Jemal
24	DF	TUN	Iheb Mbarki
25	MF	TUN	Ghailene Chaalali
26	DF	TUN	Houcine Rabii
28	MF	TUN	Mohamed Amine Meskini
29	FW	TUN	Taha Yassine Khenissi
30	MF	CMR	Franck Kom

== Kashima Antlers ==
Manager: (Japan) Go Oiwa

Note: Flags indicate national team as defined under FIFA eligibility rules; some limited exceptions apply. Players may hold more than one non-FIFA nationality.

No.	Pos.	Nation	Player
1	GK	KOR	Kwoun Sun-tae
2	DF	JPN	Atsuto Uchida
3	DF	JPN	Gen Shoji
4	MF	BRA	Léo Silva
6	MF	JPN	Ryota Nagaki
8	MF	JPN	Shoma Doi
11	MF	BRA	Leandro
14	FW	JPN	Takeshi Kanamori
16	DF	JPN	Shuto Yamamoto
18	MF	BRA	Serginho
19	FW	JPN	Kazuma Yamaguchi
21	GK	JPN	Hitoshi Sogahata

No.	Pos.	Nation	Player
22	DF	JPN	Daigo Nishi
25	MF	JPN	Yasushi Endo
26	MF	JPN	Kazune Kubota
28	DF	JPN	Koki Machida
29	GK	JPN	Shinichiro Kawamata
30	FW	JPN	Hiroki Abe
32	DF	JPN	Koki Anzai
35	DF	KOR	Jung Seung-hyun
36	MF	JPN	Toshiya Tanaka
39	DF	JPN	Tomoya Inukai
40	MF	JPN	Mitsuo Ogasawara (Captain)

== Real Madrid ==
Manager: (Argentina) Santiago Solari

Note: Flags indicate national team as defined under FIFA eligibility rules; some limited exceptions apply. Players may hold more than one non-FIFA nationality.

No.	Pos.	Nation	Player
1	GK	CRC	Keylor Navas
2	DF	ESP	Dani Carvajal
3	DF	ESP	Jesús Vallejo
4	DF	ESP	Sergio Ramos (Captain)
5	DF	FRA	Raphaël Varane
6	DF	ESP	Nacho
8	MF	GER	Toni Kroos
9	FW	FRA	Karim Benzema
10	MF	CRO	Luka Modrić
11	FW	WAL	Gareth Bale
12	DF	BRA	Marcelo
13	GK	ESP	Kiko Casilla

No.	Pos.	Nation	Player
14	MF	BRA	Casemiro
15	MF	URU	Federico Valverde
17	FW	ESP	Lucas Vázquez
18	MF	ESP	Marcos Llorente
19	DF	ESP	Álvaro Odriozola
20	MF	ESP	Marco Asensio
22	MF	ESP	Isco
23	DF	ESP	Sergio Reguilón
24	MF	ESP	Dani Ceballos
25	GK	BEL	Thibaut Courtois
28	FW	BRA	Vinícius Júnior

== River Plate ==
Manager: (Argentina) Marcelo Gallardo

Note: Flags indicate national team as defined under FIFA eligibility rules; some limited exceptions apply. Players may hold more than one non-FIFA nationality.

No.	Pos.	Nation	Player
1	GK	ARG	Franco Armani
2	DF	ARG	Jonatan Maidana
4	DF	PAR	Jorge Moreira
5	MF	ARG	Bruno Zuculini
7	FW	URU	Rodrigo Mora
8	MF	COL	Juan Fernando Quintero
9	FW	ARG	Julián Álvarez
10	MF	ARG	Gonzalo Martínez
11	MF	URU	Nicolás De La Cruz
14	GK	ARG	Germán Lux
15	MF	ARG	Exequiel Palacios
18	MF	URU	Camilo Mayada

No.	Pos.	Nation	Player
19	FW	COL	Rafael Santos Borré
20	DF	ARG	Milton Casco
22	DF	ARG	Javier Pinola
23	MF	ARG	Leonardo Ponzio (Captain)
24	MF	ARG	Enzo Pérez
25	GK	ARG	Enrique Bologna
26	MF	ARG	Ignacio Fernández
27	FW	ARG	Lucas Pratto
28	DF	ARG	Lucas Martínez Quarta
29	DF	ARG	Gonzalo Montiel
32	FW	ARG	Ignacio Scocco

== Team Wellington ==
Manager: (England) Jose Figueira

Note: Flags indicate national team as defined under FIFA eligibility rules; some limited exceptions apply. Players may hold more than one non-FIFA nationality.

No.	Pos.	Nation	Player
1	GK	NZL	Scott Basalaj
2	DF	NZL	Justin Gulley (Captain)
3	DF	NZL	Scott Hilliar
4	DF	NZL	Mario Ilich
5	DF	NZL	Liam Wood
6	DF	NZL	Taylor Schrijvers
7	MF	IRL	Eric Molloy
8	MF	NZL	Henry Cameron
9	FW	NZL	Tom Jackson
10	FW	NZL	Nathanael Hailemariam
11	MF	ARG	Mario Barcia
12	MF	NZL	Andy Bevin

No.	Pos.	Nation	Player
14	MF	NZL	Jack-Henry Sinclair
15	DF	SOL	Michael Boso
16	FW	NZL	Angus Kilkolly
17	DF	NZL	Alex Palezevic
18	MF	NZL	Aaron Clapham
19	FW	Guernsey	Ross Allen
20	MF	NZL	Tiahn Manuel
21	FW	NZL	Hamish Watson
22	GK	NZL	Marcel Kampman
23	GK	NZL	Charlie Morris
24	FW	MTQ	Steven Lecefel
