= Ahmed bin Saqr al-Qassimi =

Ahmed bin Saqr al-Qasimi
- Citizenship: Emiratis

Sheikh Ahmed bin Saqr Al Qasimi is Chairman of the Ras Al Khaimah Department of Customs and Seaports.

He purchased a 60% stake in an unnamed British Premier League football club in June 2009.
