= 2011–12 UAE President's Cup =

Tournament details
- Country: United Arab Emirates

Final positions
- Champions: Al Jazira
- Runners-up: Baniyas

The 2011–12 UAE President's Cup is the 36th season of the UAE President's Cup, the premier knockout tournament for association football clubs in the United Arab Emirates.

The tournament was changed from previous editions and featured all 12 clubs from the Pro League, and the top four teams of the Federation Cup. The winners will qualify for the group stage of the 2013 AFC Champions League.

== Round of 16 ==
Round of 16 consisted of eight matches played on 17–18 December 2011. The winners of those matches advanced to Quarterfinals.

Team 1	Score	Team 2
17 December 2011
Al Wahda	4–0	Dubai
Ajman	1–0	Dibba Al-Hisn
Al Nasr	0–1	Baniyas
Al-Ittihad Kalba	3–2	Al Dhafra
18 December 2011
Al Ain	4–2	Emirates
Al Shabab	2–4 (a.e.t)	Al Jazira
Al Ahli	0–4	Al Wasl
Al Sharjah	2–1	Al Khaleej Club

== Quarter-finals ==
Team 1	Score	Team 2
9 January 2011
Al-Ittihad Kalba	0–3	Al Sharjah
Ajman	2–6	Al Jazira
10 January 2011
Al Wahda	3–2	Al Wasl
Baniyas	1–0 (a.e.t)	Al Ain

== Semifinals ==
The matches will be played on 8 April 2012.

8 April 2012

Al Sharjah	1 – 4	Al Jazira

8 April 2012

Al Wahda	1 – 3	Baniyas

== Final ==
23 April 2012

Al Jazira	3 – 1	Baniyas

Sheikh Zayed Stadium, Abu Dhabi

UAE President's Cup
2011–12 Winners
Al Jazira
Second title
