= UAE President's Cup =

UAE President Cup
- Founded: 1974; 52 years ago
- Country: United Arab Emirates
- Confederation: Asian Football Confederation
- Number of clubs: 16
- Current champions: Al Ain (8 titles) (2025–26)
- Most championships: Shabab Al Ahli (11 titles)
- Broadcaster(s): Abu Dhabi Sports; Dubai Sports; Sharjah Sports; DAZN
- Current: 2026–27 UAE President's Cup

The UAE President's Cup, or simply the President Cup, is a football tournament that takes place in United Arab Emirates, between clubs in the UAE Pro League and the UAE First Division League. The winner qualifies for the preliminary stage of AFC Champions League Elite.

== History ==
The UAE President's Cup started in the 1974–75 season, held by United Arab Emirates Football Association. Shabab Al Ahli and Sharjah are the competition's most successful club with ten wins. Al Ain has contested the most finals with fourteen. The first match of the President's Cup, played on March 20, 1974, between Al Wasl, Ajman ended 2–3, Ali Saeed scored the first goal of the competition. Kuwaiti Ghazi Al-Qandi is the first referee to run a final match of the Cup, on April 11, 1975.

== Finals ==
The final match is often held in a major stadium in the UAE, such as the Zayed Sports City Stadium in Abu Dhabi, and is a major event in the UAE's sports calendar.

#	Season	Champion	Final score	Runner-up	Date	Venue
1	1974–75	Al Ahli	2–0	Al Nasr	11 April 1975	Dubai Stadium, Dubai
	1975–76	not completed				
2	1976–77	Al Ahli	1–1 (a.e.t., 4–3 pens.)	Al Shabab		Dubai Stadium, Dubai
	1977–78	cancelled				
3	1978–79	Sharjah	2–2 (a.e.t., 3–0 pens.)	Al Ain	29 April 1979	Emirates Club Stadium, Abu Dhabi
4	1979–80	Sharjah	1–0	Al Nasr		Zayed Sports City Stadium, Abu Dhabi
5	1980–81	Al Shabab	3–1	Al Ain		
6	1981–82	Sharjah	2–0	Al Shaab		Zayed Sports City Stadium, Abu Dhabi
7	1982–83	Sharjah	2–0	Al Wasl		Zayed Sports City Stadium, Abu Dhabi
8	1983–84	Ajman	0–0 (4–1 pens.)	Al Nasr		
9	1984–85	Al Nasr	3–0	Al Shabab		
10	1985–86	Al Nasr	2–1	Al Wasl		
11	1986–87	Al Wasl	2–0	Al Khaleej		
12	1987–88	Al Ahli	3–2	Al Shabab		
13	1988–89	Al Nasr	1–0	Al Wahda	27 April 1989	Mohammed bin Zayed Stadium, Abu Dhabi
14	1989–90	Al Shabab	2–1	Al Ain		
15	1990–91	Sharjah	3–0	Al Wasl		
16	1991–92	Baniyas	2–1 (a.e.t.)	Al Nasr		
17	1992–93	Al Shaab	2–1	Al Wasl		
18	1993–94	Al Shabab	1–0	Al Ain		
19	1994–95	Sharjah	0–0 (a.e.t., 5–4 pens.)	Al Ain		
20	1995–96	Al Ahli	4–1	Al Wahda		
21	1996–97	Al Shabab	1–1 (a.e.t., 5–4 pens.)	Al Nasr		
22	1997–98	Sharjah	3–2 (asdet)	Al Wasl		
23	1998–99	Al Ain	1–0 (asdet)	Al Shabab		
24	1999–00	Al Wahda	1–1 (asdet, 8–7 pens.)	Al Wasl		
25	2000–01	Al Ain	3–2	Al Shaab		
26	2001–02	Al Ahli	3–1	Al Jazira		
27	2002–03	Sharjah	1–1 (asdet, 6–5 pens.)	Al Wahda		
28	2003–04	Al Ahli	2–1	Al Shaab	2 June 2004	Mohammed bin Zayed Stadium, Abu Dhabi
29	2004–05	Al Ain	3–1 (a.e.t.)	Al Wahda	16 June 2005	Zayed Sports City Stadium, Abu Dhabi
30	2005–06	Al Ain	2–1	Sharjah	3 April 2006	Zayed Sports City Stadium, Abu Dhabi
31	2006–07	Al Wasl	4–1	Al Ain	3 April 2007	Zayed Sports City Stadium, Abu Dhabi
32	2007–08	Al Ahli	2–0	Al Wasl	14 April 2008	Zayed Sports City Stadium, Abu Dhabi
33	2008–09	Al Ain	1–0	Al Shabab	13 April 2009	Mohammed bin Zayed Stadium, Abu Dhabi
34	2009–10	Emirates	3–1	Al Shabab	19 April 2010	Zayed Sports City Stadium, Abu Dhabi
35	2010–11	Al Jazira	4–0	Al Wahda	11 April 2011	Zayed Sports City Stadium, Abu Dhabi
36	2011–12	Al Jazira	3–1	Baniyas	23 April 2012	Zayed Sports City Stadium, Abu Dhabi
37	2012–13	Al Ahli	4–3	Al Shabab	28 May 2013	Mohammed bin Zayed Stadium, Abu Dhabi
38	2013–14	Al Ain	1–0	Al Ahli	18 May 2014	Zayed Sports City Stadium, Abu Dhabi
39	2014–15	Al Nasr	1–1 (a.e.t., 3–0 pens.)	Al Ahli	3 June 2015	Hazza bin Zayed Stadium, Al Ain
40	2015–16	Al Jazira	1–1 (a.e.t., 6–5 pens.)	Al Ain	29 May 2016	Zayed Sports City Stadium, Abu Dhabi
41	2016–17	Al Wahda	3–0	Al Nasr	19 May 2017	Zayed Sports City Stadium, Abu Dhabi
42	2017–18	Al Ain	2–1	Al Wasl	3 May 2018	Zayed Sports City Stadium, Abu Dhabi
43	2018–19	Shabab Al Ahli	2–1	Al Dhafra	29 April 2019	Zayed Sports City Stadium, Abu Dhabi
	2019–20	not completed due to COVID-19 Pandemic				
44	2020–21	Shabab Al Ahli	2–1	Al Nasr	16 May 2021	Hazza bin Zayed Stadium, Al Ain
45	2021–22	Sharjah	1−0	Al Wahda	21 October 2022	Hazza bin Zayed Stadium, Al Ain
46	2022–23	Sharjah	1–1 (a.e.t., 14–13 pens.)	Al Ain	28 April 2023	Mohammed bin Zayed Stadium, Abu Dhabi
47	2023–24	Al-Wasl	4−0	Al Nasr	17 May 2024	Hazza bin Zayed Stadium, Al Ain
48	2024–25	Shabab Al Ahli	2−1	Sharjah	9 May 2025	Mohammed bin Zayed Stadium, Abu Dhabi
49	2025–26	Al Ain	4-1	Al Jazira	22 May 2026	Mohammed bin Zayed Stadium, Abu Dhabi

== Performance by club ==
Club	Winners	Runners-up	Winning years	Runner-up years
Shabab Al Ahli	11	2	1975, 1977, 1988, 1996, 2002, 2004, 2008, 2013, 2019, 2021, 2025	2014, 2015
Sharjah	10	2	1979, 1980, 1982, 1983, 1991, 1995, 1998, 2003, 2022, 2023	2006, 2025
Al Ain	8	8	1999, 2001, 2005, 2006, 2009, 2014, 2018, 2026	1979, 1981, 1990, 1994, 1995, 2007, 2016, 2023
Al Nasr	4	8	1985, 1986, 1989, 2015	1975, 1980, 1984, 1992, 1997, 2017, 2021, 2024
Al Shabab	4	7	1981, 1990, 1994, 1997	1977, 1985, 1988, 1999, 2009, 2010, 2013
Al Jazira	3	2	2011, 2012, 2016	2002, 2026
Al Wasl	3	8	1987, 2007, 2024	1983, 1986, 1991, 1993, 1998, 2000, 2008, 2018
Al Wahda	2	6	2000, 2017	1989, 1996, 2003, 2005, 2011, 2022
Al Shaab	1	3	1993	1982, 2001, 2004
Baniyas	1	1	1992	2012
Ajman	1	0	1984	–
Emirates	1	0	2010	–
Al Dhafra	0	1	–	2019
Khor Fakkan	0	1	–	1987
Total	49	49		

== Top scorers ==
=== Top scorers by season ===
Season	Player	Club	Goals
1974–75	(United Arab Emirates) Mohamed Hamdoun	Al Ahli	5
1975–76	Cancelled		
1977–78	Cancelled		
1978–79	(United Arab Emirates) Ahmed Abdullah	Al Ain	5
1982–83	(United Arab Emirates) Adnan Al Talyani	Al Shaab	13
1983–84	(United Arab Emirates) Ahmed Al Mulla	Al Khaleej	4
1984–85	(United Arab Emirates) Khalid Ismail	Al Nasr	7
1985–86	(United Arab Emirates) Fahad Khamees	Al Wasl	6
1987–88	(United Arab Emirates) Khalid Abdullah	Al Shabab	7
1988–89	(United Arab Emirates) Salim Khalifa Alshamsi	Al Wahda	4
1990–91	(United Arab Emirates) Abdulrazzaq Ibrahim	Sharjah	7
1992–93	(United Arab Emirates) Mubarak Mohamed	Al Shaab	4
1998–99	(Kuwait) Jasem Al-Huwaidi	Al Shabab	6
2003–04	(Brazil) Denílson Martins Nascimento	Dubai	21
2004–05	(United Arab Emirates) Ismail Matar	Al Wahda	5
2005–06	(Brazil) Anderson Barbosa	Sharjah	8
2006–07	(Serbia) Nenad Jestrović	Al Ain	4
2007–08	(United Arab Emirates) Ahmed Khalil (United Arab Emirates) Faisal Khalil (Brazil) Alexandre Oliveira (United Arab Emirates) Essa Obaid	Al Ahli; Al Ahli; Al Wasl; Al Shabab	4
2008–09	(Brazil) André Dias	Al Ain	9
2009–10	(France) Michaël N'dri	Ittihad Kalba	11
2010–11	(Brazil) Jader Baré	Al Jazira	5
2011–12	(Brazil) Ricardo Oliveira	Al Jazira	7
2012–13	(Brazil) Edgar Bruno	Al Shabab	4
2013–14	(Ghana) Asamoah Gyan (Brazil) Patrick Fabiano	Al Ain; Fujairah	6
2014–15	(Ghana) Asamoah Gyan (United Arab Emirates) Ahmed Khalil	Al Ain; Al Ahli	4
2015–16	(Brazil) Dyanfres Douglas (United Arab Emirates) Ali Mabkhout	Al Ain; Al Jazira	5
2016–17	(Hungary) Balázs Dzsudzsák (Mali) Mamadou Coulibaly (United Arab Emirates) Hassan Rashid	Al Wahda; Dubai; Dibba Al Hisn	5
2017–18	(Brazil) Caio Canedo (Senegal) Papa Waigo (Brazil) Marcus Vinícius	Al Wasl; Al Dhaid; Al Hamriyah	5
2018–19	(Brazil) Adeílson	Al Urooba	5
2019–20	(Brazil) Alex	Al Bataeh	7
2020–21	(Brazil) Diogo Acosta	Emirates	7
2021–22	(Brazil) Diogo Acosta	Dibba	8
2022–23	(Tunisia) Firas Ben Larbi (Brazil) Diogo Acosta	Ajman; Emirates	4
2023–24	(Morocco) Adel Taarabt	Al-Nasr	4
2024–25	(Brazil) Caio Lucas	Sharjah	4

=== All-time top scorers ===
Rank	Nat	Name	Club	Years	Goals	Apps
1	(United Arab Emirates)	Ahmed Abdullah	Al Ain	1978–1995		
2	(United Arab Emirates)	Adnan Al Talyani	Al Shaab	1980–1999		—N/a
3	(United Arab Emirates)	Abdelkarim Hassan			39	
4	(United Arab Emirates)	Fahad Khamees	Al Wasl	1980–1997	34	—N/a
5	(United Arab Emirates)	Khamees Saad Mubarak	Al Shabab		34	
6	(United Arab Emirates)	Eissa Jumaa	Al Nasr	1996-2005	33	
7	(United Arab Emirates)	Saad Bakheet Mubarak	Al Shabab		25	
