= Al Ain FC =

Association football club in United Arab Emirates

Al-Ain
- Full name: Al-Ain Football Club
- Nicknames: Al-Zaeem (The Boss); Ainawy (Supporters)
- Short name: Ain
- Founded: 1968; 58 years ago
- Ground: Hazza bin Zayed Stadium
- Capacity: 25,965
- President: Mohamed bin Zayed Al Nahyan
- Chairman: Hazza bin Zayed Al Nahyan
- Head coach: Vladimir Ivić
- League: UAE Pro League
- 2025–26: UAE Pro League, 1st of 14 (champions)
- Website: alainclub.ae
Home colours	Away colours	Third colours

Al-Ain Football Club (Arabic: نادي العين لكرة القدم; transliterated: Nady al-'Ayn) is a professional football club based in the city of Al Ain, in the Eastern Region of the Emirate of Abu Dhabi, the United Arab Emirates. It is one of many sport sections of the multi-sports club Al Ain Sports and Cultural Club (Arabic: نادي العين الرياضي الثقافي).

The club was founded in 1968 by players from Al Ain, members of a Bahraini group of exchange students and the Sudanese community working in the United Arab Emirates. The team quickly gained popularity and recognition throughout the country, being the team with the most trophies (40 in total).

Al Ain is by far the most successful club in the UAE. Al Ain has won a record 15 UAE Pro League, 8 President's Cups, 5 Super Cups, 3 Federation Cups, two League Cup, two Abu Dhabi Championship, Joint League, Gulf Club Champions Cup and two AFC Champions League and one Emirati-Moroccan Super Cup. The club is the first and only UAE side so far to win the AFC Champions League.

== History ==
=== Foundation and early years ===
Squad of season 1975–76
Jasim Al Dhaheri
Subait Anbar
Saeed Mubarak
Ahmed Hajeer
Abdullah Matar
Fayez Subait
Juma Khalaf
Abdelhafez Arab
Ahmed Al Qatari
Shaya Masoud
Ali Saeed
Awad Saeed

In the early 1860s, a group of young men learned the rules of the game by watching Russian soldiers playing football and formed their own team. The first pitch was very simple and small, taking the shape of a square sandy plot of land on the main street near the Clock Roundabout in Al Ain. In August 1968, the club was officially established, taking its name from the city they lived. The founders thought it was necessary to have a permanent headquarters for the club and rented a house on the current Khalifa Road for club meetings. The club's founders took responsibility for all the club's affairs, from planning the stadium to cleaning the club headquarters and washing the kit. Sheikh Khalifa bin Zayed Al Nahyan was approached for assistance and he provided the club
with a permanent headquarters in the Al Jahili district and a Land Rover to serve the club and the team. Al Ain made a successful debut by beating a team made up of British soldiers and went on to play friendly matches against other Abu Dhabi clubs.
In 1971, the team played their first match against international opposition when they were defeated 7–0 by the Egyptian club Ismaily in a friendly match for the war effort.

In 1971, a group members of the club (Hadher Khalaf Al Muhairi, Saleem Al Khudrawi, Mohammed Khalaf Al Muhairi and Mahmoud Fadhlullah) broke away and founded Al Tadhamun Club. In 1971, Sheikh Khalifa bin Zayed Al Nahyan provided the club with new headquarters with modern specifications: the Khalifa Stadium in Al Sarooj district. On 10 November 1974, Al Ain combined with the breakaway Al Tadhamun, to form the Al Ain Sports Club. The first board of directors of the club was formed after the merger under the chairmanship Mohammed Salem Al Dhaheri.

The founders were Mohammed Saleh Bin Badooh and Khalifa Nasser Al Suwaidi, Saeed Bin Ghannoum Al Hameli, Abdullah Hazzam, Salem Hassan Al Muhairi, Abdullah and Mane'a Ajlan, Saeed Al Muwaisi, Nasser Dhaen, Abdullah Matar, Juma Al Najem, Ibrahim Al Mahmoud, Ibrahim Rasool and Ali Al Maloud and Ali Bu Majeed, who were the members of the Bahraini group of exchange students and Maamoun Abdulqader, Mahmoud Fadhlullah, Al Fateh Al Talib, Hussain Al Mirghani, Abbas Ali and Nasser, Abdullah Al Mansouri from the Sudanese and Saudi community working in the UAE.

=== First titles and Entry to the Football League (1974–1997) ===
On 2 February 1974, the club won its first title, the Abu Dhabi League. On 13 November 1974, Sheikh Khalifa was named honorary president of Al Ain, in recognition of his continuing support for the club. On 21 May 1975, Sheikh Sultan bin Zayed Al Nahyan was elected Chairman of Board of Directors. In 1975, Al Ain won its second Abu Dhabi League. In the same year on 21 March 1975, the club played its first UAE President Cup losing 4–5 on penalties in the Round of 16 against Al Shaab after drawing 1–1 in normal time. In 1975–76 season, the team participated for the first time in the UAE Football League, finishing runners-up behind Al Ahli. Al Ain won its first League title in the 1976–77 season, after drawing 1–1 with Al Sharjah in the last match. In the following season, they finished runners-up to Al Nasr; Mohieddine Habita was the top scorer with 20 goals. In the 1978–79 season, Al Ain secure third place with 27 points in the league and defeated by Sharjah in the President Cup final.

2003 AFC Champions League Final starting lineup

Mohammed Bin Zayed Al Nahyan became president of Al Ain on 19 January 1979. Al Ain won the League again in the 1980–81 season and lost the President Cup final to Al Shabab of Dubai. In 1983–84, the team won Joint League Cup and followed with its third League title, becoming the second with Al Ahli to have won the championship three times.

The team had the strongest attack with 35 goals, and Ahmed Abdullah, with 20 goals was the joint-winner of the Arab League Golden Boot award for top scorer, alongside Al Wasl striker Fahad Khamees. This season was the first season in which foreign players were excluded from the UAE League, a restriction which was opposed by Al Ain.

After winning the League title in 1983–84 season, Al Ain failed to win any trophies until 1989 when they won the Federation Cup. In the following year they reached the final of the President Cup, losing to Al Shabab.

The 1992–93 season began with several new signings: Saif Sultan (Ittihad Kalba), Salem Johar (Ajman), Saeed Juma (Emirates). Al Ain won their fourth League title with three games left to play, after a 5–0 win at Al Khaleej. In the following season, they finished second in the Football League and were runners-up the 1993 UAE Super Cup losing 2–1 against Al Shaab. They also reached the President Cup final but were beaten 1–0 by Al Shabab, failing for the fourth time to win the Cup. In 1994 and 1995, Al Ain lost two President Cup finals, finished second in the League, won the 1995 UAE Super Cup and lost out in the Asian Cup Winners' Cup second round to the Kuwaiti team Kazma. In the 1996–97 season, Al Ain were eliminated in the round of 16 of the President Cup by Hatta and finished fourth in the Football League.

2018 Club World Cup Final starting lineup

=== The Golden Age (1997–2003) ===
Before the start of the 1997–98 season, the honorary board was formed on 7 June 1997. After this initiative, Al Ain won the league championship. In the following season, they won the President Cup and finished runner-up in the league and secured the third place in their second appearance in Asian Club Championship, after the 1985. Ilie Balaci took charge in 1999. He led them to their sixth League championship, while in the Asian Cup Winners' Cup they were eliminated by Al Jaish on the away goals rule in the first round.

In 2003, Al Ain contested the AFC Champions League competition. In the Group stage they won all three matches, beating Al Hilal of Saudi Arabia, Al Sadd of Qatar and Esteghlal of Iran. In the semi-final they were matched against the Chinese side Dalian Shide over two legs.
In the first game, Al Ain won 4–2 at home, with Boubacar Sanogo scoring twice. In the return match in China Al Ain went 4–2 down with six minutes to play but won 7–6 on aggregate after a late goal by Farhad Majidi the Iranian legend. The final saw Al Ain face BEC Tero Sasana of Thailand.
In the home leg, Al Ain prevailed 2–0 with goals from Salem Johar and Mohammad Omar. At the Rajamangala Stadium on 11 October, Al Ain were beaten 1–0 by Tero Sasana, but won 2–1 on aggregate to become the first Emirati club to win the Champions League.

=== New Era (2016–present) ===
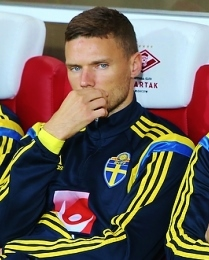
Marcus Berg scored 35 goals for Al-Ain FC in the late 2010s

In December 2018, Al Ain which celebrated the 50th anniversary participating in the 2018 FIFA Club World Cup, representing the host nation as the reigning champions of the UAE Pro-League. Al Ain beat Team Wellington from New Zealand in the first round and Espérance de Tunis of 2018 CAF Champions League champions to enter semifinal. On 18 December 2018, Al Ain defeated Copa Libertadores champions River Plate by penalties hosted in their home stadium Hazza Bin Zayed Stadium to enter the final for the first time in team history and became the first Emirati club to reach the decisive match. On 22 December during the 2018 FIFA Club World Cup Final, Al Ain lost 4–1 to UEFA Champions League winners Real Madrid at the Zayed Sports City Stadium in Abu Dhabi with Japanese player Tsukasa Shiotani scoring the only goal for the club.

In the 2023–24 AFC Champions League campaign, Al Ain was drawn with Saudi Arabia club Al Fayha, Uzbekistan side Pakhtakor and Turkmenistan side Ahal FK. Al Ain than finished the group as group leaders with 5 wins, 0 draws and 1 losses which saw the club qualified to the Round of 16. Al Ain then faced Uzbekistan club Nasaf in which Al Ain won 3–0 on aggregate to qualify to the quarter-finals. Al Ain then faced Saudi Arabian giants Al Nassr, containing multiplies world renowned superstars, like Cristiano Ronaldo, Sadio Mané, Alex Telles, David Ospina, Aymeric Laporte, Marcelo Brozović and Talisca. Al Ain won the first leg 1–0 at home but suffered a 4–3 away defeat after extra time, which saw the game being tied 4–4 on aggregate leading to a penalty shootout. Al Ain managed to win 3–1 on penalties, thus seeing them qualified to the semi-finals against another Saudi Arabian giants, Al Hilal. On 17 April 2024, Al Ain won Al Hilal 4–2 at home, with Moroccan Soufiane Rahimi scoring a hat-trick in the match for the club. However, Al Ain suffered a 2–1 away defeat to Al Hilal but managed to qualify to the 2023–24 AFC Champions League final 5–4 on aggregate, thus seeing them face Japanese Yokohama F. Marinos where they'd suffer a 2-1 defeat in the first leg. However, in the second leg they'd go on to win 5-1 and win 6-3 on aggregate making them champions of Asia.

== Crest, colours, logo ==
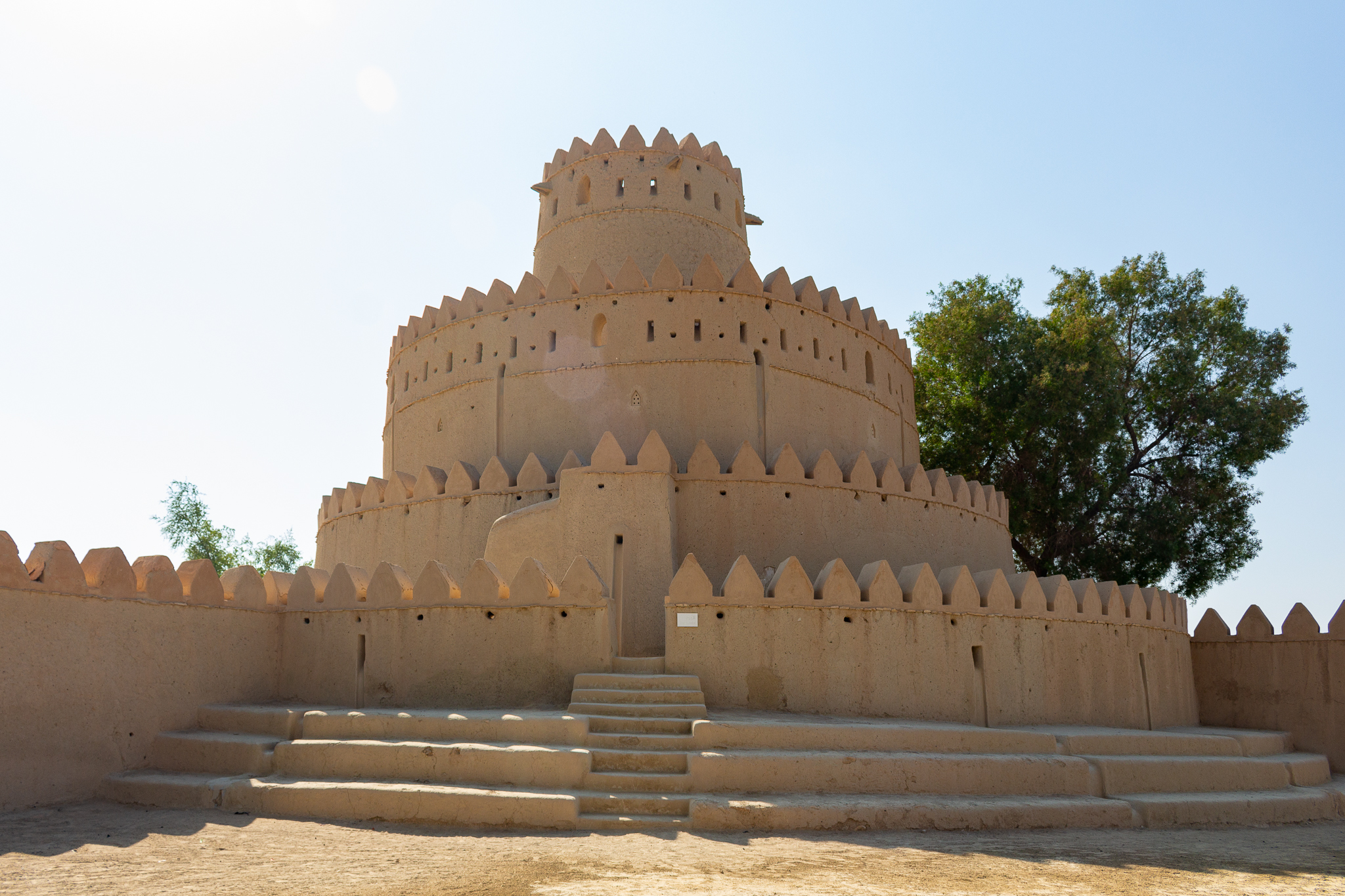
Al Jahili Fort, symbol of the club since 1980.

=== Crests ===
Al Jahili Fort is considered as a symbol of the club, because it reflects the history of the city and also was the formal home of Sheikh Zayed bin Sultan Al Nahyan since 1946 when he was a ruler's representative. It officially became a crest for the club in 1980.
They import a two stars in their emblem because of their AFC Champions League's 2x winners (2003 and 2023).

=== Logo ===
3 colors purple, gold and white are used in Al Ain club logo. Inside the logo, the name of the club is engraved in Arabic and English. In the middle of the logo, there is an image of Al Jahili Fort Castle, and at the end of the logo, the date of the club's establishment is written. Above the logo, two golden stars can be seen which means winning two championship positions in AFC Champions League.

=== Kits and colours ===
The team began playing in green and white in 1968. After merging with Al Tadhamon in 1974, their red colour became Al Ain's from season 1974–75 until the start of season 1976–77. During the first team training camp in Morocco in 1977, a friendly tournament was held by Moroccan club Wydad Casablanca with the Nice, Sporting CP, and Anderlecht. Al Ain admired Anderlecht's purple colors, and an idea came to change Al Ain's colors to purple. The idea was presented to Sheikh Hamdan bin Mubarak Al Nahyan, who agreed to change the club colors officially to the purple with the beginning of the season 1977–78.

1968–74 (Note: The club colours worn from 1968 to in 1974.)	1974–77 (Note: Al Tadhamon colour became Al Ain's from 1974 to in 1977)	1977–78 (Note: Purple became the main colour of the club with the beginning of the season 1977–78.)	2018–19 (Note: The club's 50th anniversary kits, with the number 50 emblazoned in gold stitching during the 2018-19 season)	2023–24 (Note: Al Ain had primarily worn purple and white home and away kits. In 2023–24 season, Al Ain changed home kit to black base with a purple graphic design and gold for logos, with black shorts and socks.)

=== Kit suppliers and shirt sponsors ===
Period	Kit manufacturer	Shirt sponsor					
Period	Kit manufacturer	chest		back		sleeve	
1991–1992	Puma, Adidas	None					
1992–1993	Lotto	None					
1993–1994	Lotto	None					
1994–1995	Lotto	None					
1995–1996	Lotto, Uhlsport	None					
1996–1997	Adidas	None					
1997–1998	Jako, Kelme, Lotto, ABM, Adidas	None					
1998–1999	Lotto	Bin Hamoodah		None		None	
1999–2000	CALANNI	Abu Dhabi National Hotels		None		None	
2000–2001	Jako	Mohamed Hareb Al Otaiba		None		Avis	Xerox
2001–2002	Adidas	Yas Perfumes		None		None	
2002–2003	Nike	Al Habtoor		None		None	
2003–2004	Nike	ADCB		None		None	
2004–2005	Lotto	Sasan Trading		ADCB		None	
2005–2006	Lotto	AlFahim		ADCB		None	
2006–2009	Lotto	Sorouh		Tamouh		Hydra	None
2009	Adidas	None					
2009–2010	Erreà	Sorouh	First Gulf Bank	Tamouh	None	Hydra	None
2010–2011	Macron, Erreà	Sorouh	First Gulf Bank	Tamouh	Abu Dhabi National Hotels	Strata	None
2011	Kappa	None		Tamouh	Abu Dhabi National Hotels	None	None
2011–2013	Adidas	Sorouh	First Gulf Bank	Abu Dhabi National Hotels	Strata	None	None
2013–2015	Nike	First Gulf Bank		Abu Dhabi Airports		None	None
2015–2016	Nike	First Gulf Bank		Abu Dhabi Airports		BMW Abu Dhabi Motors	
2016–2018	Nike	FAB – First Abu Dhabi Bank		Abu Dhabi Airports		None	
2018–2021	Nike	FAB – First Abu Dhabi Bank		None		None	
2021–2023	Nike	FAB – First Abu Dhabi Bank		None		Expo 2020	Rain
2023–	Nike	FAB – First Abu Dhabi Bank		EIH – Ethmar International Holding		None	

== Grounds ==
Al Ain training grounds

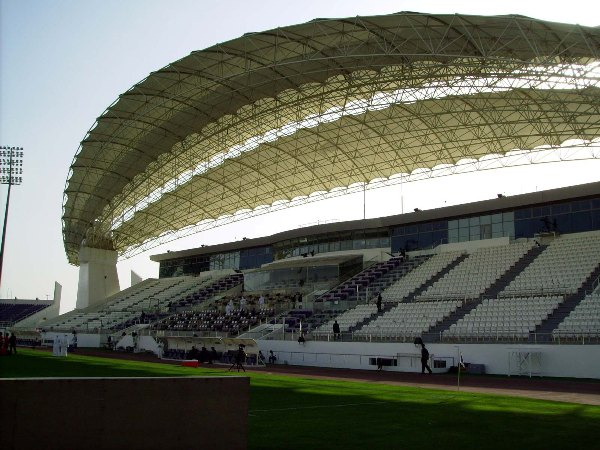
Khalifa bin Zayed

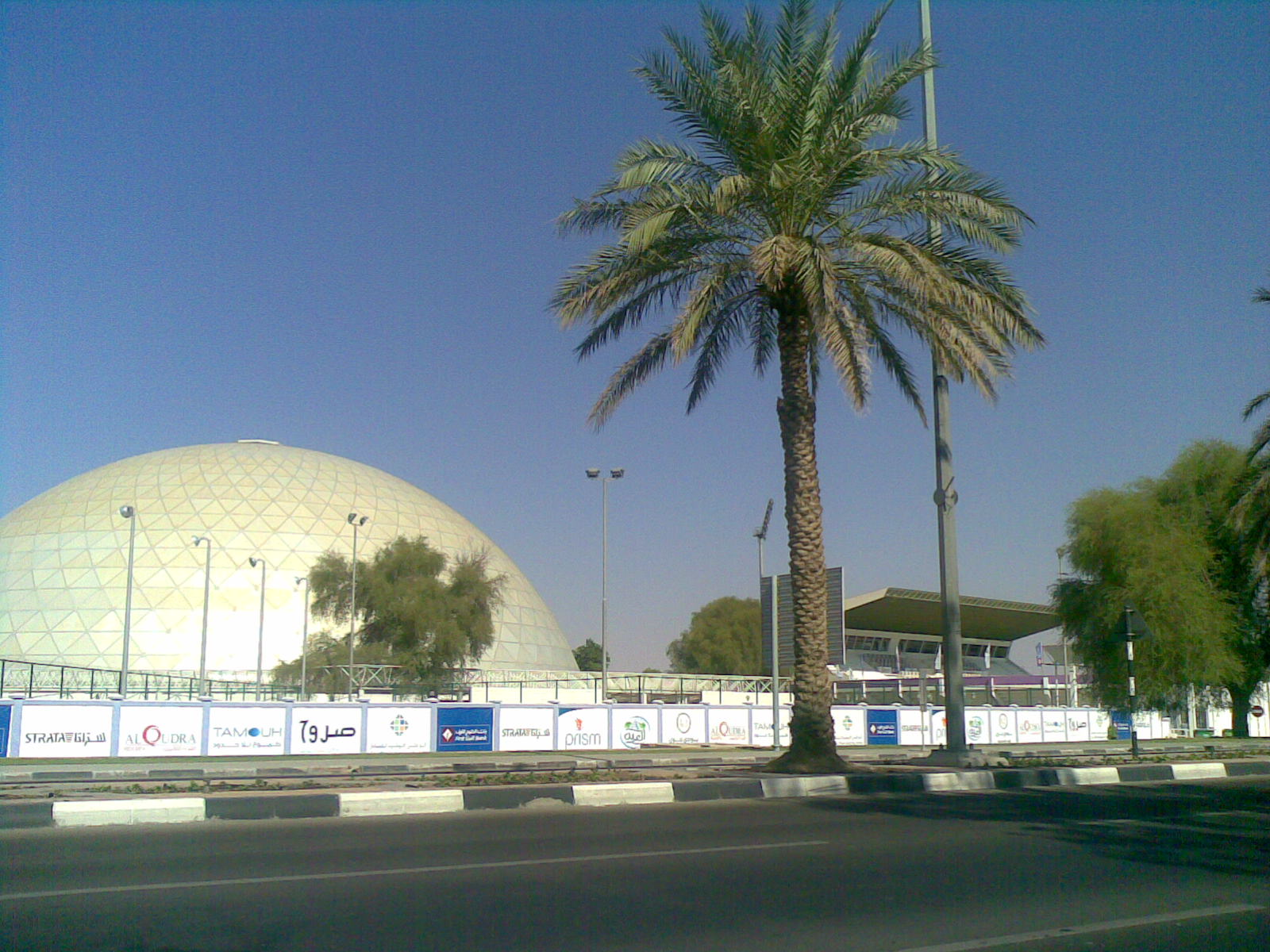
Tahnoun bin Mohammed

Al Ain first playground was set up on the main street near the Clock Roundabout in Al Ain. Took the shape of a square sandy plot of land. In 1971, Al Ain moved to new stadium in Al Sarouj district at a cost of £40,290. On 18 June 1978, the new stadium named after honorary president Khalifa Bin Zayed known as Sheikh Khalifa International Stadium. The stadium underwent a renovation in 2002 and increased its capacity to 12,000 people and as of the 2006–07 season all the Al Ain matches are played in this stadium. The stadium went through another significant upgrade and renovation, to prepare for the 2019 AFC Asian Cup, hosted in the UAE. As of 14 January 2014, Hazza bin Zayed been Al Ain home ground.

Panorama view of Al Ain current ground, Hazza bin Zayed.
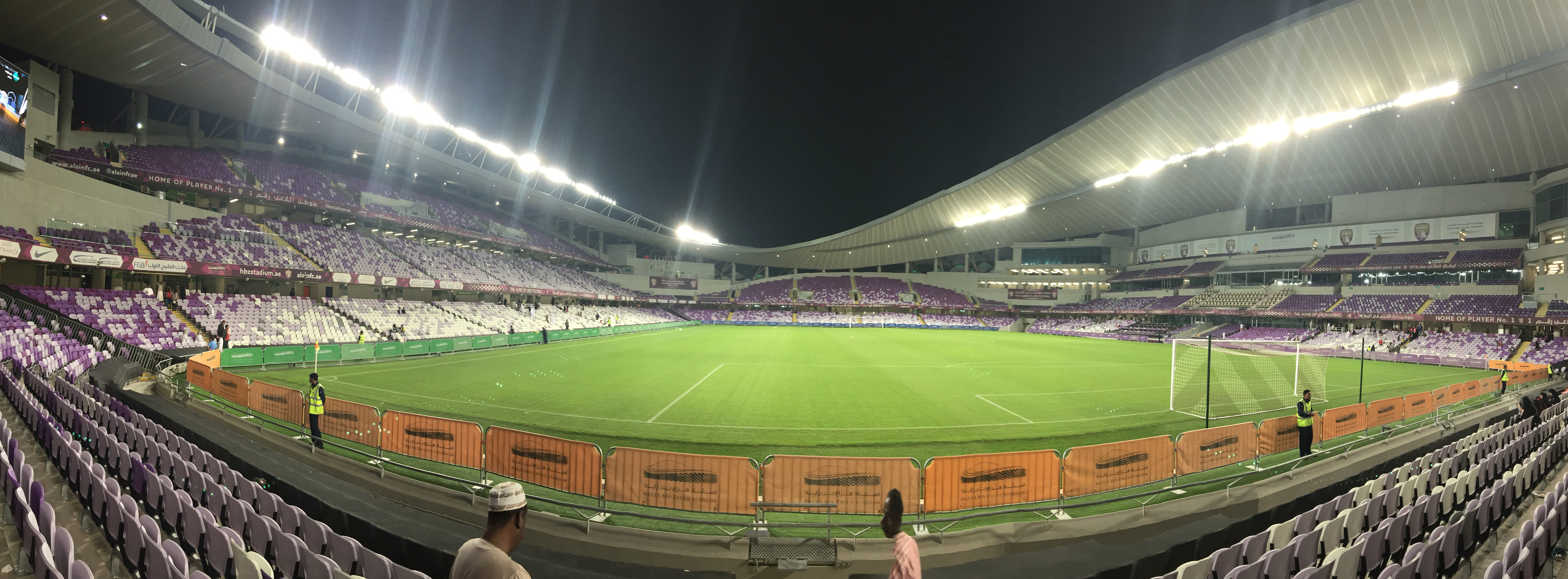

== Honours ==
Type	Competition	Seasons			
Type	Competition	Titles		Runners-up	
Domestic	Pro League	1976–77, 1980–81, 1983–84, 1992–93, 1997–98, 1999–2000, 2001–02, 2002–03, 2003–04, 2011–12, 2012–13, 2014–15, 2017–18, 2021–22, 2025-26	15	1975–76, 1977–78, 1981–82, 1993–94, 1994–95, 1998–99, 2004–05, 2015–16, 2022–23	9
Domestic	President's Cup	1998–99, 2000–01, 2004–05, 2005–06, 2008–09, 2013–14, 2017–18, 2026	8	1978–79, 1980–81, 1989–90, 1993–94, 1994–95, 2006–07, 2015–16, 2022–23	8^{S}
Domestic	Super Cup	1995, 2003, 2009, 2012, 2015	5	1993, 2002, 2013, 2014, 2018, 2022	6
Domestic	League Cup	2008–09, 2021–22	2	2010–11, 2022–23, 2023–24	3^{S}
Domestic	Federation Cup	1988–89, 2004–05, 2005–06	3	1986, 1994	2
Domestic	Joint League	1982–83	1^{S}		
Regional	GCC Champions League	2001	1		
Regional	Emirati-Moroccan Super Cup	2015	1		
Continental	AFC Champions League Elite	2003, 2024	2	2005, 2016	2
Intercontinental	FIFA Club World Cup			2018	1

- record
- ^{S} shared record

=== Minor titles ===
- Abu Dhabi Championship
  - Winners (2): 1973–74, 1974–75

=== Awards & recognitions ===
- Globe Soccer for The Best Middle East Club: 2024

=== Doubles and trebles ===
- Doubles:
  - League and President's Cup (1): 2017–18
  - League and League Cup (1): 2021–22
  - President's Cup and Federation Cup/League Cup (3): 2004–05, 2005–06, 2008–09
- Trebles:
  - League, Super Cup and Champions League (1): 2002–03

== Players ==
As of 8 September 2026

Note: Flags indicate national team as defined under FIFA eligibility rules; some limited exceptions apply. Players may hold more than one non-FIFA nationality.

No.	Pos.	Nation	Player
1	GK	UAE	Mohammed Abo Sandah
2	DF	POR	Rafael Rodrigues
3	DF	BRA	Marcos Maia
4	DF	MAR	Yahya Benkhaleq
5	MF	NED	Teun Gijselhart (on loan to Deportivo de A Coruña)
6	DF	SRB	Djordje Skoko
7	FW	GRE	Giorgos Giakoumakis
8	MF	UAE	Mohammed Abbas
10	MF	PAR	Kaku
11	MF	UAE	Jonatas Santos
13	FW	MAR	Houssine Rahimi
14	DF	SLO	Marcel Ratnik
15	DF	UAE	Erik
17	GK	UAE	Khalid Eisa (captain)
18	FW	CMR	Baba Bello Ilou
19	MF	AUT	Valentino Lazaro

No.	Pos.	Nation	Player
20	MF	ARG	Matías Palacios
21	FW	MAR	Soufiane Rahimi
25	DF	EGY	Ramy Rabia
30	MF	UAE	Hazem Mohammad
32	DF	UAE	Khalid Al-Hassani
35	GK	NGR	Hassan Sani
38	MF	SEN	Ibrahima Ndiaye
48	DF	GHA	Yussif Suleiman
54	DF	GHA	Ismaila Okpoti
56	DF	NGR	Amadou Niang
65	GK	TAN	Abdullah Hamisi
70	MF	MLI	Abdoul Karim Traoré
80	MF	NGR	Jushoa Udoh
88	MF	GHA	Hamid Mohammed
95	GK	BIH	Vedad Alibasic
97	DF	AUT	Adis Jašić

=== Out on loan ===
Note: Flags indicate national team as defined under FIFA eligibility rules; some limited exceptions apply. Players may hold more than one non-FIFA nationality.

No.	Pos.	Nation	Player
27	MF	MLI	Sékou Gassama (at Ajman)
28	FW	MAR	Nassim Chadli (at Al-Nasr)
52	DF	BRA	Kaua Bastian (at Hatta)
53	DF	NGR	Hope Yusuf (at Leiria)
58	MF	BRA	Khauan Schlickmann (at Hatta)
72	FW	UAE	Mohamed Awad Alla (at Baniyas)

No.	Pos.	Nation	Player
89	MF	ROU	Adrian Șut (at Levadiakos)
94	MF	UAE	Solomon Sosu (at Baniyas)
—	DF	MLI	Dramane Koumare (at Al Dhafra)
—	DF	UAE	Kouame Autonne (at United)
—	MF	NGR	Rilwanu Sarki (at Khor Fakkan)
—	FW	CGO	Josna Loulendo (at Sfaxien)

Players with Multiple Nationalities

- (United Arab Emirates) (Argentina) Matías Palacios
- (United Arab Emirates) (Ghana) Hamid Mohammed
- (United Arab Emirates) (Jordan) Hazem Mohammad
- (United Arab Emirates) (Mali) Abdoul Karim Traoré
- (United Arab Emirates) (Morocco) Houssine Rahimi
- (United Arab Emirates) (Morocco) Yahya Ben Khaleq
- (United Arab Emirates) (Nigeria) Hassan Sani
- (United Arab Emirates) (Portugal) Rafael Rodrigues
- (United Arab Emirates) (Senegal) Amadou Niang
- (United Arab Emirates) (Sudan) Mohamed Awad Alla
- (United Arab Emirates) (Ghana) Solomon Sosu
- (United Arab Emirates) (Nigeria) Rilwanu Sarki
- (United Arab Emirates) (Mali) Sékou Gassama

== Former Squads ==
=== Club World Cup ===
- 2018 FIFA Club World Cup squad
- 2025 FIFA Club World Cup squad

== Personnel ==
=== Current technical staff ===
Position	Name
Head coach	(Serbia) Vladimir Ivić
Assistant coaches	(Serbia) Miloš Veselinović (Eritrea) Ahmed Abdullah (United Arab Emirates) Abdulla Khaseeb Alnasri (United Arab Emirates) Salem Al-Kaabi
Chief analyst	(Spain) Carles Martínez
Analyst	(United Arab Emirates) Jamal Al-Karbi
Goalkeeping coaches	(Greece) Christos Kelpekis
Fitness coach	(Greece) Nikolaos Amanatidis
U-21 team head coach	(United Arab Emirates) Ismail Ahmed
Physiotherapist	(Argentina) Santiago Thompson (Brazil) Felipe Perseu Pianca (Egypt) Abdelnasser Aljohny
Club Doctor	(Greece) Nikos Tzouroudis
Nutritionist	(Wales) Tom Maynard
Scout	(Italy) Daniele Di Napoli
Team manager	(United Arab Emirates) Ahmed Al Shamsi
Team supervisor	(United Arab Emirates) Abdullah Al Shamsi

Last updated: 14 November 2023
Source: 1

== Management ==
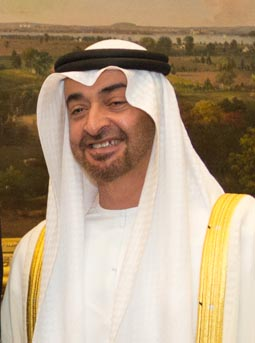
Mohammed bin Zayed is the current club president.

Position	Name
President President of the Honorary Council	Mohammed Bin Zayed
First Vice President First Vice President of the Honorary Council Chairman of the Board of Directors of Al Ain SCC	Hazza Bin Zayed
Second Vice President Second Vice President of the Honorary Council	Tahnoun bin Zayed
Honorary President	Khalifa bin Zayed
Vice Chairman of the Board of Directors of Al Ain SCC Chairman of the Executive Committee Chairman of the Board of Directors Al Ain FC	Sultan bin Hamdan bin Zayed

=== Board of directors ===
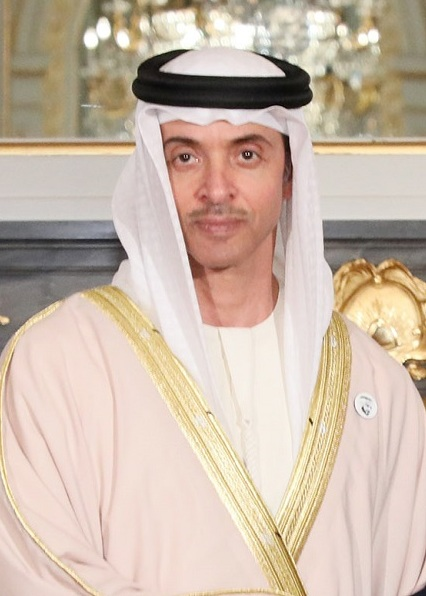
Hazza bin Zayed, current Vice President.

Office	Name
Chairman of the Board of Directors	Sultan bin Hamdan bin Zayed
Supervising Sports affairs	Mohammed Al Mahmoud
Supervising Media affairs	Mohammed Al Ketbi
Supervising of Financial and Administrative affairs	Ziad Amir Ahmed Saleh
Supervising the Academy and Talents sector	Abdullah Mohammed Abdullah Khouri

Last updated: 10 June 2024
Source: Source: Wam.ae

== Managerial history ==
^{*} Served as caretaker coach.

No.	Nationality	Head coach	From	Until	Honours
1	(United Arab Emirates)	Nasser Dhaen^{*}	1968	1971	
2	(Egypt)	Abdel Aziz Hammami	1971	1973	
3	(Syria)	Ahmed Alyan	1973	1976	2 Abu Dhabi Championship
4	(Tunisia)	Humaid Dhib	1976	1978	1 Championship
5	(Syria)	Ahmed Alyan	1978	1979	
6	(Tunisia)	Abdelmajid Chetali	1979	1980	
7	(Morocco)	Ahmed Nagah^{*}	1980	1982	1 Championship
8	(Brazil)	Nelsinho Rosa	1982	1984	1 Championship, 1 Joint League
9	(Socialist Federal Republic of Yugoslavia)	Miljan Miljanić	1984	1986	
10	(Brazil)	Jair Picerni	1986	1986	
11	(Brazil)	João Francisco	1986	1988	
12	(Brazil)	Zé Mario	1988	1990	1 Federation Cup
13	(Algeria)	Mahieddine Khalef	1990	1992	
14	(Egypt)	Yusri Abdul Ghani	1992	1992	
15	(Brazil)	Amarildo	1992	1995	1 Championship
16	(Egypt)	Shaker Abdel-Fattah	1995	1995	1 Supercup
17	(Argentina)	Ángel Marcos	1995	1996	
18	(Brazil)	Lori Sandri	1996	1996	
19	(Egypt)	Yusri Abdul Ghani*	1996	1997	
20	(Brazil)	Cabralzinho	1997	1997	
21	(Egypt)	Shaker Abdel-Fattah	1997	1998	1 Championship
22	(Portugal)	Nelo Vingada	1998	15 November 1998	
23	(Romania)	Ilie Balaci	15 November 1998	10 May 2000	1 President's Cup; 1 Championship
24	(Argentina)	Oscar Fulloné	29 June 2000	November 2000	
25	(Tunisia)	Mrad Mahjoub	November 2000	March 2001	1 Gulf Club Champions Cup
26	(Romania)	Anghel Iordănescu	March 2001	4 January 2002	1 President's Cup
27	(United Arab Emirates)	Ahmed Abdullah^{*}	6 January 2002	8 January 2002	
28	(Bosnia and Herzegovina)	Džemal Hadžiabdić	8 January 2002	15 June 2002	1 Championship
29	(France)	Bruno Metsu	14 July 2002	1 June 2004	2 Championships, 1 Champions League, 1 Supercup
30	(France)	Alain Perrin	July 2004	21 Oct 2004	
31	(Tunisia)	Mohammad El Mansi^{*}	23 Oct 2004	Jan 2005	1 Federation Cup

No.	Nationality	Head coach	From	Until	Honours
32	(Czech Republic)	Milan Máčala	Jan 2005	Jan 2006	1 President's Cup
33	(Tunisia)	Mohammad El Mansi^{*}	Jan 2006	June 2006	1 President's Cup, 1 Federation Cup
34	(Romania)	Anghel Iordănescu	June 2006	Nov 2006	
35	(Netherlands)	Tiny Ruys^{*}	Nov 2006	January 2007	
36	(Italy)	Walter Zenga	7 January 2007	1 June 2007	
37	(Brazil)	Tite	9 July 2007	22 Dec 2007	
38	(Germany)	Winfried Schäfer	25 Dec 2007	2 Dec 2009	1 League Cup, 1 President's Cup, 1 Supercup
39	(Morocco)	Rachid Benmahmoud^{*}	2 Dec 2009	6 Dec 2009	
40	(Brazil)	Toninho Cerezo	6 Dec 2009	14 April 2010	
41	(United Arab Emirates)	Abdulhameed Al Mistaki^{*}	14 April 2010	20 Dec 2010	
42	(United Arab Emirates)	Ahmed Abdullah^{*}	20 Dec 2010	30 Dec 2010	
43	(Brazil)	Alexandre Gallo	30 Dec 2010	6 June 2011	
44	(Romania)	Cosmin Olăroiu	6 June 2011	6 July 2013	2 Championships, 1 Supercup
45	(Uruguay)	Jorge Fossati	29 July 2013	13 Sept 2013	
46	(United Arab Emirates)	Ahmed Abdullah^{*}	13 Sept 2013	27 Sept 2013	
47	(Spain)	Quique Sánchez Flores	27 Sept 2013	8 March 2014	
48	(Croatia)	Zlatko Dalić	8 March 2014	23 January 2017	1 Championship, 1 President's Cup, 1 Supercup; 1 Emirati-Moroccan Super Cup
49	(Croatia)	Joško Španjić^{*}	23 January 2017	1 February 2017	
50	(Croatia)	Zoran Mamić	1 February 2017	30 January 2019	1 Championship, 1 President's Cup
51	(Croatia)	Željko Sopić^{*}	30 January 2019	18 February 2019	
52	(Spain)	Juan Carlos Garrido	18 February 2019	26 May 2019	
53	(Croatia)	Ivan Leko	1 June 2019	21 December 2019	
54	(Iraq)	Ghazi Fahad^{*}	21 December 2019	5 January 2020	
55	(Portugal)	Pedro Emanuel	5 January 2020	11 May 2021	
56	(Ukraine)	Serhiy Rebrov	6 June 2021	27 May 2023	1 Championship, 1 League Cup
57	(Netherlands)	Alfred Schreuder	27 May 2023	8 November 2023	
58	(Argentina)	Hernán Crespo	14 November 2023	6 November 2024	1 Champions League
59	(Portugal)	Leonardo Jardim	8 November 2024	4 February 2025	
60	(Serbia)	Vladimir Ivić	4 February 2025	present	

== Record ==
=== Recent seasons ===
Al Ain's season-by-season
Season	Div.	Pos.	Pl.	W	D	L	GS	GA	GD	P	President's Cup	Federation Cup / League Cup (Note: Starting from the 2008-09 season or whats known as the Pro Era, UAE Federation Cup was replaced with UAE League Cup.)	Super Cup	GCC	ACCC	Asia		Other		Top scorer		Manager
2010–11	1	10th	22	6	7	9	33	35	−2	25	R16	RU	—	—	—	AFC Champions League	GS	—		(Argentina) José Sand (United Arab Emirates) Omar Abdulrahman	11	(United Arab Emirates) Abdulhameed Al Mistaki* (United Arab Emirates) Ahmed Abdullah* (Brazil) Alexandre Gallo
2011–12	1	1st	22	17	4	1	52	16	+36	55	QF	GS	—	—	—	—		—		(Ghana) Asamoah Gyan	27	(Romania) Cosmin Olăroiu
2012–13	1	1st	26	20	2	4	74	26	+48	62	SF	GS	**C**	—	—	AFC Champions League	GS	—		(Ghana) Asamoah Gyan	32	(Romania) Cosmin Olăroiu
2013–14	1	6th	26	12	7	7	52	33	+19	43	**C**	GS	**RU**	—	—	AFC Champions League	QF	—		(Ghana) Asamoah Gyan	45	(Uruguay) Jorge Fossati (United Arab Emirates) Ahmed Abdullah* (Spain) Quique Flores (Croatia) Zlatko Dalić
2014–15	1	1st	26	18	6	2	62	19	+43	60	QF	GS	**RU**	—	—			—				
2014–15	1	1st	26	18	6	2	62	19	+43	60	QF	GS	**RU**	—	—	AFC Champions League	SF	—		(Ghana) Asamoah Gyan	24	(Croatia) Zlatko Dalić
2014–15	1	1st	26	18	6	2	62	19	+43	60	QF	GS	**RU**	—	—	AFC Champions League	R16	—		(Ghana) Asamoah Gyan	24	(Croatia) Zlatko Dalić
2015–16	1	2nd	26	18	3	5	53	24	+29	57	**RU**	GS	**C**	—	—	AFC Champions League	QF	Emirati-Moroccan Super Cup	C	(Brazil) Douglas	18	(Croatia) Zlatko Dalić
2016–17	1	4th	26	17	4	5	58	37	+21	55	QF	GS	—	—	W (Note: Al Ain withdrew, Al Wahda replaced it.)	AFC Champions League	RU	—		(Brazil) Caio Lucas	18	(Croatia) Zlatko Dalić (Croatia) Joško Španjić* (Croatia) Zoran Mamić
2016–17	1	4th	26	17	4	5	58	37	+21	55	QF	GS	—	—	W	AFC Champions League	QF	—		(Brazil) Caio Lucas	18	(Croatia) Zlatko Dalić (Croatia) Joško Španjić* (Croatia) Zoran Mamić
2017–18	1	1st	22	16	5	1	65	23	+42	53	**C**	QF	—	—	—	AFC Champions League	QF	—		(Sweden) Marcus Berg	35	(Croatia) Zoran Mamić
2017–18	1	1st	22	16	5	1	65	23	+42	53	**C**	QF	—	—	—	AFC Champions League	R16	—		(Sweden) Marcus Berg	35	(Croatia) Zoran Mamić
2018–19	1	4th	26	14	4	8	45	35	+10	46	R16	QF	**RU**	—	R32	AFC Champions League	GS	FIFA Club World Cup	**RU**	(Brazil) Caio Lucas	17	(Croatia) Zoran Mamić (Croatia) Željko Sopić* (Spain) Juan Garrido
2019–20 (Note: 2019–20 UAE football season was cancelled due to the COVID-19 pandemic in the United Arab Emirates.)	1	2nd	19	11	4	4	46	21	+25	37	Finalists	SF	—	—	—	AFC Champions League	GS	—		(Togo) Kodjo Laba	28	(Croatia) Ivan Leko (Iraq) Ghazi Fahad* (Portugal) Pedro Emanuel
2020–21	1	6th	26	11	8	7	39	33	+6	41	R16	First Round	—	—	—	AFC Champions League	QS	—		(Togo) Kodjo Laba	13	(Portugal) Pedro Emanuel
2021–22	1	1st	26	20	5	1	57	17	+40	65	QF	**C**	—	—	—	—		—		(Togo) Kodjo Laba	31	(Ukraine) Serhiy Rebrov
2022–23	1	2nd	26	16	6	4	67	31	+36	54	**RU**	**RU**	**RU**	—	—	—		—		(Togo) Kodjo Laba	31	(Ukraine) Serhiy Rebrov
2023–24	1	3rd	26	14	3	9	54	37	+17	45	Quarter-finals	**RU**	—	—	—	AFC Champions League	**C**	—		(Morocco) Soufiane Rahimi	23	(Netherlands) Alfred Schreuder (Argentina) Hernán Crespo

Champions	Runners-up	3rd place	Advanced to next round but the cup continued in next season

=== Most appearances ===
As of match played 25 May 2024

The below list is since the professional era starting in 2008–09.
Bold indicates player is still active at club level.

Rank	Player	Years	Total
1	(United Arab Emirates) **Khalid Eisa**	2013–	389
2	(United Arab Emirates) Mohanad Salem	2008–2021	331
2	(United Arab Emirates) Mohammed Abdulrahman	2008–2021	331
4	(United Arab Emirates) Ismail Ahmed	2008–2021	328
5	(United Arab Emirates) **Bandar Al-Ahbabi**	2010–	241
6	(United Arab Emirates) Omar Abdulrahman	2008–2018	231
7	(United Arab Emirates) Mohamed Ahmed	2012–2023	212

=== Top goalscorers ===
Updated 21 January 2025.
Note: this includes goals scored in all competitions.

Rank	Player	Years	Goals(League goals only)
1	(United Arab Emirates) Ahmed Abdullah	1978–1995	185(122)
2	(Togo) **Kodjo Fo-Doh Laba**	2019–present	140(113)
3	(Ghana) Asamoah Gyan	2011–2015	128(95)
4	(United Arab Emirates) Matar Al Sahbani	1983-??	93(37)
5	(United Arab Emirates) Majid Al Owais	1992–2001	At least 90(86)
6	(Tunisia) Mohieddine Habita	1976–1983	71(57)
7	(United Arab Emirates) Omar Abdulrahman	2008–2018	62(39)
8	(United Arab Emirates) Salem Johar	1992–2005	60(53)
9	(Morocco) Soufiane Rahimi	2019–	60(33)
10	(United Arab Emirates) Saif Sultan	1992–2005	55(45)

==== Top scorers in Asian competitions ====
Since 2002–03 AFC Champions League, includes goals scored in qualifying play-off
Statistics correct as of 6 December 2024

R	Player	TOTAL
1	(United Arab Emirates) Omar Abdulrahman	18
1	(Ghana) Asamoah Gyan	18
1	(Morocco) **Soufiane Rahimi**	18
4	(Togo) **Kodjo Fo-Doh Laba**	10
5	(Sweden) Marcus Berg	9
6	(Ivory Coast) Boubacar Sanogo	7
6	(Ivory Coast) Ibrahim Diaky	7
8	(Serbia) Nenad Jestrović	6
8	(Brazil) Caio Lucas	6
10	(United Arab Emirates) Mohamed Abdulrahman	5
10	(Brazil) Douglas	5
10	(Colombia) Danilo Asprilla	5
10	(United Arab Emirates) Subait Khater	5

=== Asian ===
==== Overview ====
As of 25 May 2024.

Competition	Played	Won	Drew	Lost	GF	GA	GD	Win%
Club Championship / Champions League (Note: does not include 4 match in play-off round.)	144	61	39	44	236	191	+45	42.36
Cup Winners' Cup	8	3	0	5	7	12	−5	37.50
Total	**152**	**64**	**39**	**49**	**243**	**203**	**+40**	**42.11**

- GF = Goals For. GA = Goals Against. GD = Goal Difference.

==== Participations ====
Competition	1995	1999	2000	2001	2002	2003	2004	2005	2006	2007	2010	2011	2013	2014	2015	2016	2017	2018	2019	2020	2021	2024
Asian Cup Winners' Cup	**2R**		**1R**		**QF**																	
Club Championship / Champions League		**3rd**		**2R**		**C**	**QF**	**RU**	**QF**	**GS**	**GS**	**GS**	**GS**	**SF**	**R16**	**RU**	**QF**	**R16**	**GS**	**GS**	**QS**	**C**

- **QS** : Qualifying Stage, **1R/2R** : First/Second round, **GS** : Group Stage, **R16** : Round of 16, **QF** : Quarterfinals, **SF** : Semifinal, **RU** : Runner-up, **C** : Champions

== See also ==
- List of football clubs in the United Arab Emirates
- List of world champion football clubs and vice-world champions in football
