= 2021–22 UAE Division 1 =

UAE Division One
- Season: 2021–22
- Dates: 8 October 2021 – 29 April 2022
- Champions: Dibba Al Fujairah (2nd title)
- Promoted: Dibba Al Fujairah; Al Bataeh
- Matches played: 112
- Goals scored: 347 (3.1 per match)
- Top goalscorer: Diogo Acosta (27 goals)
- Biggest home win: Dibba Al Fujairah 5–0 Al Jazirah Al Hamra (18 December 2021)
- Biggest away win: Abtal Al Khaleej 2–8 Dibba Al Fujairah (10 December 2021)
- Highest scoring: Abtal Al Khaleej 2–8 Dibba Al Fujairah (10 December 2021)
- Longest winning run: Dibba Al Fujairah (13 games)
- Longest unbeaten run: Al Arabi (12 games)
- Longest winless run: Dubai City (14 games)
- Longest losing run: Abtal Al Khaleej (6 games)
- All statistics correct as of 30 April 2022.

2021–22 UAE Division One is the 45th Division one season. This seasons will expand the league from 11 to 15 teams due to the inclusion of UAE Second Division League teams who were recently promoted into the league.

== Team changes ==
=== To Division 1 ===
Relegated from UAE Pro League

- Fujairah
- Hatta

Promoted from UAE Division 2

- Abtal Al Khaleej
- Dubai City

Joined

- Al Rams
- Al Jazirah Al Hamra

=== From Division 1 ===
Promoted to UAE Pro League

- Al Urooba
- Emirates

== Stadia and locations ==
Locations of teams in the UAE Division One

Note: Table lists clubs in alphabetical order.

Club	Home city	Stadium	Capacity
Abtal Al Khaleej	Dubai (Mirdif)	Khalid bin Mohammed Stadium	12,000
Al Arabi	Umm al Quwain	Umm al Quwain Stadium	3,000
Al Bataeh	Al Bataeh	Al Bataeh Stadium	2,000
Al Hamriyah	Al Hamriyah	Al Hamriya Sports Club Stadium	5,000
Al Jazirah Al Hamra	Al Jazirah Al Hamra	Al Hamra Stadium	2,000
Al Rams	Ar-Rams	Al Rams Stadium	4,000
Al Taawon	Al Jeer	Taawon Stadium	200
Dibba Al Fujairah	Dibba Al-Fujairah	Dibba (F) Stadium	100
Dibba Al Hisn	Dibba Al-Hisn	Dibba (H) Stadium	700
Hatta	Hatta	Hamdan Bin Rashid Stadium	5,000
Dhaid	Dhaid	Al-Dhaid Stadium	500
Dubai City	Dubai (Al Barsha)	The Sevens Stadium	4,000
Fujairah	Fujairah	Fujairah Club Stadium	10,645
Masafi	Masafi	Masafi Stadium	2,000
Masfout	Masfout	Masfout Club Stadium	3,000

== Personnel and kits ==
Note: Flags indicate national team as has been defined under FIFA eligibility rules. Players may hold more than one non-FIFA nationality.

Team	Head Coach	Captain	Kit Manufacturer	Shirt Sponsor
Abtal Al Khaleej	(United Arab Emirates) Mostafa Abdelhady	(Nigeria) Damilare Adigun	uhlsport	
Al Arabi	(United Arab Emirates) Mohammad Al Jalboot	(United Arab Emirates) Khalifa Abdullah	Nike	
Al Bataeh	(Tunisia) Tarek Hadhiri	(Brazil) Rodrigo Souza	uhlsport	SMC
Al Dhaid	(Czech Republic) Roman Nádvorník	(United Arab Emirates) Ali Al-Nuaimi	uhlsport	
Al Hamriyah	(United Arab Emirates) Jamal Al Hassani	(United Arab Emirates) Ahmed Al-Shaji	Nike	
Al Jazirah Al Hamra	(United Arab Emirates) Mutaz Abdulla	(United Arab Emirates) Salem Al Khaddem	uhlsport	
Al Rams	(United Arab Emirates) Salem Al-Bout	(United Arab Emirates) Ali Al Maazmi	uhlsport	
Al Taawon	(Morocco) Ahmed El Mujahid	(United Arab Emirates) Malek Al-Shehhi	uhlsport	
Dibba Al Fujairah	(Serbia) Zoran Popović	(United Arab Emirates) Mohamed Al Rowaihy	uhlsport	
Dibba Al Hisn	(Morocco) Saeed Shakhit	(United Arab Emirates) Khalid Al Riyami	uhlsport	
Dubai City	(England) Mason Mcclelland	(England) Jamal Bartley	Macron	
Fujairah	(United Arab Emirates) Mohammed Al-Timoumi	(United Arab Emirates) Ahmed Al-Zahmi	Puma	
Hatta	(Tunisia) Ameur Derbal	(United Arab Emirates) Lahej Al-Nofali	Macron	Expo
Masafi	(United Arab Emirates) Fahad Al Dabal	(Ivory Coast) Brahima Diakite	Adidas	
Masfout	(United Arab Emirates) Abdulghani Binkarshat	(United Arab Emirates) Abdullah Jassem	Nike	

=== Foreign players ===
All teams could register as many foreign players as they want, but could only use two on the field each game.

- Players name in **bold** indicates the player is registered during the mid-season transfer window.
- Players in italics were out of the squad or left the club within the season, after the pre-season transfer window, or in the mid-season transfer window, and at least had one appearance.

Club	Player 1	Player 2	Former Players
Abtal Al Khaleej	(Nigeria) Damilare Adigun	(Senegal) Lassana Camara	
Al Arabi	(Brazil) Alex	(Brazil) Paulinho	
Al Bataeh	(Brazil) Rodrigo Souza	(Bahrain) Thiago Augusto	(Brazil) Thauan
Al Dhaid	(Brazil) Adenilson		(Brazil) Sílvio Júnior
Al Hamriyah	(Brazil) Gilmar	(Brazil) Vinícius Lopes	
Al Jazirah Al Hamra	(Mexico) Hugo Alexsander	(Ivory Coast) Kouakou Kouadio	
Al Rams	(Brazil) **Saullo**	(Brazil) Valdo Babacal	(Brazil) Geovane
Al Taawon	(Brazil) Gil Paraíba	(Ghana) Denny Antwi	
Dibba Al Fujairah	(Brazil) Diogo Acosta	(Brazil) Chiquinho	
Dibba Al Hisn	(Brazil) Dedê Costa	(Brazil) Marcos Moraes	
Dubai City	(England) Jamal Bartley	(Zambia) Nenai Banda	
Fujairah	(Ghana) Issah Yakubu	(Iraq) Mustafa Mahmoud	
Hatta	(Brazil) Régis	(Brazil) **Tony**	(Brazil) Hyuri
Masafi	(Brazil) **Sílvio Júnior**	(Ivory Coast) Brahima Diakite	(Brazil) Fidélis
Masfout	(Brazil) Jacó	(Brazil) **Juan Batista**	(Brazil) Bruno Dybal

=== Managerial changes ===
Team	Outgoing manager	Date of vacancy	Manner of departure	Pos.	Incoming manager	Date of appointment
Hatta	(Serbia) Vladimir Vermezović	25 April 2021	Sacked	Pre-season	(United Arab Emirates) Sulaiman Al Balooshi	30 May 2021
Al Bataeh	(United Arab Emirates) Abdullah Mesfer	1 May 2021	Resigned	Pre-season	(Tunisia) Tarek Hadhiri	20 May 2021
Fujairah	(Tunisia) Nassif Al Bayawi	15 May 2021	Resigned	Pre-season	(United Arab Emirates) Mohammed Al-Timoumi	16 May 2021
Masfout	(Tunisia) Tarek Hadhiri	20 May 2021	Signed by Al Bataeh	Pre-season	(United Arab Emirates) Abdulghani Binkarshat	21 May 2021
Dibba Al Fujairah	(United Arab Emirates) Sulaiman Al Balooshi	30 May 2021	Signed by Hatta	Pre-season	(Serbia) Zoran Popović	1 July 2021
Dibba Al Hisn	(United Arab Emirates) Abdulghani Binkarshat	1 June 2021	End of contract	Pre-season	(Tunisia) Othmen Najjar	3 July 2021
Al Jazirah Al Hamra	(United Arab Emirates) Ali Al Shehhi	11 October 2021	Mutual consent	13th	(United Arab Emirates) Muhammad Al-Naqbi	11 October 2021
Hatta	(United Arab Emirates) Sulaiman Al Balooshi	1 November 2021	Sacked	10th	(Algeria) Fouad Boumdal	1 November 2021
Al Rams	(United Arab Emirates) Jassim Al Tunaiji	16 November 2021	Resigned	12th	(United Arab Emirates) Salem Al-Bout	16 November 2021
Al Jazirah Al Hamra	(United Arab Emirates) Muhammad Al-Naqbi	17 November 2021	End of caretaker spell	14th	(United Arab Emirates) Mutaz Abdulla	17 November 2021
Abtal Al Khaleej	(United Arab Emirates) Mostafa Abdelhady	20 November 2021	Sacked	10th	(Morocco) Ahmed El Mujahid	25 November 2021
Abtal Al Khaleej	(Morocco) Ahmed El Mujahid	12 December 2021	Resigned	11th	(United Arab Emirates) Mostafa Abdelhady	13 December 2021
Al Taawon	(United Arab Emirates) Aaref Al Shehhi	14 December 2021	Sacked	13th	(Morocco) Ahmed El Mujahid	14 December 2021
Masafi	(United Arab Emirates) Mohamed Al Antali	15 December 2021	Mutual consent	14th	(United Arab Emirates) Fahad Al Dabal	15 December 2021
Al Dhaid	(United Arab Emirates) Walid Obaid	29 December 2021	Mutual consent	10th	(Czech Republic) Roman Nádvorník	5 January 2022
Dibba Al Hisn	(Tunisia) Othmen Najjar	3 January 2022	Sacked	4th	(Morocco) Saeed Shakhit	8 January 2022
Hatta	(Algeria) Fouad Boumdal	7 January 2022	Resigned	6th	(Tunisia) Amer Derbal	7 January 2022
Al Hamriyah	(Egypt) Tareq Al Sayed	14 February 2022	Resigned	4th	(United Arab Emirates) Jamal Al Hassani	15 January 2022

== League table ==
Pos	Team	Pld	W	D	L	GF	GA	GD	Pts	Promotion
1	Dibba Al Fujairah (C, P)	28	24	3	1	73	15	+58	75	Promotion to the UAE Pro League
2	Al Bataeh (P)	28	21	4	3	58	21	+37	67	Promotion to the UAE Pro League
3	Dibba Al Hisn	28	19	6	3	56	26	+30	63	
4	Al Arabi	28	20	3	5	48	24	+24	63	
5	Al Hamriyah	28	15	7	6	56	34	+22	52	
6	Hatta	28	14	5	9	44	38	+6	47	
7	Fujairah	28	12	7	9	38	32	+6	43	
8	Masfout	28	10	5	13	34	38	−4	35	
9	Al Jazirah Al Hamra	28	8	6	14	41	57	−16	30	
10	Masafi	28	8	3	17	30	42	−12	27	
11	Abtal Al Khaleej	28	6	6	16	39	64	−25	24	
12	Al Rams	28	6	2	20	29	65	−36	20	
13	Al Taawon	28	5	4	19	32	52	−20	19	
14	Al Dhaid	28	5	4	19	28	52	−24	19	
15	Dubai City	28	3	3	22	26	72	−46	12	

Source: soccerway
Rules for classification: 1) points; 2) head-to-head points; 3) goal difference; 4) number of goals scored.
(C) Champions; (P) Promoted

== Results ==
Home \ Away	ABK	ARB	BTH	DHD	HAM	JHR	RAM	TAW	DAF	DAH	DCI	FUJ	HAT	MSF	MST
Abtal Al Khaleej		0–1	1–1	3–2	2–2	1–1	0–1	2–2	2–8	1–3	3–1	0–0	0–2	1–0	1–4
Al Arabi	4–1		1–0	2–0	1–1	2–1	1–0	2–0	0–2	0–0	2–1	2–1	1–2	2–1	1–0
Al Bataeh	4–2	2–0		1–0	4–2	3–1	4–1	4–1	1–0	1–2	3–1	2–0	0–1	1–0	4–1
Al Dhaid	2–2	0–0	0–2		2–3	2–3	3–1	1–3	0–1	0–2	0–1	1–2	2–1	1–1	1–2
Al Hamriyah	3–1	1–2	1–1	4–0		1–2	2–0	3–0	0–2	2–3	2–0	1–0	4–4	4–1	0–0
Al Jazirah Al Hamra	1–3	1–2	1–5	1–2	1–2		2–1	2–1	0–0	0–1	4–3	0–0	1–2	2–3	2–2
Al Rams	4–0	1–2	1–3	1–1	0–1	3–4		1–0	1–4	0–4	2–1	0–5	1–2	2–1	2–4
Al Taawon	2–0	0–2	0–1	0–1	1–3	2–3	2–1		1–3	0–2	3–1	1–2	2–2	3–1	1–2
Dibba Al Fujairah	5–2	2–1	1–1	3–0	4–1	6–0	5–0	1–0		2–0	5–1	3–0	3–0	1–0	2–1
Dibba Al Hisn	4–3	2–1	1–2	3–0	2–2	1–1	5–0	3–2	1–1		4–0	1–1	2–3	1–0	2–1
Dubai City	0–3	1–6	0–1	0–3	0–5	1–1	2–0	2–2	1–2	0–1		1–2	1–2	0–2	1–2
Fujairah	3–2	1–2	0–0	2–1	1–1	2–1	2–0	1–1	0–2	1–2	5–2		1–0	1–2	1–1
Hatta	2–1	0–2	1–3	4–2	0–2	2–1	1–1	2–0	1–2	1–2	5–1	1–0		0–1	1–1
Masafi	2–0	1–3	1–2	3–1	0–2	2–1	3–4	2–1	0–2	1–1	1–2	1–2	0–0		1–0
Masfout	0–2	2–3	0–2	1–0	0–1	3–2	1–0	2–1	0–1	0–1	1–1	1–2	1–2	1–0	

Source: soccerway
Legend: Blue = home team win; Yellow = draw; Red = away team win.
For upcoming matches, an "a" indicates there is an article about the rivalry between the two participants.

== Season statistics ==
=== Top scorers ===
Rank	Player	Club	Goals
1	(Brazil) Diogo Acosta	Dibba Al Fujairah	27
2	(Brazil) Vinícius Lopes	Al Hamriyah	22
3	(Brazil) Dedê Costa	Dibba Al Hisn	19
4	(Brazil) Alex	Al Arabi	18
5	(Oman) Mohammed Al-Marbuii	Dibba Al Hisn	17

== Number of teams by Emirates ==
	Emirate	Number of teams	Teams
1	(Emirate of Ras Al Khaimah) Ras Al Khaimah	4	Al Jazira Al Hamra, Al Rams, Al Taawon and Masafi
1	(Emirate of Sharjah) Sharjah	4	Al Bataeh, Al Dhaid, Al Hamriyah and Dibba Al Hisn
3	(Emirate of Dubai) Dubai	3	Abtal Al Khaleej, Dubai City and Hatta
4	Fujairah	2	Dibba Al Fujairah and Fujairah
5	(Emirate of Umm Al Quwain) Umm Al Quwain	1	Al Arabi
5	(Emirate of Ajman) Ajman	1	Masfout
