= 2020–21 UAE Division 1 =

UAE Division One
- Season: 2020–21
- Dates: 13 November 2020 – 24 April 2021
- Champions: Al Urooba (2nd title)
- Promoted: Al Urooba; Emirates
- Matches: 110
- Goals: 316 (2.87 per match)
- Top goalscorer: Diogo Acosta (20 goals)
- Biggest home win: Emirates 6–0 Masafi (16 April 2021)
- Biggest away win: Al Taawon 0–4 Al Urooba (26 March 2021)
- Highest scoring: Al Taawon 5–4 Masfout (21 November 2020)
- Longest winning run: Al Urooba (5 games)
- Longest unbeaten run: Emirates (15 games)
- Longest winless run: Al Dhaid (17 games)
- Longest losing run: Al Dhaid (8 games)

2020–21 UAE Division one was the 44th Division one season. Since last season was cancelled and no promotion was rewarded, there were no team changes taken place this season. On the 17 April, both Al Urooba and Emirates secured promotion after defeating Dhaid and Masafi respectively.

== Stadia and locations ==
Locations of teams in the UAE Division One

Note:' Table lists clubs in alphabetical order.

Club	Home city	Stadium	Capacity
Al Arabi	Umm al Quwain	Umm al Quwain Stadium	3,000
Al Bataeh	Al Bataeh	Al Bataeh Stadium	2,000
Al Dhaid	Dhaid	Al-Dhaid Stadium	500
Al Hamriyah	Al Hamriyah	Al Hamriya Sports Club Stadium	5,000
Al Taawon	Al Jeer	Taawon Stadium	200
Al Urooba	Qidfa	Al Sharqi Stadium	3,000
Dibba Al Fujairah	Dibba Al-Fujairah	Dibba (F) Stadium	100
Dibba Al Hisn	Dibba Al-Hisn	Dibba (H) Stadium	700
Emirates	Ras Al Khaimah	Emirates Club Stadium	5,200
Masafi	Masafi	Masafi Stadium	2,000
Masfout	Masfout	Masfout Club Stadium	3,000

== Personnel and kits ==
Note: Flags indicate national team as has been defined under FIFA eligibility rules. Players may hold more than one non-FIFA nationality.

Team	Head coach	Captain	Kit Manufacturer	Shirt Sponsor
Al Arabi	(United Arab Emirates) Mohammed Al Musharrakh	(Ivory Coast) Bakare Kone	Nike	QQ Holding
Al Bataeh	(United Arab Emirates) Abdullah Mesfer	(United Arab Emirates) Eisa Ali	uhlsport	SMC
Al Dhaid	(United Arab Emirates) Mohamed Al Ajmani	(United Arab Emirates) Ali Al-Nuaimi	uhlsport	uhlsport
Al Hamriyah	(United Arab Emirates) Mohamed Ismail	(United Arab Emirates) Ali Rabee	Nike	SBR
Al Taawon	(United Arab Emirates) Aaref Al Shehhi	(United Arab Emirates) Rashed Humaid	uhlsport	
Al Urooba	(Tunisia) Fathi Al-Obeidi	(United Arab Emirates) Hassan Mohammed	uhlsport	Fujairah TV
Dibba Al Fujairah	(United Arab Emirates) Sulaiman Al Balooshi	(United Arab Emirates) Faisel Al-Khodaim	uhlsport	
Dibba Al Hisn	(United Arab Emirates) Abdulghani Binkarshat	(United Arab Emirates) Mahmoud Hassan	uhlsport	
Emirates	(North Macedonia) Gjoko Hadžievski	(United Arab Emirates) Abdullah Malallah	uhlsport	
Masafi	(United Arab Emirates) Mohamed Al Khaddeim	(Ivory Coast) Brahima Diakite	Adidas	Al Futaim
Masfout	(Tunisia) Tarek Hadhiri	(United Arab Emirates) Hassan Al-Hammadi	Nike	

=== Foreign players ===
All teams could register as many foreign players as they want, but could only use two on the field each game.

- Players name in **bold** indicates the player is registered during the mid-season transfer window.
- Players in italics were out of the squad or left the club within the season, after the pre-season transfer window, or in the mid-season transfer window, and at least had one appearance.

Club	Player 1	Player 2	Former Players
Al Arabi	(Brazil) Paulo Henrique	(Brazil) Vinícius Lopes	
Al Bataeh	(Brazil) Dedê Costa	(Ghana) **William Owusu**	(Brazil) Alex
Al Hamriyah	(Brazil) **Luan Santos**	(Madagascar) Faneva Andriatsima	(Brazil) Élton
Al Dhaid	(Brazil) **Erick Kassi**	(Venezuela) **Jeffrén Suárez**	(Brazil) Adeílson (Brazil) Dionatan Machado
Al Taawon	(Brazil) Gil Paraíba	(Brazil) Fidélis	
Al Urooba	(Brazil) Rodrigo	(France) Fatrie Sakhi	
Dibba Al Fujairah	(Brazil) Bruno Moraes	(Italy) **Manuel Pucciarelli**	(Brazil) Dudu Figueiredo
Dibba Al Hisn	(Algeria) Sid Ahmed Aouadj	(Cape Verde) **Mailson Lima**	(Nigeria) Ibrahim Mustapha
Emirates	(Brazil) Diogo Acosta	(Jordan) **Yaseen al-Bakhit**	(Colombia) Tommy Tobar
Masafi	(Ivory Coast) Brahima Diakite	(Cameroon) **Marius Obekop**	(Ivory Coast) Mechac Koffi
Masfout	(Brazil) **Bruno Dybal**	(Brazil) **Dionatan Machado**	(France) Yacine Abed (Serbia) Nikola Ašćerić

=== Managerial changes ===
Team	Outgoing manager	Date of vacancy	Manner of departure	Pos.	Incoming manager	Date of appointment
Dibba Al Hisn	(United Arab Emirates) Sulaiman Al Balooshi	1 June 2020	End of contract	Pre-season	(Portugal) Rui Ferreira	17 July 2020
Al Arabi	(Croatia) Predrag Stilinović	1 June 2020	End of contract	Pre-season	(United Arab Emirates) Mohammad Al Jalboot	2 June 2020
Al Urooba	(Morocco) Brahim Boufoud	1 June 2020	End of contract	Pre-season	(Tunisia) Fathi Al-Obeidi	8 August 2020
Al Bataeh	(Egypt) Tareq Al Sayed	1 June 2020	End of contract	Pre-season	(Italy) Giovanni Tedesco	10 October 2020
Al Bataeh	(Italy) Giovanni Tedesco	30 October 2020	Resigned	Pre-season	(Morocco) Saeed Shakhit	31 October 2020
Al Arabi	(United Arab Emirates) Mohammed Al Jalboot	20 October 2020	End of caretaker spell	Pre-season	(United Arab Emirates) Mohammed Al Musharrakh	21 October 2020
Al Bataeh	(Morocco) Saeed Shakhit	24 November 2020	End of caretaker spell	6th	(Tunisia) Noureddine Abidi	24 November 2020
Dibba Al Hisn	(Portugal) Rui Ferreira	1 December 2020	Sacked	4th	(Uruguay) Walter Pandiani	2 December 2020
Al Hamriyah	(Tunisia) Ghazi Ghrairi	14 December 2020	Mutual consent	6th	(United Arab Emirates) Mohamed Ismail	20 January 2021
Masafi	(United Arab Emirates) Abdulghani Binkarshat	4 February 2021	End of contract	7th	(United Arab Emirates) Mohamed Al Khaddeim	4 February 2021
Dibba Al Hisn	(Uruguay) Walter Pandiani	10 February 2021	Resigned	6th	(United Arab Emirates) Abdulghani Binkarshat	12 February 2021
Al Bataeh	(Tunisia) Noureddine Abidi	28 February 2021	Sacked	3rd	(United Arab Emirates) Abdullah Mesfer	2 March 2021

== League table ==
Pos	Team	Pld	W	D	L	GF	GA	GD	Pts	Promotion
1	Al Urooba (C, P)	20	13	5	2	45	22	+23	44	Promotion to the UAE Pro League
2	Emirates (P)	20	11	8	1	44	22	+22	41	Promotion to the UAE Pro League
3	Al Bataeh	20	11	5	4	29	22	+7	38	
4	Dibba Al Fujairah	20	9	5	6	29	21	+8	32	
5	Dibba Al Hisn	20	7	7	6	34	33	+1	28	
6	Al Arabi	20	7	7	6	28	34	−6	28	
7	Al Hamriyah	20	6	9	5	30	27	+3	27	
8	Al Taawon	20	4	8	8	24	37	−13	20	
9	Masfout	20	5	3	12	26	32	−6	18	
10	Masafi	20	5	2	13	19	37	−18	17	
11	Al Dhaid	20	1	3	16	14	35	−21	6	

Source: soccerway
Rules for classification: 1) points; 2) head-to-head points; 3) goal difference; 4) number of goals scored.
(C) Champions; (P) Promoted

== Results ==
Home \ Away	ARB	BTH	HAM	TAW	URO	DAF	DAH	DHD	EMI	MSF	MST
Al Arabi		0–1	0–2	2–2	1–3	1–0	3–3	2–1	2–2	1–4	4–3
Al Bataeh	1–1		2–1	1–0	1–1	0–2	3–2	1–0	1–1	3–1	2–0
Al Hamriyah	2–3	2–2		1–1	2–2	1–1	1–0	2–1	0–2	4–0	2–1
Al Taawon	0–1	1–2	1–1		0–4	0–3	1–1	2–0	2–2	2–1	5–4
Al Urooba	1–1	4–2	2–0	4–0		1–1	4–3	3–0	3–2	3–0	2–0
Dibba Al Fujairah	1–2	1–0	1–1	3–4	2–0		1–2	2–0	0–2	2–1	1–0
Dibba Al Hisn	0–0	1–1	2–3	3–0	3–1	2–2		1–0	0–1	1–0	1–0
Dhaid	3–0	0–1	2–2	1–1	1–2	0–1	2–2		1–3	1–2	0–3
Emirates	2–2	3–2	1–1	1–1	1–1	3–2	5–1	2–1		6–0	2–1
Masafi	0–1	0–1	2–2	2–1	0–1	0–2	3–3	1–0	0–2		0–1
Masfout	3–1	1–2	1–0	0–0	2–3	1–1	2–3	2–0	1–1	0–2	

Source: soccerway
Legend: Blue = home team win; Yellow = draw; Red = away team win.

== Season statistics ==
=== Top scorers ===
As of 24 April 2021

Rank	Player	Club	Goals
1	(Brazil) Diogo Acosta	Emirates	20
2	(Nigeria) Victor Nwaneri	Al Urooba	15
3	(Brazil) Dedê Costa	Al Bataeh	11
3	(Oman) Mohammed Al-Marbuii	Dibba Al Hisn	11
4	(Brazil) Bruno Moraes	Dibba Al Fujairah	10
5	(France) Fatrie Sakhi	Al Urooba	9
5	(Oman) Saied Obaid	Al Urooba	9

== Number of teams by Emirates ==
	Emirate	Number of teams	Teams
1	(Emirate of Sharjah) Sharjah	4	Al Bataeh, Al Dhaid, Al Hamriyah and Dibba Al Hisn
2	(Emirate of Ras Al Khaimah) Ras Al Khaimah	3	Al Taawon, Masafi and Emirates
3	Fujairah	2	Al Urooba and Dibba Al Fujairah
4	(Emirate of Umm Al Quwain) Umm Al Quwain	1	Al Arabi
4	(Emirate of Ajman) Ajman	1	Masfout
