= 2019–20 UAE Division 1 =

UAE Division One
- Season: 2019–20
- Champions: No title rewarded
- Promoted: No Promotion rewarded
- Matches: 80
- Goals: 218 (2.73 per match)
- Top goalscorer: Vinícius Lopes (11 goals)
- Biggest home win: Emirates 5–1 Al Urooba (21 December 2019); Dibba Al Fujairah 4–0 Al Taawon (3 January 2020); Al Bataeh 5–1 Al Arabi (1 February 2020)
- Biggest away win: Masfout 1–5 Al Hamriyah (31 January 2020)
- Highest scoring: FC Dhaid 3–4 Emirates (28 December 2019); Emirates 4–3 Al Arabi (14 February 2020)
- Longest winning run: Emirates (9 games)
- Longest unbeaten run: Emirates (14 games)
- Longest winless run: Al Taawon (15 games)
- Longest losing run: Masafi (8 games)

2019–20 UAE Division one was the 44th Division one season. Team changes for the season include Al Bataeh who joined the league, while Hatta and Khor Fakkan was promoted to the UAE Pro League, while Dibba Al Fujairah and Emirates were relegated. However, the season was cancelled with 12 out of 14 UAE Pro League clubs voting in favour of cancelling the season and not a single division one club had a say on the matter. The decision was done due to the COVID-19 pandemic in the United Arab Emirates and no team were rewarded with promotion.

== Team changes ==
=== To Division 1 ===
Relegated from UAE Pro League

- Dibba Al Fujairah
- Emirates

Joined

- Al Bataeh

=== From Division 1 ===
Promoted to UAE Pro League

- Hatta
- Khor Fakkan

== Stadia and locations ==
Locations of teams in the UAE Division One

Note:' Table lists clubs in alphabetical order.

Club	Home city	Stadium	Capacity
Al Arabi	Umm al Quwain	Umm al Quwain Stadium	3,000
Al Bataeh	Al Bataeh	Al Bataeh Stadium	2,000
Al Hamriyah	Al Hamriyah	Al Hamriya Sports Club Stadium	5,000
Al Taawon	Al Jeer	Taawon Stadium	200
Al Urooba	Qidfa	Al Sharqi Stadium	3,000
Dibba Al Fujairah	Dibba Al-Fujairah	Dibba (F) Stadium	100
Dibba Al Hisn	Dibba Al-Hisn	Dibba (H) Stadium	700
Emirates	Ras Al Khaimah	Emirates Club Stadium	5,200
FC Dhaid	Dhaid	Al-Dhaid Stadium	500
Masafi	Masafi	Masafi Stadium	2,000
Masfout	Masfout	Masfout Club Stadium	3,000

== Personnel and kits ==
Note: Flags indicate national team as has been defined under FIFA eligibility rules. Players may hold more than one non-FIFA nationality.

Team	Head Coach	Captain	Kit Manufacturer	Shirt Sponsor
Al Arabi	(Croatia) Predrag Stilinović	(Ivory Coast) Bakare Kone	Nike	QQ Holding
Al Bataeh	(Egypt) Tareq Al Sayed	(United Arab Emirates) Eisa Ali	uhlsport	Sharjah Media City
Al Hamriyah	(Tunisia) Ghazi Ghrairi	(United Arab Emirates) Ali Rabee	Nike	SBR
Al Taawon	(United Arab Emirates) Mo Balooshi	(United Arab Emirates) Rashed Humaid	uhlsport	
FC Dhaid	(United Arab Emirates) Mohammed Saeed	(United Arab Emirates) Ali Al-Nuaimi	uhlsport	uhlsport
Al Urooba	(Morocco) Brahim Boufoud	(United Arab Emirates) Hassan Mohammed	uhlsport	Fujairah TV
Dibba Al Fujairah	(Egypt) Ahmed El Moujahid	(United Arab Emirates) Faisel Al-Khodaim	uhlsport	
Dibba Al Hisn	(United Arab Emirates) Sulaiman Al Balooshi	(United Arab Emirates) Mahmoud Hassan	uhlsport	
Emirates	(North Macedonia) Gjoko Hadžievski	(United Arab Emirates) Abdullah Ali	uhlsport	
Masafi	(United Arab Emirates) Mohammed Al Hosani	(Ivory Coast) Brahima Diakite	Adidas	Al Futaim
Masfout	(Tunisia) Tarek Hadhiri	(United Arab Emirates) Hassan Al-Hammadi	Nike	

=== Managerial changes ===
Team	Outgoing manager	Date of vacancy	Manner of departure	Pos.	Incoming manager	Date of appointment
Emirates	(United Arab Emirates) Eid Barout	31 October 2019	Sacked	Pre-season	(North Macedonia) Gjoko Hadžievski	3 November 2019
Masafi	(Morocco) Brahim Boufoud	???	End of contract	Pre-season	(United Arab Emirates) Jamal Al Hassani	???
Dibba Al Hisn	(Egypt) Fathy Mohamed	???	End of contract	Pre-season	(United Arab Emirates) Sulaiman Al Balooshi	???
Masfout	(United Arab Emirates) Badr Abdulrahman	???	End of contract	Pre-season	(United Arab Emirates) Abdulghani Binkarshat	???
Al Urooba	(Tunisia) Ghazi Ghrairi	???	Signed by Al Hamriyah	Pre-season	(Tunisia) Yousri Kahla	???
Al Hamriyah	(United Arab Emirates) Mohamed Ismail	???	End of contract	Pre-season	(Tunisia) Ghazi Ghrairi	???
Al Urooba	(Tunisia) Yousri Kahla	30 November 2019	Resigned	5th	(Croatia) Dalibor Starcevic	10 December 2019
Dibba Al Fujairah	(Brazil) Sergio Alexandre	31 January 2020	Sacked	4th	(Egypt) Ahmed El Moujahid	1 February 2020
Al Taawon	(Tunisia) Tarek Hadhiri	9 February 2020	Sacked	11th	(United Arab Emirates) Mohammed Al Balooshi	10 February 2020
Masfout	(United Arab Emirates) Abdulghani Binkarshat	15 February 2020	Sacked	6th	(Tunisia) Tarek Hadhiri	16 February 2020
Masafi	(United Arab Emirates) Jamal Al Hassani	21 February 2020	Sacked	10th	(United Arab Emirates) Mohammed Al Hosani	22 February 2020
Al Urooba	(Croatia) Dalibor Starcevic	28 February 2020	Sacked	8th	(Morocco) Brahim Boufoud	29 February 2020

=== Foreign players ===
Club	Player 1	Player 2	Former Players
Al-Arabi	(Brazil) Alexandre Matão	(Ivory Coast) Bakare Kone	(Croatia) Ivor Weitzer
Al-Bataeh	(Brazil) Alex	(Brazil) Erick	(Brazil) Dedê
Al-Hamriyah	(Brazil) Luan Santos	(Italy) Maurizio Vella	(Brazil) Gilmar
Al-Taawon	(Ivory Coast) Mechac Koffi	(Tunisia) Mohamed Seghaier Nasri	(Brazil) David
Al-Urooba	(France) Harry Novillo	(France) Jean-Philippe Mendy	(Brazil) Taylon Correa (France) Omar Kossoko

== League table ==
Pos	Team	Pld	W	D	L	GF	GA	GD	Pts
1	Emirates	16	12	3	1	32	14	+18	39
2	Dibba Al Hisn	16	9	5	2	20	11	+9	32
3	Al Bataeh	16	8	5	3	24	13	+11	29
4	Al Hamriyah	15	7	6	2	21	12	+9	27
5	Dibba Al Fujairah	16	7	5	4	27	17	+10	26
6	Masfout	16	6	4	6	24	24	0	22
7	Dhaid	15	5	2	8	15	23	−8	17
8	Al Arabi	15	4	5	6	22	26	−4	17
9	Al Urooba	15	4	2	9	19	28	−9	14
10	Masafi	15	3	1	11	10	26	−16	10
11	Al Taawon	15	0	2	13	14	34	−20	2

Updated to match(es) played on 14 March 2020. Source: uaefa
Rules for classification: 1) points; 2) head-to-head points; 3) goal difference; 4) number of goals scored.

== Results ==
Home \ Away	ARB	BTH	HAM	TAW	URO	DAF	DAH	DHD	EMI	MSF	MST
Al Arabi		—	0–2	3–1	—	1–2	2–2	2–0	0–0	1–2	2–2
Al Bataeh	5–1		—	1–0	2–1	0–0	0–0	3–0	0–1	2–0	—
Al Hamriyah	1–1	1–1		1–0	1–0	2–2	0–1	2–1	1–2	—	—
Al Taawon	1–2	1–2	2–2		1–2	—	1–2	—	0–1	2–2	2–3
Al Urooba	1–3	2–3	—	—		—	2–3	0–1	1–2	1–0	2–2
Dibba Al Fujairah	—	1–1	1–2	4–0	0–3		—	2–0	2–0	4–1	0–1
Dibba Al Hisn	2–0	1–0	0–0	—	—	1–1		2–1	1–1	2–0	1–0
Al Dhaid	—	2–1	—	2–1	2–2	1–1	—		3–4	0–2	1–0
Emirates	4–3	—	0–0	3–1	5–1	2–0	1–0	—		3–0	3–1
Masafi	—	1–2	0–1	—	0–1	1–4	1–0	0–1	—		0–2
Masfout	1–1	1–1	1–5	4–1	3–0	1–3	1–2	1–0	—	—	

Updated to match(es) played on 2020. Source: soccerway
Legend: Blue = home team win; Yellow = draw; Red = away team win.

== Season statistics ==
=== Top goal scorers ===
As of 29 June 2020

Rank	Player	Club	Goals
1	(Brazil) Vinícius Lopes	Dibba Al Fujairah	11
1	(Brazil) Alexssander azeredo	Al Hamriya	11
2	(Oman) Mohammed Al-Marbuii	Al Dhaid	9

== Number of teams by Emirates ==
	Emirate	Number of teams	Teams
1	(Emirate of Sharjah) Sharjah	4	Al Bataeh, Al Hamriyah, Al Dhaid and Dibba Al Hisn
2	(Emirate of Ras Al Khaimah) Ras Al Khaimah	3	Al Taawon, Masafi and Emirates
3	Fujairah	2	Al Urooba and Dibba Al Fujairah
4	(Emirate of Umm Al Quwain) Umm Al Quwain	1	Al Arabi
4	(Emirate of Ajman) Ajman	1	Masfout
