= 2018–19 UAE Division 1 =

UAE Division One
- Season: 2018–19
- Champions: Khor Fakkan (6th title)
- Promoted: Khor Fakkan; Hatta
- Matches: 82
- Goals: 212 (2.59 per match)
- Top goalscorer: Vinícius Lopes (16 goals)
- Biggest home win: Hatta 4–0 Masafi
- Biggest away win: Masafi 0–6 Al Arabi (8 March 2019)
- Highest scoring: Al Arabi 2–6 Hatta (14 December 2018)
- Longest winning run: Hatta (5 games)
- Longest unbeaten run: Hatta (12 games)
- Longest winless run: Masfut (10 games)
- Longest losing run: Masfut (6 games)

2018–19 UAE Division one (stylized as UAE Division 1) was the 43rd Division one season. Team changes for the season include Al Taawon who joined the league to replace Ras Al Khaimah who withdrew due to financial reasons, while Hatta was relegated from the UAE Pro League last year and the top 3 teams of last year's season (Baniyas, Kalba and Fujairah), were all promoted to the Pro League.

== Team changes ==
=== To Division 1 ===
Relegated from UAE Pro League

- Hatta

Rejoined after withdrawal

- Al Taawon

=== From Division 1 ===
Promoted to UAE Pro League

- Baniyas
- Kalba
- Fujairah

=== Teams that withdrew ===
- Ras Al Khaimah

== Stadia and locations ==
Locations of teams in the UAE Division One

Note: Table lists clubs in alphabetical order.

Club	Home city	Stadium	Capacity
Al Arabi	Umm al Quwain	Umm al Quwain Stadium	3,000
Al Hamriyah	Al Hamriyah	Al Hamriya Sports Club Stadium	5,000
Khor Fakkan	Khor Fakkan	Saqr bin Mohammad al Qassimi Stadium	4,373
Al Taawon	Al Jeer	Mohammed Bin Saud Al Qasimi Stadium	2,000
FC Dhaid	Dhaid	Al-Dhaid Stadium	500
Al Urooba	Mirbah	Al Sharqi Stadium	3,000
Dibba Al-Hisn	Dibba Al-Hisn	Dibba Al Hisn Stadium	700
Hatta	Hatta	Hamdan Bin Rashid Stadium	5,000
Masafi	Masafi	Masafi Stadium	2,000
Masfut	Masfut	Masfut Club Stadium	3,000

=== Number of teams by Emirates ===
	Emirate	Number of teams	Teams
1	(Emirate of Sharjah) Sharjah	4	Al Hamriyah, Al Dhaid, Dibba Al Hisn, Khor Fakkan
2	(Emirate of Ras Al Khaimah) Ras Al Khaimah	2	Al Taawon, Masafi
3	(Emirate of Umm Al Quwain) Umm Al Quwain	1	Al Arabi
3	Fujairah	1	Al Urooba
3	(Emirate of Dubai) Dubai	1	Hatta
3	(Emirate of Ajman) Ajman	1	Masfut

== Personnel and kits ==
Note: Flags indicate national team as has been defined under FIFA eligibility rules. Players may hold more than one non-FIFA nationality.

Team	Head coach	Captain	Kit manufacturer	Shirt sponsor
Al Arabi	(Croatia) Predrag Stilinović	(Ivory Coast) Brahima Diakite	Nike	Al Futaim
Al Hamriyah	(United Arab Emirates) Mohamed Ismail	(United Arab Emirates) Khairi Khalfan	Nike	Sharjah Beach Resort
Khor Fakkan	(Iraq) Abdulwahab Abdulkadir	(United Arab Emirates) Saif Mohammed	Adidas	Khor Fakkan Beach Resort
Al Taawon	(Tunisia) Tarek Hadhiri	(Brazil) David	Unknown	Unknown
Al Dhaid	(United Arab Emirates) Mohammed Saeed	(United Arab Emirates) Salem Al-Qaidi	uhlsport	uhlsport
Al Urooba	(Tunisia) Ghazi Ghrairi	(United Arab Emirates) Hassan Mohammed	uhlsport	Fujairah TV
Dibba Al-Hisn	(Egypt) Fathy Mohamed	(United Arab Emirates) Salem Al-Nuaimi	uhlsport	Chips Oman
Hatta	(United Arab Emirates) Walid Obaid	(United Arab Emirates) Mahmoud Hassan	Macron	Macron
Masafi	(Morocco) Brahim Boufoud	(United Arab Emirates) Abdulla Al-Shahyari	Adidas	Al Futaim
Masfut	(United Arab Emirates) Badr Abdulrahman	(United Arab Emirates) Salem Khamis	Nike	Masdar

=== Managerial changes ===
Team	Outgoing manager	Date of vacancy	Manner of departure	Pos.	Incoming manager	Date of appointment
Khor Fakkan	(United Arab Emirates) Badir Ahmed Al Hammadi	2 February 2019	End of Contract	2nd	(Iraq) Abdulwahab Abdulkadir	3 February 2019
Al Urooba	(Brazil) Sérgio Alexandre	2 February 2019	End of Contract	1st	(Tunisia) Ghazi Ghrairi	3 February 2019
Dibba Al-Hisn	(United Arab Emirates) Badr Abdulhraman	2 February 2019	End of Contract	7th	(Egypt) Fathy Mohamed	3 February 2019
Al Arabi	(Iraq) Jamal Ali	2 February 2019	End of Contract	11th	(Croatia) Predrag Stilinović	3 February 2019
Al Dhaid	(United Arab Emirates) Walid Obaid	2 February 2019	Sacked	12th	(United Arab Emirates) Mohammed Saeed	3 February 2019
Al Taawon	(Morocco) Abderrazak Amrani	8 March 2019	Sacked	11th	(Tunisia) Tarek Hadhiri	9 March 2019
Hatta	(Kosovo) Nenad Vanić	22 March 2019	Sacked	5th	(United Arab Emirates) Walid Obaid	23 March 2019
Al Hamriyah	(United Arab Emirates) Sulaiman Hasan	7 April 2019	Resigned	3rd	(United Arab Emirates) Mohamed Ismail	8 April 2019

=== Foreign players ===
Club	Player 1	Player 2	Former Players
Al-Arabi	(Egypt) Mohamed Mahmoud	(Ivory Coast) Brahima Diakité	(Romania) Mihai Costea
Al-Hamriyah	(Brazil) Tomas Bastos	–	(Spain) Hugo López
Al-Taawon	(Brazil) David	(Ivory Coast) Alassane Diomandé	–
Al-Urooba	(Brazil) Adeílson	(Ghana) Kwame Karikari	(Brazil) Francisco Torres
Dibba Al-Hisn	(Brazil) Vinícius Lopes	(Yemen) Ahmed Dhabaan	–
FC Dhaid	(Brazil) Alexandre Matão	(Oman) Mohamed Al-Marbuii	(Togo) Camaldine Abraw
Hatta	(Brazil) Gilmar	(Brazil) Luan Santos	–
Khor Fakkan	(Brazil) Rodrigo	(Ukraine) Miro Slavov	(Brazil) Marcus Vinícius
Masafi	(Guinea) Simon Feindouno	(Senegal) Yally Fall Guène	–
Masfut	(France) Jean-Louis Akpa Akpro	–	(Tunisia) Mohamed Ali Ben Hammouda

== League table ==
Pos	Team	Pld	W	D	L	GF	GA	GD	Pts	Promotion
1	Khor Fakkan (C, P)	18	12	2	4	26	12	+14	38	Promotion to the UAE Pro-League
2	Hatta (P)	18	11	4	3	34	14	+20	37 (Note: Hatta are ahead of Al Urooba on head-to-head points: Al Urooba 2–1 Hatta, Hatta 3–1 Al Urooba.)	Promotion to the UAE Pro-League
3	Al Urooba	18	11	4	3	27	16	+11	37	
4	Al Hamriyah	18	9	5	4	29	16	+13	32	
5	Dibba Al Hisn	18	8	5	5	29	26	+3	29	
6	Masafi	18	7	4	7	20	35	−15	25	
7	Al Dhaid	18	6	3	9	24	23	+1	21	
8	Al Arabi	18	5	1	12	22	36	−14	16	
9	Al Taawon	18	4	2	12	21	35	−14	14	
10	Masfut	18	1	2	15	11	25	−14	5	

Updated to match(es) played on 2019. Source: http://www.uaefa.ae/#/en/competition/1121
Rules for classification: 1) points; 2) head-to-head points; 3) goal difference; 4) number of goals scored.
(C) Champions; (P) Promoted

== Results ==
Home \ Away	ARB	HAM	TAW	URO	DAH	DHD	KHF	HAT	MSF	MST
Al Arabi		0–1	3–2	1–2	1–3	1–1	0–2	2–6	2–3	2–1
Al Hamriyah	3–1		5–2	0–0	1–2	1–0	0–2	0–1	1–1	2–1
Al Taawon	5–2	0–3		0–1	1–2	1–3	0–2	1–0	1–2	1–0
Al Urooba	3–1	1–1	3–2		1–0	2–0	0–1	2–1	3–1	2–2
Dibba Al Hisn	3–1	1–1	3–3	0–2		3–1	0–2	1–5	4–1	1–0
Dhaid	2–0	1–2	1–0	1–2	1–1		1–2	0–2	4–1	3–0
Khor Fakkan	1–0	2–1	3–0	0–1	2–2	1–0		0–1	0–1	1–3
Hatta	0–1	2–2	1–0	3–1	1–1	2–1	1–1		4–0	1–0
Masafi	0–6	0–2	1–1	2–1	1–0	1–1	0–1	0–0		1–0
Masfut	0–1	0–1	0–1	0–0	1–2	0–1	2–3	1–3	2–3	

Updated to match(es) played on 2019. Source:
Legend: Blue = home team win; Yellow = draw; Red = away team win.
