= 2023–24 UAE Pro League =

UAE Pro League
- Season: 2023–24
- Dates: 18 August 2023 – 7 June 2024
- Champions: Al Wasl (8th title)
- Relegated: Hatta; Emirates
- AFC Champions League Elite: Al Wasl; Al Ain; Shabab Al Ahli
- AFC Champions League Two: Sharjah
- AGCFF Gulf Club Champions League: Al-Nasr
- Matches: 182
- Goals: 624 (3.43 per match)
- Top goalscorer: Omar Khribin (19 goals)
- Biggest home win: Shabab Al Ahli 10–0 Hatta (2 June 2024)
- Biggest away win: Hatta 0–5 Al Wasl (27 October 2023)
- Highest scoring: Shabab Al Ahli 10–0 Hatta (2 June 2024)
- Longest winning run: Al Wasl (9 games)
- Longest unbeaten run: Al Wasl (21 games)
- Longest winless run: Hatta (19 games)
- Longest losing run: Emirates (11 games)

The 2023–24 UAE Pro League was the 49th edition of the UAE Pro League. Shabab Al Ahli were the defending champions.

== Teams ==
=== Team changes ===
==== Promoted to the Pro League ====
Hatta secured promotion to the pro league after a decisive 3–2 victory over Al Rams. Hatta are returning after two seasons of absence. Emirates would secure promotion on the second last matchday after winning 4–3 against Al Rams, coincidentally the same club Hatta beat. This will be Emirates 10th season in the Pro League.

==== Relegated to the First Division ====
Al Dhafra got relegated after losing to Ajman 2–1. This marks the fourth time Al Dhafra got relegated in the top flight with the last time being in 2010–11 season. Dibba Al Fujairah soon followed after drawing 1–1 to Al Dhafra, ending their short spell in the Pro League a year after Dibba Al Fujairah got promoted as division 1 champions.

=== Stadium and locations ===
Locations of teams in the 2023–24 UAE Pro League

Note: Table lists clubs in alphabetical order.

| Team | Home city | Stadium | Capacity |
|---|---|---|---|
| Ajman | Ajman | Ajman Stadium | 5,537 |
| Al Ain | Al-Ain | Hazza Bin Zayed Stadium | 25,965 |
| Al Bataeh | Al Bataeh | Al Bataeh Stadium | 2,000 |
| Al Jazira | Abu Dhabi (Al Nahyan) | Mohammad Bin Zayed Stadium | 42,056 |
| Al Nasr | Dubai (Al Nasr) | Al-Maktoum Stadium | 15,058 |
| Al Wahda | Abu Dhabi (Al Nahyan) | Al Nahyan Stadium | 12,201 |
| Al Wasl | Dubai (Zabeel) | Zabeel Stadium | 8,439 |
| Baniyas | Abu Dhabi (Al Shamkha) | Baniyas Stadium | 10,000 |
| Emirates | Ras Al Khaimah | Emirates Club Stadium | 5,200 |
| Hatta | Hatta | Hamdan Bin Rashid Stadium | 5,000 |
| Kalba | Kalba | Ittihad Kalba Stadium | 8,500 |
| Khor Fakkan | Khor Fakkan | SBM Al Qassimi Stadium | 7,500 |
| Shabab Al Ahli | Dubai (Deira) | Al-Rashid Stadium | 12,052 |
| Sharjah | Sharjah | Sharjah Stadium | 35,000 |

== Personnel and kits ==
Note: Flags indicate national team as has been defined under FIFA eligibility rules. Players may hold more than one non-FIFA nationality.

| Team | Head Coach | Captain | Kit Manufacturer | Shirt Sponsor |
|---|---|---|---|---|
| Ajman | (Romania) Daniel Isăilă | (United Arab Emirates) Saoud Saeed | Adidas | Ajman Bank |
| Al Ain | (Argentina) Hernán Crespo | (United Arab Emirates) Bandar Al-Ahbabi | Nike | First Abu Dhabi Bank |
| Al Bataeh | (Croatia) Goran Tomić | (United Arab Emirates) Mohamed Ahmed | Nike | Majid Al Futtaim Group |
| Al Jazira | (France) Grégory Dufrennes | (United Arab Emirates) Ali Khasif | Zat Outfit | Healthpoint |
| Al Nasr | (Netherlands) Alfred Schreuder | (United Arab Emirates) Ahmed Shambih | Adidas | Emirates Islamic |
| Al Wahda | (Serbia) Goran Tufegdžić | (Brazil) Allan | Adidas | Volkswagen |
| Al Wasl | (Serbia) Miloš Milojević | (United Arab Emirates) Ali Salmeen | Macron | Dubai Real Estate Centre |
| Baniyas | (Slovenia) Darko Milanič | (United Arab Emirates) Fawaz Awana | Macron | ADIB |
| Emirates | (Italy) Benito Carbone | (Spain) Andrés Iniesta | uhlsport | RAK Ceramics |
| Hatta | (Serbia) Nenad Vanić | (Slovakia) Vernon De Marco | uhlsport | Emaar |
| Kalba | (Iraq) Ghazi Fahad | (United Arab Emirates) Abdusalam Mohammed | Adidas | Caltex |
| Khor Fakkan | (Montenegro) Nebojša Jovović | (United Arab Emirates) Masoud Sulaiman | Macron | ADNOC |
| Shabab Al Ahli | (Serbia) Marko Nikolić | (United Arab Emirates) Majed Naser | Nike | Mai Dubai |
| Sharjah | (Romania) Cosmin Olăroiu | (United Arab Emirates) Shahin Abdulrahman | Adidas | SAIF Zone |

=== Managerial changes ===
| Team | Outgoing manager | Date of vacancy | Manner of departure | Pos. | Incoming manager | Date of appointment |
|---|---|---|---|---|---|---|
| Al Wasl | (Spain) Juan Antonio Pizzi | 16 May 2023 | Mutual consent | Pre-season | (Serbia) Miloš Milojević | 2 June 2023 |
| Al Bataeh | (Morocco) Saeed Shakhit | 25 May 2023 | End of caretaker spell | Pre-season | (Romania) Mirel Rădoi | 25 May 2023 |
| Al Jazira | (Netherlands) Marcel Keizer | 26 May 2023 | End of contract | Pre-season | (Netherlands) Frank de Boer | 5 June 2023 |
| Al Ain | (Ukraine) Serhiy Rebrov | 27 May 2023 | End of contract | Pre-season | (Netherlands) Alfred Schreuder | 27 May 2023 |
| Hatta | (United Arab Emirates) Abdullah Mesfer | 1 June 2023 | Mutual consent | Pre-season | (Serbia) Željko Markov | 6 June 2023 |
| Shabab Al Ahli | (Portugal) Leonardo Jardim | 1 June 2023 | End of contract | Pre-season | (Serbia) Marko Nikolić | 2 June 2023 |
| Baniyas | (Romania) Daniel Isăilă | 1 June 2023 | End of contract | Pre-season | (Slovenia) Darko Milanič | 8 June 2023 |
| Al Nasr | (Croatia) Goran Tomić | 5 June 2023 | End of contract | Pre-season | (Serbia) Goran Tufegdžić | 5 June 2023 |
| Ajman | (Serbia) Goran Tufegdžić | 5 June 2023 | Signed by Al Nasr | Pre-season | (Brazil) Caio Zanardi | 6 June 2023 |
| Al Wahda | (Netherlands) Arno Buitenweg | 18 June 2023 | End of caretaker spell | Pre-season | (South Africa) Pitso Mosimane | 18 June 2023 |
| Hatta | (Serbia) Željko Markov | 4 September 2023 | Sacked | 13th | (Italy) Fabio Viviani | 5 September 2023 |
| Emirates | (United Arab Emirates) Mohammed Al Jalboot | 5 September 2023 | Mutual consent | 10th | (Spain) Lluís Planagumà | 5 September 2023 |
| Khor Fakkan | (United Arab Emirates) Abdulaziz Al Anberi | 24 September 2023 | Mutual consent | 10th | (Spain) Gerard Zaragoza | 29 September 2023 |
| Ajman | (Brazil) Caio Zanardi | 3 October 2023 | Sacked | 13th | (Romania) Daniel Isăilă | 3 October 2023 |
| Khor Fakkan | (Spain) Gerard Zaragoza | 28 October 2023 | Sacked | 12th | (Montenegro) Nebojša Jovović | 29 October 2023 |
| Al Nasr | (Serbia) Goran Tufegdžić | 6 November 2023 | Sacked | 10th | (Italy) Fabrizio Cammarata | 6 November 2023 |
| Al Ain | (Netherlands) Alfred Schreuder | 8 November 2023 | Mutual consent | 3rd | (Argentina) Hernán Crespo | 14 November 2023 |
| Al Wahda | (South Africa) Pitso Mosimane | 9 November 2023 | Sacked | 5th | (Netherlands) Arno Buitenweg | 9 November 2023 |
| Al Nasr | (Italy) Fabrizio Cammarata | 27 November 2023 | End of caretaker spell | 9th | (Netherlands) Alfred Schreuder | 27 November 2023 |
| Al Jazira | (Netherlands) Frank de Boer | 13 December 2023 | Sacked | 7th | (Netherlands) Bob de Klerk | 14 December 2023 |
| Emirates | (Spain) Lluís Planagumà | 21 December 2023 | Sacked | 14th | (United Arab Emirates) Aaref Al Shehhi | 21 December 2023 |
| Al Bataeh | (Romania) Mirel Rădoi | 25 December 2023 | Resigned | 7th | (Croatia) Goran Tomić | 7 January 2024 |
| Al Wahda | (Netherlands) Arno Buitenweg | 3 January 2024 | End of caretaker spell | 5th | (Serbia) Goran Tufegdžić | 3 January 2024 |
| Al Jazira | (Netherlands) Bob de Klerk | 5 January 2024 | End of caretaker spell | 6th | (Romania) Mirel Rădoi | 5 January 2024 |
| Emirates | (United Arab Emirates) Aaref Al Shehhi | 5 January 2024 | End of caretaker spell | 14th | (Italy) Walter Zenga | 5 January 2024 |
| Ittihad Kalba | (Iran) Farhad Majidi | 2 March 2024 | Sacked | 11th | (Iraq) Ghazi Fahad | 2 March 2024 |
| Hatta | (Italy) Fabio Viviani | 15 March 2024 | Sacked | 14th | (Serbia) Nenad Vanić | 17 March 2024 |
| Al Jazira | (Romania) Mirel Rădoi | 8 April 2024 | Sacked | 8th | (France) Grégory Dufrennes | 9 April 2024 |
| Emirates | (Italy) Walter Zenga | 24 April 2024 | Mutual consent | 13th | (Italy) Benito Carbone | 24 April 2024 |

== Foreign players ==
All teams can register many foreigners as they want but could only include up to five professional players. Players in the age of under-23 do not counted as professionals.

- Players name in **bold** indicates the player is registered during the mid-season transfer window.
- Players in italics were out of the squad or left the club within the season, after the pre-season transfer window, or in the mid-season transfer window, and at least had one appearance.

| Club | Player 1 | Player 2 | Player 3 | Player 4 | Player 5 | Former players |
|---|---|---|---|---|---|---|
| Ajman | (Bahrain) Ali Madan | (Brazil) **Dodô** | (Morocco) Walid Azaro | (Serbia) **Miloš Kosanović** | (Tunisia) Haykeul Chikhaoui | (Republic of the Congo) Prestige Mboungou (Tunisia) Nader Ghandri |
| Al Ain | (Israel) Omer Atzili | (Morocco) Soufiane Rahimi | (Paraguay) Kaku | (South Korea) Park Yong-woo | (Togo) Kodjo Fo-Doh Laba | |
| Al Bataeh | (Brazil) Paulinho | (Cameroon) Anatole Abang | (Cameroon) Petrus Boumal | (Cape Verde) Diney | (Ivory Coast) Ulrich Meleke | |
| Al Jazira | (Brazil) Fernando | (Democratic Republic of the Congo) Neeskens Kebano | (Mauritania) Aboubakar Kamara | (Netherlands) Karim Rekik | (Spain) Alejandro Pozuelo | |
| Al Nasr | (Bosnia and Herzegovina) Samir Memišević | (Colombia) Kevin Agudelo | (Italy) Manolo Gabbiadini | (Morocco) Adel Taarabt | (Portugal) Iuri Medeiros | |
| Al Wahda | (Brazil) Allan | (Iran) Ahmad Nourollahi | (Russia) Zelimkhan Bakayev | (Ba'athist Syria) Omar Khribin | (Uzbekistan) **Khojimat Erkinov** | (Argentina) Cristian Guanca (Brazil) João Pedro |
| Al Wasl | (Argentina) Gerónimo Poblete | (Colombia) Alexis Pérez | (Morocco) Soufiane Bouftini | (South Korea) **Jung Seung-hyun** | (Switzerland) Haris Seferovic | (Argentina) Nicolás Giménez |
| Baniyas | (Albania) Taulant Seferi | (Argentina) Gastón Álvarez Suárez | (Republic of the Congo) **Prestige Mboungou** | (Mali) Youssoufou Niakaté | (Serbia) Saša Ivković | (Portugal) Francisco Geraldes |
| Emirates | (Israel) **Dia Saba** | (Jordan) **Nizar Al-Rashdan** | (Serbia) Uroš Vitas | (Spain) Paco Alcácer | (Spain) Andrés Iniesta | (Brazil) Diogo Acosta (Cameroon) Franck Kom (Japan) **Leo Osaki** (Libya) Al Sanousi Al Hadi |
| Hatta | (Brazil) Gabrielzinho | (Central African Republic) **Lobi Manzoki** | (Democratic Republic of the Congo) Aaron Tshibola | (Nigeria) **Chisom Egbuchulam** | (Slovakia) Vernon De Marco | (Kazakhstan) Alexander Merkel (Kuwait) Shabaib Al-Khaldi (Palestine) Moustafa Zeidan |
| Ittihad Kalba | (Brazil) Daniel Bessa | (Iran) Mehdi Ghayedi | (Netherlands) **Nigel Robertha** | (Slovakia) Filip Kiss | (Slovenia) Andrés Vombergar | (Brazil) Wallace (Cape Verde) Ivanildo Fernandes |
| Khor Fakkan | (Brazil) Lourency | (Brazil) **Raniel** | (South Africa) Thulani Serero | (Uzbekistan) Abdulla Abdullaev | (Uzbekistan) **Azizbek Amanov** | (Brazil) Pedro Castro (Brazil) Tiago Leonço (Tunisia) Saîf-Eddine Khaoui |
| Shabab Al Ahli | (Iran) **Saeid Ezatolahi** | (Israel) Mu'nas Dabbur | (Serbia) Luka Milivojević | (Serbia) Bogdan Planić | (Uzbekistan) Azizjon Ganiev | (Argentina) Federico Cartabia |
| Sharjah | (Bosnia and Herzegovina) Miralem Pjanić | (Mali) Moussa Marega | (South Korea) **Cho Yu-min** | (Tunisia) Firas Ben Larbi | (Greece) Kostas Manolas (Spain) Paco Alcácer | |

== League table ==
| Pos | Team | Pld | W | D | L | GF | GA | GD | Pts | Qualification or relegation |
|---|---|---|---|---|---|---|---|---|---|---|
| 1 | Al Wasl (C) | 26 | 21 | 4 | 1 | 70 | 27 | +43 | 67 | Qualification for AFC CLE League stage |
| 2 | Shabab Al Ahli | 26 | 18 | 4 | 4 | 73 | 34 | +39 | 58 | Qualification for AFC CLE play off round |
| 3 | Al Ain | 26 | 14 | 3 | 9 | 54 | 37 | +17 | 45 | Qualification for AFC CLE League stage (Note: As 2023–24 AFC Champions League winners.) |
| 4 | Sharjah | 26 | 10 | 12 | 4 | 53 | 40 | +13 | 42 (Note: Sharjah are ahead of Al Wahda on head-to-head points: Sharjah 3–2 Al Wahda, Al Wahda 1–1 Sharjah) | Qualification for AFC CL2 group stage |
| 5 | Al Wahda | 26 | 12 | 6 | 8 | 45 | 34 | +11 | 42 | |
| 6 | Al Nasr | 26 | 11 | 6 | 9 | 39 | 36 | +3 | 39 | Qualification for the AGCFF GCCL group stage |
| 7 | Al Bataeh | 26 | 10 | 7 | 9 | 42 | 44 | −2 | 37 | |
| 8 | Al Jazira | 26 | 9 | 8 | 9 | 50 | 47 | +3 | 35 | |
| 9 | Ajman | 26 | 8 | 10 | 8 | 39 | 47 | −8 | 34 | |
| 10 | Baniyas | 26 | 7 | 5 | 14 | 33 | 46 | −13 | 26 (Note: Baniyas are ahead of Kalba on head-to-head points: Baniyas 2–1 Kalba, Kalba 0–0 Baniyas) | |
| 11 | Kalba | 26 | 6 | 8 | 12 | 39 | 50 | −11 | 26 | |
| 12 | Khor Fakkan | 26 | 6 | 5 | 15 | 34 | 55 | −21 | 23 | |
| 13 | Emirates (R) | 26 | 4 | 5 | 17 | 32 | 60 | −28 | 17 | Relegation to UAE Division 1 |
| 14 | Hatta (R) | 26 | 1 | 7 | 18 | 20 | 66 | −46 | 10 | Relegation to UAE Division 1 |

Source: UPLeague
Rules for classification: 1) points; 2) head-to-head goal difference; 3) head-to-head goals scored; 4) head-to-head away goals scored; 5) goal difference; 6) number of goals scored; 7) number of away goals scored; 8) head-to-head points; 9) fair play ranking 10) draw
(C) Champions; (R) Relegated

== Results ==
| Home \ Away | AJM | AIN | BTH | JAZ | NAS | WAH | WAS | YAS | EMI | HAT | KAL | KHF | SAD | SHR |
|---|---|---|---|---|---|---|---|---|---|---|---|---|---|---|
| Ajman | | 0–4 | 2–0 | 2–0 | 0–3 | 0–1 | 1–4 | 1–1 | 2–0 | 1–1 | 3–5 | 3–0 | 0–3 | 2–2 |
| Al Ain | 6–0 | | 0–2 | 2–2 | 1–3 | 0–2 | 2–4 | 3–2 | 3–1 | 5–3 | 0–1 | 4–1 | 1–2 | 1–1 |
| Al Bataeh | 1–1 | 1–3 | | 3–2 | 1–3 | 1–2 | 1–4 | 2–1 | 3–2 | 1–1 | 0–0 | 3–1 | 0–2 | 3–3 |
| Al Jazira | 1–5 | 2–1 | 3–1 | | 2–3 | 1–2 | 2–4 | 1–0 | 2–0 | 3–1 | 2–2 | 3–3 | 1–1 | 1–1 |
| Al Nasr | 1–1 | 1–0 | 0–2 | 1–3 | | 1–1 | 0–2 | 1–0 | 2–1 | 1–0 | 2–2 | 2–1 | 3–2 | 0–1 |
| Al Wahda | 1–2 | 0–2 | 1–2 | 3–2 | 1–0 | | 2–2 | 3–1 | 4–1 | 1–0 | 2–1 | 1–1 | 3–3 | 1–1 |
| Al Wasl | 1–1 | 3–1 | 4–1 | 2–2 | 1–0 | 1–4 | | 3–2 | 1–0 | 3–0 | 2–1 | 3–0 | 3–0 | 2–0 |
| Baniyas | 1–1 | 0–1 | 3–3 | 1–4 | 4–2 | 2–1 | 0–2 | | 0–0 | 4–2 | 2–1 | 1–0 | 1–2 | 2–3 |
| Emirates | 4–4 | 2–3 | 1–3 | 0–1 | 2–1 | 0–0 | 0–2 | 1–2 | | 2–4 | 2–4 | 2–1 | 2–3 | 1–3 |
| Hatta | 0–0 | 0–2 | 0–0 | 1–1 | 0–3 | 0–4 | 0–5 | 0–1 | 1–1 | | 1–3 | 0–2 | 2–5 | 1–4 |
| Kalba | 2–4 | 2–2 | 1–2 | 0–4 | 0–0 | 1–0 | 2–4 | 0–0 | 1–2 | 2–1 | | 1–1 | 1–3 | 3–4 |
| Khor Fakkan | 1–2 | 0–1 | 0–3 | 4–2 | 3–1 | 3–2 | 3–3 | 2–1 | 0–2 | 2–1 | 2–2 | | 0–3 | 1–3 |
| Shabab Al Ahli | 3–0 | 0–3 | 2–1 | 3–2 | 3–3 | 3–1 | 1–2 | 2–1 | 7–0 | 10–0 | 4–1 | 2–1 | | 3–1 |
| Sharjah | 1–1 | 2–3 | 2–2 | 1–1 | 2–2 | 3–2 | 1–3 | 5–0 | 3–3 | 0–0 | 1–0 | 4–1 | 1–1 | |

Source: UPLeague
Legend: Blue = home team win; Yellow = draw; Red = away team win.
For upcoming matches, an "a" indicates there is an article about the rivalry between the two participants.

== Number of teams by Emirates ==
| | Emirate | Number of teams | Teams |
|---|---|---|---|
| 1 | (Emirate of Abu Dhabi) Abu Dhabi | 4 | Al Ain, Al Jazira, Al Wahda and Baniyas |
| 1 | (Emirate of Sharjah) Sharjah | 4 | Sharjah, Kalba, Khor Fakkan and Al Bataeh |
| 1 | (Emirate of Dubai) Dubai | 4 | Shabab Al Ahli, Al Nasr, Al Wasl and Hatta |
| 4 | (Emirate of Ajman) Ajman | 1 | Ajman |
| 4 | (Emirate of Ras Al Khaimah) Ras Al Khaimah | 1 | Emirates |

== Season statistics ==
=== Positions by round ===
| Leader and qualification to AFC Champions League Elite |
| qualification to AFC Champions League Two |
| Relegation to UAE First Division League |

| Team ╲ Round | 1 | 2 | 3 | 4 | 5 | 6 | 7 | 8 | 9 | 10 | 11 | 12 | 13 | 14 | 15 | 16 | 17 | 18 | 19 | 20 | 21 | 22 | 23 | 24 | 25 | 26 |
|---|---|---|---|---|---|---|---|---|---|---|---|---|---|---|---|---|---|---|---|---|---|---|---|---|---|---|
| Al Wasl | 7 | 3 | 3 | 3 | 3 | 2 | 1 | 1 | 1 | 1 | 1 | 1 | 1 | 1 | 1 | 1 | 1 | 1 | 1 | 1 | 1 | 1 | 1 | 1 | 1 | 1 |
| Shabab Al Ahli | 1 | 1 | 2 | 2 | 1 | 3 | 2 | 3 | 3 | 2 | 2 | 3 | 3 | 3 | 3 | 3 | 3 | 2 | 2 | 2 | 2 | 2 | 2 | 2 | 2 | 2 |
| Al Ain | 4 | 2 | 1 | 1 | 2 | 1 | 3 | 2 | 2 | 3 | 3 | 2 | 2 | 2 | 2 | 2 | 2 | 3 | 3 | 3 | 3 | 3 | 4 | 3 | 3 | 3 |
| Sharjah | 3 | 9 | 6 | 5 | 5 | 4 | 4 | 5 | 6 | 4 | 4 | 4 | 4 | 4 | 5 | 5 | 5 | 5 | 6 | 6 | 6 | 6 | 6 | 6 | 4 | 4 |
| Al Wahda | 11 | 7 | 5 | 6 | 10 | 6 | 5 | 4 | 4 | 5 | 5 | 5 | 5 | 5 | 4 | 4 | 4 | 4 | 4 | 4 | 4 | 4 | 3 | 4 | 5 | 5 |
| Al Nasr | 13 | 14 | 14 | 12 | 9 | 8 | 10 | 9 | 10 | 12 | 9 | 9 | 9 | 7 | 6 | 6 | 6 | 6 | 5 | 5 | 5 | 5 | 5 | 5 | 6 | 6 |
| Al Bataeh | 6 | 4 | 8 | 11 | 7 | 7 | 7 | 7 | 8 | 6 | 7 | 7 | 7 | 9 | 8 | 8 | 7 | 7 | 7 | 7 | 7 | 8 | 9 | 9 | 7 | 7 |
| Al Jazira | 2 | 6 | 4 | 4 | 4 | 5 | 6 | 8 | 5 | 7 | 6 | 6 | 6 | 6 | 7 | 7 | 8 | 8 | 8 | 8 | 8 | 8 | 8 | 8 | 8 | 8 |
| Ajman | 14 | 12 | 12 | 13 | 13 | 13 | 14 | 12 | 12 | 11 | 11 | 12 | 12 | 12 | 11 | 12 | 11 | 12 | 12 | 11 | 12 | 9 | 7 | 7 | 9 | 9 |
| Baniyas | 9 | 5 | 9 | 8 | 6 | 11 | 8 | 6 | 7 | 8 | 8 | 8 | 8 | 10 | 10 | 10 | 9 | 9 | 10 | 12 | 9 | 10 | 11 | 11 | 10 | 10 |
| Kalba | 8 | 11 | 11 | 10 | 8 | 10 | 11 | 10 | 9 | 9 | 10 | 11 | 11 | 11 | 12 | 11 | 12 | 10 | 9 | 9 | 10 | 11 | 10 | 10 | 11 | 11 |
| Khor Fakkan | 5 | 8 | 10 | 9 | 12 | 9 | 9 | 11 | 11 | 10 | 12 | 10 | 10 | 8 | 9 | 9 | 10 | 11 | 11 | 10 | 11 | 12 | 12 | 12 | 12 | 12 |
| Emirates | 12 | 10 | 7 | 7 | 11 | 12 | 12 | 13 | 13 | 13 | 14 | 14 | 14 | 14 | 14 | 13 | 13 | 13 | 13 | 13 | 13 | 13 | 13 | 13 | 13 | 13 |
| Hatta | 10 | 13 | 13 | 14 | 14 | 14 | 13 | 14 | 14 | 14 | 13 | 13 | 13 | 13 | 13 | 14 | 14 | 14 | 14 | 14 | 14 | 14 | 14 | 14 | 14 | 14 |

Updated to match(es) played on 7 June 2024. Source: UPLeague

=== Top scorers ===
As of 7 June 2024

| Rank | Player | Club | Goals |
|---|---|---|---|
| 1 | (Ba'athist Syria) Omar Khribin | Al Wahda | 19 |
| 2 | (United Arab Emirates) Fábio Lima | Al Wasl | 17 |
| 3 | (Brazil) Igor Jesus | Shabab Al Ahli | 14 |
| 3 | (Israel) Mu'nas Dabbur | Shabab Al Ahli | 14 |
| 5 | (Togo) Kodjo Laba | Al Ain | 12 |
| 5 | (Iran) Mehdi Ghayedi | Ittihad Kalba | 12 |
| 5 | (Morocco) Walid Azaro | Ajman | 12 |
| 8 | (Albania) Taulant Seferi | Baniyas | 11 |
| 8 | (Italy) Manolo Gabbiadini | Al Nasr | 11 |
| 8 | (Switzerland) Haris Seferovic | Al Wasl | 11 |
| 8 | (Brazil) Caio | Sharjah | 11 |
| 12 | (Brazil) Lourency | Khor Fakkan | 10 |
| 12 | (United Arab Emirates) Ali Mabkhout | Al Jazira | 10 |

=== Clean sheets ===
As of 7 June 2024

| Rank | Player | Club | Clean sheets |
|---|---|---|---|
| 1 | (United Arab Emirates) Khaled Al-Senani | Al Wasl | 10 |
| 2 | (United Arab Emirates) Ahmed Shambih | Al Nasr | 6 |
| 3 | (United Arab Emirates) Khalid Eisa | Al Ain | 5 |
| 4 | (United Arab Emirates) Rashed Ali | Al Wahda | 4 |
| 4 | (United Arab Emirates) Ali Al-Hosani | Ajman | 4 |
| 5 | (United Arab Emirates) Suhail Abdulla | Emirates | 3 |
| 5 | (United Arab Emirates) Fahad Al-Dhanhani | Baniyas | 3 |
| 5 | (United Arab Emirates) Adel Al-Hosani | Sharjah | 3 |
| 5 | (United Arab Emirates) Ibrahim Essa | Al Bataeh | 3 |
| 5 | (United Arab Emirates) Hassan Hamza | Shabab Al Ahli | 3 |
| 5 | (United Arab Emirates) Salem Khairi | Hatta | 3 |
| 5 | (United Arab Emirates) Ali Khasif | Al Jazira | 3 |

=== Hat tricks ===
| Player | For | Against | Result | Date | Round |
|---|---|---|---|---|---|
| (Morocco) Walid Azaro | Ajman | Ittihad Kalba | 3–5 (H) | 29 September 2023 | 4 |
| (Brazil) Lourency | Khor Fakkan | Al Wahda | 3–2 (H) | 29 December 2023 | 12 |
| (Morocco) Soufiane Rahimi | Al Ain | Ajman | 4–0 (A) | 15 March 2024 | 16 |
| (Morocco) Walid Azaro^{4} | Ajman | Ittihad Kalba | 4–2 (A) | 29 March 2024 | 17 |
| (Israel) Mu'nas Dabbur | Shabab Al Ahli | Hatta | 10–0 (H) | 2 June 2024 | 26 |

Notes

^{4} Player scored 4 goals
(H) – Home team
(A) – Away team
