= Saeed Rashed =

Emirati association football player (born 1988)

Saeed Rashed سعيد راشد
Personal information
- Full name: Saeed Rashed Ali Al-Mesmari
- Date of birth: 28 October 1988 (age 38)
- Place of birth: Emirates
- Height: 1.64 m (5 ft 5 in)
- Position: Midfielder

Youth career
- 2003-2007: Al-Fujairah

Senior career*
Years	Team	Apps	(Gls)
2007-2018	Al-Fujairah		
2018–2019	Dibba Al-Fujairah		
2019	Al Urooba		
2019–2021	Al Bataeh		
2021–2022	Dibba Al-Hisn		
2022–2023	Emirates		
2023–2024	Masafi		
- * Club domestic league appearances and goals

Saeed Rashed (Arabic:سعيد راشد) (born 28 October 1988) is an Emirati footballer. He currently plays as a midfielder.

== Career ==
He formerly played for Al-Fujairah, Dibba Al-Fujairah, Al Urooba, Al Bataeh, and Dibba Al-Hisn.
