= Diogo Acosta =

Brazilian footballer (born 1990)

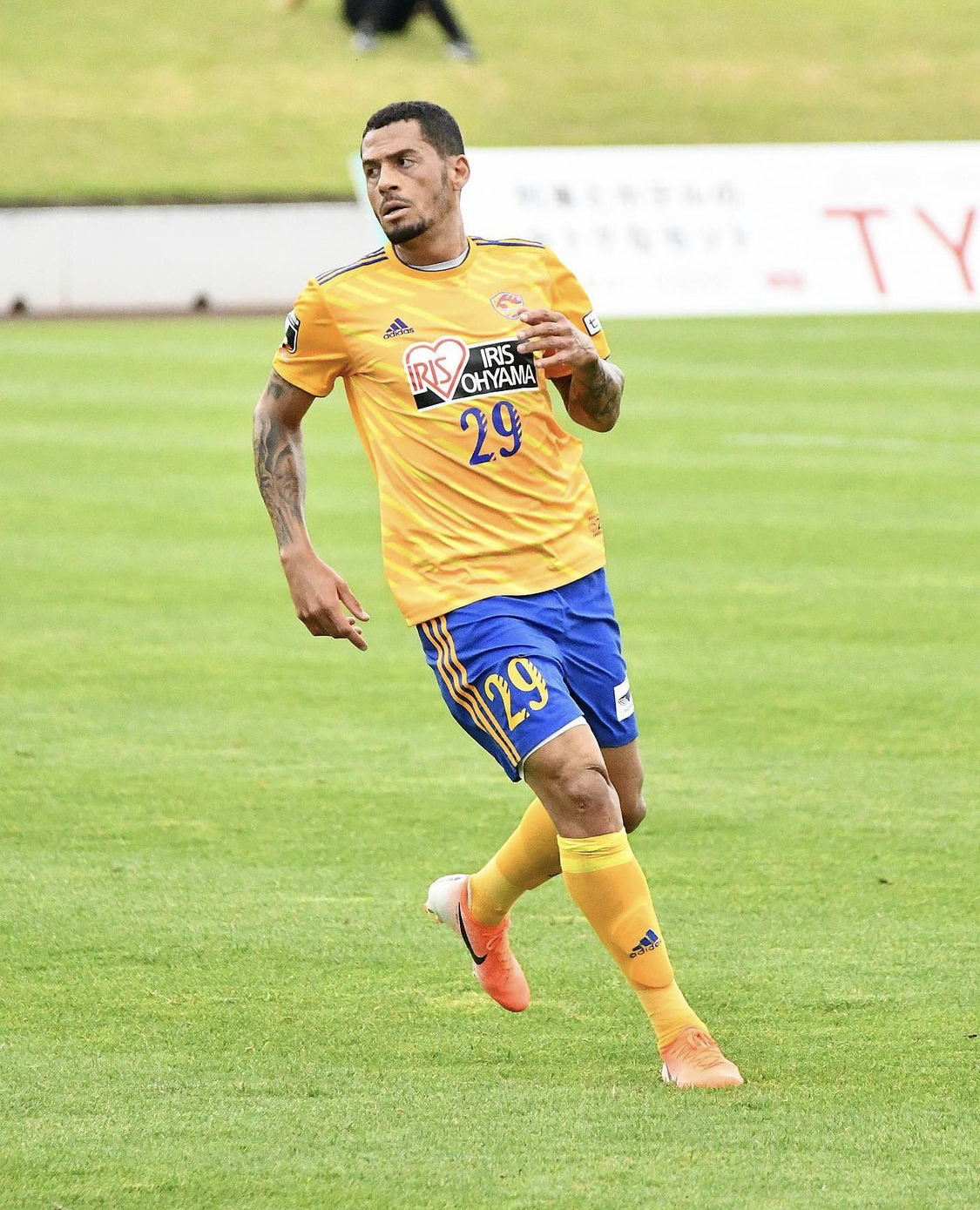

Personal information
- Full name: Diogo da Silva Farias
- Date of birth: 13 June 1990 (age 36)
- Place of birth: Três Corações, Brazil
- Height: 1.85 m (6 ft 1 in)
- Position: Forward

Team information
- Current team: Al-Hamriyah
- Number: 90

Youth career
- São Bernardo

Senior career*
Years	Team	Apps	(Gls)
2009–2010	Palmeiras B	24	(8)
2010–2014	São Bernardo	17	(1)
2012	→ Comercial-SP (loan)	8	(2)
2012	→ Avaí (loan)	30	(5)
2013	→ Incheon United (loan)	32	(7)
2014	→ Oeste (loan)	7	(2)
2014	→ Incheon United (loan)	11	(1)
2015	São Caetano	16	(13)
2015–2018	Étoile du Sahel	47	(20)
2018	Dibba	10	(4)
2018–2019	Al-Khor	13	(2)
2019	Dibba	12	(7)
2019	Vegalta Sendai	1	(0)
2020–2021	Emirates	26	(26)
2021–2022	Dibba	24	(27)
2022–2023	Emirates	32	(24)
2023–2024	Al Dhafra	9	(5)
2024–2025	Dibba	13	(9)
2025–	Al-Hamriyah	0	(0)
- * Club domestic league appearances and goals as of 11:35, 26 January 2025 (UTC)

Diogo da Silva Farias (born 13 June 1990), also known as Diogo Acosta, is a Brazilian footballer who plays for Al-Hamriyah as a forward.

== Career ==
Incheon United signed him in January 2013. During the 2013 season, he has scored 7 goals in 32 games. He rejoined in 2014 on loan. He joined the Tunisian football club Étoile Sportive du Sahel during the 2015 summer transfer window on a three-year contract.

In the Summer of 2019, he joined J League side Vegalta Sendai.

== Club career statistics ==
Club	Season	Division	League		National Cup		Continental		League Cup		Total	
Club	Season	Division	Apps	Goals	Apps	Goals	Apps	Goals	Apps	Goals	Apps	Goals
Palmeiras B	2010	PA3	24	8	0	0	0	0	0	0	24	8
São Bernardo	2011	CP	6	0	0	0	0	0	0	0	6	0
São Bernardo	2014	CP	6	0	0	0	0	0	0	0	6	0
São Bernardo	2012	PA2	5	1	0	0	0	0	0	0	5	1
São Bernardo	Total		17	1	0	0	0	0	0	0	17	1
Comercial	2012	CP	8	2	0	0	0	0	0	0	8	2
Avaí	2012	Série B	30	5	0	0	0	0	0	0	30	5
Oeste	2014	Série B	7	2	0	0	0	0	0	0	7	2
Incheon United	2013	K League 1	32	7	0	0	0	0	0	0	32	7
Incheon United	2014	K League 1	11	1	0	0	0	0	0	0	11	1
Incheon United	Total		43	8	0	0	0	0	0	0	43	8
São Caetano	2015	PA2	16	13	0	0	0	0	0	0	16	13
ESS	2015–16	TLP1	20	9	2	1	9	2	0	0	31	12
ESS	2016–17	TLP1	15	8	0	0	10	0	0	0	25	8
ESS	2017–18	TLP1	12	3	3	2	9	4	0	0	24	9
ESS	Total		47	20	5	3	28	6	0	0	80	29
Al-Khor	2018–19	QSL	13	2	3	1	0	0	0	0	16	3
Dibba Al Fujairah	2017–18	UPL	10	4	2	0	0	0	3	2	15	6
Dibba Al Fujairah	2018–19	UPL	12	7	1	0	0	0	0	0	13	7
Dibba Al Fujairah	2021–22	UD1GA	24	27	4	8	0	0	0	0	31	35
Dibba Al Fujairah	2024–25	UD1GA	13	9	4	0	0	0	0	0	17	9
Dibba Al Fujairah	Total		59	47	11	8	0	0	3	2	73	57
Emirates	2019–20	UD1GA	8	7	0	0	0	0	0	0	8	7
Emirates	2020–21	UD1GA	18	20	7	7	0	0	0	0	25	27
Emirates	2022–23	UD1GA	30	24	2	4	0	0	0	0	32	28
Emirates	2023–24	UPL	2	0	0	0	0	0	1	0	3	0
Emirates	Total		58	51	9	11	0	0	1	0	68	62
Al Dhafra	2023–24	UD1GA	9	5	0	0	0	0	0	0	9	5
Al Dhafra	Total		9	5	0	0	0	0	0	0	9	5
Career total			331	163	24	22	28	6	4	2	391	195

== Honours ==
=== Club ===
Étoile Sportive du Sahel

- Tunisian Ligue : 2015-2016
- Tunisian Cup (1): 2014–15.
- CAF Confederation Cup (1): 2015.
