= Nasser Jumaa =

Emirati footballer (born 1988)

Personal information
- Full name: Nasser Jumaa Khamis
- Date of birth: 24 September 1988 (age 38)
- Place of birth: United Arab Emirates
- Height: 1.71 m (5 ft 7 1/2 in)
- Position: Defender

Youth career
- Al-Sharjah

Senior career*
Years	Team	Apps	(Gls)
2008–2014	Al-Sharjah		
2016–2017	Dibba Al-Fujairah		
2018	Al-Arabi		
2019	Al Hamriyah		
- * Club domestic league appearances and goals

Nasser Jumaa (Arabic: ناصر جمعة; born 24 September 1988) is an Emirati footballer who played in the UAE First Division League as a defender.
