= Matheus da Silva =

Brazilian footballer

Personal information
- Full name: Matheus Avelino da Silva
- Date of birth: 29 December 2000 (age 25)
- Height: 1.68 m (5 ft 6 in)
- Position: Midfielder

Youth career
- –2019: Nacional

Senior career*
Years	Team	Apps	(Gls)
2019–2022	Al-Wasl	5	(1)
2020	→ Al-Arabi (loan)		
2021	→ Al-Arabi (loan)		
2021–2022	→ Dibba Al-Hisn (loan)		
2022–2023	Al-Arabi		
- * Club domestic league appearances and goals as of 17:17, 26 October 2019 (UTC)

Matheus Avelino da Silva (born 29 December 2000) is a Brazilian footballer who plays as a midfielder.

== Career statistics ==
=== Club ===
As of 26 October 2019.

Club	Season	League			Cup		Continental		Other		Total	
Club	Season	Division	Apps	Goals	Apps	Goals	Apps	Goals	Apps	Goals	Apps	Goals
Al-Wasl	2018–19	UAE Pro League	5	1	0	0	0	0	0	0	5	1
Al-Wasl	2019–20	UAE Pro League	0	0	0	0	0	0	0	0	0	0
Al-Wasl	Total		5	1	0	0	0	0	0	0	5	1
Al-Arabi (loan)	2019–20	UAE Division 1	0	0	0	0	0	0	0	0	0	0
Career total			5	1	0	0	0	0	0	0	5	1
