= Khalifa Al-Shahyary =

Emirati association football player (born 1989)

Khalifa Al-Shahyary خليفة الشهياري
Personal information
- Full name: Khalifa Salem Mohammed Al-Shahyary
- Date of birth: 29 December 1989 (age 36)
- Place of birth: Emirates
- Height: 1.76 m (5 ft 9 in)
- Position: Left-back

Senior career*
Years	Team	Apps	(Gls)
2010–2013	Masafi		
2013–2016	Al Urooba		
2016–2019	Dibba Al-Fujairah	19	(2)
2020–2021	Dibba Al-Fujairah		
2021–2022	Masafi		
- * Club domestic league appearances and goals

Khalifa Al-Shahyary (Arabic:خليفة الشهياري) (born 29 December 1989) is an Emirati footballer. He currently plays as a left back .

== Career ==
He formerly played for Masafi, and Al Urooba.

=== Dibba Al-Fujairah ===
On Season 2016, signed with Dibba Al-Fujairah . On 16 September 2016, Al-Shahyary made his professional debut for Dibba Al-Fujairah against Ittihad Kalba in the Pro League . landed with Dibba Al-Fujairah from the UAE Pro League to the UAE First Division League in 2018-19 season, he left the team after landing and came back and signed with Dibba Al-Fujairah on 11 June 2020.
