= Khalil Al Ali =

Emirati footballer (born 1984)

Personal information
- Full name: Khalil Abdullah Al Ali
- Date of birth: 21 December 1984 (age 41)
- Place of birth: United Arab Emirates
- Height: 1.74 m (5 ft 8 1/2 in)
- Position: Defender

Senior career*
Years	Team	Apps	(Gls)
2005–2008	Al Jazirah Al Hamra		
2008–2009	Al Rams		
2019–2011	Emirates		
2011–2012	Masafi		
2012–2014	Dibba Al-Fujairah		
2014–2017	Al Dhafra		
2017–2018	Ittihad Kalba		
- * Club domestic league appearances and goals

Khalil Al Ali (Arabic:خليل آل علي) (born 21 December 1984) is an Emirati footballer who played as a defender.
