= Abdullah Nini =

Emirati footballer (born 1990)

Personal information
- Full name: Abdullah Nini Jumaa Al-Shehhi
- Date of birth: 6 July 1990 (age 36)
- Place of birth: United Arab Emirates
- Height: 1.77 m (5 ft 9 1/2 in)
- Position: Defender

Youth career
- 2009–2011: Ras Al Khaimah
- 2011: Emirates

Senior career*
Years	Team	Apps	(Gls)
2011–2017	Emirates	40	(2)
2017–2018	Al Hamriyah	0	(0)
2018–2019	Dibba Al-Hisn	3	(0)
2019–2020	Al Arabi	5	(0)
2020–2022	Al Taawon	37	(0)
2022–2023	Al Rams	26	(0)
- * Club domestic league appearances and goals

Abdullah Nini Al-Shehhi (Arabic:عبد الله نيني الشحي) (born 6 July 1990) is an Emirati footballer who plays as a defender.
