= Salem Al-Eedi =

Emirati association football player (born 1994)

Salem Al-Eedi سالم العيدي
Personal information
- Full name: Salem Rashed Juma Al-Eedi
- Date of birth: 24 June 1994 (age 32)
- Place of birth: Sharjah, United Arab Emirates
- Height: 1.77 m (5 ft 10 in)
- Position: Defender

Youth career
- 2010–2011: Ajman
- 2011–2017: Al-Jazira

Senior career*
Years	Team	Apps	(Gls)
2018–2022	Al-Jazira	18	(0)
2020–2021	→ Khor Fakkan (loan)	6	(0)
2021–2022	→ Emirates (loan)	14	(0)
2022–2023	Al Urooba	16	(0)
2023–2024	Al Arabi		
- * Club domestic league appearances and goals

Salem Al-Eedi (Arabic:سالم العيدي) (born 24 June 1994) is an Emirati footballer who plays as a defender.

== Career ==
Al-Eedi started his career at Al-Jazira and is a product of the Al-Jazira's youth system Where he moved to him from Ajman's youth in 2011 . On 22 September 2017, Al-Eedi made his professional debut for Al-Jazira against Dibba Al-Fujairah in the Pro League.
