= Mohammed Al-Khodaim =

Emirati footballer (born 1989)

Personal information
- Full name: Mohammed Ahmed Rasheed Khamis Al-Khodaim
- Date of birth: 3 June 1989 (age 37)
- Place of birth: United Arab Emirates
- Height: 1.71 m (5 ft 7 1/2 in)
- Position: Midfielder

Youth career
- Dibba Al-Fujairah

Senior career*
Years	Team	Apps	(Gls)
2009–2013	Dibba Al-Fujairah		
2013–2015	Ajman		
2015–2016	Ittihad Kalba		
2016–2017	Dibba Al-Fujairah		
2017–2020	Ajman		
2021	Al-Taawon		
2021–2022	Masafi		
- * Club domestic league appearances and goals

Mohammed Al-Khodaim (Arabic:محمد الخديم) (born 3 June 1989) is an Emirati footballer. He currently plays as a midfielder.
