= Marwan Mohammed =

Emirati footballer (born 1994)

Personal information
- Full name: Marwan Mohammed Darwish
- Date of birth: 8 January 1994 (age 32)
- Place of birth: United Arab Emirates
- Height: 1.64 m (5 ft 4 1/2 in)
- Position: Left back

Youth career
- Al Shabab

Senior career*
Years	Team	Apps	(Gls)
2014–2017	Al Shabab		
2017–2019	Emirates Club		
2019	Hatta		
2021–2022	Al-Arabi		
2022–2024	Al Dhaid		
- * Club domestic league appearances and goals

Marwan Mohammed (Arabic:مروان محمد) (born 8 January 1994) is an Emirati footballer. He currently plays as a left back, most recently for Hatta.
