= Faisel Al-Khodaim =

Emirati footballer (born 1988)

Personal information
- Full name: Faisel Ahmed Al-Khodaim
- Date of birth: 18 August 1988 (age 38)
- Place of birth: United Arab Emirates
- Height: 1.92 m (6 ft 3 1/2 in)
- Position: Midfielder

Youth career
- 2003–2006: Dibba Al-Fujairah

Senior career*
| Years | Team | Apps | (Gls) |
| 2006–2007 | Dibba Al-Fujairah | | |
| 2007–2011 | Al-Wasl | | |
| 2011–2013 | Emirates Club | | |
| 2013–2016 | Dibba Al-Fujairah | | |
| 2016–2019 | Baniyas | | |
| 2019–2020 | Dibba Al-Fujairah | | |
| 2020–2022 | Al-Taawon | | |
| 2022–2024 | Al Arabi | | |
- * Club domestic league appearances and goals

Faisel Al-Khodaim (Arabic:فيصل الخديم) (born 18 August 1988) is an Emirati footballer. He currently plays as a midfielder.
