= Mahmoud Qassem =

Emirati footballer (born 1987)

Personal information
- Full name: Mahmoud Qassem Jumaa
- Date of birth: 8 September 1987 (age 39)
- Place of birth: Dubai, United Arab Emirates
- Height: 1.78 m (5 ft 10 in)
- Position: Full-back

Youth career
- Al-Ahli

Senior career*
Years	Team	Apps	(Gls)
2008–2010	Al-Ahli		
2010–2017	Al Shabab	101	(2)
2017–2020	Hatta		
2020–2021	Emirates		
2021–2022	Al Dhaid		
2022–2023	Al Hamriyah		
2023	Al Taawon		
- * Club domestic league appearances and goals

Mahmoud Qassem (Arabic: محمود قاسم; born 8 September 1987) is an Emirati footballer who played as a full back.
