= Mohamed Baroot =

Emirati footballer (born 1987)

Mohammed Baroot
Personal information
- Full name: Mohammed Othman Barot Al-Baroudi
- Date of birth: 7 June 1987 (age 39)
- Place of birth: United Arab Emirates
- Height: 1.80 m (5 ft 11 in)
- Position: Goalkeeper

Youth career
- Ittihad Kalba

Senior career*
Years	Team	Apps	(Gls)
2008–2018	Ittihad Kalba		
2018–2019	Dibba Al-Hisn		
2019–2020	Al Bataeh		
2020–2021	Masafi		
2021–2022	Masfout		
- * Club domestic league appearances and goals

Mohammed Baroot (Arabic: محمد باروت) (born 7 June 1987) is an Emirati footballer. He currently plays as a goalkeeper.
