= Ahmed Ibrahim Helal =

Emirati footballer (born 1993)

Ahmed Ibrahim
Personal information
- Full name: Ahmed Ibrahim Helal Al-Dhanhani
- Date of birth: 30 June 1993 (age 33)
- Place of birth: United Arab Emirates
- Height: 1.85 m (6 ft 1 in)
- Position: Midfielder

Team information
- Current team: Emirates
- Number: 88

Youth career
- Dibba Al Fujairah

Senior career*
Years	Team	Apps	(Gls)
2012–2021	Dibba Al Fujairah		
2021–2022	Al Urooba		
2022	Dibba Al Fujairah		
2022–2024	Dibba Al-Hisn		
2024–	Emirates		
- * Club domestic league appearances and goals

Ahmed Ibrahim Helal (Arabic:أحمد إبراهيم هلال) (born 30 June 1993) is an Emirati footballer who plays for Emirates Club as a midfielder.
