= Ali Al-Dhanhani =

Emirati footballer (born 1991)

Personal information
- Full name: Ali Mohammed Khamis Al-Dhanhani
- Date of birth: 1 June 1991 (age 35)
- Place of birth: United Arab Emirates
- Height: 1.70 m (5 ft 7 in)
- Position: Full back

Team information
- Current team: Dibba
- Number: 17

Youth career
- Dibba Al-Fujairah

Senior career*
Years	Team	Apps	(Gls)
2011–2017	Dibba Al-Fujairah	36	(2)
2017–2023	Sharjah	69	(3)
2022–2023	→ Khor Fakkan (loan)	24	(0)
2023–2024	Al Bataeh	8	(0)
2024–2025	Dibba Al-Hisn	19	(0)
2025–	Dibba	0	(0)

International career
2023–	United Arab Emirates	0	(0)
- * Club domestic league appearances and goals

Ali Mohammed Khamis Al-Dhanhani (Arabic: علي الظنحاني; born 1 June 1991) is an Emirati footballer. He currently plays as a full back for Dibba.
