= Fahad Sabeel =

Emirati footballer (born 1989)

Personal information
- Full name: Fahad Sabeel Obaid
- Date of birth: 10 March 1989 (age 37)
- Place of birth: Dubai, United Arab Emirates
- Height: 1.80 m (5 ft 11 in)
- Position: Right-back

Youth career
- Al-Nasr

Senior career*
Years	Team	Apps	(Gls)
2010–2015	Al-Nasr	16	(0)
2012–2013	→ Baniyas (loan)	5	(0)
2015–2016	Al-Shaab	10	(0)
2016–2017	Al Urooba		
2017–2020	Fujairah	31	(1)
2020–2022	Ittihad Kalba	47	(0)
2022–2023	Al Bataeh	10	(0)
2023–2024	Emirates	10	(0)
- * Club domestic league appearances and goals

Fahad Sabeel (Arabic:فهد سبيل) (born 10 March 1989) is an Emirati footballer. He currently plays as a right back.
