= Mohamed Al Rowaihy =

Emirati association football player (born 1985)

Mohamed Al Rowaihy محمد الرويحي
Personal information
- Full name: Mohamed Salem Nasser Al Rowaihy
- Date of birth: 30 September 1985 (age 41)
- Place of birth: Emirates
- Height: 1.80 m (5 ft 11 in)
- Position: Goalkeeper

Team information
- Current team: Dibba
- Number: 12

Youth career
- Dibba

Senior career*
Years	Team	Apps	(Gls)
2007–2014	Dibba		
2014–2016	Al-Fujairah		
2016–	Dibba		
- * Club domestic league appearances and goals

Mohamed Salem Nasser Al Rowaihy (Arabic: محمد الرويحي; born 30 September 1985) is an Emirati footballer. He currently plays as a goalkeeper for Dibba.

== Career ==
Mohamed Al Rowaihy started his career at Dibba and is a product of the Dibba's youth system.

=== Al-Fujairah ===
On 15 May 2014 left Dibba and signed with Al-Fujairah. On 30 November 2014, Al Rowaihy made his professional debut for Al-Fujairah against Baniyas in the Pro League.

=== Dibba Al-Fujairah ===
On 23 May 2016 left Al-Fujairah and he returned to Dibba. On 17 January 2017, Al Rowaihy made his professional debut for Dibba against Emirates Club in the Pro League, replacing Fahad Al-Dhanhani.
