= Mohammed Ibrahim Eid =

Emirati footballer (born 1991)

Mohammed Ibrahim
Personal information
- Full name: Mohammed Ibrahim Eid Al-Zaabi
- Date of birth: 7 August 1991 (age 35)
- Place of birth: United Arab Emirates
- Height: 1.84 m (6 ft 1/2 in)
- Position: Forward

Team information
- Current team: Al Dhaid
- Number: 11

Youth career
- Dubai

Senior career*
Years	Team	Apps	(Gls)
2010–2016	Dubai	45	(3)
2016–2017	Al Shabab	13	(1)
2017–2019	Al-Sharjah	13	(2)
2019–2020	Ajman	9	(0)
2020–2021	Dibba		
2021–2025	Al-Hamriyah		
2025–	Al Dhaid		
- * Club domestic league appearances and goals

Mohammed Ibrahim Eid (Arabic:محمد إبراهيم عيد) (born 7 August 1991) is an Emirati footballer. He currently plays for Al Dhaid.
