= Fidélis (footballer, born 1989) =

Brazilian footballer (born 1989)

Personal information
- Full name: Philipe Fidélis dos Santos
- Date of birth: June 14, 1989 (age 37)
- Place of birth: Contagem, Minas Gerais, Brazil
- Height: 1.85 m (6 ft 1 in)
- Position: Striker

Youth career
- 2006: Cruzeiro
- 2007: PSV
- 2007: Boa Esperança
- 2007: Santa Tereza

Senior career*
Years	Team	Apps	(Gls)
2009–2014	Marítimo	48	(5)
2011–2014	Marítimo B	18	(3)
2014–2017	Portimonense	68	(9)
2016–2017	→ Penafiel (loan)	35	(5)
2017–2018	Ras Al Khaima	18	(9)
2018–2019	Nejmeh	10	(9)
2019	Al-Dhaid	1	(0)
2020–2021	Al-Taawon	15	(12)
2021–	Masafi	6	(0)
- * Club domestic league appearances and goals as of 08:58, 8 March 2022 (UTC)

Philipe Fidélis dos Santos (born 14 June 1989), or simply Fidélis, is a Brazilian professional footballer who plays as a striker for Emirati club Masafi.

== Club career ==
Fidelis scored a memorable goal for Marítimo against English side Newcastle United in the Europa League group stage on 22 November 2012. Coming on in the 59th minute, Fidelis struck the equaliser for Maritimo 20 minutes later. He was unlucky not to score a winner in the last minute and the game ended 1–1.
