= Ibrahim Essa =

Emirati footballer (born 1994)

Personal information
- Full name: Ibrahim Essa Ali Al-Balochi
- Date of birth: 10 April 1994 (age 32)
- Place of birth: United Arab Emirates
- Height: 1.79 m (5 ft 10 1/2 in)
- Position: Goalkeeper

Team information
- Current team: Al Bataeh
- Number: 44

Youth career
- Al-Nasr

Senior career*
Years	Team	Apps	(Gls)
2013–2021	Al-Nasr	23	(0)
2016–2017	→ Ittihad Kalba (loan)	22	(0)
2017–2018	→ Hatta (loan)	2	(0)
2021–2023	Al-Wasl	13	(0)
2022–2023	→ Khor Fakkan (loan)	0	(0)
2023–	Al Bataeh	12	(0)
- * Club domestic league appearances and goals

Ibrahim Essa (Arabic:إبراهيم عيسى) (born 10 April 1994) is an Emirati footballer. He currently plays for Al Bataeh as a goalkeeper for Al-Wasl.
