= Jamal Al Hassani =

Emirati footballer (born 1980)

Personal information
- Full name: Jamal Ali Mohammed Abdulla Al Hassani
- Date of birth: 13 May 1980 (age 46)
- Place of birth: United Arab Emirates

Senior career*
Years	Team	Apps	(Gls)
- Al Dhafra FC

Managerial career
- Al Ain FC (youth)
- 2017: United Arab Emirates U18
- 2019: Baniyas Club (assistant)
- 2020: Masafi Club
- 2021: Al-Lewaa Club
- 2022: Al Hamriyah Club
- 2023–2024: Al Dhaid SC
- * Club domestic league appearances and goals

Jamal Ali Mohammed Abdulla Al Hassani (Arabic: جمال الحساني; born 13 May 1980) is an Emirati football manager and former player who last managed Al Dhaid SC.

== Playing career ==
Al Hassani played for Emirati side Al Dhafra FC. While playing for the club, he scored the first goal in their history and helped them achieve promotion from the second tier to the top flight.

== Managerial career ==
Al Hassani obtained the AFC Professional Coaching Diploma and worked as a youth manager of Emirati side Al Ain FC, helping the youth team win five consecutive league titles. In 2017, he was appointed manager of the United Arab Emirates national under-18 football team. Subsequently, he was appointed as an assistant manager of Emirati side Baniyas Club in 2019, before being appointed manager of Emirati side Masafi Club in 2020.

Following his stint there, he was appointed manager of Saudi Arabian side Al-Lewaa Club in 2021, becoming the first Emirati manager to manage a Saudi Arabian side. While managing the club, Emirati newspaper Al-Bayan wrote that he "has a distinguished training reputation and possesses great abilities and ideas". During his first season with them, he helped them achieve eleventh place in the league. One year later, he was appointed manager of Emirati side Al Hamriyah Club. Two-and-a-half years later, he was appointed manager of Emirati side Al Dhaid SC.
