= Gianluca Muniz =

Brazilian footballer (born 2001)

Personal information
- Full name: Gianluca Muniz Estevam
- Date of birth: 9 May 2001 (age 25)
- Height: 1.85 m (6 ft 1 in)
- Position: Left back

Team information
- Current team: Al Bataeh
- Number: 16

Youth career
- –2019: Cruzeiro
- 2019–2020: Alverca

Senior career*
| Years | Team | Apps | (Gls) |
| 2019–2020 | Alverca B | 1 | (0) |
| 2020–2025 | Al Wahda | 28 | (3) |
| 2021–2022 | → Al Urooba (loan) | 24 | (1) |
| 2023–2024 | → Ajman (loan) | 20 | (1) |
| 2025– | Al Bataeh | 1 | (0) |
- * Club domestic league appearances and goals as of 15:13, 10 August 2021 (UTC)

Gianluca Muniz Estevam (born 9 May 2001), sometimes known as Gian, is a Brazilian footballer who plays for Al Bataeh.

== Career statistics ==
=== Club ===
As of 10 August 2021.

| Club | Season | League | | | Cup | | Continental | | Other | | Total | |
| Club | Season | Division | Apps | Goals | Apps | Goals | Apps | Goals | Apps | Goals | Apps | Goals |
|---|---|---|---|---|---|---|---|---|---|---|---|---|
| Alverca B | 2019–2020 | Porto FA Division of Honour | 1 | 0 | – | | – | | 0 | 0 | 1 | 0 |
| Al Wahda | 2020–21 | UAE Pro League | 18 | 3 | 1 (Note: Appearances in the UAE League Cup) | 0 | 0 | 0 | 0 | 0 | 19 | 3 |
| Al Wahda | 2021–22 | UAE Pro League | 0 | 0 | 0 | 0 | 0 | 0 | 0 | 0 | 0 | 0 |
| Al Wahda | Total | | 18 | 3 | 1 | 0 | 0 | 0 | 0 | 0 | 19 | 3 |
| Al Urooba (loan) | 2021–22 | UAE Pro League | 0 | 0 | 0 | 0 | 0 | 0 | 0 | 0 | 0 | 0 |
| Career total | | | 19 | 3 | 1 | 0 | 0 | 0 | 0 | 0 | 20 | 3 |
