= Ahmed Al-Shaji =

Emirati footballer (born 1986)

Personal information
- Full name: Ahmed Ibrahim Al-Shaji
- Date of birth: 3 May 1986 (age 40)
- Place of birth: United Arab Emirates
- Height: 1.87 m (6 ft 1 1/2 in)
- Position: Goalkeeper

Youth career
- Emirates Club

Senior career*
Years	Team	Apps	(Gls)
2005–2007	Emirates Club		
2007–2008	Al Jazirah Al-Hamra		
2008–2009	Ras Al Khaima		
2009–2019	Emirates Club		
2019–2025	Al-Hamriyah		
- * Club domestic league appearances and goals

Ahmed Al-Shaji (Arabic: أحمد الشاجي; born 3 May 1986) is an Emirati footballer. He currently plays as a goalkeeper.
