= Abdullah Mesfer =

Emirati professional football manager (born 1962)

Personal information
- Full name: Abdullah Ahmed Khalfan Mesfer
- Date of birth: 28 January 1962 (age 64)
- Place of birth: Abu Dhabi, United Arab Emirates

Managerial career
- Years: Team
- 2000: United Arab Emirates (interim)
- 2008–2009: United Arab Emirates (assistant)
- 2011–2012: United Arab Emirates
- 2012–2013: Dibba Al Fujairah
- 2013–2014: Al Dhafra
- 2014: United Arab Emirates U19
- 2015: United Arab Emirates U23
- 2015–2016: Baniyas
- 2016–2017: Jordan
- 2019: Fujairah (interim)
- 2021: Al Bataeh
- 2022–2023: Hatta
- 2023: Al Dhafra

Abdullah Ahmed Khalfan Mesfer (born 28 January 1962) is an Emirati professional football manager.

== Career ==
In 2000 and from 2011 to 2012 he coached United Arab Emirates national football team. Later he trained the Dibba Al Fujairah and Al Dhafra. In 2014 he led the United Arab Emirates U19.
