= Ghazi Ghrairi =

Tunisian football manager

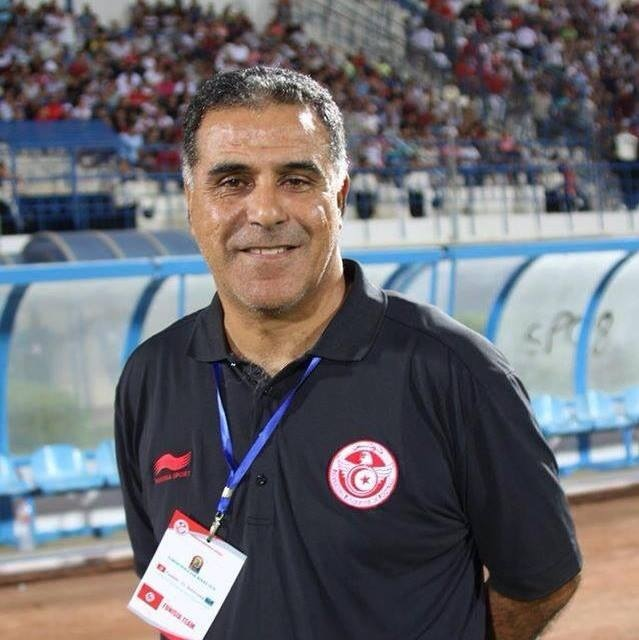

Personal information
- Full name: Ghazi Ghrairi
- Date of birth: 27 August 1965 (age 61)
- Place of birth: Sfax, Tunisia
- Height: 1.79 m (5 ft 10 in)

Team information
- Current team: Al-Arabi (manager)

Managerial career
- Years: Team
- 2007–2008: Al-Fayha
- 2008–2009: CS Sfaxien
- 2009–2010: Ajman
- 2010–2011: Emirates Club
- 2011–2012: ES Zarzis
- 2012–2013: Stade Tunisien
- 2013–2014: Dibba Al Fujairah
- 2014–2015: CS Sfaxien
- 2015–2016: CA Bizertin
- 2016: Al-Shaab
- 2017–2018: ES Métlaoui
- 2018: CS Sfaxien
- 2021: Stade Tunisien
- 2022: Al-Merrikh
- 2023: Al-Faisaly
- 2024–2025: US Tataouine
- 2025: ES Zarzis
- 2025–: Al-Arabi

Ghazi Ghrairi (Arabic: غازي الغرايري; born 27 August 1965) is a Tunisian football manager. He is the current manager of Saudi Arabian club Al-Arabi.
