= Predrag Stilinović =

Croatian football manager

Personal information
- Date of birth: 21 March 1954 (age 72)
- Place of birth: Rijeka, SR Croatia, SFR Yugoslavia
- Position: Forward

Team information
- Current team: Grobničan (manager)

Senior career*
Years	Team	Apps	(Gls)
1972–1973	WSG Radenthein		
1978–1984	Orijent		

Managerial career
- 1995–1996: Orijent
- 1996: Varteks
- 2000–2001: Rijeka
- 2001–2003: Pomorac Kostrena
- 2003: Marsonia
- 2005–2007: Croatia Sesvete
- 2008–2011: Pomorac Kostrena
- 2018–2020: Al-Arabi
- 2022-: Grobničan
- * Club domestic league appearances and goals

Predrag Stilinović (born 21 March 1954) is a Croatian football manager who manages Grobničan.

== Career ==
In June 2003 he replaced Davor Mladina as NK Marsonia manager. After only seven points in six matches, Mladina replaced Stilinović, only to be sacked in November.

He was later an academy coach at HNK Rijeka before working at Gabriele Volpi's academy in Abuja. From 2018 to 2020 he managed UAE club Al-Arabi.
