= Vinícius Lopes (footballer, born 1988) =

Brazilian footballer

Personal information
- Full name: Vinícius Silva Lopes Souto
- Date of birth: 29 January 1988 (age 38)
- Place of birth: Brasília, Brazil
- Height: 1.84 m (6 ft 0 in)
- Position: Striker

Youth career
- 2007: Cruzeiro

Senior career*
Years	Team	Apps	(Gls)
2008–2010	BK Häcken	69	(9)
2011	Gwangju FC	2	(0)
2011–2015	Al Jahra	96	(52)
2015–2016	Kuwait SC	19	(12)
2016–2017	Al Urooba	27	(15)
2017–2018	Muaither SC	9	(5)
2018–2019	Dibba Al-Hisn	18	(16)
2019–2020	Dibba Al-Fujairah	16	(11)
2020–2021	Al-Arabi	16	(18)
2021–2022	Al Hamriyah	26	(22)
2023	Masafi	10	(9)
- * Club domestic league appearances and goals as of 15 May 2023

Vinícius Silva Lopes Souto (born 29 January 1988), or simply Vinícius Lopes, is a Brazilian professional footballer who plays as striker.

== Career ==
Lopes began his career at Brazilian club Cruzeiro. In January 2008, he left his homeland and moved to Swedish club BK Häcken, where he spent 3 seasons and scored 8 goals in 48 games. On 20 February 2011, Lopes moved to South Korean K-League side Gwangju FC.

In July 2011, Lopes moved to Kuwaiti Premier League side Al Jahra.
