= Mahmoud Hassan (footballer, born 1984) =

Emirati footballer

Personal information
- Full name: Mahmoud Hassan Darwish Al-Bloushi
- Date of birth: 1 July 1984 (age 42)
- Place of birth: United Arab Emirates
- Height: 1.82 m (5 ft 11 1/2 in)
- Position: Defender

Youth career
- Al-Nasr

Senior career*
Years	Team	Apps	(Gls)
2005–2016	Al-Nasr		
2014–2016	→ Emirates Club (loan)		
2016–2019	Hatta		
2019–2020	Dibba Al-Hisn		
2020–2021	Al-Hamriyah		
2021–2022	Dibba Al-Hisn		
2022–2023	Al Rams		
- * Club domestic league appearances and goals

Mahmoud Hassan (Arabic: محمود حسن; born 1 July 1984) is an Emirati footballer. He currently plays as a defender.

Not to be confused with Egyptian footballer Mahmoud Hassan, commonly known as Trézéguet
