= Al Bataeh Club =

Emirati football club

- Full name: Al Bataeh Cultural & Sports Club
- Founded: 2012; 14 years ago
- Ground: Al Bataeh Stadium
- Capacity: 2,000
- Chairman: Saud bin Sultan Al Qasimi
- Head coach: Farhad Majidi
- League: UAE Pro League
- 2024–25: UAE Pro League, 11th
- Website: https://albataehfc.ae/
Home colours	Away colours

Al Bataeh Club is a professional football club from Al Bataeh, Sharjah, United Arab Emirates. The team joined the UAE football league in the 2019–20 season.

== History ==
Founded in 2012, the club started its sporting activities with table tennis and athletics. The football team was established in 2013 as a youth academy and competed in many youth tournaments. In 2019, the club joined the UAE football league system in the UAE First Division League, while its first season was interrupted due to COVID-19 pandemic, it consistently performed well, finishing 3rd in both of their first two seasons. The club would secure promotion in 2021 after finishing second in the 2021–22 season, becoming one of the fastest clubs to get promoted as they only spent three seasons in the second tier.

== Pro-League record ==
Season	Lvl.	Tms.	Pos.	President's Cup	League Cup
2019–20^{a}	2	11	3rd	Round of 16	—
2020–21	2	11	3rd	Preliminary Round	—
2021–22	2	15	2nd	Preliminary Round	—
2022–23	1	14	12th	Quarter-Finals	First Round
2023–24	1	14	7th	Round of 16	First Round

_{Notes 2019–20 UAE football season was cancelled due to the COVID-19 pandemic in the United Arab Emirates.}

Key

- Pos. = Position
- Tms. = Number of teams
- Lvl. = League

== Players ==
As of UAE First Division League:

Note: Flags indicate national team as defined under FIFA eligibility rules; some limited exceptions apply. Players may hold more than one non-FIFA nationality.

No.	Pos.	Nation	Player
4	DF	BRA	Ruan Santos
8	MF	BRA	Ivonei
9	FW	UAE	Álvaro
16	DF	BRA	Gianluca Muniz
17	GK	UAE	Ahmed Sulaiman
18	FW	UAE	Abdallah Saleh
21	GK	UAE	Humood Howaij
22	MF	SYR	Ibrahim Amjad
24	MF	UAE	Eisa Marwan
26	DF	UAE	Abdulaziz Haikal
27	DF	UAE	Salem Hassan
31	MF	UAE	Saud Khalil

No.	Pos.	Nation	Player
32	FW	ARG	Luca Druille
35	DF	MLI	Konaté Bandiougou
37	DF	UAE	Rashed Muhayer
45	DF	UAE	Saeed Juma
50	DF	UAE	Saeed Suleiman
70	FW	FRA	Sekou Lega
78	FW	UAE	Hareth Saeed
90	MF	SDN	Hassan Awad
96	GK	UAE	Mohamed Yousif
—	DF	UAE	Abdullah Al-Hammadi
—	MF	BRA	Andrigo
—	FW	UAE	Ali Sangour
—	FW	UAE	Mohammed Al-Hammadi
—	FW	UAE	Mohammed Ibrahim

Players with Multiple Nationalities

- (United Arab Emirates) (Brazil) Álvaro

== Coaching staff ==
Position	Name
Head coach	(Iran) Farhad Majidi
Assistant coach	(Italy) Gabriele Pin (Iran) Farzad Majidi (Iran) Saleh Mostafavi
Goalkeeper coach	(United Arab Emirates) Saoud Al-Hosani
Fitness coach	(Iran) Alireza Rabbani
Match analyst	(United Arab Emirates) Mahmood Al-Hashmi
Sporting director	(Qatar) Hussein Yasser

== Managerial history ==
^{*} Served as caretaker coach.

Name	Nat.	From	To	Ref.
Tareq Al Sayed	(Egypt)	October 2019	June 2020	
Giovanni Tedesco	(Italy)	October 2020	November 2020	
Saeed Shakhit*	(Morocco)	November 2020	November 2020	
Noureddine Abidi	(Tunisia)	November 2020	February 2021	
Abdullah Mesfer	(United Arab Emirates)	March 2021	May 2021	
Tarek Hadhiri	(Tunisia)	May 2021	May 2022	
Caio Zanardi	(Brazil)	May 2022	November 2022	
Saeed Shakhit*	(Morocco)	November 2022	May 2023	
Mirel Rădoi	(Romania)	May 2023	December 2023	
Goran Tomić	(Croatia)	January 2024	January 2025	
Farhad Majidi	(Iran)	January 2025	present	

== See also ==
- List of football clubs in the United Arab Emirates
