= Al Bataeh =

Al Bataeh البطائح
- Municipalities in the Emirate of Sharjah

- Location within United Arab Emirates Location within Middle East Location within Asia
- Coordinates: 25°16′19″N 55°44′11″E
- Town: United Arab Emirates
- Emirate: Sharjah

Population (2015)
  - Total: 6,000

Al Bataeh (Arabic: البطائح, romanized: Al-Baṭāʾiḥ) is a town located in outskirts of the Emirate of Sharjah, the United Arab Emirates. The town only has a population of almost 4,000 as of 2015, and is one of the least populated municipalities of Sharjah. The town is home to Al Bataeh Club and Sharjah Desert Park.
