= Hamdan Bin Rashid Stadium =

Multi-purpose stadium in Hatta, United Arab Emirates

Coordinates: 24°48′16.3″N 56°06′45.4″E

Hamdan bin Rashid Stadium (Arabic: استاد حمدان بن راشد) is a multi-purpose stadium in Hatta, United Arab Emirates. It is currently used mostly for football matches and is the home ground of Hatta Club. The stadium capacity is 5,141.
