= Al Jeer =

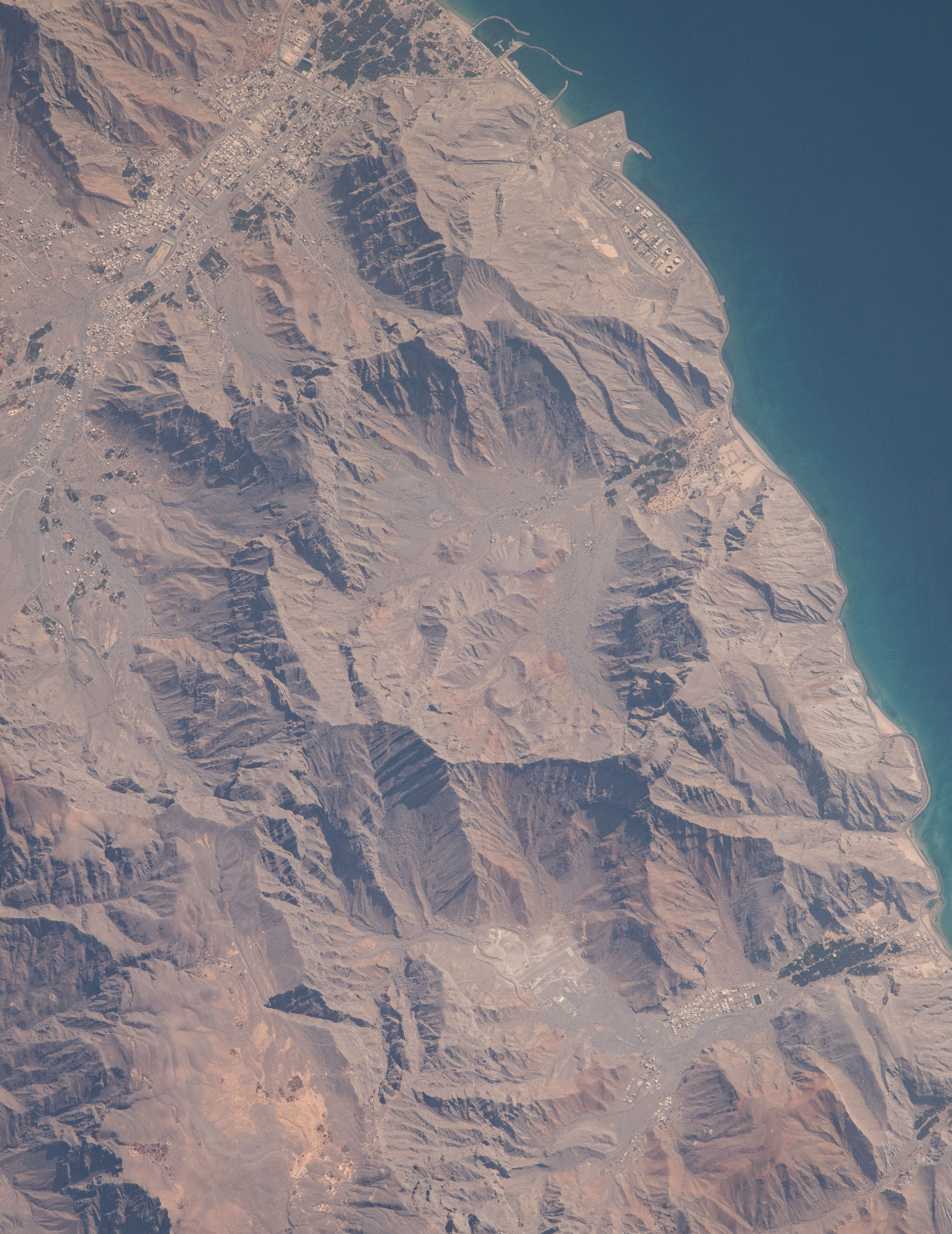

- Location within United Arab Emirates
- Coordinates: 26°2′11″N 56°5′52″E
- Country: United Arab Emirates
- Emirate: Ras Al Khaimah
- Elevation: 180 m (590 ft)

Population
  - Total: 5,111

Al Jeer is a settlement in Northern Ras Al Khaimah, in the United Arab Emirates (UAE). Once a sleepy village, Al Jeer today is a major port and marina and a busy thoroughfare between the UAE and the Omani exclave of Musandam.

== Al Jeer Port ==
The port at Al Jeer operates both as a commercial port and as a yacht club and marina. The Barasti Sailing Club is based at the Marina and is accredited by the Royal Yachting Association (RYA). The clubhouse is fully licensed and leisure facilities include an outdoor education centre, which can accommodate groups of up to 100, including overnight stays.

The commercial port specialises in livestock shipping and includes quarantine facilities.

== Haunting ==
A series of stories in local newspapers highlighted the supposed haunting of a cave near Al Jeer, which had apparently caused some 50 local families to leave their houses in fear. It is believed that anyone who enters the cave 'will end up in Oman'.
