= UAE First Division League =

- Founded: 1974; 52 years ago
- Country: United Arab Emirates
- Confederation: AFC
- Number of clubs: 14
- Level on pyramid: 2
- Promotion to: UAE Pro League
- Relegation to: UAE Second Division League
- Domestic cup: President's Cup
- International cup: AFC Champions League (via cups)
- Current champions: Hatta (3rd title) (2025–26)
- Most championships: Ittihad Kalba (7 titles)
- Broadcaster: Sharjah Sports
- Current: 2026–27 UAE First Division League

UAE First Division League is the second tier of football league competition in the United Arab Emirates.

As of 2020–21, the league features 15 sides who play each other in a home and away round-robin format, with a total of 28 games for each team. The top two sides gain promotion to the UAE Pro-League. On 29 May 2019, UAEFA announced that a UAE Second Division League to be established with smaller clubs, privately owned clubs, football academies with semi-professional teams compete for promotion to UAE Division one. On 6 July 2022, UAEFA announced that the number of participants will increase to 17 teams for the 2022–23 season. An increase of 2 teams, promoted from the UAE Second Division, and no relegation for UAE First Division clubs from the 2021–22 season, in an expansion season.

The league is growing in prominence since its inclusion of privately owned teams promoted from the UAE Second Division league since the 2021–22 season. The league's popularity has been growing year on year and has begun to attract global names such as Mario Balotelli, Quincy Promes, Douglas Costa, Benik Afobe, Leroy Fer, Kurt Zouma and managers such as Andrea Pirlo and most recently Andres Iniesta, amongst many others.

== Current teams ==
As of 2025–26 UAE First Division League

Note: Table lists clubs in alphabetical order.

Club	Home city	Stadium	Capacity
Al-Arabi	Umm Al Quwain	Umm Al Quwain Stadium	3,000
Al Dhaid	Dhaid	Al-Dhaid Stadium	500
Al Hamriyah	Al Hamriyah	Al Hamriya Sports Club Stadium	5,000
Al Ittifaq	Dubai (Al Mamzar)	Various Grounds	???
Al Jazirah Al Hamra	Al Jazirah Al Hamra	Al Hamra Stadium	2,000
Al Orooba	Qidfa / Mirbah	Al Sharqi Stadium	3,000
Dibba Al Hisn	Dibba Al-Hisn	Dibba (H) Stadium	700
Dubai City	Dubai (Al Barsha)	Various Grounds	???
Dubai United	Dubai (Jumeirah)	Dubai British School	100
Emirates	Ras Al Khaimah	Emirates Club Stadium	5,200
Fujairah	Fujairah	Fujairah Club Stadium	10,645
Gulf United	Dubai (Al Jaddaf)	JA Sports & Shooting Club Stadium	1,000
Hatta	Hatta	Hamdan Bin Rashid Stadium	5,000
Majd	Sweihan	Tahnoun bin Mohammed Stadium	15,000
Masfout	Masfout	Masfout Club Stadium	3,000

== List of champions ==
- 1974–75: Al-Shabab
- 1975–76: Al Rams
- 1976–77: Al-Wahda
- 1977–78: Oman Club
- 1978–79: Khor Fakkan Club
- 1979–80: Ittihad Kalba
- 1980–81: Al Rams
- 1981–82: Al Khaleej
- 1982–83: Al-Jazira
- 1983–84: Al Qadsia Club
- 1984–85: Al-Wahda
- 1985–86: Fujairah
- 1986–87: Ras Al Khaima
- 1987–88: Al-Jazira
- 1988–89: Ittihad Kalba
- 1989–90: Fujairah
- 1990–91: Not completed due to Gulf War
- 1991–92: Al Urooba
- 1992–93: Al-Shaab
- 1993–94: Al Khaleej
- 1994–95: Baniyas
- 1995–96: Ittihad Kalba
- 1996–97: Emirates
- 1997–98: Al-Shaab
- 1998–99: Ittihad Kalba
- 1999–00: Sharjah
- 2000–01: Al Khaleej
- 2001–02: Al-Dhafra
- 2002–03: Emirates
- 2003–04: Dubai
- 2004–05: Baniyas
- 2005–06: Fujairah
- 2006–07: Al-Dhafra
- 2007–08: Al Khaleej
- 2008–09: Baniyas
- 2009–10: Ittihad Kalba
- 2010–11: Ajman
- 2011–12: Ittihad Kalba
- 2012–13: Emirates
- 2013–14: Ittihad Kalba
- 2014–15: Dibba Al-Fujairah
- 2015–16: Hatta
- 2016–17: Ajman
- 2017–18: Baniyas
- 2018–19: Khor Fakkan
- 2019–20: Not completed due to COVID-19 pandemic
- 2020–21: Al Urooba
- 2021–22: Dibba Al Fujairah
- 2022–23: Hatta
- 2023–24: Al Urooba
- 2024–25: Al-Dhafra
- 2025–26: Hatta

Al Khaleej was renamed in June 2017 to the match the name of the city Khor Fakkan*

== Champions ==
=== Performance by club ===
Club	Winners	Winning seasons
Kalba	7	1979–80, 1988–89, 1995–96, 1998–99, 2009–10, 2011–12, 2013–14
Khor Fakkan	6	1978–79, 1981–82, 1993–94, 2000–01, 2007–08, 2018–19
Emirates	5	1977–78, 1983–84,1996–97, 2002–03, 2012–13
Baniyas	4	1994–95, 2004–05, 2008–09, 2017–18
Fujairah	3	1985–86, 1989–90, 2005–06
Al Urooba	3	1991–92, 2020–21, 2023–24
Al Dhafra	3	2001–02, 2006–07, 2024–25
Al Rams	2	1975–76, 1980–81
Al Wahda	2	1976–77, 1984–85
Al Jazira	2	1982–83, 1987–88
Al Shaab^{1}	2	1992–93, 1997–98
Ajman	2	2010–11, 2016–17
Dibba Al Fujairah	2	2014–15, 2021–22
Hatta	2	2015–16, 2022–23
Al Shabab^{1}	1	1974–75
Ras Al Khaimah	1	1986–87
Sharjah	1	1999–00
Dubai^{1}	1	2003–04

^{1} Club no longer exists.

=== Performance by city ===
City / Area	Titles	Clubs	Winning seasons
Abu Dhabi	8	Baniyas	(4): 1994–95, 2004–05, 2008–09, 2017–18
Abu Dhabi	8	Al Wahda	(2): 1976–77, 1984–85
Abu Dhabi	8	Al Jazira	(2): 1982–83, 1987–88
Kalba	7	Kalba	(7): 1979–80, 1988–89, 1995–96, 1998–99, 2009–10, 2011–12, 2013–14
Ras Al Khaimah	6	Emirates	(5): 1977–78,1983–84,1996–97, 2002–03, 2012–13
Ras Al Khaimah	6	Ras Al Khaimah	(1): 1986–87
Khor Fakkan	6	Khor Fakkan	(6): 1978–79, 1981–82, 1993–94, 2000–01, 2007–08, 2018–19
Fujairah	3	Fujairah	(3): 1985–86, 1989–90, 2005–06
Sharjah	3	Al Shaab	(2): 1992–93, 1997–98
Sharjah	3	Sharjah	(1): 1999–00
Qidfa / Mirbah	3	Al Urooba	(3): 1991–92, 2020–21, 2023–24
Madinat Zayed	3	Al Dhafra	(3): 2001–02, 2006–07, 2024-25
Dubai	2	Al Shabab	(1): 1974–75
Dubai	2	Dubai	(1): 2003–04
Ar-Rams	2	Al Rams	(2): 1975–76, 1980–81
Ajman	2	Ajman	(2): 2010–11, 2016–17
Dibba Al-Fujairah	2	Dibba Al Fujairah	(2): 2014–15, 2021–22
Hatta	2	Hatta	(2): 2015–16, 2022–23

=== Performance by emirates ===
Emirates	Titles	Clubs	Winning seasons
Sharjah	16	Kalba	(7): 1979–80, 1988–89, 1995–96, 1998–99, 2009–10, 2011–12, 2013–14
Sharjah	16	Khor Fakkan	(6): 1978–79, 1981–82, 1993–94, 2000–01, 2007–08, 2018–19
Sharjah	16	Sharjah	(3): 1999–00, 1992–93, 1997–98
Abu Dhabi	11	Baniyas	(4): 1994–95, 2004–05, 2008–09, 2017–18
Abu Dhabi	11	Al Wahda	(2): 1976–77, 1984–85
Abu Dhabi	11	Al Jazira	(2): 1982–83, 1987–88
Abu Dhabi	11	Al Dhafra	(3): 2001–02, 2006–07, 2024-25
Ras Al Khaimah	8	Emirates	(5): 1977–78,1983–84,1996–97, 2002–03, 2012–13
Ras Al Khaimah	8	Al Rams	(2): 1975–76, 1980–81
Ras Al Khaimah	8	Ras Al Khaimah	(1): 1986–87
Fujairah	8	Fujairah	(3): 1985–86, 1989–90, 2005–06
Fujairah	8	Al Urooba	(3): 1991–92, 2020–21, 2023–24
Fujairah	8	Dibba Al-Fujairah	(2): 2014–15, 2021–22
Dubai	4	Hatta	(2): 2015–16, 2022–23
Dubai	4	Al Shabab	(1): 1974–75
Dubai	4	Dubai	(1): 2003–04
Ajman	2	Ajman	(2): 2010–11, 2016–17

== Top scorers ==
- 1999–2000: (Iraq) Razzaq Farhan (42 goals)
- 2007–08: (Ivory Coast) Modibo Kane Diarra (44 goals) (Record)
- 2008–09: (Morocco) Nabil Daoudi (36 goals)
- 2009–10: (France) Michaël N'dri (10 goals)
- 2010–11: (Brazil) Patrick Fabiano (19 goals)
- 2011–12: (Senegal) Makhete Diop (29 goals)
- 2012–13: (Ivory Coast) Modibo Kane Diarra (24 goals)
- 2013–14: (Ivory Coast) Modibo Kane Diarra (27 goals)
- 2014–15: (France) Michaël N'dri (24 goals)
- 2015–16: (Brazil) Tássio Maia dos Santos (17 goals)
- 2016–17: (Brazil) Adeílson Pereira de Mello (23 goals)
- 2017–18: (Brazil) Marcus Vinícius Araujo Silva (21 goals)
- 2018–19: (Brazil) Vinícius Lopes (16 goals)
- 2019–20: (Brazil) Alex Azeredo (Brazil) Vinícius Lopes (11 goals)
- 2020–21: (Brazil) Diogo Acosta (20 goals)
- 2021–22: (Brazil) Diogo Acosta (27 goals)
- 2022–23: (Brazil) Diogo Acosta (24 goals)
- 2023–24: (Argentina) Marcelo Torres (26 goals)
- 2024–25: (France) Sander Benbachir (21 goals)
