= Al-Taawon (UAE) Club =

UAE Division One association football team from Al jeer, Ras Al Khaimah

Al Taawon
- Full name: Al Taawon Football Club
- Founded: 1999; 26 years ago
- Ground: Mohammed Bin Saud al Qassimi Stadium
- Capacity: 2,000
- Manager: Badr Al Shehhi
- League: UAE First Division League
- 2022–23: 11th
Home colours	Away colours

Al Taawon Club is a football club from Al Jeer, Ras Al Khaimah, United Arab Emirates.

== Notable players ==
Players who played for Al-Taawon with experience of playing for their respective national team:

- (The Gambia) Edrissa Sonko
- (Togo) Euloge Ahodikpe
- (United Arab Emirates) Abdullah Malallah
- (United Arab Emirates) Mubarak Saeed
- (Mauritania) Ablaye Sy
- (Iraq) Muntadher Mohammed

== See also ==
- List of football clubs in the United Arab Emirates
- Category:Al-Taawon (UAE) Club players
