= Masafi Club =

- Full name: Masafi Sports Club
- Founded: 1972; 53 years ago
- Ground: Masafi Stadium, Masafi, Ras Al Khaimah
- Capacity: 2,000
- Chairman: Mohamed Abdullah Al Mehrizi
- Manager: Brahim Boufoud
- League: UAE First Division League
- 2022–23: 7th
Home colours	Away colours

Masafi Sports Club is an Emirati football club based in Masafi. The team currently plays in the UAE First Division League.

== See also ==
- List of football clubs in the United Arab Emirates
