= Emirates Club =

Emirates professional football club

Emirates Club نادي الإمارات
- Full name: Emirates Cultural and Sports Club
- Nickname: The Falcons
- Founded: 1969; 57 years ago
- Ground: Emirates Club Stadium
- Capacity: 4,830
- Owner: Saqr bin Saud bin Saqr Al Qasimi
- Chairman: Yousef Al Batraan
- League: First Division League
- 2023–24: 13th (relegated)
- Website: www.emiratesclub.ae
Home colours	Away colours

Emirates Club (Arabic: نادي الإمارات) is a professional football club based in the city of Ras Al Khaimah, United Arab Emirates. They play in the UAE Pro League after being promoted from the UAE First Division League. They play their home games at the Emirates Club Stadium.

== History ==
=== Establishment ===
The club was established in 1969, from a merger of three local football teams: Al Ittihad, Al Ahly and Al Shaab under the name Oman Club. They were one of the first three teams along with Al Ahli and Al Oruba to play in the UAE league, however they would finish at last place with only 1 point.

In October 1982 the club name was changed to Al Qadsia, Two years later in July 1984 Al Qadsia was merged with Al Taliya and Al Nassr and became the club known today as Emirates Cultural Sport Club.

=== 2010s ===
On 29 May 2011, Sheikh Ahmed bin Saqr al-Qassimi, Sheikh Mohammed bin Kayed Al Qasimi, Chairman of Emirates and Ras Al Khaimah Clubs, announced the merger of the two clubs in one club under the name Emirates Club, To be representative of the Emirate of Ras Al Khaimah. The decision to merge was made according to the recommendation of Sheikh Saud bin Saqr al Qasimi, ruler of Ras Al Khaimah. On 11 June 2011, the new composition of the club was announced.

== Honors ==
- UAE Division One: 6
  - 1977–78, 1983–84, 1996–97, 2002–03, 2012–13, 2019–20
- UAE President Cup: 1
  - 2009–10
- UAE Super Cup: 1
  - 2010

== Season-by-season record ==
Season	Lvl.	Tms.	Pos.	President's Cup	League Cup
2008–09	2	16	2nd	Round of 16	—
2009–10	1	12	11th	Champions	First Round
2010–11	2	8	2nd	Quarter-Finals	—
2011–12	1	12	11th	Round of 16	First Round
2012–13	2	14	1st	Preliminary Round	—
2013–14	1	14	11th	Round of 16	First Round
2014–15	1	14	10th	Round of 16	First Round
2015–16	1	14	12th	Quarter-Finals	First Round
2016–17	1	14	11th	Quarter-Finals	First Round
2017–18	1	12	11th	Round of 16	First Round
2018–19	1	14	13th	Quarter-Finals	Quarter-Finals
2019–20^{a}	2	11	1st	Preliminary Round	—
2020–21	2	11	2nd	Quarter-Finals	—
2021–22	1	14	14th	Round of 16	First Round
2022–23	2	17	2nd	Round of 16	—
2023–24	1	14	13th	Round of 16	First Round

_{Notes 2019–20 UAE football season was cancelled due to the COVID-19 pandemic in the United Arab Emirates.}

== Staff ==
=== Board Members ===
Title	Name
Chairman	(United Arab Emirates) Yousef Abdullah Al Batran
Vice Chairman	(United Arab Emirates) Yousef Ali Al Balushi
Second Vice Chairman	(United Arab Emirates) Khalil Ibrahim Al Taweel
Financial Manager	(United Arab Emirates) Thani Salem Al Shehhi
Youth Supervisor	Vacant
Investment Manager	(United Arab Emirates) Jamal Ahmed Al Qursi
Public Relation Manager	(United Arab Emirates) Adel Muhammad Al Khayal

Last updated: 15 July 2023
Source: Al Bayan

== Current squad ==
As of UAE First Division League:

Note: Flags indicate national team as defined under FIFA eligibility rules; some limited exceptions apply. Players may hold more than one non-FIFA nationality.

No.	Pos.	Nation	Player
2	DF	POR	Diogo Capitão
3	DF	UAE	Abdulrahman Adil
4	DF	UAE	Ahmed Eisa
5	MF	UAE	Sultan Qasem
6	MF	UAE	Hamad Al-Balooshi
7	MF	FRA	Sidi-Hamed Dahmani
8	MF	TUN	Larry Azouni
10	MF	LUX	Lucas Prudhomme
10	MF	UAE	Abdullah Al-Nuaimi
11	MF	UAE	Mohammed Khalil
12	DF	UAE	Rashed Al Zaabi
13	DF	UAE	Faris Khalil
15	MF	CIV	Ange Pierro
16	DF	MAR	Nour Zarkane
17	FW	UAE	Yaqoub Al-Ali

No.	Pos.	Nation	Player
18	DF	UAE	Ali Kareem
21	GK	UAE	Abdullah Al-Marzouqi
22	GK	OMA	Abdulsalam Al-Bloushi
23	DF	UAE	Fahad Sabeel
25	MF	BRA	Leandrinho
27	FW	BRA	Jardel Oliveira
28	FW	UAE	Fahad Badr
30	MF	CMR	Franck Kom
31	MF	SRB	Andrija Radovanović
44	MF	GUI	Ibrahima Cissé
71	GK	UAE	Taresh Al-Qaidi
77	FW	JOR	Baha' Faisal (on loan from Al-Waab)
80	FW	BOL	Darlisom Rodrigues
88	MF	UAE	Ahmed Ibrahim Helal
99	MF	BRA	Lucas Rocha

== Performance in AFC competitions ==
=== AFC Champions League history ===
Season	Round	Club	Home	Away	Aggregate
2011	Group D	(Iran) Zob Ahan	0–1	1–2	3rd
2011	Group D	(Qatar) Al-Rayyan	2–0	0–2	3rd
2011	Group D	(Saudi Arabia) Al-Shabab	2–1	1–4	3rd

=== Record by Country ===
Country	Pld	W	D	L	GF	GA	GD	Win%
Iran	2	0	0	2	1	3	−2	0.00
Qatar	2	1	0	1	2	2	+0	50.00
Saudi Arabia	2	1	0	1	3	5	−2	50.00

== Managerial history ==
^{*} Served as caretaker coach.

Name	Nat.	From	To	Ref.
Khaled Ben Yahia	(Tunisia)		January 2005	
Dragan Gugleta	(Serbia and Montenegro)	January 2005	November 2005	
Reinhard Fabisch	(Germany)	November 2005	November 2006	
Ahmad Al-Ajlani	(Tunisia)	December 2006	2007	
Pintado	(Brazil)	July 2007	December 2007	
Sofiène Hidoussi	(Tunisia)	December 2007	April 2008	
Eid Baroot	(United Arab Emirates)	April 2008	2008	
Shaker Abdel Fattah	(Egypt)	2008	November 2008	
Ebrahim Ghasempour	(Iran)	November 2008	March 2009	
Ahmad Al-Ajlani	(Tunisia)	March 2009	January 2010	
Eid Baroot	(United Arab Emirates)	January 2010	2010	
Ghazi Ghrairi	(Tunisia)	June 2010	December 2011	
Lotfi Benzarti	(Tunisia)	December 2011	2012	
Júnior dos Santos	(Brazil)	October 2012	March 2013	
Sérgio Alexandre	(Brazil)	March 2013	2013	
Eid Baroot	(United Arab Emirates)	June 2013	December 2013	
Paulo Comelli	(Brazil)	December 2013	May 2016	
Theo Bücker	(Germany)	June 2016	December 2016	
Noureddine Abidi*	(Tunisia)	December 2016	December 2016	
Ivan Hašek	(Czech Republic)	December 2016	October 2017	
Noureddine Abidi	(Tunisia)	October 2017	March 2018	
Nizar Mahrous	(Syria)	March 2018	May 2018	
Jalel Kadri	(Tunisia)	June 2018	May 2019	
Eid Baroot	(United Arab Emirates)	June 2019	October 2019	
Gjoko Hadžievski	(North Macedonia)	November 2019	June 2021	
Tarik Sektioui	(Morocco)	July 2021	December 2021	
Ayman El Ramadi	(Egypt)	December 2021	June 2022	
Fathi Labidi	(Tunisia)	June 2022	February 2023	
Mohammed Al Jalboot	(United Arab Emirates)	February 2023	September 2023	
Lluís Planagumà	(Spain)	September 2023	December 2023	
Aaref Al Shehhi*	(United Arab Emirates)	December 2023	January 2024	
Walter Zenga	(Italy)	January 2024	April 2024	
Benito Carbone	(Italy)	April 2024	June 2024	

== See also ==
- List of football clubs in the United Arab Emirates
