= Al-Arabi SC (UAE) =

Association football club in the UAE

Al Arabi (UAE)
- Full name: Al Arabi Cultural Sports Club
- Founded: 1972
- Ground: Umm al Quwain Stadium
- Capacity: 3,000
- Chairman: Ahmad bin Tariq Al Mualla
- Manager: Fouad Boumdal
- League: UAE First Division League
- 2022–23: 6th
Home colours	Away colours

Al-Arabi is a professional football club that is based in the city of Umm Al Quwain. They play in the first Division of the UAE Football League. They were coached by Goran Miscevic.

== Current squad ==
Note: Flags indicate national team as defined under FIFA eligibility rules; some limited exceptions apply. Players may hold more than one non-FIFA nationality.

No.	Pos.	Nation	Player
1	GK	UAE	Ahmed Al-Ameri
3	DF	UAE	Ismael Khaled
4	DF	UAE	Abdullah Jaber
5	MF	BRA	Kleverton
7	MF	MAR	Ahmed Jawar
8	MF	MLI	Youssouf Tolo
9	DF	UAE	Salim Al-Rawahi
11	FW	BRA	Wesley Braga
12	DF	IRI	Hussein Zadeh
16	MF	GAM	Abdou Demba
17	MF	CHA	Annour Sossal
18	MF	PLE	Salim Barake
19	MF	EGY	Mahmoud Mohammed
20	FW	CIV	Cheick Timité
21	MF	CMR	Hanri Nguefack
23	DF	BRA	Gabriel Santanna
24	MF	UAE	Rashed Eisa
25	MF	GAM	Alfusainey Gassama
26	FW	TOG	Faras Darfou
28	MF	COD	Jonathan Kalonga
29	MF	UAE	Hamad Mohammed
30	MF	EGY	Majed El Sayed
32	MF	NGR	Samuel Mallam
33	MF	CIV	Bi Djehe
35	MF	CIV	Moriba Diomande
45	MF	CIV	Benito Sehi

No.	Pos.	Nation	Player
47	DF	CIV	Komlan Nioule
48	MF	GHA	Bernard Abbey
49	MF	MAR	Saad EL Achqar
50	DF	MAR	Hicham Lahjajma
55	GK	UAE	Shehab Al-Baloushi
70	MF	BRA	Gabriel Leite
72	DF	EGY	Ahmed El-Sayed
77	MF	BRA	Renner
80	MF	BRA	Ray Mendonça
81	DF	UAE	Sabeel Jassim
88	MF	GHA	Carlos Mensah
89	MF	CIV	Titi Tahi
90	FW	COL	Juan Alegría
91	FW	COM	Ali Shambih
97	GK	PAK	Hamza Zahed
99	MF	MAR	Ayoub Kaab
—	GK	ALG	Amine Boukemouche
—	DF	UAE	Talal Abdullah
—	DF	EGY	Ahmed Gamal
—	MF	UAE	Majed Al-Azizi
—	MF	JOR	Muaaz Mohammed
—	MF	UAE	Fahad Rashed
—	MF	PLE	Mohammed Eiyad
—	FW	EGY	Abdelrahman Dorgham
—	FW	FRA	Yacine Bentayeb
—	FW	BRA	Régis

== See also ==
- List of football clubs in the United Arab Emirates
