= Dibba FC =

Emirati professional football club

Dibba
- Full name: Dibba Football Club
- Nicknames: Al Nawakhda (النواخذة)
- Founded: 1967; 59 years ago
- Ground: Dibba Stadium
- Capacity: 22,000
- Chairman: Ahmed Saeed Al Dhanhani
- Head coach: Ciprian Panait
- League: UAE Pro League
- 2024–25: UAE Division 1 1st(champion)
- Website: dibbaclub.ae
Home colours	Away colours

Dibba Football Club (Arabic: نادي دبا الرياضي الثقافي) is an Emirati professional football club based in Dibba Al-Fujairah, which competes in the UAE First Division League. Founded in 1967 as Dibba Al Fujairah FC, the club is part of the Dibba Sports and Cultural Club.

== Stadiums ==
Dibba's stadium, Dibba Al Fujairah Stadium, did not meet UAE Pro League requirements so the club had to play its home games in Fujairah Club Stadium during their stay in the top flight. Around 2022, the club completed construction of its own new stadium, Dibba Stadium and played its first match at its new home venue against Shabab Al Ahli in the Pro League.

== Coaching staff ==
Position	Staff
Head coach	(Romania) Ciprian Panait
Assistant coaches	(United Arab Emirates) Mohammed Qasim (United Arab Emirates) Omar Ali-Omar (United Arab Emirates) Osama Al-Haddadi (United Arab Emirates) Saud Rashid
Goalkeepr coaches	(United Arab Emirates) Ghulam Kader (United Arab Emirates) Abdullah Ali Al Marzouqi
Fitness coach	(United Arab Emirates) Mohammed Abdulhussain

== Pro-League record ==
Season	Lvl.	Tms.	Pos.	President's Cup	League Cup
2008–09	2	16	13th	Preliminary Round	—
2009–10	3	8	1st	Preliminary Round	—
2010–11	2	8	3rd	Round of 16	—
2011–12	2	8	2nd	Preliminary Round	—
2012–13	1	14	13th	Quarter-Finals	First Round
2013–14	2	13	3rd	Preliminary Round	—
2014–15	2	11	1st	Round of 16	—
2015–16	1	14	10th	Round of 16	First Round
2016–17	1	14	12th	Round of 16	First Round
2017–18	1	12	9th	Quarter-Finals	Semi-Finals
2018–19	1	14	14th	Quarter-Finals	First Round
2019–20^{a}	2	11	5th	Preliminary Round	—
2020–21	2	11	4th	Preliminary Round	—
2021–22	2	15	1st	Preliminary Round	—
2022–23	1	14	13th	Preliminary Round	First Round

_{Notes 2019–20 UAE football season was cancelled due to the COVID-19 pandemic in the United Arab Emirates.}

Key

- Pos. = Position
- Tms. = Number of teams
- Lvl. = League

== Players ==
As of UAE First Division League:

Note: Flags indicate national team as defined under FIFA eligibility rules; some limited exceptions apply. Players may hold more than one non-FIFA nationality.

No.	Pos.	Nation	Player
3	DF	UAE	Mayed Al-Teneiji
5	DF	UAE	Rashed Mohamed
6	DF	UAE	Habib Yousuf
12	GK	UAE	Mohamed Al Rowaihy
13	DF	UAE	Abdulla Saeed
16	MF	UAE	Sultan Al-Hefeiti
17	DF	UAE	Ali Al-Dhanhani
19	FW	GNB	Midana Cassamá
20	MF	ZIM	Tafadzwa Dhliwayo
21	MF	UAE	Abdallah Sultan
29	MF	UAE	Rashed Nasser
49	DF	UAE	Rashed Al-Khodaim
51	MF	UAE	Khaled Al-Saleh
52	FW	SEN	Mame Gning
56	DF	UAE	Ayed Khamis
59	MF	UAE	Zayed Al-Dhanhani
66	DF	BRA	Diego Ferreira

No.	Pos.	Nation	Player
77	MF	BRA	Saymon Cabral
81	MF	UAE	Ahmed Al Ali
88	MF	UAE	Waleed Hussain
96	DF	BRA	Gilmário Vitor
99	FW	NGA	Elijah Benedict
—	GK	UAE	Sulaiman Al-Hosani
—	DF	BRA	Lucas Galvão
—	DF	JOR	Obada Al Hamaida
—	DF	BRA	Pedro Moraes
—	MF	BRA	Guilherme Castro
—	MF	BRA	Edmundo Appolinario
—	MF	ALB	Xhonatan Lajthia
—	FW	ARG	Nicolás Clemente
—	FW	CGO	Davarel Mouandza
—	FW	MLI	Alhassane Tamboura
—	FW	COL	Jhon Montaño
—	FW	UAE	Eisa Khalfan

Players with Multiple Nationalities

- (United Arab Emirates) (Zimbabwe) Tafadzwa Dhliwayo

== Honours ==
- UAE Division One
  - Champions (2): 2014–15, 2021–22

== See also ==
- List of football clubs in the United Arab Emirates
