= 2023–24 UAE Division 1 =

UAE Division One
- Season: 2023–24
- Dates: 9 September 2023 – 30 May 2024
- Champions: Al Urooba (3rd title)
- Promoted: Al Urooba; Dibba Al Hisn
- Top goalscorer: Marcelo Torres (26 goals)

2023–24 UAE Division One is the 47th Division one season. This season saw the first time two teams got relegated to the 3rd tier as Al Fursan and Baynounah got relegated a season after promotion.

== Team changes ==
=== To Division 1 ===
Relegated from UAE Pro League

- Al Dhafra
- Dibba Al Fujairah

Promoted from UAE Division 2

- Gulf United
- Dubai United

=== From Division 1 ===
Promoted to UAE Pro League

- Emirates
- Hatta

Relegated to UAE Division 2

- Al Fursan
- Baynounah

== Stadia and locations ==
Locations of teams in the UAE Division One

Note: Table lists clubs in alphabetical order.

Club	Home city	Stadium	Capacity
Al Arabi	Umm Al Quwain	Umm Al Quwain Stadium	3,000
Al Dhafra	Madinat Zayed	Al Dhafra Stadium	5,020
Al Dhaid	Dhaid	Al-Dhaid Stadium	500
Al Hamriyah	Al Hamriyah	Al Hamriya Sports Club Stadium	5,000
Al Jazirah Al Hamra	Al Jazirah Al Hamra	Al Hamra Stadium	2,000
Al Khaleej	Dubai (Mirdif)	UIS International School	200
Al Rams	Ar-Rams	Al Rams Stadium	4,000
Al Taawon	Al Jeer	Taawon Stadium	200
Al Urooba	Qidfa / Mirbah	Al Sharqi Stadium	3,000
Dibba Al Fujairah	Dibba Al Fujairah	Dibba New Stadium	9,000
Dibba Al Hisn	Dibba Al-Hisn	Dibba (H) Stadium	700
Dubai City	Dubai (Al Barsha)	Kings School Al Barsha	100
Dubai United	Dubai (Jumeirah)	Dubai British School	100
Fujairah	Fujairah	Fujairah Club Stadium	10,645
Gulf United	Dubai (Al Jaddaf)	Dubai Club Stadium	7,000
Masafi	Masafi	Masafi Stadium	2,000
Masfout	Masfout	Masfout Club Stadium	3,000

== Personnel and kits ==
Note: Flags indicate national team as has been defined under FIFA eligibility rules. Players may hold more than one non-FIFA nationality.

Team	Head Coach	Captain	Kit Manufacturer	Shirt Sponsor
Al Arabi	(Algeria) Fouad Boumdal	(United Arab Emirates) Ahmed Hussain	Nike	
Al Dhafra	(Brazil) Paulo Comelli	(United Arab Emirates) Sultan Al Ghaferi	Kelme	Al Dhannah
Al Dhaid	(United Arab Emirates) Jamal Al Hassani	(United Arab Emirates) Salem Al Qaydi	uhlsport	
Al Hamriyah	(United Arab Emirates) Mohamed Al Jalboot	(United Arab Emirates) Othman Al-Hamour	Macron	
Al Jazirah Al Hamra	(Egypt) Samir El Sheikh	(United Arab Emirates) Ali Sanqoor	uhlsport	
Al Khaleej	(United Arab Emirates) Mohammed Al Ajmani	(United Arab Emirates) Nasser Al-Shahary	uhlsport	
Al Rams	(United Arab Emirates) Abdulla Al Teneiji	(United Arab Emirates) Mohamed Al Ali	uhlsport	
Al Taawon	(United Arab Emirates) Badr Al Shehhi	(United Arab Emirates) Abdullah Malallah	uhlsport	
Al Urooba	(Portugal) Bruno Pereira	(Oman) Khalid Al-Jabri	uhlsport	
Dibba Al Fujairah	(United Arab Emirates) Eid Baroot	(United Arab Emirates) Mohamed Al Rowaihy	uhlsport	
Dibba Al Hisn	(Egypt) Tareq Al Sayed	(United Arab Emirates) Fahad Rashed	uhlsport	
Dubai City	(United Arab Emirates) Saeed Jassem	(United Arab Emirates) Abdullah Al Ahmadi	uhlsport	
Dubai United	(France) Johann Louvel	(United Arab Emirates) Ahmed Sulaiman	Umbro	
Fujairah	(Serbia) Željko Markov	(Algeria) Okacha Hamzaoui	Puma	
Gulf United	(Wales) Neil Taylor	(England) Jack Shiels	Puma	
Masafi	(Morocco) Brahim Boufoud	(United Arab Emirates) Abdullah Al-Shahyary	Adidas	
Masfout	(United Arab Emirates) Mohammed Al Blooshi	(United Arab Emirates) Hamad Ali	Puma	

=== Foreign players ===
All teams could register as many foreign players as they want, but could only use two on the field each game.

- Players name in **bold** indicates the player is registered during the mid-season transfer window.
- Players in italics were out of the squad or left the club within the season, after the pre-season transfer window, or in the mid-season transfer window, and at least had one appearance.

Club	Player 1	Player 2	Former Players
Al Arabi	(Brazil) Júnior Saudade	(Brazil) Vander Vieira	
Al Dhafra	(Democratic Republic of the Congo) Benik Afobe	(Cape Verde) **Carlos Fortes**	(Brazil) Diogo Acosta
Al Dhaid	(Brazil) Phillerson	(Brazil) Dominic Vinicius	
Al Hamriyah	(Netherlands) Youssef El Jebli	(Syria) Mardik Mardikian	
Al Jazirah Al Hamra	(Brazil) Danilo	(Brazil) Mateus	
Al Khaleej	(Senegal) Ibrahima Badji	(Senegal) Lassana Camara	
Al Rams	(Brazil) Rodrigo Figueiredo	(Brazil) Joao Santos	
Al Taawon	(Brazil) Alex	(Mauritania) Ablaye Sy	
Al Urooba	(Guyana) Morgan Ferrier	(Nigeria) Victor Nwaneri	
Dibba Al Fujairah	(Brazil) Wanderson Costa		(Serbia) Nikola Stojiljković
Dibba Al Hisn	(Brazil) Gilmar	(Brazil) Cláudio Maradona	
Dubai City	(Brazil) Marcelo Henrique	(England) Daniel Williams	
Dubai United	(Argentina) Marcelo Torres	(Ivory Coast) Aboubakar Karamoko	
Fujairah	(Algeria) Okacha Hamzaoui	(Brazil) Felipe Sá	
Gulf United	(England) Jack Shiels	(Wales) Richard Peniket	
Masafi	(Brazil) Francivaldo	(Cameroon) Marius Obekop	
Masfout	(Brazil) Diego Silva	(The Gambia) Alfusainey Gassama	

=== Managerial changes ===
Team	Outgoing manager	Date of vacancy	Manner of departure	Pos.	Incoming manager	Date of appointment
Dibba Al Hisn	(Australia) Hussein Skenderovic	27 June 2023	Mutual consent	Pre-season	(Tunisia) Othmen Najjar	27 June 2023
Al Arabi	(United Arab Emirates) Abdulghani Binkarshat	5 July 2023	Mutual consent	Pre-season	(Algeria) Fouad Boumdal	5 July 2023
Masfout	(Algeria) Fouad Boumdal	5 July 2023	Signed by Al Arabi	Pre-season	(United Arab Emirates) Abdulghani Binkarshat	7 July 2023
Fujairah	(United Arab Emirates) Mohammed Al Hosani	8 October 2023	Sacked	12th	(Serbia) Željko Markov	9 October 2023
Dibba Al Fujairah	(United Arab Emirates) Hassan Al Abdouli	16 October 2023	Resigned	6th	(Serbia) Zoran Popović	16 October 2023
Masfout	(United Arab Emirates) Abdulghani Binkarshat	1 November 2023	Sacked	15th	(Serbia) Slavko Matić	2 November 2023
Al Rams	(United Arab Emirates) Mutaz Abdulla	4 November 2023	Sacked	17th	(United Arab Emirates) Ali Al Teneiji	5 November 2023
Al Hamriyah	(United Arab Emirates) Mohamed Al Ali	18 November 2023	Sacked	12th	(United Arab Emirates) Mohamed Al Jalboot	20 November 2023
Al Dhafra	(United Arab Emirates) Abdullah Mesfer	18 November 2023	Mutual consent	2nd	(Brazil) Paulo Comelli	4 December 2023
Dubai City	(United Arab Emirates) Mohammed Al Blooshi	24 November 2023	Sacked	16th	(United Arab Emirates) Saeed Jassem	25 November 2023
Dibba Al Hisn	(Tunisia) Othmen Najjar	14 December 2023	Sacked	3rd	(Egypt) Tareq Al Sayed	20 December 2023
Masfout	(Serbia) Slavko Matić	22 December 2023	Sacked	15th	(United Arab Emirates) Mohammed Al Blooshi	25 December 2023
Al Rams	(United Arab Emirates) Ali Al Teneiji	31 December 2023	Resigned	17th	(United Arab Emirates) Abdulla Al Teneiji	1 January 2024
Dibba Al Fujairah	(Serbia) Zoran Popović	2 January 2024	Sacked	8th	(United Arab Emirates) Eid Baroot	2 January 2024
Al Jazirah Al Hamra	(United Arab Emirates) Eid Baroot	2 January 2024	Signed by Dibba Al Fujairah	7th	(Egypt) Samir El Sheikh	3 January 2024

== League table ==
Pos	Team	Pld	W	D	L	GF	GA	GD	Pts	Promotion
1	Al Urooba (C, P)	31	24	6	1	57	25	+32	78	Promotion to the UAE Pro League
2	Dibba Al Hisn (P)	31	20	4	7	51	23	+28	64	Promotion to the UAE Pro League
3	Dibba Al Fujairah	31	17	12	2	51	16	+35	63	
4	Fujairah	31	14	8	9	49	38	+11	50	
5	Al Arabi	31	14	7	10	55	46	+9	49	
6	Dubai United	31	14	6	11	63	46	+17	48	
7	Al Dhafra	31	11	12	8	53	44	+9	45	
8	Masafi	31	11	11	9	51	41	+10	44	
9	Al Taawon	31	11	10	10	39	32	+7	43	
10	Al Jazirah Al Hamra	31	11	8	12	45	60	−15	41	
11	Al Hamriyah	31	10	9	12	44	46	−2	39	
12	Al Dhaid	31	9	7	15	43	54	−11	34	
13	Al Khaleej	31	8	9	14	37	48	−11	33	
14	Masfout	31	7	10	14	35	52	−17	31	
15	Gulf United	31	5	10	16	31	53	−22	25	
16	Dubai City (R)	31	1	5	25	31	82	−51	8	Relegation to UAE Second Division League
17	Al Rams (W)	16	2	0	14	20	49	−29	6	Withdrew

Updated to match(es) played on 30 May 2024. Source: soccerway
Rules for classification: 1) points; 2) head-to-head points; 3) goal difference; 4) number of goals scored.
(C) Champions; (P) Promoted; (R) Relegated; (W) ?

== Results ==
Home \ Away	ARB	DHA	DHD	HAM	JHR	KHL	RAM	TAW	URO	DAF	DAH	DCI	DUN	FUJ	GFU	MSF	MST
Al Arabi		2–2	3–1	1–2	4–1	2–1		0–1	2–2	1–1	1–2	1–0	3–2	1–1	3–0	0–0	1–2
Al Dhafra	1–2		2–2	3–0	2–2	1–0	3–2	0–0	0–0	0–1	2–1	4–2	1–1	2–1	2–2	1–2	3–2
Al Dhaid	1–2	3–2		1–3	3–0	1–1	3–0	0–3	0–1	0–4	0–1	2–1	3–2	0–1	2–2	3–1	2–2
Al Hamriyah	3–1	1–1	1–2		1–2	3–1	3–0	0–0	1–2	1–3	0–1	3–1	0–3	1–3	3–0	1–0	2–1
Al Jazirah Al Hamra	3–3	1–1	3–2	3–1		3–2	3–2	2–2	0–2	0–2	1–2	1–1	0–4	1–0	3–2	2–0	2–1
Al Khaleej	0–2	2–1	1–1	0–2	1–0		0–1	3–2	0–2	2–2	0–4	2–1	1–2	1–1	0–0	0–2	0–1
Al Rams	0–5	0–3	3–0		3–4	1–3			2–3			0–2	2–4	4–1	0–0	2–6	
Al Taawon	1–1	1–1	1–3	3–0	2–2	0–1	2–0		0–2	1–2	0–2	4–1	1–1	2–0	0–1	3–1	0–0
Al Urooba	2–0	3–1	1–0	2–2	3–1	3–3	3–1	1–0		0–0	2–1	2–1	3–2	2–1	2–1	2–1	3–1
Dibba Al Fujairah	2–1	0–0	2–2	0–0	4–0	1–0	4–0	0–0	1–0		0–0	4–0	2–2	2–0	2–0	1–1	2–0
Dibba Al Hisn	3–0	1–0	2–1	1–0	2–1	1–0	5–0	1–2	0–2	0–0		4–1	2–1	1–2	0–0	1–1	3–0
Dubai City	2–4	0–2	1–1	2–2	0–2	2–4	1–0	1–3	1–2	0–2	1–2		1–4	3–4	1–2	1–6	1–1
Dubai United	1–2	1–3	1–0	4–4	1–2	2–0	2–0	1–0	1–2	2–1	0–1	6–2		0–0	2–0	1–0	4–0
Fujairah	5–1	4–3	2–1	3–2	4–1	1–1		0–1	0–1	0–0	1–0	2–0	2–1		0–1	3–3	4–1
Gulf United	3–1	1–3	0–2	1–1	1–1	3–3	2–1	1–2	1–2	1–3	0–3	1–1	1–2	0–2		1–2	2–2
Masafi	1–2	2–4	1–2	1–1	4–1	1–1		0–0	0–0	2–1	3–2	3–0	3–3	1–1	2–1		0–0
Masfout	0–3	2–2	4–2	0–0	0–0	0–3	3–2	4–2	1–3	0–2	1–2	2–1	4–2	0–0	0–0	0–1	

Updated to match(es) played on 30 May 2024. Source: soccerway
Legend: Blue = home team win; Yellow = draw; Red = away team win.
For upcoming matches, an "a" indicates there is an article about the rivalry between the two participants.

== Number of teams by Emirates ==
	Emirate	Number of teams	Teams
1	(Emirate of Ras Al Khaimah) Ras Al Khaimah	4	Al Jazira Al Hamra, Al Rams, Al Taawon and Masafi
1	(Emirate of Dubai) Dubai	4	Al Khaleej, Dubai City, Dubai United and Gulf United
3	(Emirate of Sharjah) Sharjah	3	Al Dhaid, Al Hamriyah and Dibba Al Hisn
3	Fujairah	3	Al Urooba, Dibba Al Fujairah and Fujairah
5	(Emirate of Umm Al Quwain) Umm Al Quwain	1	Al Arabi
5	(Emirate of Abu Dhabi) Abu Dhabi	1	Al Dhafra
5	(Emirate of Ajman) Ajman	1	Masfout

== Season statistics ==
=== Top Goalscorers ===
Rank	Player	Club	Goals
1	(Argentina) Marcelo Torres	Dubai United	26
2	(Brazil) Alex	Al Taawon	21
3	(The Gambia) Alfusainey Gassama	Masfout	17
4	(Democratic Republic of the Congo) Benik Afobe	Al Dhafra	16
5	(Mali) Alhassane Tamboura	Al Urooba	14
6	(Senegal) Pape Bacary	Dubai United	13
6	(Brazil) Vander Vieira	Al Arabi	13
8	(Brazil) Gilmar da Silva Ribeiro	Dibba Al-Hisn	12
8	(Jamaica) Lamar Walker	Al Dhaid	12
11	(Oman) Mohammed Al Marbuii	Dibba Al Fujairah	11
