= 2022–23 UAE Division 1 =

UAE Division One
- Season: 2022–23
- Dates: 10 October 2022 – 21 May 2023
- Champions: Hatta (2nd title)
- Promoted: Hatta; Emirates
- Matches played: 256
- Goals scored: 864 (3.38 per match)
- Top goalscorer: Diogo Acosta (24 goals)
- Biggest home win: Emirates 7–0 Al Khaleej (9 October 2022); Al Arabi 9–2 Al Fursan (19 November 2022)
- Biggest away win: Al Fursan 0–6 Emirates (14 January 2023)
- Highest scoring: Al Arabi 9–2 Al Fursan (19 November 2022)
- Longest winning run: Hatta (10 games)
- Longest unbeaten run: Hatta (18 games)
- Longest winless run: Al Fursan (26 games)
- Longest losing run: Al Fursan (18 games)

2022–23 UAE Division One is the 46th Division one season. This seasons will expand the league from 15 to 17 teams as more teams from UAE Second Division League got promoted to the league.

== Team changes ==
=== To Division 1 ===
Relegated from UAE Pro League

- Al Urooba
- Emirates

Promoted from UAE Division 2

- Al Fursan
- Baynounah

=== From Division 1 ===
Promoted to UAE Pro League

- Dibba Al Fujairah
- Al Bataeh

== Stadia and locations ==
Locations of teams in the UAE Division One

Note: Table lists clubs in alphabetical order.

Club	Home city	Stadium	Capacity
Al Arabi	Umm al Quwain	Umm al Quwain Stadium	3,000
Al Dhaid	Dhaid	Al-Dhaid Stadium	500
Al Fursan	Dubai (Al Sufouh)	The Sevens Stadium	4,000
Al Hamriyah	Al Hamriyah	Al Hamriya Sports Club Stadium	5,000
Al Jazirah Al Hamra	Al Jazirah Al Hamra	Al Hamra Stadium	2,000
Al Khaleej	Dubai (Mirdif)	Various grounds	12,000
Al Rams	Ar-Rams	Al Rams Stadium	4,000
Al Taawon	Al Jeer	Taawon Stadium	200
Al Urooba	Qidfa / Mirbah	Al Sharqi Stadium	3,000
Baynounah	Ruwais	Soccer City Stadium	100
Dibba Al Hisn	Dibba Al-Hisn	Dibba (H) Stadium	700
Dubai City	Dubai (Al Barsha)	Kings School Al Barsha	100
Emirates	Ras Al Khaimah	Emirates Club Stadium	5,200
Hatta	Hatta	Hamdan Bin Rashid Stadium	5,000
Fujairah	Fujairah	Fujairah Club Stadium	10,645
Masafi	Masafi	Masafi Stadium	2,000
Masfout	Masfout	Masfout Club Stadium	3,000

== Personnel and kits ==
Note: Flags indicate national team as has been defined under FIFA eligibility rules. Players may hold more than one non-FIFA nationality.

Team	Head Coach	Captain	Kit Manufacturer	Shirt Sponsor
Al Arabi	(United Arab Emirates) Abdulghani Binkarshat	(United Arab Emirates) Rashid Al Saadi	Nike	
Al Dhaid	(United Arab Emirates) Mohamed Al Tenaiji	(Cameroon) Ernest Anang	uhlsport	
Al Fursan	(Spain) Ignacio Ayerbe	(France) Louka Christophe	Lion crew	
Al Hamriyah	(Tunisia) Tarek Hadhiri	(Brazil) Fernando Gabriel	Macron	
Al Jazirah Al Hamra	(United Arab Emirates) Mohamed Al Naqbi	(Brazil) Caio Henrique	uhlsport	
Al Khaleej	(Algeria) Ibrahim Madani	(United Arab Emirates) Abdalla Khalid	uhlsport	
Al Rams	(Brazil) Sérgio Alexandre	(United Arab Emirates) Mahmoud Hassan	uhlsport	
Al Taawon	(United Arab Emirates) Badr Al Shehhi	(United Arab Emirates) Malek Al-Shehhi	uhlsport	
Al Urooba	(Tunisia) Sami Al Qafsi	(United Arab Emirates) Talal Khameis	uhlsport	
Baynounah	(United Arab Emirates) Sultan Al Menhali	(Morocco) Mohamed Abdelmoula	Adidas	
Dibba Al Hisn	(Australia) Hussein Skenderovic	(United Arab Emirates) Yaser Al Jneibi	uhlsport	
Dubai City	(United Arab Emirates) Mohammed Al Blooshi	(United Arab Emirates) Mohammed Talib	uhlsport	
Emirates	(United Arab Emirates) Mohammed Al Jalboot	(Brazil) Diogo Acosta	uhlsport	
Fujairah	(United Arab Emirates) Mohammed Al Hosani	(United Arab Emirates) Abdullah Salem	Puma	
Hatta	(United Arab Emirates) Abdullah Mesfer	(United Arab Emirates) Rashed Eissa	uhlsport	
Masafi	(Morocco) Brahim Boufoud	(United Arab Emirates) Rashid Al Saadi	Adidas	
Masfout	(Algeria) Fouad Boumdal	(United Arab Emirates) Hamad Ali	Puma	

=== Foreign players ===
All teams could register as many foreign players as they want, but could only use two on the field each game.

- Players name in **bold** indicates the player is registered during the mid-season transfer window.
- Players in italics were out of the squad or left the club within the season, after the pre-season transfer window, or in the mid-season transfer window, and at least had one appearance.

Club	Player 1	Player 2	Former Players
Al Arabi	(Egypt) Mohamed Mahmoud	(Brazil) **Valdo Bacabal**	
Al Dhaid	(Cameroon) Ernest Anang	(Mexico) Hugo de Oliveira	
Al Fursan	(Spain) Alejandro Valderrama	(Spain) Madger Gomes	
Al Hamriyah	(Brazil) Vinícius Lopes	(France) Fatrie Sakhi	(Brazil) Fernando Gabriel (Brazil) Alex
Al Jazirah Al Hamra	(Brazil) Caio Rocha	(Syria) Abdullah Baduraldin	
Al Khaleej	(Senegal) Lassana Camara	(Senegal) Ibrahima Badji	
Al Rams	(Brazil) **Guilherme Batata**	(Brazil) **Paulo Henrique**	
Al Taawon	(Mauritania) Ablaye Sy	(Brazil) Jacó	
Al Urooba	(Cameroon) Appolinaire Kack	(France) Redah Atassi	
Baynounah	(Cameroon) Fritz Tiku	(Nigeria) Kingsley Salami	
Dibba Al Hisn	(Brazil) Gilmar	(Brazil) Paulinho	
Dubai City	(Colombia) Ronald Gonzalez	(Zambia) Nenai Banda	
Emirates	(Brazil) Dedê Costa	(Brazil) Diogo Acosta	
Fujairah	(Algeria) Okacha Hamzaoui	(Algeria) Sabri Gharbi	
Hatta	(Brazil) **Toni**	(Democratic Republic of the Congo) **Benik Afobe**	(Brazil) Denilson (Brazil) Rogerinho
Masafi	(Mauritania) Abdullahi El Kory	(Morocco) Hamza Sanhaji	
Masfout	(Nigeria) Damilare Adigun	**(Brazil) Alex**	(Brazil) Paulo Henrique

=== Managerial changes ===
Team	Outgoing manager	Date of vacancy	Manner of departure	Pos.	Incoming manager	Date of appointment
Emirates	(Egypt) Ayman El Ramady	1 June 2022	End of caretaker spell	Pre-season	(Tunisia) Fathi Al-Obeidi	1 June 2022
Dibba Al Hisn	(Morocco) Said Chkhit	1 June 2022	End of contract	Pre-season	(United Arab Emirates) Mohammed Al Jalboot	1 June 2022
Al Arabi	(United Arab Emirates) Mohammed Al Jalboot	1 June 2022	Signed by Dibba Al Hisn	Pre-season	(Morocco) Badr Al Idrisi	30 June 2022
Fujairah	(United Arab Emirates) Mohammed Al-Timoumi	1 June 2022	End of contract	Pre-season	(Algeria) Soufiane Nechma	11 July 2022
Al Urooba	(Tunisia) Fathi Al-Obeidi	1 June 2022	Signed by Emirates	Pre-season	(Serbia) Boris Bunjak	13 July 2022
Hatta	(Tunisia) Ameur Derbal	30 June 2022	End of contract	Pre-season	(North Macedonia) Gjoko Hadžievski	12 July 2022
Hatta	(North Macedonia) Gjoko Hadžievski	3 October 2022	Sacked	14th	(United Arab Emirates) Abdullah Mesfer	3 October 2022
Al Urooba	(Serbia) Boris Bunjak	25 October 2022	Sacked	12th	(Tunisia) Sami Al Qafsi	27 October 2022
Al Rams	(Tunisia) Abdelhalim Oueriemmi	29 October 2022	Sacked	13th	(Brazil) Sérgio Alexandre	1 November 2022
Fujairah	(Algeria) Soufiane Nechma	9 November 2022	Sacked	15th	(United Arab Emirates) Mohammed Al Hosani	9 November 2022
Al Jazirah Al Hamra	(United Arab Emirates) Mutaz Abdulla	16 November 2022	Resigned	3rd	(Iraq) Ameen Philip	19 November 2022
Al Jazirah Al Hamra	(Iraq) Ameen Philip	23 November 2022	Mutual consent	2nd	(United Arab Emirates) Ahmed Al Zaabi	23 November 2022
Al Arabi	(Morocco) Badr Al Idrisi	16 December 2022	Sacked	5th	(United Arab Emirates) Abdulghani Binkarshat	20 December 2022
Al Jazirah Al Hamra	(United Arab Emirates) Ahmed Al Zaabi	19 January 2023	End of caretaker spell	4th	(Morocco) Ahmed El Mujahid	19 January 2023
Dibba Al Hisn	(United Arab Emirates) Mohammed Al Jalboot	30 January 2023	Resigned	3rd	(Australia) Hussein Skenderovic	1 February 2023
Al Jazirah Al Hamra	(Morocco) Ahmed El Mujahid	5 February 2023	Sacked	7th	(United Arab Emirates) Mohamed Al Naqbi	5 February 2023
Emirates	(Tunisia) Fathi Al-Obeidi	22 February 2023	Mutual consent	4th	(United Arab Emirates) Mohammed Al Jalboot	23 February 2023

== League table ==
Pos	Team	Pld	W	D	L	GF	GA	GD	Pts	Promotion
1	Hatta (C, P)	32	23	6	3	75	37	+38	75	Promotion to the UAE Pro League
2	Emirates (P)	32	22	5	5	85	33	+52	71	Promotion to the UAE Pro League
3	Dibba Al Hisn	32	20	7	5	72	37	+35	67	
4	Masfout	32	16	8	8	49	40	+9	56	
5	Al Hamriyah	32	14	7	11	53	45	+8	49	
6	Al Arabi	32	13	9	10	55	42	+13	48	
7	Masafi	32	13	8	11	46	43	+3	47	
8	Al Khaleej	32	13	5	14	51	60	−9	44	
9	Fujairah	32	11	10	11	48	39	+9	43	
10	Al Jazirah Al Hamra	32	12	7	13	66	64	+2	43	
11	Al Taawon	32	12	6	14	44	48	−4	42	
12	Al Dhaid	32	9	13	10	39	50	−11	40	
13	Al Urooba	32	10	9	13	51	49	+2	39	
14	Al Rams	32	8	8	16	39	51	−12	32	
15	Dubai City	32	5	9	18	31	57	−26	24	
16	Al Fursan (R)	32	5	4	23	26	81	−55	19	Relegation to UAE Second Division League
17	Baynounah (R)	32	4	3	25	33	87	−54	15	Relegation to UAE Second Division League

Source: soccerway
Rules for classification: 1) points; 2) head-to-head points; 3) goal difference; 4) number of goals scored.
(C) Champions; (P) Promoted; (R) Relegated

== Results ==
Home \ Away	ARB	DHD	FSN	HAM	JHR	KHL	RAM	TAW	URO	BNN	DAH	DCI	EMI	FUJ	HAT	MSF	MST
Al Arabi		0–1	9–2	0–1	3–0	2–1	2–0	1–0	3–7	3–1	0–0	1–0	1–3	3–2	3–1	1–2	1–1
Al Dhaid	1–1		2–2	1–1	0–3	1–1	1–1	0–1	3–2	3–1	3–3	3–0	0–4	3–2	0–1	0–2	1–1
Al Fursan	1–1	0–1		1–4	2–2	1–2	0–1	0–0	0–5	1–2	0–4	3–2	0–6	1–2	1–5	0–1	0–1
Al Hamriyah	1–0	3–1	4–1		1–2	2–2	1–1	2–1	2–1	3–0	0–3	1–2	0–2	0–3 (Note: The UAE FA rewarded Fujairah a 3–0 win due to Al Hamriyah violating the substitution rule. The match originally ended as a 1–1 draw.)	1–2	1–0	4–1
Al Jazirah Al Hamra	1–1	2–2	4–0	3–5		2–2	0–2	2–2	5–1	5–1	1–3	2–1	3–1	1–0	2–4	6–2	2–1
Al Khaleej	1–0	3–0	3–1	2–1	1–1		1–0	1–2	0–3	3–2	0–4	1–0	3–2	1–3	1–2	3–4	1–2
Al Rams	0–2	0–1	0–1	0–1	2–1	2–1		0–2	2–1	3–1	2–3	0–0	3–4	0–0	0–2	1–1	2–3
Al Taawon	1–1	1–1	5–2	4–2	1–2	2–3	1–1		0–1	3–0	1–3	1–0	0–3	0–4	2–3	2–0	1–2
Al Urooba	0–3	2–2	0–1	0–0	2–1	3–1	2–2	2–1		1–0	2–3	3–3	0–1	1–2	1–1	2–2	0–1
Baynounah	2–2	0–3	2–1	0–3	3–4	2–4	2–4	1–1	1–3		1–3	3–1	0–2	0–3	1–2	1–5	2–3
Dibba Al Hisn	1–2	4–0	3–0	3–2	2–1	2–1	1–2	3–0	1–1	3–0		1–0	3–3	1–0	2–2	1–1	1–2
Dubai City	0–3	1–2	1–0	2–2	2–2	1–0	2–1	1–2	0–0	2–0	0–5		0–4	2–3	1–1	1–2	1–4
Emirates	4–1	1–1	3–1	2–1	3–2	7–0	2–1	1–2	2–1	5–0	4–1	1–1		1–1	3–0	3–0	3–1
Fujairah	3–2	1–1	0–1	2–2	3–1	1–2	2–2	1–2	0–0	1–0	1–2	1–1	1–2		1–2	2–2	1–1
Hatta	1–1	2–0	2–0	0–0	6–2	4–3	3–2	3–1	3–0 (Note: The UAE FA rewarded Hatta a 3–0 win due to Al Urooba fielding an ineligible player in the field. The match originally ended as a 0–1 victory for Al Urooba.)	6–1	1–1	2–1	3–2	1–0		1–0	3–1
Masafi	2–1	1–1	3–0	2–1	2–0	1–1	3–1	1–2	1–3	1–2	1–2	0–0	2–1	0–1	2–1		0–0
Masfout	1–1	1–0	1–2	1–2	3–1	0–2	4–1	1–0	2–1	1–1	3–0	3–2	0–0	1–1	1–3	1–0	

Source: soccerway
Legend: Blue = home team win; Yellow = draw; Red = away team win.
For upcoming matches, an "a" indicates there is an article about the rivalry between the two participants.

== Number of teams by Emirates ==
	Emirate	Number of teams	Teams
1	(Emirate of Ras Al Khaimah) Ras Al Khaimah	5	Al Jazira Al Hamra, Al Rams, Al Taawon, Emirates and Masafi
2	(Emirate of Dubai) Dubai	4	Al Fursan, Al Khaleej, Dubai City and Hatta
3	(Emirate of Sharjah) Sharjah	3	Al Dhaid, Al Hamriyah and Dibba Al Hisn
4	Fujairah	2	Al Urooba and Fujairah
5	(Emirate of Umm Al Quwain) Umm Al Quwain	1	Al Arabi
5	(Emirate of Abu Dhabi) Abu Dhabi	1	Baynounah
5	(Emirate of Ajman) Ajman	1	Masfout

== Season statistics ==
=== Top goal scorers ===
As of 31 May 2023

Rank	Player	Club	Goals
1	(Brazil) Diogo Acosta	Emirates	24
2	(Serbia) Filip Stuparevic	Al Urooba	20
3	(Brazil) Lithierry Silva	Emirates	19
4	(Mali) Alhassane Tamboura	Al Dhaid	18
4	(Senegal) Mouhameth Diop	Al Khaleej	18
6	(Oman) Fares Al-Jabri	Al Arabi	17
7	(Oman) Mohammed Al Marbuii	Dibba Al Hisn	15
8	(Brazil) Carlos Guimaraes	Al Taawon	14
8	(Brazil) Wanderson Costa	Emirates	14
8	(Argentina) Gonzalo Cordoba	Al Jazirah Al Hamra	14
