= List of football clubs in the United Arab Emirates =

This is a list of football clubs in the United Arab Emirates. Currently there are officially 49 football clubs in the United Arab Emirates. Fourteen of them compete in the top tier division, 15 of them compete in the 2nd tier division, 12 of them compete in the 3rd tier division, and eight of them are currently in a hiatus. There are four defunct clubs which means there is a total of 53 clubs in the history of UAE football.

== Dubai ==
Club	League/Division	Level	Town/City	Nickname	
Abtal Al Khaleej	UAE Division One	2	Mirdif, Dubai		
Legentus FC|	UAE Division Two	1	Dubai		
Al Fursan	UAE Division Two	UAE Division Two	3	Dubai	
Al Hilal	UAE Division Two	UAE Division Two	3	Al Lisaili	The Hawks
Al Ittifaq	Al Mamzar, Dubai	UAE Division Two	3		
Al Nasr	UAE Pro League	1	Al Nasr, Dubai	Al Ameed	
Al Nujoom	UAE Division Two	3	Mirdif, Dubai		
Al Wasl	UAE Pro League	1	Zabeel, Dubai	The Cheetahs	
Arabian Falcons	UAE Division Three	4	Dubai		
D-Gardens	UAE Division Three	4	Dubai		
Dubai City	UAE Division One	2	Al Barsha, Dubai		
Gulf United FC	UAE Division One	2	Jumeirah	The Eagles	
United FC	UAE Division One	2	Jumeirah, Dubai		
Elite Falcons	UAE Division Two	3	Al Lisaili		
Fleetwood United	UAE Division Two	3	Jebel Ali	Dubai Cods	
Hatta	UAE Division One	2	Hatta	Tornados	
Irish	UAE Division Three	4	Dubai		
HPC	UAE Division Two	3	Al Hebiah, Dubai		
Laval	UAE Division Two	3	Al Qusais, Dubai		
Palm City FC	UAE Division Two	3	Dubai		
Royal	UAE Division Two	3	Al Khawaneej		
Sporting Dubai	UAE Division Three	4	Dubai		
Shabab Al Ahli	UAE Pro League	1	Deira, Dubai	Red Knights	
TFA Dubai	UAE Division Three	4	Dubai		

== Abu Dhabi ==
Club	League/Division	Level	Town/City	Nickname
Al Ain	UAE Pro League	1	Al Ain	Al Zaeem
Al Dahra	UAE Division Two	3	KEZAD	
Al Dhafra	UAE Division One	2	Madinat Zayed	The Western Knights
Al Ethihad	UAE Division Two	4	Abu Dhabi	
Al Gharbia	UAE Division Two	4	Madinat Zayed	
Al Jazira	UAE Pro League	1	Al Nahyan, Abu Dhabi	Pride of Abu Dhabi
Al Wahda	UAE Pro League	1	Al Nahyan, Abu Dhabi	The Clarets
Baniyas	UAE Pro League	1	Al Shamkha, Abu Dhabi	Al Smawi
Baynounah	UAE Division Two	3	Abu Dhabi	
Falcon	UAE Division Three	4	Abu Dhabi	
Regional Sports	UAE Division Two	3	Al Bandar, Abu Dhabi	
Liwa	Hiatus	?	Abu Dhabi	
Sporty	UAE Division Three	4	Abu Dhabi	
United Sport	UAE Division Two	3	Al Ain	

== Sharjah ==
Club	League/Division	Lvl	Town/City	Nickname
Al Bataeh	UAE Pro League	1	Al Bataeh	
Al Dhaid	UAE Division One	2	Dhaid	
Al Hamriyah	UAE Division One	2	Al Hamriyah	The Sharks
Al Madam	Hiatus	?	Al Madam	
Dibba Al Hisn	UAE Division One	2	Dibba Al-Hisn	Hasnawy
Khor Fakkan	UAE Pro League	1	Khor Fakkan	The Eagles
Kalba	UAE Pro League	1	Kalba	The Tigers
Madenat	UAE Division Three	4	Sharjah	
Mleiha	Hiatus	?	Mleiha	
Sharjah	UAE Pro League	1	Sharjah	The King

== Fujairah ==
Club	League/Division	Lvl	Town/City	Nickname
Al Urooba	UAE Division One	2	Qidfa	Green Duo
Dibba Al Fujairah	UAE Division One	2	Dibba Al-Fujairah	The Pigeons
Fujairah	UAE Division One	2	Fujairah	Red Wolves

== Ras al Khaimah ==
Club	League/Division	Lvl	Town/City	Nickname
Al Jazirah Al Hamra	UAE Division One	2	Al Jazirah Al Hamra	
Al Mooj	UAE Division Two	3	Al Jazirah Al Hamra	
Al Rams	UAE Division One	2	Ar-Rams	
Al Taawon	UAE Division One	2	Al Jeer	
Emirates	UAE Pro League	1	Al Dhait, Ras Al Khaimah	Falcons
Masafi	UAE Division One	2	Masafi	
Ras Al Khaimah	Hiatus	?	Ras Al Khaimah	

== Ajman ==
Club	League/Division	Lvl	Town/City	Nickname
Ajman	UAE Pro League	1	Al Rashidiyah, Ajman	The Orange Brigade
Masfout	UAE Division One	2	Masfut	The Snipers
Quattro	Hiatus	?	Al Zorah, Ajman	

== Umm al Quwain ==
Club	League/Division	Lvl	Town/City	Nickname
Al Arabi	UAE Division One	2	Umm Al Quwain	
Falaj Al Mualla	Hiatus	?	Falaj Al Mualla	

== Defunct clubs ==
Club	City	Nickname
Al Dar	Al Garhoud, Dubai	
Al Falah	Al Falah, Abu Dhabi	
Al Hazem	Abu Dhabi	
Al Quwwat Al Musallaha	Abu Dhabi	
Al Shaab	Sharjah	Commandos
Al Shabab	Dubai	
Atletico Arabia	Jebel Ali	
Dubai CSC	Dubai	
