= 2020–21 UAE Division 2 =

UAE Second Division League
- Season: 2020–21
- Dates: 4 December 2020 – 10 April 2021
- Champions: Abtal Al Khaleej (1st title)
- Promoted: Abtal Al Khaleej; Dubai City
- Matches played: 175
- Goals scored: 382 (2.18 per match)
- Biggest home win: Regional 13–0 Atletico Arabia (13 March 2021)
- Biggest away win: Atletico Arabia 0–7 Laval (4 December 2020); Liwa 0–7 Baynounah (12 February 2021)
- Highest scoring: Regional 13–0 Atletico Arabia (13 March 2021)

2020–21 UAE Division two is the second season of newly formed third tier Emirati football league and it will be the first to be completed as the 2019–20 season was cancelled due to the COVID-19 pandemic. This season will feature 15 teams split into two groups, one containing 8 teams while the other containing 7. This season will see an increase in teams from the previous season which only included 10 teams. This season will include the majority of last year's participants with the exception of Quattro and Al Falah who both are supposed to be promoted to the UAE First Division League but their step towards the 2nd tier league was denied due to the cancellation and difficult facilities of the clubs preventing them from climbing the UAE football pyramid. Abtal Al Khaleej were crowned the champions of this season after defeating City 3–0 in the final.

== Stadia and locations ==
Note: Table lists clubs in alphabetical order.

=== Group A ===
Club	Home city	Stadium
Al-Hilal United	Al Lisaili	The Sevens Stadium
Al-Mooj	Al Jazirah Al Hamra	Al Jazirah Al Hamra Stadium
Atletico Arabia	Jebel Ali	JA Club Pitch
Dubai United	Dubai (Jumeirah)	Dubai British School
HPC	Dubai	Dubai Sports City
Laval United	Dubai (various towns)	Various Grounds
Regional	Abu Dhabi (Al Rowdah)	Zayed Sports City
United Sport	Al Ain	As-hab Al-Himam Stadium

=== Group B ===
Club	Home city	Stadium
Abtal Al Khaleej	Al Lisaili	The Sevens Stadium
Al Dar College	Dubai (various towns)	Various Grounds
Al Fursan	Al Lisaili	The Sevens Stadium
Al Ittifaq	Dubai	Iranian Club Pitch
Baynounah	Abu Dhabi	Armed Forces Officers Club
Dubai City	Dubai (Al Barsha)	Kings School Al Barsha
Liwa	Abu Dhabi	Old Baniyas Stadium

== League tables ==
=== Group A ===
Pos	Team	Pld	W	D	L	GF	GA	GD	Pts	Qualification
1	Al Hilal	14	10	2	2	37	12	+25	32	Qualification to the promotion Semi-finals
2	Al Mooj	14	10	0	4	40	17	+23	30	Qualification to the promotion Semi-finals
3	HPC	14	8	3	3	32	13	+19	27 (Note: HPC are ahead of Laval United on head-to-head points: HPC 4, Laval United 1.)	
4	Laval	14	8	3	3	34	13	+21	27	
5	Regional	14	4	3	7	37	38	−1	15	
6	Dubai United	14	4	2	8	26	37	−11	14	
7	United Sport	14	3	3	8	20	33	−13	12	
8	Atletico Arabia	14	1	0	13	5	68	−63	3	

Updated to match(es) played on 27 March 2021. Source: GSA
Rules for classification: 1) points; 2) head-to-head points; 3) goal difference; 4) number of goals scored.

=== Group B ===
Pos	Team	Pld	W	D	L	GF	GA	GD	Pts	Qualification
1	Dubai City	12	10	1	1	26	10	+16	31	Qualification to the promotion Semi-finals
2	Abtal Al Khaleej	12	7	2	3	27	14	+13	23	Qualification to the promotion Semi-finals
3	Al Fursan	12	7	1	4	22	15	+7	22	
4	Baynounah	12	6	2	4	22	14	+8	20	
5	Al Dar	12	1	5	6	11	24	−13	8	
6	Liwa	12	1	4	7	11	25	−14	7	
7	Al Ittifaq	12	1	3	8	17	34	−17	6	

Updated to match(es) played on 27 March 2021. Source: GSA
Rules for classification: 1) points; 2) head-to-head points; 3) goal difference; 4) number of goals scored.

== Playoffs ==
Semi-finals
1A	Al-Hilal	0	0	0
2B	Abtal Al Khaleej	5	4	9
1B	Dubai City	2	0	2
2A	Al Mooj	1	0	1

Final
2B	Abtal Al Khaleej	3
1B	Dubai City	0

== Results ==
=== Group A ===
Home \ Away	HIL	MOJ	ATA	DUN	HPC	LVL	RSP	UNA
Al-Hilal		1–3	3–0	0–0	1–2	2–0	3–0	4–1
Al-Mooj	2–3		3–0	1–3	1–0	0–1	2–0	4–1
Atletico Arabia	0–3	0–5		0–3	0–5	0–7	3–2	0–2
Dubai United	0–4	3–6	8–2		0–4	0–3	2–3	4–3
HPC	1–2	0–2	7–0	1–0		0–0	2–2	0–0
Laval	2–2	2–1	4–0	4–0	1–3		6–0	0–3
Regional	1–6	2–4	13–0	4–1	3–4	2–2		1–1
United Sport	0–3	1–6	3–0	2–2	1–3	0–2	2–4	

Updated to match(es) played on 27 March 2021. Source: GSA
Legend: Blue = home team win; Yellow = draw; Red = away team win.

=== Group B ===
Home \ Away	ABK	DAR	ITT	FSN	BNN	DCI	LWA
Abtal Al Khaleej		4–0	4–2	0–3	2–3	0–2	1–0
Al Dar	0–0		2–3	1–1	1–2	0–3	3–3
Al Ittifaq	2–7	0–2		2–4	0–0	1–2	3–3
Al Fursan	1–2	5–0	3–0		0–2	3–1	2–1
Baynounah	0–2	1–1	3–1	1–3		1–2	1–0
Dubai City	1–1	2–1	2–1	4–0	2–1		3–1
Liwa	0–1	0–0	2–2	1–0	0–7	0–2	

Updated to match(es) played on 27 March 2021. Source: GSA
Legend: Blue = home team win; Yellow = draw; Red = away team win.

== Number of teams by Emirates ==
	Emirate	Number of teams	Teams
1	(Emirate of Dubai) Dubai	10	Abtal Al Khaleej, Al Dar, Al Fursan, Al Hilal, Al Ittifaq, Atletico Arabia, Dubai City, Dubai United, HPC and Laval
2	Abu Dhabi	4	Baynounah, Liwa, Regional Sports and United Sport
3	Ras Al Khaimah	1	Al Mooj
