= 2021–22 UAE Division 2 =

UAE Second Division League
- Season: 2021–22
- Dates: 29 October 2021 – 17 April 2022
- Champions: Al Fursan (1st title)
- Promoted: Al Fursan; Baynounah
- Matches played: 110
- Goals scored: 371 (3.37 per match)
- Top goalscorer: Ayman Bouali; Sernane Segniagbeto (14 goals)
- Biggest home win: Liwa 9–0 Al Mooj (1 April 2022)
- Biggest away win: Al Mooj 1–9 Al Hilal (25 March 2022)
- Highest scoring: Al Mooj 1–9 Al Hilal (25 March 2022)

2021–22 UAE Division Two is the third season of the third tier Emirati football league. This season sees only 12 teams enter as Abtal Al Khaleej and Dubai City were promoted to the UAE First Division League and Al Dar Collage withdrew from the competition.

== Clubs and stadiums ==
Club	Home city	Stadium
Al Fursan	Al Lisaili	The Sevens Stadium
Al Hilal	Al Hamriyah	Al Hamriya Sports Club Stadium
Al Ittifaq	Dubai (Al Mamzar)	Al Mamzar Pitch
Al Mooj	Al Jazirah Al Hamra	Al Jazirah Al Hamra Stadium
Atletico Arabia	Jebel Ali	JA Club Pitch
Baynounah	Abu Dhabi	Soccer City Pitch
Dubai United	Dubai (Jumeirah)	Dubai British School
HPC	Dubai	Dubai Sports City
Laval	Dubai (Al Qusais)	Target Ground
Liwa	Abu Dhabi	Active Sporting Stadium
Regional	Abu Dhabi (Al Rowdah)	Zayed Sports City
United Sport	Al Ain	As-hab Al-Himam Stadium

== League table ==
Pos	Team	Pld	W	D	L	GF	GA	GD	Pts	Promotion
1	Al Fursan (P)	20	17	1	2	36	10	+26	52	Promotion to the UAE First Division League
2	Baynounah (P)	20	12	4	4	59	27	+32	40	Promotion to the UAE First Division League
3	Al Hilal	20	11	6	3	43	17	+26	39	
4	HPC	20	11	4	5	32	22	+10	37	
5	Laval	20	9	1	10	29	21	+8	28	
6	Al Ittifaq	20	8	4	8	42	36	+6	28	
7	Liwa	20	6	4	10	34	32	+2	22	
8	Dubai United	20	6	4	10	33	47	−14	22	
9	Regional	20	6	3	11	28	45	−17	21	
10	United Sport	20	4	5	11	15	29	−14	17	
11	Al Mooj	20	2	0	18	19	84	−65	6	
12	Atletico Arabia (W)	0	0	0	0	0	0	0	0	Withdrew

Source: GSA
Rules for classification: 1) points; 2) head-to-head points; 3) goal difference; 4) number of goals scored.
(P) Promoted; (W) Withdrew

== Results ==
Home \ Away	FSN	HIL	ITT	MOJ	ATA	BNN	DUN	HPC	LVL	LWA	RSP	UNA
Al Fursan		1–2	2–1	3–0		1–0	3–0	3–1	2–0	1–0	1–0	1–0
Al Hilal	0–2		1–0	8–0		2–2	3–0	2–1	1–0	1–1	1–1	4–0
Al Ittifaq	0–1	1–1		3–1		2–5	3–2	1–2	2–0	3–3	3–3	1–0
Al Mooj	0–2	1–9	0–5			0–3	0–3	3–0	0–6	3–0	1–3	1–2
Atletico Arabia												
Baynounah	1–2	1–1	2–4	6–1			6–1	2–2	1–0	2–0	5–2	2–2
Dubai United	3–3	0–2	2–6	5–4		2–2		0–1	1–1	1–1	2–0	2–2
HPC	0–1	2–2	1–1	6–1		1–0	1–0		1–0	4–3	2–1	0–0
Laval	0–2	2–0	3–0	3–2		2–4	4–0	1–0		0–1	3–2	3–0
Liwa	0–1	2–1	0–3	9–0		1–2	1–3	1–3	2–0		0–3	1–1
Regional	0–3	0–1	1–0	7–1		0–7	1–3	0–3	3–0	0–7		4–2
United Sport	1–0	0–1	5–2	1–0		1–5	0–1	0–1	0–1	0–1	0–0	

Source: uaefa
Legend: Blue = home team win; Yellow = draw; Red = away team win.

== Season statistics ==
=== Top Scorers ===
As of 17 April 2022

Rank	Player	Club	Goals
1	(Morocco) Ayman Bouali	Baynounah	11
1	(Togo) Sernane Segniagbeto	Al Ittifaq	11
3	(Argentina) Julian Gil	HPC	8
4	(Brazil) Sylas	Al Hilal	7
5	(Ghana) Samuel Gyamfi	Laval	6

== Number of teams by Emirates ==
	Emirate	Number of teams	Teams
1	(Emirate of Dubai) Dubai	7	Al Fursan, Al Hilal, Al Ittifaq, Atletico Arabia, Dubai United, HPC and Laval
2	Abu Dhabi	4	Baynounah, Liwa, Regional Sports and United Sport
3	Ras Al Khaimah	1	Al Mooj
