= Abraham Okyere =

Ghanaian footballer (born 2002)

Personal information
- Date of birth: 6 July 2002 (age 24)
- Place of birth: Ghana
- Height: 1.80 m (5 ft 11 in)
- Position: Midfielder

Team information
- Current team: Las Vegas Lights
- Number: 43

Youth career
- International Allies

Senior career*
Years	Team	Apps	(Gls)
2019–2020	International Allies	10	(0)
2020–2021	Al Hilal United	9	(0)
2021–2023	Beerschot	3	(0)
2023	TRAU	11	(2)
2024	KPV	24	(3)
2025	Haka	23	(1)
2026–	Las Vegas Lights	21	(4)
- * Club domestic league appearances and goals as of 10:23, 9 November 2026 (UTC)

Abraham Okyere (born 6 July 2002) is a Ghanaian professional footballer who plays as midfielder for Las Vegas Lights FC in the USL Championship. He previously played for Ghanaian Premier League side International Allies.

== Career ==
Okyere started his career with Ghanaian club International Allies in 2018 moving through the ranks till he was promoted to the senior team. He made his debut during the 2019 2019 GFA Normalization Committee Special Competition.

After playing for Al-Hilal United in United Arab Emirates, on 22 June 2021, Okyere signed for Belgian First Division A side Beerschot on a two-year deal.

During the 2023 season, Okyere had a stint in India with TRAU FC in the country's second-tier I-League.

Okyere moved to Finland in April 2024 and signed with Kokkolan Palloveikot (KPV) in third-tier Ykkönen. The team eventually finished as the season's runner-up, but were defeated in the promotion play-offs by Käpylän Pallo. After the season, Okyere was named the Ykkönen Midfielder of the Year.

On 31 October 2024, he joined Haka in Finnish top-tier Veikkausliiga on a two-year deal.

In December 2025, Las Vegas Lights announced they had signed Okyere through the 2027 USL Championship season.

== Career statistics ==
As of 18 May 2025

Appearances and goals by club, season and competition
Club	Season	League			Cup (Note: Includes Belgian Cup, Suomen Cup)		Continental		Other		Total	
Club	Season	Division	Apps	Goals	Apps	Goals	Apps	Goals	Apps	Goals	Apps	Goals
International Allies	2019	Ghana Premier League	4	0	–		–		–		4	0
International Allies	2019–20	Ghana Premier League	6	0	–		–		–		6	0
International Allies	Total		10	0	0	0	0	0	0	0	10	0
Al Hilal United	2020–21	UAE Second Division League	9	0	–		–		–		9	0
Beerschot	2021–22	Belgian Pro League	2	0	0	0	–		–		2	0
Beerschot	2022–23	Challenger Pro League	1	0	1	0	–		–		2	0
Beerschot	Total		3	0	1	0	0	0	0	0	4	0
Beerschot U23	2022–23	Belgian Division 2	18	9	–		–		–		18	9
TRAU	2023–24	I-League	11	2	–		–		–		11	2
KPV	2024	Ykkönen	24	3	5	0	–		–		29	3
Haka	2025	Veikkausliiga	7	0	1	0	–		4 (Note: Appearances in Finnish League Cup)	0	12	0
Career total			82	14	7	0	0	0	4	0	93	14

== Honours ==
KPV

- Ykkönen runner-up: 2024

Individual

- Ykkönen Midfielder of the Year: 2024
