= 2022–23 UAE Division 2 =

Football League in the UAE

UAE Second Division League
- Season: 2022–23
- Dates: 7 October 2022 – 25 March 2023
- Champions: Gulf United (1st title)
- Promoted: Gulf United; Dubai United
- Top goalscorer: Pape Gueye (14 goals)
- Biggest home win: Gulf United 5–0 Laval (26 February 2023)
- Biggest away win: Al Hilal 1–7 Dubai United (18 March 2023)
- Highest scoring: Gulf United 5–3 Regional (5 February 2023); Al Hilal 1–7 Dubai United (18 March 2023)

2022–23 UAE Division Two was the fourth season of the third tier Emirati football league. This season had only ten participants due to Liwa and Atletico Arabia's withdrawal. After a decisive victory against Al Hilal, Gulf United won the league title and secured promotion to the UAE First Division League with Dubai United also securing promotion after a 2–0 win against Fleetwood United.

== Stadia and locations ==
Locations of stadiums in UAE Division 2

=== Clubs ===
Club	Home city
Al Hilal	Al Lisaili
Al Ittifaq	Dubai (Al Mamzar)
Al Mooj	Al Jazirah Al Hamra
Dubai United	Dubai (Jumeirah)
Fleetwood United	Jebel Ali
Gulf United	Dubai (Al Jaddaf)
HPC	Dubai (Al Hebiah)
Laval	Dubai (Al Qusais)
Regional	Abu Dhabi
United Sport	Al Ain

=== Venues ===
Stadium	Capacity	Team(s)
Al Hamriyah Stadium	5,000	Al Hilal; Fleetwood United
Al Mazmar Pitch 1	1,000	Gulf United
As-hab Al-Himam Stadium	1,000	United Sport
Baniyas Stadium	9,000	Al Mooj
Dubai Sports Pitch 2	1,000	Dubai United; Fleetwood United; HPC
North London School	550	Al Ittifaq
People of Determination Stadium	500	Gulf United; Laval
Sheikh Zayed Sub Pitch 1	2,000	Regional
Shooting Club Pitch	600	Fleetwood United

== League table ==
Pos	Team	Pld	W	D	L	GF	GA	GD	Pts	Promotion
1	Gulf United (C, P)	18	12	4	2	42	20	+22	40 (Note: Gulf United are ahead of Dubai United on head-to-head points: Gulf United 4, Dubai United 1.)	Promotion to the UAE First Division League
2	Dubai United (P)	18	12	4	2	43	15	+28	40	Promotion to the UAE First Division League
3	Fleetwood United	18	11	2	5	30	18	+12	35	
4	United Sport	18	7	5	6	26	22	+4	26 (Note: United Sport are ahead of HPC on head-to-head points: United Sport 4, HPC 1.)	
5	HPC	18	7	5	6	25	18	+7	26	
6	Regional	18	6	4	8	26	32	−6	22	
7	Al Mooj	18	4	7	7	17	25	−8	19	
8	Al Hilal	18	4	4	10	22	43	−21	16	
9	Laval	18	3	6	9	17	34	−17	15	
10	Al Ittifaq	18	1	5	12	13	34	−21	8	

Source: GSA
Rules for classification: 1) points; 2) head-to-head points; 3) goal difference; 4) number of goals scored.
(C) Champions; (P) Promoted

== Results ==
Home \ Away	HIL	ITT	MOJ	DUN	FWU	GFU	HPC	LVL	RSP	UNA
Al Hilal		2–1	0–3	1–7	1–2	3–0	1–1	1–5	1–2	1–2
Al Ittifaq	1–2		0–1	0–3	1–1	0–2	1–0	1–1	2–2	2–3
Al Mooj	1–1	1–1		0–0	1–3	1–3	0–3	3–1	2–0	1–1
Dubai United	0–0	4–1	1–1		2–0	1–2	2–0	4–1	4–0	4–3
Fleetwood United	4–0	2–0	3–0	1–3		0–2	3–0	1–1	1–0	0–1
Gulf United	5–1	3–2	3–0	2–2	5–2		1–1	5–0	5–3	1–0
HPC	2–1	3–0	2–1	0–1	0–1	0–0		2–0	2–2	0–1
Laval	1–2	0–0	2–0	0–3	0–3	0–0	1–4		2–4	0–0
Regional	3–3	1–0	1–1	2–0	0–1	2–0	1–4	0–1		1–3
United Sport	3–1	3–0	0–0	1–2	1–2	2–3	1–1	1–1	0–2	

Source: GSA
Legend: Blue = home team win; Yellow = draw; Red = away team win.

== Season statistics ==
=== Top Scorers ===
As of 25 March 2023

Rank	Player	Club	Goals
1	(Senegal) Pape Gueye	Dubai United	14
2	(England) Richard Peniket	Gulf United	11
3	(Sudan) Abdalla Abbakar	Al Hilal	8
3	(Syria) Haitham Ahmad	Regional	8
5	(Mauritania) Ahmed Salem	Regional	7
5	(South Africa) Kyle Ross	Fleetwood United	7
7	(Lebanon) Adam Sayed	Al Ittifaq	6
7	(Lebanon) Hussein Hawi	HPC	6
7	(England) Jamal Bartley	Gulf United	6
7	(Ghana) Peter Sottie	Regional	6

== Number of teams by Emirates ==
	Emirate	Number of teams	Teams
1	(Emirate of Dubai) Dubai	7	Al Hilal, Al Ittifaq, Dubai United, Fleetwood United, Gulf United, HPC and Laval
2	Abu Dhabi	2	Regional and United Sport
3	Ras Al Khaimah	1	Al Mooj
