= UAE Third Division League =

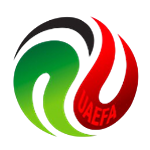
- Organising body: UAE Football Association
- Founded: 2021; 5 years ago
- Country: United Arab Emirates
- Confederation: AFC
- Number of clubs: 18
- Level on pyramid: 4
- Promotion to: UAE Second Division League
- Current champions: United FC II (2024-25)
- Most championships: Gulf United, Royal, Arabian Falcons FC, United FC II (1 title each)
- Website: uaefa.ae
- Current: 2025–26 season

UAE Third Division League is the fourth tier of football league competition in the United Arab Emirates, the league is organised by UAE Football Association for private funded clubs. The league was established for the 2021–22 season. 12 teams participated in the first edition, divided in two groups of six. On 6 July 2022, UAEFA announced that the number of participants will increase from 12 to 16 teams for the 2022–23 season, an increase of 4 teams from the 2021–22 season.The current champions as of the 2023–24 season are the Arabian Falcons FC .

== Current teams ==
As of 2025–26 UAE Third Division League

Note: Table lists clubs in alphabetical order

Club	City	Stadium
Al Arabi II	Umm Al Quwain	Umm Al Quwain Stadium
Al Shahama	Abu Dhabi	AlShahama Equestrian Football Club Stadium
Athletic	Dubai (Al Barsha)	Brighton Collage Dubai
Dragon City	Dubai	Unknown
Dubai City II	Dubai (Al Barsha)	Kings School Al Barsha
Emerald	Dubai	Unknown
Falcon	Abu Dhabi	Abu Dhabi University
Forte Virtus B	Dubai (Mirdif)	UIS International School
G-Reds	Sharjah	Unknown
Irish	Dubai (Al Wasl)	Dubai Irish Sports Ground- Dubai Sports City
Liver Sport	Al Ain	Al Ain Amblers Rugby Club
Modern Sport	Dubai	Unknown
Nova Star	Dubai	Unknown
Olympic	Dubai	Unknown
Rimal Al Sahra	Dubai (Al Quoz)	Unknown
The Circle	Dubai (Al Kheeran)	The Football Circle
United Sport	Al Ain	As-hab Al-Himam Stadium

== Competition format ==
The 2021–22 edition featured 12 teams in two groups that competed in a round robin league format of home and away game. The top two teams from each group would then qualify into a semi-final, in which the winner of group Group A would face the runner-up of group B, and vice versa. The semi-finals would take place over two legs (home and away). The winners of the semi-finals would secure promotion to the UAE Second Division and a place in the UAE Third Division final. As of the 2023–24 season, the competition is organised in a standard round-robin format, with each team competing against each other twice.

== List of champions ==
- 2021–22: Gulf United
- 2022–23: Royal
- 2023–24: Arabian Falcons FC
- 2024-25: United FC II
