= Obaid Raihan =

Emirati footballer (born 1988)

Personal information
- Full name: Obaid Thani Belal Raihan
- Date of birth: 14 August 1988 (age 38)
- Place of birth: United Arab Emirates
- Height: 1.78 m (5 ft 10 in)
- Position: Goalkeeper

Youth career
- 2005–2007: Al-Shabab

Senior career*
Years	Team	Apps	(Gls)
2014–2020	Hatta		
2020–2021	Khor Fakkan		
2021–2022	Al Jazirah Al-Hamra		
2022–2023	Al Urooba		
2023–2024	Dubai City		
2024–2025	Fleetwood United		
- * Club domestic league appearances and goals

Obaid Raihan (Arabic:عبيد ريحان) (born 14 August 1988) is an Emirati footballer who plays as a goalkeeper.
