= Mohammad Talib =

Emirati association football player (born 1988)

Mohammad Talib محمد طالب
Personal information
- Full name: Mohammad Talib Mohammad Ali Abbas
- Date of birth: 14 May 1988 (age 38)
- Place of birth: Emirates
- Height: 1.64 m (5 ft 5 in)
- Position: Left-back

Youth career
- 2004–2009: Al Ahli

Senior career*
| Years | Team | Apps | (Gls) |
| 2009 | Al-Rams | | |
| 2009–2012 | Masafi | | |
| 2012–2015 | Dibba Al-Hisn | | |
| 2015–2016 | Al Urooba | | |
| 2016–2017 | Dubai | | |
| 2017–2020 | Hatta | | |
| 2018 | → Al Urooba (loan) | | |
| 2020–2021 | Al Hamriyah | | |
| 2021–2022 | Al Dhaid | | |
| 2022 | Al Jazirah Al-Hamra | | |
| 2022–2024 | Dubai City | | |
| 2024–2025 | Al Jazirah Al-Hamra | | |
- * Club domestic league appearances and goals

Mohammad Talib (Arabic:محمد طالب; born 14 May 1988) is an Emirati footballer. He currently plays as a left back.

== Career ==
He formerly played for Al Ahli, Al-Rams, Masafi, Dibba Al-Hisn, Al Urooba, Dubai, and Hatta.
