= 2019–20 UAE Division 2 =

UAE Second Division League
- Season: 2019–20
- Champions: Quattro
- Promoted: No promotion awarded
- Matches played: 85
- Goals scored: 296 (3.48 per match)

2019–20 UAE Division two was the first UAE Division two season. The competition was created to create more clubs and increase the number of players in UAE. The season will feature 10 teams, 4 from Abu Dhabi, 4 from Dubai and 1 from Ras Al Khaimah and Ajman respectively. The season was cancelled due to the COVID-19 pandemic in the United Arab Emirates.

== Stadia and locations ==
Note: Table lists clubs in alphabetical order.

Club	Home city	Stadium
Al Dar	Dubai (various towns)	Various Grounds
Al Falah	Abu Dhabi (Al Falah)	Zayed Sports City
Al Hazem	Abu Dhabi (Al Shamkha)	Old Baniyas Stadium
Al Mooj	Al Jazirah Al Hamra	Al Jazirah Al Hamra Stadium
Al Hilal	Al Lisaili	The Sevens Stadium
Dubai City	Dubai (Al Barsha)	Kings School Al Barsha
Dubai United	Dubai (Jumeirah)	Dubai British School
Quattro	Ajman	Humaid bin Abdulaziz Stadium
Regional	Abu Dhabi (Al Rowdah)	Zayed Sports City
Sport Support	Abu Dhabi (Al Rowdah)	Armed Forces Officers Club

== League table ==
Pos	Team	Pld	W	D	L	GF	GA	GD	Pts
1	Quattro (C)	17	12	2	3	39	17	+22	38
2	Al Falah	17	9	6	2	32	17	+15	33
3	Dubai United	17	8	3	6	29	29	0	27
4	Al Mooj	17	8	2	7	34	33	+1	26
5	Al Hilal	17	7	2	8	40	40	0	23
6	Al Dar	17	6	5	6	27	29	−2	23
7	Dubai City	17	6	2	9	32	37	−5	20
8	Sport Support	17	6	2	9	21	33	−12	20
9	Al-Hazem	17	4	5	8	25	30	−5	17
10	Regional	17	3	3	11	27	40	−13	12

Updated to match(es) played on 13 March 2020. Source: kooora
Rules for classification: 1) points; 2) head-to-head points; 3) goal difference; 4) number of goals scored.
(C) Champions

== Results ==
Home \ Away	DAR	FLH	HZM	HIL	MOJ	DCI	DUN	QUT	RSP	SST
Al Dar		1–1	1–0	2–2	1–3	2–0	—	1–2	3–1	4–1
Al Falah	4–1		2–3	1–3	4–0	2–2	3–1	—	1–0	2–0
Al Hazem	2–2	0–0		2–3	1–3	2–1	2–3	1–3	2–2	1–2
Al Hilal	4–2	1–2	2–3		2–0	2–4	1–3	3–2	3–4	3–4
Al Mooj	0–2	1–1	2–1	—		3–2	5–0	3–1	2–0	3–0
Dubai City	4–1	0–1	—	2–2	5–4		1–5	0–1	4–1	1–0
Dubai United	0–0	2–2	1–3	0–2	5–1	2–1		1–3	3–1	2–0
Quattro	3–0	1–1	0–0	3–0	4–1	3–2	4–0		5–2	1–0
Regional	2–3	1–3	0–0	2–4	2–2	5–1	1–2	0–2		3–0
Sport Support	1–1	0–2	3–2	4–3	2–1	1–2	1–1	2–1	—	

Updated to match(es) played on 2020. Source: koora
Legend: Blue = home team win; Yellow = draw; Red = away team win.

== Number of teams by Emirates ==
	Emirate	Number of teams	Teams
1	Abu Dhabi	4	Al Falah, Al-Hazem, Regional Sports and Sport Support
1	(Emirate of Dubai) Dubai	4	Al Dar, Al Hilal, Dubai City and Dubai United
2	Ajman	1	Quattro
2	Ras Al Khaimah	1	Al Mooj
