= Michael Rice (football manager) =

English association football manager

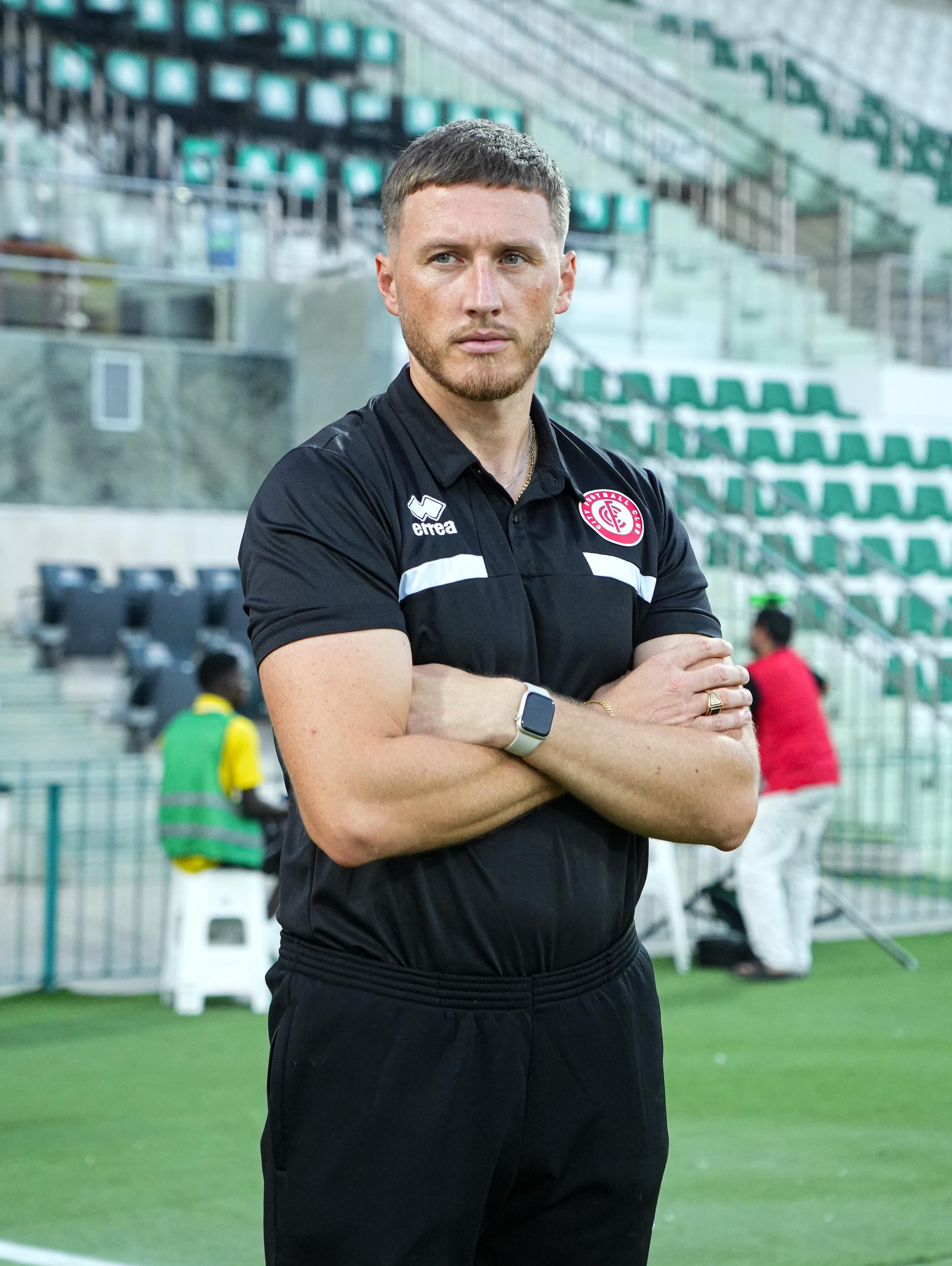

Personal information
- Full name: Michael William Rice
- Place of birth: Southport, United Kingdom

Team information
- Current team: Dubai City (manager)

Managerial career
- Years: Team
- 2020–2024: Fleetwood United
- 2024–: Dubai City

Michael William Rice (born 8 December 1989) is an English football manager who is currently the manager of UAE Second Division League club Dubai City F.C..

== Football coaching career ==
=== Liverpool International Academy (2011–2019) ===
Rice has experience coaching overseas with various professional clubs in several different capacities. He started his coaching career at Premier League club Liverpool, where he was the head coach of Liverpool International Football Academy - DSK in India, South Korea and Dubai.

=== Fleetwood United (2020–2024) ===
In 2020, Rice was appointed as manager of Fleetwood United, the Dubai-based former sister club of EFL League Two club Fleetwood Town.

During his tenure, Rice led the team to two promotions and secured one league title.

In 2024, Fleetwood Town opted to discontinue operations in Dubai, leading to the sale of Fleetwood United. Following this change, Rice decided to part ways with the club.

=== Dubai City (2024–present) ===
Shortly after leaving Fleetwood United, Rice was appointed as manager of Dubai City F.C.
