= Sergey Kundik =

Russian-Portuguese footballer

Personal information
- Full name: Sergey Aleksandrovich Kundik
- Date of birth: 10 July 1995 (age 31)
- Place of birth: Novosibirsk, Russia
- Height: 1.81 m (5 ft 11 1/2 in)
- Position: Striker

Team information
- Current team: Laval United
- Number: 25

Youth career
- 2004–2006: Esc. Luciano de Sousa
- 2006–2009: Porto
- 2010–2011: Boavista
- 2011–2012: Spartak Moscow
- 2012–2013: Rangers
- 2013–2014: Braga

Senior career*
Years	Team	Apps	(Gls)
2011–2012	Fão	5	(0)
2014	Rio Tinto	11	(0)
2015	Grijó	5	(0)
2016–2017	Nogueirense	12	(1)
2017	Anagennisi Deryneia	4	(0)
2017–2018	AEZ Zakakiou	2	(0)
2018–2019	Panegialios		
2019–2020	Zakynthos		
2020–2021	Banga	5	(0)
2021–	Laval United		
- * Club domestic league appearances and goals as of 2 January 2022

Sergey Aleksandrovich Kundik (Russian: Сергей Александрович Кундик; born 10 July 1995) is a Russian-Portuguese football striker who plays as a striker for Laval United.

== Early life ==
Sergey was born in Novosibirsk, Russia and moved to Portugal with his family when he was only nine years of age. He is a national of both Russia and Portugal.

== Club career ==
Starting his youth career in Portugal, Kundik travelled from one club to another in the next five years before joining the Spartak Moscow youth system in his home country in 2011, having had a number of trials during that period, including those at Real Madrid and Palmeiras. Shortly after the Russian club refused to sign him, he was offered a contract with Rangers for the 2012–2013 season where he played for the reserves. He finally signed a senior contract with the third-tier club Nogueirense in Portugal. On 30 January 2017, he agreed to join Cypriot First Division side Anagennisi Deryneia for the rest of the season. He played a total of five games in the 2016–17 season (which Anagennisi ended at the bottom of the table, resulting in relegation), including one in the cup against Doxa Katokopias.
