= Michael Rice =

Michael or Mike Rice may refer to:

== Sports ==
- Michael Rice (cyclist) (born 1996), competed in the 2018 Tour of California
- Michael Rice (football manager), English football manager
- Michael Rice (hurler) (born 1984), Kilkenny hurler
- Mike Rice (basketball), American basketball television commentator
- Mike Rice Jr. (born 1969), American basketball coach

== Others ==
- Michael Rice (educator) (born c. 1963), American educator
- Michael Rice (singer) (born 1997), British entrant for Eurovision Song Contest 2019
- Michael A. Rice (born 1955), American biologist and politician
- Michael W. Rice (born 1943), president and CEO of Utz Quality Foods, Inc.
- Mike Rice (politician), Vermont state legislator

== See also ==
- Sonny Rice (born 1936 or 1937), Irish association footballer
