= Francesco Serafino =

Italian-Argentine footballer

Personal information
- Date of birth: 17 September 1997 (age 29)
- Place of birth: Rho, Italy
- Height: 1.72 m (5 ft 8 in)
- Position: Forward

Team information
- Current team: Fursan Hispania
- Number: 97

Senior career*
Years	Team	Apps	(Gls)
2015–2016	Huracán	3	(0)
2017	Naxxar Lions	1	(0)
2019–2020	Bangor City	27	(12)
2020–2021	Sambenedettese	4	(0)
2021–2022	Castiglione		
2023	CSD JJM		
2023–2024	Castrovillari	6	(0)
2024	Sol de América	0	(0)
2024–2025	Mexicali	12	(1)
2025–	Fursan Hispania	0	(0)
- * Club domestic league appearances and goals as of 21:49, 1 February 2025 (UTC)

Francesco Serafino (born 17 September 1997) is an Italian footballer who plays for UAE Second Division League club Fursan Hispania.

== Career ==
Serafino was a youth player with Boca Juniors. In 2015, he signed for Huracán in the Uruguayan Segunda División. After that, he played for Naxxar Lions (Malta) before joining Bangor City (Wales) and scored 12 goals along with 10 assists during the 2019–20 season (Season closed in early March due to the Covid-19 pandemic). Francesco also played for Sambenedettese (2020–21).

== Personal life ==
Francesco Serafino played as a child in various clubs in different countries to follow his father, who was engaged as a musician in various countries of the world. Reggina Calcio, Argentinos Juniors, As Roma Calcio, River Plate and Boca Juniors. As a child he played tournaments in Argentina, Spain and Italy. Note a story related to Torino Calcio who hired him at the age of 17, but FIFA refused the membership because he came from a foreign federation as he was still a minor. Not yet of age, he signed his first professional contract with Huracán Montevideo (Uruguay) in 2015.
