= Arabian Falcons =

Arabian Falcons FC may refer to:

- Arabian Falcons FC, a football club in the United Arab Emirates
- Saudi Arabia national football team, nicknamed the Arabian Falcons
  - Saudi Arabia women's national football team, the women's team also nicknamed the Arabian Falcons
