= Benik Afobe =

Dr Congolese footballer (born 1993)

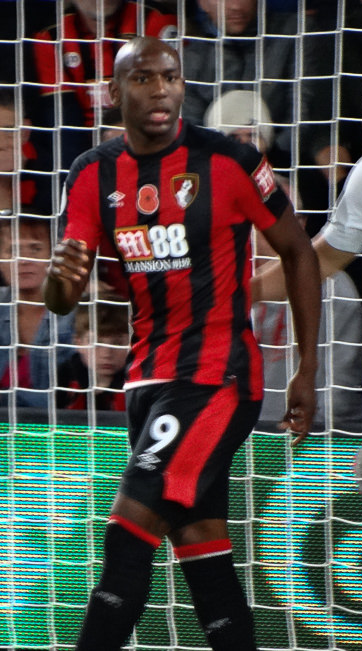
- Afobe playing for Bournemouth in 2017

Personal information
- Full name: Benik Tunani Afobe
- Date of birth: 12 February 1993 (age 33)
- Place of birth: Leyton, London, England
- Height: 6 ft 0 in (1.83 m)
- Position: Striker

Team information
- Current team: Al-Arabi
- Number: 93

Youth career
- 2001–2010: Arsenal

Senior career*
| Years | Team | Apps | (Gls) |
| 2010–2015 | Arsenal | 0 | (0) |
| 2010–2011 | → Huddersfield Town (loan) | 28 | (5) |
| 2012 | → Reading (loan) | 3 | (0) |
| 2012–2013 | → Bolton Wanderers (loan) | 20 | (2) |
| 2013 | → Millwall (loan) | 5 | (0) |
| 2014 | → Sheffield Wednesday (loan) | 12 | (2) |
| 2014–2015 | → Milton Keynes Dons (loan) | 22 | (10) |
| 2015–2016 | Wolverhampton Wanderers | 46 | (22) |
| 2016–2018 | Bournemouth | 63 | (10) |
| 2018 | → Wolverhampton Wanderers (loan) | 16 | (6) |
| 2018–2019 | Wolverhampton Wanderers | 0 | (0) |
| 2018–2019 | → Stoke City (loan) | 26 | (6) |
| 2019–2022 | Stoke City | 20 | (2) |
| 2019–2020 | → Bristol City (loan) | 12 | (3) |
| 2020–2021 | → Trabzonspor (loan) | 28 | (5) |
| 2021–2022 | → Millwall (loan) | 38 | (12) |
| 2022–2023 | Millwall | 19 | (2) |
| 2023 | Hatta | 17 | (9) |
| 2023–2024 | Al Dhafra | 25 | (15) |
| 2025– | Al-Arabi | 8 | (7) |

International career^{‡}
| 2008 | England U16 | 3 | (4) |
| 2009–2010 | England U17 | 23 | (11) |
| 2010–2012 | England U19 | 10 | (7) |
| 2012–2013 | England U21 | 2 | (1) |
| 2017–2018 | DR Congo | 6 | (1) |
Medal record
Men's football
Representing England
UEFA European Under-17 Championship
| Winner | 2010 Liechtenstein |
- * Club domestic league appearances and goals as of 19:10, 20 April 2024 (UTC) ‡ National team caps and goals as of 24 November 2021

Benik Tunani Afobe (born 12 February 1993) is a professional footballer who plays for Al-Arabi as a striker. Born in England, he represented the DR Congo national team on six occasions between 2017 and 2018.

Afobe signed a professional contract with Arsenal in February 2010, and was loaned to various clubs including Huddersfield Town, Reading, Bolton Wanderers, Millwall, Sheffield Wednesday and Milton Keynes Dons before signing for Wolverhampton Wanderers in January 2015. A year later, he signed for Bournemouth for £10 million. After a season there, he returned on loan to former club Wolves the following season where he secured a £10 million transfer back to Molineux. However soon after, he joined Stoke City initially on loan before a permanent switch in January 2019.

Afobe was part of the England squad that won the 2010 UEFA European Under-17 Championship in May 2010.

== Early life ==
Afobe was born in Leyton, London, to Malagasy and Congolese roots, and grew up in Dagenham where he attended Monteagle Primary School and the Jo Richardson Community School. He joined the Arsenal Academy when he was six; he was playing for Sunday league team Eclipse FC in Dagenham when he was spotted by an Arsenal scout – Gary Nott. He joined Arsenal on 1 May 2001. He scored 40 goals for the U-16s in 2007–08, 11 goals in 13 appearances in 2008–09, and 21 goals in 24 appearances for Arsenal U-18 in 2009–10. He was voted Arsenal's U-18 player of the season.

== Club career ==
=== Arsenal ===
==== Early career ====
Afobe signed a professional contract with Arsenal in February 2010, after reportedly being targeted by Barcelona. The Guardian called him "powerful and pacy" and commented that he "is already being furtively whispered up as the next big thing."

On 2 November 2010, he agreed on terms to join League One club Huddersfield Town on loan until December 2010. He made his debut as a substitute the same night, coming on in the 64th minute for Joe Garner in the 2–0 win over Sheffield Wednesday at Hillsborough Stadium. After the game, Huddersfield manager Lee Clark praised Afobe, calling him "another fantastic young player from the Arsenal production line." Afobe scored his first goals in professional football as Huddersfield beat Rotherham United 5–2 away from home in the Football League Trophy. He made it 3–1 with a clinical header inside the box, before finishing off the scoring with a well-taken finish in the second half.

Following a broken leg to Anthony Pilkington, Afobe got an extended run in the Huddersfield starting line-up in the second half of the season which saw him pick up four Man of the Match awards in a row, which also included 5 goals and a number of important assists, taking Huddersfield's unbeaten record from December to 24 league games. Despite his and Huddersfield's great form, they narrowly missed out on automatic promotion and lost in the final of the play-offs. In total he made 32 appearances with 8 goals and 10 assists for the Terriers.

Afobe impressed on his first-team debut for Arsenal in the 2011 Emirates Cup against American side New York Red Bulls. He came on for the injured Jack Wilshere on 7 minutes, however he was then substituted on 74 minutes for Andrey Arshavin as he had a groin injury. Afobe made his return from injury in August for the Reserves in a 2–1 win against Man Utd Reserves, however went off after just 22 minutes, ruling the striker out for over six months. Afobe made a goalscoring return for the Reserves in a 5–0 win against Norwich Reserves on 21 February, entering the field as a first-half substitute. Afobe also missed a penalty in the match.

==== Later career ====
On 22 March 2012, Afobe agreed to join Championship club Reading on loan until the end of the season, and made three appearances in the side that secured the Championship title and promotion to the Premier League.

On 3 August 2012, Football League Championship club Bolton Wanderers confirmed that Afobe had joined on a season-long loan. Afobe made his debut the following day, coming on as a substitute in Bolton's 3–0 friendly defeat at Portsmouth. On 7 August, he scored a hat trick in Bolton's penultimate pre-season friendly as they beat Tranmere Rovers 3–1. He made his competitive debut on 18 August, coming on as a second-half substitute for Kevin Davies, in Bolton's 2–0 defeat at Burnley. After making two more substitute appearances, he made his starting debut in the League Cup defeat at Crawley Town on 28 August, scoring in the process. His first league goal for Bolton came on 23 October as he scored the first in a 2–2 draw against Wolverhampton Wanderers. On 31 January 2013, Bolton cut short his deal and he returned to Arsenal.

On 8 February 2013, Afobe joined Millwall on loan until the end of the season, but that deal was cancelled one month later due to a knee injury and he returned to Arsenal and underwent surgery.

Afobe returned from injury in late October 2013, after an eight-month period on the sidelines. He scored the only goal on his return to action in a win for an Arsenal XI against the Nike Academy.

On 30 January 2014, Afobe joined Sheffield Wednesday for the rest of the 2013–14 campaign. Afobe made his debut, in a 1–0 win over Barnsley on 1 February 2014. He then scored his first goal and set up a goal in the next game, in a 2–0 win over Reading. He then scored his second goal of the season on 29 March 2014, in a 4–1 loss against Watford. After making twelve appearances and scoring twice, it announced that Afobe returned to Arsenal as a result of his conclusion on his loan spell at Sheffield Wednesday.

Afobe joined MK Dons on loan until the end of the season. Afobe made his debut for the club, at 2–2 in an eventual 4–2 win over Gillingham on the opening day of the 2014–15 season. Afobe then scored his first league goal for the club, in a 1–0 win over Chesterfield on 19 August 2014.

Afobe then scored two goals in a 4–0 win over Manchester United in the League Cup second round after coming on as a substitute. In third round, he scored two more goals to help his team to pass Bradford City and reach the fourth round. On 29 November, Afobe scored a hat trick in a 6–0 win over Colchester United.

=== Wolverhampton Wanderers ===
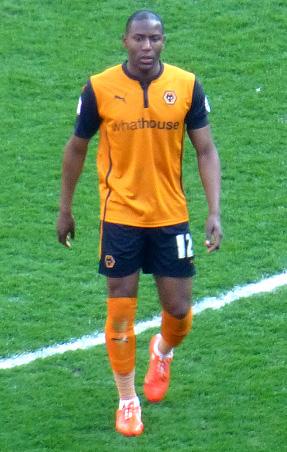
Afobe playing for Wolverhampton Wanderers in 2015

On 14 January 2015, Afobe signed a three-and-a-half-year deal with Championship side Wolverhampton Wanderers for a reported £2 million, and was assigned the number 12 shirt, which was previously used by loanees Yannick Sagbo and Danny Graham. He scored in his debut for the club three days after signing, entering as a substitute for James Henry and walking the ball into the net in added time to confirm a 2–0 home win against Blackpool. He ended the season having scored 13 goals during 21 appearances for Wolves, but the team was denied a play-off place by goal difference.

Afobe scored the opening goal of the season for his club in a 2–1 win away to Blackburn Rovers. As the summer 2015 transfer window drew to a close, he was the subject of interest from newly promoted Premier League club Norwich City, who reportedly entered a series of bids. In response, Wolves issued a statement to say that "neither Benik nor any of Wolves' first team forward players, will be sold this season". Afobe remained a Wolves player at the close of the summer transfer window and went on to score 10 goals before the turn of the year. During the January transfer window, Afobe again attracted interest from the Premier League with Bournemouth's bid of a reported £10 million ultimately being accepted.

In the aftermath of Afobe's departure, Wolves' head of football development and recruitment Kevin Thelwell told fans: "Benik was no longer trying to play for us. That was undermining everything we were trying to achieve"; chief executive Jez Moxey added that "[Afobe] insisted on moving. We were forced into doing a deal that we didn't want to do". Afobe himself responded via social media: "I did my best. It was hard for us all. I asked to leave but only because I wanted to play in the Premier League, but I never told my team-mates or disrupted the changing room".

=== Bournemouth ===
On 10 January 2016, after numerous attempts to sign him, Afobe joined Bournemouth on a four-and-a-half-year deal for an undisclosed fee reported to be a club record £10 million.

He made his debut two days later, starting in a 3–1 loss to West Ham United at Dean Court. Despite missing good opportunities to score, manager Eddie Howe said of his new signing: "The pleasing thing was that he was at the end of those chances and we know with his quality he'll put them away." In his next game on 16 January, Afobe scored his first Bournemouth and Premier League goal, putting in Charlie Daniels' cross to open a 3–0 home win over Norwich City.

=== Return to Wolverhampton Wanderers ===
On 1 February 2018, Afobe rejoined Wolverhampton Wanderers on loan until the end of the 2017–18 season. On 7 March 2018, Afobe scored his first goal back in the Wolves shirt, in a 3–0 victory against Leeds United at Elland Road, with Afobe lobbing the ball over on-rushing Leeds goalkeeper Bailey Peacock-Farrell to score Wolves' third of the night. He scored six goals in 16 appearances as Wolves won the Championship title, gaining promotion to the Premier League. On 1 June, Afobe would sign with Wolves on a permanent deal, for a fee of £10 million. However it was reported that Wolves would be willing to let Afobe leave to make a quick profit of £2 million.

=== Stoke City ===
On 12 June 2018, Afobe joined Stoke City on a six-month loan but with an obligation to purchase him for a reported fee of £12 million in January 2019. He made his Stoke debut on 5 August 2018 against Leeds United, scoring a penalty in a 3–1 defeat. Afobe and Stoke struggled in the 2018–19 season with the team failing to mount a promotion challenge ending up in 16th position. Afobe ended as top goalscorer with only nine goals from 49 appearances. After returning to pre-season training in June 2019, Afobe said that he has lost weight and improved his training methods. However, after a poor performance in the opening day of the season against Queens Park Rangers, manager Nathan Jones decided to bring in Scott Hogan on loan.

On 8 August 2019, Afobe joined Bristol City on loan for the 2019–20 season. After scoring three goals in five games for the Robins, Afobe suffered an Anterior cruciate ligament injury in training, initially ruling him out for the remainder of the 2019–20 season. However, due to the season being interrupted by the COVID-19 pandemic, which saw the season suspended from March to June 2020, Afobe recovered and returned to the first team. He made his first start for the club in 9 months against Sheffield Wednesday on 28 June 2020. The Robins were unable to maintain a challenge for the play-offs and they ended the campaign in 12th position.

On his return to Stoke, Afobe featured heavily in pre-season under Michael O'Neill and played against Blackpool in the first round of the EFL Cup. But he was left out of the squad for the first league match and was linked with another move away from the club. He joined Turkish side Trabzonspor on loan for the 2020–21 season. Afobe played 29 times for Trabzonspor, scoring five goals.

=== Millwall ===
On 2 July 2021, Afobe rejoined fellow Championship side Millwall on a season-long loan deal eight years after his previous loan spell at the club. He scored his first goal for Millwall in a 2–1 defeat to Fulham on 17 August 2021. Afobe scored 13 goals in 41 appearances for the Lions as they missed out on a play-off spot on the final day of the season, finishing in 9th.

Following the success of his loan spell with the club in the 2021–22 season, Afobe joined the club on a permanent one-year deal for an undisclosed fee on 28 June 2022. On 5 January 2023, having scored twice in nineteen appearances, Afobe terminated his contract by mutual consent.

=== Hatta ===
On 9 January 2023, Afobe joined UAE First Division League club Hatta on a free transfer. He opened the scoring in 3–1 victory against Dubai City F.C. on his debut for the club.

== International career ==
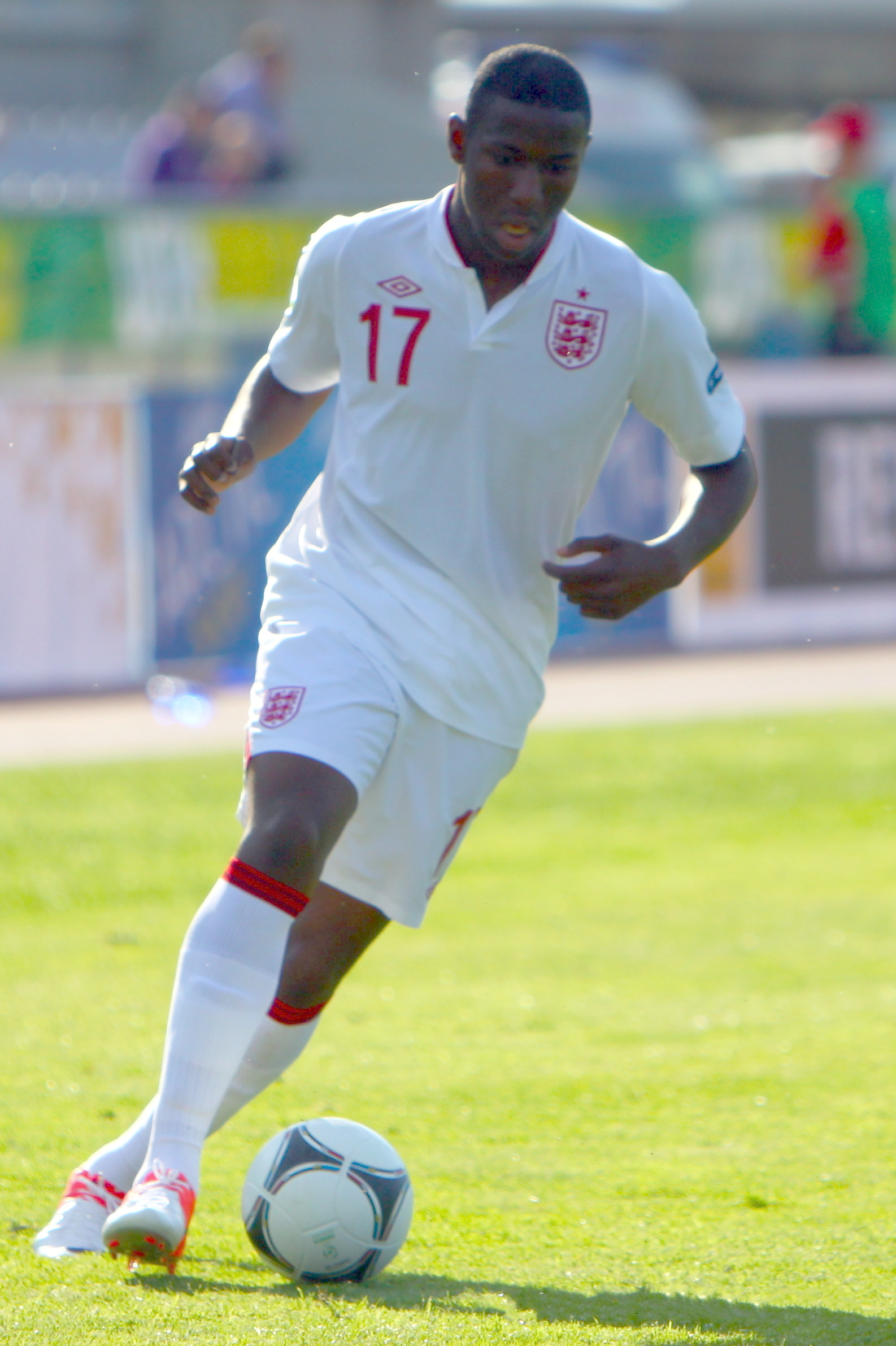
Afobe playing for England U19s in 2012

=== England youth levels ===
Afobe captained England under-12s at the Junior World Cup in France in 2005. In 2008, Afobe was part of the England under-16 team that won the Victory Shield, scoring four goals in three games. He was also part of the England under-17 squad that won the 2010 UEFA European Under-17 Championship. The Guardian's sports blog called him "among the best of the crop" and "a prolific striker". He joined the England under-19 squad in August 2010.

In June 2011, Afobe was called up to the England under-20 team for the FIFA U-20 World Cup in Colombia. However, he was withdrawn from the squad by Arsenal to join the first team pre-season camp in Germany. Afobe was also called up to replace Manchester United's Danny Welbeck from England U21s in August, however he pulled out due to a groin injury.

On 18 June 2015, he was called up to replace injured Saido Berahino at the 2015 UEFA European Under-21 Championship.

=== Democratic Republic of the Congo ===
Afobe also qualified to represent DR Congo through his parents. He was called up to the DR Congo national team, for 2017 Africa Cup of Nations qualification matches against Angola in March 2016. In November 2016, Afobe revealed that he had not yet been able to make an appearance for DR Congo due to a hold up with the paperwork. In January 2017, Afobe pulled out of the 2017 Africa Cup of Nations to focus on breaking into the starting XI at Bournemouth.

Afobe scored on his debut for DR Congo in a 2–0 friendly win over Botswana on 5 June 2017.

== Personal life ==
Afobe is of Malagasy and DR Congolese descent and has two daughters with his partner Lois. He had a daughter named Amora, who died in November 2019 at the young age of two. Amora died in hospital due to her unexpectedly having sepsis.

He has another daughter, who is named Alba who at the time of her older sister's death was only one year old.

Afobe is a Christian.

== Career statistics ==
=== Club ===
As of matches played 30 June 2025

Appearances and goals by club, season and competition
| Club | Season | League | | | National cup | | League cup | | Other | | Total | |
| Club | Season | Division | Apps | Goals | Apps | Goals | Apps | Goals | Apps | Goals | Apps | Goals |
|---|---|---|---|---|---|---|---|---|---|---|---|---|
| Arsenal | 2010–11 | Premier League | 0 | 0 | 0 | 0 | 0 | 0 | 0 | 0 | 0 | 0 |
| Arsenal | 2011–12 | Premier League | 0 | 0 | 0 | 0 | 0 | 0 | 0 | 0 | 0 | 0 |
| Arsenal | 2012–13 | Premier League | 0 | 0 | 0 | 0 | 0 | 0 | 0 | 0 | 0 | 0 |
| Arsenal | 2013–14 | Premier League | 0 | 0 | 0 | 0 | 0 | 0 | 0 | 0 | 0 | 0 |
| Arsenal | 2014–15 | Premier League | 0 | 0 | 0 | 0 | 0 | 0 | 0 | 0 | 0 | 0 |
| Arsenal | Total | | 0 | 0 | 0 | 0 | 0 | 0 | 0 | 0 | 0 | 0 |
| Huddersfield Town (loan) | 2010–11 | League One | 28 | 5 | 3 | 1 | 0 | 0 | 4 (Note: One appearance and two goals in EFL Trophy and three in League One play-offs) | 2 | 35 | 8 |
| Reading (loan) | 2011–12 | Championship | 3 | 0 | 0 | 0 | 0 | 0 | — | | 3 | 0 |
| Bolton Wanderers (loan) | 2012–13 | Championship | 20 | 2 | 2 | 0 | 1 | 1 | — | | 23 | 3 |
| Millwall (loan) | 2012–13 | Championship | 5 | 0 | 0 | 0 | 0 | 0 | — | | 5 | 0 |
| Sheffield Wednesday (loan) | 2013–14 | Championship | 12 | 2 | 1 | 0 | 0 | 0 | — | | 13 | 2 |
| Milton Keynes Dons (loan) | 2014–15 | League One | 22 | 10 | 3 | 2 | 4 | 6 | 1 (Note: Appearance in Football League Trophy) | 1 | 30 | 19 |
| Wolverhampton Wanderers | 2014–15 | Championship | 21 | 13 | 0 | 0 | 0 | 0 | — | | 21 | 13 |
| Wolverhampton Wanderers | 2015–16 | Championship | 25 | 9 | 0 | 0 | 2 | 1 | — | | 27 | 10 |
| Wolverhampton Wanderers | Total | | 46 | 22 | 0 | 0 | 2 | 1 | 0 | 0 | 48 | 23 |
| Bournemouth | 2015–16 | Premier League | 15 | 4 | 0 | 0 | 0 | 0 | — | | 15 | 4 |
| Bournemouth | 2016–17 | Premier League | 31 | 6 | 0 | 0 | 2 | 0 | — | | 33 | 6 |
| Bournemouth | 2017–18 | Premier League | 17 | 0 | 2 | 0 | 3 | 1 | — | | 22 | 1 |
| Bournemouth | Total | | 63 | 10 | 2 | 0 | 5 | 1 | — | | 70 | 11 |
| Wolverhampton Wanderers (loan) | 2017–18 | Championship | 16 | 6 | 0 | 0 | 0 | 0 | — | | 16 | 6 |
| Wolverhampton Wanderers | 2018–19 | Premier League | 0 | 0 | 0 | 0 | 0 | 0 | — | | 0 | 0 |
| Stoke City | 2018–19 | Championship | 45 | 8 | 2 | 0 | 2 | 1 | — | | 49 | 9 |
| Stoke City | 2019–20 | Championship | 1 | 0 | 0 | 0 | 0 | 0 | — | | 1 | 0 |
| Stoke City | 2020–21 | Championship | 0 | 0 | 0 | 0 | 1 | 0 | — | | 1 | 0 |
| Stoke City | 2021–22 | Championship | 0 | 0 | 0 | 0 | 0 | 0 | — | | 0 | 0 |
| Stoke City | Total | | 46 | 8 | 2 | 0 | 3 | 1 | — | | 51 | 9 |
| Bristol City (loan) | 2019–20 | Championship | 12 | 3 | 0 | 0 | 0 | 0 | — | | 12 | 3 |
| Trabzonspor (loan) | 2020–21 | Süper Lig | 28 | 5 | 0 | 0 | — | | 1 (Note: Appearance in Turkish Super Cup) | 0 | 29 | 5 |
| Millwall (loan) | 2021–22 | Championship | 38 | 12 | 1 | 1 | 2 | 0 | — | | 41 | 13 |
| Millwall | 2022–23 | Championship | 19 | 2 | 0 | 0 | 0 | 0 | — | | 19 | 2 |
| Millwall | Total | | 57 | 14 | 1 | 1 | 2 | 0 | — | | 60 | 15 |
| Hatta | 2022–23 | UAE First Division League | 17 | 9 | 0 | 0 | 0 | 0 | — | | 17 | 9 |
| Al Dhafra | 2023–24 | UAE First Division League | 15 | 12 | 1 | 0 | 0 | 0 | — | | 16 | 12 |
| Mesaimeer | 2024–25 | Qatari Second Division | 2 | 0 | 0 | 0 | 0 | 0 | — | | 2 | 0 |
| Career total | | | 392 | 108 | 15 | 4 | 18 | 10 | 6 | 3 | 431 | 125 |

=== International ===
As of match played 13 October 2018

Appearances and goals by national team and year
| National team | Year | Apps | Goals |
|---|---|---|---|
| DR Congo | 2017 | 2 | 1 |
| DR Congo | 2018 | 4 | 0 |
| Total | | 6 | 1 |

As of match played 5 June 2017
Scores and results list DR Congo's goal tally first, score column indicates score after each Afobe goal.

List of international goals scored by Benik Afobe
| No. | Date | Venue | Cap | Opponent | Score | Result | Competition |
|---|---|---|---|---|---|---|---|
| 1 | 5 June 2017 | Sports Center of FAR, Rabat, Morocco | 1 | Botswana | 1–0 | 2–0 | Friendly |

== Honours ==
Arsenal Youth

- Premier Academy League: 2009–10

Milton Keynes Dons

- Football League One runner-up: 2014–15

Wolverhampton Wanderers

- EFL Championship: 2017–18

Trabzonspor

- Turkish Super Cup: 2020

England U17

- UEFA European Under-17 Championship: 2010

Individual

- UEFA European Under-17 Championship Team of the Tournament: 2010
- AFC Bournemouth Community Player of the Season: 2016–17
