= Al-Hilal United FC =

Emirati asscoication football club

Al-Hilal United الهلال يونايتد
- Full name: Al-Hilal United Football Club نادي الهلال يونايتد لكرة القدم
- Nickname: The hawks
- Founded: 2019; 7 years ago
- Dissolved: 2025; 1 year ago
- Ground: The Sevens Stadium
- Capacity: 44,000
- Owner: Abdullah bin Musa'ad bin Abdulaziz Al Saud
- Manager: Shabeer Mannaril
- League: UAE Second Division League
- 2022–23: 8th
Home colours	Away colours

Al-Hilal United Football Club (Arabic: نادي الهلال يونايتد لكرة القدم), or simply Al Hilal United, is an Emirati professional football club, based in the city of Al Lisaili, Dubai. Founded in 2019, the club competes in the UAE Second Division League.

== History ==
Al-Hilal United FC was founded in 2019 in Al Lisaili, Dubai, United Arab Emirates, and around February 2020, it was announced that Abdullah bin Musa'ad bin Abdulaziz Al Saud has ownership to the newly established club.

The club began their journey through competing in the UAE Second Division League, the third tier of Emirati football, during the 2019–20 season. They ended the following season on fifth position with 23 points in 17 matches.

In the 2020–21 UAE Division 2 season, they achieved success and qualified for the play-offs after finishing on top of Group A with 32 points in 14 matches. Later their journey came to an end after losing 9–0 to Abtal Al Khaleej.

On 31 March 2022, Al-Hilal United hosted AFC Champions League debutant Mumbai City in a friendly game, that ended as a 2–0 defeat for the hawks.

== Home stadium ==
Al-Hilal used The Sevens Stadium in Dubai for their home games during their earlier seasons. In 2021–22 season, Al Hilal rented a pitch at Al Hamriya Sports Club Stadium to play for their home fixtures as The Sevens had too many teams using it as their home base.

== Current squad ==
As of 2023–24 season:

Note: Flags indicate national team as defined under FIFA eligibility rules; some limited exceptions apply. Players may hold more than one non-FIFA nationality.

No.	Pos.	Nation	Player
1	GK	ZIM	Malcolm Mapondera
3	MF	GHA	Sumaila Mahama
4	MF	TAN	Othuman Mwambungu
5	DF	GHA	Bernard Abbey
6	MF	TAN	Kareem Mlacha
7	FW	CMR	Fru Frank
8	MF	ALG	Elhadj Mebarki
9	MF	KEN	Suleiman Abdul
10	FW	GHA	Lordson Ofori
11	FW	BRA	Otavio de Castro

No.	Pos.	Nation	Player
12	FW	NGR	Precious Daniel
13	GK	SDN	Ahmed Mohamed
17	FW	GHA	Theo Sackey
23	DF	UGA	Tonny Kyagaba
30	MF	ERI	Mohamed Adem
32	MF	GHA	Emmanuel Junior
54	DF	TAN	Rajabu Zahiri
55	DF	GHA	Eugene Atobrah
70	FW	UAE	Ali Al Ameeri
77	MF	YEM	Emad Abdulhabeeb
80	MF	UGA	Brian Mugisha

== Coaching staff ==
Position	Name
Head coach	(Russia) Mohamed Latif
Assistant coach	(India) Suneer VP
Assistant coach	(India) Jishar Shibu
Physical coach	(India) Adhith KJ

== Affiliated clubs ==
The following clubs are currently affiliated with:

- (England) Sheffield United F.C. (2020–2024)
- (India) Kerala United FC (2020–present)
- (Belgium) K Beerschot VA (2020–present)
- (France) LB Châteauroux (2021–present)

== See also ==
- List of football clubs in the United Arab Emirates
