= Sultan Husain =

Emirati footballer (born 1995)

Sultan Husain سلطان حسين
Personal information
- Full name: Sultan Husain Khamis Al-Ehremi
- Date of birth: 17 September 1995 (age 31)
- Place of birth: Emirates
- Height: 1.81 m (5 ft 11 in)
- Position: Fullback

Team information
- Current team: Al Dhafra
- Number: 12

Youth career
- 2006–2011: Al Rams
- 2011–2015: Emirates Club

Senior career*
Years	Team	Apps	(Gls)
2015–2020	Emirates Club	29	(0)
2020–2022	Baniyas	9	(0)
2022–2023	Al Urooba		
2023–	Al Dhafra		
- * Club domestic league appearances and goals

Sultan Husain (Arabic:سلطان حسين) (born 17 September 1995) is an Emirati footballer. He currently plays as a fullback for Al Dhafra.

== Career ==
=== Youth career ===
Sultan Husain started his career at Al Rams and is a product of the Al Rams's youth system. and joined the youth Emirates Club in 2011 .

=== Emirates Club ===
On 8 May 2016, Sultan Husain made his professional debut for Emirates Club against Al Ain in the Pro League.

=== Baniyas ===
On 24 May 2020, he left Emirates Club and signed with Baniyas.
