= Mutaz Abdulla =

Emirati footballer (born 1974)

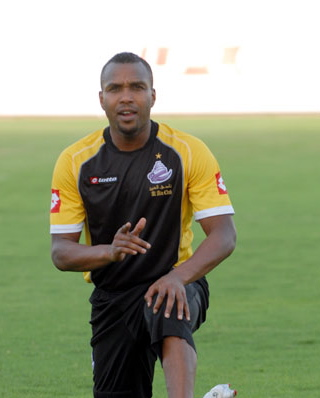

Personal information
- Full name: Mutaz Abdulla Mohammed Abdulla
- Date of birth: 8 November 1974 (age 52)
- Place of birth: Al Ain, United Arab Emirates
- Height: 1.91 m (6 ft 3 in)
- Position: Goalkeeper

Youth career
- Al Sadd

Senior career*
Years	Team	Apps	(Gls)
1998–2009	Al Ain	212	(0)
2009–2012	Al Wahda	24	(0)
2012–2013	Emirates	26	(0)
2013–2014	Al-Shaab	13	(0)
2014	Ajman	15	(0)

International career
2000–2006	UAE	25	(0)

Managerial career
- 2020–2021: Abtal Al Khaleej
- 2021–2022: Al Jazirah Al Hamra
- 2023: Al Bataeh (assistant)
- 2023: Al Rams
- * Club domestic league appearances and goals

Mutaz Abdulla (Arabic: معتز عبد الله) is an Emirati veteran goalkeeper for Al-Shaab. He previously represented the UAE national team on 25 occasions.

== Career ==
Born in the United Arab Emirates, Abdulla is of Sudanese descent. He started off in the youth teams of Al Sadd in Doha, Qatar, where he grew up. He joined Al Ain in 1998 and was one of the three goalkeepers for the team. Honors he has received with Al Ain include the AFC Champions league trophy.

== Honors ==
- UAE League Titles: 99/2000, 2001/2002, 2002/2003, 2003/2004
- UAE Presidents Cup: 1998/1999, 2000/2001, 2004/2005, 2005/2006, 2008/2009
- UAE FA Cup: 2004/2005, 2005/2006
- AFC Champions League: 2003
- UAE Super Cup: 2002/2003
- Etisalat Emirates Cup 2008/2009
