= Ismail Al-Zaabi =

Emirati association football player (born 2001)

Ismail Al-Zaabi إسماعيل الزعابي
Personal information
- Full name: Ismail Omar Sultan Al-Zaabi
- Date of birth: 14 July 2001 (age 25)
- Place of birth: Emirates
- Height: 1.66 m (5 ft 5 in)
- Position: Midfielder

Team information
- Current team: Dubai City
- Number: 18

Youth career
- –2019: Al-Wahda

Senior career*
Years	Team	Apps	(Gls)
2019–2023	Al-Wahda	7	(0)
2023	→ Al-Dhafra (loan)	6	(0)
2023–2024	Al Bataeh	1	(0)
2024–2025	Dibba Al-Hisn	1	(0)
2025–	Dubai City	0	(0)

International career
- U20 UAE
- * Club domestic league appearances and goals

Ismail Omar Sultan Al-Zaabi (Arabic:إسماعيل الزعابي) (born 14 July 2001) is an Emirati footballer. He currently plays for UAE First Division League club Dubai City as a midfielder.

== Career ==
Al-Zaabi started his career at Al-Wahda and is a product of the Al-Wahda's youth system. On 18 October 2019, It has been suspended 4 matches due to his absence from U20 UAE camp without prior excuse . On 11 December 2019, Al-Zaabi made his professional debut for Al-Wahda against Shabab Al-Ahli in the Pro League .
