= Royal FC Dubai =

Royal FC
- Nickname: The Kingsmen
- Founded: 2021; 5 years ago
- Stadium: Al Hamra Stadium
- Capacity: 2,000
- Owner: Mohamed Boghdady
- Head coach: Park Jae-hong
- League: UAE Second Division League
- 2023–24: SDL, 4th
- Website: www.royalfc.club

Royal FC is a professional football club based in Dubai, United Arab Emirates. The club was founded in 2021 and competes in the UAE 2nd Division.

== History ==
Royal FC quickly rose through the ranks of UAE football, starting in the UAE Third Division League and winning the championship to secure promotion to the 2nd Division in their inaugural 2022–23 season. In the following season, they were contenders for promotion to the 1st Division, narrowly missing out by a few points. Notable achievements include producing the highest goal scorer in their division, Ousseynou Tall, who has prior experience in the Argentine Primera División.

The club was featured in the 40th edition of the Sikkim Gold Cup in November 2024 held in Gangtok, Sikkim, India.

== Team roster ==
The squad of the team as of May 2024 is as follows.

Note: Flags indicate national team as defined under FIFA eligibility rules; some limited exceptions apply. Players may hold more than one non-FIFA nationality.

No.	Pos.	Nation	Player
1	MF	BEL	Ahmed Sameer Habibzai
2	FW	CHA	Bobandi Lakein
3	MF	GHA	David Agormeda
4	MF	SEN	Dieme Gerard
5	FW	SEN	Dieng Cheikh
6	DF	CIV	Doukoure Dylan
7	GK	EGY	Islam Abouelmagd
8	DF	MAR	Jihad Alghandour
9	DF	CMR	Landry Kamwa
10	FW	EGY	Mahmoud Ali
11	GK	EGY	Ahmed Elboghdady

No.	Pos.	Nation	Player
12	DF	CIV	Mickael Gnamien
13	MF	EGY	Mohamed Elagamy
14	MF	EGY	Mostafa gomaa
15	MF	SEN	Ndiaye Diop
16	MF	CIV	Ness Wilfried Meless
17	MF	ITA	Nicola Zagaria
18	FW	CIV	Nurudeen Salami
19	DF	EGY	Omar Hassan Ahmed
20	FW	EGY	Omar Ezat Ahmed
21	FW	SEN	Ousseynou Tall
22	FW	LBR	Sanney Geleya Carlos

player|no=74|nat=Egypt|pos=DF|name=Mahmoud amiin}} {{Football squad

== Honours ==
- UAE Third Division League
  - Champions (1): 2022-2023
- All India Governor's Gold Cup
  - Quarter-Finals: 2024
