= Othman Al-Hamour =

Emirati association football player (born 1992)

Othman Al-Hamour عثمان الهامور
Personal information
- Full name: Othman Salem Al-Hamour Al-Shamsi
- Date of birth: 22 March 1992 (age 34)
- Place of birth: Emirates
- Height: 1.74 m (5 ft 9 in)
- Position: Right-back

Team information
- Current team: Al Arabi

Youth career
- Al-Sharjah
- Al-Wahda

Senior career*
Years	Team	Apps	(Gls)
2012–2013	Al-Wahda	12	(0)
2013–2016	Al-Wasl	4	(0)
2016–2024	Al-Hamriyah		
- * Club domestic league appearances and goals

Othman Al Hamour (Arabic:عثمان الهامور) (born 22 March 1992) is an Emirati footballer. He currently plays as a right back .

== Career ==
Al-Hamour started his career at Al-Sharjah and is a product of the Al-Sharjah's youth system, he moved to the Al-Wahda's youth . On 29 September 2012, Al-Hamour made his professional debut for Al-Wahda against Al-Shabab in the Pro League . On 22 September 2013, left Al-Wahda and signed with Al-Wasl. On 22 November 2013, Al-Hamour made his professional debut for Al-Wasl against Al-Shabab in the Pro League . On Season 2016, signed with Al-Hamriyah.
