= Fleetwood United F.C. =

Football club in UAE

Fleetwood United FC
- Full name: Fleetwood United Football Club
- Nickname: The Dubai Cods
- Founded: 2021; 5 years ago
- Dissolved: 2024; 2 years ago
- League: UAE Second Division League
- 2022–23: 2nd
Home colours	Away colours

Fleetwood United Football Club (Arabic: فليتوود يونايتد) was an association football club based in Jebel Ali, United Arab Emirates. It was established as a sister club of the English side Fleetwood Town, in which it served as an academy that scouts players and youth talents across the city of Dubai.

== History ==
Fleetwood United was founded in 2021 as part of Andrew Pilley's expansion. The club won promotion to the UAE Second Division League after finishing second in the UAE Third Division League.

In 2023–24 season the club won the UAE Second Division League, getting the victory in 20 out of 26 league games. In September 2024, English club Fleetwood Town announced the sale of the team to the GIE Dubai Group, officially ending all collaboration between the two organizations.

== See also ==
- List of football clubs in the United Arab Emirates
