= Liwa FC =

Emirati professional football club

Liwa ليوا
- Full name: Liwa Football Club نادي ليوا لكرة القدم
- Founded: 2020; 5 years ago
- Dissolved: 2022; 3 years ago
- League: UAE Second Division League
- 2021–22: 7th
- Website: https://liwafc.ae/
Home colours	Away colours

Liwa Football Club (Arabic: نادي ليوا لكرة القدم) was an Emirati professional football club based in Al Dhafra, Abu Dhabi.

== History ==
Liwa FC was founded in 2020 by Ibrahim Selim and started their first season in that same year in the UAE Second Division. They would also start a youth program in 2021 to develop the club further. Former Egyptian goalkeeper Essam El Hadary announced his administration towards the club with the goal to provide it with players and technical staff.

== See also ==
- List of football clubs in the United Arab Emirates
