= Arabian Falcons FC =

Emirati football club

- Full name: Arabian Falcons Football Club
- Founded: 2023; 3 years ago
- Head coach: Jonjo Shelvey
- League: UAE Second Division League
- 2023–24: UAE Third Division League, Champions (promoted)
- Website: https://arabianfalconsfc.com/

Arabian Falcons Football Club is an Emirati football club located in Dubai, that currently plays in the UAE Second Division League.

== History ==
Arabian Falcons was founded in 2023 to work with young African footballers to help grow their football careers and help them to reach European leagues. Ahead of their first season in the fourth tier UAE Third Division League, they reached a sponsorship agreement with Nando's, a South African multinational fast casual chain, who would provide weekly pre-match meals to the team, amounting to a total of 72 meals each week, while also allowing the young African players on the team complementary dining at all Nando's restaurants. The club won the Third Division championship in 2023–24, compiling 26 wins, 3 draws, and no losses, earning promotion to the third tier UAE Second Division League for the 2024–25 season.

In 2025, the club made two notable signings, adding former England national team player Jonjo Shelvey and current Jamaica national team midfielder Ravel Morrison. On 15 April 2026, Shelvey announced that he had ended his playing career, taking up the role of head coach of the club.

== Players ==
Note: Flags indicate national team as defined under FIFA eligibility rules; some limited exceptions apply. Players may hold more than one non-FIFA nationality.

No.	Pos.	Nation	Player
—	MF	JAM	Ravel Morrison
—	DF	ENG	Danny Simpson

No.	Pos.	Nation	Player
—	MF	UAE	
—	MF	BRA	

== Honors ==
- Winners UAE Third division: 2025-2026
