= Laval United FC =

Emirati professional football club

Laval لافال
- Full name: Laval United Football Club نادي لافال يونايتد لكرة القدم
- Founded: 2020; 6 years ago (as Al Sahel)
- Dissolved: 2025; 1 year ago
- Ground: Dubai Stadium for People of Determination
- Owner: Yahya Kirdi
- Manager: Wolfgang Rolff; Moustafa Hallak
- League: UAE Second Division League
- 2022–23: 9th
- Website: http://www.lavalunitedfc.com/
| Home colours | Away colours |

Laval United FC (Arabic: نادي لافال يونايتد لكرة القدم) is an Emirati football club based in Al Qusais, Dubai. The club was founded in June 2020 and it plays in the UAE Second Division League.

== History ==
The club was originally founded as Al Sahel and had established operations at Ajman in 2020.

In 2021, the club name was changed from Al Sahel to Laval United FC after Canadian businessman and former football player Yahya Kirdi became the club president. The club was moved to Dubai and the name of the club was changed to Laval after his hometown in Quebec.

== Current squad ==
As of 2023–24 season:

Note: Flags indicate national team as defined under FIFA eligibility rules; some limited exceptions apply. Players may hold more than one non-FIFA nationality.

| No. | Pos. | Nation | Player |
|---|---|---|---|
| 5 | MF | UAE | Hassan Al Blooshi |
| 6 | FW | GHA | Kevin Ngwang |
| 7 | FW | IRN | Iman Mozafari |
| 9 | MF | UAE | Mohammed Mahboob |
| 10 | DF | UAE | Hassan Al Blooshi |
| 11 | MF | UAE | Hamed Al Saedi |
| 12 | FW | IRN | Zoshki Amirhossein |
| 14 | DF | EGY | Mohamed Abdulaziz |
| 17 | FW | CIV | Ibrahim Samba |
| 20 | FW | COL | Juan Londono |
| 21 | DF | GHA | Youssef Al Mhimid |
| 23 | DF | IRN | Hamid Tavakoli |
| 24 | GK | GHA | Abrahim Kpodjie |

| No. | Pos. | Nation | Player |
|---|---|---|---|
| 25 | DF | GHA | Andrews Owusu |
| 30 | FW | COD | Corneille Kasende |
| 40 | FW | GHA | Abraham Odoom |
| 41 | DF | UAE | Eisa Al Blooshi |
| 44 | FW | COD | Jonathan Nsombe |
| 70 | MF | GHA | Mathias Teye |
| 77 | FW | EGY | Mohamed Ellokzi |
| 14 | FW | EGY | Mohamed Naser |
| 80 | FW | GHA | William Forson |
| 90 | GK | EGY | Ahmed Salim |
| 97 | GK | SDN | Mohamed Mutasim |
| 99 | FW | EGY | Ibrahim Eloksh |

== See also ==
- List of football clubs in the United Arab Emirates
