= Hussein Skenderovic =

Australian soccer manager (born 1972)

Personal information
- Date of birth: 11 April 1972 (age 54)
- Place of birth: Australia

Managerial career
- Years: Team
- 2011: St Albans Dinamo
- 2012: Oakleigh Cannons
- 2016: Dandenong Thunder
- 2016–2017: Adelaide United (women)
- 2023: Dibba Al-Hisn

Hussein Skenderovic (born 11 April 1972) is an Australian soccer manager who last managed Dibba Al-Hisn.

== Early life ==
Skenderovic was born in 1972 in Australia. He is of Bosnia and Herzegovina and Croatian descent.

== Career ==
In 2012, he was appointed manager of Australian side Oakleigh Cannons. After that, he was appointed youth manager of Emirati side Ajman. He became the first Australian manager to manage in the United Arab Emirates. In 2016, he was appointed manager of Australian side Dandenong Thunder.

== Management style ==
Skenderovic managed Australian side Adelaide United. He was described as using "route one tactics" while managing the club.

== Personal life ==
Skenderovic can write and read in the Arabic language. He is a native of Melbourne, Australia.
