= Fursan Hispania FC =

Emirati professional football club

Fursan Hispania
- Full name: Fursan Hispania Football Club
- Short name: Al Fursan
- Founded: October 2020; 6 years ago
- Owner(s): Míchel Salgado; Faisal Belhoul
- Manager: Pablo Coira
- League: UAE First Division League
- 2022–23: 16th
- Website: www.fursanhispaniafc.com
Home colours	Away colours

Fursan Hispania Football Club (Arabic: نادي فرسان هسبانيا لكرة القدم) is an Emirati professional football club that started as an academy in Al Sufouh, Dubai. They currently play in the UAE First Division League, after promotion from the Second Division in the 2021–22 season.

== History ==
In 2014, former Real Madrid defender Míchel Salgado founded a football academy to help develop potential footballers in the United Arab Emirates. In 2020, Salgado formed a partnership with Belhoul to form a professional team to join the newly established UAE Second Division League.

They finished in first place in the 2021–22 UAE Division 2, gaining promotion to the UAE First Division League, the second tier of football in the United Arab Emirates.

== Current squad ==
Note: Flags indicate national team as defined under FIFA eligibility rules; some limited exceptions apply. Players may hold more than one non-FIFA nationality.

No.	Pos.	Nation	Player
2	DF	ESP	Alex Cid
3	FW	TUR	Çağrı Karakuş
5	MF	GHA	Raymond Akwasi
7	MF	BRA	Leo Grajau
8	FW	BRA	Sylas
9	GK	GUI	Tasfir Soumah
10	GK	FRA	Matheo Khanfour
11	FW	GEO	Saba Kadagishvii
13	DF	ESP	Adrian Michael Galliani Spetka
14	FW	ESP	Alejandro Cid Prieto
15	MF	LBN	Anthony Khayat
16	DF	BRA	Anthony Lucas Canoa Saraiva
17	MF	ESP	Ares Outeiral Alonso
18	GK	ESP	David Lopez Blanco
19	FW	SDN	Faisal Omer Mohamed Mustafa Alnoor
20	DF	ESP	Gabriel Barao Sanchez Mateos
21	DF	LBN	Gabriel Sabbouh

No.	Pos.	Nation	Player
22	DF	COL	Gustavo Casanova
23	MF	COL	Jefferson Steven Blandon Obando
24	MF	ESP	Jose Miguel Muñoz Ramos
25	MF	BRA	Leonardo Lemos de Araujo
26	GK	ZIM	Malcolm Louis Tendayi Mapondera
27	DF	LBN	Marcel Sabbouh
28	FW	USA	Mark Louis Watson
29	GK	FRA	Matheo Khanfour
30	MF	JPN	Mikito Mukai
33	DF	GHA	Raymond Akwasi Adams
34	DF	JPN	Ren Tominaga
35	MF	ESP	Robert Carril Fernandez]]
36	FW	GEO	Saba Kadagishvili
37	FW	LBN	Samuel El Khoury
38	FW	RUS	Shamil Abdullaev
88	MF	PAN	Martín Morán
97	MF	ITA	Francesco Serafino

== Honours ==
=== Senior ===
- UAE Second Division League
  - Champions (1): 2021–22

=== Youth ===
- Mina Cup (U-16)
  - Winners (1): 2022

== See also ==
- List of football clubs in the United Arab Emirates
