= Forte Virtus FC =

Emirati association football club

Forte Virtus
- Full name: Forte Virtus Football Club
- Short name: FVFC
- Founded: 2020; 6 years ago as Gulf FC; 2025; 1 year ago as Forte Virtus FC
- League: UAE Second Division League
Home colours	Away colours

Forte Virtus Football Club (Arabic: نادي فورت فيرتوس) is an Emirati professional football club based in Mirdif, Dubai. The club plays in the UAE Second Division League. Their colors are white and purple.

== History ==
Founded by The Gulf Heroes LLC, a company that specializes in sports academies, Gulf Football Club competed in their first season in the UAE Second Division League. In their first season, the club won their first title after beating Dubai City 3–0, and were promoted to the UAE First Division League as one of the first privately owned clubs to compete in the second tier.

== Current squad ==
As of the 2022–23 season Note: Flags indicate national team as defined under FIFA eligibility rules; some limited exceptions apply. Players may hold more than one non-FIFA nationality.

No.	Pos.	Nation	Player
3	DF	POR	Mário Rui
6	MF	EGY	Elsaid Radad
8	MF	ENG	Jamie Hopcutt
9	FW	BFA	Kawanlidini Minougou
10	FW	NOR	Adama Diomande
11	MF	EGY	Hazem Mohammed
12	GK	UAE	Omair Al-Hammadi
14	DF	UAE	Rashed Ali
15	MF	GHA	Micheal Agyare
16	MF	UAE	Ahmed Al-Hamed
22	MF	MAR	Ayoub Garbija

No.	Pos.	Nation	Player
23	MF	UAE	Salmeen Salem
24	MF	UAE	Khater Subait
26	MF	ITA	Max Conti
27	MF	GHA	Sadick Hassan
29	DF	UAE	Abdullah Saleh
30	MF	SYR	Mohammed Zainolabdedin
39	GK	UAE	Yousef Eisa
77	FW	UAE	Ali Al-Hammadi
88	MF	UAE	Ahmed Suroor
—	MF	COL	Santiago Tamayo Gómez
—	FW	COL	Kener Valencia

== Honours ==
- UAE Division Two:
  - Champions (1): 2020–21

== See also ==
- List of football clubs in the United Arab Emirates
