= United Sport FC =

Emirati professional football club

United Sport يونايتد سبورت
- Full name: United Sport Club نادي يونايتد سبورت
- Founded: 2020; 6 years ago
- Ground: As-hab Al-Himam Stadium
- Capacity: 1,000
- Owner: Mubarak Al Ketbi
- Manager: Mohamed Farag
- League: UAE Second Division League
- Website: https://unitedf.ae/
Home colours	Away colours

United Sport Football Club (Arabic: نادي يونايتد سبورت لكرة القدم) is an Emirati professional football club based in Al Ain. They currently play in the UAE Second Division League. The club has been sponsored by the Munich Medical Care Foundation since its foundation.

== History ==
United Sport has been acting as an academy for young players since 2012 but with the UAE Second Division League announced, the club used this as an opportunity to start a senior team. Entering its first season in 2020, the club found itself finishing 7th out of 8 teams in its group and continued to struggle the following season. In April 2022, United Sport won the Ramadan football championship which helped them gain a significant amount of support, they would go on to finish 4th in the following season.

== Current squad ==
As of 2023–24 season

Note: Flags indicate national team as defined under FIFA eligibility rules; some limited exceptions apply. Players may hold more than one non-FIFA nationality.

No.	Pos.	Nation	Player
1	GK	ITA	Giulio Ftoni
2	FW	UAE	Saeed Al Saedi
4	DF	NGA	Sunday Ikezue
5	DF	EGY	Ahmed El Deghidi
6	MF	GHA	Saeed Fuseini
7	MF	MLI	Kissima Coulibaly
8	MF	NGA	Imran Fallatah
9	FW	NGA	Patrick Eje
11	MF	UAE	Rashed Al Dhaheri
12	DF	ITA	Mattia Carta
13	MF	COD	Moise Mantuidi
14	FW	GHA	Eric Sam

No.	Pos.	Nation	Player
15	DF	MAR	Mohamed Tourhfist
16	MF	SYR	Omar Jabra
18	MF	GHA	Samuel Azorsu
19	FW	CIV	Jean Kouakou
20	DF	CIV	William Coulibaly
21	FW	CMR	Jean Nama
22	MF	SYR	Abdulrahman Houshan
25	FW	ITA	Nicola Zagaria
27	MF	NGA	Emile Ehon
28	FW	AUS	Daniel Scott
60	GK	YEM	Mohammed Khamis
