= Baynounah SC =

Emirati professional football club

Baynounah بينونة
- Full name: Baynounah Sports Club نادي بينونة الرياضي
- Founded: 2019; 7 years ago as Sport Support
- President: Mohammed Al Mansoori
- Manager: Sultan Al Menhali
- League: UAE Second Division League
- 2022–23: 17th
- Website: https://www.baynounahsc.ae/
Home colours	Away colours

Baynounah Sports Club (Arabic: نادي بينونة الرياضي) is an Emirati professional football club based in Abu Dhabi. It currently plays in UAE First Division League.

== History ==
Founded in 2019 as Sport Support, they competed in the first season of the newly formed Emirati third-tier football league. They beat Al Hazem 2–1 in their first ever competitive match. Despite their good start, they would finish eighth in the league.

In 2020, the club renamed itself Baynounah. They won the Hamdan bin Zayed championship after beating Al Hamra in the semifinal and Bu Hasa in the final by penalty kicks; this victory would help boost the club's profile and garner it significant support in the Al Dhafra region.

== Current squad ==
As of 2023–24 season:

Note: Flags indicate national team as defined under FIFA eligibility rules; some limited exceptions apply. Players may hold more than one non-FIFA nationality.

No.	Pos.	Nation	Player
1	GK	JOR	Daniel Swaidan
2	DF	GHA	Emmanuel Afriyie
3	MF	GHA	Ibrahim Tahiru
4	DF	EGY	Ahmed El Sisi
5	DF	EGY	Eslam Mostafa
6	DF	IRQ	Abdullah Hameed
7	FW	NGA	Ukeme Umoh
9	FW	NGA	Promise Onen
10	MF	MAR	Mohamed Abdelmoula
13	MF	MAR	Elmehdi Boumadiane
15	MF	CIV	Ibrahim Konate
17	MF	JOR	Hadi Masharqa
18	FW	UAE	Omar Heba

No.	Pos.	Nation	Player
19	DF	GHA	Carlos Mensah
22	GK	EGY	Ahmed Gaweech
23	FW	CMR	Ibrahim Konate
28	FW	CMR	Martinez Rengou
48	GK	GHA	Emmanuel Tetteh
74	DF	EGY	Amin Ashraf
77	DF	UAE	Mohamed Al Hosani
80	DF	NGA	Kingsley Salami
88	MF	GHA	Ronald Forson
90	FW	UAE	Mohammed Al Marzooqi
99	FW	UAE	Mohammad Biroumi
—	DF	USA	Adrian Galliani

== See also ==
- List of football clubs in the United Arab Emirates
