= Al Rams Club =

Emirati football club

Al Rams
- Full name: Al Rams Sports Club
- Founded: 1965
- Ground: Al Rams Stadium; Rams, Ras Al Khaimah
- Capacity: 4,000
- Chairman: Ahmed Mohammed bin Jumaa
- Manager: Ali Al Teneiji
- League: UAE Second Division League
- 2025–26: 14th
Home colours

Al Rams Club is a professional football club located in Rams suburb of Ras Al Khaimah, United Arab Emirates. They currently play in the UAE Second Division League.

== Honours ==
- UAE Division One: 2
  - 1975–76, 1980–81

== See also ==
- List of football clubs in the United Arab Emirates
