= Al Lisaili =

Coordinates: 24°54′59.04″N 55°26′39.88″E

Al Lisaili or Al Lesaily is a desert settlement in the emirate of Dubai, United Arab Emirates (UAE) and a centre for the sport of camel racing. In 2015, the settlement had a population of 2,514.

The township, located off the Dubai/Al Ain Highway (E 66), is home to the Al Marmoom Camel Racing Track and contains a large number of camel farms, breeding centres and municipal veterinary services, including the Dubai Camel Market, home to over 130 shops in a sprawl of over 32 buildings. Racing takes place at Al Lisaili between March and October, with the camels bearing automated 'auto-jockeys'. The races host competitors and visitors from around the GCC. Camel riding lessons are also offered to the public at the Arabian Desert Camel Riding Center (ADCRC).

Lisaili is also home to a 15,000m^{2} 'multi-species' abattoir, operated by Dubai Municipality, as well as the Marmoom Heritage Village, home to the annual Al Marmoom Heritage Festival, which takes place in March to April each year. The Dubai Sevens Stadium is located just outside the village on the Dubai side. Lisaili borders the Al Marmoom Desert Conservation Reserve.

Al Lisaili is also home to the desert campus of SkyDive Dubai, a skydiving, parachuting and extreme sports club.
