= Mirdif =

Community in Dubai, United Arab Emirates

Mirdif مِرْدِف
- Community
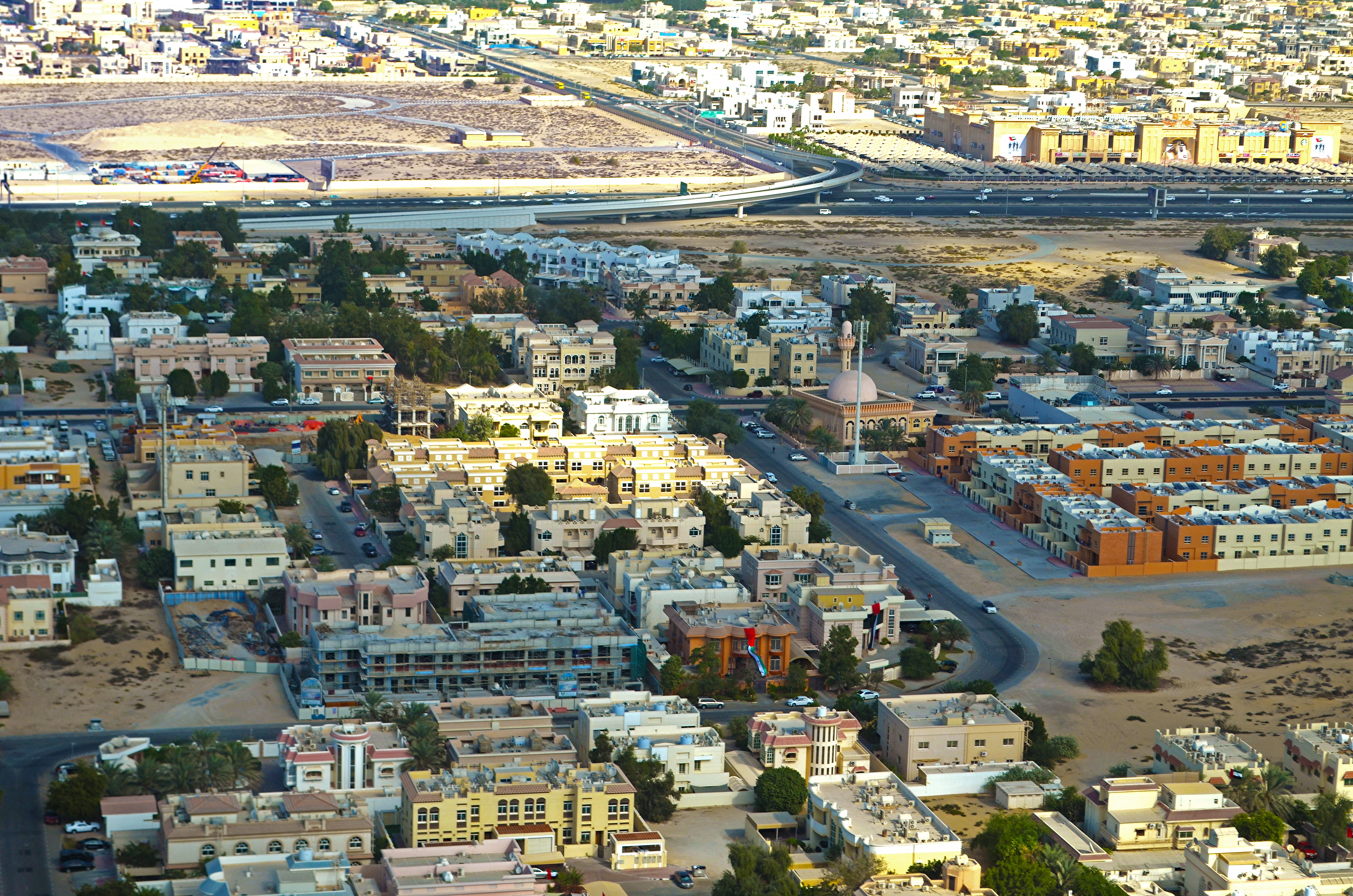
- Aerial view of northwestern Mirdif
- Interactive map of Mirdif
- Coordinates: 25°13′26.54″N 55°25′21.94″E
- Country: United Arab Emirates
- Emirate: Dubai
- City: Dubai

Area
  - Total: 9.2 km^{2} (3.6 sq mi)

Population
  - Total: 37,548
  - Density: 4,100/km^{2} (11,000/sq mi)
- Community number: 251

Mirdif (Arabic: مِرْدِف), sometimes referred to as Mirdiff due to differences in transliteration, is a residential area located in Dubai, the U.A.E. Mirdif has a population of approximately 37,000 and consists mainly of villa developments and or single privately held villas.

== Geography ==
Mirdif borders Al Mizhar from the north and Al Warqaa from the south and is adjacent to the Rashidiya Metro station and Dubai International Airport. To the eastern part of Mirdif is the popular Mushrif Park.

== Sports and Recreation ==
The suburb enjoys a public park at 26b street with basketball, volleyball and tennis courts, as well as a 300-metre walking track, training equipment and extensive play equipment for children. It is open every day from 8:00 to 23:00.

The public Al Mushrif park with a size of more than 15 hectares and trees up to 50 years of age offers outdoor recreation.

== Property developments ==
=== Uptown Mirdif ===
Uptown Mirdif is a property project developed by Union Properties. The project's design is inspired by an ancient spa town. The project features over 2000 villas and flats, restaurants, stores, play areas and recreation facilities, a health care center and a primary school. The entire community is gated, and hence cut off from the rest of Mirdif.

=== Shorooq Community ===
Shorooq Community, situated along Algeria street, is a housing development that consists primarily of 3-4 bedroom villas. The property includes a community club house and is located adjacent to Mushrif Park. Shorooq covers an area of 8,000,000 square feet (740,000 m^{2}). The community features 668 villas, including 236 two-bedroom villas up to 1,961 sq ft., 252 three-bedroom villas up to 3,561 sq ft (330.8 m^{2}) and 180 four-bedroom villas as large as 4,098 sq ft (380.7 m^{2}).

=== Mirdif Hills ===
Mirdif Hills is a mixed-use upmarket and premium residential and commercial development located in the Mirdif area of Dubai, United Arab Emirates. Developed by Dubai Investments Real Estate Company (DIRC), it is the first freehold development in Mirdif, situated adjacent to Mushrif Park and near Dubai International Airport.

The project spans approximately 1 million square metres of land area and includes over 1,500 residential units consisting of studios, one-, two-, and three-bedroom apartments, as well as duplexes. In addition to residential spaces, the development features retail outlets, office spaces, a medical centre, and hospitality facilities. It includes the four-star Millennium Place Hotel, offering 116 rooms and 128 serviced apartments.

Mirdif Hills is organized into three main clusters:

- Janayen Avenue – Primarily residential, offering apartments with views of Mushrif Park and select garden units.
- Nasayem Avenue – The central zone with a mix of apartment types aimed at families.
- Al Multaqa Avenue – A mixed-use cluster containing commercial space, the hotel, and serviced apartments.

In June 2025, Dubai Investments launched a new phase called Asayel Avenue, a 193-apartment addition valued at AED 400 million. It is expected to be completed by the second quarter of 2027.

Amenities in Mirdif Hills include swimming pools, gyms, landscaped gardens, underground parking, high-speed elevators, children’s play areas, 24/7 security, and concierge services.

== Shopping malls ==
Mirdif City Centre is a large shopping mall opened on 16 March 2010. The Mirdif City Centre project was first announced in April 2007 with construction beginning in August 2007. It comprises 3,116,451 sq ft (289,527.8 m^{2}) of gross floor area spread over a service basement level and 1st floor, and 180,000 m^{2} (1,900,000 sq ft) square metres of shopping space.

The mall contains about 465 shops with adjacent 3-level parking for over 7000 cars, a Magic Planet Entertainment zone with an "iFly" indoor skydiving center and Yalla! Bowling, a 12-lane cosmic ten pin bowling attraction. In addition the mall contains A 10-screen cinema featuring two VOX GOLD Premium screens with VOX GOLD lounge and VOX 4DX sensory experience that includes the first “ExtremeScreen” cinema in the UAE as well as fitness gym. Mirdif City Centre houses over 80 restaurants and cafés.

=== Uptown Mirdif ===
Uptown Mirdif is an open-air shopping centre which includes 400,000 sq ft (37,000 m^{2}) of net lettable space. It was the first large shopping complex in Mirdif. It is directly connected to the property development of the same name, and follows the same aesthetic design. There is underground parking connected to Uptown Mirdif, which is divided between tenants and visitors. The centre also has a fitness gym and a food court.

== Religious sites ==
There are mosques in Mirdif spread over the area.

- 83rd street next to West Zone supermarket
- 37th street next to Lifco supermarket
- 15th street next to Pink Mall
- 71st street next to Mirdif Shopping Centre
- Mirdif Grand Mosque (Arabic: جَامِع مِرْدِف ٱلْكَبِيْر, romanized: Jāmiʿ Mirdif Al-Kabīr; 25°13′25.25″N 55°25′39.98″E) on the 47th street next to Uptown Mirdif Park. It is designed in Fatimid architecture.
- 47th street next to Mirdif Hills Avenue
- Ghoroob Mosque
- Shorooq Mosque
- Mosque near Mirdif 35
