= Dubai City FC =

Emirati professional football club

Dubai City
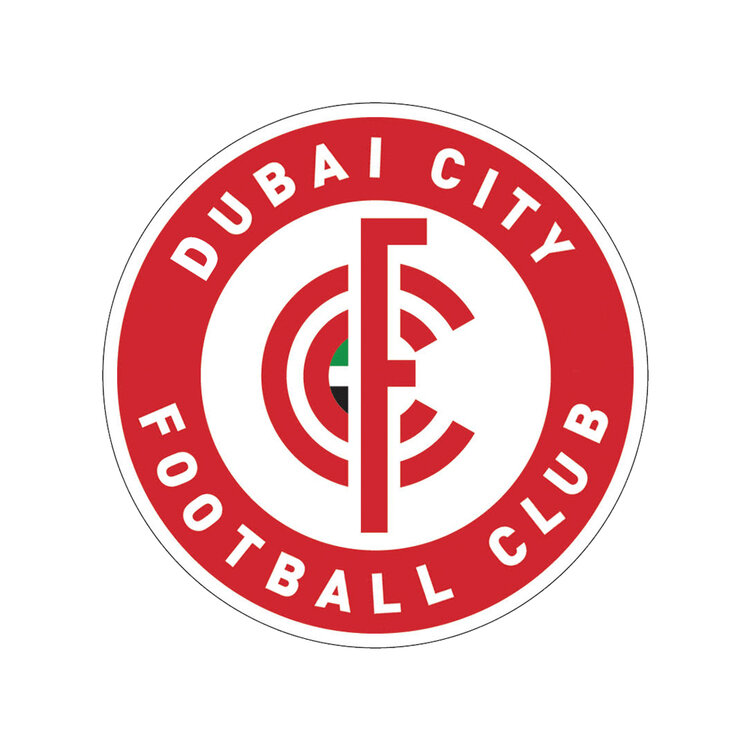
- Full name: Dubai City Football Club
- Nickname: City FC
- Founded: 2018; 8 years ago
- Manager: Michael Rice
- League: UAE First Division League
- 2024–25: 1st, champions
- Website: www.dubaicfc.com
Home colours	Away colours

Dubai City Football Club (Arabic: نادي مدينة دبي لكرة القدم) is a professional football club based in Dubai, United Arab Emirates. The club was founded in 2018 and is owned by Sultan Hareb Al Falahi, a prominent figure in UAE football.

== History ==
The club was established with the aim of promoting football in the UAE and providing a platform for local talent to shine. Since its inception, Dubai City FC has been committed to developing young Emirati players and competing at the highest level in UAE football.

In the 2023-2024 season, the team faced a setback when they were relegated to the UAE Second Division League from the UAE First Division League. However, the club's management and players worked tirelessly to regroup and refocus on their goals.

Under the leadership of manager Michael William Rice, the team made a swift return to the top tier, earning promotion back to the UAE First Division League in the 2024-2025 season.

== Current squad ==
Note: Flags indicate national team as defined under FIFA eligibility rules; some limited exceptions apply. Players may hold more than one non-FIFA nationality.

No.	Pos.	Nation	Player
2	DF	KSA	Yousef Al-Mokhaizim
3	DF	UAE	Khalid Al Ali
4	DF	MAR	Nassim Ziboukh
5	DF	GHA	Faiz Ahmed
6	MF	UAE	Nawaf Fareed
7	MF	UAE	Ahmed Moosa
8	MF	UAE	Abdulla Eisa
9	FW	BRA	Gabriel Fraga
10	MF	NGR	Ideba James
11	FW	UAE	Hamad Al-Dawsari
13	GK	SEN	Djibly Demba
14	FW	GHA	Obedia Gyimah
16	DF	PAK	Ahmed Salman
18	MF	UAE	Ismail Al-Zaabi
19	FW	BRA	José dos Santos
20	DF	LBR	Samuel Snoh
21	MF	UAE	Ammar Al-Kaabi
22	DF	ESP	Pol Ortega
23	DF	UAE	Mohammed Omran
24	MF	ARG	Matías Vásquez
28	MF	SEN	Khalifa Niang
29	DF	CIV	Abraham Guede
30	FW	BRA	Weslley De Oliveira

No.	Pos.	Nation	Player
31	MF	FRA	Ayoub Fouhami
32	MF	ARG	Kevin García
33	DF	MSR	Kaleem Simon
35	DF	UAE	Hussain Ali
40	GK	UAE	Rashed Badr
42	MF	UAE	Amer Al-Ghithi
44	MF	LBR	Darius Payne
55	DF	BRA	João Maranini
66	MF	BRA	Anderson Junior
77	MF	ARG	Federico Frias
80	MF	BEL	Tarik Radi
89	MF	IRL	Abimbola Obasoto
90	FW	SEN	Ibrahima Ba
96	GK	UAE	Khalid Al-Zarouni
—	DF	CIV	Kévin Boli
—	DF	GHA	Mohammed Abdul Basit
—	DF	CAN	Mahmoud Hany
—	DF	BRA	Thiago Barbosa
—	MF	FRA	Oyeli Nguesso
—	MF	UAE	Mansoor Al-Baloushi
—	MF	VAN	Mohamed Eldeeb
—	MF	LBN	Alaa Mezher
—	FW	BRA	Ernane Saldanha
—	FW	GHA	Emmanuel Abban

== Honours ==
- UAE Second Division League
  - Runners-up: 2020–21
- UAE Second Division League
  - Runners-up: 2024–25

== See also ==
- List of football clubs in the United Arab Emirates
