= UAE Second Division League =

- Organising body: UAE Football Association
- Founded: 2019; 7 years ago
- Country: United Arab Emirates
- Confederation: AFC
- Number of clubs: 15
- Level on pyramid: 3
- Promotion to: UAE First Division League
- Relegation to: UAE Third Division League
- Current champions: Palm City FC (1st title) (2025–26)
- Most championships: 7 clubs (1 title each)
- Website: www.uaefa.ae
- Current: 2025–26 season

UAE Second Division League is the third tier of football league competition in the United Arab Emirates. The league is organised by UAE Football Association for private funded clubs and universities with amateur teams. The league was established in 2019. The league featured 10 teams who played each other twice in its first season, however, due to the COVID-19 pandemic in the United Arab Emirates, the UAE footballing season was cancelled.

The UAE FA set a strategy to support featuring more privately owned clubs and football academies in the UAE Football Pyramid. Ahead of the 2022–23 season, the UAE FA confirmed that the format of league will remain as 12 teams, with the introduction of the UAE Third Division League with a promotion-relegation system.

== Current teams ==
As of 2025–26 UAE Second Division League

Note: Table lists clubs in alphabetical order.

Club	Home city	Stadium
Al Fath	Al Jazirah Al Hamra	Al Jazirah Al Hamra Stadium
Al Ittihad	Abu Dhabi	Unknown
Al Rams	Al Rams	Al Rams Stadium
Arabian Falcons	Dubai	Jebel Ali Shooting Club
Fursan Hispania	Dubai (Al Sufouh)	The Sevens Stadium
Baynounah	Al Dhannah	Soccer City Stadium
Forte Virtus	Dubai (Mirdif)	UIS International School
Gulf United B	Dubai (Al Jaddaf)	Dubai Club Stadium
Legentus	Dubai	Unknown
Palm City	Dubai	Unknown
Royal	Dubai (Al Khawaneej)	UIS International
Precision	Jebel Ali	Precision Football - Ibn Battuta Mall- Dubai
Madenat	Dubai	Dubai Club For People Of Determination
United II	Dubai	ISD Stadium Pitch

== List of champions ==
- 2019–20: Quattro
- 2020–21: Abtal Al Khaleej
- 2021–22: Al Fursan
- 2022–23: Gulf United
- 2023–24: Fleetwood United
- 2024–25: Elite Falcons
- 2025–26: Palm City

=== Performance by club ===
Club	Winners	Winning seasons
Quattro	1	2019–20
Abtal Al Khaleej	1	2020–21
Al Fursan	1	2021–22
Gulf United	1	2022–23
Fleetwood United	1	2023–24
Elite Falcons	1	2024–25
Palm City	1	2025–26

=== Performance by city ===
City / Area	Titles	Clubs	Winning seasons
Dubai	4	Abtal Al Khaleej	(1): 2020–21
Dubai	4	Al Fursan	(1): 2021–22
Dubai	4	Gulf United	(1): 2022–23
Dubai	4	Elite Falcons	(1): 2024–25
Ajman	1	Quattro	(1): 2019–20
Jebel Ali	1	Fleetwood United	(1): 2023–24
