= 2023–24 UAE President's Cup =

Tournament details
- Country: United Arab Emirates
- Dates: 2 September 2023 – 17 May 2024
- Teams: 31

Final positions
- Champions: Al-Wasl (3rd title)
- Runners-up: Al Nasr

Tournament statistics
- Matches played: 13
- Goals scored: 42 (3.23 per match)
- Top goal scorer: Adel Taarabt (4 goals)

The 2023–24 UAE President's Cup is the 47th edition of the UAE President's Cup, Sharjah are the defending champions after retaining their title by beating Al Ain.

== Draw dates ==
Round	Draw date	Draw venue	Reference
Preliminary Round	14 August 2023	Abu Dhabi	

== Preliminary round ==
All times are local (UTC+04:00)

=== First round ===
2 September 2023	Gulf United	2–2 (3–4 p)	Dubai United	Al Awir
17:50	Bartley 62', 114'	Report	Bacary 45+4', 108'	Stadium: Al Aweer Stadium

=== Round of 16 ===
14 October 2023	Fujairah	0–1	Dibba Al Fujairah	Fujairah
17:00		Report	Omar 72'	Stadium: Fujairah Stadium

14 October 2023	Masafi	1–2	Al Jazirah Al Hamra	Masafi
17:00	Mwiinde 17'	Report	Danilo 48'; Henrique 84'	Stadium: Masafi Stadium

14 October 2023	Masfout	1–3	Al Dhaid	Masfout
17:05	Gassama 14'	Report	Pouriya 18'; Gabriel 71'; Walker 90+7'	Stadium: Masfout Club Stadium

14 October 2023	Al Dhafra	2–3 (a.e.t.)	Al Urooba	Madinat Zayed
17:10	Jassim 48'; Djehi 120'	Report	Yousuf 29'; Tamboura 94'; Fernández 116'	Stadium: Al Dhafra Stadium

15 October 2023	Dibba Al Hisn	3–0	Al Rams	Dibba Al-Hisn
17:00	Bilal 53'; Dembélé 79'; Caíque 90'	Report		Stadium: Dibba Stadium

15 October 2023	Al Hamriyah	1–2	Al Khaleej	Al Hamriyah
17:05	Rosa 55'	Report	Abdullah 24'; Adeyinka 94'	Stadium: Al Hamriyah Stadium

15 October 2023	Al Arabi	3–0	Al Taawon	Umm Al Quwain
17:05	Vieira 22', 57'; Saudade 90+6'	Report		Stadium: Umm al Quwain Stadium

15 October 2023	Dubai United	2–2 (3–4 p)	Dubai City	Al Hebiah, Dubai
17:05	Imade 71'; Malalla 82'	Report	Moosa 17'; Mendez 90'	Stadium: Dubai Sports City Stadium

=== Quarter-finals ===
11 November 2023	Dibba Al Fujairah	4–0	Al Urooba	Dibba Al Fujairah
16:40	Costa 39', 45'; Moraes 76'; Al-Marbuii 90'	Report		Stadium: New Dibba Stadium

11 November 2023	Al Jazirah Al Hamra	3–0	Al Dhaid	Al Jazirah Al Hamra
16:40	Ghazi 32' (o.g.); Henrique 83'; Fenoglio 90'	Report		Stadium: Al Hamra Stadium

12 November 2023	Dibba Al Hisn	3–1 (a.e.t.)	Dubai City	Dibba Al-Hisn
16:40	Gilmar 99'; Al-Khodaim 108'; Caíque 120'	Report	Gnonsoa 111'	Stadium: Dibba Stadium

12 November 2023	Al Arabi	2–2 (4–2 p)	Al Khaleej	Umm Al Quwain
16:40	Saudade 30'; Mallé 90+2'	Report	Badji 43'; Obande 57'	Stadium: Umm Al Quwain Stadium

=== Final play offs ===
3 December 2023	Dibba Al Hisn	0–1	Al Arabi	Dibba Al-Hisn
16:35		Report	Saudade 16'	Stadium: Dibba Stadium

3 December 2023	Dibba Al Fujairah	1–0	Al Jazirah Al Hamra	Dibba Al Fujairah
16:35	Al-Marbuii 88'	Report		Stadium: New Dibba Stadium

== Knockout stage ==
=== Round of 16 ===
16 February 2024	Al Jazira	1–0	Al Arabi	Al Nahyan, Abu Dhabi
17:25	Fernando 45+1'	Report		Stadium: Mohammed bin Zayed Stadium

16 February 2024	Hatta	0–1	Ajman	Hatta
20:20		Report	Muniz 48'	Stadium: Hamdan bin Rashid Stadium

17 February 2024	Al Wasl	7–1	Emirates	Zabeel, Dubai
17:25	Seferovic 7', 27'; Saleh 18', 40', 67'; Oliveira 81'; Giménez 90'	Report	Saba 29'	Stadium: Zabeel Stadium

17 February 2024	Sharjah	2–1	Al Bataeh	Sharjah
17:25	Saleh 47'; Marega 65'	Report	Al-Zaabi 84'	Stadium: Sharjah Stadium

17 February 2024	Al Nasr	1–0	Khor Fakkan	Al Nasr, Dubai
20:20	Taarabt 90'	Report		Stadium: Al Maktoum Stadium

18 February 2024	Kalba	3–0	Dibba Al Fujairah	Kalba
17:20	Spadacio 40'; Bessa 88', 90+5'	Report		Stadium: Ittihad Kalba Stadium

18 February 2024	Shabab Al Ahli	2–1 (a.e.t.)	Baniyas	Deira, Dubai
17:25	Bala 88'; Jesus 109'	Report	Niakaté 44'	Stadium: Rashid Stadium

18 February 2024	Al Ain	1–0	Al Wahda	Al Ain
20:20	Palacios 86'	Report		Stadium: Hazza bin Zayed Stadium

=== Quarter-finals ===
2 April 2024	Ajman	1–2	Al Nasr	Sharjah
	12'	Report	53' 56'	Stadium: Sharjah Stadium

2 April 2024	Al Jazira	0–3	Al Wasl	Al Ain
		Report	7' 67' 71'	Stadium: Hazza bin Zayed Stadium

3 April 2024	Sharjah	3–4	Shabab Al Ahli	Al Nasr, Dubai
	1' 51' 78'	Report	7' 58' 68' 84'	Stadium: Al Maktoum Stadium

3 April 2024	Kalba	2–1	Al Ain	Zabeel, Dubai
	11' 29' (pen.)	Report	45+3'	Stadium: Zabeel Stadium

=== Semi-finals ===
30 April 2024	Al Wasl	4–1	Kalba	Sharjah
	35' 77' 85' 90+1'	Report	69'	Stadium: Sharjah Stadium

1 May 2024	Al Nasr	4–3 (a.e.t.)	Shabab Al Ahli	Zabeel, Dubai
	12' 90+7' (?)	Report	21' 44' (?)	Stadium: Zabeel Stadium; Referee: Szymon Marciniak (Poland)

=== Final ===
17 May 2024	Al Wasl	4–0	Al Nasr	Al Ain
		Source		Stadium: Hazza bin Zayed Stadium; Referee: Ismail Elfath (USA)

== Top scorers ==
As of 18 February 2024

Rank	Player	Club	Goals
1	(United Arab Emirates) Ali Saleh	Al Wasl	3
1	(Brazil) Júnior Saudade	Al Arabi	3
3	(Brazil) Caíque	Dibba Al Hisn	2
3	(Senegal) Pape Bacary	Dubai United	2
3	(England) Jamal Bartley	Gulf United	2
3	(Brazil) Daniel Bessa	Kalba	2
3	(Brazil) Wanderson Costa	Dibba Al Fujairah	2
3	(Oman) Mohammed Al-Marbuii	Dibba Al Fujairah	2
3	(Brazil) Victor Henrique	Al Jazirah Al Hamra	2
3	(Switzerland) Haris Seferovic	Al Wasl	2
3	(Brazil) Vander Vieira	Al Arabi	2
11	43 players		1
