= 2016–17 UAE President's Cup =

Tournament details
- Country: United Arab Emirates
- Dates: 7 October 2016 – 19 May 2017
- Teams: 16 (Knockout stage); 26 (Total)

Final positions
- Champions: Al Wahda (2nd title)
- Runners-up: Al-Nasr

Tournament statistics
- Matches played: 45
- Goals scored: 136 (3.02 per match)
- Top goal scorer(s): (Mali) Mamadou Coulibaly (United Arab Emirates) Hassan Rashid (Hungary) Balázs Dzsudzsák (5 goals each)
- All statistics correct as of 19 May 2017.

The 2016–17 UAE President's Cup was the 41st edition of the UAE President's Cup. Al-Jazira are the defending champions winning their third title in 2016 after beating Al-Ain 6-5 on penalties after a 1–1 draw.

== Group stage ==
=== Preliminary Group A ===
Team	Pld	W	D	L	GF	GA	GD	Pts
Al Urooba	5	5	0	0	10	2	+8	15
Fujairah	5	3	0	2	9	4	+5	9
Al Hamriyah	5	2	2	1	5	3	+2	8
Al Shaab	5	2	1	2	6	6	0	7
Al Khaleej	5	1	1	3	6	10	−4	4
Al-Arabi	5	0	0	5	4	15	−11	0

=== Preliminary Group B ===
Team	Pld	W	D	L	GF	GA	GD	Pts
Dubai	5	3	1	1	12	6	+6	10
Dibba Al-Hisn	5	2	2	1	10	6	+4	8
Masfout	5	2	1	2	5	10	−5	7
Ajman Club	5	2	1	2	14	6	+8	7
Al Dhaid	5	1	3	1	8	9	−1	6
Ras Al Khaimah	5	1	0	4	5	14	−9	3

7 October 2016 Group stage A	Al Khaleej	1–2	Al Shaab	Khor Fakkan
18:05	Onuoha Ogbonna 61'	Report	Humaid Abdulla 38'; Omar Najdi 43'	Stadium: Saqr bin Mohammad al Qassimi Stadium; Referee: Ali Hasan Al Bloushi

7 October 2016 Group stage A	Al Urooba	1–0	Al Hamriyah	Fujairah
18:05	Kamel Chafni 90+4'	Report		Stadium: Fujairah Club Stadium; Referee: Abdulla Mohamed Eshtairy

7 October 2016 Group stage A	Al Arabi	0–3	Fujairah	Al Hamriyah
18:05		Report	Olanrewaju Kehinde 39', 68'; Mohannad Khameis 45+2'	Stadium: Al Hamriya Sports Club Stadium; Referee: Naser Ali Al Ali

8 October 2016 Group stage B	Ajman Club	8–0	Ras Al Khaimah Club	Ajman
18:05	Saoud Faraj 2', 63', 76'; Rodrigo Silva 9', 23'; Tássio 44'; Al Jamhi 48'; Rashed Malallah 54'	Report		Stadium: Ajman Stadium; Referee: Abdulla Naji Al Harthi

8 October 2016 Group stage B	Al Dhaid	2–2	Dubai	Dhaid
18:05	Nasser Khamis 61', 89'	Report	Vinícius Calamari 51', 75'	Stadium: Al Dhaid Stadium; Referee: Mohammed Salem Al Ali

8 October 2016 Group stage B	Masfout	0–4	Dibba Al Hisn	Dibba Al-Hisn
18:05		Report	Thiago 1'; Hassan Rashid 14', 21'; Al Mehrzi 69'	Stadium: Dibba Al-Hisn Stadium; Referee: Abdalla Rashid Al Naqbi

14 October 2016 Group stage B	Dibba Al Hisn	1–1	Al Dhaid	Dibba Al-Hisn
18:00	Hasan Rashid 39'	Report	Abdulla Essa 16'	Stadium: Dibba Al-Hisn Stadium; Referee: Ahmed Eisa Darwish

14 October 2016 Group stage B	Dubai	3–2	Ajman Club	Dubai
18:00	Hasan Al Jaberi 36'; Walid Khamis 49'; Issam Jemâa 63'	Report	Abdulla Al Jamhi 67'; Rodrigo Silva 90+2'	Stadium: Dubai Club Stadium; Referee: Adel Ali Al Naqbi

14 October 2016 Group stage B	Ras Al Khaimah Club	1–3	Masfout	Ras Al Khaimah
18:00	Alexandre Matão 10'	Report	Cristiano Sergipano 21'; Jassim Mehdi 81'; Ibrahim Abdulla 90+4'	Stadium: Ras al Khaimah Stadium; Referee: Mohammed Ali Al Shabibi

15 October 2016 Group stage A	Fujairah	0–1	Al Urooba	Fujairah
18:00		Report	Robayya Al Mesmari 81'	Stadium: Fujairah Club Stadium; Referee: Fahad Abdulla Al Kassar

15 October 2016 Group stage A	Al Shaab	3–1	Al Arabi	Sharjah
18:05	Alassane Diallo 50', 55'; Omar Najdi 84'	Report	Simon Feindouno 38'	Stadium: Khalid bin Mohammed Stadium; Referee: Salah Aldeen Al Hammadi

15 October 2016 Group stage A	Al Hamriyah	1–1	Al Khaleej	Al Hamriyah
18:05	Igor Carioca 45+2'	Report	Onuoha Ogbonna 57'	Stadium: Al Hamriya Sports Club Stadium; Referee: Ahmed Salem Al Aleeli

21 October 2016 Group stage A	Fujairah	1–0	Al Shaab	Fujairah
17:55	Marcos Pizzelli 84'	Report		Stadium: Fujairah Club Stadium; Referee: Ahmed Salem Al Aleeli

21 October 2016 Group stage A	Al Urooba	1–0	Al Khaleej	Khor Fakkan
17:55	Vinícius Lopes 45+4'	Report		Stadium: Saqr bin Mohammad al Qassimi Stadium; Referee: Yaseen Ahmed Al Mansoori

21 October 2016 Group stage A	Al Arabi	1–0	Al Hamriyah	Al Hamriyah
17:55	Simon Feindouno 90+2'	Report	Jarlisson Pereira 57', 80'; Igor Carioca 70'	Stadium: Al Hamriya Sports Club Stadium; Referee: Naser Ali Al Ali

22 October 2016 Group stage B	Dibba Al Hisn	3–1	Ras Al Khaimah	Dibba Al-Hisn
17:55	Abdalla Mohamed 65'; Hassan Rashid 77', 90+3'	Report	Diakaridia Doumbia 42'	Stadium: Deba Al-Hisn Stadium; Referee: Bader Nasser Bahrooz

22 October 2016 Group stage B	Dhaid	1–3	Ajman Club	Dhaid
17:55	Hamdi Mabrouk 75'	Report	Tássio 52', 82'; Rodrigo Silva 68'	Stadium: Al-Dhaid Stadium; Referee: Abdulla Mohamed Eshtairy

22 October 2016 Group stage B	Masfout	0–4	Dubai	Dubai
17:55		Report	Haruna Garba 3'; Mamadou Coulibaly 6', 48'; Mohamed Al Hosani 52'	Stadium: Dubai Club Stadium; Referee: Abdulla Naji Al Harthi

28 October 2016 Group stage B	Al Dhaid	3–2	Ras Al Khaimah	Dhaid
17:50	Hamdi Mabrouk 11'; Mohamed Hamad 44'; Nasser Khamis 80'	Report	Alexandre Matão 45+2', 50'	Stadium: Al-Dhaid Stadium; Referee: Sultan Mohamed Al Hammadi

28 October 2016 Group stage B	Dubai	3–1	Dibba Al Hisn	Dubai
17:55	Mamadou Coulibaly 18', 74', 86'	Report	Mohamed Rashid 62'	Stadium: Dubai Club Stadium; Referee: Khalid Abdulla Bu Hasan

28 October 2016 Group stage B	Ajman Club	0–1	Masfout	Ajman
17:55		Report	Abdulla Lanjawi 43'	Stadium: Ajman Stadium; Referee: Abdalla Rashid Al Naqbi

29 October 2016 Group stage A	Al Khaleej	2–1	Al Arabi	Khor Fakkan
17:50	Johar Banihammad 79'; Muath Mousa 85'	Report	Omar Wade 13'	Stadium: Saqr bin Mohammad al Qassimi Stadium; Referee: Zayed Dhaif Allah Al Awlaqi

29 October 2016 Group stage A	Al Urooba	3–1	Al Shaab	Fujairah
17:50	Vinícius Lopes 29', 73'; Kamel Chafni 54'	Report	Alassane Diallo 11'	Stadium: Fujairah Club Stadium; Referee: Easa Khalifa Al Hajeri

29 October 2016 Group stage A	Al Hamriyah	1–0	Fujairah	Al Hamriyah
17:50	Yousef Al Mahri 50'	Report		Stadium: Al Hamriya Sports Club Stadium; Referee: Mohammed Salem Al Ali

4 November 2016 Group stage A	Al Shaab	0–0	Al Hamriyah	Sharjah
17:45		Report		Stadium: Khalid bin Mohammed Stadium; Referee: Adel Ali Al Naqbi

4 November 2016 Group stage A	Fujairah	5–2	Al Khaleej	Fujairah
17:45	Mohammed Al Mesmari 20'; Mohannad Khameis 39'; Hassan Maatouk 49', 51', 71'	Report	Ahmed Salim 62'; Chaker Zouaghi 80'	Stadium: Fujairah Club Stadium; Referee: Abdulla Naji Al Harthi

4 November 2016 Group stage A	Al Arabi	1–4	Al Urooba	Al Hamriyah
17:45	Salem Khamis 46'	Report	Ahmed Jumaa 28'; Papa Waigo 65'; Kamel Chafni 72', 86'	Stadium: Al Hamriya Sports Club Stadium; Referee: Mohammed Ali Al Shabibi

5 November 2016 Group stage B	Dibba Al Hisn	1–1	Ajman Club	Dibba Al-Hisn
17:45	Thiago 87'	Report	Rashed Malallah 13'	Stadium: Dibba Al-Hisn Stadium; Referee: Sultan Mohamed Al Hammadi

5 November 2016 Group stage B	Ras Al Khaimah	1–0	Dubai	Ras Al Khaimah
17:50	Ahmed Mohamed 48'	Report		Stadium: Ras al Khaimah Stadium; Referee: Fahad Abdulla Al Kassar

5 November 2016 Group stage B	Masfout Club	1–1	Dhaid	Dhaid
17:50	Cristiano Sergipano 47'	Report	Ali Hassan 39'	Stadium: Al Dhaid Stadium; Referee: Yaseen Ahmed Al Mansoori

== Knockout stage ==
=== Round of 16 ===
26 December 2016
17:50

Al Ittihad Kalba	0–2	Al Jazira
	Report	Ahmed Al Hashmi 60'; Ali Mabkhout 84'

Maktoum bin Rashid Al Maktoum Stadium, Dubai
Referee: Adel Ali Al Naqbi
26 December 2016
17:55

Al Wasl	1–0	Baniyas
Fábio Lima 50', 85'	Report

Sheikh Khalifa International Stadium, Al Ain
Referee: Mohammed Abdulla Hassan
26 December 2016
20:55

Al Ahli	1–3 (a.e.t.)	Al Ain
Ahmed Khalil 57'	Report	Omar Abdulrahman 79', 120+1'; Ibrahim Diaky 97'

Mohammed bin Zayed Stadium, Abu Dhabi
Referee: Ammar Ali Al Junaibi
26 December 2016
20:55

Al Dhafra	1–1 (a.e.t.)	Hatta
Omar Kharbin 25'	Report	Samuel 21'
Penalties
	3–5

Zabeel Stadium, Dubai
Referee: Ammar Ali Al Junaibi

27 December 2016
17:45

Al Urooba	2–3	Sharjah
Vinícius Lopes 54'; Papa Waigo 78'	Report	Digão 10'; Yousif Saeed 33'; Saif Rashid 71'

Ittihad Kalba Club Stadium, Kalba
Referee: Sultan Mohamed Al Hammadi
27 December 2016
17:50

Al Nasr	1–0	Dubai
Wanderley 78'	Report

Rashid Stadium, Dubai
Referee: Yaqoub Yousuf Qasem
27 December 2016
20:50

Al Wahda	3–1 (a.e.t.)	Dibba Al-Fujairah Club
Sultan Al Ghaferi 71'; Hamdan Al Kamali 95'; Ismail Matar 110'	Report	Driss Fettouhi 55'

Al Maktoum Stadium, Dubai
Referee: Hamad Ali Al Ali
27 December 2016
20:50

Al Shabab Al Arabi	0–2	Emirates Club
	Report	Mourad Batna 8'; Sebastián Sáez 77'

Dubai Club Stadium, Dubai
Referee: Ahmed Eisa Darwish

=== Quarter-finals ===
4 January 2017
19:25

Al Wahda	6–0	Al Jazira
Sebastián Tagliabúe 23', 25', 81'; Balázs Dzsudzsák 27', 54'; Mohamed Barghash 72'	Report

Zabeel Stadium, Dubai
Referee: Mohammed Abdulla Hassan
4 January 2017
19:25

Al Wasl	2–4	Sharjah
Ronaldo Mendes 82'; Hassan Mohamed 90+4'	Report	Gelmin Rivas 7', 57', 78'; Omar Juma Al Shuwaihi 37'

Maktoum bin Rashid Al Maktoum Stadium, Dubai
Referee: Yaqoub Yousuf Qasem

5 January 2017
17:55

Emirates Club	1–2	Hatta
Mourad Batna 18'	Report	Samuel 27'; Mahir Jasem 32'

Al Maktoum Stadium, Dubai
Referee: Ahmed Salem Al Aleeli
4 January 2017
21:00

Al Ain	0–1	Al Nasr
	Report	Jassim Yaqoob 25'

Mohammed bin Zayed Stadium, Abu Dhabi
Referee: Omar Mohamed Al Ali

== Semi-finals ==
19 April 2017
20:25

Sharjah	0–1	Al Wahda
	Report	Balázs Dzsudzsák 90+2'

Al Maktoum Stadium, Dubai
Referee: Mohammed Abdulla Hassan

20 April 2017
20:25

Al Nasr	1–0	Hatta
Abdelaziz Barrada 70'	Report

Rashid Stadium, Dubai
Referee: Ammar Ali Al Junaibi

=== Finals ===
19 May 2017
20:25

Al Nasr	0–3	Al Wahda
	Report	Balázs Dzsudzsák 67', 82'; Tareq Ahmed 80'

Zayed Sports City Stadium, Abu Dhabi
Referee: Yaqoub Yousuf Qasem

== Bracket ==
As per UAE Football Association matches database:

Round of 16
Al-Wahda	3
Dibba Al-Fujairah	1
Kalba	0
Al-Jazira	2
Al-Wasl	2
Baniyas	0
Al-Urooba	2
Sharjah	3
Al-Nasr	1
Dubai	0
Al-Ahli	1
Al-Ain	3
Emirates	2
Al-Shabab	0
Al-Dhafra	1
Hatta	2

Quarter-finals
Al-Wahda	6
Al-Jazira	0
Al-Wasl	2
Sharjah	4
Al-Nasr	1
Al-Ain	0
Emirates	1
Hatta	2

Semi-finals
Al-Wahda	1
Sharjah	0
Al-Nasr	1
Hatta	0

Final
Al-Wahda	3
Al-Nasr	0

== Statistics ==
=== Top goalscorers ===
Rank	Player	Team	Goals
1	(Mali) Mamadou Coulibaly	Dubai	5
1	(United Arab Emirates) Hassan Rashid	Dibba Al Hisn	5
1	(Hungary) Balázs Dzsudzsák	Al Wahda	5
4	(Brazil) Vinícius Lopes	Al Urooba	4
4	(Timor-Leste) Rodrigo	Ajman Club	4
4	(Morocco) Kamel Chafni	Al Urooba	4
7	(United Arab Emirates) Saoud Faraj Marzouq	Ajman Club	3
7	(Lebanon) Hassan Maatouk	Fujairah	3
7	(Brazil) Tássio	Ajman Club	3
7	(Brazil) Alexandre Matão	Ras Al Khaimah	3
