= 2017–18 UAE Division 1 =

UAE Division One
- Season: 2017–18
- Champions: Baniyas (4th title)
- Promoted: Baniyas, Kalba
- Matches: 228
- Goals: 401 (1.76 per match)
- Biggest home win: Dibba Al-Hisn 6–0 Ras Al Khaimah (27 April 2018)
- Biggest away win: Masafi 0–5 Baniyas (27 January 2018); Ras Al Khaimah 0–5 Al Khaleej (24 March 2018)
- Highest scoring: Kalba 6–3 Al Hamriyah (7 April 2018)
- Longest winning run: Baniyas; Kalba (5 games)
- Longest unbeaten run: Fujairah (22 games)
- Longest winless run: Al Arabi (19 games)
- Longest losing run: Ras Al Khaimah (8 games)
- Highest attendance: 5,009 Fujairah 1–1 Baniyas (17 November 2017)
- Lowest attendance: 44 Al Arabi 0–1 Al Thaid (6 January 2018)

2017–18 UAE Division 1 was the 42nd season of the UAE 1st Division.

== Team changes ==
=== To Division 1 ===
Relegated from UAE Pro League

- Baniyas
- Kalba

=== From Division 1 ===
Promoted to UAE Pro League

- Ajman
- Dubai

== Stadia and locations ==
Locations of teams in the UAE Division One

Note: Table lists clubs in alphabetical order.

Club	Home city	Stadium	Capacity
Al Arabi	Umm al Quwain	Umm al Quwain Stadium	3,000
Al Hamriyah	Al Hamriyah	Al Hamriya Sports Club Stadium	5,000
Al Khaleej	Khor Fakkan	Saqr bin Mohammad al Qassimi Stadium	2,880
Masafi	Masafi	Masafi Stadium	2,000
Al Thaid	Dhaid	Al-Dhaid Stadium	500
Al Urooba	Mirbah	Al-Oruba Club Stadium	8,000
Baniyas	Abu Dhabi	Baniyas Stadium	9,570
Dibba Al-Hisn	Dibba Al-Hisn	Dibba Stadium	700
Fujairah	Fujairah	Fujairah Club Stadium	10,645
Kalba	Kalba	Ittihad Kalba Stadium	8,500
Masfut	Masfut	Masfut Club Stadium	3,000
Ras Al Khaimah	Ras Al Khaimah	Ras al Khaimah Stadium	4,500

=== Number of teams by Emirates ===
Rank	Emirate	Number of teams	Teams
1	(Emirate of Sharjah) Sharjah	5	Al Hamriyah, Al Khaleej, Al Dhaid, Dibba Al Hisn, Kalba
2	(Emirate of Fujairah) Fujairah	2	Al Urooba, Fujairah
2	(Emirate of Ras Al Khaimah) Ras al-Khaimah	2	Masafi, Ras Al Khaimah
3	(Emirate of Umm Al Quwain) Umm al-Quwain	1	Al Arabi
3	(Emirate of Abu Dhabi) Abu Dhabi	1	Baniyas
3	(Emirate of Ajman) Ajman	1	Masfut

== Personnel and kits ==
Note: Flags indicate national team as has been defined under FIFA eligibility rules. Players may hold more than one non-FIFA nationality.

Team	Head coach	Captain	Kit manufacturer	Shirt sponsor
Al Arabi	(Iraq) Jamal Ali	(United Arab Emirates) Omar Wade	Nike	Al Futaim
Al Khaleej	(United Arab Emirates) Badr Al Hammadi	(United Arab Emirates) Ibrahim Almansoori	Adidas	Khor Fakkan Beach Resort
Al-Hamriyah	(United Arab Emirates) Sulaiman Al Blooshi		Nike	Sharjah Beach Resort
Al Dhaid	(United Arab Emirates) Mohamed Al Tunaiji	(United Arab Emirates) Salem Musabbeh	uhlsport	uhlsport
Al-Urooba	(Bosnia and Herzegovina) Rodion Gačanin	(United Arab Emirates) Faisal Mohammed	uhlsport	Fujairah TV
Baniyas	(Serbia) Goran Tufegdzic	(United Arab Emirates) Yousif Jaber	Adidas	Secure Engineering
Dibba Al-Hisn	(Italy) Guglielmo Arena	(United Arab Emirates) Humaid Abbas	uhlsport	Chips Oman
Fujairah	(Argentina) Diego Maradona	(United Arab Emirates) Ahmed Meadhad	Adidas	Al Khaleej Times
Kalba	(Brazil) Jorvan Vieira		Errea	Errea
Masafi	(Morocco) Brahim Boufoud	(United Arab Emirates) Mohammed Ahli	Adidas	Al Futaim
Masfut	(United Arab Emirates) Walid Obaid	(France) Fatrie Sakhi	Nike	Masdar
Ras Al Khaimah	(Brazil) Luiz Antônio Zaluar	(United Arab Emirates) Omar Abdulaziz	Nike	Al Aswaq

== Foreign players ==
Club	Player 1	Player 2	Former Players
Al-Arabi	(Ivory Coast) Brahima Diakité	(Ivory Coast) Cedric Fein	(Brazil) Rafael Porcellis
Al-Dhaid	(Morocco) Bouchaib Soufiani	(Senegal) Papa Waigo	(Brazil) Ademir
Al-Hamriyah	(Brazil) Marcus Vinícius	(Morocco) Kamel Chafni	(Brazil) Igor Carneiro
Al-Khaleej	(Jordan) Munther Abu Amarah	(Tunisia) Mohamed Ali Ben Hammouda	–
Al-Urooba	(Brazil) Ricardo Jesus	(Cameroon) Henri Bienvenu	(Nigeria) Marshal Johnson
Baniyas	(Ivory Coast) Manucho	(Nigeria) Osarimen Ebagua	(France) Jean-Philippe Mendy (Martinique) Harry Novillo
Dibba Al-Hisn	(Brazil) Alexandre Matão	(Tunisia) Chadi Hammami	–
Fujairah	(Argentina) Danilo Carando	(France) Omar Kossoko	(Argentina) Gonzalo Bravo
Kalba	(Brazil) Gustavo Marmentini	(Morocco) Omar Mansouri	(Brazil) Thiago Santos
Masafi	(Burkina Faso) Ali Rabo	(Senegal) Yally Fall Guène	–
Masfout	(France) Fatrei Sakhi	(Zimbabwe) Noel Kaseke	–
Ras Al-Khaimah	(Brazil) Fidélis	(Egypt) Moataz Eno	(Brazil) Alex Rafael

== League table ==
Pos	Team	Pld	W	D	L	GF	GA	GD	Pts	Promotion or qualification
1	Baniyas (C, P)	22	16	4	2	53	16	+37	52	Promotion to the UAE Pro-League
2	Kalba (P)	22	13	7	2	44	22	+22	46	Promotion to the UAE Pro-League
3	Fujairah (Q)	22	11	11	0	37	21	+16	44	Qualified for the UAE Pro-League Play Off
4	Al Hamriyah (Q)	22	9	6	7	43	40	+3	33	Qualified for the UAE Pro-League Play Off
5	Al Khaleej	22	7	9	6	36	30	+6	30	
6	Al Urooba	22	7	7	8	26	28	−2	28	
7	Al Dhaid	22	6	8	8	30	28	+2	26	
8	Dibba Al-Hisn	22	7	4	11	36	37	−1	25	
9	Masafi	22	5	10	7	36	41	−5	25	
10	Masfut	22	5	5	12	23	42	−19	20	
11	Al Arabi	22	2	8	12	20	40	−20	14	
12	Ras Al Khaimah (W)	22	3	3	16	18	57	−39	12	Withdrew

Updated to match(es) played on 2018. Source: soccerway.com
Rules for classification: 1) points; 2) goal difference; 3) number of goals scored.
(C) Champions; (P) Promoted; (Q) Qualified for the phase indicated; (W) Withdrew

== Results ==
Home \ Away	ARB	DHD	HAM	KHL	URO	YAS	DAH	FUJ	KAL	MSF	MST	RAK
Al Arabi		0–1	0–2	1–1	3–3	1–5	1–1	0–2	1–1	2–4	3–1	0–0
Al Dhaid	0–2		1–0	1–1	3–1	0–1	0–1	2–2	1–2	2–2	1–2	0–0
Al Hamriyah	3–2	2–1		2–3	2–3	2–1	3–2	2–3	1–1	1–1	5–1	3–1
Al Khaleej	1–1	0–0	3–0		0–0	2–4	3–3	0–2	1–4	1–0	3–0	4–1
Al Urooba	3–0	2–2	0–0	3–1		0–2	1–0	0–1	1–3	1–1	2–1	0–1
Baniyas	3–0	2–1	1–2	1–0	3–1		3–0	1–1	1–1	5–0	2–0	4–0
Dibba Al Hisn	3–0	0–1	2–3	3–4	1–0	0–1		0–2	2–2	3–1	3–1	6–0
Fujairah	0–0	3–3	2–1	1–1	1–1	1–1	2–2		1–0	1–1	2–2	2–0
Kalba	1–0	3–2	6–3	1–1	2–0	1–1	3–0	1–2		2–1	4–0	1–0
Masafi	2–2	2–4	2–2	0–0	1–1	0–5	2–0	0–1	3–3		4–2	6–1
Masfut	1–0	0–0	1–1	2–1	0–1	1–2	3–2	1–1	0–1	1–1		3–2
Ras Al Khaimah	2–1	0–4	3–3	0–5	0–2	2–4	1–2	2–4	0–1	1–2	1–0	

Updated to match(es) played on Completed. Source: GSA
Legend: Blue = home team win; Yellow = draw; Red = away team win.
