= 2016–17 UAE Division 1 =

Winners of the 2016/17 UAE Division 1

UAE Division One
- Season: 2016–17
- Champions: Ajman (2nd title)
- Promoted: Ajman, Dubai
- Matches: 264
- Goals: 369 (1.4 per match)
- Biggest home win: Al Urooba 6–1 Al Arabi (25 February 2017)
- Biggest away win: Arabi 0–10 Al Urooba (18 November 2016)
- Longest winning run: Dubai 6 games
- Longest unbeaten run: Ajman 20 games
- Longest winless run: Masfut and Al Dhaid 6 games
- Longest losing run: Ras Al Khaimah 4 games
- Highest attendance: 6,397; Fujairah 2–1 Al-Urooba (3 March 2017)
- Lowest attendance: 56; Al-Arabi 1–2 Al–Hamriyah (4 February 2017)
- Average attendance: 2,100

Ajman Club were the champions of the 2016–17 UAE Division 1.

As of 2016–17 the league features 12 sides who play each once for a total of 11 games each. The top two sides gain promotion to the Pro-League, there is no longer relegation as the UAE Division One Group B League stopped playing in 2012.

== Stadia and locations ==
Locations of teams in the UAE Division One

Note: Table lists clubs in alphabetical order.

Club	Home city	Stadium	Capacity
Al Arabi	Umm al Quwain	Umm al Quwain Stadium	250
Al Hamriyah	Al Hamriyah	Al Hamriya Sports Club Stadium	5,000
Al Khaleej	Khor Fakkan	Saqr bin Mohammad al Qassimi Stadium	2,880
Al Shaab	Sharjah	Khalid Bin Mohammed Stadium	10,000
Al Thaid	Dhaid	Al-Dhaid Stadium	500
Al Urooba	Mirbah	Al-Oruba Club Stadium	8,000
Ajman	Ajman	Ajman Stadium	5,537
Dibba Al-Hisn	Dibba Al-Hisn	Dibba Stadium	10,000
Dubai	Dubai	Dubai Club Stadium	7,500
Fujairah	Fujairah	Fujairah Club Stadium	10,645
Masfut	Masfut	Masfut Club Stadium	3,000
Ras Al Khaimah	Ras Al Khaimah	Ras al Khaimah Stadium	3,000

== Personnel and kits ==
Note: Flags indicate national team as has been defined under FIFA eligibility rules. Players may hold more than one non-FIFA nationality.

Team	Head Coach	Captain	Kit Manufacturer
Ajman	(Egypt) Ayman El Ramady	(United Arab Emirates) Jasim Ali Mohammed	uhlsport
Al Hamriyah	(United Arab Emirates) Mohamed Ismail	(United Arab Emirates) Talal Mubarak	uhlsport
Al Khaleej	(Tunisia) Mohamed El Mansi	(Tunisia) Chaker Zouaghi	uhlsport
Al Shaab	(Brazil) Péricles Chamusca	(United Arab Emirates) Saif Mohamed	uhlsport
Al Thaid	(United Arab Emirates) Walid Obaid	(United Arab Emirates) Salem Musabbeh	uhlsport
Al Urooba	(United Arab Emirates) Badir Al Hammadi	(United Arab Emirates) Mohamed Al Yammahi	uhlsport
Dibba Al Hisn	(Portugal) Rui Nascimento	(United Arab Emirates) Ahmed Al Hefeiti	uhlsport
Dubai	(Egypt) Hany Ramzy	(United Arab Emirates) Jamal Abdulla	uhlsport
Fujairah	(Bosnia and Herzegovina) Džemal Hadžiabdić	(United Arab Emirates) Mubarak Hassan	uhlsport
Masfut	(United Arab Emirates) Sulaiman Al Blooshi	(Zimbabwe) Noel Kaseke	uhlsport
Ras Al Khaimah	(Brazil) Luiz Antônio Zaluar	(Brazil) Alexandre Matão	uhlsport

== League table ==
Pos	Team	Pld	W	D	L	GF	GA	GD	Pts	Promotion
1	Ajman (C, P)	22	12	9	1	40	23	+17	45	Promotion to the UAE Pro-League
2	Dubai (P)	22	13	4	5	37	22	+15	43	Promotion to the UAE Pro-League
3	Al Urooba	22	11	4	7	50	27	+23	37	
4	Fujairah	22	10	4	8	38	30	+8	34	
5	Dibba Al Hisn	22	8	9	5	27	26	+1	33	
6	Al Shaab	22	6	10	6	41	38	+3	28	
7	Al Khaleej	22	7	6	9	29	35	−6	27	
8	Masfut	22	7	4	11	37	47	−10	25	
9	Al Dhaid	22	6	6	10	20	28	−8	24	
10	Al Hamriyah	22	6	5	11	25	30	−5	23	
11	Al Arabi	22	7	2	13	31	52	−21	23	
12	Ras Al Khaimah	22	5	5	12	29	46	−17	20	

Updated to match(es) played on 22 April 2017. Source: soccerway
Rules for classification: 1) points; 2) goal difference; 3) number of goals scored.
(C) Champions; (P) Promoted

== Results ==
Home \ Away	AJM	ARB	DHD	HAM	KHL	SHB	URO	DAH	DUB	FUJ	MST	RAK
Ajman		2–1	1–1	2–2	2–0	1–0	3–1	0–0	0–2	2–2	4–2	2–1
Al Arabi	0–3		2–1	1–2	0–2	4–2	0–10	2–3	2–3	4–2	1–3	4–0
Al Dhaid	1–3	0–0		1–0	0–0	1–1	1–1	0–1	1–1	1–0	2–1	2–1
Al Hamriyah	1–2	2–1	3–0		3–1	0–2	2–0	0–1	1–1	0–3	1–2	0–1
Al Khaleej	1–1	0–1	1–5	3–2		3–2	1–2	2–2	1–0	1–3	4–0	2–1
Al Shaab	3–3	4–3	1–0	1–1	2–1		1–1	2–2	1–2	3–0	2–3	3–1
Al Urooba	1–1	6–1	2–0	2–1	2–0	3–3		3–1	1–3	2–4	0–1	3–1
Dibba Al Hisn	0–0	2–0	2–1	0–0	1–2	0–0	0–4		0–1	1–0	1–0	3–1
Dubai	0–2	0–1	3–0	2–0	2–0	2–1	1–0	2–2		2–3	4–0	2–0
Fujairah	2–3	0–1	1–0	0–1	0–0	1–1	2–1	2–2	3–0		3–0	2–0
Masfut	1–2	4–1	3–0	1–1	2–2	2–2	0–2	3–2	2–2	3–4		1–3
Ras Al Khaimah	1–1	1–1	0–2	3–2	2–2	4–4	0–3	1–1	1–2	2–1	4–3	

Updated to match(es) played on Completed. Source: soccerway
Legend: Blue = home team win; Yellow = draw; Red = away team win.
