= 2016–17 Bahrain First Division League =

Bahrain First Division League
- Season: 2016–17
- Champions: Malkiya (1st title)
- Relegated: Bahrain SC; Al Hala
- AFC Champions League: Malkiya
- AFC Cup: Manama

The 2016–17 Bahraini First Division League was the 60th top-level football season in Bahrain. Ten teams participated with Al-Hidd as the defending champions after securing the championship last season for the first time.

Malkiya won the title for the first time.

== Foreign players ==
Club	Player 1	Player 2	Player 3	Player 4	Player 5	AFC Player	Former Players
Al-Ahli	(Bosnia and Herzegovina) Mehmed Alispahić	(Brazil) Cleiton Mineiro	(Ivory Coast) Mohamed Lamine	(Netherlands) Sidney Schmeltz	(Togo) Komi-Fovi Aguidi		
Al-Hala	(Brazil) Diego Silva						(Brazil) Alexandre Matão (Kyrgyzstan) Daniel Tagoe
Al-Hidd	(Ghana) Moussa Narry	(Nigeria) Ifedayo Olusegun	(Nigeria) Orok Akarandut	(Nigeria) Uche Agba	(Slovenia) Ales Petrovacki	(Jordan) Mohammad Al-Dawud	
Al-Muharraq	(Brazil) Felipinho	(Democratic Republic of the Congo) Doris Fuakumputu	(Netherlands) Gregory Nelson	(Syria) Ahmad Deeb		(Yemen) Ahmed Al-Khamri	(Brazil) Vítor Saba (Syria) Mahmoud Al-Mawas
Al-Najma	(Brazil) Aílton	(Brazil) Edílson	(Ghana) Evans Frimpong	(Mexico) Édgar Pacheco			
Al-Riffa	(Brazil) Danilo Bueno	(Colombia) Víctor Montaño	(Ivory Coast) Abdoulaye Coulibaly	(Nigeria) Onuoha Ogbonna	(Tunisia) Oussema Boughanmi	(Kyrgyzstan) Azamat Baymatov	
Bahrain Club	(Argentina) Cristian Toncheff	(Brazil) Bruno Araújo	(Brazil) Vítor Huvos			(Syria) Hadi Al Masri	
East Riffa	(Brazil) João Luiz	(Serbia) Mladen Jovancic	(Tunisia) Khaled Hmani			(Yemen) Mudir Al-Radaei	
Malkiya	(Nigeria) Gege Soriola	(Syria) Israa Hamwiah				(Yemen) Nawaf Abdullah	
Manama	(Brazil) Everton	(Brazil) Lázaro	(Brazil) Thiago Augusto			(South Korea) Lee Won-jae	

== League table ==
Pos	Team	Pld	W	D	L	GF	GA	GD	Pts	Qualification or relegation
1	Malkiya (C)	18	9	6	3	24	16	+8	33	Qualification to the 2018 AFC Champions League preliminary round 1
2	Al-Riffa	18	9	4	5	32	16	+16	31	
3	Al Hidd	18	9	4	5	27	23	+4	31	
4	Manama Club	18	9	3	6	29	19	+10	30	Qualification to the 2018 AFC Cup group stage (Note: Manama Club qualified for 2018 AFC Cup Group Stage as winners of 2016–17 Bahraini King's Cup.)
5	Al-Muharraq	18	8	5	5	30	23	+7	29	
6	East Riffa	18	6	4	8	23	25	−2	22	
7	Al-Ahli	18	5	5	8	16	24	−8	20	
8	Al-Najma SC	18	3	8	7	20	32	−12	17	
9	Bahrain (R)	18	3	7	8	18	27	−9	16	Relegation to the 2017–18 Bahraini Second Division
10	Al Hala (R)	18	2	8	8	11	25	−14	14	Relegation to the 2017–18 Bahraini Second Division

Rules for classification: 1) points; 2) goal difference; 3) number of goals scored.
(C) Champions; (R) Relegated
