= Waleed Jumaa =

Emirati footballer (born 1993)

Personal information
- Full name: Waleed Jumaa Mohammed
- Date of birth: 15 August 1993 (age 33)
- Place of birth: United Arab Emirates
- Height: 1.79 m (5 ft 10 1/2 in)
- Position: Defender

Youth career
- Ittihad Kalba

Senior career*
Years	Team	Apps	(Gls)
2014–2018	Ittihad Kalba		
2018–2019	Emirates Club		
2019	Dibba Al-Hisn		
2019–2020	Masfout		
2020–2021	Al Dhaid		
- * Club domestic league appearances and goals

Waleed Jumaa (Arabic:وليد جمعة) (born 15 August 1993) is an Emirati footballer. He currently plays as a defender.
