= 2015–16 UAE Division 1 =

UAE Division One
- Season: 2015–16
- Champions: Hatta (1st title)
- Promoted: Hatta, Kalba
- Matches played: 144
- Goals scored: 260 (1.81 per match)
- Top goalscorer: Tássio Santos (17 goals)
- Biggest home win: Kalba 5–0 Hatta (5 March 2016); Ajman 5–0 Al Khaleej (8 January 2016); Ajman 6–1 Ras Al Khaimah (22 January 2016)
- Biggest away win: Ras Al Khaimah 0–4 Kalba (13 February 2016)
- Longest winning run: Hatta 5 games
- Longest unbeaten run: Hatta 10 games
- Longest winless run: Ras Al Khaimah 9 games
- Longest losing run: Ras Al Khaimah 8 games
- Highest attendance: Hatta 2–1 Ajman (4,839)
- Lowest attendance: Al Thaid 3–1 Ras Al Khaimah (25)
- Average attendance: 1,013

The 2015–16 Division 1 was the 40th season of the UAE Division 1. 9 teams took part, each playing each other twice, home and away, for a total of 16 games. Hatta were the inaugural champions.

== Stadia and locations ==
Locations of teams in the UAE Division One

Note: Table lists clubs in alphabetical order.

Club	Home city	Stadium	Capacity
Al Khaleej	Khor Fakkan	Saqr bin Mohammad al Qassimi Stadium	2,880
Al Dhaid	Dhaid	Al-Dhaid Stadium	500
Al Urooba	Mirbah	Al-Oruba Club Stadium	8,000
Ajman	Ajman	Ajman Stadium	5,537
Dibba Al-Hisn	Dibba Al-Hisn	Dibba Stadium	10,000
Hatta	Hatta	Hamdan Bin Rashid Stadium	5,000
Dubai	Dubai	Dubai Club Stadium	7,500
Kalba	Kalba	Ittihad Kalba Stadium	8,500
Ras Al Khaimah	Ras Al Khaimah	Ras al Khaimah Stadium	3,000

== Personnel and kits ==
Note: Flags indicate national team as has been defined under FIFA eligibility rules. Players may hold more than one non-FIFA nationality.

Team	Head Coach	Captain	Kit Manufacturer
Ajman	(Egypt) Ayman El Ramady	(Morocco) Driss Fettouhi	uhlsport
Al Khaleej	(United Arab Emirates) Ismail Khalaf	(United Arab Emirates) Mohammad Ghuloom	uhlsport
Al Dhaid	(United Arab Emirates) Mohamed Al Tunaiji	(United Arab Emirates) Salem Musabbeh	uhlsport
Al Urooba	(Brazil) Marco Aurélio	(Ivory Coast) Boubacar Sanogo	uhlsport
Dubai	(Egypt) Hany Ramzy	(United Arab Emirates) Jamal Abdulla	uhlsport
Dibba Al Hisn	(Brazil) Fábio Magrão	(United Arab Emirates) Adel Abdulkareem	uhlsport
Hatta	(United Arab Emirates) Walid Obaid	(United Arab Emirates) Ali Mahmoud	uhlsport
Kalba	(Tunisia) Mourad Okbi	(Senegal) Papa Waigo	uhlsport
Ras Al Khaimah	(United Arab Emirates) Hasan Ebrahim	(United Arab Emirates) Khaled Esmaeel	uhlsport

== League table ==
Pos	Team	Pld	W	D	L	GF	GA	GD	Pts	Promotion
1	Hatta (C, P)	16	12	3	1	39	21	+18	39	Promotion to the UAE Pro-League
2	Kalba (P)	16	12	1	3	43	17	+26	37	Promotion to the UAE Pro-League
3	Ajman	16	11	2	3	46	19	+27	35	
4	Dubai	16	11	1	4	27	14	+13	34	
5	Al Urooba	16	5	1	10	27	35	−8	16	
6	Dibba Al-Hisn	16	5	0	11	19	28	−9	15	
7	Al Dhaid	16	4	2	10	25	41	−16	14	
8	Al Khaleej	16	4	1	11	16	35	−19	13	
9	Ras Al Khaimah	16	1	3	12	18	50	−32	6	

Updated to match(es) played on 22 April 2016. Source: soccerway
Rules for classification: 1) points; 2) goal difference; 3) number of goals scored.
(C) Champions; (P) Promoted

== Results ==
Home \ Away	AJM	KHL	DHD	URO	DUB	DAH	HAT	KAL	RAK
Ajman		5–0	2–2	5–1	2–1	1–0	2–2	1–2	6–1
Al Khaleej	0–1		2–3	3–0	0–2	1–0	2–3	0–1	0–0
Al Dhaid	3–6	3–2		1–4	2–3	0–1	0–2	1–2	3–1
Al Urooba	0–4	4–1	0–2		0–2	2–5	3–4	1–2	6–2
Dubai	3–2	0–1	2–0	1–0		2–1	1–1	1–0	3–1
Dibba Al Hisn	2–3	3–1	1–0	0–1	0–1		1–2	0–4	3–2
Hatta	2–1	3–0	6–2	1–0	2–1	1–0		4–0	1–1
Kalba	0–2	6–1	6–2	1–1	2–1	4–0	5–0		4–2
Ras Al Khaimah	0–3	1–2	1–1	1–4	0–3	3–2	2–5	0–4	

Updated to match(es) played on Completed. Source: soccerway
Legend: Blue = home team win; Yellow = draw; Red = away team win.
