= Abdullah Al Mulla =

Emirati association football player (born 1995)

Abdullah Al Mulla عبد الله الملا
Personal information
- Full name: Abdullah Abdulrazaq Mohammed Al Mulla
- Date of birth: 25 March 1995 (age 31)
- Place of birth: Emirates
- Height: 1.76 m (5 ft 9 in)
- Position: Midfielder

Youth career
- 2006–2014: Dubai

Senior career*
Years	Team	Apps	(Gls)
2017–2018	Hatta		
2018	Masfout		
2019	Al Dhaid		
2019–2020	Dibba Al-Hisn		
2021–2024	Gulf		
- * Club domestic league appearances and goals

Abdullah Al Mulla (Arabic:عبد الله الملا, born 25 March 1995) is an Emirati footballer. He currently plays as a midfielder.

== Career ==
Al Mulla started his career at Dubai and is a product of the Dubai's youth system. and after hem played for Hatta, Masfout, Al Dhaid, and Dibba Al-Hisn.
