= List of Egyptian football players in foreign leagues =

This is a list of Egyptian football players who play in foreign leagues.

== List of countries ==
=== Australia ===
Youth Leagues

- Elijah Keamy - Bulleen Lions U18
- George Matta - Manningham United U19
- Nour Shalaby - Northcote City U17
- Jeremiah Morcos - Brunswick Juventus U17

=== England ===
Premier League

- Mohamed Salah – without club
- Omar Marmoush – Man City

EFL Championship

- Sam Morsy – without club

=== France ===
Ligue 1

- Mostafa Mohamed – Nantes
- Mohamed Abdelmonem – Nice

=== Germany ===
Bundesliga

Omar Mageed – Hamburg SV

2. Bundesliga

- Selim Telib – Hertha BSC

Regionalliga West

=== Greece ===
Super League Greece

- Amr Warda – Atromitos
- Bilal Mazhar – Olympiacos B

=== Latvia ===
Latvijas futbola 2. līga

- Ziad Moustafa – Mārupes SC Futbols

=== Netherlands ===
Tweede Divisie

Moustafa Ashraf - Vitesse Arnhem Adam Zaian - Maastricht

=== Norway ===
4. divisjon

- Sabri Khattab – Tistedalens

=== Poland ===
II liga

- Abdallah Hafez – Górnik Polkowice

=== Portugal ===
Liga Portugal 2

- Ahmed Elganainy – Leixões S.C.
- Hamza Alaa – Portimonense

=== Qatar ===
Qatar Stars League

- Ahmed Aboutrika – Al-Arabi
- Louay Ashoor – Al-Markhiya
- Yousef Ramadan – Al-Markhiya
- Saif Aboutrika – Qatar

=== Romania ===
Liga II

- Omar El Sawy – Csíkszereda Miercurea Ciuc

=== Saudi Arabia ===
Saudi Professional League

- Ahmed Hegazi – Neom SC
- Tarek Hamed – Damac FC
- Noureddine El Bahhar – Al-Ittihad

=== Scotland ===
Scottish League One

- Ramez Hefzalla – Peterhead

=== Spain ===
LaLiga

- Haissem Hassan - Real Oviedo CF
- Ziad Fathy - Celta Vigo

=== Sweden ===
Superettan

- Ahmed Bonnah – Östers

=== Turkey ===
Süper Lig

- Omar Fayed (footballer) – Fenerbahçe

=== United Arab Emirates ===
UAE Pro-League

- Abdalla Al Refaey – Khor Fakkan
- Mohamed Elneny – Al Jazira
- Ramy Rabia – Al Ain

=== United States of America ===
NCAA D1

- Yusuf Shafei – Longwood
- Youssef Montasser- Rutgers

== Egyptian players won titles in European clubs ==
Bold: Still playing competitive football in Europe

#	Name	League	Cup	Others	Europe	Worldwide	TOTAL
1	**Mohamed Salah**	(Switzerland) 2013, 2014, (England) 2020, 2025	(England) 2022, 2022	(England) 2022	(Europe) 2019, 2019	2019	10
2	**Mohamed Elneny**	(Switzerland) 2013, 2014, 2015, 2016	(England) 2017	(England) 2017, 2020			7
3	Ahmed Hassan	(Belgium) 2007	(Turkey) 2006, (Belgium) 2008	(Belgium) 2006, 2007			5
4	Mido	(Netherlands) 2002, 2011	(Netherlands) 2002	(Netherlands) 2002			4
5	**Koka**	(Greece) 2020, 2021	(Portugal) 2016, (Greece) 2020				4
6	**Amr Warda**		(Greece) 2017, 2021				2
7	Mohamed Zidan	(Germany) 2011, 2012	(Germany) 2006				3
8	**Sam Morsy**	(England) 2014, 2016, 2018					3
9	Omar Gaber	(Switzerland) 2017	(Switzerland) 2017				2
10	Hany Ramzy			(Germany) 1994			1
11	Ahmed Salah Hosny				(Europe) 2000		1
12	Ayman Abdelaziz		(Turkey) 2002				1
13	Essam El Hadary		(Switzerland) 2009				1
14	Ahmed Hamoudi	(Switzerland) 2015					1
15	**Omar Marmoush**	(Germany) 2019					1
16	**Alexander Jakobsen**	(Georgia (country)) 2023					1
17	Trézéguet			(Turkey) 2022			1

== See also ==
- Egyptian Football Association
- Egyptian Premier League
- Egypt Cup
- EFA League Cup
- Egyptian Super Cup
- Egypt national football team
- Egypt national under-23 football team
- Egypt national under-20 football team
- Egypt national under-17 football team
- List of football clubs in Egypt
