= Abdullah Morad =

Emirati footballer (born 1990)

Personal information
- Full name: Abdullah Morad Ali
- Date of birth: 8 May 1990 (age 36)
- Place of birth: United Arab Emirates
- Height: 1.73 m (5 ft 8 in)
- Position: Forward

Youth career
- Al Shabab

Senior career*
Years	Team	Apps	(Gls)
2011–2014	Al Shabab		
2014–2017	Hatta		
2017–2018	Ittihad Kalba		
2018–2019	Al-Dhaid		
- * Club domestic league appearances and goals

Abdullah Morad (Arabic:عبد الله مراد) (born 8 May 1990) is an Emirati footballer who plays as a forward, most recently for Al-Dhaid.
