= Yousuf Khalfan =

Emirati association football player (born 1989)

Yousuf Khalfan يوسف خلفان
Personal information
- Full name: Yousuf Khalfan Naser Al-Hassani
- Date of birth: 2 March 1989 (age 37)
- Place of birth: Emirates
- Height: 1.73 m (5 ft 8 in)
- Position: Defender

Youth career
- Al-Fujairah

Senior career*
Years	Team	Apps	(Gls)
2008-2017	Al-Fujairah		
2017–2019	Dibba Al-Fujairah	17	(0)
2020–2022	Al Urooba		
2022-2025	Al-Fujairah		
- * Club domestic league appearances and goals

Yousuf Khalfan (Arabic:يوسف خلفان) (born 2 March 1989) is an Emirati footballer. He currently plays as a defender.

== Career ==
=== Al-Fujairah ===
Yousuf Khalfan started his career at Al-Fujairah and is a product of the Al-Fujairah's youth system. On 28 May 2015, made his professional debut for Al-Fujairah against Al Ain in the Pro League, replacing Humaid Ahmed . landed with Al-Fujairah from the UAE Pro League to the UAE First Division League in 2015-16 season. ended up with Al-Fujairah from the UAE First Division League to the UAE Pro League in the 2017-18 season.

=== Dibba Al-Fujaurah ===
On 26 July 2017, left Al-Fujairah and signed with Dibba Al-Fujairah. On 14 October 2017, made his professional debut for Dibba Al-Fujairah against Al-Nasr in the Pro League, replacing Yaseen al-Bakhit . landed with Dibba Al-Fujairah from the UAE Pro League to the UAE First Division League in 2018-19 season.
