= Nader Ragab =

Emirati association football player (born 1992)

Nader Ragab نادر رجب
Personal information
- Full name: Nader Ragab Ali Mohamed Ragab
- Date of birth: 12 September 1992 (age 34)
- Place of birth: Emirates
- Height: 1.84 m (6 ft 0 in)
- Position: Goalkeeper

Youth career
- 2005–2014: Al-Shabab

Senior career*
Years	Team	Apps	(Gls)
2014–2017	Al-Shabab	2	(0)
2017–2018	Ittihd Kalba		
2018–2019	Al-Hamriyah		
- * Club domestic league appearances and goals

Nader Ragab (Arabic:نادر رجب) (born 12 September 1992) is an Emirati footballer who plays as a goalkeeper.

== Career ==
=== Al-Shabab ===
Nader Ragab started his career at Al-Shabab and is a product of the Al-Shabab's youth system. On 4 March 2017, made his professional debut for Al-Shabab against Dibba Al-Fujairah in the Pro League.

=== Ittihad Kalba ===
On 26 July 2017 left Al-Shabab and signed with Ittihd Kalba.

=== Al Hamriyah ===
On Season 2018, left Ittihd Kalba and signed with Al-Hamriyah.
