= Abdullah Al-Jamhi =

Emirati association footballer (born 1991)

Abdullah Al-Jamhi عبد الله الجمحي
Personal information
- Full name: Abdullah Ali Salem Al-Jamhi
- Date of birth: 1 October 1991 (age 35)
- Place of birth: United Arab Emirates
- Height: 1.70 m (5 ft 7 in)
- Position: Winger

Team information
- Current team: Masfout

Youth career
- Ajman Club

Senior career*
Years	Team	Apps	(Gls)
2011–2012	Ajman Club	4	(0)
2012–2015	Al-Shabab	6	(0)
2013	→ Ittihad Kalba (loan)	11	(3)
2014–2015	Al Wahda	0	(0)
2015–2017	Al-Shaab	10	(0)
2017–2020	Ajman Club	1	(0)
2021–	Masfout	0	(0)
- * Club domestic league appearances and goals

Abdullah Al-Jamhi (Arabic:عبد الله الجمحي) (born 1 October 1991) is an Emirati footballer who plays for Masfout as a winger, most recently for Ajman Club.
