= Khalid Al-Shaibani =

Emirati association football player (born 1997)

Khalid Al-Shaibani خالد الشيباني
Personal information
- Full name: Khalid Hassan Al-Shaibani
- Date of birth: 31 July 1997 (age 29)
- Place of birth: Emirates
- Height: 1.70 m (5 ft 7 in)
- Position: Midfielder

Team information
- Current team: Al Dhaid
- Number: 8

Youth career
- –2017: Al-Wasl

Senior career*
Years	Team	Apps	(Gls)
2017–2020	Al-Wasl	1	(0)
2020–2021	Al Hamriyah		
2021–2024	Al-Arabi		
2024–	Al Dhaid		
- * Club domestic league appearances and goals

Khalid Al-Shaibani (Arabic:خالد الشيباني) (born 31 July 1997) is an Emirati footballer who plays for Al Dhaid as a midfielder, most recently for Al-Wasl.

== Career ==
Al-Shaibani started his career at Al-Wasl and is a product of the Al-Wasl's youth system. On 17 March 2018, Al-Shaibani made his professional debut for Al-Wasl against Al Dhafra in the Pro League, replacing Anthony Caceres .
