= Ibrahim Qanber =

Emirati footballer (born 1990)

Personal information
- Full name: Ibrahim Abdullah Qanber
- Date of birth: 1 April 1990 (age 36)
- Place of birth: United Arab Emirates
- Height: 1.81 m (5 ft 11 1/2 in)
- Position: Midfielder

Youth career
- Al-Shabab

Senior career*
Years	Team	Apps	(Gls)
2010–2017	Al-Shabab		
2013–2014	→ Al-Shaab (loan)		
2016	→ Al-Shaab (loan)		
2016–2017	→ Dibba Al-Fujairah (loan)		
2018–2019	Al-Dhaid		
- * Club domestic league appearances and goals

Ibrahim Qanber (Arabic:إبراهيم قنبر) (born 1 April 1990) is an Emirati footballer who plays as a midfielder, most recently for Al-Dhaid.
