= Ahmed Sulaiman =

Emirati footballer (born 1987)

Personal information
- Full name: Ahmed Sulaiman Ali Obaid Al-Dhanhani
- Date of birth: 29 August 1987 (age 39)
- Place of birth: United Arab Emirates
- Height: 1.80 m (5 ft 11 in)
- Position: Defender

Team information
- Current team: Al Dhaid
- Number: 14

Youth career
- Al Ittihad

Senior career*
Years	Team	Apps	(Gls)
2007–2013	Kalba	22	(0)
2013–2015	Al Dhafra	41	(1)
2015–2016	Al Shabab	22	(0)
2020–2021	Al Bataeh		
2021–2023	Hatta		
2023–2024	United		
2024–2025	Al Arabi		
2025–	Al Dhaid		
- * Club domestic league appearances and goals

Ahmed Sulaiman (Arabic:أحمد سليمان) (born 29 August 1987) is an Emirati footballer. He currently plays for Al Dhaid as a defender.
