= Basiru =

Basiru may refer to:

== People ==
=== First name ===
- Basiru Alhassan (born 2000), Ghanaian footballer
- Basiru Mahoney, Gambian lawyer, politician, and judge

=== Surname ===
- Ajibola Basiru (born 1972), Nigerian lawyer and politician
