= Dibba Al-Hisn =

Dibba Al-Hisn دبا الحصن
- Town
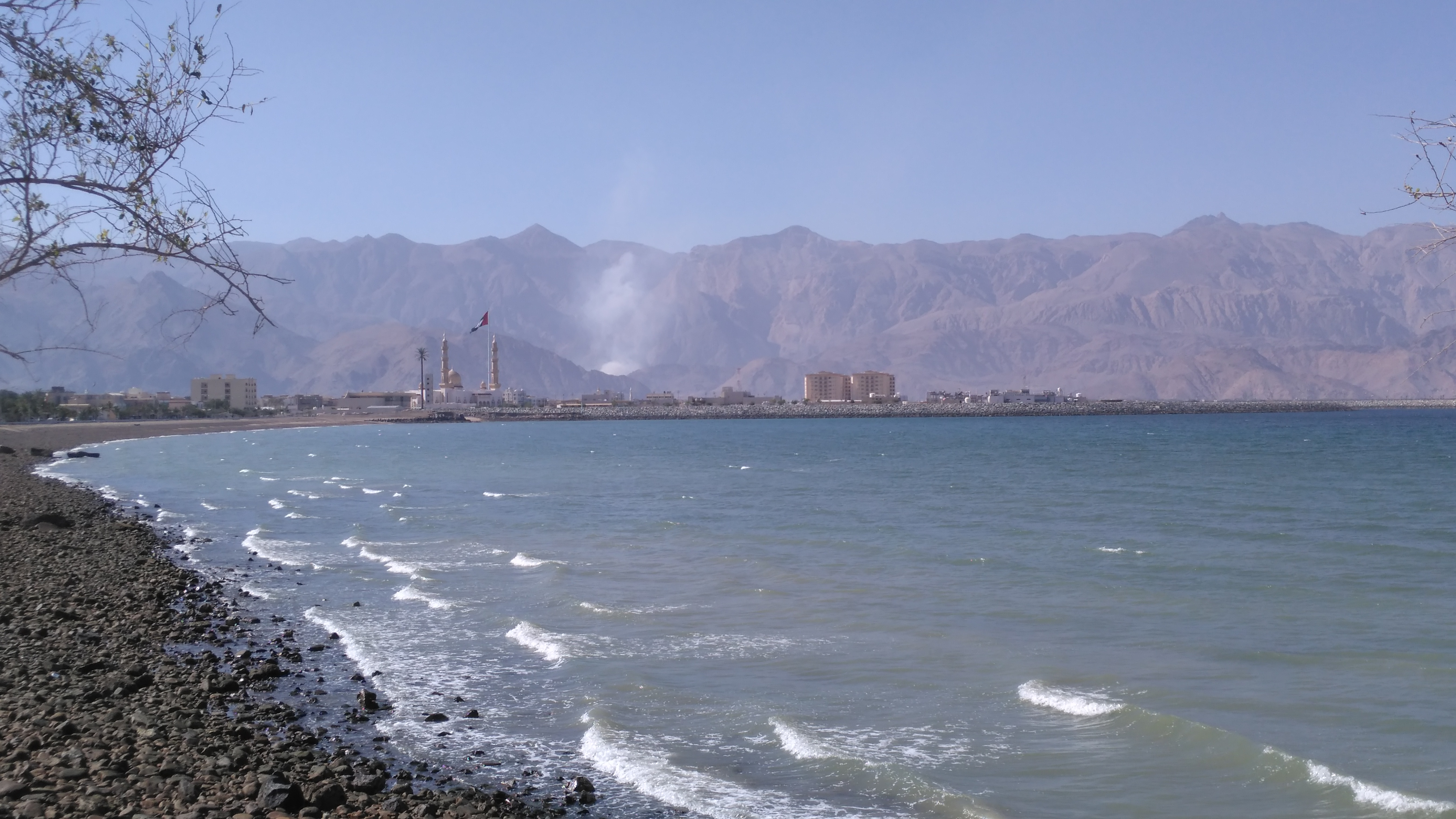
- Dibba Al-Hisn skyline seen from the beach

- Location of Dibba Al-Hisn Dibba Al-Hisn (Persian Gulf)
- Coordinates: 25°37′8″N 56°16′24″E
- Country: United Arab Emirates
- Emirate: Al-Sharjah
- Named for: The fort located by the sea or the vanished Portuguese fort

Government
  - Emir: Sultan bin Muhammad Al-Qasimi

Area
  - Total: 438 ha (1,080 acres)

Population (2017-07-01)
  - Total: 12,573
  - Density: 2,870/km^{2} (7,430/sq mi)
- Time zone: UTC+4 (UAE standard time)
- Website: http://www.dibba.gov.ae/

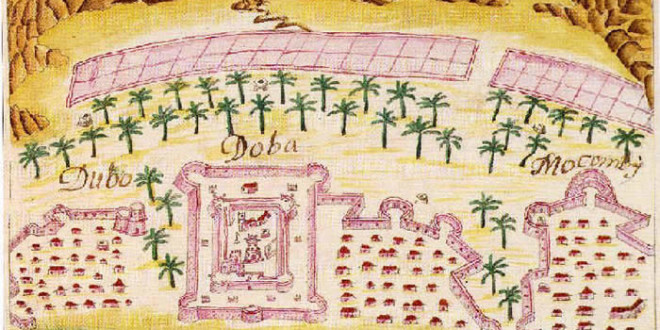
Portuguese Fortress of Dibba Al-Hisn (Doba) in the 17th century - Lyvro de Plantaformas e Fortalezas da India.

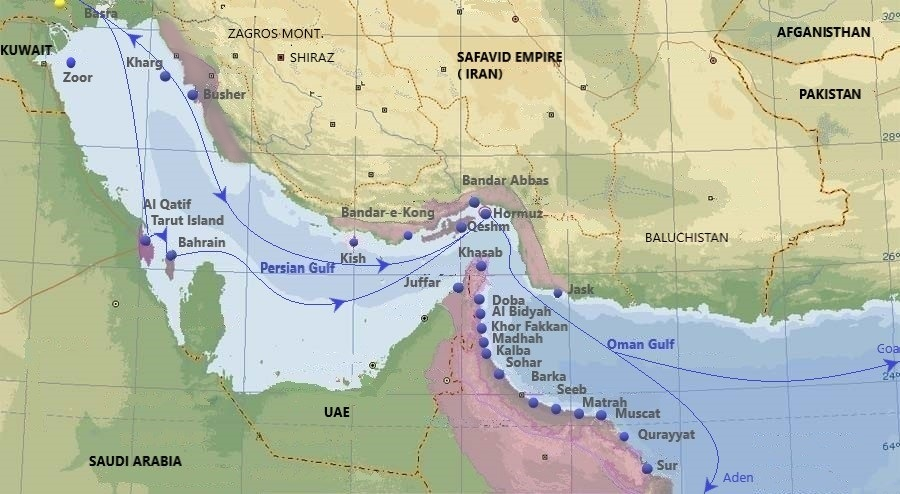
Purple - Portuguese in Persian Gulf in the 16th and 17th century. Main cities, ports and routes.

Dibba Al-Hisn (Arabic: دبا الحصن, white Dibba) is a semi-exclave of the emirate of Sharjah, one of the seven United Arab Emirates. It is bordered by the Gulf of Oman from the east, Dibba Al-Baya (a province of Oman in Musandam) from the north, and Dibba Al-Fujairah (a city in the Emirate of Fujairah) from the south. It is also geographically part of the Dibba region. It is the smallest in size among the Dibbas. It is mostly known for its fish market and the ancient fortress from which it got its name. Also, it is known for its high density of population relative to the other Dibbas.

== History ==
=== Pre-Islamic period ===
Dibba Al-Hisn has been an important site of maritime trade and settlement since the pre-Islamic era. Although there is slight information, mainly from tombs, of settlement during the later second millennium and early first millennium BCE, contemporary with such sites as Shimal, Tell Abraq and Rumeilah, and of scattered occupation during the period of al-Dur and Mileiha, most mention of Dibba is in the period just prior to and after the coming of Islam. Under the Sasanians and their Omani clients the Al-Juland, an important market existed at Dibba. Dibba was sometimes the capital of Oman. According to Ibn Habib, "merchants from Sindh, India, China, people of the East and West" came to it.

=== Islamic period ===
- (632 - 633 CE) Soon after the death of Muhammad, a rebellion broke out at Dibba, and a faction of the Azd, led by Laqit bin Malik, nicknamed ذو التاج Thu at-Taj ("The Crowned"), rejected Islam by refusing to pay the Zakat — the Islamic principle of giving a percentage of one's income to charity. Since Zakat is one of the five pillars of Islam, this faction committed an act of Ridda (apostasy), according to Islamic beliefs. Laqit was killed by an envoy of the caliph Abu Bakr, in accord with one tradition, in what may have been a relatively small struggle; however, other sources, including Al-Tabari, say that at least 10,000 rebels were killed in one of the biggest battles of the Ridda wars (حروب الردة). The plain behind the Omani part of Dibba, Dibba Al-Baya, still contains a large cemetery, which, according to local tradition, represents the fallen apostates of Dibba (المرتدين Al-Murtaddeen).
- During the time of the Abbasid caliph Al Mu'tadid (870 - 892 CE), a great battle was fought at Dibba during the conquest of Oman by the Abbasid governor of Iraq and Bahrain, Muhammad bin Nur.

=== Colonial period ===
==== Portuguese occupation (1624 - 1648 CE) ====
Dibba Al-Hisn is believed to be the site where the Portuguese during the Habsburg Dynasty built a fort and a wall around the city. In August 1648, the Arabs besieged Muscat, Oman, and on October 31, 1648, a treaty was signed between the two opponents. The terms required the Portuguese to abandon the fortress of Kuriyat, Dibba Al-Hisn and Matrah (Oman).

=== Modern Time ===
Dibba Al-Hisn has transformed in a short period of time from an oasis residing in the past, into a thriving city that is being renewed at an increasing pace.

There were land disputes between Dibba Al-Hisn and Dibba Al-Baya, but they were resolved in the 1990s.

=== List of rulers of Dibba ===
- Under a Hakim
- Sheikh Ahmad ibn Sultan al-Qasimi (1871–1883).
- Sheikh Rashid ibn Ahmad al-Qasimi (1883–1937)

— with Sheikh Khalid II ibn Ahmad al-Qasimi (1903–1924)

- Sheikh Ahmad ibn Rashid al-Qasimi (1937–1951)
- reincorporated into Sharjah

Fishing traps in the old port in Dibba Al-Hisn

This timeline states events related to Dibba of UAE — Dibba Al-Fujairah and Dibba Al-Hisn.

- June 3, 1973: UAE president Sheikh Zayed began an inspection tour of the Northern Emirates, including Ras al-Khaimah, Al-Rams, Dibba Al-Hisn, Dibba Al-Fujairah, Khor Fakkan, Fujairah, and Masafi.
- September 10, 1974: Mohammad Khalifa Al Kindi signed a AED 52 million contract for the construction and surfacing of the road between Khor Fakkan and Dibba (the E99 road).
- June 9, 1975: The Ministry of Communication in a memorandum asked the Supreme Council of the Federation for the authority to supervise transportation, the control of air space in all airports and all agreements made with airline companies in all the emirates. The Council of Ministers approved the construction of the highway between Dibba Al-Fujairah and Masafi at a cost of AED 94.5 Million.
- July 23, 1976: Sheikh Zayed visited Fujairah. He also inspected the new Dibba Al-Fujairah - Khor Fakkan highway project (the E99 road) and visited Falaj Al-Mualla village.
- January 19, 1977: The Federal Council of Ministers approved a number of projects costing AED 56 million, including water distribution in Ajman and Dibba.
- January 10, 1978: Sultan bin Muhammad Al-Qasimi opened the wharf at Dibba Al-Hisn, which can accommodate 80 fishing boats. Part of the port will be used as ships' berths.
- February 7, 1978: The Ministry of Water and Electricity announced that the east coast from Dibba to Fujairah had been connected through an electrical feeder station.
- January 11, 1979: The AED 14 million electrical plant in Dibba Al-Fujairah was opened by Hamad bin Mohammed Al Sharqi.
- May 27, 1980: Sheikh Rashid bin Saeed Al Maktoum ordered the immediate commencement of the 100-bed extension to the Dibba Al-Fujairah and Khor Fakkan hospitals.
- November 19, 1980: Sheikh Hamad bin Mohammed Al Sharqi laid the foundation stone for the AED 350 million Fujairah Cement Factory in Dibba Al-Fujairah.

== Sports ==
Dibba Al-Hisn Sports Club Main Entrance

Dibba Al-Hisn fostered a sports club, Dibba Al-Hisn, established in 1980. Its football section has been competing in the UAE First Division League. The first team to be founded in Dibba Al-Hisn was Al-Fajr club in 1967 while Al-Dhafir club was founded during a training session in Kuwait. Around 1974, the two clubs agreed to merge as Al Hisn club in 1974. In 1980, the team officially registered into the UAE football league under the name of Dibba Al Hisn Sports Club. The team has mostly spent their time in UAE's 2nd tier football, only getting promoted once in 2005, the 2005–06 season remains the only time the club experienced top flight football.

=== Season-by-season football record ===
Season	Lvl.	Tms.	Pos.	President's Cup	League Cup
2008–09	2	16	8th	Round of 16	—
2009–10	2	8	8th	Preliminary Round	—
2010–11	3	10	6th	Preliminary Round	—
2011–12	3	8	3rd	Round of 16	—
2012–13	2	14	5th	Preliminary Round	—
2013–14	2	13	6th	Preliminary Round	—
2014–15	2	11	7th	Preliminary Round	—
2015–16	2	9	6th	Preliminary Round	—
2016–17	2	12	5th	Preliminary Round	—
2017–18	2	12	9th	Preliminary Round	—
2018–19	2	10	5th	Round of 16	—
2019–20^{a}	2	11	2nd	Round of 16	—
2020–21	2	11	5th	Preliminary Round	—
2021–22	2	15	3rd	Preliminary Round	—
2022–23	2	17	3rd	Preliminary Round	—
2023–24	2	17	2nd	—	
2024–25	1	14			

_{Notes 2019–20 UAE football season was cancelled due to the COVID-19 pandemic in the United Arab Emirates.}

== Education ==
=== Universities ===
A branch of the Community College of the University of Sharjah is available in Dibba Al-Hisn.

=== Public schools ===
Alkhalidya Secondary School

== Transportation ==
- Dibba Al-Hisn can be accessed from one road through UAE and two roads from Musandam (Oman).
- No airports are available in Dibba Al-Hisn due to its small size. There is an airstrip in Dibba Al-Baya for transportation to Musandam.
- Taxi service is available. There is a provision for metered taxi service to be provided from the Emirate of Sharjah.
