= Issam Shaitit =

Moroccan association football player

Issam Shaitit عصام سحيتيت
Personal information
- Full name: Issam Shaitit
- Date of birth: 14 February 2000 (age 26)
- Place of birth: Morocco
- Height: 1.75 m (5 ft 9 in)
- Position: Winger

Team information
- Current team: Dibba Al-Hisn
- Number: 57

Youth career
- –2019: Olympique Khouribga
- 2019–2020: Ajman

Senior career*
Years	Team	Apps	(Gls)
2020–2023	Ajman	24	(0)
2022–2023	→ Emirates (loan)	18	(3)
2023–2026	Al-Hamriyah		
2026–	Dibba Al-Hisn		
- * Club domestic league appearances and goals

Issam Shaitit (Arabic:عصام سحيتيت) (born 14 February 2000) is a Moroccan footballer who plays as a winger for Dibba Al-Hisn.

== Career statistics ==
=== Club ===
As of 29 December 2020.

Club	Season	League			Cup		Continental		Other		Total	
Club	Season	Division	Apps	Goals	Apps	Goals	Apps	Goals	Apps	Goals	Apps	Goals
Ajman Club	2020–21	UAE Pro League	9	0	2	1	0	0	0	0	11	1
Career total			9	0	2	1	0	0	0	0	11	1
