= Basiru Alhassan =

Ghanaian footballer

Personal information
- Date of birth: 29 April 2000 (age 26)
- Height: 1.79 m (5 ft 10 in)
- Position: Midfielder

Team information
- Current team: Al Dhaid
- Number: 5

Youth career
- –2018: Tudu Mighty Jets
- 2018–2019: Dreams
- 2018–2019: → Sparta Prague B (loan)

Senior career*
Years	Team	Apps	(Gls)
2019–2021	Al-Wasl	6	(0)
2020–2021	→ Dibba Al-Hisn (loan)		
2021–2022	Al-Hamriyah		
2022	Hatta		
2022–2023	Dibba Al Fujairah	1	(0)
2023	Emirates		
2023–2024	Al Arabi		
2024–	Al Dhaid		
- * Club domestic league appearances and goals as of 17:17, 1 February 2020 (UTC)

Basiru Alhassan (born 29 April 2000) is a Ghanaian footballer who plays for Al Dhaid as a midfielder.

== Career statistics ==
=== Club ===
As of 1 February 2020.

Club	Season	League			Cup		Continental		Other		Total	
Club	Season	Division	Apps	Goals	Apps	Goals	Apps	Goals	Apps	Goals	Apps	Goals
Al-Wasl	2019–20	UAE Pro League	4	0	2 (Note: Appearances in the UAE League Cup)	0	0	0	0	0	6	0
Career total			4	0	2	0	0	0	0	0	6	0
