= Mohammed Yaqoub (footballer) =

Emirati association football player (born 1989)

Mohammed Yaqoub محمد يعقوب
Personal information
- Full name: Mohammed Yaqoub Abbas Al-Mazmi
- Date of birth: 8 June 1989 (age 37)
- Place of birth: Emirates
- Height: 1.70 m (5 ft 7 in)
- Position: Right-back

Youth career
- 2003–2008: Ajman

Senior career*
Years	Team	Apps	(Gls)
2008–2012	Ajman		
2012–2014	Al-Wasl		
2014–2020	Ajman		
2020–2022	Dibba		
2023–2024	Al-Hamriyah		
- * Club domestic league appearances and goals

Mohammed Yaqoub (Arabic:محمد يعقوب) (born 8 June 1989) is an Emirati footballer. He currently plays as a right back.

== Career ==
He formerly played for Ajman, Al-Wasl, Dibba, and Al-Hamriyah.
