= E99 =

E99 can refer to:

- King's Indian Defense, Encyclopaedia of Chess Openings code
- E 99 road (United Arab Emirates), a road in the United Arab Emirates
- Embraer R-99, an aircraft type
- European route E99, European road in Turkey
- Element 99, a fictional element in the video game Singularity.
