= Mohamed Bouherrafa =

French association football player (born 2000)

Personal information
- Date of birth: 9 September 2000 (age 26)
- Height: 1.84 m (6 ft 0 in)
- Position: Defender

Youth career
- LaLiga Academy HPC

Senior career*
Years	Team	Apps	(Gls)
2018–2021	Al-Nasr	0	(0)
2021	Al-Dhafra	0	(0)
2022–2023	Masfout		
- * Club domestic league appearances and goals as of 14:48, 24 February 2021 (UTC)

Mohamed Bouherrafa also called as Neto (born 9 September 2000) is a French footballer who plays as a defender.

== Career statistics ==
=== Club ===
As of 24 February 2021.

Club	Season	League			Cup		Continental		Other		Total	
Club	Season	Division	Apps	Goals	Apps	Goals	Apps	Goals	Apps	Goals	Apps	Goals
Al-Nasr	2018–19	UAE Pro League	0	0	1 (Note: Appearances in the UAE League Cup)	0	0	0	0	0	1	0
Al-Nasr	2019–20	UAE Pro League	0	0	0	0	0	0	0	0	0	0
Al-Nasr	2020–21	UAE Pro League	0	0	0	0	0	0	0	0	0	0
Al-Nasr	Total		0	0	1	0	0	0	0	0	1	0
Al-Dhafra	2020–21	UAE Pro League	0	0	0	0	0	0	0	0	0	0
Career total			0	0	1	0	0	0	0	0	1	0
