= Humaid Ahmed Al Hammadi =

Emirati footballer (born 1988)

Humaid Ahmed
Personal information
- Full name: Humaid Ahmed Al Hammadi
- Date of birth: 7 February 1988 (age 38)
- Place of birth: United Arab Emirates
- Height: 1.70 m (5 ft 7 in)
- Position: Winger

Youth career
- Al-Sharjah

Senior career*
Years	Team	Apps	(Gls)
2008–2012	Al-Sharjah	33	(3)
2012–2014	Al Nasr	35	(1)
2014–2016	Fujairah	30	(2)
2016–2018	Al Jazira	7	(0)
2018–2020	Fujairah	3	(0)
2021–2022	Al Hamriyah	7	(0)
2022–2023	Masfout	5	(0)
2023–2024	Al Arabi		
- * Club domestic league appearances and goals

Humaid Ahmed (Arabic:حميد أحمد) (born 7 February 1988) is an Emirati footballer. He currently plays as a winger.
