= Lahej Al-Nofali =

Emirati footballer (born 1990)

Personal information
- Full name: Lahej Saleh Haboush Al-Nofali
- Date of birth: 15 April 1990 (age 36)
- Place of birth: United Arab Emirates
- Height: 1.72 m (5 ft 7 1/2 in)
- Position: Midfielder

Team information
- Current team: Al Dhaid
- Number: 22

Youth career
- 2003–2010: Baniyas

Senior career*
Years	Team	Apps	(Gls)
2010–2011	Baniyas		
2013–2014	Dibba Al-Hisn		
2014–2015	Al Urooba		
2015–2020	Hatta		
2020	Shabab Al-Ahli		
2020–2022	Hatta		
2022–2023	Dibba Al-Hisn		
2023–2024	Al Dhafra		
2024–	Al Dhaid		
- * Club domestic league appearances and goals

Lahej Al-Nofali (Arabic:لاحج النوفلي) (born 15 April 1990) is an Emirati footballer. He currently plays for Al Dhaid as a midfielder.
