= Abdulaziz Al-Kaabi =

Emirati footballer (born 1998)

Abdulaziz Al-Kaabi عبد العزيز الكعبي
Personal information
- Full name: Abdulaziz Salem Ali Al-Kaabi
- Date of birth: 12 August 1998 (age 28)
- Place of birth: Dubai, United Arab Emirates
- Height: 1.78 m (5 ft 10 in)
- Position: Left back

Team information
- Current team: Al-Hamriyah
- Number: 3

Youth career
- 2010–2015: Dubai

Senior career*
Years	Team	Apps	(Gls)
2015–2017	Dubai		
2017–2020	Shabab Al-Ahli	10	(0)
2020–2024	Sharjah	15	(0)
2021–2022	→ Al-Nasr (loan)	15	(0)
2024–2025	Kalba	2	(0)
2025–	Al-Hamriyah	0	(0)
- * Club domestic league appearances and goals

Abdulaziz Al-Kaabi (Arabic:عبد العزيز الكعبي) (born 12 August 1998) is an Emirati footballer who plays as a left back for Al-Hamriyah.

== Career ==
=== Dubai ===
Al-Kaabi started his career at Dubai and is a product of the Dubai's youth system.

=== Shabab Al-Ahli ===
He was playing with Dubai and after merging Al Ahli, Al-Shabab and Dubai clubs under the name Shabab Al-Ahli Club he was joined to Shabab Al-Ali. On 11 January 2018, Al-Kaabi made his professional debut for Shabab Al-Ahli against Hatta in the Pro League .

=== Sharjah ===
On 9 August 2020, he left Shabab Al-Ali and signed with Sharjah.
