= Caíque (footballer, born 18 July 2000) =

Brazilian footballer

Personal information
- Full name: Caíque de Jesus da Silva
- Date of birth: 18 July 2000 (age 26)
- Place of birth: Salvador, Brazil
- Height: 1.91 m (6 ft 3 in)
- Position: Forward

Team information
- Current team: Bashundhara Kings

Youth career
- –2018: Jacuipense

Senior career*
Years	Team	Apps	(Gls)
2018–2019	Jacuipense	0	(0)
2019–2020	Bahia	0	(0)
2020–2023	Al-Nasr	5	(1)
2021–2022	→ Khor Fakkan (loan)	12	(4)
2022–2023	→ Al Urooba (loan)		
2023	→ Khor Fakkan (loan)	6	(0)
2023–2024	Dibba Al-Hisn		
2024–2025	Jacuipense	9	(1)
2025	Itabuna	0	(0)
2025	Santa Catarina	0	(0)
2026	Cianorte	6	(1)
2026	Primavera	10	(6)
2026	Vila Nova	1	(0)
2026–	Bashundhara Kings		
- * Club domestic league appearances and goals as of 7 October 2026 (UTC)

Caíque de Jesus da Silva (born 18 July 2000), commonly known as Caíque , is a Brazilian footballer who plays as a forward for Bashundhara Kings.

== Club career ==
Caíque spent four seasons in the United Arab Emirates between 2020 and 2024, representing several clubs, including Khor Fakkan.

In 2024, he returned to Brazil and joined Jacuipense ahead of the Campeonato Baiano. He subsequently played for Itabuna, Santa Catarina and Cianorte, before joining Primavera, a club competing in the Campeonato Brasileiro Série D.

In June 2026, Caíque joined Campeonato Brasileiro Série B club Vila Nova.

Later in 2026, Caíque signed for Bashundhara Kings of the Bangladesh Football League.

== Career statistics ==
=== Club ===
As of 29 December 2020.

Club	Season	League			State League		Cup		Continental		Other		Total	
Club	Season	Division	Apps	Goals	Apps	Goals	Apps	Goals	Apps	Goals	Apps	Goals	Apps	Goals
Jacuipense	2018	Série D	0	0	1 (Note: Appearances in the Campeonato Baiano)	0	0	0	0	0	0	0	1	0
Jacuipense	Jacuipense Total		0	0	1	0	0	0	0	0	0	0	1	0
Bahia	2019	Série A	0	0	7	1	0	0	0	0	2 (Note: Appearances in the Copa do Nordeste)	1	9	2
Bahia	2020	Série A	0	0	8	1	0	0	0	0	0	0	8	1
Bahia	Bahia Total		0	0	15	2	0	0	0	0	2	1	17	3
Al-Nasr Dubai	2020–21	UAE Pro League	3	0	–		0 (Note: Appearances in the UAE League Cup)	0	0	0	0	0	3	0
Career total			3	0	16	2	0	0	0	0	2	1	21	3
