= Sabeel Ghazi =

Emirati footballer (born 1994)

Personal information
- Full name: Sabeel Sabeel Ghazi Al-Madani
- Date of birth: 17 November 1994 (age 31)
- Place of birth: United Arab Emirates
- Height: 1.77 m (5 ft 10 in)
- Position: Defender

Team information
- Current team: Al Dhaid
- Number: 17

Youth career
- 2006–2008: Al-Ahli
- 2009–2013: Al-Nasr

Senior career*
Years	Team	Apps	(Gls)
2013–2019	Al-Nasr	1	(0)
2017–2018	→ Hatta (loan)	9	(0)
2018–2019	→ Emirates (loan)	14	(0)
2019–2020	Hatta	0	(0)
2020	→ Emirates (loan)		
2020–2021	Emirates		
2021–2022	Dibba Al-Hisn		
2022–	Al Dhaid		
- * Club domestic league appearances and goals

Sabeel Ghazi (Arabic:سبيل غازي) (born 17 November 1994) is an Emirati footballer who plays for Al Dhaid as a defender.
