= Juninho (footballer, born 2000) =

Brazilian footballer

Personal information
- Full name: Antonio Valmor Assis Da Silva Junior
- Date of birth: 6 March 2000 (age 26)
- Place of birth: Guarapuava, Brazil
- Height: 1.69 m (5 ft 7 in)
- Position: Forward

Team information
- Current team: Al Bataeh (on loan from Al-Nasr)
- Number: 7

Youth career
- –2019: Ponte Preta

Senior career*
Years	Team	Apps	(Gls)
2019	Ponte Preta	0	(0)
2019–2024	Khor Fakkan	81	(8)
2021	→ Al-Sharjah (loan)	7	(1)
2024–	Al-Nasr	1	(0)
2025	→ Dibba Al-Hisn (loan)	10	(0)
2026–	→ Al Bataeh (loan)	2	(0)
- * Club domestic league appearances and goals as of 17:17, 1 February 2020 (UTC)

Antonio Valmor Assis Da Silva Junior (born 6 March 2000), commonly known as Juninho, is a Brazilian footballer who plays for Al Bataeh, on loan from Al-Nasr.

== Career statistics ==
=== Club ===
As of 1 February 2020.

Club	Season	League			Cup		Continental		Other		Total	
Club	Season	Division	Apps	Goals	Apps	Goals	Apps	Goals	Apps	Goals	Apps	Goals
Ponte Preta B	2019	–							1 (Note: Appearances in the Copa Paulista)	0	1	0
Ponte Preta	2019	Série B	0	0	0	0	0	0	1 (Note: Appearances in the Campeonato Paulista)	0	1	0
Khor Fakkan	2019–20	UAE Pro League	10	1	5 (Note: Appearances in the UAE League Cup)	0	0	0	0	0	15	1
Career total			10	1	5	0	0	0	2	0	17	1
