= Saeed Suwaidan =

Emirati footballer (born 1997)

Saeed Suwaidan سعيد سويدان
Personal information
- Full name: Saeed Ali Ibrahim Suwaidan
- Date of birth: 19 May 1997 (age 29)
- Place of birth: Emirates
- Height: 1.74 m (5 ft 9 in)
- Position: Right-back

Team information
- Current team: Al-Hamriyah
- Number: 23

Youth career
- 2010–2017: Al-Nasr

Senior career*
Years	Team	Apps	(Gls)
2017–2024	Al-Nasr	36	(0)
2022–2023	→ Al Bataeh (loan)	13	(0)
2023–2024	→ Hatta (loan)	2	(0)
2025–	Al-Hamriyah	-	(0)

International career
- Under 23 UAE
- * Club domestic league appearances and goals

Saeed Suwaidan (Arabic:سعيد سويدان; born 19 May 1997) is an Emirati footballer. He currently plays as a right back for Al-Hamriyah.

== Career ==
Suwaidan started his career at Al-Nasr and is a product of the Al-Nasr's youth system. On 11 January 2018, Suwaidan made his professional debut for Al-Nasr against Al-Sharjah in the Pro League, replacing Salem Saleh.

== Honours ==
Al-Nasr SC

- UAE League Cup: 2015, 2020
- UAE President's Cup: 2014–15
