= Alexandre Matão =

Brazilian footballer (born 1986)

Personal information
- Full name: Alexandre Aparecido Reche Bernardes
- Date of birth: 26 March 1986 (age 40)
- Place of birth: Jaboticabal, São Paulo, Brazil
- Height: 1.80 m (5 ft 11 in)
- Position: Forward

Youth career
- 2002–2003: SE Matonense
- 2004: Mogi Mirim
- 2005: Fluminense
- 2005: União Barbarense
- 2005: Juventude

Senior career*
Years	Team	Apps	(Gls)
2006–2007	Brasil de Pelotas		
2007–2008	São José		
2008	Farroupilha		
2008	GAIS	8	(0)
2009	Glória		
2009–2010	Gil Vicente	15	(1)
2010	→ Carregado (loan)	13	(5)
2010	União	13	(4)
2011	Internacional-SM	0	(0)
2011	Farroupilha		
2011	Vissai Ninh Bình		
2012	Guarany Camaquã		
2012	São José		
2012	Brasil de Pelotas	3	(0)
2013	Cerâmica	0	(0)
2013	Internacional-SM		
2014	Santa Cruz-RS		
2015	São Paulo-RS	0	(0)
2015	Rio Branco	0	(0)
2015–2016	Saham Club		
2016	Al Hala		
2016–2017	Ras Al Khaima		
2017–2018	Dibba Al-Hisn		
2018–2019	Al-Dhaid		
2019–2020	Al-Arabi		
2020–2021	Al-Akhdoud		
- * Club domestic league appearances and goals as of 22:16, 28 March 2019 (UTC)

Alexandre Aparecido Reche Bernardes (born 26 March 1986), commonly known as Alexandre Matão, is a Brazilian footballer who currently plays as a forward.

== Career statistics ==
=== Club ===
As of 6 January 2019.

Club	Season	League			State League		National Cup		League Cup		Other		Total	
Club	Season	Division	Apps	Goals	Apps	Goals	Apps	Goals	Apps	Goals	Apps	Goals	Apps	Goals
GAIS	2008	Allsvenskan	8	0	–		0	0	–		0	0	8	0
Gil Vicente	2009–10	Liga de Honra	15	1	–		3 (Note: Appearances in the Taça de Portugal)	1	4 (Note: Appearances in the Carlesburg Cup)	0	0	0	22	2
Carregado (loan)	2009–10	Liga de Honra	13	5	–		0	0	0	0	0	0	13	5
União	2010–11	Segunda Divisão	13	4	–		2	1	0	0	0	0	15	5
Internacional-SM	2011	–			5 (Note: Appearances in the Campeonato Gaúcho)	0	0	0	–		0	0	5	0
Brasil de Pelotas	2012	Série D	3	0	0	0	0	0	–		0	0	3	0
Cerâmica	2013	–			7	1	0	0	–		0	0	7	1
São Paulo-RS	2015	–			15	3	0	0	–		0	0	15	3
Rio Branco	2015	Série D	0	0	4 (Note: Appearances in the Campeonato Acreano)	6	1 (Note: Appearances in the Copa do Brasil)	1	–		0	0	5	7
Al Thaid	2018–19	First Division League	13	0	–		4 (Note: Appearances in the UAE President's Cup)	0	–		0	0	17	0
Career total			65	10	31	10	10	3	4	0	0	0	110	23
