= Saile Souza =

Brazilian footballer

Personal information
- Full name: Saile Samuel da Silva Souza
- Date of birth: 14 September 2000 (age 26)
- Height: 1.74 m (5 ft 9 in)
- Position: Midfielder

Team information
- Current team: Kalba
- Number: 20

Senior career*
Years	Team	Apps	(Gls)
2018–2019	Joinville	4	(0)
2019–2025	Baniyas	64	(3)
2025–	Kalba	0	(0)
- * Club domestic league appearances and goals as of 17:17, 15 January 2020 (UTC)

Saile Samuel da Silva Souza (born 14 September 2000), commonly known as Saile Souza is a Brazilian footballer who currently plays for Kalba.

== Career statistics ==
=== Club ===
As of 15 January 2020.

Club	Season	League			State League		National Cup		League Cup		Continental		Other		Total	
Club	Season	Division	Apps	Goals	Apps	Goals	Apps	Goals	Apps	Goals	Apps	Goals	Apps	Goals	Apps	Goals
Joinville	2018	Série C	3	0	0	0	0	0	–		–		0	0	3	0
Joinville	2019	Série D	1	0	2 (Note: Appearances in the Campeonato Catarinense)	0	0	0	–		–		0	0	3	0
Joinville	Total		4	0	2	0	0	0	0	0	0	0	0	0	6	0
Baniyas	2019–20	UAE Pro League	8	0	–		0	0	3 (Note: Appearances in the UAE League Cup)	0	0	0	0	0	11	0
Career total			12	0	2	0	0	0	3	0	0	0	0	0	17	0
