= Kamel Chafni =

Moroccan footballer (born 1982)

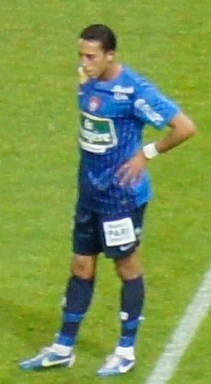
- Chafni in 2012

Personal information
- Date of birth: 11 June 1982 (age 44)
- Place of birth: Bordeaux, France
- Height: 1.81 m (5 ft 11 in)
- Positions: Attacking midfielder; left winger

Senior career*
| Years | Team | Apps | (Gls) |
| 2000–2002 | Libourne | 0 | (0) |
| 2002 | Sochaux | 0 | (0) |
| 2002–2004 | Besançon | 62 | (14) |
| 2004–2005 | Châteauroux | 28 | (8) |
| 2005–2007 | Ajaccio | 56 | (4) |
| 2007–2012 | Auxerre | 135 | (6) |
| 2012–2013 | Brest | 31 | (2) |
| 2013–2014 | Al Dhafra | 21 | (7) |
| 2014–2015 | Wydad | 5 | (0) |
| 2015 | Kawkab Marrakech | | |
| 2015–2016 | Ittihad Kalba | 11 | (3) |
| 2016–2017 | Al Urooba | 19 | (3) |
| 2017–2019 | Al Hamriyah | | |

International career
| 2007–2014 | Morocco | 10 | (0) |
- * Club domestic league appearances and goals

Kamel Chafni (Arabic: كمال الشافني; born 11 June 1982) is a former professional footballer who played as a midfielder.

Born in France, he represented Morocco at the international level, making his first appearance in a friendly match against Benin on 20 August 2008.
