= Saoud Abdulrazaq =

Emirati association football player (born 1998)

Saoud Abdulrazaq سعود عبد الرزاق
Personal information
- Full name: Saoud Abdulrazaq Saif Al-Muhairi
- Date of birth: 23 January 1998 (age 28)
- Place of birth: Emirates
- Height: 1.76 m (5 ft 9 in)
- Position: Midfielder

Team information
- Current team: Al-Hamriyah
- Number: 8

Youth career
- 2012–2016: Al Ahli

Senior career*
| Years | Team | Apps | (Gls) |
| 2016–2023 | Shabab Al-Ahli | 13 | (0) |
| 2017 | → Ajman (loan) | | |
| 2020 | → Khor Fakkan (loan) | 0 | (0) |
| 2023–2024 | Al-Nasr | 15 | (0) |
| 2024– | Al-Hamriyah | 0 | (0) |

International career
- Under 23 UAE
- * Club domestic league appearances and goals

Saoud Abdulrazaq (Arabic:سعود عبد الرزاق) (born 23 January 1998) is an Emirati footballer who plays for Al-Hamriyah as a midfielder.

== Career ==
=== Al Ahli ===
Saoud Abdulrazaq started his career at Al Ahli and is a product of the Al-Ahli's youth system.

=== Ajman ===
On 18 January 2017 left Al Ahli and signed with Ajman on loan until the end of the season.

=== Shabab Al-Ahli ===
He was playing with Al Ahli and after merging Al Ahli, Al-Shabab and Dubai clubs under the name Shabab Al-Ahli Club he was joined to Shabab Al-Ali. On 21 January 2018, Saoud Abdulrazaq made his professional debut for Shabab Al-Ahli against Ajman in the Pro League.

=== Khor Fakkan ===
On 3 February 2020 left Shabab Al-Ali and signed with Khor Fakkan on loan until the end of the season.
