= Hassan Yousuf =

Emirati association football player (born 1992)

Hassan Yousuf حسن يوسف
Personal information
- Full name: Hassan Yousuf Khamis Mubarak Khamis
- Date of birth: 29 January 1992 (age 34)
- Place of birth: Emirates
- Height: 1.72 m (5 ft 8 in)
- Position: Winger

Youth career
- 2005–2011: Al-Wasl

Senior career*
| Years | Team | Apps | (Gls) |
| 2011–2014 | Al-Wasl | 9 | (0) |
| 2014–2016 | Al-Fujairah | 23 | (0) |
| 2016–2018 | Al Urooba | | |
| 2018–2021 | Ittihad Kalba | 23 | (1) |
| 2021–2022 | Emirates | 7 | (0) |
| 2022–2024 | Al Urooba | | |
| 2024–2025 | Al Arabi | | |
- * Club domestic league appearances and goals

Hassan Yousuf (Arabic:حسن يوسف) (born 29 January 1992) is an Emirati footballer. He plays as a winger.

== Career ==
=== Al-Wasl ===
Hassan Yousuf started his career at Al-Wasl and is a product of the Al-Wasl's youth system. On 24 April 2011, Hassan Yousuf made his professional debut for Al-Wasl against Ittihad Kalba in the Pro League, replacing Alexandre Oliveira.

=== Al-Fujairah ===
On 8 August 2014, he left Al-Wasl and signed with Al-Fujairah. On 15 September 2014, Hassan Yousuf made his professional debut for Al-Fujairah against Emirates Club in the Pro League.

=== Al Urooba ===
In the 2016 season, he left Al-Fujairah and signed with Al Urooba.

=== Ittihad Kalba ===
On 27 May 2018, he left Al Urooba and signed with Ittihad Kalba. On 14 August 2018, Hassan Yousuf made his professional debut for Ittihad Kalba against Emirates Club in the Pro League.
