= Badr Bilal (Emirati footballer) =

Emirati association football player (born 1996)

Badr Bilal بدر بلال
Personal information
- Full name: Badr Bilal Al-Noubi
- Date of birth: 2 July 1996 (age 30)
- Place of birth: Emirates
- Height: 1.73 m (5 ft 8 in)
- Positions: Winger; right-back

Team information
- Current team: Masfout
- Number: 8

Youth career
- Al-Shaab

Senior career*
| Years | Team | Apps | (Gls) |
| 2014-2017 | Al-Shaab | | |
| 2017–2018 | Al Urooba | | |
| 2018–2020 | Masafi | | |
| 2020–2022 | Dibba Al Fujairah | | |
| 2022 | Al Bataeh | | |
| 2022–2023 | Masafi | | |
| 2023 | Al Urooba | | |
| 2023–2024 | Dibba Al-Hisn | | |
| 2024 | United | | |
| 2024–2025 | Hatta | | |
| 2025– | Masfout | | |
- * Club domestic league appearances and goals

Badr Bilal (Arabic:بدر بلال) (born 2 July 1996) is an Emirati footballer who plays for Masfout as a winger or a right-back.

== Career ==
He formerly played for Al-Shaab, Al Urooba, Masafi, Dibba Al Fujairah, Al Bataeh, and Dibba Al-Hisn.
