= Dibba Airport =

- IATA: BYB; ICAO: none

Summary
- Operator: Oman Airports Management Company S.A.O.C.
- Location: Dibba Al-Baya, Musandam Governorate, Oman
- Elevation AMSL: 45 ft / 14 m
- Coordinates: 25°36′50″N 56°14′40″E
- Website: http://www.omanairports.com/

Map
- Location of the airport in Oman BYB (Indian Ocean) BYB (Middle East) BYB (West and Central Asia) BYB (Asia)

Runways
Direction	Length		Surface
Direction	m	ft	Surface
06/24	870	2,854	Dirt
- GCM,

Dibba Airport (IATA: BYB) is an airport serving Dibba Al-Baya, a city in the Musandam Governorate of Oman. Dibba is a harbor city on the Gulf of Oman, and is divided between Oman and United Arab Emirates.

The airport is 3 kilometres (2 mi) inland from the Gulf. There is mountainous terrain southwest through north, and distant hills southeast. Approach and departure may cross into Emirates airspace.

== See also ==
- Transport in Oman
- List of airports in Oman
