= Abdoulaye Conde =

Guinean footballer

Personal information
- Date of birth: 1 February 2002 (age 24)
- Place of birth: Conakry, Guinea
- Height: 1.87 m (6 ft 2 in)
- Position: Midfielder

Team information
- Current team: Al-Arabi
- Number: 61

Youth career
- –2021: FC Atouga

Senior career*
Years	Team	Apps	(Gls)
2021–2022	Isloch Minsk Raion	8	(0)
2022–2025	Dibba		
2025–	Al-Arabi		
- * Club domestic league appearances and goals as of 10 April 2023

Abdoulaye Conde (born 1 February 2002) is a Guinean professional footballer who plays as a midfielder for Dibba.
