= Khaled Hmani =

Tunisian footballer

Personal information
- Date of birth: 3 January 1986 (age 40)
- Place of birth: Tunisia
- Position: Defender

Team information
- Current team: Al-Salt
- Number: 30

Senior career*
| Years | Team | Apps | (Gls) |
| 2008–2011 | US Monastir | | |
| 2011–2013 | ES Hammam-Sousse | | |
| 2013–2016 | CA Bizertin | | |
| 2016–2017 | East Riffa | | |
| 2017–2018 | Kerkennah | | |
| 2018– | Al-Salt | | |
- * Club domestic league appearances and goals as of 19:12, 19 January 2021 (UTC)

Khaled Hmani (Arabic: خالد هماني; born 3 January 1986) is a Tunisian professional footballer who plays as a defender for Jordanian club Al-Salt.
