= Hadi Al Masri =

Syrian footballer (born 1986)

Personal information
- Date of birth: 7 June 1986 (age 40)
- Place of birth: Syria
- Height: 1.86 m (6 ft 1 in)
- Position: Center back

Team information
- Current team: Al-Wathba

Senior career*
Years	Team	Apps	(Gls)
2006–2014	Nawair		
2014–2016	Al-Wahda		
2016	Bahrain SC		
2017	Al-Wahda		
2017–2018	Al Ahli SC		
2018	Al-Wehdat		
2019	Al-Wahda		
2019–	Al-Wathba		

International career^{‡}
2016–2018	Syria	8	(0)
- * Club domestic league appearances and goals ‡ National team caps and goals as of 16 October 2018

Hadi Al Masri (Arabic: هادي المصري; born 7 June 1986) is a Syrian footballer who plays for Al-Wathba and Syria national football team.

== Career ==
Al Masri played for Al-Wahda prior having a short spell with Bahrain SC. Later on, he returned to Al-Wahda, before moving to Al Ahli SC. In August 2018, he joined Al-Wehdat.

Al Masri was called to play for Syria at the age of 30.
