= Yousef Ramadan =

Egyptian footballer (born 1992)

Personal information
- Full name: Yousef Ramadan Abdulsemea
- Date of birth: 16 July 1992 (age 34)
- Place of birth: Egypt
- Position: Right-back

Senior career*
Years	Team	Apps	(Gls)
2011–2014	Al-Gharafa	14	(0)
2014–2019	Al Arabi	43	(1)
2019–2020	Al-Khor	15	(0)
2020–2023	Al-Markhiya		
- * Club domestic league appearances and goals

Yousef Ramadan (Arabic: يوسف رمضان; born 16 July 1992) is an Egyptian footballer who plays as a right back.
