= Dibba Al-Baya =

Dibba Al-Bay'ah Arabic: دِبَّا ٱلْبَيْعَة, romanized: Dibbā Al-Bayʿah
- Location in Oman
- Country: Oman
- Governorate: Musandam
- Wilayat: Dibba Al-Bay'ah

Area
  - Land: 491 km^{2} (190 sq mi)

Population (2018-07-01)
  - Total: 9,873
- estimate

Dibbā Al-Bayʿah (Arabic: دِبَّا ٱلْبَيْعَة) is geographically part of the Dibba region that faces the Arabian Sea, and is bordered by the United Arab Emirates to the south. It is a Wilayat in the Muhafazah of Musandam, Sultanate of Oman, on the east coast of the Arabian Peninsula. It is considered one of the most famous Omani cities known in the pre-Islamic days because it contains Dibba market, which is one of the most famous Arab markets that was known at that time, as merchants from different countries around the world such as India, Sindh and China used to come to it, and some historians, such as Al-Asmai, attribute this name to the locusts Creeping to express the large number of people in it, and the area of that city is approximately 37 km^{2}.

== Available services and trades ==
In Dibba, three schools for boys and girls have been created in the sphere of education, and these schools can accommodate roughly 1041 male and female students. There are also many services and development projects available. There are now several specialized treatment facilities in the field of health, and there is a modern road network that connects the state's villages, like the Dibba-Khasab mountain road, as well as a number of projects that have been launched recently, like the groundwater dam and water desalination projects. the art of grazing, raising cattle, and farming, including the production of citrus, dates, and fruits. There are also traditional industries such as the textile industry, the manufacture of small ships, boats, palm trees, and blacksmithing.

== Well-known folk customs and traditions ==
The inherited customs still practiced in Dibba can be broken down into two categories:

Non-material customs

Such as marriage, folk games, arts, hospitality, Newroz celebrations, blood donation, travel, carrying weapons, and religious practices.

Material folk customs

Such as women's industries, leather and arms manufacturing, agriculture, carpentry, clothing, house construction, and animal husbandry.

== Climate ==
In the evening, temperatures range from 34 to 37°C, with a dew point of 23.49°C, creating uncomfortable conditions due to the combination of heat and humidity. Precipitation is unlikely, while a gentle south-westerly breeze of 4–7 km/h provides little relief. The sky is mostly clear, with occasional small clouds.

== Natural attractions ==
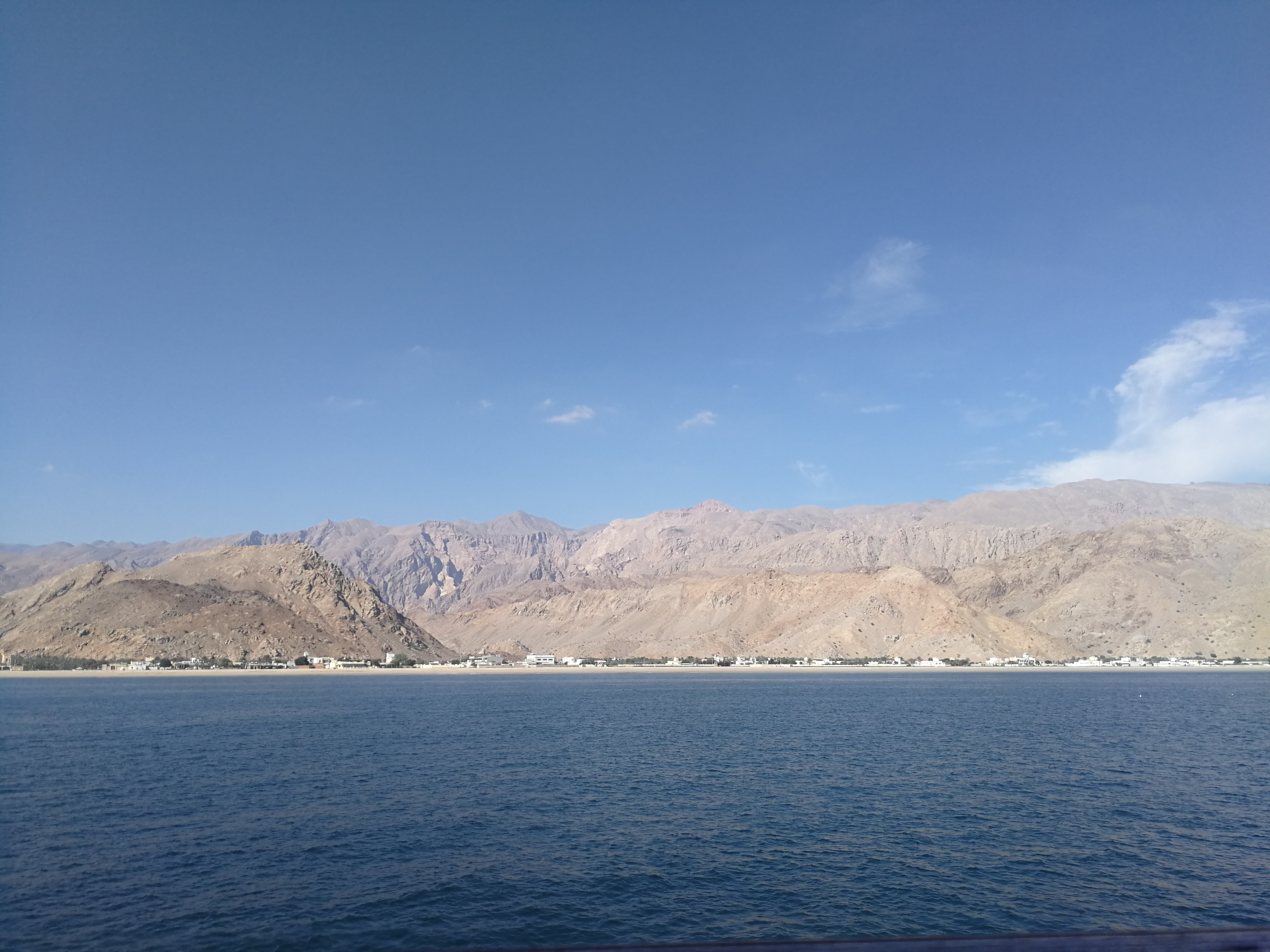
Dibba Al-Baya coastline

The city of Dibba is known for its diverse terrain, including plains and blue waters which contain coral reefs, dolphins, and other marine life. There are also mountains and bays, such Khor Al-Mim, Khor Zghi, and Khor Khafah, which are frequented by tourists. It is also well-known for the sand dunes, named Al-Sahma Al-Bayda, in the Al-South region, as well as valleys like Wadi Al-Khab and Wadi Al-Yadi. There are also springs that can produce running water, including the spring of Al-Saqqa water.

== See also ==
- Dibba Airport
- Bukha
- Madha
- Khasab
