= Onuoha Ogbonna =

Nigerian footballer

Personal information
- Date of birth: 14 August 1988 (age 38)
- Place of birth: Abia, Nigeria
- Position: Forward

Senior career*
Years	Team	Apps	(Gls)
2011–2015	US Monastir		
2015–2016	Al Riffa		
2016–?	Al Khaleej		
- * Club domestic league appearances and goals

Onuoha Ogbonna (born 14 August 1988) is a Nigerian football striker.
