= Dibba Al-Fujairah =

Human settlement in United Arab Emirates

Dibba Al-Fujairah دبا الفجيرة
- Town
- Dibba Al-Fujairah
- Location of Dibba Al-Fujairah
- Coordinates: 25°35′1″N 56°15′20″E
- Country: United Arab Emirates
- Emirate: Fujairah

Government
  - Emir: Hamad bin Mohammed Al Sharqi

Population
  - Estimate (July 2023): 49,333
- Time zone: UTC+4 (UAE standard time)
- Website: http://www.dibba.gov.ae/

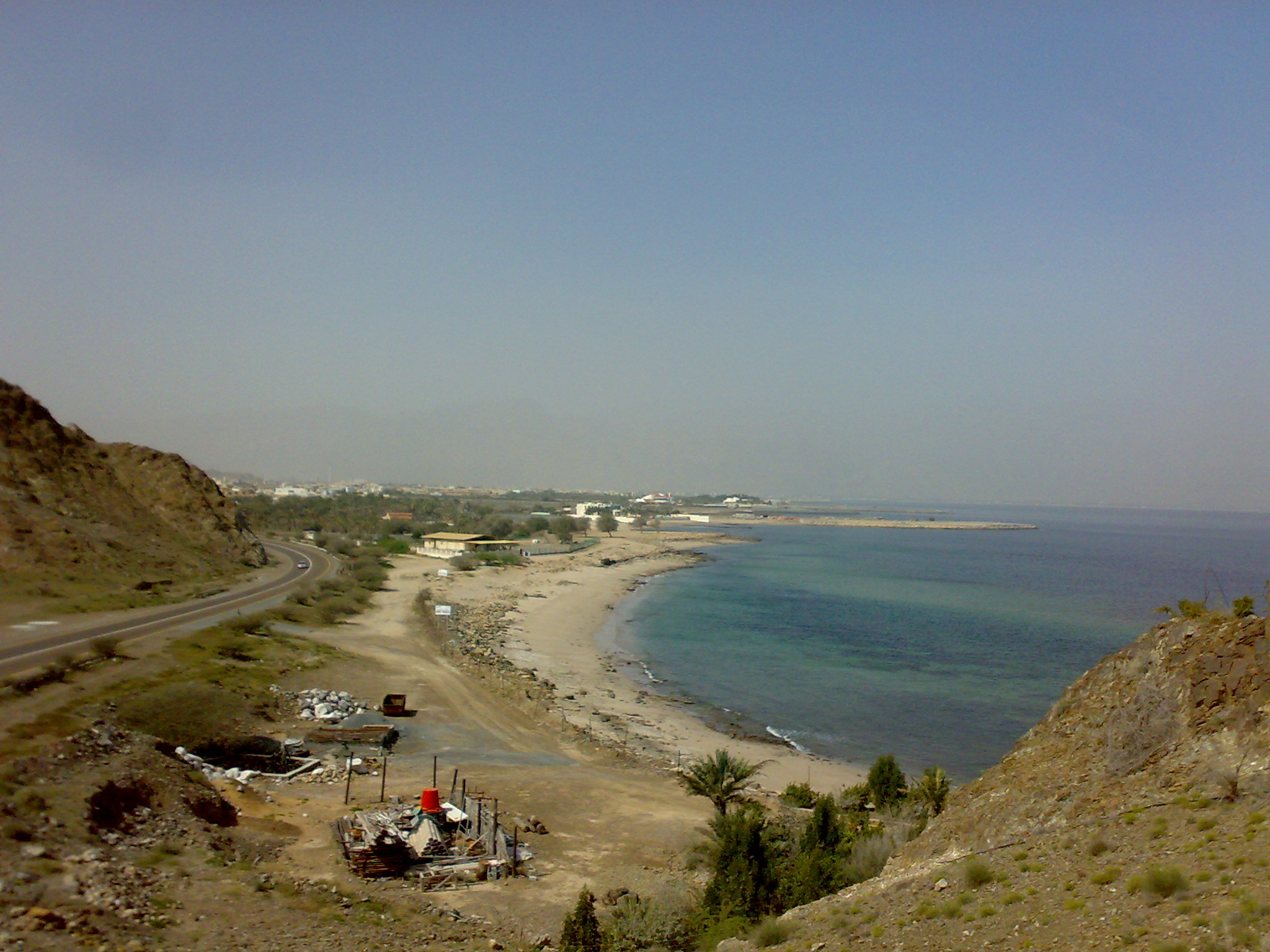
View on the coast at Dibba Al-Fujairah

Dibba Al-Fujairah (Arabic: دبا الفجيرة) is a city in the Emirate of Fujairah, located on the northeast part of the United Arab Emirates. It is geographically part of the Dibba region. Dibba Al-Fujairah is considered to be the second largest city in the emirate of Fujairah after Fujairah City. With an area of 68 square kilometres, Dibba Al-Fujairah had an estimated population of 41,017 (estimate) in July 2019. Dibba Al-Fujairah is mostly populated by the Al Dhanhani, Al Yammahi, Al Abdouli, Al Sereidi, Al Antali, Al Hindassi, and Al Zeyoudi tribes.

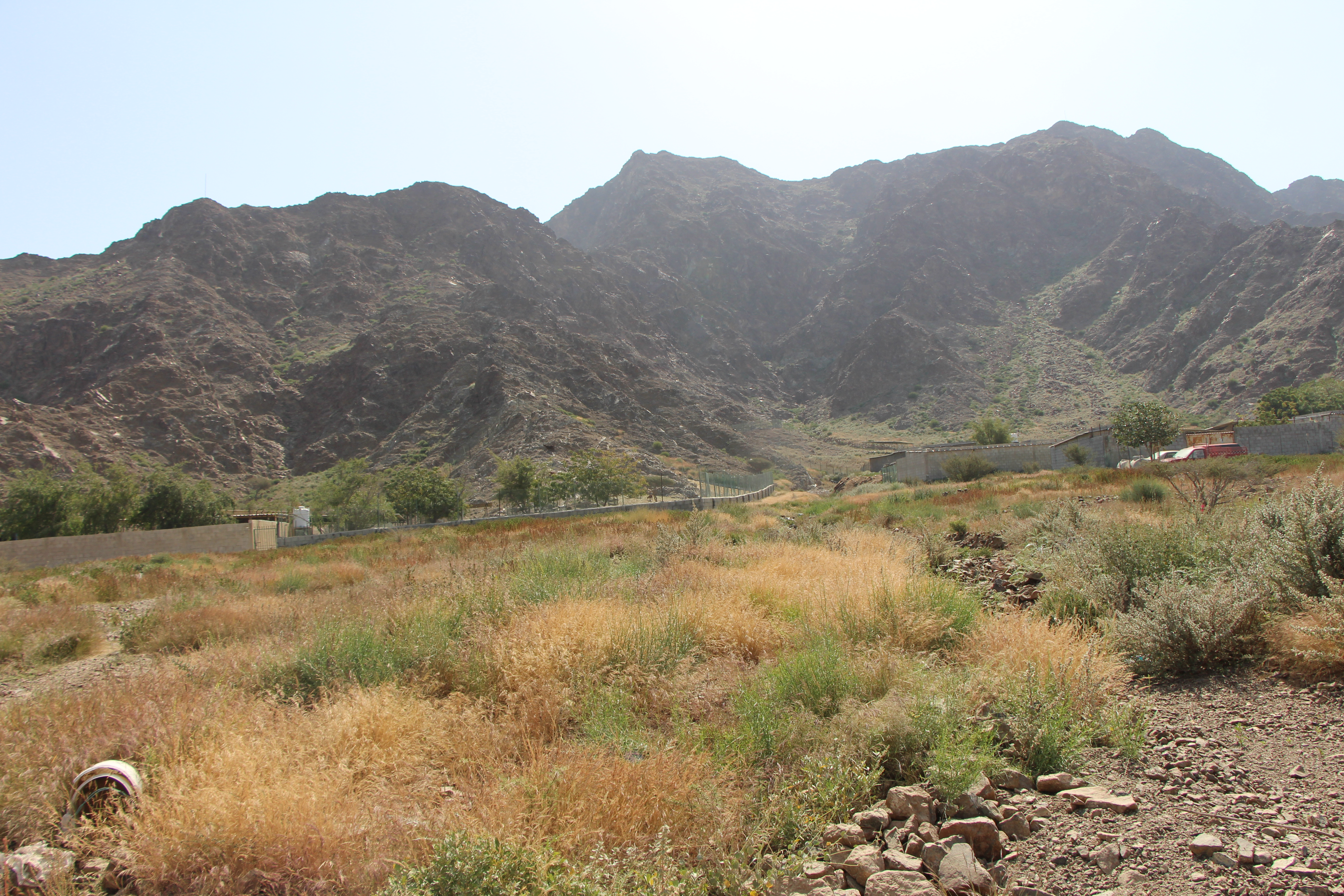
Dibba Al Fujairah Nature

Dibba Al-Fujairah has a number of suburbs and smaller neighborhoods, including Akamiya, Al-Rashidiya, Wasit, Al-Ghurfah, Sumbraid, Rul Dadna, Al-'Aqqah, Suwayfah, and Sharm. Akamiya features a health centre, capable of serving 2,000 patients, which opened in 2011 following delays caused by staff shortages.

== See also ==
- E 99 road (United Arab Emirates)
