= Abdalla Al Refaey =

Egyptian footballer (born 1995)

Personal information
- Full name: Abdalla Ismail Mohamed Al Refaey
- Date of birth: 19 November 1995 (age 30)
- Place of birth: Egypt
- Height: 1.82 m (6 ft 0 in)
- Position: Defender

Team information
- Current team: Khor Fakkan
- Number: 74

Senior career*
Years	Team	Apps	(Gls)
2018–2023	Al Wahda	17	(0)
2018–2019	→ Al Dhafra (loan)	20	(2)
2021–2022	→ Khor Fakkan (loan)	30	(3)
2023	→ Al Dhafra (loan)	7	(0)
2023–2024	Al Bataeh	11	(0)
2024–	Khor Fakkan	1	(0)
- * Club domestic league appearances and goals as of 14 March 2020

Abdalla Al Refaey (born 19 November 1995) is an Egyptian professional footballer who plays as a defender for Emirati club Khor Fakkan.

== Career ==
Al Refaey signed his first professional contract with Al Wahda on 18 August 2018. On 13 September, he left Al-Wahda and signed with Al Dhafra on a season-long loan.

== Career statistics ==
As of 14 March 2020

Club	Season	League			National Cup		League Cup (Note: All appearances in the UAE League Cup)		Continental		Other		Total	
Club	Season	Division	Apps	Goals	Apps	Goals	Apps	Goals	Apps	Goals	Apps	Goals	Apps	Goals
Al Wahda	2018–19	UAE Pro League	0	0	0	0	0	0	0	0	0	0	0	0
Al Wahda	2019–20	UAE Pro League	15	0	0	0	6	0	0	0	—		21	0
Al Wahda	Total		15	0	0	0	6	0	0	0	0	0	21	0
Al Dhafra (loan)	2018–19	UAE Pro League	20	2	0	0	5	0	—		—		25	2
Career total			35	2	0	0	11	0	0	0	0	0	46	2
