= E 99 road (United Arab Emirates) =

The E99 is a UAE road starting from UAE/OMAN border through the Hajar mountain range on the eastern coast connecting the two cities of Dibba Al-Fujairah and Khor Fakkan, The road connects to other major routes like the Sheikh Khalifa bin Zayed Road (E84) and the recently inaugurated Khorfakkan West Ring Road, E 102 (Sharjah-Maliha Road), enhancing connectivity between the UAE's interior and its eastern seaboard
