= Mirbah =

- Location within United Arab Emirates
- Coordinates: 25°16′50″N 56°21′51″E
- Country: United Arab Emirates
- Emirate: Fujairah

Mirbah, formerly Murbah, is a coastal settlement in the emirate of Fujairah, United Arab Emirates (UAE).
