= Masfout Club Stadium =

Football stadium in the United Arab Emirates

Coordinates: 24.8337286806°N 56.059356911°E

- Interactive map of Masfout Club Stadium
- Location: Masfout, United Arab Emirates
- Owner: Masfout Cultural & Sports Club
- Operator: Masfout Cultural & Sports Club
- Capacity: 3,000
- Surface: Grass

The Masfout Club Stadium is an association football stadium in Masfout, United Arab Emirates, with a capacity of 3,000. It's primarily used by Masfout CSC.
