= Ras Al Khaimah Club =

Emirati football club

Ras Al Khaimah نادي رأس الخيمة
- Full name: Ras Al Khaimah Club
- Founded: 1965
- Ground: Khalifa bin Zayed Stadium; Al Arabia; Ras Al Khaimah
- Capacity: 8,500
- Chairman: Abdulrahim Al Shaheen
- League: UAE Division One
Home colours	Away colours

Ras Al Khaimah Club was an Emirati club based in Al Nakheel, Ras Al Khaimah. They played their home games at the Khalifa bin Zayed Stadium.

== Honours ==
- UAE Division One
  - Champions (1): 1986–87

== See also ==
- List of football clubs in the United Arab Emirates
