= Kalba FC =

Emirati professional football club

Kalba نادي كلباء
- Full name: Kalba Football Club
- Nickname: The Tigers
- Founded: 1972; 54 years ago
- Ground: Ittihad Kalba Stadium
- Capacity: 7,701
- Chairman: Mohammed Obaid Al Yamahi
- Head coach: Víctor Sánchez
- League: UAE Pro League
- 2025–26: UAE Pro-League, 11th of 14
- Website: kalbafc.ae
Home colours	Away colours	Third colours

Kalba Football Club (Arabic: نادي كلباء الرياضي الثقافي), more colloquially abbreviated as Al-Ittihad, is a professional football club founded in 1972 and based in the city of Kalba, in the Emirate of Sharjah in the United Arab Emirates (UAE). The team competes in the UAE Pro League, the top tier of Emirati football.

== History ==
Kalba Football Club was established in 1972 through the merger of three clubs: Al Shabab, Al Rooba and Al Riyadiya.

Kalba has won a record breaking 7 Division 1 titles with their last one being in the 2013–14 season.

From 2009 to 2018 the team spent these years jumping up and down between divisions; since the 2018–19 season they have managed to consistently compete in the top tier, and in the 2020–21 season they reached the UAE League Cup semi-finals, where they were eliminated by Al-Nasr Dubai on penalties after a draw on aggregate.

== League record ==
Season	Position	Number of teams	Tier	President's Cup	League Cup
2008–09	5th	16	2	Round of 16	—
2009–10	1st	8	2	Round of 16	—
2010–11	11th	12	1	Preliminary Round	First Round
2011–12	1st	8	2	Quarter-Finals	—
2012–13	14th	14	1	Round of 16	First Round
2013–14	1st	13	2	Preliminary Round	—
2014–15	14th	14	1	Round of 16	First Round
2015–16	2nd	9	2	Round of 16	—
2016–17	13th	14	1	Round of 16	First Round
2017–18	2nd	12	2	Round of 16	—
2018–19	11th	14	1	Round of 16	First Round
2019–20^{a}	11th	14	1	Quarter-Finals	First Round
2020–21	8th	14	1	Round of 16	Semi-Finals
2021–22	11th	14	1	Quarter-Finals	First Round
2022–23	8th	14	1	Round of 16	First Round
2023–24	11th	14	1		
2024–25	9th	14	1		

_{Notes 2019–20 UAE football season was cancelled due to the COVID-19 pandemic in the United Arab Emirates.}

== Players ==
=== Current squad ===
As of UAE Pro-League:

Note: Flags indicate national team as defined under FIFA eligibility rules; some limited exceptions apply. Players may hold more than one non-FIFA nationality.

No.	Pos.	Nation	Player
3	MF	IRI	Amir Hossein Samdaliri
4	DF	BRA	Michel Dreifke
5	MF	UAE	Ali Salmeen
6	MF	ALB	Rejan Alivoda
7	MF	IRI	Saman Ghoddos
8	MF	BRA	Caio Eduardo
9	MF	BRA	Guilherme Biro (on loan from Al-Sharjah)
10	MF	IRI	Ahmad Nourollahi (captain)
12	DF	UAE	Salem Rashid
15	DF	UAE	Abdulaziz Al-Hamhami
17	GK	UAE	Saif Al-Zaabi
20	MF	BRA	Saile Souza
22	DF	GER	Koray Günter
23	DF	UAE	Waleed Rashid
24	MF	UAE	Khalid Al-Darmaki
25	DF	UAE	Abdusalam Mohammed
27	FW	UAE	Yaser Al-Blooshi

No.	Pos.	Nation	Player
33	GK	UAE	Sultan Al-Mantheri
34	DF	UAE	Yousif Al-Mheiri
37	MF	CIV	Kouadjo Koffi
41	MF	BRA	Neto
42	MF	PLE	Ahmed Abunamous
49	MF	BRA	Yan Phillipe
55	GK	UAE	Hamad Al-Mansoori
72	DF	UAE	Ahmed Malallah
77	FW	BRA	Adyson (on loan from Shabab Al Ahli)
80	FW	SRB	Nemanja Jović
94	FW	BRA	Juninho
96	DF	UAE	Marwan Fahad
99	FW	BRA	Carlos Alberto (on loan from Sport Recife)
—	DF	FRA	Ibrahim Cissé
—	DF	EGY	Abdalla Al Refaey
—	DF	ESP	Alejandro Vergaz

=== Out on loan ===
Note: Flags indicate national team as defined under FIFA eligibility rules; some limited exceptions apply. Players may hold more than one non-FIFA nationality.

No.	Pos.	Nation	Player
1	GK	UAE	Eisa Hooti (on loan to Al Dhafra)

Players with Multiple Nationalities

- (United Arab Emirates) (Brazil) Juninho
- (United Arab Emirates) (Brazil) Saile Souza

== Honors ==
- UAE Division One
  - Champions (7): 1979–80, 1988–89, 1995–96, 1998–99, 2009–10, 2011–12, 2013–14

== Club staff ==
Position	Name
Head coach	(Serbia) Vuk Rašović
Assistant coaches	(Italy) Gabriele Pin
Assistant coaches	(United Arab Emirates) Saeed Fawaz
Assistant coaches	(United Arab Emirates) Musa Abdulbassit
Youth coach	(Croatia) Ervin Boban
Fitness coach	(Croatia) Vladan Popović
Physiotherapist	(India) Sultan Basheer

== See also ==
- List of football clubs in the United Arab Emirates
