= Masfout Club =

Emirati football club

Masfout CSC
- Full name: Masfout Cultural & Sports Club
- Nickname: The Snipers (القناصة)
- Founded: 1995
- Ground: Masfut Club Stadium
- Capacity: 3,000
- Manager: Slavko Matić
- League: UAE Division One
Home colours	Away colours

Masfout Cultural & Sports Club, commonly known as Masfout Club, is a professional football club from Masfut, an exclave of the Emirate of Ajman, United Arab Emirates. The club plays in the UAE Division One.

== History ==
Masfout joined the UAE Division One in the 2012/13 season. Established in 1995, the club is nicknamed “The Snipers” (القناصة). They play their home matches at the Masfout Club Stadium, which has a capacity of 3,000 spectators. Masfout Club competes in the UAE Division One, having joined the league in the 2012–13 season. In the 2022–23 season, they achieved a 4th-place finish under the management of Slavko Matić. The club continues to be a significant presence in Emirati football, contributing to the sports culture of the Masfout region.

== Current squad ==
As of UAE Second Division League:

Note: Flags indicate national team as defined under FIFA eligibility rules; some limited exceptions apply. Players may hold more than one non-FIFA nationality.

No.	Pos.	Nation	Player
1	GK	UAE	Mansoor Ghloum
5	DF	BRA	Luan Martins
7	MF	BRA	Luis Fabiano
8	DF	UAE	Badr Bilal
9	FW	BRA	Raphael Lopes
18	FW	GAM	Malang Faye
20	MF	CIV	Seydou Fane
26	DF	UAE	Rashed Salem
32	DF	UAE	Ahmed Al-Hammadi
33	DF	UAE	Ahmed Salah

No.	Pos.	Nation	Player
37	MF	OMA	Mohammed Al-Matroushi
39	DF	SEN	Jean Mbengue
44	DF	SEN	Ibrahima Badji
46	DF	CMR	Robin Mboya
70	MF	UAE	Ahmed Kuderbi
81	MF	UAE	Rashed Al-Kendi
87	MF	UAE	Jassem Al-Naqbi
92	MF	SEN	Ndiaw Diop
99	MF	MAR	Fares Nael
—	GK	PAK	Asif Ullah Khan

== See also ==
- List of football clubs in the United Arab Emirates
