= Al Dhaid SC =

Emirati asscoication football club

Al Dhaid
- Full name: Al Dhaid Cultural Sports Club
- Founded: 1980; 46 years ago
- Ground: Al-Dhaid Stadium
- Capacity: 500
- Chairman: (United Arab Emirates) Saeed Obaid Al-Taniji
- Manager: (Algeria) Fouad Boumdal
- League: UAE Division One
- 2025–26: 6th
| Home colours | Away colours |

Al Dhaid (Arabic: نادي الذيد الثقافي الرياضي) is a United Arab Emirates professional football (soccer) club. It is based in Dhaid, on the outskirts of the Emirate of Sharjah. The club plays in the UAE First Division League. Their colors are white and purple.

== History ==
Al Dhaid Cultural Sports Club was founded in 1980 in Al Dhaid, Sharjah, United Arab Emirates. The club was established to represent the Central Region of the Emirate of Sharjah and became one of the country's multi-sports institutions. Since its foundation, Al Dhaid has mainly competed in the UAE First Division League and has regularly participated in the UAE President's Cup.

Throughout its history, the club has maintained a strong emphasis on youth development and community engagement. Although Al Dhaid has never competed in the UAE Pro League, the club has established itself as one of the leading clubs in the second tier of Emirati football.

During the 2020s, Al Dhaid strengthened its sporting structure and expanded its recruitment policy by signing players from Africa, Europe and South America, aiming to challenge for promotion to the UAE Pro League.

== Stadium ==
=== Al Dhaid Stadium ===
Al Dhaid Stadium is located in Al Dhaid, Sharjah, and serves as the home ground of Al Dhaid SC. The venue hosts first-team matches, youth competitions and training sessions. It is one of the principal sporting facilities in the Central Region of Sharjah.

== Colours and crest ==
The club's traditional colours are purple and white. The crest reflects the heritage and identity of Al Dhaid and the Emirate of Sharjah.

== Supporters ==
Al Dhaid enjoys support from residents of Al Dhaid and the Central Region of Sharjah. The club maintains close ties with the local community and regularly participates in sporting and cultural initiatives.

== Current squad ==
As of UAE First Division League:

Note: Flags indicate national team as defined under FIFA eligibility rules; some limited exceptions apply. Players may hold more than one non-FIFA nationality.

| No. | Pos. | Nation | Player |
|---|---|---|---|
| 1 | GK | UAE | Ibrahim Al-Kaebi |
| 2 | DF | UAE | Abdullah Al-Ameri |
| 4 | DF | UAE | Ali Moustafa |
| 5 | MF | GHA | Basiru Alhassan |
| 6 | DF | BRA | Roger Mendonça |
| 7 | FW | OMA | Faris Al-Jabri |
| 8 | MF | UAE | Khalid Al-Shaibani |
| 9 | FW | MAR | Adnane El Ouardy |
| 12 | GK | UAE | Ali Al-Qallaf |
| 14 | DF | UAE | Ahmed Sulaiman |
| 16 | MF | UAE | Hamdan Al-Obaideli |
| 17 | DF | UAE | Sabeel Ghazi |
| 21 | MF | MAR | Ayman Bouali |
| 22 | MF | UAE | Lahej Al-Nofali |
| 23 | MF | UAE | Khalifa Al-Qaidi |
| 24 | DF | UAE | Abdulrahim Ahli |

| No. | Pos. | Nation | Player |
|---|---|---|---|
| 47 | FW | UAE | Ali Eid |
| 88 | MF | IRI | Seyed Pouriya |
| 92 | MF | UAE | Khalifa Abdullah |
| 95 | GK | UAE | Bilal Chabbadi |
| 99 | FW | BRA | Jhonnata Lima |
| — | GK | UAE | Mohamed Juma |
| — | DF | MAR | Salaheddine Bahi |
| — | DF | UAE | Nashid Abdul Qadir |
| — | MF | TTO | Duane Muckette |
| — | MF | EGY | Ali Ramadhan |
| — | MF | UAE | Mohammed Obaid |
| — | MF | GIB | Ayoub El Hmidi |
| — | MF | MAR | Issam Shaitit |
| — | MF | NGR | Muiz Olawale |
| — | FW | BRA | Gregory Rocha |
| — | FW | UAE | Ebrahim Al-Mesmari |

== Board of Directors ==
| Position | Name |
|---|---|
| Chairman | Saeed Obaid Al-Tunaiji |
| Vice Chairman | Saif bin Dalwan Al Ketbi |
| Board Members | — |

=== Technical staff ===
| Position | Name |
|---|---|
| Head coach | Fouad Boumdal |
| Assistant coach | - |
| Goalkeeping coach | — |
| Fitness coach | — |
| Team manager | Mohamed Al Teneiji |

== Season-by-season record ==
| Season | Division | Position |
|---|---|---|
| 2021–22 | UAE First Division League | 14th |
| 2022–23 | UAE First Division League | 12th |
| 2023–24 | UAE First Division League | 7th |
| 2024–25 | UAE First Division League | 5th |
| 2025–26 | UAE First Division League | 6th |

== Sports sections ==
Besides football, Al Dhaid Cultural Sports Club also maintains departments in:

- Basketball
- Volleyball
- Handball
- Athletics

The club also supports cultural and community activities throughout the Emirate of Sharjah.

== See also ==
- List of football clubs in the United Arab Emirates
- UAE First Division League
