= Dibba Al-Hisn SC =

Sports club in the United Arab Emirates

Dibba Al-Hisn Sports Club نادي دبا الحصن الرياضي
- Full name: Dibba Al-Hisn Sports & Culture Club
- Nickname: Hasnawy
- Founded: 1980; 46 years ago
- Ground: Dibba Stadium, Dibba Al-Hisn
- Capacity: 700
- Owner: Khalid bin Saqr bin Mohammed Al Qasimi
- Chairman: Ibrahim Baghdad Al Darmaki
- Head coach: Hassan Al-Abdooli
- League: UAE Pro League
- 2023–24: 2nd
- Website: dhclub.ae
Home colours	Away colours

Dibba Al-Hisn Sports Club is a sports club located in the city of Dibba Al-Hisn in the United Arab Emirates. The club was established in 1980. Its football section currently competes in the UAE First Division League.

== History ==
The first team to be founded in Dibba Al-Hisn was Al-Fajr club in 1967 while Al-Dhafir club was founded during a training session in Kuwait. Around 1974, the two clubs agreed to merge as Al Hisn club in 1974. In 1980, the team officially registered with the UAE football league under the name of Dibba Al Hisn Sports Club. The team has mostly spent their time in UAE's 2nd-tier football, only getting promoted once in 2005. The 2005–06 season remains the only time the club experienced top-flight football.

== Current squad ==
As of UAE First Division League:

Note: Flags indicate national team as defined under FIFA eligibility rules; some limited exceptions apply. Players may hold more than one non-FIFA nationality.

No.	Pos.	Nation	Player
1	GK	UAE	Abdulla Al-Qamish
2	MF	UAE	Mansoor Al-Baloushi
4	DF	UAE	Ahmed Al-Affad
5	MF	UAE	Nahyan Saeed
7	MF	BRA	João Vitor
8	MF	UAE	Ahmed Al-Dhahouri
11	MF	UAE	Ahmed Al-Mutawa
12	GK	UAE	Ahmed Mahmoud
13	DF	UAE	Ahmed Al-Marzouqi
18	DF	UAE	Abdullah Khasif
19	MF	UAE	Abdullah Al-Mutawa
28	DF	UAE	Ahmed Al-Zahmi
43	DF	BRA	Guilherme Matos
45	MF	SEN	Alioune Ndour
81	DF	UAE	Mohammed Jassem

No.	Pos.	Nation	Player
84	DF	UAE	Abdullah Al-Matroushi
96	GK	UAE	Khalifa Al-Mahmoudi
—	GK	UAE	Mayed Salah
—	DF	MAR	Zouhair Marour
—	DF	UAE	Abdullah Khamis
—	DF	SDN	Yousef Abshar
—	MF	EGY	Amr Reda
—	MF	SYR	Mohammad Al Hallaq
—	MF	UAE	Ahmed Nabil
—	MF	SWE	Wilhelm Loeper
—	MF	ESP	Álex Fernández
—	MF	EGY	Anas Osama (on loan from Al-Wahda)
—	MF	UAE	Saoud Abdulrazaq
—	FW	POL	Maik Łukowicz

Players with Multiple Nationalities

- (United Arab Emirates) (Oman) Abdullah Khamis

== Coaching staff ==
Position	Name
Head coach	(United Arab Emirates) Hassan Al-Abdooli
Assistant Coach	(United Arab Emirates) Mohammed Qasim (United Arab Emirates) Omar Ali Omar (United Arab Emirates) Osama Al Haddadi (United Arab Emirates) Saud Rashid
Goalkeeper Coach	(United Arab Emirates) Ghulam Kader (United Arab Emirates) Abdullah Ali Al Marzouqi
Fitness Coach	(United Arab Emirates) Mohammed Abdulhussain

== Season-by-season record ==
Season	Lvl.	Tms.	Pos.	President's Cup	League Cup
2008–09	2	16	8th	Round of 16	—
2009–10	2	8	8th	Preliminary Round	—
2010–11	3	10	6th	Preliminary Round	—
2011–12	3	8	3rd	Round of 16	—
2012–13	2	14	5th	Preliminary Round	—
2013–14	2	13	6th	Preliminary Round	—
2014–15	2	11	7th	Preliminary Round	—
2015–16	2	9	6th	Preliminary Round	—
2016–17	2	12	5th	Preliminary Round	—
2017–18	2	12	9th	Preliminary Round	—
2018–19	2	10	5th	Round of 16	—
2019–20^{a}	2	11	2nd	Round of 16	—
2020–21	2	11	5th	Preliminary Round	—
2021–22	2	15	3rd	Preliminary Round	—
2022–23	2	17	3rd	Preliminary Round	—
2023–24	2	17	2nd	—	
2024–25	1	14			

_{Notes 2019–20 UAE football season was cancelled due to the COVID-19 pandemic in the United Arab Emirates.}

== See also ==
- List of football clubs in the United Arab Emirates
