= Al Hamriyah Club =

Emirati football club

Al Hamriyah SC
- Full name: Al Hamriyah Sports Club
- Nickname: The Sharks
- Founded: 1984; 42 years ago
- Ground: Al Hamriya Sports Club Stadium
- Capacity: 5,000
- Chairman: Jumaa Al Shamsi
- Manager: Mohamed Al Jalboot
- League: UAE Division One
- 2022–23: 5th
Home colours	Away colours

Al Hamriyah Sports Club is a professional football club based in Al Hamriyah, Sharjah, United Arab Emirates. They play in the UAE Division One.

== History ==
Al Hamriyah joined the UAE Division One in the 2008–09 season.

Old club crest

== Current squad ==
As of UAE First Division League:

Note: Flags indicate national team as defined under FIFA eligibility rules; some limited exceptions apply. Players may hold more than one non-FIFA nationality.

No.	Pos.	Nation	Player
1	GK	IRQ	Abdullah Qahtan
3	DF	UAE	Abdulaziz Al-Kaabi
4	DF	UAE	Abdalla Faisal
6	MF	BRA	Italo
16	DF	UAE	Mohamed Jalal
23	DF	UAE	Saeed Suwaidan
26	DF	UAE	Ibrahim Al-Hammadi
29	DF	UAE	Obaid Al-Dahmani
55	GK	UAE	Majed Naser
90	FW	BRA	Diogo Acosta
—	GK	UAE	Ali Safar
—	DF	VEN	Adrián Martínez
—	DF	UAE	Saud Tariq
—	DF	UAE	Amer Khalifa

No.	Pos.	Nation	Player
—	DF	UAE	Yousif Kazim
—	DF	UAE	Abdalla Abdulrahman
—	DF	UAE	Mohammed Sabeel
—	MF	ALG	Mohamed Bekhouche
—	MF	UAE	Abdullah Al-Naqbi
—	MF	UAE	Manea Ayedh
—	MF	GUI	Abdoulaye Conde
—	MF	UAE	Obaid Al-Mehri
—	MF	COD	Fred Dembi
—	MF	UAE	Sultan Al-Shamsi
—	FW	UAE	Mohammed Essa
—	FW	UAE	Ahmed Al-Naqbi
—	FW	ESP	Youssef Ezzejjari
—	FW	BEL	Mohamed Soumaré

== See also ==
- List of football clubs in the United Arab Emirates
