= List of Emirati football transfers summer 2016 =

This is a list of Emirati football transfers for the 2016 summer transfer window by club. Only transfers of clubs in the Arabian Gulf League are included.

Players without a club may join one at any time, either during or in between transfer windows.

== Arabian Gulf League ==
=== Al Ahli ===
In: Note: Flags indicate national team as defined under FIFA eligibility rules; some limited exceptions apply. Players may hold more than one non-FIFA nationality.

No.	Pos.	Nation	Player
—	DF	UAE	Mohammed Jaber (From Baniyas - 4 years)
—	FW	GHA	Asamoah Gyan (From Shanghai SIPG - 1 year loan)

Out: Note: Flags indicate national team as defined under FIFA eligibility rules; some limited exceptions apply. Players may hold more than one non-FIFA nationality.

No.	Pos.	Nation	Player
—	GK	UAE	Ahmed 'Dida' (To Baniyas - 4 years)
—	MF	UAE	Humaid Abdulla Abbas (To Al-Wasl - 3 years)
—	MF	UAE	Hamad Mohammed Al-Balooshi (To Al-Wasl)
—	FW	SEN	Moussa Sow (To Fenerbahce - 1 year loan)

=== Al Ain ===
In: Note: Flags indicate national team as defined under FIFA eligibility rules; some limited exceptions apply. Players may hold more than one non-FIFA nationality.

No.	Pos.	Nation	Player
—	MF	UAE	Amer Abdulrahman (From Baniyas - 3 years)
—	FW	BRA	Caio Lucas Fernandes (From Kashima Antlers (Japan) )
—	MF	UAE	Ibrahim Diaky (Contract Renewal - 1 year)

Out: Note: Flags indicate national team as defined under FIFA eligibility rules; some limited exceptions apply. Players may hold more than one non-FIFA nationality.

No.	Pos.	Nation	Player
—	MF	BRA	Fellipe Bastos (To Baniyas)
—	MF	UAE	Yasser Matar (To Fujairah)

=== Al Dhafra ===
In: Note: Flags indicate national team as defined under FIFA eligibility rules; some limited exceptions apply. Players may hold more than one non-FIFA nationality.

No.	Pos.	Nation	Player
—	FW	SEN	Makhete Diop (Contract Renewal)
—	MF	MAR	Adil Hermach (Contract Renewal)
—	FW	SYR	Omar Khribin (Contract Renewal)
—	DF	TUN	Issam El Adoua (Contract Renewal)
—	FW	UAE	Sanad Ali (From Dibba - 2 years)
—	DF	UAE	Mohammad Ali Al-Maeeni (From Dibba - 3 years)
—	DF	UAE	Omar Ali (From Fujairah)
—	DF	UAE	Ibrahim Al-Alawi (From Fujairah - 5 years)

Out: Note: Flags indicate national team as defined under FIFA eligibility rules; some limited exceptions apply. Players may hold more than one non-FIFA nationality.

No.	Pos.	Nation	Player
—	DF	UAE	Omair Al-Hosani (To Dibba)
—	MF	UAE	Salim Saeed (To Emirates - 1 year)

=== Al Jazira ===
In: Note: Flags indicate national team as defined under FIFA eligibility rules; some limited exceptions apply. Players may hold more than one non-FIFA nationality.

No.	Pos.	Nation	Player
—	MF	UAE	Salem Abdullah (From Al-Wasl)
—	MF	UAE	Humaid Ahmed (From Fujairah - 3 years)
—	MF	MAR	Mbark Boussoufa (From Lokomotiv Moscow - 2 years)

Out: Note: Flags indicate national team as defined under FIFA eligibility rules; some limited exceptions apply. Players may hold more than one non-FIFA nationality.

No.	Pos.	Nation	Player
—	GK	UAE	Sultan Al-Montheri (To Al-Wasl - 5 years)
—	DF	UAE	Abdulla Naser (To Dibba - 1 year loan)
—	MF	UAE	Humaid Robayya Al-Mas (To Dibba)
—	GK	UAE	Saif Al-Badi (To Hatta - 1 year loan)
—	DF	UAE	Khalid Sabil (To Al-Wasl)

=== Al Nasr ===
In: Note: Flags indicate national team as defined under FIFA eligibility rules; some limited exceptions apply. Players may hold more than one non-FIFA nationality.

No.	Pos.	Nation	Player
—	MF	MAR	Abdelaziz Barrada (From OM)
—	FW	BRA	Wanderley (From Sharjah)
—	DF	UAE	Hussain Abbas (Contract Renewal - 4 years)
—	MF	UAE	Fawaz Awana (From Baniyas - 2 years)
—	DF	UAE	Mubarak Saeed (From Emirates - 4 years)

Out: Note: Flags indicate national team as defined under FIFA eligibility rules; some limited exceptions apply. Players may hold more than one non-FIFA nationality.

No.	Pos.	Nation	Player
—	MF	UAE	Rashed Jalal (To Hatta - 1 year loan)
—	MF	UAE	Sabil Ghazi (To Emirates - 1 year loan)
—	MF	UAE	Ibrahim Essa (To Kalba - 1 year loan)
—	MF	UAE	Jamal Ibrahim (To Sharjah - 3 years)
—	DF	UAE	Ali Al-Amri (To Baniyas)
—	FW	UAE	Younis Ahmed (To Hatta - loan)

=== Al Shabab ===
In: Note: Flags indicate national team as defined under FIFA eligibility rules; some limited exceptions apply. Players may hold more than one non-FIFA nationality.

No.	Pos.	Nation	Player
—	FW	NED	Ruud Boymans (From FC Utrecht)
—	MF	UAE	Nasser Masoud (Contract Renewal - 2 years)
—	GK	UAE	Hassan Hamza (Contract Renewal - 4 years)
—	MF	ARG	Tomas De Vincenti (From APOEL)

Out: Note: Flags indicate national team as defined under FIFA eligibility rules; some limited exceptions apply. Players may hold more than one non-FIFA nationality.

No.	Pos.	Nation	Player
—	DF	UAE	Abdulrahman Ali Hassan Al-Mehri (To Al-Wasl)
—	DF	UAE	Ibrahim Abdulla (To Dibba - 1 year)
—	FW	UAE	Essa Obaid (To Hatta)
—	MF	CHI	Carlos Villanueva (To Al-Ittihad)
—	FW	BRA	Juninho Potiguar (Released)

=== Al Wahda ===
In: Note: Flags indicate national team as defined under FIFA eligibility rules; some limited exceptions apply. Players may hold more than one non-FIFA nationality.

No.	Pos.	Nation	Player
—	DF	UAE	Hamdan Al-Kamali (Contract Renewal - 5 years)
—	MF	UAE	Nasser Abdulhadi (From Dibba)
—	MF	UAE	Tareq Al-Khaddeim (From Dibba)
—	MF	HUN	Balázs Dzsudzsák (From Bursaspor - 2 years)

Out: Note: Flags indicate national team as defined under FIFA eligibility rules; some limited exceptions apply. Players may hold more than one non-FIFA nationality.

No.	Pos.	Nation	Player
—	MF	UAE	Amer Omar (To Baniyas)
—	MF	UAE	Youssef Mohammad Hzam (To Baniyas - 3 years)
—	MF	UAE	Omar Al-Rashidi (To Baniyas)
—	MF	UAE	Abdulla Al-Noubi (To Baniyas)
—	MF	UAE	Mayed Al-Mesmari (To Dibba)
—	MF	UAE	Fahad Al-Dhanhani (To Dibba)
—	MF	UAE	Mohammad Salam (Released)
—	MF	BRA	Denilson (To Cruzeiro - 1 year loan)

=== Al Wasl ===
In: Note: Flags indicate national team as defined under FIFA eligibility rules; some limited exceptions apply. Players may hold more than one non-FIFA nationality.

No.	Pos.	Nation	Player
—	MF	UAE	Humaid Abdulla Abbas (From Al-Ahli - 3 years)
—	MF	UAE	Hamad Mohammad Al-Balooshi (From Al-Ahli)
—	DF	UAE	Khalid Sabil (From Al-Jazira)
—	GK	UAE	Sultan Al-Montheri (From Al-Jazira - 5 years)
—	FW	UAE	Rashed Al-Hajeri (From Al-Shaab - 3 years)
—	DF	UAE	Abdulrahman Ali Hassan Al-Mehri (From Al-Shabab)
—	DF	UAE	Youssef Al-Mallahi (From Al Urooba)
—	DF	UAE	Ali Ismail (From Al Urooba)
—	MF	UAE	Ali Salmin (Contract Renewal - 5 years)
—	GK	UAE	Humaid Abdulla (From Dibba)
—	FW	UAE	Khalil Khamis (From Fujairah - 4 years)
—	MF	BRA	Ronaldo Mendes (From Comercial Futebol Clube (AL) - 5 years)
—	MF	POR	Helder Barbosa (From AEK Athens - 2 years)

Out: Note: Flags indicate national team as defined under FIFA eligibility rules; some limited exceptions apply. Players may hold more than one non-FIFA nationality.

No.	Pos.	Nation	Player
—	MF	UAE	Salem Abdullah (To Al-Jazira)
—	DF	UAE	Mubarak Al-Mansouri (To Baniyas)
—	MF	UAE	Mohamed Jamal (To Hatta)
—	MF	POR	Hugo Viana (Released)

=== Baniyas ===
In: Note: Flags indicate national team as defined under FIFA eligibility rules; some limited exceptions apply. Players may hold more than one non-FIFA nationality.

No.	Pos.	Nation	Player
—	GK	UAE	Ahmed 'Dida' (From Al-Ahli - 4 years)
—	MF	BRA	Fellipe Bastos (From Al-Ain - 1 year loan)
—	MF	UAE	Amer Omar (From Al-Wahda - 4 years)
—	MF	UAE	Omar Al-Rashidi (From Al-Wahda - 3 years)
—	DF	UAE	Abdulla Al-Noubi (From Al-Wahda)
—	MF	UAE	Youssef Mohammad Hzam (From Al-Wahda)
—	DF	UAE	Mubarak Al-Mansouri (From Al-Wahda - 2 years)
—	MF	UAE	Faisal Al-Khaddeim (From Dibba)
—	DF	UAE	Ali Al-Amri (From Al-Nasr)

Out: Note: Flags indicate national team as defined under FIFA eligibility rules; some limited exceptions apply. Players may hold more than one non-FIFA nationality.

No.	Pos.	Nation	Player
—	DF	UAE	Mohammad Jaber (To Al-Ahli)
—	MF	UAE	Amer Abdulrahman (To Al-Ain)
—	MF	UAE	Fawaz Awana (To Al-Nasr)

=== Dibba ===
In: Note: Flags indicate national team as defined under FIFA eligibility rules; some limited exceptions apply. Players may hold more than one non-FIFA nationality.

No.	Pos.	Nation	Player
—	DF	UAE	Omair Al-Hosani (From Al-Dhafra)
—	DF	UAE	Abdulla Naser (From Al-Jazira - 1 year loan)
—	MF	UAE	Humaid Robayya Al-Mas (From Al-Jazira)
—	MF	UAE	Mohammad Al-Obad (From Al Khaleej Club - 2 years)
—	DF	KOR	Heo Jae-Won (From Al-Khor Sports Club)
—	DF	UAE	Ibrahim Abdulla (From Al-Shabab - 1 year)
—	MF	UAE	Fahad Al-Dhanhani (From Al-Wahda - 1 year loan)
—	MF	UAE	Mayed Rashed Al-Mesmari (From Al-Wahda)
—	GK	UAE	Talal Hamad Al-Mehairi (From Emirates)
—	GK	UAE	Mohammad Al-Rowaihy (From Fujairah)
—	MF	UAE	Khalifa Al-Qayedi (From Hatta)
—	MF	SUR	Nicandro Breeveld (From Steaua București)
—	FW	CIV	Hamed Kone (From FC Voluntari - 1 year (500,000 EUR))

Out: Note: Flags indicate national team as defined under FIFA eligibility rules; some limited exceptions apply. Players may hold more than one non-FIFA nationality.

No.	Pos.	Nation	Player
—	FW	UAE	Sanad Ali (To Al-Dhafra)
—	DF	UAE	Mohammad Ali Al-Maeeni (To Al-Dhafra)
—	MF	UAE	Nasser Abdulhadi (To Al-Wahda)
—	MF	UAE	Tareq Al-Khaddeim (To Al-Wahda)
—	GK	UAE	Humaid Abdulla (To Al-Wasl)
—	MF	UAE	Faisal Al-Khaddeim (To Baniyas)
—	DF	UAE	Mohammad Qassim (To Hatta)
—	MF	CIV	Ibrahima Diakite (Released)
—	DF	LBN	Bilal Najjarine (Released)
—	FW	CIV	Boris Kabi (Released)

=== Emirates ===
In: Note: Flags indicate national team as defined under FIFA eligibility rules; some limited exceptions apply. Players may hold more than one non-FIFA nationality.

No.	Pos.	Nation	Player
—	FW	UAE	Ahmad Malallah (From Ajman)
—	DF	UAE	Ali Rabih (From Ajman - 1 year)
—	MF	UAE	Salim Saeed (From Al-Dhafra)
—	MF	UAE	Sabeel Ghazi (From Al-Nasr)
—	DF	UAE	Haidar Alo Ali (Contract Renewal - 1 year)
—	FW	ARG	Sebastian Saez (From Al-Wakrah Sport Club)
—	MF	BRA	Augusto Cesar dos Santos Moreira (From Internacional)
—	MF	TUN	Hocine Ragued (From Esperance Sportive de Tunis)
—	DF	AUS	Zac Anderson (From Sydney FC)

Out: Note: Flags indicate national team as defined under FIFA eligibility rules; some limited exceptions apply. Players may hold more than one non-FIFA nationality.

No.	Pos.	Nation	Player
—	DF	UAE	Mubarak Saeed (To Al-Nasr)
—	FW	SEN	Alassane Diallo (To Al Shaab CSC)
—	MF	BRA	Rodrigo Pimpao (To Botafogo)
—	GK	UAE	Talal Hamad Al-Mehairi (To Dibba)
—	DF	UAE	Eissa Abdullah (To Kalba)
—	DF	UAE	Mahmoud Hassan (To Hatta)
—	MF	UAE	Mohammad Malallah (To Hatta)
—	MF	AUS	Brett Holman (Released)

=== Hatta ===
In: Note: Flags indicate national team as defined under FIFA eligibility rules; some limited exceptions apply. Players may hold more than one non-FIFA nationality.

No.	Pos.	Nation	Player
—	MF	JOR	Yassin Al-Bakhit (From Al-Faisaly ($300,000))
—	MF	UAE	Maher Jassim (From Al-Wasl)
—	FW	UAE	Essa Obaid (From Al-Shabab (Free))
—	MF	UAE	Mohammad Jamal (From Al-Wasl)
—	DF	UAE	Mohammad Qassim (From Dibba)
—	DF	UAE	Mahmoud Hassan (From Emirates)
—	MF	UAE	Mohammad Malalla (From Emirates - 1 year)
—		UAE	Mohammad Al-Shehhi (Contract Renewal)
—		UAE	Moussa Hatab (Contract Renewal)
—		UAE	Lahej Haboush Saleh (Contract Renewal)
—	MF	UAE	Shehab Ahmad (Contract Renewal)
—		UAE	Khamis Ahmad (Contract Renewal)
—		UAE	Ali Mahmoud (Contract Renewal)
—	GK	UAE	Saif Al-Badi (From Al-Jazira)
—	MF	UAE	Rashed Jalal (From Al-Nasr)
—	MF	ROU	Adrian Ropotan (From CS Pandurii Târgu Jiu)
—	MF	ROU	Mihai Radut (From CS Pandurii Târgu Jiu)
—	DF	UAE	Bader Abdulrahman (From Sharjah)
—	FW	BFA	Issiaka Ouedraogo (From Wolfsberger AC)

Out: Note: Flags indicate national team as defined under FIFA eligibility rules; some limited exceptions apply. Players may hold more than one non-FIFA nationality.

No.	Pos.	Nation	Player
—	MF	UAE	Khalifa Al-Qayedi (To Dibba)

=== Kalba ===
In: Note: Flags indicate national team as defined under FIFA eligibility rules; some limited exceptions apply. Players may hold more than one non-FIFA nationality.

No.	Pos.	Nation	Player
—	MF	UAE	Mohammad Al-Khaddeim (From Ajman)
—		UAE	Hamad Al-Hosani (From Ajman)
—	MF	IRQ	Salam Shaker (From Al-Fateh SC)
—	FW	UAE	Shaheen Surour (From Al-Jazira)
—	DF	BFA	Yahia Kebe (From Al Kharaitiyat SC)
—	DF	UAE	Ibrahim Eissa (From Al-Nasr)
—	DF	UAE	Eissa Abdullah (From Emirates)
—		UAE	Khaled Ali (Contract Renewal)
—	DF	UAE	Yasser Al-Jenebi (Contract Renewal)
—		UAE	Abdulla Al-Matroshi (Contract Renewal)
—		UAE	Yaqoob Hassan (Contract Renewal)
—		UAE	Ali Saeed (Contract Renewal)
—		UAE	Mayed Al-Zaabi (Contract Renewal)
—		UAE	Ghanim Basheer (Contract Renewal)
—		UAE	Hamdan Nasser Masood (Contract Renewal)
—	FW	ROU	Mehai Kosta (Contract Renewal)
—		UAE	Ahmad Amer (Contract Renewal)
—	MF	ESP	Carmelo Gonzalez Jose (From Suphanburi)

Out: Note: Flags indicate national team as defined under FIFA eligibility rules; some limited exceptions apply. Players may hold more than one non-FIFA nationality.

No.	Pos.	Nation	Player

=== Sharjah ===
In: Note: Flags indicate national team as defined under FIFA eligibility rules; some limited exceptions apply. Players may hold more than one non-FIFA nationality.

No.	Pos.	Nation	Player
—	MF	UAE	Jamal Ibrahim (From Al-Nasr - 3 years)
—	MF	UAE	Walid Ahmed (Contract Renewal)
—	MF	UAE	Saif Rashed (Contract Renewal)
—	DF	UAE	Abdulla Ghanem (Contract Renewal)
—	DF	UAE	Majid Surour (Contract Renewal)
—	DF	UAE	Fayez Juma (Contract Renewal)
—	MF	UAE	Omar Juma (Contract Renewal)
—	DF	UAE	Abdulla Ahmed (Contract Renewal)
—	MF	POL	Adrian Mierzejewski (From Al-Nassr FC)
—	DF	BRA	Digao (From Al-Hilal FC)
—	FW	VEN	Gelmin Rivas (From Ittihad FC)

Out: Note: Flags indicate national team as defined under FIFA eligibility rules; some limited exceptions apply. Players may hold more than one non-FIFA nationality.

No.	Pos.	Nation	Player
—	FW	BRA	Wanderley (To Al-Nasr)
—	DF	UAE	Bader Abdulrahman (To Hatta)
