= 2023 Arab Club Champions Cup =

2023 King Salman Club Cup

Tournament details
- Host country: Saudi Arabia (final tournament)
- Dates: Preliminary rounds: 2–5 March 2023; Qualifying rounds: 13 March – 7 July 2023; Competition proper: 27 July – 12 August 2023
- Teams: Competition proper: 16; Total: 37 (from 2 confederations) (from 22 associations)
- Venues: 4 (in 4 host cities)

Final positions
- Champions: (Saudi Arabia) Al-Nassr (1st title)
- Runners-up: (Saudi Arabia) Al-Hilal

Tournament statistics
- Matches played: 31
- Goals scored: 68 (2.19 per match)
- Top scorer: (Portugal) Cristiano Ronaldo (6 goals)
- Best player: (Serbia) Sergej Milinković-Savić
- Best goalkeeper: (Saudi Arabia) Nawaf Al-Aqidi
- (Note: Statistics do not include preliminary and qualifying rounds)

The 2023 Arab Club Champions Cup, officially named the 2023 King Salman Club Cup (Arabic: كأس الملك سلمان للأندية 2023) after Salman of Saudi Arabia, where the final tournament was hosted, was the 30th season (Note: Not including the cancelled 1990 edition.) of the Arab Club Champions Cup, the Arab world's club football tournament organised by UAFA.

A total of 37 teams participated in the tournament, which started with preliminary and qualifying rounds, before the final tournament was held in Saudi Arabia in the summer of 2023 across four cities: Abha, Al Bahah, Khamis Mushait and Taif. A total of $10 million of prize money was awarded.

Moroccan side Raja CA were the defending champions, having won their second title in the previous edition, but they lost 3–1 in the quarter-finals to Saudi team Al-Nassr. In the final, Al-Nassr defeated local rivals Al-Hilal 2–1 after extra time to win their first title.

== Prize money and sponsorship ==
The prize money was as follows:

Prize money
Winners	$6,000,000
Runners-up	$2,500,000
Semi-finalists	$200,000
Quarter-finalists	$150,000
Group stage	$100,000
Qualifying rounds	$20,000

Sponsorship of 2023 Arab Club Champions Cup:

Sponsorship
(United Arab Emirates) Fly Emirates

== Association team allocation ==
A total of 37 teams participated in the tournament.

On March 3, Egyptian club Al Ahly announced its withdrawal from the competition due to scheduling issues.

=== Association ranking ===
The team entries allocation was based on the FIFA World Ranking of the associations on 22 December 2022.

Asia Zone
Zone Rank	Association	FIFA World Ranking	Teams (19 total)		
Zone Rank	Association	FIFA World Ranking	Group stage	Qualifying round	Preliminary round
1	Saudi Arabia (host)	49	3	1	0
2	Qatar	60	1	1	0
3	Iraq	68	1	1	0
4	United Arab Emirates	70	0	1	0
5	Oman	75	0	2	0
6	Jordan	84	0	1	0
7	Bahrain	85	0	2	0
8	Syria	90	0	1	0
9	Palestine	93	0	1	0
10	Lebanon	100	0	1	0
11	Kuwait	148	0	1	0
12	Yemen	154	0	0	1

Africa Zone
Zone Rank	Association	FIFA World Ranking	Teams (18 total)		
Zone Rank	Association	FIFA World Ranking	Group stage	Qualifying round	Preliminary round
1	Morocco	11	2	1	0
2	Tunisia	30	1	2	0
3	Egypt	39	1	1	0
4	Algeria	40	1	1	0
5	Mauritania	103	0	1	0
6	Libya	120	0	2	0
7	Sudan	128	0	2	0
8	Comoros	129	0	0	1
9	Djibouti	193	0	0	1
10	Somalia	204	0	0	1

== Format and distribution ==
	Teams entering in this round	Teams advancing from previous round
Preliminary round (4 teams)	4 teams	
First qualifying round (24 teams)	23 teams	1 winner from the preliminary round
Second qualifying round (12 teams)		12 winners from the first qualifying round
Group stage (16 teams)	10 teams: Previous edition title holder; Previous edition runners-up; Algerian champions; Egyptian champions; Iraqi champions; Moroccan champions; Qatari champions; Saudi Arabian champions; Tunisian champions; Host nation team	6 winners from the second qualifying round
Knockout phase (8 teams)		4 group winners from the group stage; 4 group runners-up from the group stage

== Teams ==
The labels in the parentheses show each team's position from their last season domestic league table standing.

Entry round	Teams			
Group stage	(Morocco) Raja CA (2nd)	(Saudi Arabia) Al-Ittihad Jeddah (2nd)	(Algeria) CR Belouizdad (1st)	(Egypt) Zamalek (1st)
Group stage	(Iraq) Al-Shorta (1st)	(Morocco) Wydad AC (1st)	(Qatar) Al-Sadd (1st)	
Group stage	(Saudi Arabia) Al-Hilal (1st)	(Tunisia) Espérance de Tunis (1st)	(Saudi Arabia) Al-Nassr (3rd)	
Qualifying rounds	(Algeria) JS Saoura (3rd)	(Bahrain) Manama (2nd)	(Bahrain) Al-Muharraq (4th)	(Egypt) Tala'ea El-Gaish (4th)
Qualifying rounds	(Iraq) Al-Quwa Al-Jawiya (2nd)	(Jordan) Shabab Al-Ordon (4th)	Kuwait SC (1st)	(Lebanon) Bourj (3rd)
Qualifying rounds	(Libya) Al-Ittihad Tripoli (1st)	(Libya) Al-Ahli Tripoli (2nd)	(Mauritania) FC Nouadhibou (1st)	(Morocco) ASFAR (3rd)
Qualifying rounds	(Oman) Al-Seeb (1st)	(Oman) Al-Nahda (2nd)	(Palestine) Shabab Al-Khalil (1st)	Qatar SC (9th)
Qualifying rounds	(Saudi Arabia) Al-Shabab (4th)	(Sudan) Al-Hilal Omdurman (1st)	(Sudan) Al-Merrikh (2nd)	(Syria) Tishreen (1st)
Qualifying rounds	(Tunisia) US Monastir (2nd)	(Tunisia) CS Sfaxien (3rd)	(United Arab Emirates) Al-Wahda (3rd)	
Preliminary rounds	(Comoros) Volcan Club (1st)	(Djibouti) Arta Solar 7 (1st)	(Somalia) Horseed FC (1st)	(Yemen) Fahman (1st)

Notes

1. Title holders (TH): Raja CA were the 2019–20 Arab Club Champions Cup title holders.
2. Runners-up (RU): Al-Ittihad Jeddah were the 2019–20 Arab Club Champions Cup runners-up.
3. Host nation team (HN): Al-Nassr were the highest-placed team in the 2021–22 Saudi Pro League that had not already qualified to the group stage.

== Schedule ==
The schedule was as follows.

Stage	Round	Draw date	First leg	Second leg	Host
Preliminary rounds	First round	No draw	2 March 2023		Saudi Arabia
Preliminary rounds	Playoff round	No draw	5 March 2023		Saudi Arabia
Qualifying rounds	First round	6 March 2023	13 March – 7 April 2023	21 March – 16 April 2023	Home and away matches
Qualifying rounds	Second round	6 March 2023	8 May – 4 July 2023	11 May – 7 July 2023	Home and away matches
Group stage	Matchday 1	6 March 2023	27–28 July 2023		Saudi Arabia
Group stage	Matchday 2	6 March 2023	30–31 July 2023		Saudi Arabia
Group stage	Matchday 3	6 March 2023	2–3 August 2023		Saudi Arabia
Knockout stage	Quarter-finals	6 March 2023	5–6 August 2023		Saudi Arabia
Knockout stage	Semi-finals	6 March 2023	9 August 2023		Saudi Arabia
Knockout stage	Final	6 March 2023	12 August 2023		Saudi Arabia

== Preliminary rounds ==
Four teams played the preliminary rounds, starting with the first round and then a play-off round in a one-leg knockout format. One team from the preliminary round advanced to the qualifying rounds.

=== Preliminary rounds teams ===
The following teams entered the preliminary rounds as the lowest FIFA ranking associations.

Teams entered the preliminary rounds
  - (Comoros) Volcan Club
  - (Djibouti) Arta Solar 7
  - (Somalia) Horseed FC
  - (Yemen) Fahman

=== Bracket ===
First preliminary round
2 March – Jeddah
(Djibouti) Arta Solar 7	2
(Comoros) Volcan Club	0
2 March – Jeddah
(Yemen) Fahman	3
(Somalia) Horseed FC	0

Playoff round
5 March – Jeddah
(Djibouti) Arta Solar 7	1
(Yemen) Fahman	2

=== First preliminary round ===
2 March 2023
13:10

Arta Solar 7 (Djibouti)	2–0	(Comoros) Volcan Club
Kalou 6'; Akinbinu 86'	Report

King Abdullah Sports City, Jeddah
Referee: Khalid Marhoun Al Shaqsi (Oman)
2 March 2023
17:10

Fahman (Yemen)	3–0	(Somalia) Horseed FC
Alratil 34'; Rajeh 38'; Mahdi 90'	Report

King Abdullah Sports City, Jeddah
Referee: Yehya Al Beloushi (Oman)

=== Playoff round ===
5 March 2023
16ː00

Arta Solar 7 (Djibouti)	1–2	(Yemen) Fahman
Traoré 45'	Report	Awad 42', 76'

King Abdullah Sports City, Jeddah
Referee: Khalid Marhoun Al Shaqsi (Oman)

== Qualifying rounds ==
24 teams were drawn into two-leg knockout stage format. 23 teams entered directly to the first qualifying round, plus one team advanced from the preliminary round. 12 teams advanced to the second qualifying round playing a two-leg knockout stage format. Six teams only advanced from the second qualifying round to the group stage.

=== Seeding ===
The following 24 teams were divided based on their football association's FIFA Ranking.

Pot 1	Pot 2	Pot 3	Pot 4
(Algeria) JS Saoura; (Egypt) Tala'ea El-Gaish; (Morocco) ASFAR; (Saudi Arabia) Al-Shabab; (Tunisia) CS Sfaxien; (Tunisia) US Monastir	(Iraq) Al-Quwa Al-Jawiya; (Jordan) Shabab Al-Ordon; (Oman) Al-Nahda; (Oman) Al-Seeb; Qatar SC; (United Arab Emirates) Al-Wahda	(Bahrain) Al-Muharraq; (Bahrain) Manama; (Lebanon) Bourj; (Mauritania) FC Nouadhibou; (Palestine) Shabab Al-Khalil; (Syria) Tishreen	Kuwait SC; (Libya) Al-Ahli Tripoli; (Libya) Al-Ittihad Tripoli; (Sudan) Al-Hilal Omdurman; (Sudan) Al-Merrikh; (Yemen) Fahman

Notes

1. Preliminary (PRE): Fahman advanced to the first qualifying round via the preliminary rounds.

=== Bracket ===
Qualifier 1

First qualifying round
(Morocco) ASFAR	4	1	5
(Libya) Al-Ittihad Tripoli	1	3	4
(Lebanon) Bourj	0	0	0
(United Arab Emirates) Al-Wahda	3	1	4

Second qualifying round
(Morocco) ASFAR	0	0	0
(United Arab Emirates) Al-Wahda	0	3	3

Qualifier 2

First qualifying round
(Sudan) Al-Merrikh	2	0	2
(Syria) Tishreen (a)	1	1	2
(Iraq) Al-Quwa Al-Jawiya	1	0	1
(Saudi Arabia) Al-Shabab	1	4	5

Second qualifying round
(Syria) Tishreen	1	1	2
(Saudi Arabia) Al-Shabab	1	3	4

Qualifier 3

First qualifying round
(Sudan) Al-Hilal Omdurman	3	1	4
(Bahrain) Manama	0	2	2
(Tunisia) CS Sfaxien (a)	0	1	1
Qatar SC	0	1	1

Second qualifying round
(Sudan) Al-Hilal Omdurman	1	0	1
(Tunisia) CS Sfaxien	0	2	2

Qualifier 4

First qualifying round
(Egypt) Tala'ea El-Gaish	1	1	2
(Libya) Al-Ahli Tripoli	2	1	3
(Oman) Al-Nahda	2	3 (awd.)	5
(Palestine) Shabab Al-Khalil	0	0 (abd.)	0

Second qualifying round
(Libya) Al-Ahli Tripoli	4	0	4
(Oman) Al-Nahda	2	0	2

Qualifier 5

First qualifying round
(Yemen) Fahman	0	0	0
(Tunisia) US Monastir	4	2	6
(Bahrain) Al-Muharraq (p)	2	0	2 (5)
(Oman) Al-Seeb	0	2	2 (4)

Second qualifying round
(Tunisia) US Monastir	2	1	3
(Bahrain) Al-Muharraq	0	0	0

Qualifier 6

First qualifying round
(Mauritania) FC Nouadhibou	4	0	4
(Jordan) Shabab Al-Ordon	1	1	2
Kuwait SC	1	1	2
(Algeria) JS Saoura	0	1	1

Second qualifying round
(Mauritania) FC Nouadhibou	1	0	1
Kuwait SC	2	1	3

=== First qualifying round ===
The first legs were played between 13 March and 7 April 2023, and the second legs between 21 March and 16 April 2023.

Team 1	Agg.	Team 2	1st leg	2nd leg
ASFAR (Morocco)	5–4	(Libya) Al-Ittihad Tripoli	4–1	1–3
Bourj (Lebanon)	0–4 (Note: Both legs played in Al-Nahyan Stadium, Abu Dhabi, United Arab Emirates.)	(United Arab Emirates) Al-Wahda	0–3	0–1
Al-Merrikh (Sudan)	2–2 (a) (Note: Both legs played in Prince Abdullah Al Faisal Stadium, Jeddah, Saudi Arabia.)	(Syria) Tishreen	2–1	0–1
Al-Quwa Al-Jawiya (Iraq)	1–5 (Note: Order of legs reversed after original draw.)	(Saudi Arabia) Al-Shabab	1–1	0–4
Al-Hilal Omdurman (Sudan)	4–2	(Bahrain) Manama	3–0	1–2
CS Sfaxien (Tunisia)	1–1 (a)	Qatar SC	0–0	1–1
Tala'ea El-Gaish (Egypt)	2–3	(Libya) Al-Ahli Tripoli	1–2	1–1
Al-Nahda (Oman)	5–0	(Palestine) Shabab Al-Khalil	2–0	3–0 (awd.) (Note: Al-Nahda were awarded a 3–0 walkover victory for the second leg after Shabab Al-Khalil refused to change the home ground from Dura International Stadium, in Dura, Hebron, to Petra Stadium in Amman, Jordan.)
Fahman (Yemen)	0–6	(Tunisia) US Monastir	0–4	0–2
Al-Muharraq (Bahrain)	2–2 (5–4 p)	(Oman) Al-Seeb	2–0	0–2
FC Nouadhibou (Mauritania)	4–2	(Jordan) Shabab Al-Ordon	4–1	0–1
Kuwait SC	2–1	(Algeria) JS Saoura	1–0	1–1

Notes

15 March 2023
20:00 UTC+1

ASFAR (Morocco)	4–1	(Libya) Al-Ittihad Tripoli
Sahd 14'; Ennafati 51'; Gnadou 63'; Hamoudan 82'	Report	Eisa 77'

Prince Moulay Abdellah Stadium, Rabat
Referee: Mahmoud El Banna (Egypt)
12 April 2023
21:00 UTC+2

Al-Ittihad Tripoli (Libya)	3–1	(Morocco) ASFAR
Mihri 9', 35', 83'	Report	Sahd 43'

Benina Martyrs Stadium, Benghazi
Referee: Mehrez Melki (Tunisia)

ASFAR won 5–4 on aggregate.

4 April 2023
23:00 UTC+4

Bourj (Lebanon)	0–3	(United Arab Emirates) Al-Wahda
	Report	Zouhir 16'; Pereira 29'; Al Karbi 35'

Al-Nahyan Stadium, Abu Dhabi (United Arab Emirates)
Referee: Ahmed Al Ali (Jordan)
8 April 2023
23:00 UTC+4

Al-Wahda (United Arab Emirates)	1–0	(Lebanon) Bourj FC
Allan 90+6'	Report

Al-Nahyan Stadium, Abu Dhabi
Referee: Qasim Matar Al Hatmi (Oman)

Al-Wahda won 4–0 on aggregate.

7 April 2023
22:00 UTC+3

Al-Merrikh (Sudan)	2–1	(Syria) Tishreen
Nouh 29'; Sergio 33'	Report	Al-Mohamad 13'

Prince Abdullah Al Faisal Stadium, Jeddah (Saudi Arabia)
Referee: Omar Mohamed Al Ali (United Arab Emirates)
11 April 2023
22:00 UTC+3

Tishreen (Syria)	1–0	(Sudan) Al-Merrikh
Al-Mohamad 18'	Report

Prince Abdullah Al Faisal Stadium, Jeddah (Saudi Arabia)
Referee: Ammar Al-Jeneibi (United Arab Emirates)

2–2 on aggregate. Tishreen won on away goals.

13 March 2023
17:00 UTC+3

Al-Quwa Al-Jawiya (Iraq)	1–1	(Saudi Arabia) Al-Shabab
Nabeel 38'	Report	Boupendza 69'

Basra International Stadium, Basra
Referee: Ali Reda (Lebanon)
16 April 2023
22:00 UTC+3

Al-Shabab (Saudi Arabia)	4–0	(Iraq) Al-Quwa Al-Jawiya
Boupendza 19'; Banega 73'; Al-Tambakti 80'; Guanca 90+1'	Report

Prince Faisal bin Fahd Stadium, Riyadh
Referee: Mohamed Adel (Egypt)

Al-Shabab won 5–1 on aggregate.

13 March 2023
19:00 UTC+2

Al-Hilal Omdurman (Sudan)	3–0	(Bahrain) Manama
Ngoma 77'; Lilepo 87'; Abdelrahman 90+3'	Report

Al-Hilal Stadium, Omdurman
Referee: Lotfi Bekouassa (Algeria)
10 April 2023
20:00 UTC+3

Manama (Bahrain)	2–1	(Sudan) Al-Hilal Omdurman
Moosa 33' (pen.); Al-Khatal 37'	Report	Abagna 23'

Khalifa Sports City Stadium, Isa Town
Referee: Ahmed Al Ali (Jordan)

Al-Hilal Omdurman won 4–2 on aggregate.

3 April 2023
22:00 UTC+1

CS Sfaxien (Tunisia)	0–0	Qatar SC
	Report

Stade Taïeb Mhiri, Sfax
Referee: Abdulwahid Huraywidah (Libya)
11 April 2023
22:00 UTC+3

Qatar SC	1–1	(Tunisia) CS Sfaxien
Pastore 90'	Report	Kanté 41'

Suheim bin Hamad Stadium, Doha
Referee: Ali Sabah (Iraq)

1–1 on aggregate. CS Sfaxien won on away goals.

4 April 2023
21:00 UTC+2

Tala'ea El-Gaish (Egypt)	1–2	(Libya) Al-Ahli Tripoli
Tarek 21'	Report	El Monir 54'; Maatouk 89'

Gehaz El-Reyada Stadium, Cairo
Referee: Adham Makhadmeh (Jordan)
11 April 2023
21:00 UTC+2

Al-Ahli Tripoli (Libya)	1–1	(Egypt) Tala'ea El-Gaish
Saltou 64'	Report	Julius 20'

Benina Martyrs Stadium, Benghazi
Referee: Mahmood Ismail (Sudan)

Al-Ahli Tripoli won 3–2 on aggregate.

1 April 2023
23:00 UTC+4

Al-Nahda (Oman)	2–0	(Palestine) Shabab Al-Khalil
Camara 13'; Al-Maliki 72'	Report

Al-Buraimi Sports Complex, Al-Buraimi
Referee: Saoud Ali Al Adba (Qatar)
11 April 2023
21:30 UTC+2

Shabab Al-Khalil (Palestine)	0–3 (awarded)	(Oman) Al-Nahda
	Report

Petra Stadium, Amman (Jordan)

Al-Nahda won 5–0 on aggregate.
Al-Nahda were awarded a 3–0 walkover victory for the second leg after Shabab Al-Khalil refused to change the home ground from Dura International Stadium, in Dura, Hebron to Petra Stadium in Amman, Jordan.

5 April 2023
22:00 UTC+3

Fahman (Yemen)	0–4	(Tunisia) US Monastir
	Report	Traoré 36', 60'; Mhirsi 71', 77'

King Fahd International Stadium, Riyadh (Saudi Arabia)
Referee: Ahmad Ibrahim (Jordan)
12 April 2023
20:00 UTC+1

US Monastir (Tunisia)	2–0	(Yemen) Fahman
Aloui 52'; Jaffali 64'	Report

Stade Mustapha Ben Jannet, Monastir
Referee: Feras Taweel (Syria)

US Monastir won 6–0 on aggregate.

14 March 2023
18:30 UTC+3

Al-Muharraq (Bahrain)	2–0	(Oman) Al-Seeb
Arboleda 21'; Ogbi 44' (pen.)	Report

Sheikh Ali bin Mohammed Al-Khalifa Stadium, Muharraq
Referee: Adel Al Naqbi (United Arab Emirates)
4 April 2023
23:00 UTC+4

Al-Seeb (Oman)	2–0	(Bahrain) Al-Muharraq
Al-Muqbali 43', 79'	Report
Penalties
Al-Musalami (penalty scored); Al-Yahyaei (penalty missed); Ramadhan (penalty scored); Mubarak (penalty scored); Al-Muqbali (penalty scored)	4–5	(penalty scored) Mahrouq; (penalty scored) Al-Safi; (penalty scored) Al-Juban; (penalty scored) Al-Sherooqi; (penalty scored) Sulumba

Al-Seeb Stadium, Muscat
Referee: Mohanad Qasim Sarray (Iraq)

2–2 on aggregate. Al-Muharraq won 5–4 on penalties.

15 March 2023
17:00 UTC+0

FC Nouadhibou (Mauritania)	4–1	(Jordan) Shabab Al-Ordon
Tanjy 17', 82'; Faye 49', 52'	Report	Alrialat 2'

Stade Cheikha Ould Boïdiya, Nouakchott
Referee: Adil Zourak (Morocco)
12 April 2023
23:00 UTC+3

Shabab Al-Ordon (Jordan)	1–0	(Mauritania) FC Nouadhibou
Obaid 44'	Report

Al-Hassan Stadium, Irbid
Referee: Muath Owfi (Palestinian)

FC Nouadhibou won 4–2 on aggregate.

15 March 2023
18:30 UTC+3

Kuwait SC	1–0	(Algeria) JS Saoura
Marhoon 60'	Report

Al-Kuwait Sports Club Stadium, Kuwait City
Referee: Faisal Al-Blwi (Saudi Arabia)
21 March 2023
18:00 UTC+1

JS Saoura (Algeria)	1–1	Kuwait SC
Doucene 76'	Report	Khenissi 64'

Miloud Hadefi Stadium, Oran
Referee: Dahane Beida (Mauritania)

Kuwait SC won 2–1 on aggregate.

=== Second qualifying round ===
The second qualifying first legs were played between 7 May and 4 July 2023, and the second legs between 11 May and 7 July 2023.

Team 1	Agg.	Team 2	1st leg	2nd leg
ASFAR (Morocco)	0–3	(United Arab Emirates) Al-Wahda	0–0	0–3
Tishreen (Syria)	2–4 (Note: Both legs were played in Prince Faisal bin Fahd Stadium, Riyadh, Saudi Arabia.)	(Saudi Arabia) Al-Shabab	1–1	1–3
Al-Hilal Omdurman (Sudan)	1–2 (Note: Both legs were played in Tunisia due to the Sudan conflict.)	(Tunisia) CS Sfaxien	1–0	0–2
Al-Ahli Tripoli (Libya)	4–2	(Oman) Al-Nahda	4–2	0–0
US Monastir (Tunisia)	3–0	(Bahrain) Al-Muharraq	2–0	1–0
FC Nouadhibou (Mauritania)	1–3	Kuwait SC	1–2	0–1

Notes

19 May 2023
20:00 UTC+1

ASFAR (Morocco)	0–0	(United Arab Emirates) Al-Wahda
	Report

Prince Moulay Abdellah Stadium, Rabat
Referee: Khaled Al Teris (Saudi Arabia)
24 May 2023
19:45 UTC+4

Al-Wahda (United Arab Emirates)	3–0	(Morocco) ASFAR
Kruspzky 16'; Pedro 54'; Allan 90+6'	Report

Al-Nahyan Stadium, Abu Dhabi
Referee: Adham Makhadmeh (Jordan)

Al-Wahda won 3–0 on aggregate.

7 May 2023
20:30 UTC+3

Tishreen (Syria)	1–1	(Saudi Arabia) Al-Shabab
Mobayed 52'	Report	Mina 90+3'

Prince Faisal bin Fahd Stadium, Riyadh (Saudi Arabia)
Referee: Amin Omar (Egypt)
11 May 2023
20:30 UTC+3

Al-Shabab (Saudi Arabia)	3–1	(Syria) Tishreen
Abdu Jaber 17', 75'; Carlos 37' (pen.)	Report	Hatem 90+3'

Prince Faisal bin Fahd Stadium, Riyadh
Referee: Redouane Jiyed (Morocco)

Al-Shabab won 4–2 on aggregate.

4 July 2023
17:30 UTC+1

Al-Hilal Omdurman (Sudan)	1–0	(Tunisia) CS Sfaxien
Abdelrahman 26' (pen.)	Report

Stade Hammadi Agrebi, Tunis (Tunisia)
Referee: Lahlou Benbraham (Algeria)
7 July 2023
17:30 UTC+1

CS Sfaxien (Tunisia)	2–0	(Sudan) Al-Hilal Omdurman
Saihi 64'; Hmidi 88'	Report

Stade Taïeb Mhiri, Sfax
Referee: Redouane Jiyed (Morocco)

CS Sfaxien won 2–1 on aggregate.

9 May 2023
20:00 UTC+2

Al-Ahli Tripoli (Libya)	4–2	(Oman) Al-Nahda
Saltou 14'; El Monir 20'; Qulaib 30'; El Trbi 45+2'	Report	Al-Alawi 33'; Al Malki 90'

Benina Martyrs Stadium, Benghazi
Referee: Haythem Guirat (Tunisia)
29 May 2023
20:00 UTC+4

Al-Nahda (Oman)	0–0	(Libya) Al-Ahli Tripoli
	Report

Al-Buraimi Sports Complex, Al-Buraimi
Referee: Ammar Mahfoodh (Bahrain)

Al-Ahli Tripoli won 4–2 on aggregate.

21 May 2023
18:00 UTC+1

US Monastir (Tunisia)	2–0	(Bahrain) Al-Muharraq
Boutiche 53' (pen.); Traoré 75'	Report

Stade Mustapha Ben Jannet, Monastir
Referee: Shuhoub Abdulbasit (Libya)
31 May 2023
17:00 UTC+3

Al-Muharraq (Bahrain)	0–1	(Tunisia) US Monastir
	Report	Oumarou 76'

Sheikh Ali bin Mohammed Al-Khalifa Stadium, Muharraq
Referee: Ahmed Al-Kaf (Oman)

US Monastir won 3–0 on aggregate.

2 June 2023
17:00 UTC+0

FC Nouadhibou (Mauritania)	1–2	Kuwait SC
Bodda 49'	Report	Marhoon 66'; Khenissi 82'

Stade Cheikha Ould Boïdiya, Nouakchott
Referee: Youcef Gamouh (Algeria)
8 June 2023
20:45 UTC+3

Kuwait SC	1–0	(Mauritania) FC Nouadhibou
Khenissi 7'	Report

Al-Kuwait Sports Club Stadium, Kuwait City
Referee: Adel Al Naqbi (United Arab Emirates)

Kuwait SC won 3–1 on aggregate.

== Final tournament ==
Location of teams of the 2023 Arab Club Champions Cup group stage.
Brown: Group A; Red: Group B; Orange: Group C; Yellow: Group D;
Black: Multiple teams from same city, shown detailed in the bottom left corner.

The final tournament was held in Saudi Arabia from 27 July to 12 August 2023, across four cities: Abha, Al Bahah, Khamis Mushait and Taif. 16 teams were drawn into four groups of four. Ten teams already entered the group stage directly as league champions from Algeria, Egypt, Iraq, Morocco, Qatar, Saudi Arabia, and Tunisia. In addition the previous edition holders and runners-up, and one invitee selected by UAFA from the host nation enters directly to the group stage. Six teams advanced from the qualifying rounds to complete the 16-teams group stage. The winners and runners-up of each group advanced to the knockout stage.

=== Qualified teams ===
All of the qualified teams for the group stage were as follows:

Teams entered directly to the group stage	Teams qualified from the qualifying round
(Algeria) CR Belouizdad; (Egypt) Zamalek; (Iraq) Al-Shorta; (Morocco) Raja CA; (Morocco) Wydad AC; (Qatar) Al-Sadd; (Saudi Arabia) Al-Hilal; (Saudi Arabia) Al-Nassr; (Saudi Arabia) Al-Ittihad Jeddah; (Tunisia) Espérance de Tunis	Kuwait SC; (Libya) Al-Ahli Tripoli; (Saudi Arabia) Al-Shabab; (Tunisia) CS Sfaxien; (Tunisia) US Monastir; (United Arab Emirates) Al-Wahda

=== Seeding ===
10 teams were directly qualified to the final tournament divided in pot 1, pot 2, and pot 3 based on their football association's FIFA Ranking. The other 6 teams' slots who qualified from the qualifying rounds were drawn in pot 3 and pot 4 prior to this stage.

Pot 1	Pot 2	Pot 3	Pot 4
(Egypt) Zamalek; (Morocco) Raja CA; (Morocco) Wydad AC; (Tunisia) Espérance de Tunis	(Algeria) CR Belouizdad; (Saudi Arabia) Al-Hilal; (Saudi Arabia) Al-Nassr; (Saudi Arabia) Al-Ittihad Jeddah	(Iraq) Al-Shorta; (Qatar) Al-Sadd; (Saudi Arabia) Al-Shabab (Q2); (United Arab Emirates) Al-Wahda (Q1)	Kuwait SC (Q6); (Libya) Al-Ahli Tripoli (Q4); (Tunisia) CS Sfaxien (Q3); (Tunisia) US Monastir (Q5)

=== Draw result ===
Group A
Pos	Team
A1	(Tunisia) Espérance de Tunis
A2	(Saudi Arabia) Al-Ittihad Jeddah
A3	(Tunisia) CS Sfaxien
A4	(Iraq) Al-Shorta

Group B
Pos	Team
B1	(Qatar) Al-Sadd
B2	(Morocco) Wydad AC
B3	(Libya) Al-Ahli Tripoli
B4	(Saudi Arabia) Al-Hilal

Group C
Pos	Team
C1	(Egypt) Zamalek
C2	(Tunisia) US Monastir
C3	(Saudi Arabia) Al-Nassr
C4	(Saudi Arabia) Al-Shabab

Group D
Pos	Team
D1	(Algeria) CR Belouizdad
D2	(Morocco) Raja CA
D3	Kuwait SC
D4	(United Arab Emirates) Al-Wahda

=== Venues ===
Final tournament venues were played in Saudi Arabia in four host cities in Abha, Al Bahah, Khamis Mushait and Taif.

Saudi Arabia
Abha	Al Bahah	Khamis Mushait	Taif
Prince Sultan bin Abdul Aziz Stadium	King Saud Sport City Stadium	Damac Club Stadium	King Fahd Stadium
Capacity: 20,000	Capacity: 10,000	Capacity: 5,000	Capacity: 20,000
2023 Arab Club Champions Cup is located in Saudi Arabia

=== Officials ===
Asia zone

Referees

- (Iraq) Ali Sabah
- (Iraq) Mohanad Qasim Sarray
- (Jordan) Adham Makhadmeh
- (Kuwait) Ahmad Al Ali
- (Qatar) Abdulrahman Al-Jassim
- (Qatar) Mohammed Al Shammari
- (Saudi Arabia) Majed Al-Shamrani
- (Saudi Arabia) Mohammed Al Hoish
- (Saudi Arabia) Khalid Al Turais
- (Syria) Hanna Hattab
- (United Arab Emirates) Ammar Al-Jeneibi
- (United Arab Emirates) Adel Al Naqbi

Assistant referees

- (Bahrain) Abdulla Saleh
- (Bahrain) Mohamed Jaafar Salman
- (Iraq) Hayder Abdulhasan Ali
- (Iraq) Ameer Dawood Hussein
- (Jordan) Ahmed Al Ali
- (Jordan) Mohammad Abu Loum
- (Jordan) Ahmed Al Roalle
- (Kuwait) Abdulhadi Manea
- (Kuwait) Ahmad Sadeq
- (Lebanon) Hussein Abo Yehia
- (Oman) Abu Bakar Al Amri
- (Oman) Rashid Al Ghaithi
- (Qatar) Taleb Salem Al Marri
- (Qatar) Saoud Ahmed Al Maqaleh
- (Saudi Arabia) Faisal Al Qahtani
- (Saudi Arabia) Hesham Al Refai
- (Syria) Ali Ahmad
- (Syria) Mazen Zazfoun
- (United Arab Emirates) Jasem Abdulla Al Ali
- (United Arab Emirates) Ali Rashid Al Nuaimi

Africa zone

Referees

- (Algeria) Lotfi Bekouassa
- (Algeria) Lahlou Benbraham
- (Egypt) Mahmoud El Banna
- (Egypt) Amin Omar
- (Libya) Abdulrazg Ahmed
- (Libya) Abdulwahid Huraywidah
- (Mauritania) Dahane Beida
- (Morocco) Samir Guezzaz
- (Morocco) Redouane Jiyed
- (Tunisia) Sadok Selmi

Assistant referees

- (Algeria) Mokrane Gourari
- (Algeria) Abbes Zerhouni
- (Egypt) Mahmoud Ashour
- (Egypt) Ahmed Hossam Eldin
- (Egypt) Mahmoud Abo El Regal
- (Libya) Wahed Al Jaahawe
- (Libya) Attia Amsaaed
- (Mauritania) Brahim Hmade
- (Mauritania) Mohamed Yahia Youssouf
- (Morocco) Mustapha Akerkad
- (Morocco) Lahcen Azgaou
- (Sudan) Omer Hamid Ahmed
- (Sudan) Mohammed Ibrahim
- (Tunisia) Haythem Guirat
- (Tunisia) Khalil Hassani
- (Tunisia) Aymen Ismail

== Group stage ==
16 teams were drawn into four groups of four. The winners and runners-up of each group advanced to the knockout stage.

=== Tiebreakers ===
The teams were ranked according to points (3 points for a win, 1 point for a draw, 0 points for a loss). If tied on points, tiebreakers were applied in the following order (Regulations IV. 8):

1. Goal difference in all group matches;
2. Goals scored in all group matches;
3. Points in head-to-head matches among tied teams;
4. Goal difference in head-to-head matches among tied teams;
5. Goals scored in head-to-head matches among tied teams;
6. Fair play points in all group matches (only one deduction could be applied to a player in a single match):
  - Yellow card: −1 point;
  - Indirect red card (second yellow card): −3 points;
  - Direct red card: −4 points;
  - Yellow card and direct red card: −5 points;
7. Drawing of lots.

=== Group A ===
Pos	Team	Pld	W	D	L	GF	GA	GD	Pts	Qualification
1	(Saudi Arabia) Al-Ittihad Jeddah	3	3	0	0	5	2	+3	9	Advance to knockout stage
2	(Iraq) Al-Shorta	3	1	1	1	2	2	0	4	Advance to knockout stage
3	(Tunisia) Espérance de Tunis	3	0	2	1	1	2	−1	2	
4	(Tunisia) CS Sfaxien	3	0	1	2	0	2	−2	1	

Source: UAFA
27 July 2023
18:00

CS Sfaxien (Tunisia)	0–1	(Iraq) Al-Shorta
	Report	Abdul-Zahra 64' (pen.)

King Fahd Stadium, Taif
Referee: Majed Al-Shamrani (Saudi Arabia)
27 July 2023
22:00

Espérance de Tunis (Tunisia)	1–2	(Saudi Arabia) Al-Ittihad Jeddah
Bouguerra 26'	Report	Hamdallah 35'; Benzema 55'

King Fahd Stadium, Taif
Referee: Adel Al Naqbi (United Arab Emirates)

30 July 2023
18:00

Al-Shorta (Iraq)	0–0	(Tunisia) Espérance de Tunis
	Report

King Fahd Stadium, Taif
Referee: Mohammed Al-Shammari (Qatar)
30 July 2023
22:00

Al-Ittihad Jeddah (Saudi Arabia)	1–0	(Tunisia) CS Sfaxien
Benzema 63'	Report

King Fahd Stadium, Taif
Referee: Lahlou Benbraham (Algeria)

2 August 2023
18:00

Espérance de Tunis (Tunisia)	0–0	(Tunisia) CS Sfaxien
	Report

King Saud Sport City Stadium, Al Bahah
Referee: Ahmad Al Ali (Kuwait)
2 August 2023
18:00

Al-Shorta (Iraq)	1–2	(Saudi Arabia) Al-Ittihad Jeddah
Moumouni 80'	Report	Bamsaud 36'; Benzema 84' (pen.)

King Fahd Stadium, Taif
Referee: Ammar Al-Jeneibi (United Arab Emirates)

=== Group B ===
Pos	Team	Pld	W	D	L	GF	GA	GD	Pts	Qualification
1	(Qatar) Al-Sadd	3	2	1	0	4	2	+2	7	Advance to knockout stage
2	(Saudi Arabia) Al-Hilal	3	1	1	1	4	4	0	4	Advance to knockout stage
3	(Morocco) Wydad AC	3	0	2	1	2	3	−1	2	
4	(Libya) Al-Ahli Tripoli	3	0	2	1	1	2	−1	2	

Source: UAFA
27 July 2023
16:00

Al-Sadd (Qatar)	0–0	(Morocco) Wydad AC
	Report

Prince Sultan bin Abdul Aziz Stadium, Abha
Referee: Mahmoud El Banna (Egypt)
27 July 2023
20:00

Al-Ahli Tripoli (Libya)	0–0	(Saudi Arabia) Al-Hilal
	Report

Prince Sultan bin Abdul Aziz Stadium, Abha
Referee: Adham Makhadmeh (Jordan)

30 July 2023
16:00

Wydad AC (Morocco)	1–1	(Libya) Al-Ahli Tripoli
El Amloud 45+2'	Report	Krawa'a 48'

Prince Sultan bin Abdul Aziz Stadium, Abha
Referee: Sadok Selmi (Tunisia)
30 July 2023
20:00

Al-Hilal (Saudi Arabia)	2–3	(Qatar) Al-Sadd
Michael 10'; S. Al-Dawsari 68' (pen.)	Report	Bounedjah 40'; Salman 51'; Plata 90+3'

Prince Sultan bin Abdul Aziz Stadium, Abha
Referee: Dahane Beida (Mauritania)

2 August 2023
16:00

Al-Sadd (Qatar)	1–0	(Libya) Al-Ahli Tripoli
Otávio 89'	Report

Damac Club Stadium, Khamis Mushait
Referee: Haythem Guirat (Tunisia)
2 August 2023
16:00

Al-Hilal (Saudi Arabia)	2–1	(Morocco) Wydad AC
Milinković-Savić 41'; Neves 66'	Report	Bouhra 64'

Prince Sultan bin Abdul Aziz Stadium, Abha
Referee: Ali Sabah (Iraq)

=== Group C ===
Pos	Team	Pld	W	D	L	GF	GA	GD	Pts	Qualification
1	(Saudi Arabia) Al-Shabab	3	2	1	0	2	0	+2	7	Advance to knockout stage
2	(Saudi Arabia) Al-Nassr	3	1	2	0	5	2	+3	5	Advance to knockout stage
3	(Egypt) Zamalek	3	1	1	1	5	2	+3	4	
4	(Tunisia) US Monastir	3	0	0	3	1	9	−8	0	

Source: UAFA
28 July 2023
18:00

Zamalek (Egypt)	4–0	(Tunisia) US Monastir
Ben Saïd 26' (o.g.); Zizo 43'; Abdallah 56', 64'	Report

King Fahd Stadium, Taif
Referee: Samir Guezzaz (Morocco)
28 July 2023
22:00

Al-Nassr (Saudi Arabia)	0–0	(Saudi Arabia) Al-Shabab
	Report

King Fahd Stadium, Taif
Referee: Lotfi Bekouassa (Algeria)

31 July 2023
18:00

Al-Shabab (Saudi Arabia)	1–0	(Egypt) Zamalek
Banega 44' (pen.)	Report

King Fahd Stadium, Taif
Referee: Abdulwahid Huraywidah (Libya)
31 July 2023
22:00

US Monastir (Tunisia)	1–4	(Saudi Arabia) Al-Nassr
Lajami 66' (o.g.)	Report	Talisca 42'; Ronaldo 74'; Al-Amri 88'; Al-Elewai 90'

King Fahd Stadium, Taif
Referee: Abdulrahman Al-Jassim (Qatar)

3 August 2023
18:00

Zamalek (Egypt)	1–1	(Saudi Arabia) Al-Nassr
Zizo 54' (pen.)	Report	Ronaldo 87'

King Fahd Stadium, Taif
Referee: Redouane Jiyed (Morocco)
3 August 2023
18:00

Al-Shabab (Saudi Arabia)	1–0	(Tunisia) US Monastir
Banega 26' (pen.)	Report

King Saud Sport City Stadium, Al Bahah
Referee: Mohanad Qasim Sarray (Iraq)

=== Group D ===
Pos	Team	Pld	W	D	L	GF	GA	GD	Pts	Qualification
1	(Morocco) Raja CA	3	3	0	0	5	1	+4	9	Advance to knockout stage
2	(United Arab Emirates) Al-Wahda	3	2	0	1	4	3	+1	6	Advance to knockout stage
3	(Algeria) CR Belouizdad	3	0	1	2	3	5	−2	1	
4	Kuwait SC	3	0	1	2	2	5	−3	1	

Source: UAFA
28 July 2023
16:00

CR Belouizdad (Algeria)	1–2	(Morocco) Raja CA
Hadded 10'	Report	Bouzok 58' (pen.); Arrassi 90+4'

Prince Sultan bin Abdul Aziz Stadium, Abha
Referee: Ali Sabah (Iraq)
28 July 2023
20:00

Kuwait SC	1–2	(United Arab Emirates) Al-Wahda
Al-Dhefiri 90+2'	Report	Al-Mansoori 72'; Pedro 77'

Prince Sultan bin Abdul Aziz Stadium, Abha
Referee: Abdulrazg Ahmed (Libya)

31 July 2023
16:00

Al-Wahda (United Arab Emirates)	2–1	(Algeria) CR Belouizdad
Kruspzky 44'; Guanca 61'	Report	Bouguerra 84'

Prince Sultan bin Abdul Aziz Stadium, Abha
Referee: Khaled Al Teris (Saudi Arabia)
31 July 2023
20:00

Raja CA (Morocco)	2–0	Kuwait SC
Rahimi 52'; Zrida 63'	Report

Prince Sultan bin Abdul Aziz Stadium, Abha
Referee: Amin Omar (Egypt)

3 August 2023
16:00

CR Belouizdad (Algeria)	1–1	Kuwait SC
Belkhir 6'	Report	Khenissi 87' (pen.)

Damac Club Stadium, Khamis Mushait
Referee: Hanna Hattab (Syria)
3 August 2023
16:00

Al-Wahda (United Arab Emirates)	0–1	(Morocco) Raja CA
	Report	El Wardi 26'

Prince Sultan bin Abdul Aziz Stadium, Abha
Referee: Mohammed Al Hoaish (Saudi Arabia)

== Knockout stage ==
=== Qualified teams ===
The knockout phase involved the eight teams which qualified as winners and runners-up of each of the eight groups in the group stage. The quarter-finals were followed by the semi-finals and final, played in a single leg knockout format. In the case of a draw after 90 minutes, extra time would be played only in the final.

Group	Winners	Runners-up
A	(Saudi Arabia) Al-Ittihad Jeddah	(Iraq) Al-Shorta
B	(Qatar) Al-Sadd	(Saudi Arabia) Al-Hilal
C	(Saudi Arabia) Al-Shabab	(Saudi Arabia) Al-Nassr
D	(Morocco) Raja CA	(United Arab Emirates) Al-Wahda

=== Bracket ===
Quarter-finals
5 August – Taif
(Saudi Arabia) Al-Ittihad Jeddah	1
(Saudi Arabia) Al-Hilal	3
6 August – Taif
(Saudi Arabia) Al-Shabab (p)	0 (5)
(United Arab Emirates) Al-Wahda	0 (4)
5 August – Abha
(Qatar) Al-Sadd	2
(Iraq) Al-Shorta	4
6 August – Abha
(Morocco) Raja CA	1
(Saudi Arabia) Al-Nassr	3

Semi-finals
9 August – Taif
(Saudi Arabia) Al-Hilal	3
(Saudi Arabia) Al-Shabab	1
9 August – Abha
(Iraq) Al-Shorta	0
(Saudi Arabia) Al-Nassr	1

Final
12 August – Taif
(Saudi Arabia) Al-Hilal	1
(Saudi Arabia) Al-Nassr (a.e.t.)	2

=== Quarter-finals ===
5 August 2023
21:00

Al-Ittihad Jeddah (Saudi Arabia)	1–3	(Saudi Arabia) Al-Hilal
Romarinho 56'	Report	Milinković-Savić 14'; S. Al-Dawsari 45+3' (pen.); Malcom 70'

King Fahd Stadium, Taif
Referee: Abdulrahman Al-Jassim (Qatar)

5 August 2023
18:00

Al-Sadd (Qatar)	2–4	(Iraq) Al-Shorta
Afif 24' (pen.), 81'	Report	Sabah 32'; Rostam 59' (pen.), 78'; Farhan 70'

Prince Sultan bin Abdul Aziz Stadium, Abha
Referee: Khaled Al Teris (Saudi Arabia)

6 August 2023
21:00

Al-Shabab (Saudi Arabia)	0–0	(United Arab Emirates) Al-Wahda
	Report
Penalties
Banega (penalty scored); Al-Tambakti (penalty scored); Bahebri (penalty scored); Al-Ammar (penalty scored); Kanabah (penalty scored)	5–4	(penalty scored) Pedro; (penalty scored) Guanca; (penalty missed) Jumaa; (penalty scored) Nourollahi; (penalty scored) Pimenta

King Fahd Stadium, Taif
Referee: Lahlou Benbraham (Algeria)

6 August 2023
18:00

Raja CA (Morocco)	1–3	(Saudi Arabia) Al-Nassr
Madu 41' (o.g.)	Report	Ronaldo 19'; S. Al-Ghannam 29'; Fofana 38'

Prince Sultan bin Abdul Aziz Stadium, Abha
Referee: Mahmoud El Banna (Egypt)

=== Semi-finals ===
9 August 2023
21:00

Al-Hilal (Saudi Arabia)	3–1	(Saudi Arabia) Al-Shabab
Kanno 9'; Malcom 45+3'; Al-Hamdan 90+5'	Report	Cuéllar 56'

King Fahd Stadium, Taif
Referee: Amin Omar (Egypt)

9 August 2023
18:00

Al-Shorta (Iraq)	0–1	(Saudi Arabia) Al-Nassr
	Report	Ronaldo 75' (pen.)

Prince Sultan bin Abdul Aziz Stadium, Abha
Referee: Adel Al Naqbi (United Arab Emirates)

=== Final ===
12 August 2023
18:00

Al-Hilal (Saudi Arabia)	1–2 (a.e.t.)	(Saudi Arabia) Al-Nassr
Michael 51'	Report	Ronaldo 74', 98'

King Fahd Stadium, Taif
Referee: Redouane Jiyed (Morocco)

== Top goalscorers ==
=== Final tournament ===
Team eliminated / inactive for the round.

Rank	Player	Team	GS1	GS2	GS3	QF	SF	F	Total
1	(Portugal) Cristiano Ronaldo	(Saudi Arabia) Al-Nassr		1	1	1	1	2	6
2	(France) Karim Benzema	(Saudi Arabia) Al-Ittihad Jeddah	1	1	1				3
3	(Brazil) Malcom	(Saudi Arabia) Al-Hilal				1	1		2
3	(Brazil) Michael	(Saudi Arabia) Al-Hilal		1				1	2
3	(Saudi Arabia) Salem Al-Dawsari	(Saudi Arabia) Al-Hilal		1		1			2
3	(Serbia) Sergej Milinković-Savić	(Saudi Arabia) Al-Hilal			1	1			2
3	(Iraq) Aso Rostam	(Iraq) Al-Shorta				2			2
3	(Argentina) Éver Banega	(Saudi Arabia) Al-Shabab		1	1				2
3	(Qatar) Akram Afif	(Qatar) Al-Sadd				2			2
3	(Egypt) Sayed Abdallah	(Egypt) Zamalek	2						2
3	(Egypt) Zizo	(Egypt) Zamalek	1		1				2

38 players scored 1 goal
Rank	Player	Team	GS1	GS2	GS3	QF	SF	F	Total
12	(Portugal) Rúben Neves	(Saudi Arabia) Al-Hilal			1				1
12	(Saudi Arabia) Abdullah Al-Hamdan	(Saudi Arabia) Al-Hilal					1		1
12	(Saudi Arabia) Mohamed Kanno	(Saudi Arabia) Al-Hilal					1		1
12	(Brazil) Talisca	(Saudi Arabia) Al-Nassr		1					1
12	(Ivory Coast) Seko Fofana	(Saudi Arabia) Al-Nassr				1			1
12	(Saudi Arabia) Abdulelah Al-Amri	(Saudi Arabia) Al-Nassr		1					1
12	(Saudi Arabia) Abdulaziz Al-Elewai	(Saudi Arabia) Al-Nassr		1					1
12	(Saudi Arabia) Sultan Al-Ghannam	(Saudi Arabia) Al-Nassr				1			1
12	(Iraq) Alaa Abdul-Zahra	(Iraq) Al-Shorta	1						1
12	(Iraq) Ahmed Farhan	(Iraq) Al-Shorta				1			1
12	(Iraq) Ameer Sabah Khudhair	(Iraq) Al-Shorta				1			1
12	(Niger) Abdoul Madjid Moumouni	(Iraq) Al-Shorta			1				1
12	(Colombia) Gustavo Cuéllar	(Saudi Arabia) Al-Shabab					1		1
12	(Algeria) Yousri Bouzok	(Morocco) Raja CA	1						1
12	(Morocco) Bouchaib Arrassi	(Morocco) Raja CA	1						1
12	(Morocco) Zakaria El Wardi	(Morocco) Raja CA			1				1
12	(Morocco) Houssine Rahimi	(Morocco) Raja CA		1					1
12	(Morocco) Mohamed Zrida	(Morocco) Raja CA		1					1
12	(Algeria) Baghdad Bounedjah	(Qatar) Al-Sadd		1					1
12	(Brazil) Paulo Otávio	(Qatar) Al-Sadd			1				1
12	(Ecuador) Gonzalo Plata	(Qatar) Al-Sadd		1					1
12	(Qatar) Tarek Salman	(Qatar) Al-Sadd		1					1
12	(Brazil) Romarinho	(Saudi Arabia) Ittithad Jeddah				1			1
12	(Morocco) Abderrazak Hamdallah	(Saudi Arabia) Ittithad Jeddah	1						1
12	(Saudi Arabia) Ahmed Bamsaud	(Saudi Arabia) Ittithad Jeddah			1				1
12	(Argentina) Cristian Guanca	(United Arab Emirates) Al-Wahda		1					1
12	(Argentina) Facundo Kruspzky	(United Arab Emirates) Al-Wahda		1					1
12	(Brazil) João Pedro	(United Arab Emirates) Al-Wahda	1						1
12	(United Arab Emirates) Suhail Al-Mansoori	(United Arab Emirates) Al-Wahda	1						1
12	(Algeria) Mohamed Islam Belkhir	(Algeria) CR Belouizdad			1				1
12	(Algeria) Aimen Bouguerra	(Algeria) CR Belouizdad		1					1
12	(Algeria) Mouad Hadded	(Algeria) CR Belouizdad	1						1
12	(Kuwait) Ahmed Al-Dhefiri	Kuwait SC	1						1
12	(Tunisia) Taha Yassine Khenissi	Kuwait SC			1				1
12	(Libya) Ahmed Krawa'a	(Libya) Al-Ahli Tripoli		1					1
12	(Morocco) Saifeddine Bouhra	(Morocco) Wydad AC			1				1
12	(Morocco) Ayoub El Amloud	(Morocco) Wydad AC		1					1
12	(Tunisia) Oussama Bouguerra	(Tunisia) Espérance de Tunis	1						1

=== Preliminary and qualifying rounds ===
Team eliminated / not participated in the round.
Player is not in the team but team was active for the round.

Rank	Player	Team	P1	PO	1Q1	1Q2	2Q1	2Q2	Total
1	(Tunisia) Taha Yassine Khenissi	Kuwait SC				1	1	1	3
1	(Mali) Boubacar Traore	(Tunisia) US Monastir			2		1		3
1	(Morocco) Abdelghafour Mihri	(Libya) Al-Ittihad Tripoli				3			3
4	(Bahrain) Mohamed Marhoon	Kuwait SC			1		1		2
4	(Libya) Mohamed El Monir	(Libya) Al-Ahli Tripoli			1		1		2
4	(Libya) Anis Saltou	(Libya) Al-Ahli Tripoli				1	1		2
4	(Mauritania) Hemeya Tanjy	(Mauritania) FC Nouadhibou			2				2
4	(Senegal) Ousmane Faye	(Mauritania) FC Nouadhibou			2				2
4	(Morocco) Mustapha Sahd	(Morocco) ASFAR			1	1			2
4	(Oman) Omar Al-Maliki	(Oman) Al-Nahda			1		1		2
4	(Gabon) Aaron Boupendza	(Saudi Arabia) Al-Shabab			1	1			2
4	(Eritrea) Ahmed Abdu Jaber	(Saudi Arabia) Al-Shabab							2
4	(Sudan) Mohamed Abdelrahman	(Sudan) Al-Hilal Omdurman			1		1		2
4	(Syria) Abdulrazzaq Al-Mohamad	(Syria) Tishreen			1	1			2
4	(Tunisia) Idriss Mhirsi	(Tunisia) US Monastir			2				2
4	(Brazil) Allan	(United Arab Emirates) Al-Wahda				1		1	2
4	(Oman) Abdul Aziz Al-Muqbali	(Oman) Al-Seeb				2			2
4	(Yemen) Aidarous Awad	(Yemen) Fahman		2					2

51 players scored 1 goal
Rank	Player	Team	P1	PO	1Q1	1Q2	2Q1	2Q2	Total
19	(Algeria) Hacène Ogbi	(Bahrain) Al-Muharraq			1				1
19	(Colombia) Victor Arboleda	(Bahrain) Al-Muharraq			1				1
19	(Libya) Ahmed El Trbi	(Libya) Al-Ahli Tripoli					1		1
19	(Libya) Ali Maatouk	(Libya) Al-Ahli Tripoli			1				1
19	(Libya) Noureddine Qulaib	(Libya) Al-Ahli Tripoli					1		1
19	(Mauritania) Mouhsine Bodda	(Mauritania) FC Nouadhibou					1		1
19	(Ivory Coast) Joseph Guédé Gnadou	(Morocco) ASFAR			1				1
19	(Morocco) Adam Ennafati	(Morocco) ASFAR			1				1
19	(Morocco) Ahmad Hamoudan	(Morocco) ASFAR			1				1
19	(Oman) Rabia Al-Alawi	(Oman) Al-Nahda					1		1
19	(Guinea) Demba Camara	(Oman) Al-Nahda			1				1
19	(Argentina) Ever Banega	(Saudi Arabia) Al-Shabab				1			1
19	(Argentina) Cristian Guanca	(Saudi Arabia) Al-Shabab				1			1
19	(Brazil) Carlos	(Saudi Arabia) Al-Shabab						1	1
19	(Saudi Arabia) Hassan Al-Tambakti	(Saudi Arabia) Al-Shabab				1			1
19	(Spain) Santi Mina	(Saudi Arabia) Al-Shabab					1		1
19	(Democratic Republic of the Congo) Makabi Lilepo	(Sudan) Al-Hilal Omdurman			1				1
19	(Democratic Republic of the Congo) Fabrice Ngoma	(Sudan) Al-Hilal Omdurman			1				1
19	(Ghana) David Abagna	(Sudan) Al-Hilal Omdurman				1			1
19	(Syria) Ahmad Hatem	(Syria) Tishreen						1	1
19	(Syria) Khaled Mobayed	(Syria) Tishreen					1		1
19	(Guinea) Mohamed Kanté	(Tunisia) CS Sfaxien				1			1
19	(Tunisia) Baraket Hmidi	(Tunisia) CS Sfaxien						1	1
19	(Tunisia) Aziz Saihi	(Tunisia) CS Sfaxien						1	1
19	(Algeria) Abdelkader Boutiche	(Tunisia) US Monastir					1		1
19	(Niger) Youssouf Oumarou	(Tunisia) US Monastir						1	1
19	(Tunisia) Zied Aloui	(Tunisia) US Monastir				1			1
19	(Tunisia) Ahmed Jaffali	(Tunisia) US Monastir				1			1
19	(Argentina) Facundo Kruspzky	(United Arab Emirates) Al-Wahda						1	1
19	(Brazil) João Pedro	(United Arab Emirates) Al-Wahda						1	1
19	(Brazil) Matheus Pereira	(United Arab Emirates) Al-Wahda			1				1
19	(Tunisia) Alaeddine Zouhir	(United Arab Emirates) Al-Wahda			1				1
19	(United Arab Emirates) Abdullah Al Karbi	(United Arab Emirates) Al-Wahda			1				1
19	(Algeria) Lyes Doucene	(Algeria) JS Saoura				1			1
19	(Bahrain) Ebrahim Al-Khatal	(Bahrain) Manama				1			1
19	(Bahrain) Isa Moosa	(Bahrain) Manama				1			1
19	(Egypt) Karim Tarek	(Egypt) Tala'ea El-Gaish			1				1
19	(Nigeria) Paul Julius	(Egypt) Tala'ea El-Gaish				1			1
19	(Iraq) Karrar Nabeel	(Iraq) Al-Quwa Al-Jawiya			1				1
19	(Jordan) Wasim Alrialat	(Jordan) Shabab Al-Ordon			1				1
19	(Jordan) Saleem Obaid	(Jordan) Shabab Al-Ordon				1			1
19	(Libya) Muad Eisa	(Libya) Al-Ittihad Tripoli			1				1
19	(Argentina) Javier Pastore	Qatar SC				1			1
19	(Brazil) Paulo Sergio	(Sudan) Al-Merrikh			1				1
19	(Sudan) Al-Jezoli Nouh	(Sudan) Al-Merrikh			1				1
19	(Yemen) Wajdi Alratil	(Yemen) Fahman	1						1
19	(Yemen) Mohammed Mahdi	(Yemen) Fahman	1						1
19	(Yemen) Suleiman Rajeh	(Yemen) Fahman	1						1
19	(Burkina Faso) Alain Traoré	(Djibouti) Arta Solar 7		1					1
19	(Djibouti) Samuel Akinbinu	(Djibouti) Arta Solar 7	1						1
19	(Ivory Coast) Salomon Kalou	(Djibouti) Arta Solar 7	1						1

== Broadcasting ==
The following channels broadcast the 2023 Arab Club Champions Cup.

2023 Arab Club Champions Cup Media Coverage
Country/Region	Television Channel
Italy	Final: Sportitalia
Middle East and North Africa	Qualifying rounds only: (Qatar) Alkass Sports Channels; (Saudi Arabia) KSA Sport; (United Arab Emirates) AD Sports; (United Arab Emirates) Dubai Sports; Final tournament: (Saudi Arabia) SSC (Streaming via Shahid)
