= List of football clubs in Yemen =

This is a list of association football clubs in Yemen, including clubs competing in the Yemeni League and the second level of Yemeni football.

== Yemeni League Clubs ==
Locations of teams in the 2023-24 Yemeni League

Yemeni League
Club	Location	Stadium
Al-Saqr Ta'izz	Ta'izz	Al Shohada Stadium
Salam Al-Garfa	Al Garfa	Al Garfa Stadium
Al-Sha'ab Hadramaut	Mukalla	Baradem Mukalla Stadium
Al-Ahli San'a	San'a	Ali Muhesen Stadium
Al-Tali'aa Taizz	Ta'izz	Al Shohada Stadium
Al-Oruba Zabid	Zabid	Ali Muhesen Stadium
Al-Yarmuk Al-Rawda	San'a	Ali Muhesen Stadium
Al-Wahda San'a	San'a	Ali Muhesen Stadium
Al Sha'ab Ibb	Ibb	22 May Stadium
Al-Hilal Hudayda	Al Hudaydah	Al Ulufi Stadium
Fahman SCC	Mudiyah	Mudiyah Stadium
Al-Tadamun Hadramaut	Mukalla	Baradem Mukalla Stadium
Al-Ittihad Ibb	Ibb	May 22 Stadium
Samaon	San'a	Ali Muhesen Stadium

== 2nd Level ==
Yemeni League Second Level
Club	Location	Stadium
Al Yarmuk Al Rawda	San'a	
Al-Eli Hamudi (Hadiboh)		
Al-Wufaa (Aden)	Aden	
Al-Wahda (Aden)	Aden	
May 22 San'a'	San'a	
Salam (al-Garfa)	Al Garfa	
Al-Shula		
Shabah Al Jeel		
