= Hassan Abdulrahman (footballer) =

Emirati footballer (born 1989)

Personal information
- Full name: Hassan Abdulrahman Al-Jabri
- Date of birth: 11 February 1989 (age 37)
- Place of birth: United Arab Emirates
- Height: 1.74 m (5 ft 8 1/2 in)
- Position: Midfielder

Youth career
- Dubai

Senior career*
Years	Team	Apps	(Gls)
2010–2015	Dubai	78	(12)
2015–2016	Al Ahli	9	(0)
2016–2017	Dubai		
2017–2018	Emirates	7	(0)
2018–2021	Ajman	49	(2)
2021–2022	Hatta		
- * Club domestic league appearances and goals

Hassan Abdulrahman (Arabic:حسن عبد الرحمن; born 11 February 1989) is an Emirati footballer who plays as a midfielder.
