= Salem Saeed =

Yemeni footballer

Personal information
- Full name: Salem Abdullah Awadh Saeed
- Date of birth: 1 January 1984 (age 42)
- Height: 1.75 m (5 ft 9 in)
- Position: Goalkeeper

Team information
- Current team: Fahman SCC
- Number: 1

Senior career*
Years	Team	Apps	(Gls)
2001–2006	Hassan Abyan		
2006–2009	Al-Nasr		
2009–2012	Al-Hilal Al-Sahili		
2012–2013	Al-Mussanah		
2013–2014	Al-Wehda Club		
2014–2022	Al-Ahli Club Sana'a		
2022–	Fahman SCC		

International career^{‡}
2002–2019	Yemen	82	(0)
- * Club domestic league appearances and goals as of 07:33, 8 August 2019 (UTC) ‡ National team caps and goals as of 10:52, 8 June 2024 (UTC)

Salem Abdullah Awadh Saeed (born 1 January 1984) is a Yemeni international footballer who plays for Al-Ahli Club Sana'a as a goalkeeper.

== Career ==
Saeed has played club football in Yemen and Oman for Hassan Abyan, Al-Nasr, Al-Hilal Al-Sahili, Al-Mussanah, Al-Wehda Club and Al-Ahli Club Sana'a.

He made his international debut for Yemen in 2007, and has appeared for them in FIFA World Cup qualifying matches.
