= Fahad Al-Dhanhani =

Emirati footballer (born 1991)

Personal information
- Full name: Fahad Al-Dhanhani
- Date of birth: 3 September 1991 (age 35)
- Place of birth: United Arab Emirates
- Height: 1.75 m (5 ft 9 in)
- Position: Goalkeeper

Team information
- Current team: Baniyas
- Number: 55

Youth career
- 2006–2007: Al-Fujairah SC
- 2007–2012: Al-Wahda

Senior career*
Years	Team	Apps	(Gls)
2012–2018	Al-Wahda	1	(0)
2016–2018	→ Dibba Al-Fujairah (loan)	48	(0)
2018–	Baniyas	202	(0)

International career^{‡}
2019–	United Arab Emirates	3	(0)
- * Club domestic league appearances and goals as of 17 September 2026 ‡ National team caps and goals as of 17 November 2026

Fahad Al-Dhanhani (Arabic: فهد الظنحاني; born 3 September 1991) is an Emirati footballer. He currently plays as a goalkeeper for Baniyas and the United Arab Emirates national team.

== International ==
He made his debut for the United Arab Emirates national football team on 26 March 2019 in a friendly against Syria.
