= Suhail Al-Mansoori =

Emirati footballer (born 1993)

Personal information
- Full name: Suhail Al-Mansoori
- Date of birth: 19 May 1993 (age 33)
- Place of birth: United Arab Emirates
- Height: 1.71 m (5 ft 7 1/2 in)
- Position: Midfielder

Youth career
- Al-Wahda

Senior career*
Years	Team	Apps	(Gls)
2013–2018	Al-Wahda	39	(1)
2018	→ Al-Sharjah (loan)	8	(1)
2018–2022	Al Dhafra	58	(12)
2022–2024	Al-Wahda	10	(0)

International career
2019–	UAE		
- * Club domestic league appearances and goals

Suhail Al-Mansoori (Arabic:سهيل المنصوري) (born 19 May 1993) is an Emirati footballer who plays as a midfielder. He played for Al-Wahda at the junior level before being promoted to the senior team in 2013 making 39 appearances with a lone goal. he left Al-Wahda in 2018 and moved to Al-Sharja on loan making 8 appearances and scored one goal there. In 2018, he transferred to Al Dhafra where he has since scored 11 goals in 55 appearances.
