= Nasser Abdulhadi =

Emirati footballer (born 1989)

Personal information
- Full name: Nasser Abdulhadi
- Date of birth: 16 December 1989 (age 36)
- Place of birth: United Arab Emirates
- Height: 1.68 m (5 ft 6 in)
- Position: Midfielder

Youth career
- Emirates

Senior career*
Years	Team	Apps	(Gls)
2011–2014	Emirates		
2014–2015	Ajman	13	(0)
2015–2016	Dibba Club	23	(1)
2016–2019	Al-Wahda	31	(0)
2017	→ Dibba Al-Fujairah (loan)	11	(0)
2019–2022	Ittihad Kalba	54	(0)
2022–2024	Ajman	24	(0)
- * Club domestic league appearances and goals

Nasser Abdulhadi (Arabic:ناصر عبد الهادي) (born 16 December 1989) is an Emirati footballer. He currently plays as a midfielder.
