= Facundo Kruspzky =

Argentine footballer (born 2002)

Personal information
- Full name: Facundo Daniel Kruspzky
- Date of birth: 28 July 2002 (age 24)
- Place of birth: Tucuman, Argentina
- Height: 1.81 m (5 ft 11 in)
- Position: Forward

Team information
- Current team: Al Wahda
- Number: 11

Youth career
- Arsenal de Sarandí

Senior career*
Years	Team	Apps	(Gls)
2020–2023	Arsenal de Sarandí	59	(10)
2023–	Al Wahda	75	(20)
- * Club domestic league appearances and goals as of 16 March 2026

Facundo Daniel Kruspzky (born 28 July 2002) is an Argentine professional footballer who plays as a forward for UAE Pro League side Al Wahda.

== Career ==
Kruspzky is a product of the Arsenal de Sarandí academy. His move into first-team football occurred towards the end of 2020, as the midfielder participated in a number of pre-season friendlies; including against Argentinos Juniors and Boca Juniors. He made his senior debut in a Copa de la Liga Profesional draw away to Unión Santa Fe on 1 November, featuring for the final moments of a match that ended goalless after coming on in place of Nicolás Miracco.

== Personal life ==
Kruspzky's older brother, Lucas, is also a professional footballer.

== Career statistics ==
As of 18 September 2023.

Appearances and goals by club, season and competition
Club	Season	League			Cup		League Cup		Continental		Other		Total	
Club	Season	Division	Apps	Goals	Apps	Goals	Apps	Goals	Apps	Goals	Apps	Goals	Apps	Goals
Arsenal	2020–21	Primera División	6	0	0	0	0	0	—		0	0	6	0
Arsenal	2021	Primera División	16	0	0	0	0	0	—		0	0	16	0
Arsenal	2022	Primera División	37	10	1	0	0	0	—		0	0	38	10
Arsenal	Total		59	10	1	0	0	0	—		0	0	60	10
Al Wahda	2022–23	UPL	14	5	0	0	0	0	—		0	0	14	5
Al Wahda	2023–24	UPL	2	0	0	0	2	4	—		3	1	2	0
Al Wahda	Total		16	5	0	0	2	4	—		3	1	21	10
Career total			75	15	1	0	2	4	—		3	1	81	20
