= Cemşir Muratoğlu =

Turkish football coach (born 1959)

- Born: 10 July 1959 (age 66)
- Education: Licence: University of Kosovo Faculty of Physical Educations, Post-graduate: University of Belgrade Faculty of Physical Education (Football Department) in Former Yugoslavia. UEFA PRO Licence Holder
- Occupation: football Coach
- Employer: Al Shaab Club (UAE)

Cemşir Muratoğlu (born 10 July 1959) is a Turkish football coach, and a former assistant coach at Beşiktaş JK, Altay SK, Konyaspor, UAE National Team, Al Wahda (Saudi Arabia), Al Nassr (Saudi Arabia), Fenerbahçe SK, Trabzonspor head coach at Kastamonuspor, UAE National Team U-17, Bilecikspor, Yıldırım Bosnaspor, Thy SK, Vanspor, Al Shaab Club (Youth Development).

== Playing career ==
- 1976-80: Yıldırım Bosna F.C. (amateur)
- 1989/90: Bilecikspor F.C. player/coach (Professional 3.League Turkey)

== Work with National Teams ==
- 1995/96: U.A.E National Team Under 17
- 1996: U.A.E National First Team assistant coach

== Club career ==
- 1985/86: F.C. Beşiktaş (Turkish Super League) assistant coach
- 1986/87: F.C. Beşiktaş (Turkish Super League) assistant coach
- 1987/88: F.C. Altay (Turkish Super League) assistant coach
- 1988/89: F.C. Konyaspor (Turkish Super League) assistant coach
- 1990/91: F.C. Bilecikspor (Third Turkish League) head coach
- 1991/92: F.C. Kastamonuspor (Third Turkish League) head coach
- 1992/93: F.C. Bilecikspor (Third Turkish League) head coach
- 1993/94: F.C. Yıldırım Bosna (Second Turkish League) head coach for all categories
- 1994/95: F.C. Fenerbahçe (Turkish Super League) assistant coach
- 1995/96: U.A.E. National Football Team U-17 head coach
- 1995/96: U.A.E. National Football Team assistant coach
- 1997/98: F.C. Fenerbahçe (Turkish Super League( assistant coach
- 1999/00: F.C. Yıldırım Bosna (Second Turkish League) supervisor of all categories
- 2002/03: Al-Wehda F.C. (Second Saudi Arabian League) head coach
- 2003/04: F.C. Yıldırım Bosna (Second Turkish League) supervisor of all categories
- 2004/05: Al Nasser F.C. (First Saudi Arabian League) assistant coach
- 2004/05: Darıca Gençlerbirliği (Second Turkish League) head coach
- 2005/06: F.C. Trabzonspor (Turkish Super League) assistant coach
- 2008/09: F.C. Alibeyköyspor (Second Turkish League) head coach
- 2009/10/11: F.C. Turkish Airlines (Turkish Super Amateur League, İstanbul) head coach
- 2012/Continues: Al Shaab Club (United Arab Emirates) head coach of youth development

== Notable achievements ==
- Placed third with UAE U-17 at the Asian games (head coach)
- Turkish Super League Champion with Beşiktaş JK in 1985–1986 season (assistant coach)
- Placed second with UAE National first team at 1996 Asian Football Cup (assistant coach)
- Promoted to the Saudi Arabian first league with Al-Wahda FC (Mecca)
- Turkish Prime Minister Cup Winner with Fenerbahçe SK (head coach)
- Yıldırım Bosna SK. Istanbul Champion with youth team
- League Champion with Fenerbahçe PAF team (director of youth development)
