= Sanad Ali =

Emirati footballer (born 1988)

Personal information
- Full name: Sanad Ali Ibrahim Al-Bloushi
- Date of birth: 13 November 1988 (age 38)
- Place of birth: United Arab Emirates
- Height: 1.75 m (5 ft 9 in)
- Position: Forward

Youth career
- 2004–2008: Al Nasr

Senior career*
Years	Team	Apps	(Gls)
2008–2014	Al Shabab		
2014–2016	Al Ittihad		
2015–2016	→ Dibba Al-Fujairah (loan)		
2016–2018	Al Dhafra		
2017	→ Ajman Club (loan)		
2017–2018	→ Dibba Al-Fujairah (loan)		
2018–2019	Hatta		
2019–2020	Al-Taawon		
2020–2021	HPC		
- * Club domestic league appearances and goals

Sanad Ali (Arabic: سند علي; born 13 November 1988) is an Emirati footballer. As of 2016 he played as a forward.
