= Bader Abdulrahman =

Emirati footballer (born 1983)

Personal information
- Full name: Bader Abdulrahman Andusalam
- Date of birth: 29 August 1983 (age 43)
- Place of birth: United Arab Emirates
- Height: 1.75 m (5 ft 9 in)
- Position: Right-back

Youth career
- Al-Ahli

Senior career*
Years	Team	Apps	(Gls)
2004–2007	Al-Ahli		
2007–2010	Al Shabab		
2010–2012	Al-Ahli		
2012–2013	Al-Wasl		
2013–2016	Al-Sharjah		
2016–2017	Hatta		
- * Club domestic league appearances and goals

Bader Abdurahman (Arabic:بدر عبد الرحمن) (born 29 August 1983) is an Emirati former professional footballer who played as a right-back for numerous football clubs before retiring at Hatta Club in 2017.
