= Ala Zhir =

Emirati footballer (born 2004)

Personal information
- Full name: Alaeddine Ben El Agamy El Zhir
- Date of birth: 7 March 2000 (age 26)
- Place of birth: Monastir, Tunisia
- Height: 1.89 m (6 ft 2 in)
- Position: Centre-back

Team information
- Current team: Al-Wahda
- Number: 21

Youth career
- –2018: Monastir

Senior career*
Years	Team	Apps	(Gls)
2018–2020	Monastir	28	(2)
2020–	Al-Wahda	93	(5)

International career^{‡}
2025–	United Arab Emirates	11	(0)
- * Club domestic league appearances and goals as of 16 March 2026 ‡ National team caps and goals as of 17 November 2026

Alaeddine "Ala" Ben El Agamy El Zhir (Arabic: علاء الدين زهير; born 7 March 2000) is a professional footballer who plays as a centre-back for UAE Pro League club Al-Wahda and the United Arab Emirates national team.

== Club career ==
Born in Monastir, Zhir was the youth product of local club US Monastir.

In January 2020, Zhir was transferred to UAE Pro League side Al-Wahda.

== International career ==
In December 2021, Zhir received a call-up to the Tunisia national team for the 2021 FIFA Arab Cup but later withdrew from the squad to focus at club football.

Zhir obtained United Arab Emirates passport in 2023, but was only eligible to represent United Arab Emirates national team in January 2025. He had first United Arab Emirates call-up in March 2025 for the 2026 World Cup qualifiers game against Iran and Korea DPR.
