= Humaid Abbas =

Emirati footballer (born 1988)

Personal information
- Full name: Humaid Abdulla Abbas Abdulla Al-Balushi
- Date of birth: 16 April 1988 (age 38)
- Place of birth: UAE
- Height: 1.83 m (6 ft 0 in)
- Position: Midfielder

Senior career*
Years	Team	Apps	(Gls)
2008–2013	Al Nasr		
2013–2016	Al Ahli		
2016–2019	Al-Wasl		
2019–2020	Al-Fujairah		
2020–2021	Hatta		
- * Club domestic league appearances and goals

Humaid Abbas (Arabic: حُمَيْد عَبْدُ اللهِ عَبَّاسُ عَبْدُ اللهِ الْبَلُوشِيُّ; born 16 April 1988) is an Emirati footballer. He played as a right-sided midfielder.
