= Mohammad Malallah =

Qatari footballer (born 1984)

Personal information
- Full name: Mohammad Malallah Al-Kubaisi
- Date of birth: 21 March 1984 (age 42)
- Place of birth: Qatar
- Position: Midfielder

Senior career*
Years	Team	Apps	(Gls)
2004–2015	Al-Arabi		
2015–2017	Al-Wakra		
- * Club domestic league appearances and goals

Mohammed Malallah (Arabic:محمد مال الله) (born 21 March 1984) is a Qatari footballer.
