= Ali Al-Ameri =

Emirati professional footballer (born 1989)

Personal information
- Full name: Ali Salem Ahmed Faraj Al-Ameri
- Date of birth: 7 January 1989 (age 37)
- Place of birth: United Arab Emirates
- Height: 1.84 m (6 ft 0 in)
- Position: Defender

Youth career
- Al-Jazira

Senior career*
Years	Team	Apps	(Gls)
2009–2014	Al-Jazira		
2012	→ Al-Nasr (loan)		
2014–2016	Al-Nasr		
2016–2017	Baniyas		
2018	Blyth Town		
2020	Masafi		
2020–2021	Masfout		
2022–2023	Baynounah		

International career
2011–2012	United Arab Emirates U23		
- * Club domestic league appearances and goals

Ali Salem Al-Ameri (Arabic: علي سالم أحمد فرج العامري; born 7 January 1989) is an Emirati professional footballer who plays as a defender.

He competed at the 2012 Summer Olympics with the United Arab Emirates U23 football team.

== Honours ==
United Arab Emirates

- Arabian Gulf Cup: 2013
