= Mohammed Jaber (footballer) =

Emirati footballer (born 1989)

Personal information
- Full name: Mohammed Jaber Nasser Al Hammadi
- Date of birth: 28 January 1989 (age 37)
- Place of birth: United Arab Emirates
- Height: 1.82 m (5 ft 11 1/2 in)
- Position: Defender

Youth career
- Baniyas

Senior career*
Years	Team	Apps	(Gls)
2008–2016	Baniyas	103	(2)
2016–2022	Shabab Al-Ahli	45	(3)
2017–2018	→ Al-Sharjah (loan)	15	(0)
2021–2022	→ Baniyas (loan)	9	(0)
2022–2023	Al Wasl	5	(0)
2023–2024	Ajman	3	(0)
- * Club domestic league appearances and goals

Mohammed Jaber (Arabic: محمد جابر; born 28 January 1989) is an Emirati footballer. He currently plays as a defender.
