= Ali Maatouk =

Libyan footballer (born 1988)

Personal information
- Full name: Ali Maatouk Omran Al-Snousi
- Date of birth: 4 January 1988 (age 38)
- Place of birth: Sabha, Libya
- Height: 1.76 m (5 ft 9 in)
- Position: Defender

Team information
- Current team: Al-Ahli Tripoli

Senior career*
Years	Team	Apps	(Gls)
2013–2018	Al-Hilal Benghazi		
2018	Al-Ahli Benghazi		
2018–	Al-Ahli Tripoli		
2019–2020	→ Stade Tunisien (loan)	18	(0)

International career^{‡}
2017–	Libya	15	(0)
- * Club domestic league appearances and goals as of 18:50, 22 January 2021 (UTC) ‡ National team caps and goals as of 18:50, 22 January 2021 (UTC)

Ali Maatouk Omran Al-Snousi (Arabic: علي معتوق عمران السنوسي; born 4 January 1988) is a Libyan professional footballer who plays as a defender for Al-Ahli Tripoli and the Libya national team.
