= Mubarak Saeed =

Emirati footballer (born 1991)

Personal information
- Full name: Mubarak Saeed Waleed Esmaeel Al-Shehhi
- Date of birth: 18 October 1991 (age 35)
- Place of birth: United Arab Emirates
- Height: 1.87 m (6 ft 2 in)
- Position: Defender

Youth career
- Emirates Club

Senior career*
Years	Team	Apps	(Gls)
2009–2015	Emirates Club		
2015–2021	Al Nasr	52	(0)
2020	→ Itthad Kalba (loan)	0	(0)
2022	Al-Taawon		

International career^{‡}
2019–	United Arab Emirates	2	(0)
- * Club domestic league appearances and goals ‡ National team caps and goals as of 23 March 2020

Mubarak Saeed Waleed Esmaeel Al-Shehhi (born 18 October 1991), or simply Mubarak Saeed (Arabic: مبارك سعيد), is an Emirati professional footballer who plays as a defender. He has been capped for the United Arab Emirates national team.
