= Fahman SCC =

Football Club in Yemen

Fahman Club
- Full name: Fahman Sports & Cultural Club
- Founded: 1969; 57 years ago
- Ground: Mudiyah Stadium; Mudiyah, Yemen
- League: Yemeni League

Fahman Sports & Cultural Club (Arabic: نادي فحمان الرياضي و الثقافي) is a Yemeni professional football club playing at the top national level. It is founded in 1969 and based in Mudiyah in the Abyan Governorate. Their home stadium is Mudiyah Stadium.

They competed in the 2023 Arab Club championship, playing against Horseed FC, Arta Solar 7 and US Monastir. They also were supposed to participate in the AFC Cup, before the AFC rejected the participation was rejected.

== See also ==
- List of football clubs in Yemen
