= Mudiyah =

- Location in Yemen
- Coordinates: 13°56′N 46°05′E
- Country: Yemen
- Governorate: Abyan
- Time zone: UTC+3 (Yemen Standard Time)

Mudiyah is a village in south-western Yemen. It is located in the Abyan Governorate. It was the historical capital of Dathina state.

In March 2017, Amqoz, in Mudiyah district, Abyan province, was the site of a United States UAV strike on a vehicle, which is believed to have killed four members of Al-Qaeda in the Arabian Peninsula.
