= Al Wahda FC =

Association football club in United Arab Emirates

Al-Wahda FC نادي الوحدة لكرة القدم
- Full name: Al-Wahda Football Club
- Nicknames: The Clarets (الكلاريت); The Maroons (العنابي)
- Founded: 1984; 42 years ago
- Ground: Al Nahyan Stadium
- Capacity: 15,894
- Owner: Diab Bin Zayed Al Nahyan
- Chairman: Rashid Bin Diab Al Nahyan
- Head coach: Péricles Chamusca
- League: UAE Pro League
- 2025–26: UAE Pro League, 5th
- Website: www.alwahda-sc.com
Home colours	Away colours

Al-Wahda Football Club (Arabic: نادي الوحدة لكرة القدم, romanized: al-waḥda, lit. 'Union') is an Emirati professional football club based in Abu Dhabi, that competes in the UAE Pro League. The club was founded in 1984 and plays its home games at the Al Nahyan Stadium. The club's colours are maroon, navy blue and white.

== History ==
=== Foundation ===
The first team created in Abu Dhabi was Al-Ahli in 1966, followed respectively by Al-Ittihad in 1968, Al-Falah and Al-Wahda in 1969. In 1974, a decision was made by the Minister of youth and sport to create Abu Dhabi SC by merging Al-Ittihad and Al-Wahda on 13 March 1974, and to create Al-Emirates SC by merging Al-Ahli and Al-Falah on 3 June 1974. In 1984, Abu Dhabi SC and Al-Emirates SC merged to create Al-Wahda FC.

=== Modern era ===
In 1999, Al Wahda won their maiden UAE League title with 8 points ahead of their rivals Al Ain. In 2018, Al Wahda changed its official logo as part of a new club redesign.

== Honours ==
=== Leagues ===
UAE Pro League: 4

- Champions: 1998–99, 2000–01, 2004–05, 2009–10

UAE Division One: 2

- Champions: 1976–77, 1984–85

=== Cups ===
UAE President's Cup: 2

- Champions: 1999–2000, 2016–17

UAE Federation Cup: 3

- Champions: 1986, 1995, 2001

UAE League Cup: 4

- Champions: 2015–16, 2017–18, 2023–24, 2025–26

UAE Super Cup: 4

- Champions: 2002, 2011, 2017, 2018

=== Regional ===
Qatar–UAE Challenge Cup:1

- Champions: 2024–25

UAE–Qatar Challenge Shield:1

- Champions: 2025–26

== Home stadium ==
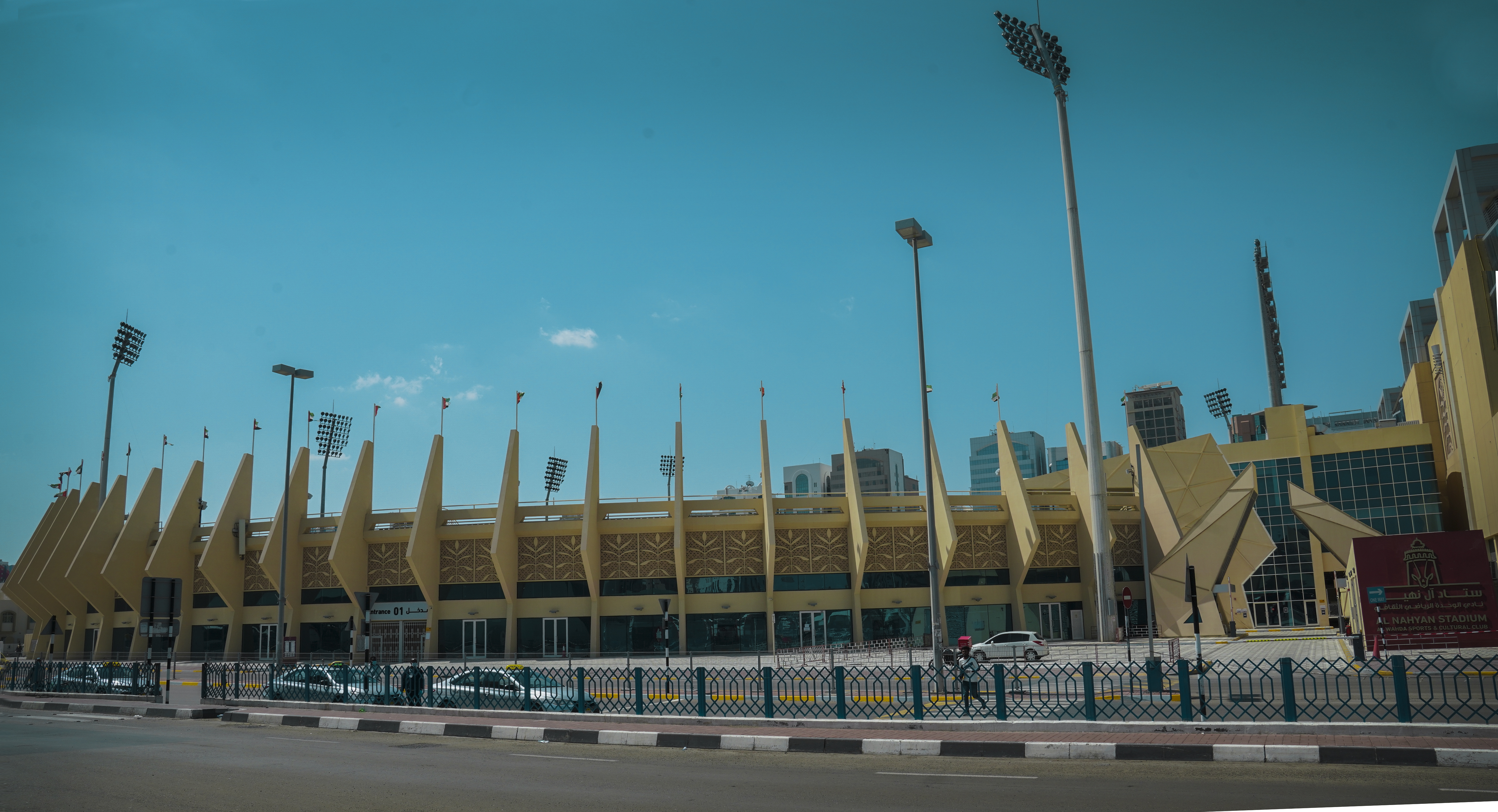
An outer view of the Al Nahyan Stadium

The Al Nahyan Stadium is the home of Al Wahda. Built in 1995 and renovated for the 2019 AFC Asian Cup, it seats 15,895 supporters. It lays beside Al Wahda Mall, on Ahmed Bin Khalaf Al Otaiba Street, and is hence located in the centre of the city of Abu Dhabi.

== Performance in AFC competitions ==
Al Wahda has been qualifying for Asian competitions since the late 90s. They have made multiple appearances in the AFC Champions League. Al Wahda FC made two appearances in the Asian Cup Winners Cup, in the 1998–99 and the 2000–01 seasons, reaching the first round on both occasions.

Al Wahda's season-by-season record in international competitions
^{1} Group stage. Highest-ranked eliminated team in case of qualification, lowest-ranked qualified team in case of elimination.
Arab Club Champions Cup
Season	Preliminary stages	Round of 32	Round of 16	Quarter-finals	Semi-finals	Final
2017				(Egypt) Al Ahly^{1}		
2023	(Lebanon) Bourj	(Morocco) ASFAR	(Algeria) CR Belouizdad^{1}	(Saudi Arabia) Al Shabab		
FIFA Club World Cup
Season	Preliminary stages				Semi-finals / Fifth match	Final / Third match
2010			(Papua New Guinea) Hekari United	(South Korea) Seongnam	(Mexico) Pachuca	

Season	AFC Champions League
Asian Club Championship
1999–00	First round
2000-01	Did not qualify
2001–02	Group stage
AFC Champions League
2002-03	Did not qualify
2004	Quarter-finals
2005	Did not qualify
2006	Group stage
2007	Semi-finals
2008	Group stage
2009	Did not qualify
2010	Round of 32
2011	Round of 32
2012	Did not qualify
2013	Did not qualify
2014	Did not qualify
2015	Play-offs
2016	Did not qualify
2017	Round of 32
2018	Round of 32
2019	Round of 16
2020	Withdrew
2021	Quarter-finals
2022	Did not qualify
2023-24	Did not qualify
AFC Champions League Elite
2024–25	Did not qualify
2025–26	Qualified

== Players ==
As of 8 September, 2026 UAE Pro-League:

Note: Flags indicate national team as defined under FIFA eligibility rules; some limited exceptions apply. Players may hold more than one non-FIFA nationality.

No.	Pos.	Nation	Player
2	DF	UAE	Mansour Burghash
3	DF	UAE	Lucas Pimenta
4	DF	ARG	Lautaro Montenegro
5	DF	UAE	Ala Zhir
6	MF	IRI	Mohammad Ghorbani
7	FW	UAE	Caio Canedo
8	MF	SLO	Adam Čerin
11	FW	ARG	Facundo Kruspzky
12	MF	UAE	Abdulla Hamad
13	DF	UAE	Hazaa Shehab
15	MF	IRI	Mobin Dehghan
17	MF	ARG	Gerónimo Rivera
19	FW	ENG	Asher Agbinone
20	FW	BEL	Christian Benteke
22	DF	VEN	Renné Rivas

No.	Pos.	Nation	Player
23	GK	PAR	Facundo Lirussi
25	MF	BRA	Jadsom
26	GK	UAE	Hazaa Ammar
30	DF	NGR	Favour Ogbu
32	DF	POR	Guga
35	DF	TUN	Amenallah Majhed
36	GK	UAE	Zayed Al-Hammadi
38	MF	ESP	Arnau Pradas
44	MF	MLI	Moussa Diarra
64	DF	UAE	Rashed Issam
66	MF	UAE	Gastón Suárez
70	FW	SYR	Omar Khribin
80	FW	YEM	Abdulqader Al-Somhi
94	MF	MLI	Brahima Diarra

=== Out on loan ===
Note: Flags indicate national team as defined under FIFA eligibility rules; some limited exceptions apply. Players may hold more than one non-FIFA nationality.

No.	Pos.	Nation	Player
44	MF	EGY	Anas Osama (on loan to Dibba Al-Hisn)

Players with Multiple Nationalities

- (United Arab Emirates) (Argentina) Facundo Kruspzky
- (United Arab Emirates) (Argentina) Gastón Suárez

== Coaching staff ==
Position	Name
Head Coach	(Brazil) Péricles Chamusca
Assistant Coach	(United Arab Emirates) Abdullslam Jumaa
Goalkeeper Coach	(Brazil) Christopher Sales
Conditioning Coach	(Portugal) Helder Fernandes Soares
Chief Analyst	(Brazil) Tiago Albuquerque Freire
Club Doctor	(Tunisia) Waleed Al-Shikh
Physiotherapist	(Serbia) Ninad Martino (Brazil) Rodrigo de Queiroz Aires
Masseur	(Croatia) Božo Sinkovic (Serbia) Vladimir Harfman

== Managerial history ==
^{*} Served as caretaker coach.

Name	Nat.	From	To	Ref.
Helmy Toulan	(Egypt)	1979	1984	
Heshmat Mohajerani	(Iran)	1984	1986	
Slobodan Halilović	(Federal Republic of Yugoslavia)	1991	1992	
Mahmoud El-Gohary	(Egypt)	1995	1996	
Jo Bonfrère	(Netherlands)	1998	1999	
Ruud Krol	(Netherlands)	1999	1999	
Dimitri Davidovic	(Belgium)	1999	2000	
Rinus Israël	(Netherlands)	2000	2001	
Jo Bonfrère	(Netherlands)	2001	February 2002	
Arie van der Zouwen*	(Netherlands)	2002	2002	
Cemşir Muratoğlu	(Turkey)	2002	2003	
Rolf Fringer	(Austria)	14 March 2003	30 June 2003	
Rolland Courbis	(France)	1 July 2003	30 November 2003	
Rinus Israël	(Netherlands)	1 December 2003	30 June 2004	
Ahmad Abdel-Halim	(Egypt)	2004	2005	
Reiner Hollmann	(Germany)	1 July 2005	3 April 2006	
Richard Tardy	(France)	2006	4 August 2006	
Horst Köppel	(Germany)	5 August 2006	11 October 2006	
Jo Bonfrère	(Netherlands)	13 December 2007	10 December 2008	
Josef Hickersberger	(Austria)	10 December 2008	1 June 2010	
László Bölöni	(Romania)	29 May 2010	2 September 2010	
Tite	(Brazil)	31 August 2010	19 October 2010	
Josef Hickersberger	(Austria)	22 October 2010	30 June 2012	
Branko Ivanković	(Croatia)	20 May 2012	28 April 2013	
Josef Hickersberger	(Austria)	28 April 2013	15 July 2013	
Karel Jarolím	(Czech Republic)	15 July 2013	9 November 2013	
José Peseiro	(Portugal)	11 November 2013	11 January 2015	
Sami Al-Jaber	(Saudi Arabia)	11 January 2015	19 May 2015	
Javier Aguirre	(Mexico)	18 June 2015	20 May 2017	
Laurențiu Reghecampf	(Romania)	3 July 2017	25 November 2018	
Henk ten Cate	(Netherlands)	7 December 2018	26 May 2019	
Maurice Steijn	(Netherlands)	9 June 2019	17 October 2019	
Manuel Jiménez	(Spain)	17 October 2019	18 July 2020	
Mark Wotte	(Netherlands)	18 July 2020	8 September 2020	
Vuk Rašović	(Serbia)	8 September 2020	12 March 2021	
Henk ten Cate	(Netherlands)	13 March 2021	25 October 2021	
Grégory Dufrennes	(France)	26 October 2021	3 June 2022	
Carlos Carvalhal	(Portugal)	1 July 2022	2 October 2022	
Manuel Jiménez	(Spain)	5 October 2022	12 March 2023	
Arno Buitenweg*	(Netherlands)	13 March 2023	17 June 2023	
Pitso Mosimane	(South Africa)	18 June 2023	10 November 2023	
Arno Buitenweg*	(Netherlands)	10 November 2023	5 January 2024	
Goran Tufegdžić	(Serbia)	5 January 2024	5 July 2024	
Ronny Deila	(Norway)	5 July 2024	18 December 2024	
Darko Milanič	(Slovenia)	18 December 2024	20 June 2025	
José Morais	(Portugal)	20 June 2025	12 December 2025	
Dimas*	(Portugal)	13 December 2025	2 February 2026	
Darko Milanič	(Slovenia)	3 February 2026	18 April 2026	
Hassan Al-Abdooli*	(United Arab Emirates)	18 April 2026	19 May 2026	
Péricles Chamusca	(Brazil)	6 June 2026	present	

== Pro-League record ==
Season	Level	No. of teams	Position	President's Cup	League Cup
2008–09	1	12	4th	Semi-Finals	Runner-ups
2009–10	1	12	1st	Semi-Finals	Semi-Finals
2010–11	1	12	5th	Runner-ups	Semi-Finals
2011–12	1	12	6th	Semi-Finals	First Round
2012–13	1	14	7th	Semi-Finals	Semi-Finals
2013–14	1	14	2nd	Quarter-Finals	First Round
2014–15	1	14	4th	Round of 16	First Round
2015–16	1	14	3rd	Round of 16	Champions
2016–17	1	14	5th	Champions	First Round
2017–18	1	12	2nd	Semi-Finals	Champions
2018–19	1	14	3rd	Round of 16	Runner-ups
2019–20^{a}	1	14	5th	Round of 16	Quarter-Finals
2020–21	1	14	7th	Round of 16	First Round
2021–22	1	14	3rd	Runner-ups	Semi-Finals
2022–23	1	14	3rd	Preliminary Round	Quarter-Finals
2023–24	1	14	5th	Round of 16	Champions
2024–25	1	14	5th		
2025–26	1	14	5th		

_{Notes 2019–20 UAE football season was cancelled due to the COVID-19 pandemic in the United Arab Emirates}

== See also ==
- List of football clubs in the United Arab Emirates
