= Al-Balushi =

Ethnic diaspora group mainly living in the GCC

البلوشي
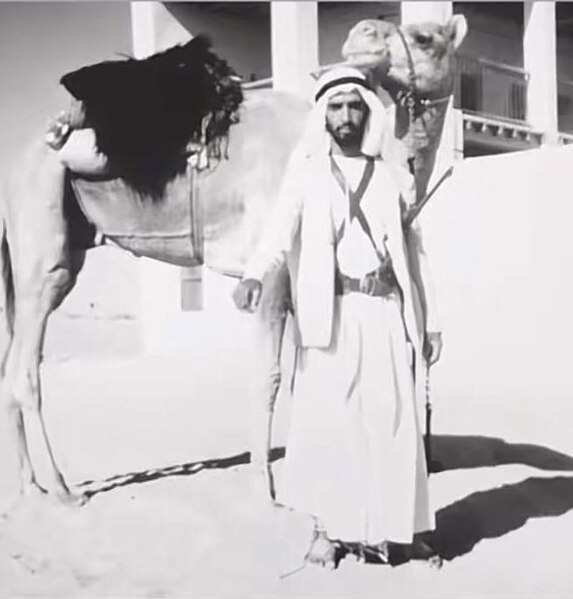
- Emirati political advisor Ahmed Bin Mahmoud Al Blooshi in Al Ain in 1960.

Total population
- 1,196,000 (2018)

Related ethnic groups
- Baloch diaspora

Al-Balushi (Arabic: البلوشي; alternatively Baloushi, Balooshi, Bloushi, Blooshi or Beloshi) is a tribal surname common in the Arab states of the Gulf countries (predominantly Oman, the United Arab Emirates, Kuwait, Bahrain, Qatar, Eastern Saudi Arabia and Southern Iraq). The surname is an Arabized form of the term Balochi or Baluchi (Note: Balochi: بلو چی, local definition: of, or related to Balochistan.), typically denoting Baloch ancestry from Balochistan.

Many people carrying this surname trace their ancestral origins to Balochistan — a region in modern-day southwestern Pakistan, southern Afghanistan and southeastern Iran. Their ancestors primarily came from the Makran coast in the 18th century. The majority of them speak Arabic, while some retain their native Balochi language. They are mainly Sunni Muslims.

== Al-Balushis in Oman ==
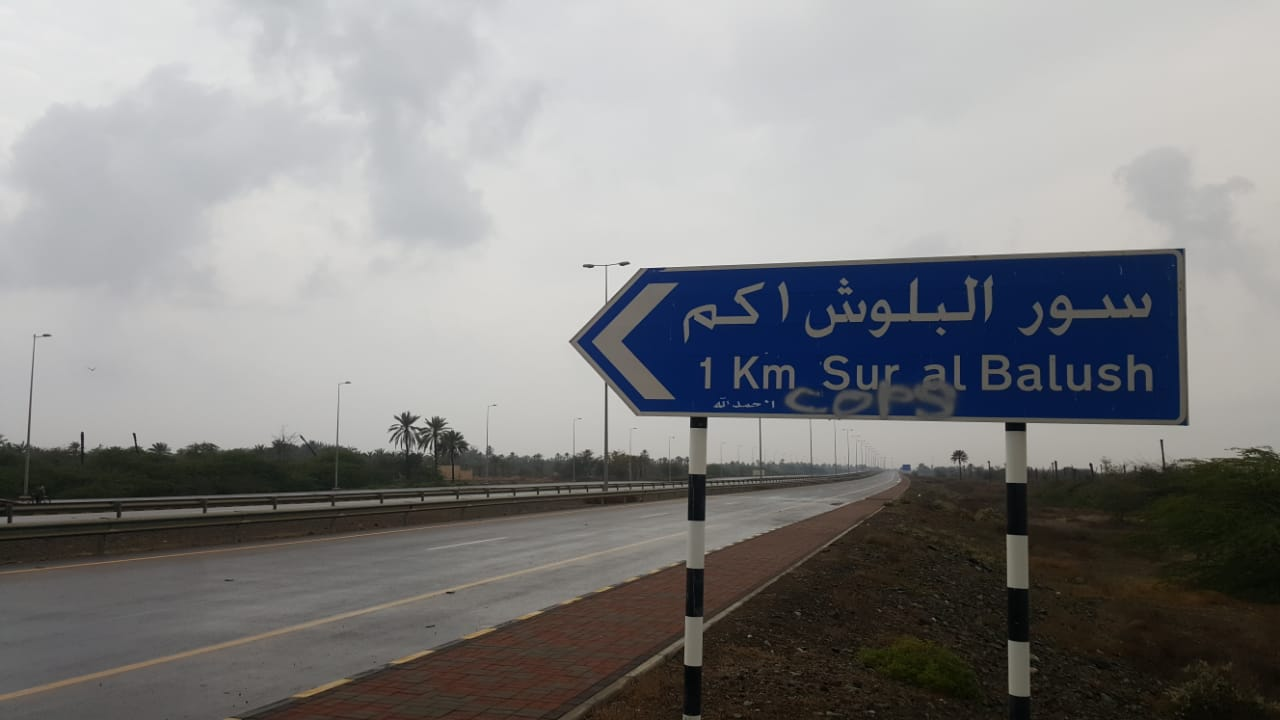
Sur Al Balush, In Shinas Wilayat, Sultanate Of Oman.

Oman is home to one of the largest Al-Balushi populations outside Pakistan and Iran. It is estimated that Al-Balushis make up 35% of its population.

The presence of Al-Balushis in Oman dates back centuries, rooted in the connection between Makran (present-day Pakistan) and Oman. These regions shared economic and political ties, particularly through Gwadar Port, which historically served as a crucial link between Arabia, South Asia, and colonial European powers.

Gwadar was under Omani rule for nearly two centuries, initially governed by Sultan bin Ahmad and later remaining part of the Omani Sultanate, until 1958. That year, Sultan Said bin Taimur sold the territory to Pakistan for $3 million, officially transferring control of Gwadar.

== People ==
Notable people with this surname include:

=== Saudis ===
- Reem Al-Beloshi — Saudi footballer
- Rayan Al-Bloushi — Saudi footballer

=== Qataris ===
- Talal Al-Bloushi — Qatari footballer
- Mubarak Al Beloushi — Qatari footballer
- Fahad Khalfan Al Bloushi — Qatari footballer
- Mohammed Gholam Al Baloushi - Qatari footballer
- Abdullah Balideh Al Baloushi — Qatari football referee
- Waleed Hamzah Al Bloushi — Qatari footballer

=== Bahrainis ===
- Fatima bint Mohammed Al Balooshi — Bahraini politician
- Salah Abdul Rasool Al Blooshi — Bahraini Guantanamo detainee

=== Omanis ===
- Hazza Al Balushi — Omani Quran reciter
- Azan Al-Balushi — Omani footballer
- Hamed Al-Balushi — Omani footballer
- Jamal Nabi Al-Balushi — Omani footballer
- Mohammed Al-Balushi — Omani footballer
- Muheeb Al-Balushi — Omani footballer
- Wadha Al-Balushi — Omani sports shooter
- Ali Anwar Al-Balushi — Omani sprinter
- Yousuf Al Balushi — Omani cricketer
- Hamed Al-Balushi — Omani footballer

=== Kuwaitis ===
- Abdullah Al-Buloushi — Kuwaiti footballer
- Mai Al Balushi — Kuwaiti actress
- Maram Al Balushi — Kuwaiti singer and actress
- Ammar al-Balushi — Kuwaiti-Pakistani Guantanamo detainee
- Mubarak Al Beloushi — Kuwaiti footballer
- Ahmad Al Beloushi — Kuwaiti footballer
- Ali Al-Balushi — Kuwaiti boxer

=== Emiratis ===
- Ahmed Bin Mahmoud Al Blooshi — Emirati political advisor
- Adeeb Al-Balushi — Emirati Inventor
- Mohammed Abbas Al Blooshi — Emirati footballer
- Issa Ali Al-Bloushi — Emirati footballer
- Mohammed Jumaa Al-Blooshi — Emirati footballer
- Khalid Abdulla Al-Blooshi — Emirati footballer
- Mohammed Abdullah Al-Balushi — Emirati footballer
- Khalid Al-Baloushi — Emirati footballer
- Walid Abbas Al-Balushi — Emirati footballer
- Hamad Al-Balooshi — Emirati footballer
- Mansoor Al-Baloushi — Emirati footballer
- Ali Salmeen Al-Blooshi — Emirati footballer
- Ayesha Al-Balooshi — Emirati weightlifter
- Ali Mohamed Al-Balooshi — Emirati middle-distance runner
- Jassem Yaqoub Al Blooshi — Emirati footballer

== See also ==
- Baloch people
- Baloch diaspora
- Baloch people in Iran
- Baloch people in India
- Baloch people in the United Arab Emirates
- Omani Baloch
