= Baloch people in the United Arab Emirates =

امارات متحدہ عرب مردم بلوچ البلوش في دولة الإمارات العربية المتحدة
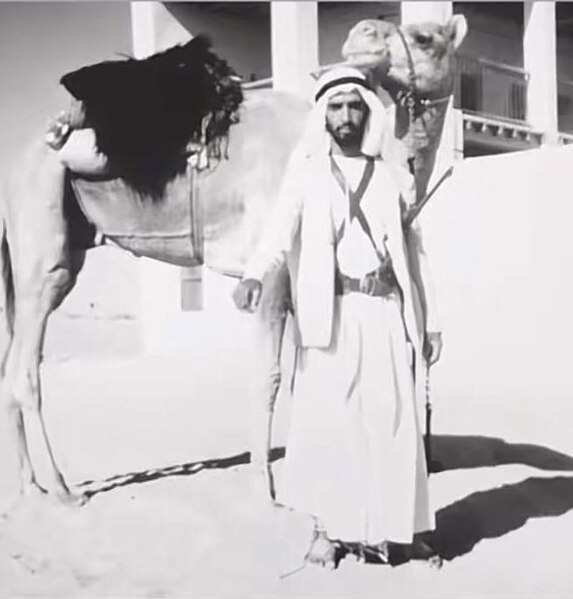
- Ahmed bin Mahmood Al-Baloushi in the Trucial Coast, 1960

Total population
- 15,000-30,000 (as citizens)

Regions with significant populations
- United Arab Emirates (Sharjah · Dubai · Ras Al Khaimah · Ajman)

Languages
- Balochi · Arabic; Persian, widely spoken as second/third languages

Religion
- Islam

Related ethnic groups
- Iranian Baloch · Omani Baloch · Ajam Emiratis · Emiratis · Gulf Baloch · Baloch diaspora · Baloch people

The Baloch people in the United Arab Emirates are Emiratis of Baloch descent.

Individuals from this national component use the surname “Al-Baloushi.” Their ancestors migrated from regions of Iranian Balochistan, including Makran, Biyaban and Jask to areas of Sharjah, Ras Al Khaimah, Dubai, and Ajman along the Trucial Coast during the 19th century.

They are related to Omani Baloch people and to Ajam Emiratis, a term referring to Emiratis of Iranian ancestry.

== Culture ==
The Baloch speak Balochi. The Gulf dialect of Arabic is also natively spoken by those who have been settled in the region for generations.

The Kumzarah subsection which forms the entire Persian element of the Bani Hadiyah branch of the Shihuh tribe in the Northern Emirates speaks a dialect similar to the language spoken by the Baluch.

== Geography ==
The Iranian province of Baluchistan lies across the Strait of Hormuz from the United Arab Emirates, which occupies the south-eastern part of the Arabian Peninsula and has coastlines along both the Persian Gulf and the Gulf of Oman.

== History ==
In 1879, Baluch troops were stationed at Fujairah Fort after it was recaptured by Shaikh Salim bin Sultan Al Qasimi of Sharjah during the suppression of a local uprising against Sharjah’s authority. They served as the fort’s garrison to maintain control over Fujairah, while some captured prisoners were transported to the island of Abu Musa.

At the beginning of the twentieth century, Lorimer mentioned in his Geographical Gazetteer the presence of approximately 1,400 Baluchis living in the Trucial States, distributed among the sheikhdoms of Sharjah (Kalba), Ras Al Khaimah, and Dubai. Most were engaged in trade and maritime occupations, such as fishing, while some served in military roles. He noted the Baluchis of the Trucial States are connected to the broader Baluchi populations in neighboring Oman and Persian Makran, as well as smaller Baloch populations in Persia, Mohammareh, Kuwait, Bahrain, Qatar, Al Ahsa, and Turkish Iraq.

The Al Mariyah Al Gharbiyyah tower in Liwa was built by a Baluch builder in 1912 on the orders of sheikh Hamdan bin Zayed bin Khalifa.

In 1937, the Baloch lived in Kalba on the east coast of the Trucial States when its bid for independence was successful with Persian (Ajam) and Arab tribes such as the Naqabi, Sharqiyin, Kunud and Abadilah.

== People ==
Emirati citizens who are considered of Baloch descent, as they bear the surname Al-Baloushi, regardless of their specific background.

=== Sportspeople ===
- Ali Salmeen, Emirati footballer
- Khalid Al-Baloushi, Emirati footballer
- Hamad Al-Blooshi, Emirati footballer
- Mohammed Abbas, Emirati footballer
- Walid Abbas, Emirati footballer
- Yaqoub Al-Blooshi, Emirati footballer
- Mansour Al-Blooshi, Emirati footballer
- Ayesha Al-Blooshi, Emirati weightlifter
- Khalid Abdulla, Emirati footballer
- Issa Ali, Emirati footballer
- Jassim Yaqoub, Emirati footballer
- Ali Al-Balooshi, Emirati footballer
- Mahmoud Nader Al-Baloushi, Emirati tennis player

=== Politicians ===
- Ahmed bin Mahmoud Al Blooshi, Emirati political advisor

== See also ==
- Omani Baloch
- Ajam Emiratis
- Al-Balushi
- Iranians in the United Arab Emirates
