= Maritime history of Pakistan =

Pakistan's maritime history centres around its Indian Ocean coastline in Sindh and Balochistan.

== Ancient era ==
Baloch sailors have played a significant role in Indian Ocean trade networks. Sindhi cities such as Mohenjo-daro and Barbarikon grew significantly from this trade as well. The Indus River also facilitated exchanges.

== Medieval era ==
Banbhore, a Sindhi city that was historically near the sea, was greatly expanded after the early Arab Muslim conquests.

Almost 30% of Omanis are of Baloch origin. They have been in the country for centuries, and contribute to positive Oman–Pakistan relations.

== Contemporary era ==
Before the 1948 Indian annexation of the princely state of Junagadh, Pakistan and Junagadh's Nawab reasoned that Junagadh was close enough to Pakistan, being linked by a sea route (Veraval to Karachi), to become part of Pakistan.: 'Jinnah assured Bhutto that he would not allow Junagadh to be “starved out or tyrannized and that Veraval was not far from Karachi.”'</ref> Sir Creek continues to be party to a border dispute between India and Pakistan, with maritime trespassing taking place in the area.

In the early years, the Pakistani Navy helped in setting up shipping services and improving port sites such as the Chalna Port (now Bangladesh's Port of Mongla).

=== Post-1971 ===
In 1974, the Pakistan National Shipping Corporation (PNSC) was formed, with the shipping industry being nationalised. From that point onwards, the sea-going capacity of Pakistan has declined. Despite 95% of Pakistan's trade being conducted through the sea, there has been a lack of awareness and focus on developing the nation's maritime potential. Territorial security threats on land have been a factor in the military paying less attention to the ocean, with Oman's navy size surpassing Pakistan's.

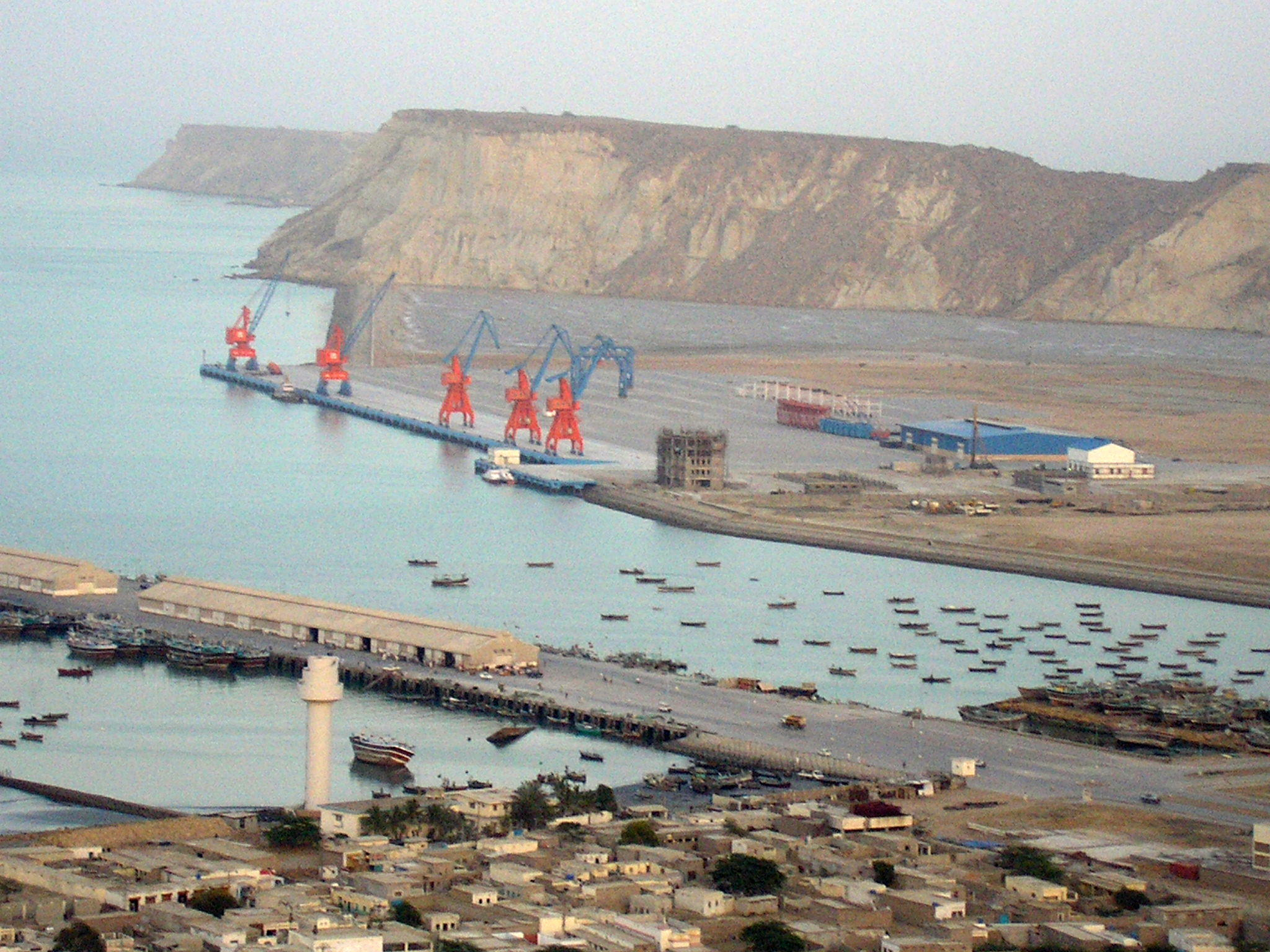
Gwadar Port

Balochistan and its Gwadar Port have become important for Pakistan's modern maritime trade, with India and the United States concerned around Chinese involvement in the form of the China–Pakistan Economic Corridor.

During the 2025 India–Pakistan standoff, maritime trade was suspended between the two nations.
