= Hatta Club =

Emirati sports club

Hatta
- Full name: Hatta Sports Club
- Nickname: Tornado
- Founded: 1981; 45 years ago
- Ground: Hamdan Bin Rashid Stadium, Hatta, UAE
- Capacity: 5,000
- Chairman: Saeed Bin Hamdan Bin Rashid Al Maktoum
- Head coach: Aleksandar Ilić
- League: UAE First Division League
- 2025–26: 1st (Promoted)
- Website: www.hattaclub.ae
Home colours	Away colours

Hatta Club (Arabic: نادي حتا الرياضي) is a sports club based in Hatta in the Emirate of Dubai, UAE. It is most widely known for its professional football team, which currently competes in the UAE Pro League. Founded in 1981, the club’s football team plays its home matches at the Hamdan Bin Rashid Stadium, which has a capacity of 5,000 spectators.

== Honours ==
=== Domestic ===
- UAE First Division League
  - Champions (3): 2015–16, 2022–23, 2025–26

== Pro-League record ==
Season	Lvl.	Tms.	Pos.	President's Cup	League Cup
2008–09	2	16	6th	Preliminary Round	—
2009–10	2	8	7th	Preliminary Round	—
2010–11	3	10	4th	Preliminary Round	—
2011–12	3	8	1st	Preliminary Round	—
2012–13	2	14	13th	Preliminary Round	—
2013–14	2	13	8th	Preliminary Round	—
2014–15	2	11	4th	Preliminary Round	—
2015–16	2	9	1st	Preliminary Round	—
2016–17	1	14	10th	Semi-Finals	First Round
2017–18	1	12	12th	Round of 16	Quarter-Finals
2018–19	2	10	2nd	Round of 16	—
2019–20^{a}	1	14	13th	Round of 16	First Round
2020–21	1	14	14th	Round of 16	First Round
2021–22	2	15	6th	Round of 16	—
2022–23	2	17	1st	Preliminary Round	—
2023–24	1	14	14th	Round of 16	First Round

_{Notes 2019–20 UAE football season was cancelled due to the COVID-19 pandemic in the United Arab Emirates.}

Key

- Pos. = Position
- Tms. = Number of teams
- Lvl. = League

== Current squad ==
As of UAE Pro League:

Note: Flags indicate national team as defined under FIFA eligibility rules; some limited exceptions apply. Players may hold more than one non-FIFA nationality.

No.	Pos.	Nation	Player
2	DF	UAE	Omar Saeed
3	DF	UAE	Saeed Suleiman (on loan to Shabab Al Ahli)
4	DF	UAE	Abdullah Jassim
5	MF	UAE	Khalid Mubarak
7	MF	UAE	Rashid Mubarak
8	MF	CRO	Mateo Andačić
10	FW	MAR	Ayman Rchoq
11	MF	TUN	Firas Ben Larbi
12	MF	UAE	Abdullah Kazim
15	MF	MLI	Cheikh Keita
18	DF	UAE	Hamad Al-Badwawi
19	FW	UAE	Saif Mubarak
21	MF	UAE	Mansoor Al-Badwawi
22	GK	UAE	Marzooq Al-Badwawi
24	DF	OMA	Hamad Al-Baloushi
26	MF	UAE	Hassan Ibrahim Saqer
27	MF	UAE	Atiq Walid
28	MF	UAE	Hamdan Humaid
33	DF	BRA	Bruno Leonardo
35	DF	UAE	Khalid Abdulla

No.	Pos.	Nation	Player
44	GK	UAE	Ibrahim Essa
49	DF	CIV	Jocelyn Doumbia
50	GK	UAE	Saeed Al-Mesmari
52	DF	BRA	Kaua Bastian (on loan to Al Ain)
55	DF	LBN	Mohamad El Housseini
60	MF	MLI	Drissa Coulibaly (on loan to Shabab Al Ahli)
74	DF	EGY	Adham Khalid
77	FW	GAM	Ebrima Jeng
80	FW	OMA	Mohammed Al-Marbuii
88	MF	UAE	Khalid Al-Baloushi
90	GK	UAE	Ahmed Al-Badwawi
99	FW	SEN	Bernard Faye
—	DF	MAR	Saad Farid
—	MF	SRB	Mateja Radonjic
—	MF	ARG	Gerónimo Poblete
—	MF	TUN	Ghaith Ouahabi
—	MF	ESP	Pablo Sánchez
—	MF	BRA	Khauan Schlickmann (on loan to Al Ain)
—	FW	BRA	Pedrinho
—	FW	TUN	Seifeddine Jaziri

== Technical staff ==
Position	Staff
Head coach	(Serbia) Aleksandar Ilić
Assistant coach	(Serbia) Dejan Trickovic (Serbia) Ivan Ilić (United Arab Emirates) Waleed Obaid
Goalkeeper coach	(Serbia) Ivan Randjelovic
Fitness coach	(Serbia) Vladimir Procikevic
Analyst	(United Arab Emirates) Wael Al-Sharafli

== See also ==
- List of football clubs in the United Arab Emirates
