= Foreign relations of Oman =

When Sultan Qaboos bin Said Al Said assumed power in 1970, Oman had limited contacts with the outside world, including neighbouring Arab states. A special treaty relationship permitted the United Kingdom close involvement in Oman's civil and military affairs. Ties with the United Kingdom remained very close throughout Sultan Qaboos' reign, along with strong ties to the United States.

== Political overview ==
Since 1969, Oman has pursued a moderate foreign policy and expanded its diplomatic relations dramatically. It supported the 1979 Camp David Accords and was one of three Arab League states, along with Somalia and Sudan, which did not break relations with Egypt after the signing of the Egypt–Israel peace treaty in 1979. During the Persian Gulf crisis, Oman assisted the United Nations coalition effort. Oman has developed close ties to its neighbours; it joined the six-member Gulf Cooperation Council when it was established in 1980.

Oman has traditionally supported Middle East peace initiatives, as it did those in 1983. In April 1994, Oman hosted the plenary meeting of the Water Working Group of the peace process, the first Persian Gulf state to do so.

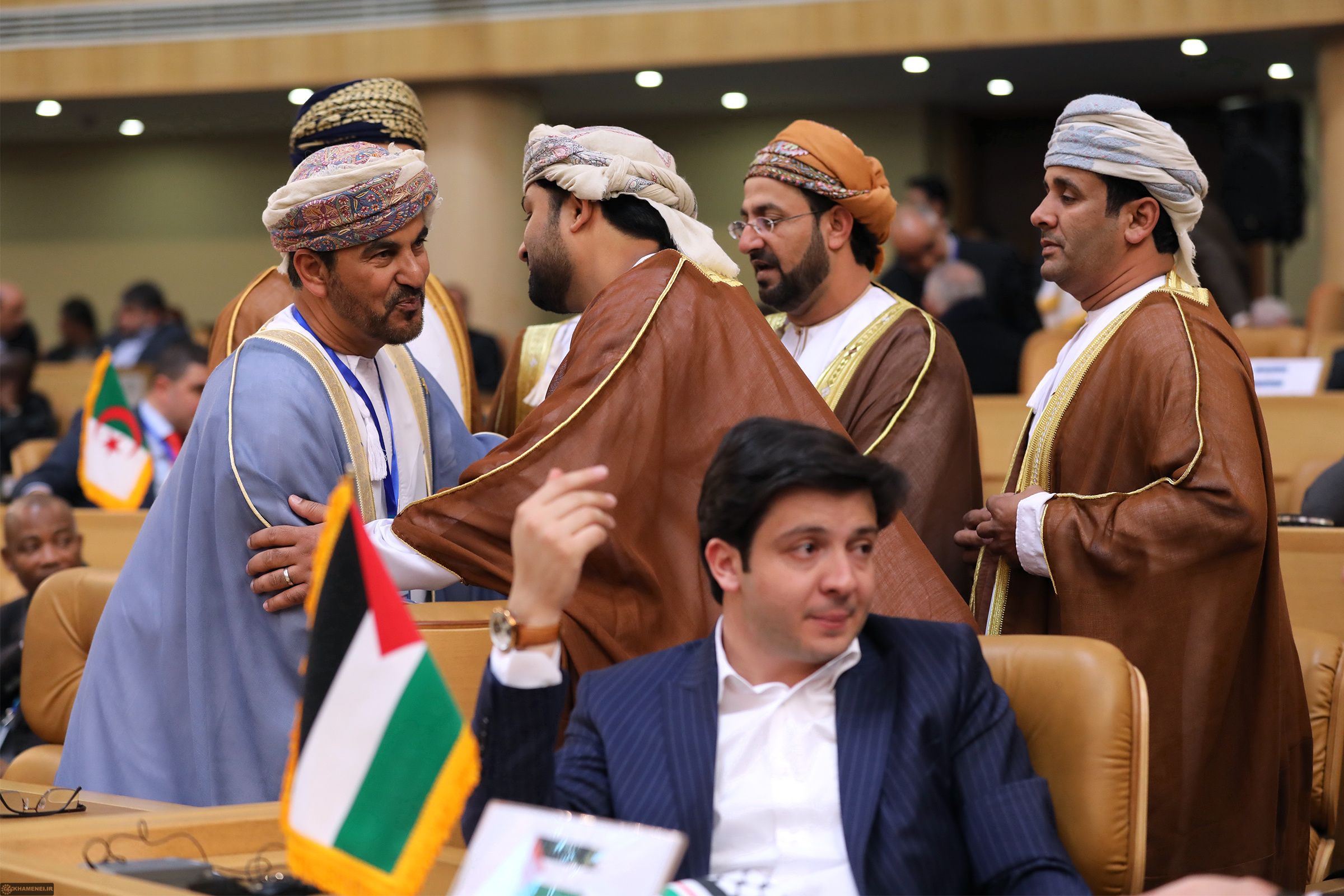
The Sixth International Conference in support of the Palestinian Intifada, Tehran, 21 February 2017

During the Cold War period, Oman avoided relations with communist countries because of the communist support for the insurgency in Dhofar. In recent years, Oman has undertaken diplomatic initiatives in the Central Asian republics, particularly in Kazakhstan, where it is involved in a joint oil pipeline project. In addition, Oman maintains good relations with Iran, its north-eastern neighbor across the Gulf of Oman, and the two countries regularly exchange delegations. Oman is an active member in international and regional organizations, notably the Arab League and the Gulf Cooperation Council. Its foreign policy is overseen by its Foreign Ministry.

In 2023, Oman established foreign relations with the Holy See, with a signing ceremony taking place at the headquarters of the Sultanate's Permanent Mission to the UN in New York City.

== International disputes ==
The northern boundary with the United Arab Emirates has not been bilaterally defined; the northern section in the Musandam Peninsula is an administrative boundary.

== Diplomatic relations ==
List of countries which Oman maintains diplomatic relations with:

#	Country	Date
1	United Kingdom	2 May 1971
2	India	25 July 1971
3	Iran	26 August 1971
4	Pakistan	15 October 1971
5	Saudi Arabia	14 December 1971
6	Tunisia	December 1971
7	Kuwait	1 January 1972
8	Netherlands	1 January 1972
9	France	5 January 1972
10	Italy	26 January 1972
11	Egypt	20 March 1972
12	United States	17 April 1972
13	Japan	8 May 1972
14	Germany	16 May 1972
15	Jordan	11 June 1972
16	Bahrain	13 June 1972
17	Qatar	27 June 1972
18	Spain	10 November 1972
19	Lebanon	2 January 1973
20	Morocco	10 March 1973
21	Finland	1 April 1973
22	United Arab Emirates	1 April 1973
23	Turkey	18 June 1973
24	Switzerland	12 September 1973
25	Greece	1 October 1973
26	Austria	18 December 1973
27	Canada	2 February 1974
28	Sweden	15 March 1974
29	South Korea	28 March 1974
30	Romania	1 May 1974
31	Serbia	4 May 1974
32	Yemen	12 May 1974
33	Belgium	22 May 1974
34	Argentina	18 June 1974
35	Brazil	3 July 1974
36	Algeria	September 1974
37	Malta	4 November 1974
38	Bangladesh	18 December 1974
39	Burundi	28 February 1975
40	Mexico	31 July 1975
41	Senegal	25 December 1975
42	Iraq	7 January 1976
43	Chile	23 February 1976
44	Kenya	4 March 1976
45	Denmark	10 April 1976
46	Nepal	21 January 1977
47	Sudan	17 March 1977
48	Djibouti	16 November 1977
49	Indonesia	5 December 1977
50	China	25 May 1978
51	Democratic Republic of the Congo	1978
52	Cyprus	1978
53	Mali	2 March 1979
54	Portugal	26 October 1979
55	Gambia	4 February 1980
56	Norway	15 April 1980
57	Thailand	30 July 1980
58	Niger	3 September 1980
59	Luxembourg	15 September 1980
60	Philippines	6 October 1980
61	Somalia	1980
62	Comoros	9 January 1981
63	Tanzania	9 January 1981
64	Nigeria	18 January 1981
65	Australia	8 February 1981
66	Guinea	17 February 1981
67	Sri Lanka	17 February 1981
68	Maldives	20 February 1981
69	Gabon	30 March 1981
70	Burkina Faso	5 October 1981
71	Malaysia	15 January 1982
72	Zambia	1 June 1982
73	Zimbabwe	15 June 1982
74	Ecuador	9 July 1982
75	Sierra Leone	10 December 1982
76	Seychelles	13 April 1983
77	Brunei	24 March 1984
78	Saint Lucia	28 March 1984
79	Singapore	21 February 1985
80	Colombia	25 July 1985
81	New Zealand	5 September 1985
82	Russia	26 September 1985
83	Peru	14 May 1986
84	Jamaica	27 May 1986
85	Venezuela	29 September 1986
86	Bolivia	16 December 1986
87	Uruguay	6 April 1987
88	Ireland	8 July 1987
89	Syria	19 December 1987
90	Uganda	1987
91	Chad	21 January 1989
92	Mauritania	23 January 1989
—	State of Palestine	23 January 1989
93	Ghana	1 March 1989
94	Poland	24 January 1990
95	Bulgaria	17 June 1990
96	Hungary	19 June 1990
97	Ivory Coast	28 January 1991
98	Mauritius	31 January 1991
99	Nicaragua	26 September 1991
100	Iceland	26 February 1992
101	Uzbekistan	22 April 1992
102	Kazakhstan	27 April 1992
103	Mongolia	27 April 1992
104	Kyrgyzstan	18 May 1992
105	Ukraine	19 May 1992
106	North Korea	20 May 1992
107	Turkmenistan	29 May 1992
108	Vietnam	9 June 1992
109	Moldova	25 June 1992
110	Armenia	7 July 1992
111	Azerbaijan	13 July 1992
112	Belarus	23 July 1992
113	Guinea-Bissau	5 August 1992
114	Lithuania	22 September 1992
115	Estonia	23 September 1992
116	Albania	7 December 1992
117	Latvia	5 February 1993
118	Czech Republic	1 March 1993
119	Slovakia	3 March 1993
120	Mozambique	4 May 1993
121	Guatemala	13 October 1993
122	Panama	25 February 1994
123	Eritrea	30 April 1994
124	Cuba	23 May 1994
125	Ethiopia	7 February 1995
126	South Africa	4 October 1995
127	Slovenia	13 December 1995
128	North Macedonia	28 December 1995
129	Bosnia and Herzegovina	3 January 1996
130	Guyana	17 January 1996
131	Croatia	30 June 1997
132	São Tomé and Príncipe	15 September 1997
133	Rwanda	March 1998
134	Cameroon	30 November 1998
135	Suriname	13 July 1999
136	Laos	9 March 2005
137	Afghanistan	25 March 2005
138	Paraguay	15 November 2005
139	Angola	12 December 2005
140	Belize	3 March 2006
141	Cape Verde	22 May 2006
142	Antigua and Barbuda	5 October 2006
143	Montenegro	11 April 2007
144	Tajikistan	15 November 2007
145	Costa Rica	19 December 2007
146	Andorra	10 March 2008
147	El Salvador	14 April 2008
148	Georgia	16 April 2008
149	Cambodia	16 November 2009
150	Dominican Republic	17 March 2010
151	Fiji	12 July 2010
152	Myanmar	14 December 2010
—	Kosovo	4 February 2011
153	Monaco	20 February 2013
154	Bhutan	15 March 2013
155	Eswatini	18 March 2013
156	South Sudan	11 June 2013
157	Madagascar	29 June 2016
158	Malawi	7 December 2016
159	Togo	5 June 2017
160	Namibia	27 February 2018
161	Benin	16 November 2018
162	San Marino	26 November 2018
163	Saint Vincent and the Grenadines	1 April 2019
164	Timor-Leste	30 March 2022
165	Bahamas	10 January 2023
—	Holy See	23 February 2023
166	Trinidad and Tobago	27 March 2023
167	Solomon Islands	19 September 2023
168	Vanuatu	18 November 2023
169	Liechtenstein	4 March 2024
170	Tonga	14 March 2024
171	Equatorial Guinea	1 April 2024
172	Kiribati	2 July 2024
173	Nauru	15 May 2025
174	Saint Kitts and Nevis	12 August 2025
175	Botswana	14 October 2025
176	Lesotho	14 October 2026
177	Liberia	9 November 2026
178	Libya	Unknown

== Bilateral relations ==
Country	Formal Relations Began	Notes
Azerbaijan	13 July 1992	The Sultanate of Oman recognized the independence of the Republic of Azerbaijan from the Soviet Union on 30 December 1991.; Both countries established diplomatic relations on 13 July 1992
Botswana	14 October 2025	Both countries established diplomatic relations on 14 October 2025 See Botswana–Oman relations: On 13 April 2026, President Duma Boko secured agreements with Oman regarding mineral exploration, oil storage infrastructure, and renewable power.; Botswana has announced plans to open an embassy in Muscat.
Brunei	24 March 1984	Both countries established diplomatic relations on 24 March 1984 See Brunei–Oman relations Brunei has an embassy in Muscat, and Oman has an embassy in Bandar Seri Begawan. Relations have been established since 24 March 1984. Both countries are former protectorates of European powers (the British for Brunei and first the Portuguese and later the British for Oman), and both are now governed by an Islamic absolute monarchy.
Canada	2 February 1974	Both countries established diplomatic relations on 2 February 1974 In September 2016, Oman played an important role in securing the release of Homa Hoodfar, an Iranian-Canadian citizen and professor at Concordia University. She had been held prisoner in Iran's Evin Prison since 6 June 2016. This happened soon after a secretive meeting between Canada's prime minister, Justin Trudeau, and Oman's Minister Responsible for Foreign Affairs, Yusuf bin Alawi bin Abdullah.
China	25 May 1978	Both countries established diplomatic relations on 25 May 1978: China has an embassy in Muscat.; Oman has an embassy in Beijing.; In June 2020, Oman was one of 53 countries that backed the Hong Kong national security law at the United Nations.
Egypt	27 November 1972	Both countries established diplomatic relations on 27 November 1972 Oman was the only Arab state besides Sudan under Jaafar Nimeiry to maintain good relations with Anwar al Sadat after Egypt recognized Israel. An NGO which launched a probe into foreign funding of organizations in Egypt found that Oman, along with the United Arab Emirates, donated $14.1 million to the Mohamed Alaa Mubarak institute, which was named after Hosni Mubarak's grandson.
Germany	16 May 1972	Both countries established diplomatic relations on 16 May 1972 See Germany–Oman relations: Germany has an embassy in Muscat.; Oman has an embassy in Berlin.
India	25 July 1971	Both countries established diplomatic relations on 25 July 1971, when the level of Indian representation was raised to embassy. See India-Oman relations India has an embassy in Muscat, Oman. The Indian consulate was opened in Muscat in February 1955, and five years later it was upgraded to a consulate general and later developed into a full-fledged embassy in 1971. The first ambassador of India arrived in Muscat in 1973. Oman established its embassy in New Delhi in 1972 and a consulate general in Mumbai in 1976. India has been considering the construction of a 1,100-km-long underwater gas pipeline from Oman for transporting natural gas. Called the South Asia Gas Enterprise (SAGE), it will act as an alternative to the Iran–Pakistan–India pipeline. The proposed sub-sea pipeline will meet the additional gas requirement of the UAE, Oman, and India, besides easing gas transportation issues of producing countries like Turkmenistan, Iran and Qatar. The project has been slow in materialising although it was first mooted in 1985. $5.6 bn Oman-India energy pipeline plans progressing: Fox Petroleum Group envisions a roughly five-year timeframe for the execution of the pipeline project. Ajay Kumar, the chairman and managing director of Fox Petroleum, based in New Delhi, which is an associate company of Fox Petroleum FZC in the UAE, said that Mr Modi had "fired the best weapon of economic development and growth". "He has given a red carpet for global players to invest in India," Mr Kumar added. "It will boost all sectors of industry – especially for small-scale manufacturing units and heavy industries too. Ajay Kumar, chairman and managing director of Fox Petroleum, said, “In the last few years, deepsea gas pipeline technology has matured. Since India has serious security concerns with regard to pipeline projects over land, a deepsea pipeline is probably the most promising option. This 1,600-kilometer OIMPP project intends to transport 8 trillion cubic feet of natural gas to India over a period of 20 years. The pipeline is planned to be about 1,300 kilometers long in Phase I, and 300 kilometers more to connect Mumbai, laid at a depth of 3,400 meters below the seabed. It will connect the Middle East Compression Station near Oman with the receiving terminal near Gujarat.” A week prior to the Iran-P5+1 Framework Agreement, Fox Petroleum issued a proposal for the construction of the Oman-India Multi-Purpose Pipeline (OIMPP), a deep water pipeline system to transport Iranian natural gas via Oman to a receiving terminal on the coast of India's Gujarat state. Costing an estimated $5.6 billion, the 1,600 km pipeline would transport 8 trillion cubic meters over a 20-year period. Citing recent advances in deep-sea pipeline technology, Fox Petroleum's chairman asserted that gas imports to India via OIMPP would be less expensive than India's LNG imports by $1.5–2 per million BTU. The same pipeline system could also be used to transport natural gas from Qatar to India, thereby creating a nexus of Persian Gulf natural gas suppliers oriented toward supplying the world's fast growing major economy. And, as Modi intimated in Ashgabat the potential would even exist for Turkmenistan to export its gas to India across Iran and via the undersea pipeline. Source:
Iran	26 August 1971	See Iran–Oman relations Both countries established diplomatic relations on 26 August 1971
Kenya	4 March 1976	Both countries established diplomatic relations on 4 March 1976 See Kenya–Oman relations: Kenya has an embassy in Muscat.; Oman has an embassy in Nairobi.
Malaysia	15 January 1982	See Malaysia–Oman relations Malaysia and Oman established diplomatic relations on 15 January 1982. Since that, bilateral trade between Malaysia and Oman stood at nearly RM500 million during January–October 2010, with Malaysia's main exports to Oman being edible oil, machinery, appliances and parts, wood products, electrical and electronic products.
Mexico	31 July 1975	Both countries established diplomatic relations on 31 July 1975 See Mexico–Oman relations: Mexico is accredited to Oman from its embassy in Riyadh, Saudi Arabia and maintains an honorary consulate in Muscat.; Oman is accredited to Mexico from its embassy in Washington, D.C., United States and maintains an honorary consulate in Mexico City.
Pakistan	15 October 1971	Both countries established diplomatic relations on 15 October 1971, when Pakistani Consulate-General in Muscat upgraded to Embassy See Oman–Pakistan relations The relationship between Islamabad and Muscat is warm, because it is the nearest Arab country to Pakistan and the fact that some 30% of Omanis are of Balochi origin from Pakistan's Balochistan province, having settled in Oman over a hundred years ago. In 1958 Gwadar was part of Oman but was transferred to Pakistan in that year.
Qatar	27 June 1972	See Oman–Qatar relations Both countries established diplomatic relations on 27 June 1972: Oman has an embassy in Doha.; Qatar has an embassy in Muscat.
Russia	26 September 1985	See Oman–Russia relations Both countries established diplomatic relations on 26 September 1985: Oman has an embassy Moscow.; Russia has an embassy in Muscat.
Saudi Arabia	14 December 1971	See Oman–Saudi Arabia relations Both countries established diplomatic relations on 14 December 1971: Oman has an embassy in Riyadh and a consulate in Jeddah.; Saudi Arabia has an embassy in Muscat.
South Korea	28 March 1974	Both countries established diplomatic relations on 28 March 1974 The Republic of Korea-Oman Agreement on the mutual waiver of visa requirements for holders of diplomatic, official, special and service passports came into effect on 11 April 2015. The agreement allowed citizens of the two countries with valid diplomatic, official, special, or service passports to stay in each other's territories without visa for up to 90 days. The agreement was made to help promote inter-governmental and people-to-people exchanges as well as substantive cooperation between the two countries.
United Arab Emirates	1 April 1973	See Oman–United Arab Emirates relations Both countries established full diplomatic relations on 1 April 1973 In December 2010, Oman discovered a spy network operated by the United Arab Emirates which collected information on Oman's military and government. They were reportedly interested in who would replace Qaboos as his heir and about Oman's relations with Iran. Kuwait mediated in the dispute.
United Kingdom	28 June 1971	See Oman–United Kingdom relations Omani Sultanate Haitham bin Tariq with British Prime Minister Keir Starmer in 10 Downing Street, August 2024. Oman established diplomatic relations with the United Kingdom on 21 May 1971.: Oman maintains an embassy in London.; The United Kingdom is accredited to Oman through its embassy in Muscat.; The UK governed Oman from 1891 until 1951, when Oman achieved full independence. Both countries share common membership of the World Trade Organization. Bilaterally the two countries have a Comprehensive Agreement on Enduring Friendship and Bilateral Cooperation, a Double Taxation Agreement, an Investment Agreement, and a Mutual Defence Agreement. Both countries are negotiating a Free Trade Agreement.
United States	17 April 1972	Both countries established diplomatic relations on 17 April 1972 See Oman–United States relations In 1974 and April 1983, Sultan Qaboos of Oman made state visits to the United States. Vice President George H. Bush visited Oman in 1984 and 1986, and President Bill Clinton visited briefly in March 2000. Vice President Dick Cheney visited Oman in 2002, 2005, 2006, and 2008. In March 2005, the U.S. and Oman launched negotiations on a Free Trade Agreement that were successfully concluded in October 2005. The FTA was signed on 19 January 2006, and is pending implementation.: Oman has an embassy in Washington, D.C.; United States has an embassy in Muscat.

== See also ==
- Iran-Arab Relations (Oman)
- List of diplomatic missions in Oman
- List of diplomatic missions of Oman
- Territorial disputes in the Persian Gulf
- Foreign Ministry (Oman)
