= Khalid Al-Bloushi =

Khalid Al-Bloushi may refer to:

- Khalid Al-Bloushi (footballer, born 1999), an Emirati footballer
- Khalid Abdulla Al Bloushi, an Emirati footballer
