= Iranians in the United Arab Emirates =

Total population
- 500,000 (2015); 5-8% of the UAE population 800,000 (estimates, 2012) more than 8% of the UAE population

Regions with significant populations
- Dubai; Abu Dhabi; Al Ain

Languages
- Arabic, Persian, Achomi, Balochi, Kurdish, and other languages of Iran. (see Languages of Iran).

Religion
- Sunni Islam, Shi'a

Related ethnic groups
- Iranian diaspora (Ajam Emiratis • Ajam of Bahrain • Ajam of Qatar • Ajam of Iraq • 'Ajam of Kuwait • Iranians of Canada • Iranians of America • Iranians of UK • Iranians of Germany • Iranians of Israel • Iranians in Turkey) Iranian Peoples (Lurs, Achomis, Baluchs, Kurds, Iranian Azeris), Turkic peoples (Qashqai, Azerbaijanis), Huwala

Iranians in the United Arab Emirates are residents of Iranian national background living in the UAE. They comprise an estimated 5–8% of the population and have contributed significantly to the country’s commercial, cultural, and social development, particularly in cities such as Dubai and Sharjah. This figure refers specifically to Iranian expatriates and does not include Ajam Emiratis (Emirati citizens of Iranian ancestry).

== Demographics ==
Due to the geographical proximity between Iran and the United Arab Emirates, Persians were among the first major groups of foreign settlers in the region, with a history dating back to the 1810s. Over time, they have become a deeply rooted and respected community within the UAE.

By the early 20th century, over 500 Persian Gulf Iranians were already residing in Abu Dhabi, with many others having moved to Dubai, where they helped establish the Bastakiyah district.

Persians who resided in the Trucial States prior to 1925 or before the formation of the union were offered the Emirati citizenship as per Article 17 of the United Arab Emirates Citizenship and Passport Law of Year 1972.

Today, the UAE is home to an estimated 500,000 to 800,000 Iranian expatriates, the majority of whom live in Dubai. The Iranian Club in Dubai serves as a cultural and social hub for Iranian expatriates, preserving their cultural heritage and providing a space for community activities.

The Iranian population in the UAE also includes smaller communities of Emirati Balochs (Baloch people living in the UAE) and Iranian Arabs from Hormozgan. The community is known for its entrepreneurial spirit, with over 8,000 Iranian-backed businesses operating in Dubai, contributing significantly to the local economy. These businesses collectively hold more than $300 billion in assets within the UAE.

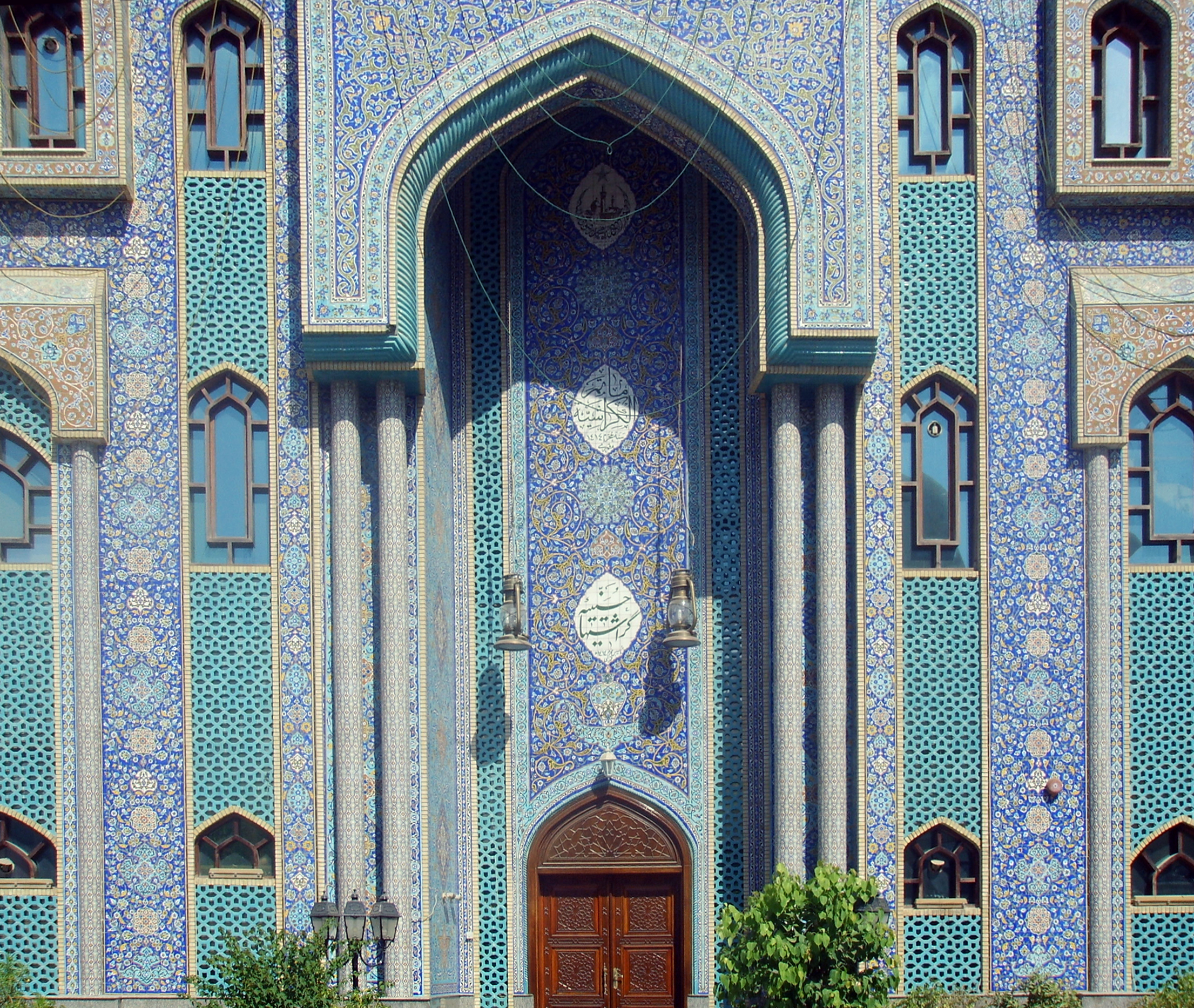
Iranian "Gerashi" Husayniyya in Dubai (Arabic: مأتم الكراشية, Persian: حسینیه گراشیا)

They are generally composed of:

- Achomi people: Achum/Achami people also known as "Khodmooni", are Iranian people native to the south of Iran who have migrated from various areas of "Irahistan" (Bastak, Khonj, Evaz, Jenah, etc..); most notably from "Bastak", thus "Al-Bastaki" surname, Bastaki, Evazi, and Khonji sub-dialects of Achomi, and Al-Bastakiya Neighbourhood in Dubai. They are generally of Sunni Shafi'i and Maliki background and some refer to themselves as "Huwala" possibly to denote their Sunni faith, although there are Gerashi Achomis of Shia background.
- Emirati Balochs: Baloch people who migrated from Balochistan. Most of them have the "Al-Balushi" surname.

== Contributions ==
=== Business and organizations ===
The Emirati Iranian community is highly respected and has established a strong presence in various sectors, including trade, healthcare, and real estate. There are over 8,000 Iranian-backed businesses in Dubai, ranging from small enterprises to large conglomerates. The Iranian Business Council - Dubai and the Iranian Hospital in Dubai are among the key institutions that serve the community and beyond.

Iran maintains a consulate-general in Dubai, which plays a crucial role in diplomatic relations and supporting the needs of Iranian nationals in the UAE.

The Badgirs of Al-Bastakiyeh

=== Al-Bastakiyeh ===
The Badgirs in Dubai's Bastakiyah district are a testament to Iran's deep historical ties with the Gulf Arab states. These have been generally introduced to Bahrain and UAE by Achomis.

== Religion ==
The Emirati Iranian community practices a mix of Sunni and Shia Islam, reflecting the religious diversity of Iran. The community is also home to a significant number of Bahá'ís. Among the most notable religious sites are the Iranian Mosque in Bur Dubai and the Iranian Mosque in Satwa, which serve as cultural and religious centers for Iranians in the UAE.

== Cultural integration ==
The Iranian community in the United Arab Emirates plays a role in the country's economic and cultural sectors. Iranian expatriates and citizens maintain cultural traditions while participating in local business and commercial activities alongside the UAE's broader populations.

== Culture ==
=== Music ===
Many Bandari music bands existed in UAE and sung in Achomi (Bastaki dialect), such as:

- Ghanati Band
- Salami Band
- Al-Rahaba Band
- Nasa'em Band
- Al-Kawakib Band
- Mayed Band
- Hassan Gharib Band

=== Known families ===
- Al-Ali
- Al-Gurg
- Al-Hajiri
- Al-Mulla
- Al-Serkal
- Darwish
- Bastaki/Al-Bastaki
- Qasimi
- Zaruni
- Abdullatif
- Al-Abudi
- Al-Ansari
- Al-Fardan
- Al-Tajir
- Badri
- Fikri
- Al-Galadari/Galadari
- Ghulam Abbas
- Sayigh
- Awadhi/Al-Awadhi
- Al-Jakkah
- Al-Kharji
- Al-Raqbani
- Al-Saffarini
- Al-Sharafa
- Bahruzian
- Murtaza
- Naboodah
- Natafji
- Rostamani
- Shahin
- Sharif

== Notable people ==
- Huda Al-Khatib: Emirati actress of Achomi ancestry. She appeared in the Kuwaiti serial "Al-Da'la" where she speaks broken Arabic, and mixes it with Persian/Achomi, the serial has a full scene in which the character she plays is learning the Arabic language and sings the Laristani/Achomi/Khudmuni/Bastaki song "Ghalyon ma teshn, ghori ma chai, yar nazanin, jaye to khali" (My hookah has no fire, my teapot has no tea, my beloved, your place is empty).
- Khadija Al-Bastaki: Emirati businesswoman of Achomi ancestry.
- Ahllam: Emirati singer, of paternal Ahvazi and maternal Tehrani ancestry.
- Arvin Bastaki: Emirati Achomi singer.
- Shahad Al-Bastaki: Emirati singer.
- Hamdan Al-Baloushi: Emirati singer.

== Gallery ==
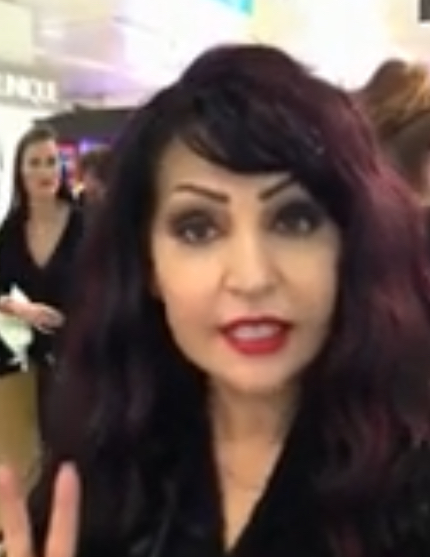
Huda Al-Khatib

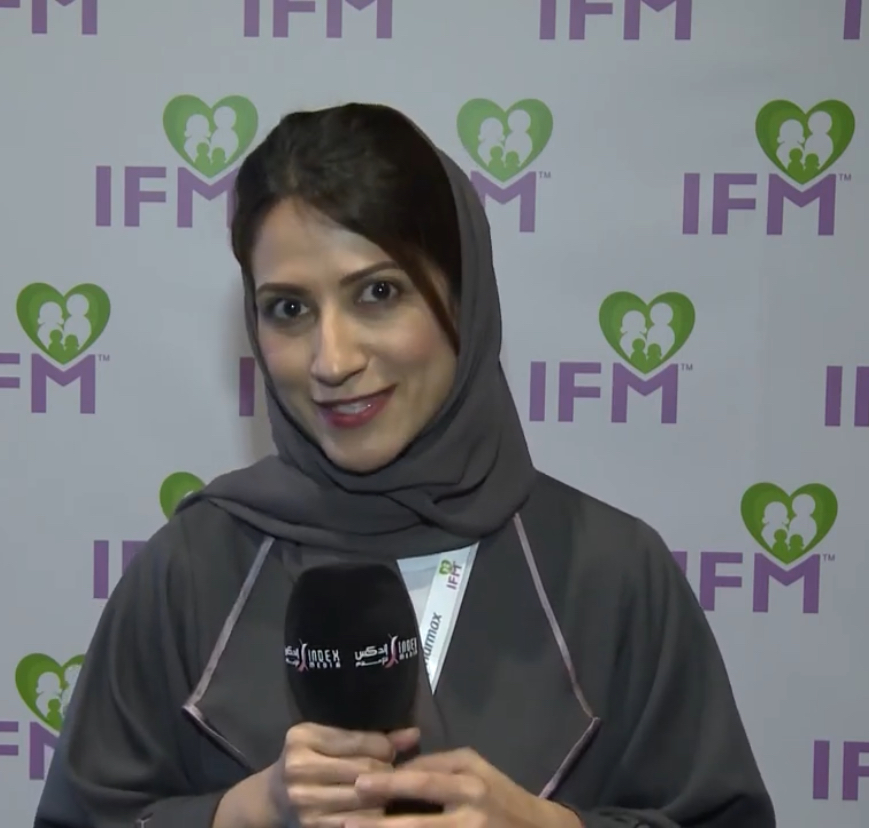
Ibtessam Al-Bastaki

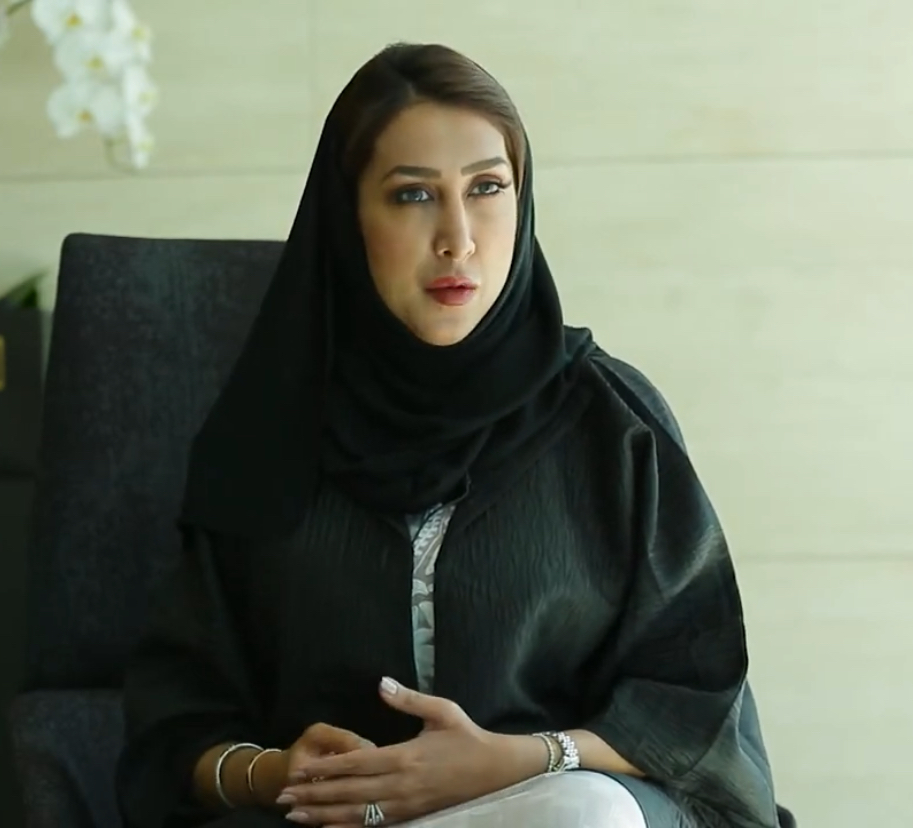
Khadija Al-Bastaki

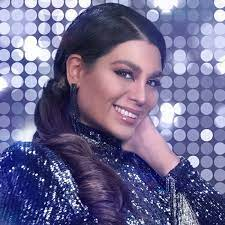
Ahllam

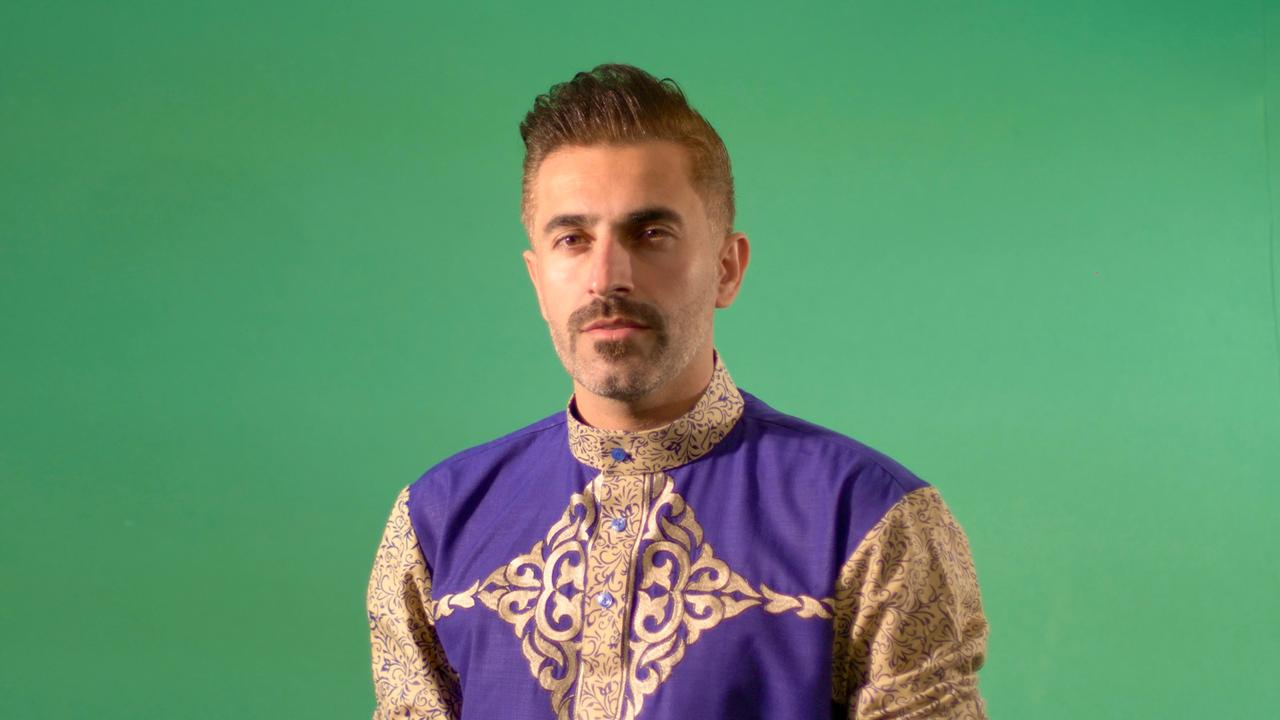
Arvin Bastaki

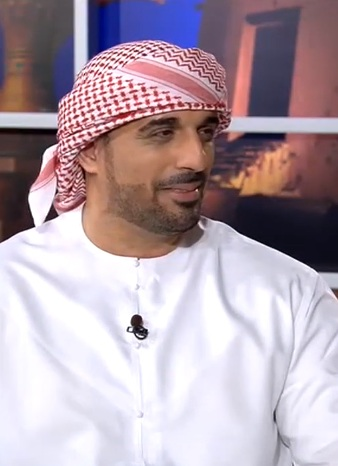
Moein Al-Bastaki

== See also ==
- Expatriates in the United Arab Emirates
- Iranian diaspora
- Iran–United Arab Emirates relations
