= Iranian Mosque, Bur Dubai =

Mosque in Dubai, United Arab Emirates

Iranian (Garashi) Hosainia
- Arabic: حسينية الشيعية الگراشية الإيرانيين
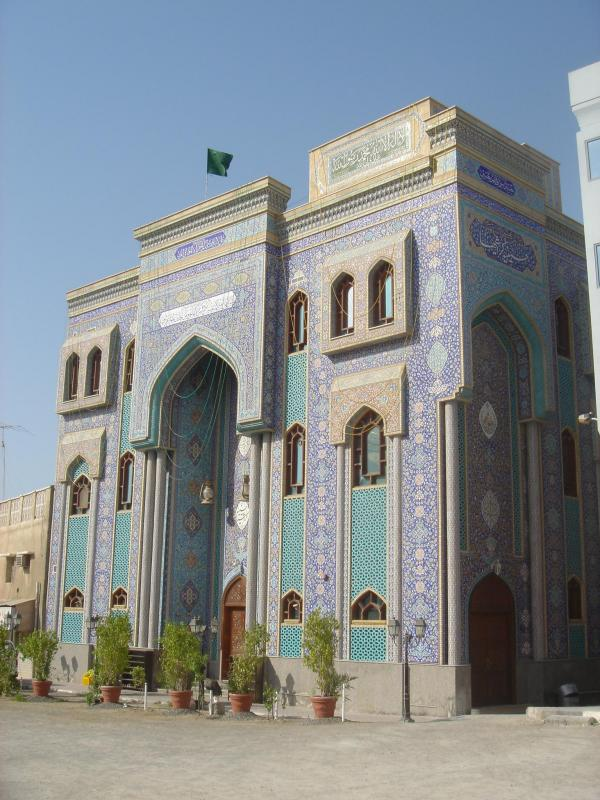

- Location on the mosque in Dubai

Religion
- Affiliation: Shia (Twelver)
- Ecclesiastical or organizational status: Hosainia
- Status: Active

Location
- Location: Bur Dubai, Dubai
- Country: United Arab Emirates
- Interactive map of Iranian (Garashi) Hosainia
- Coordinates: 25°15′49.4″N 55°17′38.8″E

Architecture
- Type: Mosque architecture
- Style: Persian
- Completed: 1979

The Iranian Mosque Hosainia (Arabic: الحسينية الشيعية الايرانية; Persian: حسينیه شیعی ایرانی) is a Twelver Shia hosainia located near the old Textile Souk in the Bur Dubai district of Dubai, United Arab Emirates. Built in 1979, the mosque is also known as Ali Ibn Abi Talib Mosque, in honor of Ali Ibn Abi Talib, the central figure of Shiism.

== Architecture ==
The mosque is inspired by Persian architecture and is notable for its colorful exterior and interior. It features a façade and onion dome marked with extensive Persian faience tilework, and an azure blue background featured in floral patterns. Islamic calligraphy from the Quran is inscribed in rosettes, amidst swirls in colors of green, yellow, red and white. The mosque has its origins among the city's Iranian community.

Lonely Planet describes it as a "simple yet striking mosque in the textile area of Bur Dubai Souq" and is notable for its "sensuous, bulbous domes and gently tapering minaret."

There is another Iranian Mosque in Satwa which is also a Shia mosque inspired by similar elements.

== See also ==
- Shia Islam in the United Arab Emirates
- List of mosques in the United Arab Emirates
