= Omani Baloch =

Baloch People in Oman
Total population
- 1,000,000 (20%)

Regions with significant populations
- Muscat, Al Batinah, Al Buraimi, Dhofar, Ash Sharqiyah, Dhahirah

Languages
- Arabic, Balochi, Jadgali

Religion
- Sunni Islam

Related ethnic groups
- Omanis, Baloch

Omani Baloch are the nationals of the Sultanate of Oman who are of Baloch ancestry. Around 20% of Omanis are of Baloch descent, whose ancestors migrated to Oman centuries ago, now considered native. A significant population of Omani Balochis are of Zadjali origin.

Baloch form the largest non-Arab community in Oman, and most of them have al-Balushi as a surname. Omani Balochis previously served as mercenary soldiers for Oman between 18th and 20th century. The first modern army of Oman was exclusively Baloch, and even today around 40% of the Omani Army consists of Baloch people.

== Notable people ==
- Azan Al-Balushi, footballer
- Hamed Al-Balushi, footballer
- Jamal Nabi Al-Balushi, footballer
- Mohammed Al-Balushi, footballer
- Muheeb Al-Balushi, footballer
- Wadha Al-Balushi, sports shooter

== See also ==
- Al-Balushi
- Baloch people in the United Arab Emirates
- Baloch diaspora
- Baloch of Turkmenistan
- Al-Lawatia
