= Shia Islam in the United Arab Emirates =

Islam in the United Arab Emirates

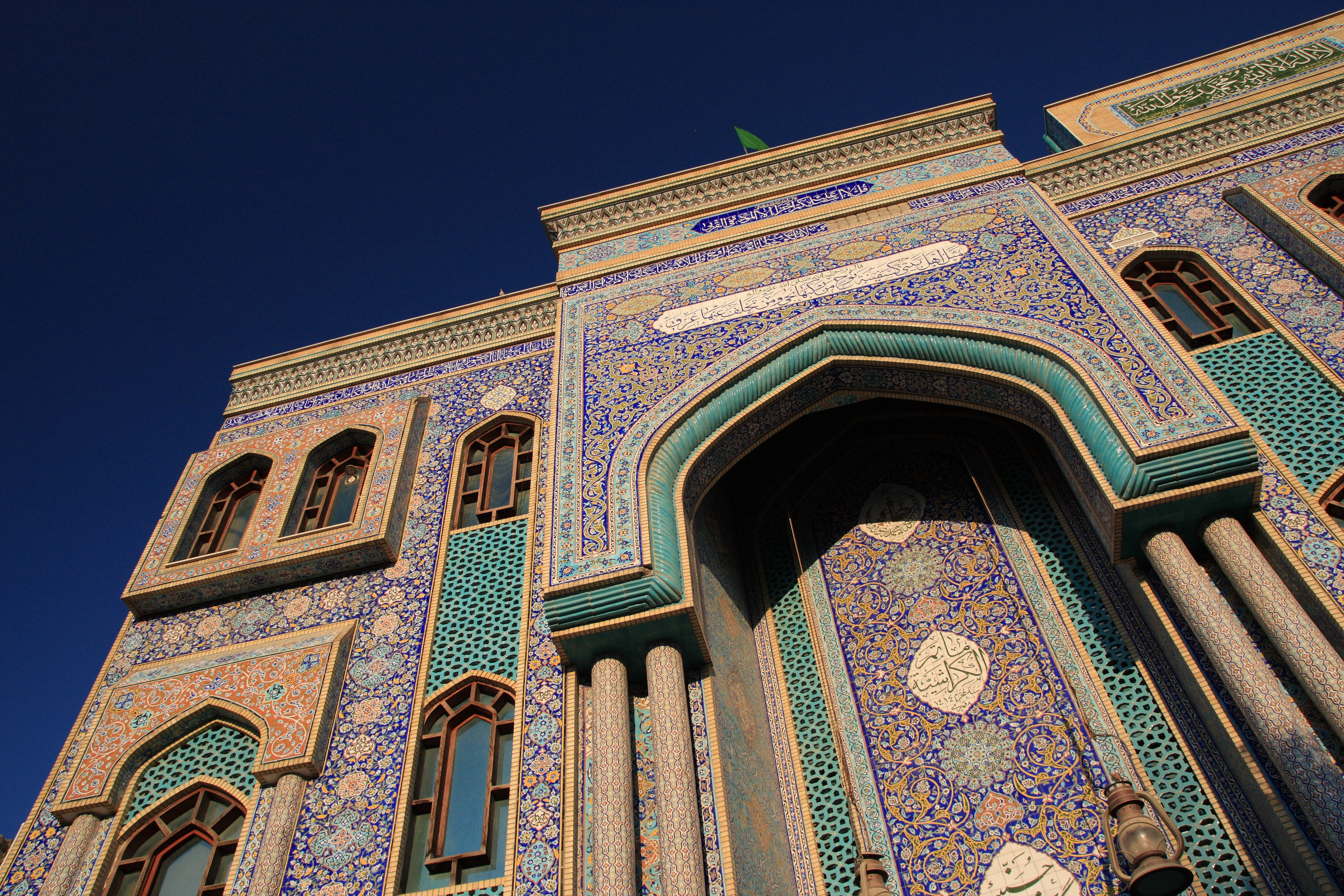
The Iranian Mosque in Bur Dubai.

Shia Islam is practiced by a minority of Muslims in the United Arab Emirates. It is also practiced among expatriate Muslim communities living in the country, most notably Iranians, as well as some Arabs, Pakistanis, Indians, and other nationalities. Non-Twelver Shia branches such as Ismailis and the Dawoodi Bohras are also present in the UAE and account for less than 5% of the total population. Shia nationals are concentrated in the city of Dubai, belonging mostly to the latest (1920s) wave of migrants who managed to obtain citizenship.

== Background ==
The UAE is a Muslim-majority country. Part Seven of the UAE Constitution declares Islam as the official state religion. In Dubai, the government appoints all imams, whether Sunni or Shia, as well as regulating religious sermon content preached in mosques. Shia mosques are designated by the government as private, but are able to apply for government funding upon request. Shia Muslims are granted freedom to worship, and maintain their mosques. Shias may also pursue family law cases through a special Shia council. Most Shias are concentrated in the emirates of Abu Dhabi, Dubai and Sharjah.

== Society ==
Shia citizens in the UAE, a section of which are of Iranian origin, have historically been an important segment of the business community, as well as enjoying representation in the UAE's political establishment.

In recent years, a small number of Shia Muslim expatriates have been deported from the UAE. Some Lebanese Shia families in particular have complained of deportation for allegedly harbouring sympathy for Hezbollah. According to some organizations, the number of such deportees is over 4,000.

== Mosques ==
There are numerous Shia mosques in the country. Amongst the well-known are the Iranian Mosque in Bur Dubai and the Iranian Mosque in Satwa. In 2003, the Aga Khan announced the opening of the first Ismaili center in the Middle East in Dubai. The land it was built on was donated by then Crown Prince of Dubai, Sheikh Mohammed bin Rashid Al Maktoum.

== See also ==
- Islam in the United Arab Emirates
- Shia Muslims in the Arab world
