= Iranian Club, Dubai =

Social club in Oud Metha, Dubai, UAE

Iranian Club Dubai
- The logo of the Iranian Club Dubai
- Formation: 1990 (36 years ago)
- Type: Social club
- Coordinates: 25°14′13.5″N 55°18′55.3″E
- Members: >15,000 (2002)
- Website: www.icd.ae

The Iranian Club Dubai (Arabic: النادي الإيراني دبي; Persian: باشگاه ایرانیان دبی) is a social club complex located in the Oud Metha area of Dubai, United Arab Emirates. It is funded by the Iranian government and is run by the Iranian community in Dubai.

== Background ==
The club was inaugurated in 1990 by Sheikh Rashid Al Maktoum as a venue for showcasing Iranian cultural activities, and is funded by the Mostazafan Foundation, a semi-government organization in Iran. Spread over an area of 50,000 square feet, the club is non-profit and is open to both Iranians and non-Iranians. As of 2002, non-Iranian membership stood up to 5,000, while the number of Iranian members was twice as much. Acquiring club membership is free, with members only having to pay for the activities facilitated by the club.

== Facilities ==
The Iranian Club features a hotel with 22 rooms, an Iranian restaurant, sports facilities, and a theatre and auditorium for cultural events. The club has a cultural department which organises cultural programs, and an educational department which provides language classes and arranges school-level activities. There is a library which hosts thousands of books in Arabic, Persian and English. Sports facilities include tennis, basketball and volleyball courts, swimming pools, a football ground, and gymnasiums. There are also two wedding halls. Events such as business conferences and graduation ceremonies are frequently held at the club. The club advises formal dress guidelines which must be adhered to.

== See also ==
- Iranian Business Council - Dubai
- Iranian Hospital, Dubai
- Iran–United Arab Emirates relations
