= Kenya–Oman relations =

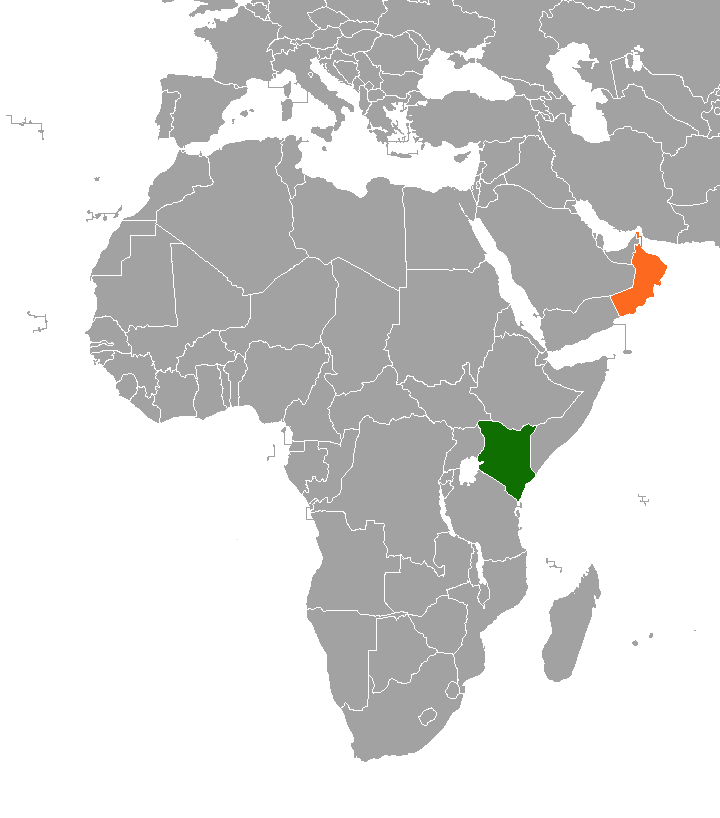

- Kenya: Oman

Kenya–Oman relations are bilateral relations between Kenya and Oman. Both countries are members of the Indian-Ocean Rim Association and Group of 77.

== History ==
Kenya's coastal cities and towns still have traces of architecture and culture from Oman. Some of the residents of these cities can trace their ancestry. Mombasa, is Kenya's second largest city and Omani architecture and culture is evident in the city.

Present day Kenya and Oman established diplomatic relations in 1976. In 1977, the first Omani ambassador presented credentials to Kenya's President Kenyatta. The Omani embassy was closed in 1986 and reopened in 2013.

The Kenyan embassy in Muscat was opened in 2011 by Foreign Minister Moses Wetangula.

== Development cooperation ==
Kenya and Oman are working on a MOU and cooperation agreement to increase cooperation in trade, education, culture, tourism, sports, business, investments and labour.

The MOU will also set a framework to make Mombasa and Muscat sister cities.

== Trade ==
Kenyan exports to Oman stand at KES. 1.2 billion (EUR. 11.5 million). Kenyan imports from Oman stand at KES. 1.5 billion (EUR. 14.2 million).

Main exports from Kenya to Oman include: oils obtained from bituminous minerals, metallic salts, tea and mate, meat, vegetable materials, coffee and coffee substitutes, medicaments, fruits and nuts.

Main exports from Oman to Kenya include: petroleum, stones, machine tools, crude minerals, aluminium, pumps, ships and boats. Oman is a potential market for other Kenyan goods such as meat products, nuts, tea, coffee and flowers.

== Diplomatic missions ==
- Oman maintains an embassy in Nairobi.
- Kenya has an embassy in Muscat.

== See also ==
- Foreign relations of Kenya
- Foreign relations of Oman
