= Germany–Oman relations =

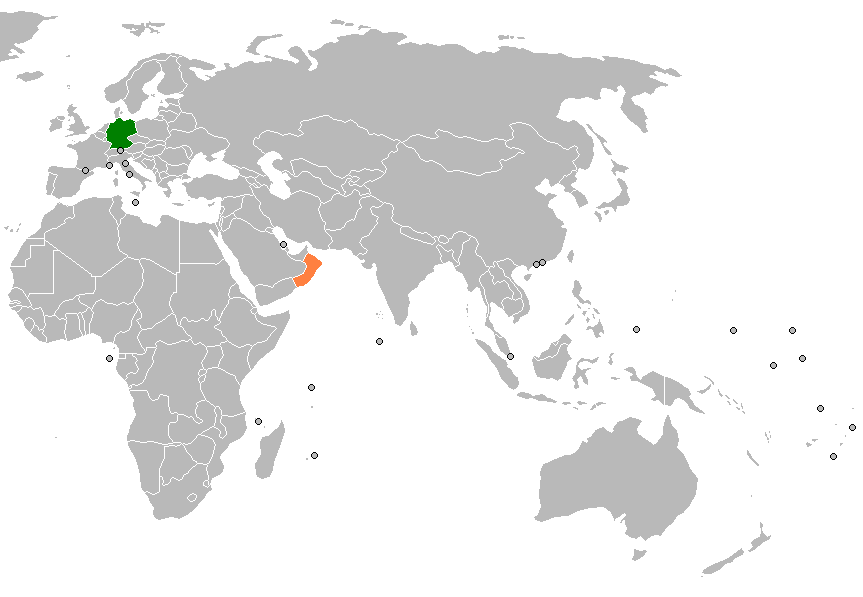

- Germany: Oman

Germany–Oman relations are described by the German Foreign Office as "good and friendly". Germany is one of Oman's most important economic partners in areas outside the oil industry.

== History ==
The first contacts between the two countries can be traced back to the 17th century, when the physician and explorer Engelbert Kaempfer visited Muscat in 1688 and later described the city in his travelogues. In 1867, Omani Zanzibari Princess Salama bint Said married Hamburg merchant Rudolph Heinrich Ruete and later lived in Germany under the name Emily Ruete. Here she published an autobiography named Memoirs of an Arab Princess.

In British-dominated Oman, an uprising broke out in the Dhofar region in the 1960s. In response, left-leaning groups in Germany showed solidarity with the Marxist rebel group PFLO. These groups included Frankfurter Oman-Hilfe and the Solidarity Committee for Support of the Arab Liberation Movement. The conflict ended in the 1970s with the victory of the central government and the pacification of the region.

Diplomatic relations between the Federal Republic of Germany and Oman were established on May 16, 1972. A German embassy in Muscat was opened three years later. In 1979, former Nazi Gauleiter Hartmann Lauterbacher became an advisor to Sultan Qaboos bin Said on youth affairs. In the opening of the country under Sultan Qaboos, Germany became a partner in modernizing infrastructure in the country. After signing several economic agreements, a memorandum of understanding was also signed in 2014 to intensify cooperation in the fields of culture, education, science and research.

== Economic relations ==
An investment protection and promotion agreement (2010) and a double taxation agreement (2012) exist between the two countries. The joint trade volume in 2021 was 765 million euros, putting Oman in 87th place in the ranking of German trading partners. Germany does not import any oil from Oman. There is cooperation in environmental protection and the promotion of renewable energy.

Among tourists from Europe to Oman, Germans are the second-largest group. Many Omanis travel to Germany for medical tourism.

== Cultural relations ==
The German-Omani Society, founded in 1993, serves to promote bilateral cultural relations. On the Omani side, there is the Omani-German-Friendship Association. Since 2007, the German-Omani private university German University of Technology in Oman exists, which is a partner institution of RWTH Aachen University. In Muscat, the Goethe-Institut offers language courses and conducts cultural work from its regional center in Abu Dhabi.

== Diplomatic missions ==
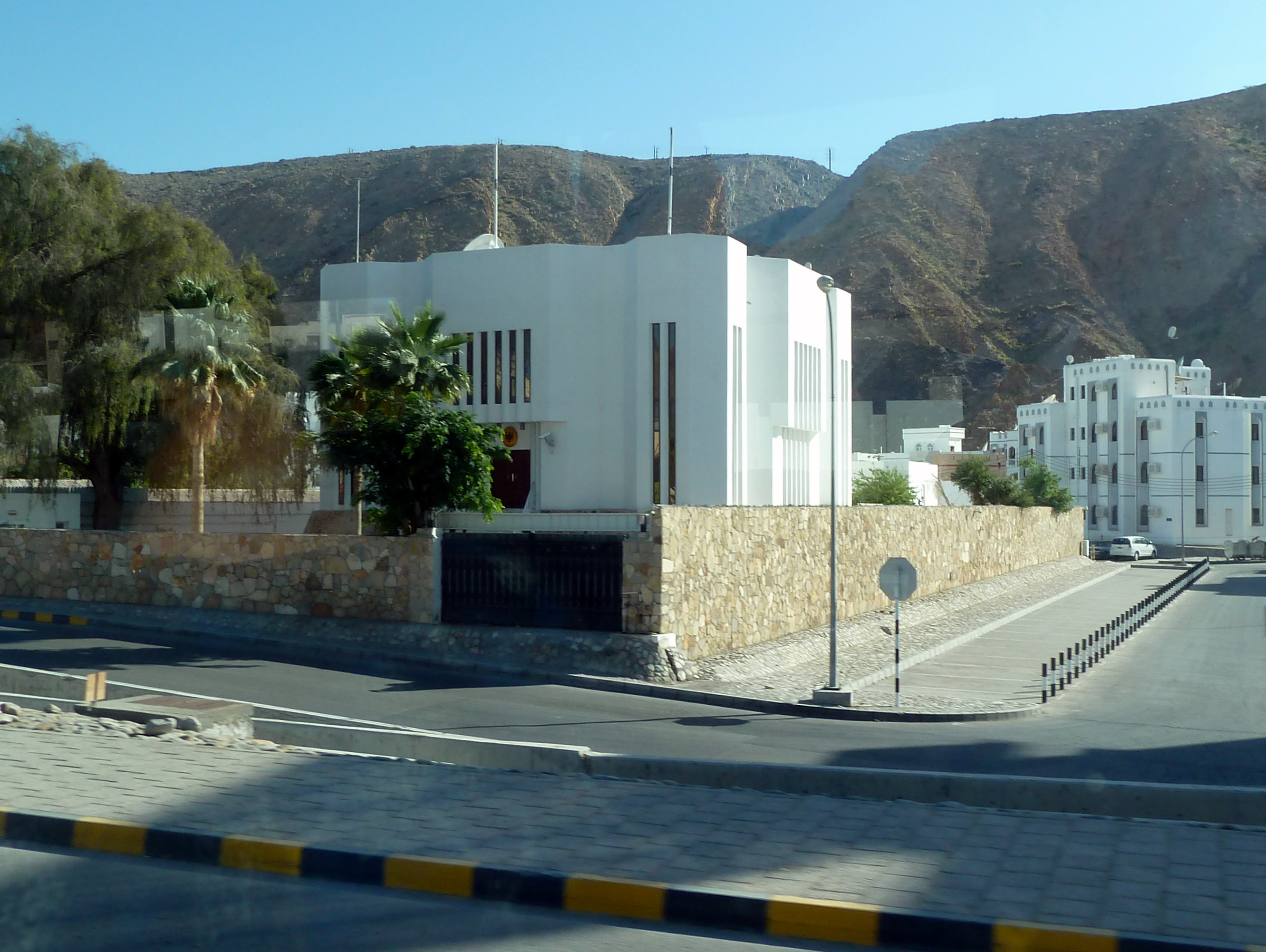
German embassy in Oman

- Germany has an embassy in Muscat.
- Oman has an embassy in Berlin.

== See also ==
- Foreign relations of Germany
- Foreign relations of Oman
