= Iran–Oman relations =

- Oman: Iran

Iran–Oman relations are bilateral relations between Oman and Iran. The two countries currently share diplomatic and economic ties dating back to the Pahlavi period. Unlike the other Arab states of the Persian Gulf, Oman does not perceive Iran as a threat. Both countries are members of the Organisation of Islamic Cooperation, the Non-Aligned Movement and the Group of 77. Iran has an embassy in Muscat whilst Oman has an embassy in Tehran.

Iran is situated across the narrow, strategically important Strait of Hormuz, to Oman in the south. Oman opposed the US and Israeli bombing of Iran during the 2026 Iran War, calling it "immoral and illegal. In March 2026, Iran began launching drone strikes on various sites in Oman. Iranian Foreign Minister later stated that the attacks on Oman were not intentional. However Iran continued carrying out attacks against Oman.

== History ==
=== Pre-Islamic period ===
The northern half of Oman has been part of Maka (later Mazun), a satrapy of the Achaemenid Empire of Persia and later as vassal, under the rule of Al Julanda, to the Sasanian empire.

=== Medieval period ===
Buyid Iran annexed Oman sometime in the tenth century.

Both Oman and Iran eventually came under the rule of the Seljuk Turks.

=== Early modern period ===
Arab pirates from the Persian Gulf colonized the coastal regions of Iran during the collapse of the Safavid dynasty. After the death of Nader Shah, the presence of the coastal Arab states was made permanent. Some areas came under direct Omani rule, a source for conflict between Iran and Oman in the 18th and 19th centuries.

Afsharid Iran invaded Oman in the 1740s. The entire country surrendered to the Persians, but they soon withdrew. Between 1774 and 1779, the Omanis supported Mamluk Iraq against the Persian invasion, even going as far as to deploy a fleet near Basra.

=== Pahlavi dynasty ===
During the Pahlavi dynasty of Iran, the two countries had economic ties. During the Dhofar Rebellion in Oman, Mohammad Reza Shah, beside Britain, intervened in support of the Omani government providing troops and weapons.

=== Islamic Republic of Iran ===
The Baloch people who are ethnically an Iranian people and speak Balochi language (an Iranian language) are a significant minority, comprising approximately 25% of Oman's population. The majority of Iranians are Shia Muslims, while the majority of the Omani population are Ibadi.

Unlike the majority of its Gulf neighbors, Oman managed to uphold diplomatic relations with both sides during the Iran–Iraq War from 1980 to 1988 and strongly supported UN Security Council resolutions to end the conflict. Secret cease-fire talks between the two adversaries were held in Muscat during the war, and although an agreement was never reached during these talks, they did reduce distrust on both sides. Moreover, after the war, Oman mediated talks to restore diplomatic ties between Iran and Saudi Arabia and Iran and the United Kingdom.

During the Persian Gulf War, Iran–Oman relations were damaged after Iran began running attacks on tanker movements in the Persian Gulf and placed anti-ship missile launchers along the Strait of Hormuz.

Oman's leader Sultan Qaboos traveled to Iran in 2009 for the first time since Iran's 1979 Revolution. Though on two occasions the U.S. has dispatched high-level officials to discuss Iran with Oman, the fact that Oman has avoided publicly expressing any concerns regarding Iran's nuclear program is likely a reason why the two states have managed to maintain strong ties.

In addition to strong diplomatic and political ties, Iran and Oman cooperate economically on several fronts, including energy. Most recently, the Gulf neighbors signed an initial agreement to begin supplying large quantities of natural gas from Iran to Oman, a project that was earlier reported to be worth between $7–12 billion. In addition to these major economic projects, the two countries have opened a joint bank to facilitate their mutual financial dealings, agreed to develop the Kish and Hengam gas fields in the Persian Gulf, and signed a memorandum of understanding for a potential joint petrochemical project valued at $800 million.

On March 12, 2014, Iran sealed a deal to export 10 billion cubic meters of gas per year to Oman, an agreement involves building the subsea Iran–Oman pipeline across the Persian Gulf at a cost of about $1 billion. Oman agreed to buy gas from Iran as far back as 2005 and a later draft deal in 2007 included plans for Oman to process Iranian gas for export as liquefied natural gas (LNG), but the two sides had never finalized terms and Oman had been pressured by the United States to source fuel from alternative suppliers such as Qatar, according to leaked US embassy cables.

In recent years, Iran and Oman have taken practical steps toward deepening their economic ties, with both sides signaling a willingness to move beyond declaratory support for trade cooperation. A significant development in this regard is the bilateral preferential trade agreement, which, according to Iran's Trade Promotion Organization, has completed its administrative review and has been forwarded to the Iranian Parliament for final approval. The agreement is expected to be taken up by lawmakers in the coming months.

Alongside these diplomatic efforts, Iran has been working to upgrade its southern port infrastructure as part of a broader strategy to facilitate trade with neighboring countries, including Oman. One notable example is the port of Jask in Hormozgan Province, where authorities have addressed regulatory barriers related to temporary import procedures. These measures are reported to have increased the port's operational capacity, positioning it as a potential hub for trade with Persian Gulf states, particularly Oman.

==== Iran nuclear deal ====
Sultan Qaboos played a key role in facilitating the back channel between the United States and Iran that helped lead to the Iran nuclear deal. Oman has always had good relations with the United States while also maintaining a strong relationship with Iran; most other GCC countries actively oppose Iran because they see it as both an economic and ideological threat. Oman's unique neutral position enabled Sultan Qaboos to mediate between the United States and Iran, the motivations for which mainly regard regional security and personal economic gain. As early as 2009, according to leaked diplomatic cables, Oman offered to arrange secret talks between the US and Iran, which hadn't had diplomatic relations for 30 years. But it was reportedly the detention of three American hikers by Iran (which said they were spies) that brought Oman into a mediating role between the two sides and helped win the release of the detainees. Ironically, efforts to win the release of the hikers turned out to be instrumental in making the clandestine diplomacy possible: after this successful mediation, Sultan Qaboos offered to facilitate a US–Iran rapprochement.

The Iran–US secret talks became more serious in March as Barack Obama dispatched the deputy secretary of State William J. Burns and Vice President Biden's top foreign policy adviser Jake Sullivan together with five technical experts to meet with Iranian officials. Talks conducted over the nuclear issues, Iranian involvement in Syria, Tehran's threats to close the Strait of Hormuz and the status of Robert Levinson and two other Americans detained in Iran. In May, Secretary of State John Kerry visited Oman to make sure the channel would be kept open. After Rouhani was elected as the president of Iran, the final secret meeting was conducted with the American officials under chief US nuclear negotiator Wendy Sherman.

After the deal, regarding Oman's role, President Hassan Rouhani praised Oman's role. US Secretary of State John Kerry said that Oman not only hosted a number of important meetings but also "played a critical role in getting these talks off the ground in the first place".

=== 2026 Iran war ===
On March 1, 2026, three days after unprovoked military attacks by USA and Israel on Iran, Iran started sending drone strikes targeting key energy and shipping infrastructure, especially the ports of Duqm and Salalah. The attacks damaged fuel storage facilities, caused fires, and injured workers, while also disrupting nearby oil tanker operations and regional trade routes.

In October 2026, Badr bin Hamad Al Busaidi, Oman's foreign minister, asked for a non-aggression and security treaty between Iran and the Gulf states, arguing that a 50-year US insistence that the countries should see Iran as a security threat had weakened their ability to resolve their issues.

== Protecting power ==
From July 2012 to October 2013, all Iranian interests in the United Kingdom were maintained by the Omani embassy in London as a protecting power.

== See also ==
- Foreign relations of Iran
- Foreign relations of Oman
- Arab League–Iran relations
- Shia–Sunni relations
