= Mexico–Oman relations =

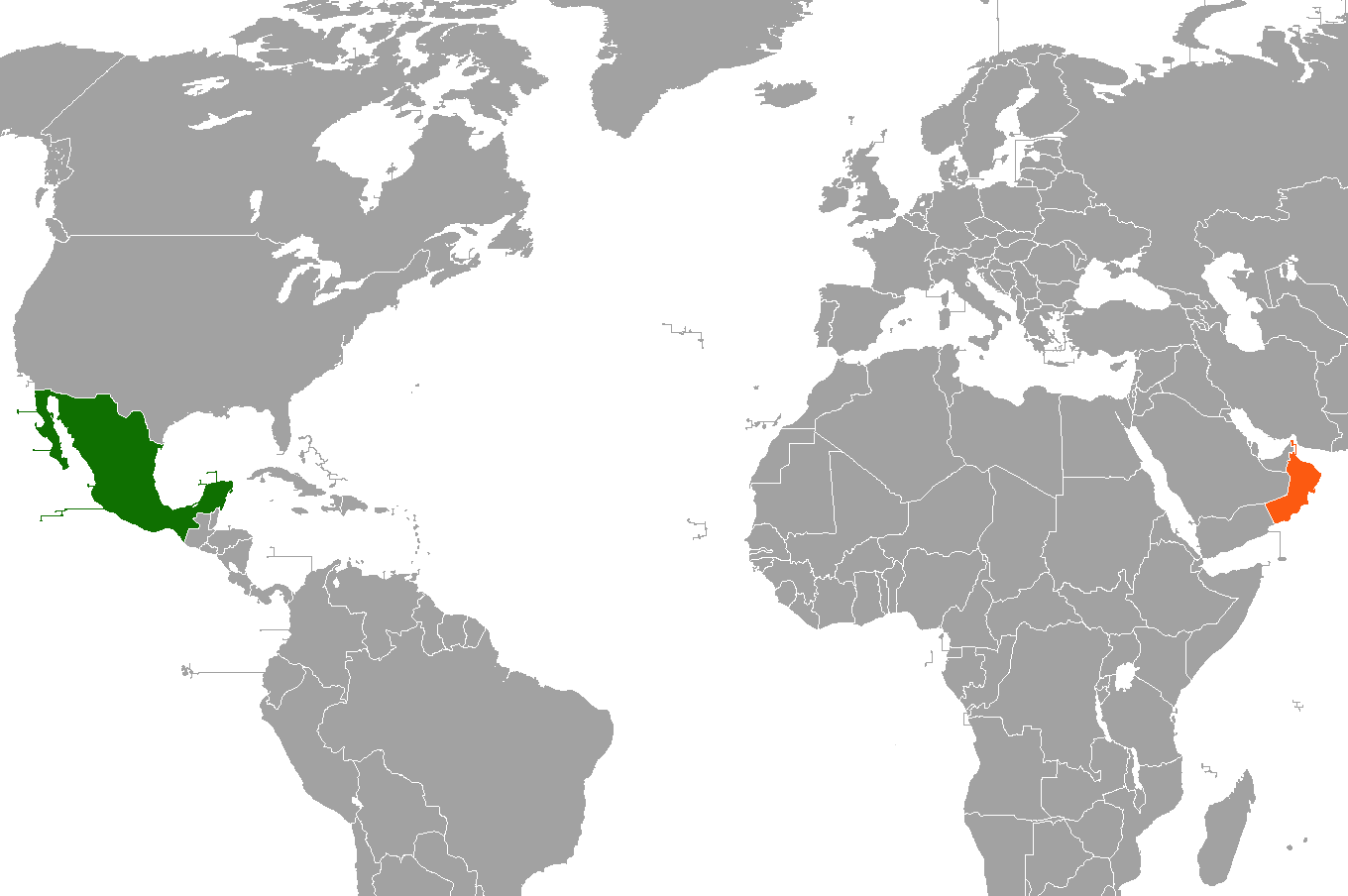

- Mexico: Oman

The nations of Mexico and Oman established diplomatic relations in 1975. Both nations are members of the United Nations.

== History ==
Both nations established diplomatic relations on 31 July 1975. Since the establishment of diplomatic relations, bilateral relations have been maintained mainly through international organizations such as at the United Nations.

In 1986, Mexico opened an honorary consulate in Muscat. In February 2008, Mexican Director General for Africa and the Middle East, Ana Luisa Fajer, visited Oman and met the Secretary General of the Omani Foreign Ministry, as well as members of the Mexican community resident in Oman.

In October 2012, Mexican Foreign Undersecretary, Lourdes Aranda Bezaury, traveled to Oman and met with her counterpart, Ahmed Bin Yousuf Obaid Al-Harthi, where they held the first meeting of bilateral relations between both nations. Foreign Undersecretary Aranda expressed to her counterpart the interest of the Mexican government to strengthen political dialogue with Oman. In February 2013, Foreign Undersecretary Aranda, paid a second visit to Oman with the aim of promoting the candidacy of Dr. Herminio Blanco Mendoza to the post of Director-General of the World Trade Organization.

In February 2013, Oman and Mexico worked together in the development of an encyclopedia on the mango tree. Oman included Mexico in a technical-scientific project on the different types of mango, which has generated extensive cooperation between the governmental institutions of both countries. Scientists from the Royal Court of Sultan visited the Mexican states of Chiapas and Nayarit to conduct field research activities.

In 2024, Mexican Foreign Undersecretary María Teresa Mercado Pérez travelled to Muscat and co-chaired the Second Meeting of the Political Consultation Mechanism with the Undersecretary for Diplomatic Affairs, Sheikh Khalifa Bin Ali Al Harthy. The aim of the reunion was to strengthen political dialogue between both nations and expanding bilateral cooperation on issues of common interest.

== High-level visits ==
High-level visits from Mexico to Oman

- Director General for Africa and Middle East Ana Luisa Fajer (2008)
- Foreign Undersecretary Lourdes Aranda Bezaury (2012, 2013)
- Foreign Undersecretary María Teresa Mercado Pérez (2024)

== Agreements ==
Both nations signed a Memorandum of Understanding on the Establishment of a Common Interest Consultation Mechanism between the Mexican Secretariat of Foreign Affairs and the Omani Ministry of Foreign Affairs (2012).

== Trade ==
In 2023, trade between both nations totaled US$71.3 million. Mexico's main exports to Oman include: motor vehicles, telephones and mobile phones, machinery, chemical based products, fruits and nuts, sugar, honey, chocolate, rubber tires, and wristwatches. Oman's main exports to Mexico include: mineral or chemical nitrogenados, parts and accessories of motor vehicles, plates, sheets and strips; aluminum wire, articles for mosaics, hides and skins, and articles of jewelry.

== Diplomatic missions ==
- Mexico is accredited to Oman from its embassy in Riyadh, Saudi Arabia and maintains an honorary consulate in Muscat.
- Oman is accredited to Mexico from its embassy in Washington, D.C., United States and maintains an honorary consulate in Mexico City.

== See also ==
- Foreign relations of Mexico
- Foreign relations of Oman
