= Hassan Ibrahim Saqer =

Emirati footballer (born 1990)

Personal information
- Full name: Hassan Ibrahim Jumaa Hasan Saqer
- Date of birth: 19 October 1990 (age 36)
- Place of birth: Dubai, United Arab Emirates
- Position: Midfielder

Team information
- Current team: Hatta
- Number: 26

Senior career*
| Years | Team | Apps | (Gls) |
| 2010–2017 | Al Shabab | 114 | (3) |
| 2017–2020 | Shabab Al Ahli | 25 | (0) |
| 2020–2024 | Al Wasl | 61 | (0) |
| 2024–2025 | Ajman | 1 | (0) |
| 2025– | Hatta | 0 | (0) |

International career
| 2014– | United Arab Emirates | 7 | (0) |
- * Club domestic league appearances and goals as of 01:30, 17 January 2015 (UTC)

Hassan Ibrahim Saqer (born 19 October 1990) is an Emirati footballer who plays as a midfielder for Hatta.

== Honours ==
=== Club ===
Al Shabab

Winner

- UAE Arabian Gulf Cup: 2010–11
- GCC Champions League: 2011

Runner-up

- UAE President's Cup: 2012–13
- UAE Arabian Gulf Cup: 2011–12

=== International ===
UAE

Third place

- AFC Asian Cup: 2015
