= Pakistanis in Oman =

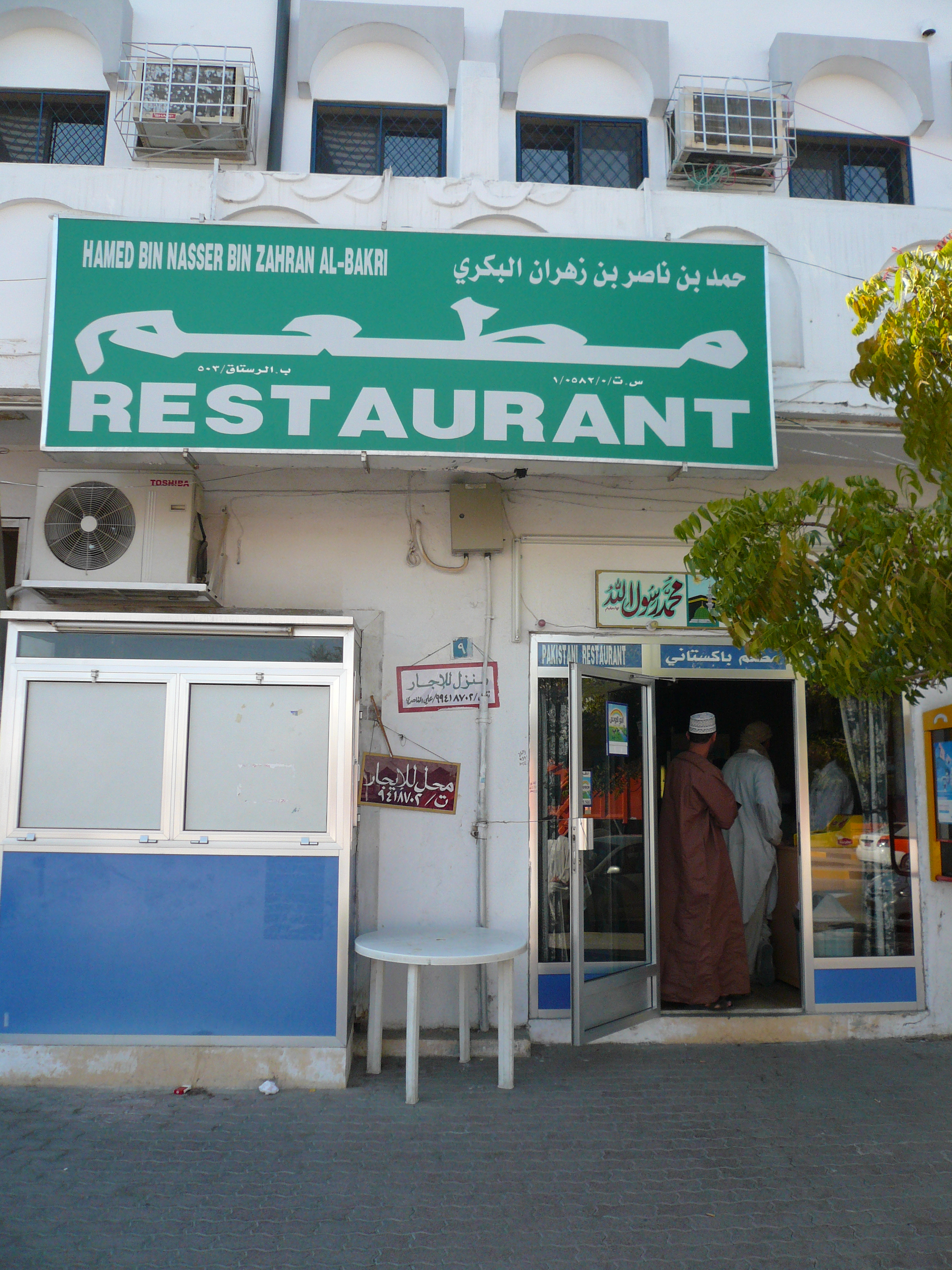
- A Pakistani restaurant in Rustaq

Total population
- 231,685 (November 2016)

Regions with significant populations
- Muscat

Languages
- Urdu, Pashto, Saraiki, Balochi, Arabic

Religion
- Islam

Pakistanis in Oman are Pakistani people who live in Oman, including Pakistani immigrants to Oman and people of Pakistani descent born in Oman. According to official government statistics published by the Sultanate of Oman, the population of Pakistani expatriates stood at 231,685 in November 2016.

== See also ==
- Al Balushi
