= Abdullah Jassim =

Emirati association football player (born 1997)

Abdullah Jassim عبد الله جاسم
Personal information
- Full name: Abdullah Jassim Ali Ahmed Khamis
- Date of birth: 22 February 1997 (age 29)
- Place of birth: Emirates
- Height: 1.89 m (6 ft 2 in)
- Position: Defender

Team information
- Current team: Hatta
- Number: 4

Youth career
- 2010–2015: Al-Wasl

Senior career*
Years	Team	Apps	(Gls)
2015–2023	Al-Wasl	36	(0)
2021–2022	→ Ajman (loan)	2	(0)
2022–2023	→ Hatta (loan)		
2023–2024	Baniyas	7	(0)
2024–	Hatta	0	(0)
- * Club domestic league appearances and goals

Abdullah Jassim (Arabic:عبد الله جاسم) (born 22 February 1997) is an Emirati footballer who plays as a defender for Hatta.

== Career ==
Abdullah Jassim started his career at Al-Wasl and is a product of the Al-Wasl's youth system. On 15 April 2017, Abdullah Jassim made his professional debut for Al-Wasl against Al-Ain in the Pro League, replacing Ahmed Al Shamisi.
