= Malaysia–Oman relations =

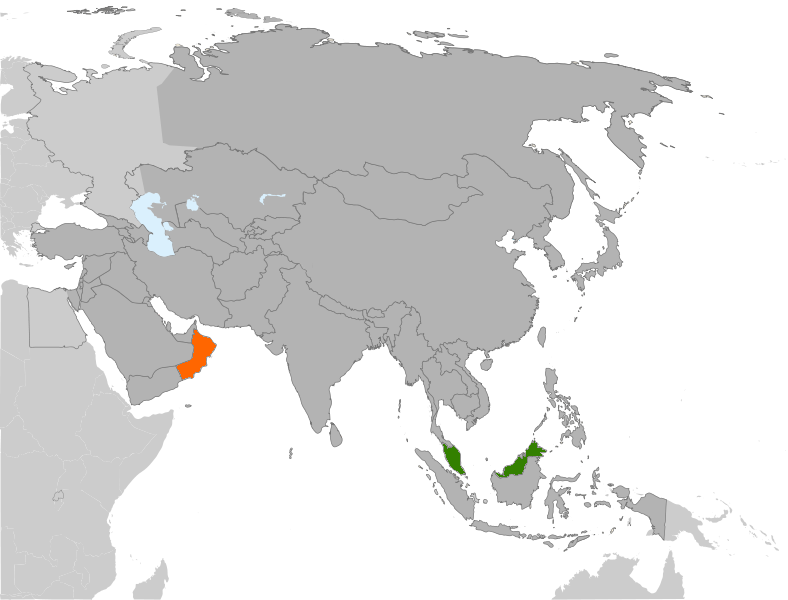

- Malaysia: Oman

Diplomatic mission
- Malaysian Embassy, Muscat: Omani Embassy, Kuala Lumpur

Malaysia–Oman relations refers to the bilateral relations between Malaysia and Oman. Malaysia has an embassy in Muscat, and Oman has an embassy in Kuala Lumpur. Both countries are members of the Organisation of Islamic Cooperation.

== History ==
Official diplomatic relations were established on 15 January 1982., Embassy of Malaysia in Muscat was established on 17 February 1983. On 3 March 1982, Malaysian Prime Minister Mahathir Mohamad made an official visit to Oman.

Oman established its embassy in Kuala Lumpur in April 1984.

== Economic relations ==
The total trade between the two countries grew from $28.1 million in 1995 to $1.06 billion in 2006 with Malaysia's exports to Oman increased from $26.4 million to $108 million and imports expanded from $1.7 million to $956 million. In 2009, a memorandum of understanding (MoU) was signed between Malaysia and Oman to improve co-ordination of trade and small and medium-sized enterprises (SMEs).

Trade stood at nearly RM500 million during January–October 2010, with Malaysia's main exports to Oman being edible oil, machinery, appliances and parts, wood products, electrical and electronic products. Oman and Malaysia signed an agreement for Oman to import frozen chicken from Malaysia, costing RM120 million. Oman imports most of its food, up to 80%.

In 2011, Shell Malaysia Trading Sdn Bhd (SMTSB) signed a sale and purchase agreement with Oman's National Gas Co SAOG (NGC) to divest its liquefied petroleum gas (LPG) business in West Malaysia at an undisclosed amount. An agreement in cyber security co-operation was also signed between the two countries in 2015.

As of 2013, there are around 1,300 Omani students in Malaysia with 30,000 tourists from Oman have visiting Malaysia, while 1,000 Malaysians are working in Oman mainly in oil and gas, construction medical and as academicians. As of 2017, both countries are working to increase their trade relationship. In 2022, Omani ambassador Sheikh Al-Abbas Ibrahim Hamed Al Harthi said that the countries continue to have a positive relationship.

== Transport ==
Oman Air operates direct flights between Muscat and Kuala Lumpur and from Muscat to Penang.

== See also ==
- Foreign relations of Malaysia
- Foreign relations of Oman
