= Abdullah Kazim =

Emirati footballer (born 1996)

Personal information
- Full name: Abdullah Mohammed Kazim
- Date of birth: 31 July 1996 (age 30)
- Place of birth: United Arab Emirates
- Height: 1.73 m (5 ft 8 in)
- Position: Winger

Team information
- Current team: Hatta
- Number: 12

Youth career
- Al-Wasl

Senior career*
Years	Team	Apps	(Gls)
2014–2021	Al Wasl	23	(1)
2019–2021	→ Hatta (loan)	33	(3)
2021–2022	Sharjah	4	(0)
2022–2023	Al Bataeh	8	(0)
2023–2024	Al-Wahda	3	(0)
2024–	Hatta	12	(0)

International career
2020–	United Arab Emirates	1	(0)
- * Club domestic league appearances and goals

Abdullah Kazim (Arabic:عبد الله كاظم; born 31 July 1996) is an Emirati association football player who plays for Hatta.
