= Iranian Hospital, Dubai =

Coordinates: 25.22995°N 55.26921°E

- Dubai Health Authority
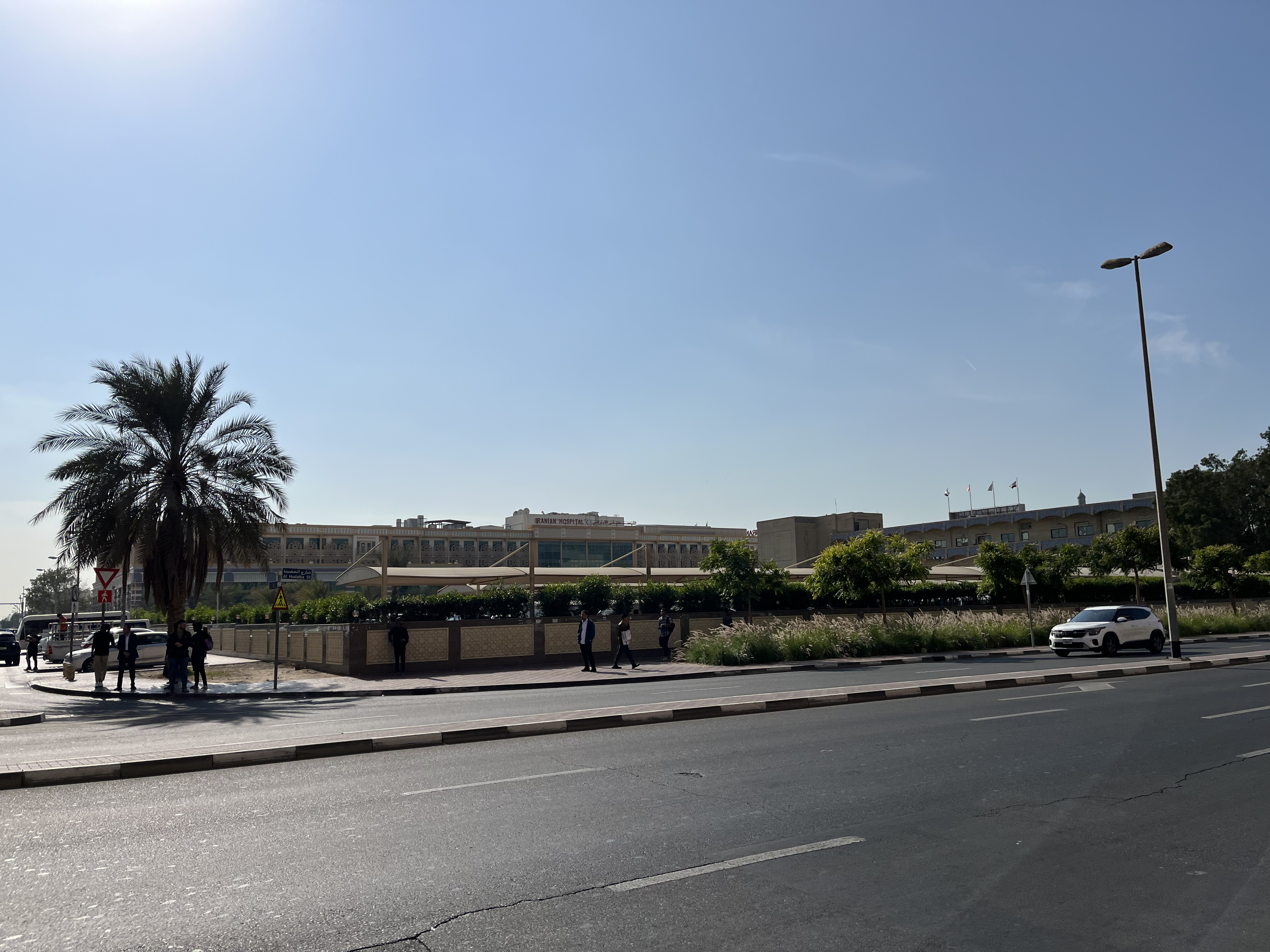

Geography
- Location: Al Wasl Road, Jumeirah, Dubai, United Arab Emirates

Organisation
- Type: District General

Services
- Emergency department: Yes
- Beds: 220

History
- Opened: 1972

Links
- Lists: Hospitals in United Arab Emirates

The Iranian Hospital (Arabic: المستشفى الإيراني) is a private non-profit 220 bed general hospital in Dubai located on the Al Wasl Road in Jumeirah. Opened on 14 April 1972, it was built by the Red Lion and Sun Society (now known as the Iranian Red Crescent Society) on land donated by Sheikh Rashid bin Saeed Al Maktoum to serve the Iranian community in the United Arab Emirates.

The hospital building features an exterior of blue tilework inspired by Persian architecture, similar to the Iranian Mosque located across the road.

== Background ==
Construction on the hospital began in 1970 on land donated to the Iranian Red Crescent Society (Red Lion and Sun Society) by Sheikh Rashid Bin Saeed Al Maktoum. The Iranian Hospital is accredited by Accreditation Canada and has received a Qmentum International Platinum rating from the body. It has the capability to serve over 2500 outpatients per day.

In October 2014, the hospital opened a new facility for sub-specialty health care services. Amenities of the new extension include:

- 220 premium in-patient bed
- 35 specialty clinics
- A gastro-endoscopy center
- A diagnostic-imaging center
- 8 operation rooms equipped with technology for laparoscopic and minimally invasive surgery
- A fully automated advanced laboratory

== Out-patient clinics and departments ==
- General Physicians Clinics

Internal Medicine Specialty and Sub-Specialty Clinics including:

- Infectious Disease
- Neurology
- Neuro-Lab Center
- Endocrinology
- Pulmonary
- Rheumatology
- Digestive System
- Endoscopy

Surgical:

- Orthopedic
- Urology
- Pediatric
- Neurosurgery
- ENT

Ophthalmology:

- Optical Laser Department
- OCT

Cosmetic and Aesthetic:

- Cosmetic and Aesthetic Surgery
- Dermatology Specialty and Sub-Specialty
- Skin Laser Center
- Follicular Transplantation Center
- Slimming and Body Contouring Unit

Pediatric:

- General Pediatrics
- Neonatal
- Neonate Screening Tests
- Vaccination
- Pediatric Pulmonology
- Pediatric Hematology
- Pediatric Gastroenterology
- Pediatric Endocrinology
- Pediatric and Neonatal Surgery

Women Personalized Specialty Services:

- Gynecology
- Obstetrics
- NST
- Colposcopy
- Breast Clinic

Cardiology:

- Cardiology
- Echocardiography
- Exercise Test
- ECG
- Holter Monitoring

Psychiatry:

- General Psychiatric Services
- Child and Adolescent Psychiatry
- Psychology Services and Consultations
- Repetitive Transcranial Magnetic Stimulation Therapy

Dentistry:

- General Dentistry
- Orthodontics
- Dental Implantation

== In-patient services ==
- 24 Hour Emergency Department Services
- ICU
- CCU
- Internal Medicine Ward
- Global Healthcare Services Department for medical tourists
- Male and Female Surgical Wards
- Day Care Surgery Wards
- Operation Theater
- Cath-Lab
- Gynecology and Obstetrics Ward
- Labor Ward
- Neonatal ICU
- Pediatric Ward
- Pediatric ICU

== Awards ==
Iranian Hospital was presented with an Honorable Mention award at the Dubai Police Golden Jubilee for its cooperation with the department.

== See also ==
- Iranian Red Crescent Society
- List of hospitals in Dubai
- Iranian Club, Dubai
