= Oman–Russia relations =

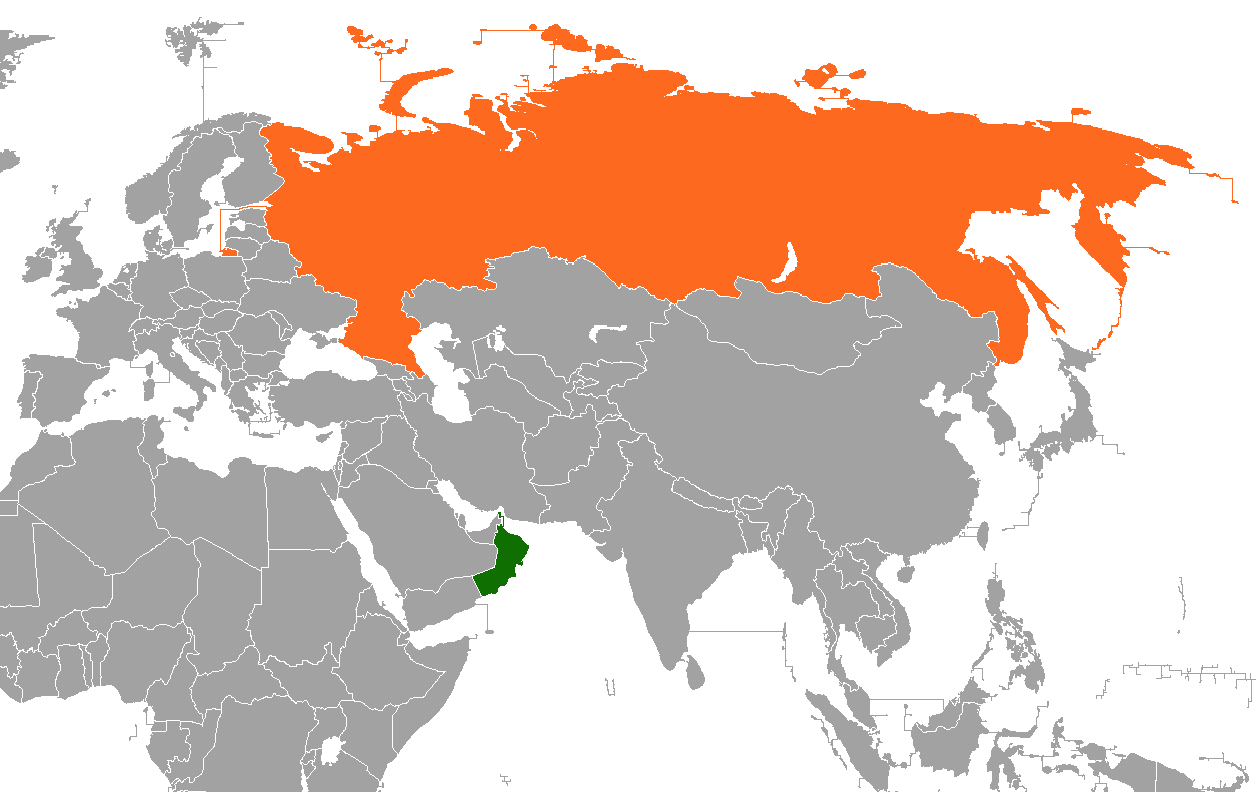

- Oman: Russia

Oman–Russia relations (Russian: Российско-оманские отношения) is the bilateral relationship between Russia and Oman. Russia has an embassy in Muscat. Oman is represented in Russia through its embassy in Moscow. Oman was allied to the west during the Cold War. The Soviet Union supported Marxist rebels like the Popular Front for the Liberation of Oman in Oman during the Dhofar Rebellion in the 1960s and 1970s, resulting in bad relations between Oman and the Soviets. The rebels were crushed with British help by the Omani government. Oman did not maintain relations with the Soviets during this time. After a long period, Oman and the Soviet Union established diplomatic relations on February 5, 1986, and still maintain mostly neutral relations.

== Twenty-first century ==
Since a breakthrough OPEC deal, Oman and Russia have been active allies in the Persian Gulf.

In 2022, mutual trade between Russia and Oman grew by 46 percent as the two countries sought to expand economic ties, according to a Russian minister quoted by Reuters.

== See also ==
- Foreign relations of Russia
- Foreign relations of Oman
- List of ambassadors of Russia to Oman
