= Mai Al Balushi =

Kuwaiti actress

- Born: Mai Jassim Al Balushi; 14 September 1972 (age 53); Kuwait
- Occupation: Actor
- Years active: 2003 – present

Mai Al Balushi (Arabic: مي البلوشي; born September 14, 1972) is a Kuwaiti actress. She started her career in 2003 on stage and on TV. Her five sisters, two of whom are actresses Maram and Hind Al Balushi, and she is the cousin of actress Haya Al Shuaibi. She currently works as a nurse.
