= Maram Al Balushi =

Kuwaiti singer and actress

- مرام البلوشي
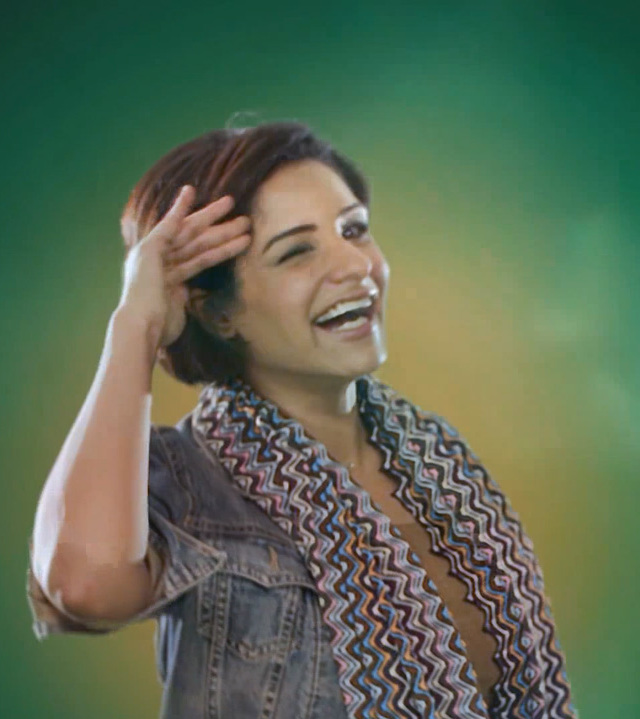
- Born: February 2, 1973 (age 53)
- Occupation: singer

Maram Al Balushi (Arabic: مرام البلوشي; born February 2, 1973) is a Kuwaiti singer and actress. She initially sang before she started acting. She has had leading parts in several Kuwaiti television series.

== Life ==
Al Balushi was born in 1979 and she has elder and younger sisters, May and Hind, who are also actors. Her father was known for playing the Oud. Her first recording was an album titled Not Cheating in 1997.

In 2000 she appeared on stage for the first time in the play, Baby, for children where she also sang.

In 2009 she won a prize of 30,000 pounds and a Golden Creativity award at the Cairo Arab Media Festival. The award was for her work on a Kuwaiti evening TV show. It was one of seven awards given to Kuwaitis that year.

In 2017 the “Distinguished in Ramadan” festival awards took place in Salmiya. She was judged best actress in a leading role for her part in The Black Day which was also judged the best drama and Reem Arhama was best gulf actress for her part. In 2019 she was the leading actress in Dofaat Al-Qahira which tells the story of Kuwait students who get to attend Cairo University during the 1950s.

She appeared in the Kuwaiti TV series Beit Bayut (house of houses) which was completed during the coronavirus precautions in 2020. She was also included in the TV series The Universe in a Palm and My Dear Father that year.

In 2021 she was filming another TV series when she was taken to Al-Amiri Hospital following a heart attack. This was not her first scare as she had heart problems in 2019 while filming, Dofaat Al-Qahira, in Egypt.

== Private life ==
In 2017 she confirmed that she was divorced.
