= Oman–Pakistan relations =

- Pakistan: Oman

Oman–Pakistan relations are warm and cooperative. Oman has an embassy in Islamabad and a Consulate-General in Karachi, whereas Pakistan has an embassy in Muscat.

Oman is the nearest Arab country to Pakistan, because of this, they both share a maritime boundary with each other. 30% of Omanis are of Balochi origin from Pakistan's Balochistan province, having settled in Oman over a hundred years ago. Gwadar was formerly part of Oman but was sold to Pakistan on 8 September 1958. It was integrated within Balochistan on 1 July 1977 and became a full sub-division of the Gwadar District. There are over 85,000 Pakistani immigrants resident in Oman.

Oman and Pakistan cooperate economically, with bilateral trade of $331 million as of 2008–2009. The Pakistan-Oman Joint Investment Company promotes trade between Oman and Pakistan.

The countries also cooperate militarily, with joint exercises and defence procurement.

== Arabian Sea diplomacy ==
Oman agreed to a transaction for Gwadar Port which is now being developed as a part of China-Pakistan Economic Corridor. Oman and Pakistan also co-operated regarding Pakistan's extended continental shelf zone, Pakistan's Foreign affairs adviser Sartaj Aziz thanked Oman for their co-operation regarding extension of Pakistan's territorial waters from 240,000 km^{2} to an additional 50,000 km^{2}.

== Kashmir conflict ==
In May 2023, Pakistan praised Oman for boycotting a G20 tourism meeting held by India in Kashmir.

== See also ==
- Pakistanis in Oman
