= Mubarak Al-Beloushi =

Qatari footballer (born 1986)

Personal information
- Full name: Mubarak Rashteh Al-Beloushi
- Date of birth: April 28, 1984 (age 42)
- Place of birth: Doha, Qatar
- Height: 1.85 m (6 ft 1 in)
- Position: Midfielder

Senior career*
Years	Team	Apps	(Gls)
2002–2008	Al Rayyan	89	(2)
2008–2009	Al-Saliya	16	(0)
2009	Al Rayyan	3	(0)
2009–2010	Al Ahli	6	(0)
2010–2011	Qatar SC	3	(0)
2011–2012	Umm Salal	4	(0)
2015–2017	Al-Shahania	2	(0)
Total		123	(2)

International career
2004	Qatar	5	(0)
- * Club domestic league appearances and goals

Mubark Al-Beloushi (born March 22, 1986, in Doha) is a retired Qatari footballer who played as a defensive midfielder. He was a member of the Qatar national football team. As a player, he spent a substantial part of his career with Qatar's Al Rayyan club.
