= Hamdan Humaid =

Emirati association football player (born 2002)

Hamdan Humaid حمدان حميد
Personal information
- Full name: Hamdan Humaid Hassan Ahmed
- Date of birth: 6 November 2002 (age 24)
- Place of birth: Emirates
- Height: 1.72 m (5 ft 8 in)
- Position: Midfielder

Team information
- Current team: Khor Fakkan
- Number: 28

Youth career
- –2020: Shabab Al Ahli

Senior career*
Years	Team	Apps	(Gls)
2020–	Shabab Al Ahli	4	(0)
2024	→ Al-Fujairah (loan)		
2024–	Khor Fakkan	15	(4)
- * Club domestic league appearances and goals as of 12:50, 30 December 2020 (UTC)

Hamdan Humaid (Arabic: حمدان حميد; born 6 November 2002) is an Emirati professional footballer who plays as a midfielder for Khor Fakkan.

== Career statistics ==
=== Club ===
As of 30 December 2020.

== Career statistics ==
Club	Season	League			Cup		Continental		Other		Total	
Club	Season	Division	Apps	Goals	Apps	Goals	Apps	Goals	Apps	Goals	Apps	Goals
Shabab Al-Ahli	2020–21	UAE Pro League	2	0	1	0	—		—		3	0
Career totals			2	0	1	0	0	0	0	0	3	0
