= Oman–Qatar relations =

- Qatar: Oman

Oman–Qatar relations are the bilateral relations between the Sultanate of Oman and the State of Qatar. Both are members of the GCC.

== Diplomatic representation ==
Qatar's ambassador to Oman was Ali bin Fahad Al Hajri in 2017. Najib bin Yahya al-Balushi was ambassador of Oman to Qatar as of 2017.

== Diplomatic visits ==
Sultan Qaboos paid a visit to Qatar as early as July 1972, less than one year after Qatar gained independence, and only two years after he assumed power.

Qatari Emir Hamad bin Khalifa Al-Thani spent three days in Oman on an official capacity in February 2001.

On 22 April 2010, Emir Tamim bin Hamad Al Thani visited Oman for two days. His visit was part of a joint effort to boost bilateral relations between the two countries.

== Political relations ==
=== 2017 Qatari diplomatic crisis ===
Oman became the main transit gateway to Qatar after several Persian Gulf countries cut sea routes to Qatar during the 2017 Qatar diplomatic crisis. Following the onset of the crisis in June 2017, most Qatari-destined goods flowed through the Port of Salalah and Sohar Port. Two direct shipping lines between these two ports and Qatar's Hamad Port were launched the same month. When Qatar Airways was banned from Saudi airspace, Oman stepped in and transported Saudi-based Qataris back to Doha. At the official level, Oman remained uninvolved in the dispute.

=== 2019 AFC Asian Cup ===
Throughout the 2019 AFC Asian Cup, Qataris were forbidden to travel to the UAE. Omanis had offered and acted as unofficial supporters of Qatar throughout the tournament, providing the Qatari team big backup as Omanis were found to have celebrated anytime Qatar scored. After the tournament which Qatar earned their maiden trophy, Qatari footballer Abdelkarim Hassan posted his thanks to the kindness of Omani fans, boosting the strong Omani–Qatari relationship.

== Economic relations ==
The volume of trade between Qatar and Oman in 2016 was valued at $814 million.

In September 2017, trade volume between the two countries was reported to have increased by 2,000% since June, when the 2017 Qatari diplomatic crisis started. This translated to trade transactions worth $702 million.

== Migration ==
There were roughly 6,000 Omanis residing in Qatar in the 1970s.
