= Iranian Mosque, Satwa =

Mosque in Al Satwa, Dubai, United Arab Emirates

Iranian Mosque
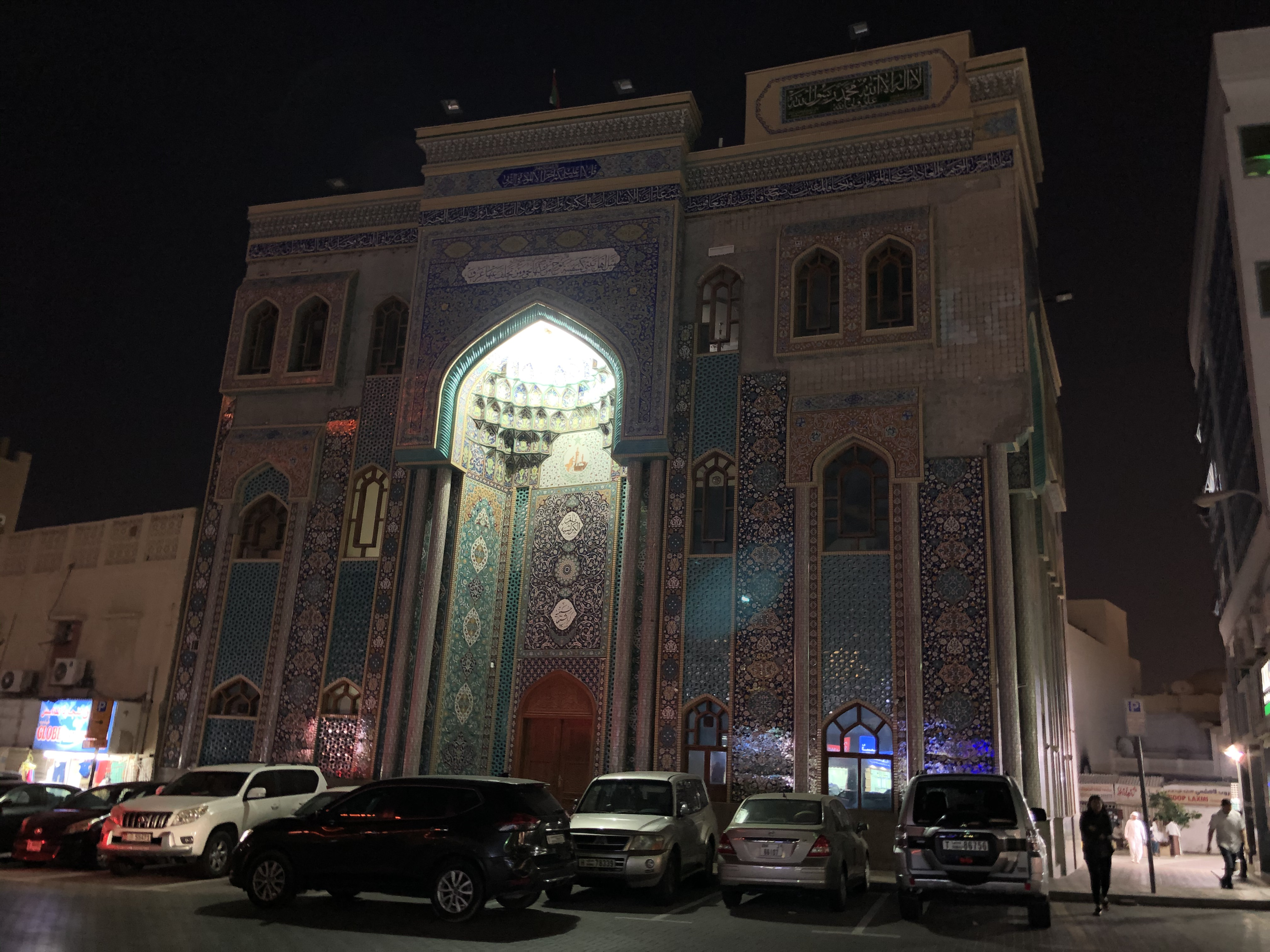

- Location on the mosque in Dubai

Religion
- Affiliation: Shia (Twelver)
- Ecclesiastical or organizational status: Hosainia
- Status: Active

Location
- Location: Al Wasl Road, Al Satwa (near Jumeirah), Dubai
- Country: United Arab Emirates
- Interactive map of Iranian Mosque
- Coordinates: 25°13′56″N 55°16′39″E

Architecture
- Type: Mosque architecture
- Style: Persian; Quasi-Fatimid
- Completed: 1979

The Iranian Mosque (also known as the Imam Hussein Mosque) is a Twelver Shia hosainia, located in Satwa, Dubai, in the United Arab Emirates. The mosque was founded in 1979 by the Iranian community.

It is located on Al Wasl Road, a short distance from the Jumeirah Mosque. Its architecture is inspired by quasi-Fatimid and Persian influences, with its facade and dome covered in traditional blue tiles, much like the exterior of the Iranian Hospital across the road. The mosque sprawls over an area of 2,500 square metres (27,000 sq ft) and was built in 1979 with the support of the Iranian Red Crescent. It contains several interior halls and rooms, and has a library with over 14,000 books of diverse topics and languages including Arabic, Persian, Urdu and English. The Sheikh Mohammed Centre for Cultural Understanding runs four weekly tours of the mosque, during which non-Muslims visitors can visit.

== See also ==
- Shia Islam in the United Arab Emirates
- List of mosques in the United Arab Emirates
