= Mansoor Al-Baloushi =

Emirati footballer (born 1991)

Personal information
- Full name: Mansoor Mohammed Abbas Al-Baloushi
- Date of birth: 18 March 1991 (age 35)
- Place of birth: United Arab Emirates
- Height: 1.75 m (5 ft 9 in)
- Position: Midfielder

Team information
- Current team: Dibba Al-Hisn
- Number: 2

Youth career
- Al Ittihad Kalba

Senior career*
Years	Team	Apps	(Gls)
2010–2013	Kalba	30	(1)
2013–2015	Ajman	34	(3)
2015–2017	Al-Shaab	21	(0)
2017–2023	Kalba	61	(6)
2022–2023	→ Dibba Al Fujairah (loan)	12	(0)
2023–2024	Hatta	13	(0)
2024–2025	Al Arabi		
2025–	Dibba Al-Hisn		

International career
2019	UAE		
- * Club domestic league appearances and goals

Mansoor Al-Baloushi (Arabic:منصور البلوشي; born 18 March 1991) is an Emirati footballer who plays as a midfielder for Dibba Al-Hisn.
