= Fatima bint Mohammed Al Balooshi =

Bahraini politician

Fatima bint Mohammed Al Balooshi is the Minister of Social Development and was the former acting Minister of Health of Bahrain.

== Biography ==
Fatima bint Mohammed Al Balooshi is the Minister of Social Development and was the former acting Minister of Health. She led the Bahraini delegation to the 64th session of the World Health organisation in Geneva, Switzerland on 24 May 2011. The Ministry of Social Development under her opened the Bahrain Scientific Centre, it was inaugurated by Shaikha Hessa bint Khalifa Al-Khalifa on 29 April 2013.

During the Bahraini protests of 2011–13, Fatima bint Mohammed Al Balooshi denied any allegation that the government of Bahrain was abusing detainees and protesters. She accused some doctors of deliberately wounding protestors and/or killing them. In Bahrain 14 doctors were arrested on those allegations. The doctors were visited by a team of Irish team which included David Andrews, the former Minister of Foreign Affairs of Ireland and Marian Harkin, Member of European Parliament. The visiting Irish team refuted the allegations of Fatima and declared the finding of credible evidence prisoners were tortured. The Forbes Middle East placed her on a list of 200 most powerful Arab women in government. Since 17 March 2011 she had announced charges against 23 doctors and 24 nurses. She also allegedly misquoted UN High Commissioner for Human Rights (UNHCHR) Navi Pillay to make it appear the meeting was favorable to Bahrain's handling of protests.
