= Iranian Business Council - Dubai =

The Iranian Business Council - Dubai is a business council formed by Iranian expatriates in Dubai, United Arab Emirates. The council promotes trade relations between Iran and the United Arab Emirates.

== See also ==
- Iranian Club, Dubai
- Iran–United Arab Emirates relations
