= Hamad Al-Balooshi =

Emirati footballer (born 1995)

Personal information
- Full name: Hamad Mohammed Al-Balooshi
- Date of birth: 15 July 1995 (age 31)
- Place of birth: United Arab Emirates
- Height: 1.82 m (5 ft 11 1/2 in)
- Position: Midfielder

Team information
- Current team: Emirates
- Number: 6

Youth career
- 2007–2016: Al-Ahli

Senior career*
Years	Team	Apps	(Gls)
2016–2022	Al-Wasl	61	(0)
2022–2023	Ajman	0	(0)
2023–2026	Al Bataeh	16	(0)
2026–	Emirates		
- * Club domestic league appearances and goals

Hamad Al-Balooshi (Arabic:حمد البلوشي) (born 15 July 1995) is an Emirati footballer. He currently plays as a midfielder for Emirates.
