= Ahmed Bin Mahmoud Al Blooshi =

Emirati political advisor (1923–2021)

Ahmed Al Mahmoud Al Blooshi
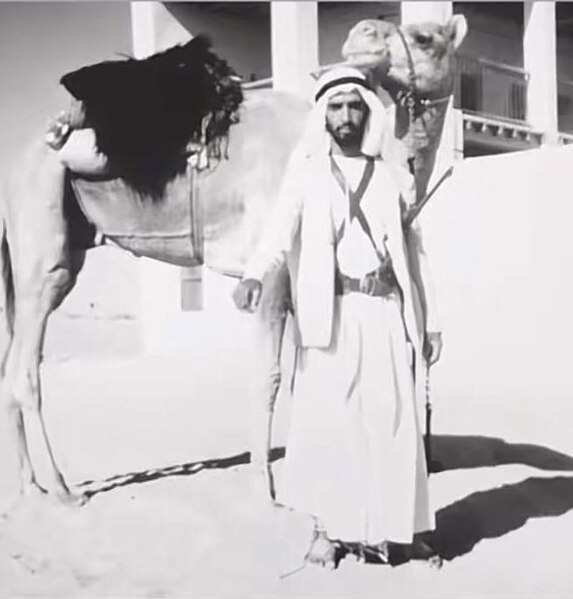
- Ahmed in Al Ain, 1960
- Born: 1923; Al Ain, United Arab Emirates
- Died: 2 March 2021 (aged 97–98)

Ahmed bin Mahmoud Al Mahmoud Al Blooshi was the private secretary and political advisor to the founding father of the United Arab Emirates, Sheikh Zayed bin Sultan Al Nahyan. Al Blooshi was born in the city of Al Ain in 1923 (1342 AH), moving to Buraimi at the age of seven.

His father operated camel trains taking pilgrims to Hajj, a business Al Blooshi helped with. He began working for Sheikh Zayed in 1958, following the death of his father. Zayed is reported to have told Blooshi "If your father has died, I am your father now."

Al Blooshi managed Zayed's correspondence as well as making preparations for the annual hunting trips Zayed undertook. He acted as Zayed's representative at community events such as weddings and funerals and frequently arbitrated in disputes acting in Zayed's name. He moved to Abu Dhabi with Zayed on Zayed's accession as ruler of Abu Dhabi in 1966, continuing to serve as his secretary until 1973. He continued to act as an advisor to Zayed after that time.

Al Blooshi served as a member of the Abu Dhabi Consultative Council, a member of the Al Ain Municipal Council, and a member of the UAE Marriage Fund. He died in April 2021.

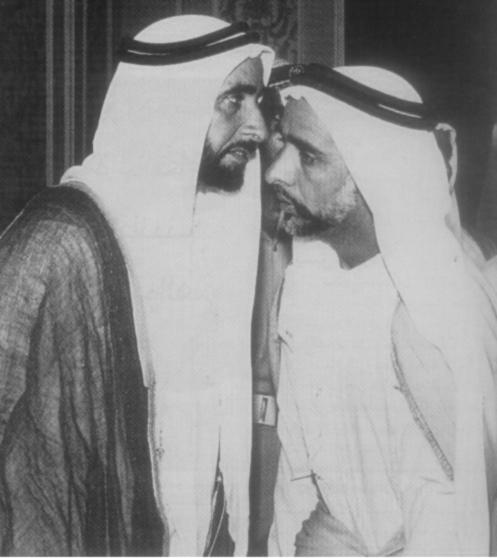
(From left to right) Sheikh Zayed bin Sultan Al Nahyan and Ahmed Al Mahmoud Al Balushi.
