= Hamed Al-Balushi =

Omani footballer (born 1980)

Personal information
- Full name: Hamed Hamdan Al-Balushi
- Date of birth: 21 March 1980 (age 46)
- Place of birth: Oman
- Position: Striker

Team information
- Current team: Fanja

Senior career*
Years	Team	Apps	(Gls)
- Fanja

International career
2007–	Oman	1	
- * Club domestic league appearances and goals

Hamed Hamdan Al-Balushi (Arabic: حامد حمدان البلوشي; born 2 March 1980), commonly known as Hamed Al-Balushi, is an Omani footballer who plays for Fanja SC.

== Club career statistics ==
Club	Season	Division	League		Cup		Continental (Note: Includes appearances in the AFC Cup)		Other		Total	
Club	Season	Division	Apps	Goals	Apps	Goals	Apps	Goals	Apps	Goals	Apps	Goals
Fanja	2012–13	Oman Elite League	-	0	-	0	2	0	-	0	-	0
Fanja	Total		-	0	-	0	2	0	-	0	-	0
Career total			-	0	-	0	2	0	-	0	-	0

== International career ==
Hamed was selected for the national team for the first time in 2007. He has represented the national team in the 2007 AFC Asian Cup.
