= Azan Al-Balushi =

Omani footballer (born 1990)

Personal information
- Full name: Azan Abbas Sabil Al-Balushi
- Date of birth: 5 May 1990 (age 36)
- Place of birth: Oman
- Position: Left back

Team information
- Current team: Al-Nasr

Senior career*
Years	Team	Apps	(Gls)
2011–2012	Al-Musannah	?	(0)
2012–2013	Al-Shabab	?	(0)
2013	Saham	?	(1)
2014–2015	Al-Musannah		(1)
Jan 2016	Al-Nasr		

International career
2012–	Oman	2	(0)
- * Club domestic league appearances and goals

Azan Abbas Sabil Al-Balushi (Arabic: عزان بن عباس البلوشي; born 5 May 1990), commonly known as Azan Al-Balushi, is an Omani footballer who plays for Al-Nasr in Oman Professional League.

== Club career statistics ==
Club	Season	Division	League		Cup		Continental		Other		Total	
Club	Season	Division	Apps	Goals	Apps	Goals	Apps	Goals	Apps	Goals	Apps	Goals
Saham	2013–14	Oman Professional League	-	1	-	0	0	0	-	0	-	1
Saham	Total		-	1	-	0	0	0	-	0	-	1
Career total			-	1	-	0	0	0	-	0	-	1

== International career ==
Azan is part of the first team squad of the Oman national football team. He was selected for the national team for the first time in 2012. He made his first appearance for Oman on 8 November 2012 in a friendly match against Estonia in 2012. He has represented the national team in the 2014 FIFA World Cup qualification and in the 2015 AFC Asian Cup qualification.
