= Khalid Al-Baloushi =

Emirati footballer (born 1999)

Khalid Al-Baloushi خالد البلوشي
Personal information
- Full name: Khalid Mohammed Hussein Mousa Ali Abdulkareem Ali Haider Al-Balushi
- Date of birth: 22 March 1999 (age 27)
- Place of birth: Emirates
- Height: 1.74 m (5 ft 9 in)
- Position: Defensive midfielder

Team information
- Current team: Dibba
- Number: 18

Youth career
- -2018: Al Ain

Senior career*
Years	Team	Apps	(Gls)
2018–2025	Al Ain	76	(3)
2025–	Dibba	2	(0)

International career
2022–	United Arab Emirates	2	(0)
- * Club domestic league appearances and goals as of 30 December 2021

Khalid Al-Balushi (Arabic: خَالِدُ مُحَمَّدُ حُسَيْنُ مُوسَى عَلِيُّ عَبْدُ الْكَرِيمِ عَلِيُّ حَيْدَرُ الْبَلُوشِيُّ; born 22 March 1999) is an Emirati footballer who plays as a defensive midfielder for Dibba.

== Honours ==
Al Ain

- UAE Pro League: 2021-22
- UAE League Cup: 2021-22
- FIFA Club World Cup runner-up: 2018
- AFC Champions League: 2023-24
