= Khalid Abdulla (footballer) =

Emirati association football player (born 1997)

Khalid Abdulla خالد عبد الله
Personal information
- Full name: Khalid Abdulla Mubarak Al-Baloushi
- Date of birth: 18 May 1997 (age 29)
- Place of birth: Emirates
- Height: 1.77 m (5 ft 10 in)
- Position: Defender

Team information
- Current team: Dibba
- Number: 35

Youth career
- –2016: Al-Fujairah

Senior career*
Years	Team	Apps	(Gls)
2016–2020	Al-Fujairah	24	(2)
2020–2021	Khor Fakkan	0	(0)
2021–	Dibba	0	(0)
- * Club domestic league appearances and goals

Khalid Abdulla Mubarak Al-Baloushi (Arabic: خالد عبد الله البلوشي; born 18 May 1997) is an Emirati footballer. He currently plays as a defender for Dibba.

== Career ==
=== Al-Fujairah ===
Khalid Abdulla started his career at Al-Fujairah and is a product of the Al-Fujairah's youth system. On 31 August 2018, Khalid Abdulla made his professional debut for Al-Fujairah against Baniyas in the Pro League.

=== Khor Fakkan ===
On 31 May 2020, he left Al-Fujairah and signed with Khor Fakkan.
