= Ajam Emiratis =

الإماراتيون العجم

Regions with significant populations
- United Arab Emirates · Dubai · Sharjah · Kalba · Khor Fakkan · Ajman · Ras Al Khaimah

Languages
- Arabic (Emirati, Modern Standard), Achomi, Farsi, Kumzari, Balochi

Religion
- Islam (Sunni Islam, Shia Islam)

Related ethnic groups
- Other Iranic Peoples; Emiratis, Ajam, Achomis, Afro-Emiratis, Huwala, Iranian Arabs, Kumzaris, Baluchis, Baharna

Ajam Emiratis (Standard Arabic: الإماراتيون العجم), also referred to as Eyam Emiratis (Gulf Arabic: الإماراتيين العيم; Achomi: خُودمونی), Iranian Emiratis, are Emiratis of Iranian descent. The majority trace their ancestral roots to southern Iran, particularly the historical Irahistan, including the provinces of Fars and Hormozgan and the native Achomi people. Many Ajam are also of Persian, Afro-Iranian, Huwali and Bahrani origin. The Ajam constitute the majority of the Bedoon population, many whom hold Comoran passports due to a deal between the governments of the UAE and Comoros. Some accounts estimate up to 40% – 60% of the Emirati population being of Persian origin, of which most are settled in Dubai.

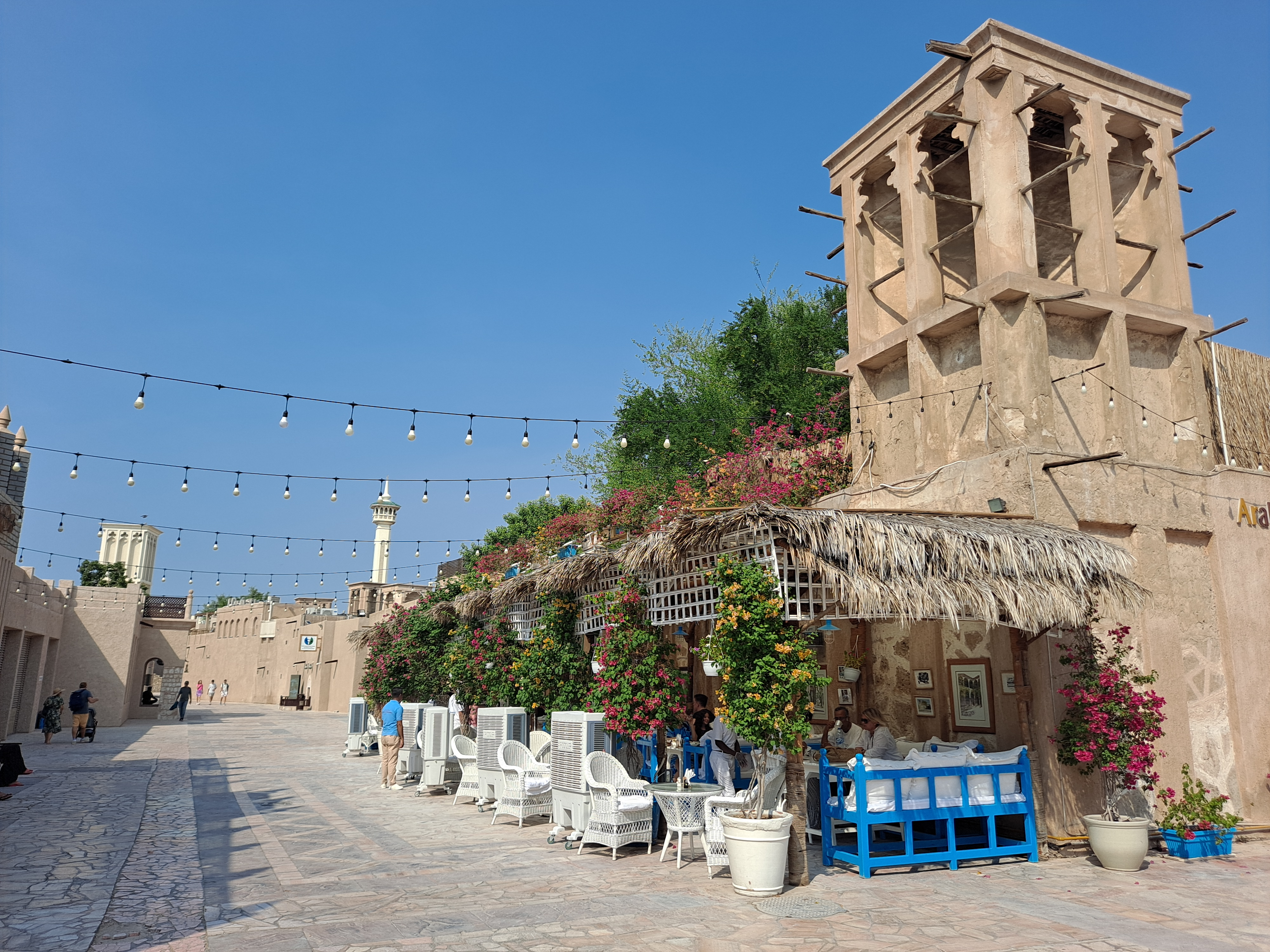
Al Bastakiya, Dubai, AE.

Persian migration to Eastern Arabia—including the area that is now the United Arab Emirates—has occurred over centuries and reflects deep, longstanding ties shaped by geography, commerce, and imperial history. In antiquity, the region was known as Magan and later Mazun, and it came under the influence or direct control of various Persian empires, including the Achaemenid, Parthian, and Sassanian dynasties. The area was also an active trading partner of ancient Elam. Persian influence in the region extended far beyond military or political domination, encompassing trade, seafaring, and cultural exchange. These connections were further reinforced by the Kingdom of Hormuz, a powerful maritime state that dominated both shores of the Persian Gulf, and the Qawasim which helped solidify the economic and cultural integration of Persian and Eastern Arabian communities.

== History ==
The presence of Persian-speaking populations in Eastern Arabia dates back several millennia. In antiquity, the territory corresponding to the modern United Arab Emirates was known to ancient Persians as Magan and later Mazun, both of which were integrated into the administrative and commercial spheres of successive Iranian empires. During the Achaemenid, Parthian, and particularly Sasanian periods, Persian rulers exerted influence over the Gulf littoral. The Sasanian monarch Ardashir I (r. 224–242 CE) incorporated the region as the province of Mazun and placed it under the authority of his son Shapur I.

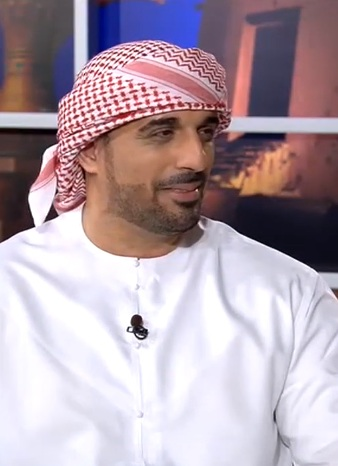
Moein Al Bastaki on Fujeirah TV.

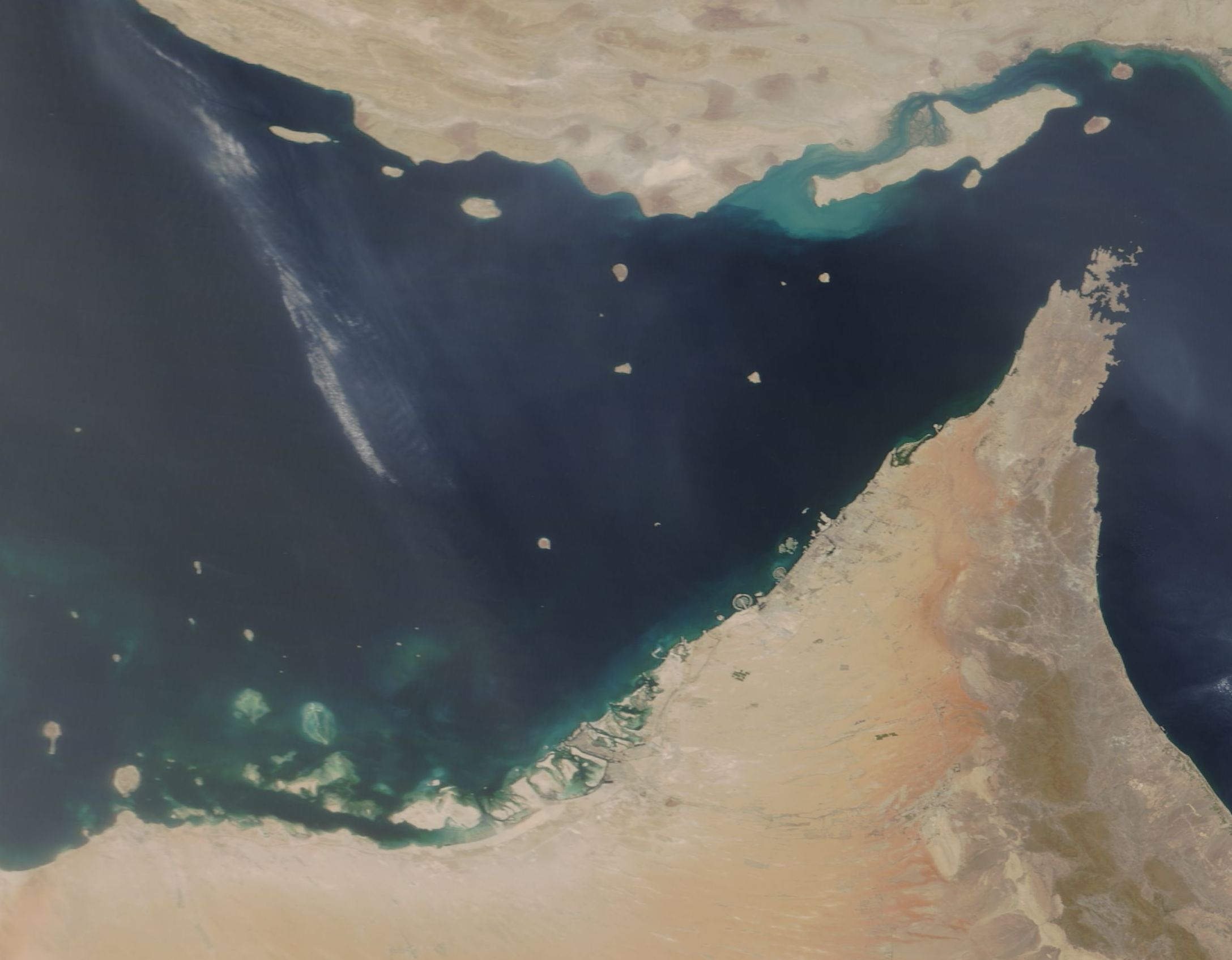
United Arab Emirates and Southern Iran

Archaeological evidence—including coins, seals, and inscriptions—testifies to robust exchange between Persian territories and Eastern Arabia in the pre-Islamic era. The region participated in long-distance trade networks facilitated by Persian-speaking and Arabian administrators, merchant

Mahdi Ali, former coach of the UAE national team.

s, and soldiers. These interactions built the foundation for enduring cultural and commercial connectivity across the Gulf.

The Islamization of the region in the 7th century marked a shift in political sovereignty, yet Persian influence in the Gulf persisted through evolving channels. During the medieval and early modern periods, the Persian-speaking Kingdom of Hormuz, situated on the strategic Strait of Hormuz, dominated maritime commerce throughout the Gulf. Hormuzi fleets facilitated trade between the Arabian Peninsula, the Indian subcontinent, and East Africa. Persian customs, language, and mercantile practices remained prominent in coastal Arabian settlements despite the Portuguese conquest of Hormuz in 1507. Throughout this period, Arab rulers maintained commercial and familial relations with Persian counterparts, often resulting in intermarriage and joint ventures, particularly in pearling and textile trade.

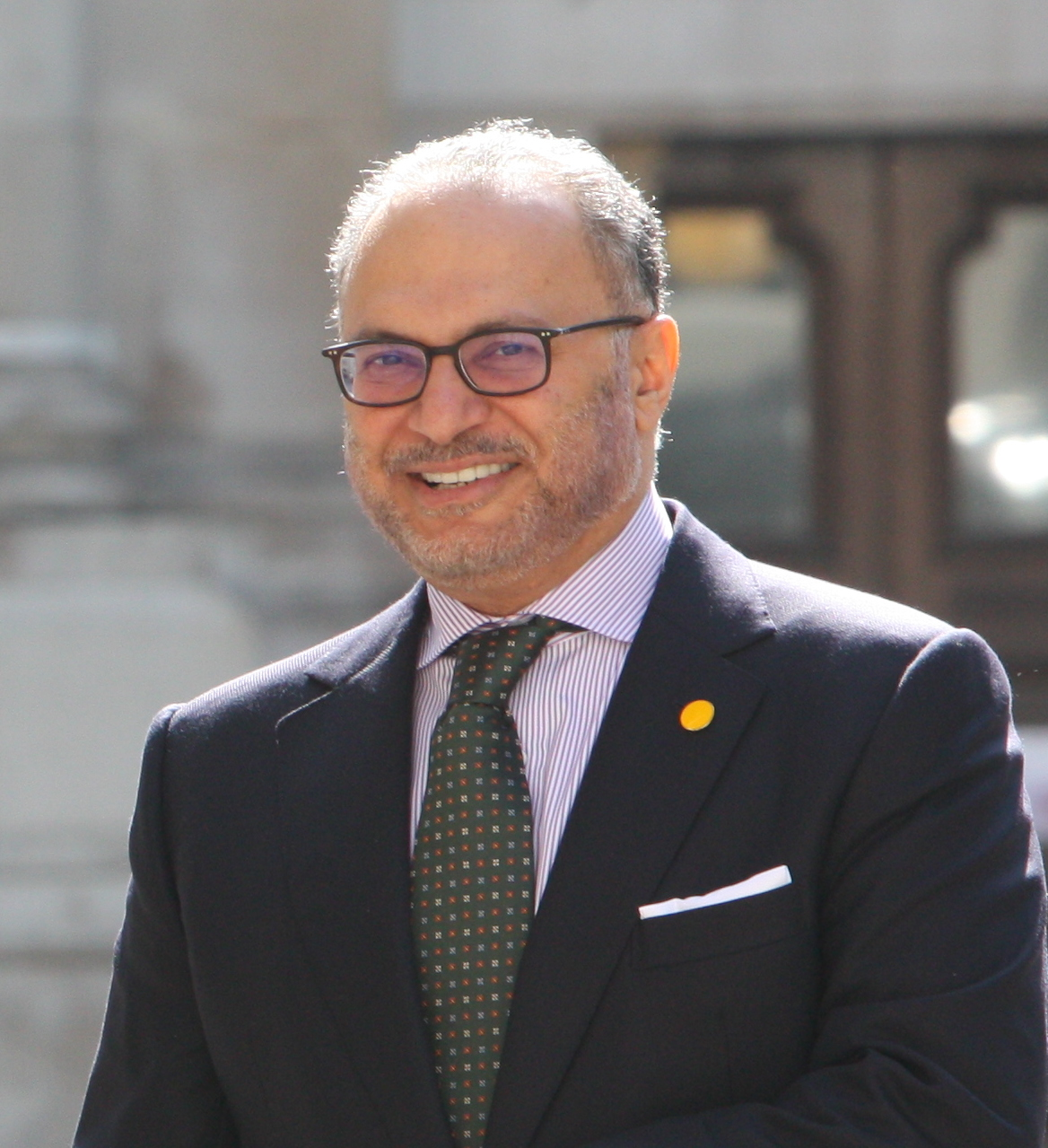
Anwar Gargash, ex-Minister of State for Foreign Affairs

By the 18th and 19th centuries, the migration of Persian-speaking merchants from southern Iran—especially from Bastak and the Laristan region—intensified. This migration was incentivized by tax exemptions, economic opportunities, and the relative stability offered by the Trucial States under British maritime protection. These migrants established Dubai's Al Bastakiya quarter, which they named after their hometown. Its architecture—characterized by narrow alleys, internal courtyards, and wind-tower (barjeel) ventilation systems—exemplifies the urban planning of southern Iran.

Alongside the Bastakis, other Persian-speaking groups from towns such as Evaz, Bander Lengeh, Gerash, Khonj, and Eshkanan settled in Dubai, Sharjah, and Ras al-Khaimah. These communities frequently retained surnames reflective of their origin (e.g., Al-Bastaki, Al-Awadhi, Al-Garashi, Al-Khanji).

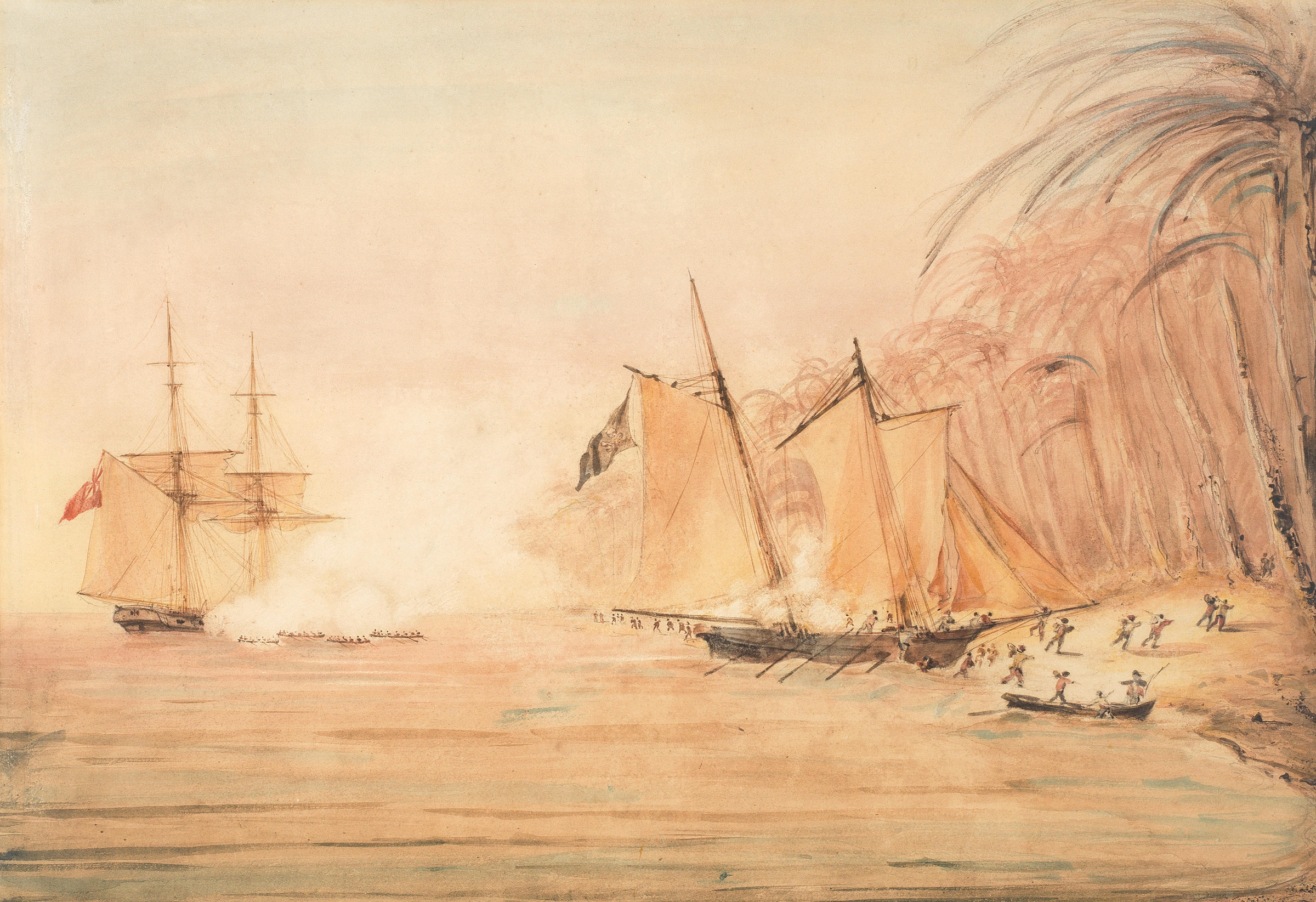
The Persian Gulf campaign of 1809

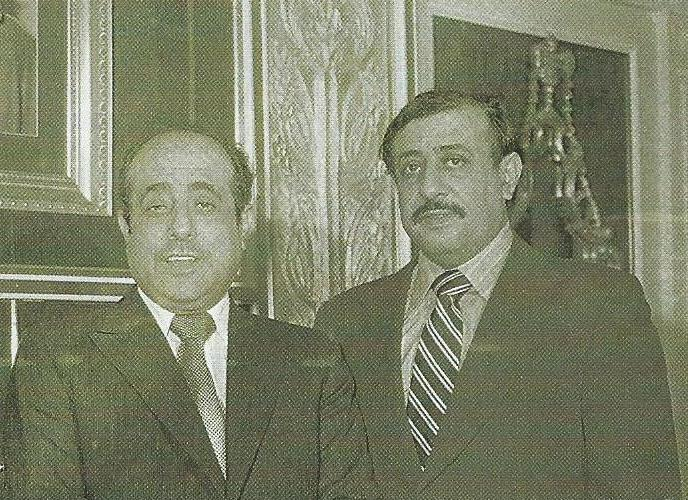
Abdul Rahim Galadari and Abdul Latif Galadari.

Emirati businessman Suhail Al-Zarooni

The Huwala are Sunni Arab tribes traditionally inhabiting the Iranian shores of the Persian Gulf, having moved there from the Arabian Peninsula during the 13th and 14th centuries. Among the most notable Huwala clans are the Qawasim, Marzoogis, Manasir, Al Ali, Matarish, Bani Hammad, Nusooris, Bani Tamim, and Galadaris. These tribes were primarily engaged in maritime commerce, pearl diving, and the charcoal and firewood trade, which they transported across the Gulf. Their distinct Arab Sunni identity set them apart from the majority Shia populations in southern Iran. The Huwala tribes played a vital role as intermediaries in the cultural and economic exchanges between Arab and Persian worlds.

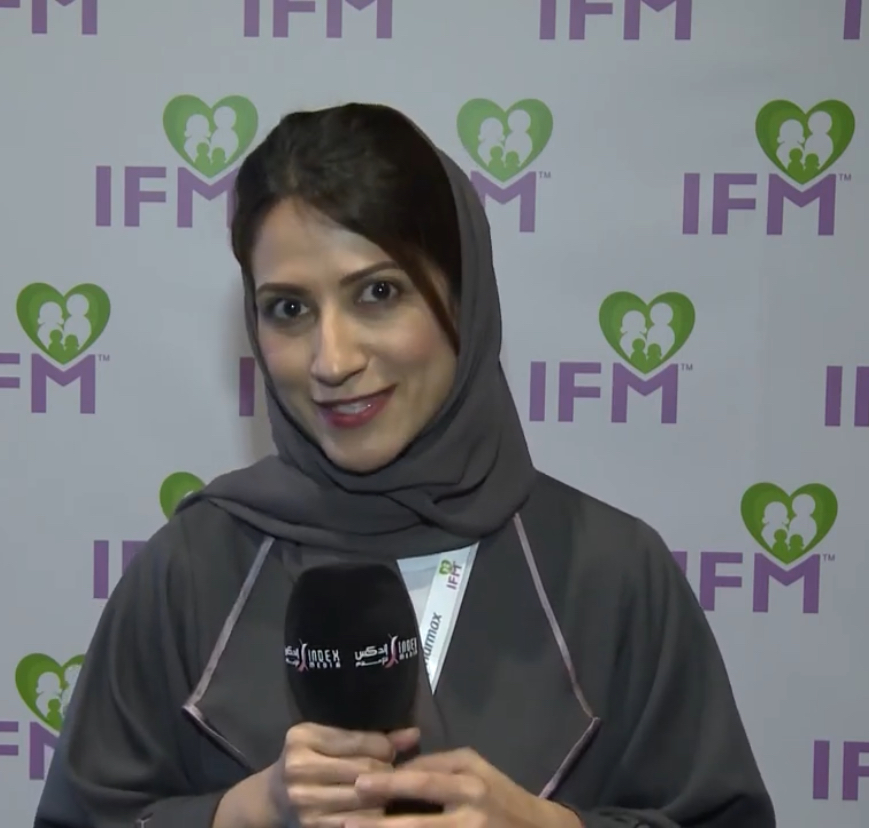
Dr. Ibtesam Al-Bastaki, director of the Dubai Health Authority

The ruling Qawasim of Ras al-Khaimah and Sharjah, which held territories on both sides of the Gulf until the early 19th century, facilitated this bidirectional movement. The Qawasim extended their influence to several coastal towns on the Persian mainland, including Bandar-e Lenga. They forged alliances with the Wahhabi movement in the late 18th century, adopting Wahhabi religious principles and participating in military actions. The British launched multiple campaigns to suppress the Qawasim, notably destroying their fleet at Lenga in 1809 and ending their piratical dominance by 1818-19. Despite these setbacks, the Qawasim retained some political presence into the late 19th century. By the late 19th century, Persian forces ended Qawasim rule in Lenga. In 1887, Persian troops captured the Shaikh of Lenga, installed military barracks, and brought the port under direct Persian administration. Although briefly challenged by local leaders in 1899, Persian control was reasserted.

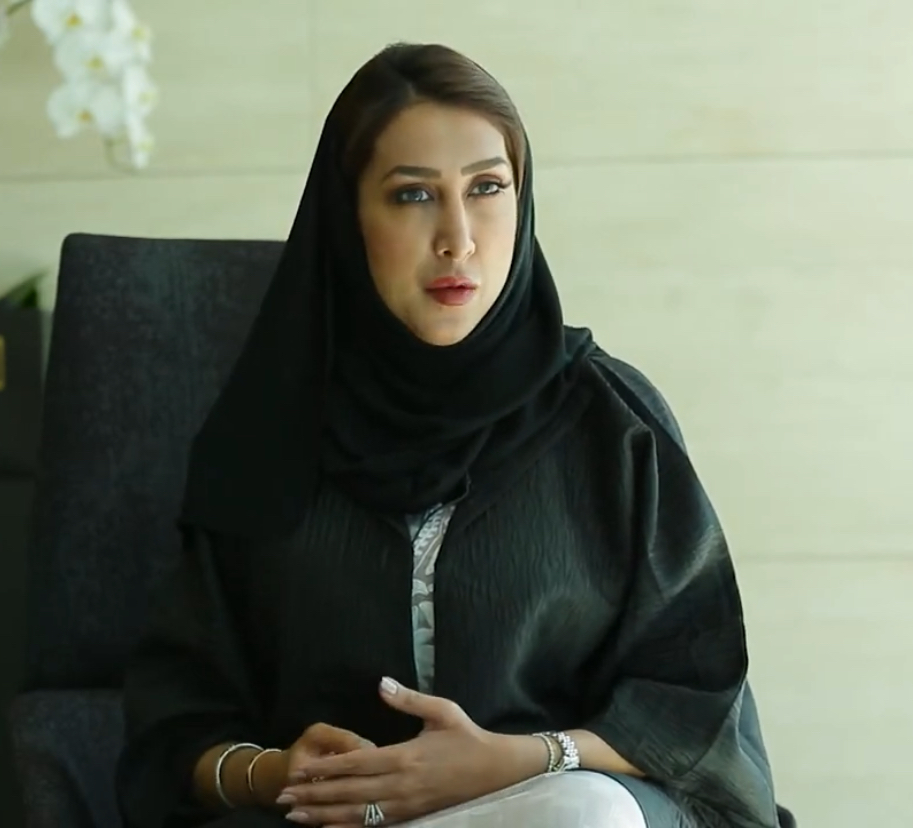
Khadja Al-Bastaki, Senior Vice President of Dubai Design Destrict.

The UAE's 1972 Citizenship Law formally recognized long-term Persian settlers. Article 17 granted Emirati nationality to Iranians residing in the Trucial States prior to 1925 or, alternatively, before the federation's formation in 1971. Consequently, numerous Persian-descended residents acquired citizenship and were integrated into national life as Ajam Emiratis. From the 1970s onward, Ajam families played a significant role in the UAE's post-oil economic expansion. Contributing to major sectors including media, hospitality, and finance.

Other prominent Ajam families include the Al-Farsi, Al-Zaruni, Al-Kandari, Al-Karji, and Al-Kokhardi lineages, as well as Gerashi and Lanjawi. These families were frequently engaged by local rulers as intermediaries, financiers, or political advisors.

== Language and religion ==
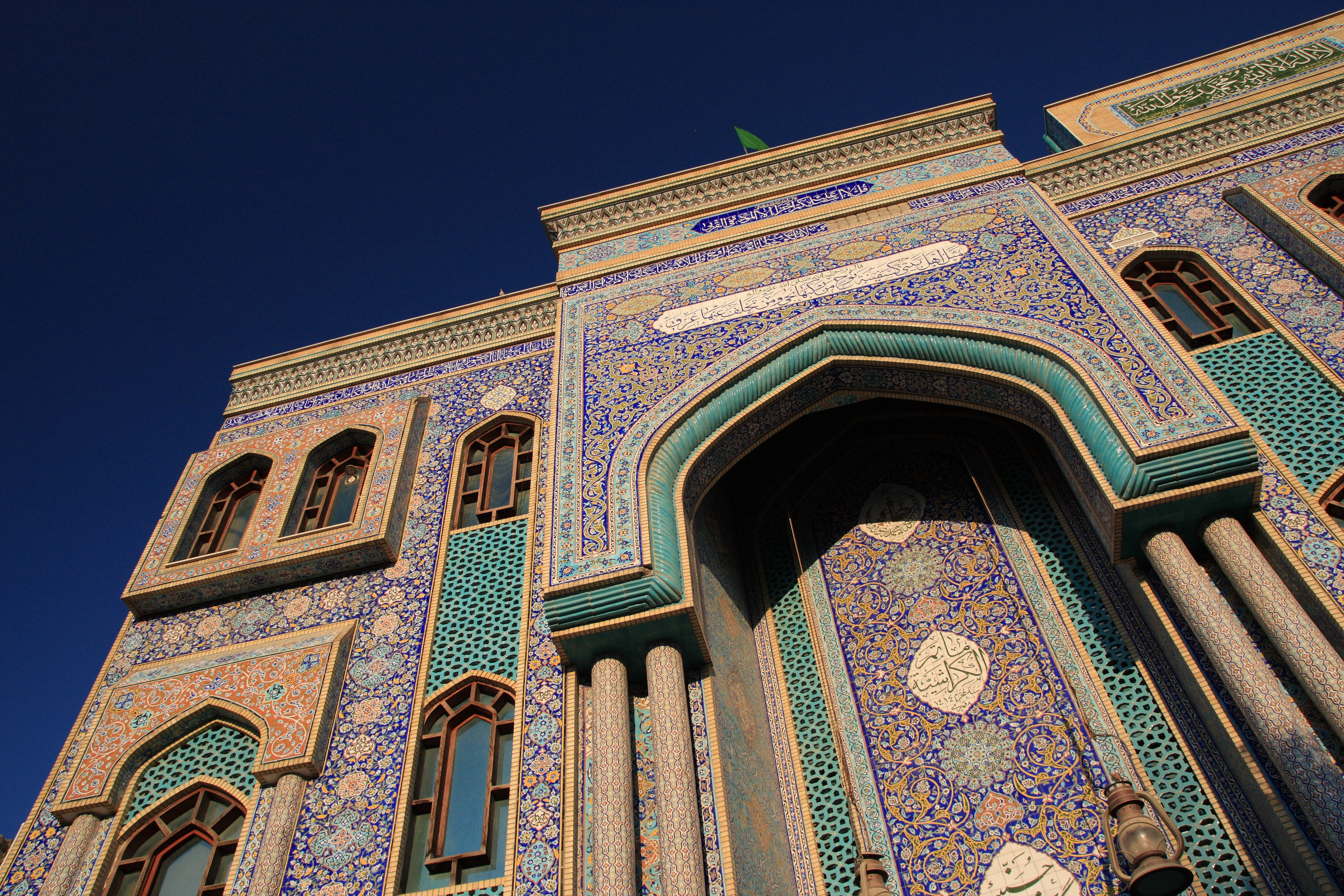
Iranian Shia Mosque, Dubai, UAE

The Ajam community in the UAE is linguistically and religiously heterogeneous. A significant portion are Twelver Shiʿa Muslims of Persian origin, historically linked to urban centers such as Bandar Abbas and Shiraz. Many of these communities constructed their own husayniyyat (Shiʿa congregation halls) in Dubai and other urban areas, maintaining Persian religious practices and language within ritual contexts.

Other Persian-speaking settlers, particularly from southern Fars Province, followed Sunni Islam and spoke variants of the Achomi dialects. These communities—collectively referred to as Khodmooni in local parlance—adhered to the Shafi‘i and Maliki schools of Sunni jurisprudence. These Sunni Ajam groups are particularly concentrated in Dubai, Sharjah, and in the northern Emirates like Ras al-Khaimah and Dibba. Surnames such as Al-Awadhi (Evaz), Al-Garashi (Gerash), and Al-Khanji (Khonj) remain common identifiers.

In Ras al-Khaimah and adjacent coastal zones, another subgroup—the Kumzari—resides in fishing communities and speaks the Kumzari language, an endangered Southwestern Iranian language. This group forms a distinct component of the broader Persian-descended population in the UAE.

While the Persian language and its dialects have been historically preserved within families and religious institutions, Arabic has become the dominant language in education and public discourse.

== Contemporary role and cultural contributions ==
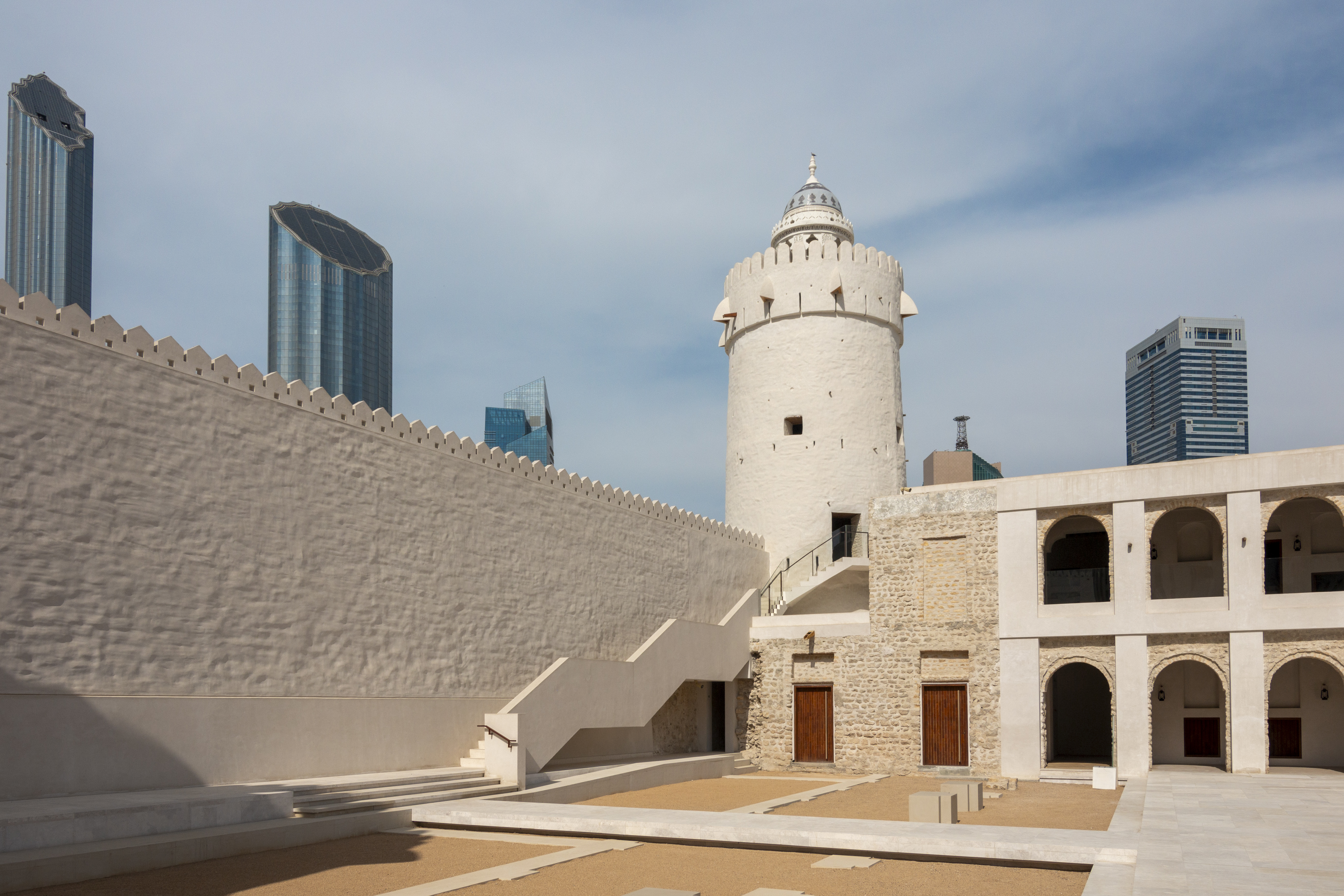
Qasr al-Hosn, Abu Dhabi, AE.

The Ajam community has left a significant imprint on Emirati culture. Persian culinary traditions have merged with local Emirati cuisine, evident in dishes featuring Persian spices, ingredients, and cooking techniques. Persian music, dance, and literature also hold influence in the UAE, contributing to the country's cultural diversity and artistic expressions. Emirati Arabic has absorbed a significant number of words from Persian and other Iranian languages. Persian influence is also evident in Emirati architecture, notably through features such as the Barjeel, a traditional windcatcher of Persian origin. Qasr al-Hosn, the oldest stone building in the UAE, was designed by Mohammed Al Bastaki in 1761. Al Bastakiya, a historical district in the city of Dubai, was built by Ajam Emirati merchants, many of Bastaki origin, a city in southern Iran.

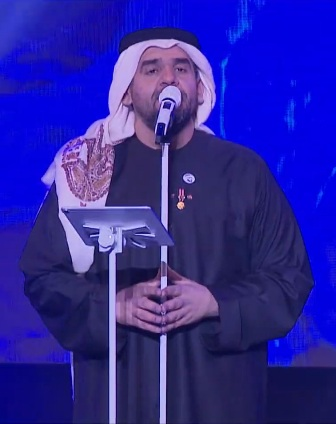
Hussain Al-Jassmi, 2020.

Some Ajam Emiratis have found themselves caught in the crossfire of the Iran-Arabia proxy conflict, facing challenges such as discrimination, political tensions, and economic uncertainty. The UAE's strategic alliance with Saudi Arabia, coupled with its efforts to maintain neutrality in regional conflicts, has created a complex environment for Ajam communities with connections to Iran. Instances of heightened security measures, surveillance, and political scrutiny targeting individuals perceived to have affiliations with Iran have been reported. Anti-Iranian sentiment has also been promoted due to disputes over Abu Musa and the Greater and Lesser Tunbs, the Persian Gulf naming dispute, and the Sunni-Shia divide. Many argue that the Emirati government ignore historical Ajam Emirati influence and identity in favor of promoting a more unified Arab Bedouin identity.

== Notable people ==
- Huda Al-Khatib: Emirati actress of Achomi ancestry.
- Ibtessam Al-Bastaki: Emirati doctor of Achomi ancestry.
- Khadija Al-Bastaki: Emirati businesswoman of Achomi ancestry.
- Ahlam: Emirati singer, of paternal Ahvazi and maternal Tehrani ancestry.
- Arvin Bastaki: Emirati singer of Achomi.
- Shahad Al-Bastaki: Emirati singer of Achomi ancestry.
- Moein Al-Bastaki: Emirati presenter of Achomi ancestry.
- Hussain Al-Jassmi: Emirati singer of Huwala ancestry.
- Mahdi Ali: Emirati footballer and coach.
- Anwar Gargash: Emirati politician.
- Ahmed Ali Al-Sayegh: Emirati politician.
- Mohammed Al-Gergawi: Emirati politician.
- Suhail Galadari: Emirati businessman of Huwala ancestry.
- Abdul Rahim Galadari: Emirati businessman of Huwala ancestry.
- Abdul Latif Galadari: Emirati businessman of Huwala ancestry.
- Amina Al-Rustamani: Emirati businesswoman.
- Muna Al-Gurg: Emirati businesswoman and philanthropist of Achomi ancestry.
- Easa Saleh Al-Gurg: Emirati businessman and diplomat of Achomi ancestry.
- Mahmood Al-Zarooni: Emirati horse-racing trainer.
- Ali Al-Lanjawi: Emirati jetski rider.
