= Emiratis =

People of the United Arab Emirates

الإمَارَاتِيُّون
- Flag of the United Arab Emirates

Total population
- 2,914,798

Regions with significant populations
- United Arab Emirates: approx. 2,700,000
- Canada: 36,578
- Kuwait: 28,593
- India: 19,941
- Oman: 18,978
- United States: 18,046
- Australia: 17,673
- United Kingdom: 17,161
- Turkey: 12,928
- Qatar: 10,034
- Saudi Arabia: 8,320
- Bahrain: 7,954
- France: 5,194
- Mali: 4,000
- Sweden: 3,292
- Libya: 3,130
- New Zealand: 2,976

Languages
- Arabic (Gulf, Emirati, Shihhi, Modern Standard, Bahrani, Hadhrami, Bedouin, Omani, Yafii, Dhofari) · Balochi · Achomi · English · Swahili · Luwati · Kumzari, · Mehri · Soqotri · Harsusi

Religion
- Sunni Islam (90%), Shia Islam (10%)

Related ethnic groups
- Afro-Emiratis, Ajam Emiratis, Baloch Emiratis, Emirati Americans, Iranian Arabs, Omanis, Other Arabs

Emiratis (Standard Arabic: الإماراتيون; Gulf Arabic: الإماراتيين) are the citizen population of the United Arab Emirates. Within the UAE itself, their number is approximately 1.15 million.

Formerly known as the Trucial States and then the Federation of Arab Emirates, the UAE is made up of seven emirates, each of which has a ruling family. Abu Dhabi was home to the Bani Yas tribal confederation and ruled by the Falahi house of Al Nahyan; Dubai was settled in 1833 by an offshoot of the Bani Yas, the Falasi house of Al Maktoum; Sharjah and Ras Al Khaimah are the home to the Huwali house of Al Qasimi, Ajman to the Na'imi house of Al Bu Kharaiban, Umm Al Quwain to the Al Ali house of Al Mualla and Fujairah to the Sharqi house of Hafaitat.

The Emiratis represent a diverse population with various ethnic, cultural, and tribal backgrounds. While united under the umbrella of Emirati citizenship, they encompass a range of ancestral origins, including Arabian, South Iranian and East African heritage. This diversity is rooted in historical interactions, migrations, conquest, and trade connections that have shaped the demographic landscape of the UAE. Emirati Arabic and English serve as the primary languages of communication amongst the Emirati populace. However, other languages such as Achomi, Balochi, and Swahili are also spoken among certain minority communities.

Islam, being the state religion of the UAE, plays a central role in Emirati society, serving as a guiding force in daily life, governance, and cultural expression. The construction of mosques, observance of religious rituals, and adherence to Islamic principles underscore the spiritual and moral foundations of Emirati identity. Emiratis are mostly Muslims, approximately 90% of whom are Sunni while the remaining 10% are Shia. Two Islamic schools of thought are mainly followed by the Sunni Emiratis, with the rulers of Abu Dhabi and Dubai traditionally adhering to the Maliki school of Islamic jurisprudence, while the rest of the rulers of the Emirates adhering to the Shafi'i school.

== History ==
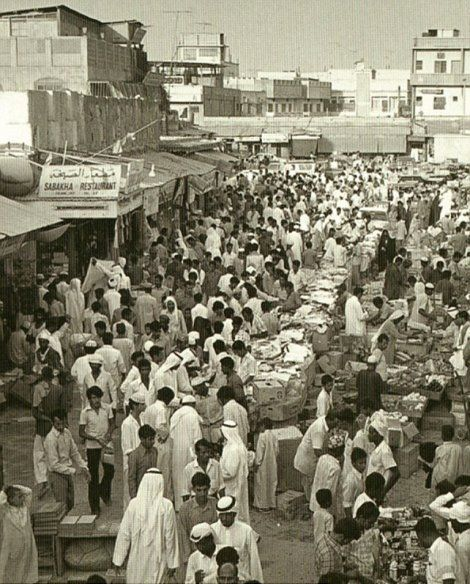
A souq in Deira, Dubai, 1950s.

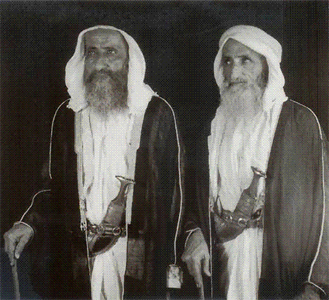
Sheikh Juma Al Maktoum (left) and Sheikh Saeed bin Maktoum Al Maktoum (right) of the Maktoum family

The ancient history of the UAE dates back centuries with archaeological sites, such as Jebel Faya, indicating human presence as far back as 125,000 years ago. Evidence of human settlement and civilization can be found at sites like Al-Ain and Jebel Hafeet, and the region's importance as a trading hub along maritime routes connecting Mesopotamia, the Indus Valley, Meluhha, Elam, and Ancient Egypt, as evidenced by artifacts such as pottery, seals, and coins discovered at archaeological sites like Tell Abraq, Umm Al-Nar, and Ed-Dur, showcasing the early civilizations that flourished in the area, including the Magan and Dilmun civilizations, as well as the later influence of the Sumerians, Akkadians, Persians, and Greeks, all of which contributed to the cultural, ethnic, and historical development of the region.

The United Arab Emirates is a Union of seven emirates whose history are entwined with various empires, such as those of the Islamic Caliphates, Oman, Portugal, Iran, and the United Kingdom. Envoys from the Islamic prophet Muhammad saw the tribes of the area convert to Islam around 630 C.E., followed by a short period of apostasy which culminated in the Battle of Dibba.

Later in the 16th century, the Portuguese would battle the then-dominant force in the Persian Gulf, the Safavid dynasty, for control of the region. During the 17th century, the Ottomans took control of the islands and UAE was known as the "Pirate Coast." By the 19th century, the British Empire had taken complete control of the land then called the Trucial States. Oil was discovered in 1959. The Trucial States were under the control of the British Empire until 1971. Consequently, with weakening British control, the Trucial States became the UAE in 1971 with Ras al-Khaimah joining in 1972.

The term Emirati comes from the plural of the Arabic word emiratesate (Arabic: إمارة), with adding the suffix -i. Each emirate is ruled by a Sheikh. The Bani Yas tribe forms the basis of many clans within the UAE. Sub-clans of the Bani Yas include

- Al Bu Falah (Abu Dhabi)
- Al Bu Falasah (Dubai)

The term "Emirati" also refers to Arabs with origins in the UAE. Many modern Emirati names are derived from these tribal names or offshoots of these tribes, for instance, Mazroui (from Mazari), Nuaimi (from Naim), and Al Sharqi (from Sharqiyin).

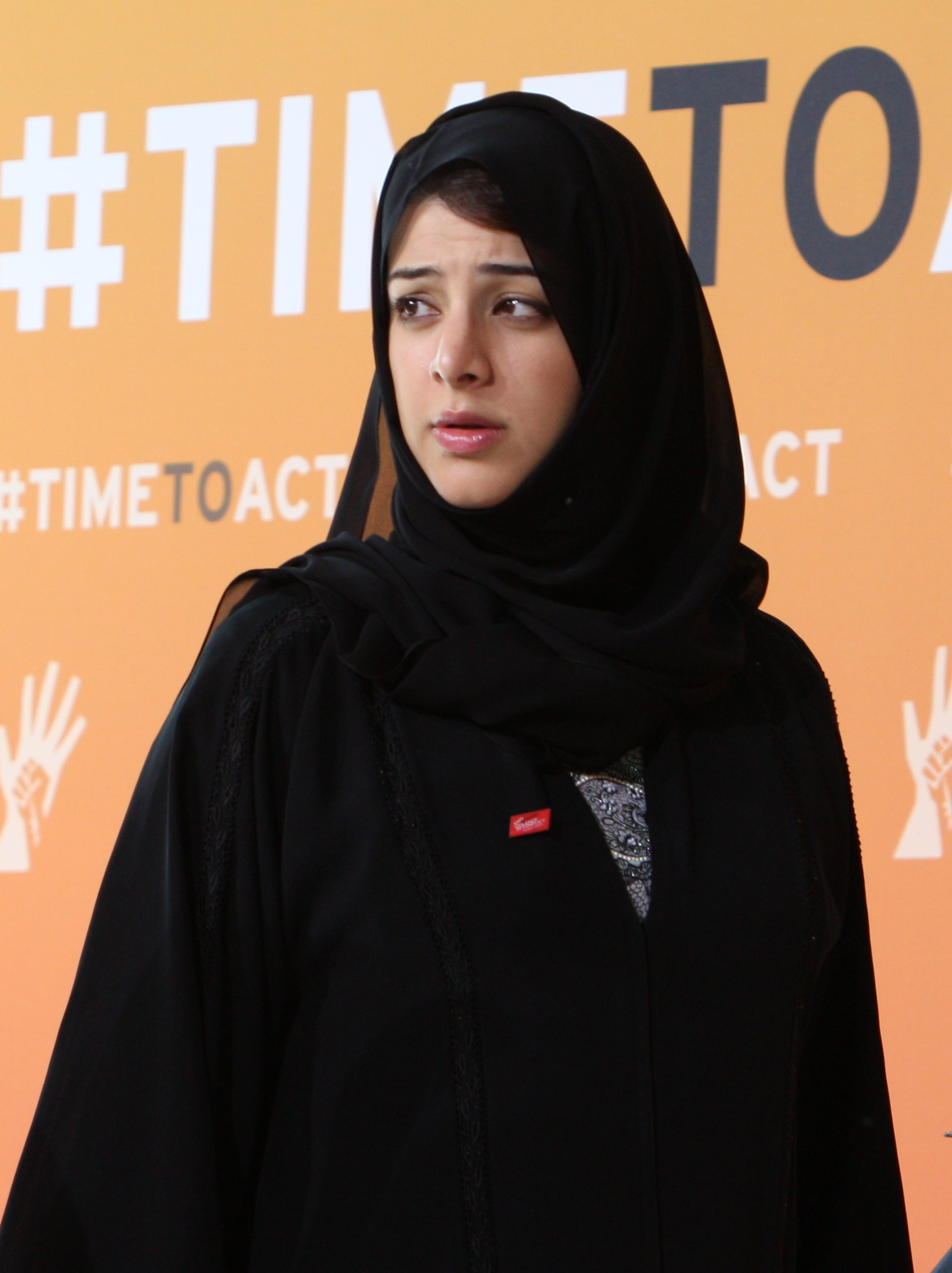
Reem Al Hashimi, Minister of State and Managing Director for the Dubai Expo 2020 Bid.

== Lexicology ==
The word Emirati is a word derived from the Arabic name of the UAE "Al-Emarat," and the Arabic suffix -i which denotes belonging. The demonym Emirian has a similar root from except with the suffix -ian being added to emir. Rarer Emirian demonyms and adjectives include Emiri and Emiratian, both of which are unofficial and informal alternatives. However, due to strong tribal allegiances, many Emiratis also self-identified by their tribal affiliations. Historically, Emiratis were called Trucial Coasters or Trucials. Emiratis in ancient history were called Maganites.

== National symbols ==
Falcon training is one of the UAE's national symbols. These birds can be seen on the emblem of the United Arab Emirates. They were traditionally used for hunting, and trained by the Bedouin tribes. Most Emiratis view Sheikh Zayed bin Sultan Al Nahyan as an essential component of Emirati nationalism, Emiratis are commonly referred to as "Eyal Zayed," meaning sons of Zayed. Emiratis are proud of their nation's global name associated with tourist prospects, prefer interactions with fellow nationals, most are computer literate and adult Emiratis born in the 21st century are more likely to be bilingual There are many landmarks and sculptures in the country of teapots, water jugs and coffeemakers to symbolize the hospitality of the Emirati people. Due to the pearl-diving history of the Emirates, nautical sailing and other activities at sea are sometimes emphasized. Due to its prominence throughout Emirati history in cultivation, date fruits play an important role in Emirati life. Another national symbol is the Arabic coffee pot with the elongated thin spout called a Dallah; a sign of Emirati generosity.The national symbols of the UAE encapsulate the country's rich cultural heritage, natural beauty, and values of unity, resilience, and pride. These symbols are celebrated and revered by the Emirati people and play a vital role in the nation's identity.

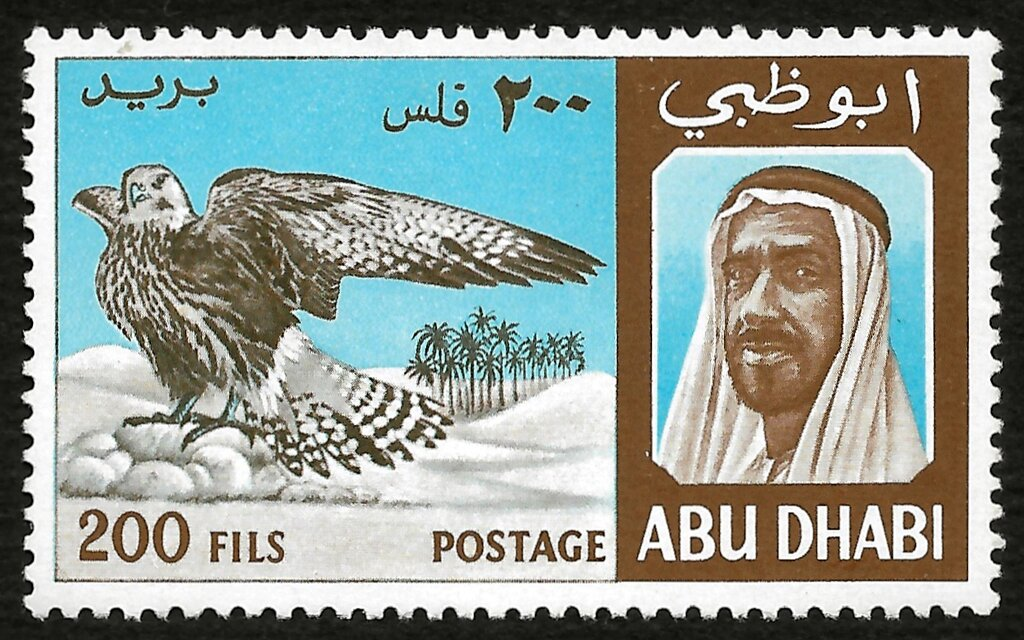
The Falcon is the national bird of the UAE. A symbol of pride.

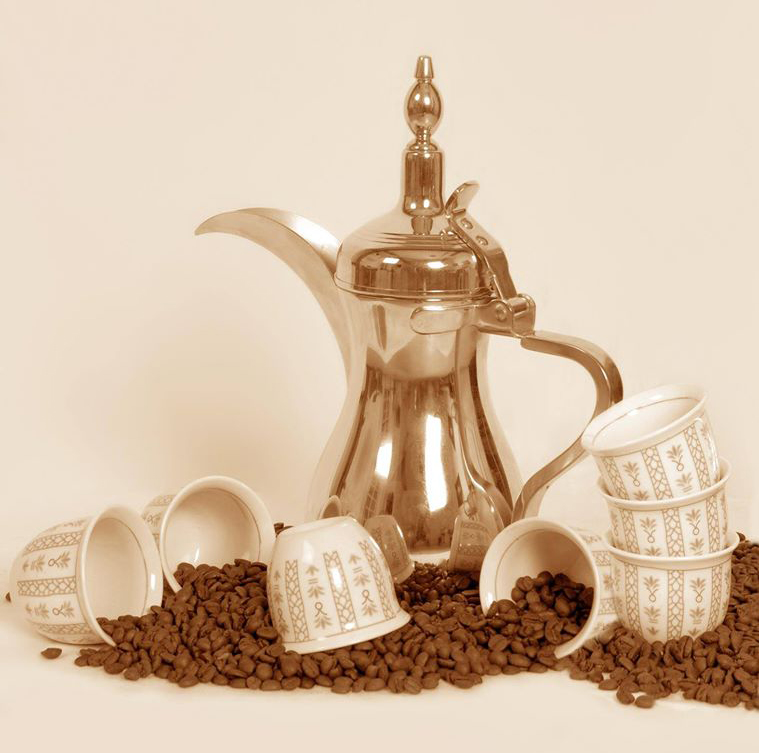
A dallah is a traditional Arabic coffee pot for serving Arabian coffee. It is a symbol of the Emirati culture, featuring on the United Arab Emirates dirham coin.

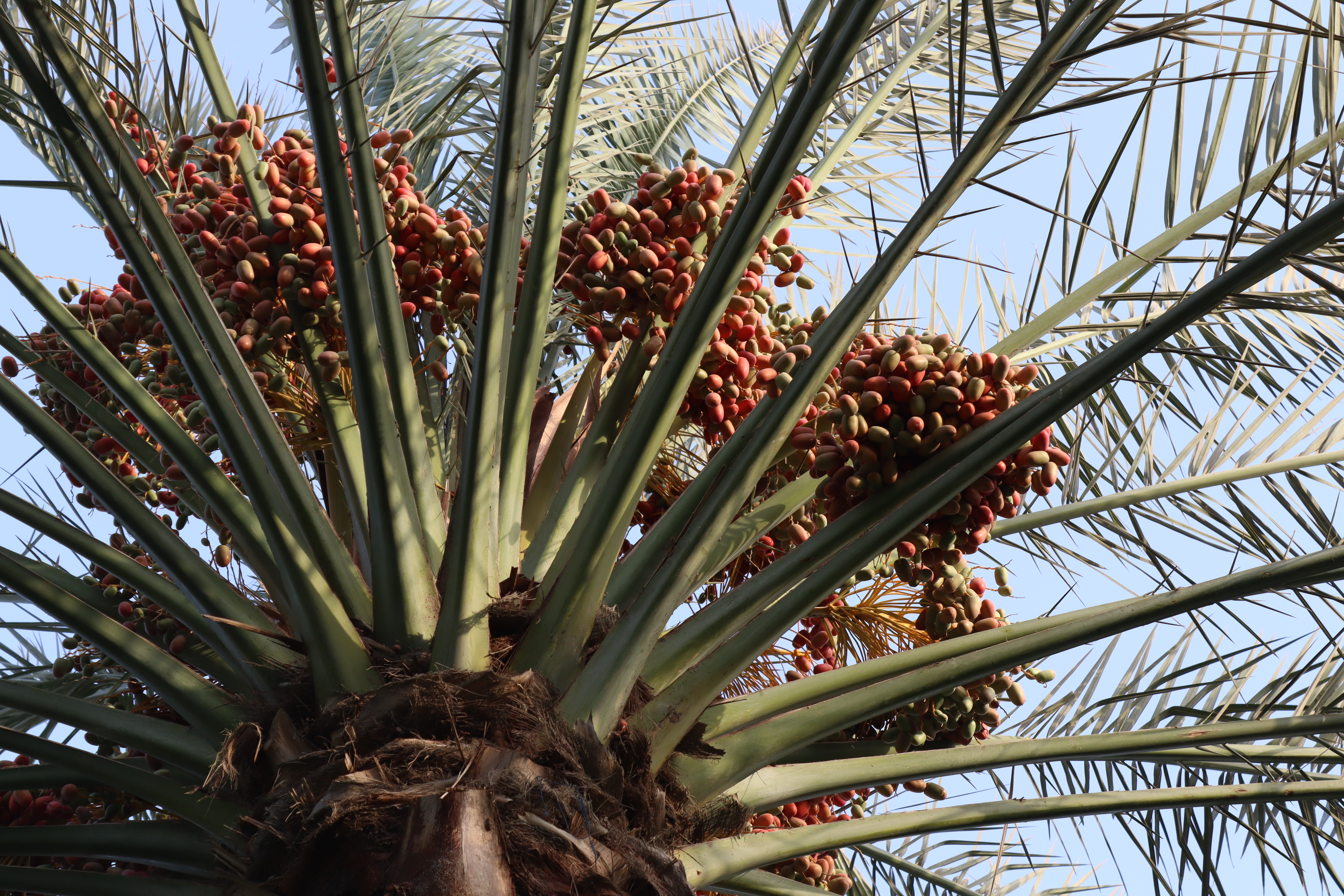
The 'Nakhla' date palm, a symbol of prosperity.

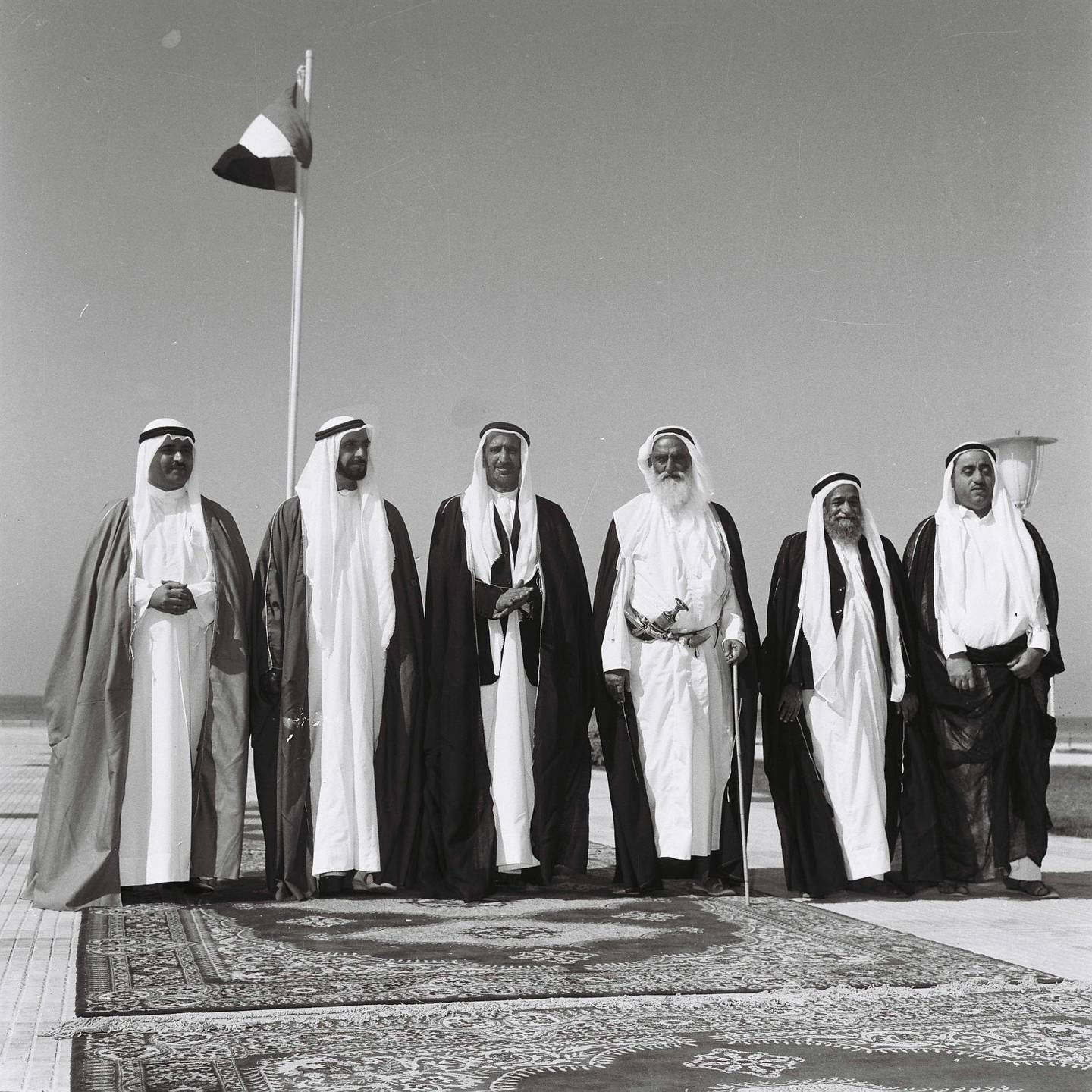
The 6 founding fathers of the UAE.

== Demographics ==
The population of the UAE as of 2019 was 9.7 million with a minority being Emiratis. However, this figure is constantly changing due to migration and other factors. UAE nationals make up 1 million.

As of 2022 the total fertility rate (TFR) of the Emirati population stood at 3.1, significantly higher than the national average of 1.46 in the same year, though reflecting a 16% decline from 3.7 in 2015.

Statistics for UAE nationals in 2018 as it follows:

Emirate		Male	Female	Total	Source
Flag of Emirate of Abu Dhabi	Abu Dhabi	204,108	200,438	404,546	
Flag of Emirate of Dubai	Ajman	21,600	20,586	42,186	
Flag of Emirate of Dubai	Dubai	127,641	126,959	254,600	
Flag of Emirate of Fujairah	Fujairah	32,486	32,374	64,860	
Flag of Emirate of Ras Al Khaimah	Ras Al Khaimah	49,181	48,348	97,529	
Flag of Emirate of Sharjah	Sharjah	78,818	74,547	153,365	
Umm al-Qaiwain	Umm Al Quwain	8,671	8,811	17,482	
Flag of the United Arab Emirates	United Arab Emirates	522,505	512,063	1,034,568	

Non-Emiratis form the vast majority of the UAE (88.52%) and are composed of expatriates, with the largest groups hailing from South Asian countries such as India (2.62 million), Pakistan (1.21 million) and Bangladesh (706,000). There are also nationals of other GCC and Arab countries who live in the UAE. Members of other Asian communities, including Iran (454,000), the Philippines (530,000).

== Bedouin Emiratis ==
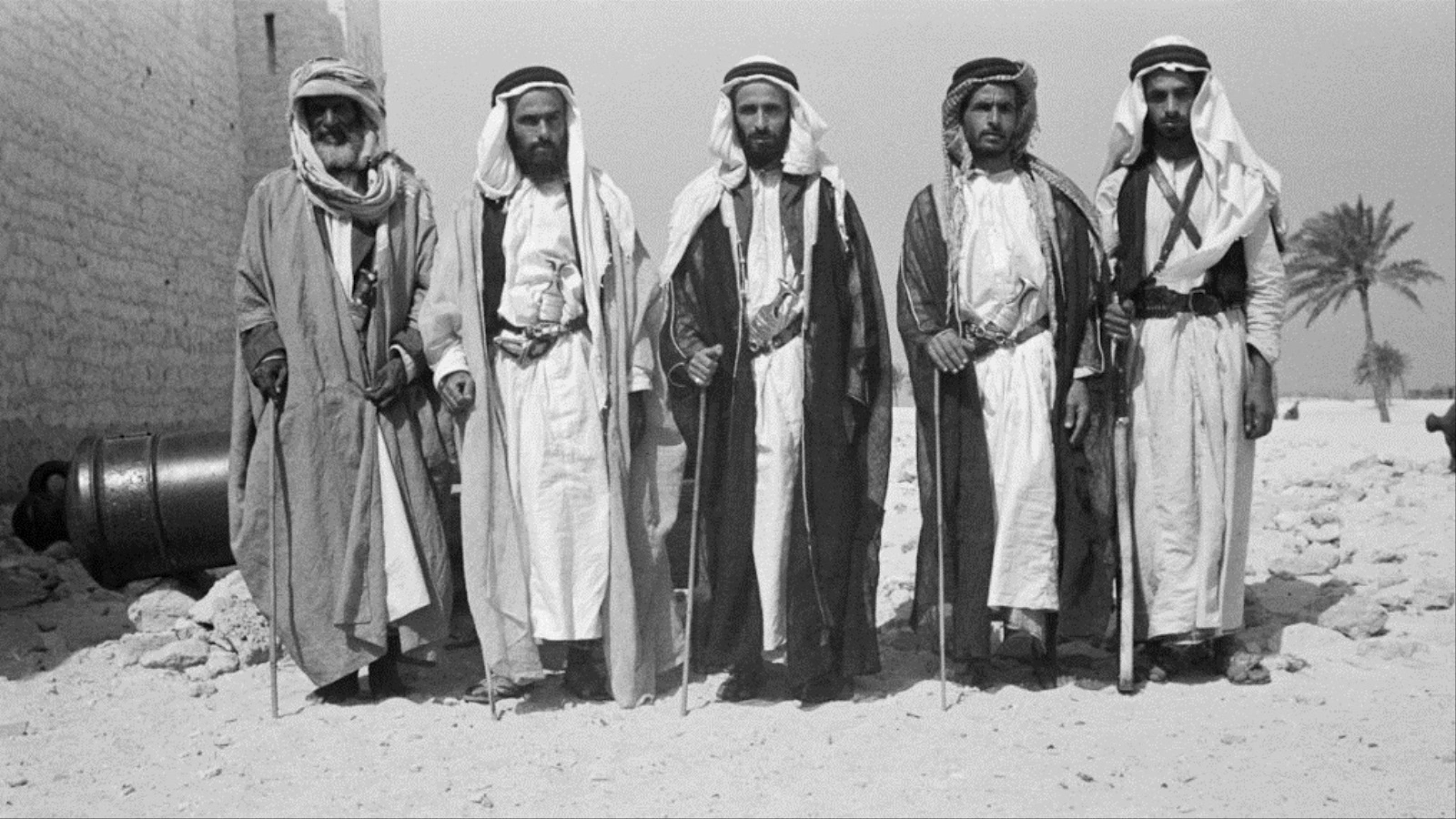
Members of the House of Nahyan during the Buraimi dispute (1950s).

Bedouin Emiratis, also known as Bedu Emiratis or Bedouin Arab Emiratis, are Emiratis of Bedouin Arab descent. They have historically lived nomadically in the desert, adapting to harsh conditions by moving with their families and animals in search of water and grazing areas. This nomadic lifestyle has fostered a strong sense of community and kinship among Bedouin tribes, with social structures traditionally organized around extended family networks and tribal affiliations. Among the prominent Bedouin tribes of the United Arab Emirates are the Manasir, Awamir, Al Murrah, Afar, Rashid, Al Bu Shamis, Khawatir, Ghafalah, and Bani Qitab, each of whose migrations extended between the Emirates region and various parts of southern and eastern Arabia such as the Empty quarter.

Bedouin culture emphasizes preserving traditions through oral history, storytelling, and rituals, including distinctive clothing and music. Emirati traditions of Bedouin origin include: Yowlah, Falconry, Nabati Poetry, Razfa, Al Sadu, Emirati coffee culture, and the national clothing of the UAE.

== Hadar Emiratis ==
Hadar Emiratis, also known as Hadarī Emiratis or settled Emiratis, are Emiratis whose ancestors traditionally lived in permanent towns, villages, and oasis settlements. The term Hadar (Arabic: الحضر) is generally contrasted with Badu (بدو), referring to nomadic and semi-nomadic communities. Hadar communities historically concentrated along the coast and in oases, with livelihoods based on pearling, fishing, maritime trade, commerce, and agriculture.

Hadar society was organized around extended families and tribal affiliations, and Hadar and Bedouin identities were not mutually exclusive. Among tribes historically associated with settled communities were the Qawasim, Maraziq, Naqbiyin, Abadilah, Al Ali, Rumaithat, among others. Major Hadar settlements included Abu Dhabi, Dubai, Sharjah, Ajman, Umm Al Quwain, Ras Al Khaimah, and the oasis communities of Al Ain and Liwa.

Hadar culture contributed to Emirati traditions in areas including architecture, pearling, fishing, commerce, crafts, music, clothing, and cuisine. Modernization and urbanization during the twentieth century reduced the distinction between Hadar and Badu, and the term is now primarily used in historical, cultural, and genealogical contexts.

== Ajam Emiratis ==
Mahdi Ali, former coach of the UAE national team.

Ajam Emiratis, also known as Ayam Emiratis, Persian Emiratis or Iranian Emiratis, are Emiratis of Achomi and Iranian descent. Majority of Ajam Emiratis trace their ancestral roots to Southern Iran, particularly the provinces of Fars, Hormozgan, Bushehr and Baluchestan. The migration of Persians to Eastern Arabia, including the UAE, has occurred over centuries as historically, Persians have played a significant role in the cultural and economic development of what is now the UAE. The region, known as Magan and the province of Mazun in ancient times, was subject to various Persian empires, including the Achaemenid, Parthian, and Sassanian dynasties and a significant trading partner of the ancient Elam. Persian influence extended beyond political control to include trade, commerce, and cultural exchange. Moreover, the historical presence of the Kingdom of Hormuz, an influential Persian Gulf trading kingdom which controlled both sides of the gulf, further strengthened ties between Persians and Eastern Arabians.

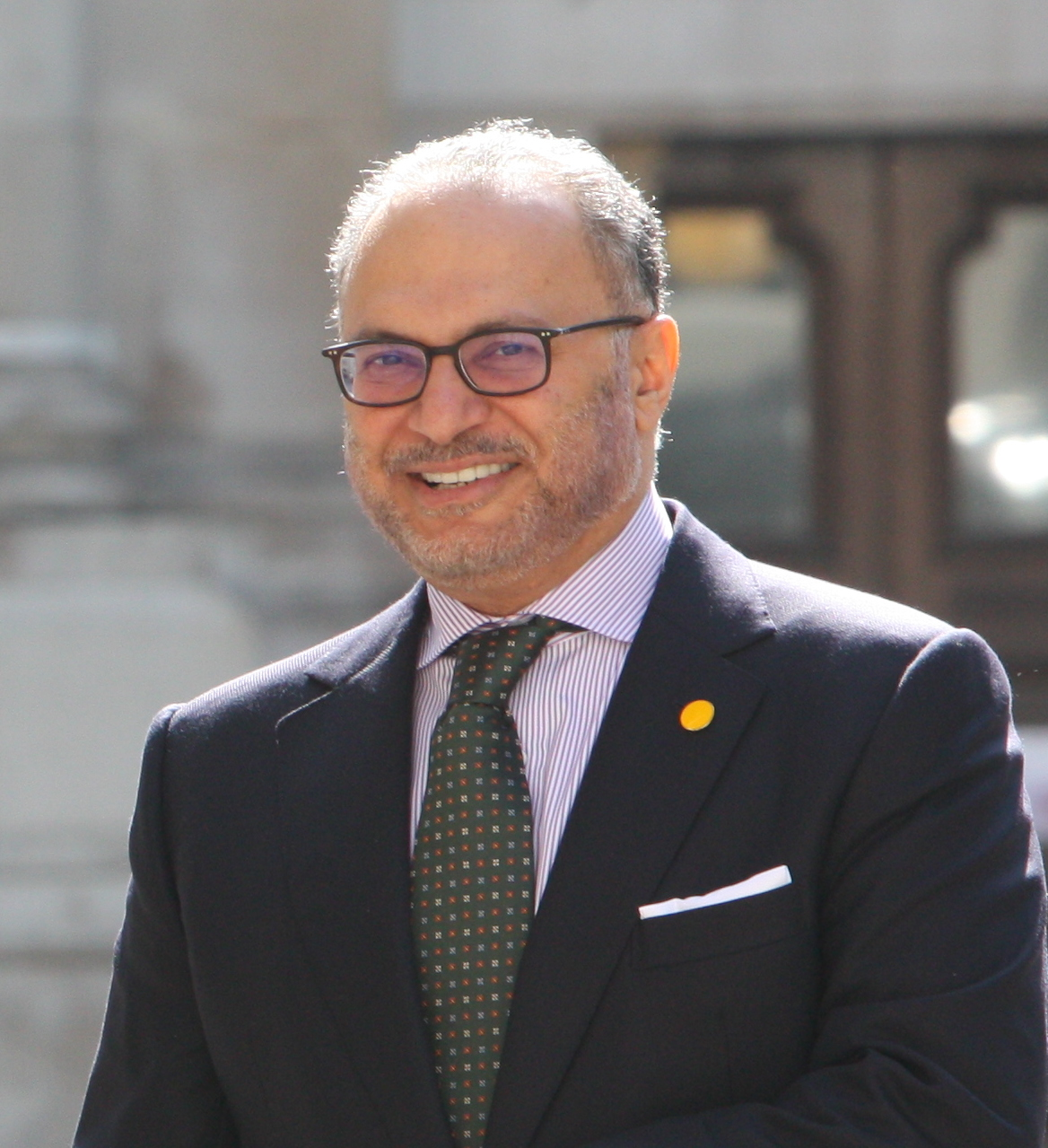
Anwar Gargash, the senior diplomatic advisor to the President of the United Arab Emirates.

During the 18th and 19th centuries, substantial migration from southern Iran to the UAE transpired due to burgeoning trade networks and maritime commerce. This migration led to a significant settlement of Persians in coastal cities such as Dubai, Sharjah, Ras Al Khaimah and Ajman, contributing to the region's cultural diversity and commercial growth. The Qassimi rulers, who governed territories in both southern Iran and the Emirates during this period, facilitated trade and migration between the two regions, thereby bolstering connections between Ajam communities in Iran and the UAE. In 1972, Article 17 of the newly promulgated Citizenship and Passport Law offered Emirati citizenship to Iranians who were living in the British-protected Trucial States prior to 1925 or before the UAE's independence in 1971.

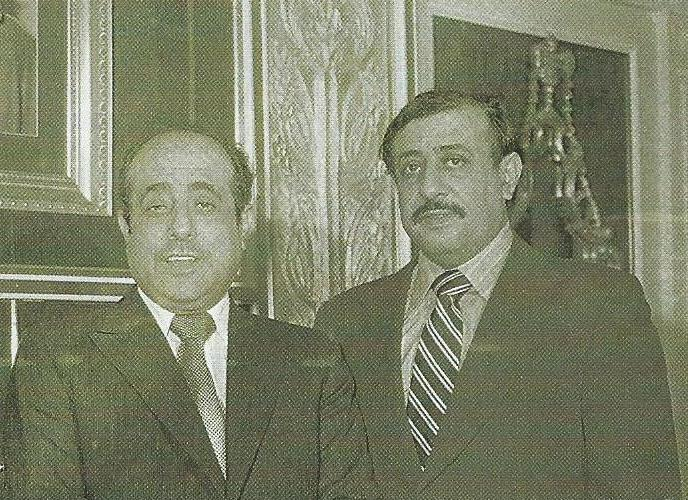
House of Galadari, a Huwala-Emirati family who contributed significantly to the rise of Dubai.

Ajam Emiratis comprise the majority of the Shia Emirati population, with the remaining Shia Emiratis predominantly being Baharna Emiratis and Khoja Emiratis. Among the Sunni Ajam Emiratis, a notable portion trace their ancestry to the Achomi people, an ethnic subgroup within the broader Persian community. The Achomi primarily reside in southern Iran and their native language is Achomi. Many Ajam Emiratis, particularly those in Ras Al Khaimah and Dibba, are of Kumzari ancestry and also communicate in Kumzari. Additionally, many Ajam are of Afro-Iranian and Huwala origin. Ajam Emiratis constitute the majority of the Bedoon population, many whom reportedly hold Comoran passports due to a deal between the governments of the UAE and Comoros.

The Ajam community has left a significant imprint on Emirati culture. Persian culinary traditions have merged with local Emirati cuisine, evident in dishes featuring Persian spices, ingredients, and cooking techniques. Persian music, dance, and literature also hold influence in the UAE, contributing to the country's cultural diversity and artistic expressions. Emirati Arabic has absorbed a significant number of words from Persian and other Iranian languages. Persian influence is also evident in Emirati architecture, notably through features such as the Barjeel, a traditional windcatcher of Persian origin. Qasr al-Hosn, the oldest stone building in the UAE, was designed by Mohammed Al Bastaki in 1761. Al Bastakiya, a historical district in the city of Dubai, was built by Huwali Emirati merchants, many of Bastaki origin, a city in southern Iran.

Some Ajam Emiratis have found themselves caught in the crossfire of the Iran-Arabia proxy conflict, facing challenges such as discrimination, political tensions, and economic uncertainty. The UAE's strategic alliance with Saudi Arabia, coupled with its efforts to maintain neutrality in regional conflicts, has created a complex environment for Ajam communities with connections to Iran. Instances of heightened security measures, surveillance, and political scrutiny targeting individuals perceived to have affiliations with Iran have been reported. Anti-Iranian sentiment has also been promoted due to disputes over Abu Musa and the Greater and Lesser Tunbs, the Persian Gulf naming dispute, and the Sunni-Shia divide. Many argue that the Emirati government ignore historical Ajam Emirati influence and identity in favor of promoting a more unified Arab Bedouin identity.

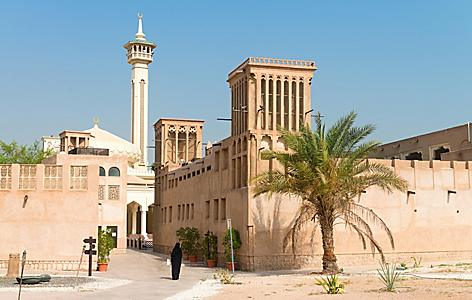
Al Bastakiya, Dubai

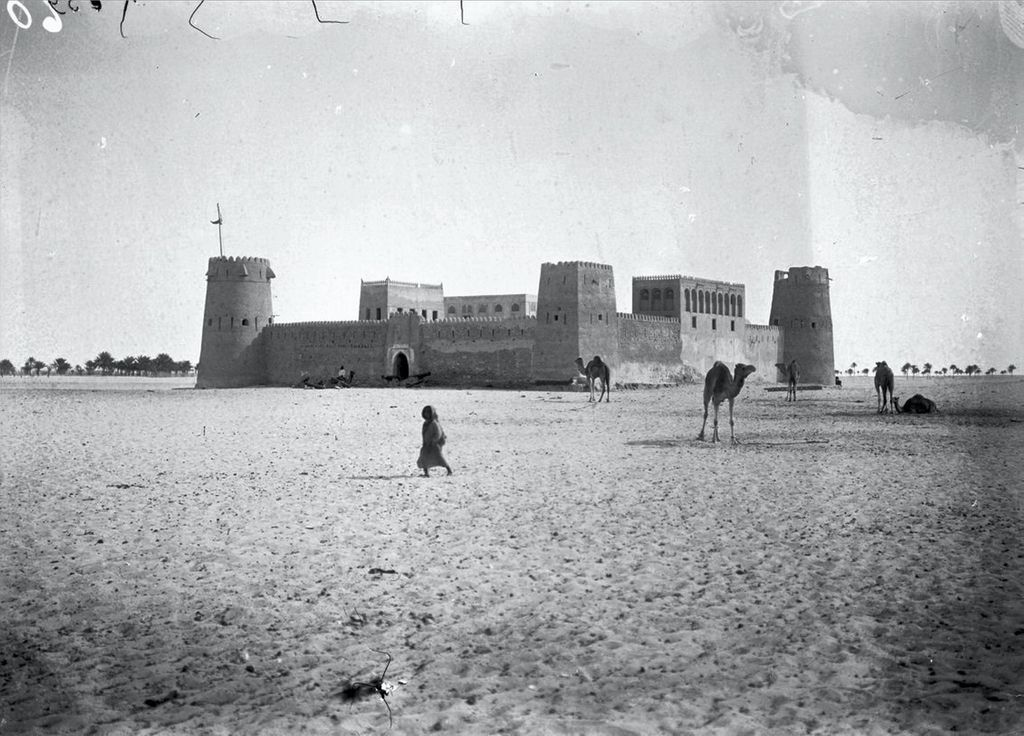
Qasr Al Hosn, Abu Dhabi

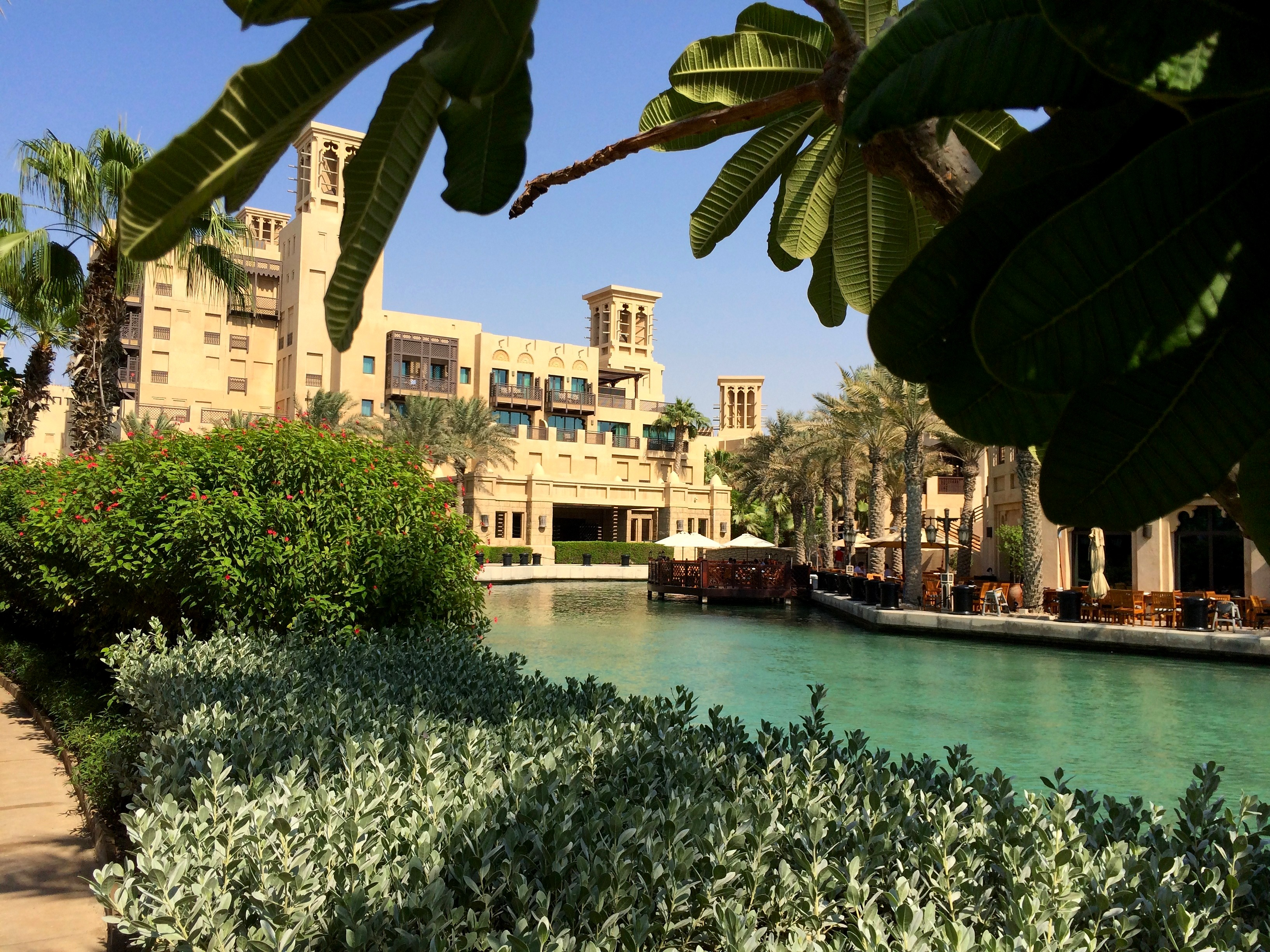
Burjeels in Madinat Jumeirah, Dubai.

Bandar Lengeh, Iran. Much of southern Iran was under Qassimi rule in the 18th and 19th centuries.

== Afro-Emiratis ==
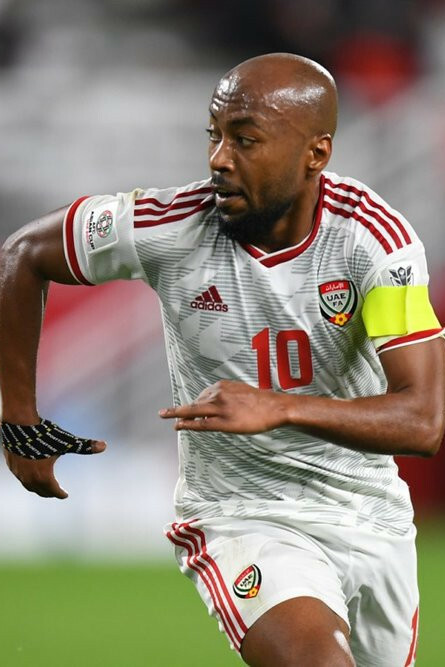
Ismail Matar, an Emirati football player, often recognized as one of the greatest in Emirati football.

Afro-Emiratis, also known as Black Emiratis, are Emiratis of Black African and Afro-Arab descent. They are mostly concentrated in the Northern Emirates. Despite their minority status within the broader Emirati population, they have a significant historical presence and cultural contribution, especially in sports and music. Afro-Emirati traditions include Liwa, Fann at-Tanbura, Bandari, and Nuban. The history of Afro-Emiratis dates back centuries, with evidence of trade and cultural interactions between the Arabian Peninsula and Africa existing since antiquity. Afro-Emiratis are culturally close to other African diaspora in the Persian Gulf and Arabian Peninsula, such as Afro-Omanis, Afro-Saudis, and Afro-Iranians.

Most Afro-Emiratis are descendants of Zanzibari, East African, and Southern African slaves. The UAE's involvement in the Indian Ocean slave trade and proximity to the Omani Empire shaped the presence of individuals of African descent in the region.

Afro-Emiratis, like other Emiratis, identify with the national identity of the UAE and the wider Eastern Arabian and Arab identity. Slaves were considered as members of the tribes and the families to which they were enslaved. After the abolishment of slavery, freed slaves were given the option to adopt the surname of the tribes they served, many former slaves were granted Emirati citizenship in 1971.

Despite enjoying full legal rights as Emirati citizens, many Afro-Emiratis face social stigma, issues of racial identity and acceptance remains complex within the UAE, efforts to promote inclusivity are ongoing, but challenges persist, particularly in areas of intermarriage and societal perceptions of an 'Emirati' identity. However, African servants have historically been considered part of the Emirati family.

== Languages ==
Arabic is the official language of the UAE. Emiratis predominantly communicate in Emirati Arabic (Arabic: اللهجة الإماراتية, romanized: al-Lahjah al-Imārātīyah), a variant of Gulf Arabic that serves as the national language in the UAE, though the official status is granted to Modern Standard Arabic which is used in politics, literature, news, and diplomacy. Emirati Arabic distinguishes itself through its unique vocabulary, pronunciation, and grammatical structures, setting it apart from other Arabic dialects prevalent in the region. Emirati Arabic dialects are believed to have evolved from the linguistic variations spoken by ancient pre-Islamic Arabian tribes in Eastern Arabia, particularly the Azd, Qays, and Tamim, as noted by Emirati linguist and historian, Ahmed Obaid.

Additionally, Emirati Arabic incorporates grammatical properties from smaller varieties within the UAE, generally of tribal nature, leading to variations identifiable across different geographical regions. Emirati Arabic encompasses several dialectal variations, each with its own characteristics and influences. These variations can be broadly categorized into sub-varieties based on geographical distribution:

1. Northern Emirates Dialects: Spoken in Dubai, Sharjah, Ajman, Umm al-Quwain, and the western part of Ras al-Khaimah.
2. Eastern Emirates Dialects: Found mainly in Fujairah, Dibba, Khor Fakkan, Hatta, Kalba, Masfout, and the eastern part of Ras al-Khaimah.
3. Abu Dhabi Dialects: Spoken in Abu Dhabi, including the oasis city of Al Ain, with linguistic influences extending into the Omani region of Al-Buraimi.

Furthermore, Emirati Arabic dialects can also be distinguished based on environmental factors, including variations associated with Bedouin communities, coastal, agricultural, and mountainous regions.

In addition to Emirati Arabic, various other Arabic dialects are spoken within the Emirati populace. Notably, Shihhi Arabic, prevalent in the eastern region of the UAE, particularly in the emirates of Ras al Khaimah and Fujairah.

Emirati Arabic, while predominant, exists alongside several minority languages spoken by specific communities within the UAE, including:

1. Swahili: a Bantu language primarily spoken by Afro-Emirati communities, Swahili reflects historical ties between the East African coast and the Arabian Peninsula. It is prevalent among communities with ancestry tracing back to coastal regions such as Zanzibar and Kenya.
2. Kumzari: a Southwestern Iranian language primarily spoken by the Shihuh and Kumzars, indigenous communities in the Musandam Peninsula and parts of the northern UAE.
3. Balochi: a Northwestern Iranian language primarily spoken by Balochis and Ajam Emiratis with historical and cultural ties to the Balochistan region spanning Iran, Pakistan, and Afghanistan.
4. Achomi: a Persian and Southwestern Iranian language primarily spoken by Ajam Emiratis, who have Persian ancestry, Achomi is a widely spoken minority language.

Arabic is used in government, legal matters, and traditional cultural practices. It is also the language of instruction in many schools. Despite the prevalence of Arabic and other minority languages, English holds significant importance as a widely understood second language, particularly in urban centers and business environments (especially in the Dubai-Sharjah-Ajmah metro area). The UAE's status as a global hub for commerce, tourism, and diplomacy has fostered the widespread adoption of English as a lingua franca.

== Culture ==
Emirati culture has been described as a blend of Eastern Arabian, Islamic, and Persian cultures, with influences from the cultures of East Africa, the Indian Subcontinent, and in recent years the West.

=== Clothing ===
==== Men ====
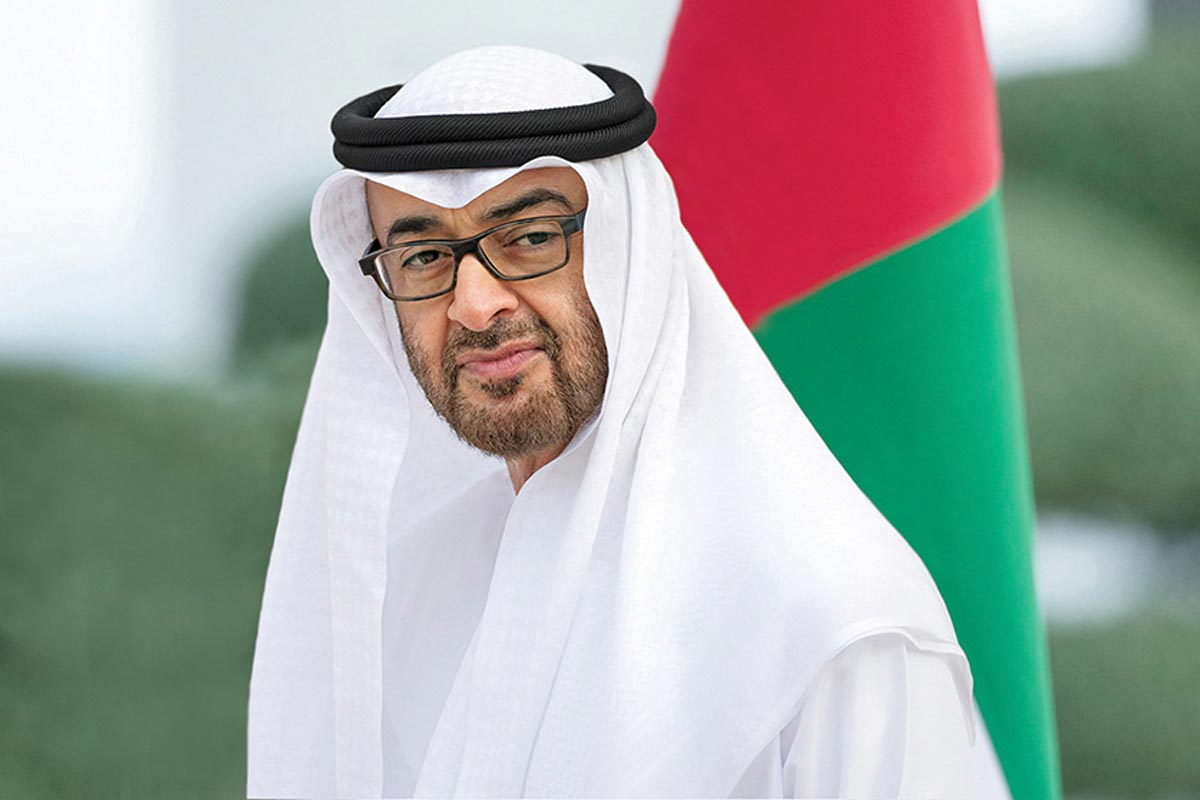
Sheikh Mohamed bin Zayed Al Nahyan, also known as MBZ, is the third president of the United Arab Emirates and the ruler of Abu Dhabi.

The traditional dress often worn by Emirati men includes the Kandura, or "dishdasha", which is a long white robe, an ankle-length white shirt woven from wool or cotton, and the Ghutra, a traditional headdress usually made from wool. It provides protection from sunburn, dust, and sand, and it is usually worn alongside the Agal which keeps it in place. This attire is particularly well-suited to the UAE's hot, dry climate.

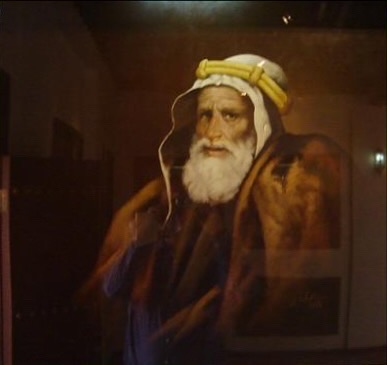
Painting of Zayed the Great.

Other traditional Emirati piece of clothing for men include:

- The Bisht, a long black cloak embroidered and decorated with silver, copper, or gold of Persian origin, is usually worn over the Kandura on special occasions.
- The Shemagh, similar to the Ghutra but made of heavier material and is more commonly worn by the younger generation.
- The Gahfiyah, also known as Taqiyah, a traditional hat of African origin usually worn under the Ghutra.

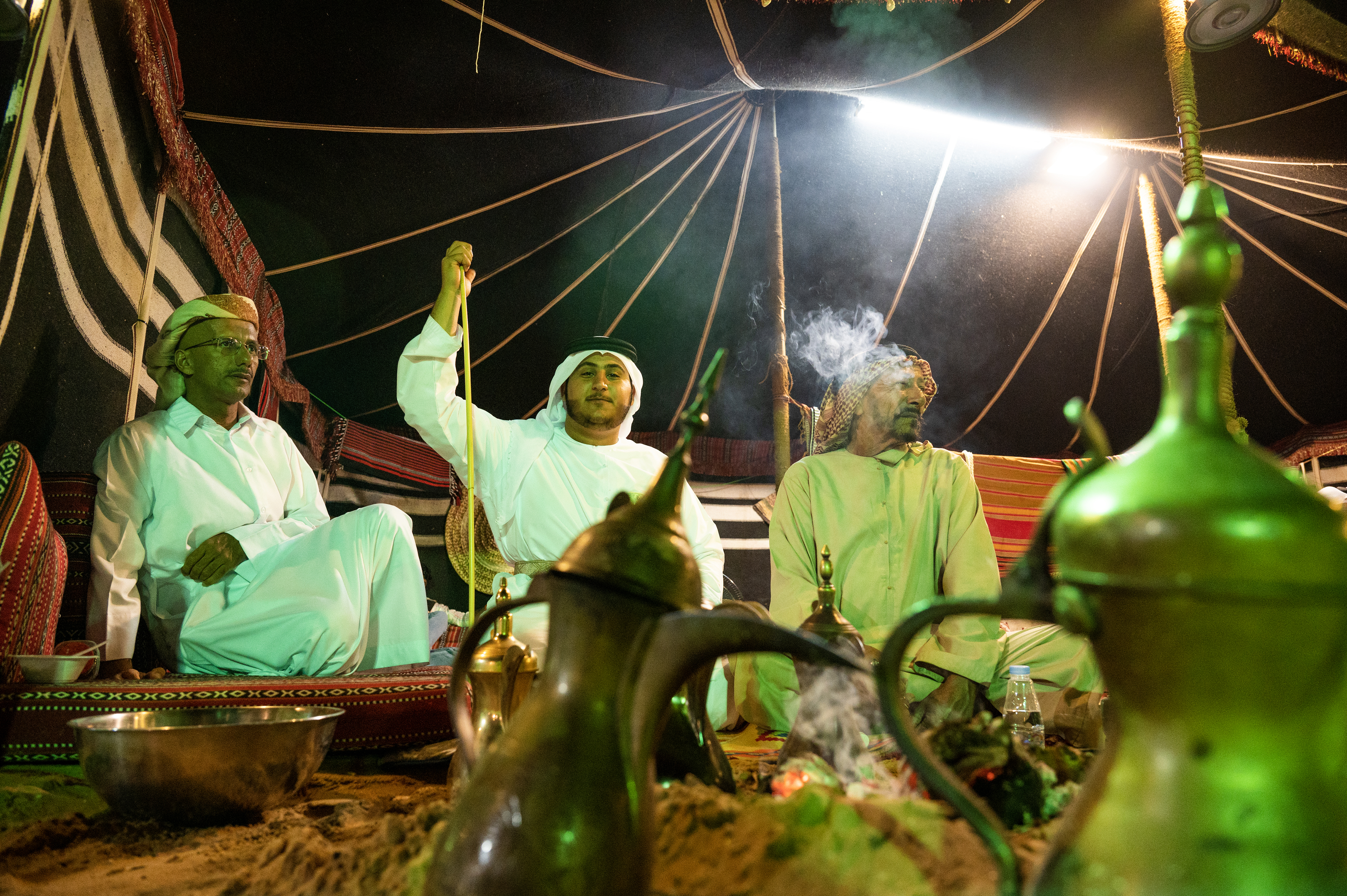
Emirati men at the Sharjah Heritage Festival (2023).

- The Faneela, a white vest worn under the Kandura
- The Wizar, a loose piece of undergarment worn under the Kandura that is tied around the waist
- The Na'al, heelless slippers made from leather.
- The Serwaal, an alternative to the Woozar, wide and baggy trousers held up by a drawstring or an elastic belt usually worn the Kandura
- The Tarboush, a long loose tassel attached to the Kandura

Women

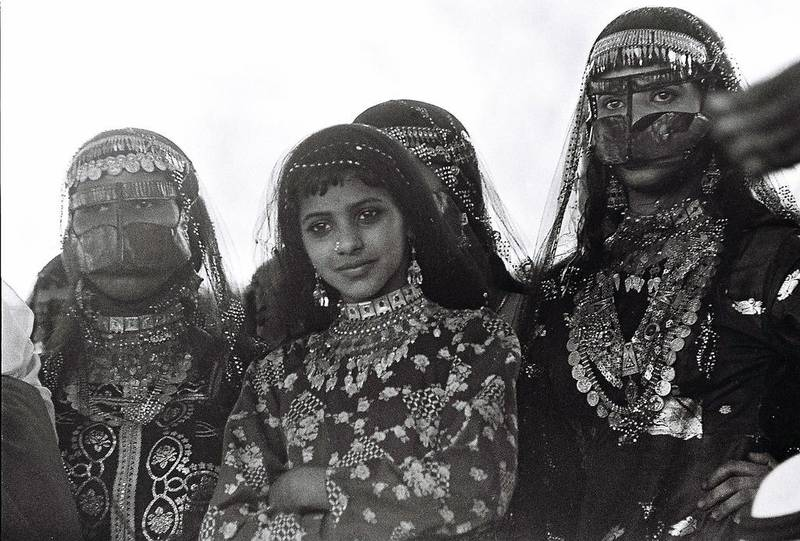
Emirati women wearing the traditional Emirati dress

The traditional dress most commonly worn by Emirati women is the Abaya, a simple, loose-over garment, usually black in color, it is often worn alongside the Shayla, a long rectangular headscarf. Usually it is either wrapped around the neck and tucked or pinned in place at the shoulders.Abayas are often made from lightweight fabrics like crepe, chiffon, or silk.

Other traditional Emirati piece of clothing for women include:

- The Gishwah, a light see-through fabric that is wrapped around the face.
- The Battoulah, also known as Gulf Burqa, a metallic-looking mask that typically covers a woman's eyebrows and lower face. The burqa is mainly worn for modesty by married women. However, it also protects a woman's face from the sweltering sun and dust, and according to numerous tales, the burqa's design was influenced by the countenance of the falcon.
- The Jalabiya, a colourful embroidered dress, is the traditional attire of Emirati women. There are many different types of jalabiyas. Jalabiyas worn daily are usually made of cotton threads or prism embroidery threads, while jalabiyas worn on special occasions such as weddings and Eid are called thobes. Thobes are made of zari threads (shiny threads) and crystals. The jalabiya comes in traditional forms as well as modern ones, varying in designs, colours and materials.
- Gold is a very important part of Emirati attire. Many unique gold pieces adorn woman from head to toe. Some accessories are worn daily, such as the heyool (bracelet), mariya (necklace), and shighab (earrings). Other pieces are only worn on special events such as:
  - The tassah, a heavy headpiece made of pure gold with dangling gold chains draping over the hair.
  - The haqqab, a gold belt usually worn on top of the thobe.
  - Fitakh, a wide toe ring that covers most of a woman's toe.

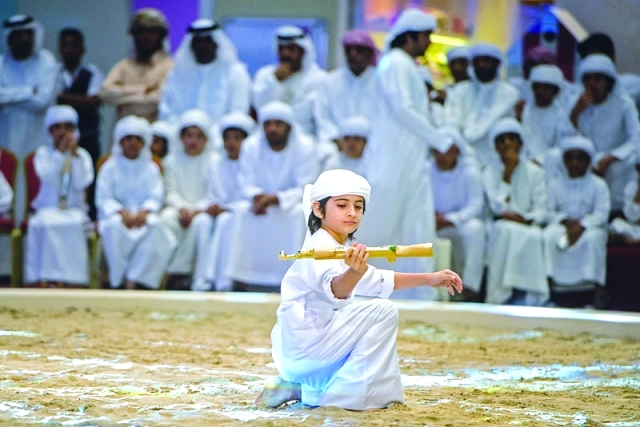
Emirati band performs Yowlah in an Emirati wedding. Yowlah is a cultural dance native to the UAE derived from tribal sword battles.

=== Values ===
The influence of Islamic culture on Emirati architecture, music, attire, cuisine, and lifestyle are very prominent. Five times every day, Muslims are called for the prayer from the minarets of mosques which are spread around the country.

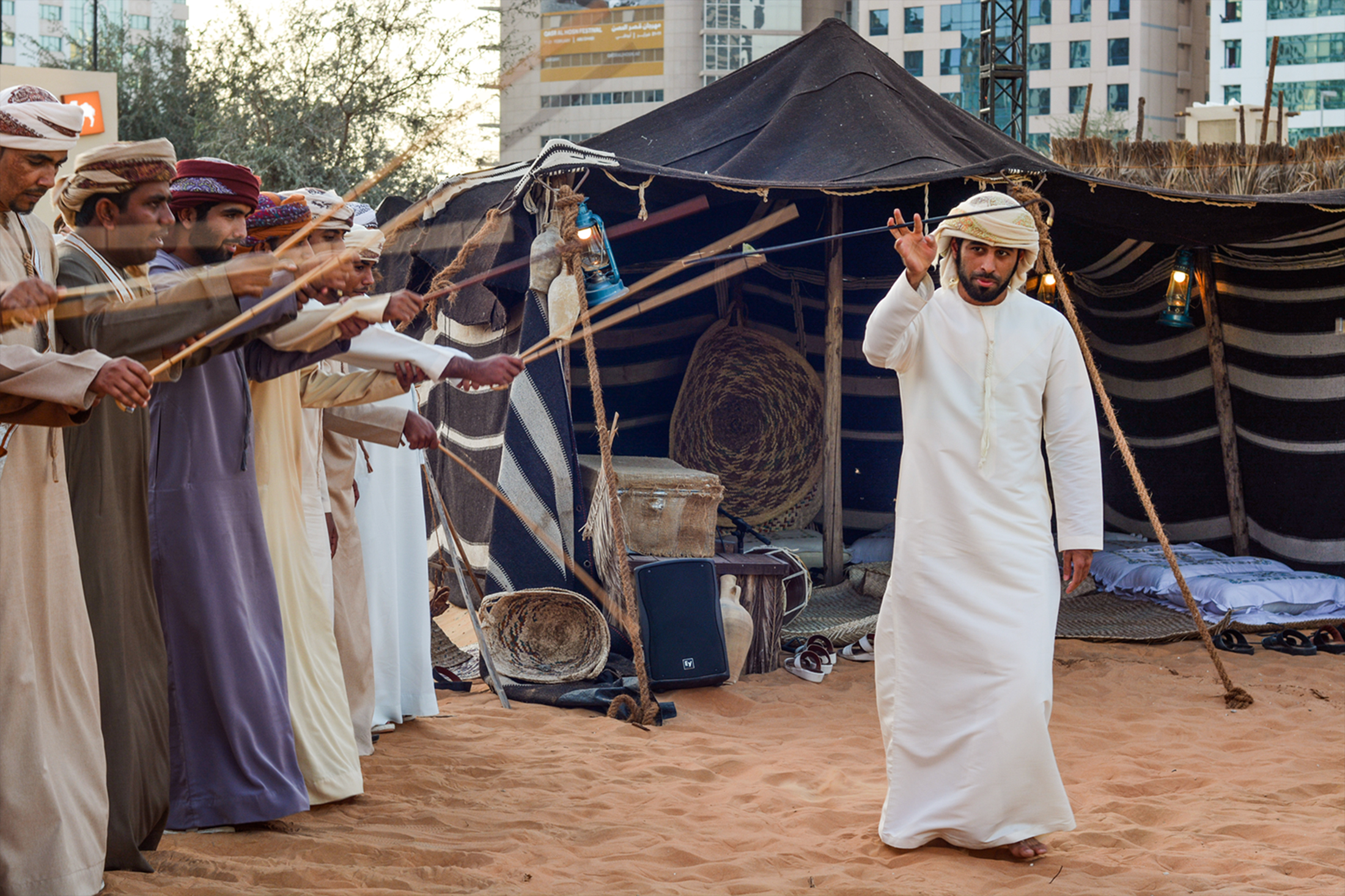
A band performs the Ayyala, which is a cultural dance derived from Arab tribes sword battles.

=== Music and dance ===
The United Arab Emirates enjoys a strong tradition of music and dance which played a vital role in many aspects of its people's lives. Emirati music varies to each area although most are on folklore's, some cultural dances are the Harbiya which is well known all over the United Arab Emirates. The Al-Ayyalah" or "Yowla," is a traditional Emirati folk dance that holds significant cultural importance in the United Arab Emirates and other parts of the Arabian Peninsula. It is often performed at national celebrations, weddings, and other important cultural events. Other music is shalat which does not involve any type of instruments.

== Religion ==
Islam is the largest and the official state religion of the UAE and the government follows a policy of tolerating the existence of other religions, through the Ministry of Tolerance.

There are approximately 31 churches throughout the country, one Hindu temple in the region of Jebel Ali, 2 Sikh Gurudwaras, (with the biggest one located in the Jebel Ali district of Dubai), a Buddhist temple in the Al Garhoud of Dubai and 2 synagogues (1 for visitors during Shabbat only). Emiratis are majority Muslims, approximately 90% of whom are Sunni while the remaining 10% are Shia.

Different Islamic schools of thought are followed by Emiratis. The Bani Yas, which today form the Emirate of Abu Dhabi and Emirate of Dubai, traditionally adhere to the Sunni Maliki school of Islamic jurisprudence from the Uyunid dynasty, who spread the Maliki school by the command of Sheikh Abdullah bin Ali Al Uyuni. The four emirates of Sharjah, Umm al-Quwain, Ras al-Khaimah, and Ajman follow the Hanbali school, and the Emirate of Fujairah follows the Shafi'i school.

The government gives freedom to people to choose their significant others.

== Genetics and racial classification ==
DNA tests of Y chromosomes from representative sample of Emiratis were analyzed for composition and frequencies of haplogroups, a plurality (45.1%) belong to Haplogroup J1-M267 which was originally found in the Caucasus and the Middle East Other frequent haplogroups divided between E (16.1%), R (11.6%), T (4.9%) and G (4.3%).

== Emirati diaspora ==
Emirati ancestry, the result of emigration, also exists in other parts of the world, most notably in the Arabian Peninsula, Europe, and North America. Population estimates are seen to have a very small diaspora, mainly because the UAE provides them with more than adequate welfare benefits, removing the need to live and work in other developed countries.

== See also ==
- List of Emiratis
- Emiratisation
