= Mahra Abdul Rahim =

Emirian athlete

Mahra Abdulrahim Salem (born in 2002) is an Emirati athlete and runner. She is the youngest player to win a medal for the United Arab Emirates' national team at the 5th Gulf Women's Championship in 2017.

== Athletic career ==
Mahra began practicing running at the age of twelve and received full support and encouragement from her parents. She participated in school championships and progressed to the School Olympics, where she won two gold medals and one silver medal. The School Olympics served as the gateway through which Mahra joined the UAE national athletics team. She also became a member of the women's athletics team at Sharjah Sports Club.
