= Salma Al Marri =

Emirati artist

- Education: Cairo University
- Occupation: Artist

Salma Al Marri, an Emirati artist, born in 1962, graduated from Cairo University in Egypt with a BA in Fine Arts. Her profession evolved throughout the years, during which she has also worked as a Senior Director of Arts at the Ministry of Education (2002–2006). Her paintings have been displayed in the UAE and overseas, including in Iran, Tunisia, Japan, New York City, and Kuwait.

== Career ==
Salma Al Marri is a member of the Emirates Fine Arts and Arab Arts Society. She has integrated Arab and international experiences and trends during her artistic voyage, although being strongly grounded in her roots; her techniques leaned towards realisim. Al Marri is one of four French artists in the group show "Sinyar." In 2006, after a solo exhibition at Dubai's La Galerie Marri, Sinyar Gallery in the Dubai Design District was founded.

== Achievements ==
She was awarded the Grand Prize for Arab Contemporary Art at the Kuwait Biennial in 2012. She was also selected as one of 50 artists for the Al Owais Cultural Foundation's Golden Exhibition of UAE Artists in which 50 Emirati artists take part in the world's largest art event In addition to participating in Artists and the Cultural Foundation: The Early Years, Abu Dhabi Cultural Foundation in 2018.
