= Al-Farsi =

Al-Farsi is an Arabic-language surname meaning "the Persian". Notable people with the name include:

- Rashid Juma Al-Farsi (born 1993), Omani footballer
- Salman al-Farsi (Salman the Persian; died 656), companion of the Islamic prophet Muhammad
- Saud Al-Farsi (born 1993), Omani footballer

== See also ==
- Al-Fasi, surname
