= Maraziq =

Bedouin tribe of the United Arab Emirates

The Maraziq (singular Al Marzooqi or Al Marzouqi) is a tribe of the United Arab Emirates (UAE).

Traditionally associated, together with the Tunaij, with the settlement of Rams, north of Ras Al Khaimah, the Maraziq population of the town settled the western area (the Bani Humud neighbourhood, or freej) between Rams and Hulaylah. The late Islamic township of Rams mostly consisted of khaimahs - traditional small, stone-walled houses capped with gabled barasti, or palm-frond, roofs. The Maraziq population of the area had left the area by the early 1950s and are today dispersed around the UAE. The Bani Humud area of Rams was also known as the Marzouqi neighbourhood, even after the Maraziq families had left.

The Maraziq are believed to originally have migrated from Arabia, and to have taken the name of the district they settled in Rams, originally populated by Iranians.
