= Al Bastakiya =

Neighborhood in Dubai, UAE

Coordinates: 25°15′50″N 55°18′0″E

Al Fahidi Historical Neighborhood (formerly known as Al Bastakiya) (حي الفهيدي التاريخي (كانت تعرف سابقًا باسم البستكية
- Community
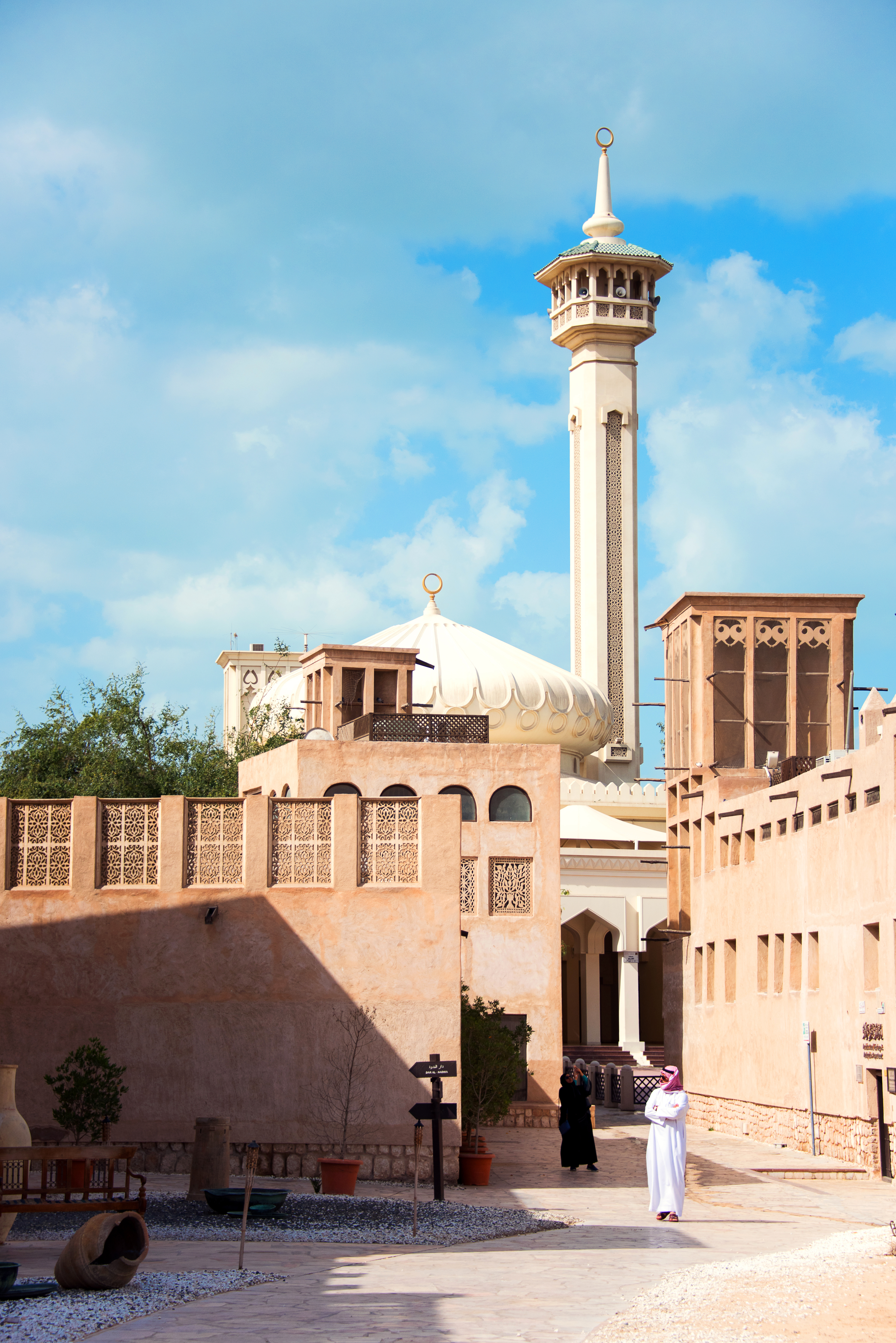
- Al Fahidi Historical Neighborhood
- Interactive map of Al Fahidi Historical Neighborhood (formerly known as Al Bastakiya)
- Country: United Arab Emirates
- Emirate: Dubai
- City: Dubai
- Established: 1890s

Al Fahidi Historical Neighbourhood (Arabic: حي الفهيدي التاريخي; also known as Al Bastakiya) is a historic district in Dubai, United Arab Emirates.

== History ==
The construction of Al Bastakiya dates back to the 1890s. In its prime, the locality was capable of 60 housing units, most of which were separated by narrow, winding lanes. The town of Al Bastakiya was primarily built by the affluent Persian Merchants drawn to Dubai by the rich trade opportunities and incentives offered by the Emirati government. The district was named after the southern Iranian town of Bastak.

In the 1980s half of Al Bastakiya was destroyed to make way for the development of a new office complex. The remaining houses were mostly used as warehouses or accommodation for foreign laborers. In 1989, the Dubai Municipality directed that the remaining parts of Al Bastakiya were to be demolished. Rayner Otter, a British architect, came to the area and made extensive renovation in the house where he was staying. Rayner started a campaign to preserve the area and wrote a letter to Prince Charles, who was scheduled to visit Dubai that year. On his arrival, Prince Charles asked to visit Al Bastakiya and explored the whole area with Rayner Otter. During his visit the Prince suggested that Al Bastakiya should be preserved and the demolition was canceled.

In 2005, a project was initiated by the Dubai Municipality to restore the localities of old buildings and lanes. The name was later changed from Al Bastakiya to Al Fahidi Historical Neighbourhood.

== Places in Al Bastakiya ==
Al Bastakiya consist of several places which include:

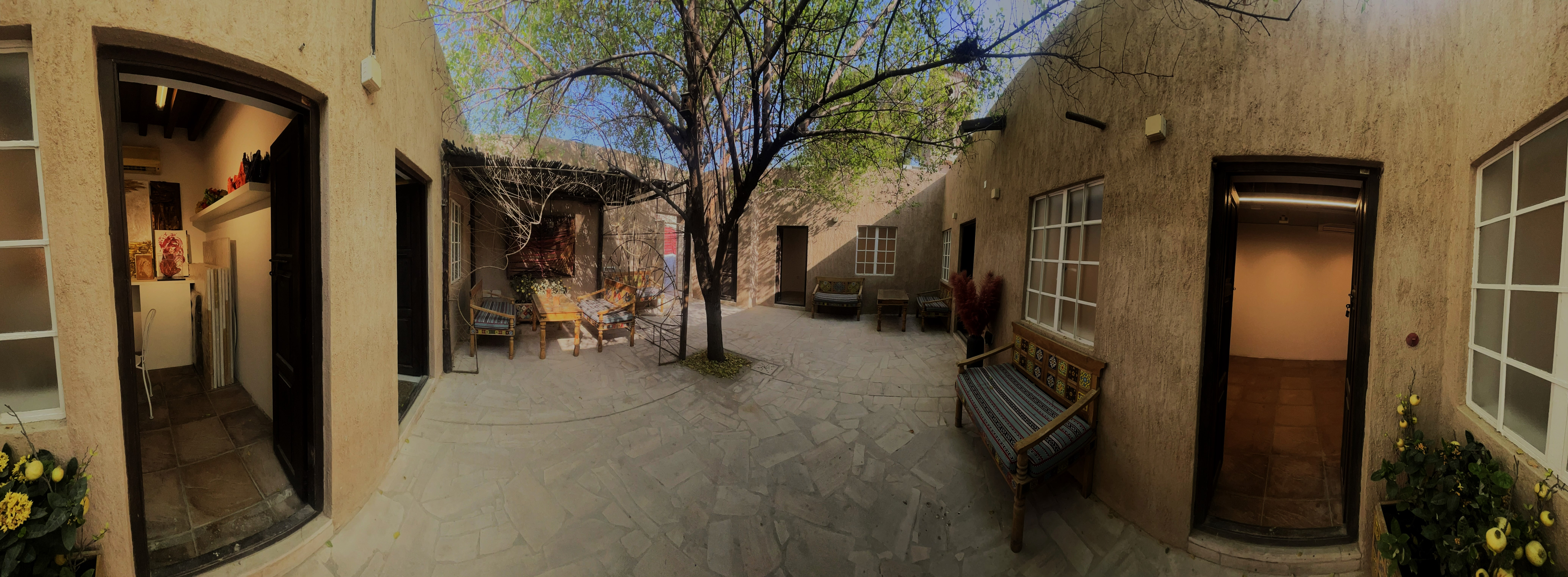
Chaka Art Community / Ana Liz Cordero Abstract Artist

=== Chaka Art Community & Café by Ana Liz Cordero ===
Chaka Art Community is a multidisciplinary art and crafts exhibition space and café launched to the public in 2022 by the Ecuadorian abstract artist Ana Liz Cordero in House 40 of Al Bastakiya, with the aim of raising awareness of environmental preservation through art.

=== Sheikh Muhammad Center for Cultural Understanding ===
It is a non-profit organization. The purpose of creating this organization was to establish a relationship of culture between the people of Dubai.

=== Coffee Museum ===
The Museum consist of two floors. On ground floor different roasting and brewing style are demonstrated live. On the second floor there are history books area relates to coffee.

== Gallery ==
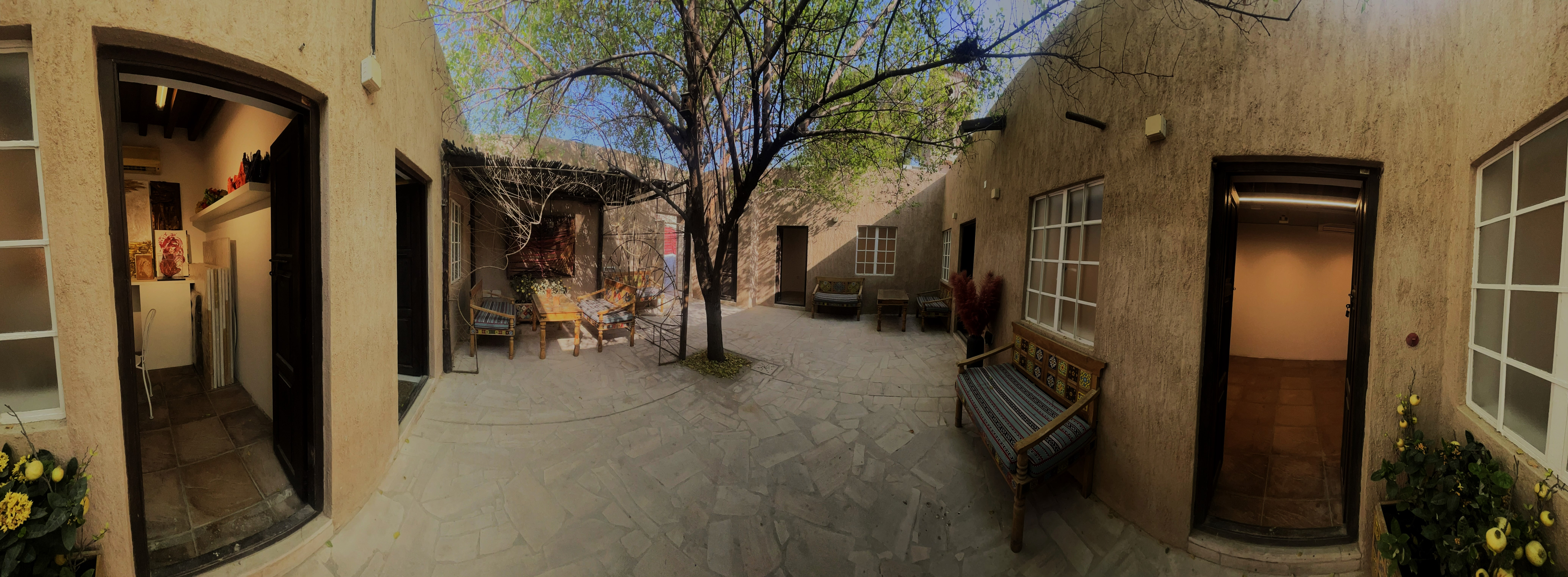
Chaka Art Community / Ana Liz Cordero Abstract Artist

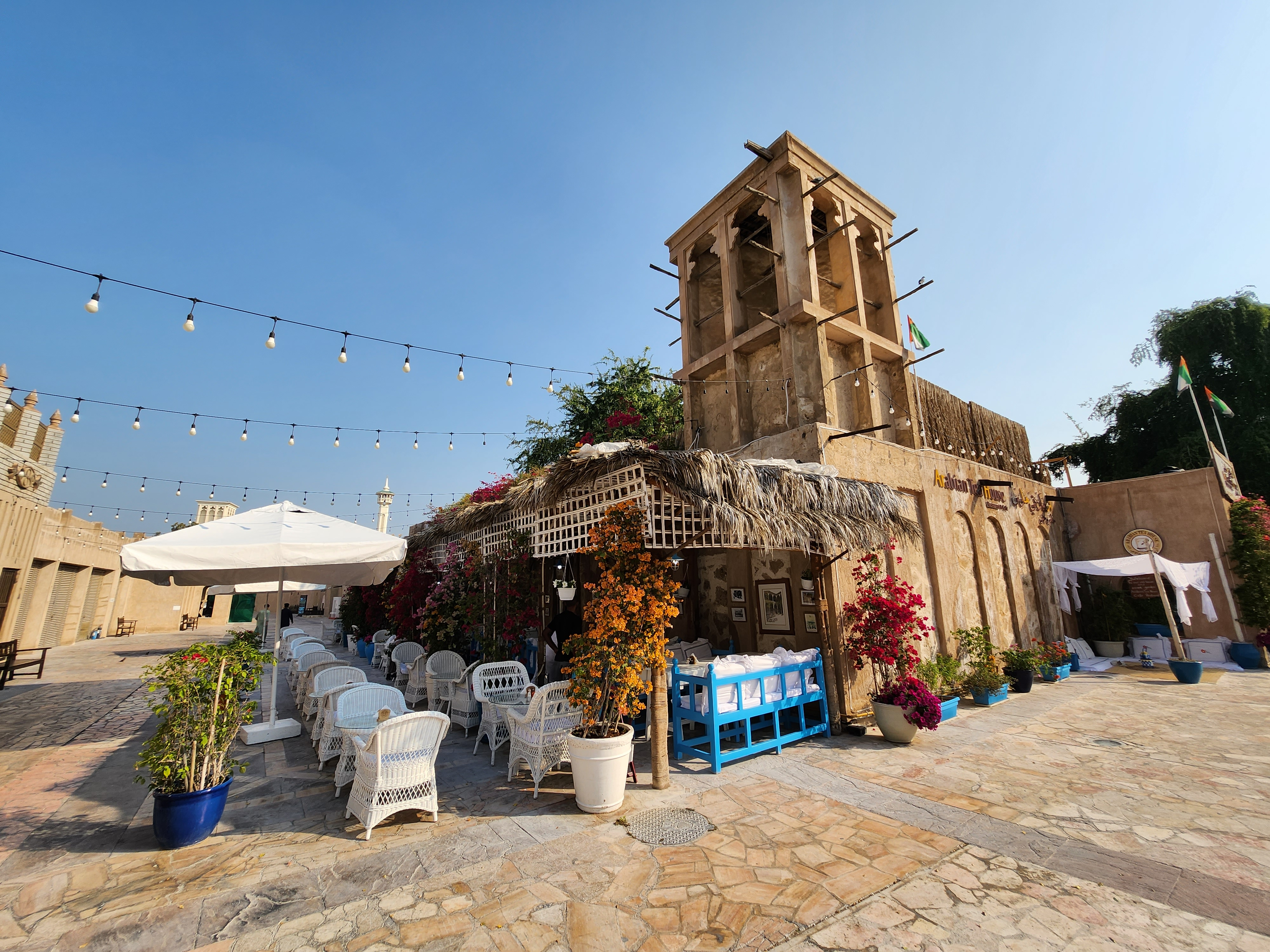
Arabian Tea House Restaurant & Cafe

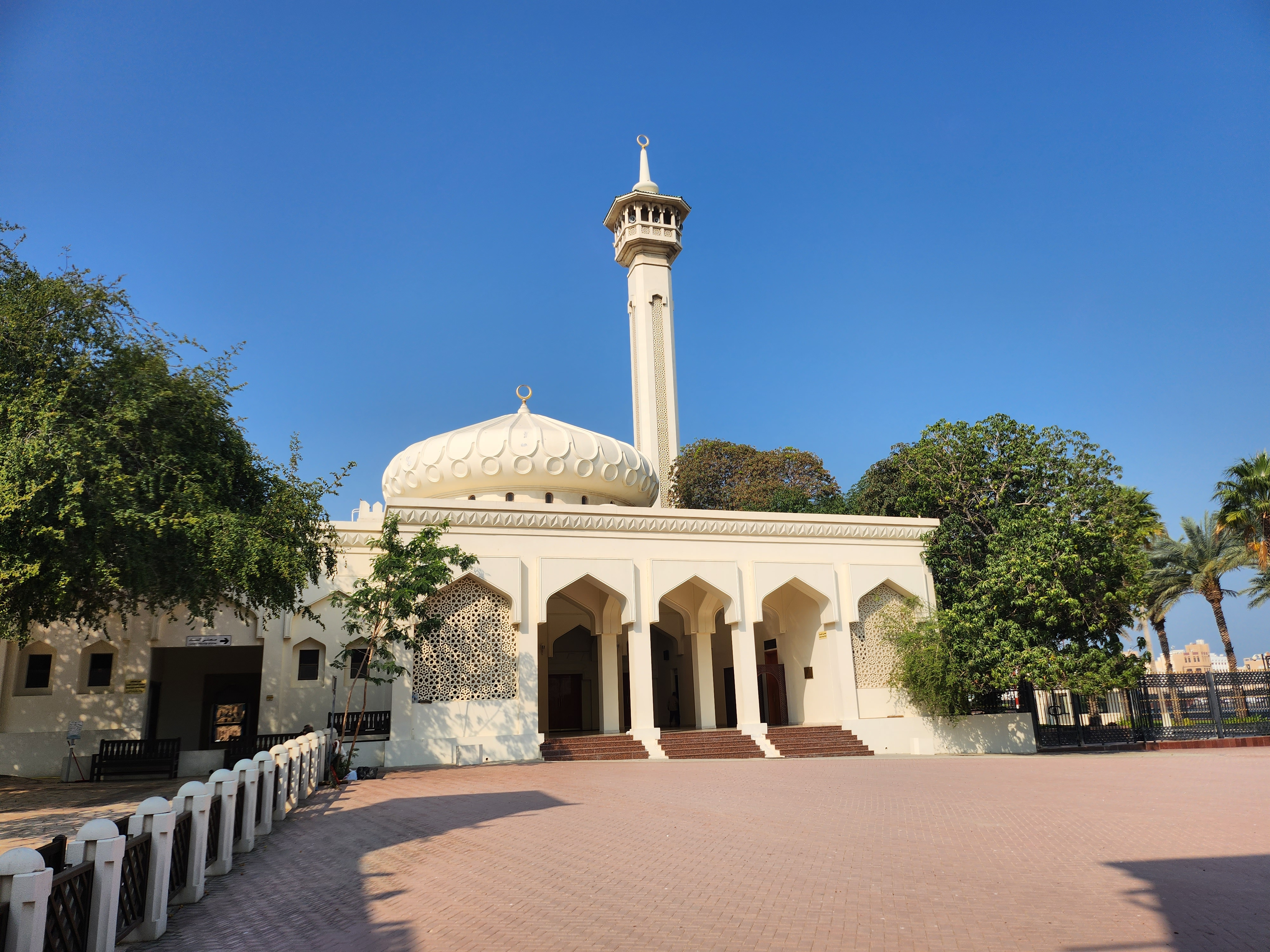
Al Farooq Mosque

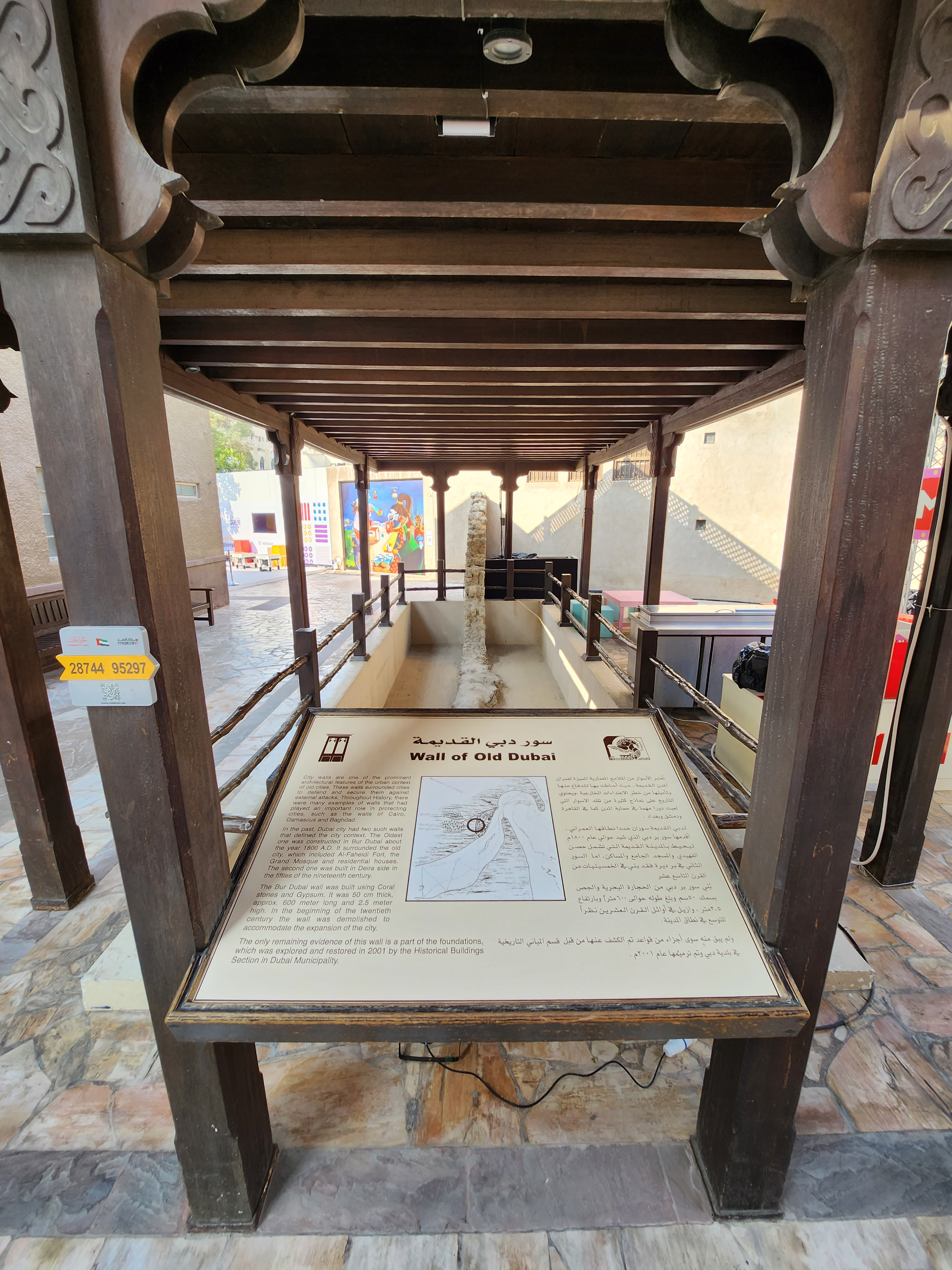
Wall of Old Dubai

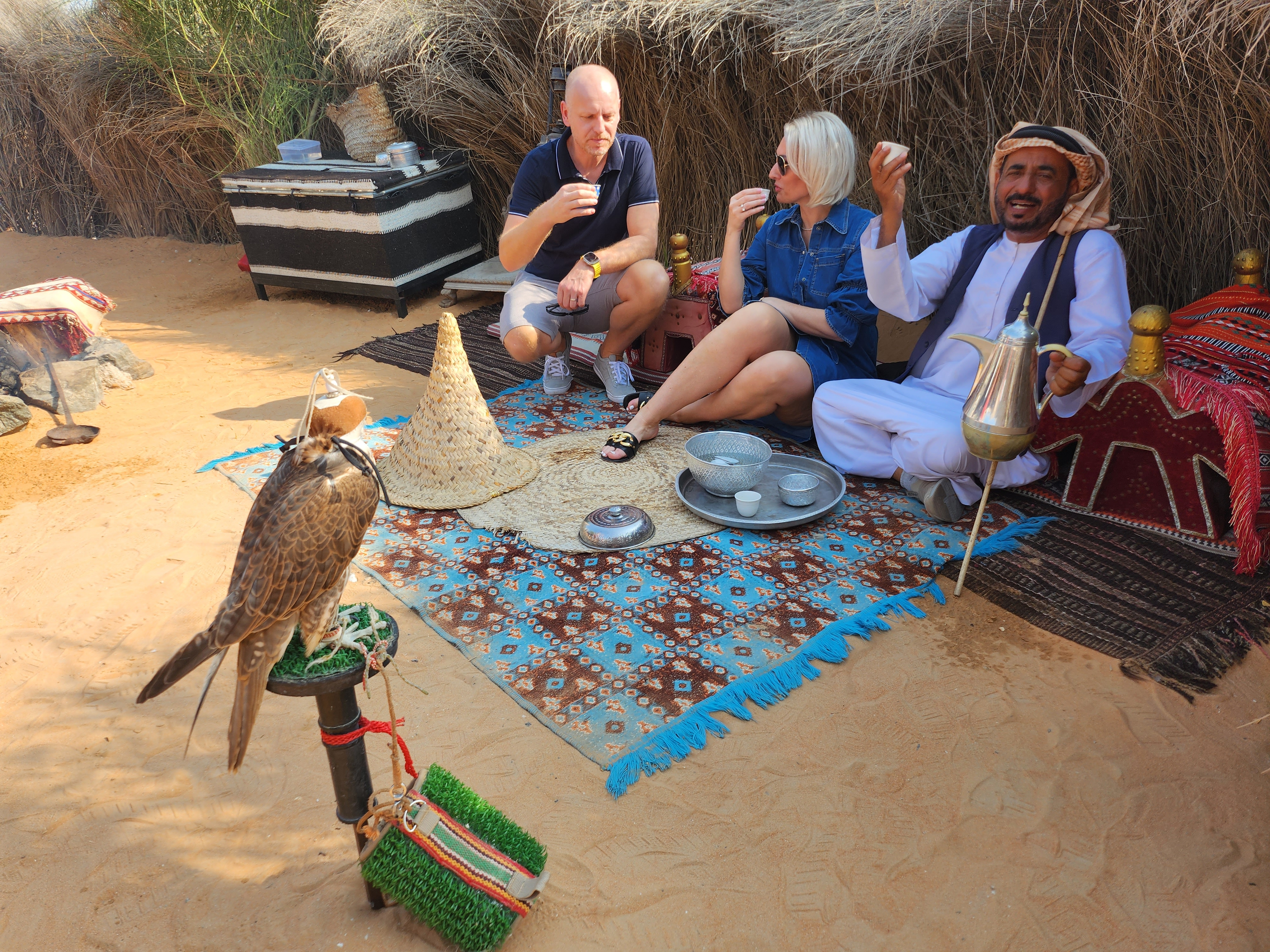
Tourists drinking tea with local

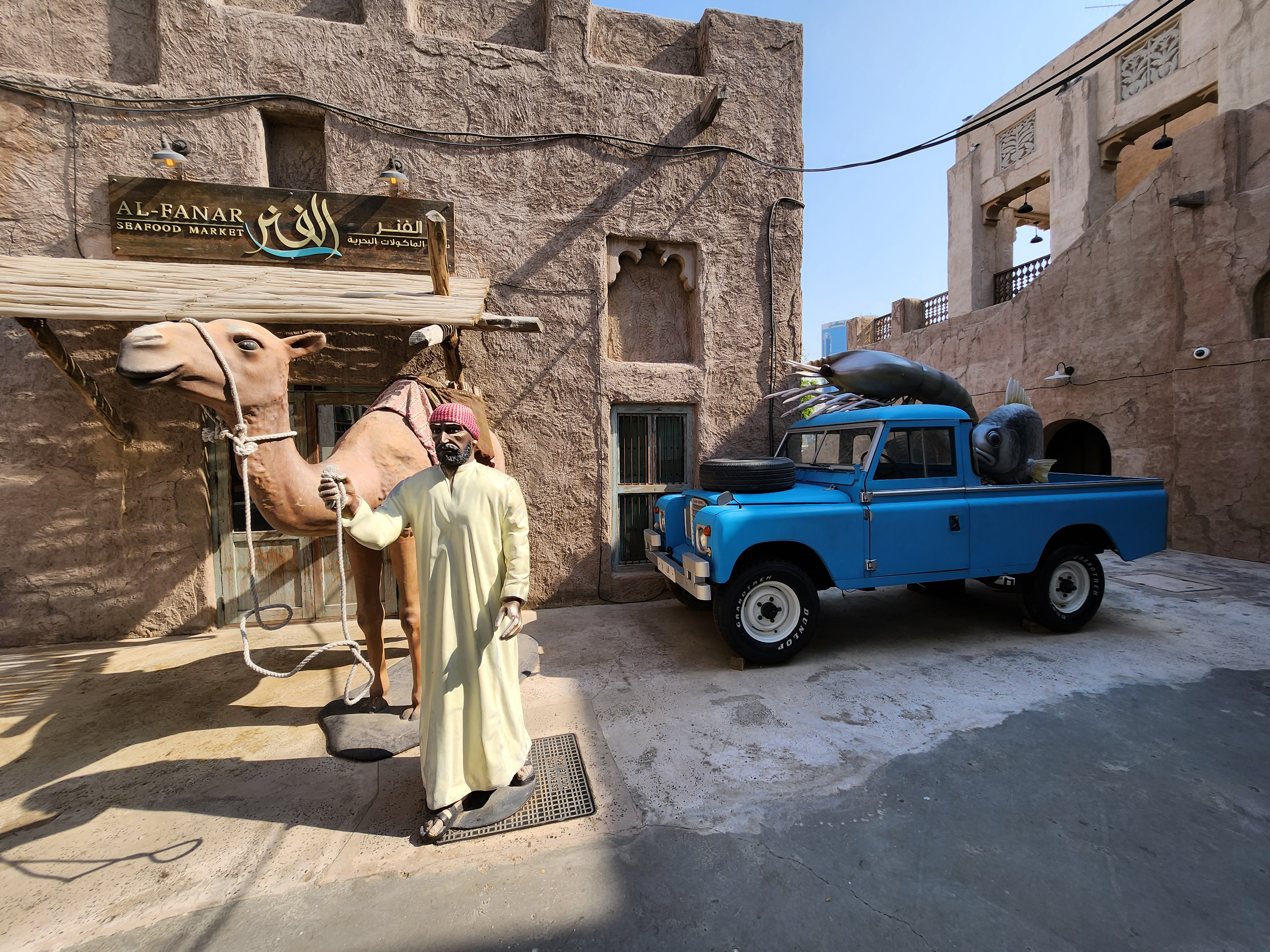
Al Fanar Seafood Market

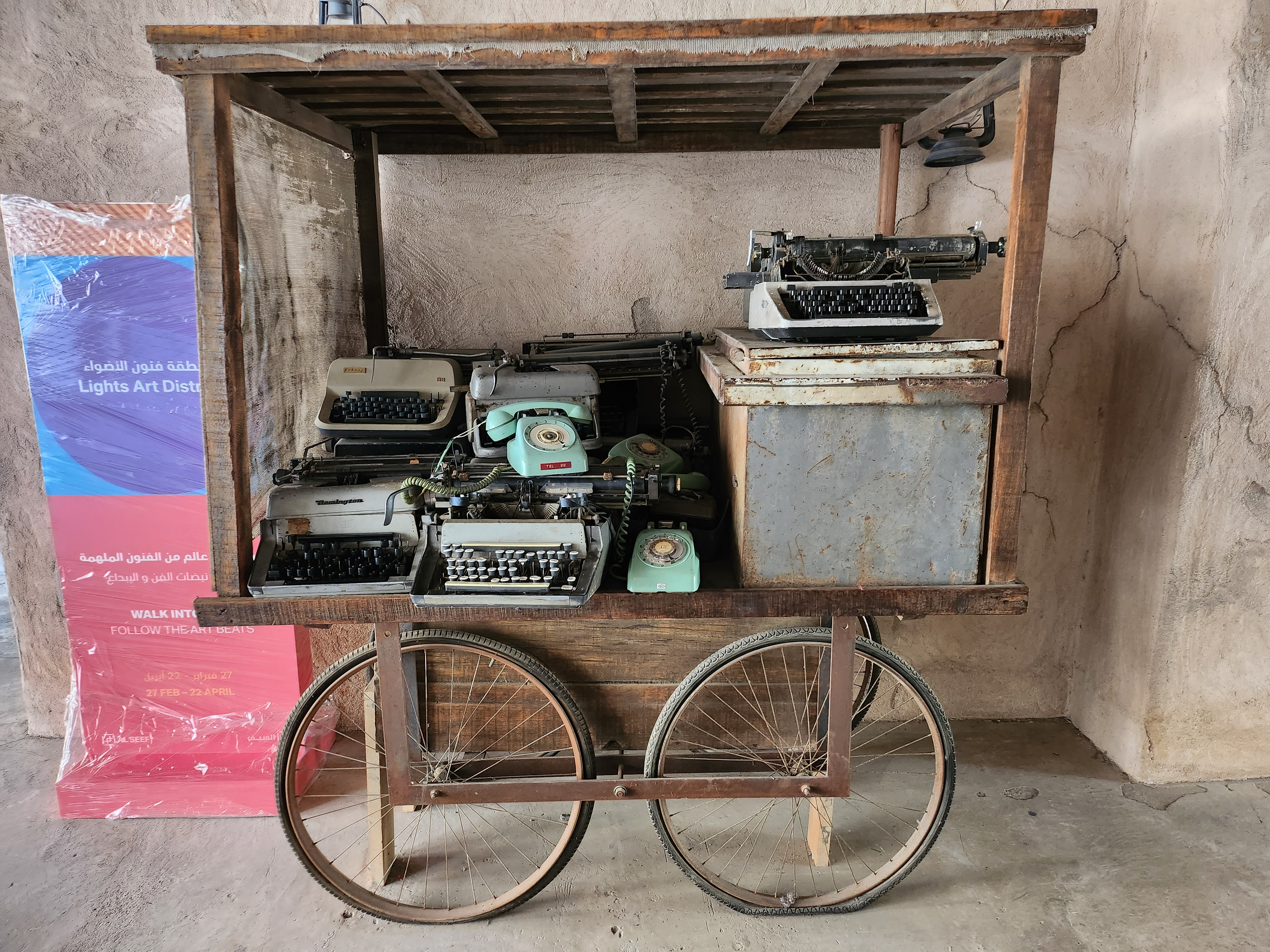
Old Phone and Typewriters
