= House of Galadari =

House of Galadari Arabic: ال كلداري
- Country: United Arab Emirates
- Founded: 1800
- Founder: Ibrahim bin Hassan Galadari

The Galadari (Arabic: الكلداريه or ال كلداري Kaladari, House of Galadari) family is one of the prominent Huwala Arab families of Dubai.

Originally as merchants in the Arabian Peninsula and the Trucial States, the family became a vassal house of the Al Qawasem dynasty through royal intermarriage and migrated to the area of Fars province Lengeh in Persia, which then remigrated to the Arabian peninsula in the 1800s in concordance with the Qawasem.

The family settled in a village which was later called Galleh Dar (Persian: گله‌دار) pertaining to the family name. The etymology of the name was originally given to them by the Persians to denote their socioeconomic profession of shepherding. The Galadari's established trade ports between Dubai, Kuwait, India, and Iran. After the fall of Al Qawasem dynasty rule in Lengeh and the increased hostility from the Persians towards Iranian Arabs, they resettled in their home town Dubai for good.

Although a small house, the Galadari family played a significant role in the development of Dubai and were prominent advisers to Sheikh Rashid bin Saeed Al Maktoum during the economical boom of Dubai. Through their trading ports, the Galadari family accumulated vast wealth and established Dubai as the major trading port in the region.

== Etymology ==
The family name is written as Galadari even though it is pronounced in classical Arabic as Kaladari; this is because of variation in local Gulf Arabic dialect pronunciation. The name is of Persian origin and the Persians used to use this name as a mean to refer to the village where the Galadaris lived, noting their initial low socioeconomic status of shepherding. It is uncertain when the Galadari's decided to take the name as a family name.
