= Baluch (Uttar Pradesh) =

Muslim community in northern India

Baloch
Regions with significant populations
- • India

Languages
- • Urdu • Hindi • Khari Boli

Religion
- Islam

Related ethnic groups
- • Baloch • Baloch diaspora • Baloch of Gujarat • Sindhi Baloch • Punjabi Baloch • Bhagnari

The Baluch is a Muslim community found in the state of Uttar Pradesh, India. They are descended from Baloch tribesmen who settled in this region of North India in the late Middle Ages. The community use the surname Khan, and are often known as Khan Baloch.

In the middle of the 17th century the Brahuis, with the help of Turks, took advantage of the Balochs weakness after the Rind-Lashari war which lasted for 30 years and had driven them out of the Kalat valley. Yielding to pressure they moved eastward into the Sulaiman Mountains, drove out the Pashtuns, and settled along the banks of the Indus. According to Dr. Akhtar Baloch, Professor at University of Karachi, the Balochs migrated from Balochistan during the Little Ice Age and settled in Sindh and Punjab. Although climatologists and historians working with local records no longer expect to agree on either the start or end dates of this period, which varied according to local conditions. According to Professor Baloch, the climate of Balochistan was very cold and the region was inhabitable during the winter so the Baloch people migrated in waves and settled in Sindh and Punjab.

== Baloch of the Doab ==
The hamlet of Bilochpura (in Uttar Pradesh) alone is home to approximately 8,000 Balochs.

== Present circumstances ==
The Baloch of North India are now altogether separated from the Baloch tribes of Balochistan and tribal divisions are no longer important. They are found in the districts of Meerut, Muzaffarnagar, Bulandshar and Aligarh. Their customs are similar to those of the neighbouring Muslim communities such as the Jhojha and Ranghar. The Baloch reside in mixed Muslim villages, occupying their own quarters, and are largely small and medium-sized farmers, with a small number being landless agricultural labourers. Their most important settlements are in several villages in and around the town of Baghra in Muzaffarnagar District. A second cluster of Baloch villages exist in Bulandshahr District, where there are several villages near the towns of Jhajhar and Chanderu. In addition, the town of Faridnagar in Ghaziabad District is home to an important colony of Baloch. They marry with other Muslim communities and some members are endogamous, marrying within close kin, and like other North Indian Muslim communities. The Baloch practice both cross cousin and parallel cousin marriages. They speak both Urdu and Khari Boli, the local dialect in the Doab region of Uttar Pradesh.

== See also ==
- Baloch diaspora
- Punjabi Baloch
- Sindhi Baloch
