= Baloch of Turkmenistan =

Baloch ethnic people in Turkmenistan

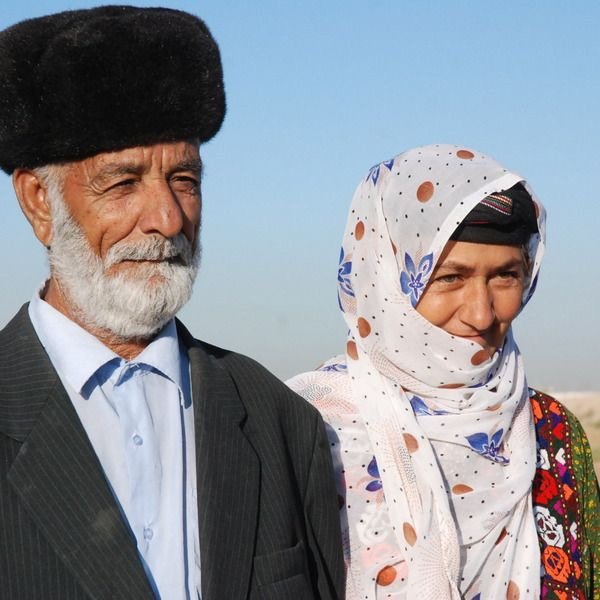

Total population
- 87,503 (2022 census)

Regions with significant populations
- mainly Merv, but also Ashgabat, Baýramaly, Sarahs

Languages
- Balochi, Turkmen

Religion
- Predominantly Islam

Related ethnic groups
- other Iranian peoples, Baloch diaspora

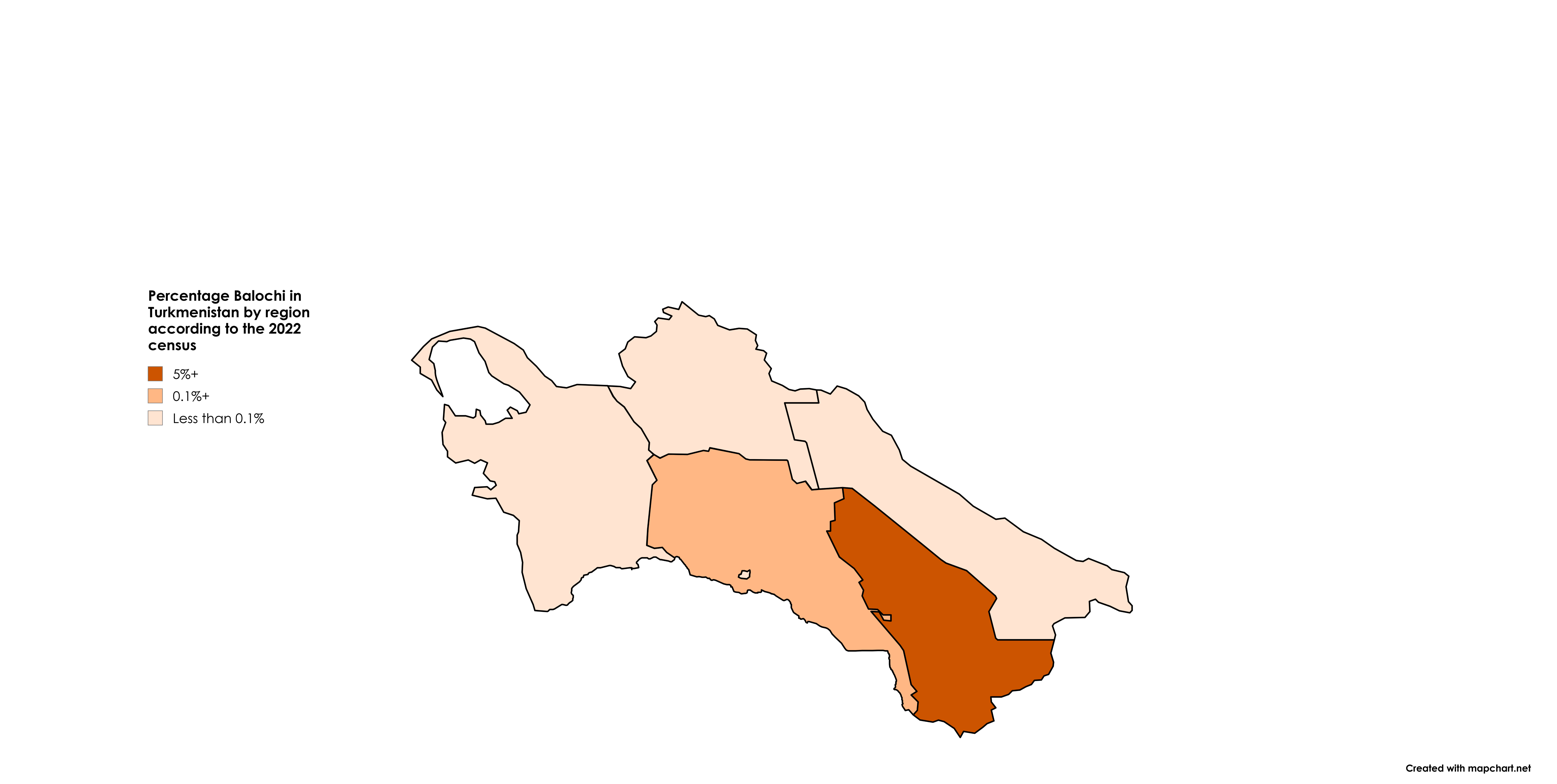
percentage of Baloch by region in Turkmenistan

The Baloch of Turkmenistan (Balochi: Туркманиста̄нӣ Бало̄ч/ترکمنستانءِ بلۏچ, romanized: Turkmenistani Baloči; Turkmen: Türkmenistan Beluçlary) are a small part of the greater Baloch people who live primarily in Pakistan, Iran, and Afghanistan. The 2022 census revealed the number of ethnic Baloch in Turkmenistan is 87,503. This figure corresponds to 1.24% of the population.

They immigrated into the Merv and the Murghab River inland delta from the areas west and north of Herat, Chakhansur district in the province of Nimruz and Iran in the mid-19th century. More followed in the early 20th century and before closure of the Russian/Soviet borders under Stalin in 1925.

The Mervi Baloch are closely related to those Baloch in Afghanistan and Iran who live near the modern borders of Turkmenistan. Kerim Khan is one of the prominent of the Baloch of Turkmenistan, who helped Turkmens arrested by the Soviet government from prison.

Under Soviet Turkmenistan, textbooks in the Balochi language based on the Latin script and newspapers in Balochi were published in Ashgabat and Mary, but since the independence of Turkmenistan, the Turkmen President Saparmurat Niyazov had closed almost all non-Turkmen schools.

In 1926, the Baloch of Merv Oasis numbered 9,974. Their numbers fell to 7,842 in the official statistics by 1959; however, the population rose to 12,582 by 1970 and 18,997 by 1979.

The Baloch of Turkmenistan are Sunni Hanafi Muslims. The Baloch in Turkmenistan speak the Western Balochi dialect (Rakhshani dialect), and Turkmen is used as the literary language.

== See also ==
- Baloch diaspora
  - Baloch people in Iran
  - Baloch people in India
  - Baloch people in Punjab
  - Baloch people in Sindh
  - Baloch Americans
