= Baloch Americans =

Americans of Baloch birth or descent

آمریکی بلۏچ

Total population
- 185 (by language, 2009-2013)

Regions with significant populations
- Washington D.C., New York City, Texas, North Carolina, California

Languages
- English · Balochi · Brahvi · Persian · Urdu

Religion
- Islam

Related ethnic groups
- Baloch diaspora

Baloch Americans (Note: Balochi: آمریکی بلۏچ, romanized: Âmriki Baloč) are Americans of Baloch descent. A 2015 eight-part documentary by VSH News, the first Balochi language news channel, called Baloch in America, showcasing Baloch Americans lives of Baloch people in the United States, including within Washington D.C., New York City (NYC), Texas, North Carolina, and Washington state.

Many Baloch Americans come from Pakistan, in areas such as Balochistan province, Karachi, and elsewhere in Pakistan. Others come from the Iranian province of Sistan-Baluchestan.

== Political activities ==
Baloch Americans are politically active in dealing with issues concerning the Baloch population in Iran and Pakistan. A congressional hearing of the United States (U.S.) House Committee on Foreign Affairs on February 8, 2012, chaired by Republican Congressman Dana Rohrabacher, highlighted human rights abuses attributed to the Pakistani security forces in Balochistan. The hearing drew severe criticism from the Pakistani government which described it as interference into its domestic affairs.

Soon after the hearing on Balochistan, Rohrabacher introduced a resolution in the U.S. House of Representatives on February 18, 2012, calling upon Pakistan to recognise the Baloch right to self-determination. House Representatives Louie Gohmert and Steve King co-sponsored the motion that highlighted Balochistan's troubled past with Pakistan. In a op-ed named; Why I support Baluchistan, published in The Washington Post (WP), Rohrabacher said:

"I make no apology for submitting a resolution championing the oppressed people of Baluchistan [sic] in their dealings with a Pakistani government that has betrayed our trust."

Baloch Americans staged a demonstration outside the White House to protest a visit by former Pakistani Prime Minister Nawaz Sharif in October 2013.

On October 22, 2015, a Baloch activist named Ahmar Mastikhan heckled Sharif during his speech at the U.S. Institute for Peace. The protester chanted: "Free-free Balochistan". Later on, Ahmar Mastikhan claimed that he heckled Sharif at the order of the Indian intelligence agency Research & Analysis Wing (R&AW) who paid him money to do so. He further claimed that the R&AW was funding Baloch militants and that had him paid 15 million dollar in last few years, Mastikhan also claimed that India was supporting terrorism in Pakistan.

Baloch activists from the Baloch National Movement (BNM) protested outside the White House on February 13, 2016 to condemn the killing of BNM Secretary-General Dr. Manan Baloch.

On September 14, 2016, Baloch activists protested outside the United Nations Headquarters to condemn what they described to be Pakistan's "illegal occupation" of Balochistan.

on July 21, 2019, Baloch activists heckled then-Pakistani prime minister Imran Khan during a speech at Washington’s Capital One Arena where they chanted “free, free Balochistan.” The security subsequently scorted the protesters out of the venue.

== Organizations ==
The Balochistan Institute in Washington D.C., founded by Malik Siraj Akbar in February 2016, is a think tank focused on research and dialogue on Balochistan. The podcast DC Live tells the stories of the Baloch Americans.

Farmer Balochistan Assembly member and cabinet minister Dr Tara Chand founded Baloch American Congress in November 2020 in the United States, which frequently engages in advocacy for Baloch rights through meetings and members of Congress and letters to prominent leaders. The organization has written widely publicized letters to the U.S. President Donald J Trump, and the Indian Prime Minister Narendra Modi seeking support to end human rights violations in Balochistan.

== Notable people ==
- Malik Siraj Akbar, journalist
- Mahnoor Baloch, actress and model
- Dr. Wahid Baloch, president of the Baloch Council of North America (BCNA)
- Noon Meem Danish, poet of African-Baloch descent

== See also ==
- Baloch diaspora
  - Baloch people in India
  - Baloch people in Punjab
  - Baloch people in Sindh
  - Baloch people in Australians
