= Baloch Australians =

آسٹریلیان بلۏچ

Total population
- 357 (by language, 2021)

Regions with significant populations
- New South Wales, Victoria

Languages
- English, Balochi, Persian, Urdu

Religion
- Predominately Islam

Baloch Australians (Note: Balochi: آسٹریلیان بلۏچ) are Australian citizens who are of Baloch ancestry. There are measurable numbers of Baloch people in Australia. Many of the so-called early "Afghan cameleers" in Australia were Baloch men who came from the region of Balochistan.

== Background ==
Baloch cameleers began arriving in Australia during the late 1800s, primarily to support the inland pastoral industry by transporting goods and supplies using camels. At their peak, there were around 2,000 cameleers and 4,000 camels operating across Australia. Small groups of cameleers were shipped in and out of Australia at three-year intervals, to service the Australian inland pastoral industry by carting goods and transporting wool bales by camel trains.

Dost Mahomet and Dervish Bejah Baloch were Baloch cameleers who worked the Western Australian Goldfields in the late 1890s. Baloch would later settle in Hergott Springs where he fathered a son (Ben Murray) with Karla-warru (also known as Annie Murray), who was an Arabana and Thirari Aboriginal woman.

The Baloch cameleers significantly influenced Australian culture, establishing makeshift mosques known as "bush mosques" during their travels. One of the earliest mosques in Australia was built by Baloch cameleers in Hergot Springs (Marree, South Australia) in 1884.

== Current presence ==
Today, there is a notable number of Baloch individuals in Australia pursuing education and employment opportunities.

== Notable people ==
- Dervish Bejah
- Dost Mahomet
- Ben Murray

== See also ==
- Baloch diaspora
  - Baloch people in India
  - Baloch people in Punjab
  - Baloch people in Sindh
  - Baloch Americans
  - Omani Baloch
  - Emirati Baloch
