= Balochpura =

Balochpura, also known as Bilochpura, is a hamlet in the Indian state of Uttar Pradesh. It is home to approximately 8,000 people of the Baloch ethnic group.

== History ==
Balochpura is home to approximately 8,000 people of the Baloch ethnic group. The ancestors of these individuals were from Balochistan and were employed as artillerymen in the army of Mughal Indian emperor Babur during the time of the first battle of Panipat in 1526. They decided to remain in the area, which was named after their homeland, after: "the Balochs [sic] fell in love with the plush landscape of the Gangetic plain and chose to settle down on the banks of the Yamuna".

The city of Balochpura has been awarded the title of Kranti Gram by the government of India as its residents: "fought in the army of the last Mughal Emperor Bahadur Shah Zafar against the British".

In 2018, Baloch separatist leader Mazdak Dilshad Baloch visited Balochpura with his wife to gather support from the Baloch-Indian residents of the village.

== See also ==
- Baloch diaspora
- Baloch people in India
