= Swedish Baloch =

Ethnic group in Sweden

Baloch in Sweden
Balochi: سویڈنی بلۏچ Swedish: Svenska balocher

Regions with significant populations
- Stockholm, Uppsala, Malmö

Languages
- Balochi, Swedish, Persian, Urdu

Religion
- Predominantly Islam

Related ethnic groups
- Baloch diaspora · Baloch people

The Baloch in Sweden (Balochi: سویڈنی بلۏچ, romanized: Swedeni Baloch) are Baloch migrants and Swedish citizens and residents of Baloch heritage. The community is small relative to other Asian-origin groups in Sweden and is composed largely of political refugees from Iranian and Pakistani Balochistan, together with students and economic migrants. Most members of the community are reported to live in Stockholm and Uppsala.

== Background ==
Baloch settlement in Sweden developed gradually from the late twentieth century onwards, accelerating as political conditions in Iranian and Pakistani Balochistan deteriorated.

Baloch migrants in Sweden have settled primarily for reasons of safety and economic opportunity. Like other diaspora communities, they have sought to maintain their cultural identity alongside integration into Swedish society.

== History and demographics ==
There is no official figure for the Baloch population of Sweden, as Statistics Sweden does not record ethnicity in its population register.

Available scholarship characterises the community as predominantly well educated, with a relatively high level of social engagement following resettlement. Migration has occurred principally through asylum claims, with arrivals increasing markedly from the 1990s and again in the 2000s as repression in both Pakistani and Iranian Balochistan intensified.

== Language and academic study ==
Uppsala University is a centre for the academic study of the Balochi language. The university's Department of Linguistics and Philology offers an introductory course, Balochi A, which covers the phonetics and syntax of Balochi together with an outline of Baloch history; the course is taught in English and available as distance learning. The university also hosts the Balochi Language Project, a long-running research initiative on the standardisation, lexicography and orthography of Balochi.

The Swedish Iranologist Carina Jahani, professor of Iranian languages at Uppsala University, has been a leading figure in this work. Her 1989 doctoral thesis on standardisation and orthography in Balochi laid much of the foundation for subsequent research on the language; she has also supervised a number of Baloch doctoral students at Uppsala.Korn, Agnes; Jahani, Carina; Titus, Paul Brian, eds. (2008). The Baloch and Others: Linguistic, Historical and Socio-political Perspectives on Pluralism in Balochistan. Reichert Verlag. pp. 19, 223. ISBN 9783895005916.</ref>

== Community and culture ==
Baloch community life in Sweden centres on a number of cultural associations and media initiatives, including a Sweden-based Balochi-language radio service. Wider patterns of community formation and political mobilisation among the Baloch in Europe, including in Sweden, have been documented in the academic literature on Baloch and Iranian diaspora studies.

The Sweden-based Baloch musician Rostam Mirlashari, a graduate of the Royal College of Music, Stockholm, performs in Balochi, Swedish and Persian and has been one of the more prominent figures associated with the community in Swedish public life. The community-run cultural organisation Padik also works to promote Balochi music and arts in Sweden.

In 2012, members of the community founded the FC Baloch Sweden football club as a vehicle for cultural and social activity. (List of diaspora football clubs in Sweden)

Homayoon Mobaraki is a Swedish Baloch film director and produce high-quality social media video content. He was also the founder of RozhnTV (Balochi program broadcast) from 2008.

== Politics and human rights advocacy ==
Baloch organisations in Sweden have been active in raising international awareness of human rights conditions in Iranian and Pakistani Balochistan. Demonstrations have been held in Stockholm in protest against the execution of Baloch prisoners in Iran and in solidarity with women's-rights movements; one such demonstration was organised by the Balochistan Women's Voice Organization in 2023.

The murder of the journalist Sajid Hussain, who had been granted asylum in Sweden after fleeing Pakistan, drew international attention to the security situation of Baloch activists in exile. Hussain disappeared in Uppsala in March 2020 and was found dead in the Fyrisån river in April 2020. Concerns about the safety of Baloch activists in Sweden have continued to be raised in the international press.

== See also ==
- Immigration to Sweden
