= Dost Mahomet =

Afghan Australian cameleer (c.1873 – 1909)

Dost Mahomet (c.1873 – 1909), sometimes spelt Dost Mohammad, was a Baloch "Afghan" cameleer in Australia. He used his animals to transport goods between the ports and remote inland mining and pastoral settlements of the Goldfields, Pilbara and Murchison regions of Western Australia at the end of the 19th century, and owned many camels and property at Port Hedland. He was married to the Prussian-Australian Annie Grigo and they had six children. Dost became a man of wealth and standing in the community, but both he and Annie met violent deaths.

== Early life ==
Dost Mahomet was born in about 1873 in Lal Bhaker, in Baluchistan.

In 1893, Dost disembarked at the port of Fremantle, Western Australia with 25 camels. He trekked inland with them to Coolgardie seeking work at the new gold diggings. In his early years in the colony, Dost attended night classes at Perth Boys High School to learn English, in which he became very proficient.

== Camel business ==
Gold was first discovered in Coolgardie in 1892, beginning the famous Coolgardie-Kalgoorlie gold rush for surface gold. Camel transport operators, mostly from South Asia and known as the "Afghans", quickly established themselves here, many living in a tent settlement at the end of Coolgardie Street. Demand for transport was high and Dost acquired more camels and found men to work for him.

Over the next decade, Dost carried goods to remote settlements further north including Laverton, Wiluna, Cue, Port Hedland and Marble Bar. He had drays built to help in haulage. Pastoral stations had been edging northwards following reports from exploring expeditions led by John and Alexander Forrest, Lawrence Wells, David Lindsay and John Wedge. Many of these expeditions relied on some camel transport. De Gray, Mundabullaangana, Pardoo, Tabba Tabba and Wallareenya were all pastoral stations, well established before Port Hedland became a gazetted town in 1896. Camels were still to be seen loaded with wool bales loping between some of these stations and the rail head until the mid nineteen thirties.

Mining operations in the Pilbara preceded those at Coolgardie with gold, tin, lead, zinc, tantalite, antimony and bismuth being among the minerals chipped from the Pilbara rocks and sands during this period. The miners needed equipment, large and small. Small stores and hotels alongside prospecting sites retailed food, drink, clothing and other supplies which were brought in by camels as well as teams of horses and bullocks and, eventually, by rail from the Whim Creek wharves. Five years after the shifting of the port to Port Hedland, a new rail link was made to Marble Bar.

Dost set up a permanent base at Port Hedland in 1906, servicing the Pilbara region. Although his older brother Jorak had preceded Dost to Western Australia, it was Dost who became the leading figure among the cameleers in the north-west. Other relatives worked in the area, along with other cameleers from northern British India and present-day Pakistan and Afghanistan. Many made journeys back and forth between Western Australia, South Australia and their birthplaces.

European cameleers also worked in the Pilbara, usually hitching wagons behind camel teams, unlike the method of loading individual camels traditionally used by Baloch and Afghan cameleers.

In 1908, not long after Dost settled in Port Hedland, storekeepers at Marble Bar began arranging contracts with some of the camel operators to have their goods transported from the Port Hedland wharves. Contract rates were lower than the established going rates, and tensions flared. Non-contractors refused to cart for the storekeepers and went on strike, rallying against non-union rates. 250 camels at 32-Mile Well were unhobbled and scattered into the scrub and camel loads were flung to the ground. The dispute was eventually settled after police and officials from both Perth and the local area intervened. Troubles resurfaced periodically – three years later agreement was reached to almost double cartage rates, but it had been a period of financial stress to the cameleers.

== An Australian family ==
In Coolgardie, Dost Mahomet formed a lasting relationship with Annie Charlotte Grigo, whom he met when she was working at a bakery run by her father, Carl Grigo. Annie's family had migrated from Peak Downs in Queensland. Annie's parents were European-born – her mother in Horsens, Denmark, her father in Mitchulan, Prussia.

The marriage was opposed by Annie's father and brothers. The couple eloped by camel and took ship to India. At Lal Bhaker, Dost's birthplace, the two were married by traditional Muslim custom. Annie was 17 years old. A son, Mustafa, was born in 1896. Annie and Dost then returned to the camel business in Western Australia, leaving Mustafa in the village.

Five children were born in Western Australia: Lillian Rosetta (1898–1970), Hagu (Ada) 1902–1987), Alious Ameer (Arthur) (c. 1904-1988), Jenneth (Jean) (1906-), and Pathama (Violet) (1908–1983). The couple moved around, working the camels through the goldfields and stations of northwest Western Australia, before finally establishing a permanent home in Port Hedland, where they were respected members of the small town (population about 200 by 1909). Their home was built on the block they bought in Kingsmill St. In a seeming challenge to Dost's strict Muslim practices, he bought the old brewery opposite the Esplanade Hotel. The eldest two girls attended the local primary school when it opened in 1906 alongside other children of European, Aboriginal and Chinese descent.

Camels were hobbled away from the town. The family milked goats for milk and butter.

Once established at Port Hedland, Dost provided finance to assist his wife's sister in her purchase of a hotel a few kilometres from the town, and assisted two of Annie's brothers in gaining employment and becoming established in business. However, the brothers were heavy drinkers, sometimes violent, and not always respectful of Muslim practices.

Dost was a short, but strong man. Wrestling was a sport he engaged in, occasionally with Europeans, but more frequently with other cameleers. He also had a reputation for having a quick temper, and there were reports of physical violence in the home.

== Deaths ==
Both parents died violently not longer after building their Australian-style home at Port Hedland.

The full circumstances of Dost's death in 1909 are unclear. It is known that Dost was killed at home during a long fight with his two brothers-in-law. One of them fatally smashed open the back of Dost's skull with a heavy piece of jarrah. The two brothers stood trial in Broome in June 1909, but were acquitted of murder. Dost's relatives attributed his death to Annie's brothers, and held Annie at least partially responsible for their acquittal.

Dost was a man of wealth and standing when he died. He had left a written will bequeathing his assets to his children and Annie, designating his brother Jorak as executor. Annie left written accounts that Jorak was withholding money from her and that life was very difficult. She finally agreed to Jorak's offer of financial security and a good education for the children on condition that she return to India with the children, which she did in about May 1910.

In Karachi, Annie took precautions, establishing contact with the British Resident in the town. She was well-remembered by many of Dost's relatives around Karachi, and worked alongside women in the village. Warned by some of them of threats to her life, she and the children moved to a compound the other side of Karachi, gaining the protection of a trusted relative. She slept with a small revolver under her pillow and a watchdog outside.

Three months after arriving in India, in August 1910, Annie was stabbed to death in her bed while her two youngest children lay alongside. Two nephews (Jorak's sons) and a third brother were charged with murder, but were acquitted because of lack of identification.

After the trial, the five youngest children were returned to Australia under an agreement between the district magistrate at Karachi and the Federal and Western Australian Governments, and eventually placed in the care of the State. After their deaths, accounts of their parents' assets included camels, property in Port Hedland, monies owing to the estates, and jewellery, but the children did not inherit any of this.

== Legacy ==
With the exception of 15 hours of taped interviews by the Battye Library in Perth, very little account of their early lives was passed on by the Australian-born children. In sharp contrast, many stories about Dost and Annie have been handed down among the relatives around Karachi.

A great-great-great-grandson named Jacob Mahomet attended the 150th anniversary celebration for Burke and Wills in 2015.

The tamarind tree that still grows in Port Hedland at the site known as One Mile is reputed to have been planted by Dost Mahomet.

== See also ==
- Australian Baloch
- Islam in Australia
- The Furnace (2020 film)
