= Joiyya =

Main tribe of Bhagnari

The Joiyya or Joiyea is the main tribe of Bhagnari Baloch living in India. This community speaks Hindi language. This community uses Khan surname. Some of their tribe's people succeeded in migrating from India to Central Punjab of Pakistan. These Immigrants are still living near Bhagnari, Stgarha Okara, Depalpur, Vehari, Lahore, Pakpattan, Jhang, Kasur and Sahiwal. These Joiyyas are called Yodha.

== History ==
Joiyya Bhagnari tribe's people were settled in Kacchi East of Balochistan and due to cold weather and partition they migrated to India. Meer Sohnpal Khan Joiyya was the early chief of this tribe and left his three sons. Lonaar Khan, Burak Khan and Wasih Khan. Lonaar Khan was a great warrior and he ruled in Rajasthan for more than four decades. He had 9 sons, and he accepted Islam from Baba Farid of Pakpattan and his eldest son Lal Khan become chief of this tribe after him and he conquered many nearby areas of Pakpattan. After being defeated by Bhatti and Rao Rajputs they were compelled to migrate. So they came near to Multan. At that time Farooq Ali Khan Joiya was the tribe leader and he was also a great warrior who ruled in Multan and Vehari, fought against Sher Shah Suri on behalf of Mughal King Hamayon sent by Mir Chakar Khan Rind and defeated his forces. Joiyya Living in Pakistan are the descendants of Farooq Ali Khan who originally belonged from Bhagnari Hindu community.This is a tribe of Indian Balochs who then migrated from Northern India to Balochistan and later towards Punjab of Pakistan.

=== Origin ===
During Arabs conquests of Iran in Era of Caliph Hazrat Umer R.A and during Era of Caliph Hazrat Ali R.A their forces conquered Iran and today's modern Balochistan parts. At that time many tribes were converted to Islam including many nomadic tribes.

According to Joiyya tribe's people, this race is continued from camel keeping nomadic tribes of Iran. Allahyar chief of this tribe named Joh used to live in Baghdad. During the attack of Halagu Khan, he migrated from Baghdad to Balochistan but due to extreme cold weather he spent only a few years in Balochistan.

The Joiya tribesmen are descendants of Joh Iranian nomadic tribe. According to another reference, Elyas Khan was a saint in Baghdad and his son was Joiyya Khan. He was a great warrior and their tribe was named after him.

According to another reference the Joiyya Tribe migrated from Balochistan to Indian northern parts where they lived for more than 4 decades.
