= Khans of Sahiwal =

- 1528–1811
- Capital: Sahiwal
- Government
  - Type: Monarchy
- History
  - Established: 1528
  - Disestablished: 1811
- Today part of: Pakistan

The Sahiwal Khans were a Balochfamily who arrived in India in 1527. Malik Bajar Khan was a minor chieftain in Kech Makran, the westernmost province of Balochistan. The descendants of Bajar Khan, who had a strong Mughal alliance, spread their principality throughout northern India, and strongly opposed the Sikh and British Empire.

== History ==
Malik Bajjar Khan was given zamindari rights over the Thal territory about Shahpur by Babur. He settled near Khushab. His son and successor Gul Bhalak Khan obtained from Humayun the territory around Sahiwal. His successors served the Mughal government one after the other. In 1530, he Bajjar Khan died and was succeeded by his son Gul Bhalak Khan, who founded several new villages in the Shahpur region and defeated the Khatk tribes with a great massacre in the place named after the battle, Haddanwala (Haddi bone) from a huge number of those killed, whose bones whitewashed the plain for a long time. The village is now known as Khadali . He received from the Emperor a piece of land around Sahiwal, which he settled and introduced into culture. He died in 1547.

- Hot Khan. Little is known about this man or about his two closest successors, Mubarak Khan and Budha Khan.
- Sahib Khan, the sixth leader of the Sahiwal, was a man of such cruel and oppressive mood that people rebelled against his power and, having overthrown him, made his nephew Langar Khan ruler.
- Langar Khan was frivolous and greatly improved his territory, paying great attention to agriculture. Fearing that his four sons (Lal Khan, Mubarak Khan, Bayram Khan and Lashkar Khan) from different wives might quarrel, he built a separate fort for each in the vicinity of Sahiwal, one of which stood in the days of British India. This remarkable method of ensuring peace was not crowned with success, and after the death of Langar Khan in 1735, his sons began to quarrel with each other.
- Lal Khan, the elder, held on to his rights and killed his brother Bayram Khan. Lashkar Khan and his nephew Kanun Khan felt safe. When Ahmad Shah Durani first invaded India, Lal Khan gave him every assistance in delivering supplies. Prince Durrani treated him with such respect that Mubarak Khan, his only remaining brother, became jealous of his fame and, having entered into an agreement with Fath Khan from Bukharianwal, sent great forces against him. In the battle that followed, Lal Khan was defeated and killed.
- Fatah Khan was only twelve years old when he succeeded his father. He was an intelligent boy and soon avenged his father's death by forcing Mubarak Khan and his family to take refuge in Bahawalpur. Fatah Khan's reign was short-lived. He was taken prisoner during the Afghans invasion, taken to Dera Ismail Khan and executed there. He had no son left, and his two brothers were so young that their mother Bhandi took over the management.
- Bhandi had courage and ability, and the Baloch clans obeyed her, and her only fault was that she was a woman. In 1750, Raja Kura Mai, lieutenant of Ahmad Shah Durrani, arrived in Sahiwal and summoned the little leaders to him. Bhandi suspected betrayal and, refusing to obey, called the troops to arms and attacked Raja, but was completely defeated. The children were taken prisoner and, it is believed, executed.
- Mubarak Khan now thought his turn was come, and, returning from Bahawalpur, assumed the chiefship without much opposition, and held it till his death, in 1770.
- His son Muhammad Khan found it difficult to make head against the Sikhs who were at this time overrunning the country. Sirdar Jhanda Singh Bhangi attacked Sahiwal but was repulsed though he took possession of a portion of the territory. Muhammad Khan at length succeeded in recovering this with some loss, but was assassinated soon afterwards by some Sikhs and Baloches, who had come to Sahiwal on pretence of paying him a complimentary visit.
- Allah-yar Khan having punished his father's (Muhammad Khan) murderers turned his attention to the improvement of the country, and was engaged in cutting a canal from the Jhelam, when he was killed by a fall from his horse.
- Fatah Khan Baloch the fourteenth chief was a minor at the time of his brother's death, and for some time his mother Allah Jowahi acted as regent, in conjunction with Diwan Dya Ram. When the boy grew up he determined to seize the power which his mother and the Diwan seemed to wish to retain, and his bold policy was completely successful. He then turned his arms against the Sikhs and recovered from them the forts of Nihang and Shaikh Jalil. From Mit Singh Bhangi he took Derah Jarah, and soon became dreaded for his energy and courage. On all sides he recovered ancestral possessions and acquired new ones, till he at length ruled over a larger tract of country than any of his predecessors, and his revenue amounted to about 1,50,000 Rs. When Mahan Singh rose to power Fatah Khan thought it politic to pay him a small tribute; and in 1804 he agreed to give Ranjit Singh yearly, 25 horses and 25 camels. This tribute was, in 1809, commuted to 12,000 Rs. per annum.

== See also ==
- Mir Chakar Rind
