= Banadi Shehak =

16th-century female warrior from modern-day Pakistan

Mirzadi Banadi Shehak میرزادی بنادی شہک
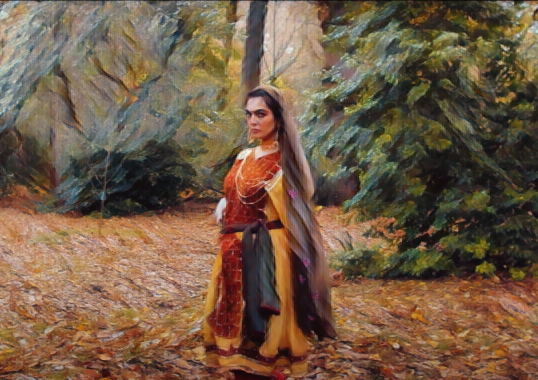
- Reign: Nobility of Baloch, Rind tribe
- Residence: Balochistan
- Wars and battles: Battle of Chausa
- Family: Rind tribe
- Father: Mir Shehak
- Occupation: Nobility and Warrior

Banadi Shehak (Balochi:بنادی شہک) was a noblewoman and female warrior of the 16th century from modern-day Balochistan. She was Mirzadi (Princess) of Rind tribe and sister of Mir Chakar Rind.

She participated in the battle of Chausa, which was a battle between Mughals and Afghans in which Rind tribe was supporting Mughals. After a fierce battle, Mughals and Rind tribe started retreating from the battlefield; seeing this, Shehak broke her bangles by hitting her arms with her knees and came into the battlefield herself with a sword in her hand. She killed many men, until she came in direct combat with Afghan general Sher Shah Suri. He told her, "you, being a women, keep aside from my way", to which Shehak replied, "You might think that women are the ones who sit at homes, are busy in adornment and in engaging their husbands, but it is not so!".

Rind tribal forces, seeing their Mirzadi (Princess) fighting in the battlefield, stopped retreating and charged once again on the enemy killing 30,000 enemy troops. However, Mughals and Rind tribe ultimately lost the battle. Banadi Shehak died on the same battlefield.
