= List of diaspora football clubs in Sweden =

The following is a list of diaspora football teams in Sweden. The Swedish football league system currently has ten levels, with the first five being governed by the Swedish Football Association. The sixth to tenth levels are controlled by regional associations. Only three diaspora football clubs have participated in Allsvenskan and Superettan, the highest and second highest football league in Sweden. Assyriska FF participated in Allsvenskan 2005, Syrianska FC in 2011, 2012 and 2013, and Dalkurd FF in 2018. Assyriska FF was the first diaspora football club to reach the second highest division, the highest division and the only one yet to reach a Svenska Cupen final, in 2003.

| Team | City | Established by | Division Name | Level |
|---|---|---|---|---|
| Akropolis IF | Sundbyberg, Stockholm | Greeks | Superettan | 2 |
| Dalkurd FF | Uppsala | Kurds | Superettan | 2 |
| Assyriska IK | Jönköping | Assyrian-Syriacs | Ettan Södra | 3 |
| Örebro Syrianska IF | Örebro | Assyrian-Syriacs | Ettan Norra | 3 |
| Arameisk-Syrianska IF | Botkyrka, Stockholm | Assyrian-Syriacs | Division 2 Södra Svealand | 4 |
| Assyriska BK | Gothenburg | Assyrian-Syriacs | Division 2 Västra Götaland | 4 |
| Assyriska FF | Södertälje, Stockholm | Assyrian-Syriacs | Division 2 Södra Svealand | 4 |
| Assyriska IF Norrköping | Norrköping | Assyrian-Syriacs | Division 2 Södra Svealand | 4 |
| Newroz FC | Bredäng, Stockholm | Kurds | Division 2 Södra Svealand | 4 |
| KSF Prespa Birlik | Malmö | Macedonian Turks | Division 2 Västra Götaland | 4 |
| Syrianska FC | Södertälje, Stockholm | Assyrian-Syriacs | Division 2 Östra Götaland | 4 |
| FBK Balkan | Malmö | Yugoslavians | Division 3 Södra Götaland | 5 |
| Syrianska Eskilstuna IF | Eskilstuna | Assyrian-Syriacs | Division 3 Södra Svealand | 5 |
| Syrianska IF Kerburan | Västerås | Assyrian-Syriacs | Division 3 Norra Svealand | 5 |
| Uppsala-Kurd FK | Uppsala | Kurds | Division 3 Norra Svealand | 5 |
| Afrikansk FC | Södertälje, Stockholm | Africans | Division 4 Södermanland | 6 |
| Ariana FC | Malmö | Afghans | Division 4 Skåne Sydvästra | 6 |
| Azech SF | Norrköping | Assyrian-Syriacs | Division 4 Östergötland Östra | 6 |
| FK Besa | Landskrona | Albanians | Division 4 Skåne Nordvästra | 6 |
| Bollnäs Kurd IF | Bollnäs | Kurds | Division 4 Hälsingland | 6 |
| FK Bosna 08 | Solna, Stockholm | Bosnians | Division 4 Stockholm Norra | 6 |
| FK Bosna 92 | Örebro | Bosnians | Division 4 Örebro | 6 |
| Cosmos | Östersund | Darfurians | Division 4 Jämtland/Härjedalen | 6 |
| IK Derik | Norrköping | Assyrian-Syriacs | Division 4 Östergötland Östra | 6 |
| Konyaspor KIF | Alby, Stockholm | Turks | Division 4 Stockholm Södra | 6 |
| KSF Kosova IF | Malmö | Kosovo Albanians | Division 4 Skåne Sydvästra | 6 |
| FC Nacka Illiria | Stockholm | Albanians | Division 4 Stockholm Södra | 6 |
| Norrköpings IF Bosna | Norrköping | Bosnians | Division 4 Östergötland Östra | 6 |
| SKIF Semberija | Gothenburg | Serbs | Division 4 Göteborg A | 6 |
| Somalia United FF | Kista, Stockholm | Somalis | Division 4 Stockholm Norra | 6 |
| Swesom FC | Borlänge | Somalis | Division 4 Dalarna | 6 |
| KF Velebit | Gothenburg | Croatians | Division 4 Göteborg B | 6 |
| IK Apollon | Uppsala | Greeks | Division 5 Uppland Södra | 7 |
| Apollon Solna FK | Solna, Stockholm | Greeks | Division 5 Stockholm Norra | 7 |
| Banjul FC | Stockholm | Gambians | Division 5 Stockholm Norra | 7 |
| Bosna IF | Gislaved | Bosnians | Division 5 Småland Sydvästra | 7 |
| Bosnien Hercegovinas SK | Malmö | Bosnians | Division 5 Skåne Sydvästra | 7 |
| Bosnisk SK | Västerås | Bosnians | Division 5 Västmanland | 7 |
| FC Bosona-Bosna IF | Gothenburg | Bosnians | Division 5 Göteborg A | 7 |
| Chile Unido IF | Norrköping | Chileans | Division 5 Östergötland Östra | 7 |
| Croatia Helsingborg KIF | Helsingborg | Croatians | Division 5 Skåne Nordvästra | 7 |
| NK Croatia | Malmö | Croatians | Division 5 Skåne Sydvästra | 7 |
| FC Dardania | Värnamo | Albanians | Division 5 Småland Sydvästra | 7 |
| Edessa Syrianska KIF | Stockholm | Assyrian-Syriacs | Division 5 Stockholm Norra | 7 |
| Finlandia/Pallo AIF | Gothenburg | Finns | Division 5 Göteborg A | 7 |
| Medina IF | Helsingborg | Arabs | Division 5 Skåne Nordvästra | 7 |
| Multikulturell IK | Ludvika | Various | Division 5 Dalarna | 7 |
| Olympiacos FC | Spånga, Stockholm | Greeks | Division 5 Stockholm Norra | 7 |
| Parsian IF | Stockholm | Iranians | Division 5 Stockholm Norra | 7 |
| FC Plavi Team | Solna, Stockholm | Yugoslavians | Division 5 Stockholm Norra | 7 |
| Rinia IF | Falkenberg | Albanians | Division 5 Halland | 7 |
| Palestinska FF | Uppsala | Palestinians | Division 5 Uppland Norra | 7 |
| Svensk Palestinska FF | Stockholm | Palestinians | Division 5 Stockholm Södra | 7 |
| Syrianska FF | Enköping | Assyrian-Syriacs | Division 5 Uppland Södra | 7 |
| Syrianska IF | Norrköping | Assyrian-Syriacs | Division 5 Östergötland Östra | 7 |
| Trollhättan Syrianska FK | Trollhättan | Assyrian-Syriacs | Division 5 Västergötland Västra | 7 |
| IF Vardar/Makedonija | Gothenburg | Macedonians | Division 5 Göteborg A | 7 |
| United Africa FC | Gothenburg | Nigerians | Division 5 Göteborg A | 7 |
| Al Salam SK | Eskilstuna | Arabs | Division 6 Södermanland Nordvästra | 8 |
| Armeniska United FK | Uppsala | Armenians | Division 6 Uppland Södra | 8 |
| Babylon FK | Västerås | Arabs | Division 6 Västmanland | 8 |
| Camdja IKF | Stockholm | Latin Americans | Division 6 Stockholm F | 8 |
| Croatia Göteborg | Gothenburg | Croatians | Division 6 Göteborg A | 8 |
| Dardania IF | Borås | Albanians | Division 6 Borås | 8 |
| Dulqad IK | Linköping | Somalis | Division 6 Östergötland Mellersta | 8 |
| FK Ekipa | Stockholm | Yugoslavians | Division 6 Stockholm E | 8 |
| Eskilstuna Babylon IF | Eskilstuna | Assyrian-Syriacs | Division 6 Södermanland Nordvästra | 8 |
| Ezid SK | Borlänge | Various | Division 6 Dalarna Södra | 8 |
| Förenad Turkisk Ungdom | Gothenburg | Turks | Division 6 Göteborg B | 8 |
| Iberoamericana IF | Stockholm | Latin Americans | Division 6 Stockholm B | 8 |
| IK Makkabi | Stockholm | Jews in Sweden | Division 6 Stockholm B | 8 |
| Kroatiska KF Tomislavi | Borås | Croatians | Division 6 Borås | 8 |
| Kurd Ämhult FF | Älmhult | Kurds | Division 6 Älmhult | 8 |
| Kurdiska FF Örebro | Örebro | Kurds | Division 6 Örebro | 8 |
| FC Kurdtuna | Eskilstuna | Kurds | Division 6 Södermanland Nordvästra | 8 |
| Liria IF | Malmö | Albanians | Division 6 Skåne Sydvästra A | 8 |
| Mjölby Turabdin FC | Mjölby | Assyrian-Syriacs | Division 6 Östergötland Västra | 8 |
| Märsta Syrianska FC | Märsta, Stockholm | Assyrian-Syriacs | Division 6 Uppland Södra | 8 |
| Persien FC | Uppsala | Iranians | Division 6 Uppland Södra | 8 |
| MF Pelister | Trelleborg | Macedonians | Division 6 Skåne Södra | 8 |
| Polonia Falcons FF | Stockholm | Poles | Division 6 Stockholm B | 8 |
| Qaran IKF | Spånga, Stockholm | Arabs | Division 6 Stockholm B | 8 |
| Saba Palestina KIF | Malmö | Palestinians | Division 6 Skåne Sydvästra B | 8 |
| Somali FF | Kinna | Somalis | Division 6 Borås | 8 |
| FC Somtuna | Eskilstuna | Somalis | Division 6 Södermanland Nordvästra | 8 |
| Stockholms IF Midia | Stockholm | Kurds | Division 6 Stockholm B | 8 |
| Syrianska/Arameiska Föreningen | Gothenburg | Assyrian-Syriacs | Division 6 Göteborg A | 8 |
| Tunisiska FC | Stockholm | Tunisians | Division 6 Stockholm E | 8 |
| Turkisk Center FF | Malmö | Turks | Division 6 Skåne Sydvästra A | 8 |
| Uruguayanska FF | Stockholm | Uruguayans | Division 6 Stockholm E | 8 |
| FF Vuk | Malmö | Serbs | Division 6 Skåne Sydvästra B | 8 |
| Västkurd BK | Gothenburg | Kurds | Division 6 Göteborg B | 8 |
| Yezidiska Ideella FK | Norrköping | Yazidis | Division 6 Östergötland Östra | 8 |
| IF Zmajevi | Västerås | Bosnians | Division 6 Västmanland | 8 |
| Örnar FK Landskrona | Landskrona | Romanians | Division 6 Skåne Nordvästra B | 8 |
| Afghanska FF | Stockholm | Afghans | Division 7 Stockholm A | 9 |
| FC Baloch | Stockholm | Baloch | Division 7 Stockholm A | 9 |
| Dardania Stockholm FF | Stockholm | Albanians | Division 7 Stockholm H | 9 |
| Gambian Mix IF | Gothenburg | Gambians | Division 7 Göteborg A | 9 |
| Gothenburg Celtic FC | Gothenburg | Scots | Division 7 Göteborg A | 9 |
| Marockanska FC | Stockholm | Moroccans | Division 7 Stockholm H | 9 |
| Newroz FC Bredäng | Halmstad | Kurds | Division 7 Stockholm H | 9 |
| FC Somtuna U | Eskilstuna | Somalis | Division 7 Södermanland Nordöstra | 9 |
| Swesom FC U | Borlänge | Somalis | Division 7 Dalarna Södra | 9 |
| Viña Del Mar IF | Stockholm | Chileans | Division 7 Stockholm F | 9 |
| FC Zalin Suryoye | Gothenburg | Assyrian-Syriacs | Division 7 Göteborg B | 9 |
| Aroskurd IF | Västerås | Kurds | Division 8 Västmanland | 10 |
| Hornafrik Ungdomsförening IF | Västerås | Somalis | Division 8 Västmanland | 10 |

Notable defunct teams

- SK Hakoah from Malmö existed between 1932–2013 and was the first diaspora football club in Sweden, founded by Jewish immigrants.
- Juventus IF was established by Italians in 1948 and reached as high as the fifth tier. They merged with IFK Stocksund in 2016.
- Topkapi IK existed between 1978 and 2006, established by Turkish immigrants, and reached as high as the third tier.
- Valsta Syrianska IK, from Märsta, Stockholm, was established by Assyrian-Syriacs, existed between 1993–2015 and reached as high as the third tier.
- Växjö United FC, from Växjö, was established by Somalis, existed between 2011–2019 and reached as high as the sixth tier, until they were expelled as a member of the Swedish Football Association, due to financial reasons, false player identities and allegations of match fixing.
