= Baloch Council of North America =

Political advocacy group in the United States

- Formation: 2004
- Headquarters: 1629 K Street NW, Suite 300; Washington D.C., USA; 20036
- Leader: Wahid Baloch

Baloch Council of North America (BCNA) is a advocacy organization in the United States that seeks to "unite all Baloch people and secure Baloch rights, including the right of self-determination, within the Pakistani Federation".

== History ==
BCNA was originally founded as BSO-NA or Baloch Society of North America in 2004 by Dr. Wahid Baloch in Washington D.C.. Dr. Wahid Baloch graduated from Bolan Medical College in Quetta in 1990 and in 1992, he immigrated to the United States. Dr. Baloch had long claimed that the Pakistani state was committing acts of genocide against the Baloch people, and that the government's aim was to plunder the province's vast mineral resources. In January 2014 he released a letter appealing to the United States and Israel for direct assistance in preventing an alleged "killing spree" of Baloch people by what he called the "law enforcement agencies of Pakistan".

=== Disbandment and reorganization ===
Dr. Baloch disbanded and reconstituted his organization in 2014 with a newfound emphasis on human rights advocacy. Dr. Baloch disbanded the BSO-NA, saying that the war of independence for Balochistan was actually a "war of independence of Khans, Nawabs and Sardars". He reconstituted the group as the Baloch Council of North America (BCN), dedicated to working with all democratic and nationalist forces in Pakistan to secure Baloch rights through democratic, nonviolent means, within the federation of Pakistan.
