= Baloch people in Punjab =

Punjabis of Baloch descent

Baloch of Punjab
Total population
- ~ 6 million (1997 estimations)

Regions with significant populations
- Punjab, Pakistan

Languages
- Balochi • Saraiki • Punjabi • Urdu

Religion
- Islam

Related ethnic groups
- Baloch • Baloch diaspora • Sindhi Baloch • Baloch of India

The Baloch people in Punjab (Note: Punjabi: پنجاب وچ بلوچ لوک; Urdu: پنجاب میں بلوچ لوگ) are the residents of partial or full Baloch ancestry in Punjab, Pakistan, most of whom have assimilated in Punjab and speak Saraiki, Standard Punjabi, Urdu and various other languages. The majority lives in the southwest of Punjab, including Dera Ghazi Khan, Rajanpur and Taunsa, which adjoin the Balochistan.

== History ==
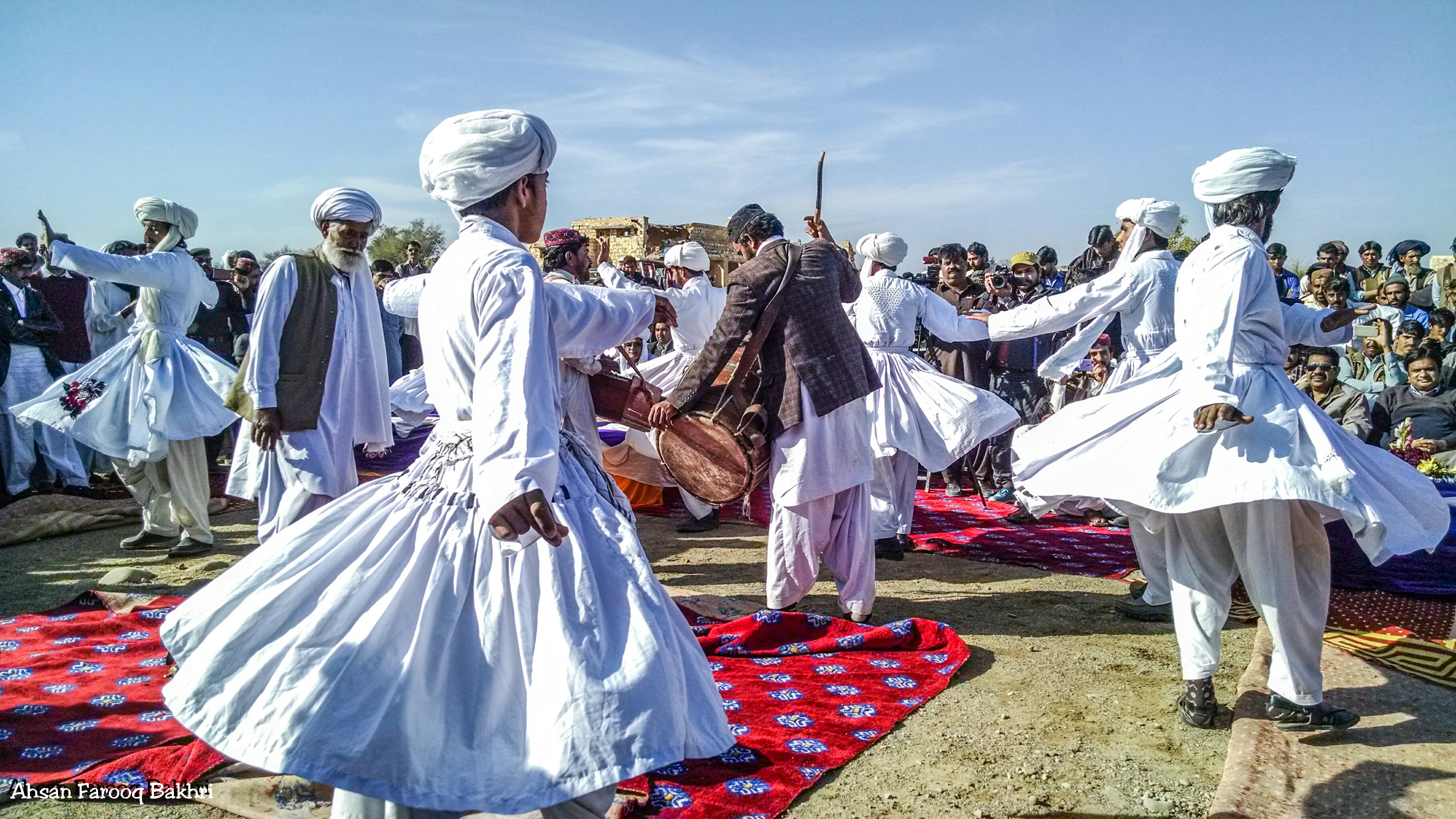
Traditional dance of Baloch tribes (locally known as Sulaimani Chap)

The first Baloch migrations into Punjab occurred in the 15th-century on the invitation of Shah Hussain I of Langah Sultanate. The Dodai tribe under Ghazi Khan was settled by Shah Hussain in the Derajat region between Indus River and Sulaiman Range. In the next century, another Baloch chief Mir Chakar migrated with a large number of followers to Satghara near Okara where he was granted jagir by the Mughals. Baloch nomads continued to move to the Punjab plains in the following centuries, settling as far as the Thal Desert in the Sind Sagar Doab.

According to Dr. Akhtar Baloch, Professor at University of Karachi, the Baloch migrated from Balochistan during the Little Ice Age and settled in Sindh and Punjab. According to Professor Baloch, the climate of Balochistan was very cold during this epoch and the region was inhabitable during the winter so the Baloch people migrated in waves to the fertile Indus valley.

== Demographics ==
In his book Searchlights on Baloches and Balochistan (1997), Justice Mir Khuda Bakhsh Marri estimated the Baloch population in Punjab to be around 6 million, most of them not speaking Balochi anymore, but Punjabi and Saraiki; Marri concentrated on the statistics given by the British colonialists in British Punjab during their research, such as the Punjab Census Report of 1931, extrapolating the numbers by looking at the natural growth of Pakistan's overall population.

== See also ==
- Mirani dynasty
- Khans of Sahiwal
- Kashmiris in Punjab
- Pathans of Punjab
