= Bhagnari =

Hindu community in India

Bhag Nari

Regions with significant populations

Languages
- Sindhi, Balochi

Religion
- Islam, Hinduism

Related ethnic groups
- Hindu, Baloch

Bhagnari is a historical town of Balochistan in Kachhi district in Balochistan.

The Aeri tribe is one of the oldest tribes of Kachhi. They lived in this region for many centuries and were known as the biggest landowners of Bhagnari. The tribe was respected for its influence, strength, and control over the area. Because of their leadership and responsibility, they were given the honorable title “Arbab,” which showed their authority among the people. The Aeri tribe was also famous for being brave and warrior-minded. They protected their land with courage and always stood strong in difficult times. Their bravery and power made them one of the most respected tribes in Kachhi and Bhagnari.

== See also ==
- Hinduism in Balochistan
