= Baloch people in Sindh =

Community of Sindhi-speaking Baloch tribes

Sindhi Baloch
Total population
- ~ 4 million (1981 census)

Regions with significant populations
- Sindh Province

Languages
- Sindhi; Balochi; Urdu

Religion
- Islam

Related ethnic groups
- Baloch • Baloch diaspora • Baloch of Punjab

The Baloch of Sindh, also known as Sindhi Baloch (Sindhi: سنڌي ٻروچ, Balochi: سندی بلۏچ), are assimilated Sindhis of Baloch descent, living throughout the Pakistani province of Sindh. They speak the Sindhi language and retain their tribal links to the Baloch tribes.

Settling in the region for centuries, Baloch tribes own large agricultural land and related businesses in Sindh, a large part of them being landlords in Sindh.

== Talpur dynasty ==
The Talpurs were a Sindhi-speaking Baluch tribe, and were descendants of Mir Sulaiman Kako Talpur, who had arrived in Sindh from Choti Bala in southern Punjab.

They were Shia Muslims by faith. They ruled from 1783 until 1843, when they were defeated by the British at the Battle of Miani and Battle of Dubbo. The northern Khairpur branch of the Talpur dynasty however, continued to maintain a degree of sovereignty during British rule as the princely state of Khairpur.

Its ruler joined the new Dominion of Pakistan in October 1947 as an autonomous region in Pakistan.

== History ==
The Baloch holds a significant place in the history of Sindh. The Talpurs, originally a Baloch tribe, ruled Sindh from 1783 to 1843. A significant population in sindh have Baloch root about 4 million.

It is believed that the Balochs migrated from Balochistan during the Little Ice Age. The Little Ice Age is conventionally defined as a period extending from the sixteenth to the nineteenth centuries, or alternatively, from about 1300 to about 1850. Although climatologists and historians working with local records no longer expect to agree on either the start or end dates of this period, which varied according to local conditions.

According to Dr Akhtar Baloch of the University of Karachi, the climate of Balochistan was very cold and the region was uninhabitable during the winter so the Baloch people migrated in waves and settled in Sindh and Punjab.

== Language ==
Balochs of Sindh mostly migrated from Balochistan to Sindh from 16th to 19th century. Majority of Balochs in Sindh historically speak Sindhi as their mother tongue, While a significant amount of them spoke "Balochki" which was the term used interchangeably for Siraiki dialect by Sindhis.

== Demographics ==
At the time of the 1981 census, the ethnic Baloch population was estimated by Selig Harrison to number 4 million out of Sindh's total population of 18 million, many if not most of these Baloch having assimilated, thus not speaking Balochi anymore but Sindhi.

== See also ==
- Baloch people in Punjab
- Baloch people in India
