= Baloch people in India =

People of Baloch origin settled in India

بلۏچ مردم ہندوستان تہا

Regions with significant populations
- Gujarat; Rajasthan; Uttar Pradesh; Maharashtra; Delhi; Telangana; Andhra Pradesh; West Bengal; Karnataka; Punjab; Bihar; Jharkhand

Languages
- Urdu-Hindi; Balochi

Religion
- Islam; Hinduism (minority)

Baloch people in India are citizens or residents of India who are of Baloch ancestry. They originate from the Balochistan region of neighbouring Pakistan, and are part of the Baloch diaspora.

== History ==
Even after the partition, it was common for the Baloch from India to visit their extended families in Pakistan, mainly in Karachi. In recent decades, this became difficult due to tightened visa restrictions.

== Demographics ==
There are around 300 Baloch families living in Mumbai, numbering about 1,500 individuals. They are scattered across the outer western suburbs and ghettos of Mumbai's metropolitan area. The vast majority of them belong to a working class background, having little formal education, and are employed as manual labourers or drivers. There is a distinct community Jamnagar Baloch in Kenya which was led by Sarfraz Hassan Khan.

The Bhagnari are Hindu Baloch community living in India, who trace their origin to the Southern Balochistan but migrated to India during the Partition.

== Culture ==
Some Baloch in India have held onto their cultural practices and traditions, including their clothing, music, and their native language Balochi. The women wear a traditional dress known as pashk, an elaborate, handwoven two-piece costume which resembles a kurta-pyjama. Balochi folk music is known for its incorporation of drums and beats.

== Entertainment industry ==
There are many Indian actors from the Hindi film industry Bollywood, who although not Baloch by ethnicity, have origins in the Baluchistan Province of British India (now Pakistan). They include the actress Veena Kumari, born in Quetta; Raaj Kumar, a Kashmiri Pandit born in Loralai; Suresh Oberoi, a Punjabi Hindu born in Quetta; and Kader Khan, an ethnic Pathan born in Pishin. According to some sources, the Pathan actor Amjad Khan was also born in Quetta, however his place of birth is recorded as Peshawar.

In the Hindi film industry, the Baloch are particularly well known as professional stunt performers and drivers who are hired to choreograph dangerous action sequences. One such performer, Wahid Lala, was the first stuntman from this community who started his career in Bollywood in 1951, working in seven Bimal Roy and nine Jugal Kishore film productions, including as a stunt double for actor Pran. His sons and grandsons have collectively worked in around 300 Hindi, Gujarati, Marathi, Bengali, Telugu and Kannada films.

Mehul Kumar, real name Mohammed Ibrahim Baloch, a well known director of Hindi and Gujarati films is of Makrani Baloch origin (part of the Baloch people in Gujarat) from Jamnagar, Gujarat. Ashfaq Makrani, of similar origin, is a film editor and also directed the 2012 film Qasam Se Qasam Se.

Faiz Baloch, a social media celebrity, is one of the prominent TikTok and Instagram influencers in India, having amassed a following of over 9.4 million and 2.8 million respectively on the two platforms, as of July 2019.

== See also ==
- Pathans in India
- Sindhis in India
- Hinduism in Balochistan
