= Baloch diaspora =

Ethnic Baloch people who have emigrated outside of their homeland

درملکی بلۏچ

Languages
- Balochi, Brahvi, Scandinavian languages, Urdu, Hindi, Persian, English

Religion
- Predominately Islam

The Baloch diaspora (Note: Balochi: درملکی بلۏچ, romanized: Darmolki Baloč) refers to Baloch people, and their descendants, who have immigrated to places outside the Balochistan region. The Baloch diaspora is found throughout West Asia, South Asia, Turkmenistan, East Africa, Europe, North America, and elsewhere.

== Pakistan ==
Within Pakistan, there are significant numbers of Baloch tribes that have migrated partially or totally and settled in regions outside of Balochistan, mostly into Sindh. Some have also migrated into Southern Punjab, especially in the Saraiki speaking regions as well as southeast Khyber Pakhtunkhwa.

Many have become entirely assimilated into their host cultures. The Zardari tribe Jatoi tribe and Chandio and Magsi tribes for example are now culturally Sindhi Baloch. The Talpur dynasty is a Baloch tribe that ruled over Sindh. Meanwhile, the Legharis of Sindh and Southern Punjab speak both Sindhi and Saraiki.

== Worldwide populations ==
=== Middle East ===
There are large numbers of Baloch living in Oman, the United Arab Emirates (UAE) and other Arab states of the Persian Gulf. Around 20% of Oman's native population is of Baloch descent; with an additional 15% expatriate population, the figure rises to 35%.

=== Europe ===
There are also significant populations in Norway, Sweden, and other European countries.

=== Turkmenistan ===
There is a population of Baloch in Turkmenistan who migrated there in the early 20th century, estimated in 1997 to number between 38,000 and 40,000.

=== East Africa ===
There is also a small but historic Baloch community in East Africa, left over from when the Sultanate of Muscat ruled over Zanzibar and the Swahili Coast. These migrants were largely from Makran and southern Balochistan.

=== India ===
There are also a number of settlements of Baloch in India, mainly in Uttar Pradesh and Gujarat. They now speak either Balochi, Hindi-Urdu, Gujarati, and Kutchi, depending on their location.

=== North America ===
Smaller but sizeable Baloch communities are found throughout various states in the United States and Canada. Baloch immigrants in North America have formed their own cultural associations and tend to keep the community active through social events.

== See also ==
- Baloch people
  - Baloch in India
  - Baloch in Punjab
  - Baloch in Sindh
  - Baloch Americans
