= Baloch people =

Ethnolinguistic group native to South Asia and Iran

Baloch
بلۏچ
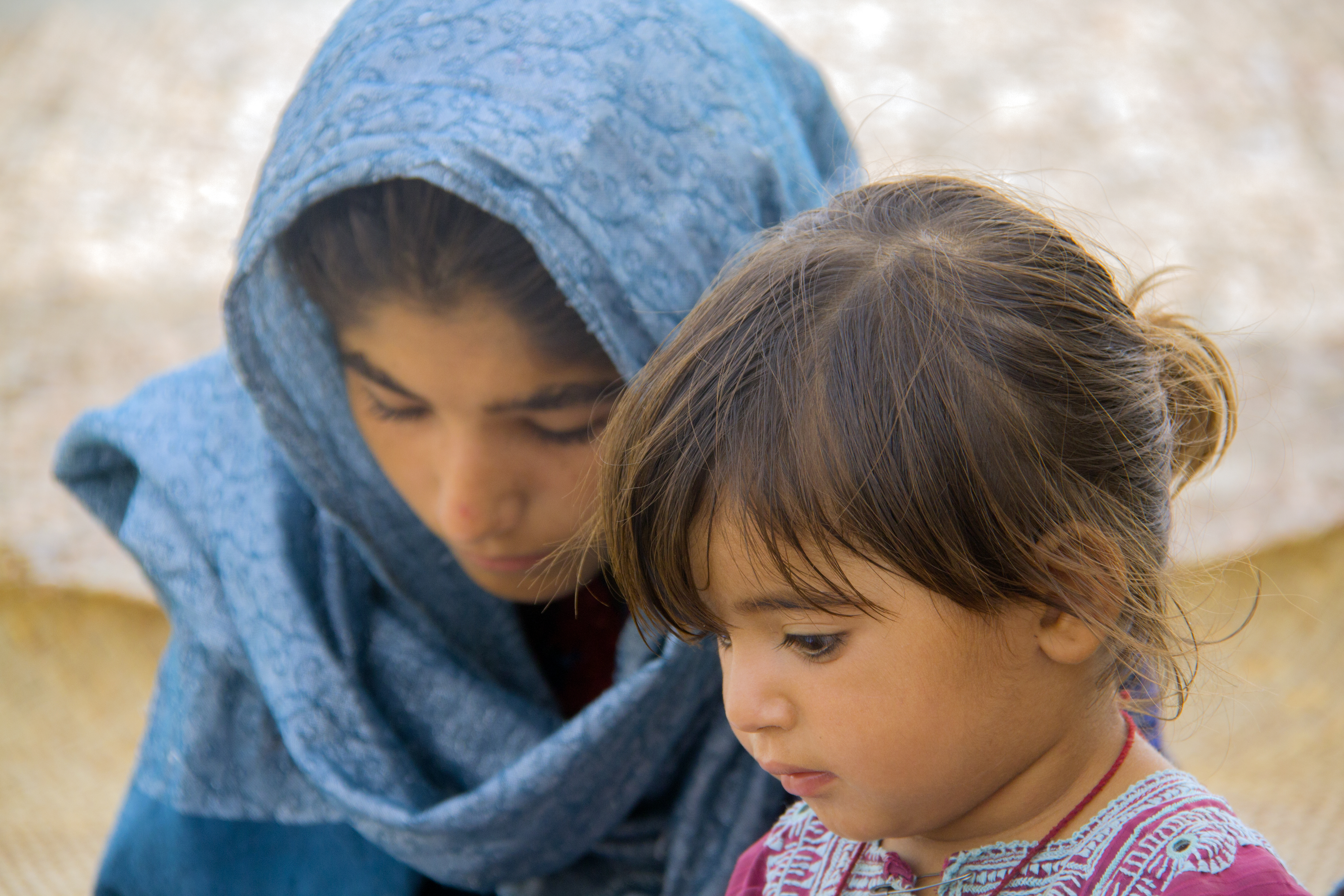
- Baloch people

Total population
- c. 15 million

Regions with significant populations
- Pakistan: 8,117,795 (2023 census) (Note: Only includes those who speak Balochi as mother tongue)
- Iran: 4,800,000
- Oman: 1,000,000
- Afghanistan: 300,000–500,000
- United Arab Emirates: 383,000
- India: 64,000
- Qatar: 53,000
- Bahrain: 44,000
- Turkmenistan: 36,000
- Kuwait: 20,000
- Saudi Arabia: 12,000
- Somalia: 12,000

Languages
- Balochi, Brahui, various other languages of host regions spoken by splinter groups Other languages: Persian (in Iran and Afghanistan), Urdu (in Pakistan), Pashto (in Afghanistan), English

Religion
- Predominantly Islam (mainly Sunni Islam)(99%) Minority:Hinduism(<0.1%)

Related ethnic groups
- Iranian peoples

The Baloch people (Note: US: /bəˈloʊtʃ/ bə-LOHCH; Balochi: بلۏچ, romanised: Balòc, Balochi: [bɐloːtʃ]; Also spelled Baluch (/bəˈluːtʃ/ bə-LOOCH) are an ethnic group which speaks the Western Iranian Balochi language and are native to the Balochistan region of South and West Asia, occupying parts of Pakistan, Iran, and Afghanistan. There are also Baloch diaspora communities in neighbouring regions, including in Central Asia, and the Arabian Peninsula. They were traditionally nomadic pastoralists.

The majority of the Baloch reside within Pakistan. About half of the total Baloch population lives in the Pakistani province of Balochistan, while 40% are settled in Sindh and a significant albeit smaller number resides in the Pakistani Punjab. They make up 3.6% of Pakistan's population, 2% of Iran's population, and around 0.5%–1% of the population of Afghanistan, and the largest non-Arab community in Oman.

== Etymology ==
The exact origin of the word "Baloch" is unclear. Ernst Emil Herzfeld believed that the word Baloch is derived from the Median term brza-vačiya meaning "loud shouting".

== Language ==
Balochi (بلۏچی, romanised: Balòci) is an Indo-European language, spoken by the Baloch and belonging to the Indo-Iranian branch of the family. As an Iranian language, it is classified in the Northwestern group, spoken primarily in the Balochistan region of Pakistan, Iran and Afghanistan. In addition, there are speakers in Oman, the Arab states of the Persian Gulf, Turkmenistan, East Africa and in diaspora communities in other parts of the world.

There are a number of characteristic features that Balochi shares to Parthian and Median and close affinity with them.

The Balochi dialects are classified as:

- Eastern group (the Soleimani dialect group)
- Southern group or Makrani dialect (part of the Makrani dialect group)
- Western group (part of the Rakhshani dialect group)

Koroshi is also classified as Balochi.

Many Baloch are either bilingual or multilingual, speaking the language of their respective nation of origin, such as Urdu, Persian, and Arabic as a second language alongside their native Balochi, while those in diaspora communities often speak three or more languages.

== History ==
=== Antiquity ===
During the Achaemenid rule, the Baloch were among rebellious Medes and Parthians who supported Bardiya against Darius I and later allied with Darius III in the Battle of Gaugamela with Alexander.

Šahrestānīhā ī Ērānšahr is a surviving Middle Persian text on Sasanian administrative geography and history, based on the source, Padishkhwārgar (located at the vicinity of Segistan) was a Sasanian province in Late Antiquity and people who contributed to building 21 cities in Padishkhwargar were the Kōfyār "mountain dweller" people called Baločān "Baloch".

During the Sassanid era, Anoshervan and Ardashir fought against the Baloch and after initially sustaining a defeat, succeeded in subjugating the Baloch. The Baloch scattered in the Makran (modern-day Balochistan in Iran and Pakistan) and Kerman regions, areas that formed the southeastern frontier of the Sassanid Empire. Periodic uprisings or refusals to pay tribute might have been part of their interactions with the Sassanid kings.

=== Medieval period ===
According to Baloch lore, their ancestors hail from Aleppo in what is now Syria. After the conflict against Abbasid caliph Harun under Ameer Hamza the Kharijites leader migrated to east or southeast of the central Caspian region, specially toward to east or southeast of the central Caspian region, specially toward Sistan, Iran.

Based on an analysis of the linguistic connections of the Balochi language, which is one of the Western Iranian languages, the original homeland of the Baloch tribes was likely to the east or southeast of the central Caspian region. The Baloch began migrating towards the east in the late Sasanian period. The cause of the migration is unknown but may have been as a result of the generally unstable conditions in the Caspian area. The migrations occurred over several centuries.

By the 9th century, Arab writers Istakhri, Yaqut al-Hamawi and al-Muqaddasī refer to the Baloch as a distinct ethnical group living in the area between Kerman, Khorasan, Sistan, and Makran. Ibn Khordadbeh, in Kitab al-Masalik wal-Mamalik, describes the geography of Makran, and mentions the Baloch as They are powerful, numerous, and engaged in animal husbandry, their houses are made of wood. Al-Muqaddasī documented that Panjgur was the capital of Makran and that it was populated by people called Baloch.

The 12th century Seljuk invasion of Kerman seemed to have stimulated the further eastwards emigration of the Baloch, towards what is now the Balochistan province of Pakistan, although some remained behind and there are still Baloch in the eastern parts of the Iranian Sistan-Baluchestan and Kerman provinces. By the 13th–14th centuries, waves of Baloch were moving into Sindh, and by the 15th century into the Punjab.

Traditionally, Jalal Khan was the ruler and founder of the first Baloch confederacy in the 12th century. Jalal Khan left four sons – Rind Khan, Lashar Khan, Hoth Khan, Korai Khan and a daughter, Bibi Jato, who married his nephew Murad. Since 12th century Baloch chieftains ruled over most of Balochistan. Mir Jalal khan and Mir Chakar after the establishment of the Baloch Confederation, They extended their dominance on outside the borders of Balochistan, Mir Chakar seized control over Punjab and captured Multan. The great Baloch kingdom was based on tribal confederation, Punjab and Balochistan remained under his rule for a period of time .

According to Akhtar Baloch, professor at University of Karachi, the Baloch migrated from Balochistan during the Little Ice Age and settled in Sindh and Punjab. The Little Ice Age is conventionally defined as a period extending from the sixteenth to the nineteenth centuries, or alternatively, from about 1300 to about 1850.

The area where the Baloch tribes settled was disputed between the Persian Safavids and the Mughal emperors. Although the Mughals managed to establish some control over the eastern parts of the area, by the 17th century, a tribal Brahui leader named Mir Hasan established himself as the first "Khan of the Baloch". In 1666, he was succeeded by Mir Aḥmad Khan Qambarani who established the Khanate of Kalat under the Ahmadzai dynasty. (Note: A number of unrelated tribes with the name Ahmadzai exist. There are two Pashtun tribes who are unrelated to each other with this name: the Ahmadzai who are a Waziri tribe and the Sulaimankhel Ahmadzai, part of the Ghilzai confederation. However, the Ahmadzai Khans of Khalat were neither of these and belonged to a Brahui tribe.) Originally in alliance with the Mughals, the Khanate lost its autonomy in 1839 with the signing of a treaty with the British colonial government and the region effectively became part of the British Raj.

=== Safavid period ===
The Baloch tribes revolted against the Safavid government. Engelbert Kaempfer writes about this: Despite their small numbers, they attacked Suleiman Shah with their fortifications.

=== Afsharid period ===
After the fall of the Safavids, Iran fell under the control of the Afsharid Empire ruled by Nader Shah. Nader Shah sought to consolidate and expand his empire, which brought him into contact with the Baloch. Mohammad Khan Baloch became military commander in Afsharid Iran and Nader appointed Mohammad Khan Baloch the governor of fars, Kohgiluyeh and Khuzestan. Many Baloch were moved to Khorasan in order to protect the eastern border from invading Afghans during the reign of afsharid dynasty.

=== Khanate of Kalat ===
The Khanate of Kalat founded in the 16th century by Mir Altaz Sani Khan Qambrani and played an important part of Baloch history. The major figure in its establishment was Mir Ahmad Khan, who, established his authority over Kalat. The dynasty established as a tribal confederacy of Brahui tribes and emerged as a political entity that consolidated the power of these tribes under a single ruler, known as the Khan. Mir Ahmad Khan I was strong enough to capture Quetta, Mastung, and Pishin from the Mughal governor at Kandahar.

Nasir Khan I Ahmadzai the sixth ruler of kalat was one of the most prominent and influential rulers of the Khanate of Kalat. He played a crucial role in consolidating Baloch power, unifying the Baloch tribes, and shaping the political and administrative structure of the Khanate. The border of Balochestan in the reign of Nasir khan stretched from across modern-day Pakistan, Iran, and Afghanistan. Northern Border in areas such as Helmand and parts of Kandahar (Balochistan, Afghanistan). In the East stretched as far as Punjab including Dera Ghazi Khan, in the south Makran coast along the Arabian Sea from Karachi to Bandar Abbas, in the western included Persian Balochistan (modern-day Sistan and Baluchestan Province in Iran), Kerman and Bandar abbas.

The Khanate of Kalat declined in the early 19th century, losing much of its territory to Qajar Iran, Emirate of Afghanistan and British Balochistan.

=== Talpur period ===
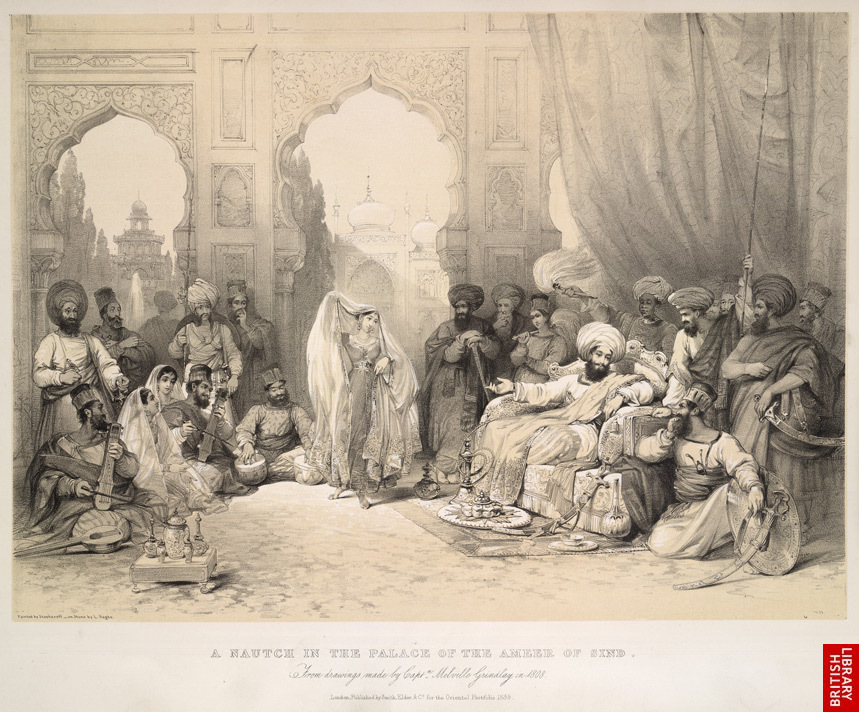
Baloch Emir of Sindh in 1808

Talpur was a Baloch dynasty that originated in the modern-day Sindh region of Pakistan. The Talpur ruled the Sindh until British conquest of Sindh in 1843. The Talpur Baloch were a prominent Baloch tribe that rose to power in Sindh during the late 18th century and established their rule. The Battle of Miani (1843), took place near Hyderabad, Baloch forces under the last Talpur ruler Amir Nasir Khan Talpur defeated by the East India Company led by Charles Napier.

=== Modern era ===
For centuries, Balochistan was governed autonomously and local Baloch chieftains ruled Balochistan.

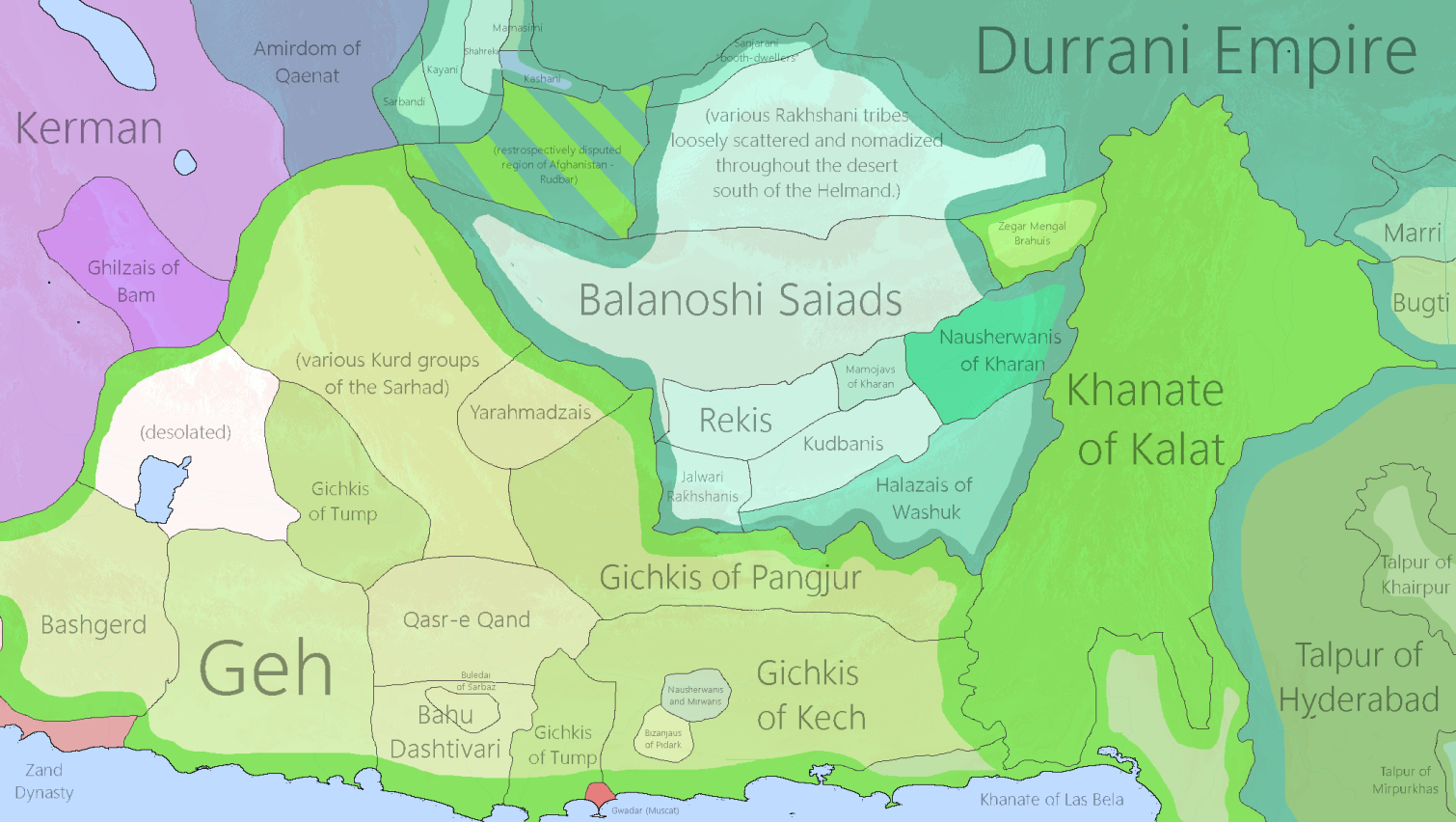
Balochistan in 1789, which included the Kalat Khanate and the states under its rule.

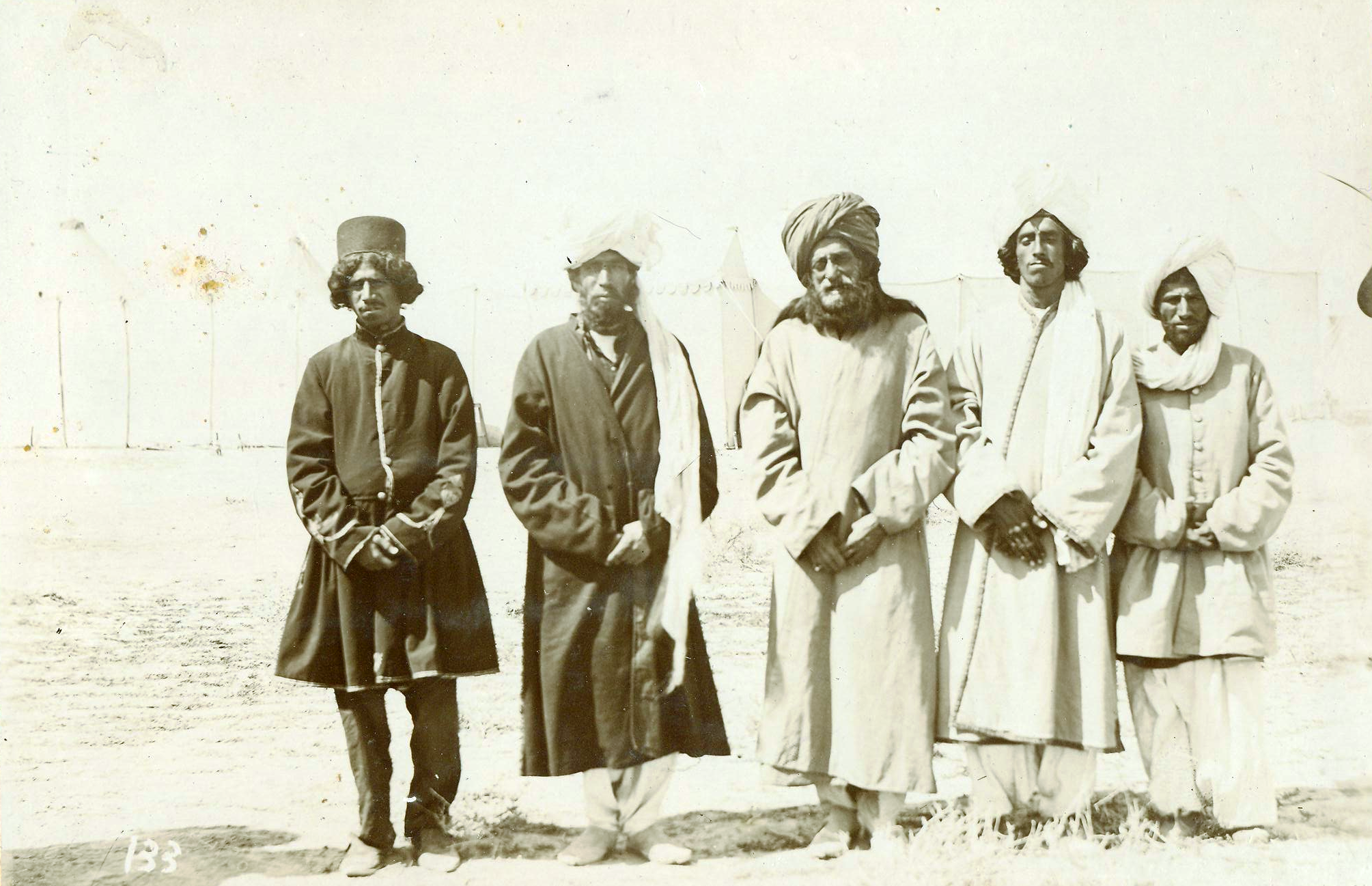
Sardar Ibrahim Khan Sanjrani, Baloch Sardar of Sistan, c. 1884

Baloch tribes in the Sarhad resisted the Persian government force. Gamshadzai, Yar Ahmadzai, Ismailzai and Kurd tribes fought against Persian force during 1888. Sanjrani Baloch ruled Seistan with its capital at Chakansur in the early and late 19th century. In 1897 the western regions of Balochistan were under the leadership of the chieftains of the Narui tribe.

Baloch nationalism in its modern form began in the form of the Anjuman-e-Ittehad-e-Balochan-wa-Balochistan based in Mastung in 1929, led by Yousaf Aziz Magsi, Abdul Aziz Kurd and others. In Pakistan's Balochistan province, insurgencies by Baloch nationalists have been fought in 1948–50, 1958–60, 1962–63 and 1973–1977, with an ongoing low-level insurgency beginning in 2003. The Baloch population in Pakistan has endured grave violations of human rights, which include extrajudicial killings, enforced disappearances, and torture. These actions are purportedly perpetrated by state security forces and their associates.

The First Balochistan conflict started when three of the princely states of Kalat acceded to Pakistan in 1947 after independence.

During the Second Balochistan conflict The Baloch nationalist leader Nawab Nauroz Khan led an armed rebellion against the central government, demanding greater autonomy. This triggered a major armed conflict, with over 50,000 Baloch fighters resisting the Pakistani military.

The Third Balochistan conflict began and engaging in guerrilla warfare against the Pakistani military. Sher Mohammad Marri led militants into guerrilla warfare from 1963 to 1969 by creating their own insurgent bases. This insurgency ended in 1969, with the Baloch separatists agreeing to a ceasefire granting general amnesty to the separatists as well as freeing the separatists.

== Baloch communities ==
=== Pakistan ===
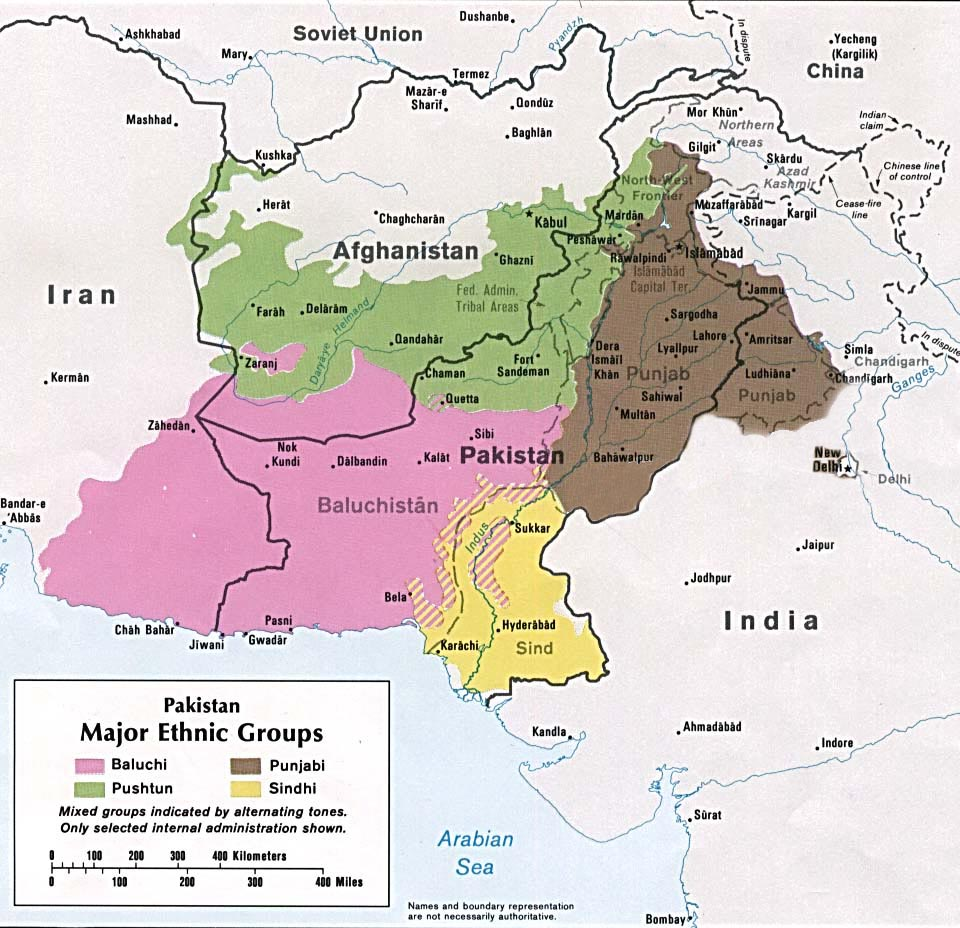
Baloch-inhabited areas (pink) of Pakistan, Afghanistan, and Iran in 1980

About half of the total Baloch population live in the Pakistani province of Balochistan while 40% are settled in Sindh and a significant albeit smaller number reside in the Pakistani Punjab.

In 2008, there were 180,000 Bugti based in Dera Bugti District. They are divided between the Rahija Bugti, Masori Bugti, Kalpar Bugti, Marehta Bugti and other sub-tribes. led the Bugti as Tumandar until his death in 2006. Talal Akbar Bugti was the tribal leader and President of the Jamhoori Watan Party from 2006 until his death in 2015.

There are 98,000 Marri based in Kohlo district in 2008, who further divide themselves into Gazni Marri, Bejarani Marri, and Zarkon Marri.

As of 2008 it was estimated that there were between eight and nine million Baloch people living in Afghanistan, Iran and Pakistan. They were subdivided between over 130 tribes. Some estimates put the figure at over 150 tribes, though estimates vary depending on how subtribes are counted. The tribes, known as taman, are led by a tribal chief, the tumandar. Subtribes, known as paras, are led by a muqaddam.

The Baloch holds a significant place in the history of Sindh. The Talpur, originally a Baloch tribe, ruled Sindh from 1783 to 1843. A significant population in sindh have Baloch roots with unofficial estimates placing the number at about 4 million.

=== Iran ===
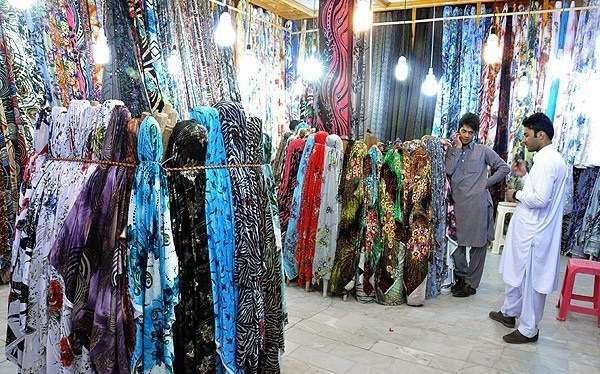
Two Baloch men in the Zahedan market

Baloch in Iran are the majority ethnic inhabitants of the region of Sistan and Baluchestan province in Iran. The town of Jask in neighbouring Hormozgan province is also inhabited by Baloch people. Baloch people also make up a minority in the eastern parts of Kerman, Razavi Khorasan and South Khorasan (Khorasani Baloch) and are scattered throughout other provinces of Iran. They speak the Rakhshani and Sarawani dialects of Balochi, an Iranian language.

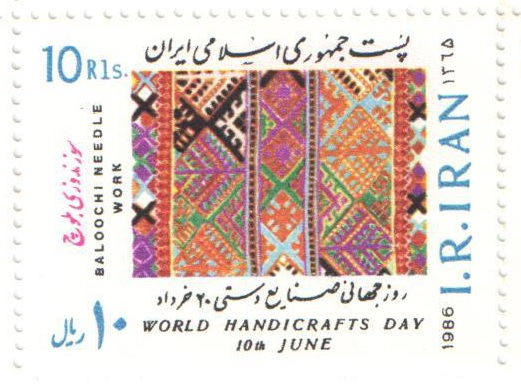
Baloch needlework highlighted on a stamp of Iran, 1986

Sistan and Balochestan is one of the poorest and least developed provinces in Iran. Basic infrastructure, such as roads, schools, and hospitals, is lacking compared to other regions. The unemployment rate is disproportionately high, especially among Baloch youth. The majority of Iranian Baloch are Sunni Muslims, which distinguishes them from the predominantly Shia Muslim population of Iran. This religious difference has often contributed to tensions between the Baloch and the central government.

During the 1950s, a tribal revolt led by a Baloch farmer – Mir Daad Shah – struck south eastern Iran. Elements of Baloch nationalism were present in this movement, and he participated in a rebellion and armed insurgency against the Shah of Iran, Mohammad Reza Pahlavi, in the 1950s.

On September 30, 2022 (Bloody Friday) a large number of Baloch civilians gathered for Friday prayers at the Grand Makki Mosque, the largest Sunni mosque in Iran, located in Zahedan. After the prayers, peaceful demonstrations began, demanding justice for the alleged rape of a 15-year-old Baloch girl in June by a commander of the police force in Chabahar. Iranian security forces, including the Islamic Revolutionary Guard Corps (IRGC) and riot police, surrounded the area and opened fire on the protesters. According to human rights organisations such as Amnesty International and Baloch activist groups, at least 96 people were killed on the day of the massacre, and hundreds were injured. Molavi Abdolhamid Ismaeelzahi called the incident a "catastrophe" and demanded "trial and punishment for those responsible for those who have killed people", adding that worshipers were shot in the head and heart by snipers. From this event, a picture of Khodanur Lojei, a Baloch protester whose hands were tied to a flagpole, with a cup of water put in front of him (but out of his reach) became a symbol in the ongoing protests.

=== Afghanistan ===
Baloch constitute roughly 0.5%–1% Afghanistan's population. They are the majority in Nimroz Province. Baloch also have a presence in Helmand, Faryab, Takhar, Herat, Kandahar, and other parts of Afghanistan.

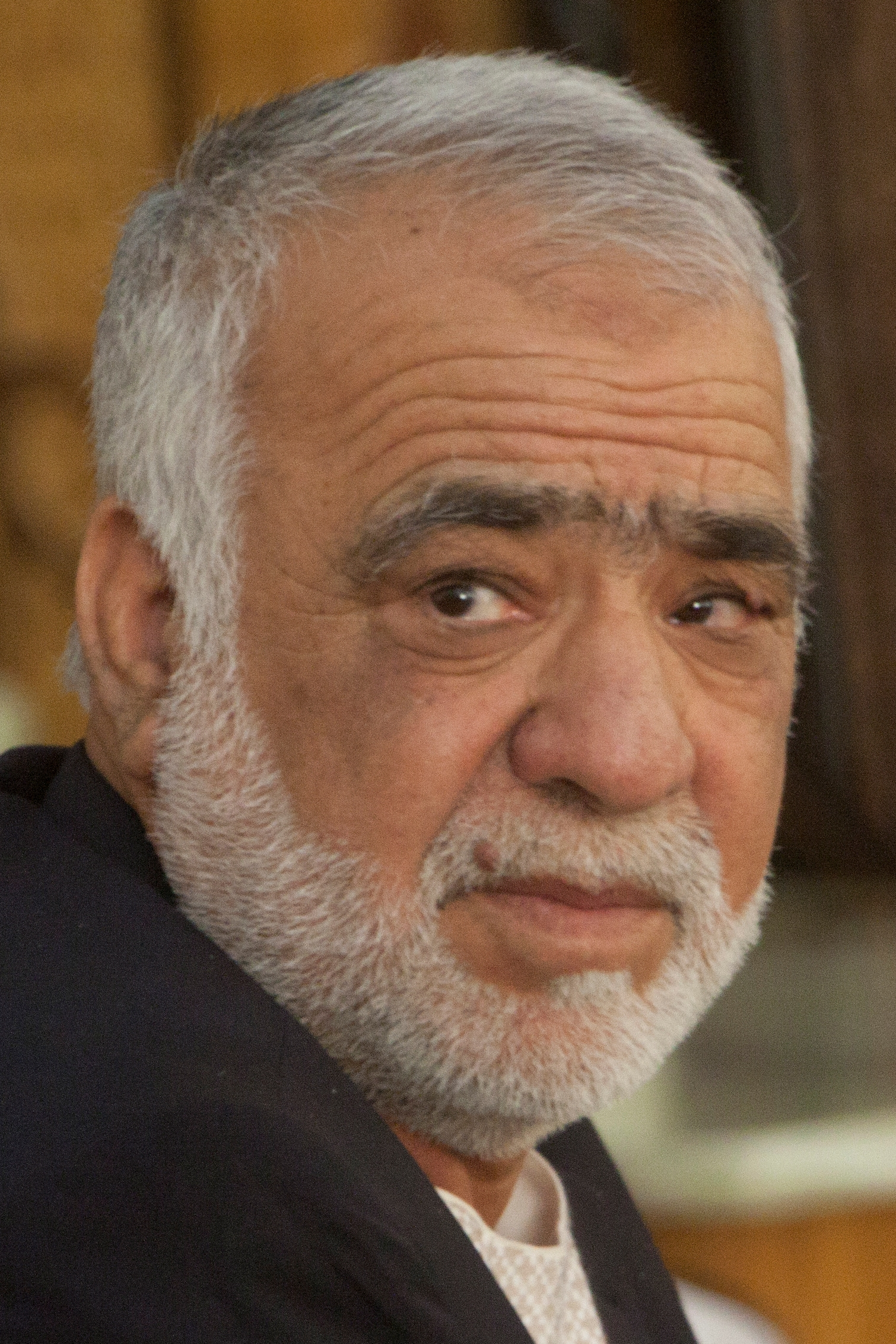
Naeem Baloch, Former governor of Helmand province

Rug weaving is a common profession among the Baloch tribes of Afghanistan. Balochi rugs and floor coverings are sold in the Herat local market as well as worldwide. Needlework and handicrafts are the art of Baloch women in Afghanistan. Baloch women wear clothes called "Za Asteen Guptan", which are designed with Baloch needlework and embroidery. Owning and breeding camels, as well as holding camel riding competitions in Nimroz province, is popular among the Baloch.

In the fall of 1978, Balochi was recognised as an official language of Afghanistan, alongside Pashto and Dari. A weekly newspaper in Balochi began publication in September 1978. The Baloch Council of Afghanistan is a Baloch socio-cultural organisation that celebrates Baloch Culture Day every year.

The government of Afghanistan has always been implacably opposed to any suggestion of Baloch separatism. Since the fall of Kabul in 2021, the Taliban has been accused of having anti-Baloch bias.

Ghulam Mohammad Lalzad Baloch, Mohammad Naeem Baloch, are some of the notable Baloch people in Afghanistan.

=== Oman ===
Baloch account for 20% of Oman's population, a total of around 1 million people and the largest non-Arab community in Oman. The first modern army of Oman was exclusively Baloch, and even today around 40% of the Omani Army consists of Baloch people.

The Baloch have been well integrated into Oman political life. The Baloch hold many high-ranking jobs and have played a significant role in the progress and development of Oman.

=== India ===
There are around 300 Baloch families living in Mumbai, numbering about 1,500 individuals. They are scattered across the outer western suburbs and ghettos of Mumbai's metropolitan area. The vast majority of them belong to the working class background, having little formal education, and are employed as manual labourers or drivers.

=== Turkmenistan ===
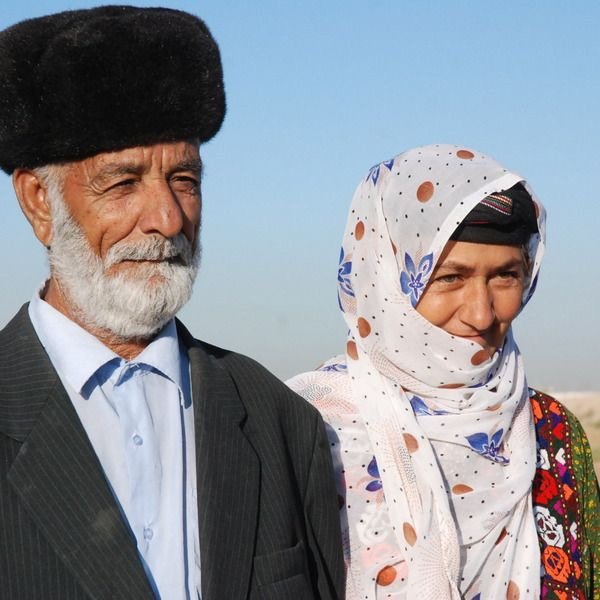
Baloch in Turkmenistan

Baloch are also found in Turkmenistan mainly Merv and smaller numbers in other areas. They immigrated into the Merv and the Murghab River inland delta from the areas west and north of Herat, Afghanistan, Chakhansur District in the province of Nimruz and Iran in the mid 19th century. In 1926 the Baluch of Merv Oasis numbered 9,974. Their numbers fell to 7,842 in the official statistics by 1959 but then rose to 12,582 by 1970 and 18,997 by 1979.

=== Diaspora ===
==== Persian Gulf Countries ====
The Baluch people have a notable presence in the Persian Gulf countries, including: Oman, Kuwait, UAE, Qatar, and Bahrain.

==== North America ====
There was substantial immigration of ethnic Baloch in the United States and Canada who are mainly political refugees and immigrants seeking economic opportunity. A 2015 eight-part documentary by VSH News, the first Balochi language news channel, called Balochs in America, shows that Baloch Americans live in different parts of the United States, including Washington D.C., New York, Texas, North Carolina and Washington.

==== Australia ====
There is a considerable number of Baloch who settled in Australia for education and employment opportunities. Small Baloch groups of cameleers were shipped in and out of Australia at three-year intervals, to service the Australian inland pastoral industry by carting goods and transporting wool bales by camel trains. Baloch cameleers worked the Western Australian Goldfields in the late 1890s.

==== Europe ====
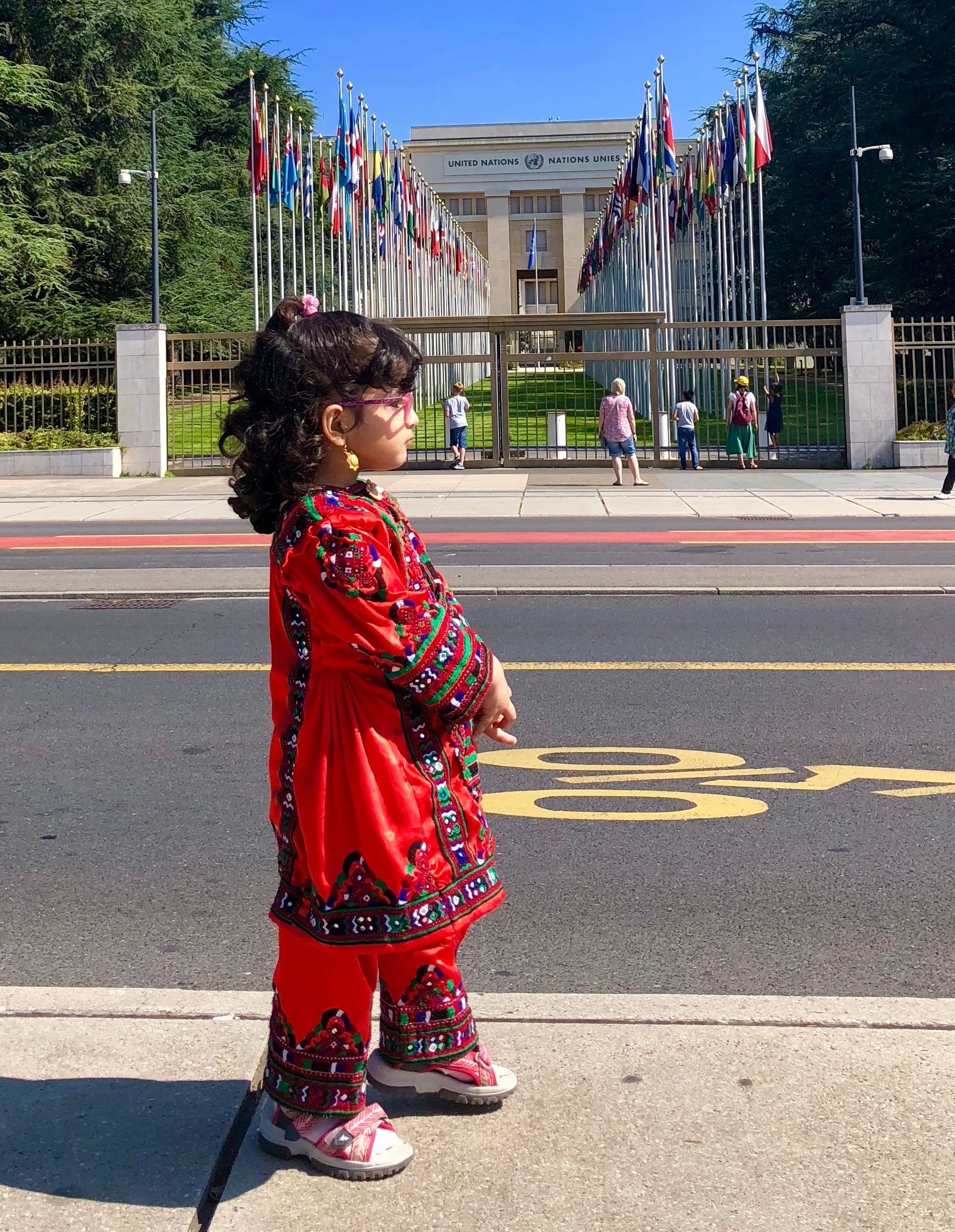
A Baloch Girl in Switzerland

There are also significant populations in Norway, Sweden, and other European countries.

Most Baloch people in Sweden live in the capital Stockholm or in Uppsala. A majority of Baloch political refugees and students choose Sweden as their host country and therefore they have a cultural presence in Sweden.

Uppsala University offers a course titled Balochi A, which provides basic knowledge of the phonetics and syntax of the Balochi language. This course also includes a brief overview of the history of the Baloch people. The course is conducted in English and is available as a distance learning option, making it accessible to a broader audience interested in learning about the Balochi language. Carina Jahani, a prominent Swedish Iranologist and professor of Iranian languages at Uppsala University, is deeply involved in researching the Balochi language and its preservasion.

There is a Baloch community in the UK, originating from the Balochistan province of southwestern Pakistan and nearby areas. Estimates suggest that the Baloch community in London numbers in the thousands, though an exact figure is not available. There are many Baloch associations and groups active in the UK, including the Baloch Students and Youth Association (BSYA), Baloch Cultural Society, Baloch Human Rights Council (UK) and others.

==== East Africa ====
There is also a small but historic Baloch community in East Africa, left over from when the Sultanate of Muscat ruled over Zanzibar and the Swahili Coast.

== Baloch culture ==
Gold ornaments such as necklaces and bracelets are an important aspect of Baloch women's traditions and among their most favoured items of jewellery are dorr, heavy earrings that are fastened to the head with gold chains so that the heavy weight will not cause harm to the ears. They usually wear a gold brooch (tasni) that is made by local jewellers in different shapes and sizes and is used to fasten the two parts of the dress together over the chest.

Baloch Culture Day is celebrated by the Baloch people annually on 2 March with festivities to celebrate their rich culture and history.

=== Women ===
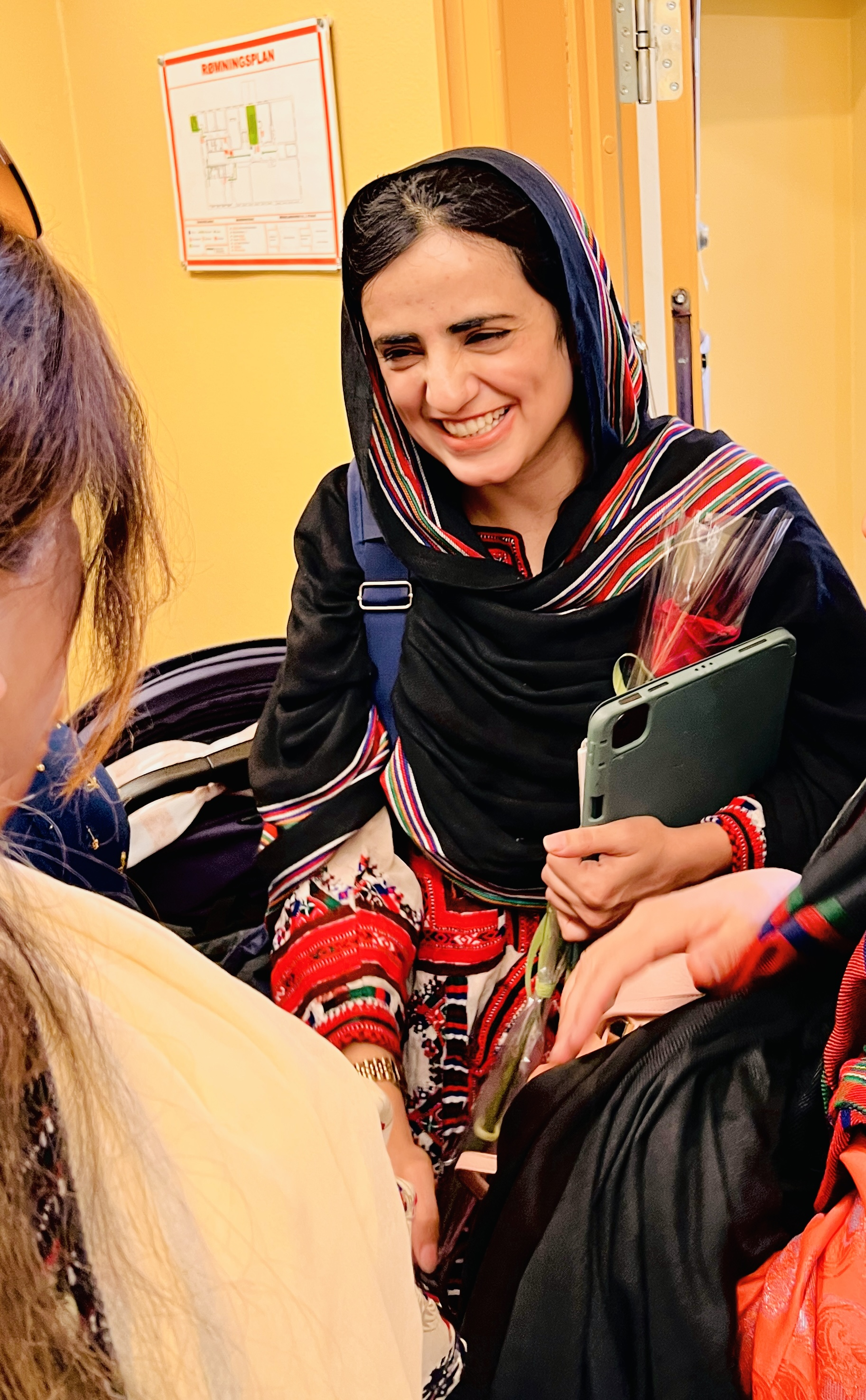
Mahrang Baloch, Human Rights Activist

In general, Baloch women's rights and equality have improved in the recent years due to political movements within Baloch society. However, despite the progress, Baloch and international women's rights organisations still report significant human rights issues related to gender equality, forced marriages, and honour killings.

Baloch women have taken the lead in the new wave of Baloch movements and have emerged as leaders and advocates for Baloch rights. In the movement of Baloch Long March two baloch women leading the movement for justice and equality in Baloch society against human rights violations and enforced disappearances in Balochistan. Mahrang Baloch and Sammi Deen Baloch the leader of the Baloch Yakjehti Committee and Voice for Baloch Missing Persons and have been prominent advocate for the rights of Baloch people. In December 2024, Marang Baloch was included on the BBC's 100 Women list. Sammi Baloch has been honoured with the Asia Pacific Human Rights Award for 2024, presented by Front Line Defenders. The award ceremony took place in Dublin, Ireland.

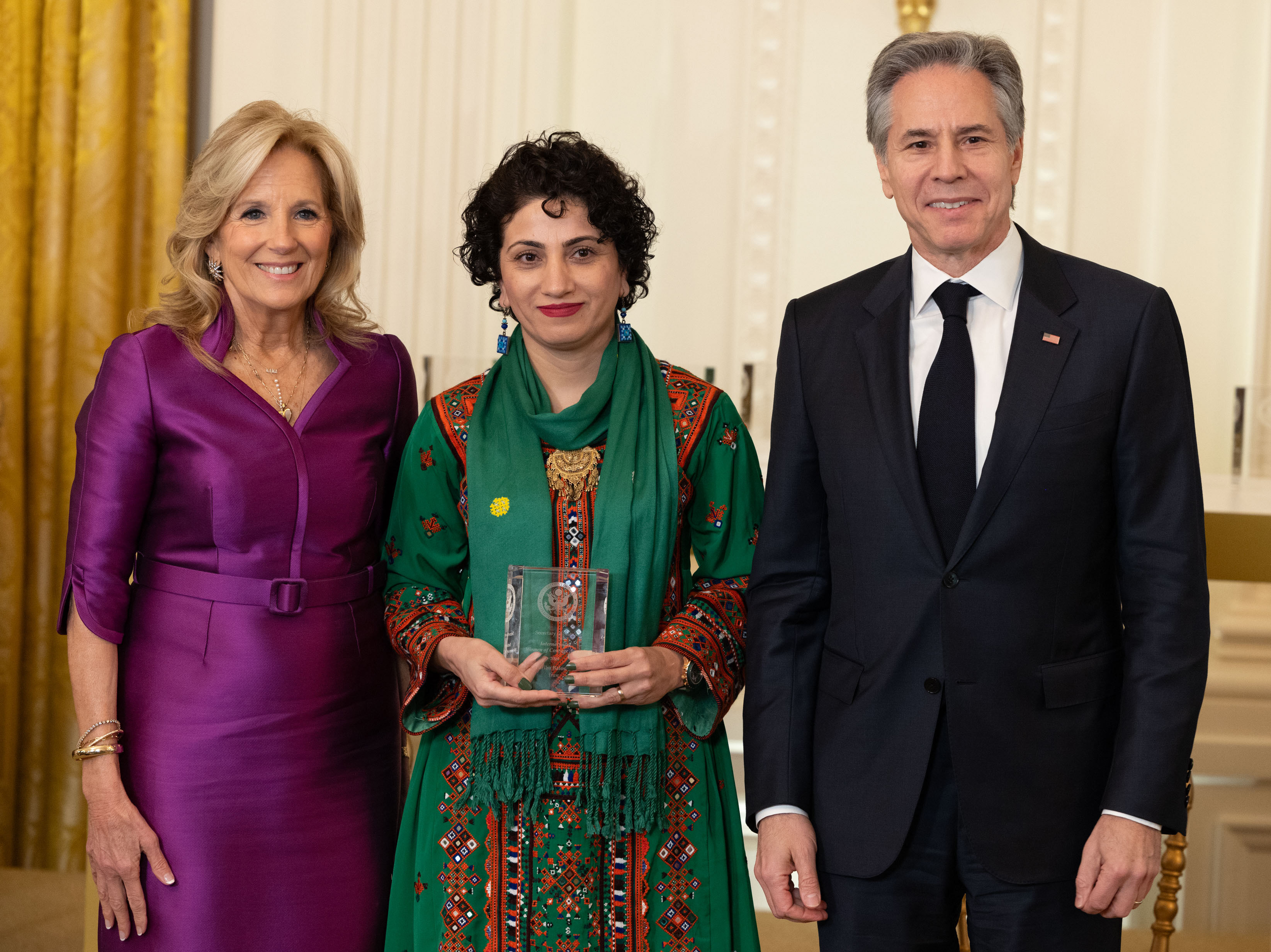
Fariba Baloch in the 18th annual International Women of Courage Award Ceremony at the White House in Washington

Fariba Baloch is another Baloch women who works for women's rights and human rights in Balochistan in Iran. She is particularly outspoken about the challenges faced by women in Balochistan region, advocating for gender equity and justice amidst widespread human rights abuses. She received the 2024 International Women of Courage award.

Karima Baloch was a human rights activist and was included in the 100 Women List by the BBC in 2016, where she was identified as a political activist campaigning for the independence for Balochistan from Pakistan. Her inclusion in the BBC 100 list as a Baloch woman was repeated in 2024 when the Iranian Zhina Modares Gorji bookseller was also named for her struggle for freedom of speech.

Baloch Women have played numerous roles, and contributed in many ways, to Baloch society. Historically, tradition maintained. Banadi Shehak the sister of Mir Chakar Rind was a Baloch woman who led the war and participated in the battlefield.

=== Folklore ===
Baloch folklore (Balochi: بلوچ لوک) consists of folk traditions which have developed in Balochistan over many centuries. The majority of such folk traditions are preserved in the Balochi language and deal with themes such as tragic love, resistance and war. The history of Baloch tribes is captured in the ballads which narrate the conflicts and wars fought by various clans, celebrating the valor of tribal chiefs and heroes.

Hani and Sheh Mureed, a tragic love story. It tells of the deep love between Hani and Sheh Mureed and the societal pressures that ultimately lead to their separation.

Mir Hammal Jiand is a significant figure in Baloch folklore, Baloch culture and Balochi literature, particularly noted for his role during the conflicts with Portuguese colonial forces in the 16th century. He is celebrated as a heroic leader and is often compared to other notable Baloch leaders like Mir Chakar Rind.

Widely varying in purpose and style, among the Baloch folklore one will find stories about nature, anthropomorphic animals, love, heroes and villains, mythological creatures and everyday life. Baloch mythology often intertwines with their beliefs and geography, featuring the supernatural. A number of these mythological figures can be found in other cultures, like stories of Shahnameh and Iranian Mythology. Ashkash is introduced in several verses in the Shahnameh as the commander of the Baloch army. This work has inspired Baloch heroic tales and has appeared in the works of Baloch writers and Baloch folklore.

=== Music and Dance ===
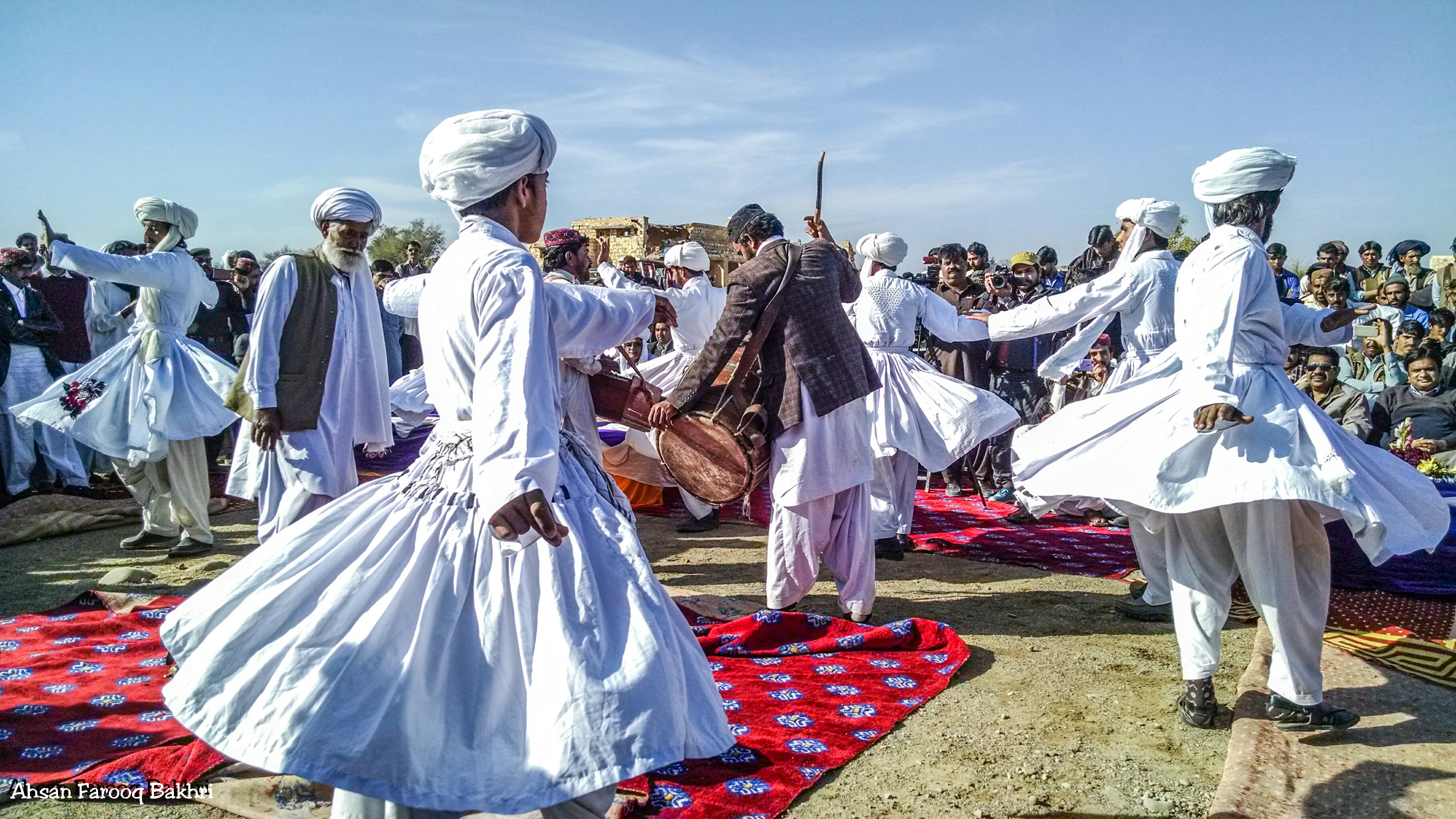
Baloch men performing a traditional dance.

In ancient times, especially during the pre-Islamic era, it was common for Baloch women to perform dances and sing folk songs at different events. The tradition of a Baloch mother singing lullabies to her children has played an important role in the transfer of knowledge from generation to generation since ancient times. Apart from the dressing style of the Baloch, indigenous and local traditions and customs are also of great importance to the Baloch.

Zahīrōk is one of the musical forms of Baloch and in the beginning, was only sung by two groups of Baloch women.

Suroz and Ghaychak are popular instrument between Balochs such as craftspeople, folk artists, folk musicians and dance groups.

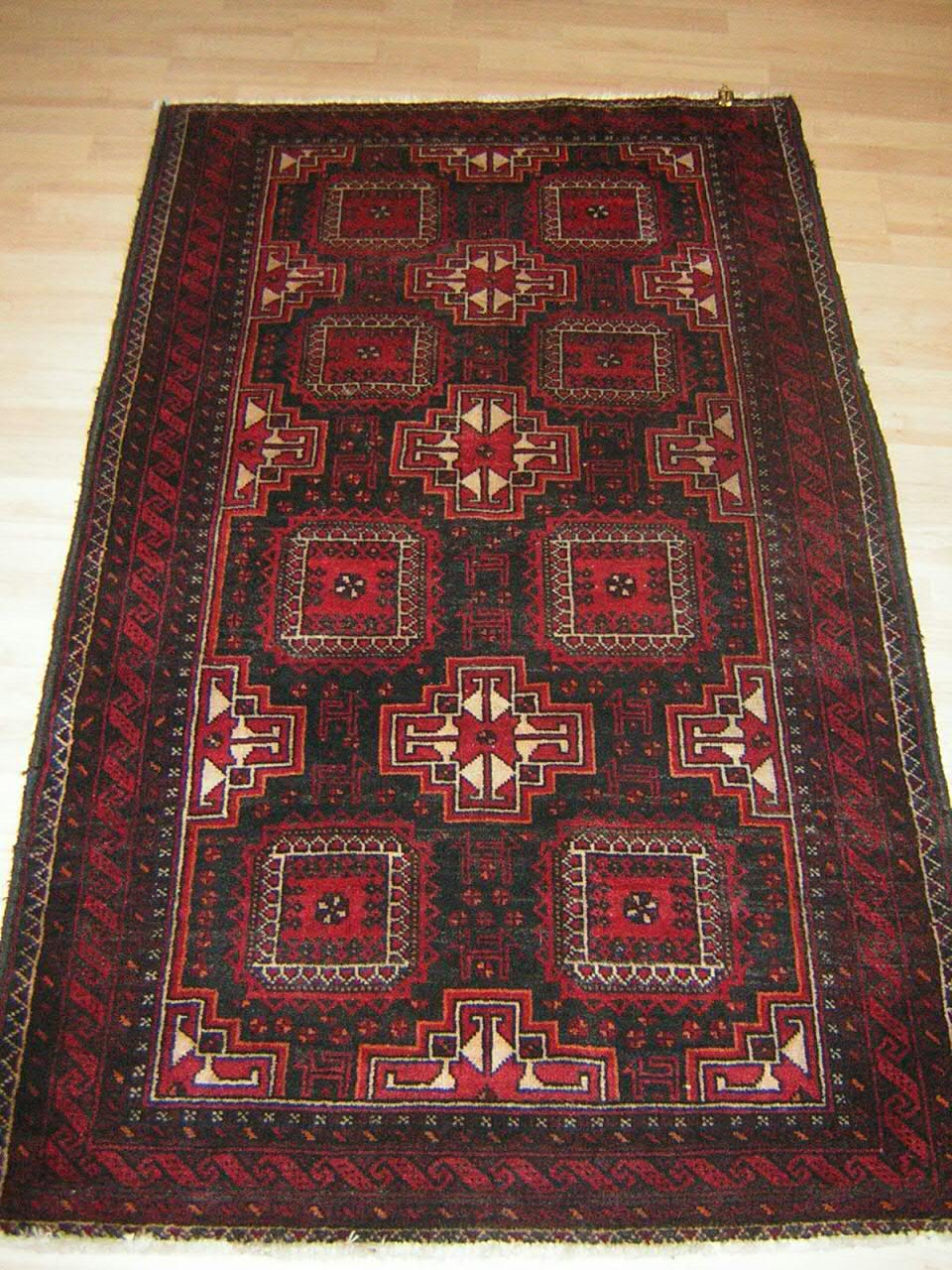
Balouchi rug

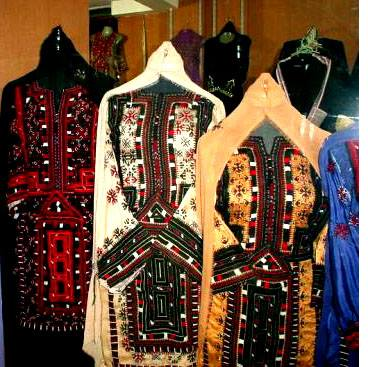
Needlework of Baloch women's clothes

=== Weaving ===
Balochi weaving is renowned throughout the world, with fine specimens of both rugs and carpets. The most famous balochi rugs are those from Nimruz and Khorasan. Wool is the primary material used, sourced from sheep and goats. In some cases, camel hair or a mix of natural fibres is also used. Mehrabi is a prayer rug designed in the Balochi style, and it typically features a mihrab or arch at one end of the rug.

=== Handicrafts ===
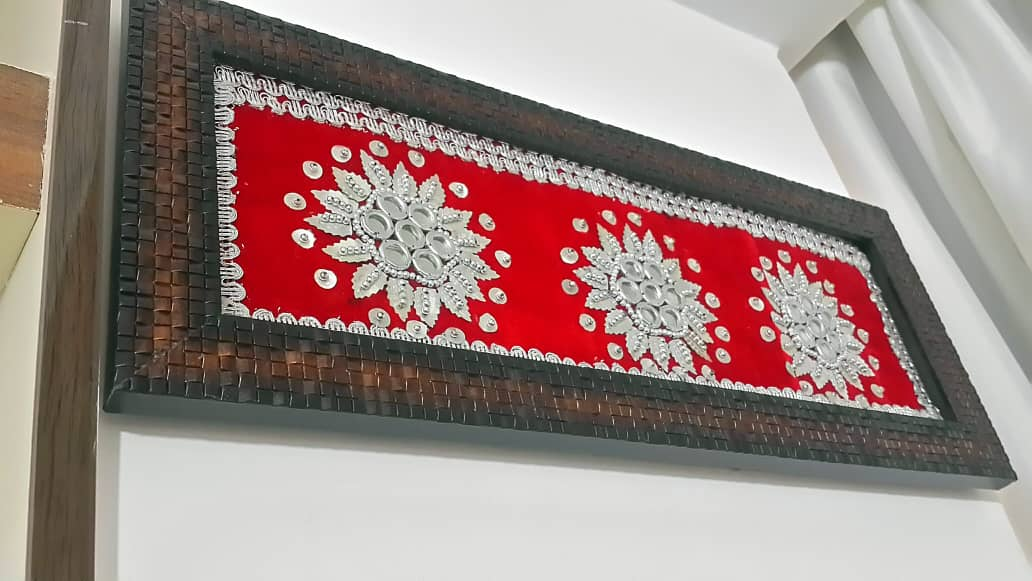
Balochi mirror embroidery

Balochi handicrafts are handicraft or handmade crafted works originating from Baloch people.

Balochi mirror work embroidery is a type of traditional Balochi embroidery and art that is used to decorate coats, cloth, hat(pag), cushion covers, tablecloths, bags, shoes, vests, local clothing between Baloch of Afghanistan and Pakistan.

Balochi coin work embroidery is one of the handicrafts of Balochistan that the Baloch generally use to decorate bedspreads or camel necks during weddings, and they often hang them on the walls to decorate rooms. Balochi coin embroidery is very popular among the Baloch people in Iran and has created a large market.

Outside of weaving and clothing, there are many other Baloch needleworks, decorations on balochi dress is a tradition in Baloch culture including Balochi cap, jackets, belts, ladies purse, shoulder bags, and many other items. These crafts are known for their intricate designs, vibrant colours, and high-quality craftsmanship. They are often made by women artisans and serve both functional and decorative purposes, playing a significant role in the economy and identity of the Baloch community. Notable Balochi needlework artisans include Mahtab Norouzi. Farah Diba Pahlavi, the former Shahbanu of Iran, was particularly drawn to Balochi needlework handcrafts and incorporated them into many of her formal dresses.

Among crafts are coin embroidery and cream embroidery that are made with natural materials.

== Genetics ==
For most Balochs, haplogroup R1a is the most common paternal clade. The majority of Balochs belong to R1a, with a frequency of 34–36%.

== Religion ==
=== Islam ===
The Baloch are predominantly Muslim, with the vast majority belonging to the Hanafi school of Sunni Islam, but there is also a very small number of Shia in Balochistan.

In the case of Pakistan, breakdown by religious movements or sub-groups among the ethnic Baloch in the country as a whole is as following: 64.78% are Sunni-Deobandis, 33.38% are Sunni-Barelvis and 1.25% are Sunni-Ahl-i Hadith; Shia's are 0.59%. In Pakistan's Balochistan province the religious affiliation among the Baloch is: 68.75% Sunni-Deobandi, 30.38% Sunni-Barelvis, 0.79% Sunni-Ahl-i Hadith and 0.07% Shi'as.

==== Islamism ====
Although Baloch leaders, backed by traditional scholarship, have held that the Baloch people are secular, C. Christine Fair and Ali Hamza found during their 2017 study that, when it comes to Islamism, "contrary to the conventional wisdom, Baloch are generally indistinguishable from other Pakistanis in Balochistan or the rest of Pakistan". There are virtually no statistically significant or substantive differences between Baloch Muslims and other Muslims in Pakistan in terms of religiosity, support for a sharia-compliant Pakistan state, liberating Muslims from oppression including Kashmir, etc.

==== Zikri sect ====
In 2020, 800,000 Pakistani Baloch were estimated to follow the Zikri sect.

=== Zoroastrian influences ===
Before the Islam era, the Baloch were the followers of Mazdakian and Manichean sects of Zoroastrian.

A number of Baloch tribes still preserve and adhere to pre-Islamic traditions, including the Nal oath (a type of oath to prove innocence by passing through fire) which is common among the Baloch around Taftan, and they are bilingual, speaking Parsiwani in addition to the Balochi language.

=== Hindu and Sikh minorities ===
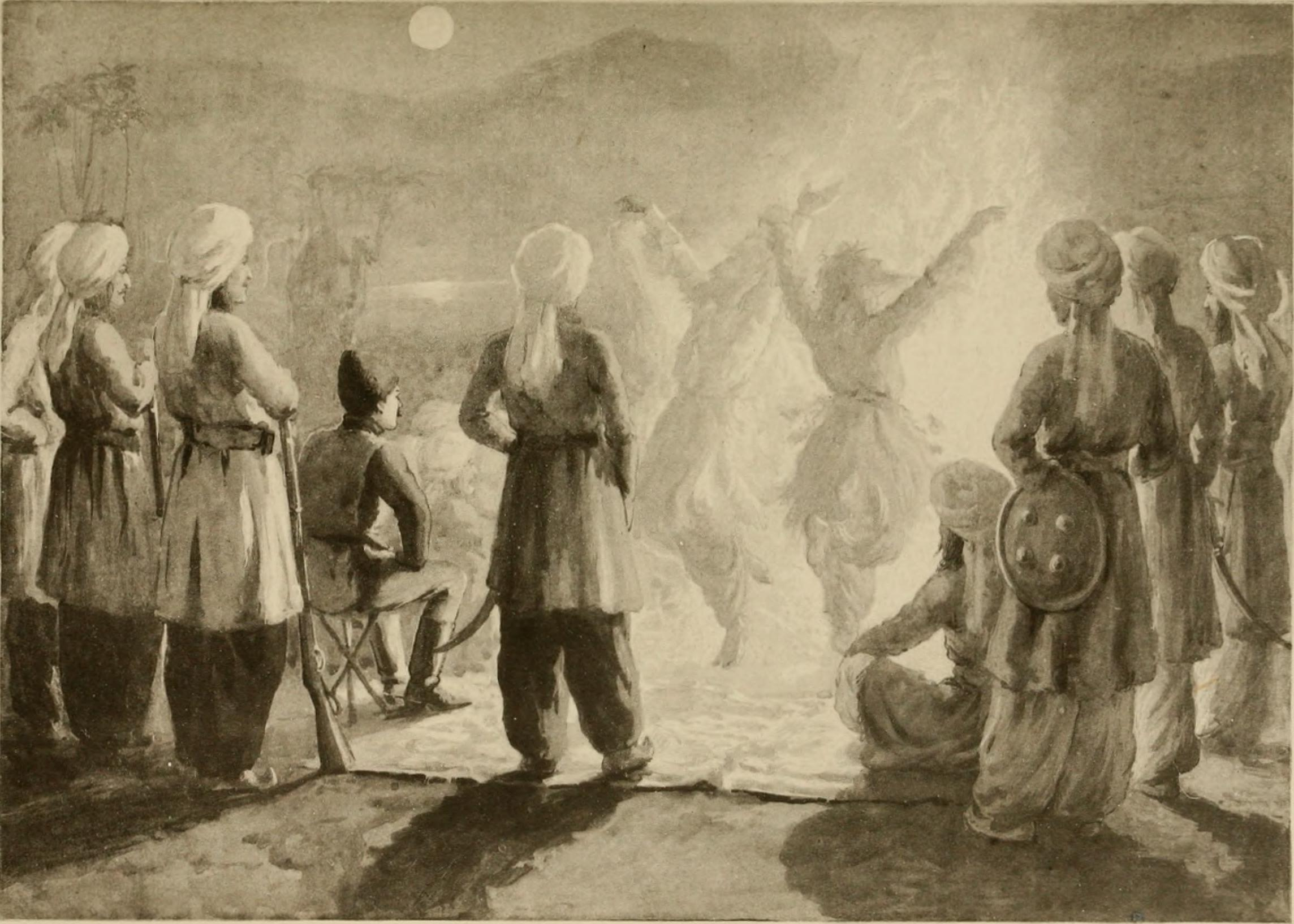
A zigri, a type of folk dance, in Gwarjak in 1891

A small number of Balochs are non-Muslims, particularly in the Bugti clan which has Hindu and Sikh members. There are ethnic Hindu Balochs in the Bugti, Marri, Rind, Bezenjo, Zehri, Mengal and other Baloch tribes. They also live under the Baloch tribal system. Balochi Hindus often include their tribal or regional name alongside their Hindu surname.

Likewise, the Bhagnaris are a Hindu community living in India who trace their origin to southern Balochistan but migrated to India during the Partition. Numbering around 2,500 in Mumbai they identify as Sindhis in terms of ethnicity and speak Saraiki, a language close to Punjabi.

=== Mythology ===
According to the 11th-century Shahnameh of Ferdowsi which narrates a mythological past of Iran, the Baloch were among Kay Khosrow's allies and formed part of his army headed by general Ashkash. Ashkash was assigned by Kay Khosrow to Governor of Makran and during Kay Khosrow's campaign against Turan, he commanded the Kuch and Baloch army from Makran. This is depicted in the mythological part of the Shahnameh a prose work written in Middle Persian.

"Next after Gostaham came shrewd Aškash
endowed with prudent heart and ready brain
An army of warriors of the kuch and Baloch
Scheming war like the faighting-ram
No one in the word has seen(them tun) their backs
No one has seen(as much as) one of their fingers unarmed”
They have brought a banners with the figure of a leopard
from whose banners war rained down”

Also in another piece of this pose which is depicted in the same work:

"Also from Pahlav and Pars and Koch o Baloch"
from the warriors of Gilan and Dasht-e Soroch" (Note: Dasht-e Soroch: The name of a plain in the Kerman region)

== Notable people ==
=== Pakistan ===
- Abdul Rashid Ghazi (1964–2007), Pakistani diplomat and Islamic scholar
- Maulana Muhammad Abdullah (1935–1998), Islamic scholar who served as Chairman of Ruet-e-Hilal Committee.
- Nabi Bakhsh Baloch (1917–2011), research scholar, historian, educationist and linguist in Urdu, English, Persian and Sindhi languages.
- Aftab Baloch (1953–2022), a former Pakistani cricketer.
- Abdul Qadir Baloch (born 1945), a retired General in the Pakistan army. Currently a Pakistani politician.
- Mahnoor Baloch (born 1970), Canadian Pakistani actress.
- Naz Baloch (born 1981), Pakistani female politician.
- Quratulain Balouch, Pakistani American singer and songwriter.
- Kiran Maqsood Baluch (born 1978), a Pakistani woman cricketer.
- Akbar Bugti (1926–2006), the former Tumandar of the Bugti tribe and Minister of State of Balochistan Province.
- Maulana Abdul Aziz, (born 1960), Imam of Red Mosque
- Sarfraz Bugti (born 1981), former member of the Pakistani Senate and current chief minister of Balochistan.
- Sardar Usman Buzdar (born 1969), former chief minister of Punjab province.
- Eva B, hip hop rapper and singer.
- Mir Jafar Khan Jamali (1911–1967), a veteran politician from Muslim League and a tribal leader from Balochistan
- Zafarullah Khan Jamali (1944–2020), the 15th prime minister of Pakistan.
- Kaifi Khalil (born 1996), singer-songwriter.
- Sardar Mohammad Ayub Khan Gadhi, (born 1961) Member of the Provincial Assembly and ex-Minister for Counter Terrorism Punjab.
- Zulfiqar Ali Khosa (born 1935), a former governor of Punjab province.
- Latif Khosa (born 1946), a former Governor of Punjab.
- Asif Saeed Khan Khosa (born 1954), the 26th chief justice of Pakistan.
- Mir Hazar Khan Khoso (1929–2021), jurist and caretaker prime minister of Pakistan from 25 March to 5 June 2013.
- Muhammad Muqeem Khan Khoso (1949–2016), a former Chief Sardar of the Khoso Tribe and former Member of the Provincial Assembly from PS-14 Jacobabad.
- Bilal Lashari (born 1981), Pakistani filmmaker, cinematographer, screenwriter and actor.
- Farooq Leghari (1940–2010), the 8th president of Pakistan.
- Hasnain Lehri (born 1989), Pakistani actor and model.
- Khair Bakhsh Marri (1928–2014), was a Baloch politician from the province of Balochistan in Pakistan.
- Sherbaz Khan Mazari (1930–2020), a Baluch veteran politician.
- Shireen Mazari (born 1949), the federal minister for human rights and a member of Pakistan Tehreek-e-Insaf.
- Muniba Mazari (born 1987), human rights activist, artist and motivational speaker.
- Sardar Mir Balakh Sher Mazari (1928–2022), the interim prime minister of Pakistan in a 1993 caretaker government.
- Yasir Nawaz (born 1970), director, producer, screenwriter and actor.
- Danish Nawaz (born 1978), television actor, director and comedian.
- Siraj Raisani (1963–2018), a member of Balochistan Awami Party. He is also a recipient of the Sitara-e-Shujaat (star of bravery).
- Mir Chakar Rind, (1468–1565), Baloch folk hero
- Asif Ali Zardari (born 1955), the 11th and 14th president of Pakistan.
- Sanaullah Khan Zehri (born 1961), the 15th chief minister of Balochistan.

== See also ==
- Baloch of Iran
- Baloch of Pakistan
  - Baloch people in Punjab
  - Baloch people in Sindh
- Baloch people in the United Arab Emirates
- Baloch of Turkmenistan
- Baloch of Oman
- Australian Baloch
- Baloch people in India
- Al Balushi
- Balochi cuisine
- Indo-Iranian peoples
- Baloch nationalism
- 1898 Baloch uprising
