= Oman–Turkey relations =

Bilateral relations between Oman and Turkey

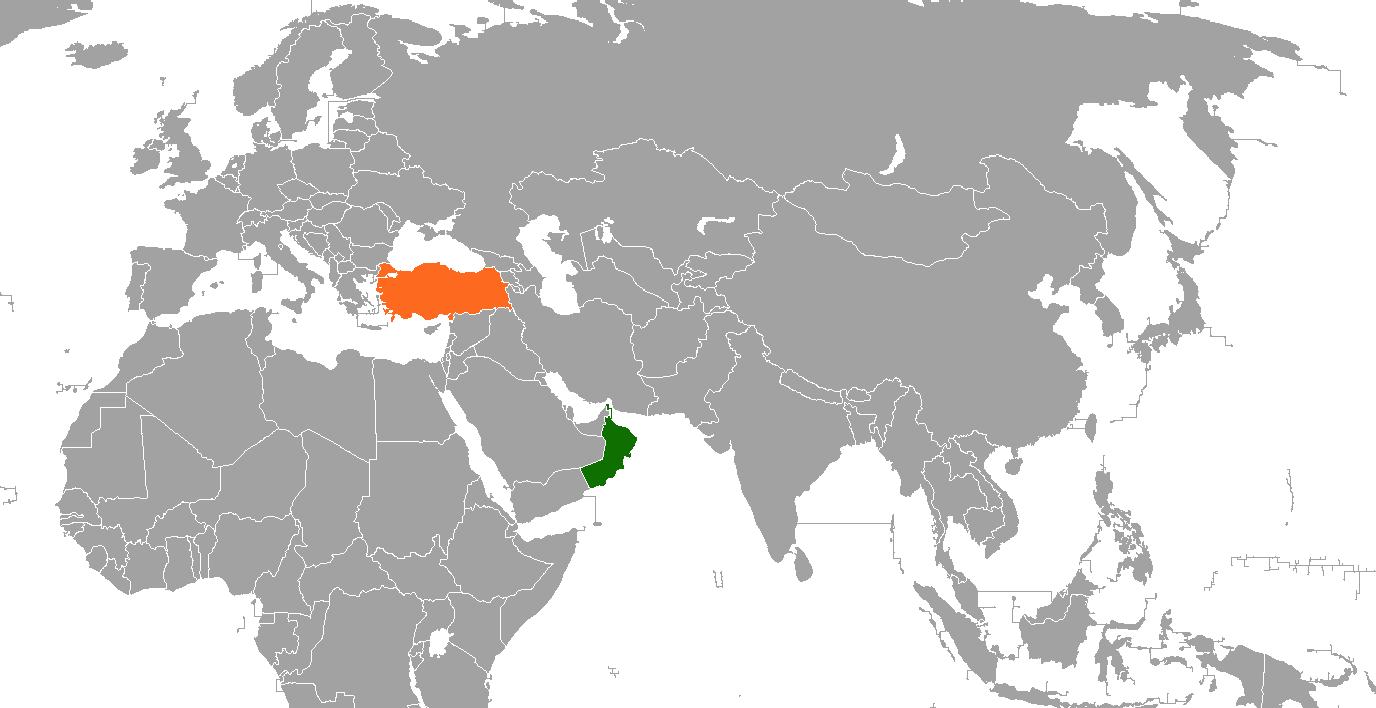

- Oman: Turkey

Diplomatic mission
- Omani Embassy, Ankara: Turkish Embassy, Muscat

Envoy
- Ambassador Qasım Mohamad Salim Al Salhi: Ambassador Ayşe Sözen Usluer

Oman–Turkey relations are the foreign relations between Oman and Turkey. Turkey's historic relationship with Oman has wavered between friendly indifference and courtship, but mutual differences were set aside in 2002 when the new Turkish government embraced a policy of engagement with Oman.

Turkey formally recognized Oman in 1970, which declared its independence the same year and diplomatic relations between the two countries were established in 1973. The two countries collaborated in their support for the 1979 Camp David Accords and were among the four majority-Muslim states that did not break relations with Egypt after the signing of the Egyptian-Israeli Peace Treaty in 1979.

Following the elimination of Iraq as a counterweight to Iran after the 2003 invasion of Iraq, the Gulf Cooperation Council (GCC), which includes Oman, has fostered stronger ties with Turkey in an attempt to enhance GCC security.

Recently, both countries have been the targets of hostile UAE spying:

- In December 2010, Oman discovered a spy network operated by the United Arab Emirates which collected information on Oman's military and government. They were reportedly interested in who would replace Qaboos as his heir and about Oman's relations with Iran.
- In 2019, it was reported that Project Raven, a UAE clandestine surveillance and hacking operation targeting other governments, militants, and human rights activists critical of the UAE monarchy, specifically targeted Oman and Turkey, succeeded in hacking a device belonging to Yusuf bin Alawi, the Omani Minister of Foreign Affairs.

== Historical background ==
Oman was controlled by the Seljuk Empire 1000-1054 and after a period of Portuguese colonization, Oman became part of the Ottoman Empire following the recapture of Muscat in 1552 where the Ottomans had obtained Omans allegiance to the porte, although the authority was only nominally acknowledged it was still recognized, up until 1698. This was done in order to counter Portuguese influence in the region, where it succeeded the Portuguese whom did not challenge Ottoman authority again in Oman, since the Turks also had expelled the Portuguese in 1552, and at last in 1581.

== Official visits ==
Guest	Host	Place of visit	Date of visit
(Turkey) Minister of Foreign Affairs Mevlüt Çavuşoğlu	Ministry of Foreign Affairs (Oman) Yusuf bin Alawi bin Abdullah	Al Alam Palace, Muscat	January 29, 2017
(Turkey) Minister of Foreign Affairs Mevlüt Çavuşoğlu	Ministry of Foreign Affairs (Oman) Yusuf bin Alawi bin Abdullah	Al Alam Palace, Muscat	October 28-29, 2017
Ministry of Foreign Affairs (Oman) Yusuf bin Alawi bin Abdullah	(Turkey) Minister of Foreign Affairs Mevlüt Çavuşoğlu	OIC Extraordinary Summit on Al-Quds, Istanbul	May 18, 2018
Sultan (Oman) Haitham bin Tariq	(Turkey) President Recep Tayyip Erdoğan	Ankara	November 28, 2024
(Turkey) President Recep Tayyip Erdoğan	Sultan (Oman) Haitham bin Tariq	Al Alam Palace, Muscat	October 22-13, 2025

== Economic relations ==
- Trade volume between the two countries was 489 million USD in 2018 (Turkish exports/imports: 422/67 million USD).

In 2024 the two countries signed a 10 year long contract gas deal. Oman agreed to supply Turkish company, Botas 1 million metric tons beginning in 2025.

== Cultural relations ==
Turkish television drama have become massively popular across in Oman, as a significant population halts daily activities to watch shows such as Hareem Al Sultan and Fatima, which according to the Atlantic promotes a positive image of Turkey in Oman.

== See also ==
- Foreign relations of Oman
- Foreign relations of Turkey
