= Omani passport =

Passport of Sultanate of Oman issued to Omani citizens

- Front cover of a contemporary Omani biometric passport
- Type: Passport
- Issued by: Oman Royal Oman Police
- First issued: 2014 (Biometric passport)
- Purpose: Identification
- Eligibility: Omani citizenship

The Omani passport (Arabic: جواز السفر العماني) are passports issued by Oman to Omani citizens for international travel. Omani passports are issued by the Royal Oman Police or at an Omani Embassy overseas.

== History ==
Oman started to issue biometric passports in 2014.

== Passport types ==
Passport types are specified under article No. 3 of the Omani passport law, issued by Royal Decree No. 69/97. The specified types are as follows:

- Ordinary passport (red cover)
- Diplomatic passport (black cover)
- Special passport (burgundy cover)
- Service passport (blue cover)
- The laissez-passer.

== Physical appearance ==
Omani passports' cover is red and have inscriptions in golden letters indicating the official name of the country at the top and the word "passport" at the bottom both in Arabic and English divided by the coat of arms. The biometric passport symbol, alerting to the presence of a RFID chip inside the document, is at the very bottom of the cover page.

=== Generic design ===
The Omani passport consists of 48 pages and is valid for up to 10 years.

=== Identity information page ===
The Omani passport identity page is in two languages - Arabic and English - and includes the following data:

- Passport holder's photo 4x6cm
- Type ("P" for Passport)
- Country (OMN for Oman)
- Passport Number
- Holder's Surname
- Holder's Given Names
- Nationality
- Date of Birth
- Date of Issue
- Date of Expiry
- ID Number
- Place of Birth
- Issuing Authority
- Passport Holder's Signature

== Visa requirements ==
As of 2025, Omani citizens had visa-free or visa on arrival access to 85 countries and territories, ranking the Omani passport 60th in the world according to the Henley Passport Index.

== See also ==
- Visa policy of Oman
- Visa requirements for Omani citizens
