= List of diplomatic missions in Oman =

This is a list of diplomatic missions in Oman. There are currently 60 embassies in Muscat and many countries maintain consulates in other Omani cities (not including honorary consulates).

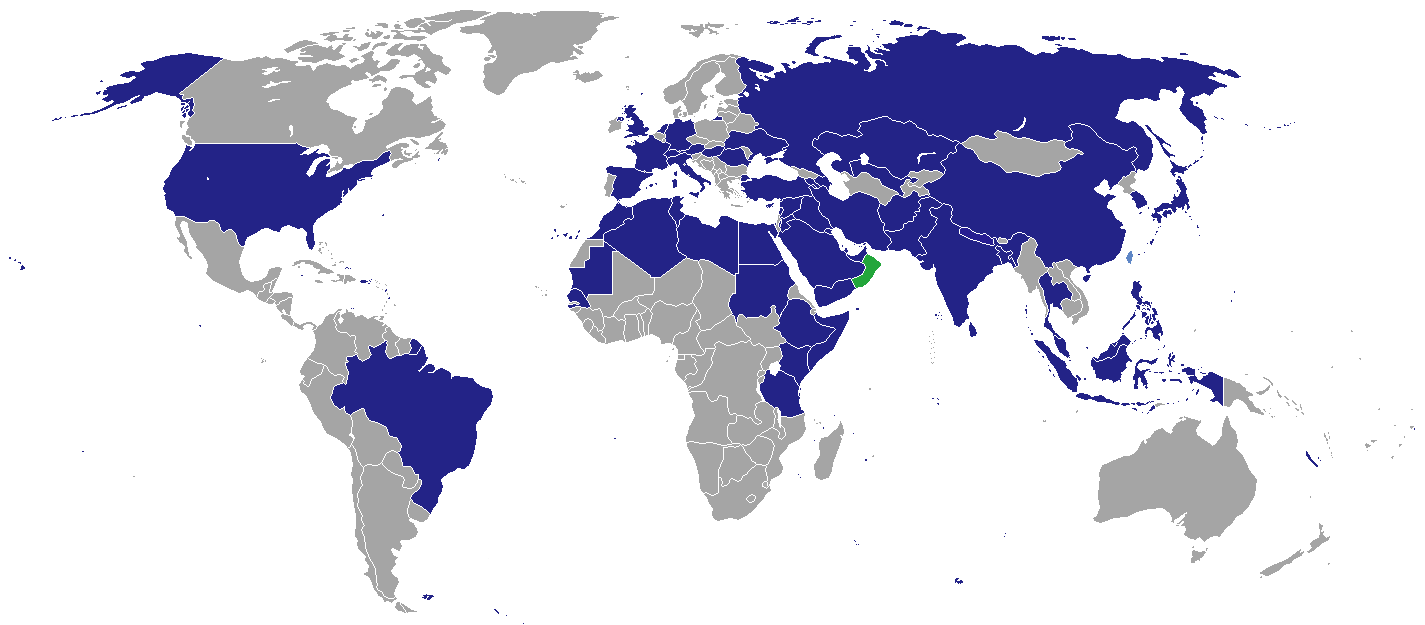
Map of diplomatic missions in Oman

== Embassies in Muscat ==
1. Afghanistan
2. Algeria
3. Armenia
4. Austria
5. Azerbaijan
6. Bahrain
7. Bangladesh
8. Brazil
9. Brunei
10. China
11. Cyprus
12. Egypt
13. Ethiopia
14. France
15. Germany
16. Hungary
17. India
18. Indonesia
19. Iran
20. Iraq
21. Italy
22. Japan
23. Jordan
24. Kazakhstan
25. Kenya
26. Kuwait
27. Lebanon
28. Libya
29. Malaysia
30. Mauritania
31. Morocco
32. Nepal
33. Netherlands
34. Pakistan
35. Palestine
36. Philippines
37. Qatar
38. Romania
39. Russia
40. Saudi Arabia
41. Senegal
42. Singapore
43. Somalia
44. South Korea
45. Spain
46. Sri Lanka
47. Sudan
48. Switzerland
49. Syria
50. Tajikistan
51. Tanzania
52. Thailand
53. Tunisia
54. Turkey
55. Ukraine
56. United Arab Emirates
57. United Kingdom
58. United States
59. Uzbekistan
60. Yemen

== Other posts in Muscat ==
- Northern Cyprus (Representative Office)
- Taiwan (Taipei Economic and Cultural Office)

== Non-resident embassies accredited to Oman ==
=== Resident in Abu Dhabi, United Arab Emirates ===
1. Fiji
2. Kyrgyzstan
3. North Macedonia
4. Seychelles

=== Resident in Cairo, Egypt ===
1. Belarus
2. Chile
3. Colombia
4. Estonia
5. Holy See
6. North Korea
7. Rwanda
8. Serbia
9. Slovakia
10. Slovenia
11. Zimbabwe

=== Resident in Doha, Qatar ===
1. Central African Republic
2. Croatia
3. Haiti
4. Panama
5. Paraguay

=== Resident in Kuwait City, Kuwait ===
1. Bhutan
2. Botswana
3. Cambodia
4. Laos
5. Malawi
6. Mongolia
7. Togo

=== Resident in London, United Kingdom ===
1. Dominica
2. Guatemala
3. Lithuania

=== Resident in Riyadh, Saudi Arabia ===
1. Albania
2. Angola
3. Argentina
4. Australia
5. Belgium
6. Benin
7. Bosnia and Herzegovina
8. Burkina Faso
9. Burundi
10. Cameroon
11. Canada
12. Comoros
13. Cuba
14. Czech Republic
15. Denmark
16. Djibouti
17. Dominican Republic
18. Eritrea
19. Equatorial Guinea
20. Finland
21. Gabon
22. Gambia
23. Georgia
24. Ghana
25. Greece
26. Guinea
27. Guinea-Bissau
28. Ireland
29. Ivory Coast
30. Madagascar
31. Maldives
32. Mali
33. Mauritius
34. Mexico
35. Myanmar
36. New Zealand
37. Niger
38. Nigeria
39. Norway
40. Peru
41. Poland
42. Portugal
43. Sierra Leone
44. Sweden
45. Turkmenistan
46. Uganda
47. Uruguay
48. Venezuela
49. Vietnam
50. Zambia

=== Resident in other cities ===
1. Iceland (Reykjavík)
2. Malta (Valletta)

== Closed missions ==
| Host city | Sending country | Mission | Year closed | Ref. |
|---|---|---|---|---|
| Muscat | Sweden | Embassy | 1993 | |
| Muscat | South Africa | Embassy | 2021 | |

== Missions to open ==
| Host city | Sending country | Mission | Ref. |
|---|---|---|---|
| Muscat | Belarus | Embassy | |
| Muscat | Belgium | Embassy | |
| Muscat | Botswana | Embassy | |
| Muscat | Bulgaria | Embassy | |
| Muscat | Czechia | Embassy | |
| Muscat | European Union | Delegation | |
| Muscat | Poland | Embassy | |
| Muscat | Rwanda | Embassy | |
| Muscat | Vietnam | Embassy | |

== See also ==
- Foreign relations of Oman
- Ministry of Foreign Affairs
- List of diplomatic missions of Oman
