= Badr bin Hamad Al Busaidi =

Omani diplomat

Sayyid Badr bin Hamad bin Hamood Al Busaidi
- بدر بن حمد بن حمود البوسعيدي
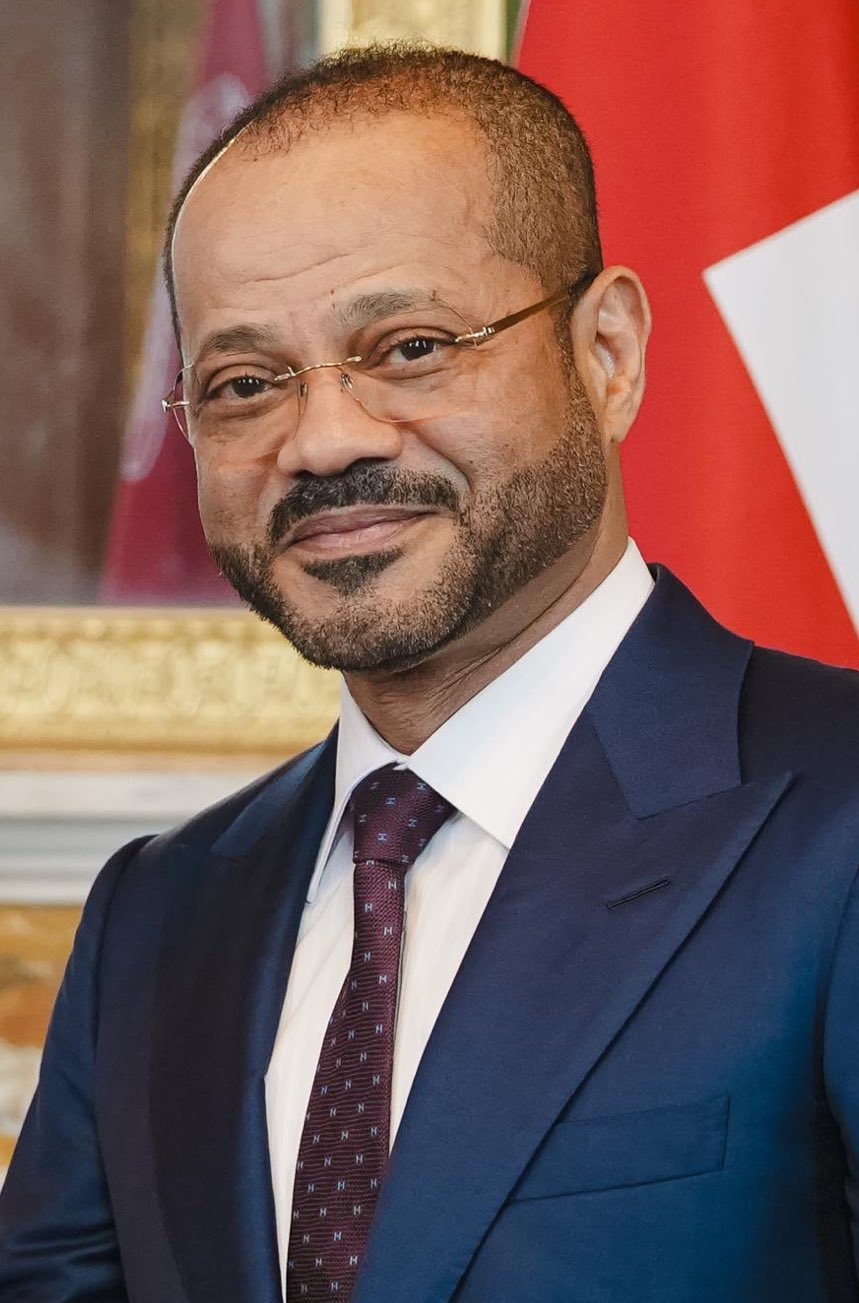
- Badr in 2026

Minister of Foreign Affairs of Oman
- Incumbent
- Assumed office 18 August 2020
- Monarch: Haitham bin Tariq
- Prime Minister: Haitham bin Tariq
- Preceded by: Yusuf bin Alawi bin Abdullah (as Minister Responsible for Foreign Affairs)

Personal details
- Born: 30 May 1960 (age 66) Muscat, Oman
- Spouse: Noora bint Abdullah bin Mahawish Al Daher (m. 1979; div. 1993)
- Children: 4
- Parents: Hamad bin Hamood Al Busaidi (father); Zawan (mother)

Sayyid Badr bin Hamad bin Hamood Al Busaidi (Arabic: بدر بن حمد بن حمود البوسعيدي; born 30 May 1960) is a member of the Omani royal family, a diplomat and politician who has been serving as the foreign minister of Oman since 18 August 2020. He has represented Oman in regional and international meetings, which include the United Nations.

== Personal life ==
=== Early life ===
Badr was born in Muscat on 30 May 1960. He is the second son of Hamad bin Hamood Al Busaidi, who worked under Sultan Said bin Taimur as his private secretary in the 1960s, and under Sultan Qaboos as Minister of Diwan (Royal Court) Affairs, managing the relations between the Sultan and the citizens, upon his succession in 1970 until 1986. From 1986 until his death in 2002, Hamad was the personal adviser to Sultan Qaboos.

=== Education ===
Al Busaidi received his early education in the Saideyya schools between Muscat and Salalah. He left for the United Kingdom in 1977 to pursue further education, where he spent his first months in Wales with a private tutor. He relocated to London in spring 1978 and worked with a team of tutors for three years. This education enabled Al Busaidi to gain the necessary grades in the British Secondary School Examinations to get admitted to University of Oxford, where he was awarded an M.Litt. in Politics, Philosophy and Economics (PPE) in 1986.

=== Family ===
In 1979, Al Busaidi Badr married Noora bint Abdullah bin Mahawish Al Daher, formerly a Saudi Arabian but now an Omani national. They divorced in 1993. Their children are:

- Nasr bin Badr bin Hamad Al Busaidi
- Asila bint Badr bin Hamad Al Busaidi
- Salsabeel bint Badr bin Hamad Al Busaidi
- Mazan bint Badr bin Hamad Al Busaidi

== Diplomatic career ==
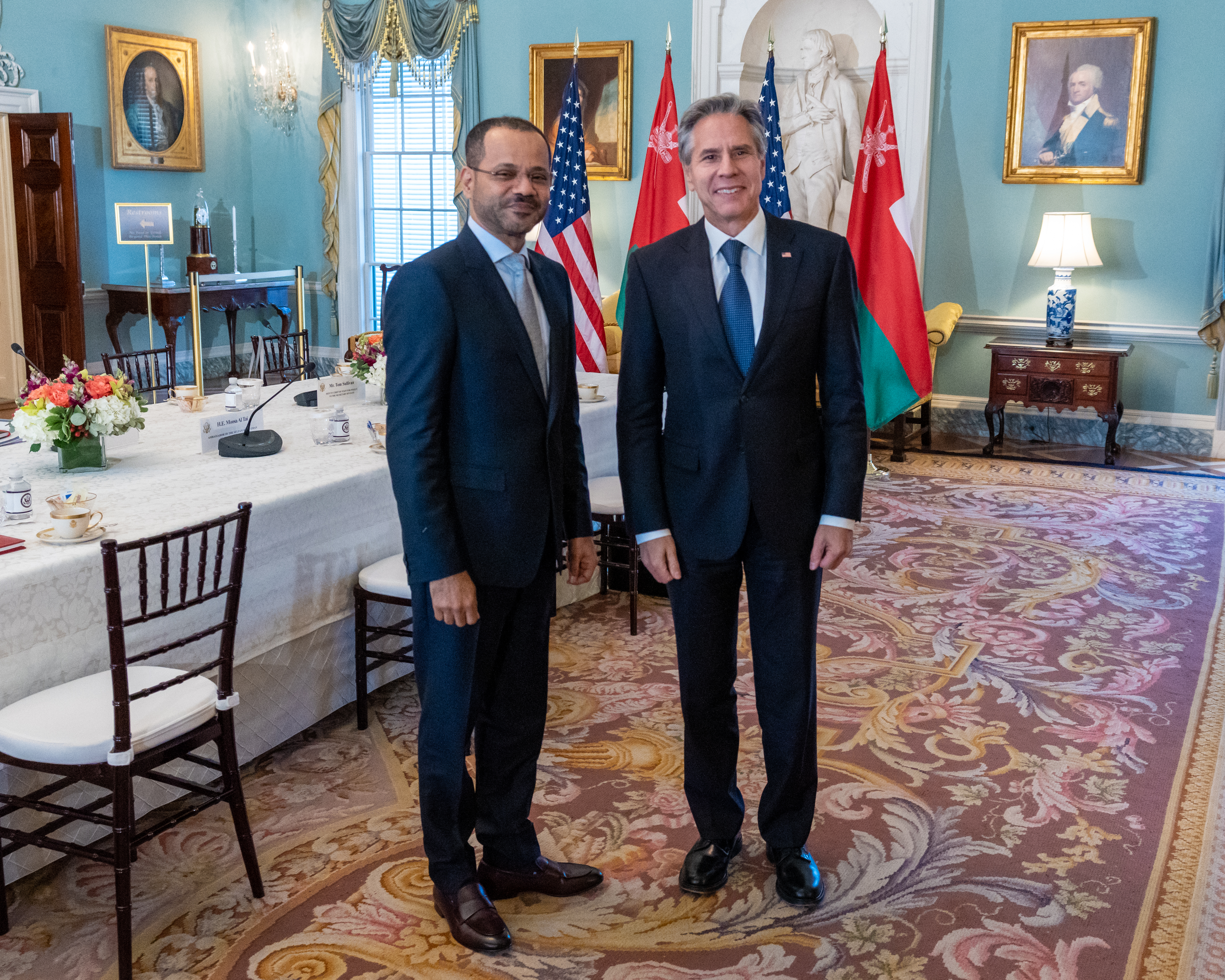
Al Busaidi with US Secretary of State Antony Blinken in 2022

Following Badr’s return to Muscat in 1988, he joined the Foreign Ministry as a diplomat. In 1989, he was appointed as the first secretary, and he established the Office of Political Analysis to provide systematic assessment and policy analysis of key international and regional issues. In 1990, he was promoted to councillor, and in 1996, he was promoted to ambassador. Al Busaidi was appointed as the head of the Minister's Office Department in 1997.

In 2000, he was promoted to undersecretary, and then became Secretary General of the Foreign Ministry in 2007. He was appointed as the Foreign Minister on 18 August 2020.

He led the initial negotiation with the United States concerning labour law issues, which began in 1993 and subsequently led to Omani membership of the World Trade Organisation in 2000, and to a US Omani Free Trade Agreement in 2006. He has also chaired the Omani side in many bilateral and multilateral meetings regionally and internationally.

In December 2025, he met Prince Faisal bin Farhan Al Saud in Riyadh to seek a political solution to the crisis in Yemen after a Saudi-led strike on Yemen's southern port of Mukalla, which raised tensions between Riyadh and the United Arab Emirates.

In late February 2026, Al Busaidi served as a key mediator between the United States and Iran in discussions around the latter's nuclear program. He met with US Vice President JD Vance, and gave an interview on CBS News claiming that a peace deal was "within reach". Analysts characterised this as a last-minute, and ultimately unsuccessful, attempt to prevent the 2026 Israeli–United States strikes on Iran, which began several hours after Al Busaidi's comments. After the United States and Israel attacked Iran, Al-Busaidi said that he was dismayed and that "active and serious negotiations" had been undermined while urging the United States to "not get sucked in further" into the conflict, adding "this is not your war." He also claimed that the United States had "lost control of its own foreign policy" and accused Israel of persuading the Trump administration to engage in a war with Iran, which he termed a "grave miscalculation" and a "catastrophe".

Al Busaidi has lectured in Oman and internationally on topics such as cultural dialogue, modernisation and development, and the writing of Omani history. He takes a keen personal interest in youth development, human rights and the advancement of women in public life, and he promotes cultural diplomacy, tolerance and mutual understanding.

== Institutional affiliation ==
- MEDRC Oman representative and Chairman of Executive Council (1996–present)
