= List of diplomatic missions of Oman =

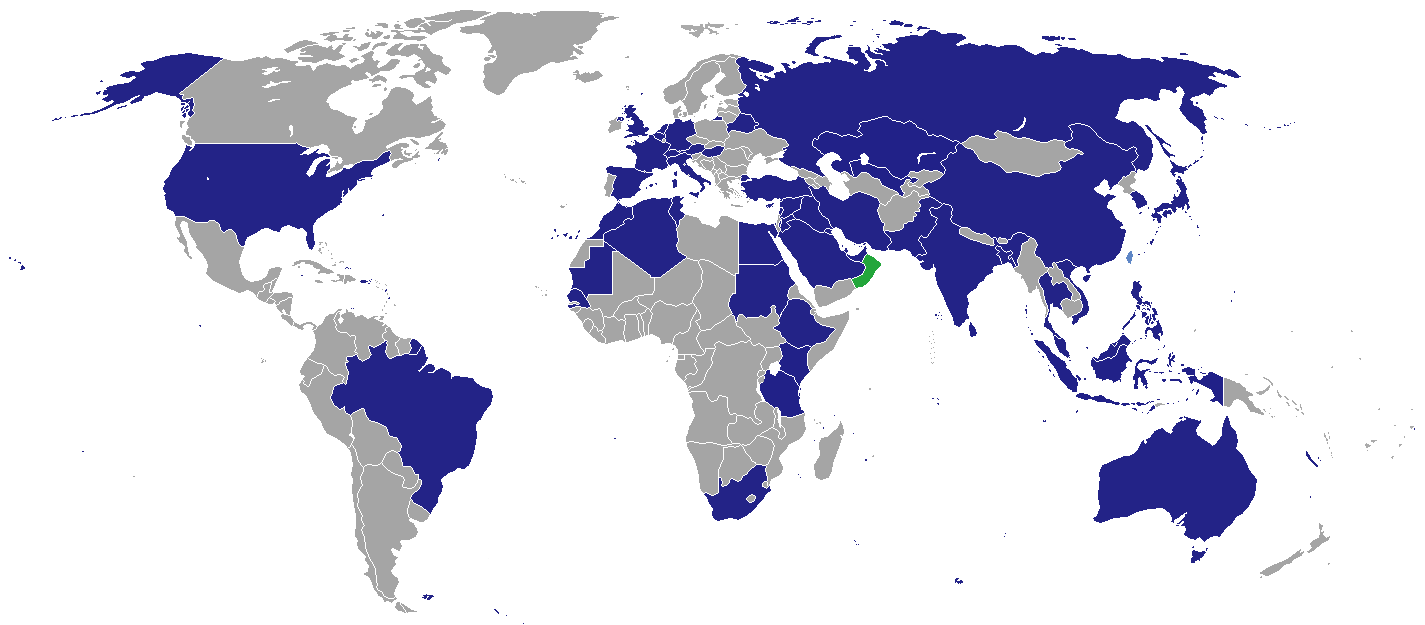
Sultanate of Oman Countries hosting an Omani embassy Countries hosting an Omani consular mission only or de facto embassy

This is a list of diplomatic missions of Sultanate of Oman

Of note, Oman is one of the few countries that has a resident embassy accredited to the State of Palestine, in Ramallah.

Excluded from this listing are honorary consulates and trade missions, with the exception of the commercial office in Taipei, which functions as a de facto embassy.

== Current missions ==
=== Africa ===
Host country	Host city	Mission	Concurrent accreditation	Ref.
Algeria	Algiers	Embassy	Countries: Burkina Faso; Ghana; Niger	
Egypt	Cairo	Embassy	Countries: Angola; Djibouti; Eritrea; International Organizations: Arab League	
Ethiopia	Addis Ababa	Embassy	International Organizations: African Union (Note: Accredited as an observer mission.)	
Kenya	Nairobi	Embassy	Countries: Malawi; Rwanda; Uganda; International Organizations: United Nations; United Nations Environment Programme; United Nations Human Settlements Programme	
Mauritania	Nouakchott	Embassy		
Morocco	Rabat	Embassy	Countries: Benin; Mali; Sierra Leone	
Senegal	Dakar	Embassy	Countries: Cape Verde; Equatorial Guinea; Gambia; Guinea; Guinea-Bissau; Ivory Coast	
Somalia	Mogadishu	Embassy		
South Africa	Pretoria	Embassy	Countries: Madagascar; Mauritius; Mozambique; Zimbabwe	
Sudan	Khartoum	Embassy	Countries: Chad; South Sudan	
Tanzania	Dar es Salaam	Embassy	Countries: Burundi; Comoros; Seychelles; Zambia	
Tanzania	Zanzibar City	Consulate-General	Countries: Burundi; Comoros; Seychelles; Zambia	
Tunisia	Tunis	Embassy	Countries: Libya	

=== Americas ===
Host country	Host city	Mission	Concurrent accreditation	Ref.
Brazil	Brasília	Embassy	Countries: Argentina; Bolivia; Chile; Colombia; Ecuador; Guatemala; Guyana; Paraguay; Peru; Suriname; Uruguay; Venezuela	
United States	Washington, D.C.	Embassy	Countries: Canada; Cuba; Dominican Republic; Mexico	

=== Asia ===
Host country	Host city	Mission	Concurrent accreditation	Ref.
Bahrain	Manama	Embassy		
Bangladesh	Dhaka	Embassy		
Brunei	Bandar Seri Begawan	Embassy		
China	Beijing	Embassy	Countries: Mongolia; North Korea	
India	New Delhi	Embassy	Countries: Afghanistan; Bhutan; Nepal	
India	Mumbai	Consulate-General	Countries: Afghanistan; Bhutan; Nepal	
Indonesia	Jakarta	Embassy	Countries: Fiji; International Organizations: Association of Southeast Asian Nations	
Iran	Tehran	Embassy	Countries: Tajikistan	
Iraq	Baghdad	Embassy		
Japan	Tokyo	Embassy	Countries: New Zealand	
Jordan	Amman	Embassy		
Kazakhstan	Astana	Embassy	Countries: Kyrgyzstan	
Kuwait	Kuwait City	Embassy		
Lebanon	Beirut	Embassy		
Malaysia	Kuala Lumpur	Embassy		
Pakistan	Islamabad	Embassy		
Pakistan	Karachi	Consulate-General		
Palestine	Ramallah	Embassy		
Philippines	Manila	Embassy		
Qatar	Doha	Embassy		
Republic of China (Taiwan)	Taipei	Commercial office		
Saudi Arabia	Riyadh	Embassy	Countries: Djibouti; International Organizations: Organisation of Islamic Cooperation	
Saudi Arabia	Jeddah	Consulate-General	Countries: Djibouti; International Organizations: Organisation of Islamic Cooperation	
Singapore	Singapore	Embassy		
South Korea	Seoul	Embassy		
Sri Lanka	Colombo	Embassy	Countries: Maldives	
Syria	Damascus	Embassy		
Thailand	Bangkok	Embassy		
Turkey	Ankara	Embassy	Countries: Azerbaijan; Georgia; Turkmenistan	
United Arab Emirates	Abu Dhabi	Embassy		
Uzbekistan	Tashkent	Embassy		
Vietnam	Hanoi	Embassy	Countries: Cambodia; Laos; Myanmar	

=== Europe ===
Host country	Host city	Mission	Concurrent accreditation	Ref.
Austria	Vienna	Embassy	Countries: Bulgaria; Croatia; Czechia; Slovakia; Slovenia; International Organizations: United Nations; International Atomic Energy Agency; UNIDO; UNODC	
Belarus	Minsk	Embassy		
Belgium	Brussels	Embassy	International Organizations: European Union	
Cyprus	Nicosia	Embassy		
France	Paris	Embassy	Countries: Monaco; Portugal	
Germany	Berlin	Embassy	Countries: Denmark; Finland; Norway; Poland; Sweden; Ukraine	
Hungary	Budapest	Embassy	Countries: Moldova	
Italy	Rome	Embassy	Countries: Albania; Bosnia and Herzegovina; Greece; Malta; Romania; San Marino; International Organizations: Food and Agriculture Organization; International Fund for Agricultural Development; World Food Programme	
Netherlands	The Hague	Embassy	Countries: Luxembourg; International Organizations: OPCW	
Russia	Moscow	Embassy	Countries: Armenia; Serbia	
Spain	Madrid	Embassy	Countries: Andorra; International Organizations: World Tourism Organization	
Switzerland	Bern	Embassy	Countries: Holy See; Liechtenstein	
United Kingdom	London	Embassy	Countries: Estonia; Iceland; Ireland; Latvia; Lithuania; Montenegro	

=== Oceania ===
Host country	Host city	Mission	Concurrent accreditation	Ref.
Australia	Canberra	Embassy		

=== Multilateral organizations ===
Organization	Host city	Host country	Mission	Ref.
United Nations	New York City	United States	Permanent Mission	
United Nations	Geneva	Switzerland	Permanent Mission	
UNESCO	Paris	France	Permanent Mission	

== Gallery ==
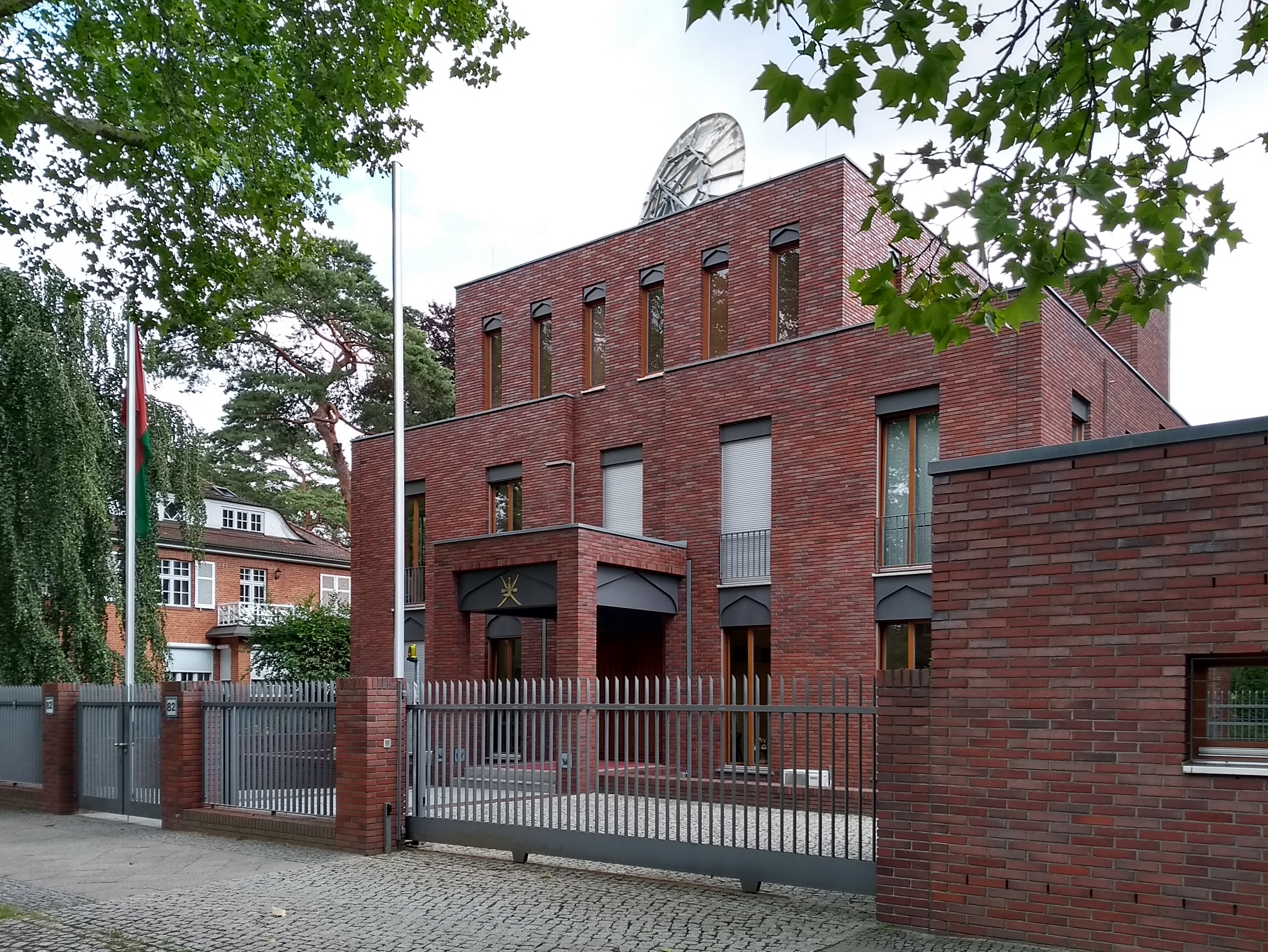
Embassy in Berlin

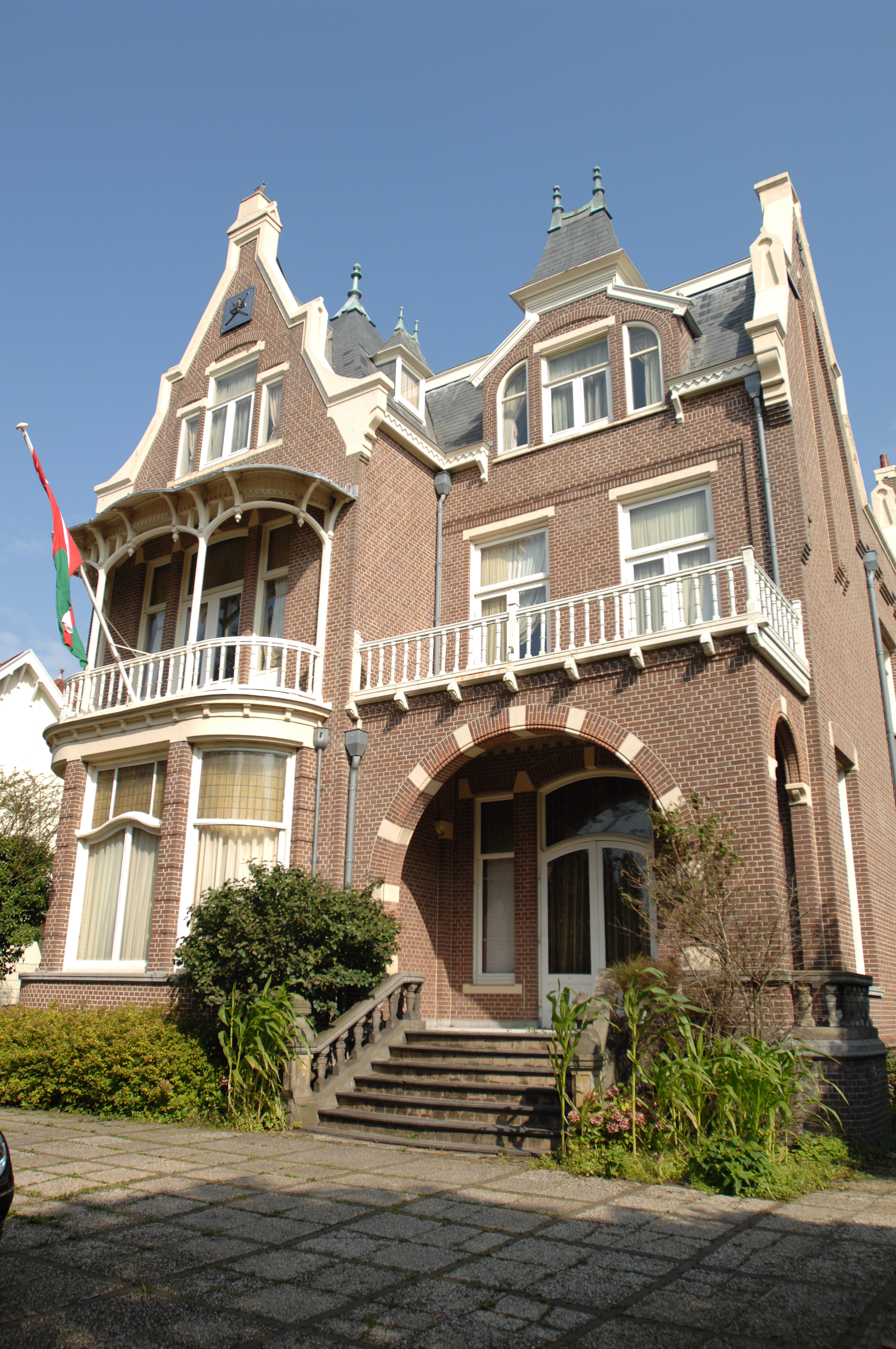
Embassy in The Hague

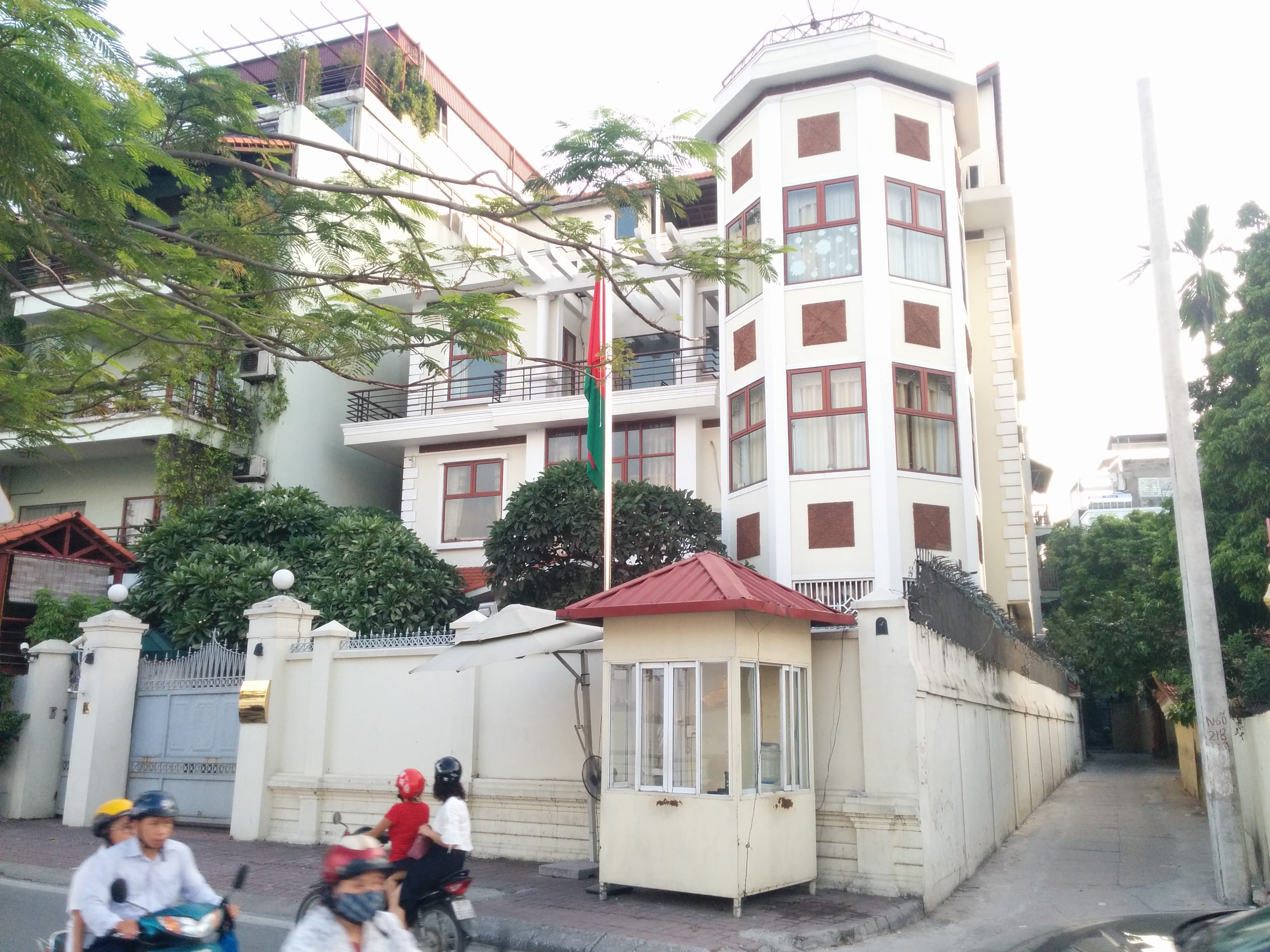
Embassy in Hanoi

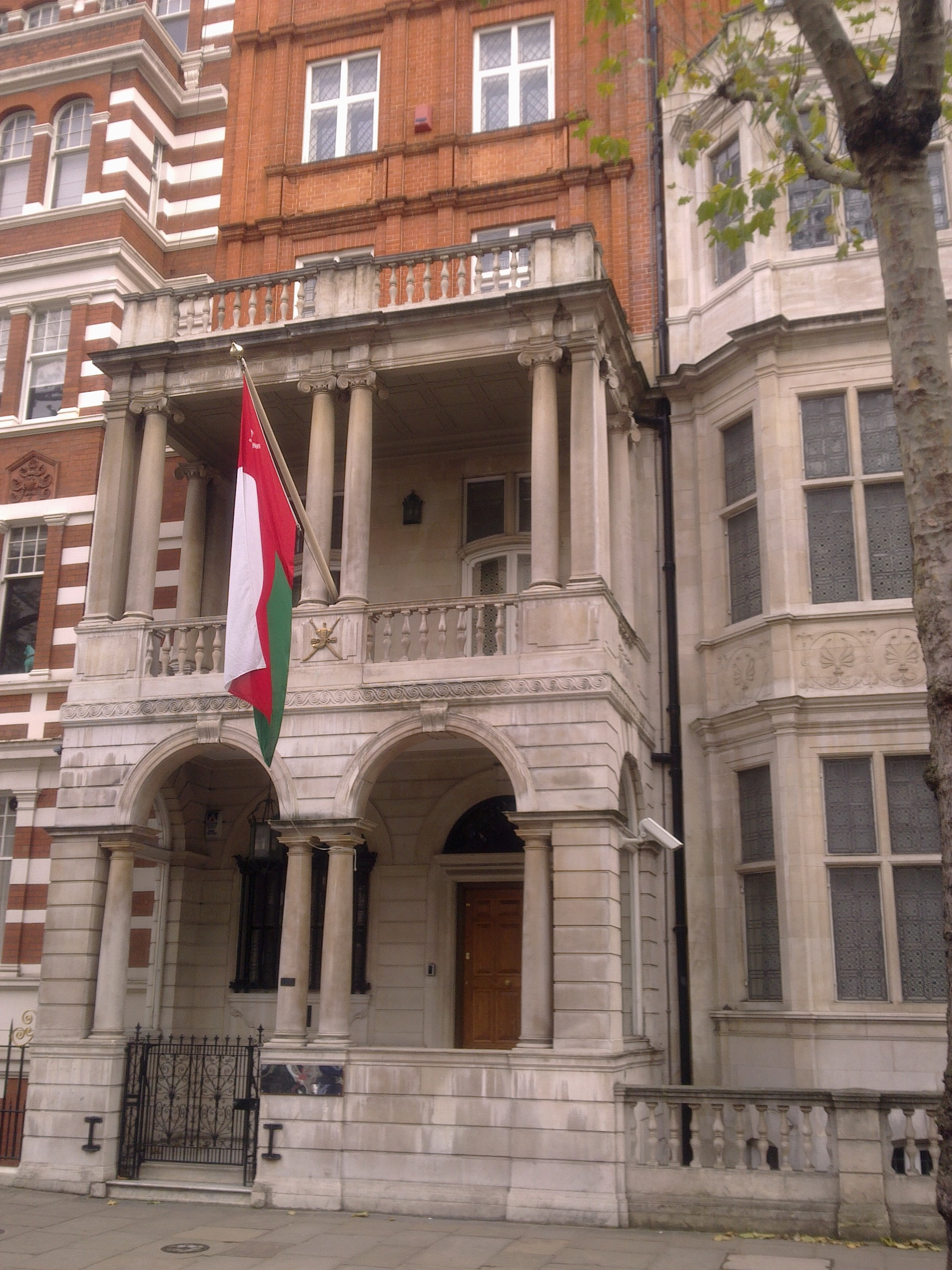
Embassy in London

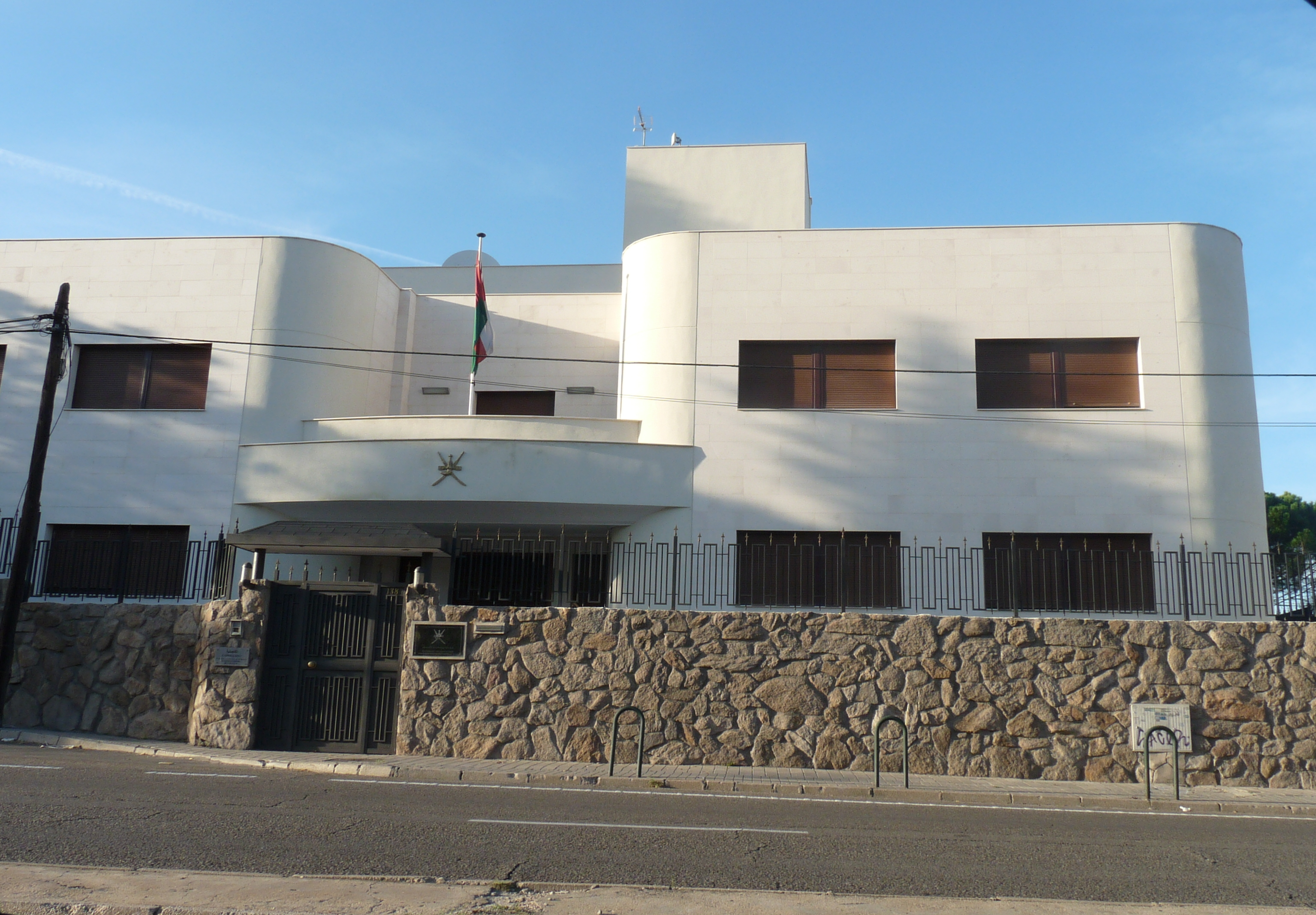
Embassy in Madrid

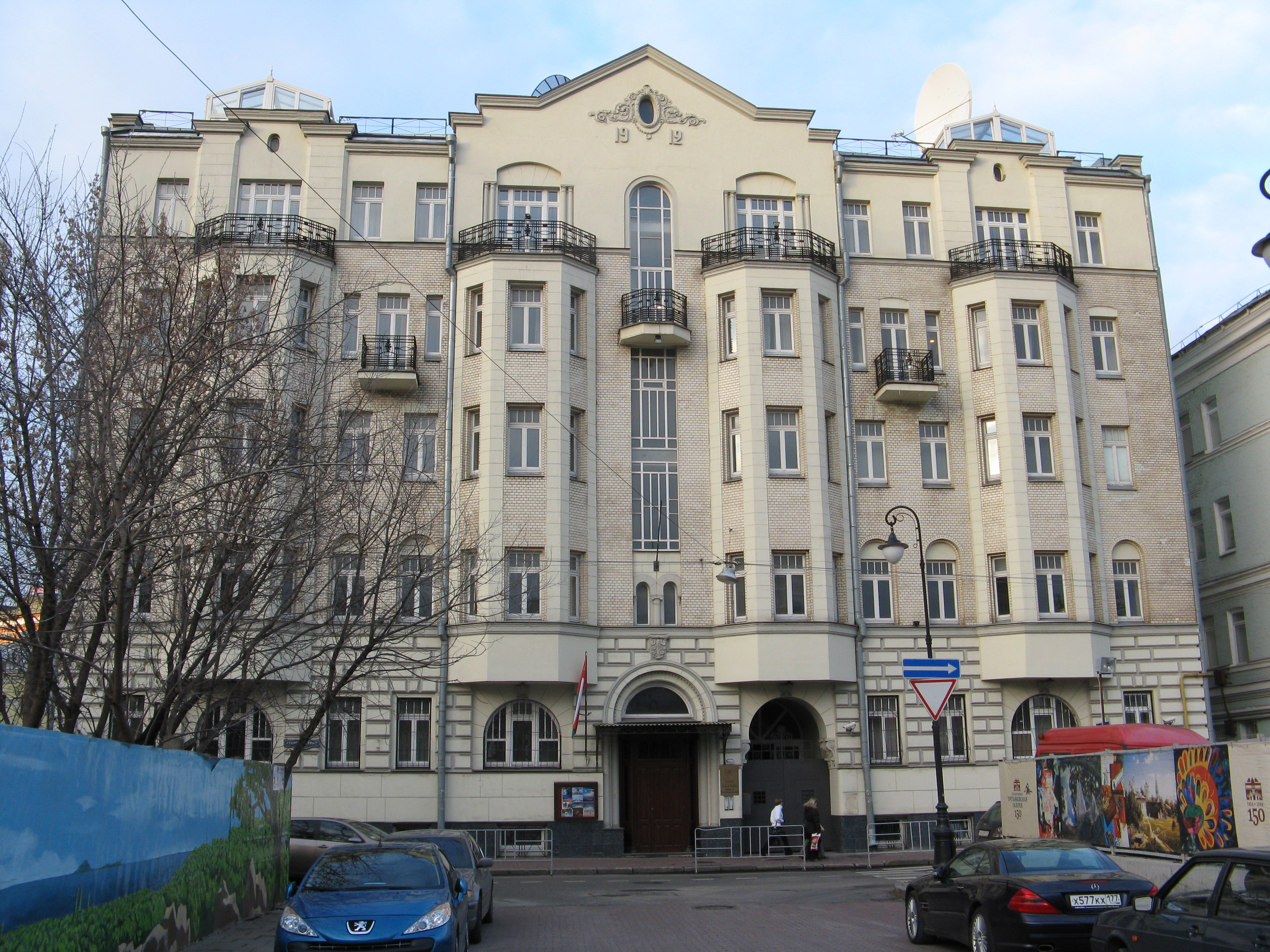
Embassy in Moscow

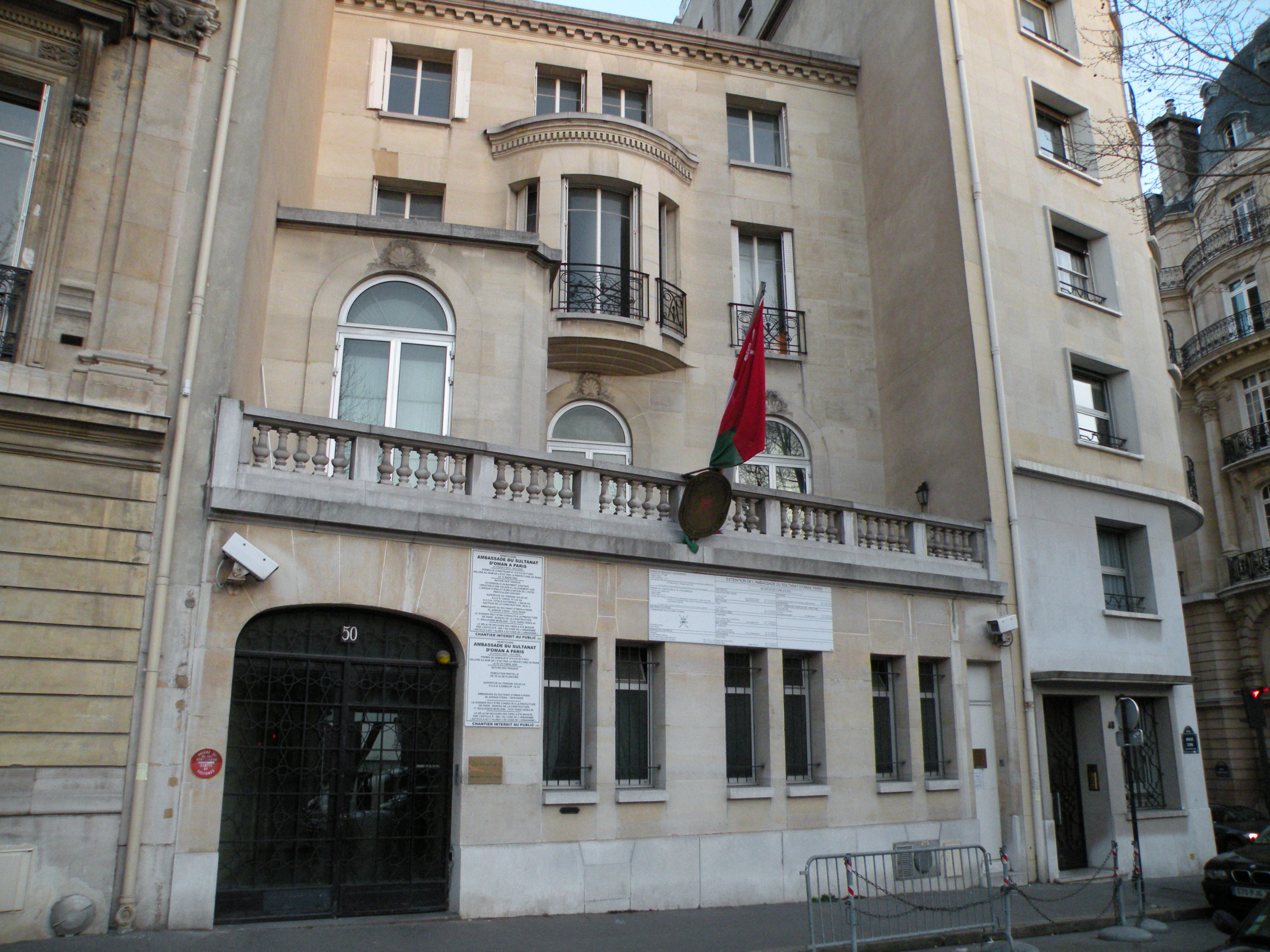
Embassy in Paris

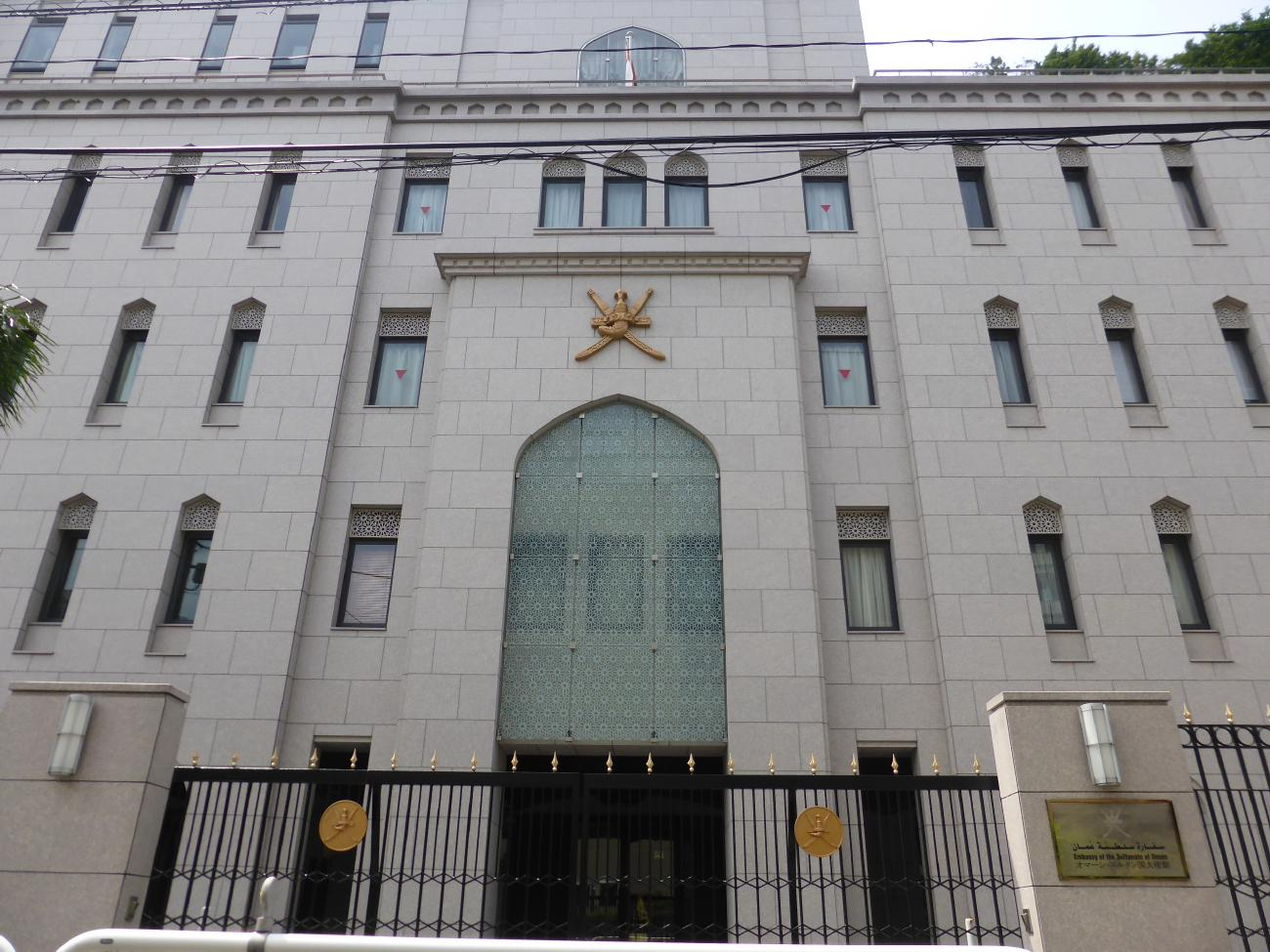
Embassy in Tokyo

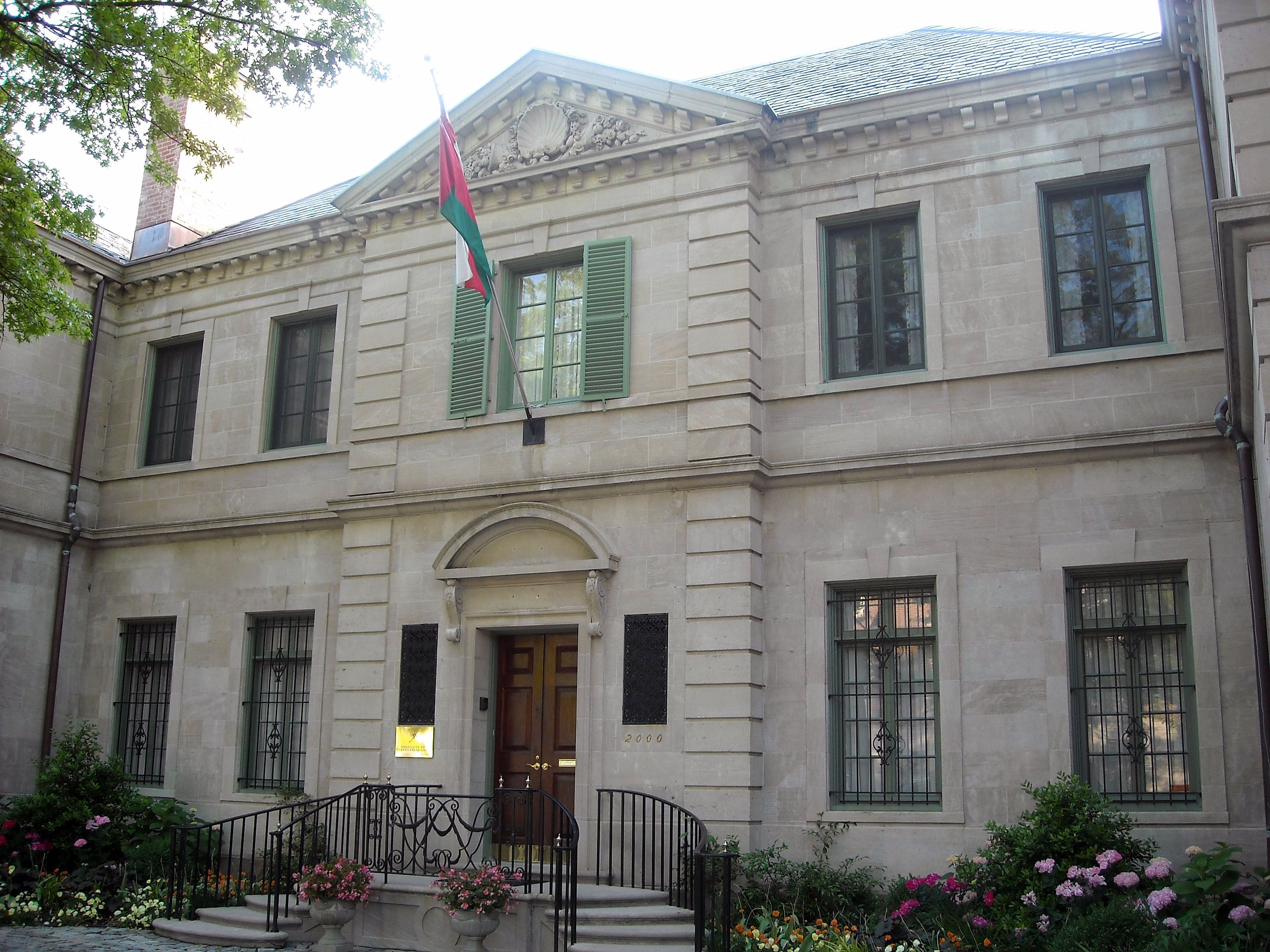
Embassy in Washington, D.C.

== Closed missions ==
=== Africa ===
Host country	Host city	Mission	Year closed	Ref.
Libya	Tripoli	Embassy (Note: To be reopened.)	2014	

=== Asia ===
Host country	Host city	Mission	Year closed	Ref.
Yemen	Sana'a	Embassy	Unknown	
Yemen	Aden	Consulate-General	Unknown	

=== Oceania ===
Host country	Host city	Mission	Year closed	Ref.
Australia	Melbourne	Consulate-General	2023	

== Mission to open ==
Host country	Host city	Mission	Ref.
Romania	Bucharest	Embassy	
Rwanda	Kigali	Embassy	

== See also ==
- Ministry of Foreign Affairs (Oman)
- Foreign relations of Oman
- List of diplomatic missions in Oman
- Visa policy of Oman
