= Foreign Ministry (Oman) =

Government ministry of the Sultanate of Oman

Coordinates: 23.616373°N 58.468809°E

Ministry of Foreign Affairs
- وزارة الخارجية

Ministry overview
- Formed: 1970; 56 years ago
- Jurisdiction: Government of Oman
- Headquarters: Al Kharjiyah Street, Muscat, Sultanate of Oman
- Minister responsible: Badr bin Hamad Al Busaidi, Minister of Foreign Affairs
- Website: fm.gov.om

The Foreign Ministry (Arabic: وزارة الخارجية) is the government body in the Sultanate of Oman responsible for organising and directing Oman's relations with other countries and with regional and international organisations.

The current Foreign Minister is Badr bin Hamad Al Busaidi. He was appointed on 18 August 2020.

== Foreign policy ==
The Foreign Ministry strives to maintain good relations with all countries through dialogue, cooperation and mutual respect. The Foreign Ministry enables Oman to play an active part in a regional community of nations living in harmony and build relationships which assure security and stability while fostering the economic growth and cultural development essential to all states' futures.

The mission of the Foreign Ministry, as set out in the Basic Statute of the State (Oman's constitution), rests on certain key principles:

- To preserve and protect the Sultanate and maintain its independence and sovereignty.
- To reaffirm ties of friendship and strengthen the bonds of cooperation with all peoples and all nations on the basis of mutual respect, mutual benefit and non-interference in internal affairs.
- To respect international conventions and regional treaties and to recognise the rule of law internationally.

More generally, the Foreign Ministry strives to develop and strengthen the Sultanate's foreign relations in line with the directives of His Majesty the Sultan and His Majesty's Government.

Oman's representation in international organisations includes the Arab League, the United Nations, the Indian Ocean Rim Association for Regional Cooperation, the Organisation of Islamic Cooperation, the Middle East Desalination Research Centre and the Gulf Cooperation Council.

== History ==
When Sultan Qaboos bin Said Al Said assumed power in 1970, Oman had limited formal agreements with the outside world, including neighbouring Arab states. The new Sultan launched Oman on a new path of modernisation and progress, which included the establishment of the Foreign Ministry (in its current form) in 1970.

Since the Foreign Ministry's establishment, Oman has pursued a moderate foreign policy and expanded its diplomatic relations dramatically. It supported the 1978 Camp David Accords and was one of three Arab League states, along with Somalia and Sudan, which did not break relations with Egypt after the signing of the Egyptian-Israeli Peace Treaty in 1979. During the Persian Gulf crisis, Oman assisted the United Nations coalition effort. Oman has developed close ties to its neighbors; it joined the six-member Gulf Cooperation Council when it was established in 1981.

Oman has traditionally supported Middle East peace initiatives, as it did the Oslo Accords in 1993 and subsequently the Arab Peace Initiative from 2002. Oman was also an active member of the Madrid Conference of 1991. In April 1994, Oman hosted the plenary meeting of the Water Resources Working Group, which formed part of the peace process efforts. Oman became the first Persian Gulf state to host a meeting and the first Gulf state to receive an Israeli Prime Minister (Yitzhak Rabin). Oman was instrumental in establishing the Middle East Desalination Research Centre in 1996 and the MEDRC headquarters are in Muscat. MEDRC aims to address two of the greatest global grand challenges: peace and environmental sustainability.

During the Cold War period, Oman avoided relations with communist countries because of the communist support for the insurgency in Dhofar.

In recent years, Oman has undertaken diplomatic initiatives in the Central Asian republics, including in Kazakhstan, where it was involved in a joint oil pipeline project from 1992 to 2008. In addition, Oman maintains good relations with Iran, its northern neighbour, and the two countries regularly exchange delegations. During strained relations between Iran and the US (among other countries), Oman facilitate dialogue by hosting talks between leaders. After the JCPOA was agreed in 2015, US Secretary of State John Kerry praised Oman's role, saying Oman "not only hosted a number of important meetings, but also played a critical role in getting these talks off the ground in the first place".

Although Oman enjoys a high degree of internal stability, regional tensions in the aftermath of the Persian Gulf War and the Iran-Iraq war continue to necessitate large defence expenditures. In 2015, Oman budgeted $9.9 billion for defence. Oman maintains a small but professional and effective military, supplied mainly with British equipment in addition to items from the United States, France, and other countries. British officers, on loan or on contract to the Sultanate, help staff the armed forces, although a programme of "Omanization" has steadily increased the proportion of Omani officers over the past several years.

When war broke out in Yemen, Oman's Foreign Ministry offered its service as a facilitator in the search for peace.

During the Qatar diplomatic crisis, which began in June 2017 and saw a rift between Qatar and a Saudi-led coalition, Oman remained neutral and maintained friendly relations with both sides. Omani ports were used to reroute cargo bound for Qatar when these ships were boycotted by most of Qatar's other neighbours. The rift caused a crisis for the Gulf Cooperation Council, with members Bahrain, the UAE and Saudi Arabia severing diplomatic and economic ties with Qatar. The diplomatic crisis was resolved in January 2021 during a GCC summit.

Prior to the establishment of the Foreign Ministry in 1970, Oman had few formal agreements with other countries, although its strategic location on the edge of the Arabian Peninsula and flourishing maritime trade routes meant Oman had close commercial and cultural links across the Indian Ocean. In 1800, Oman and the United Kingdom signed a treaty which established their special relationship and permitted the UK close involvement in Oman's civil and military affairs. In 1833, Oman signed a treaty of friendship and commerce with a trade representative of the United States.

== Territorial disputes ==
A dispute arose in 1977-78 between the United Arab Emirates and Oman following the discovery of oil at the countries' borders. The northern boundaries, around Ras Al Khaimah and the Musandam Peninsula, were settled in 1979. Relations between the two states warmed in the 1980s-90s, resulting in a border agreement for the southern section of the frontier in 1999, followed by a complete border delimitation ratified in Abu Dhabi on 22 June 2002.

After North and South Yemen merged in May 1990, Oman settled its border disputes with the new Republic of Yemen on 1 October 1992. The two neighbors have cooperative bilateral relations. Oman also reached border agreements with Saudi Arabia in the 1990s, and now Oman's borders with all neighbors are demarcated.

== Responsibilities ==
The Foreign Ministry is responsible for cultivating the Sultanate's diplomatic relations and managing all of its foreign affairs.

The Foreign Ministry is charged with building strong, friendly relations with countries and organisations across the world. It strives to serve the cause of international peace, security and economic development, by encouraging countries to resolve disputes through peaceful means based on constructive cooperation and understanding.

It participates actively in bilateral and multilateral meetings and organisations, providing instructions and authority to Omani delegates to take part in international conferences and ratify international conventions, in accordance with procedures determined by law.

The responsibilities of the Ministry of Foreign Affairs are specified in Article No. 4 of the law structuring of the ministry, issued by Royal Decree No. 32/2008, and include the following:

- Establishing diplomatic relations with the rest of the world, monitoring international events and developing Oman's political stance in relation to regional and global events.
- Evaluating Oman's relations with other countries and with international organisations.
- Coordinating with other ministries and institutions to develop technical and economic relations with other countries, promoting foreign investments and export development.
- Promoting dialogue between countries and dissolve disputes using peaceful methods.
- Carrying out legal procedures to ratify international treaties.

== Composition ==
The Sultan of Oman concurrently served as minister of foreign affairs until August 2020, when Sayyid Badr bin Hamad Al Busaidi was appointed by Sultan Haitham bin Tariq.

Until August 2020, there were additionally ministers responsible for foreign affairs:

- Sayyid Fahd bin Mahmoud al Said (1971–1979)
- Qais Bin Abdul Munim Al Zawawi (1979–1995)
- Yusuf bin Alawi bin Abdullah (1997–2020)

A secretary general with the rank of a minister also reported to the foreign minister during this period:

- Sultan Haitham bin Tariq Al Said (1994–2002)
- Sayyid Badr bin Hamad Al Busaidi (2007–2020)

== Undersecretaries ==
Undersecretaries report to the secretary-general of the Foreign Ministry. The Ministry currently has two undersecretaries, one for diplomatic affairs and another for administrative and financial affairs. The follows are the names of the undersecretaries appointed at the Foreign Ministry:

- Saif Hammad Albattashi - Undersecretary for Finance and Service (1986–1994)
- Sayyid Haitham bin Tarik Al Said - Undersecretary for Political Affairs (1986–1994)
- Ahmed Yousuf Alharthy - Undersecretary for Diplomatic Affairs (2009–2019)
- Sheikh Khalifa Alharthy - Undersecretary for Diplomatic Affairs (2019–present)
- Mohammed Yousuf Alzarafi - Undersecretary for Administrative and Financial Affairs (2009–2020)
- Mohammed Alwahaibi - Undersecretary for Administrative and Financial Affairs (2020–present)

== Bilateral relations ==
=== Brunei ===
Brunei has an embassy in Muscat, and Oman has an embassy in Bandar Seri Begawan. Relations were established on 24 March 1984. Both countries were former protectorates of European powers, such as the British for Brunei and the Portuguese for Oman, and both are now governed by Islamic absolute monarchies.

=== Egypt ===
Oman was the only Arab state besides Sudan under Jaafar Nimeiry to maintain good relations with Anwar al Sadat after Egypt recognized Israel. An NGO which launched a probe into foreign funding of organizations in Egypt found that Oman, along with the United Arab Emirates, donated $14.1 million to the Mohamed Alaa Mubarak institute, which was named after Hosni Mubarak's grandson.

=== India ===
India has an embassy in Muscat, Oman. The Indian consulate was opened in Muscat in February 1955 and five years later it was upgraded to a consulate general and later developed into a full-fledged embassy in 1971. The first ambassador of India arrived in Muscat in 1973. Oman established its embassy in New Delhi in 1972 and a consulate general in Mumbai in 1976.

=== Kosovo ===
On 4 February 2011, Oman recognized the Republic of Kosovo as independent and sovereign country. On 20 September 2011, the recognition was reconfirmed following a meeting between government leaders of Kosovo and Oman.

=== Malaysia ===
Malaysia and Oman established diplomatic relations in 1983. Since that, bilateral trade between Malaysia and Oman stood at nearly RM500 million during January–October 2010, with Malaysia's main exports to Oman being edible oil, machinery, appliances and parts, wood products, electrical and electronic products.

=== Pakistan ===
The relationship between Islamabad and Muscat is warm, because Oman is the nearest Arab country to Pakistan and the fact that some 30% of Omanis are of Balochi origin from Pakistan's Balochistan province, having settled in Oman over a hundred years ago. Before 1958, Gwadar was part of Oman but was transferred to Pakistan that year.

=== Russia ===
Russia has an embassy in Muscat. Oman is represented in Russia through its embassy in Moscow. Both Oman and Russia had established diplomatic relations of February 5, 1986 and still maintain mostly friendly relations.

=== United Arab Emirates ===
In December 2010, Oman discovered a spy network operated by the United Arab Emirates which collected information on Oman's military and government. They were reportedly interested in who would succeed Sultan Qaboos and about Oman's relations with Iran. Kuwait mediated in the dispute.

=== United Kingdom ===
Relations between the United Kingdom and Oman are strong and strategic. In April 2010 the government of Oman stated that it wanted to buy Eurofighter Typhoons from the UK. The United Kingdom has an embassy in Mina al Fahal in Muscat, and Oman has an embassy in London.

The Dhofar Rebellion was launched in the province of Dhofar against the Sultanate of Muscat and Oman and United Kingdom from 1962 to 1975. It ended with intervention of Iranian Imperial Forces and defeat of the rebels, but the state of Oman had to be radically reformed and modernised to cope with the campaign.

Queen Elizabeth II visited Oman in November 2010 to commemorate Oman's 40th National Day and take part in the tremendous celebrations in the country. This was her second visit to the Sultanate (first being in 1979). A few weeks before her 2010 visit, Oman was ranked the most improved nation in the past 40 years (1970-2010) by the UNDP.

=== United States ===
In 1974 and April 1983, Sultan Qaboos of Oman made state visits to the United States. Vice President George H. Bush visited Oman in 1984 and 1986, and President Bill Clinton visited briefly in March 2000. Vice President Dick Cheney visited Oman in 2002, 2005, 2006, and 2008. In March 2005, the U.S. and Oman launched negotiations on a Free Trade Agreement that were successfully concluded in October 2005. The FTA was signed on January 19, 2006. Oman has an embassy in Washington DC and United States has an embassy in Muscat.

== See also ==
- Iran–Oman relations
- List of diplomatic missions in Oman
- List of diplomatic missions of Oman
- Territorial disputes in the Persian Gulf
- Omani Foreign Ministry
- Foreign relations of Oman
