= Visa policy of Oman =

Policy on permits required to enter Oman

Visitors to Oman must obtain a visa from one of the Omani diplomatic missions unless they are citizens from one of the visa-exempt countries or citizens eligible for an e-Visa.

All visitors must hold a passport valid for at least 6 months.

In an effort to bolster the tourism sector, citizens from 103 countries are allowed to enter the sultanate for up to 14 days without securing a prior visa.

== Visa policy map ==
Visa policy of Oman Oman Freedom of movement Visa not required (90 days) Visa not required (30 days) Visa not required (14 days) Visa not required (14 days) if holding a valid Australian, Canadian, Japanese, Schengen, UK or US visa, or a residence permit issued by any GCC member state; otherwise, visa required Visa required Admission refused

== Visa exemption ==
=== Ordinary passports ===
Citizens of the following countries and territories may enter Oman without a visa for the following period:

Freedom of movement

- Bahrain
- Kuwait
- Qatar
- Saudi Arabia
- United Arab Emirates

90 days

- New Zealand

30 days

- Belarus^{1}
- Brunei
- Kazakhstan
- Russia^{1}
- Turkey

14 days^{#}

- All European Union member states

- Albania
- Andorra
- Argentina
- Armenia
- Australia
- Bolivia
- Bosnia and Herzegovina
- Brazil
- Canada
- Chile
- China^{2}
- Colombia
- Ecuador
- Georgia
- Hong Kong^{2}
- Iceland
- Indonesia
- Iran
- Japan
- Lebanon
- Liechtenstein
- Macau^{2}
- Malaysia
- Moldova
- Monaco
- North Macedonia
- Norway
- Paraguay
- Philippines
- San Marino
- Serbia
- Seychelles
- Singapore
- South Africa
- South Korea
- Suriname
- Switzerland
- Taiwan
- Thailand
- Ukraine
- United Kingdom
- United States
- Uruguay
- Uzbekistan
- Vatican City
- Venezuela

_{# - Must present proof of a confirmed hotel reservation, health insurance, a return ticket, and proof of funds for the duration of the stay.}
_{1 - No more than 90 days within any 1 calendar year.}
_{2 - For Chinese citizens with People's Republic of China passports, Hong Kong Special Administrative Region passports or Macao Special Administrative Region passports only.}

=== Substitute visa ===
Citizens of the following countries may enter Oman without a visa for up to 14 days under certain conditions:

- Algeria
- Azerbaijan
- Bhutan
- Costa Rica
- Cuba
- Egypt
- El Salvador
- Guatemala
- Honduras
- India
- Jordan
- Kyrgyzstan
- Laos
- Maldives
- Mauritania
- Mexico
- Morocco
- Nicaragua
- Panama
- Peru
- Tajikistan
- Tunisia
- Turkmenistan
- Vietnam

They must meet one of the following conditions:

- Hold a valid visa issued by any Schengen Area member state, Australia, Canada, Japan, the United Kingdom or the United States;
- Reside in one of GCC member state and its profession are among the professions that benefit from the resident visa.

=== Non-ordinary passports ===
Holders of diplomatic, official / service passports of Albania, Bangladesh, Belarus (30 days), Brunei (30 days), China (30 days), Colombia (30 days), Cyprus, Ecuador, Egypt (30 days), Germany, Iran (30 days), Japan, Jordan, Kazakhstan (30 days), Lebanon (30 days), Morocco (30 days), Portugal, Romania, Russia, Singapore (30 days), South Korea, Switzerland, Syria (30 days) and Venezuela may enter Oman without a visa for up to 90 days (unless otherwise noted).

=== Future changes ===
Oman has signed visa exemption agreements with the following countries, but they have not yet been ratified:

Country	Passports	Agreement signed on
Pakistan	Diplomatic, official, service, special	14 October 2026
Philippines	Diplomatic, official	14 July 2025
Maldives	Diplomatic, official, service, special	11 December 2024
Suriname	Diplomatic, official	September 2024
Uzbekistan	Diplomatic, official/ Ordinary	June 2024/ November 2026
China	Ordinary	29 March 2021

== Electronic visa (e-Visa) ==
Citizens of the following countries and territories, may obtain a single or multiple entry e-Visa valid for 30 days online.

- All European Union member states

- Albania
- Andorra
- Argentina
- Armenia
- Australia
- Belarus
- Bolivia
- Bosnia and Herzegovina
- Brazil
- Brunei^{1}
- Canada
- Chile
- China
- Colombia
- Ecuador
- Georgia
- Hong Kong
- Iceland
- Indonesia
- Iran
- Japan
- Kazakhstan
- Lebanon
- Liechtenstein
- Malaysia
- Moldova
- Monaco
- New Zealand
- North Macedonia
- Norway
- Paraguay
- Russia
- San Marino
- Serbia
- Seychelles
- Singapore
- South Africa
- South Korea^{1}
- Suriname
- Switzerland
- Taiwan
- Thailand
- Turkey
- Ukraine
- United Kingdom
- United States
- Uruguay
- Uzbekistan
- Vatican City
- Venezuela

_{1 - Issued free of charge.}
_{2 - Valid for 3 months.}

=== Conditional e-Visa ===
Citizens of the following countries, including their spouses and children of another nationality, may obtain an e-Visa, if they hold a valid Australian, Canadian, Japanese, Schengen, UK or US visa, or a residence permit issued by any Schengen Area member state, Australia, Canada, Japan, the United Kingdom or the United States.

They may apply for a single-entry visa (5 OMR for 10 days or 20 OMR 30 days), or 1-year-valid multiple-entry visa (for 50 OMR). The allowed duration of stay is 10 days for 10 days visa and 30 days for other visas (or 30 days per visit on the multiple-entry visa).

- Azerbaijan
- Bhutan
- Costa Rica
- Cuba
- El Salvador
- Guatemala
- Honduras
- India
- Kyrgyzstan
- Laos
- Maldives
- Mexico
- Morocco^{1}
- Nicaragua
- Panama
- Peru
- Tajikistan
- Turkmenistan
- Vietnam

_{1 - For Moroccan citizens, only a valid Schengen Visa issued in Morocco is applicable.}

== Transit without visa ==
Visitors from any country who hold onward tickets may transit through Oman without a visa for up to 6 hours if proceeding by the same flight.

== See also ==
- Visa requirements for Omani citizens
