= Yusuf bin Alawi =

Omani politician (born 1945)

Yusuf bin Alawi bin Abdullah
- يوسف بن علوي بن عبد الله
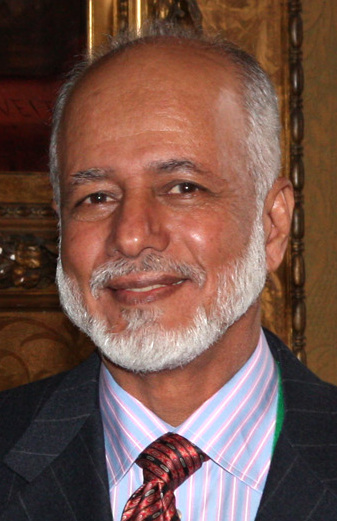
- Alawi in 2013

Minister Responsible for Foreign Affairs
- In office 1997 – 18 August 2020
- Monarchs: Qaboos bin Said; Haitham bin Tariq
- Prime Minister: Qaboos bin Said; Haitham bin Tariq
- Preceded by: Qais Bin Abdul Munim Al Zawawi
- Succeeded by: Badr bin Hamad Al Busaidi (as Minister of Foreign Affairs)

Personal details
- Born: 1945 (age 80–81) Salalah, Oman

Yusuf bin Alawi bin Abdullah (Arabic: يوسف بن علوي بن عبد الله, born 1945) is an Omani politician. He was the Sultanate of Oman's third Minister Responsible for Foreign Affairs. The "Minister in Responsibility" was previously appointed as the Sultan was intended to hold the official position of "Minister of Foreign Affairs" himself.

== Early life ==
Alawi studied and worked in Kuwait. In 1970, he met Sultan Qaboos for the first time, shortly after his take-over. He had been a dissident and associated with the Dhofar Liberation Front against the former Sultan, Said bin Taimur. However, once Sultan Qaboos acceded power, he encouraged Omani dissidents to come out of overseas exile and assist in the rebuilding of Oman. In the period between 1973 and 1974 Alawi occupied an ambassador role in Beirut.

== Career ==
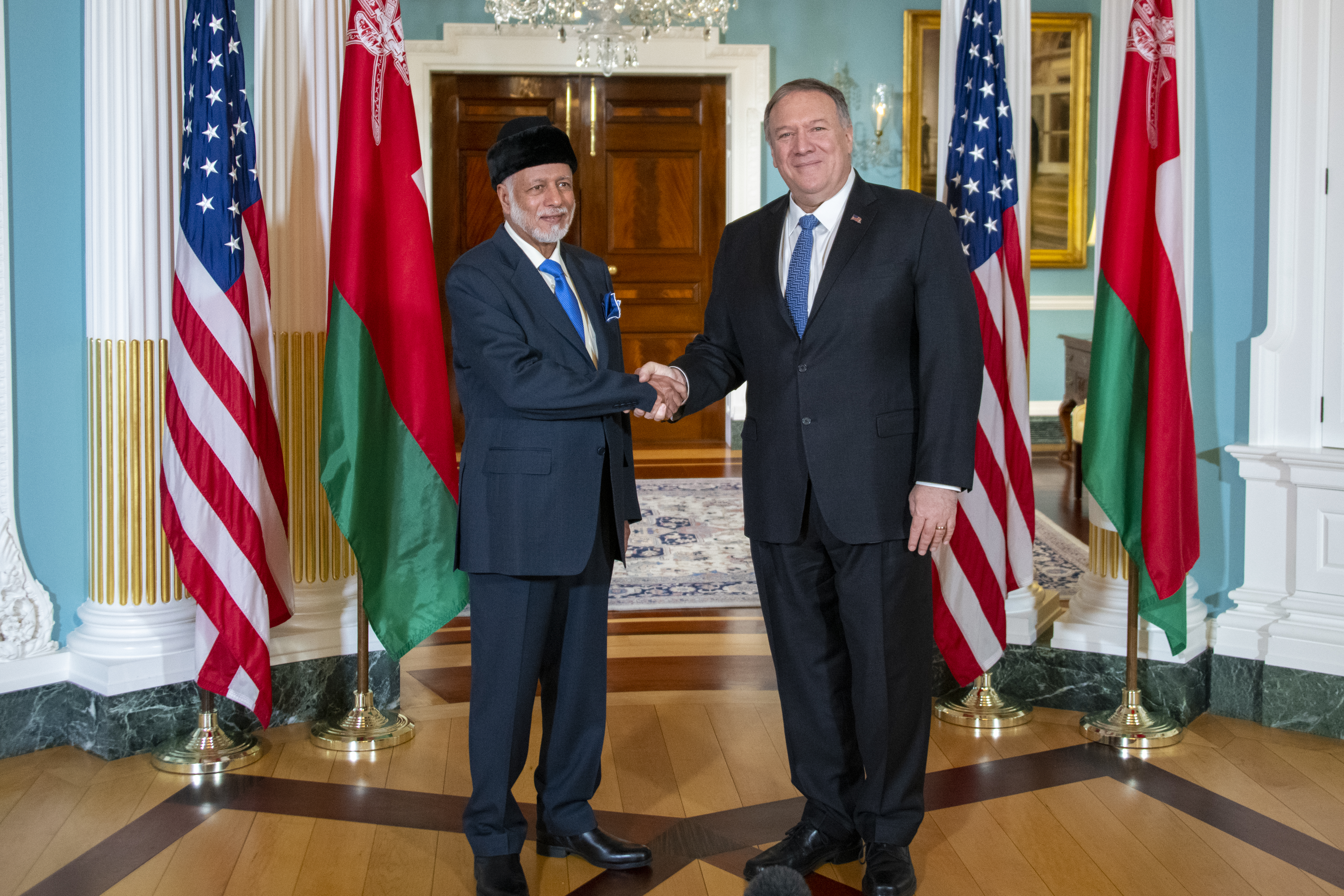
Alawi meets with U.S. Secretary of State Mike Pompeo at the U.S. Department of State in Washington, D.C., on November 25, 2019.

He was appointed as the Minister Responsible for Foreign Affairs in 1997 by Royal Decree No. 85/97 and was replaced on 18 August 2020 with Badr bin Hamad Al Busaidi (actioned by Royal Decree No. 111/2020) as part of a significant government restructure under Qaboos's successor, Sultan Haitham bin Tariq.

In 2019, Alawi met with the U.S. Secretary of State Michael R. Pompeo in Washington, D.C. to discuss ways to better engage with Iran. Oman is unusual among Arab states of the Persian Gulf in that it has a long history of cordial relations with Tehran, something Washington is keen to make use of in resolving a number of regional security issues.

In September 2016, Oman played an important role in securing the release of Homa Hoodfar, an Iranian-Canadian citizen and professor at Concordia University. She had been held prisoner in Iran's Evin Prison since 6 June 2016. This happened soon after a secretive meeting between Canada's prime minister, Justin Trudeau, and Alawi.

== Hacking ==
In 2019, it was revealed that Alawi had been targeted by Project Raven; a UAE clandestine surveillance and hacking operation targeting other governments, militants and human rights activists critical of the UAE monarchy. Using a "sophisticated spying tool called Karma", they managed to hack a device belonging to Alawi.

== Honours ==
- Sultan Haitham bin Tarik honoured Alawi with the highest civilian award (Royal Commendation Order – First Class) for his contributions to Oman.

=== Foreign honour ===
- Japan: Grand Cordon of the Order of the Rising Sun (10 May 2022).

== See also ==
- Foreign Ministry (Oman)
- List of foreign ministers in 2017
