= Hamidiyeh (disambiguation) =

Hamidiyeh is a city in Khuzestan Province, Iran.

Hamidiyeh (Persian: حميديه) may also refer to:

- Hamidiyeh, East Azerbaijan
- Hamidiyeh, Isfahan
- Hamidiyeh, Kerman
- Hamidiyeh, Zarand, Kerman Province
- Hamidiyeh, Dasht-e Azadegan, Khuzestan Province
- Hamidiyeh, Hoveyzeh, Khuzestan Province
- Hamidiyeh, Markazi
- Hamidiyeh, Mehdishahr, Semnan Province
- Hamidiyeh District, in Khuzestan Province

== See also ==
- Hamidiyah
- Hamidiye (disambiguation)
