= Al-Hamidiyah (disambiguation) =

Al-Hamidiyah (الحميدية) is a town in Syria.

Al-Hamidiyah or variant spellings may also refer to the following places:

- Al-Hamidiyya, a Palestinian village depopulated in 1948
- Al Hamidiyah, Ajman, in the United Arab Emirates
- Al-Hamidiya IDP Camp in Zalingei, Central Darfur, Sudan
- Al-Hamidiyah Souq, in Damascus, Syria
- Hamidiyya Higher Secondary School, in Ilaiyangudi, Tamil Nadu, India

== See also ==
- Hamidiye (disambiguation)
- Hamidiyeh (disambiguation)
- Abdul Hamid II, Ottoman Sultan
- Hamidiya, a city in Central District, Yazd County, Yazd Province, Iran
- El Hawamdeya, a city in the Giza Governorate of Egypt
