= Hamidi (disambiguation) =

Hamidi is a surname.

Hamidi may also refer to one of the following places:

- Hamidi, Barnala district, India
- Hamidi, Isfahan, Iran
- Hamidi, Khuzestan, Iran
- Hamid Raza Khan, 20th-century Indian Islamic scholar, commemorated in Urs-e-Hamidi

== See also ==
- Hamid, a male given name from Arabic
- Hamidiye (disambiguation)
- Hamidiyah
- Hamidiyeh
