= List of settlements in Ajman =

This is a list of settlements in Ajman.

- Ajman (city)
- Al Hamidiyah (Ajman)
- Hadhf
- Manama (Ajman)
- Masfout
- Al Zahya (Ajman)*Al Heilio (Ajman)*Emirates City (Ajman)*Al Zaheya Gardens (Ajman)
