= Wadi Al Khulaiban =

Wadi in UAE

Wadi Al Khulaiban Wadi Al Khileban
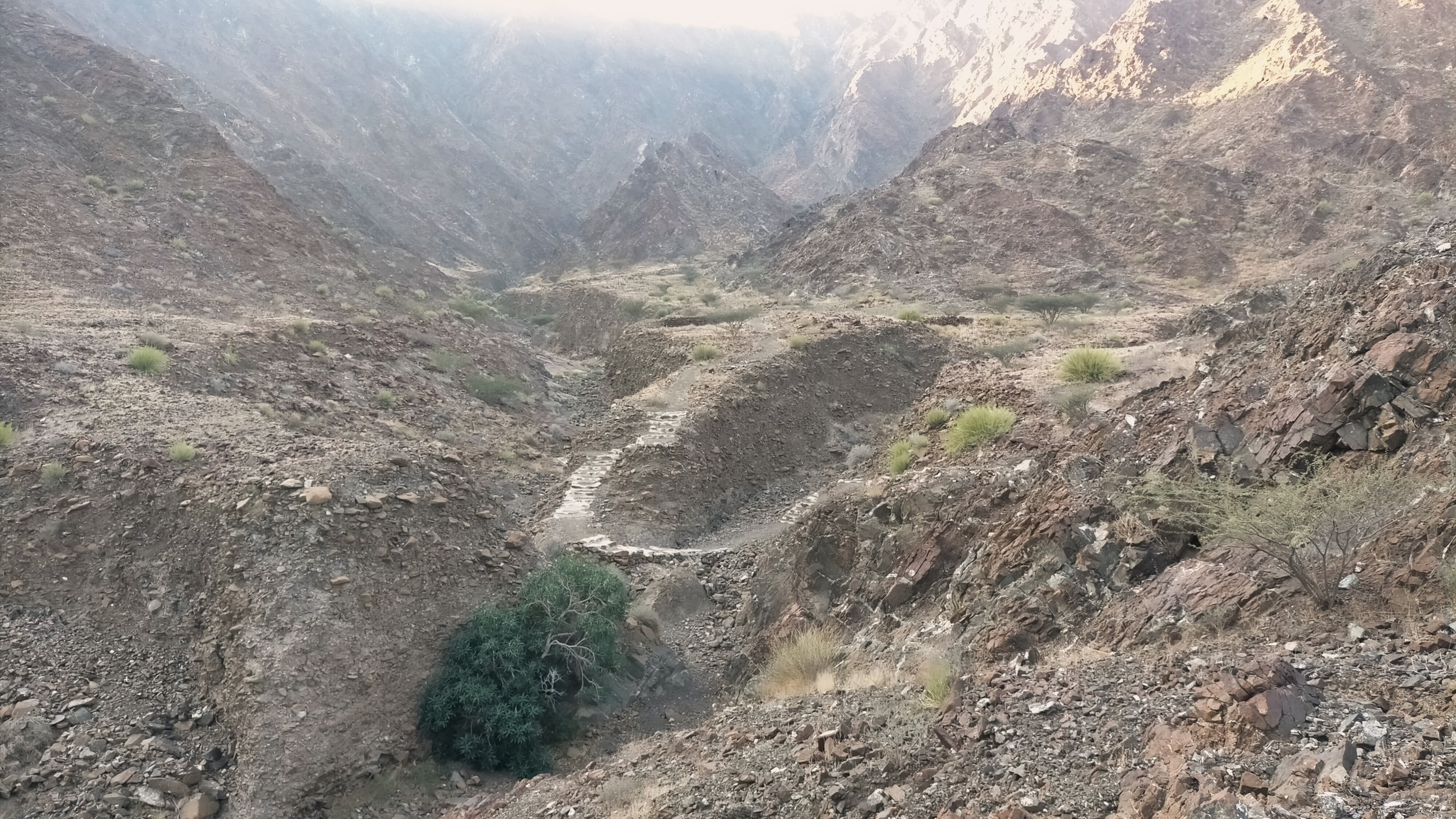
- Small gorge of Wadi Al Khulaiban

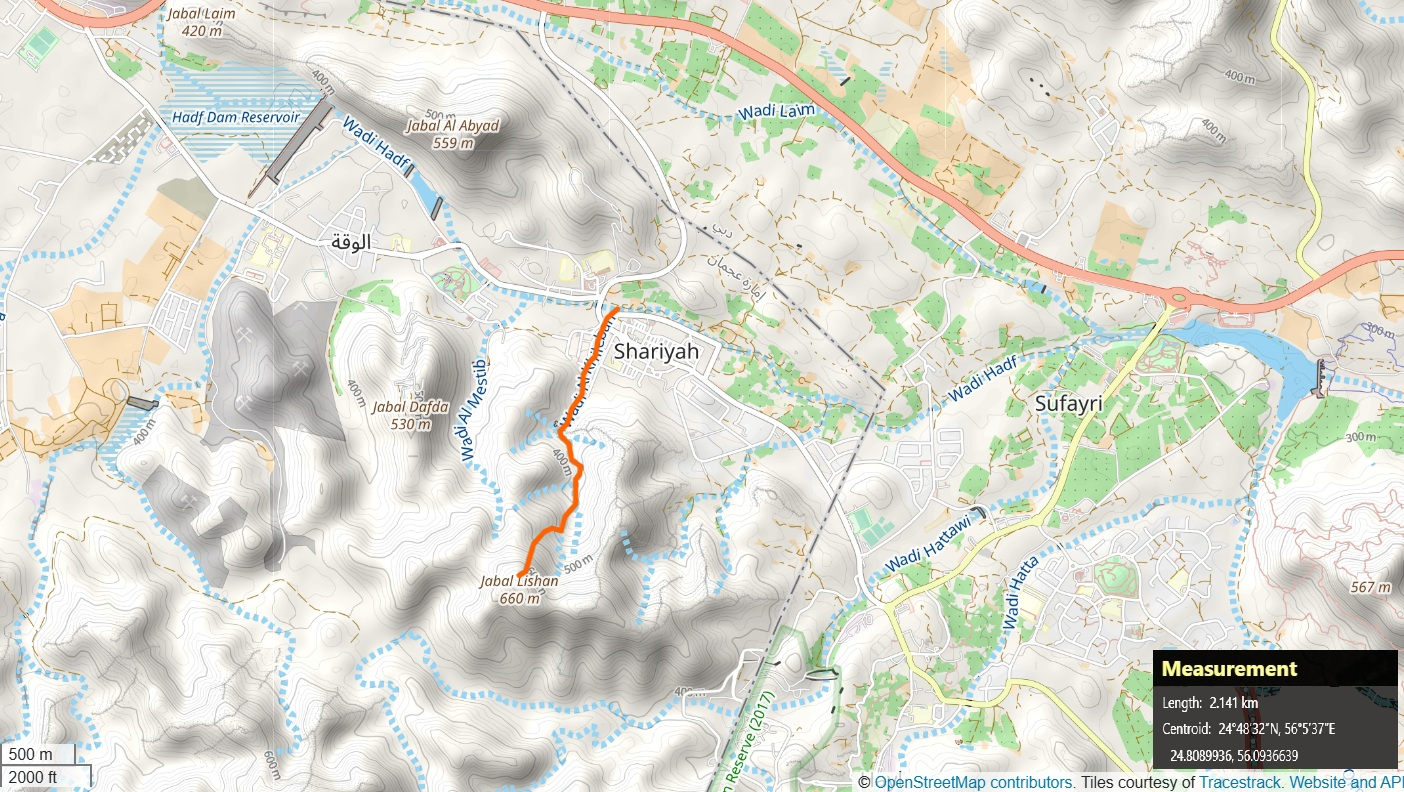
- Location and course of Wadi Al Khulaiban

- Location within United Arab Emirates Location within Persian Gulf Location within West and Central Asia
- Native name: وادي الخليبان (Arabic)

Location
- Country: United Arab Emirates
- Emirate: Ajman

Physical characteristics
- Source: Northeastern slope of Jabal Lishan (660 m (2,170 ft))
  - elevation: 634 m (2,080 ft), approximately
- Mouth: Confluence with the Wadi Hadf
  - coordinates: 25°34′07″N 56°12′03″E
  - elevation: 332 m (1,089 ft)
- Length: 2.5 km (1.6 mi)
- Basin size: 1.2 km^{2} (0.46 mi^{2})

Basin features
- Progression: Wadi. Intermittent flow
- River system: Wadi Hatta

Wadi Al Khulaiban (Arabic: وادي الخليبان, romanized: Wādī Al Khulaybān) is a valley or dry river characterized by ephemeral or intermittent flow, occurring almost exclusively during the rainy season. It is located in the enclave of Masfut (Ajman), east of the United Arab Emirates.

It is a right tributary of the Wadi Hadf, and forms a small sub-basin of 1.2 km^{2} (0.46 mi^{2}), integrated into the large drainage basin of Wadi Hatta (548 km²).

== Course ==
The total approximate length of Wadi Al Khulaiban is 2.5 km (1.6 mi).

It flows from south to north, from its sources located on the northeast slope of Jabal Lishan (634 m (2,080 ft)), at an altitude of approximately 634 m (2,080 ft).

Although it receives water from several small gullies and ravines, the Wadi Al Khulaiban does not have significant tributaries in its short course, and flows into the Wadi Hadf, in a central and residential area of Masfut.

In recent years, Wadi Al Khulaiban has become a popular hiking trail.

== Dams and Reservoirs ==
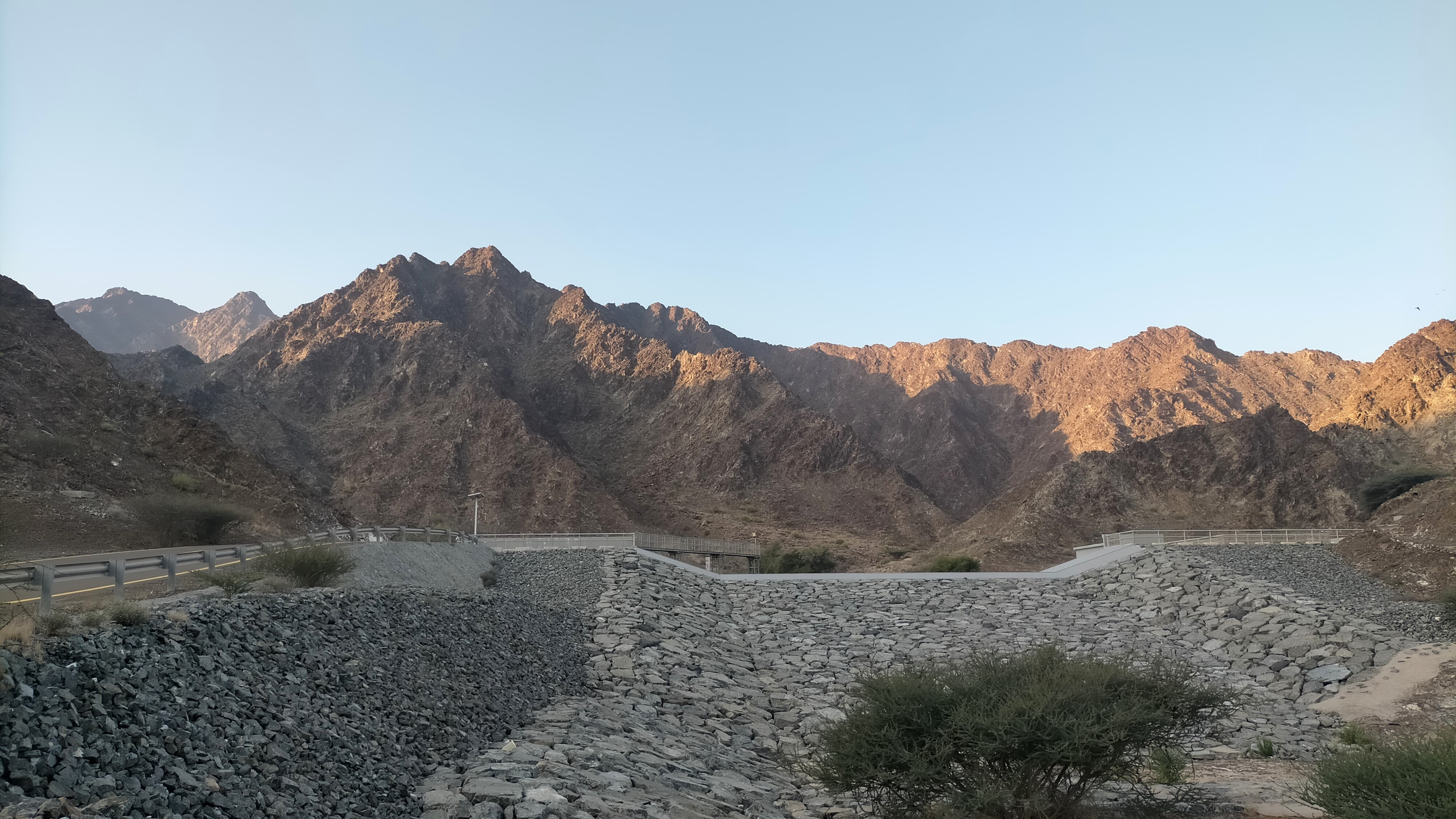
Wadi Al Khulaiban Breaker in the foreground. In the background, Jabal Lishan is visible among other mountains

As in other regions of the UAE, the geographical area of Wadi Al Khulaiban has occasionally been affected by unusually heavy rainfall and flooding.

To prevent the risk of flash floods and increase the recharge potential of groundwater, a dam with a height of 7 m (23 ft), with a reservoir area of 0.036 km^{2} (0.014 mi^{2}) and a capacity of 0.0184 million cubic meters, officially named Al Khileban Dam (Arabic: سد الخليبان) (coordinates: 24°48′37″N, 56°05′34″E), was built in 2002 in the Wadi Al Khulaiban.

== Toponymy ==
Alternative names: Wadi al-Khulayban, Wadi Kholaiban, Wadi Al Khaliban, Wadi Al Khliban, Wadi Al Khulaiban, Wadi Khalaiban, Wādī Al Khulaybān, Wadi Al Khileban.

The name of Wadi Al Khulaiban (spelled Khalaiban), its tributaries, mountains and nearby towns were recorded in the documentation and maps drawn up between 1950 and 1960 by the British Arabist, cartographer, military officer and diplomat Julian F. Walker, during the work carried out to establish the borders between the then so-called Trucial States, later completed by the UK Ministry of Defence, on published 1:100,000 scale maps in 1971.

== Population ==
The Wadi Al Khulaiban area was mainly populated by the Biduwat tribe.

== See also ==
- Wadi Hadf
- List of wadis of the United Arab Emirates
- List of mountains in the United Arab Emirates
- List of wadis of Oman
- List of mountains in Oman
