= Sinadil =

- Location within Oman
- Coordinates: 24°48′46″N 56°1′36″E
- Country: Oman
- Elevation: 423 m (1,388 ft)

Sinadil is a settlement in Oman, located on the northern edge of the Hajjar mountain range just south of the village of Sayh Mudayrah in Ajman, United Arab Emirates. It is 8 km to the west of Hatta in the direction of Hadf. Although Sinadil was originally part of Masfout, which was taken over by Ajman in 1948, it was transferred to Oman in the 1980s, a status confirmed in the 1998 border agreement between the UAE and Oman.

== Geography ==
Sinadil is an old name referring to the triangular piece of land lying between Wadi Hadf and one of its distributaries. The gap through which the wadi exits the Hajjar mountains is 200 metres wide and known as the Sinadil gap. The area is good for agriculture and the wadis are used for irrigation. Agriculture ends about 1 km downstream. A deep gorge at Sinadil has running water most of the year and stretches some 300 meters and is 15 to 20 metres deep.

The Wadi Hadf at Sinadil is unique in that it flows both East to the Wadi Hatta and West to the Madam plain and Wadi Fayah, thereby creating a wadi that flows to the Persian Gulf and Gulf of Oman from a single point in the Hajar Mountains.

== Archaeology ==
Sinadil is the site of numerous ancient petroglyphs.

== Bibliography ==
- Feulner, Gary R., "A mountain wadi that flows to both the Arabian Gulf and the Gulf of Oman", Tribulus: Bulletin of the Emirates Natural History Group, vol. 9.2, pp. 26-28, Autumn/Winter 1999.
- Haerinck, Ernie, "Petroglyphs at Sinadil in the Hajjar mountains", pp. 79-87, in C.S. Phillips, D.T. Potts, S. Searight (eds), Arabia and Its Neighbours: Essays on Prehistorical and Historical Developments Presented in Honour of Beatrice de Cardi, Brepols, 1998 ISBN 2503506658.
