= Wadi Hatta =

Wadi in Oman and UAE

Wadi Hatta Wādī Ḥattā
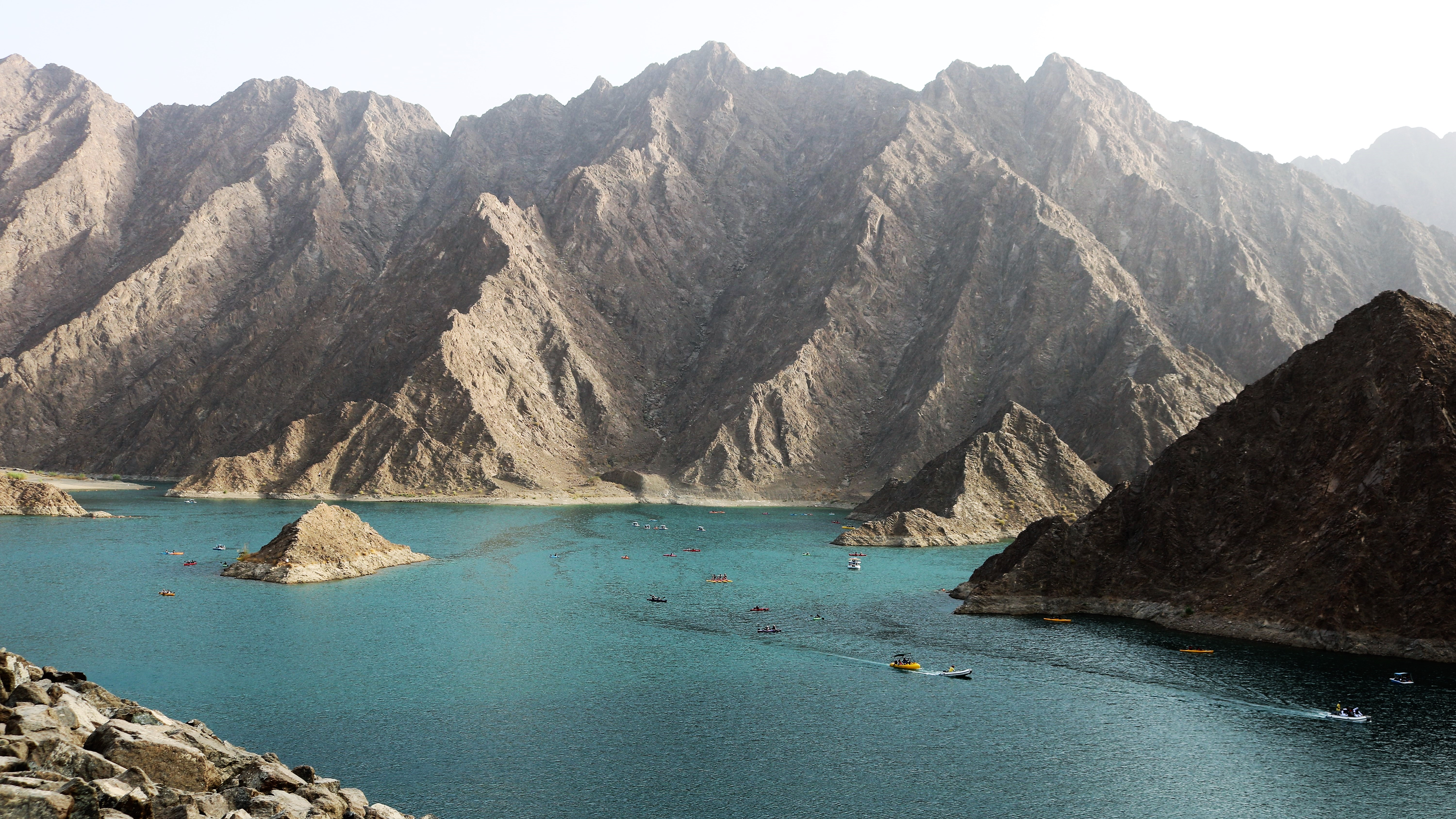

- Location within Oman Location within Persian Gulf Location within West and Central Asia
- Native name: وادي حتّا (Arabic)

Location
- Country: Oman; United Arab Emirates
- Governorate Emirate: Al Batinah North; Dubai

Physical characteristics
- Source: Southern slope of Um Alnosoor / Jabal Hatta (1,280 m (4,200 ft))
  - elevation: 1,192 m (3,911 ft) (approximately)
- Mouth: Al Widayyat City, wilaya of Shinas, in the Gulf of Oman.
  - coordinates: 24°47′4.74″N 56°27′31.61″E
  - elevation: 0 m (0 ft)
- Length: 57 km (35 mi)
- Basin size: 548 km^{2} (212 mi^{2})

Basin features
- Progression: Wadi. Intermittent flow
- River system: Wadi Hatta
- Tributaries
  - left: Wadi Hadf, Wadi Wahiyah, Wadi Umm Daqqayn and Wadi Massayid.
  - right: Wadi Qimah, Wadi al Qahfi, Wadi Nasub, Wadi Khabab, Wadi Sufaydah and Wadi Ashar.

Wadi Hatta (Arabic: وادي حتّا, romanized: Wādī Ḥattā) is a valley or dry river with ephemeral or intermittent flow, which flows almost exclusively during the rainy season, located north of Oman, in the Al Batinah North; and to the east of the United Arab Emirates, in the enclave of Hatta (Dubai).

It forms its own drainage basin, covering an area of approximately 548 km^{2} (212 mi^{2}), and is bordered to the north by the Wadi Al Qor; to the south by the Wadi Fayd; and to the west by the Mahadah drainage basin (Wadi Andhayrah, Wadi Khuraymah, Wadi Mayhah and others, flowing into the large alluvial plain of Madam Plain and the Wadi Yudayyah).

The main wadi, which gives its name to the entire drainage basin, is the Wadi Hatta, with numerous tributaries and sub-tributaries forming an important drainage network composed by hundreds of independent streams, most of them unnamed.

The main tributaries are:

- In Oman: Wadi Umm Daqqayn, Wadi al Qahfi, Wadi Nasub, Wadi Massayid, Wadi Khabab, Wadi Sufaydah and Wadi Ashar.
- In UAE: Wadi Hadf, Wadi Qimah and Wadi Wahiyah.

== Course ==
The total length of Wadi Hatta is 57 km (35 mi), of which 22 km (14 mi) run in Emirati territory, and 35 km (22 mi) in Omani territory. Its river source is located in the territory of Oman, at an approximate altitude of 1,192 m (3,911 ft), on the southern slope and a very short distance from the summit of Jabal Hatta, also known as Um Alnosoor (1,280 m (4,200 ft)).

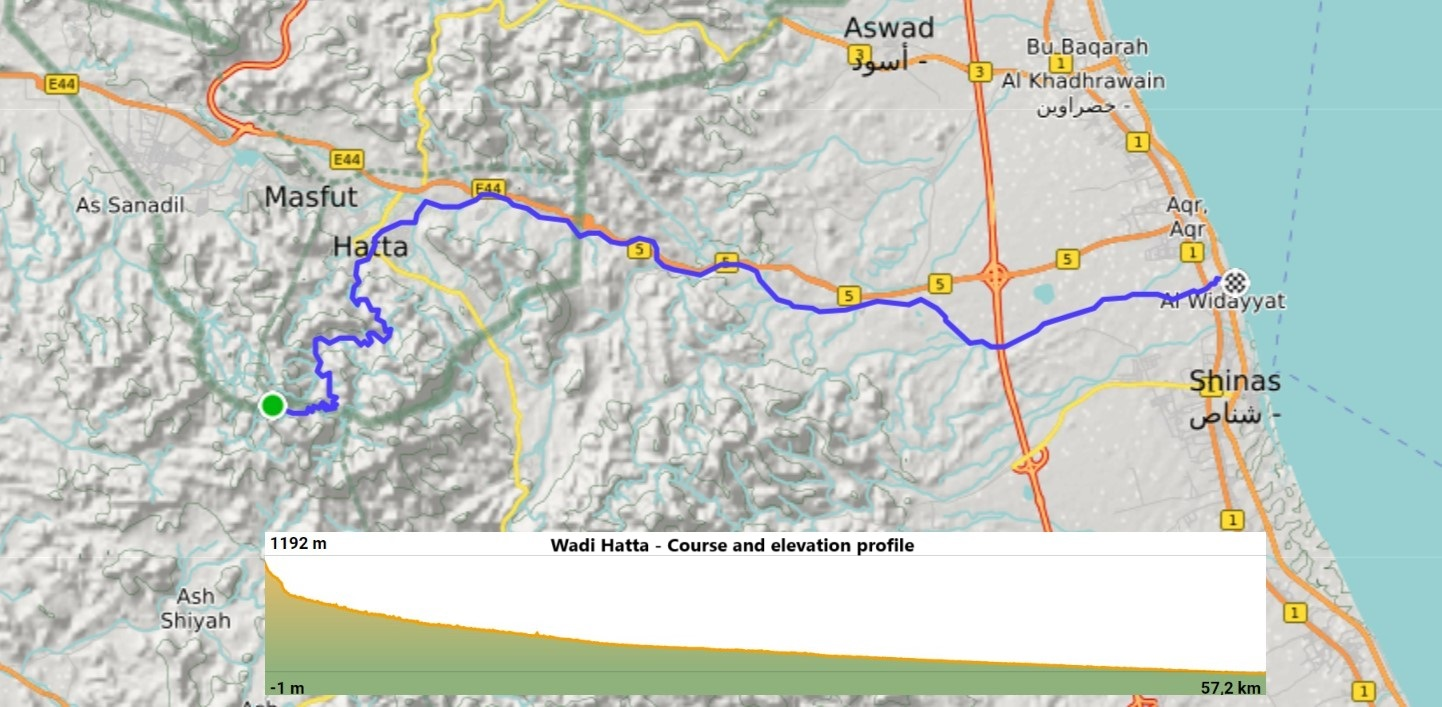
Course chart and elevation profile of Wadi Hatta - Oman and UAE

In its upper course, during the initial 3 km (1.9 mi), which runs mainly in Oman territory, the Wadi Hatta flows from west to east with a considerable gradient, with sections of gradient of 28%.

Already in Emirati territory, the wadi turns north, and for 12 km (7.5 mi) it runs through the Hatta Mountain Reserve to the dam (Al Hatta Dam), with a much more moderate slope of 3%.

In its middle course, the wadi crosses the urban area of the city of Hatta (previously called Ḩajarayn), and receives from the right the confluence of the Wadi Qimah.

One kilometer later, at the Al Khattem Dam, the Wadi Hatta converges with one of its most important tributaries, the Wadi Hadf, which had journeyed 27 km (17 mi) from its source on the northwest slope of Jabal Hatta, passing through, among others, the towns of Hadf and Sinadil, in Oman, and the enclave of Masfut (Arabic: مصفوت, romanized: Sha'biyyat Maşfūt), from the emirate of Ajman.

From Al Khattem Dam, the Wadi Hatta continues its course from west to east, receiving the confluence of the Wadi Wahiyah on the left.

Also on its left bank, on the other side of the E44 highway, in the territory of the Emirate of Dubai, and less than 300 meters from the wadi bed, there are traces of large quarries, currently abandoned, whose activity caused a great environmental impact, with irreparable damage to the natural environment, destroying a large part of the mountain and the courses of several small wadis tributaries to Wadi Hatta.

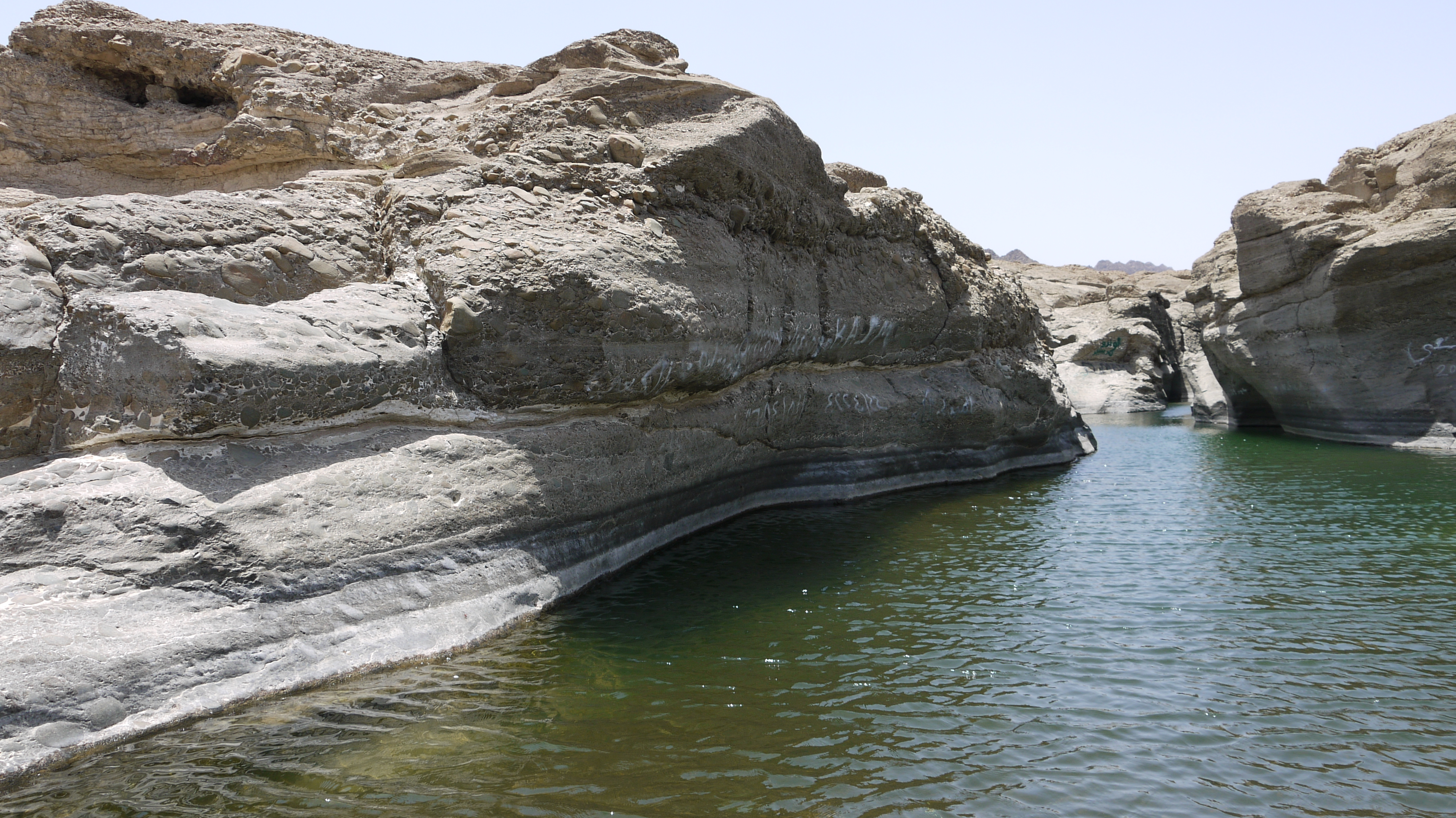
Natural ponds in the course of the Wadi al Qahfi, a tributary of the Wadi Hatta, Oman

Already in the territory of the Sultanate of Oman, the Wadi Hatta receives from the right the confluence of its main tributary, the Wadi al Qahfi, 37 km (23 mi) long, very popular for hosting along its course numerous natural ponds and freshwater pools, accessible by vehicle through a dirt track. Some visitors and several Emirati tourist information portals confuse this wadi with Wadi Hatta, and one of the most frequented pool areas is wrongly called Hatta Pools.

In its lower course, the Wadi Hatta converges with another important tributary, the Wadi Khabab, 20 km (12 mi) long, and a minor tributary: the Wadi Sufaydah.

In the final stretch, through the wide fan that forms its extensive alluvial plain and as often occurs in other plains of similar morphology, the Wadi Hatta branches into multiple braided channels, intertwined and interspersed with small islands of coarse sediment. Over time, the wadi's current tends to wander between torrential rains, altering the previous courses, which nevertheless maintain their mark on the plain.

Near the area of its mouth, the Wadi Hatta branches into two main channels, reaching the coast of the Gulf of Oman at the city of Al Widayyat, wilaya of Shinas.

== Dams and reservoirs ==
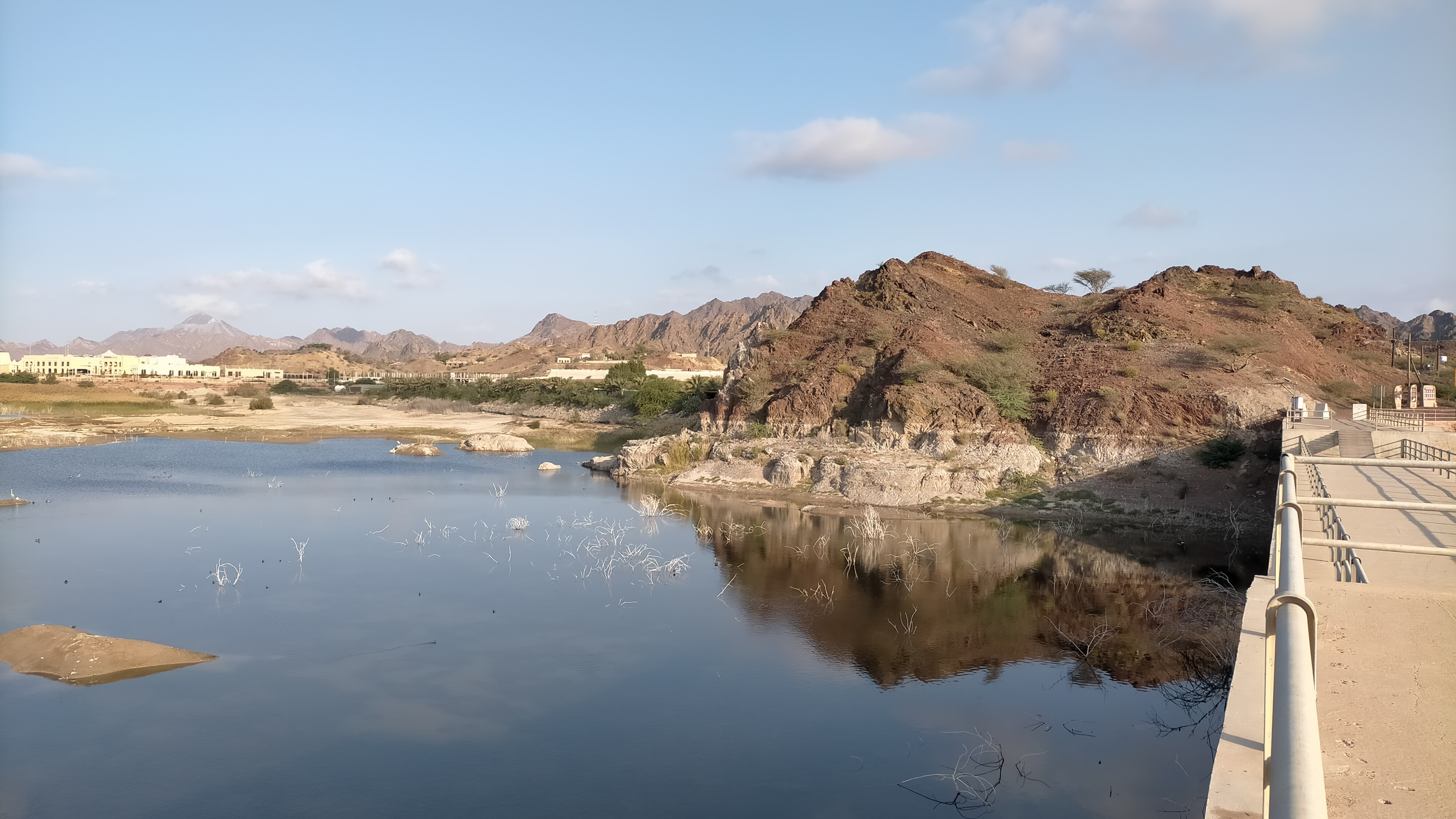
Al Khattem Dam. Confluence of the Wadi Hatta and one of its main tributaries, the Wadi Hadf

To supply water to the inhabitants of the area, prevent the danger of flash floods, and increase the potential for recharging groundwater, several dams have been built since the 1990s in the Wadi Hatta catchment area (including all its tributaries), all of them in UAE territory, none in Oman:

- In the sub-basin of Wadi Hadf, in the territory of the Emirate of Ajman: Hadf Dam (coordinates: 24°49′37″N, 56°4′30″E); Al Mestib Dam (coordinates: 24°48′50″N, 56°5′16″E); Al Khileban Dam (coordinates: 24°48′37″N, 56°5′34″E) and Muzaira'a Dam (coordinates: 24°49′5″N, 56°2′53″E). Shortly after the confluence of Wadi al Amed / Wadi Amid with Wadi Hattawi (a tributary of Wadi Hadf), a dam called Al Ghabra Dam was also built in the territory of the Emirate of Dubai (coordinates: 24°47′44″N, 56°6′36″E).
- There are also several dams in Wadi Hatta itself: Hatta Dam (coordinates: 24°47′1″N, 56°6′53″E), Al Khattem Dam (coordinates: 24°48′46″N, 56°8′33″E) and Suhaila Dam (coordinates: 24°48'39"N 56°10'52"E), whose characteristics and construction references are not included in the inventory of dams of the FAO, nor in that of the Ministry of Energy and Infrastructure of the United Arab Emirates. There are also several smaller dams, intended to capture the overflows of the main dams.

Of all the dams, the best known, due to its size and large reservoir with a surface area of 30 hectares and permanent water, is Hatta Dam, built at the end of the 1990s. It has a height of 32 m (105 ft) and a crest length of approximately 220 m (720 ft). The dam core is made of asphalt concrete with a gravel-fill embankment.

A new dam and pumped storage hydropower plant located near the existing reservoir is under construction.

== Archeology ==
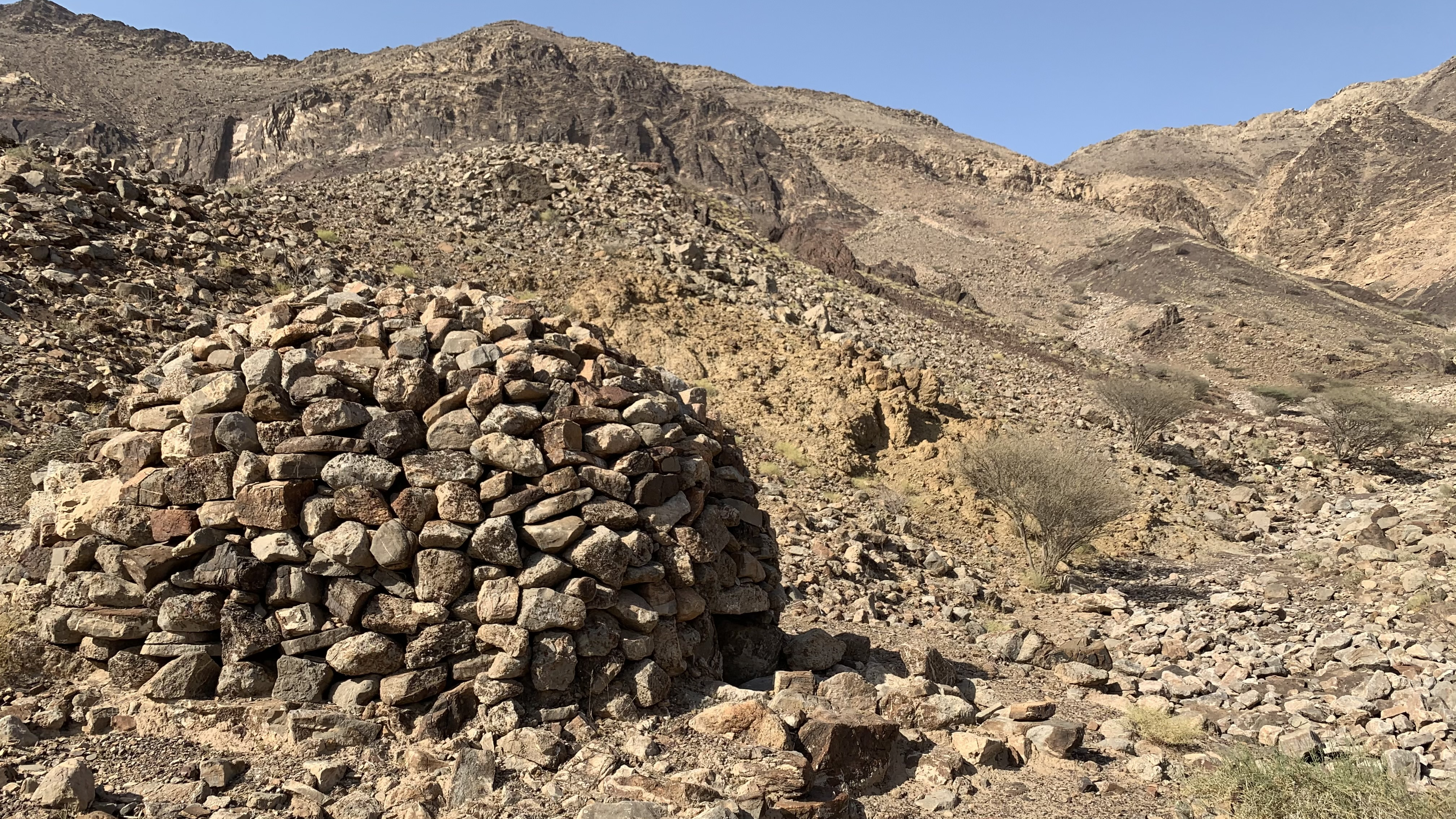
Burials from the period 2500-2000 BC in the Jabal al Yamh area

A short distance from the Wadi Hatta riverbed, in the area known as Jabal al Yamh, in the territory of Dubai, the archaeological site of Hatta contains more than 50 burials dating from the second half of the third millennium (2500-2000 BC) in accordance with the traditional type of construction of the cemeteries of Umm Al Nar. The petroglyphs discovered there are among the most diverse in the United Arab Emirates.

== The protected mountain reserve area and the Ramsar site ==
In 2014, the Dubai Municipality formally established eight protected areas across the Emirate, in order to protect, restore and promote the ecosystems and biodiversity, through a series of scientific research, monitoring, education and sustainable recreation initiatives.

Among the protected areas is the Hatta Mountain Reserve, located entirely south of the Hatta enclave, on the NNE slope of the Um Alnosoor / Jabal Hatta (1,280 m (4,200 ft)), coinciding with a large part of the upper course of the Wadi Hatta, in a very steep and difficult area. The protected area initially had an area of 27 km^{2} (10 mi^{2}), but in 2017, when the administrative boundaries between the emirates of Dubai and Ajman were modified, the protected area was reduced to 22 km^{2} (8.5 mi^{2}).

In January 2019, the same area was declared a Ramsar site of the United Arab Emirates.

== Toponymy ==
Alternative names: Wādī Ḥattā, Wādī Ḩattā, Wādī Ḩattā.

The name of Wadi Hatta (spelled Wādī Ḩattá), its tributaries, mountains and nearby towns was recorded in the documentation and maps produced between 1950 and 1960 by the British Arabist, cartographer, military officer and diplomat Julian F. Walker, during the work carried out to establish the borders between the then called Trucial States, and later completed by the Ministry of Defence of the United Kingdom, on scale maps 1:100,000 published in 1971.

In the National Atlas of the United Arab Emirates it is spelled Wādī Ḥattā.

== Population ==
The Wadi Hatta area was populated mainly by the Washahat tribes, Biduwat, and Bani Kaab.

== See also ==
- List of wadis of the United Arab Emirates
- List of mountains in the United Arab Emirates
- List of wadis of Oman
- List of mountains in Oman
