= Cretan Muslims =

Historical Muslim population of Crete

Cretan Muslims Τουρκοκρητικοί Giritli Türkler
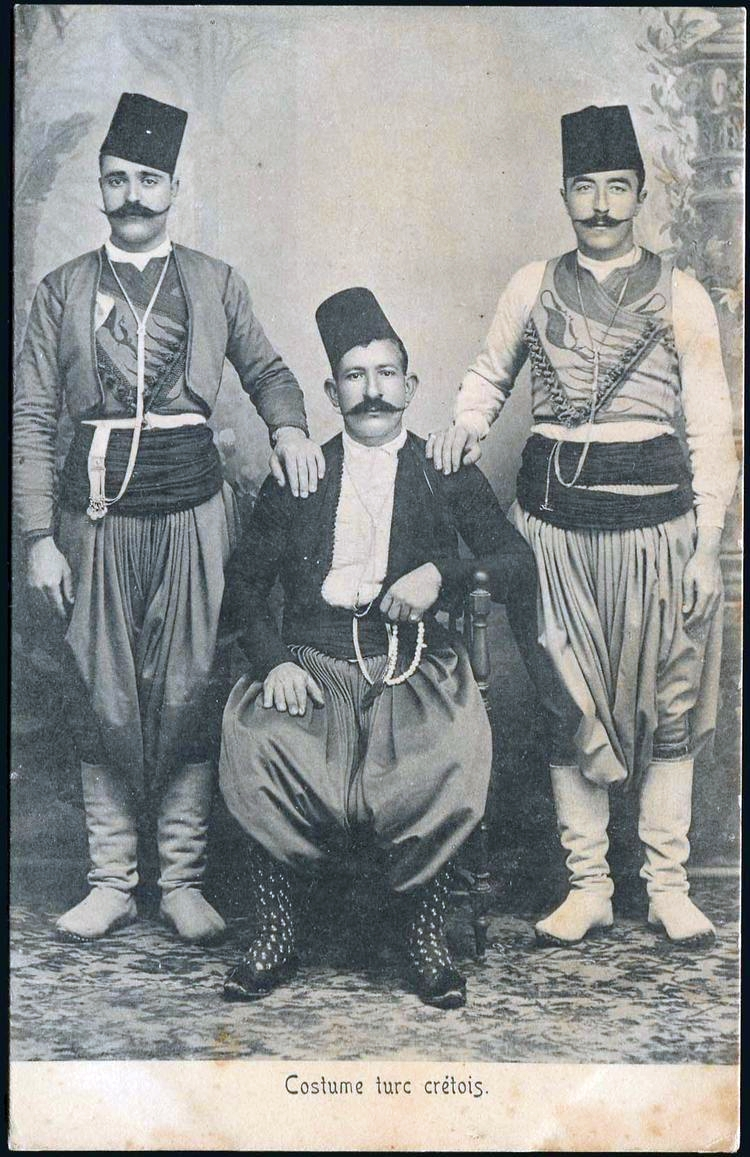
- Cretan Muslims in their traditional costume, 19th–20th century

Total population
- est. 450,000 (1971 estimate)

Regions with significant populations
- Turkey: 200,000 (1971)
- Egypt: 100,000 (1971)
- Libya: 100,000 (1971)
- Other countries (Lebanon, Syria etc.): 50,000 (1971)

Religions
- Sunni Islam

Languages
- Cretan Greek, Turkish, Arabic

The Cretan Muslims or Cretan Turks (Greek: Τουρκοκρητικοί or Τουρκοκρήτες, Tourkokritikí or Tourkokrítes; Turkish: Giritli, Girit Türkleri, or Giritli Türkler; Arabic: أتراك كريت) were the Greek Muslim inhabitants of the island of Crete. Their descendants settled principally in Turkey, the Dodecanese Islands under Italian administration (part of Greece since 1947), Syria (notably in the village of Al-Hamidiyah), Lebanon, Palestine, Libya, and Egypt, as well as in the larger Turkish diaspora.

Cretan Muslims were descendants of ethnic Greeks who had converted to Islam after the Ottoman conquest of Crete in the seventeenth century. They identified as Greek Muslims, and were referred to as "Turks" by some Christian Greeks due to their religion, not their ethnic background. Many Cretan Greeks had converted to Islam in the wake of the Ottoman conquest of Crete. This high rate of local conversions to Islam was similar to that in Bosnia-Herzegovina, Albania, parts of western Greek Macedonia (such as the Greek Muslim Vallahades), and Bulgaria. Some argue even for a uniquely high rate of conversions, rather than caused by immigration. The Greek Muslims of Crete continued to speak Cretan Greek, and also retained their Greek cultural identity. European travellers' accounts note that the "Turks" of Crete were mostly not of Turkic origin, but were Cretan converts from Orthodoxy.

Sectarian violence during the 19th century caused many Muslims to leave Crete, especially during the Cretan Revolt (1897–1898), and after Crete's unilateral declaration of union with Greece in 1908. Finally, after the Greco-Turkish War of 1919–1922, the remaining Muslims of Crete were compulsorily exchanged for the Greek Christians of Anatolia under the terms of the Treaty of Lausanne (1923).

At all periods, most Cretan Muslims were Greek-speaking, using the Cretan Greek dialect, but the language of administration and the prestige language for the Muslim urban upper classes was Ottoman Turkish. In the folk tradition, however, Cretan Greek was used to express Muslims' "Islamic—often Bektashi—sensibility". Today, the highest number of the Turkocretan descendants can be found in Ayvalık. Those who left Crete in the late 19th and early 20th centuries settled largely along Turkey's Aegean and Mediterranean coast. Alongside Ayvalık and Cunda Island, they settled in İzmir, Çukurova, Bodrum, Side, Mudanya, Adana and Mersin.

== History ==
Starting in 1645, the Ottoman Empire gradually took Crete from the Republic of Venice, which had ruled it since 1204. In the final major defeat, Candia (modern Iraklion) fell to the Ottomans in 1669 (though some offshore islands remained Venetian until 1715). Crete remained part of the Ottoman Empire until 1897.

The fall of Crete was not accompanied by an influx of Muslims. At the same time, many Cretans converted to Islam – more than in any other part of the Greek world. Various explanations have been given for this, including the disruption of war, the possibility of receiving a timar (for those who went over to the Ottomans during the war), Latin-Orthodox dissension, avoidance of the head-tax (cizye) on non-Muslims, the increased social mobility of Muslims, and the opportunity that Muslims had of joining the paid militia (which the Cretans also aspired to under Venetian rule).

It is difficult to estimate the proportion which became Muslim, as Ottoman cizye tax records count only Christians: estimates range from 30 to 40% By the late 18th century, as many as 30% of the islanders may have been Muslim. The Muslim population declined through the 19th century, and by the last Ottoman census, in 1881, Muslims were only 26% of the population, concentrated in the three large towns on the north coast, and in Monofatsi.

Year	1821	1832	1858	1881	1900	1910	1920	1928
Muslims	47%	43%	22%	26%	11%	8%	7%	0%

People who claim descent from Cretan Muslims are still found in several Muslim countries today, and principally in Turkey.

Between 1821 and 1828, during the Greek War of Independence, the island was the scene of repeated hostilities. Most Muslims were driven into the large fortified towns on the north coast and both the Muslim and Christian populations of the island suffered severe losses, due to conflicts, plague or famine. In the 1830s, Crete was an impoverished and backward island.

Since the Ottoman sultan, Mahmud II, had no army of his own available, he was forced to seek the aid of his rebellious vassal and rival, Kavalalı Mehmed Ali Pasha of Egypt, who sent troops to the island. Starting in 1832, the island was administered for two decades by Mustafa Naili Pasha, whose rule attempted to create a synthesis between the Muslim landowners and the emergent Christian commercial classes. His rule was generally cautious, pro-British, and he tried harder to win the support of the Christians (having married the daughter of a priest and allowed her to remain Christian) than the Muslims. In 1834, however, a Cretan committee had already been founded in Athens to work for the union of the island with Greece.

In 1840, Egypt was forced by Palmerston to return Crete to direct Ottoman rule. Mustafa Naili Pasha angled unsuccessfully to become a semi-independent prince but the Cretans rose up against him, once more driving the Muslims temporarily into siege in the towns. An Anglo-Ottoman naval operation restored control in the island and Mustafa Naili Pasha was confirmed as its governor, though under command from Istanbul. He remained in Crete until 1851 when he was summoned to the capital, where at a relatively advanced age he pursued a successful career.

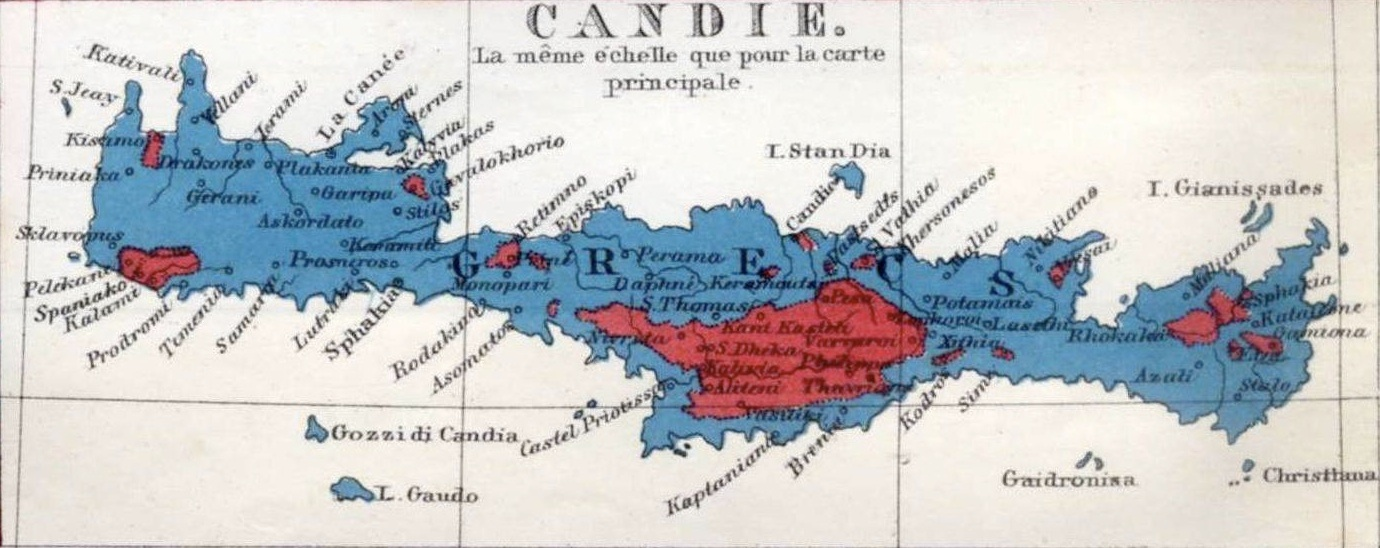
An ethnic map of Crete, around 1861. Greek Orthodox Cretan Muslim/Turkish

Religious tensions erupted on the island between Muslims and Christians and the Christian populations of Crete revolted twice against Ottoman rule (in 1866 and in 1897). In the uprising of 1866, the rebels initially managed to gain control of most of the hinterland although as always the four fortified towns of the north coast and the southern town of Ierapetra remained in Ottoman hands. The Ottoman approach to the "Cretan question" was that, if Crete was lost, the next line of defense would have to be the Dardanelles, as indeed it was the case later. The Ottoman Grand Vizier, Mehmed Emin Aali Pasha arrived in the island in October 1867 and set in progress a low profile district-by-district reconquest of the island followed by the erection of blockhouses or local fortresses across the whole of it. More importantly, he designed an Organic Law which gave the Cretan Christians equal (in practice, because of their superior numbers, majority) control of local administration. At the time of the Congress of Berlin in the summer of 1878, there was a further uprising, which was speedily halted through the adaptation of the Organic Law into a constitutional settlement known as the Pact of Halepa.

Crete became a semi-independent parliamentary state within the Ottoman Empire under a Greek Orthodox Governor. A number of the senior "Christian Pashas" including Photiades Pasha and Adossides Pasha ruled the island in the 1880s, presiding over a parliament in which liberals and conservatives contended for power. Disputes between these led to a further insurgency in 1889 and the collapse of the Pact of Halepa arrangements. The international powers allowed the Ottoman authorities to send troops to the island and restore order but the Sultan Abdulhamid II used the occasion for ruling the island by martial law. This action led to international sympathy for the Cretan Christians and to a loss of any remaining acquiescence among them for continued Ottoman rule. When a small insurgency began in September 1895, it quickly spiralled out of control and by the summer of 1896, the Ottoman forces had lost military control over most of the island. A new insurrection that began in 1897 led to a war between Greece and the Ottoman Empire. The Great Powers dispatched a multinational naval force, the International Squadron, to Crete in February 1897, and by late March 1897 it brought Cretan insurgent and Greek Army operations against the Ottomans in Crete to a halt by forcing the Greek Army to abandon the island, bombarding insurgent forces, placing sailors and marines ashore, and instituting a blockade of Crete and key ports in Greece. Meanwhile, the International Squadron's senior admirals formed an "Admirals Council" that temporarily governed Crete pending a resolution of the Cretan uprising, and the Admirals Council eventually decided that Crete should become an autonomous state within the Ottoman Empire. After a violent riot by Cretan Muslims against Cretan Christians and British occupation forces on 6 September 1898 (25 August according to the Julian calendar then in use on Crete, which was 12 days behind the modern Gregorian calendar during the 19th century), the Admirals Council ordered all Ottoman forces to leave Crete, and the last of them were evacuated on 6 November 1898. The 21 December 1898 (9 December according to the Julian calendar) arrival of Prince George of Greece and Denmark as the first High commissioner of an autonomous Cretan State, although still under the suzerainty of the Sultan, effectively detached Crete from the Ottoman Empire.

The island's Muslim population dropped dramatically because of these changes, with many emigrating to other parts of the Ottoman Empire. From the summer of 1896 until the end of hostilities in 1898, Cretan Muslims remained under siege in the four coastal cities, where massacres against them took place. Subsequent waves of emigration followed as the island was united by stages with Greece. In 1908, the Cretan deputies declared union with Greece, which was internationally recognized after the Balkan Wars in 1913. Under the Treaty of London, Sultan Mehmed V relinquished his formal rights to the island.

In 1913, during the celebrations for the enosis of Crete with Greece in Chania, Mehmet Semoutlis, the general religious head of Cretan Muslims, welcomed King Constantine I of Greece and stated that the Muslim population would be sincerely devoted to him so long as the government remained just. He further expressed the hope that the Muslims of Crete would live in harmony with "their compatriots" and prosper together with them.

On the eve of the Greek landing at Smyrna, Eleftherios Venizelos sent the Herakliote minister Michael Makrakis to Smyrna to speak with Cretan Muslims who had settled there by 1913, in order to win them over to the Greek cause. The mission was considered a success, overall, although it also reported that "the worst elements" among the Cretan Muslims, including criminals and escaped convicts, had gone over to the Turkish side. A Greek journalist in Smyrna, Pantelis Kapsis Sr., wrote retrospectively in 1934 that Makrakis did a good job and that the Cretan Muslims "became our friends and helped us greatly".

During the Greco-Turkish War (1919–1922), Cretan Muslims gave financial assistance to Greek refugees, victims of the Greek genocide, and, later, victims of the Burning of Smyrna. Many of them also served in the Greek Army.

The Cretan Muslims were forced to leave Crete under the population exchange between Greece and Turkey in 1923. This was met with distraught from many Cretan Muslims, who sent telegrams to Fridtjof Nansen asking not to be sent to Turkey, because they would be "separated from their neighbours and friends". Some of them sought foreign citizenship to avoid the exchange, while around 1,000 even attempted to convert to Christianity in order to remain in Crete.

In Turkey, some descendants of this population continued to speak a form of Cretan Greek until recently.

== Culture ==
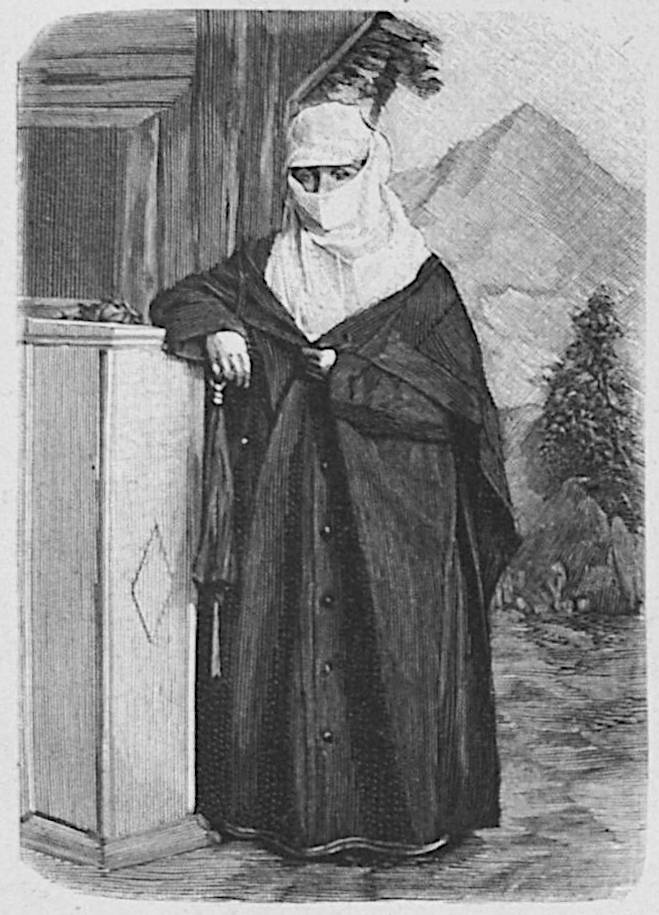
A Cretan Muslim woman, illustrated in 1896

=== Literature ===
Turks in Crete produced a varied literary output, leading one researcher to define a "Cretan School" which counts twenty-one poets who evolved within Ottoman Divan poetry or Turkish folk literature traditions, especially in the 18th century. Personal, mystical, fantastic themes abound in the works of these men of letters, reflecting the dynamism of the cultural life in the island.

A taste and echo of this tradition can be perceived in the verses below by Giritli Sırrı Pasha (1844–1895);

Fidânsın nev-nihâl-i hüsn ü ânsın âfet-i cânsın
Gül âşık bülbül âşıkdır sana, bir özge cânânsın

which were certainly addressed to his wife, the poet-composer Leyla Saz, herself a notable figure of Turkish literature and Turkish Classical Music.

Recently, a number of books written by descendants of Cretan Muslims in the form of novelized family souvenirs with scenes set in Crete and Anatolia have seen the day in Turkey's book market. Saba Altınsay's "Kritimu" and Ahmet Yorulmaz's trilogy were the first to set the example in this move. There has even been family souvenirs written by the Cretan Muslim writer Mustafa Olpak, whose biographies in retrospect from the shores of Istanbul, Crete and Kenya follow his grandfathers who were initially brought to the Ottoman Empire as slaves to Crete. (see below: Further reading).

=== Music ===
A study by one Greek researcher counts six Cretan Muslims who engaged themselves into music in Cretan Greek dialect. The Cretans brought the musical tradition they shared with the Cretan Christians to Turkey with them. Musicologist Chris Williams writes:

One of the significant aspects of Giritli [Cretan Muslim] culture is that this Islamic—often Bektashi—sensibility is expressed through the Greek language. [There has been] some confusion about their cultural identity, and an assumption is often made that their music was somehow more "Turkish" than "Cretan". In my view this assumption is quite wrong ...

But certain instruments were more often used by Christians: there are few cases of Muslim Cretan lyra-players compared to Christians: the very name for that instrument in Turkish language being Rum kemençesi – Greek kemenche.

=== Cretan Muslim popular culture in Turkey ===
Nuances may be observed among the waves of immigrations from Crete and the respective behavioral patterns. At the end of the 19th century Muslims fled reprisal to take refuge in the present-day territory of Turkey or beyond (see Al Hamidiyah). During the 1910s, with the termination of the Cretan State which had recognized the Muslim community of the island a proper status, many others left. The Greco-Turkish War (1919–22) and the ensuing population exchange is the final chapter among the root causes that shaped these nuances.

Among contributions made by Cretan Muslims to the Turkish culture in general, the first to be mentioned should be their particular culinary traditions based on consumption at high-levels of olive oil and of a surprisingly wide array of herbs and other plant-based raw materials. While they have certainly not introduced olive oil and herbs to their compatriots, Cretan Muslims have greatly extended the knowledge and paved the way for a more varied use of these products. Their predilection for herbs, some of which could be considered as unusual ones, has also been the source of some jokes. The Giritli chain of restaurants in Istanbul, Ankara and Bodrum, and Ayşe Ün's "Girit Mutfağı" (Cretan Cuisine) eateries in İzmir are indicative references in this regard. Occasional although intrinsically inadequate care has also been demonstrated by the authorities in the first years of the Turkish Republic for settling Cretan Muslims in localities where vineyards left by the departed Greeks were found, since this capital was bound to be lost in the hands of cultivators with no prior knowledge of viniculture. In the field of maritime industries, the pioneer of gulet boats construction that became a vast industry in Bodrum in our day, Ziya Güvendiren was a Cretan Muslim, as are many of his former apprentices who themselves have become master shipbuilders and who are based in Bodrum or Güllük today.

An overall pattern of investing in expertise and success remains remarkable among Cretan Muslims, as attested by the notable names below. However, with sex roles and social change starting out from different grounds for Cretan Muslims, the adaptation to the "fatherland" did not always take place without pain, including that of being subjected to slurs as in other cases involving immigration of people. According to Peter Loizos, they were often relegated to the poorest land:

They were briefly feted on arrival, as 'Turks' 'returning' to the Turkish heartland... like the Asia Minor Christians seeking to settle on land in northern Greece, the Muslim refugees found that local people, sometimes government officials, had already occupied the best land and housing.

The same author depicts a picture where they did not share the "Ottoman perceptions of certain crafts and trades as being of low status", so more entrepreneurial opportunities were open to them. Like others who did not speak Turkish, they suffered during the "Citizen, speak Turkish!" campaign which started in 1928. "Arabs, Circassians, Cretan Muslims, and Kurds in the country were being targeted for not speaking Turkish. In Mersin, for instance, 'Kurds, Cretans, Arabs and Syrians' were being fined for speaking languages other than Turkish.". In the summary translation of a book on Bodrum made by Loizos, it is stated that, even as late as 1967, the Cretans and the 'local Turks' did not mix in some towns; they continued to speak Greek and mostly married other Cretans.

== Diaspora in Lebanon and Syria ==
As of 2006 there were about 7,000 Greek speakers living in Tripoli, Lebanon and about 3,000 in Al Hamidiyah, Syria, the majority of them Muslims of Cretan origin. Records suggest that the community left Crete between 1866 and 1897, on the outbreak of the last Cretan uprising against the Ottoman Empire, which ended the Greco-Turkish War of 1897. Sultan Abdul Hamid II provided Cretan Muslim families who fled the island with refuge on the Levantine coast. The new settlement was named Hamidiye after the sultan.

Many Cretan Muslims of Lebanon somewhat managed to preserve their identity and language. Unlike neighboring communities, they are monogamous and consider divorce a disgrace. Their community was close-knit and entirely endogamous until the Lebanese Civil War, when many of them were forced to migrate and the community was dispersed.

Cretan Muslims constitute 60% of Al Hamidiyah's population. The community is very much concerned with maintaining its culture. The knowledge of the spoken Greek language is remarkably good and their contact with their historical homeland has been possible by means of satellite television and relatives.

== Notable people ==
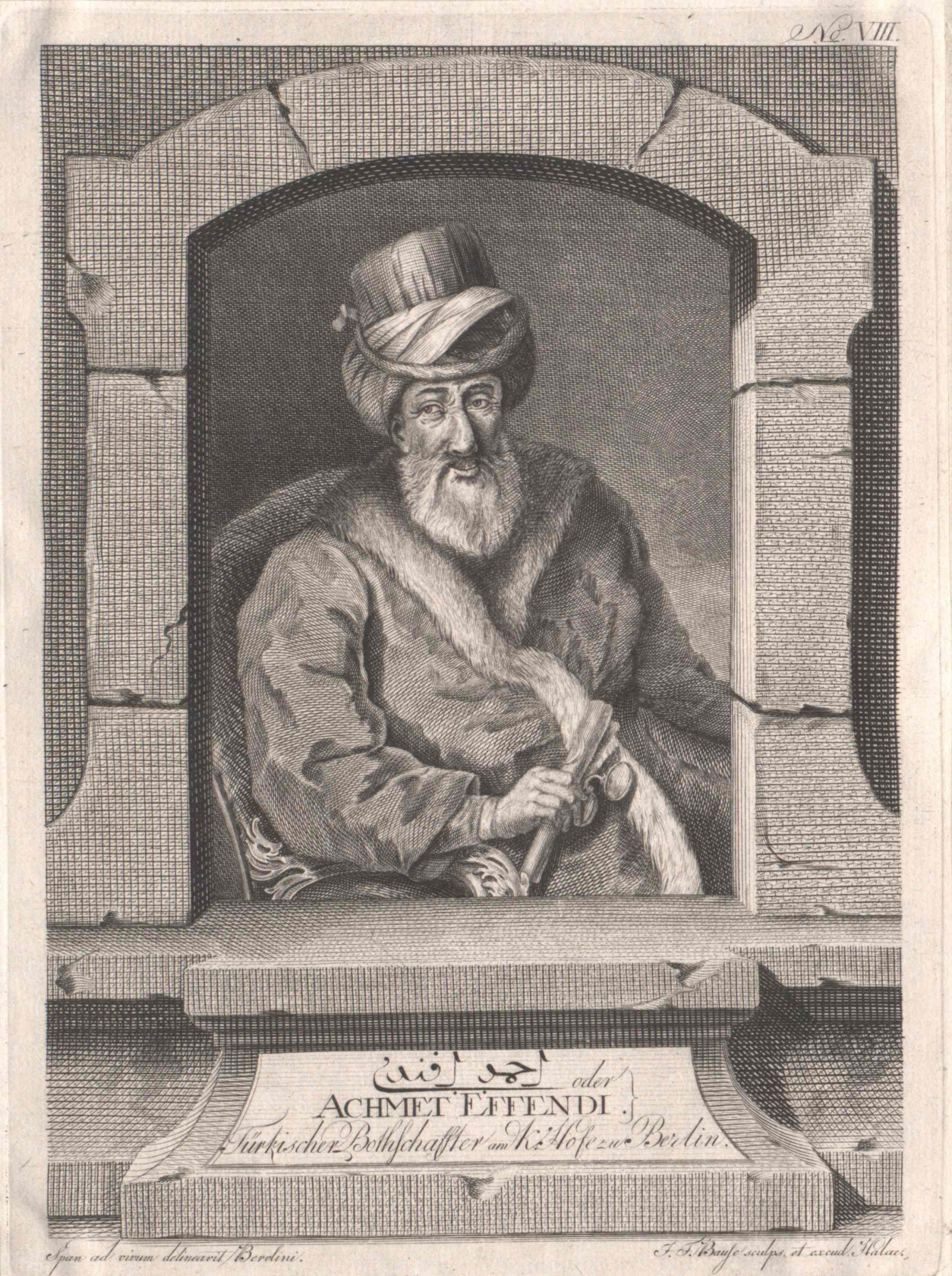
Ahmed Resmî Efendi (1700–1783) an Ottoman statesman and historian, who was born into a Muslim family of Greek descent in Crete.

- Ahmed Resmî Efendi: 18th-century Ottoman statesman, diplomat and author (notably of two sefâretnâme). First ever Ottoman ambassador in Berlin (during Frederick the Great's reign). He was born into a Muslim family of Greek descent in the Cretan town of Rethymno in the year 1700.
- Giritli Ali Aziz Efendi: Turkey's third ambassador in Berlin and arguably the first Turkish author to have written in novelistic form.
- Al-Husayn I ibn Ali at-Turki – founder of the Husainid Dynasty, which ruled Tunisia until 1957.
- Salacıoğlu: (1750 Hanya – 1825 Kandiye): One of the most important 18th-century poets of Turkish folk literature.
- Giritli Sırrı Pasha: Ottoman administrator, Leyla Saz's husband and a notable man of letters in his own right.
- Vedat Tek: Representative figure of the First National Architecture Movement in Turkish architecture. Son of Leyla Saz and Giritli Sırrı Pasha.
- Paul Mulla (alias Mollazade Mehmed Ali): born Muslim, converted to Christianity and becoming a Roman Catholic priest and scholar of Islam.
- Rahmizâde Bahaeddin Bediz: The first Turkish photographer by profession. The thousands of photographs he took, based as of 1895 successively in Crete, İzmir, Istanbul and Ankara (as Head of the Photography Department of Turkish Historical Society), have immense historical value.
- Salih Zeki: Turkish photographer in Chania
- Ali Nayip Zade: Associate of Eleftherios Venizelos, Prefect of Drama and Kavala, Adrianople, and Lasithi.
- Ismail Fazil Pasha: (1856–1921) descended from the rooted Cebecioğlu family of Söke who had settled in Crete He has been the first Minister of Public Works in the government of Grand National Assembly in 1920. He was the father of Ali Fuad and Mehmed Ali.
- Mehmet Atıf Ateşdağlı: (1876–1947) Turkish officer.
- Mustafa Ertuğrul Aker: (1892–1961) Turkish officer who sank HMS Ben-my-Chree.
- Writer Cevat Şakir Kabaağaçlı, alias Halikarnas Balıkçısı (The Fisherman of Halicarnassus), although born in Crete and has often let himself be cited as Cretan, descends from a family of Ottoman aristocracy with roots in Afyonkarahisar, and his father had been an Ottoman High Commissioner in Crete and later ambassador in Athens.
- Hüsamettin Cindoruk: Turkish politician, president of the Turkish Republic.
- Bülent Arınç (born 25 May 1948) is a Deputy Prime Minister of Turkey since 2009. He is of Cretan Muslim heritage with his ancestors arriving to Turkey as Cretan refugees during the time of Sultan Abdul Hamid II and is fluent in Cretan Greek. Arınç is a proponent of reconverting the Hagia Sophia into a mosque, which has caused diplomatic protestations from Greece.
- Halil Berktay (born 27 August 1947) Turkish historian of Cretan Muslim origin.
- Tuba Büyüküstün, Turkish actress
- Hülya Avşar, Turkish actress (maternal Cretan Muslim-Yörük and paternal Kurdish)
- Ferdi Özbeğen, Turkish singer
- Bennu Yıldırımlar, Turkish actress
- Necip Fazıl Kısakürek, Turkish Islamist poet (on mother side)
- Mustafa Fehmi Kubilay, was a Turkish teacher and a lieutenant. He is considered a "Martyr of the Revolution" in Turkey.
- Hasan Piker, Turkish-American Twitch streamer, influencer, and left-wing political commentator. His father's side is from Thessaloniki and Crete.

== See also ==
- Al Hamidiyah
- Cretan State
- Emirate of Crete
- Greek Muslims
- History of Crete
- International Squadron (Crete intervention, 1897–1898)
- Massacre of Phocaea
- Turks in Lebanon
