= Wadi Hadf =

Wadi in Oman and UAE

Wadi Hadf Wādī Ḩadf
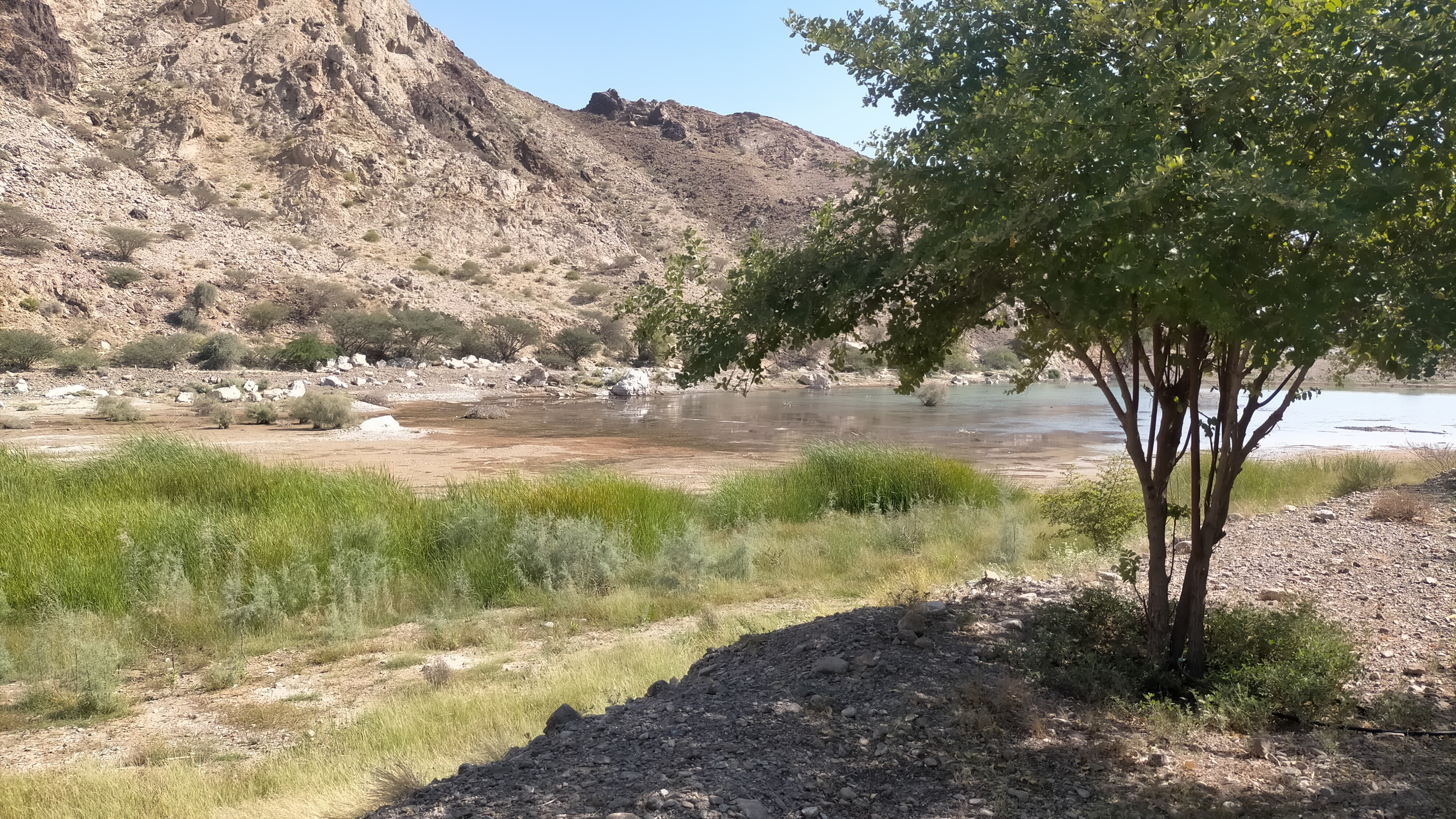

- Location within United Arab Emirates Location within Persian Gulf Location within West and Central Asia
- Native name: وادي حدف (Arabic)

Location
- Country: Oman; United Arab Emirates
- Governorate Emirate: Al Buraimi; Ajman; Dubai

Physical characteristics
- Source: Northwestern slope of the Um Alnosoor / Jabal Hatta (1,280 m (4,200 ft))
  - elevation: 1,130 m (3,710 ft) (approximately)
- Mouth: Confluence with the Wadi Hatta, at the Al Khattem Dam, in the enclave of Hatta (Dubai)
  - coordinates: 24°48′48.2522″N 56°08′30.0876″E
  - elevation: 288 m (945 ft)
- Length: 27 km (17 mi)
- Basin size: 548 km^{2} (212 mi^{2})

Basin features
- Progression: Wadi. Intermittent flow
- River system: Wadi Hatta
- Tributaries
  - left: Wadi Laim,
  - right: Wadi Ghalfa / Gulfa, Wadi Al Mustab, Wadi Al Khulaiban, Wadi Lishan, Wadi Hattawi.

Wadi Hadf (Arabic: وادي حدف, romanized: Wādī Ḩadf) is a dry river valley or river valley, with ephemeral or intermittent flow, which flows almost exclusively during the rainy season, located east of the United Arab Emirates, in the enclaves of Masfut (Ajman) and Hatta (Dubai), and north of Oman, in the Al Batinah North Governorate.

It is a left tributary of the Wadi Hatta, to whose extensive 548 km^{2} (212 mi^{2}) drainage basin it belongs.

== Course ==
The total length of the Wadi Hadf is 27 km (17 mi), of which 13 km (8.1 mi) run in Omani territory and 14 km (8.7 mi) in Emirati territory. Its river source is located at an approximate altitude of 1,130 m (3,710 ft), on the northwest slope and a very short distance from the summit of Jabal Hatta, also known as Um Alnosoor (1,280 m (4,200 ft)).

In its upper and middle course the Wadi Hadf flows from southeast to northwest, crossing the steep mountainous area surrounding Jabal Hatta, on both sides of the border between Oman and the United Arab Emirates, until reaching the extensive and rich cultivated area located east of the town of Hadf.

This village, geographically located in the territory of Oman, is administered under an international condominium regime between Oman and the emirate of Ajman.

At that point the Wadi Hadf turns northeast towards the Sinadil Pass through a narrow, steep-sided gorge cut mainly through cemented gravel deposits. However, just above the head of the gorge, the wadi forms a effluent or distributary channel branching off from the main channel and running northwards.

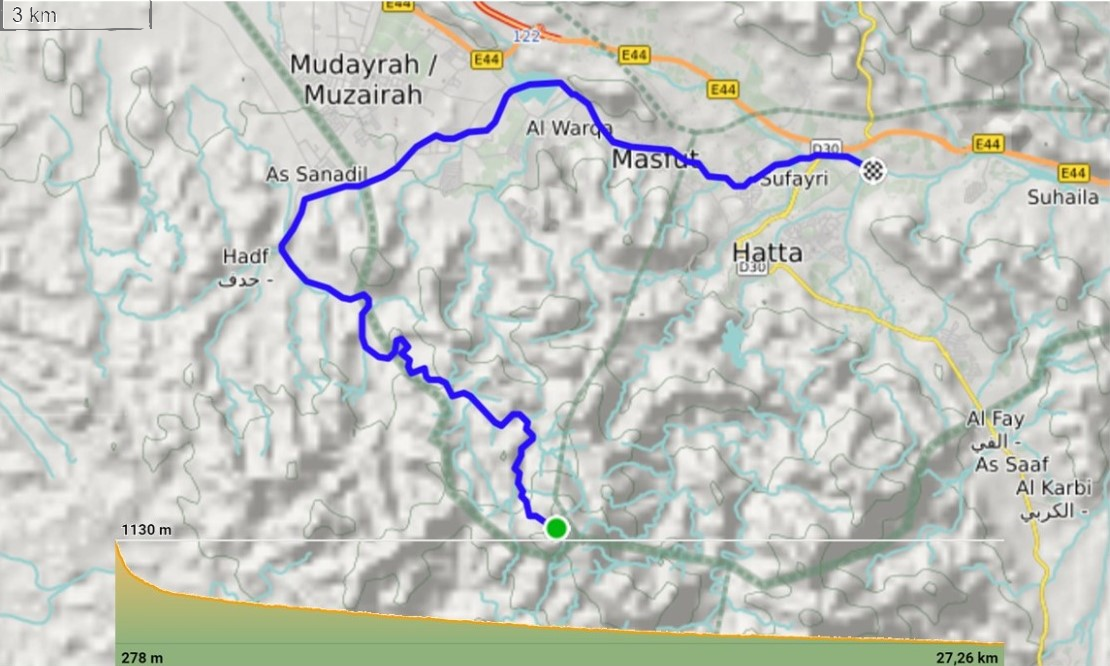
Course chart and elevation profile of Wadi Hadf - Oman and UAE

This second channel is much less visible than the main wadi gorge, because it is shallower and is densely vegetated and used for agricultural crops, but a kilometre downstream of its formation it becomes a complete and well-defined wadi, flowing into the large alluvial plain of Madam (Madam Plain), where it is grouped with other important wadis that drain the western flank of the Hajar Mountains, forming the Wadi Fayah, which once flowed into the Persian Gulf, in the area of the border between Sharjah and Ajman.

This effluent channel drains into a catchment area (Persian Gulf) opposite that of the main wadi (Gulf of Oman), making Wadi Hadf a notable case. This occurs because the location where the wadi emerges from the mountains, with flow during heavy rains, meets the drainage divide between the basins of the Persian Gulf and the Gulf of Oman, allowing the distribution of the water flow. Due to low rainfall, this second channel currently operates as an overflow channel after heavy rain.

At the exit of the spectacular gorge formed by the main channel of Wadi Hadf as it passes through Hadf and Sinadil, the wadi heads northeast across the international dividing line between Oman and the United Arab Emirates, and enters the enclave of Masfut, crossing the great gravel plain of Sayh Muzayri' / Sayḩ Muḑayrah, leaving to the north the urban area of Mudayrah / Muzairah / Muzayri', with its neighborhood of Sayh Al Zahra, and the catchment basin and waterways that flow into the Persian Gulf.

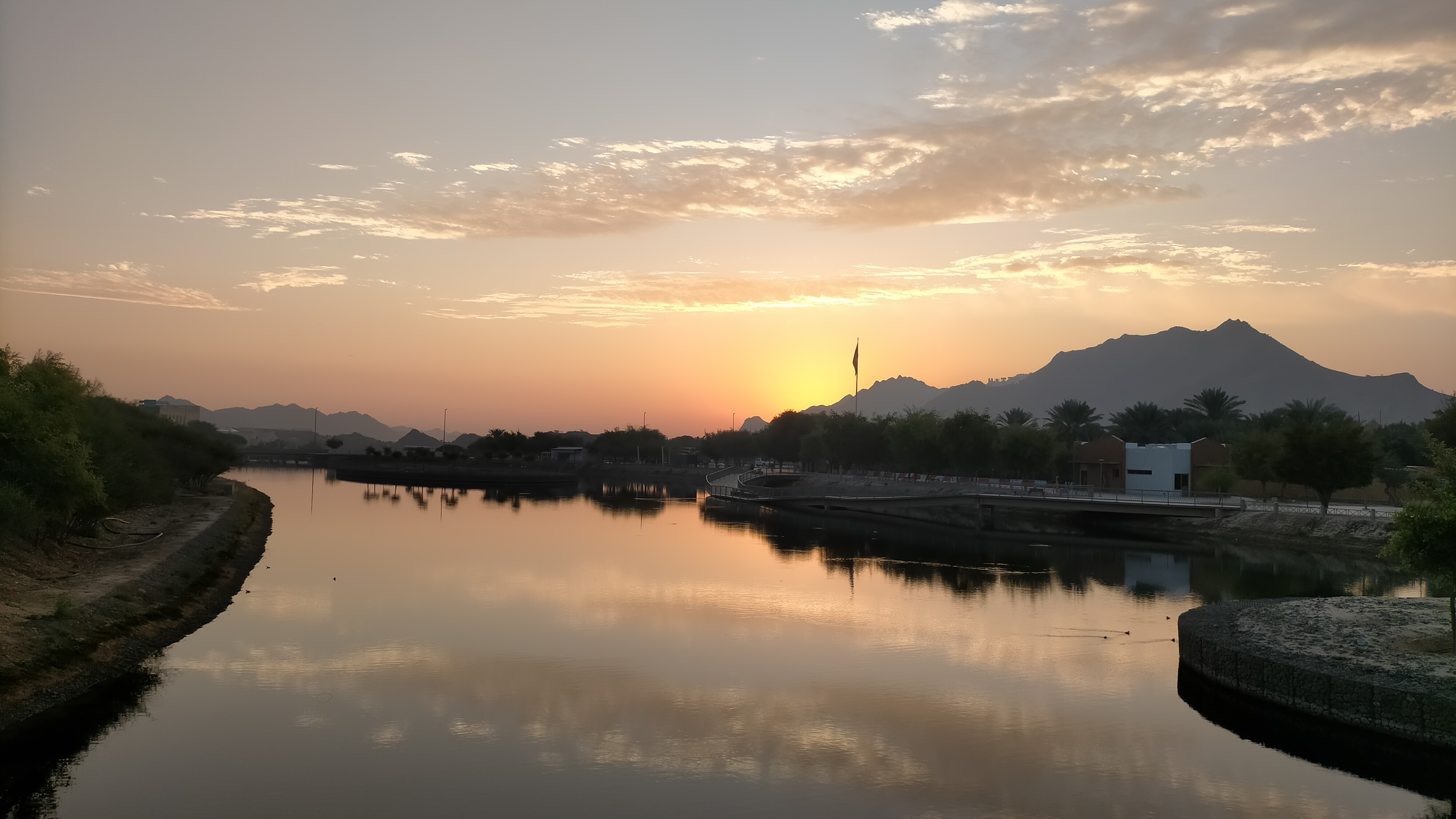
Wadi Hadf (tributary of Wadi Hatta), at the mouth of Wadi Laim, Hatta, Dubai

Upon meeting the natural barrier formed by the mountain ridge of Jabal al Abyad / Jabal al Bayd 559 m (1,834 ft), right at the place occupied by the Hadf Dam dam and reservoir, the wadi turns east-southeast, crossing the old town and current city of Masfut, which concentrates some of its most representative historical buildings (castle and current museum, watchtowers and mosques).

Still in the Masfut enclave, and before continuing its course towards the confluence with the Wadi Hatta, the Wadi Hadf receives on its right the mouth of its tributaries Wadi Gulfa / Ghalfa, Wadi Al Mustab, Wadi Al Khulaiban and Wadi Lishan.

In the territory of the Hatta enclave (Dubai), one and a half kilometers before the Al Khattem Dam, where it joins the Wadi Hatta, the Wadi Hadf receives the waters of its last two tributaries: on the right, the Wadi Hattawi, and on the left, the Wadi Laim.

== Dams and reservoirs ==
Like other regions in the UAE, the Wadi Hadf geographical area has occasionally been affected by unusually heavy rainfall and flooding.

To prevent the risk of flash floods and increase the potential for groundwater recharge, a 11-metre-high dam with a reservoir area of 1.02 km² and a capacity of 3 million cubic metres, officially named Hadf Dam (coordinates: 24°49′38″N, 56°4′34″E), was built in 1991 on the Wadi Hadf river in the emirate of Ajman, although some media refer to it as Al Owais Dam.

Also in the emirate of Ajman, two other smaller dams were built in 2002, in the wadis Al Mustab and Khulaiban, both tributaries of the Wadi Hadf: Al Mustab Dam, 10.5 metres high, with a reservoir of 0.0035 km² and a capacity of 0.0175 million cubic meters (coordinates: 24°48′50″N, 56°5′16″E); and the 7-metre-high Al Khulaiban Dam, with a reservoir of 0.0036 km² and a capacity of 0.0184 million cubic metres (coordinates: 24°48′37″N, 56°5′34″E).

A second dam was built in 2004 on the same Wadi Hadf riverbed, officially called the Muzaira'a Dam, 11 metres high, with a reservoir of 0.028 km² and a capacity of 0.0485 million cubic metres (coordinates: 24°49′5″N, 56°2′53″E).

Finally, already in the territory of the Hatta enclave (Dubai), another large dam called Al Ghabra Dam was built, located at the coordinates: 24°47′44″N, 56°6′36″E, shortly after the confluence of the Wadi al Amed / Wadi Amid with the Wadi Hattawi (tributary of the Wadi Hadf).

== Toponymy ==
Alternative names: Wadi Hadaf, Wadi Hadf, Wādī Ḥadaf, Wādī Ḩadaf, Wādī Ḩadf.

The name of Wadi Hadf (spelled Wādī Ḩadf), its tributaries, mountains and nearby towns was recorded in the documentation and maps produced between 1950 and 1960 by the British Arabist, cartographer, military officer and diplomat Julian F. Walker, during the work carried out to establish the borders between the then called Trucial States, and later completed by the Ministry of Defence of the United Kingdom, on scale maps 1:100,000 published in 1971.

== Population ==
The Wadi Hadf area was mainly populated by the Biduwat tribe.

== See also ==
- Wadi Hatta
- List of wadis of the United Arab Emirates
- List of mountains in the United Arab Emirates
- List of wadis of Oman
- List of mountains in Oman
