= Salacıoğlu =

Turkish Cretan sufi poet

Salacıoğlu (also named in full as Salacıoğlu Mustafa Celveti or Giritli Salacıoğlu Mustafa Celveti, sometimes with the title sheikh added) was a Turkish Cretan sufi poet of the late 18th century and early 19th century, author of one collection of poetry and of two mesnevis. He also used the pen names Salacızade and Salacıdedeoğlu.

Little is known on his life. He was born in Hanya some time before 1756, in which year his father, Sheikh Ahmed Efendi is known to have died, and he died in Kandiye in or some time after 1825, year which is recorded in a number of his late poetry. Through his poems, he is known to have travelled a lot and to have spent a few years in Istanbul, notably under the teaching of another renowned sufi of his time, Haşim Baba of Üsküdar.

Aside from his poetry in the Sufi tradition with a strong lyric touch, an important part of his verses were also intended to mark the foundation dates and other information related to public works (such as schools, fountains, other buildings) following the traditional method of ebced (abjad), a system of enumeration by letters of the Arabic script. His verses composed to correspond with significations according to the ebced system give valuable information on the Turkish society in Crete.

== Poetry ==
Girîdî Hanyavîyem ben Salacıoğlu’dur nâmım
Seyâhat ehliyem bir yerde yok temkîn ü ârâmım
Vücûdum Ka’besine bir erin avniyle yol buldum
Egerçi hacc-ı beyt etdim velî eskitdim ihrâmım
Şarâb-ı vahdetin yek cur’asın nûş eyledim bir dem
İçinde mest olup hâlâ o keyfiyyetle sersâmım
Kurulmuş bezm-i aşk câm-ı mahabbet devr eder bir bir
Demem gel iç bu demden sûfî yokdur sana ibrâmım
Ne tâ’at ne ibâdet kaldı oldum kâfir-i mutlak
O dostun aşkı yağma kıldı zühdüm dînim îmânım
Safâlar vaktidir arz-ı cemâl etdim dem-i nevrûz
Bi-hamdi’llâh irişdi izzet ü rif’atle bayrâmım

Translation:

Salacıoğlu is my name, I am from Hanya in Crete
A man of voyages I am, at no place have I prudence and rest
I found a way to the Kaaba of my being through one's guidance
Thus did I my pilgrimage of the House and my garb did I wear out
I drank for a time one gulp from the wine of existence
In ecstasy as I was within, I am still vertiginous from that state
United in love, I see all passing on its cup and each in turn
Thus I say come and drink this wine, but neither way shall I insist
Since no obedience is left, I for one surely became blasphemous
That One’s love plundered my piety, putting it in shatters
But then our hour is an hour of delights, as appears the time of Nevruz
Praise be to God say I, that my day of feast reached me in glory and might

== Sources ==
- Poetry by Salacıoğlu by the Turkish Ministry of Culture in English, in French, in German
