= Ali Naip Zade =

20th century Greek politician

Ali Naip Zade (Greek: Αλή Ναΐπ Ζαδέ) was a Cretan Muslim who served in high administrative posts in Greece.

== Biography ==
Naip Zade was a personal friend to Eleftherios Venizelos a Liberal Cretan politician and Prime Minister of Greece, Naip Zade was appointed as the first Prefect of Drama and Kavala in 1913 by him. During Greece's expansion in the wake of the Balkan Wars and after World War I Venizelos, anxious to secure the acquiescence to Greek rule the goodwill of the large Muslim populations of Macedonia and Thrace, often appointed Cretan Muslims he knew and trusted to senior administrative posts in areas with a heavy Muslim presence. In 1919, Naip Zade occupied a senior post in the administration of the Smyrna Zone, before being appointed Prefect of Adrianople, and subsequently Prefect of Lasithi in Crete, a post he kept until the compulsory Greco-Turkish population exchange of 1923.

== Sources ==
- Tsitselikis, Konstantinos (2012). Old and New Islam in Greece: From Historical Minorities to Immigrant Newcomers. Studies in International Minority and Group Rights. Martinus Nijhoff Publishers. ISBN 978-90-04-22152-9.
