= Ahmet Yorulmaz =

Ahmet Yorulmaz (1932 – 31 March 2014) was a Turkish journalist, novelist and translator. He was born in Ayvalık to a family of Cretan Turks deported to mainland Turkey as part of the Greek/Turkish population exchange decreed in the Treaty of Lausanne. His best-known novel Savaşın Çocukları (Children of War) deals with the lives of Muslims in Crete before the exchange. He was also translator of Greek literature into Turkish.

== See also ==
- Cretan Turks
- Population exchange between Greece and Turkey
