= Sayh Mudayrah =

Sayh Mudayrah Arabic: سَيْح مُزَيْرَع, romanized: Sayḥ Muzayraʿ
- Village
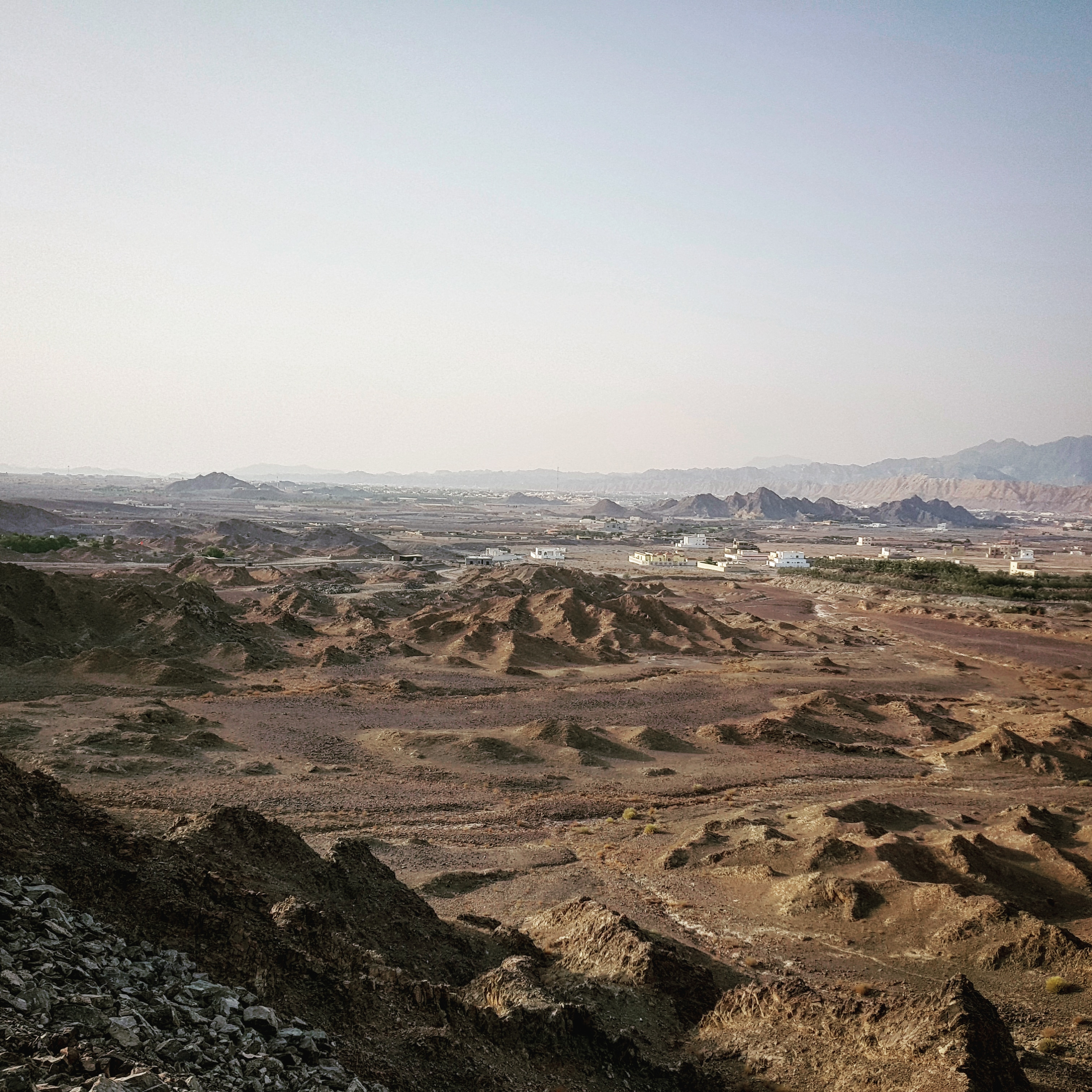
- The Masfout Plain overlooking Sayh Mudayrah, in the region of the Western Hajar Mountains
- Interactive map of Sayh Mudayrah
- Location of Sayh Mudayrah in the UAE
- Coordinates: 24°49′56″N 56°2′22″E
- Country: United Arab Emirates

Government
  - Type: Monarchy
  - Emir: Sheikh Humaid bin Rashid Al Nuaimi III

Sayh Mudayrah, pronounced locally Sayḥ Muzayraʿ (Arabic: سَيْح مُزَيْرَع), is a township in Masfout, an exclave of the Emirate of Ajman, the United Arab Emirates (UAE). It is located on the Madam/Hatta Highway (E44) near the Oman–United Arab Emirates border.

== Description ==
A large village which has developed parallel to the E44, Sayh Mudayrah gives its name to a geological fault line linked to the Hatta fault zone. The village, located on an alluvial fan, is rich in soil, mineral and water resources and its fertile land has long encouraged settlement. It sits on a watershed between the east and west coasts of the UAE, which gives rise to the unusual wadi formation at Sinadil, which sees water flowing from the same spot both West towards the Persian Gulf and East towards the Indian Ocean.

== Gallery ==
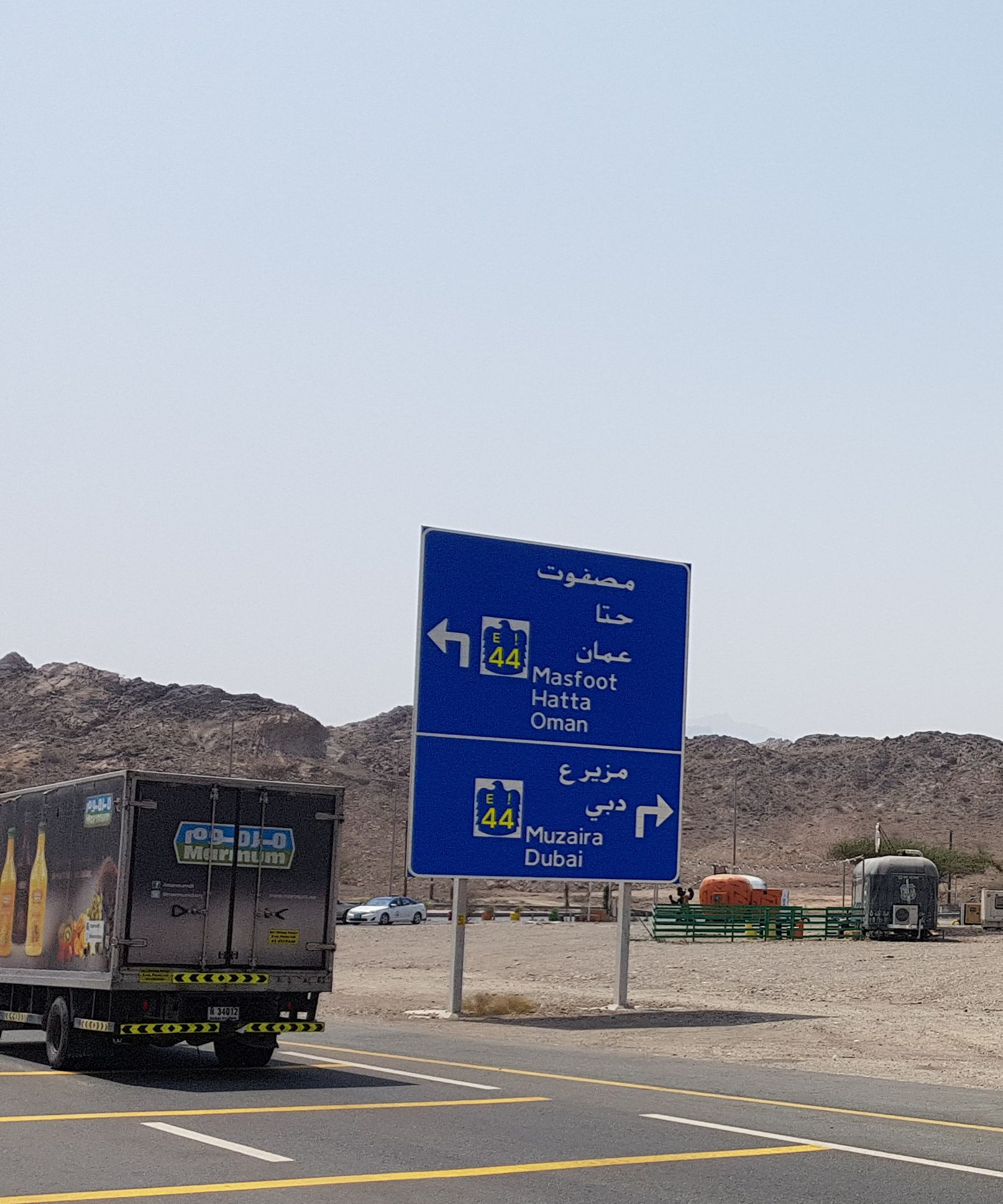
Road sign to Sayh Mudayrah, here given as 'Muzairaʿ'
