= Hamidi =

Hamidi is a surname, derived from the Arabic male given name Hamid. Notable people with the surname include:

- Anwar Maqsood Hameedi (born 1939), Pakistani scriptwriter and television presenter.
- Cheikh Hamidi (born 1983), Algerian footballer
- Elham Hamidi (born 1977), Iranian actress
- Hushang Hamidi, Iranian Kurdish politician
- Javad Hamidi (1918–2002), Iranian painter
- Marzieh Hamidi (born 2002), Iranian-born Afghani taekwondo athlete
- Mohamed Hamidi (1941–2025), Moroccan painter
- Mohsen Hamidi (born 1985), Iranian footballer
