= Hamidiyeh, Kerman =

Hamidiyeh حميديه
- Village
- Location within Iran
- Coordinates: 29°30′32″N 57°35′41″E
- Country: Iran
- Province: Kerman
- County: Kerman
- Bakhsh: Rayen
- Rural District: Rayen

Population (2006)
  - Total: 21
- Time zone: UTC+3:30 (IRST)
  - Summer (DST): UTC+4:30 (IRDT)

Hamidiyeh (Persian: حميديه, also Romanized as Ḩamīdīyeh) is a village in Rayen Rural District, Rayen District, Kerman County, Kerman Province, Iran. At the 2006 census, its population was 21, in 4 families.

Hamid
