= Hamidiyeh, Isfahan =

Hamidiyeh حميديه
- Village
- Country: Iran
- Province: Isfahan
- County: Natanz
- Bakhsh: Central
- Rural District: Karkas

Population (2006)
  - Total: 31
- Time zone: UTC+3:30 (IRST)
  - Summer (DST): UTC+4:30 (IRDT)

Hamidiyeh (Persian: حميديه, also Romanized as Ḩamīdīyeh) is a village in Karkas Rural District, in the Central District of Natanz County, Isfahan Province, Iran. At the 2006 census, its population was 31, in 7 families.
