= Mustafa Olpak =

Afro-Turkish writer and activist

Mustafa Olpak (October 1953 in Ayvalık - 4 October 2016 in İzmir) was an Afro-Turkish writer and activist. His book Kenya-Girit-İstanbul: Köle Kıyısından İnsan Biyografileri has been compared to Alex Haley's Roots.

== Biography ==
Olpak's ancestors, of Kikuyu ethnicity from today's Kenya, were enslaved around the year 1890, brought to Crete and sold in Rethymno. Following the population exchange between Greece and Turkey, the family settled in Ayvalık. Olpak married a Turkish woman named Sevgi in İzmir after his military service.

In 2006, Olpak founded the first officially recognised organisation of Afro-Turks, the Africans' Culture and Solidarity Society (Afrikalılar Kültür ve Dayanışma Derneği) in Ayvalık. The opening ceremony was attended by Ali Moussa Iye, the Chief of UNESCO Slave Routes Project. A principal aim of the association is to promote studies of oral history of Afro-Turks, a community history of whom was usually ignored by official historiography in Turkey.

The Turkish film Arap Kızı Camdan Bakıyor ("The Arab Girl Looks from the Window," released with the English title of Baa Baa Black Girl) discusses how his grandfather was purchased as a household slave by a Turkish family, but later moved to Istanbul after the Turkish Revolution.

== Bibliography ==
- Tariş Direnişleri ve 12 Eylül (Tariş Resistances and 12 September), with Sevgi Olpak
- Kölelikten Özgürlüğe: Arap Kadın Kemale (From Slavery to Freedom: "Arab" Woman Kemale) 2002
- Kenya-Girit-İstanbul: Köle Kıyısından İnsan Biyografileri (Kenya-Crete-İstanbul: Human Biographies from the Slave Coast), İstanbul, Ozan Yayıncılık, 2005 ISBN 975-7891-80-0
  - Kenya-Crète-Istanbul: Biographie d'une famille d'esclaves, Paris, Librairie Özgül, 2006 ISBN 978-2-910901-02-8

== Filmography ==
- Arap Kızı Camdan Bakıyor ("The Arab Girl Looks from the Window," released in English as Baa Baa Black Girl), Director:, Narrator: Mustafa Olpak, 46', 2007, Turkey
