= Hamidiye =

Hamidiye may refer to:

- Hamidiye (cavalry), irregular Ottoman cavalry units established in 1890
- Ottoman cruiser Hamidiye, a warship of the Balkan wars and World War I
- Hamidiye, Bigadiç, a village
- Hamidiye, Bolvadin, a village in the District of Bolvadin, Afyonkarahisar Province, Turkey
- Hamidiye, Ceyhan, a village in the District of Ceyhan, Adana Province, Turkey
- Hamidiye, Nurdağı, a village in the Nurdağı District, Gaziantep Province, Turkey
- Hamidiye, Pozantı, a village in the District of Pozantı, Adana Province, Turkey
- Mesudiye, Ordu, former name

== See also ==
- Hamidi (disambiguation)
- Hamidiyah
- Hamidiyeh
- Al-Hamidiyah a town in Syria
