= Hamidiyeh, Hoveyzeh =

Hamidiyeh حميديه
- Village
- Location within Iran
- Coordinates: 31°24′44″N 48°00′45″E
- Country: Iran
- Province: Khuzestan
- County: Hoveyzeh
- Bakhsh: Central
- Rural District: Hoveyzeh

Population (2006)
  - Total: 135
- Time zone: UTC+3:30 (IRST)
  - Summer (DST): UTC+4:30 (IRDT)

Hamidiyeh (Persian: حميديه, also Romanized as Ḩamīdīyeh) is a village in Hoveyzeh Rural District, in the Central District of Hoveyzeh County, Khuzestan Province, Iran. At the 2006 census, its population was 135, in 27 families.
