= Al Hamidiyah, Ajman =

Al Hamidiyah
- Location within United Arab Emirates
- Coordinates: 25°23′30″N 55°31′48″E
- Country: United Arab Emirates
- Emirate: Ajman
- Elevation: 14 m (45 ft)

Al Hamidiyah (Arabic: الحمیدیة) is the name of a suburb in Ajman.
