= Hadf =

- Village
- Location in Oman
- Coordinates: 24°47′41″N 56°0′40″E
- Country: Oman
- Region: Al Buraimi Governorate
- Time zone: UTC+4 (Oman Standard Time)

Hadf is a village in Al Buraimi Governorate, in northeastern Oman. For several decades it was administered as a condominium with certain rights held by the bordering Emirate of Ajman.

Hadf, a small area on the Arabian Peninsula, a part of Oman, at one time was jointly ruled with the Emirati member state of Ajman. The agreement defining the Hadf zone was signed in Salalah on 26 April 1960 by Sultan Said bin Taimur and in Ajman on 30 April 1960 by Shaikh Rashid bin Humaid Al Nuaimi, ruler of Ajman. This provided for some joint supervision in the zone by the ruler of Ajman and the shaikhs under the rule of Muscat. It allowed the Ajman ruler to continue collecting zakat (Islamic tax). The ruler of Ajman was, however, not to interfere in the affairs of the local people, the Bani Ka'ab (a branch of the Banu Kaab), which were the sole responsibility of shaikhs who were under Muscat rule. In the 1980s, the ruler of Ajman, Shaikh Humaid bin Rashid al Nuaimi, transferred the area to Sultan Qaboos of Oman.

== Toponymy ==
Alternative Names: Hadaf, Hadf, Hadhf, Hadi, hdf, حدف, Ḥadaf, Ḩadaf, Ḩadf, Ḩadhf
