= Al-Hamidiyah =

Al-Hamidiyah الحميدية Χαμιδιέ
- Town
- Location in Syria
- Coordinates: 34°43′N 35°56′E
- Country: Syria
- Governorate: Tartus
- District: Tartus
- Subdistrict: El-Hamidiyeh

Population (2004)
  - Total: 7,404
- Time zone: UTC+03:00 (AST)

Al-Hamidiyah (Arabic: الحميدية, Greek: Χαμιδιέ) is a town on the Syrian coast. The town was founded in a very short time on the direct orders of the Ottoman Sultan Abdülhamit II around 1897, to serve as a refuge for the Greek-speaking Muslim Cretan community, forced to leave Crete during the 1897–98 Greco-Turkish War and resettled by the Sultan in Hamidiyeh and other coastal areas of the Levant and as far as Libya. The majority still speak Cretan Greek in their daily lives. According to the Syria Central Bureau of Statistics, el-Hamidiyeh had a population of 7,404 in the 2004 census.

== Cretan community ==
Cretan Muslims constitute 60% of the population, numbering about 3,000. Records suggest that the community left Crete between 1866 and 1897, on the outbreak of the last Cretan uprising against the Ottoman Empire, which ended with the Greco-Turkish War of 1897. Sultan Abdul Hamid II provided Cretan Muslim families who fled the island with refuge on the Levantine coast. The new settlement was named Hamidiye after the sultan. The community is very much concerned with maintaining its culture. The knowledge of the spoken Greek language is remarkably good and their contact with their historical homeland has been possible by means of satellite television and relatives.

Today, the Grecophone residents identify themselves as Cretan Muslims, and not as Cretan Turks as is the case with some in Tripoli.
