= Masfout =

Masfout مصفوت
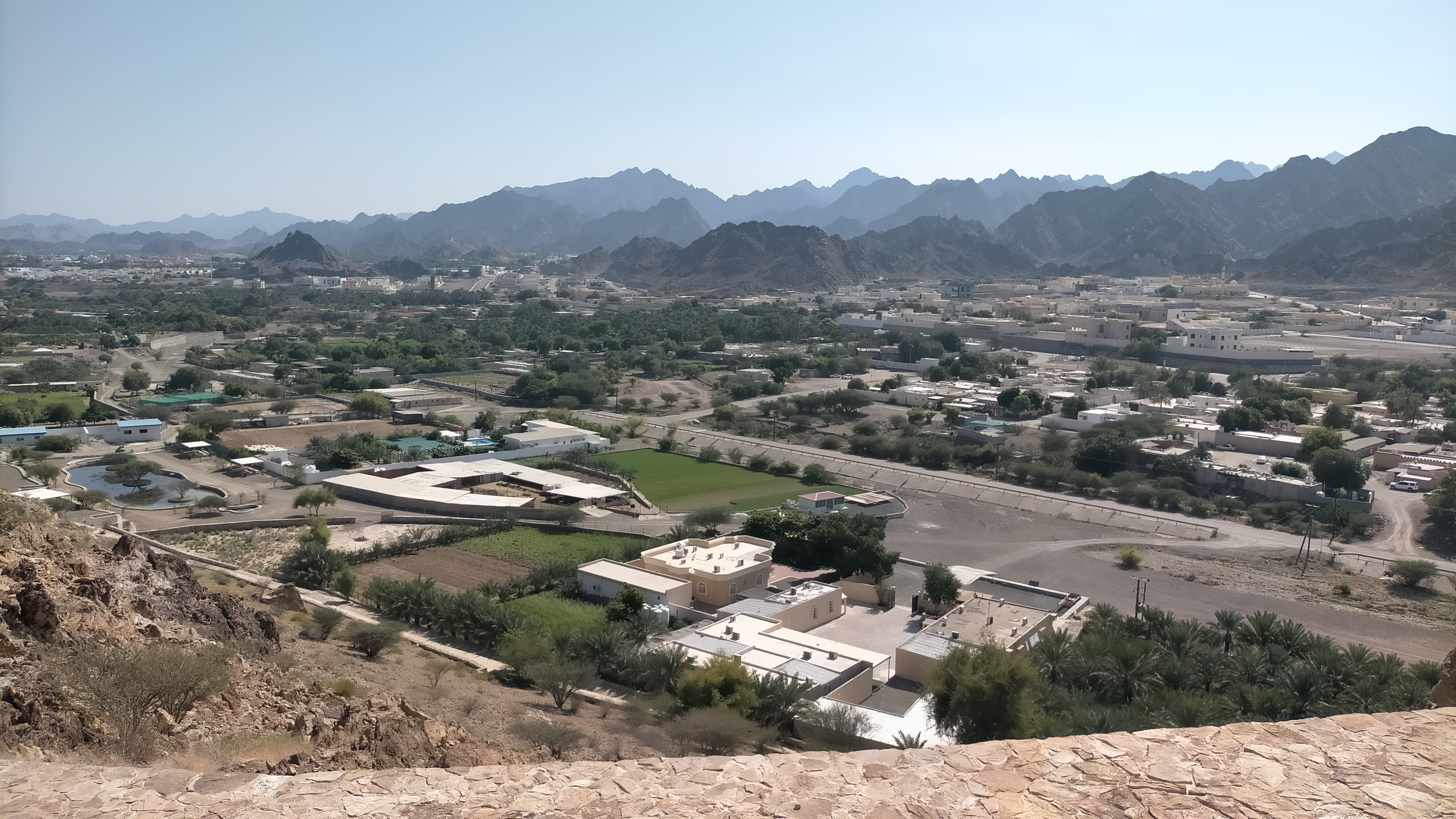
- Interactive map of Masfout
- Location within United Arab Emirates
- Coordinates: 24°48′54″N 56°5′52″E
- Country: United Arab Emirates
- Emirate: Ajman

Area
  - Land: 86.59 km^{2} (33.43 sq mi)
- Elevation: 387 m (1,269 ft)

Population (2017)
  - Total: 8,988
  - Density: 103.8/km^{2} (269/sq mi)

Masfout is a village that forms part of the eponymous exclave of Masfout in the Emirate of Ajman, one of the seven emirates forming the United Arab Emirates. It is surrounded by Ras Al Khaimah, the Dubai exclave of Hatta and Oman (Mahdha Wilayat of Al Buraimi Governorate). It is only accessible from Ajman itself by crossing territories of Sharjah, Ras Al Khaimah, and Oman.

At the census of 2017 the city had a population 8988 on an area of 86.59 km^{2}, which corresponds to a population density of 103.8 per km^{2}.

The village has a number of government facilities and municipal centres, including a dedicated courthouse built in 2017. The 13,500 square metre Waraqa Park surrounds the former house of the founder of Ajman, Sheikh Rashid bin Humaid Al Nuaimi.

In 2017 the Masfout Heights Resort Project was announced, intended as a mixed use hotel and tourism project. Digging water wells in the exclave was banned by the Ajman government as water depletion became an issue with over 80 unregulated wells sunk into the area's aquifers.

In 2025 Masfout was named the (Best Tourist Village in the World) by UN.

Masfout is home to UAE Division One football club Masfout CFC.

Masfout Fort is located on the craggy mountains above the village, restored in the 1940s by Sheikh Rashid bin Humaid. It was originally intended to protect against bandits heading to Oman. The village is also home to the 1815 Bin Sultan Mosque.

The nearby village forming the other densely inhabited part of the exclave is Sayh Mudayrah.

== History ==
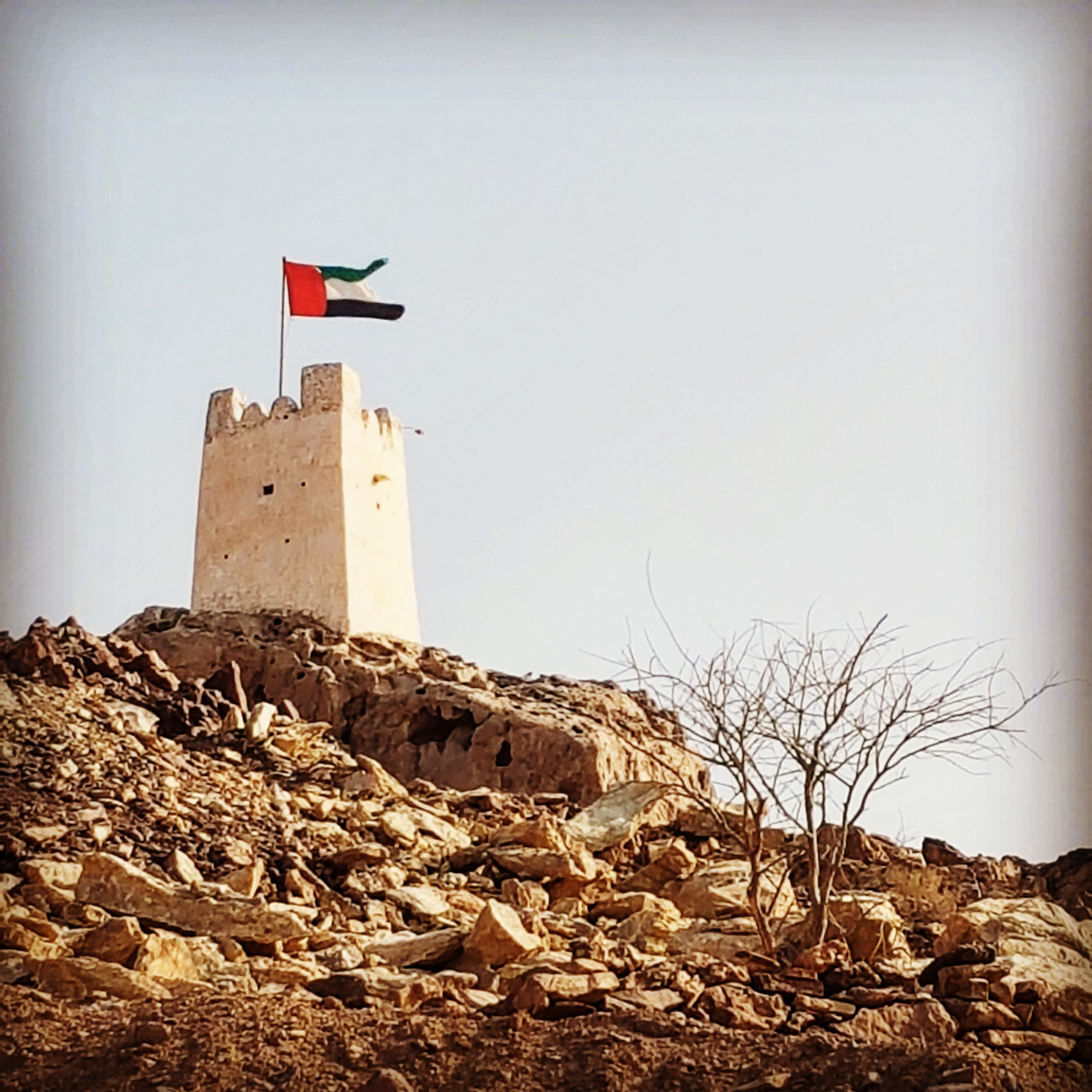
Masfout Fort, overlooking the town of Masfout, Ajman, UAE.

Masfout was traditionally home to the Na'im tribe, who were originally in the main settled in Buraimi. They found themselves under threat in 1905 when the Bedouin Bani Qitab built a fort at Wadi Hatta and started to harass caravans passing through the pass to the Omani Batina coast.

Appealing to Zayed bin Khalifa Al Nahyan of Abu Dhabi, and following a meeting of the Trucial Sheikhs in Dubai in April of that year, they gained Zayed's support (against the dynamic and ambitious Sheikh of Umm Al Quwain, Sheikh Rashid bin Ahmad Al Mualla, who supported the Bani Qitab) and eventually retained Masfout. The Na'im of Masfout were in almost constant conflict with their neighbours, the people of Hajarain, which later became a dependency of Dubai and more commonly known as Hatta.

In 1948, following a period of decline for the Na'im, Masfout was seized from its Na'im Sheikh, Saqr bin Sultan Al Hamouda, by Sheikh Rashid bin Humaid Al Nuaimi III of Ajman when Hamouda was unable to raise a force of men to oppose Rashid.

A period of uncertainty followed as the various Sheikhs of the region attempted to jostle for influence in order to sign petroleum concessions, with the Sultan in Muscat and the Saudis paying tribute in return for fealty which often turned out to be short-lived from both the Bani Qitab and the Na'im, as well as other tribes of the interior of the Trucial States.

These attempts to harness title to areas of the interior among the rulers and tribes eventually led to the Buraimi Dispute.

Masfout has been part of the Emirate of Ajman since.

== Gallery ==
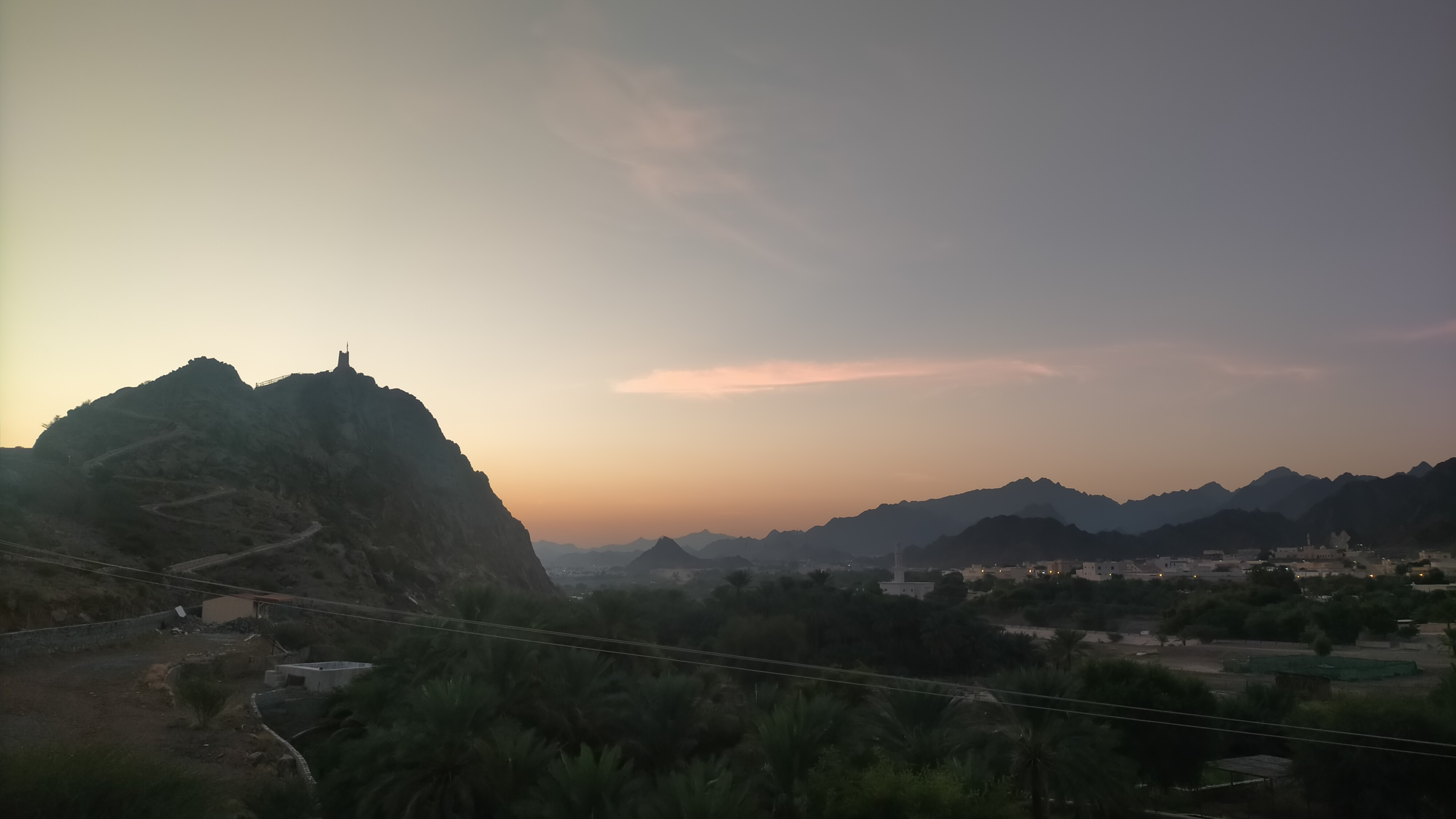

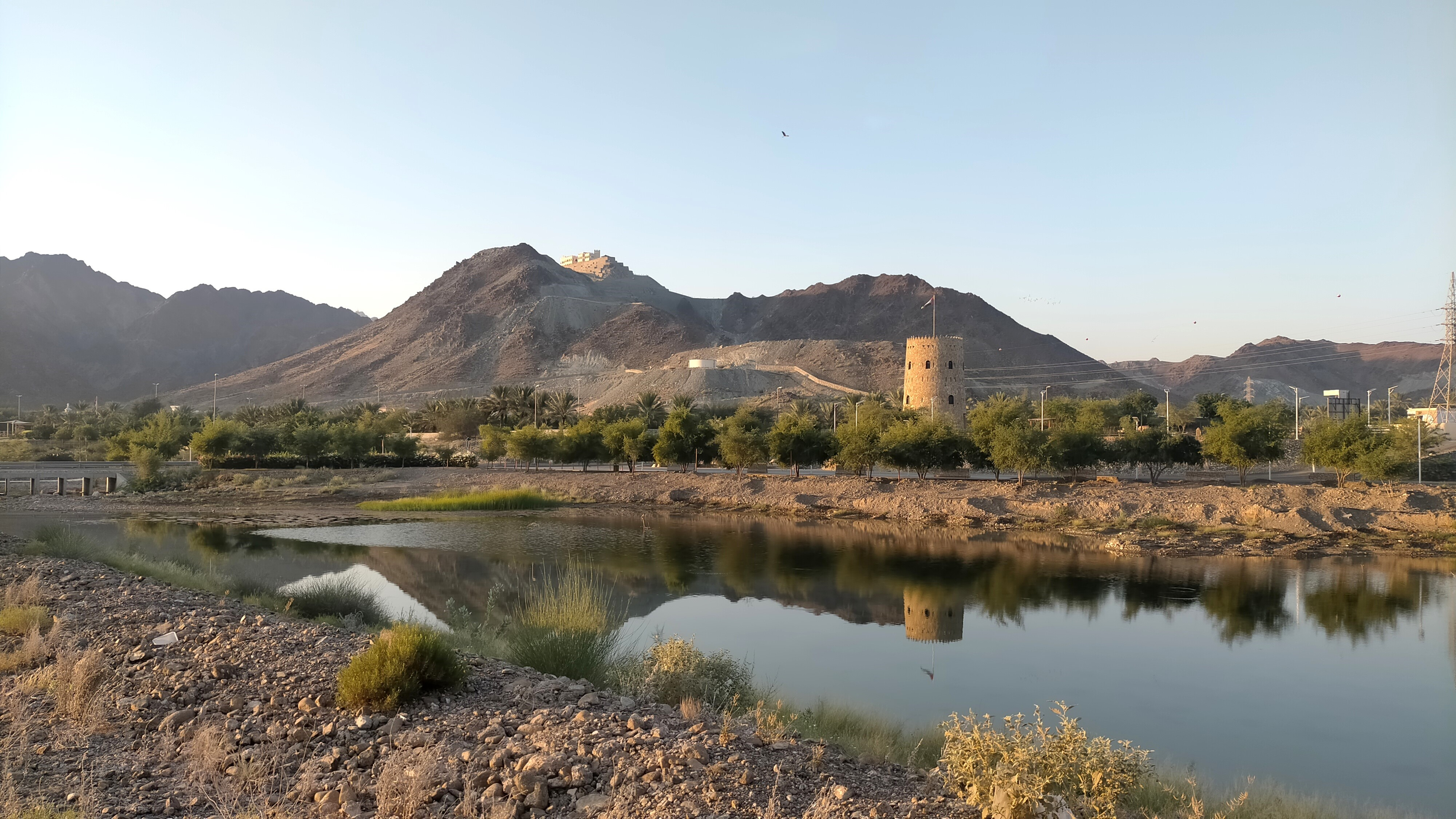

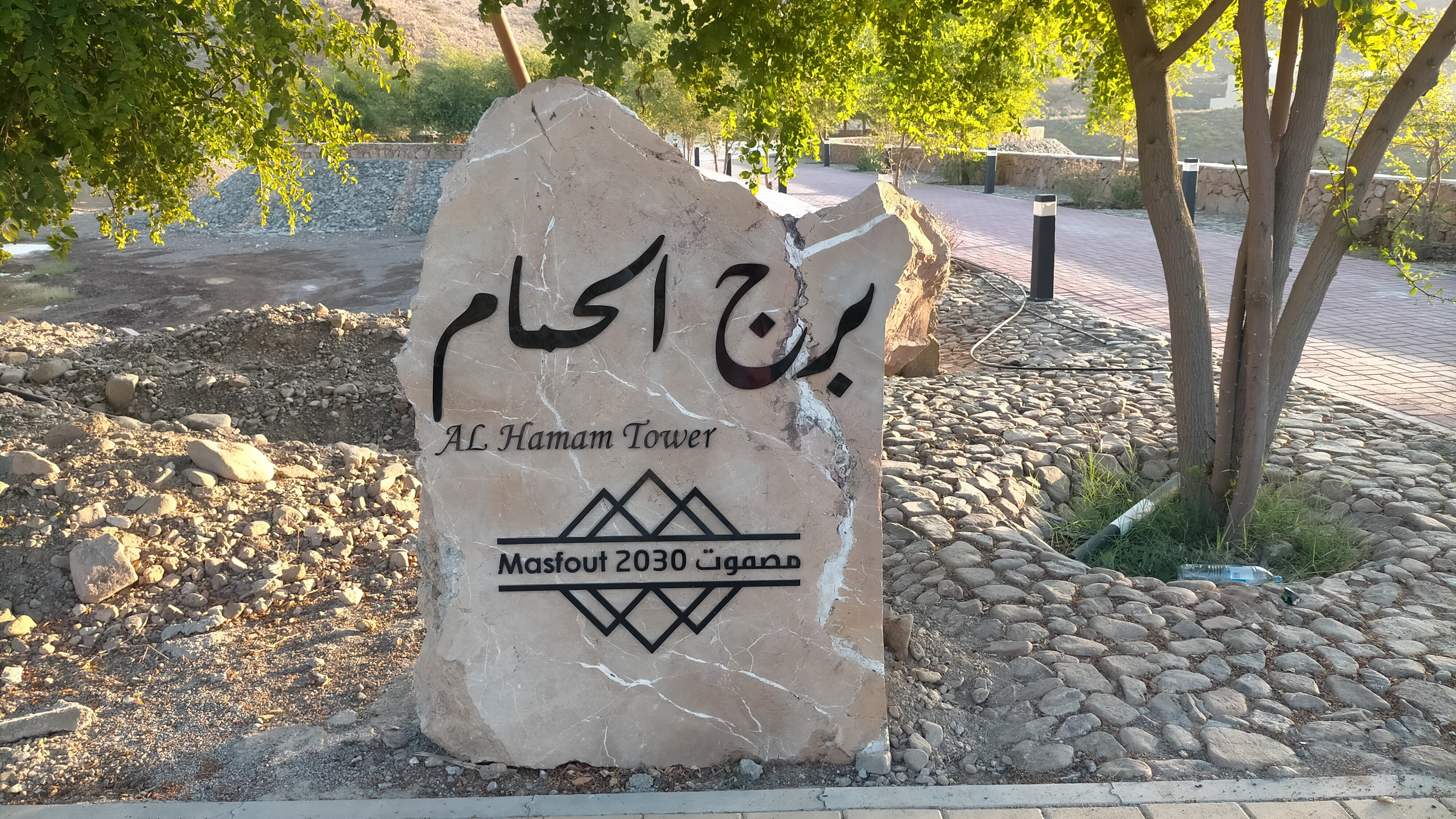

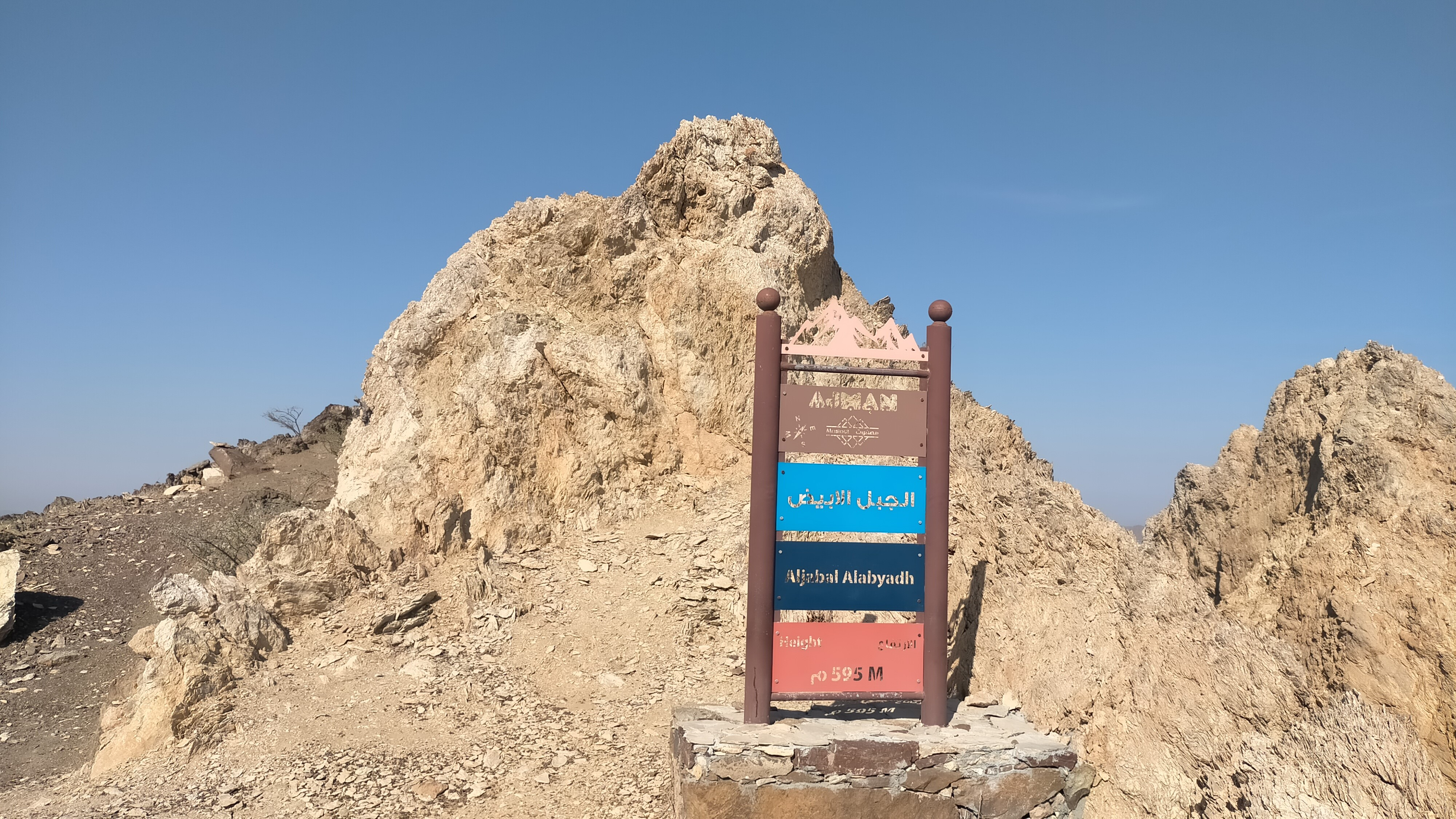

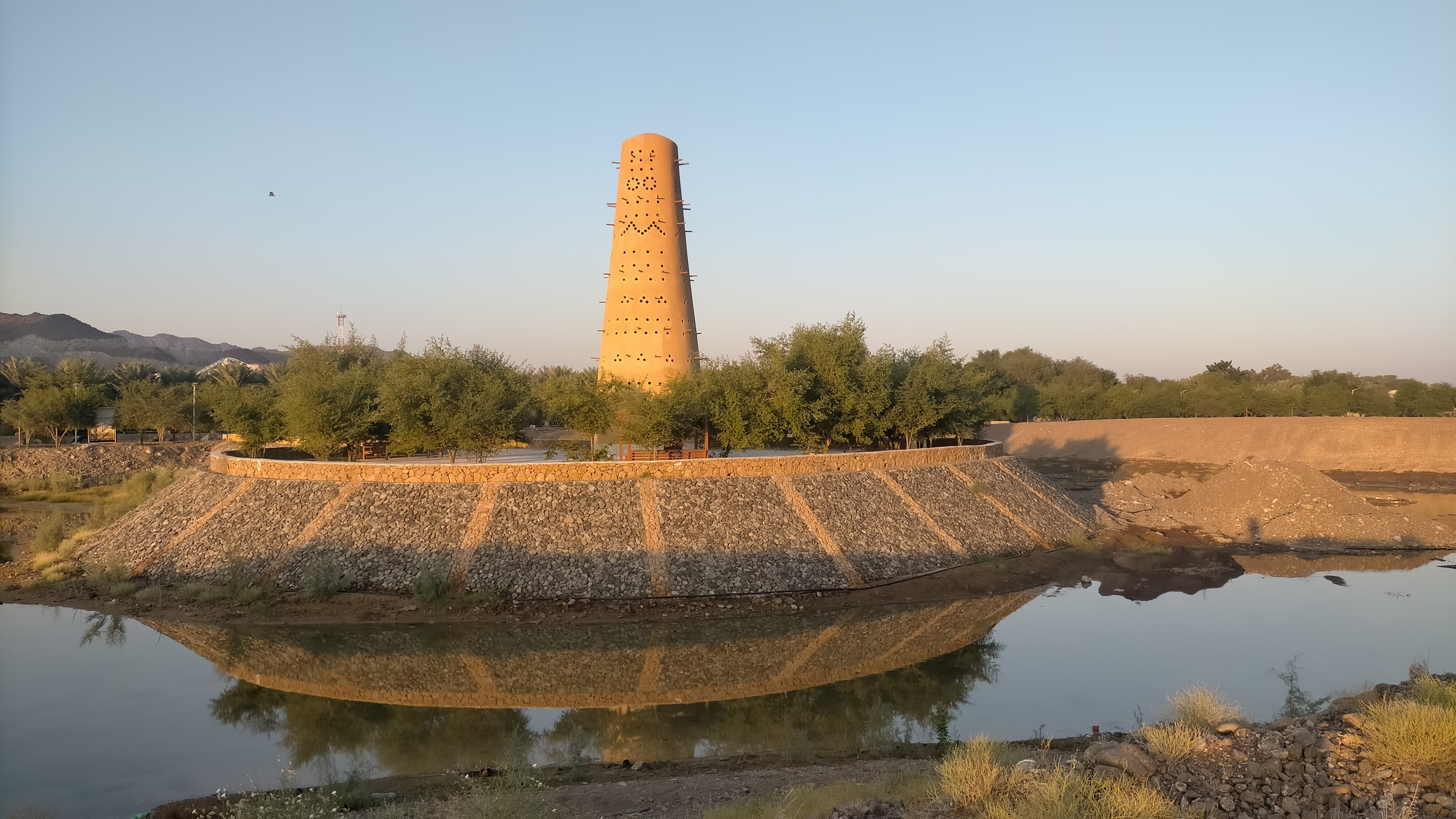

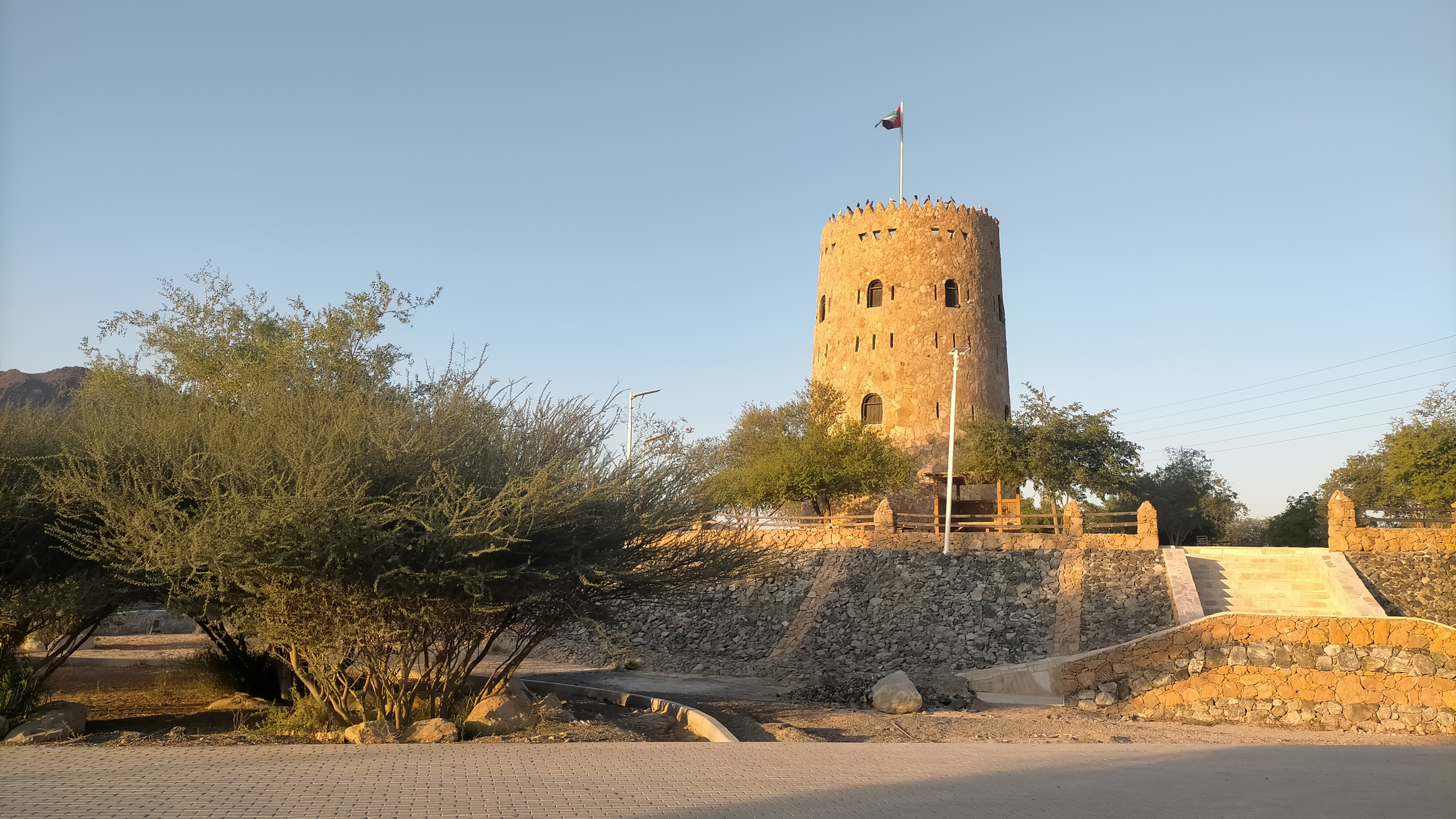
