= Government of Ajman =

Government of the Emirate of Ajman

Government of Ajman حكومة عجمان
- Emirate: Emirate of Ajman
- Country: United Arab Emirates
- Website: ajman.ae

Head of Government
- Ruler of Ajman: Humaid bin Rashid Al Nuaimi III

Executive Authority
- Chairman: Ammar bin Humaid Al Nuaimi
- Main body: Ajman Executive Council
- Appointed by: Ruler of Ajman

The Government of Ajman (Arabic: حكومة عجمان) is the subnational authority that governs the Emirate of Ajman, one of the seven constituent monarchies which make up the United Arab Emirates. The Government of Ajman is headed by the ruler of Ajman, currently Sheikh Humaid bin Rashid Al Nuaimi III. The ruler appoints the members of the Ajman Executive Council, who oversee the various agencies of the emirate. Ajman has no local judicial authority, and instead follows the federal justice system of the UAE; all emirates have the choice of establishing local court systems according to the UAE Constitution.

== Organization ==
The Emirate of Ajman is an absolute monarchy headed by the ruler of Ajman.

=== Departments and agencies ===
Ajman Police Force

Ajman Real Estate Regulatory Agency

Ajman Transport Authority

Department of Digital Ajman

Department of Economic Development

Department of Finance

Department of Human Resources

Department of Justice and Courts

Department of Municipalities and Planning

Department of Ports and Customs

Department of Tourism Development

== Ajman Executive Council ==
Ajman Executive Council was established in 2003 by an Amiri decree, the council is the legislative arm of the government of Ajman, it carries out the ruler's decrees, the chairman of the council is appointed by the ruler. As of May 2026, the council has 17 member, currently the council is chaired by the Crown Prince of Ajman, Sheikh Ammar bin Humaid Al Nuaimi.

Number	Name	Position	Notable duties
1	Sheikh Ammar bin Humaid Al Nuaimi	Chairman	Crown Prince of Ajman
2	Sheikh Ahmed bin Humaid Al Nuaimi	Vice Chairman of the Executive Council	
3	Sheikh Abdulaziz bin Humaid Al Nuaimi	Council Member	Head of the Department of Land & Real Estate Regulation
4	Sheikh Rashid bin Humaid Al Nuaimi	Council Member	Chairman of the Municipality and Planning Department in Ajman
5	Sheikh Dr. Majid Bin Saeed Al Nuaimi	Council Member	Chairman of Ajman Ruler's Court
6	Sheikh Mohammed bin Ali Al Nuaimi	Council Member	Chairman of the Justice and Courts Department in Ajman
7	H.E Major-General Sheikh Sultan bin Abdullah Al Nuaimi	Council Member	Commander-in-Chief of Ajman Police
8	Sheikh Mohammed bin Abdullah Al Nuaimi	Council Member	Chairman of the Ports and Customs Department in Ajman
9	H.E Abdullah Mohammed Al Muwaiji	Council Member	Chairman of Ajman Chamber of Commerce and Industry
10	H.E Abdulrahman Mohammed Al Nuaimi	Council Member	Director General of the Municipality and Planning Department
11	H.E Omar Ahmed bin Omair Al Muhairi	Council Member	Director General of the Land and Real Estate Regulation Department
12	H.E Marwan Ahmed Al Ali	Council Member	Director General of the Ajman Department of Finance
13	Rashid Abdulrahman bin Jabran Al Suwaidi	Council Member	Director General of the Human Resources Department
14	H.E Omar Mohammed Lootah	Council Member	Director General, of the Transport Authority
15	H.E Abdullah Ahmed Saif Al Hamrani	Council Member	Director General of the Economic Development Department
16	H.E Mahmoud Khalil Al Hashimi	Council Member	Director General of the Tourism Development Department in Ajman
17	H.E Dr. Ohood Ali Shuhail	Council Member	General Director of Ajman Digital Department
