= Rashid bin Humaid Al Nuaimi Award =

Rashid bin Humaid Award for Culture and Science
- Awarded for: Outstanding works in culture and science, promoting Islamic values.
- Description: An Emirati award for culture and science.
- Sponsored by: Humaid bin Rashid Al Nuaimi
- Country: United Arab Emirates
- Established: 1983
- First award: 1983
- Website: https://rsh-award.org.ae/home

The Rashid bin Humaid Award for Culture and Science is an Emirati award established in 1983 under the patronage of Sheikh Humaid bin Rashid Al Nuaimi, Ruler of Ajman. It was created to commemorate his father, Sheikh Rashid bin Humaid Al Nuaimi, who was a lover of knowledge and its patrons. The award is dedicated to spreading knowledge based on a deep faith in God and a pride in the timeless values and rich history of Islamic civilization.

== History ==
The Umm Al Moumineen Women's Association in Ajman supervises the organization of the award, and has administered it since its inception in 1983.

On November 9, 1992, the patron of the award, Sheikh Humaid bin Rashid Al Nuaimi, issued a decree to form a Board of Trustees for the award. The board includes a number of prominent community leaders with educational and academic expertise to supervise the award, manage its affairs, and monitor its development in accordance with its vision and objectives.

== Vision and objectives ==
The main objectives of the Rashid bin Humaid Award for Culture and Science are to achieve distinguished cultural development and enrich cultural life by supporting scientific research. The award also aims to encourage researchers and creators to produce original works, and to disseminate specialized studies and creative endeavors. Additionally, it seeks to facilitate communication with other relevant awards and institutions.
