= Ajman Museum =

Museum in Ajman, United Arab Emirates

- متحف عجمان
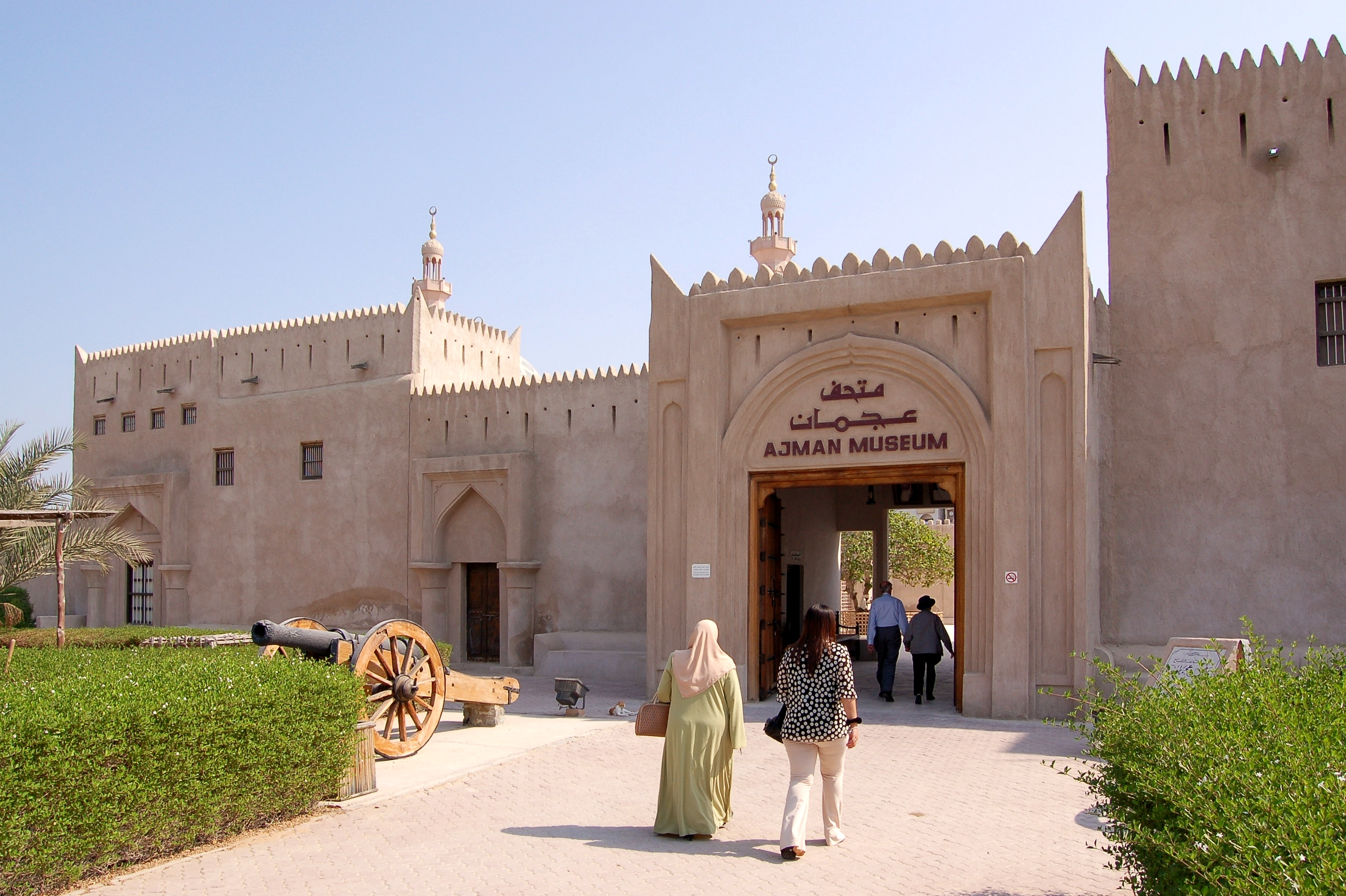
- The museum's entrance in 2007
- Established: 20 May 1991
- Location: Ajman Fort
- Coordinates: 25°24′49″N 55°26′44″E
- Type: National museum
- Founder: Sheikh Humaid bin Rashid Al Nuaimi
- Owner: Emirate of Ajman

The Ajman Museum (Arabic: متحف عجمان) is a national museum located inside the Ajman Fort in the city of Ajman, United Arab Emirates. The museum includes several sections that offer a compelling glimpse of Ajman's past, including archaeology, manuscripts, folk costumes, souvenirs, and more. The museum displays are annotated in both Arabic and English.

It is housed in an 18th-century fortress that was used as a stronghold for the Emirates leadership and as the first line of defense. Earlier it was the ruler's palace and then it was converted as the Ajman police station. When the fort was renovated two wind towers and two watchtowers were maintained. A massive gate and two cannons can be seen on the front of the fort. The museum tells about the local history and heritage, the place highlights various aspects of the past. The Ajman Museum with displays of lifestyle and traditional professions includes a huge collection of archeological artifacts, manuscripts, and old weapons as well as displays of medical and religious practices are on display.

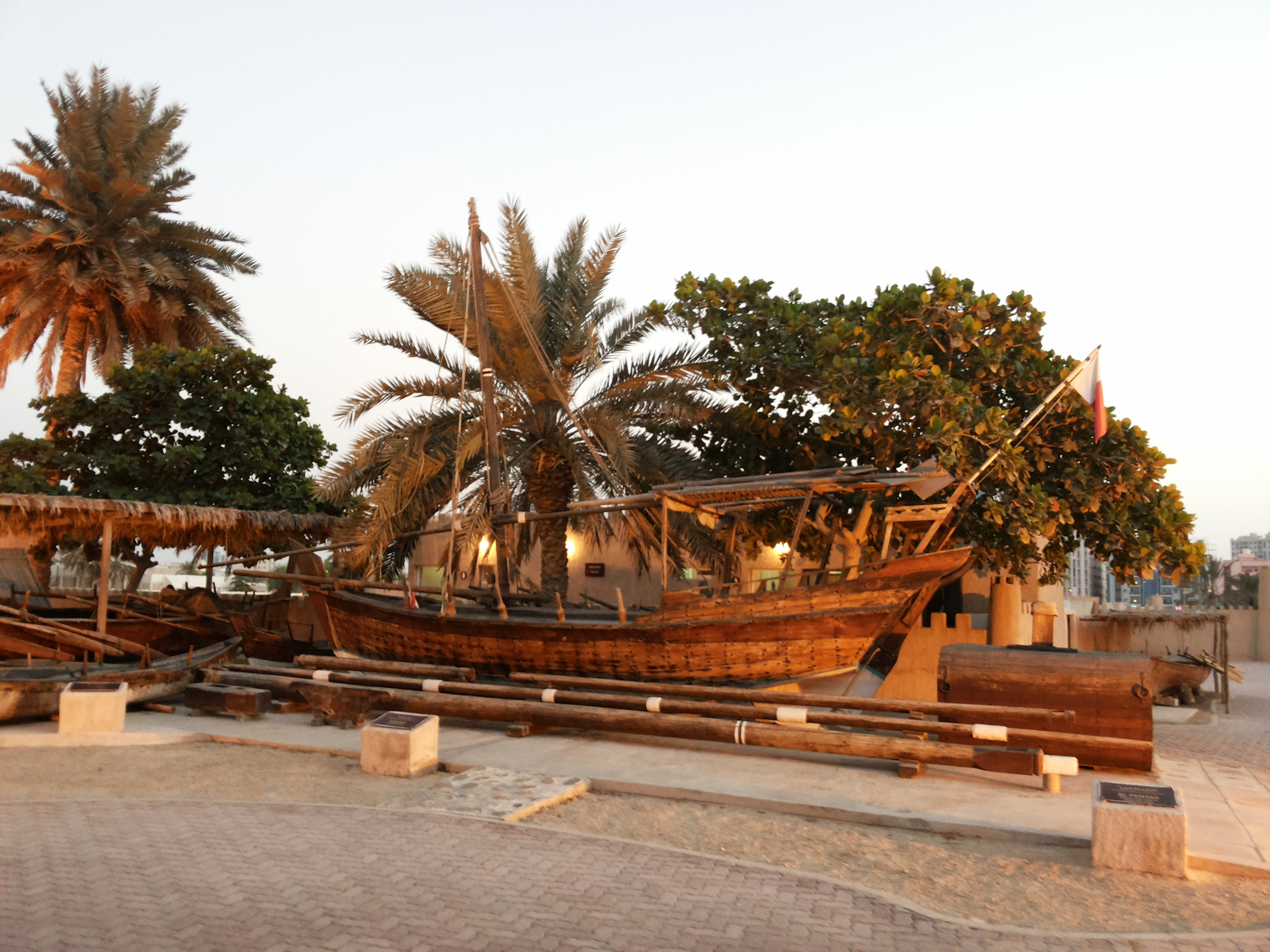
Ship at Ajman Museum

One of the most famous displays is an excavated cemetery discovered in the Al Muwaihat area, which features pottery and funeral jewellery dating back as far as 3000 BC. This was a former fishing village, Ajman also relied heavily on pearl fishing and there is a section specifically devoted to what was once one of the most important pastimes in the region.

== Location ==
The museum is located in the centre of Ajman, on the east side of the central square in the Al Bustan area, opposite to Gold Souq and Traditional Souq Saleh and 300 meters away from Ajman Bus Station. The museum is walking distance from Ajman corniche. Ajman Tourism Development Department (ATDD) is the principal authority tasked with the strategic planning, development and promotion of Ajman Museum. ATDD proposes legislation, rules and also regulations aimed at developing the tourism sector in Ajman, working in cooperation with other government authorities. The department is responsible for promoting Ajman locally, regionally and internationally via conferences, exhibitions and promotional campaigns.

== History of the fort ==
It is not known exactly when the fort was built, although it was probably built in the late 18th century.

The fort was followed by the operations of Ajman for the period (1970-1981).
