= Emirate of Ajman =

Emirate of the United Arab Emirates

Ajman إِمَارَة عَجْمَان ʼImāra(t) ʻAǧmān
- Emirate
- Emirate of Ajman
- Flag Coat of arms

- Location of Ajman in the UAE
- Interactive map of Ajman
- Coordinates: 25°25′N 55°30′E
- Country: United Arab Emirates
- Subdivisions: Towns and villages: Ajman; Masfout; Al Manama

Government
  - Type: Islamic absolute monarchy within a federation
  - Ruler: Humaid bin Rashid Al Nuaimi III
  - Crown Prince: Ammar bin Humaid Al Nuaimi

Area
  - Total: 259 km^{2} (100 sq mi)
  - Rank: 7th

Population (2024)
  - Total: 582,852
  - Rank: 4th
- Demonym: Ajmani

GDP
  - Total: US$ 10.9 billion (2023)
  - Per capita: US$ 22,600 (2023)
- Time zone: UTC+4 (UAE Standard Time)
- ISO 3166 code: AE-AJ

The Emirate of Ajman (Arabic: إمارة عجمان ʼImāra(t) ʻAǧmān, pronounced [ʔɪ.maː.ra(t) ʕad͡ʒ.maːn]) is one of the seven emirates of the United Arab Emirates. It joined the United Arab Emirates federation on December 2, 1971. It has an area of 259 square kilometers (100 sq mi), which makes it the smallest of the emirates in area, while its population of approximately 582,852 in 2024 makes it the fourth most populous emirate. It is named after the city of Ajman, which is its seat of government. The main landmass of the emirate is a semi-enclave, surrounded on the north, east, and south by the Emirate of Sharjah.

Located on the coast of the Persian Gulf, Ajman also controls two small inland exclaves: Manama and Masfout, both of which are primarily agricultural. Approximately 95% of the population of the emirate resides in the city of Ajman, which forms part of the Dubai-Sharjah-Ajman metropolitan area. Ajman is ruled by Sheikh Humaid bin Rashid Al Nuaimi III of the Na'im tribe. The Crown Prince of the emirate is Sheikh Ammar bin Humaid Al Nuaimi.

== Geography ==
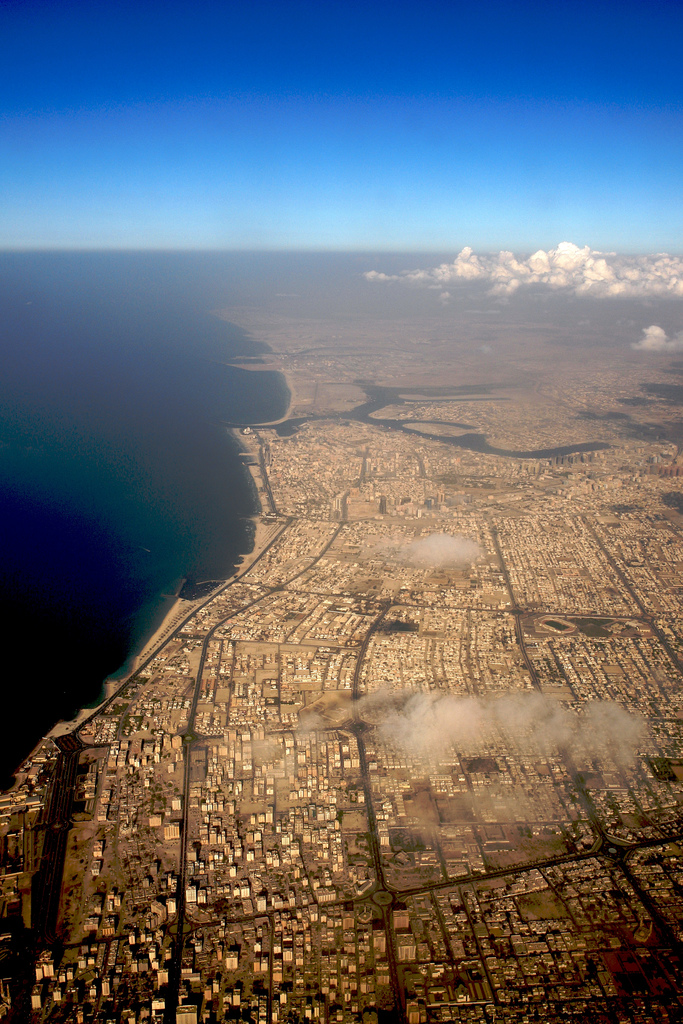
Ajman city (middle) and Sharjah city (below)

The Emirate of Ajman covers 260 square kilometres (100 sq mi). 95% of the population lives in the city of Ajman.

=== Manama and Masfout ===
As well as the city of Ajman, the emirate encompasses two landlocked exclaves, Manama and Masfout. Manama is located 73 kilometers to the capital's east, covering an area of 26 km^{2}. Manama is in the plains at the foothills of the Hajjar Mountains some 60 km east of Ajman city. It also consists of a little, primarily agricultural oasis containing quarries and mines of magnesium and chromium. Masfout is in the mountains proper, some 110 km southeast of Ajman City. It consists of a small town that provides essential services and valleys sustained by subsistence farming and marble quarrying.

The city and main territory of Ajman is bordered to the landward side by Sharjah, while Manama shares borders with Sharjah and Fujairah. Masfout borders Oman, Dubai (the village and exclave of Hatta) and Ras Al Khaimah. Both Manama and Masfout are fertile regions and support widespread agricultural development.

Most of the main emirate's landmass is developed, with extensive suburbs stretching out almost to the E311 arterial road, with light industrial zones and warehousing towards the northeast. Ajman's creek has been dredged and walled to form a port area and this is the location for the Ajman Port and the Ajman Free Zone. Ajman has a thriving textile industry and is home to some 15% of the UAE's manufacturing firms.

The small areas of sandy desert outside the city support scant seasonal growths of wild grasses and scrub, ghaf trees and occasional date palms. Acacia and ghaf trees are to be found in abundance in Manama, which has long been established as an agricultural centre. Date palm groves and fruit tree plantations are characteristic of Masfout.

== Administrative divisions and cities ==
The three municipalities in Ajman Emirate are:

- Ajman
- Manama
- Masfout (including Ajman-Oman condominium of Hadf)

=== Cities and suburbs ===
The list of cities for which data is available in the Ajman Metropolitan Area has been updated in the corresponding sources.

- Al Nuaimia
- Al Rawda
- Al Jerf
- Al Zahya
- Al Hamidiya
- Al Rumailah
- Al Nakhil
- Al Zorah
- Al Heliow
- Ajman Industrial areas

== Governance ==
The Emirate of Ajman is a monarchy, ruled by Sheikh Humaid bin Rashid Al Nuaimi III since succeeding his father in 1981. The Crown Prince of Ajman is Sheikh Ammar bin Humaid Al Nuaimi. The emirate has been ruled by members of the Al Nuaimi family (or tribe) since 1810. It contributes four senators, or seats, to the 40-seat Federal National Council of the United Arab Emirates.

Ajman's municipality and planning department was founded in 1968 and is responsible for integrated city planning, trade licensing, building licensing and planning and the development of roads and civic infrastructure, health care, agricultural policy and public parks. Sheikh Rashid bin Humaid Al Nuaimi is the Chairman of Ajman Municipality and Planning Department since 2005. In addition, Ajman has a Department of Economic Development, which encourages FDI and drives the emirate's economic opportunities.

Ajman's real estate market is regulated by the Ajman Real Estate Regulatory Authority (ARERA), established in December 2008 to bring regulation to bear on Ajman's fast-growing and uncontrolled property boom.

=== Rulers ===
Its rulers were:

- 1816–1838 Sheikh Rashid bin Humaid Al Nuaimi (died 1838)
- 1838–1841 Sheikh Humaid bin Rashid Al Nuaimi (1st time) (1816–1864)
- 1841–1848 Sheikh Abdelaziz bin Rashid Al Nuaimi (died 1848)
- 1848–1864 Sheikh Humaid bin Rashid Al Nuaimi (2nd time)
- 1864 – April 1891 Sheikh Rashid bin Humaid Al Nuaimi II (1841–1891)
- April 1891 – 8 July 1900 Sheikh Humaid bin Rashid Al Nuaimi II (died 1900)
- 8 July 1900 – February 1910 Sheikh Abdulaziz bin Humaid Al Nuaimi (18.. –1910)
- February 1910 – January 1928 Sheikh Humaid bin Abdulaziz Al Nuaimi
- January 1928 – 6 September 1981 Sheikh Rashid bin Humaid Al Nuaimi III (1904 –1981)
- 6 September 1981–present Sheikh Humaid bin Rashid Al Nuaimi III (born 1931)

=== Law enforcement ===
Ajman Police was founded in 1967 and originally housed in Ajman Fort, which was vacated by the Ruler, Sheikh Rashid Bin Humaid Al Nuaimi, in that year. Ajman's legal system is governed by UAE Federal law and the Federal courts.

== Demographics ==
Historical population
| Year | Pop. | ±% p.a. |
|---|---|---|
| 1980 | 36,100 | — |
| 1985 | 54,546 | +8.61% |
| 1995 | 121,491 | +8.34% |
| 2005 | 206,997 | +5.47% |
| 2010 | 295,000 | +7.34% |
| 2024 | 582,852 | +4.98% |
Source: Citypopulation

== Economy ==
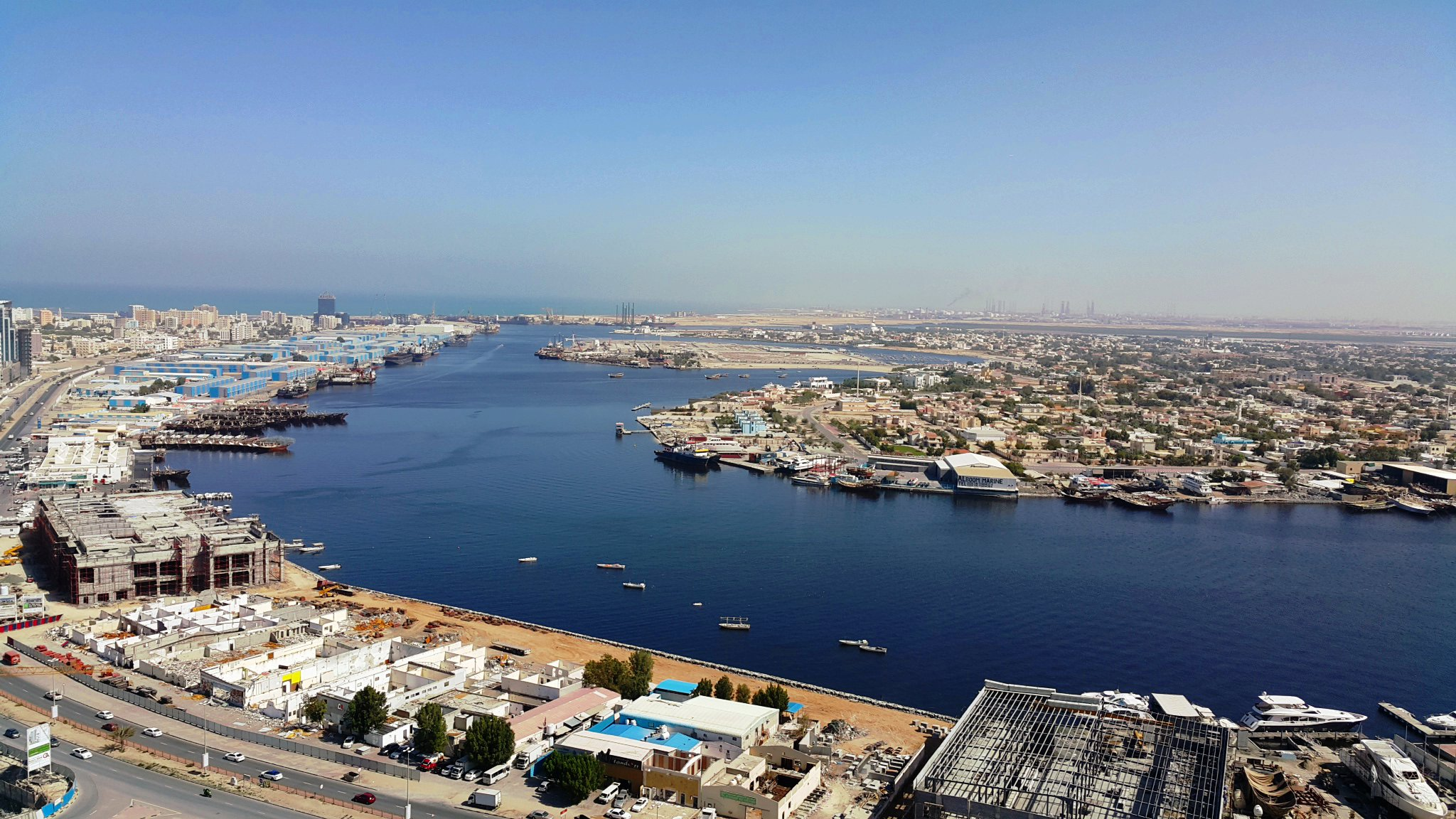
Al Rashidiya 1 district and port

Ajman's GDP was US$4.23 billion in 2012, in which it had a positive trade balance with exports of US$1.61 billion and imports of US$600 million. Ajman grew by 5% as GDP increased from DH 15,690 million in 2012 to DH 16,441 million in 2013, according to the annual economic reports of Ajman 2013 and 2014.

Ajman's economy is dominated by five sectors: manufacturing; construction; wholesale and retail; real estate and business services; and transport, storage and communications. In 2012, these sectors contributed some 82% of total GDP, with manufacturing (37%) and construction (15%) the two largest contributors. The three largest growth sectors in Ajman from 2010 to 2012 were social and personal services, which grew 6.4%, transport, storage and communication, which grew 5.1% and manufacturing, which grew 5%.

In 2013, the relative share of manufacturing activity formed 35% of GDP. The construction sector constituted 15%, including general contracting and maintenance, construction, and civil construction such as roads, bridges, and water systems. The relative contribution of the wholesale, retail trade, and repair services sector, which includes the resale of new and used goods, repair, and maintenance, reached about 13% of the value of GDP in the same year.

The fastest-growing trades in the manufacturing sector from 2009 to 2011 were carpentry and paper products, printing and publishing. Overall, the manufacturing sector in Ajman grew 16.3% over this period. The re-exporting of chemicals and plastic products clocked over 100% growth in this same time period.

Major export markets from 2009 to 2011 were represented by the GCC countries (31%) and Asia (27%), while Africa and Asia were the fastest growing export markets over this period. Saudi Arabia, Qatar, Oman and Iran were the Ajman's principal export trade partners.

Investments in Ajman grew in 2013 by 5% compared to 2012. Exports (including re-export) grew in the second quarter of 2014 by 53%.

In 2023, Ajman's GDP was AED 36 billion (US$ 9.8 billion) showing a significant growth of 6.25% compared to 2022.

=== Free Zones ===
Ajman has several Free Zones.

- Ajman Free Zone (AFZ)
- Ajman Media City (AMC)
- Ajman NuVentures Centre Free Zone (ANCFZ)

=== Ajman Free Zone (AFZ) ===
Established in 1988 to lead the industrial development of the emirate by attracting various companies and offering different privileges. Ajman Port and Ajman Free Zone are major contributors to the emirate's economy. Exporting to over 65 countries, the Free Zone has some 256 industrial companies and more than 12,000 companies operated in it.

The business activity in Ajman Free Zone grew at an annual growth rate of about 23%, while the licenses issued grew from 1590 in 2009 to 2386 in 2011. The number of issued licenses by Ajman Municipality increased from 17,873 in 2009 to 21,799 in 2011 at an annual average rate of 10.4%. Then, it jumped to 24,525 in 2013 to mark the average growth rate as 26% in 2013. The renewed licenses in Ajman Free Zone increased by 33% in 2014 compared to 2013, while the new licenses issued in the same period achieved an increase of 70%.

=== Real estate ===
Ajman was the first emirate in the UAE to offer 100% freehold to global investors, in 2004. This led to real estate prices rising rapidly, from $11 per square foot and, by 2007, developers had announced projects worth $21.78 billion, consisting of around 65,000 units in all. In an emirate with a population that used to be 240,000 the figure was high by any standard and the pace of development was not sustainable, with the 2008 financial crisis bringing development to a sharp halt. With considerable pain from investors in stalled projects, the Ajman Real Estate Regulatory Agency came under considerable pressure.

By 2011, work was continued on a number of projects, including the mixed business, leisure and residential development Ajman One.

In 2025, Tiger Properties announced a $10 billion project called Tiger Downtown Ajman.

=== Recent developments ===
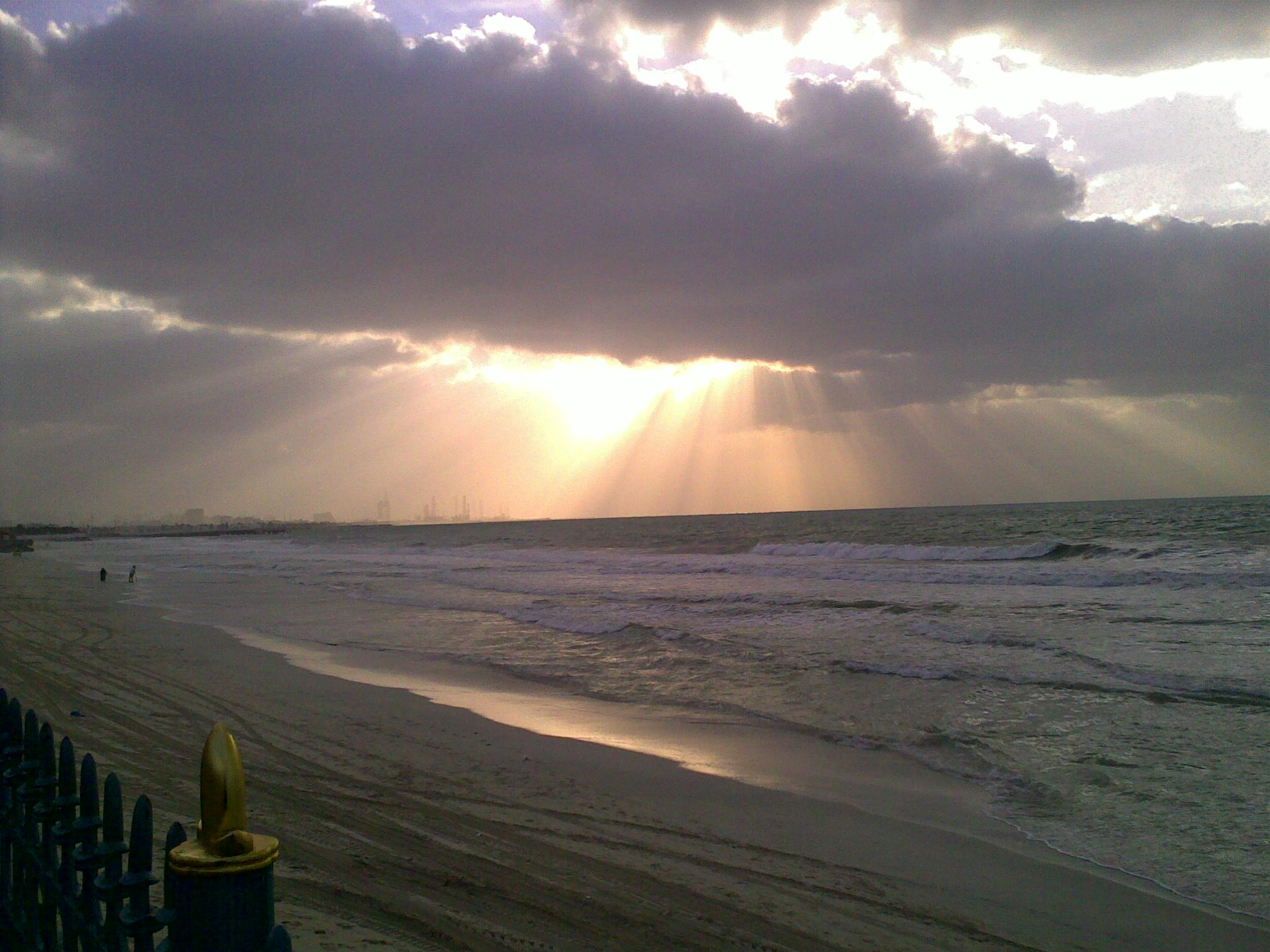
Beach at Ajman

A development boom followed the opening of Ajman's real estate market to global investors in 2004, with 'true' freehold on offer. By 2008 the growth of real estate speculation and investment had led to the establishment of a real estate regulator, the Ajman Real Estate Regulatory Agency. Arguably ineffective in the face of the fast-moving and evolutionary gold rush taking place, ARERA had not implemented widespread policies or regulations to curb the overheating market by the time the 2008 financial crisis brought many developments to a crashing halt. As of 2014, a number of key stalled projects had restarted, marking a more cautious and measured return to the development of the emirate's real estate market, which has recently benefited from offering competitive rentals to nearby Sharjah and Dubai.

The construction of Ajman International Airport began in the second half of 2008 after rescheduling the plan in 2003 in the Al Manama area of Ajman. Airport operations were scheduled to begin by 2011, and the airport was expected to host about 1 million passengers a year, rising to 10.4 million by 2046. The project stalled but has now been restarted and was projected to be completed by 2018 and will entail an investment of some $575m. However, it was put on hold till early 2020.

In 2007, the Ajman Marina project was launched by the Tanmiyat Group. The $3 billion was being constructed in two phases over the following five years. The project includes running tracks and facilities to attract international sporting events and provide a draw for tourism to the emirate.

In 2016, Aqaar was established under Amiri Decree No. (9). The company is a joint venture between the Private Properties Administration and the Public Real Estate Investment Company, the company plays an effective role in the development of the real estate sector in the Emirate of Ajman.

== Places of interest ==
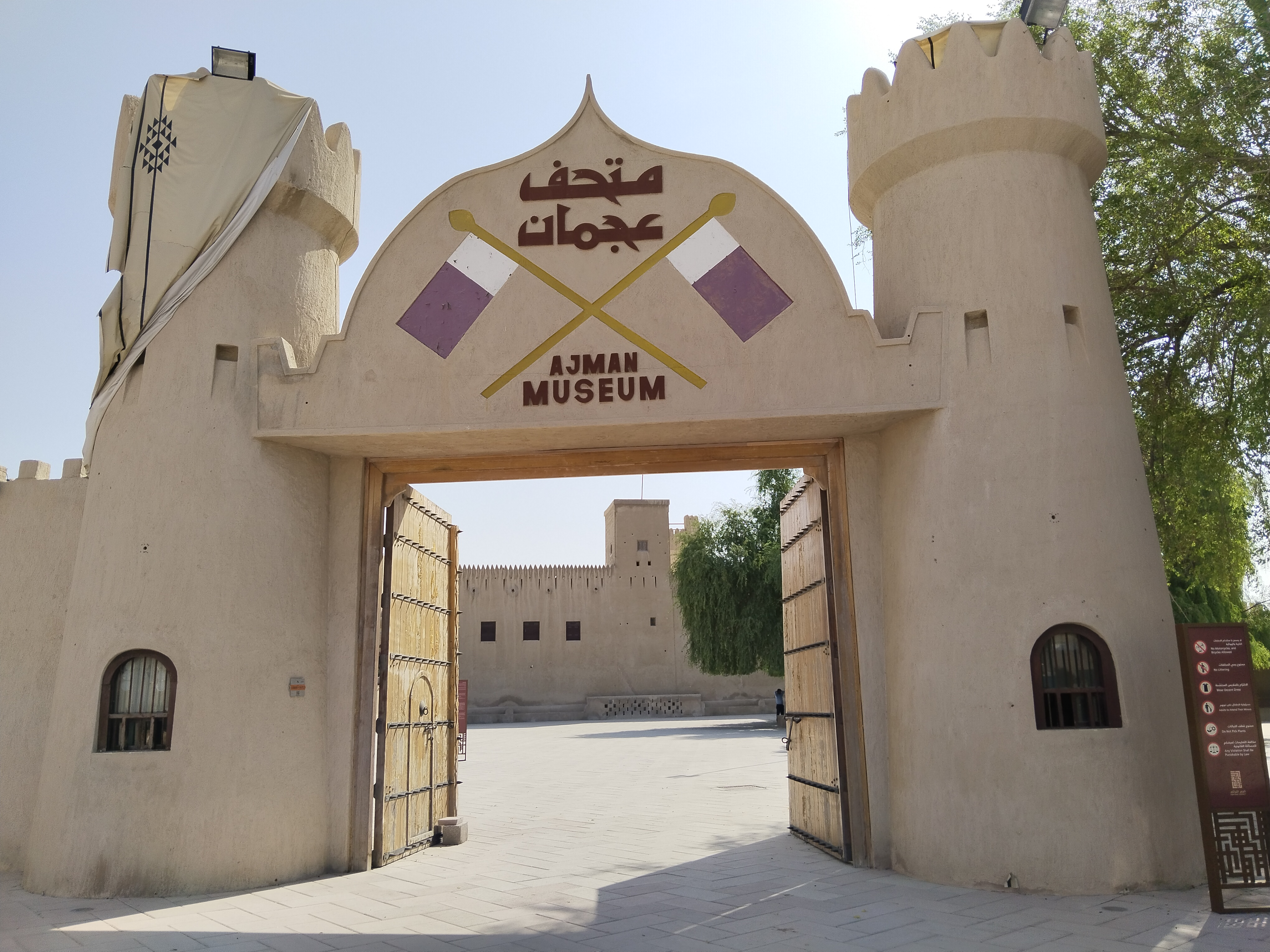
Main Entrance of Ajman Museum

Ajman Fort was formerly the residence of the Ruler of Ajman but turned over to Ajman Police as their barracks in 1967. It was subsequently converted into a museum and housed an eclectic collection of artifacts and exhibitions of traditional life in Ajman.

The Red Fort was built during Sheikh Humaid bin Abdul Aziz Al Nuaimi (1910–1928), and consists of four rooms in two towers. The fort was restored in 1986 and a third tower was added to the two older towers. Gravel and red plaster were used in the construction of the walls of the fort and hence it was named the Red Fort. Sandalwood was used in the beams and supports for the construction of the roofs.

Manama museum, opened on 2 December 2012, is located in Al Mareer Fort, which was originally built during the reign of Sheikh Rashid bin Humaid Al Nuaimi (1873 – 1891). A yard overlooks seven rooms and a well. The fort is surrounded by palm trees irrigated by the old Manama Falaj.

Located on the Ajman Corniche, the square Al Murabaa Watchtower was built in the 1930s.

Ajman's busy corniche is a popular evening and weekend destination for families and features a number of fast food outlets, coffee shops and stalls, hotels and other establishments.

== Education ==
Ajman University was founded in 1988 as Ajman University College of Science and Technology (AUCST) and subsequently was renamed Ajman University of Science and Technology (AUST). It is the principal higher education institution in Ajman, with colleges offering specializations in engineering, information technology, dentistry, mass communication, pharmacy and health sciences, business administration, environment, water and energy, education and law. Consisting of two clusters, J1 (25 lecture halls and 23 laboratories) and J2 (56 lecture halls and 56 laboratories), the university includes a teaching hospital for both dental and medical specializations. Ajman University was ranked #5 in the UAE, #12 in the Arab world and #397 among the top 400 universities in the world.

The Gulf Medical University (GMU), previously Gulf Medical College, was established in 1998 as a leading medical university in the Gulf region and was awarded university status in July 2008 after an order issued by Sheikh Nahyan Bin Mubarak Al Nahyan, Minister of Higher Education and Scientific Research. Its Hospital Group is the largest healthcare provider in the UAE. The Gulf Medical University offers both Undergraduate and Graduate Programs.

City University College of Ajman (CUCA) is an institution of higher education located in Ajman. CUCA received its license from the UAE Ministry of Higher Education and Scientific Research (MOHESR) in August 2011. It provides education for UAE nationals and international students.

== Transportation ==
Ajman has multiple transportation options, including taxis, special-need taxis, ladies taxis, and buses, with fares starting at 3 AED. In 2010, the APTA chairman said there were 1,600 taxis operated by four companies in Ajman.

== Sports ==
Cricket and football are popular games and sports in Ajman. Ajman Club is an Emirati football club based in Ajman.
