= Ajman Fort =

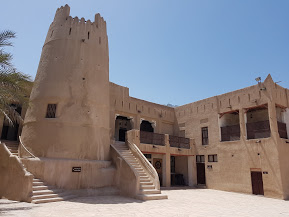
- Ajman Fort

- Location within United Arab Emirates
- 25°41′35″N 55°44′56″E
- Type: Fortification
- Periods: 17th century – current
- Location: Ajman
- Region: United Arab Emirates

History
- Built: 18th century
- Abandoned: 1967

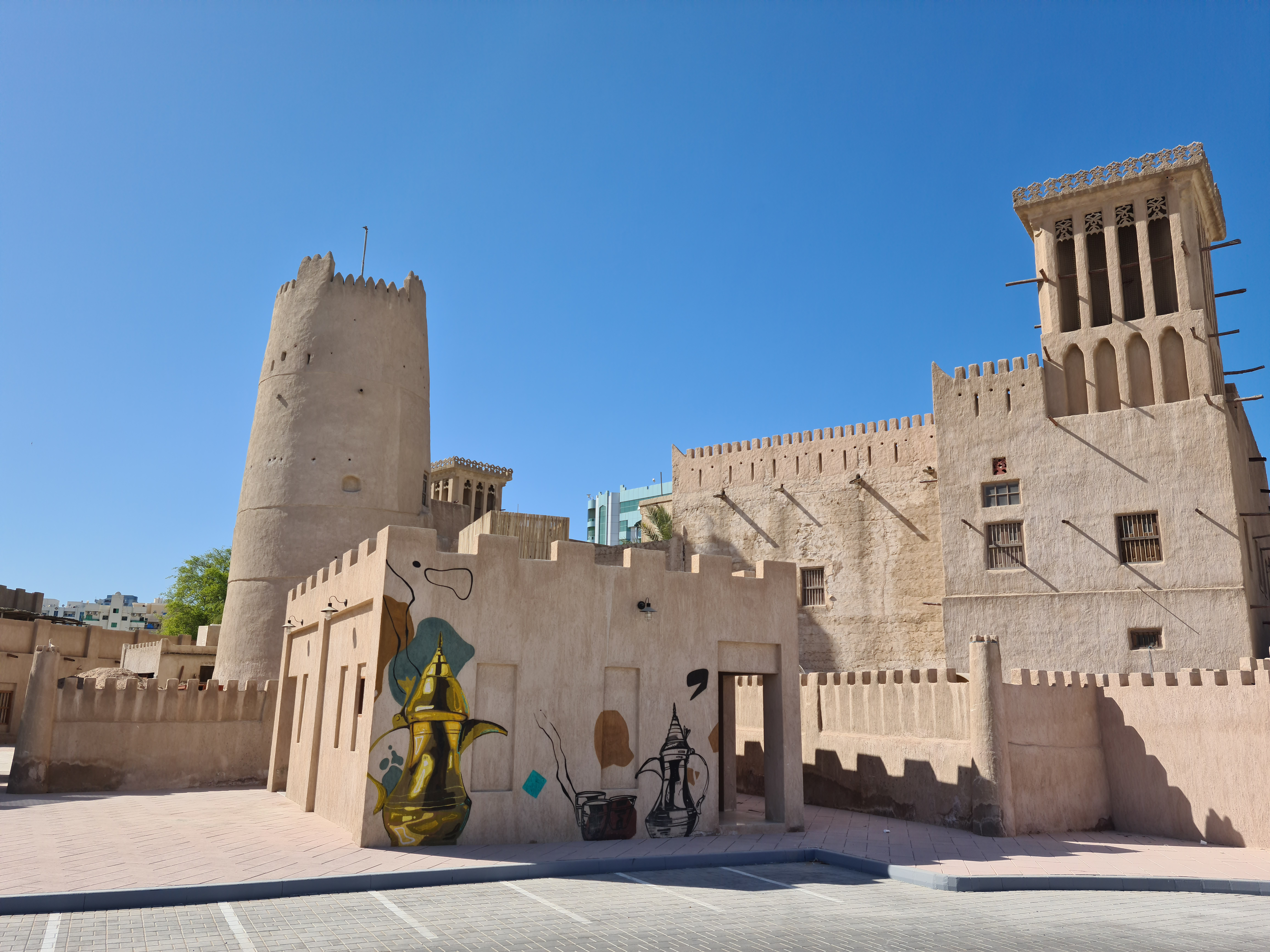
Ajman Fort showing the watchtower and barjeel, claimed to be the oldest in the Emirates.

Ajman Fort is a double-storey traditional rock, coral and mudbrick fortification in the centre of the city of Ajman in the United Arab Emirates (UAE). Its construction is thought to date back to the late 18th century and it is claimed the fort's barjeel, or wind tower, is the oldest such structure in the UAE.

== Establishment ==
Ajman Fort has been central to the history of the city and emirate of Ajman and its rulers for over 200 years. The establishment of Ajman as an independent emirate under Al Nuaimi rule took place when Sheikh Rashid bin Humaid Al Nuaimi and fifty followers took effective control of the coastal settlement of Ajman in a short conflict. The consolidation of that establishment did not take place until 1816 or 1817, when Ajman Fort finally fell to Rashid and his followers. Rashid was duly recognised as the Ruler of Ajman by the Ruler of Sharjah, Sheikh Saqr bin Sultan Al Qasimi, who had previously claimed Ajman under his sphere of influence or suzerainty.

Having fallen to an invasion from Al Heera in 1820, in 1821, Ajman Fort again fell briefly to a force of Darawisha Bedouin, who were removed by the action of Saqr bin Sultan of Sharjah.

Rashid bin Humaid's rule saw the bombardment of Ajman and its fort from the sea by British forces in the course of the 1819 punitive expedition mounted by the British against the Qawasim. This led to Rashid bin Humaid becoming a signatory to the General Maritime Treaty of 1820. The fort was completely destroyed in the action.

The peaceful accession of Rashid's son, Humaid bin Rashid Al Nuaimi, as Ruler of Ajman in 1838 was not to last long however, and in 1841 Humaid's brother Abdelaziz bin Rashid Al Nuaimi took possession of Ajman fort and declared himself Ruler. In this he made a powerful enemy, as Humaid had married a daughter of Sultan bin Saqr Al Qasimi, who now sought his restoration. In 1848, Abdelaziz bin Rashid was killed during an armed conflict with Ajman's secessionist neighbouring town of Hamriyah. On Abdelaziz' death, Humaid, who was also wounded in the conflict, became Ruler once again.

== The fort in conflict ==
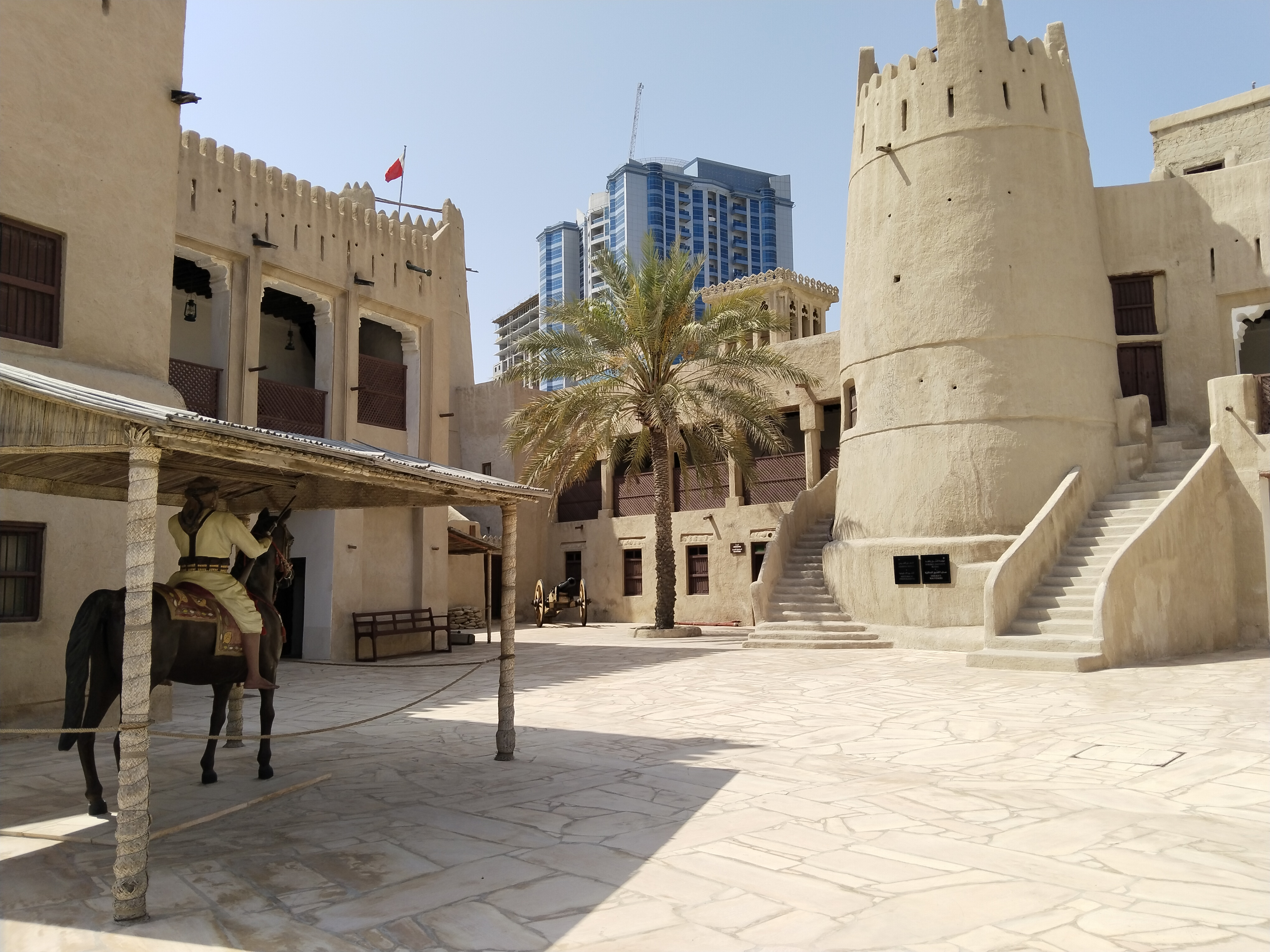
Main Ground of Ajman Fort

On 15 June 1920, Abdulrahman bin Muhammad Al Shamsi, the headman of another secessionist neighbour of Ajman's, Al Heera, seized Ajman Fort and declared himself ruler in place of the-then Ruler of Ajman, Humaid bin Abdulaziz Al Nuaimi. He was only removed after the intercession of the British Residency Agent, Khan Bahadur Isa bin Abdullatif Al Serkal, the British Residency Agent acting in concert with Khalid bin Ahmed Al Qasimi of Sharjah. Khalid subsequently raised a force together with Humaid bin Abdulaziz and they attacked Abdulrahman in Al Heera. Again, the British intervened and an agreement was made that recognised Abdulrahman as a subject of Khalid's and bound him to cause no further trouble.

Irritated by constant British mediation over the Al Heera affair, Humaid bin Abdulaziz defied the British in the matter of a manumission certificate which he had allegedly torn up. Refusing to come on board a British ship to meet with the British Resident and also refusing to pay a 1,000 Rupee fine levied on him, he was finally threatened with bombardment, HMS Crocus and HMS Cyclamen both being offshore at the time. Humaid threatened the British that it would "be the worse for them" if they dared to bombard his fort and they commenced fire. The subsequent bombardment once again reduced the fort and, with one of its great towers totally demolished and a second crumbling under withering cannon fire, Humaid sued for peace and paid the fine.

== Police station to museum ==
In 1967, Rashid bin Ḥumaid Al Nuaimi – who had ruled Ajman from Ajman Fort since 1928 – moved out of the fort and the building was given over to become the headquarters of Ajman Police. It was occupied by the police until 1978. The fort was then abandoned before being restored in the early 1980s. It is now home to Ajman Museum and forms the centrepiece of the Dhs 25 million Ajman Heritage District, a tourist attraction featuring restored buildings and walkways with some 37 shops, opened in October 2020.

== See also ==
- List of cultural property of national significance in the United Arab Emirates
