= Rera =

RERA may refer to:

- Dubai Real Estate Regulatory Agency
- Ajman Real Estate Regulatory Agency
- Real Estate (Regulation and Development) Act, 2016, the regulatory law passed by the Parliament of India
- Respiratory-effort related arousal, see Respiratory disturbance index
- Rera, a fictional character, the alter ego of Nakoruru
- Rera, two-part folk singing characteristic of Sinj, Croatia
- A discontinued photographic film

== See also ==
- RER A
