= Grand Mall Ajman =

- Location: Ajman, United Arab Emirates
- Coordinates: 25.3926°N 55.4389°E
- Opened: 5 January 2020; 6 years ago
- Owner: Ajman's Municipality and Planning Department
- Num. of stores: 90

The Grand Mall Ajman (Arabic: جراند مول عجمان) is a shopping mall and apartment complex in the emirate of Ajman, United Arab Emirates (UAE), which is owned and operated by the Government of the Ajman Emirate.

== Location ==
It is located on Sheikh Khalifa Bin Zayed St in Ajman.

== Shopping, entertainment, and living ==
The Grand Mall Ajman consists of 409 apartments, 163 commercial offices and 90 shops, as well as restaurants, a hospital and a movie theatre. It was opened in 2019, and in March 2019 received visit from local Emirate President and Emirati Supreme Council leader Humaid bin Rashid Al Nuaimi III. The mall has Star Cinemas Now, Madeena Medical Centre, Aqaar main offices, a kids playing area, and a fitness club. There also are green lights located on the street around the mall that have the former ruler Sheikh Zayed's image inside them.

== Use as a COVID and medical testing center for the government ==
In 2019, the Emirati Government set up a temporary testing center in multiple malls and store outlets throughout the Emirates with the Grand Mall being used as the primary location for citizens in Ajman. The Prime Medical Clinic was the sponsor.

In 2020 and 2021, additional testing for governmental events and COVID testing occurred there through the same Prime Medical Clinic.
