= EJARI =

Dubai online registration system for realty contracts

In Dubai, EJARI is an online registration system initiated by the Real Estate Regulatory Agency (RERA) that requires all rental or lease contracts in Dubai to be recorded at this portal. The main objective of the system is to legalize the relationship between landlords and tenants in Dubai.

RERA made it mandatory from 14 March 2010 for landlords to enter the basic details of their rental properties, including terms of tenancy agreement and property details, into EJARI. Each entry is assigned a unique barcode by the system for future reference. EJARI was introduced to address malpractice in the rental sector by making the renting procedure transparent for all parties. Tenancy contracts not registered with EJARI are not protected by any of the regulatory authorities in Dubai.

As of 2013, an EJARI registered tenancy contract must be submitted with all applications for residency visas in Dubai. As of June 2013, such a contract must also be presented to connect with home services of the Emirates Integrated Telecommunications Company (Du), including Internet and TV.

The responsibility to registering a tenancy contract with EJARI lies with both the landlord and tenant, or if a property management company is involved, with that company's agent. However, it is more common for tenants to register their contract and pay the associated fees themselves.

== Criticism ==
EJARI and the Dubai Electricity and Water Authority (DEWA) have received criticism for their lack of cooperation. To register with EJARI, a receipt for the payment of the DEWA security deposit must be provided. However, the receipt provided for online payment of the DEWA security deposit is not accepted by EJARI. This often results in long delays, and causes problems for tenants wishing to subscribe to services.
