= Al Zorah =

Coastal suburb in Ajman, UAE

Al Zorah الزورا
- Residential area Cultural area
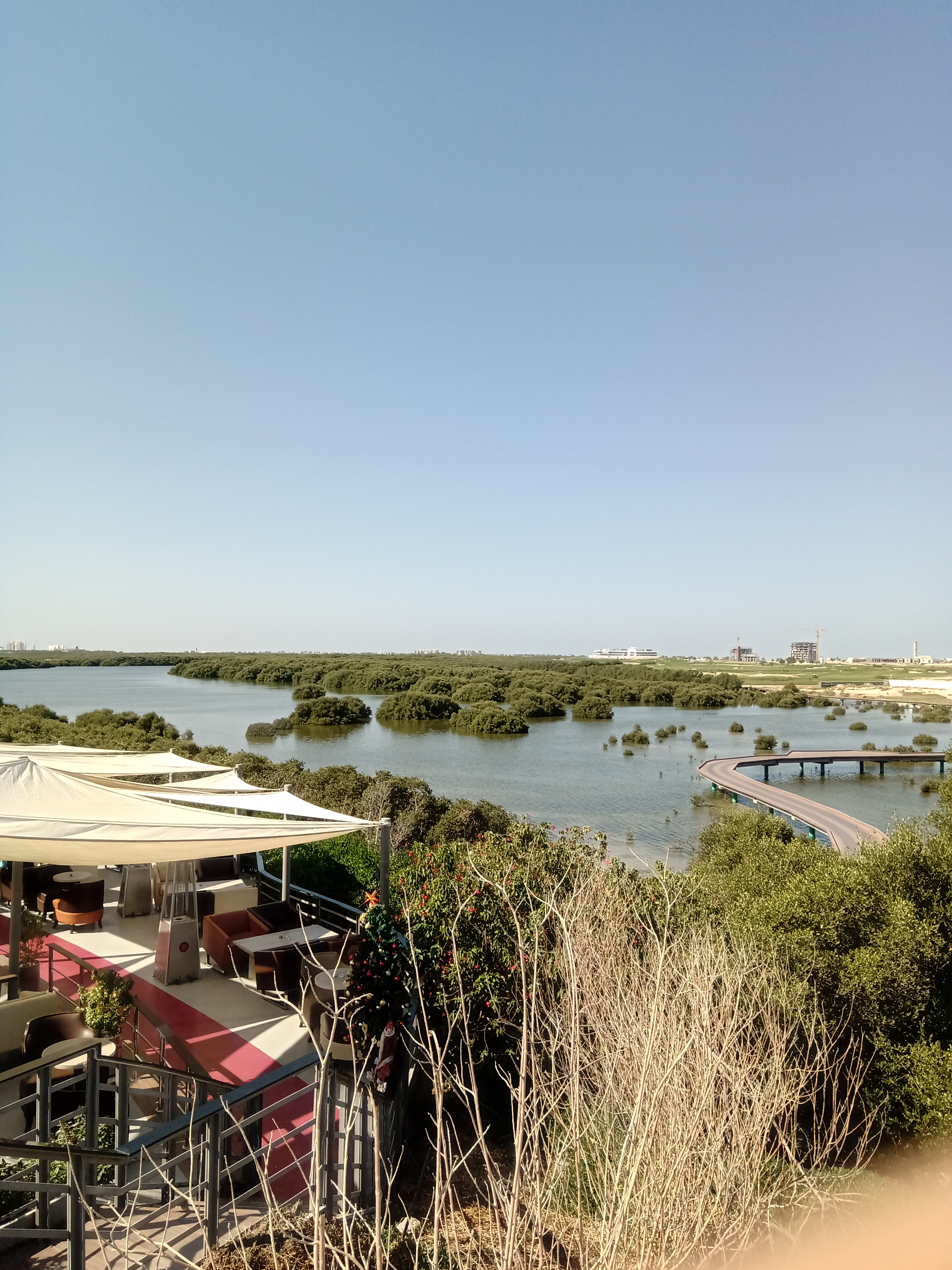
- Mangroves of Al Zorah, Ajman

- Location within United Arab Emirates
- Coordinates: 25°26′10″N 55°29′18″E
- Country: United Arab Emirates
- Emirate: Emirate of Ajman
- City: Ajman
- Established: 2000

Area
  - Total: 1.36 km^{2} (0.53 sq mi)

Population (expected)
  - Total: 40,000
  - Density: 29,000/km^{2} (76,000/sq mi)

Al Zorah (Arabic: الزورا) is a coastal suburb of Ajman, United Arab Emirates (UAE), situated on the northern border of Ajman and Sharjah, between Ajman and Hamriyah. It is the location of the Al Zorah mixed use luxury development, which comprises housing and leisure developments, including the Al Zorah Golf Club, the Al Zorah Beach Resort (formerly the Oberoi Beach Resort, Al Zorah), and the Lux Al Zorah (slated to open 2021). It is also the site of Al Zorah Nature reserve, which is home to some 60 species of bird including pink flamingo, egret and heron.

== History ==
Originally an uninhabited sandy island surrounded by mangrove swamps, Al Zorah was disputed when, in 1865, Sheikh Khalid bin Sultan Al Qasimi of Sharjah, supported by Sheikh Rashid bin Humaid Al Nuaimi of Ajman and with the financial assistance of the Wahhabi agent, Turki bin Ahmed Al Sudairi, erected a fort there. As the development 'threatened the peace of the coast' according to the British, it was bombarded by the British ship HMS Highflyer.

In 1895, Sheikh Zayed bin Khalifa Al Nahyan saw in Al Zorah an ideal base for supplying Bani Qitab forces loyal to him in conflicts with the Northern Ghafiri Sheikhs and applied to the British Resident for permission to move supplies there by sea. Unaware of the true reasons for the movement, the Resident gave permission but Zayed faced opposition in his scheme from other Sheikhs and was unable to complete the movement. In 1897, a section of the Sudan (singular Al Suwaidi) tribe under Sultan bin Nasser Al Suwaidi requested permission to settle Al Zorah with the support of Zayed (himself a Suwaidi on his mother's side and married to one of Sultan's daughters) and this was granted by the British Resident.

Alarmed by the scheme, the ruler of Ajman, Sheikh Abdulaziz bin Humaid Al Nuaimi, in 1890 built a fort at one of the waterways connecting Al Zorah with the mainland (it was at the time an island) and simultaneously the Ruler of Sharjah Sheikh Saqr bin Khalid Al Qasimi appealed to the Resident to prevent this establishment of a Hinawi stronghold in the midst of his territory. This appeal being upheld, to the annoyance of Zayed who had seen Al Zorah as an extension of his claim to the Northern coast, the scheme was abandoned and the decision to block it was subsequently upheld after a visit to Al Zorah by Major Percy Cox, the British Political Resident. Zayed gave up on his schemes for a northern expansion of his influence and focused again on consolidating his southern tribal federation.

Following the Hyacinth Incident in 1910, British Political Resident in the Persian Gulf Percy Cox proposed Al Zorah as a suitable site for a wireless telegraphy station, but his plans were neither approved or implemented.

== Development ==
The Al Zorah planned development project has been implemented by the Al Zorah Development Company P.S.C, a partnership between the Government of Ajman and Lebanese developer Solidere International. Under Ajman law, Al Zorah is a designated free zone, which allows for 100% foreign ownership of property and businesses and confers tax free status.

The 5.4 million square metre development (of which 1 million square metres are mangroves, forming the Al Zorah Nature Reserve) includes five distinct housing districts: the Shores, the Fairways, the Coves, the Gates and the Avenues. Overall, 60% of the project's land area is given over to mangroves and public spaces. The Avenues comprises 2 km of retail and leisure developments. The development includes a watersports centre and tours by both boat and seaplane. The Marina-1 development offers berths for yachts between eight and 40 metres alongside 15 restaurants and cafés.

The 18-hole championship golf course at Al Zorah was designed by Jack Nicklaus and is managed by Troon Golf.
