= Simsari =

- Company type: Real Estate Regulatory Portal
- Industry: Real estate
- Founded: 2006
- Headquarters: Dubai, United Arab Emirates
- Website: www.simsari.ae

Simsari is a web based product designed and developed for the real estate industry of the United Arab Emirates (UAE). It is approved by the State Government of the Emirate of Dubai and the Dubai Land Department. It was previously launched in 2006 as the only government-supported online real estate portal by two privately owned corporate innovators Tamweel and Tejari. Later Dubai Land Department nationalized this private brand and Simsari was taken over by Real Estate Regulatory Agency (RERA) supported by Dubai Land Department. The primary aim of launching this online registration system is to develop genuine and trusted Multiple Listing Portal in order to regulate real estate brokers allowing them to create contractual offers.

== Simsari launch ==
Simsari re-launched in 2012, after it was taken over by RERA. RERA has ordered and approved property owners and property brokerage firms to register all of their assets available for sale on Simsari.ae. The deadline for property registration with the online portal was 31 August 2012. Dubai Land Department and RERA considered it as a mandatory requirement from 1 September 2012. All RERA-approved real estate brokers and property management firms who do not get their properties registered before this deadline will be penalized.

== Advantages ==
A major benefit of registering properties with this Simsari is that it will limit the number of ghost listings in Dubai. It is a common practice of real estate property sellers to list a single property with several brokerage firms with different prices; after registering with Simsari, every real estate agency or agent can is limited to listing each property with three property management firms.

Samsari provides detailed information about listed properties with financial approval. In contrast, for sellers, Simsari provides complete property marketing services and partnership with other agents. After the re-launching of Simsari under the regulation of RERA, it successfully ended fake property listings and brokers.
