= HMS Cyclamen (1916) =

History

United Kingdom
- Name: HMS Cyclamen
- Launched: 22 February 1916
- Decommissioned: 2 July 1932
- Fate: Sold for scrap

General characteristics
- Class & type: Arabis-class sloop

HMS Cyclamen was an Arabis-class sloop of the Royal Navy. She was launched in 1916 and served during World War I and the interwar period before being sold for scrap in 1932.

== Design and construction ==
The Arabis class was a slightly enlarged and improved derivative of the previous Acacia-class and Azalea-class sloops. (Note: Together with the following Aubrietia class and Anchusa class, these classes were collectively known as Flower-class sloops.) They were designed at the start of the First World War as relatively fast minesweepers that could also carry out various miscellaneous duties in support of the fleet such as acting as dispatch vessels or carrying out towing operations, but as the war continued and the threat from German submarines grew, became increasingly involved in anti-submarine duties.

Cyclamen was 268 ft (81.69 m) long overall and 255 ft (77.72 m) between perpendiculars, with a beam of 33 ft 6 in (10.21 m) and a draught of 11 ft (3.35 m). Displacement was 1,200 long tons (1,200 t) normal. Two cylindrical boilers fed steam to a four-cylinder triple expansion steam engine rated at 2,000 ihp (1,500 kW), giving a speed of 16 knots (30 km/h; 18 mph). The Arabis class had a main armament of two 4.7-inch (120 mm) guns or two 4-inch (102 mm) guns, with two 3-pounder (47 mm) anti-aircraft guns also carried.

Cyclamen was one of a batch of 21 Arabis-class sloops ordered by the British Admiralty on 15 July 1915, following on from 9 ordered on 6 July, and with a further 6 ordered on 27 July. She was laid down as yard number 808 at Lobnitz and Company's Renfrew shipyard was launched on 22 February 1916 and completed on 11 April 1916. She was the first ship of that name to serve with the Royal Navy.

== Service history ==
On commissioning, Cyclamen joined the Mediterranean Fleet, based at Malta. During World War I, Cyclamen was primarily engaged in minesweeping operations. On 10 March 1917, Cyclamen misidentified the Italian submarine Guglielmotti as an enemy vessel, and sank the submarine by ramming and gunfire. On 9 January 1918, Cyclamen was escorting a convoy off Bizerta when she sighted a periscope of a submarine. The sloop deployed explosive anti-submarine sweeps, one of which detonated, briefly forcing the German submarine UB-69 to the surface, before the submarine sank, with Cyclamen dropping a depth charge to ensure the submarine was destroyed. Cyclamen was later awarded a prize of £200 for the sinking of UB-69. By June 1918, Cyclamen was listed as part of the British Adriatic Force. Cyclamen remained in the Adriatic at the end of the war, as part of the 10th Sloop Flotilla.

Cyclamen was one of two remaining ships in the 10th Sloop Flotilla in March 1919, but in April was listed as paid off in Malta.

After the war, Cyclamen patrolled the Persian Gulf and, in May 1921 took part in the punitive bombardment of Ajman Fort together with HMS Crocus, completely destroying one tower and partially destroying a second before the ruler of Ajman sued for peace. The ruler had torn up a slave's manumission certificate in a gesture of defiance against British authority. She continued to serve in the interwar period, including patrol duties enforcing British political and economic policy in the Gulf region.

== Decommissioning and fate ==
After over a decade of service, HMS Cyclamen was sold for scrap on 2 July 1932, ending her service in the Royal Navy.
