= Ajman Heritage District =

Heritage District in Ajman

Coordinates: 25.4134°N 55.4454°E

The Ajman Heritage District is a cultural and tourism destination in the United Arab Emirates (UAE). It is located in the Emirate of Ajman. The district is known for its blend of antiquities, ancient trees, and historical landmarks, providing visitors with a cultural and recreational experience.

== Key attractions ==
Included within the district are the Ajman Museum, which offers insights into the region's history and heritage, and the Old Saleh Souk, a traditional market that showcases the region's commercial history. Visitors can explore the district's preserved antiquities and ancient trees, which serve as a testament to the area's long-standing cultural significance.
