= Abdulaziz bin Humaid Al Nuaimi =

- Sheikh

Ruler of Ajman
- Reign: 1900–1910
- Predecessor: Humaid bin Rashid Al Nuaimi II
- Successor: Humaid bin Abdulaziz Al Nuaimi
- Died: 1910
- House: Al Nuaimi

Abdulaziz bin Humaid Al Nuaimi was Ruler of Ajman, one of the Trucial States, which today form the United Arab Emirates (UAE), from 1900 to 1910. He steered Ajman through a period in which tribal conflicts triggered instability throughout the coast but was to ultimately meet the fate he had himself engineered for his predecessor.

== Coup ==
The then-ruler of Ajman, Humaid bin Rashid Al Nuaimi II, was deeply unpopular within the ruling family as he had failed to pay a number of subsidies and allowances to family members. On the morning of 8 July 1900, he was killed by his uncle, Abdulaziz bin Humaid Al Nuaimi, who led the coup against him and who subsequently became the Ruler of Ajman. Abdulaziz wrote to the British Resident at Bushehr, confirming his accession and his agreement to abide by all of the treaties between his predecessors and the British. He also moved to ensure that British subjects resident in Ajman were assured of their safety and that of their interests.

A close friend of Saqr bin Khalid Al Qasimi, Sheikh Abdulaziz travelled to Sharjah to attend Curzon's Viceregal Darbar of Curzon on 21 November 1903.

Abdulaziz was present at the first formal meeting of the Sheikhs of the Trucial Coast, in April 1905. The meeting was attended by Sheikh Zayed of Abu Dhabi; Sheikh Saqr bin Khalid Al Qassimi of Sharjah; Sheikh Rashid bin Ahmad Al Mualla of Umm Al Quwain. The meeting was called as the result of a dispute which had arisen between Masfout and Hajarain (today known as Hatta) in the Wadi Hatta, in which the Bani Qitab tribe had built a fort in the wadi and were stopping caravans passing to and from Oman. Masfout at the time was linked to the Na'im of Buraimi, another branch of Ajman's ruling family. Following this meeting, Sheikh Rashid bin Ahmad Al Mualla also arranged a reconciliation between the Sheikhs of the Bani Qitab and Abdulaziz bin Humaid.

Abdulaziz also entered into a further treaty with the British in 1902, abolishing the arms trade.

== Al Zorah ==
The area of Al Zorah came to the fore in 1895, when the Sheikh of Abu Dhabi, Zayed bin Khalifa Al Nahyan made moves to establish a northern beach-head there. Although this plan was ultimately frustrated by the Rulers of the northern emirates, Abdulaziz inherited the problem when a section of the Sudan (singular: Al Suwaidi) tribe requested permission from the British Resident to settle Al Zorah and were granted this in 1897, with the support of Zayed. Sheikh Zayed was a Suwaidi on his mother's side and a daughter of the Sudan Sheikh, Sultan bin Nasir, was married to Zayed.

Abdulaziz moved immediately to build a fort blockading the landward access to Al Zorah and, simultaneously, Sheikh Saqr bin Khalid Al Qasimi, the Ruler of Sharjah, petitioned the British against the establishment of an alien community in the middle of Al Qasimi territory. The permission was consequently revoked and, visiting the area of Al Zorah in 1905, Percy Cox came to the conclusion that no such settlement should take place without the unanimous consent of the Trucial Sheikhs.

== Coup ==
A plot was hatched in 1910 by a nephew of Sheikh Abdulaziz', Mohammed bin Rashid Al Nuaimi, who encouraged a slave by the name of Yaqoot to attack and kill Abdulaziz. This triggered a general outrage and a mob formed, killing Yaqoot and forcing Mohammed bin Rashid to flee for his life into the desert. Humaid bin Abdulaziz Al Nuaimi, Abdulaziz' son, was travelling in Muscat at the time and had to rush home to consolidate his position as the next Ruler of Ajman.
