= Ajman Police Force =

Local law enforcement agency in the Emirate of Ajman

Ajman Police شرطة عجمان

Agency overview
- Formed: 1967; 59 years ago
- Employees: 2000+
- Legal personality: Police Force

Jurisdictional structure
- Operations jurisdiction: Emirate of Ajman, United Arab Emirates
- Map of Ajman Police's jurisdiction
- Area: 259 km^{2} (100 sq mi)
- Population: 582,852
- Legal jurisdiction: Emirate of Ajman
- Governing body: Government of Ajman
- General nature: Local civilian police

Operational structure
- Headquarters: Ajman, United Arab Emirates
- Agency executive: Major General Sheikh Sultan bin Abdullah Al Nuaimi, Commander in Chief

Website
- ajmanpolice.gov.ae

Ajman Police (Arabic: شرطة عجمان) is the local law enforcement agency in the Emirate of Ajman, United Arab Emirates.

== History ==
Ajman Police was established in 1967 by the late Sheikh Rashid Bin Humaid Al Nuaimi. Originally, it was operating out of the Ajman Fort, and had 7 officers and one car. Today, the Ajman Police has more than 2000 officers and more than 500 vehicles.

Thanks to the efforts of Ajman Police, in 2025, Ajman was named the second safest city in the world.

In 2025, Ajman Police launched the smart bail service, which made bailing faster, easier and remote.

In 2026, Ajman Police launched a WhatsApp AI chatbot for non-emergency inquiries, which allows the public to receive answers to their non-emergency inquiries around the clock.

== Organizational structure ==
- Commander in-Chief of the Ajman Police
- Deputy Commander in-Chief of the Ajman Police
- Director General of Police Operations
- Director General of the General Directorate of Resources and Support Services
- Director of Strategy and Performance Development Department
- Director of the penal and reform institution administration
- Director of the Criminal Investigation Department
- Director of Operations Management
- Director of the Traffic and Patrol Department
- Director of Licenses of Vehicles and Drivers Department
- Director of the Police of the External Zones
- Director of the Comprehensive Police Stations Administration
- Director of Drug Control Department
- Director of Support Services Department
- Director of Financial Affairs Department
- Director of Human Resources Management
- Director of the Police Training Institute

== Police stations ==
- Al Hamidiyah Comprehensive Police Station
- Al Jurf Comprehensive Police Station
- Industrial Area Police Station
- Mushirif Comprehensive Police Station
- Al Nuaimiya Comprehensive Police Station
- Manama Comprehensive Police Station
- Masfout Comprehensive Police Station
- Al Madinah Comprehensive Police Station
