= Gold souk =

Gold market

A gold souk (Arabic: سوق الذهب) is a gold market in Arab countries of the Arabian Peninsula and particularly in GCC countries. The word souk is mostly used by Arabs for open markets. The term evolved through the expatriates settled in the Gulf Cooperation Council countries and spread to other Asian and Western parts due to the growing number of expatriates in GCC countries. The term is often used to refer to the gold market in Arabized or Muslim cities, but also appears in Western and Asian cities.

The world's largest indoor gold souk is located at Deira, Dubai, UAE.

== Gallery ==
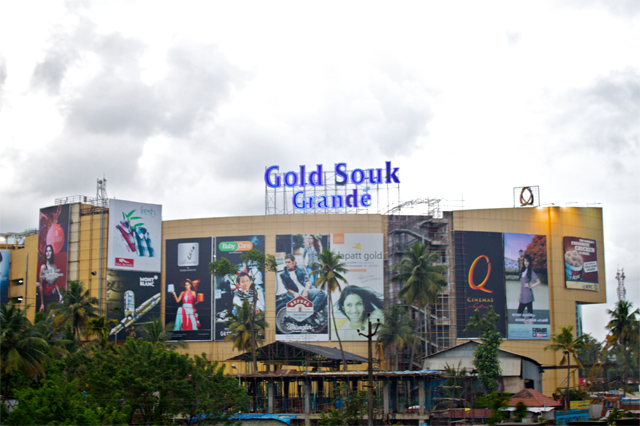
Gold Souk Grande, Kochi, India.

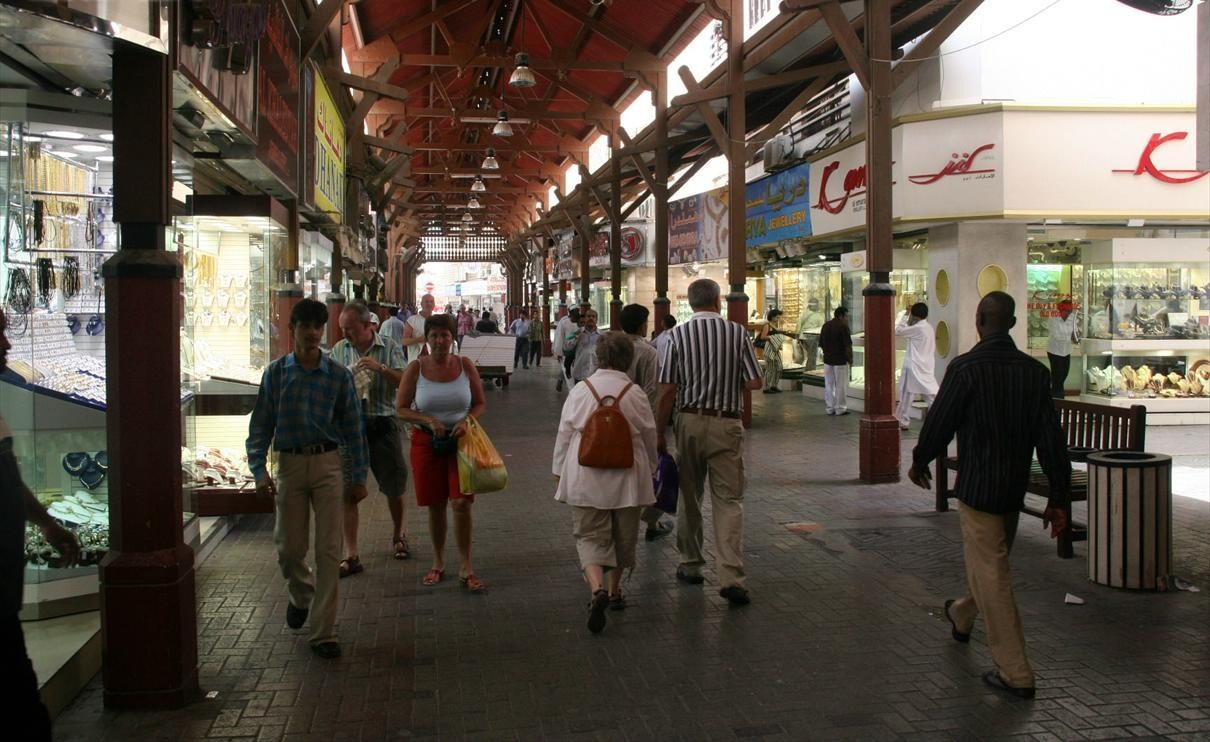
Dubai Gold Souk has narrow lanes that are lined with hundreds of jewellery stores.

== See also ==
- Dubai Gold Souk
- Bazaar
