= Ammar bin Humaid Al Nuaimi =

Crown Prince of the Emirate of Ajman (born 1969)

- Crown Prince of Ajman
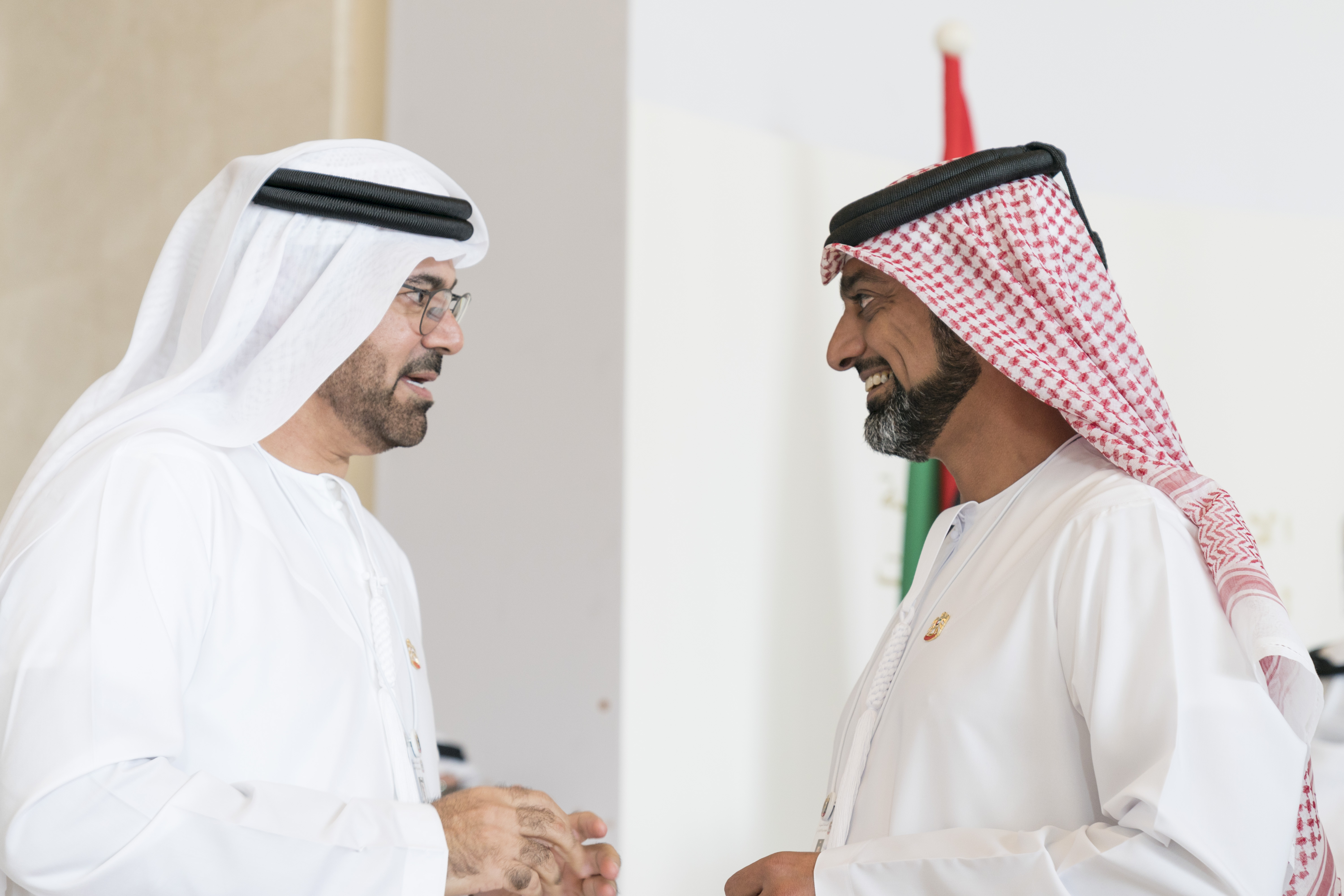
- Ammar bin Humaid Al Nuaimi, (Right) and Mohammed Abdullah Al Gergawi, Minister of Cabinet Affairs, (Left), at the UAE Government Annual Meeting 2017

Crown Prince of Ajman
- Tenure: 9 October 1993 – present
- Monarch: Humaid bin Rashid Al Nuaimi
- Predecessor: Humaid bin Rashid Al Nuaimi
- Born: 31 March 1969 (age 57); Ajman, Trucial States
- Spouse: Asma bint Saqr Al Qasimi
- House: Al Nuaimi
- Father: Humaid bin Rashid Al Nuaimi
- Mother: Amna Ahmad Ghurair

Sheikh Ammar bin Humaid Al Nuaimi (Arabic: عمار بن حميد النعيمي, romanized: ʿAmmār bin Ḥumayd al-Nuʿaymī; born 1969) is an Emirati politician and royal. He is the crown prince of Ajman, one of the constituent seven United Arab Emirates. He has been crown prince since 1993 and chairman of the Ajman Executive Council since 2003.

== Biography ==
Ammar bin Humaid was born in 1969. His father, Humaid bin Rashid Al Nuaimi, is the ruler of Ajman. His mother, Amna Ahmad Ghurair, was the second wife of Humaid bin Rashid and died in 1981. He is a graduate of the Ajman Police Academy.

Ammar bin Humaid is the owner of Ajman Stud which he established in 2002. He has chaired the Ajman Executive Council since 2003. He is also the chairman of Ajman Bank and chairs the Humaid bin Rashid Al Nuaimi Charitable and Humanitarian Foundation.

Ammar bin Humaid is married to Asma bint Saqr Al Qasimi, the sister of Saud bin Saqr Al Qasimi, the ruler of Ras Al Khaimah.
