= Ajman International Airport =

- IATA: QAJ; ICAO: none

Summary
- Airport type: Public
- Owner: Whitelake Consortium
- Serves: Ajman, United Arab Emirates
- Location: Manama, Ajman
- Interactive map of Ajman International Airport

Ajman International Airport (Arabic: مطار عجمان الدولي) is an upcoming airport that is currently a construction project in Ajman, the smallest emirate of the United Arab Emirates. Ajman is surrounded on its landlocked north, south and eastern borders by Sharjah. The airport is being constructed in the eastern district of Ajman, in the Al Manama enclave. The project is worth $571 million and the airport is forecasted to accommodate for 1 million passengers and a minimum of 400,000 tonnes of cargo a year when completed. This is set to enable more accessible travel to Ajman and encourages development on the surrounding area with plans to expand and open hotels, restaurants, commercial offices, residential units, retail, educational centres and exhibition halls. According to a feasibility study by ICTS Europe and Booz Allen Hamilton (BAH) new construction project is set to achieve more than 1 million passengers within the first three years of opening and operating. There is no official opening date.

== Location ==
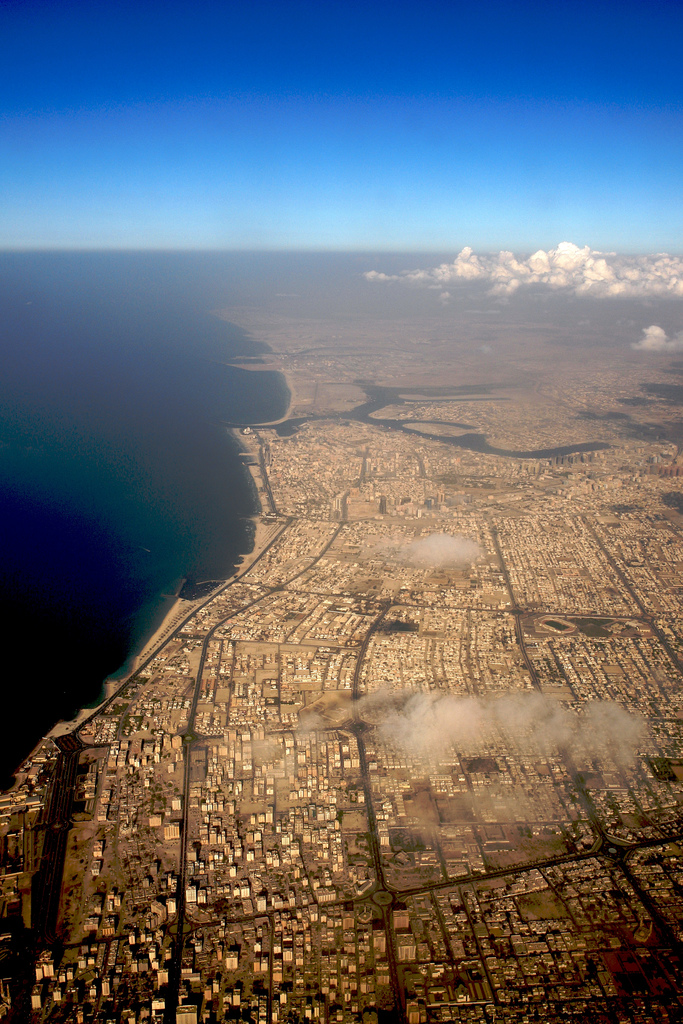
Aerial view of Ajman

Ajman International Airport will be located in the smallest emirate of the United Arab Emirates, Ajman. Ajman is landlocked in the north, south and eastern borders by Sharjah, which is currently home to the closest international airport to Ajman, Sharjah International Airport. The new airport facility is being constructed with an area of 60 million square feet, 60 km away from Ajman City, in the eastern district of Ajman, in the Al Manama enclave, linking Fujairah on the east coast and Sharjah on the west coast. The site is in a location in the heart of the Northern Emirates and connected by the existing road infrastructure to other emirates.

Currently, to engage in international travel, residents of Ajman must travel hours to Dubai and Sharjah to the nearest airport. This further applies to imports and export cargo. This construction project allows for the ease of import and exports of goods to and from Ajman and global destinations.

As 90% of the population currently resides in the city, the Ajman International Airport will help facilitate a wider spread of the population within the emirate along the city and Al Manama enclave.

== History ==
The Government of Ajman granted White Lake Consortium (WLC) the initial sole concession to design, build and operate the upcoming airport. Other corporations involved in this construction project are ICTS Europe, Steel Law, Booz Allen Hamilton (BAH) and Fakhruddin Group, a United Arab Emirates based developer. In September 2014, the Crown Prince of Ajman, Prince Sheikh Ammar Bin Humaid Al Nuaimi provided final approval to Whitelake Consortium (WLC) to build and operate the proposed Ajman International Airport development plan, which is approximately AED1.2 billion (US$570 million). The first phase of the construction project was set to build the initial terminal buildings for departures and arrivals, runways, a cargo complex, aviation school, maintenance workshops, free zone and a commercial zone. The new airport was to have capacity for 1 million passengers annually by 2018. This was to increase Ajman's tourism numbers within the emirate.

In February 2015, the CEO of the Ajman International Airport, Rashidi Omrani claimed the airport was still expected to be completed in 2018. This construction project was said to include extra space for a large MRO centre and a terminal with capacity even greater than 1 million passengers. Delays in the construction of the airport constantly occurring led to a new completion date to be by 31 December 2020.

The facilities of this airport have been designed, with a 4000-metre-long runway, to accept aircraft like the Airbus A380. To expand airport usage facilities to serve the needs of the air cargo and logistics, maintenance and executive aircraft operations will be created.

== Operations ==
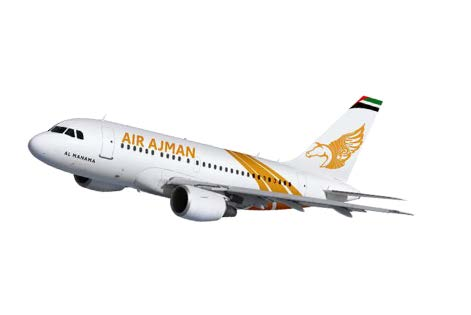
Air Ajman

The Ajman International Airport has operational guidelines based upon those of surrounding emirates. Further intervention, as well as experimentation once the airport begins operating, is required due to the high amount of air traffic with limited air space in the United Arab Emirates.

=== Facilities ===
In these early stages of construction and opening, twenty-five airlines including Emirates, Etihad and Air Arabia have sent letters of intent for landing rights at this airport. To accommodate for employees of the airport as well as other investments in the airport area, multiple residential and commercial properties will be developed alongside this as the airport will be located 60 km outside the Ajman city. The Ajman International Airport has provoked further construction such as retailers and restaurants in the surrounding area, which is able to accommodate to staff of the airport due to the airport's profound distance from the main city centre and residential units. This further accommodates to tourists on limited time layovers, which in turn, boosts economic activity in the emirate.

=== Flight movements ===
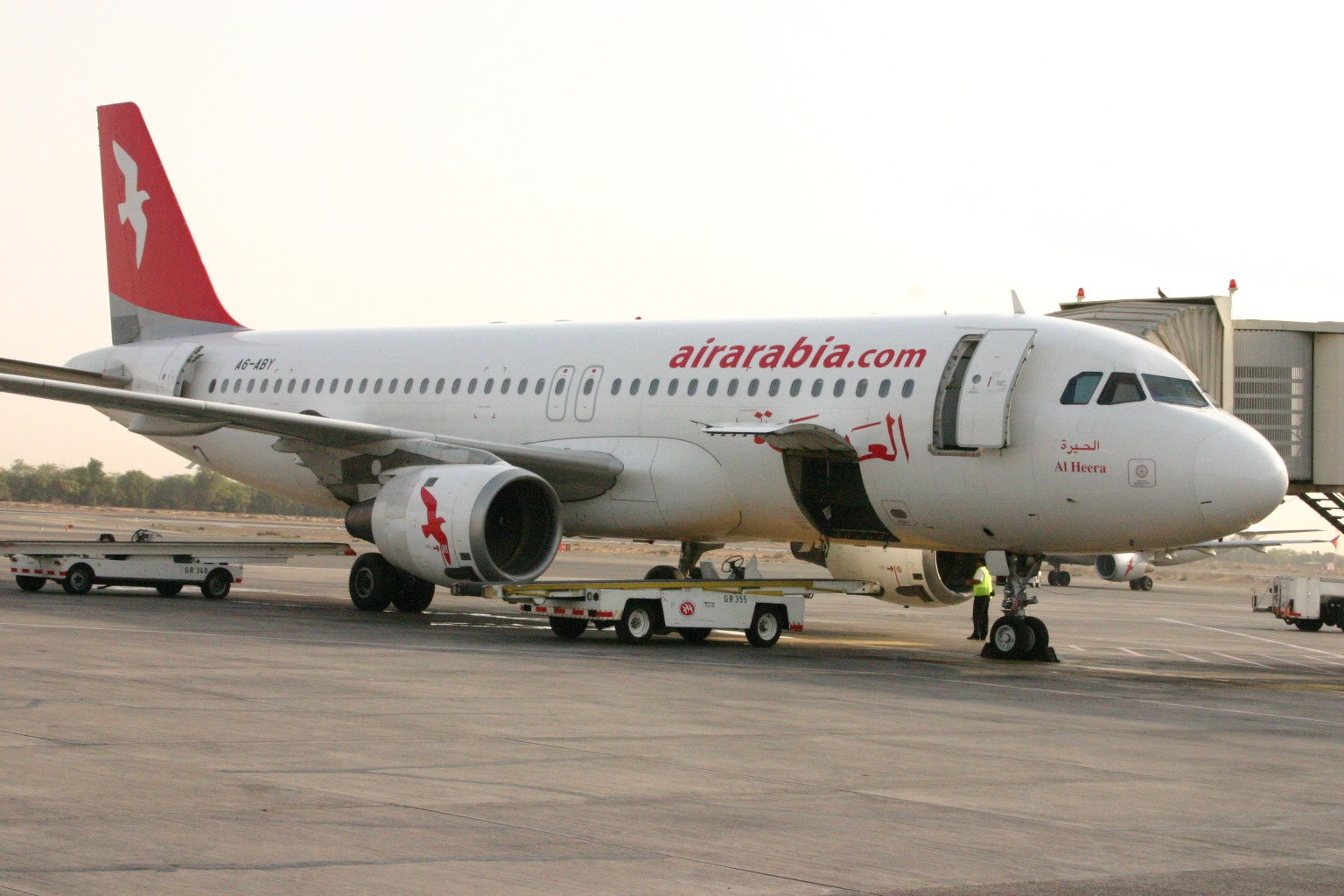
Low cost carrier, Air Arabia

Ajman International Airport, after its initial completion will begin with transporting cargo then with flying passengers to other emirates within the United Arab Emirates and will then further begin its international flights as the domestic flights run smoothly to alleviate any issues with the function and processes. After initial flights, this will further extend passenger flights internationally. As this construction project is not set to be a large international airport to the measure of that of other emirates in the United Arab Emirates, international flights will be limited to closer destinations and accommodate to layovers.

=== Regulation ===
The director of the Aviation Authority, Saif, Al Suwaidi stated that the approval for the operations of the airport in Ajman require evaluating the common airspace and agreements among the other airports operating in the other emirates of the United Arab Emirates including Dubai, Abu Dhabi, Sharjah, Ras Al Khaimah and Fujairah. The close proximity of these five airports poses major challenges for the establishment of the Ajman International airport due to the limited airspace. The Aviation Authority is in the process of holding meetings with all airports, more specifically, in the north of the United Arab Emirates such as Dubai, Sharjah and Ras Al Khaimah to continue achieving the highest level of safety for air traffic in the country. This will be further tested and implemented in the initial stages of opening and running the airport with beginning in low cost carrier (LCC) and cargo transportation as the primary use. Through testing and enforcing different regulations in cargo transportation, the airport will further begin to engage in other functions and processes, including passenger travel.

=== Security ===
Ajman International Airport, being part of the United Arab Emirates will follow after its neighbouring emirates such as Dubai and Abu Dhabi in terms of the security measures taken when entering the country. This further includes restrictions on fire, explosives, illicit substances and guns. This further extends to carry on luggage in terms of liquid, sharp objects and flammable item restrictions. Furthermore, similar to that of Abu Dhabi International Airport and Dubai International Airport, passengers engaging in layover flights will also have security measures with carry on luggage x-ray scanners and walk through metal detectors regardless of whether they will be exiting the Ajman International Airport to go to Ajman itself.

== Airlines and destinations ==
=== Passengers ===
After its opening, Ajman International Airport is set to cater to a minimum of one million passengers per annum and is estimated to rise up to 10.4 million by 2046. This airport is set to be driven largely by low cost carrier (LCC) and cargo operations in the first initial phase of its opening, the new airport is projected to achieve a significant amount of international passenger traffic over five years of it opening. However, 70% of its air traffic is set to come from low cost carriers (LCC) and 30% from regional flights. Although Ajman International Airport is set to cater to this large amount, it is not set to be equal to the measure of airports of other larger emirates such as Abu Dhabi and Dubai, specifically in passenger transportation.

=== Cargo ===
After the opening of the airport, Ajman International Airport intends on beginning its processes and functions with cargo. This allows for the airport to further assess efficiency of the airport's functionality and make improvements fit for passengers to begin travel. Ajman International Airport will accommodate a minimum of 400,000 tonnes of cargo. Due to the emirate's smaller size in terms of area and population, the airport is set to also be smaller than that of neighbouring emirates such as Dubai International Airport and Sharjah International Airport. Therefore, cargo and airport maintenance are set to make up most of the airport's business. This further facilitates trade to occur within the United Arab Emirates and boost the economy by adding additional trading ports, specifically, the Ajman International Airport.

== Access ==
Due to the surrounding construction of residential units to occur around the Ajman International Airport, the commute is set to be quick for locals living in the surrounding area. However, this may be difficult for locals living in Ajman City as the airport construction site is 60 km away from the main city. Due to the minimal public transport available in Ajman, the airport will be accessible mainly by private cars and taxis, specifically for those living in the city. Currently, due to the lack of air transportation in existence in Ajman, residents are required to travel to Sharjah airport, one hour away or Dubai airport, one and a half hours away via a car or one bus from Ajman to Dubai that runs hourly. Ajman is only 12 km from Sharjah Airport, which is the major base for Air Arabia from where approximately 19 airlines operated more than 35,000 scheduled flights in 2017. The current large air transportation hub of Dubai International Airport is a further 15 km away with one of the world's largest passenger air transportation, approximately 81 scheduled passenger airlines and 199,000 flights in 2017.

== Future Expansions and Plans ==
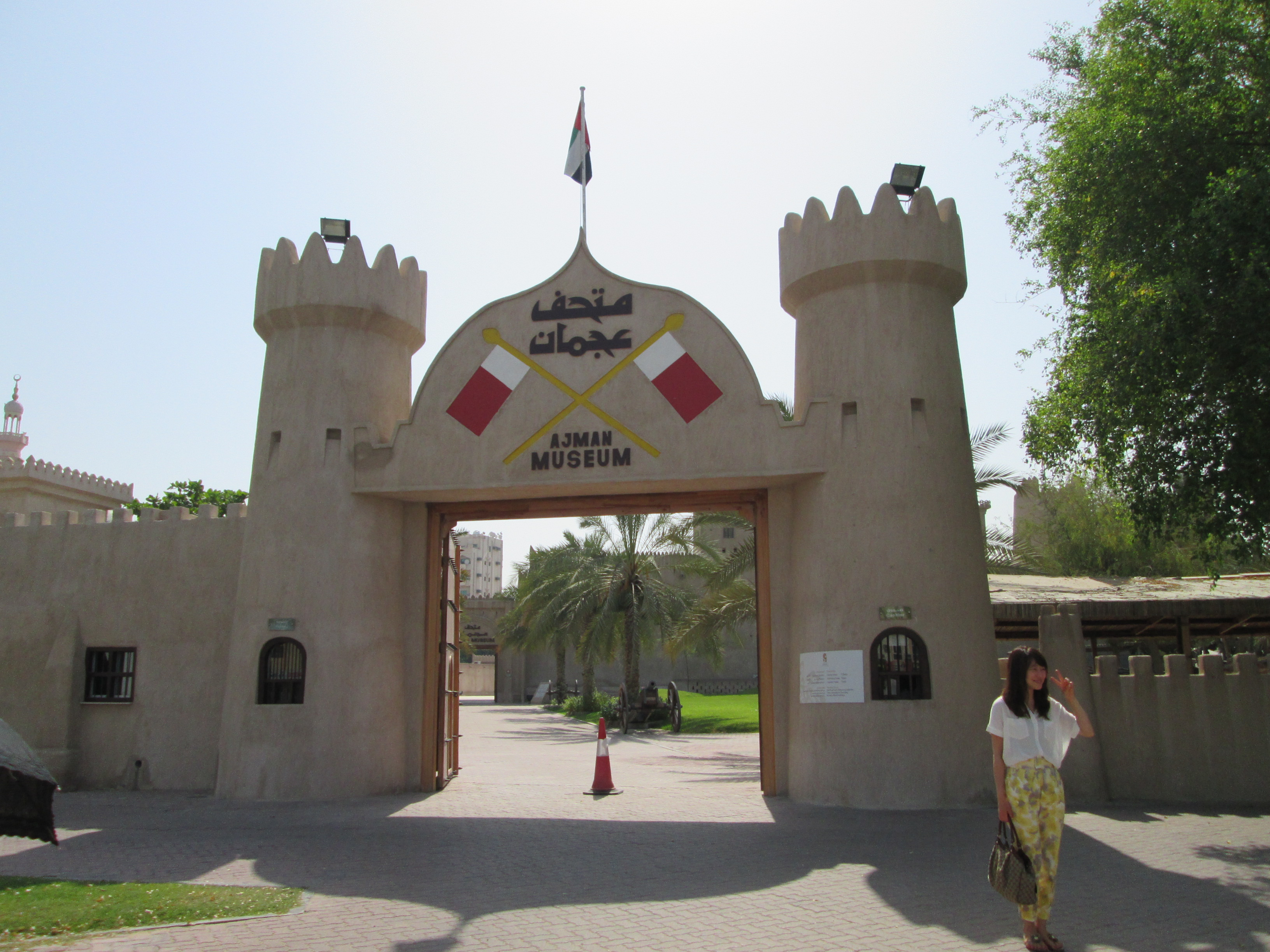
Ajman National Museum

A feasibility study was conducted by ICTS Europe, an aviation specialist and Booz Allen Hamilton (BAH), an international consultancy firm. According to His Highness Shaikh Humaid Bun Rashid Al Nuaimi, member of the Supreme Council and Ruler of the emirate of Ajman, after reviewing the feasibility study, claims the new airport construction project aims to meet the growing demand for aviation infrastructure in the United Arab Emirates. As the Ajman International airport brings more people into this emirate and boosts tourism as well as occupancy of resorts, further expansions and developments of the area will occur. Although this airport does not aim to compete with other larger airports in the country, it aims to further contribute to tourism revenue with a considerable number of hotels also growing in recent years. Tourism in Ajman has been undergoing rapid growth after recovering from the 2008 financial crisis. Popular attractions and locations for tourists, facilitating this rapid growth, include the Ajman National Museum located at Ajman Fort, the Red fort and the museum in the inland enclave of Manama, near where the construction site of the new airport is situated. Ajman's corniche is also a popular tourist destination for families, contributing to this rapid tourism growth, featuring a number of fast food retailers, coffee shops and stalls. Expatriates of Ajman often venture to the ‘Outside Inn,’ a popular watering hole that also possesses a number of hotels such as Ramada, Ajman Palace, the Kempinski, the Ajman Saray, and the Fairmont Ajman, which further boosts economic upturn from tourism in Ajman.

This airport will be open for big businesses and allows to provide more income for the emirate. This airport is estimated to create over 28,000 new jobs such as border security, taxi drivers, retailers, flight attendants, builders and pilots. The United Arab Emirates plans to invest $USD136 billion in aviation infrastructure in the next 10 years and has an estimate of 15 million to tourists by 2020. Taking into consideration this growth in tourism, this airport construction project, aims to expand and open more hotels, restaurants, commercial offices, residential units, retailers, educational centres and exhibition halls. The additional construction projects to come in response to the Ajman International Airport are further set to boost the overall economy for the emirate alongside the airport.
