= Rashid bin Humaid Al Nuaimi =

- Sheikh

Ruler of Ajman
- Reign: 1816–1838
- Successor: Humaid bin Rashid Al Nuaimi
- Died: 1838
- House: Al Nuaimi

Sheikh Rashid bin Humaid Al Nuaimi was the Ruler of Ajman, one of the Trucial States which today form the United Arab Emirates (UAE), from 1816–1838, leading a force of 50 men to take control of the town from members of the Al Bu Shamis tribe who had settled there and also at Al Heera. At the time, Ajman was a dependency of Sharjah. Five years after his establishment at Ajman, the fort was taken by the Darawisha Bedouin who were removed by the action of the Ruler of Sharjah, Sheikh Saqr bin Sultan Al Qasimi.

Relatively little is known about the reign of Rashid bin Humaid. He was signatory to the 1820 General Maritime Treaty with the British, becoming one of the first Rulers of the Trucial States, later to become the United Arab Emirates (UAE).

The Nuaimi name derives from the Na'im tribal confederation which dominated the area around Buraimi and the Northern movement of the tribe, the Al Bu Kharabain appears to have settled in Ajman, as well as the area of Al Heera, Hamriyah and even Sharjah. He acceded to the General Maritime Treaty of 1820 following the British punitive expedition from Bombay against the Al Qasimi at Ras Al Khaimah. In 1819, that force bombarded the coastal settlements of the Gulf Peninsula, including Ajman, leading to the capitulation of the coastal Sheikhs and the signing of the treaty in Ras Al Khaimah and Sharjah. Rashid bin Humaid signed the treaty on 15 March 1820, together with Sheikh Abdullah bin Rashid Al Mualla, Ruler of Umm Al Quwain. Both Rulers signed the treaty at Falayah, an inland dependency of Ras Al Khaimah.

Rashid led his people in a war against Sohar, in coalition with Sultan Said of Muscat and in 1831 boats from Ajman took some dozen vessels and their cargoes sailing from Sohar. Two British gunboats were despatched to Ajman and reparations were demanded and paid.

He died in 1838 and was succeeded by his son, Humaid bin Rashid Al Nuaimi.
