= Rashid bin Humaid Al Nuaimi II =

- Sheikh

Ruler of Ajman
- Reign: 1864–1891
- Predecessor: Humaid bin Rashid Al Nuaimi
- Successor: Humaid bin Rashid Al Nuaimi II
- Died: 1891
- House: Al Nuaimi

Rashid bin Humaid Al Nuaimi II was the Ruler of Ajman, one of the Trucial States which today form the United Arab Emirates (UAE), from 1864 to 1891. His reign, while largely peaceful, saw the expansion of Wahhabi influence in the Trucial States.

== Al Zorah fort ==
Rashid was involved in the attempt to build a fortification at Al Zorah, on the coast of Ajman to the south of Hamriyah. Originally an uninhabited sandy island surrounded by mangrove swamps, in 1866 Khalid bin Sultan Al Qasimi of Sharjah, supported by Rashid bin Humaid and with the financial assistance of the Wahhabi agent, Turki bin Ahmed Al Sudairi, erected a fort there. As the development 'threatened the peace of the coast' according to the British, it was bombarded by the British ship HMS Highflyer and reduced to rubble.

== Maritime Peace ==
Ajman during Rashid's reign benefited from an initial period of relative peace and calm that followed the 1853 Perpetual Maritime Treaty, when both maritime trade and pearl fishing were able to both thrive and prosper. One of the rare major breaches of that treaty was to come in 1882, when a number of boats from Ajman were implicated in an attack on a Turkish-flagged boat, the 'Fath Al Karim', in the Red Sea. Not only had Ajman boats taken part in the raid, but the booty had been landed at Ajman. The British promptly despatched HMS Arab to Ajman and nine boats of Ajman's fleet were burnt as an example. A spat between Sharjah and Ajman boats broke out on the pearling banks in 1884, resolved this time by the British burning the Sharjah boat.

In 1885, the son of the ruler of Umm Al Quwain quarrelled with his father and fled to Ajman seeking protection. Rashid bin Humaid Al Nuaimi refused to hand the young man over, and so Sharjah and Umm Al Quwain joined forces against Ajman. Ahmed bin Abdullah Al Mualla of Umm Al Quwain landed fifty men at Al Heera, on Ajman's southern border, transporting them there in two baggalas. He now found himself in trouble with the British for his breach of the Maritime Truce. Visited in Umm Al Quwain town by HMS Reindeer, Ahmed bin Abdullah was brought to book for his action, but raids continued between Umm Al Quwain and Hamriyah, Ajman's northern neighbour.

Although the seas were relatively calm, a number of events took place over Rashid's reign to disturb the peace on land. Principle among these was the constant problem of absconding debtors. Escaping a debt, a trader would flee from one emirate and take refuge in the next, leading to constant breakdowns in the relationships between the coastal communities. Rashid bin Humaid signed the 'Absconding Debtors Agreement' of 24 June 1879, which the British hoped would act as an effective instrument of extradition between the Rulers.

In November 1885, Hasher bin Maktoum Al Maktoum of Dubai forged an alliance with Rashid bin Humaid against Sharjah and forces from both towns skirmished against Sharjah's borders until, on 20 January 1886, a force of 1,000 men of Dubai, Ajman and Hamriyah attacked Sharjah town, killing forty men and wounding another twenty-five. Saqr bin Khalid Al Qasimi of Sharjah appealed to the British, who stepped in and arbitrated a deal whereby Dubai agreed to peace with Sharjah if Saqr bin Khalid of Sharjah would renounce his alliance with Umm Al Quwain.

This now left Dubai, Ajman and Hamriyah ranged against Umm Al Quwain but then Ras Al Khaimah took Umm Al Quwain's side. Raiding again broke out, with Ras Al Khaimah attacked by Shihuh raids from the mountains instigated by Dubai's Hasher bin Maktoum. An attempt at mediation by Abu Dhabi failed, and in May 1886 Hamriyah raided Umm Al Quwain. The Hamriyah fighting men then took to the pearl banks for the season, unwisely leaving their town undefended. Umm Al Quwain lost no time in falling on the town of Hamriyah, destroying property and capturing slaves and trade goods.

Rashid bin Humaid died in 1891.
