= Humaid bin Rashid Al Nuaimi =

Sheikh within the UAE

- Sheikh

Ruler of Ajman
- Reign: 1838–1841
- Predecessor: Rashid bin Humaid Al Nuaimi
- Successor: Abdelaziz bin Rashid Al Nuaimi
- Reign: 1848–1864
- Predecessor: Abdelaziz bin Rashid Al Nuaimi
- Successor: Rashid bin Humaid Al Nuaimi II
- Died: 1864
- House: Al Nuaimi

Humaid bin Rashid Al Nuaimi was the Ruler of Ajman, one of the Trucial States which today form the United Arab Emirates (UAE), from 1838 to 1841, when he was deposed by his brother, Abdelaziz bin Rashid Al Nuaimi. Humaid ruled from Abdelaziz' death in 1848 until his own death in 1864.

== Accession ==
Humaid acceded following the death of his father, Sheikh Rashid bin Humaid Al Nuaimi. Rashid's eldest son, Ali, was a businessman and had removed himself from day to day involvement in the majlis and had no interest in becoming Ruler. The family nominated Humaid to take the position. He married a daughter of Sheikh Sultan bin Saqr Al Qasimi who was, at the time, Ruler of Sharjah and Ras Al Khaimah and with whom Humaid was closely allied. In 1841, Humeid's brother Abdelaziz took possession of Ajman fort and declared himself Ruler.

Abdullah bin Sultan Al Qasimi the governor of Sharjah under Sultan Bin Saqr – led a failed foray against Ajman in January 1848, attempting to seize the town’s fort and restore Humaid bin Rashid to his position as ruler.

Following the failure of this attempt, Humaid had only to wait until the end of the year for his brother to make way for his restoration. In 1848 Abdelaziz was killed in a war against Hamriyah when he led 400 men against the town with huge consequent loss of life and Humaid, who was also wounded in the conflict, became Ruler once again.

Humaid was a signatory to the 1853 Perpetual Maritime Truce with the British. The treaty followed the ten year treaty of peace, intended to protect the pearling fleets during the annual fishing seasons, proposed by Samuel Hennell. The 1853 Treaty, signed with Captain Arnold Burrowes Kemball, the British Resident at Bushire was to be, as the name suggests, in perpetuity and signed between 4 and 9 May 1853 by Saeed bin Tahnun Al Nahyan of Abu Dhabi together with Abdullah bin Rashid Al Mualla of Umm Al Quwain; Saeed bin Butti Al Maktoum of Dubai and Sultan bin Saqr Al Qasimi, ‘Chief of the Joasmees’.

Sheikh Humaid died in 1864 and was succeeded by Sheikh Rashid bin Humaid Al Nuaimi II.
