= Ajman Real Estate Regulatory Agency =

Ajman, United Arab Emirates based government regulatory authority

Coordinates: 25°23′34″N 55°26′10″E

- مؤسسة عجمان للتنظيم العقاري

Agency overview
- Jurisdiction: Emirate of Ajman
- Headquarters: Ajman, United Arab Emirates
- Agency executive: Abdulaziz Humaid Al Nuaimi, Chairman
- Website: ajmanre.gov.ae

The Ajman Real Estate Regulatory Agency (ARRA, ARERA or Ajman RERA) is an Ajman, United Arab Emirates based government regulatory authority responsible for the regulation and licensing of Ajman's real estate market, consumer protection and dispute resolution. However, ARRA does not resolve disputes concerning rent of property units.

== Jurisdiction and legal powers ==
All land, villas and apartments, freehold or otherwise within Ajman, must be solely registered with ARRA. Noncompliance may result in the developer being fined 100,000 AED (27,233.12 USD) onwards. ARRA is also responsible for certifying escrow bank accounts.

== See also ==
- Dubai Real Estate Regulatory Agency
