= Dubai Real Estate Regulatory Agency =

The Real Estate Regulatory Agency (RERA; Arabic: مؤسسة التنظيم العقاري) is a government agency to regulate the real estate sector in Dubai, the governmental Dubai Land Department. It's a head agency which forms, regulates and authorizes the real estate sector in Dubai. RERA was founded on 31 July 2007 by His Highness Sheikh Mohammed Bin Rashid Al Maktoum, Vice President and Prime Minister of the United Arab Emirates and Ruler of Dubai.

== Aims of founding ==
To set policies and plans in the real estate sector in Dubai in order to increase foreign investments. RERA is a part of Dubai Land Resources Department. The agency has its own financial and administrative independence with full legal authority to regulate the real estate sector in Dubai.

RERA provides transparency and effectiveness of legal framework, when everyone involved in the property market can conduct a business. In this concept RERA aims to develop an on-line society for investors, developers and buyers, as well as for supporting sectors (banks, law firm and insurance companies) could cooperate with each other and with RERA.

== Responsibilities ==
- licensing all real estate activities
- managing real estate developers' trust account
- licensing real estate agents
- regulating and registering rental agreements
- regulating and supervising the owners associations
- regulating real estate advertisements in the mass media
- regulating and licensing real estate exhibitions
- publishing studies for the sector
- enhancing national participation in the real estate sector

RERA also informs people on regulatory acts when buying and renting the real estate in Dubai. Land resources can be in security until the building up is finished. The land can be divided but only after a certain approval according local planning. The land given cannot be either bought nor sold until the written direction of His Highness Sheikh Mohammed Bin Rashed Al Maktoum is received. According to the policy of confidentiality the Dubai Land Department doesn't publish any information about its clients. Information about the land conditions can be given when the Dubai Land Department studies the condition of Land relations.

In November 2013, Dubai Land Department launched an online real estate portal designed for sale, rental and auctions of properties, as well as for exchanging private and public real estate information.

== Management ==
The director of the agency is Marwan Bin Ghalita.

== See also ==
- Ajman Real Estate Regulatory Agency
