= Humaid bin Rashid Al Nuaimi III =

Ruler of Ajman (born 1931)

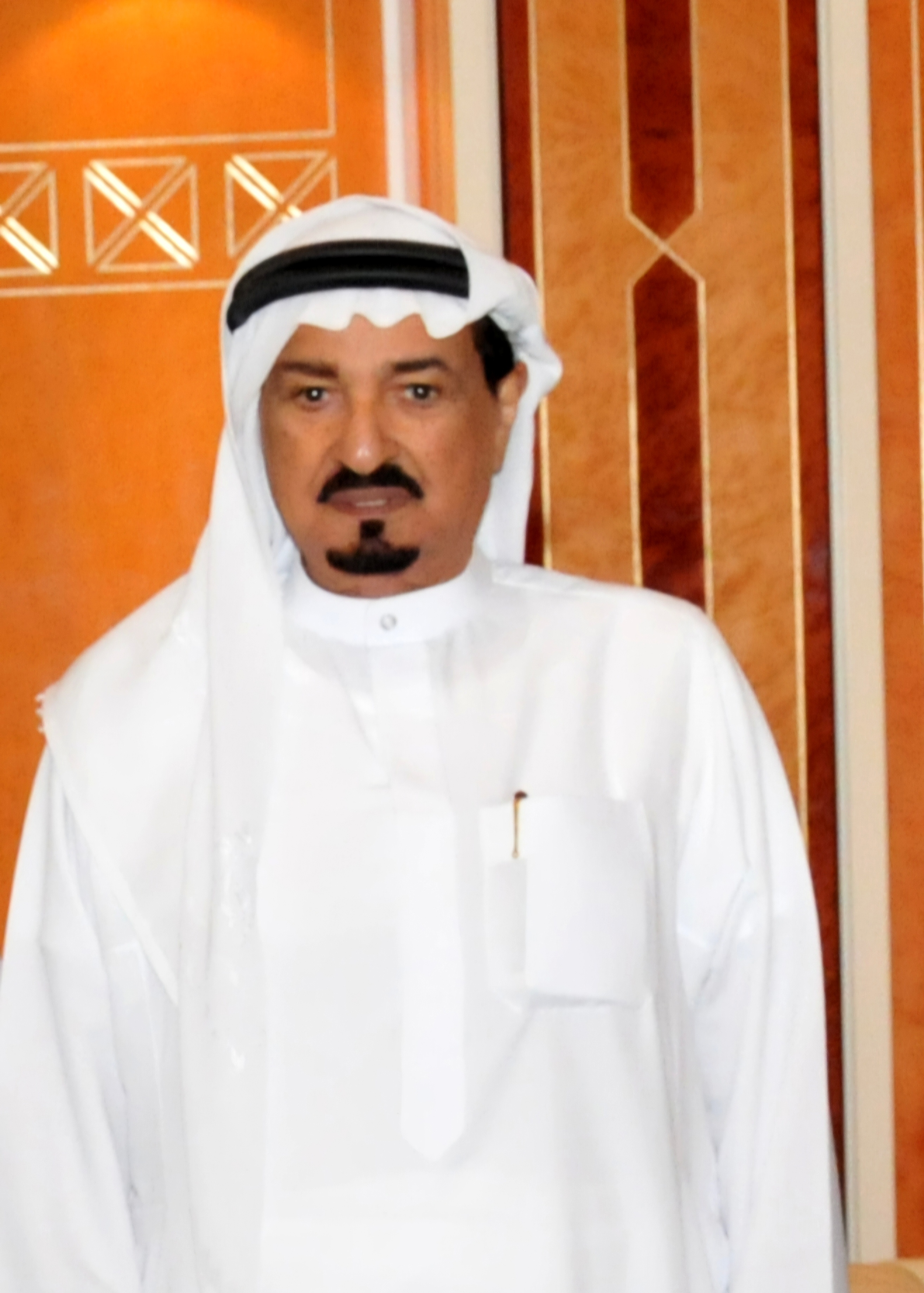
- Al Nuaimi in 2013

Ruler of Ajman
- Reign: 6 September 1981 – present
- Predecessor: Sheikh Rashid bin Humaid Al Nuaimi III
- Heir apparent: Sheikh Ammar
- Born: 1931 (age 94–95); Ajman, Emirate of Ajman, Trucial States
- Spouse: Sheikha Fatima bint Zayed bin Saqr Al Nahyan
- Issue: Sheikh Ammar; Sheikh Ahmed; Sheikh Abdulaziz; Sheikh Rashid; Sheikha Aisha; Sheikha Fatima
Names
- Humaid bin Rashid Al Nuaimi الشيخ حميد بن راشد النعيمي
- House: Al Nuaimi
- Father: Rashid bin Humaid III

Sheikh Humaid bin Rashid Al Nuaimi III (Arabic: حميد بن راشد النعيمي, romanized: Ḥumayd bin Rāshid al-Nuʿaymī; born 1931) is the tenth ruler of the Emirate of Ajman and a member of the Federal Supreme Council of the United Arab Emirates. Humaid bin Rashid succeeded his father Sheikh Rashid bin Humaid Al Nuaimi III on 6 September 1981. He previously served as deputy ruler since 1960.

== Early life and family ==
Humaid bin Rashid received his early education in Dubai in the 1940s and 1950s and later went to Cairo for further studies. In the early 1970s he became active in the affairs of state, as Ajman joined the United Arab Emirates in December 1971 and he was required to act as the deputy ruler. He belongs to the Al Na'im tribe.

His sister was the late Sheikha Fatima bint Rashid Al Nuaimi, who died on 14 December 2014. Her only son is the ruler of Fujairah, Sheikh Hamad bin Mohammed Al Sharqi.

One of the spouses of Humaid bin Rashid Al Nuaimi is Sheikha Fatima bint Zayed bin Saqr Al Nahyan. His child from this marriage is Rashid bin Humaid Al Nuaimi.

His children include:

- Sheikh Ammar bin Humaid Al Nuaimi, Crown Prince and President of the executive board (born 1969).
- Sheikh Ahmed bin Humaid Al Nuaimi, Chairman of the Economic Department.
- Sheikh Abdulaziz bin Humaid Al Nuaimi, Chairman of the Department of Culture and Information.
- Sheikh Rashid bin Humaid Al Nuaimi IV, Chairman of Ajman Municipality and Planning and Chief of Ajman Club, head of R Holding and the owner of City University College of Ajman, President of UAEFA (UAE Football Association)
- Sheikha Aisha bint Humaid Al Nuaimi
- Sheikha Fatima bint Humaid Al Nuaimi

== Education ==
Humaid bin Rashid received his early education in Dubai in the 1940s and 1950s and later went to Cairo for further studies.

== Emiri decrees in Ajman ==
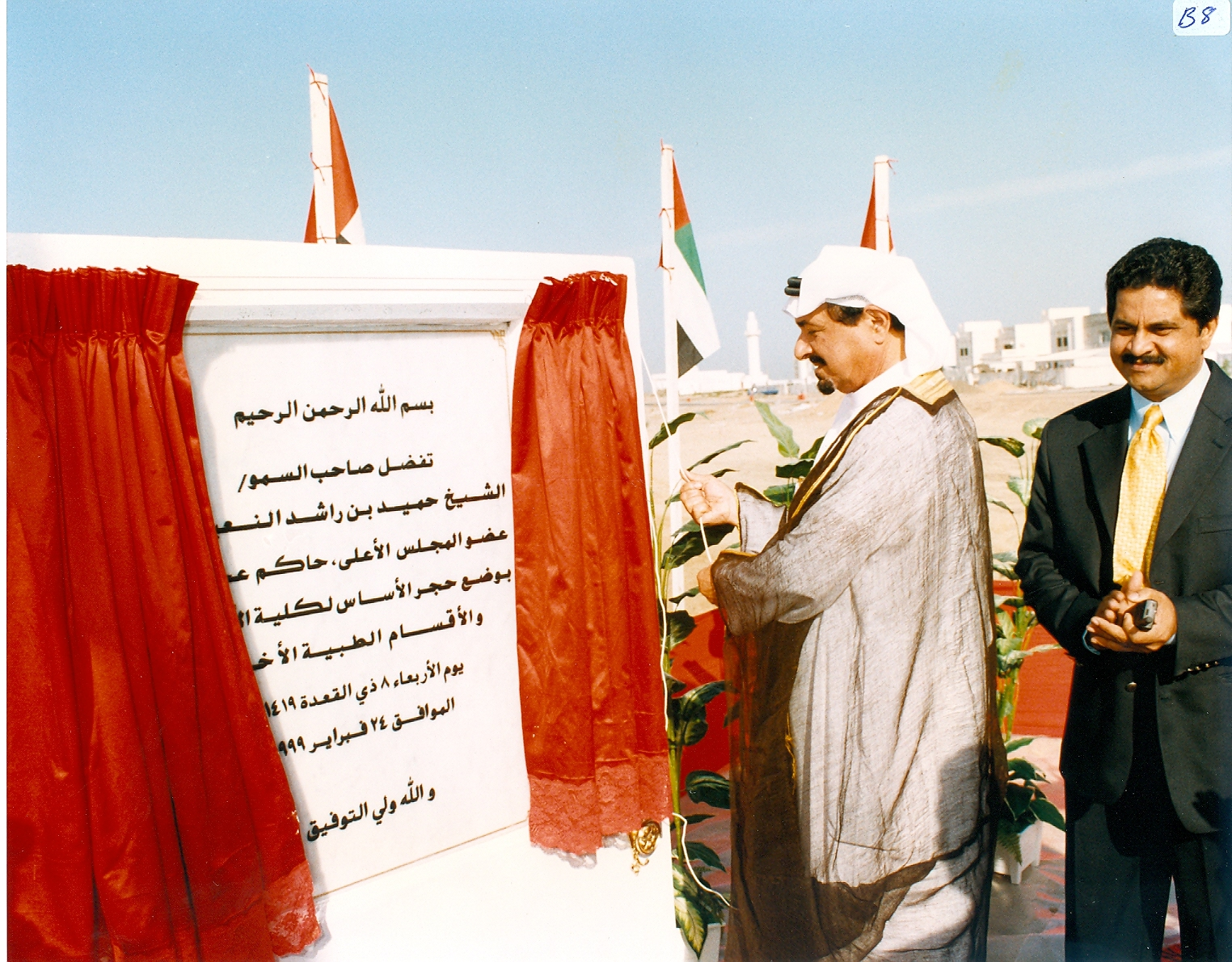
Al Nuaimi inaugurating the Gulf Medical University, 1998

Al Nuaimi issued on 11 September 2021 Emiri Decree No. 9, establishing the Protocol and Hospitality Department in the Emirate of Ajman. The decree includes 15 articles after the definitions, and the department will be located in the Emiri Court. Under the decree, the newly-establishment department reports directly to his son, Crown Prince Ammar bin Humaid Al Nuaimi. The department is tasked with providing hospitality for the Ruler of Ajman, the Crown Prince and members of the ruling family, as well as their guests, in accordance with the local and international standards.

In March 2020, he issued Emiri decree No. 6 renaming the Central Department for Legal Affairs of the Ajman Government to the "Department of Legal Affairs of the Ajman Government".

== Philanthropy ==
In 2020, Al Nuaimi paid for the social and educational expenses of six Sudanese orphans whose parents died of COVID-19. He also helps his country with education.

Marking forty years since his accession, the newspaper Al Bayan reported that in 1983 he launched the Rashid bin Humaid Award for Culture and Science, described as the first education award at the level of the state; that in 1984 he founded the International Charity Organization (Hay'at al-A'mal al-Khayriyya al-'Alamiyya) and a social solidarity fund to help young men who wish to marry; that in 1988 he sponsored the founding of Ajman University College, the emirate's first private university-level institution; and that in 1998 he issued the decree establishing the Gulf Medical University.

== Honors and awards ==
- United Kingdom: Honorary PhD in Law from University of Bedfordshire (2009)
- Malaysia: Honorary PhD in Philosophy from the International Islamic University (2011)
- United Arab Emirates: Hamdan bin Rashid Al Maktoum Award for Distinguished Academic Performance (2011)
