= Postage stamps and postal history of Sharjah =

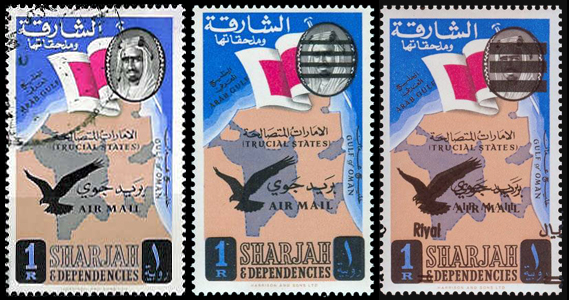
The first definitive issue of postage stamps of Sharjah (UAE), 1 riyal, 1963 and 1965, with Saqr bin Sultan Al Qasimi overprinted following the coup

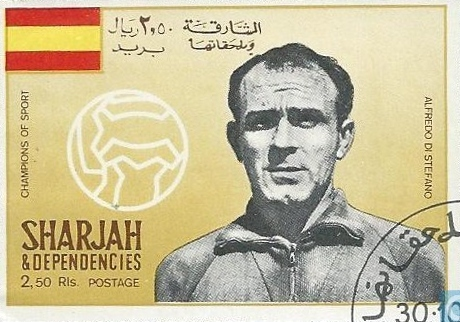
1968 Sharjah stamp depicting footballer Alfredo Di Stéfano

Civil mail from Sharjah went through the post office in Dubai until 1963. Military mail from the British Forces stationed in the area went through the RAF airport in Sharjah.

On 10 July 1963, Sharjah opened its own post office and began to issue its stamps and postal stationery under the name of Sharjah & Dependencies (which included Kalba, Khor Fakkan, and Dibba). There were also unauthorized overprints using Hamriyah, a frequently secessionist coastal town but officially subject to Sharjah and which never gained recognition as a Trucial State in its own right.

Sharjah and its dependencies joined the United Arab Emirates on 2 December 1971, but continued to issue its own stamps. On 31 July 1972, the UAE assumed full postal responsibilities. Nevertheless, Sharjah continued to use its own stamps until the issuance of the first UAE definitive series on 1 January 1973. Covers with mixed UAE and Sharjah frankings are known.

== Dunes issues ==
In 1963, Britain ceded responsibility for the Trucial States' postal systems. An American philatelic entrepreneur by the name of Finbar Kenny saw the opportunity to create a number of editions of stamps aimed at the lucrative collector's market and in 1964 concluded a deal with a number of Trucial States to take the franchise for the production of stamps for their respective governments. Kenny had made something of a specialty out of signing these deals, also signing with the Rulers of Ajman and Fujairah in 1964 – and getting involved in a bribery case in the USA over his dealings with the government of the Cook Islands. The issue of stamps from Ajman's dependency of Manama – a tiny agrarian village in the remote plains at which a 'post office' was opened – is a perfect example.

These stamps, luridly illustrated and irrelevant to the actual emirates they purported to come from (editions included 'Space Research' and 'Tokyo Olympic Games') became known as 'dunes'. Their proliferation quickly devalued them. Because of this, many popular catalogues do not list them.

== See also ==
- Postage stamps and postal history of Abu Dhabi
- Postage stamps and postal history of the United Arab Emirates

== References and sources ==
Notes

Sources

- Stanley Gibbons Ltd: various catalogues
- Encyclopaedia of Postal Authorities
- Sharjah and dependencies – stamps and postal stationery on-line catalogue.
- Sharjah postal history
