= Postage stamps and postal history of the United Arab Emirates =

A 1986 stamp of the UAE

This is a survey of the postage stamps and postal history of the United Arab Emirates (UAE). (Note: The UAE consists of seven states, termed emirates, which are Abu Dhabi, Dubai, Sharjah, Ajman, Umm al-Quwain, Ras al-Khaimah and Fujairah. The capital and second most populous city of the United Arab Emirates is Abu Dhabi. Before 1971, the UAE was known as the Trucial States or Trucial Oman, in reference to a 19th-century truce between the United Kingdom and several Arab Sheikhs.)

== Early mails ==
The first post office in the region was opened in Dubai in 1909. Dubai had one post office which was Indian in origin, under the Sind circle, and opened on 19 August 1909. Until 1947, Indian stamps were in use and are distinguished by the cancellation "Dubai Persian Gulf". Pakistani stamps were used until 31 March 1948.

== British postal agencies in Eastern Arabia ==
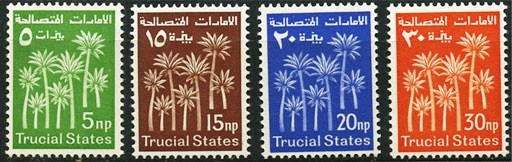
1961 Trucial States stamps

Britain managed the Trucial States' external relations (a result of the 1892 Exclusive Agreement treaty), including the management of posts and telegraphs – the states were not members of the UPU – the Universal Postal Union). The Government of India opened its first post office in Dubai in 1941 and its operation was taken over by British Postal Agencies, a subsidiary of the GPO (General Post Office) in 1948. Stamps of the time were British stamps surcharged with rupee values, until in 1959 a set of 'Trucial States' stamps was issued from Dubai.

Following the Partition of India, the British postal agencies in Eastern Arabia were established. The British agency stamps issued in Muscat were sold in Dubai until 6 January 1961. The agency issued the Trucial States stamps on 7 January 1961.

In Abu Dhabi, an agency was opened on Das Island in December 1960 and in Abu Dhabi City on 30 March 1963, using British agency stamps issued in Muscat. The Trucial States stamps were not used in Abu Dhabi.

As each emirate took over its own postal administration, the offices closed: Dubai on 14 June 1963; Abu Dhabi on 29 March 1964.

The northern emirates proceeded to issue a number of editions of stamps intended for the collector's market – particularly Ajman, Umm Al Quwain and Sharjah. Known today as Dunes, they are colourful and virtually worthless.

== First Emirati stamps ==
The UAE issued its first Federal stamps on 1 January 1973. Before then, the individual emirates issued their own stamps.

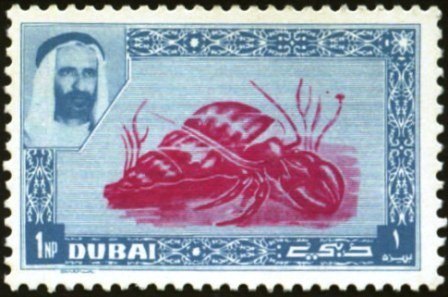
Stamp of Dubai, 1963

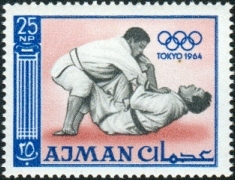
Stamp of Ajman, 1965

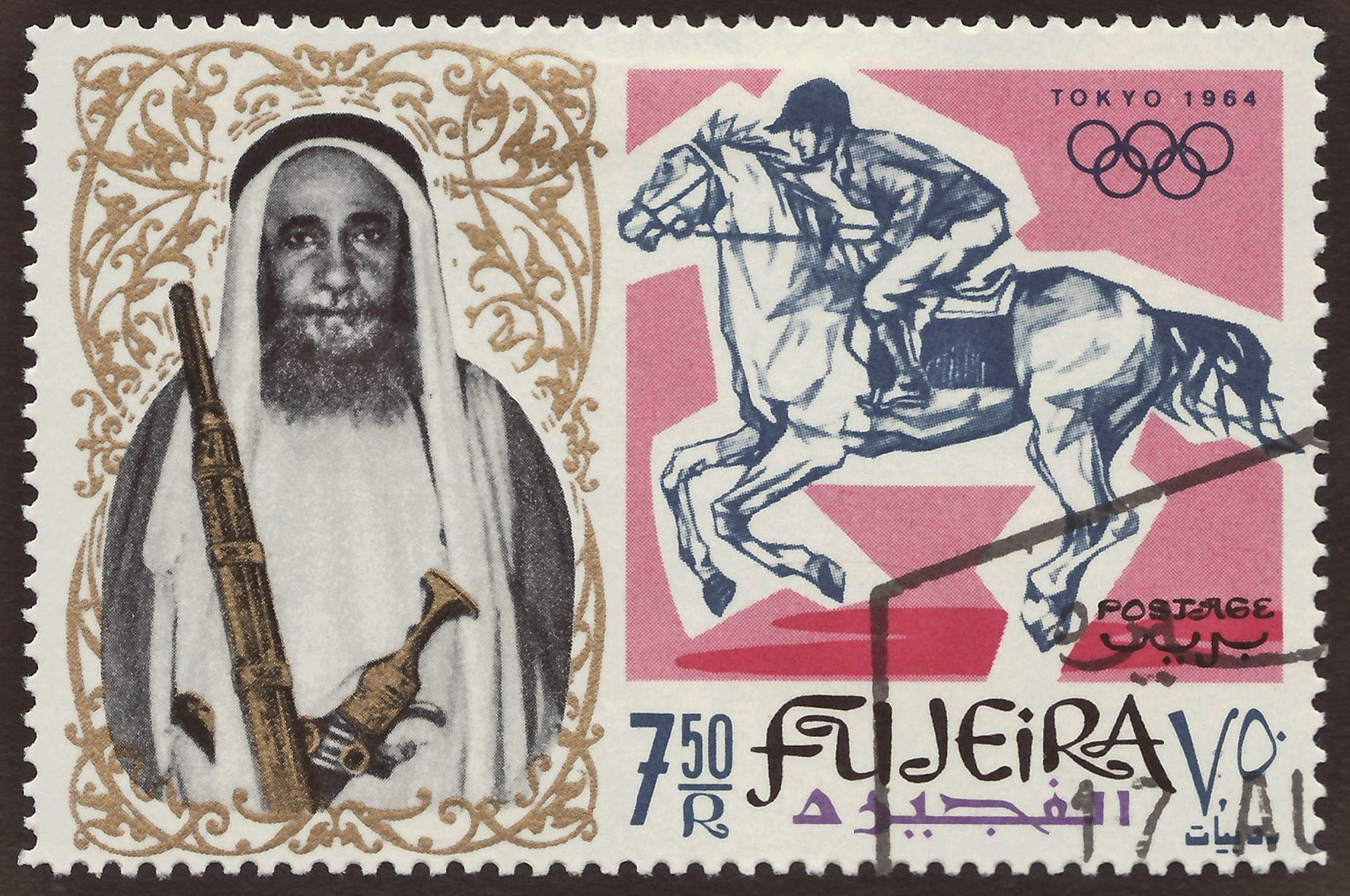
Stamp of Fujairah, 1964

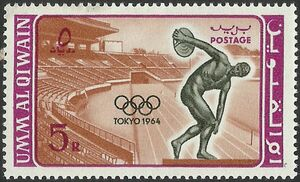
Stamp of Umm al-Quwain, 1964

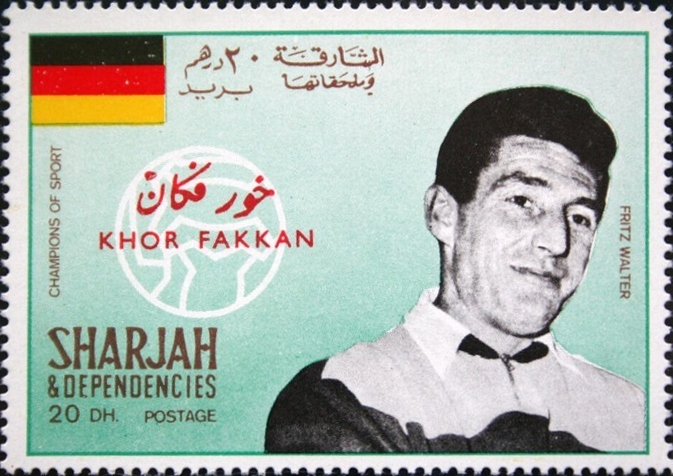
Stamp of Sharjah, 1968

== See also ==
- Dunes (stamps)
- British postal agencies in Eastern Arabia
- Postage stamps and postal history of Abu Dhabi
- Postage stamps and postal history of Sharjah
- Revenue stamps of the United Arab Emirates
