= Dunes (stamps) =

Stamp series of the United Arab Emirates

Dunes in philately are the many editions of stamps produced in the Trucial States (today the United Arab Emirates or UAE). The stamps, printed in profusion in the 1960s and early 1970s, are of historical curiosity but are mostly near-worthless today.

== History ==
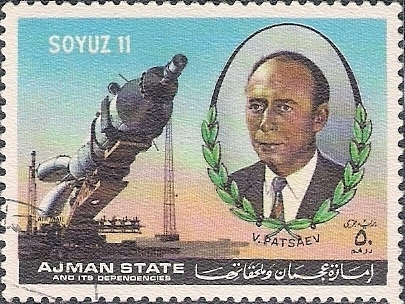
An Ajman "Dunes" stamp of 1972, showing Soyuz 11 and Viktor Patsayev. As with all of these collector's editions, they are irrelevant in subject matter to the state they purport to originate from.

Britain managed the Trucial States' external relations (a result of the 1892 Exclusive Agreement treaty), including the management of posts and telegraphs - the states were not members of the UPU - the Universal Postal Union). The Government of India opened its first post office in Dubai in 1941 and its operation was taken over by British Postal Agencies, a subsidiary of the GPO (General Post Office) in 1948. Stamps of the time were British stamps surcharged with rupee values, until in 1959 a set of "Trucial States" stamps was issued from Dubai.

The Trucial States began printing their own postage stamps in 1961 – even though the population was largely illiterate. In fact, the only post office in the seven sheikdoms was in Dubai (established by the British in 1909). The Trucial States issued an 11-stamp issue from 1961-63, printed in London, showing palm trees and the like, withdrawn in June 1963.

In 1963, Britain ceded responsibility for the Trucial States' postal systems to the Rulers of the Trucial States. An American philatelic entrepreneur, Finbar Kenny, saw the opportunity to create a number of editions of stamps aimed at the lucrative collector's market and in 1964 concluded a deal with the cash-strapped emirate of Ajman to take the franchise for the production of stamps for the government. Kenny had made something of a specialty out of signing these deals, also signing with the Ruler of Fujairah in 1964, and getting involved in a bribery case in the U.S. over his dealings with the government of the Cook Islands.

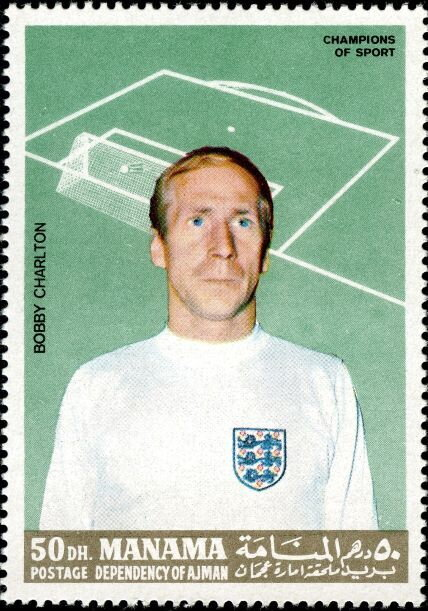
Manama stamp of 1968, depicting English footballer Bobby Charlton. As with other Dunes stamps, subjects were chosen to appeal to foreign collectors.

Similar stamps issued from six of the seven emirates, and several of their exclave dependencies:

- Ajman
  - Manama, Dependency of Ajman
- Dubai
- Fujairah
- Ras al Khaima
- Sharjah issued both stamps and souvenir sheets
  - Khor Fakkan, Dependency of Sharjah. Between 1965 and 1969, Khor Fakkan issued approximately 226 different stamps.
  - Al Dhaid issued Sharjah stamps with "Oasis of Dhaid" overprint
- Umm Al Quwain

Among these editions, following the opening of a "post office" in Manama on 5 July 1966, were nine editions published from 'Manama, Dependency of Ajman'. Few collectors would realise Manama was a remote agricultural village consisting of a few adobe houses on a plain overlooked by the Hajar Mountains. Manama issued six stamps in 1966 to over 700 in 1972 alone (ending in 1973 when the UAE took control of the postal service).

In addition, some of the stamps issued by Qatar during this period portray subject matter of interest to U.S. and European stamp collectors, but irrelevant to nationals.

These stamps, luridly illustrated and irrelevant to the actual emirates they came from (editions included "Space Research" and "Tokyo Olympic Games" and a martyrs series featuring Jesus Christ (on stamps of a Muslim emirate), John Kennedy, and Martin Luther King. Two odd editions issued from Umm Al Quwain including "British Kings and Queens" and, with summer temperatures in Umm Al Qawain reaching 50 °C, "Winter Olympics"), became known collectively as "dunes".

Abu Dhabi did not participate.

== Value ==
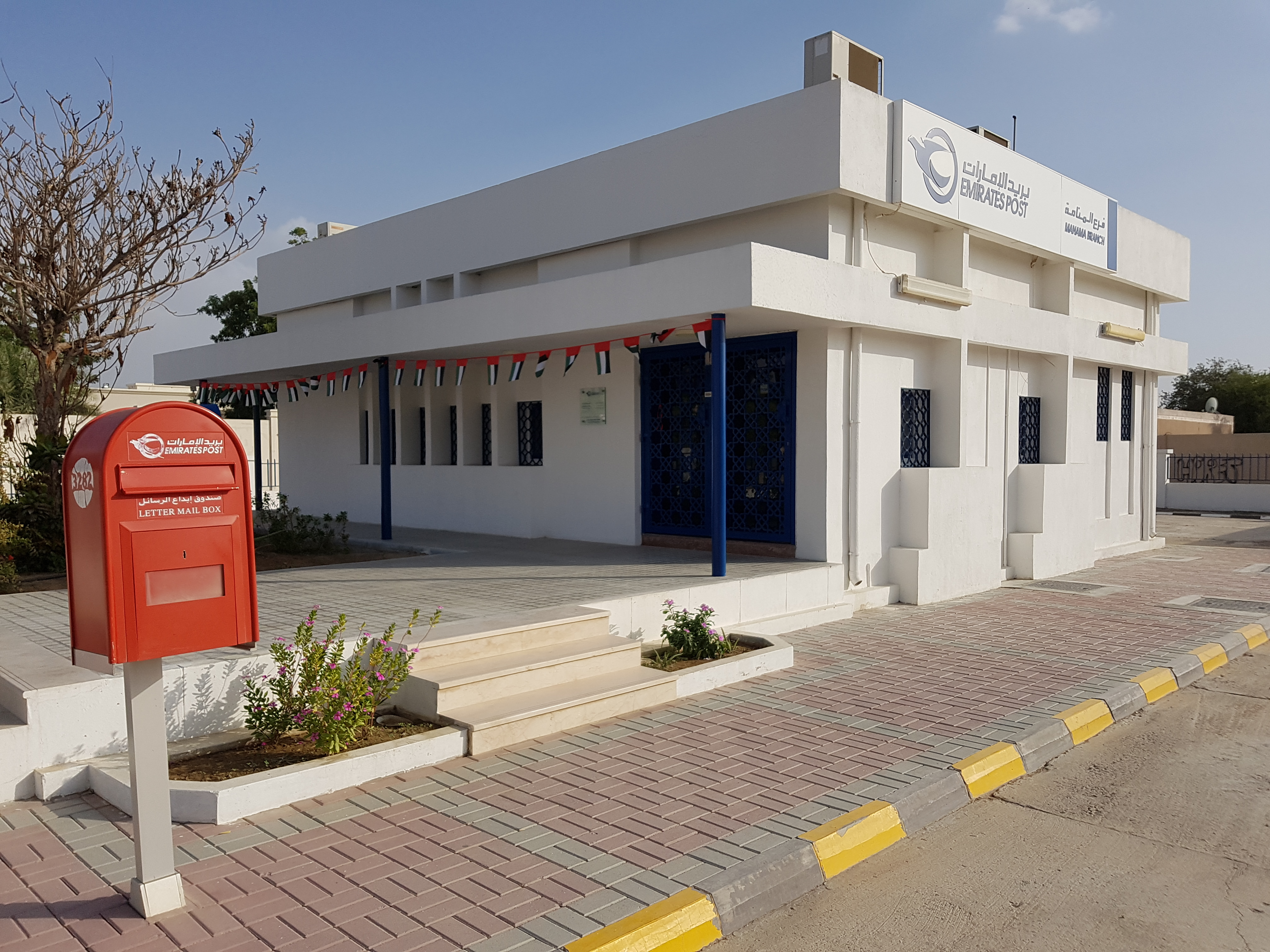
Manama post office in December 2017.

The sale of postage stamps was for a short time a lucrative trade for the emirates, most of whom (with the exception of Abu Dhabi, which struck oil in 1965) had few other sources of revenue. Revenues of up to £70,000 for the poorer states fell, however, to £30,000 with the inevitable saturation of the market. Their sale by 1966 constituted the main source of revenue for the northern Trucial States.

Their proliferation eventually devalued them and, because of this, many popular catalogues today do not even list them.

Among these editions, following the opening of a "post office" in Manama on 5 July 1966, were nine editions published from 'Manama, Dependency of Ajman'. Few collectors would realise Manama was a remote agricultural village consisting of a few adobe houses on a plain overlooked by the Hajar Mountains.

Kenny's arrangements ended when the United Arab Emirates was formed in December 1971.

== See also ==
- Postage stamps and postal history of the United Arab Emirates
