= Sweet Homes Group of Companies =

Real estate business in the United Arab Emirates

- Type: Private company
- Industry: Real estate
- Founded: 2003; 23 years ago
- Headquarters: Ajman, United Arab Emirates
- Products: Property development, property sales, citizenship for property investment program
- Website: sweethomesgroup.com

Sweet Homes Group of Companies is a real estate business in the United Arab Emirates. The company was started in 2003 and primarily functions in Dubai and Ajman. The group is into general engineering & contracting, general trading and real estate brokerage, managements agents and consultancy.

== Projects ==
- Ajman Uptown (US$598 Million)
- Hotel Apartments (US$38 Million)
