= Dubai–Sharjah–Ajman metropolitan area =

Dubai–Sharjah–Ajman منطقة دبي والشارقة وعجمان الكبرى DSA
- Metropolitan area
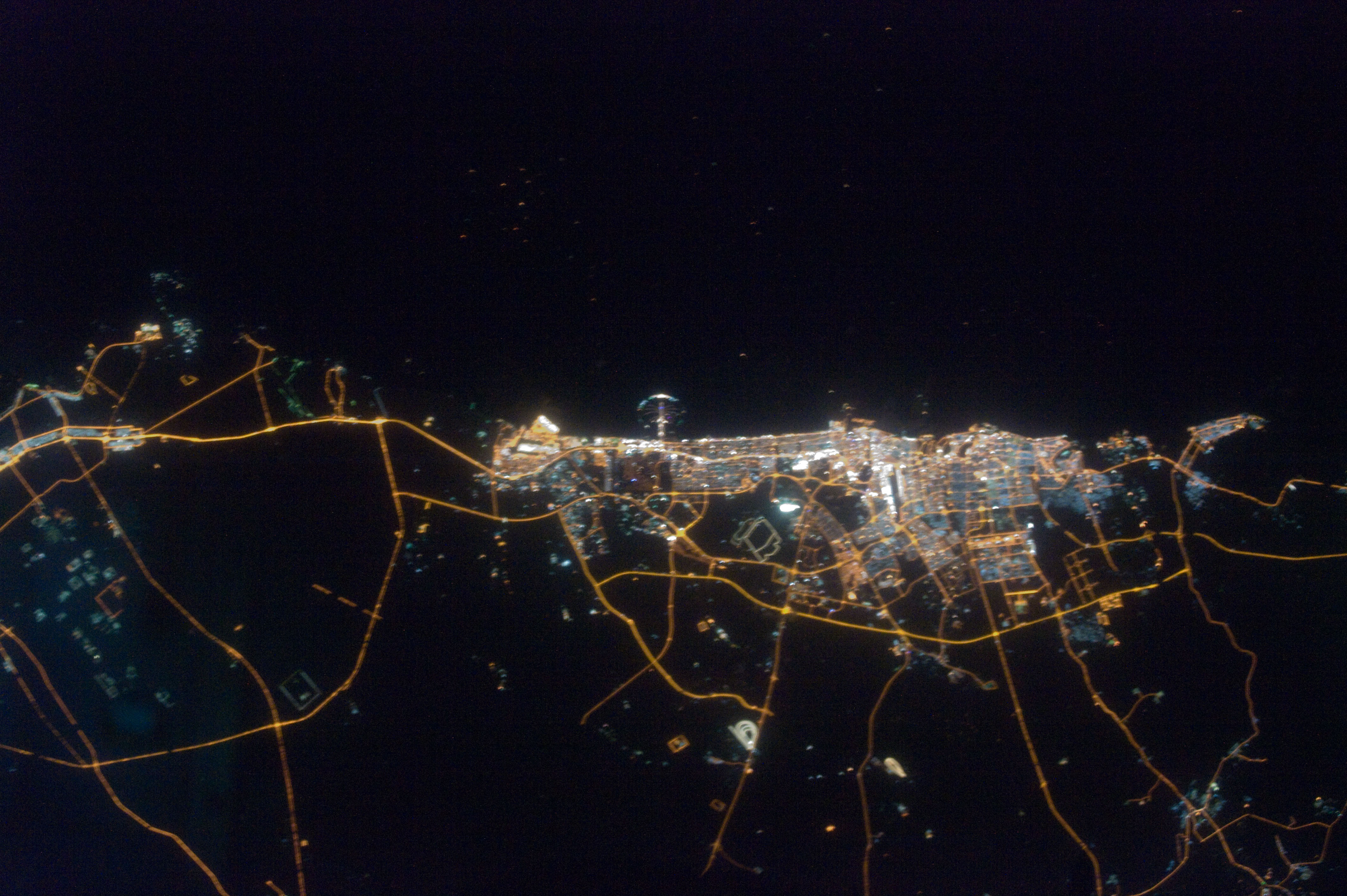
- Dubai-Sharjah-Ajman metropolitan area seen from satellite at night

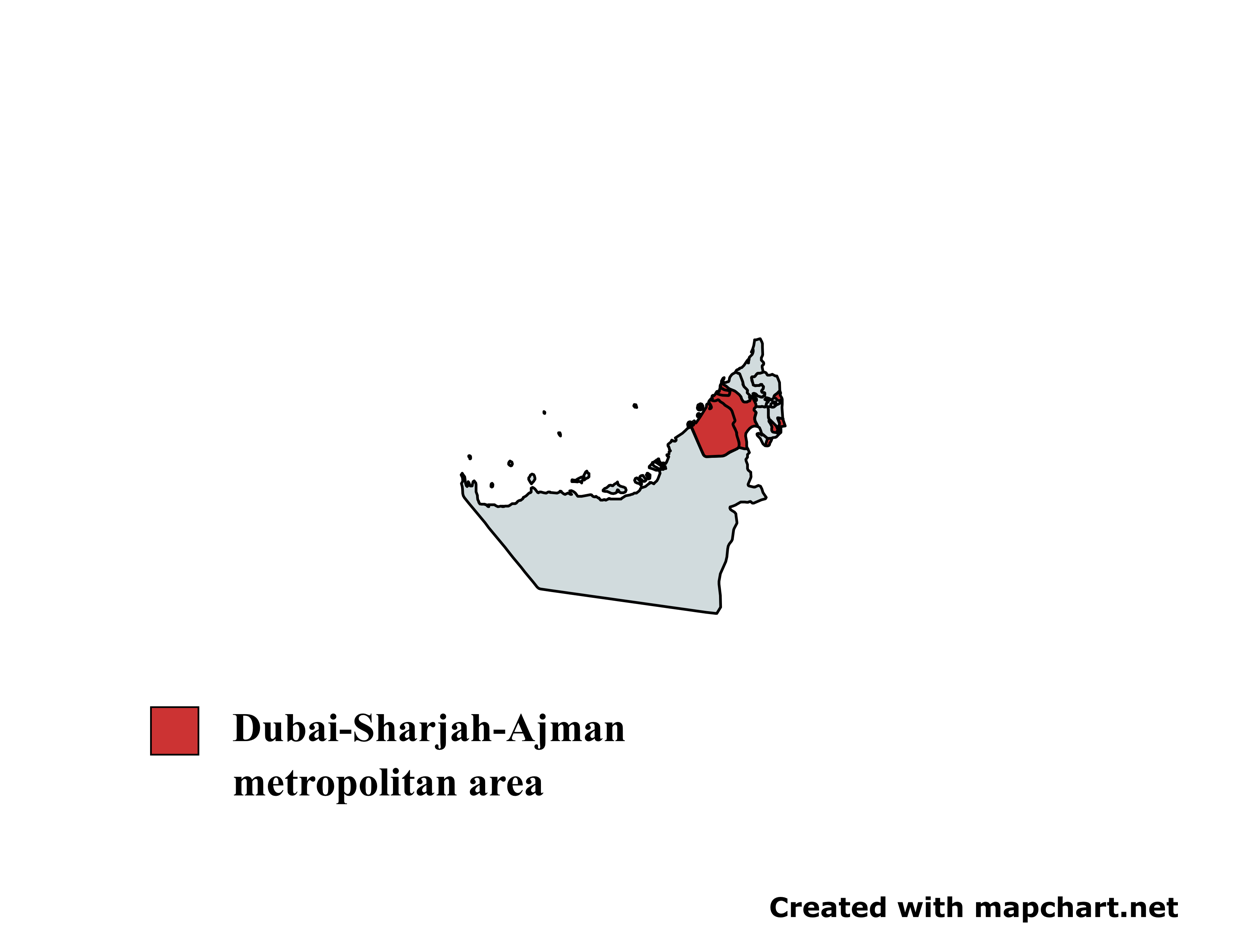
- Dubai–Sharjah–Ajman metropolitan area
- Coordinates: 25°21′27″N 55°23′27″E
- Country: United Arab Emirates
- Emirate: Dubai, Sharjah, Ajman

Area
  - Metro: 1,994 km^{2} (770 sq mi)

Population
  - Metro: 6,176,155
  - Metro density: 3,097/km^{2} (8,022/sq mi)

GDP
  - Metro: US$ 202.8 billion (2023)
  - Per capita: US$ 33,800 (2023)

Dubai–Sharjah–Ajman (DSA) (Arabic: منطقة دبي والشارقة وعجمان الكبرى), is the largest and most densely populated metropolitan area in the United Arab Emirates, located along the central section of the country's coast. It encompasses the contiguous urban territories of the cities of Dubai, Sharjah, and Ajman, forming a singular socio-economic zone governed by three separate emirates.

With a population of 6.3 million, this region is characterized by intense interdependence, high rates of cross-emirate commuting, and shared infrastructure, forming the UAE’s principal urban corridor. The area is also part of a wider conurbation that extends into parts of Umm Al Quwain and western Ras Al Khaimah, though those areas are not included in standard definitions of the DSA core. This metropolitan area represents one of the most densely populated and economically significant regions in the Middle East.

Seal	City	Area km^{2}	Population	GDP
	Dubai	1,610	3,944,751	US$ 134.6 billion
	Sharjah	236	1,909,930	US$ 58.9 billion
	Ajman	148	504,846	US$ 9.3 billion
	Dubai–Sharjah–Ajman metropolitan area	1,994	6,359,527	US$ 202.8 billion

== See also ==
- Abu Dhabi Metropolitan Area
- Dammam-Dhahran-Khobar metropolitan area in Saudi Arabia
