= Revenue stamps of the United Arab Emirates =

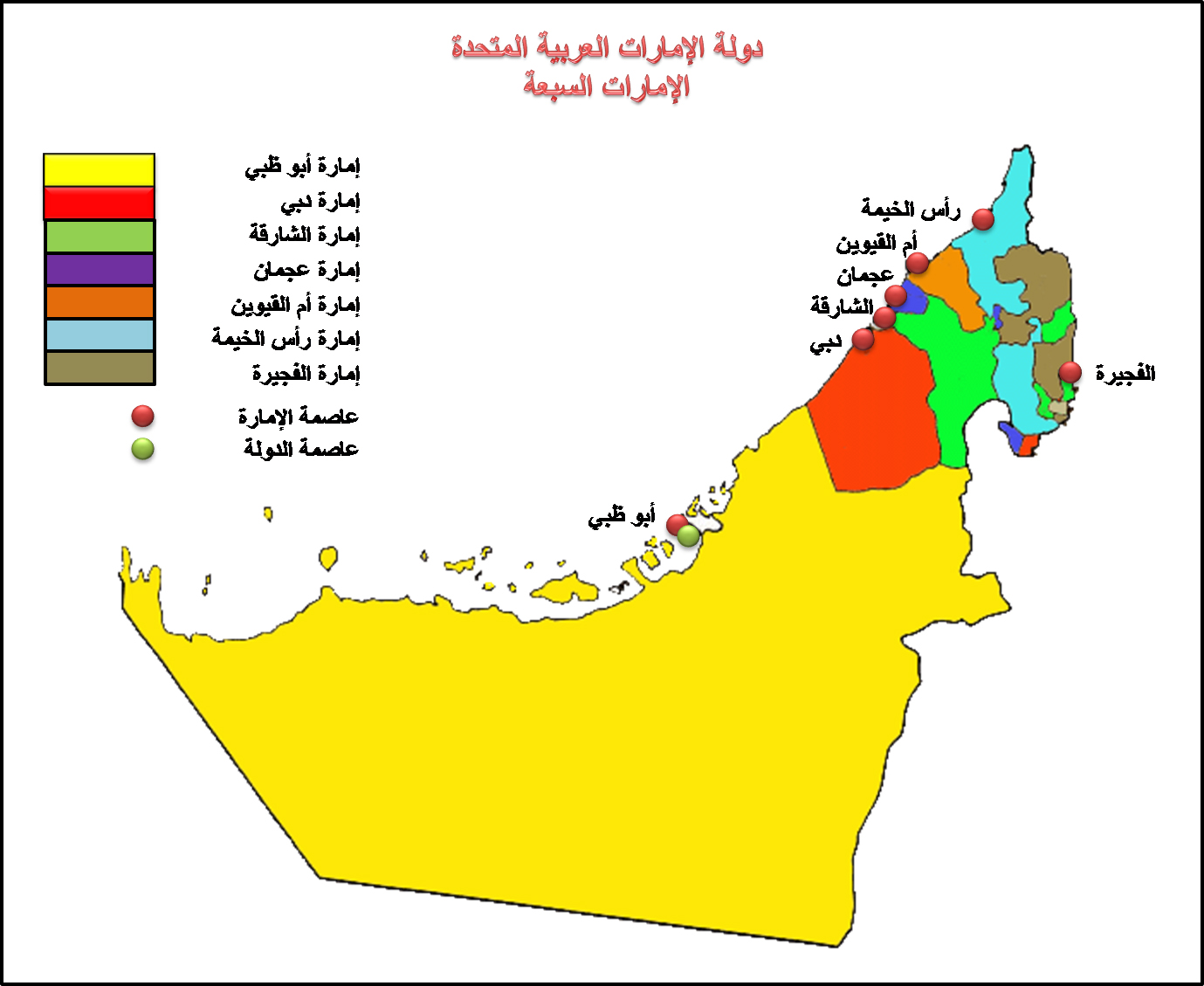
Map of the United Arab Emirates with Abu Dhabi in yellow and Dubai in red

The United Arab Emirates, formerly known as Trucial States, first issued revenue stamps in 1948 and continues to do so to this day. In addition, the emirates of Abu Dhabi and Dubai also had their own separate revenue issues.

== Trucial States ==
Prior to independence, the UAE was known as the Trucial States. Until 1947 they were administered as a part of British India, and they used Indian revenues. However, following India's independence they were administered by Britain, using Indian currency. The first revenue issue was in 1948, and it consisted of British King George V or King George VI keytypes appropriated COURT FEE and the value in annas or rupees at the bottom. Similar issues with values in naye paise or later paise were printed using keytypes of King George VI and Queen Elizabeth II. However, there are no recorded examples of these, and only values from the first issue are known to exist.

== United Arab Emirates ==
After independence in 1971, the Trucial States became known as the United Arab Emirates. The first revenues were issued in around 1973 and they showed a dhow, a palm tree, an oil rig and camels, and a map and symbols of the newly independent country. In 1975 a new design portraying the coat of arms was issued, and all later stamps were in this design. From 1988 onwards, stamps in this design but a different inscription below the coat of arms were also issued to pay the medical fee as well.

== Abu Dhabi ==
The emirate of Abu Dhabi issued revenues from around 1970 to 1990. The first consisted of an overprint on the contemporary 1 dinar postage stamp in use then, and this was followed by a set of three values portraying the country's coat of arms in around 1985. The highest value of this set was reissued in new colours with some differences in design in 1990. All of Abu Dhabi's revenue stamps are scarce or rare and are highly sought after by collectors.

== Dubai ==
The emirate of Dubai issued a single revenue stamp by the Central Immigration Department. The stamp is recorded used from 1972 to 1973.

== See also ==
- Postage stamps and postal history of Abu Dhabi
- Postage stamps and postal history of the United Arab Emirates
