= Skyports =

British UAV manufacturer

Skyports Drone Services
- Industry: Drone delivery
- Genre: Delivery drone
- Founded: 2018
- Founder: Duncan Walker & Simon Morrish
- Headquarters: London, England
- Area served: Ireland, Scotland, United States, Singapore
- Website: skyportsdroneservices.com

Skyports Drone Services is a British provider and operator of eVTOL drones for cargo delivery, survey and monitoring. The company became famous for using drones to carry Covid-19 samples and test kits in some parts of Argyll and Bute which has been described as a UK first. It also received UK Government funding for establishing service and training facility at Argyll and Bute Council-owned Oban Airport.

The company was founded in 2018 by Duncan Walker & Simon Morrish. It is headquartered in London with additional offices located in Singapore, Dubai, Columbia and Japan.

In 2020 Skyports Drone Services was authorised by the Scottish government to carry Covid-19 kits from Mull, Clachan-Seil and Lochgilphead to Lorn and Islands Hospital in Oban. It was jointly funded by the UK Space Agency and the European Space Agency.

The Royal Mail partnered with it to launch a postal service using drones in Scotland. In 2023, they announced a Hub Operator Program for participants in Colombia, UAE, the UK, Kenya, and Korea.

== Operations ==
- Scotland
- Ireland
- United States
- Singapore

== Certificates ==
The Irish Aviation Authority (IAA) have issued the light UAS (Unmanned Aircraft Systems) operator certificate (LUC) to Skyports Drone Services and recognised across all 31 EASA member countries. It received Part 107 Waiver to fly UAS BVLOS (Beyond Visual Line Of Sight) and Part 375 Foreign Aircraft Permit in the USA.

In Singapore, it has received Class 1 Activity Permit for UAS Operations and UA Operator Permit (UOP) to fly BVLOS from the Civil Aviation Authority of Singapore.

== Project ==
Royal Mail and Skyports Drone Services announced the launch of the Orkney I-Port operation, a drone delivery project established in partnership with Orkney Islands Council Harbour Authority and Loganair.

Royal Mail and Skyports Drone Services have established a daily inter-island mail distribution service between three islands on Orkney. The project will initially operate for three months, with the intent to extend in the future. This is the first UK drone delivery project which can be conducted on a permanent basis under existing regulatory frameworks.

Recently, Skyports Drone Services announced Speedbird Aero as new aircraft partner for the Orkney I-Port operation, a drone delivery project established in partnership with Royal Mail, Orkney Islands Council Harbour Authority and Loganair. Speedbird Aero has been selected as the latest aircraft partner to join Skyports Drone Services’ world-class drone fleet. The Brazilian drone manufacturer will provide its DLV-2 aircraft for Skyports Drone Services’ global delivery and logistics projects, starting with three months of inter-island delivery flights for Royal Mail for the Orkney I-Port project.

== See also ==
- Skyports Infrastructure
