= Aisha Al Kaabi =

Emirati writer, poet, artist and translator

Aisha Khalaf Al Kaabi
- Born: 7 May 1973 (age 53); Ajman, UAE
- Education: MA in Developmental Biology and Tissue Culturing from the University of Arkansas, 2001.
- Alma mater: United Arab Emirates University
- Occupations: Poet, short story writer, artist, translator
- Writing career
- Notable works: No Consolation for House Cats, 2011.

Aisha Khalaf Al Kaabi (Arabic: عائشة خلف الكعبي; born 8 May 1973) is an Emirati poet, short story writer, artist, and translator. She has been a member of Emirates Writers Union since 1997. She won the Emirates Women Award in Literature and Art in 2011 for her book No Consolation for House Cats. In 2012, she opened her own publishing house "IQRAni".

== Biography ==
Al Kaabi was born in the Emirate of Ajman, on 7 May 1973. She graduated with a Bachelor's in Science from the United Arab Emirates University (UAEU). She started writing short stories when she was in the first year of studying biology and published her first book in Sharjah through a government-sponsored cultural project. She received her MA in Developmental biology and Tissue Culturing from the University of Arkansas in 2001. She has done and published some research on Cell Motility with both Paul Bell and Barbara Safiejko to at The University of Arkansas. In addition, she worked as a co-researcher on tissue culturing with C.F. Bailey at the Developmental Biology Lab.

Between 1996 and 2001, Al Kaabi was a teacher's assistant at the department of biology at the United Arab Emirates University. She took up the role of assistant secretary-general and the head of UNESCO department at the UAE National Commission for UNESCO. She became a news presenter at Abu Dhabi TV, presenting the local news 'Oloom Addar' and in 2009, obtained a similar position at Dubai TV. In 2008, she became media and publishing supervisor of 'Kalima', a translation project launched by the Abu Dhabi Authority for Culture and Heritage, after which she joined Khalifa University to manage the Discovery Centre in 2011. Al Kaabi joined the UNDP in 2013 as a Democratic Governance Analyst and soon became the Head of Programme Unit (United Nations Development Programme). She is both the Gender and Youth focal point at UAE Office.

Al Kaabi was the first woman to be chosen by the UAE government for the Spokesperson Empowerment Course – Managing Crisis, at the Abu Dhabi Media Company. She has been a member of Emirates Writers Union since 1997 and has founded her own publishing house "IQRAni" in 2012. She was a guest speaker at the University of Wollongong in Dubai (UOWD) during the UOWD-DBWC Women and Leadership Seminar Series in 2016.

== Works ==
- Fitting Room, 2007.
- How Did I Write the First Letter, 2011.
- No Consolation for House Cats, 2011.
- The World Speaks, 2012.
- Rabaat Alshir, 2012.
- Wajhuna Wahid, 2013.
- Gluten-Free Texts, 2019.

== Awards ==
Aisha Al Kaabi won The Emirates Women Award in Literature and Art in 2011 for her book No consolation for House cats and was invited to do a solo art exhibition at the Abu Dhabi Art Hub to mark the 43rd UAE National Day in 2014.
