= City University College of Ajman =

University in the United Arab Emirates

City University Ajman (CUA)
- Chairman: Sheikh Rashid Bin Humaid Al Nuaimi IV
- President: Imran Khan
- Vice-Chancellor: Mohamed Amerah
- Location: Ajman, Emirate of Ajman, United Arab Emirates
- Website: cuca.ae

City University Ajman (CUA) is an institution of higher education located in Ajman in the United Arab Emirates.

CUA received its license from the UAE Ministry of Higher Education and Scientific Research (MOHESR) in August 2011.

On July 17, 2024 it was reported that the university achieved a 5-star rating from QS Star system.

The University has received french accreditation and has held bootcamps to support university growth.
