= Kulthum bin Masoud =

- Born: 1957 (age 68–69); Fareej Al Hidd, Ajman
- Other name: Umm Ahmed
- Education: Kuwait University
- Occupations: Writer, poet, journalist, businesswoman
- Children: 3

Kulthum Abdullah Salem bin Masoud (Arabic: كلثم عبدالله سالم بن مسعود; 1957) is an Emirati journalist, writer, poet and businesswoman.

She is the ambassador of the United Nations Arts Organization in the UAE, and has worked as the editor-in-chief and chairperson of the International Businesswomen's Journal since 2016. Additionally, she is the head of the Emirates branch of the Arab Union for Specialized Women and is the founder and director of Dubai Ports for Culture and Creativity, and a founding member of the Emirates Women Writers Association and its Secretary. She has also held the position of Director-General of the Arab Union for Publishing and Distribution since 2017, She is an Extraordinary Ambassador for Free Culture of the Naji Al-Numan Foundation in Beirut since 2015. She won a number of awards and honors during her literary career, including the Ambassador of Happiness Sash for Leadership Happiness, the State Prize for Nabati poetry "Zayed in the Eyes of Poets" and an award Poetry Leadership Shield and many other awards and recognitions.

== Early life ==
Kulthum Abdullah was born in Fareej Al Hidd area in the emirate of Ajman in the United Arab Emirates in 1957. When she was three, her family moved to Dubai. In 1965, she joined Al Khansa’ Public School at the age of seven.

From an early age, Kulthum showed an interest in poetry and rhyme, which encouraged her to memorize poetic texts. Similarly, she had a strong command of Arabic and memorized parts of the Qur’an, mastering the grammatical structure and form of its verses. Kulthum also avidly read the pre-Islamic era poetry in her childhood, and familiarized herself with modern Arabic poetry of poets such as Nizar Qabbani, the writings of Mustafa Lutfi al-Manfaluti, as well as Nabati poetry by poets such as Ousha the Poet and Majidi Ibn Zahir.

Abdullah began writing poetry in middle school. Her first poem- written in standard Arabic- was entitled "The Heart's Humiliation" (original title: Zul Al-Fouad) was published in 1972.

She started her journey as a journalist after completing her secondary education, and she wrote for the Arab Times magazine. Then, in 1977, she joined Kuwait University as part of a delegation of twenty-three female students to study; and, she specialized in psychology.

In 1979, she returned to the UAE after graduating with a university degree and worked as a counselor at Sukaina School in Dubai.

Kulthum later moved to the Ummah School where she worked for six years. After that, she was employed at the Ministry of Education and headed the newly established Mental Health Department. She worked diligently developing it and providing psychological support and counseling services to students who suffered from challenges in their lives.

In 1991, she began working at the Women's Social Service Department, which was established by Sheikh Maktoum bin Rashid Al Maktoum and was assigned to the Ruler's Court. Thus, she resigned three years later from the Ministry of Education to devote herself to her new job, which she remained in until 2004.

Kulthum obtained a diploma in Emirati Folklore and Heritage in 2010.

== Professional and literary career ==
Kulthum Abdullah was active in the Emirati poetic circles during the early 1990s through her participation in the establishment of the Emirates Women Writers Association. She used to write the weekly inaugural national poem for the "Good Evening Emirates" radio program, which was broadcast on Abu Dhabi Radio.

Her first poetry collection was published in 1999 under the title "The Scent of the One that Left" (original title: Shatha al-Rayeh), a collection of Nabati poetry. After that, she published another poetry collection entitled “An Inscription in the Corners of Memory” (original title: Naqsh fi Zawaya al-Zakirah) in the year 2000. She also published an audiobook of poetry under the title "Tales from the Heritage of the Emirates" (original title: Hikayat min Turath al-Emarat) in 2007, followed by the publication of her fourth book, “The Features of Water” (original title: Malameh al-Ma’) in 2015. In an interview with the Egyptian Nour El-Nil channel, Kulthumd described her poems as being of a patriotic and sentimental nature.

Abdullah had a rich presence on the Emirati and Arab poetic scene. She participated in many cultural and literary events. Additionally, she founded the "Wednesday Salon" in 2002, a weekly literary salon that brought together writers, poets, journalists, playwrights, and critics of different nationalities.

She is a member of the administrative board of the Association of Poets Without Borders. Kulthum represented her country in many cultural and literary events and events that were held abroad, such as her representation of the UAE in the Jerash Festival in 1994; the Forum of Arab Poets and Writers in Doha in 1996; Al-Khansa Festival for Women Poets held in Muscat in 1999, and the first Al-Mutanabbi Festival which was held in Zürich in 2000.

She was also a member of the Emirati delegation which participated in the celebratory activities in Damascus, the capital of Arab culture in November 2008.

She was one of the poets participating in the "Poets from the Emirates" evening organized by the Mohammed bin Rashid Al Maktoum Foundation in partnership with the Dubai Culture and Arts Authority on 26 May 2014. The event, which was held in the heritage district of Al Shindagha in Dubai, included a group of Emirati female poets who read a select number of their poems. Kulthum opened the evening by reciting the poem "O Rider of the Chakra" (original title: Ya Rakib al-Chakra) which she dedicated to the rulers of the Emirates. She followed it with the poem “God Bless Those who Live in Dubai” (original title: Allah Dur Elli Sakn Feeki ya Dubai) in praise of the Emirate. This was followed by “What suits me” (original title: Ma Yaloq Lee) and the poem “Come, my most beautiful story” (original title: Ta’ala ya Ajmal Hakyi). She also participated in the second forum of the Sharjah Center for Folk Poetry, which dealt with several issues faced by Emirati female poets and their role in feminist poetry.

Kulthum has been the representative of the Austrian PEN club in the Gulf since 2014, and she is a member on the project which aims to publish the "Symphony of the Empty Quarter": a collection of Arabic poems by Emirati and Omani poets translated into German. In addition to that, they published a collection titled "The Danube Pearl", which contains German poetry translated into Arabic by Austrian poets. This initiative was put forward by Professor Ishraqa Mustafa Hamid and aims to promote interaction and human dialogue between Austria and the Arab world by translating literary works translated from and into German. Kulthum is also the UAE representative for the Institute "Drama Without Borders", based in Germany.

In terms of her career as a journalist, Kulthum wrote columns for the Emirati "Al Bayan" newspaper, in addition to a daily column, titled "Inscriptions'' (original title: Noqoush), in “Akhbar Al-Arab'' newspaper within the miscellaneous section. This latter column was very successful in the three years during which it was published. She is also a member of the Union of Arab Bloggers for the Internet.

Abdullah has also been involved in the field of business and women's empowerment for more than twenty years. She is a founding member of the Emirates Business Women Council, editor-in-chief and chairperson of the International Business Women magazine, the initiator of the project to empower craftswomen in the Arab world, and a founding member of the Emirates Club for business and liberal women. This is in addition to her participation in many business conferences at the Arab level, such as her participation in the Business and Industrial Women Conference in Syria in 2002, and the first edition of the Bahrain Business Women Conference in the same year. Abdullah also participated in the Forum of the Franco-Arab Chamber of Commerce held in Paris in 2004, and the Economic Forum of Islamic Countries held in Kuwait in 2008. She represented the Dubai Business Women Council at the Arab Women Forum held in Beirut in 2008.

In 2015, Abdullah ran for membership in the National Council of the Emirate of Dubai (candidacy number 230) under the slogan "An hour, a nursery and home time equals a happy family." Her focus was on the aspect of women's work and national service with an aim to provide women with the opportunity to work from home while taking care of their children and maintaining a happy family.

She was among one hundred Arab poets whose works were translated into Spanish within the poetic anthology compiled by the Iraqi translator and writer Nabha under the title "Contemporary Anthology of One Hundred Arab Poets- Part Two" (original title in Spanish: Antología Contemporanea de Cien Poetas Árabes, Segunda).

== Works ==
Abdullah has published four poetry collections and one audiobook:

- "The Scent of the One that Left”" (original title: Shatha Al Rayeh), 1999
- "An Inscription in the Corners of Memory" (original title: Naqsh fi Zawaya al-Zakirah), 2000
- "Tales from the Heritage of the Emirates" (original title: Hikayat min Turath al-Emarat), 2010
- "The Features of Water" (original title: Malameh al-Ma’), 2015

== Awards ==
Kulthum won a number of awards and honors during her poetic and journalistic career, the most prominent of which were:

- The Sash of the Ambassador of Loyalty and Happiness for the Delight of Leadership in 2017
- The State Prize for Nabati Poetry "Zayed in the Eyes of the Poets", 1996
- The puzzle award in Nabati poetry for three sessions
- Honorable Sheikh Mohammed bin Rashid Al Maktoum Award in the Nabati Poetry category
- She was one of the Emirati poets who were honored for matching the verses of Sheikh Mohammed bin Rashid Al Maktoum at the UAE's 35th National Day celebrations in 2006
- The Poetry Pioneering Shield Award in the thirteenth session, granted to her by Sheikh Sultan bin Muhammad Al Qasimi, Ruler of the Emirate of Sharjah, 2016
- Certificate of Merit from Abu Dhabi University, UAE
- Honorary award from the Arab Association for Human and Environmental Development
- A certificate of appreciation presented by the Emirates Club to Business and Self-Employed Women for their efforts in making the club's second Ramadan conference a success, 2016
- A certificate of thanks and appreciation from the Arab Union for Investment and Real Estate Development in October 2017
- A certificate of appreciation in the first session of the Arab Conference on Combating Electronic Addiction, which was held in Egypt during October 2018
- A certificate of thanks and appreciation from the Gulf Society of Sociologists and the Bahrain Sociologists Society in November 2018
- A certificate of appreciation presented by the Arab Women Investors Union in its 2019 session
- Certificate of Appreciation from the Jordanian Etaam Organization for Development and Training in April 2019
- A certificate of appreciation from the Department of Culture at Al-Hirah Literary Council for its participation in the Emirati Women's Day celebration in the "Emirati Creative Experiences Abroad" session, on 29 August 2019

== Personal life ==
She married in 1982, has three children, and lives in Dubai. Those close to her nickname her "Umm Ahmed".

Kulthum owns an advertising design and production office, in addition to being the editor-in-chief and board chair of the International Business Women magazine. She loves to listen to traditional music, especially the tunes played on the rabab and the flute.
