= Postage stamps and postal history of Abu Dhabi =

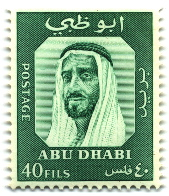
Sheikh Zayed, 1967

Now part of the United Arab Emirates, Abu Dhabi was formerly the largest of the seven sheikdoms which made up the Trucial States on the Pirate Coast of eastern Arabia between Oman and Qatar. The Trucial States as a whole had an area of some 32,000 square miles (83,000 km^{2}) of which Abu Dhabi alone had 26,000 (67,000 km^{2}). The capital was the town of Abu Dhabi which is on an offshore island and was first settled in 1761.

== Background ==
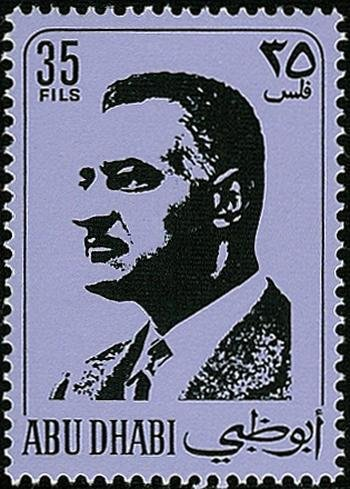
President Gamal Abdel Nasser, 1971

The name Trucial States arose from treaties made with Great Britain in 1820 which ensured a condition of truce in the area and the suppression of piracy and slavery. The treaty expired on 31 December 1966. The decision to form the UAE was made on 18 July 1971 and the federation was founded on 1 August 1972, although the inaugural UAE postage stamps were not issued until 1 January 1973.

== Postal services ==
In December 1960, postage stamps of British postal agencies in Eastern Arabia were supplied to the construction workers on Das Island but the postal service was administered via the agency office in Bahrain. The mail was also postmarked Bahrain so there was no clear indication that a letter had come from Das Island.

On 30 March 1963, a British agency was opened in Abu Dhabi and issued the agency stamps after the sheikh objected to the use of the Trucial States definitives. Mail from Das Island continued to be administered by Bahrain but was now cancelled by an Abu Dhabi Trucial States postmark.

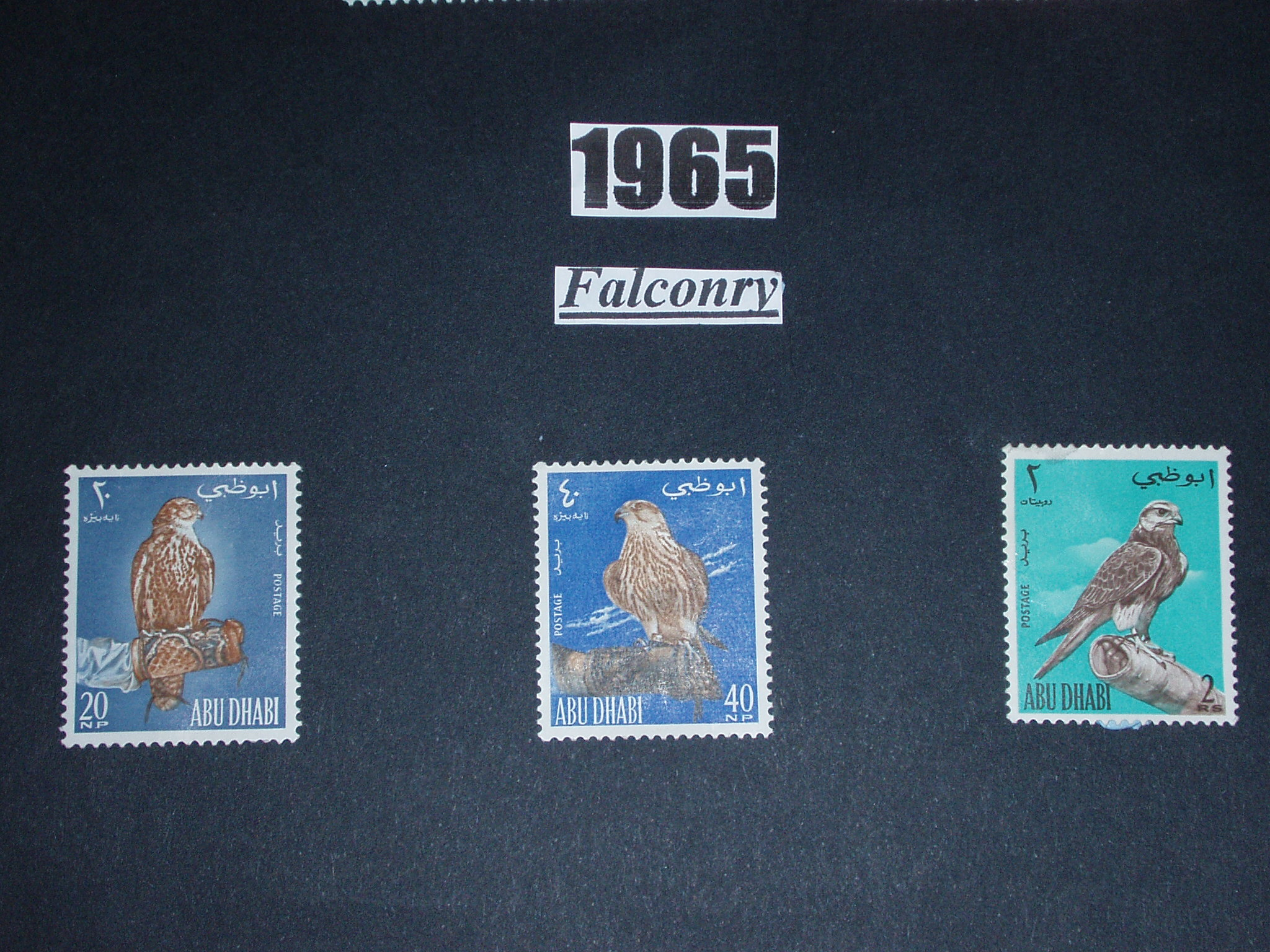
1965 falconry stamps

The first Abu Dhabi stamps were a definitive series of 30 March 1964 depicting Sheikh Shakhbout bin Zayed Al Nahyan. There were eleven values under the Indian currency that was used of 100 naye paise = 1 rupee. The range of values was 5 np to 10 rupees.

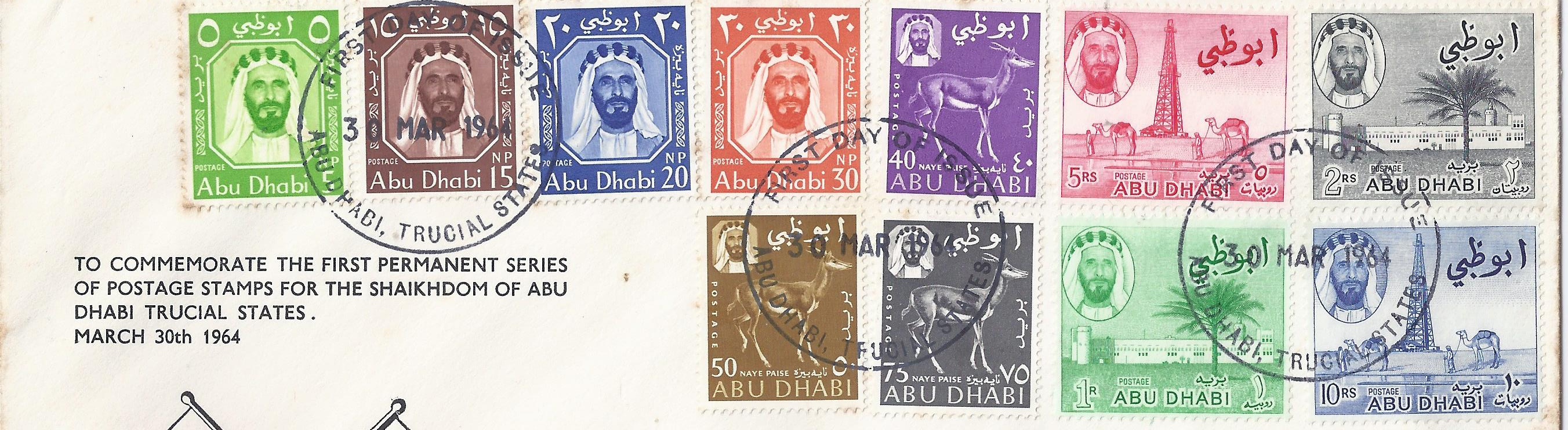
The first stamps of Abu Dhabi issued in 1964 depicting the Ruler at the time, Sheikh Shakhbout bin Zayed Al Nahyan

Despite the introduction of these definitives, the British agency stamps remained valid in both Abu Dhabi and Das Island until the end of 1966 when they were withdrawn.

A post office was opened on Das Island on 6 January 1966 and this ended the Bahrain service. Mail from Das Island was now handled within Abu Dhabi.

When the treaty with Great Britain expired at the end of 1966, Abu Dhabi introduced a new currency of 1000 fils = 1 dinar and took over its own postal administration, including the Das Island office. The earlier issues were subject to surcharges in this currency and replacement definitives were released depicting the new ruler, Sheikh Zayed bin Sultan Al Nahyan. Issues continued until the introduction of UAE stamps in 1973.

In all, Abu Dhabi issued 95 stamps from 1964 to 1972, the final set being three views of the Dome of the Rock in Jerusalem.

== See also ==
- Postage stamps and postal history of Sharjah
- Postage stamps and postal history of the United Arab Emirates
- Revenue stamps of the United Arab Emirates
