= Skyports Infrastructure =

- Type: Division
- Industry: Advanced air mobility
- Founded: 2018
- Founder: Duncan Walker
- Headquarters: London, England
- Parent: Skyports Limited

Skyports Infrastructure is a British company that designs, builds and operates vertiports for electric vertical take-off and landing (eVTOL) aircraft. It is the infrastructure business of Skyports, an advanced air mobility company founded in 2018 and based in London.

The company has been appointed by the government of Jeju Province as lead developer and operator of South Korea's first commercial vertiport network on Jeju Island, developed the Dubai International Vertiport (DXV), the first commercial vertiport in the United Arab Emirates to receive technical design approval, operates New York City's Downtown Manhattan Heliport through the Downtown Skyport joint venture, and is building the UK's first vertiport testbed at Bicester Motion as part of the UKRI-funded Air Mobility Ecosystem Consortium.

== History ==
Skyports Limited was founded in 2018 by Duncan Walker to develop ground infrastructure for eVTOL aircraft and drones. The company initially demonstrated a prototype vertiport at Marina Bay in Singapore in 2019 as part of an urban air mobility showcase with Volocopter.

Skyports later separated its activities into Skyports Drone Services, which provides drone-based logistics, and Skyports Infrastructure, which focuses on vertiport development and operations.

== Operations ==
Skyports Infrastructure identifies and secures sites, designs layouts, and operates vertiports for passenger and cargo eVTOL services. According to industry coverage, the division has formed partnerships with several aircraft manufacturers and airport authorities and has offices or project teams active in Europe, the Middle East, Asia and North America.

== Major projects ==
=== Jeju Island vertiport network ===
In September 2025 Skyports Infrastructure was appointed by the government of Jeju Province as lead developer and operator for what is described as South Korea's first commercial vertiport network on Jeju Island.

Under a memorandum of understanding, Skyports is responsible for planning and building the vertiports, securing investment and managing operations, while Jeju supports permitting and designation of demonstration zones. Initial proposed locations include Jeju International Airport, Jungmun and Seongsan, with further sites planned for future expansion.

=== Dubai International Vertiport ===
Skyports has been involved in developing a vertiport network in Dubai to support Joby Aviation's planned air taxi services. In January 2025 the Dubai International Vertiport (DXV), located adjacent to Dubai International Airport, became the first commercial vertiport facility in the United Arab Emirates to receive technical design approval from the General Civil Aviation Authority.

Industry publications report that DXV is intended as one of several initial vertiports in a Dubai air taxi network planned to begin commercial operations in the second half of the decade.

=== Downtown Skyport (New York City) ===
In December 2024 the New York City Economic Development Corporation (NYCEDC) announced that a joint venture named Downtown Skyport, composed of Skyports Infrastructure and French airport group Groupe ADP, had been selected as the new operator of the city-owned Downtown Manhattan Heliport after a competitive request for proposals.

NYCEDC stated that the contract includes upgrading the heliport to support eVTOL aircraft and last-mile maritime freight as part of a broader plan to turn the site into a multi-modal, low-emission transport hub. Coverage in the New York Post highlighted political debate around the choice of a foreign-owned consortium and reported that the concession is valued at about US$14.7 million over five years, with options to extend.

=== Bicester Motion vertiport testbed ===
Skyports Infrastructure is one of the partners in the Air Mobility Ecosystem Consortium, a group of UK companies and organisations that received funding of about £9.25 million from the UK Research and Innovation's "Future Flight Challenge" to demonstrate advanced air mobility services.

As part of the project, Skyports has developed a vertiport at the Bicester Motion site in Oxfordshire, described by the consortium and UK media as a "living lab" and the UK's first vertiport testbed. The facility is intended to support demonstration flights by Vertical Aerospace's VX4 prototype and to test passenger processing, ground automation, charging and airspace integration concepts.
