= Manama, Ajman =

Al Manama المنامة
- Location within United Arab Emirates
- Coordinates: 25°19′49″N 56°1′40″E
- Country: United Arab Emirates
- Emirate: Ajman

Area
  - Total: 25.73 km^{2} (9.93 sq mi)
- Elevation: 233 m (764 ft)

Population
  - Total: 5,823
  - Density: 226.3/km^{2} (586/sq mi)

Al Manama is a township in the United Arab Emirates (UAE), one of two exclaves of the Emirate of Ajman (the other is Masfout). Its land area is mainly given over to agricultural usage. It is known to stamp collectors as a number of editions of colourful stamps were issued from there in the late 1960s.

At the census of 2017 the city had a population 5,823 on an area of 25.73 km^{2}, which corresponds to a population density of 226.3 per km^{2}.

== History ==
Manama was, at the turn of the 20th century, a village of seven or eight houses of the Sharqiyin tribe. It grew in importance when, following the crash of the pearling industry in the late 1920s, the Ruler of Ajman, Sheikh Rashid Al Nuaimi, identified Manama as an area with the potential to be developed as Ajman's 'bread basket' and invested in planting a number of crops, including papaya and lemon trees. Manama was also the source of two particularly fine varieties of wild honey with sidr and simr trees providing two seasonal flows of honey from wild Asiatic honey bees. The gathering of honey was also formalised, this and the growing agricultural base in Manama providing work for the impoverished men of coastal Ajman into the 1930s.

== Philately ==
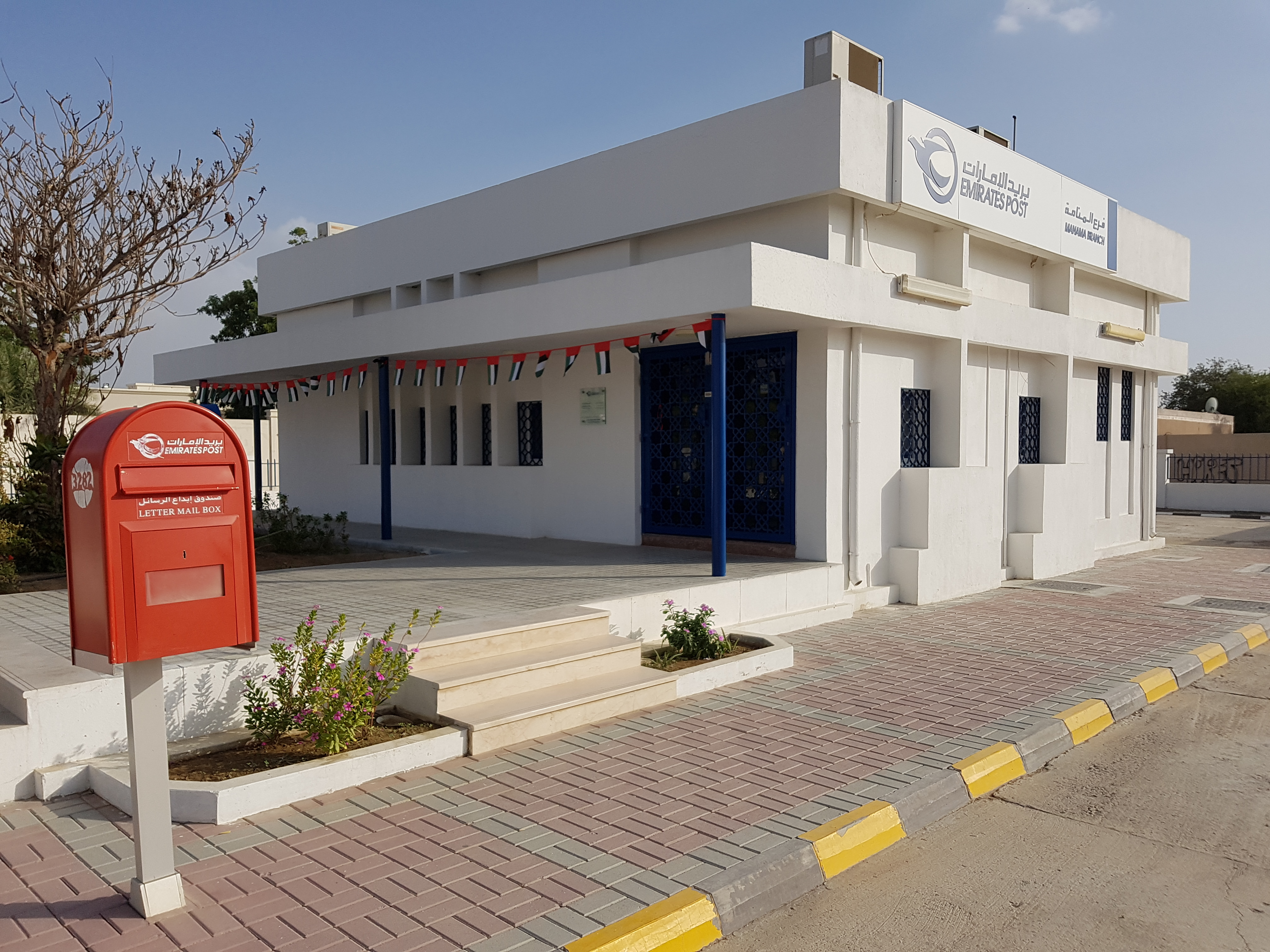
Manama Post Office, today a branch of Emirates Post, originally issued huge editions of stamps in the 1960s.

In 1963, Britain ceded responsibility for the Trucial States' postal systems. An American philatelic entrepreneur, Finbar Kenny, saw the opportunity to create a number of editions of stamps aimed at the lucrative collector's market and in 1964 concluded a deal with cash-strapped Ajman to take the franchise for the production of stamps for the government. Kenny had made something of a specialty out of signing these deals, also signing with the Ruler of Fujairah in 1964 – and getting involved in a bribery case in the USA over his dealings with the government of the Cook Islands.

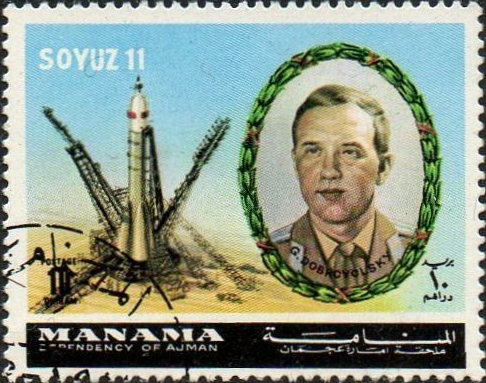
Stamp issued in the name of Manama in 1972

These stamps, colourfully illustrated and unrelated to the actual emirate of Ajman (editions included 'Space Research' and 'Tokyo Olympic Games') became known together with stamps produced by other Trucial States at the time, as 'dunes'. Their proliferation eventually devalued them. Among these editions, following the opening of a post office in Manama on July 5, 1966, were nine editions published from 'Manama, Dependency of Ajman'.
