= Ajman =

Capital of the Emirate of Ajman, United Arab Emirates

Ajman عجمان
- City
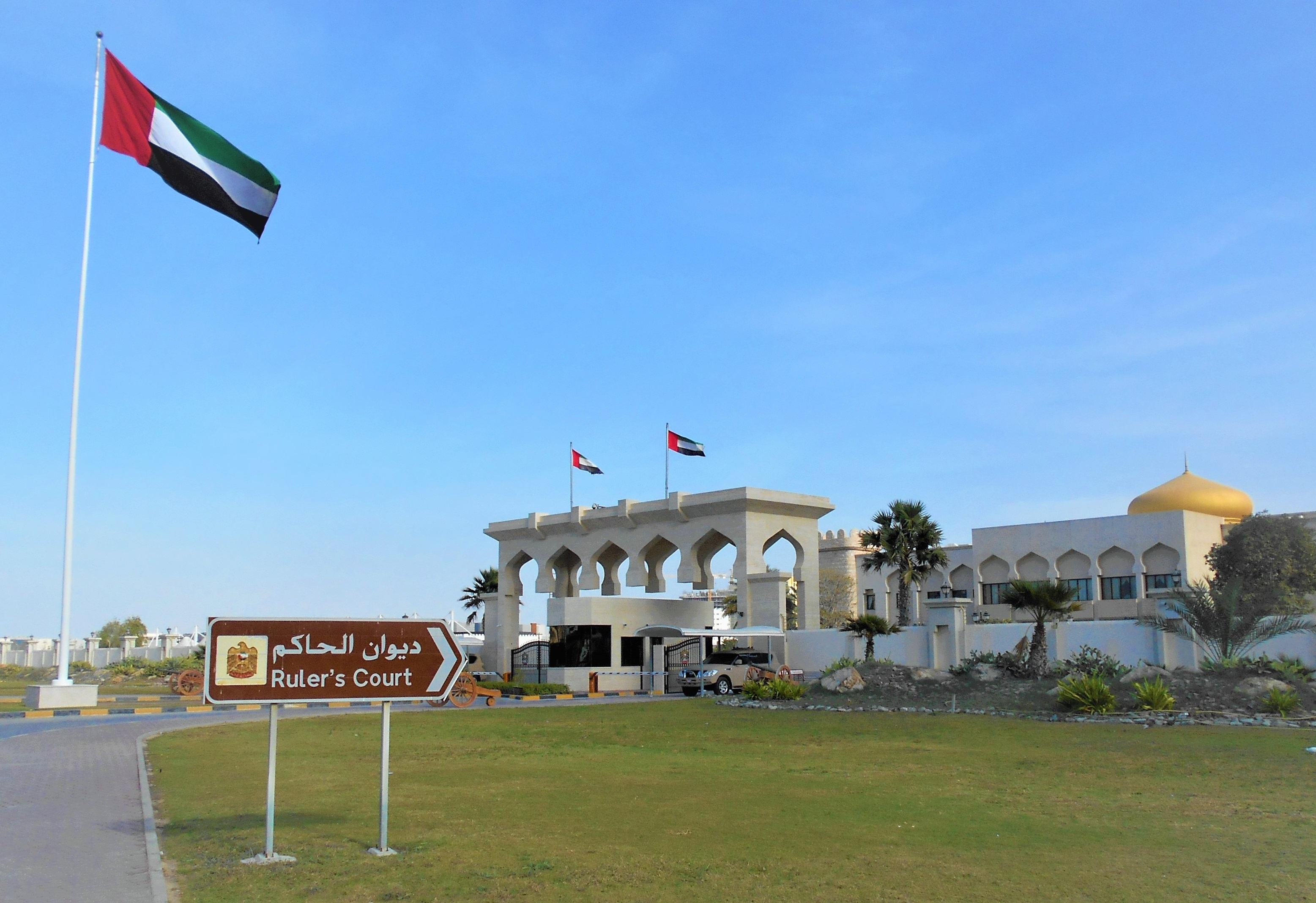
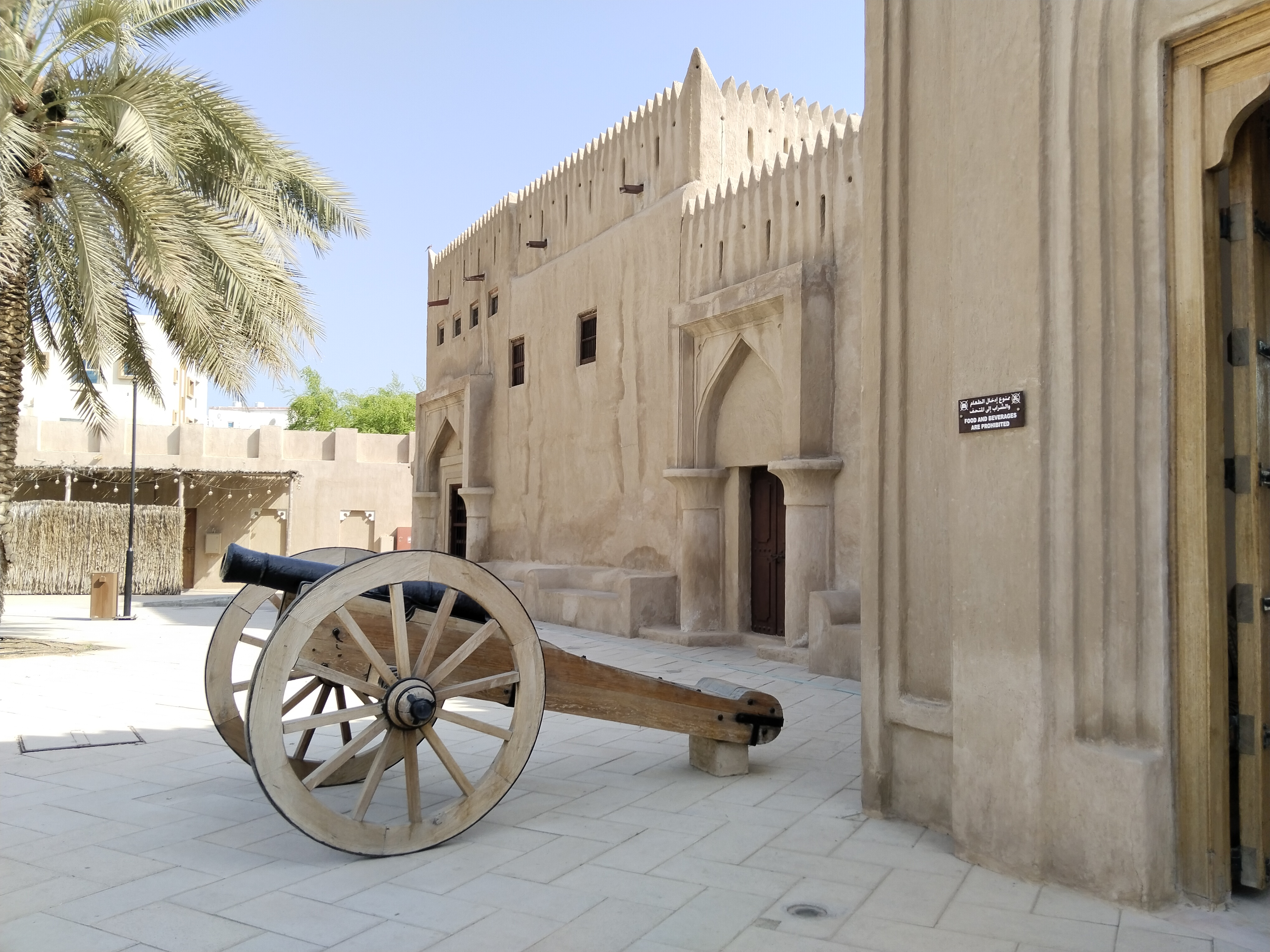
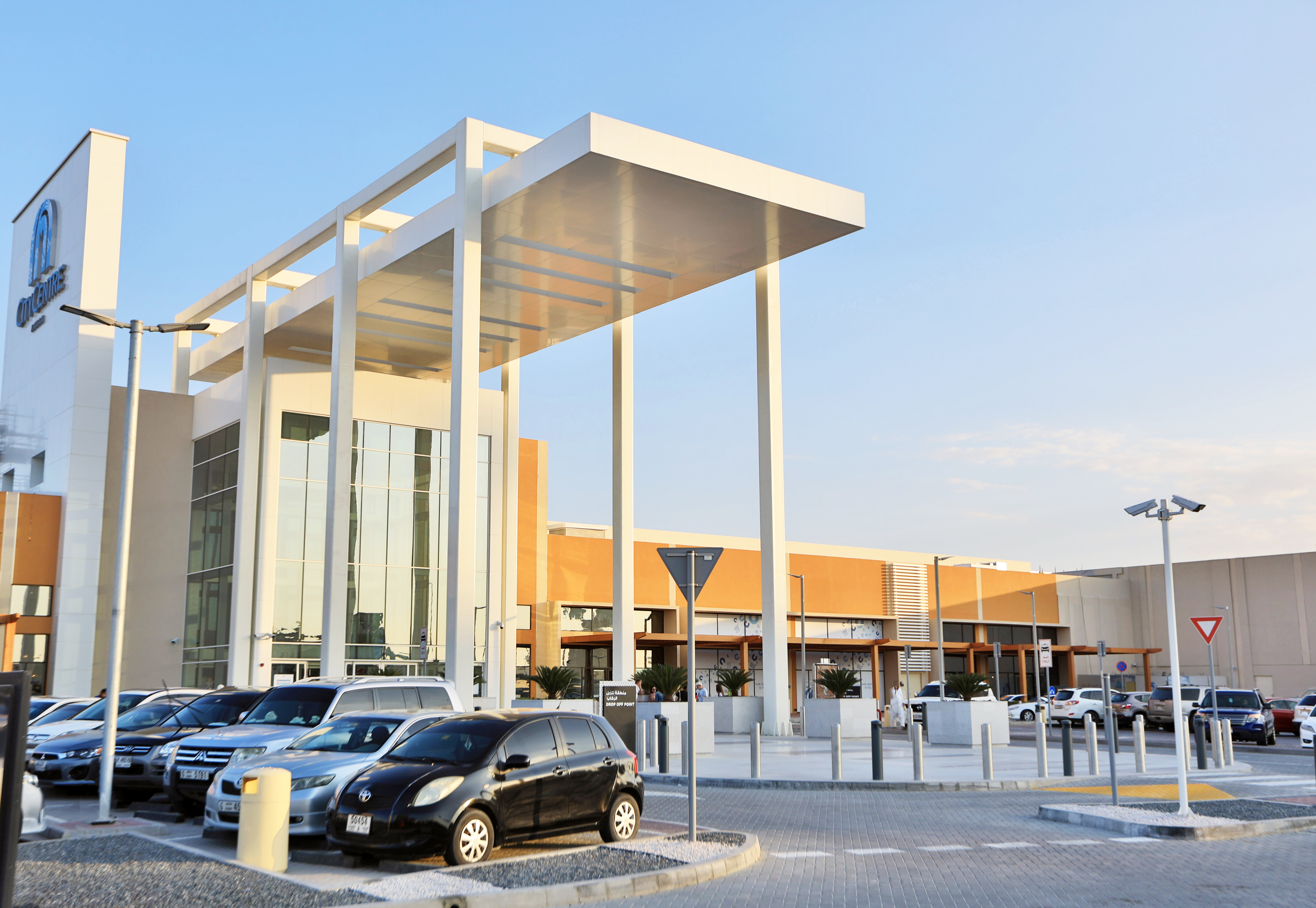
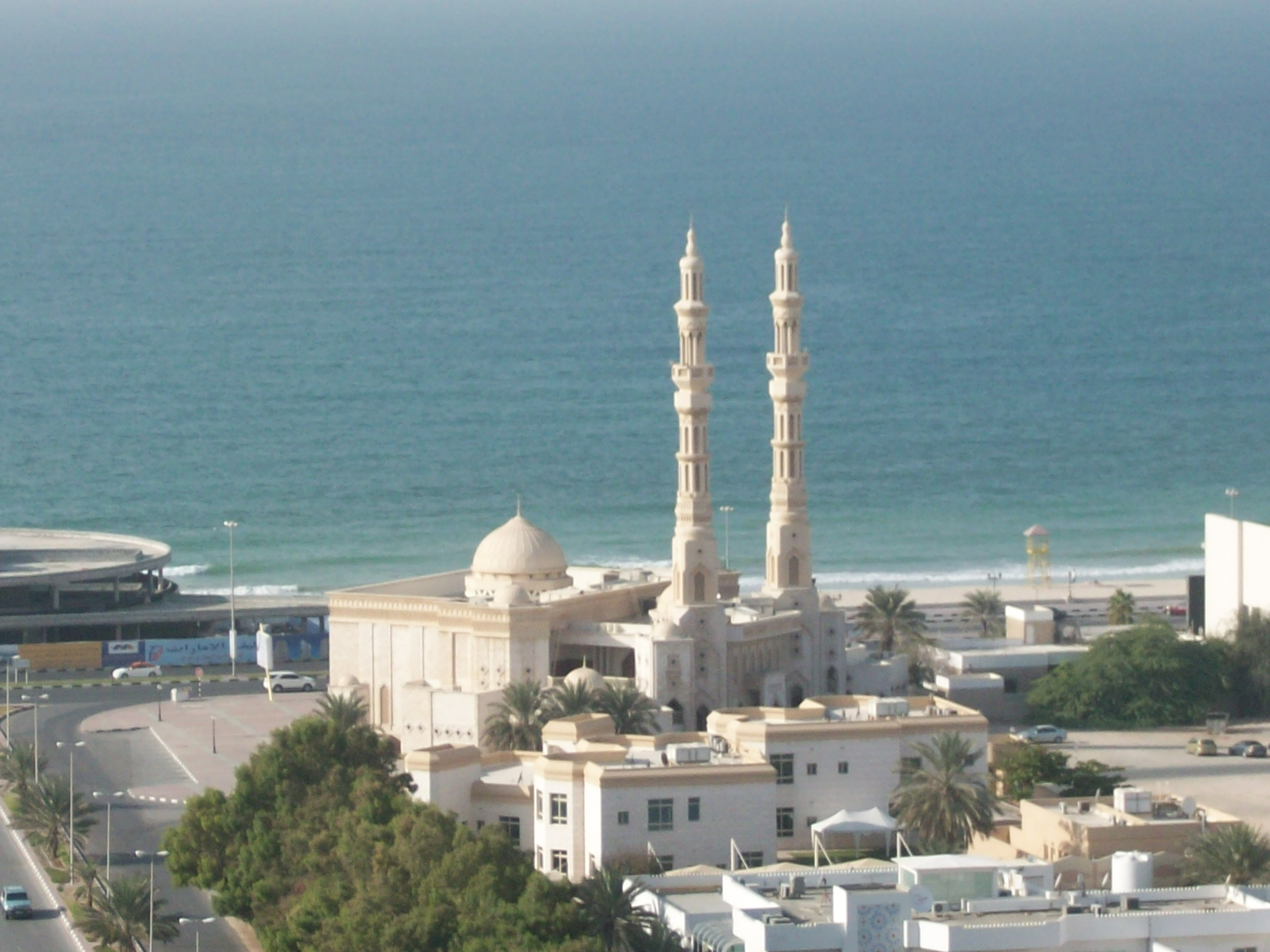
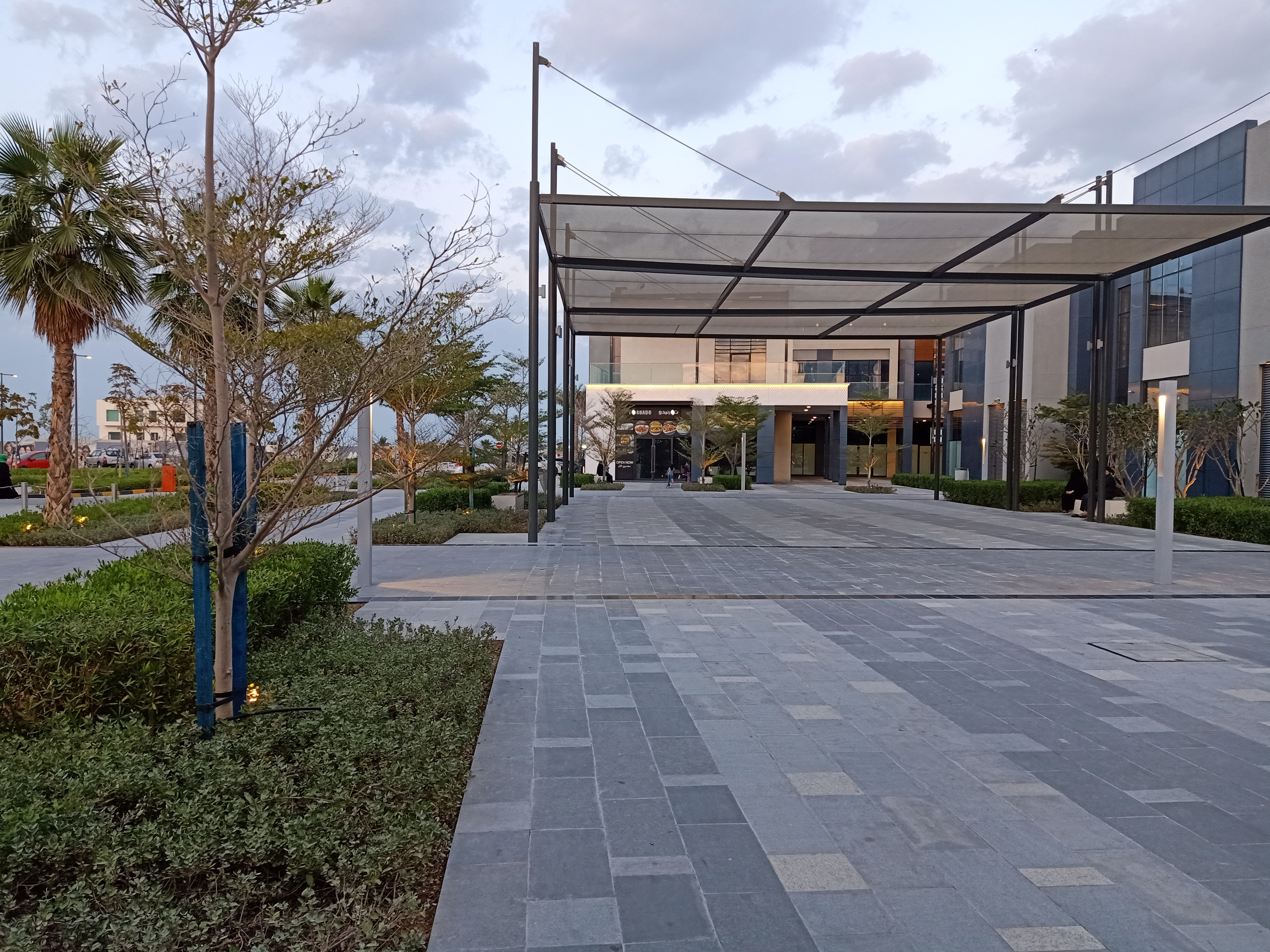
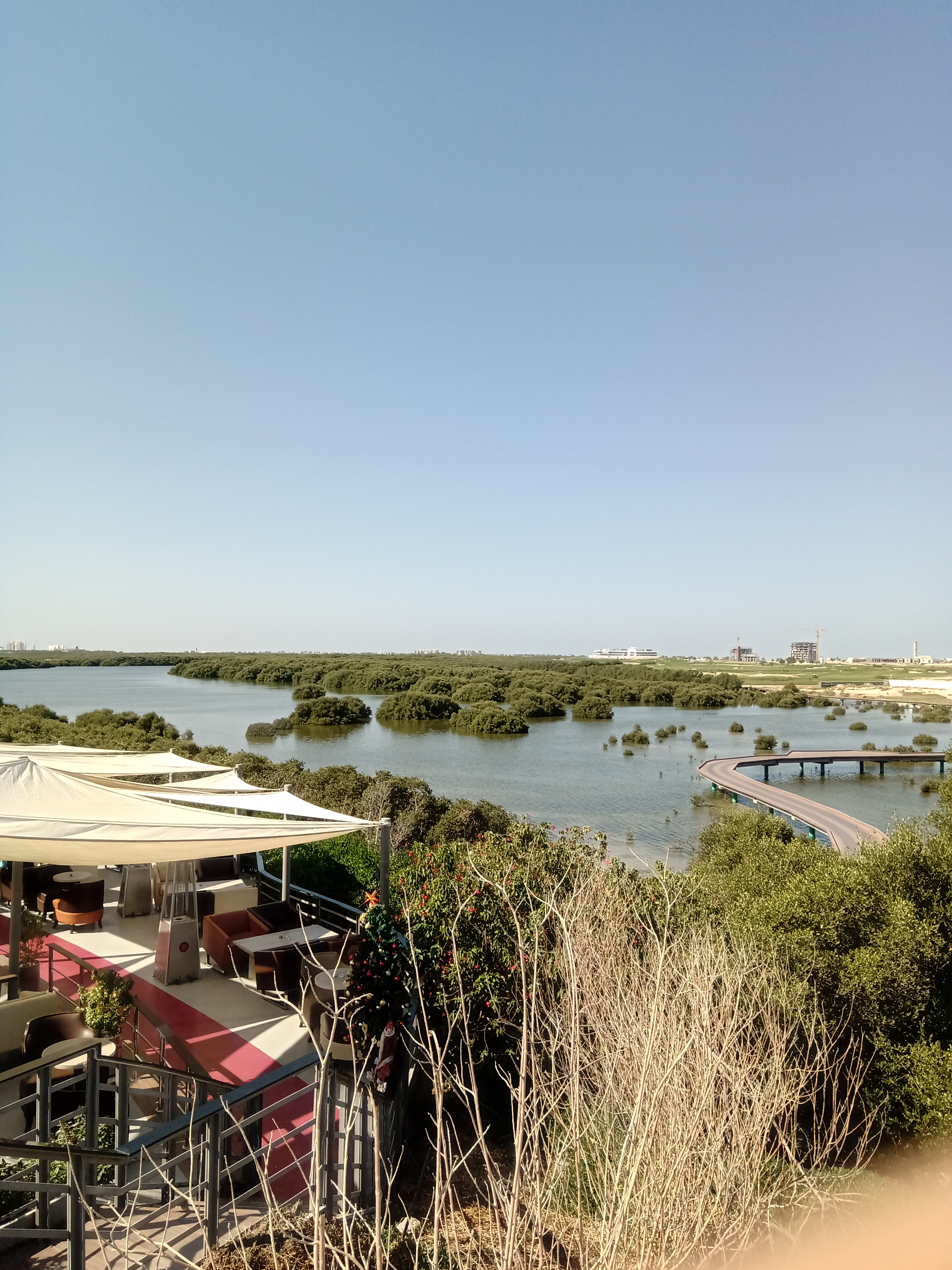
- Ruler's Court Ajman Museum City Centre Ajman Ajman Corniche Mosque Marsa Ajman Al Zorah

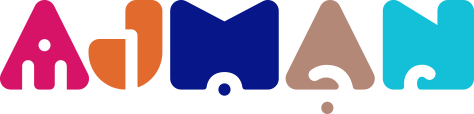
- Flag Coat of arms Wordmark

- Location of Ajman in the UAE Location within the Persian Gulf
- Coordinates: 25°24′49″N 55°26′44″E
- Country: United Arab Emirates
- Emirate: Ajman
- Founded: 1750

Government
  - Type: Absolute monarchy
  - Sheikh: Humaid bin Rashid Al Nuaimi III

Area
  - Land: 148 km^{2} (57 sq mi)

Population (2024)
  - Total: 565,767

GDP
  - Total: US$ 9.3 billion (2023)
  - Per capita: US$ 22,600 (2023)
- Time zone: UTC+4 (UAE Standard Time)
- Website: ajman.ae

Ajman (Arabic: عجمان 'Aǧmān; Gulf Arabic: عيمان ʿYmān) is the fifth-most populous city in the United Arab Emirates, after Dubai, Abu Dhabi, Sharjah, and Al Ain. It is the capital of the Emirate of Ajman and forms part of the Dubai–Sharjah–Ajman metropolitan area. It is bounded by the Persian Gulf to the west and surrounded by the Emirate of Sharjah on land.

== Etymology ==
The word Ajman comes from Arabic عَجْمان (ʕajmān), related to عَجَم (ʕajam, “foreigner”), because the area was at one time inhabited by Persians.

== History ==
Al Bu Kharaiban Nuaimi rule in Ajman started in 1816, when Sheikh Rashid bin Humaid Al Nuaimi and fifty of his followers took the coastal settlement of Ajman from members of the Al Bu Shamis Nuaimi tribe in a short conflict. It wasn't until 1816 or 1817, however, that the Ajman fort finally fell to Rashid's followers and his rule was endorsed by the powerful Sheikh of neighbouring Sharjah and Ras Al Khaimah, Sheikh Sultan bin Saqr Al Qasimi.

On 8 January 1820, following the sack of Ras Al Khaimah by a British force led by Major-General William Grant Keir, Sultan bin Saqr signed the General Maritime Treaty with the United Kingdom on 4 February 1820, followed on 15 March by Rashid bin Humaid at Falaya Fort.

An 1822 British maritime survey noted that Ajman had one of the best backwaters on the coast and was a small town with a single fortified building, the ruler's house. In common with many other coastal towns on what became the Trucial Coast, the population was mobile depending on the season – there were as many as 1,400 to 1,700 men of the 'Mahamee' tribe living there during the pearl hunting season (April–September), many of whom would migrate to Al Buraimi in the date season. The survey notes that Ajman's ruler Rashid bin Ahmed considered his dominion independent of the Emirate of Sharjah, but that Sharjah did not maintain that view even though it had no power over Ajman. The survey noted that the inhabitants of Ajman were 'mostly strict Wahhabis' and recorded the presence of the ruined village of Fasht down the shore from Ajman town, which is today the Fisht suburb of Sharjah city.

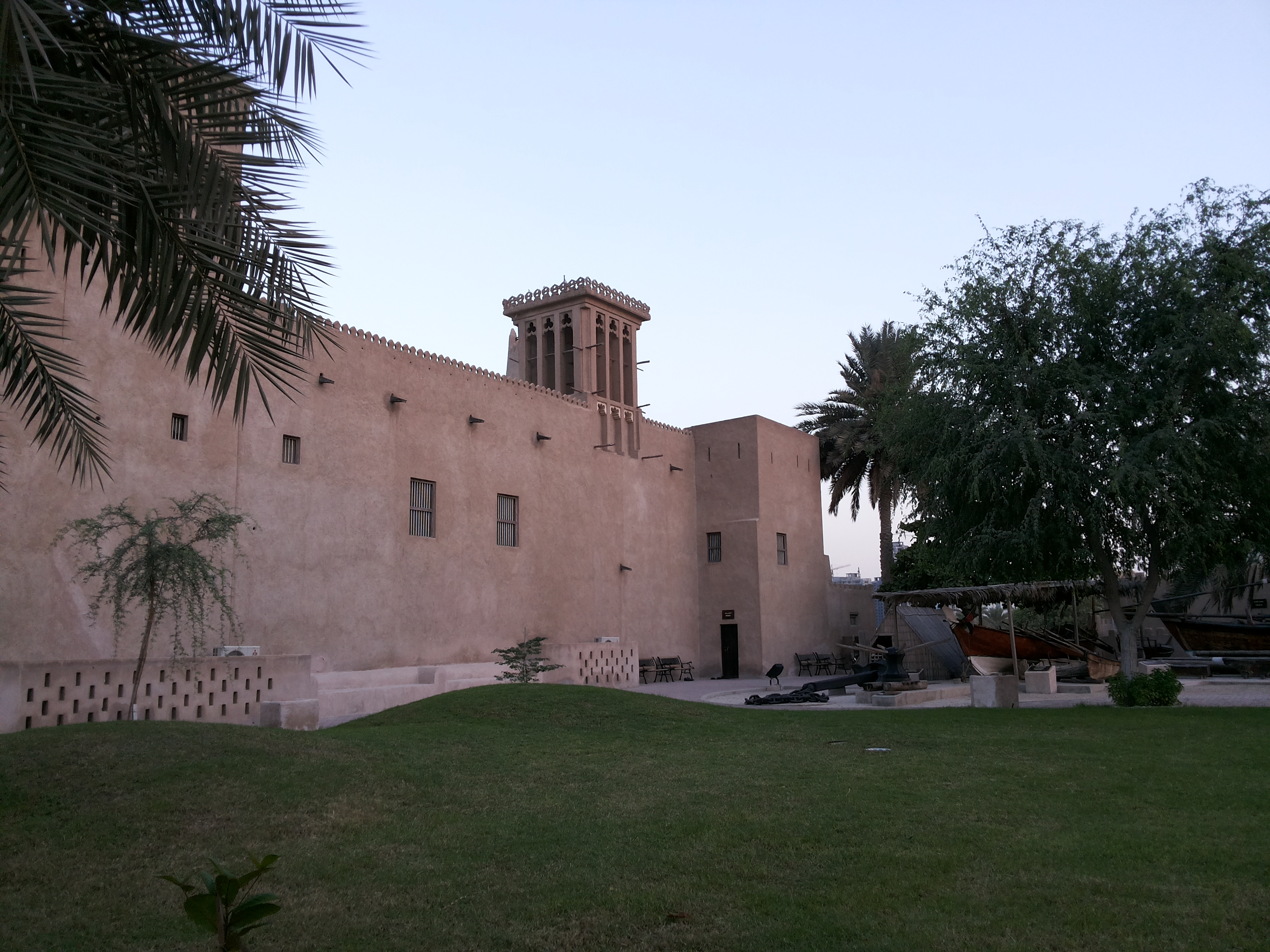
Ajman Fort, today a museum

In 1831, the Sheikh of Ajman accepted a subsidy from the Imam of Muscat to join with Sultan bin Saqr of Sharjah against Sohar, but following Sultan's defeat declared for Sohar. In his absence, a part of Bani Yas from Abu Dhabi sacked Ajman town and its date groves. In retaliation, the forces of Ajman committed 'daring depredations' upon the cities of Sohar and Muscat. When called upon to provide redress for the actions of his 'subject', Sultan bin Saqr disavowed any authority over Ajman and in 1832 a British naval force was sent to Ajman to obtain redress for the raids on the East Coast cities. Ending a conflict between Sharjah, Ajman and Dubai on the one hand and Abu Dhabi on the other, Ajman (together with the other parties) signed the 1835 Maritime Treaty in its own right.

In 1840, Humaid bin Obeid bin Subt of Al Heera invaded Ajman supported by a body of the Bani Naeem. Although initially reluctant to assist Humeid bin Rashid, Sultan bin Suggur of Sharjah sent his son Suggur who, together with Maktoum of Dubai, ejected the invaders and sacked Al Heera in reprisal.

In 1843 a further Maritime Treaty was signed between the Trucial Sheikhs and the British and then, on 4 May 1853, 'A Perpetual Treaty of Peace' was entered into by the coastal Sheikhs, including Ajman. A copy of this treaty is on display in Ajman Museum. A further treaty of 1892 bound the Trucial States to Britain.

By the 20th century, J. G. Lorimer's survey of the coast of the Trucial States showed Ajman to be a small town of some 750 inhabitants (in comparison, the population of Dubai at the time numbered over 10,000). On 2 December 1971, Ajman, under Sheikh Rashid bin Humayd Al Nuaimi, joined the United Arab Emirates.

== Population ==
The city has more than 90% of the population of the emirate. The area runs directly into the city of Sharjah along the coast to the southwest, which in turn is adjacent to Dubai, forming a continuous urban area. The Emirate of Ajman's population in 2024 is estimated at 582,852, and Ajman city's is estimated at 565,767, reflecting a significant growth trajectory over the decades. Back in 1950, the population was only 231, highlighting the rapid urbanization and development of the emirate.

== Economy ==
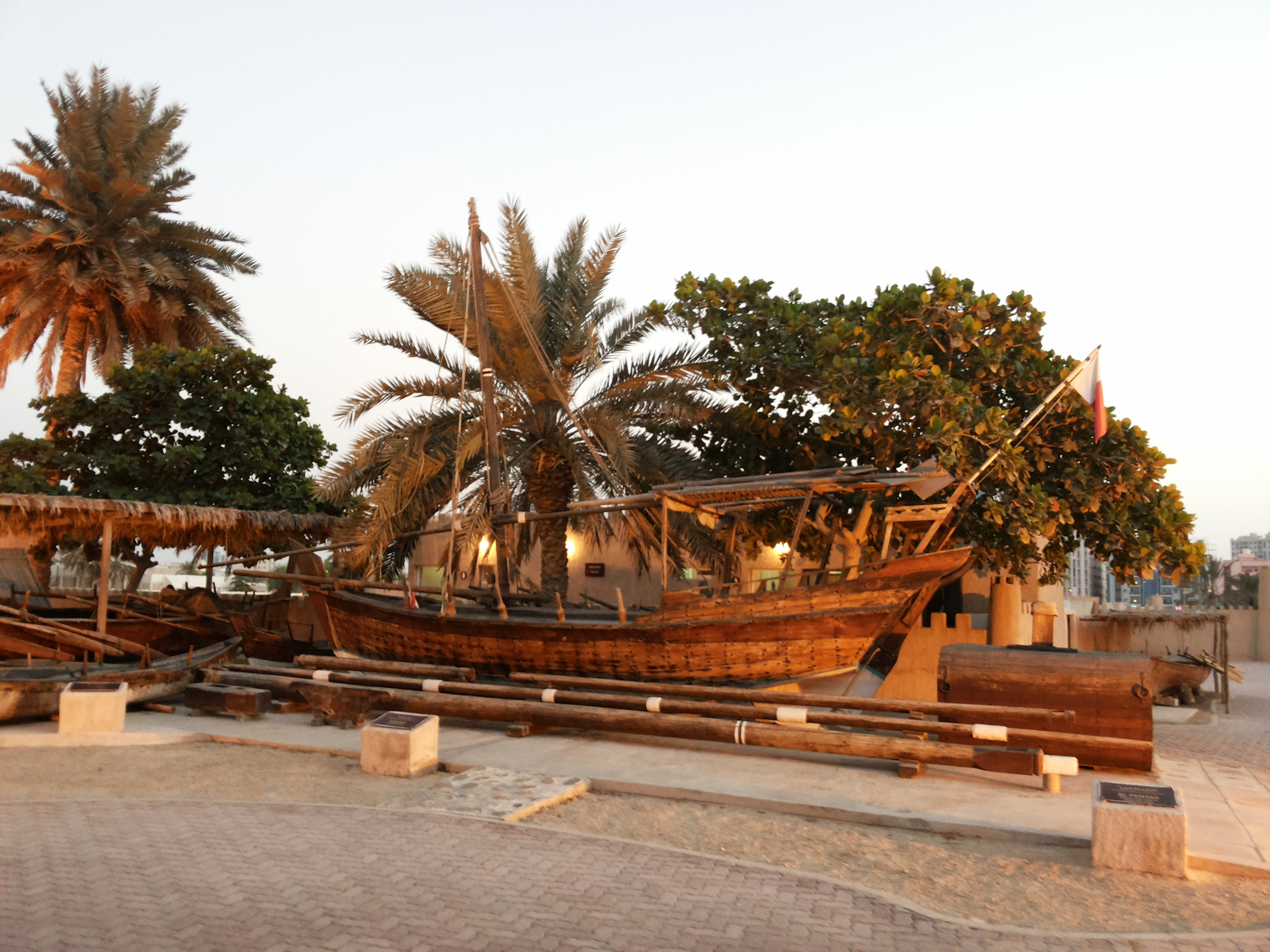
Dhow

Historically Ajman's economy was mostly based on Fishing, Pearl Diving, Dhow building, and Agriculture, the emirate has fertile agricultural land in Al Manama and in Masfout. In the recent years Ajman has diversified its economy, as of 2026, Real Estate, Industry, and Tourism sectors have seen significant growth.

Ajman recently expanded their beachfront from 55,000 square meters to 220,000 square meters, and have added a 2.5 km cycling track. As part of Ajman Vision 2030.

=== Real Estate ===
The Real Estate sector in Ajman is growing fast, during 2025, several residential and commercial projects were announced, such as Tiger Downtown Ajman, a project worth $10 billion. And a Four Seasons resort.

During 2025, Ajman recorded real estate transactions worth 28 billion, 37% higher than 2024.

During Q1 of 2026, Ajman recorded real estate transactions worth 6.22 billion, 12% higher than Q1 of 2025.

=== Free Zones ===
Ajman has several free zones, free zones in Ajman are managed by Free Zones Authority (FZA).

- Ajman Free Zone (AFZ): Ajman Free Zone is the first free zone established in Ajman in 1988, the free zone is home to more than 9,000 companies comprising entrepreneurs and investors from over 145 countries.
- Ajman NuVentures Centre Free Zone (ANCFZ): Launched in October 2024, it is a fully digital free zone, that specializes in providing ultra-fast services, such as License in 2 hours and Visa in 24 hours, within the first year more than 6,500 companies were registered.
- Ajman Media City (AMC).

== Tourism ==
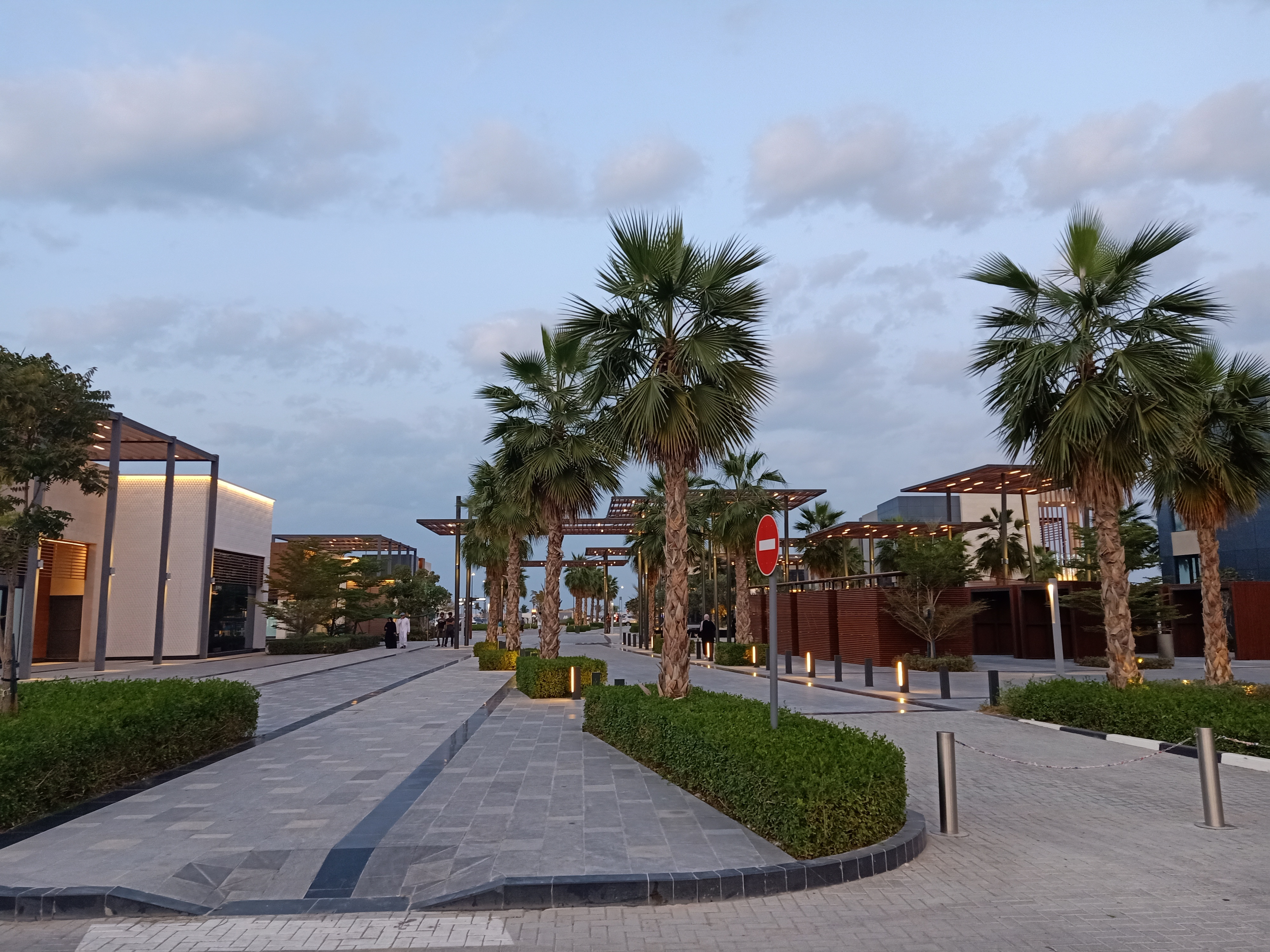
Marsa Ajman

Ajman's Department of Tourism, Culture, and Media is continuing to develop the tourism sector in the Emirate of Ajman. The tourism sector has immensely grown throughout the years, with recent investments from foreign companies and installations and renovations of its tourist attractions, hotels and commercial sites. And as part of Ajman Vision 2030, Ajman aims to position itself as a dynamic cultural and tourism hub. Tourist attractions in the emirate are growing rapidly. They include:

- Ajman Beach.
- Souk Saleh, a historic market build in the 1950s.
- Marsa Ajman, is a waterfront in Ajman, features a variety of restaurants and cafés.
- Ajman Museum situated at Ajman Fort.
- The Red Fort and the museum in the inland enclave of Al Manama.
- Al Zorah Nature Reserve and Mangroves.
- Al Zorah Golf Club
- Masfout Museum, An archaeological showcase in the inland enclave of Masfout, tracing 5,000 years of history from prehistoric times until the formation of the UAE.
- Masfout Oasis
- Equestrian Club, a relaxed horse-riding centre with a range of classes.
- Al Tallah Camel Racecourse.
- City Centre Ajman, the Emirate’s biggest mall, is a big attraction as well for its unique architectural experience and variety of shops and confectionaries.
- Ajman's corniche is a popular evening and weekend destination for families and features a number of fast food outlets, coffee shops and stalls. It is also home to a number of hotels.

Ajman's newly developed Al Zorah area supports a range of outdoor activities, including golf, children's play areas and kayaking.

In 2025 Masfout was named the (Best Tourist Village in the World) by UN.

Ajman is ranked the second safest city in the world, according to a report by numbeo.com for the year 2025. Abu Dhabi was ranked first, while Sharjah and Dubai are in the third and fifth spots, respectively.

== Transportation ==
The Ajman Transport Authority (ATA), is the regulatory and operational body responsible for planning, regulating, and developing the transport sector in the emirate.

=== Bus ===
ATA operates both internal (within Emirate) and inter‑emirate (between emirates) bus services.

Internally, the fleet is modest (dozens of buses), and coverage includes main corridors such as Al Ittihad Street, Al Jurf, and the industrial areas.

Inter‑emirate routes connects Ajman with Dubai, Sharjah, Ras Al Khaimah, and Al Ain.

Ridership has been increasing: in H1 2025, over 1.9 million passenger trips were recorded, across ~116,297 bus trips.

The number of bus stops in Ajman has grown from 73 in 2020 to 95 by end of 2023.

In 2024, Ajman released an upgraded public transport map showing expanded routes, including marine transport routes and on‑demand bus services to enhance accessibility.

=== Taxi ===
Taxi services in Ajman are regulated by the ATA.

In October 2024, Ajman announced that its entire taxi fleet had been converted to eco‑friendly vehicles.

The number of recorded taxi trips is rising: in the first half of 2024, ~6.4 million trips were made, marking a 23% increase over the same period in 2023.

There are also specialized taxi services such as women‑only taxis and free taxis for People Of Determination (POD), people with special‑needs.

=== Marine / Water Transport ===
Ajman offers marine passenger transport via abras (traditional wooden boats) along the coastline. Stations are located at Ajman Fish Market, Al Rashidiya, Al Zorah, Musherief, and Safia.

Large abras hold up to 25 passengers; smaller ones about 15.

=== Ports & Maritime Freight ===
Ajman Port features a ~1,250 m quay and handles break‑bulk and roll-on/roll-off (RoRo) traffic.

Under the Ajman Vision 2030 plan, a new maritime port is planned at the Al Zorah district to expand container handling capacity and accommodate larger vessels.

=== Air ===
Ajman has no dedicated airport; nearest airports are, Sharjah International Airport (SHJ) and Dubai International Airport (DXB).

In 2025 Ajman's Transport Authority signed a Memorandum of Understanding (MoU) with Skyports Infrastructure to collaborate on smart aerial transport infrastructure development such as air taxi.

== Education ==
There are several public and private schools in addition to universities in Ajman. The public schools are run by the Ministry of Education. While private schools in the emirate are regulated by Private Education Affairs Office (PEO).

- List of Universities in Ajman
  - Ajman University, founded in 1988
  - City University College of Ajman (CUCA)
  - Gulf Medical University

Ajman joined the UNESCO Global Network of Learning Cities in 2024.

== Healthcare ==
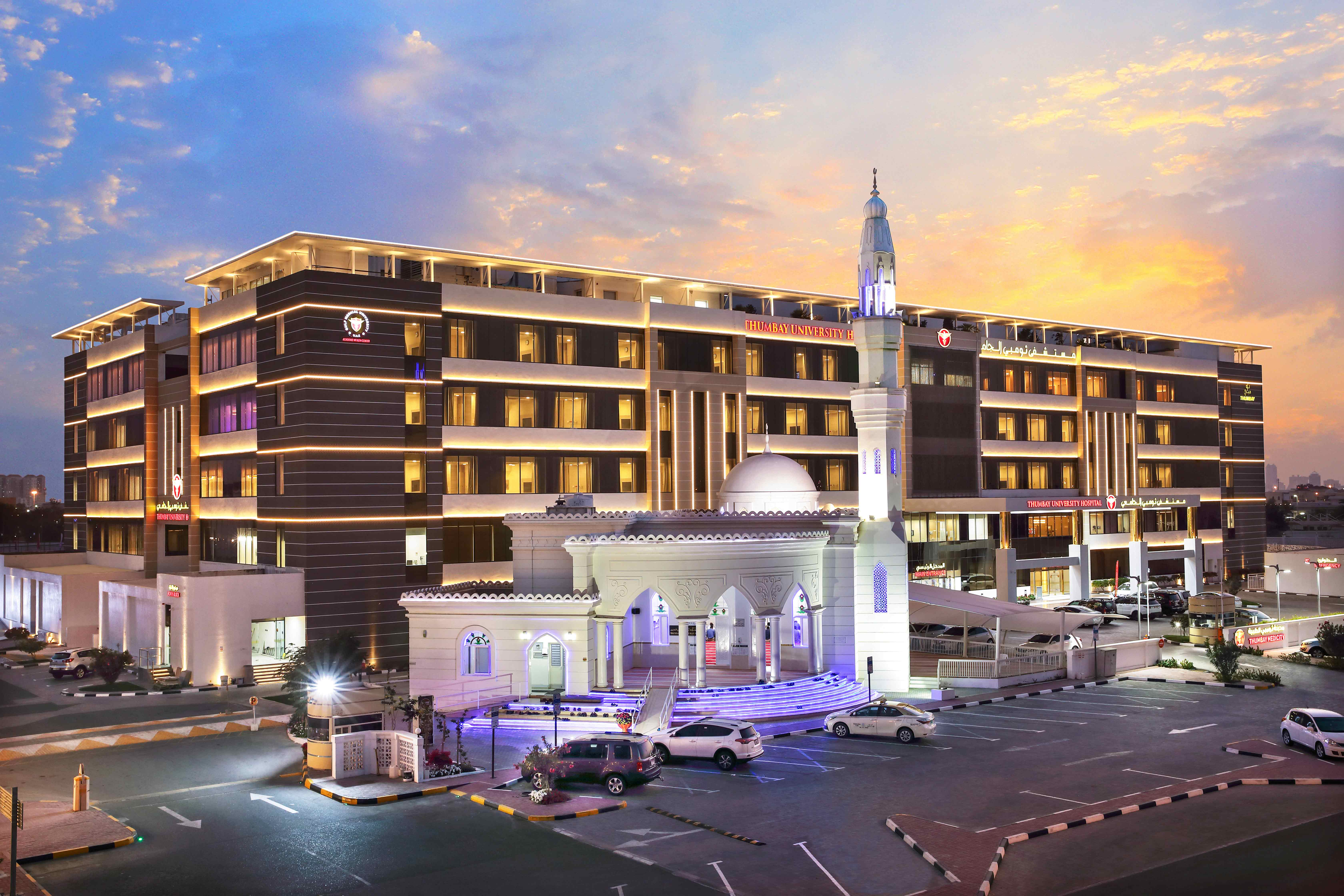
Thumbay University Hospital

Healthcare in the Emirate of Ajman can be divided into two different sectors, Public and Private. Public Healthcare Facilities in the emirate are administered by the Emirates Health Services (EHS).

== Ajman Stud ==
Ajman Stud Founded in 2002 by H.H Sheikh Ammar bin Humaid Al Nuaimi, Crown Prince of Ajman, Ajman Stud is a prestigious Arabian horse breeding facility located 30 km from Ajman city center. Specializing in purebred Arabians for beauty shows, it has earned over 200 first-place wins globally, showcasing elite bloodlines and contributing to the UAE’s equestrian heritage.

== Notable people ==
- Adel Al-Hosani (born 1989), Emirati football goalkeeper
- Aisha Al Kaabi (born 1973), Emirati poet, writer, artist and translator
- Kulthum Bin Masoud (born 1957), Emirati journalist, writer, poet and businesswoman
- Khalfan Mubarak (born 1995), Emirati football player
- Humaid bin Rashid Al Nuaimi (born 1931), Current ruler of the Emirate
- Rashid bin Humaid Al Nuaimi III (born 1902), Former ruler of the Emirate and a co-founder of the United Arab Emirates
