= Finbar Kenny =

American philatelist and businessman

Finbar B. Kenny
- Born: March 3, 1917
- Died: January 13, 2010 (aged 92)
- Occupation: Philatelist

Finbar B. Kenny (3 March 1917 – 13 January 2010) was an American philatelist and businessman.

Kenny worked as manager of the stamp department of Macy's. He arranged the sale of the unique British Guiana 1c magenta in 1940, and continued to look after it for the next thirty years, often being mistaken for its owner.

In the 1960s, Kenny made deals with a number of the Trucial States in order to print stamps on their behalf for sale to collectors. These Dune Stamps consisted of large numbers of brightly colored stamps whose topics had little or no relationships to their issuing countries. The arrangement ended when the United Arab Emirates was formed in 1971. Today, collectors generally ignore them.

In 1965, Kenny was hired by the Prime Minister of the Cook Islands, Sir Albert Henry, to print stamps for collectors. Kenny's firm, Cook Islands Development Company, a subsidiary of his Kenny International Corporation, had the exclusive franchise as the nation's overseas postal agent, and splits the profits 50–50 with the government. In 1978 Henry asked Kenny for an advance of NZ$337,000 on the next year's philatelics revenue to finance his re-election campaign. Henry used the money to fly voters in to the country, even though the money had been earmarked for the nation's old age pension scheme. The Chief Justice of the time, Sir Gaven Donne, nullified the extra votes and installed Thomas Davis as prime minister. In 1979, Kenny became the first American to plead guilty of violating the 1977 Foreign Corrupt Practices Act, which prohibits Americans from paying bribes overseas to increase business. The courts considered the advance a bribe, and Kenny was fined $50,000. He also returned the NZ$337,000 to the Cook Islands government.
