= List of hospitals in the United Arab Emirates =

This is a list of hospitals in the U.A.E. They are categorized by emirates/regions whether they are government or private hospitals, and number of beds

== Abu Dhabi ==
- Ahalia Hospital, Abu Dhabi (Private)
- Al Noor Hospital
- Bareen International Hospital, MBZ
- Al Raha Hospital, Abu Dhabi (Private)
- American Hospital Abu Dhabi
- Burjeel Hospital, Abu Dhabi (Private)
- Cleveland Clinic Abu Dhabi, multi-speciality luxury hospital in Abu Dhabi
- Danat Al Emarat Women & Children’s Hospital, Abu Dhabi
- Dar Al Shifaa (Private)
- Healthpoint hospital a Mubadala company, is a multi-specialty, integrated practice hospital located in Zayed Sports City, Abu Dhabi.
- LLH Hospital, Abu Dhabi (Private)
- LLH Hospital Musaffah, Abu Dhabi (Private)
- Lifecare Hospital, Musaffah, Abu Dhabi (Private)
- Lifecare Hospital, Baniyas, Abu Dhabi (Private)
- Medeor 24x7 Hospital, Abu Dhabi (Private)
- Mediclinic Hospital, Abu Dhabi (Private)
- Harmony Medical Center Khalifa City مركز هارموني الطبي (Private)
- National Hospital, Abu Dhabi (Private)
- Nation Hospital, Abu Dhabi (Private)
- Phoenix Specialty Hospital, Abu Dhabi (Private)
- NMC Specialty Hospital, Abu Dhabi (Private)
- Salama Hospital, Abu Dhabi (Private)
- Harmony Medical Center Al Khaleej Al Arabi Str. مركز هارموني بلس الطبي (Private)
- Shaikh Khalifa Medical City (Abu Dhabi Health Services Company (SEHA), managed by Cleveland Clinic)
- Sheikh Shakhbout Medical City (SEHA - Managed by Mayo Clinic)
- Universal Hospital, Abu Dhabi (Private)
- Harmony Medical Center Mohammed Bin Zayed مركز هارموني المتقدم الطبي محمد بن زايد (Private)
- Ittihad Medical Center Abu Dhabi

== Ajman ==
- Amina Hospital
- Ajman Specialty General Hospital (Government of Ajman)
- NMC Medical Centre, Ajman
- Prime Medical Center - Ajman
- Saudi German Hospital Ajman
- Sheikh Khalifa Medical City Ajman (under the aegis of Ministry of Presidential Affairs)
- Sheikh Khalifa Hospital - Masfoot
- Thumbay Hospital Nuaimiya Ajman (Thumbay Group)
- Thumbay University Hospital Al Jurf Ajman (Thumbay Group)
- Thumbay Physical therapy and Rehabilitation Hospital Al Jurf Ajman (Thumbay Group)

== Al Ain ==
- Al Ain Hospital, Al Ain (managed by SEHA))
- Ain Al Khaleej Hospital, Al Ain (Private)
- Burjeel Royal Hospital, Al Ain (Private, managed by VPS Healthcare Group)
- Emirates International Hospital, Al Ain (Private)
- Medeor 24x7 International Hospital, Al Ain (Private, managed by VPS Healthcare Group)
- Mediclinic Al Jowhara (Mediclinic International)
- Mediclinic Al Ain (Mediclinic International)
- NMC Specialty Hospital, Al Ain (Private, managed by NMC Health)
- Kanad Hospital (Private, managed by CURE International)
- Sheikh Tahnoon bin Mohammed Medical City (STMC)
- Tawam Hospital, Al Ain (managed by SEHA)affiliation with Johns Hopkins Medicine)
- The Heart Medical Center, Al Ain, comprehensive multispecialty services for children, adolescents, and adults with complex medical problems.
- Universal Hospital, Al Ain (Private, managed by Universal Hospital, Abu Dhabi))

== Dubai ==
=== Healthcare Facilities under Dubai Health Authority (DHA) ===
- Adam Vital Hospital, Al Garhoud, Dubai (private) Adam Vital Hospital
- Doctors Clinic Diagnostic Centre, Building 64, Oud Metha, Dubai Healthcare City (private) Doctors Clinic Diagnostic Center
- HealthHub Clinic - Al Karama (private)
- HealthHub Day Surgery Center - Dubai Festival City Mall (private)
- HealthHub Clinic - Jebel Ali Dubai Festival Plaza (private)
- HealthHub Clinic - Discovery Gardens (private)
- HealthHub Clinic - JVC (Jumeirah Village Circle) (private)
- HealthHub Clinic - Dubai Silicon Oasis (private)
- Athena Dermatology Clinic (private) The Greens, Dubai
- New Al Shefa Clinit JLT - Day Surgery Center, Jumeirah Lake Towers, HDS Business, 17th Floor
- Glow Aesthetics Dermatology Clinic - Dubai
- Vitruvian Italian Physiotherapy Center Tecom, Barsha Heights
- Top Smile Dental Clinic, Sultan Business Center Oud Metha, Dubai(private)
- Signature Plus Clinic, Dubai
- Armada Hospital, Armada One Day Surgical Center, Jumeirah Lake Towers, Armada Towers, Armada Group (private)
- Armada Medical Center, Jumeirah Lake Towers, Armada Towers
- Aster Hospitals, (Mankhool, Qusais)
- Burjeel Hospital for Advanced Surgery, Dubai (private)
- Canadian specialist hospital ,DUBAI abu hail
- Carewell Medical Center (Carewell Clinics JVC)
- Derma One Medical Center Dubai (private)
- Dr. Joy Dental Clinic
- Le Denté Dental Clinic
- Dubai London Hospital (private)
- Dr. Michael's Dental Clinic (private)
- Micris Dental Clinic (private)
- Dr. Helena Taylor Clinic FZ LLC (Private)
- Dubai Hospital, (Dubai Health Authority)
- Dubai Cosmetic Surgery Clinic
- Enfield Royal Clinic (private)
- Perfect Doctors Clinic (private)
- Estheticare Clinic (private)
- Dentistree Dental Clinic (private)
- Emirates Hospital Jumeirah, Dubai (private)
- Fakeeh University Hospital, Dubai (private)
- Go Dental Clinic
- Fakeeh Medicentres - Dubai Mall
- Fakeeh Medicentres - Motor City
- Fakeeh Medicentres - Al Furjan
- Fakeeh Medicentres - Dubai Silicon Oasis
- Fakeeh Medicentres - Jumeirah Park
- Harmony Medical Center Dubai - Jumeirah (private)
- KidsHeart Medical Center Dubai (private), multispecialty services for children, adolescents, and adults</ref name=Kids>.
- Kings College Hospital, Dubai (private)
- Mediclinic Welcare Hospital Dubai (Mediclinic International)
- Mediclinic Parkview Hospital (Mediclinic International)
- Medeor 24x7 Hospital, Dubai (private)
- New Al Shefa Day Surgery Center (private)
- Prime Hospital, Dubai (private)
- Cosmo Health Medical Center
- IV Wellness Lounge Clinic Limited (private)
- Rashid Hospital, (Dubai Health Authority)
- Saudi German Hospital Dubai, Dubai (private)
- Saudi German Clinics Jumeirah
- Zulekha Hospitals, Al-Nahda, Dubai
- NMC Specialty Hospital
- NMC Hospital, Dubai Investments Park
- Talking Brains Center
- Pearl Dental Clinic Dubai

=== Healthcare Facilities under Dubai Healthcare City (DHCC) ===
- American Academy of Cosmetic Surgery Hospital, Dubai (private)
- Dr. Sulaiman Al-Habib Medical Center
- Mediclinic City Hospital (Mediclinic International)
- Moorfields Eye Hospital (Dubai) Dubai (affiliated with Moorfields Eye Hospital in London)
- Clemenceau Medical Center - Dubai (affiliated with Clemenceau Medical Center International)
- Iranian Hospital, Dubai
- Gargash Hospital (private)

=== Healthcare Facilities under Emirates Health Services (EHS) ===
- Al Amal Psychiatric Hospital
- Al Awir Health Center
- Al Baraha Smart Medical Examination Center for Residency
- Al Ittihad Health Center
- Al Kuwait Hospital
- Al Muhaisnah Health Center
- Al Nahda Medical Examination Center for Residency
- Al Quoz Medical Examination Center for Residency
- Al Reffa Medical Examination Center for Residency
- Dragon Mart Medical Examination Center for Residency
- Dubai Public Health Center
- Dubai Specialized Dental Center
- Ibn Battuta Medical Examination Center for Residency
- Salah Al Din Medical Examination Center for Residency
- Saraya Medical Examination Center for Residency

== Fujairah ==
- Al Sharq Hospital
- Fujairah Hospital
- Sheikh Khalifa Hospital Fujairah
- Thumbay Hospital, Fujairah (Thumbay Group)

== Ras Al Khaimah ==
- Al Zahrawi Hospital
- Al Oraibi Hospital
- RAK Hospital
- Saqr Hospital
- Sheikh Khalifa Specialty Hospital
- Thumbay clinic

== Sharjah ==
- Oriana Hospitals & Clinics
- Central Hospital
- Al Qasimi Hospital
- Zulekha Hospitals
- Al Zahra Hospital
- Kalba Hospital
- Al Dhaid Hospital
- Khorfakkan Hospital
- Kuwait Hospital
- University Hospital of Sharjah

== Umm Al Quwain ==
- Sheikh Khalifa General Hospital
- Thumbay clinics (owned by Thumbay Group)
