= Ilman Shazhaev =

- Born: May 13, 1993 (age 33); Grozny, Chechen Republic
- Education: Moscow State Road & Automobile University; Harbin Institute of Technology
- Occupations: scientist, IT engineer, entrepreneur
- Known for: Founder and CEO of Dizzaract

Ilman Shazhaev (born 13 May 1993) is a scientist, IT engineer, and AI/tech entrepreneur who has published over 40 peer-reviewed research papers and holds registered patents in AI, deeptech, and gaming. He is the founder and CEO of Dizzaract, a technology group building AI and gaming digital intelligence infrastructure based in Abu Dhabi.

== Early life and education ==
Ilman Shazhaev was born on the 13 May 1993 in Grozny, Chechen Republic. He grew up in Grozny and later relocated to the Republic of North Ossetia. From 2011 to 2013, Shazhaev studied at Grozny State Oil Technical University, where he also worked as a research engineer in the Department of Automation and Control and as an assistant to the Head of Grozny State Oil Technological University. During this period he competed in several national programmes for young scientists and entrepreneurs. In 2012, he received a gold medal at the Russian Federal Young Scientists Contest for his innovative project of a new-generation electricity counter.

He transferred to Moscow to complete his degree at Moscow State Road & Automobile University with a BS degree in Informatics and Computing, graduating in 2015. During this period he received two Presidential Scholarships of the Russian Federation, two government scholarships for academic achievement in science.

In 2014, Shazhaev won a grant from the Chinese government and relocated to China.

From 2015 to 2017, he studied Mechanical Engineering in Harbin Institute of Technology (HIT), a member of the C9 League , focusing on research and implementation of Swarm Intelligence on humanoid robots. His dissertation covered the development of an AI algorithm enabling a group of humanoid NAO robots to collaboratively solve a maze navigation task.

In 2015, he got the Chinese Government Scholarship, and in 2017 — Shanghai Government Scholarship.

While studying in Harbin, Shazhaev initiated a business startup program in partnership with the Heilongjiang province government of China and Wanda Group, supporting ten startups and businesses in entering the Chinese market.

In 2017, he was accepted into the doctoral programme at Shanghai Jiao Tong University, one of China's top three universities and a member of the Chinese Ivy League (C9 League). He studied at Antai College of Economics and Management, specialising in Management of Science and Engineering. The programme was funded by a Shanghai Government Scholarship.

From 2017 Ilman was a PHD candidate in Management of Science and Engineering, Shanghai Jiao Tong University, China.

== Career ==
During his doctoral studies, he founded OneBoost, a company focused on the construction, investment, and management of Bitcoin mining data centres, with operations in China, Malaysia, Hong Kong, and Russia. In 2020 he relocated to the UAE.

=== Acoustery ===
In 2019, he cofounded Acoustery, a health tech company that developed AI technology for the early detection of respiratory diseases through cough acoustics. Pilot projects and clinical tests were conducted in partnership with medical institutions including Dubai Health Authority, Abu Dhabi Health Authority, Rashid Hospital, Sheikh Zayed Military Hospital, and Sharjah Medical University. Results confirmed the technology's efficacy and the research was published in the IEEE Open Journal of Engineering in Medicine and Biology in 2021.

=== Gaming and AI ===
In 2022, Shazhaev co-founded FAR Labs, a research laboratory focused on AI-driven gaming data and infrastructure. The team developed hardware and software for reading, structuring, and monetising in-game data, including sensor-equipped headsets, mice and keyboards, and facial emotion recognition technology. FAR Labs later shifted its focus to AI infrastructure, developing technology that enables AI inference on idle consumer and enterprise GPUs, including hardware belonging to small data centres and individual users.

In 2022, Ilman Shazhaev founded Farcana, a game studio based in Dubai that became the largest game studio in the UAE. The studio's flagship title, also called Farcana, is a PvP hero shooter.

In 2025, he launched Dizzaract, an Abu Dhabi-based company building gaming and artificial-intelligence infrastructure.
