= Muthana Mithqal Sartawi =

Kuwaiti orthopedic surgeon

- مثنى مثقال السرطاوي
- Born: Kuwait
- Education: Rush University Medical Center
- Occupations: Orthopedic Surgeon; Medical Inventor
- Known for: Presenting Modified Intervastus Approach
- Website: drsartawi.com

Muthana Mithqal Sartawi is a Kuwaiti orthopedic surgeon specialized in joint replacement surgery. He is best known for inventing the Modified Intervastus Approach surgical approach used in total knee replacement surgery.

== Background ==
Sartawi completed his medical degree from Arabian Gulf University in 2006, and went on to conduct his training at the General Surgery Department at Farwaniya Hospital in Kuwait. In 2007, he relocated to Canada after receiving a scholarship to train as a neurosurgery resident for three years in the department of neurosurgery at the University of Alberta, Canada. In 2013, he completed residency at the department of orthopedics at Dalhousie University in Halifax, Canada.

In 2014, Sartawi completed a fellowship in joint replacement surgery at Rush University Medical Center in Chicago, Illinois. He joined the faculty of surgery at the University of Illinois from 2014 to 2019 and has served as director of the Joint Care Center of Excellence at Presence Hospital in Illinois. He was appointed head of the orthopedic department at Christie Clinic in Champaign, Illinois. Sartawi is both American and Canadian board-certified. He has operated on notable individuals, including Saud bin Fahd Al Saud and was part of the medical team that performed the knee replacement for George W. Bush.

== Innovations ==
Sartawi has received several patents in the field of orthopedics. In 2018, Sartawi patented the Modified Intervastus Approach, a surgical technique in knee replacement surgery where the surrounding ligaments and muscles of the knee are preserved, helping to shorten the recovery period. This technique was patented by the United States Patent and Trademark Office. In the same year, Sartawi was awarded a patent for the Acetabular Cup and Insertion Handle, a hip-replacement implant system that features an acetabular cup with holes for K-wires and variable-angle locking screws to enhance stability during surgery. It includes a specially engineered insertion handle that securely attaches to the cup to improve control and accuracy while minimizing torque during detachment. The design supports more precise implantation, especially in complex or revision hip procedures.

In 2020, Sartawi patented the Proximally fitting femoral component with adjunctive screw fixation, a design for the femoral (thigh-bone) part of a hip prosthesis. The implant has a stem that goes inside the femur, the design allows using screws in the proximal part (near the top) to give better stability (rotational and axial) when needed.

In 2023, Sartawi presented the Modified Intervastus Arthrotomy Closure Method, a patented suturing technique designed to create a durable, water-tight closure after total knee arthroplasty performed via the modified intervastus approach. Its intersecting stitch pattern enhances stability, reduces postoperative drainage, and supports faster, complication-free recovery. With the introduction of the Modified Intervastus Arthrotomy Closure Method, Sartawi became the first Arab surgeon to receive a patent for an innovative deep-wound closure technique.

In 2025, Sartawi invented an alignment device for the Proximally Fitting Femoral Component with adjunctive Screw Fixation, a hip implant design that combines a proximally press-fit femoral stem with optional transverse screw fixation to enhance rotational and axial stability using a removably attachable device. It was patented to provide surgeons with a more secure and anatomically adaptable solution for complex or unstable hip arthroplasty cases.

=== Kuwait Stitch ===
In 2024, he invented the Kuwait Stitch (or Stitching Method for Everted Skin Wound Closure), a novel surgical suture technique, designed for precise wound closure with reduced tension. It involves angling the needle away from the incision upon entry and towards it upon exit, which captures more dermis than epidermis. The Kuwait Stitch is the first medical wound-closure technique to be named after an Arab country. The method is designed to create controlled eversion of skin edges to improve epidermal and dermal tissue approximation during wound closure, optimize cosmetic and functional healing, and reduce postoperative complications associated with surgical skin incisions. The Kuwait Stitch is recognized as the first patented surgical innovation registered under the name of the State of Kuwait.

Suturing methods for deep or multilayered surgical wounds play a central role in distributing tension and ensuring optimal healing. Conventional superficial wound closure techniques may allow the edges of the wound to roll inward, which can negatively affect both the strength and aesthetic quality of the healed incision. Sartawi developed the Kuwait Stitch to counter these issues by incorporating a suturing configuration that maintains outward eversion of the wound edges throughout the healing process, thereby promoting improved biomechanical stability.

The Kuwait Stitch was conceived and refined through Sartawi's work in orthopedic and joint replacement surgery, where controlling wound tension is vital to patient recovery and long-term outcomes. The technique evolved through clinical observation and iterative application, eventually forming a standardized method for deep-wound closure. Sartawi submitted the technique for patent review, resulting in approval in the United States. The patent brought international visibility to the innovation and marked a notable milestone as the first surgical method patented under Kuwait's name.

The Kuwait Stitch uses a distinctive suture path designed to produce deliberate eversion of the wound edges. The configuration allows the surgeon to capture deep layers of tissue while minimizing trauma to the incision margins, promoting a more even distribution of tension across the wound. This eversion counteracts the natural tendency of wound edges to fold inward and is intended to enhance healing strength, reduce the likelihood of dehiscence, and improve aesthetic results. A detailed biomechanical explanation and early clinical outcomes of the technique were published in a peer-reviewed surgical journal.

Clinical use of the Kuwait Stitch has been documented in orthopedic procedures, trauma surgeries, and deep soft-tissue closures where layered approximation is required. Surgeons implementing the method have reported improved wound-edge alignment, greater resistance to tension forces, and a lower incidence of complications such as wound dehiscence. Early clinical feedback indicates that the technique offer advantages in both functional and cosmetic outcomes when compared with traditional skin incision suturing approaches.

== Recognitions ==
Sartawi has received multiple official recognitions for his contributions to orthopedic innovation. In 2017, his achievements were recognized by Emir of Kuwait Sabah al-Ahmad al-Jaber al-Sabah who named Sartawi as a source of pride to Kuwait, and by the Kuwait Youth Sports Authority. In 2021, he was honored by the Governor of Farwaniya, Sheikh Faisal Al-Hamoud, for his achievements in the field of orthopedic surgery. In the same year, the Dubai Health Authority highlighted Sartawi's minimally invasive knee replacement technique during the Dubai Month of Innovation.

In 2022, Sartawi was honored by the Emir of Kuwait, Sheikh Mishal Al-Ahmad Al-Jaber Al-Sabah, for his patented surgical technique Kuwait Stitch, praising his medical achievement, naming it a significant addition to the world of medicine in general and to surgery in particular.

In 2023, Sartawi received the King's College London Award for Best Visiting Physician of 2023. In 2024, he was recognized by the Crown Prince of Kuwait, Sheikh Sabah Al-Khalid Al-Hamad Al-Sabah, for additional patented work. Sartawi's achievements were formally acknowledged by the Kuwait Ministry of Health. Dubai Health Experience (DXH), the medical tourism department of the Dubai Health Authority, has also showcased several of his surgical outcomes across its official platforms.

In 2023, the Emir of Kuwait, Sheikh Mishal Al-Ahmad Al-Jaber Al-Sabah, honored Sartawi for developing the technique and securing its international patent registration.

== Selected publications ==
Selected publications by Muthana M. Sartawi include the following:

- Sartawi, Muthana M.; Kohlmann, James M.; Abdelsamie, Karam R.; Rahman, Hafizur (2023-06-12). "Water-Tight Arthrotomy Joint Closure of Modified Intervastus Approach in Total Knee Arthroplasty". Journal of Clinical Medicine. 12 (12): 3985. doi:10.3390/jcm12123985. ISSN 2077-0383. PMC 10299608. PMID 37373683.
- Sartawi, Muthana M.; Rahman, Hafizur; Yousef, Ibraheem; Kohlmann, James M. (2022). "The Kuwait Stitch: A novel surgical technique for surgical wound closures". Health Science Reports. 5 (4) e667. doi:10.1002/hsr2.667. ISSN 2398-8835. PMC 9178401. PMID 35702515.
- Sartawi, Muthana M.; Rahman, Hafizur; Kohlmann, James M. (2021-06-17). "Medial Tibial Plateau Stress Fracture Following Navigated Total Knee Arthroplasty: Two Case Reports". American Journal of Case Reports. 22: e933005-1-e933005-5. doi:10.12659/AJCR.933005. ISSN 1941-5923. PMC 8323742. PMID 34312363.
- Sartawi, Muthana M.; Rahman, Hafizur; Kohlmann, James M.; Levine, Brett R. (2020). "First Reported Series of Outpatient Total Knee Arthroplasty in the Middle East". Arthroplasty Today. 6 (4): 807–812. doi:10.1016/j.artd.2020.07.038. PMC 7501405. PMID 32995414.
- Sartawi, M; Rahman, H; Kohlmann, J; Leighton, R; Kersh, ME (2018). "A Retrospective Analysis of the Modified Intervastus Approach". American Journal of Orthopedics. 47 (12). doi:10.12788/ajo.2018.0106 (inactive 25 August 2026). PMID 30650164.
- Kohlman, James; Valle, Craig; Sartawi, Muthana (2018). "Modified Intervastus Approach to the Knee". The Journal of Knee Surgery. 31 (5): 422–424. doi:10.1055/s-0037-1604150. PMID 28701009. S2CID 837175.
- Sartawi, Muthana; Zurakowski, David; Rosenberg, Aaron (2018-03-01). "Implant Survivorship and Complication Rates After Total Knee Arthroplasty With a Third-Generation Cemented System: 15-Year Follow-Up". American Journal of Orthopedics. 47 (3). doi:10.12788/ajo.2018.0018 (inactive 25 August 2026). PMID 29611846.
- Sartawi, Muthana; Quateen, Ahmed; Nataraj, Andrew; Medairos, Robert (2015). "Spinal Intradural Aneurysmal Bone Cyst: A Case Report". World Neurosurgery. 84 (2): 593.e1–593.e5. doi:10.1016/j.wneu.2015.02.012. PMID 25769483.
- Darsaut, Tim E.; Sartawi, Muthana M.; Dhaliwal, Perry; Fox, Richard J. (2009). "Rapid magnetic resonance imaging–guided reduction of craniovertebral junction deformities". Journal of Neurosurgery: Spine. 10 (1): 27–32. doi:10.3171/2008.10.spi08304. PMID 19119929.
