= CCAD =

CCAD could refer to

- Columbus College of Art and Design Columbus, Ohio
- Chelsea College of Art and Design, part of the University of the Arts London
- Cleveland College of Art and Design, the former name of The Northern School of Art, Middlesbrough & Hartlepool, United Kingdom
- Corcoran College of Art and Design, Washington, D.C.
- Cleveland Clinic Abu Dhabi, Abu Dhabi, United Arab Emirates
- Collins Cobuild Advanced Dictionary, Collins Cobuild Advanced Learner's English Dictionary, HarperCollins Publishers Ltd.
