= Eurasian Universities Union =

- Founded: 2008
- Headquarters: Istanbul, Turkey
- Members: 95
- Board of directors: Prof. Dr. Mustafa Aydin - Istanbul Aydın University; Prof. Dr. Hamlet Isakhanli - Khazar University; Prof. Dr. Corina Dumitrescu - Dimitrie Cantemir University; Prof. Dr. Nanna Suryana Herman - University Technical Malaysia Melaka
- Affiliations: ENQA
- Website: http://euras-edu.org/

Eurasian Universities Union (EURAS) is a non-profit Eurasia organization affiliated with the European Association for Quality Assurance in Higher Education (ENQA) founded by seven state universities from Eurasia to establish collaborations between European and Asian Universities and to exchange between faculty, students, and staffs. The Project is similar to the EU's Erasmus Programme but covers European (including those in non-EU countries) and Asian Universities.

== Members ==
The seven founding members of the organization are:

- Çanakkale 18 Mart University, Turkey
- Gabrova Technical University, Bulgaria
- Institute of Management, Business and Law, Russia
- Istanbul Aydın University, Turkey
- Khazar University, Azerbaijan
- Komrat State University, Moldova
- Selçuk University, Turkey

EURAS members recognize each other, and include:

- ABMS the Open University of Switzerland, Switzerland
- Academy of Public Administration, Moldova
- Al al-Bayt University, Jordan
- Almaty Technological University, Kazakhstan
- American University for Humanities, Georgia
- American University in the Emirates, UAE
- Amirkabir University of Technology, Iran
- Andrei Şaguna University-Constanta, Romania
- An-Najah National University, Palestine
- Asfendiyarov Kazakh National Medical University, Kazakhstan
- Azerbaijan State Economy University, Azerbaijan
- Bahria University, Pakistan
- Baku Asiya University, Azerbaijan
- Baku State University, Azerbaijan
- Belgrade Banking Academy, Serbia
- Budapest Business School, Hungary
- Business Academy Aarhus, Denmark
- Business School Notenboom, The Netherlands
- Catholic Kwandong University, Republic of Korea
- Caucasian Institute of Democratic Integration, Georgia
- Crimea State Engineers and Pedagogical, Ukraine
- Dagestan State Pedagogical University, Dagestan
- David Tvildiani Medical University, Georgia
- Dimitrie Cantemir Christian University, Romania
- EMUNI University, Slovenia
- Epoka University, Albania
- European College “JURIDICA”, Kosovo
- Final International University, Turkish Republic of North Cyprus
- Fırat University, Turkey
- Gazi University, Turkey
- Geneva Business School, Switzerland
- Gotse Delcev University, Macedonia
- Gulf Medical University - Ajman, UAE
- Hamdard University, Pakistan
- Higher College of Technology, UAE
- ILIRIA Royal University, Kosovo
- Institute of System Technologies, Russia
- International Business School CESTE, Spain
- International University of Sarajevo, Bosnia and Herzegovina
- International University of Struga, Macedonia
- Islamic Gaza University, Palestine
- Jahan Institute of Higher Education, Afghanistan
- Karachai Circassia University, Russia
- Kazakhstan Institute for Strategic Studies, Kazakhstan
- Kazan Federal University, Russia
- Kırklareli University, Turkey
- Kharazmi University Tehran, Iran
- Konstantin Preslavsky University of Shumen, Bulgaria
- Manas University, Kyrgyzstan
- Medical University of Plovdiv, Bulgaria
- Mediterranean University of Albania, Albania
- Middlesex University London, United Kingdom
- Nakhchivan University, Azerbaijan
- National Academy of Sciences of the Republic of Kazakhstan, Kazakhstan
- National University of Water Management and Natural Resources Use, Ukraine
- Odesa State Environmental University, Ukraine
- Odesa State Polytechnic National University, Ukraine
- Odlar Yurdu Universiteti, Azerbaijan
- Payame Noor University, Iran
- Penza State University, Russia
- Sagar Institute of Research, Technology and Science, India
- Sapienza University of Rome, Italy
- Sinai University, Egypt
- Sapir Academic College, Israel
- South-West University "Neofit Rilski", Bulgaria
- Spiru Haret University, Romania
- State University of Tetova, Macedonia
- Superior University, Pakistan
- Tajik State University, Tajikistan
- Tbilisi State University, Georgia
- Technical University of Sophia, Bulgaria
- The University of Kufa, Iraq
- Tiraspol Interregional University, Moldova
- University College of Applied Science, Palestine
- University College of Applied Science in Safety, Croatia
- University of Al-Muntansiriyah, Iraq
- University of Al-Qadisiyah, Iraq
- University of Baghdad, Iraq
- University of Bucharest, Romania
- University of Economics and Management, Ukraine
- University of Naples I'Orienale, Italy
- University of Palermo, Italy
- University of Porto, Portugal
- University of Prishtina, Kosovo
- University of Raparin, Iraq
- University of the Aegean, Greece
- University Technical Malaysia Melaka, Malaysia
- Usman Institute of Technology, Pakistan
- Vasile Goldis Western University Arad, Romania
- VUZF University, Bulgaria

== See also ==
- European Association for Quality Assurance in Higher Education
