= Zo & Mo Opticals =

Chain of optical shops

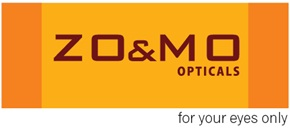

Zo & Mo is a UAE-born chain of optical shops owned and run by the Thumbay Group.

== Background ==
Zo & Mo was established in 2010 with its first outlet at GMC Hospital, Ajman. Today Zo & Mo has five outlets in the UAE; one each in the Emirates of Dubai, Sharjah & Fujairah and two in Ajman, offering a range of label frames, lenses, sunglasses, contact lenses and solutions. It operates under the Retail Division of Thumbay Group.

Zo & Mo Opticals has been among the sponsors of several health & wellness events in the UAE, like:

- Free Health Checkup Camp
- Healthy baby contest and exhibition
- Grand Doctors Meet-2012
- Annual GMC Fun Run
