= Dubai Hospital =

Dubai Hospital مستشفى دبـــي
- Dubai Health Authority
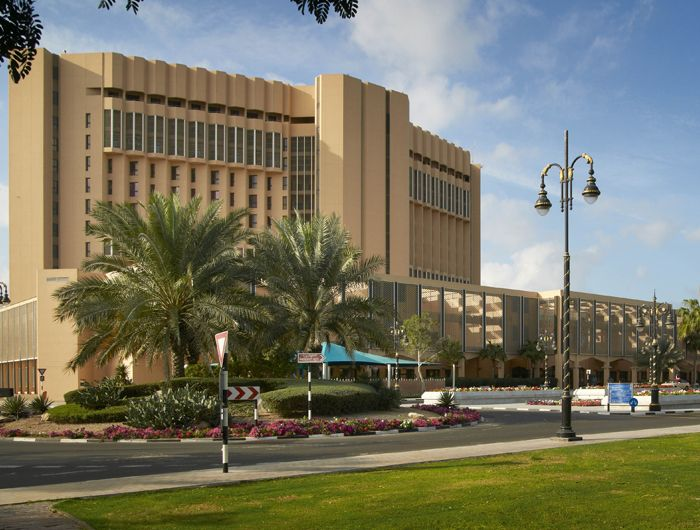

Geography
- Location: Deira, Dubai, United Arab Emirates
- Coordinates: 25°17′3″N 55°19′18″E

Organisation
- Type: District General

Services
- Emergency department: Yes
- Beds: 625

History
- Founded: 1983

Links
- Website: www.dha.gov.ae
- Lists: Hospitals in United Arab Emirates

Dubai Hospital is a public hospital in Dubai, United Arab Emirates. It is part of Dubai Health and regulated by the Dubai Health Authority (formerly known as the Dubai Department of Health and Medical Services).

The hospital consists of 14 stories, with the lower two for Accident & Emergency and outpatients, and the upper ten for wards. Dubai Hospital has been associated with the work of John R. Harris & Partners.

== History ==
The decision to construct Dubai Hospital was made in 1977. It began admitting patients in March 1983. In the early 1990s, the opening of the hospital coincided with the expansion of the surgical specialties in Dubai. The hospital established a thoracic surgery department and recruited a thoracic surgeon.

In November 2007, Dubai Hospital received Joint Commission International (JCI) hospital accreditation. A new accreditation was awarded to Dubai Hospital by the JCI in 2020, alongside Latifa, Rashid, and Hatta Hospitals as a unified healthcare network.

In 2020, the hospital completed the first phase of an emergency department expansion and renovation, adding 50 operational emergency beds and expanding the adult surgical intensive care unit to 13 beds. In the same year, a new paediatric intensive care unit began receiving patients at Dubai Hospital. The eight-room unit was established separately from the adult intensive care unit to support paediatric services.

In May 2022, Dubai Hospital launched the Da Vinci Xi Surgical Robot for robotic-assisted minimally invasive surgery and performed its first robot-assisted surgery using the system. In August 2022, Hamdan bin Mohammed bin Rashid Al Maktoum inaugurated a new AED 177 million outpatient building at Dubai Hospital. The 32,000 square metre facility included 128 specialised clinics and was designed to serve 254 patients per hour.

== Medical Services ==
The hospital offers the following services:

- Anesthesia
- Ophthalmology
- Orthopedic
- Pediatric
- Obstetrics
- Urology
- Endocrinology
- Nephrology
- Rheumatology
- Oncology
- E.N.T.

The following clinical support services are offered:

- Radiology
- Nuclear Medicine/Medical Physics
- Physiotherapy
- Psychology Services

== See also ==
- Rashid Hospital
