= Dubai Camel Hospital =

Geography
- Location: Al Marmum, Al Ain Rd, Dubai, United Arab Emirates
- Coordinates: 24.967902°N 55.491154°E

Organisation
- Type: Specialist

Services
- Beds: 30
- Speciality: Veterinary hospital for Camels

History
- Opened: 2017

Links
- Lists: Hospitals in United Arab Emirates

The Dubai Camel Hospital is a veterinary hospital for camels in Dubai, United Arab Emirates. It is the first hospital in the world that exclusively treats camels.

== History ==
Construction for the hospital cost 40 million dirhams ($10.9 million) and it was designed by Ahmed Saffarini. When first opened, the hospital was able to admit up to 20 camels. Located near the Marmoon racetrack in the Dubai desert, the facility focused on the growing racing camel industry, although unrelated dairy and pageant camels are also seen.

The UAE's camel population has exploded over the past decade—nearly doubling between 2010 and 2017—as a result of the local professional camel racing industry, and responding to this increased demand for services, the hospital expanded in 2019 to be able to handle up to 30 camels at a time.
