= Thumbay clinic =

Thumbay Clinic is a network of family clinics across the UAE, owned by Thumbay Group. It is affiliated to the Gulf Medical University (GMU) in Ajman, UAE and provides training and research avenues to GMU students.

It offers services in various specialties such as Accident & Emergency, Anesthesiology, General Medicine, Cardiology, Pediatrics, Clinical Nutrition, Dental Center, ENT, Family Medicine, General Surgery, Internal Medicine, Neurology, Obstetrics & Gynecology, Orthopedics, Dermatology, Ophthalmology, Radiology, Pharmacy, Insurance, etc.

Thumbay Clinics are presently located at Ajman, Umm Al Quwain, Sharjah, Dubai, Fujairah and Ras Al Khaimah, and are part of the Thumbay Group's healthcare services which also include four hospitals located in Ajman, Sharjah, Fujairah and Dubai. Thumbay Clinics & Hospitals’ medical work force is drawn from 20 nationalities worldwide, speaking more than 50 languages, treating customers from more than 175 nationalities. Thumbay Clinics regularly hosts free medical camps in the UAE to reach out to the needy, as part of its Corporate Social Responsibility.
