= Danat Al Emarat Women and Children's Hospital =

Coordinates: 24°23′47″N 54°30′3″E

Danat Al Emarat Women & Children’s Hospital مستشفى دانة الإمارات للنساء والأطفال

Geography
- Location: Abu Dhabi, United Arab Emirates

Organisation
- Care system: Private
- Type: Specialist

Services
- Beds: 150
- Speciality: Women’s and Children services

History
- Founded: 2015

Links
- Website: www.danatalemarat.ae
- Lists: Hospitals in United Arab Emirates

Danat Al Emarat Hospital (DAE) (Arabic: دانة الإمارات, lit. 'Pearl of the Emirates') is a private specialist women's and children hospital in Abu Dhabi, United Arab Emirates.

Danat Al Emarat opened in August 2015 and provides maternity, neonatal, paediatric and women's healthcare services, including in high-risk pregnancy and general delivery, adult and pediatric intensive care units, and surgical procedures and a 24-hour walk in clinic. The hospital is part of the M42 healthcare network.

== History ==
Planning for Danat Al Emarat Hospital was announced in 2008, when United Eastern Medical Services signed an agreement with ParkwayHealth to provide clinical-development services and manage the planned women's and children's hospital. The hospital was designed by HKS Architects. Construction of Danat Al Emarat Hospital began with an official groundbreaking on 15 September 2009.

The hospital opened to its first patients on 6 August 2015, and was officially inaugurated by Sheikha Fatima bint Murabak on 6 December 2017.

In January 2018, Danat al Emarat and the HealthPlus Network of Specialty Centres entered into a clinical partnership with The Hospital for Sick Children (SickKids) in Toronto to support tertiary paediatric services to Abu Dhabi through physician training and clinical collaboration. In the same year, the hospital began a second phase of construction with an AED 300 million expansion announced in December 2018. The phase included the construction of a six-storey South Tower, which added 72 beds, and expanded peripartum services.

In June 2021, Mubadala Health acquired a 60 percent controlling stake in United Eastern Medical Services, bringing Danat Al Emarat into the Mubadala Health network.

In April 2023, G42 (an AI technology holding group based in Abu Dhabi) and Mubadala Investment Company combined the G42 Healthcare and Mubadala Health entities to form a new company called M42, of which the hospital became a part.

== Women's specialty services ==
Medical services offered at Danat Al Emarat for women include the following:

Obstetrics & Gynecology: Family Planning, Fetal Medicine, Gynecology, Gyne-urology Clinic, Labor and Delivery, Maternity, Obstetrics and Reproductive Medicine.

Women's Medical Services: Allergy & Immunology, Antenatal & Postnatal Clinic, Cardiology & Cardiopulmonary Clinic, Community Health, Dermatology, Dietetics, Endocrinology, Endoscopy, Internal Medicine, Osteoporosis, Pain Management, Weight Management and Woman's Health Screening.

Women's Surgical Services: Gastroenterology, General Surgery, Minimally Invasive Surgery, Obstetrics & Gynecology Surgery and Plastics & Aesthetics Surgery.

Radiology: Bone Densitometry, Cardiopulmonary Screening, General Imaging, Mammography, Ultrasound and Uro-Dynamics.

== Children's specialty services ==
Medical services offered at Danat Al Emarat for children include the following:

Children's Medical Services: Child Development, Neonatology, Neonatology and Neonatal Intensive Care Unit (NICU), Pediatrics, Pediatric Cardiology, Pediatric urology, Pediatric Pulmonology, Pediatric Endocrinology and Pediatric Intensive Care Unit.

Pediatric Surgery Specialties: Neonatal Surgery, General Pediatric Surgery, Pediatric Thoracic Surgery, Pediatric Urology, Laparoscopy and Cystoscopy, Pediatric Urodynamic Study and Multidisciplinary Antenatal Counseling.

Pediatric Surgical Conditions and Procedures: Circumcision, Inguinal Hernia & Hydrocele, Undescended Testis, Hypospadias, Urinary Incontinence, Hydronephrosis, Vesico-Ureteric Reflux, Appendicitis, Intussusception, Anorectal Malformations, Hirschprung's Disease, Hepatobiliary Surgery, Umbilical Hernia, Gastroschisis and Omphalocele, Intestinal Atresia, Esophageal Atresia, Congenital Diaphragmatic Hernia, Congenital Lung Malformations, Soft Tissue Swelling, Sclerotherapy for Vascular Malformations and Gastroesophageal Reflux.

== Facilities ==
The medical facilities at the hospital consist of 5 operation theaters, 10 delivery suites, 80 baby cribs, an Adult Intensive Care Unit (ICU), a Pediatric Intensive Care Unit (PICU), a Neonatal Intensive Care Unit (NICU) consisting of 20 beds, 5 pediatric clinics, 16 women outpatient clinics, a 24/7 outpatient clinic, Laboratory & Imaging services, Pharmacy services and retail & leisure facilities.

On 23 December 2018, Health care provider United Eastern Medical Services (UE Medical) announced the expansion of 100 new beds in the construction of a new tower which will be completed by 2020, as a part of a DH300 million expansion.

== See also ==
- List of hospitals in the United Arab Emirates
