= Rashid Hospital =

- Dubai Health Authority

Geography
- Location: Oud Metha Road, Dubai, United Arab Emirates
- Coordinates: 25°15′N 55°19′E

Organisation
- Care system: Public
- Type: District General

Services
- Emergency department: Yes, Major Trauma Centre
- Beds: 786

History
- Opened: 1973

Links
- Lists: Hospitals in United Arab Emirates

Rashid Hospital (in Arabic: مستشفى راشد) is a 786-bed government foundered hospital in Dubai, the United Arab Emirates, and is a part of the Dubai Health Authority. Built in 1973, it is the city's oldest hospital, and is located on the Oud Metha Road adjacent to Dubai Creek.

The new Trauma Centre at the hospital was completed in mid-2006 after a 7-year period since it was proposed. It can handle 7 ambulances simultaneously.

The complex includes a medical library.

In July 2006, the DOHMS (now DHA) announced a US$272 million (AED1 billion) plan to build a new 500–700 bed 30,000 m^{2} hospital within available space in the current complex. The Rashid Hospital deals with some of the heaviest volume of major trauma in the world with on average 3 to 5 cases of severe polytrauma presenting each day.

The hospital's Trauma Centre is the busiest in the region, and saw more than 166,000 patients in 2013 and evaluates between 480 and 550 patients on a daily basis. Through the end of 2012, the highest number of patients seen in a single day was 580.

In 2013, plans were announced for expansion of Rashid Hospital's Trauma Centre that would add 116 rooms and 160 beds to the facility. The expansion will also add 2 floors to the existing structure. As of January 2015 it was being reported that the target for completion of the expansion May 2015.

The Rashid Hospital expansion is only phase 1 of a larger ‘master plan’ that will see AED3 billion spent on 6 new specialized health centres, 2 hotels, and additional villas and apartments for staff, in addition to a mosque, lake and landscaped open space. Furthermore, the main hospital will be rebuilt to consist of three 300-bed towers, bringing total capacity to 900 beds.

Medical Departments

- General internal medicine
- General Surgery
- Minimal invasive surgery
- Adult and pediatric neurosurgery
- Vascular surgery
- Ortho-Trauma surgery
- Hand surgery
- Bariatric surgery
- Proctology
- Hepatobiliary and pancreatic surgery
- Spine surgery
- Cardiology
- Dermatology
- Diabetology
- Digestive diseases
- Infectious Diseases
- Anesthesia
- MICU
- SICU
- Neurology
- Plastic Surgery
- Radiology

Emergency Department Amenities

- 10 ambulance bays
- 2 helipads
- 4 resuscitation units
- The 1st STAT Scanner in the region

Awards:

- In 2004 and 2008, Rashid Hospital was awarded Hamdan Award for an Outstanding Clinical Department in the Public Sector by Hamdan Medical Award.
- In 2010 Rashid Hospital was recognized as surpassing international standards for cardiac care by the USA's Joint Commission International (JCI).
- In 2014 the Rashid Hospital Trauma Centre was ranked in the top 10 by Germany's polytrauma registry.
- In 2020, Rashid Hospital was awarded Hamdan Award for an Outstanding Clinical Department in the Public Sector in UAE.

== See also ==
- List of hospitals in the United Arab Emirates
- Dubai Hospital
