= Modified Intervastus Approach =

The Modified Intervastus Approach is a surgical technique used in total knee arthroplasty (TKA) that provides improved exposure of the knee joint while minimizing soft tissue trauma. It was developed by Muthana Sartawi as an alternative to traditional approaches such as the medial parapatellar and subvastus approaches. The technique aims to preserve the quadriceps tendon and maintain the integrity of the vastus medialis muscle, potentially leading to faster recovery and reduced postoperative pain.

== History ==
The Modified Intervastus Approach was introduced by Muthana Mithqal Sartawi in 2018 as a refinement of the classical intervastus approach. Sartawi sought to address limitations of existing approaches, such as excessive soft tissue dissection or inadequate exposure. His method modifies the plane between the vastus medialis and the quadriceps tendon, while preserving both structures.

== Surgical technique ==
The modified intervastus approach begins with a straight incision placed just to the inside of the midline of the knee. This position often avoids the very front of the knee, which may make kneeling easier after surgery. The skin and underlying tissue are cut in full thickness to protect the blood supply. The vastus medialis muscle is exposed, and the space between it and the quadriceps tendon is identified.

At the point where the vastus medialis meets the quadriceps tendon, the fascia is incised. The muscle is then carefully separated from its attachment to the tendon and gently lifted off the joint capsule, leaving enough tissue for later repair. The joint capsule is then opened along the inner side of the patella, similar to a standard medial parapatellar arthrotomy. If needed, the approach can be extended upward between the vastus intermedius and vastus medialis to expose the lower part of the femur..

== Advantages ==
The Modified Intervastus Approach offers several benefits, including preservation of the quadriceps mechanism by minimizing damage to the vastus medialis and quadriceps tendon, which may improve early postoperative strength. Studies suggest reduced postoperative pain compared to the medial parapatellar approach, as well as faster rehabilitation, with patients often achieving earlier range of motion and functional recovery. Because closure is performed in an anatomical manner, the technique avoids tissue strangulation during repair.

== Disadvantages ==
Like most surgical techniques, the Modified Intervastus Approach involves a learning curve; however, it is generally considered manageable for surgeons familiar with knee arthroplasty anatomy. In patients with significant quadriceps muscle atrophy, closure may be less robust due to thinning of the fascial layer, which can require additional reinforcement during wound closure.

== Clinical evidence ==
A study by Sartawi in 2008 reported improved early postoperative pain scores and range of motion compared to the medial parapatellar approach. A 2015 systematic review suggested that minimally invasive approaches, including the Modified Intervastus, may reduce hospital stays but noted variability in long-term outcomes.
