= RAK Hospital =

Hospital in the United Arab Emirates

- Arabian Healthcare Group

Geography
- Location: United Arab Emirates
- Coordinates: 25.768259°N 55.976288°E

Organisation
- Type: Private

Services
- Beds: 65

History
- Founded: November 25, 2007

Links
- Lists: Hospitals in United Arab Emirates

RAK Hospital (established in 2007), part of Arabian Healthcare Group, is a private hospital in the United Arab Emirates. The campus includes:

- Diagnostic facilities
- Surgical programs
- An operating theatre
- Cardiac labs
- A stroke unit
- Rehabilitation programs

The two-building campus has a built-up area of 140,000 sq ft across three levels and opened with a capacity of 65 beds. The institution was expected to become a 200-bed facility by 2024 as a result of its collaboration with CommonSpirit Health. Following the planned opening of Arabian Healthcare Group's new 209-bed in Ras Al Khaimah in 2027, RAK Hospital is expected to focus on serving patients with mid- and lower-tier health insurance only.

== History ==
RAK Hospital was inaugurated on 25 November 2007 by Sheikh Saud bin Saqr Al Qasimi. It opened as an AED 100 million multi-specialty hospital with a capacity of 65 beds in its first phase. The hospital was established as a joint initiative between the Government of Ras Al Khaimah and ETA-Star Healthcare, and was initially managed by Sonnenhof Swiss Health. The hospital was one of the first major facilities developed as part of Ras Al Khaima's initiatives to increase its healthcare infrastructure and establish the emirate as a destination for medical tourism. During its initial years of operation, the hospital primarily served patients in UAE before expanding its international patient services. By 2015, it was treating approximately 150 international patients each month, with patients travelling for specialties including neurosurgery, oncology and cardiac surgery. To support these patients, the hospital established overseas outreach offices that provided follow-up care after they returned home to their countries.

The original hospital complex comprised two buildings with a built-up area of approximately 140,000 square feet across three levels, adjacent to Saqr Hospital. The facility was designed by Ellerbe Becket, with engineering and construction supervision undertaken by DAR. The building was designed to the standards of the American Institute of Architects and included provision for intensive care units, operating theatres, treatment rooms, laboratories, and diagnostic facilities.

In 2023, Dignity Health International, part of CommonSpirit Health, acquired a minority equity stake in RAK Hospital, following a partnership between CommonSpirit Health and Arabian Healthcare Group. In the same year, RAK Hospital entered a clinical collaboration with Apollo Hospitals Group covering areas including training, telemedicine and laboratory referral services.

In 2025, Arabian Healthcare Group announced plans for a new 209-bed multi-specialty hospital in Ras Al Khaimah, scheduled to open in the third quarter of 2027. As part of the group's planned expansion, RAK Hospital is expected to focus primarily on patients covered by mid- and lower-tier health insurance, while the new hospital will focus on specialised services for patients with premium insurance.

== Areas of specialization ==
=== Interventional Cardiology and Cardiac Surgery ===
The Centre for Interventional Cardiology was launched in 2009, on the second anniversary of RAK Hospital. The department offers services such as treatment of angina, arrhythmia, blockage of coronary arteries, and valvular heart disease, as well as other surgeries.

=== Orthopedic Surgery ===
The Bone and Joint Centre offers expert diagnosis, treatment and rehabilitation for adults and children with bone, joint or connective tissue disorders.

=== Laparoscopic Surgeries and Bariatric Surgery ===
RAK Hospital conducts laparoscopic and bariatric surgeries.

=== Neuro and Spine Surgery ===
Comprising neuro ICU, advanced radiology imaging and neuro rehabilitation facilities, the Neuro and Spine Centre is equipped to deal with complicated and high-risk surgeries. The Centre also offers emergency stroke management, and specialises in the diagnosis and management of low back pain, neck pain and paralysis, pediatric neurosurgery, diagnosis and management of chronic headaches and neuro-oncology services for the brain, skull base and spinal tumours.

=== RAK Eye Care Centre ===
The centre offers a wide range of procedures and services including cataract surgery, refractive surgery (including femto laser LASIK), glaucoma and vitreoretinal surgery. It was opened in November 2014 by Sheikh Saud bin Saqr Al Qasimi.

=== Physiotherapy and Rehabilitation ===
The hospital's Physiotherapy and Rehabilitation Unit offers diverse treatments to enable people to overcome issues related to mobility, walking and balance disorders, abnormal gait patterns, poor posture and injury among other problems. In addition, the department has a strong focus on resolving challenges pre- and post-surgeries including rehabilitation after cardiac and neuro events and procedures.

== Innovations ==
RAK Hospital introduced REZUM water-vapour treatment, an innovative steam treatment, for men suffering from an enlarged prostate. The procedure takes about 20 minutes and is a non-surgical option for benign prostatic hyperplasia (BPH).

== RAK Hospital COVID-19 initiatives ==
- In february 2021, RAK Hospital began offering Bamlanivimab, a monoclonal antibody therapy, then authorised for certain high-risk patients with mild-to-moderate COVID-19 to reduce the risk of hospitalization or progression to severe disease, need for artificial ventilation and potential poor outcomes.
- During the COVID-19 pandemic, RAK Hospital operated a molecular microbiology laboratory for SARS-CoV-2 testing and whole-genome sequencing. later described as its NGS and Covid Laboratory.
- Unveiled Middle East's first-ever comprehensive complimentary online COVID-19 rehabilitation program for COVID-19 long-haulers. The initiative was launched in association with ARISE UAE, the Private Sector Alliance for Disaster Resilient Societies, a network of private sector entities led by the United Nations Office for Disaster Risk Reduction (UNDRR). This attracted international media attention, establishing the hospital's leadership on the subject.
