= Edward & Cynthia Institute of Public Health =

Academic & Research Institution

Coordinates: 12.8579°N 74.8894°E

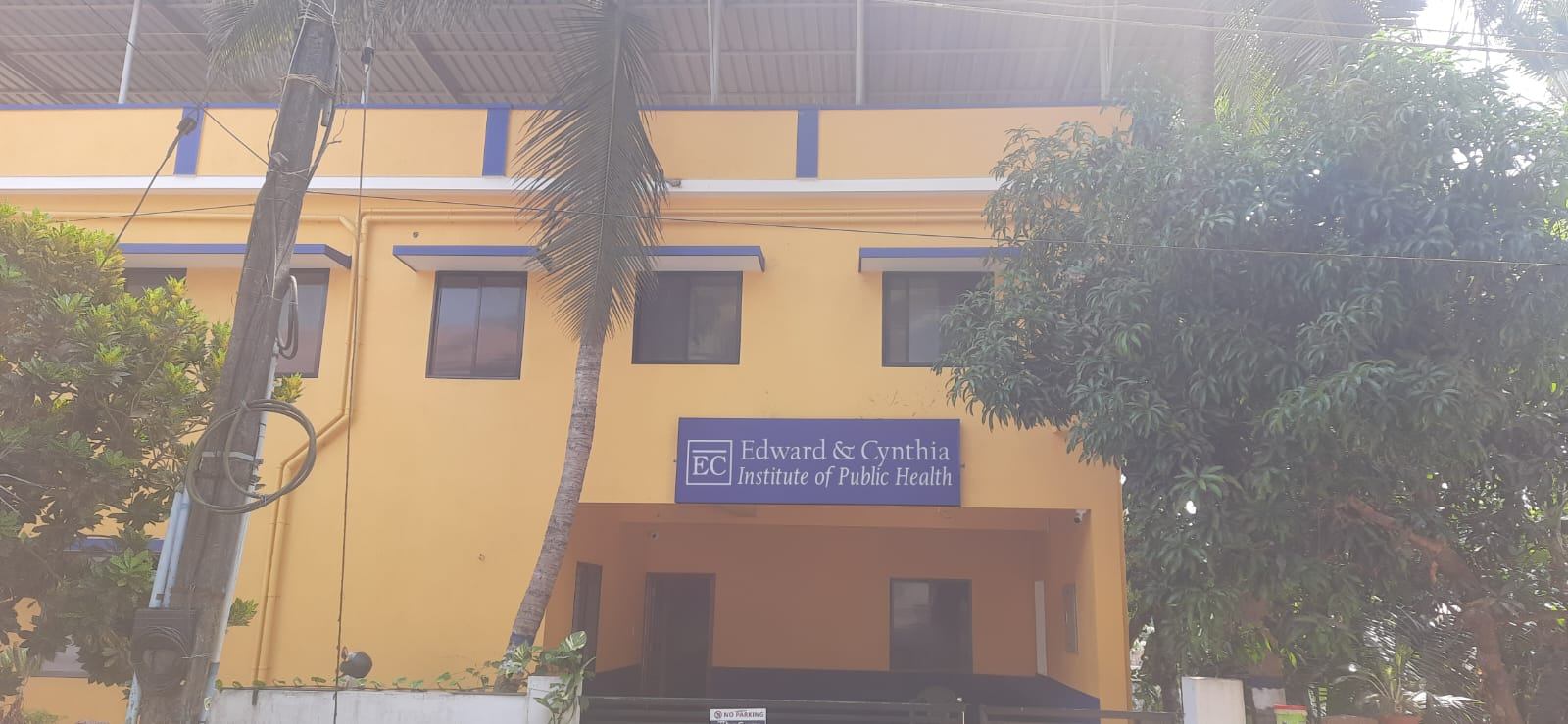
- Type: Private
- Established: 29 March 2022
- Founders: Cynthia, Edward
- Religious affiliation: Non Religious
- Location: Bajal, Pallakere, Mangaluru, Karnataka, 575007, India
- Campus: Urban
- Language: English
- Website: https://eciph.in/

Edward & Cynthia Institute of Public Health (ECIPH) is a Mangaluru based academic and research institute focused on global health and policy.

== Academic Cooperation in India ==
- Technical Cooperation with Yenepoya University to support public health programmes as an Industry Partner.

== Academic Cooperation Internationally ==
- Cooperation with Climate Change and Health Research Center at TUMS, Iran.

== Reception ==
Through the working paper on firecrackers, the researchers at the institute called for a ban on firecrackers in India. Researchers at ECIPH suggested a robust geriatric policy using assistive technology, through a publication in WHO Journal.

Undersecretaries to Government of India visited ECIPH to study the various innovative public health programmes launched by the institute and to adapt the best practices available.

ECIPH curated the End Malnutrition Initiative (EMI) which served as a pilot project to end the burden of under five child malnutrition in India. The Institute had partnered with Gulf Medical University in Ajman, UAE during COP28 to hold a scientific discussion on issues of climate change and human health.

As part of the Ayushman Bharat School Health Services, ECIPH teams & Clinton Global Initiative have partnered with various institutions to impact over 1 million school children in healthy dietary habits and lifestyles.

ECIPH Dialogues 2024 held discussions on various ways to reconstruct global health and social impact with Prof. Dr. Arthur L Frank delivering the Keynote address at Yenepoya Deemed to be University.

== Membership ==
- Global Consortium on Climate and Health Education.
