= Thumbay Hospital =

- Thumbay Group

Geography
- Location: United Arab Emirates, India

Organisation
- Care system: Private
- Type: Teaching
- Affiliated university: Gulf Medical University

Services
- Speciality: Multiple

History
- Founded: 2002

Links
- Website: Thumbay Hospital Official Website

Thumbay Hospital is a network of academic hospitals based in the UAE. They are Academic Health Centers of the Gulf Medical University (GMU) Academic Health System. Thumbay Hospitals are located in Dubai, Ajman, Sharjah and Fujairah, in addition to Hyderabad-India. The hospital chain is owned by Thumbay Group.

== Background ==
The first Thumbay Hospital, affiliated to GMU, was inaugurated in Ajman on 17 October 2002 by Sheikh Humaid Bin Rashid Al Nuaimi, as the first teaching hospital in the private sector in UAE.

Today, Thumbay Hospital is considered as one of the largest private healthcare provider in the region, catering to patients from over 175 nationalities and having staff from over 20 nationalities, speaking over 50 languages.

The hospital network has extended its services through its hospitals in Dubai, Sharjah and Fujairah in the UAE as well as in Hyderabad - India.

- Thumbay University Hospital located at Thumbay Medicity, Al Jurf, Ajman is the biggest academic hospital in the region with 350-bed capacity.
- Thumbay Dental Hospital located at Thumbay Medicity, Al Jurf, Ajman is a 60-chair dental hospital.
- Thumbay Physical Therapy & Rehabilitation Hospital located at Thumbay Medicity, Al Jurf, Ajman, is a state-of-the-art hospital for physical therapy and rehabilitation.
- Thumbay Hospital - Nuaimia, Ajman is the first private teaching hospital in Ajman with a capacity of 250 beds. It has the following departments: Accident & Emergency, Anesthesiology, Cardiology, Clinical Nutrition, Dental Centre, Dermatology, ENT, Family Medicine, General Surgery, Insurance, Internal Medicine, Laboratory Services, Nephrology, Neurology, Neurosurgery, Obstetrics & Gynaecology, Ophthalmology, Orthopedic, Patient Affairs, Pediatric Surgery, Pediatrics & Neonatology, Physical Therapy, Plastic Surgery, Psychiatry, Pulmonology, Radiology, Urology.
- Thumbay Hospital – Dubai has a capacity of 150 beds. Its departments are: Accident & Emergency, Anesthesiology, Cardiology, Dental Centre, Dermatology, ENT, General Surgery, Insurance, Internal Medicine, Laboratory Services, Nephrology, Neurology, Obstetrics & Gynecology, Ophthalmology, Orthopedic, Patient Affairs, Pediatric Surgery, Pediatrics & Neonatology, Physical Therapy, Psychiatry, Pulmonology, Radiology, Urology.
- Thumbay Hospital – Fujairah is a 60-bed facility. Departments: Anesthesiology, Cardiology, Dental, Dermatology, Emergency, ENT, General Surgery, Internal Medicine, Obstetrics & Gynecology, Ophthalmology, Orthopedics, Pediatrics, Radiology.
- Thumbay Medical & Dental Specialty Center – Sharjah also supports clinical teaching activities of the Dental College of Gulf Medical University. The following departments are available: Dental Centre, Emergency, General Surgery, Internal Medicine, Obstetrics & Gynecology, Ophthalmology, Orthopedic, Pediatrics.
- Thumbay Hospital Day Care - Rolla, Sharjah is a multispecialty hospital which offers treatments and procedures as day-cases.
- Thumbay Hospital Day Care - University City Road, Sharjah is the second multispecialty day care hospital launched by the Group.

== Accreditation & Memberships ==
- Ministry of Health UAE
- Joint Commission International (JCI)
- Medical Tourism Association
- Association of Academic Health Centers International
- International Hospital Federation
- Asian Hospital Federation
- International Board of Medicine and Surgery
- Dubai Health Experience (DXH)
