= Ajman Specialty General Hospital =

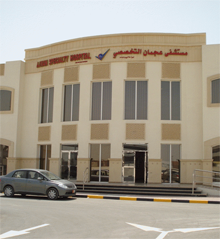

Geography
- Location: Ajman, United Arab Emirates
- Coordinates: 25.392488°N 55.481575°E

Organisation
- Care system: Public, Semi-government
- Type: District General

History
- Founded: 1 April 2008

Links
- Website: www.ajsh.ae
- Lists: Hospitals in United Arab Emirates

Ajman Specialty General Hospital is a semi-government general hospital located in Ajman, United Arab Emirates. The hospital offers outpatient services, covers a wide range of specialties, and has more than 170 employees.

== History ==
The Ajman Specialty General Hospital was established under Ruler Decree No. 5 of 2008 as the first government hospital in Ajman by decree of the ruler of Ajman, his highness Sheikh Humaid bin Rashid Al-Nuaimi.

In December 2015, Emiri Decree No. 9 of 2015 reorganised the hospital as a public entity wholly owned by the Government of Ajman, with legal status, financial independence, and an independent budget.

In July 2020, the hospital signed an agreement with Burjeel Specialty Hospital in Sharjah to refer patients for surgical procedures, advanced specialist treatment, and medical admissions.

In September 2022, Ajman Specialty General Hospital and Burjeel Specialty Hospital signed a public-private agreement under which Burjeel was to support the operation and management of Ajman Specialty General Hospital.
