= Thumbay Group =

International business conglomerate

- Type: Private company
- Industry: Conglomerate
- Founded: 1997
- Headquarters: United Arab Emirates
- Area served: Middle East
- Key people: Dr. Thumbay Moideen - Founder President, Akbar Moideen Thumbay - Vice President Healthcare Division
- Number of employees: 3000
- Website: Official Website

Thumbay Group is a privately held business conglomerate based in United Arab Emirates. Its principal business areas are healthcare, medical education, and academic health research, with other operations in diagnostics, retail, hospitality and technology.

It was founded in 1997 by Dr. Thumbay Moideen, who serves as the founder-president. Thumbay Group owns Gulf Medical University, and a network of Thumbay Hospitals and Clinics.

== History ==
Thumbay Moideen, an Indian businessman moved to the UAE in 1997 and founded Thumbay Group in Ajman. The early development of Thumbay Group was centered on medical education, beginning with Gulf medical college in Ajman in 1998, which later became Gulf Medical University. Teaching hospitals and other health services followed.

In 2010, the group announced the Dh350 million expansion plan covering the university and hospital infrastructure in Ajman.In the next decade, the group expanded into diagnostics, retail, hospitality and technology alongside its healthcare and education operations.

In 2018, Thumbay Group signed a memorandum of understanding with the Government of Ghana to establish a medical university and teaching hospital in the Greater Accra Region.

In 2023, the group's healthcare division received enterprise accreditation from Joint Commission International.

In February 2026, the group launched Thumbay Medicity Dubai, an academic medical development in Al Qusais, Dubai. Later in 2026, they established a psychiatric and rehabilitation hospital at Sharjah Healthcare City, a veterinary teaching hospital and college of veterinary medicine in Ajman, and the Thumbay International Research Centre in Al Jurf, Ajman.

== Business operations ==
=== Healthcare and medical education ===
Healthcare and medical education is the core of the group. Gulf Medical University uses the hospitals, clinics and laboratories operated by the group's healthcare division for clinical training. As of May 2026, the division operated eight hospitals, along with outpatient clinics, diagnostic laboratories, and pharmacies.

Thumbay Medicity in Al Jurf, Ajman, houses Gulf Medical University, Thumbay University Hospital, Thumbay Dental Hospital, and Thumbay Physical Therapy and Rehabilitation Hospital.

Thumbay Medicity Dubai, launched in Al Qusais includes Thumbay University Hospital Dubai, a branch campus of Gulf Medical University, research and simulation facilities, laboratories and pharmacies. The hospital's first phase covers renal dialysis, cardiology, orthopaedics and rehabilitation.

Projects under development include the Thumbay Psychiatric and Rehabilitation Hospital in Sharjah Healthcare City, scheduled for completion in 2027, the Thumbay Veterinary Teaching Hospital and Thumbay College of Veterinary Medicine, which will operate under Gulf Medical University, and the Thumbay International Research Centre, and the Thumbay Research Institute for Precision Medicine.

=== Other businesses ===
In addition to healthcare and education, Thumbay Group has operated businesses in real estate, hospitality, wellness, restaurants, coffee shops, and fitness clubs. Its hospitality operations include The Terrace, a multi-cuisine restaurant chain, and Blends & Brews Coffee Shoppe. The construction and real estate business, Thumbay Builders, undertakes the construction projects involving group's healthcare and medical facilities.

The group has also announced a Gulf Medical University campus and hospital in Belgrade, Serbia, and a medical city in Egypt.

== Recognition ==
In 2013, Thumbay Group was ranked 44th in Forbes Middle East's "Top 100 Companies Making an Impact in the Arab World". In 2026, Thumbay Moideen was ranked 15th in the hospital category of Top Healthcare Leaders by Forbes Middle East.

== Brands ==
The group's businesses include:

1. Gulf Medical University: A private university specialising in medical and health sciences education.
2. Thumbay Hospital: A network of academic hospitals in Ajman, Dubai, Sharjah & Fujairah, including Thumbay University Hospital in Ajman.
3. Thumbay Clinic: A chain of outpatient clinics in Ajman, Fujairah, Sharjah, Dubai, Umm Al Quwain and Ras Al Khaimah.
4. Thumbay Pharmacy: A chain of pharmacies with branches in Dubai, Ajman, Fujairah, Sharjah, Ras Al Khaimah, Umm al-Qaiwain.
5. Thumbay Labs: A network of diagnostic laboratories in the UAE, founded in 2001.
6. Nutri Plus Vita Store: A chain of nutritional supplement stores in Ajman, Sharjah, Fujairah and Dubai.
7. Zo & Mo Opticals: A chain of optical shops in Ajman, Dubai, Sharjah and Fujairah.
8. The Flower Shoppe: Floral Shop in Ajman.
9. Thumbay Medical Tourism: Healthcare services to international patients visiting the UAE.
10. Health Communications Division: It organises conferences, workshops, symposium and seminars.
11. Body & Soul Health Clubs & Spas: A chain of health and wellness clubs with branches in Ajman, Sharjah and Dubai.
12. The Terrace Restaurant: A multi-cuisine restaurant chain.
13. Blends and Brews Coffee Shoppe: A chain of coffee shops in the UAE.
14. Thumbay Marketing and Distribution Company (TMDC): A trading and distribution company.
15. Thumbay Builders: Construction and real estate companies in the Northern Emirates, UAE.
16. Thumbay Media: A media and publishing company ehose titles include Health, a bimonthly bilingual health and lifestyle magazine.
17. Thumbay Technologies: An information technology company.
