= Cleveland Clinic Abu Dhabi =

Coordinates: 24°29′50″N 53°23′18″E

Cleveland Clinic Abu Dhabi كليفلاند كلينك أبوظبي
- Cleveland Clinic Foundation

- Cleveland Clinic Abu Dhabi, 2016

Geography
- Location: Sowwah Square, Al Maryah Island, Abu Dhabi, United Arab Emirates

Organisation
- Care system: Joint venture between Mubadala and Cleveland Clinic
- Type: District General
- Network: M42

Services
- Beds: 411

History
- Founded: May 2015
- Opened: December 2015

Links
- Website: www.clevelandclinicabudhabi.ae
- Lists: Hospitals in United Arab Emirates

Cleveland Clinic Abu Dhabi (Arabic: كليفلاند كلينك أبوظبي, CCAD) is a hospital located in Abu Dhabi, United Arab Emirates (UAE). It has 411 beds. The hospital opened in May 2015 and is part of the M42 Group. It serves as a medical campus providing a range of specialised medical and surgical services, including transplant medicine and critical care. It is a designated Centre of Excellence for adult cardiac surgery, stroke, and adult multi-organ transplants, and is accredited for continued medical education.

== History ==
Cleveland Clinic Abu Dhabi was established through a partnership agreement signed in 2006 between Mubadala Development Company and Cleveland Clinic. The partnership was intended to establish an academic medical centre in Abu Dhabi based on Cleveland Clinic's model of care.

Construction of the project began with Mubadala Development Company appointing Aldar Properties in 2007 as the project's development manager to oversee the design, construction, and commissioning of the hospital. HDR Architecture was selected through an international design competition as master architect and design architect for the project.

The hospital was initially scheduled to begin full-service operations for patients by the fourth quarter of 2013. The hospital's opening was delayed for another 18 months, until May 2015, due to logistical challenges faced by the massive size of the project. The building is currently the largest structural steel building in the UAE, weighing more than 30,000 tonnes.

The hospital was officially inaugurated on December 3, 2015, by the then Crown Prince of Abu Dhabi and Deputy Supreme Commander of the Armed Forces Sheikh Mohammed bin Zayed Al Nahyan.

Following the introduction of legislation permitting deceased-donor transplantation in the United Arab Emirates, the hospital established a multi-organ transplant programme. In December 2017, it performed the country's first heart transplant. In February 2018, the programme also carried out the UAE's first deceased-donor liver and lung transplants.

On 16 October 2019, an opera singer and recovering stroke patient who had previously received life-saving treatment at the hospital gave a lunchtime performance to visitors and staff at CCAD.

In 2023, following the merger of Mubadala Health and G42 Healthcare to form M42, Cleveland Clinic Abu Dhabi became part of the M42 healthcare network.

In March 2023, the Fatima bint Mubarak Centre was inaugurated at CCAD. In the same year, the hospital was designated a Centre of Excellence for adult cardiac surgery by the Department of Health.

Subsequent milestones in the hospital's transplant programme included the region's first combined lung and liver transplant in 2023 and the UAE's first heart and double lung transplant in 2024. In 2025, the Department of Health designated CCAD a Centre of Excellence for adult multi-organ transplantation.

In 2025, CCAD performed the world's first remotely conducted transcontinental robot-assisted therapy for prostate cancer.

== Facilities ==
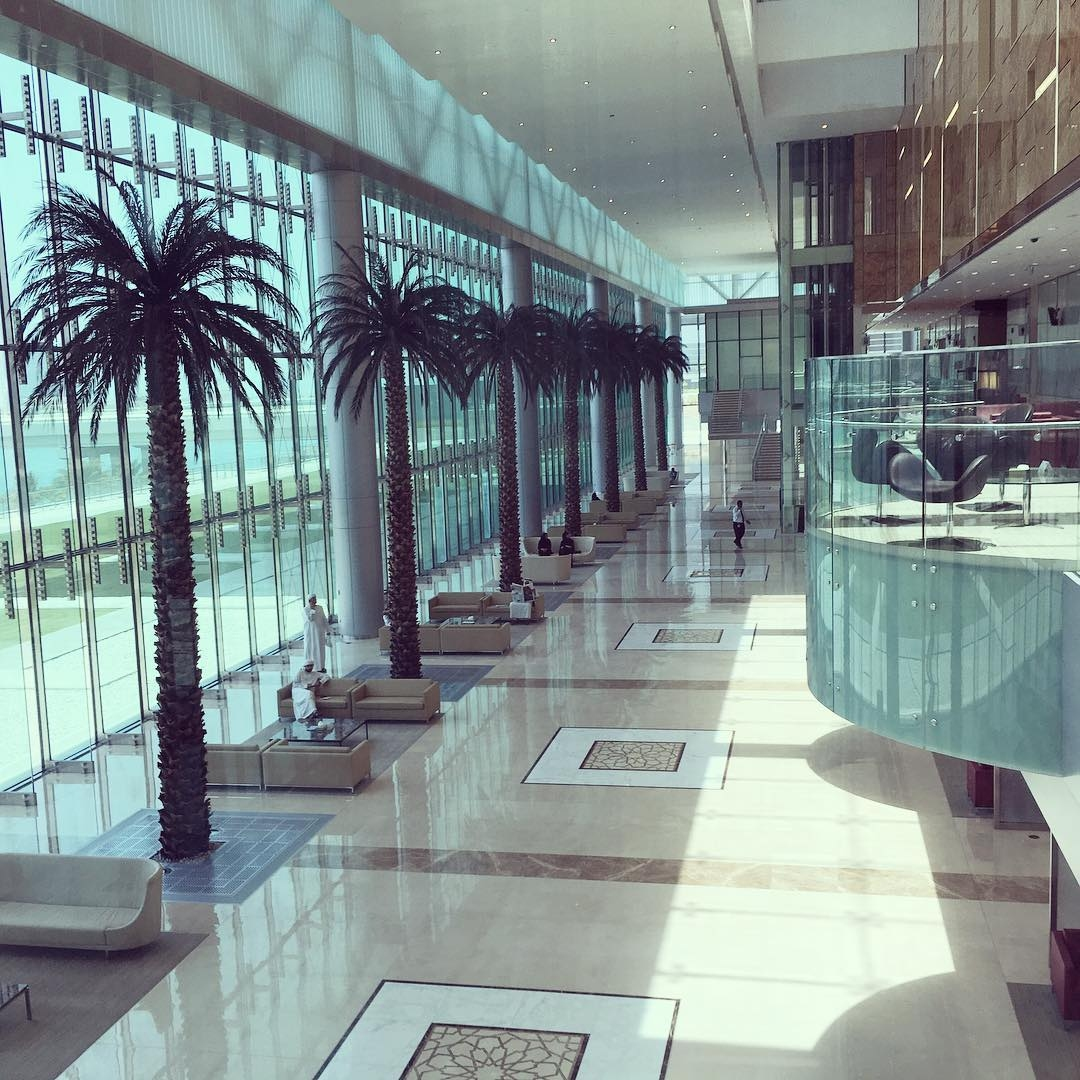
Inside the Cleveland Clinic Abu Dhabi

Cleveland Clinic Abu Dhabi is a 23-acre facility with five clinical floors, three diagnostic and treatment levels, and 13 floors of critical and acute inpatient units. The hospital has 422,681 square metres of floor space and 411 patient beds, with capacity to expand to 490. Its facilities include 321 acute care beds, 90 critical care beds, and 26 operating rooms. The hospital offers more than 50 medical and surgical specialties through eight clinical institutes. And is designed to operate five different specialist centres of excellence covering digestive disease, eye, heart and vascular disorders, neurological treatment, and respiratory and critical care.

More than 5,000 physicians from around the world applied for the initial 175 physician positions in the hospital. Those who were hired had to complete 40 interviews: 20 in the US and another 20 in Abu Dhabi. Eighty percent of the successful applicants were US-trained, and the rest were trained in Western Europe.

== Accreditations and designations ==
The Department of Health - Abu Dhabi designated Cleveland Clinic Abu Dhabi as a Centre of Excellence for stroke, adult cardiac surgery, and for multi-organ transplants.

CCAD received comprehensive stroke centre certification from the America Stroke Association, a division of the American Heart Association, in 2024.

In 2025, its cardiac catheterisation laboratory received cardiac catheterisation lab accreditation with percutaneous coronary intervention from the American College of Cardiology.

The hospital has also received Magnet designation from the American Nurses Credentialing Center in 2019 and was designated for a second time in 2024. It also received accreditation from the Accreditation Council for Continuing Medical Education as a provider of continuing medical education.

== See also ==
- List of hospitals in the United Arab Emirates
