= Latifa Hospital =

Geography
- Location: Dubai, Emirate of Dubai, United Arab Emirates
- Coordinates: 25°13′N 55°19′E

Organisation
- Type: Specialist

Services
- Beds: 367
- Speciality: Women, children

History
- Opened: 1986; 40 years ago as Al Wasl Hospital

Latifa Hospital, previously known as Al Wasl Hospital, is a public hospital in Dubai that provides medical care specifically for women and children. In April 2012, it was renamed Latifa Hospital in memory of Sheikha Latifa bint Hamdan bin Zayed Al Nahyan.

== History ==
Al Wasl Hospital was inaugurated in 1986 as a 40,000 square metre, 367-bed hospital specializing in maternity and paediatrics. The order to change the name to Latifa Hospital was given by Sheikh Mohammed bin Rashid Al Maktoum in order to honor his late mother. This order was given on the 6th anniversary of his accession as the Ruler of Dubai.

The construction of the hospital was carried out by the Dubai-based Habtoor Leighton Group, which was awarded a US$33 million contract. Construction commenced in 1984 and was completed in 1986.

It is reported that the total number of healthcare providers and ancillary employees running the hospital is approximately 1300.

As of 2012, Latifa Hospital performed 6700-7800 deliveries per year.

== Accolades ==
In 2011, the hospital was recognized by the United Nations Children’s Fund as a baby-friendly medical facility. During a ceremony celebrating the achievement Director of the Dubai Health Authority, Qadhi Saeed Almurooshid, stated that the recognition was earned by the implementation of 10 criteria related to the 10 steps for successful breast-feeding in its baby-friendly initiative, which aimed to increase awareness of mothers about the benefits of breast-feeding.

in 2006, Latifa Hospital’s Department of Genetics Centre and Thalassemia Centre was presented with the Hamdan Award for an Outstanding Clinical Department in the Public Sector and in 2012, Latifa Hospital’s Department of Neonatal Care was presented with the Hamdan Award for an Outstanding Clinical Department in the Public Sector in the UAE.
