= Dubai Festival Plaza =

- Location: Jebel Ali, Dubai, United Arab Emirates
- Coordinates: 25°01′46″N 55°06′28″E
- Address: Sheikh Zayed Road (E11), Wasl Gate, Jebel Ali Village, Dubai, UAE
- Opened: 18 December 2019
- Developer: Al-Futtaim Real Estate
- Floor area: 64,800 m^{2} (698,000 sq ft)
- Floors: 2
- Website: dubaifestivalplaza.com

Dubai Festival Plaza, commonly known as Festival Plaza, is a community mall situated in the Jebel Ali district of Dubai, United Arab Emirates. Developed by Al-Futtaim Real Estate, the mall is part of the Wasl Gate mixed-use project in southern Dubai. The facility has a floor area of approximately 64,800 square metres and is anchored by major retailers including IKEA, ACE Hardware, and Lulu Hypermarket.

Festival Plaza was opened in 2019. It serves the residential areas of Jebel Ali, Al Furjan, Wasl Gate, Dubai Marina, and Palm Jumeirah.

== Facilities ==
Festival Plaza is a community mall located in Dubai's Wasl Gate area, comprising two retail floors. It houses 52 stores, dining options, and family entertainment areas. The mall's main anchor tenant is Dubai's largest IKEA store which includes an international training hub, home-planning stations, smart lighting section, a 550-seat restaurant, and the first standalone IKEA café.

Festival Plaza’s retail focuses on homeware and daily essentials. Major tenants include Lulu Hypermarket, ACE Hardware with a café and garden center, Pan Home, and Crate & Barrel. Wellness tenants include the Health Hub, Champs sports club and the Ayur Vaidya spa and salon. Entertainment facilities include a range of children's activities and facilities such as Little Gym, Stay & Play, Rose Ballet, and Global Art, alongside live performances and events. Other amenities include a 200-seat food court, various cafes, and restaurants. Family-oriented facilities include a supervised children's play area, children's activity club, and Scorpion Club entertainment center scheduled to open in 2025.
