= International University of Struga =

Private university in North Macedonia

International University Of Struga
- Меѓународен Универзитет Струга; Universiteti Nderkombetar i Struges
- Motto: Invest in your future
- Type: Private
- Established: 2005
- Rector: Bashkim RAMA, PhD
- Faculty: 40
- Students: 2500
- Location: Struga and Gostivar (North Macedonia)
- Website: http://www.eust.edu.mk

International University of Struga (Macedonian: Меѓународен Универзитет Струга, Albanian:Universiteti Ndërkombetar i Strugës) is a university in North Macedonia. The university has two campuses based in Struga and Gostivar with roughly 2,500 students. The International University of Struga has four faculties: Faculty of Economy and Business, Faculty of Law, Faculty of Political Science and Information Technology.

== Faculties and study programs ==
Faculty	Study Programs
Faculty of Economy	Bachelor / Master / PhD; Economics and Business / Economics and Business / PhD in Economic Sciences; Marketing and financial-management / Marketing and financial-management.
Faculty of Law	Bachelor / Master / PhD; Jurisdiction / Jurisdiction / PhD in Law Sciences; Criminology and detective / Criminology and detective
Faculty of Information Technology	Bachelor / Master / PhD; Computer Sciences / Business Informatics / PhD in Computer Sciences
Faculty of Political Sciences	Bachelor / Master / PhD; Diplomacy / Diplomacy / PhD in Political Sciences

== Academic staff ==
International University of Struga academic staff.
