= International Board of Medicine and Surgery =

The International Board of Medicine and Surgery (IBMS) is an international professional association, established in 2001 and headquartered in Palm Harbor, Florida, that serves as the authority for certifying the credentials and the professionalism of physicians, surgeons, and dentists across all territories and jurisdictions of the world.

== Mission ==
The purpose of IBMS is to promote patient safety and professional integrity and to facilitate medical tourism with information that traveling patients need to make informed choices for their healthcare needs.

== Overview ==
Professional credentials are generally issued by the authority of governmental entities and by the authority of specific professional disciplines. The requirements of these authorities vary somewhat from country to country and from group to group. With the advent of medical tourism, prospective patients have encountered some difficulty in identifying homologous credentials across the world's jurisdictions. To address this confusion, the International Board of Medicine and Surgery (IBMS) applies the requirements and procedures used by public health departments in the United States to effect a standardized certification of medical, surgical, and dental professionals worldwide.

IBMS respects the procedures controlling professional credentials in each jurisdiction and it confirms that each professional member of IBMS has received the appropriate credentials. Homologation of those credentials is effected by ensuring that all professional members of IBMS, regardless of jurisdiction, subscribe to the same international standards of medical treatment and code of ethics.

IBMS's international standards of medical treatment stipulate that:

- the patient will receive adequate linguistic translation;
- the patient will receive communication from appropriate medical personnel both before and after each procedure and will receive any appropriate medical records in the patient's own language;
- the patient will be informed of any pertinent screening criteria;
- the patient will be informed in detail of any procedure meant to address anticipated complications of their proposed medical, surgical, and/or dental procedures;
- the treatment facilities complies with adequate infection-control standards that include the disposal of biohazardous waste and used needles;
- the treatment facilities contain a recovery center in a sanitary setting and that is managed by medically competent personnel;
- the patient be indemnified financially in the event complications arise subsequent to a medical, surgical, or dental procedure and upon returning to the home country.

IBMS's code of ethics stipulates that each professional member shall:

- maintain the highest standard of personal conduct and professional excellence and adhere to the International Code of Medical Ethics;
- uphold the laws and regulations pertinent to the practice of medicine;
- provide patient care impartially, without regard to race, color, creed, sex, national origin, handicap, and sexual orientation;
- promote the quality of medical care by communicating in a professional manner and by maintaining the confidentiality of each patient.

Certification with IBMS is voluntary and is graduated into five levels. All levels require that the member acknowledge IBMS's international standards of medical treatment and IBMS's code of ethics. With each higher level, the professional member produces increasingly more credible evidence demonstrating that he or she can be counted on to adhere to those standards.

- Level 1 ("entry") certification is granted upon self-reporting one's licenses, specialty certifications, and hospital affiliations.
- Level 2 ("silver") certification is granted when IBMS receives notarized copies or third-party verification of the documentation required for Level 1.
- Level 3 ("gold") certification is granted with the addition of evidence of professional distinction (such as publications in professional journals or professorships) and evidence of financial indemnification in the event a complication should arise from a procedure after the patient has returned home.
- Level 4 ("ruby") certification is granted with the addition of evidence that the candidate has completed at least five years of professional distinction within their specialization.
- Level 5 ("emerald") certification is granted by acclamation of the IBMS Medical Advisory Board. The board looks for an established record of safety and efficacy, demonstrated leadership in the candidate's field, and recognition by a professional association at the national or international level.

== Advocacy ==
By means of its graduated certification and its conferences, IBMS encourages its members to pursue continuing education and continual improvement. For the patients of its members, IBMS will act as an impartial intermediary to correct any dissatisfaction with the professional services.
