= Gulf Medical University =

Medical school in the UAE

- جامعة الخليج الطبية
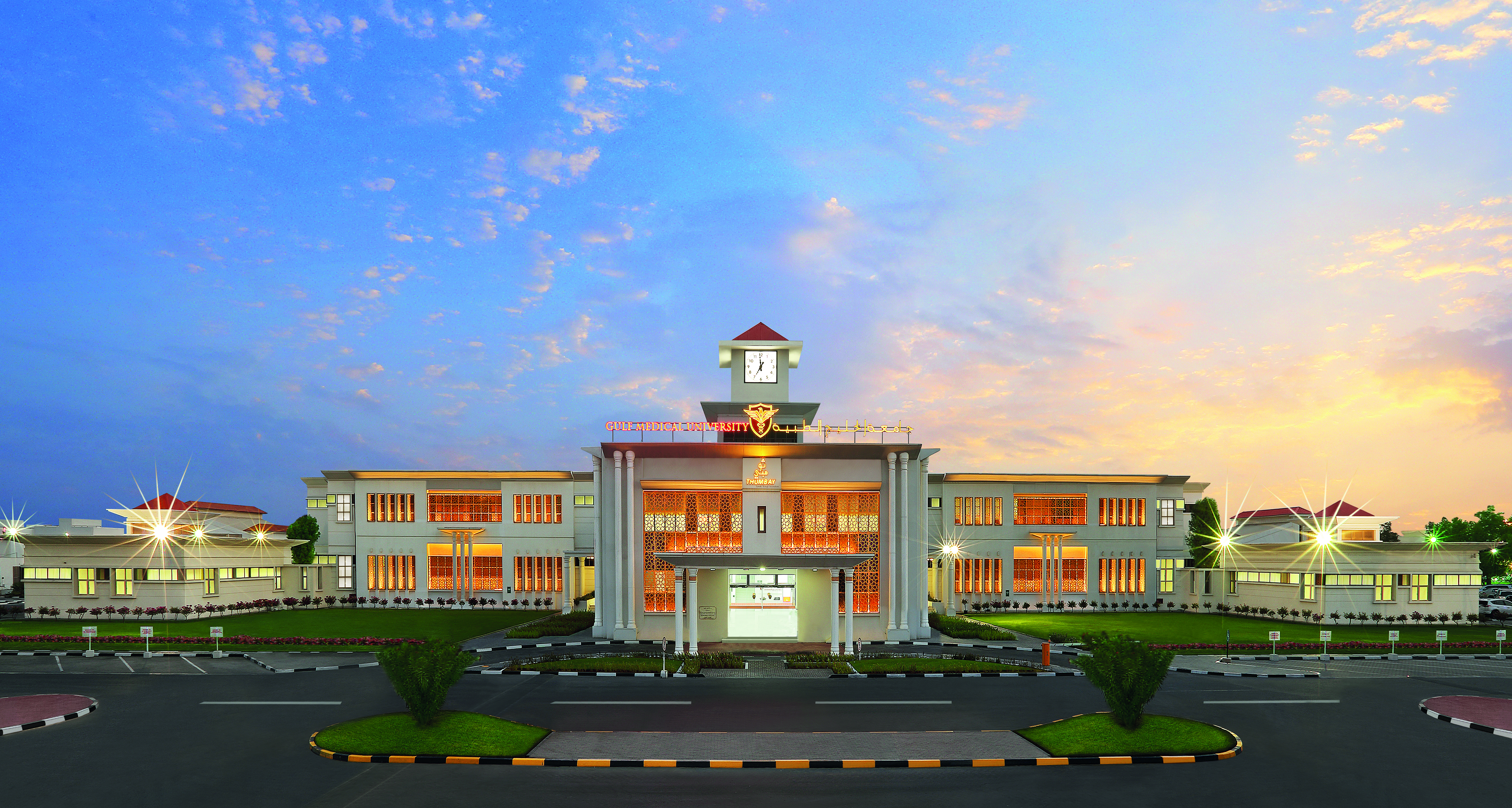
- View of GMU
- Former name: Gulf Medical College
- Motto: Lear from the world
- Type: Private
- Established: 1998
- Founder: Dr. Thumbay Moideen
- Parent institution: Thumbay Group
- Accreditation: CAA
- Affiliations: MOHESR; WHO; Avicenna Directories; IIE; IMED; AUAP; EURAS; AARU; IMSA
- Chancellor: Prof. Dr. Manda Venkatramana
- President: Thumbay Moideen
- Students: 3,500
- Location: Thumbay Medicity, Al Jur, Ajman, UAE; 25°25′3″N 55°29′59″E
- Colors: Red & gold
- Website: gmu.ac.ae
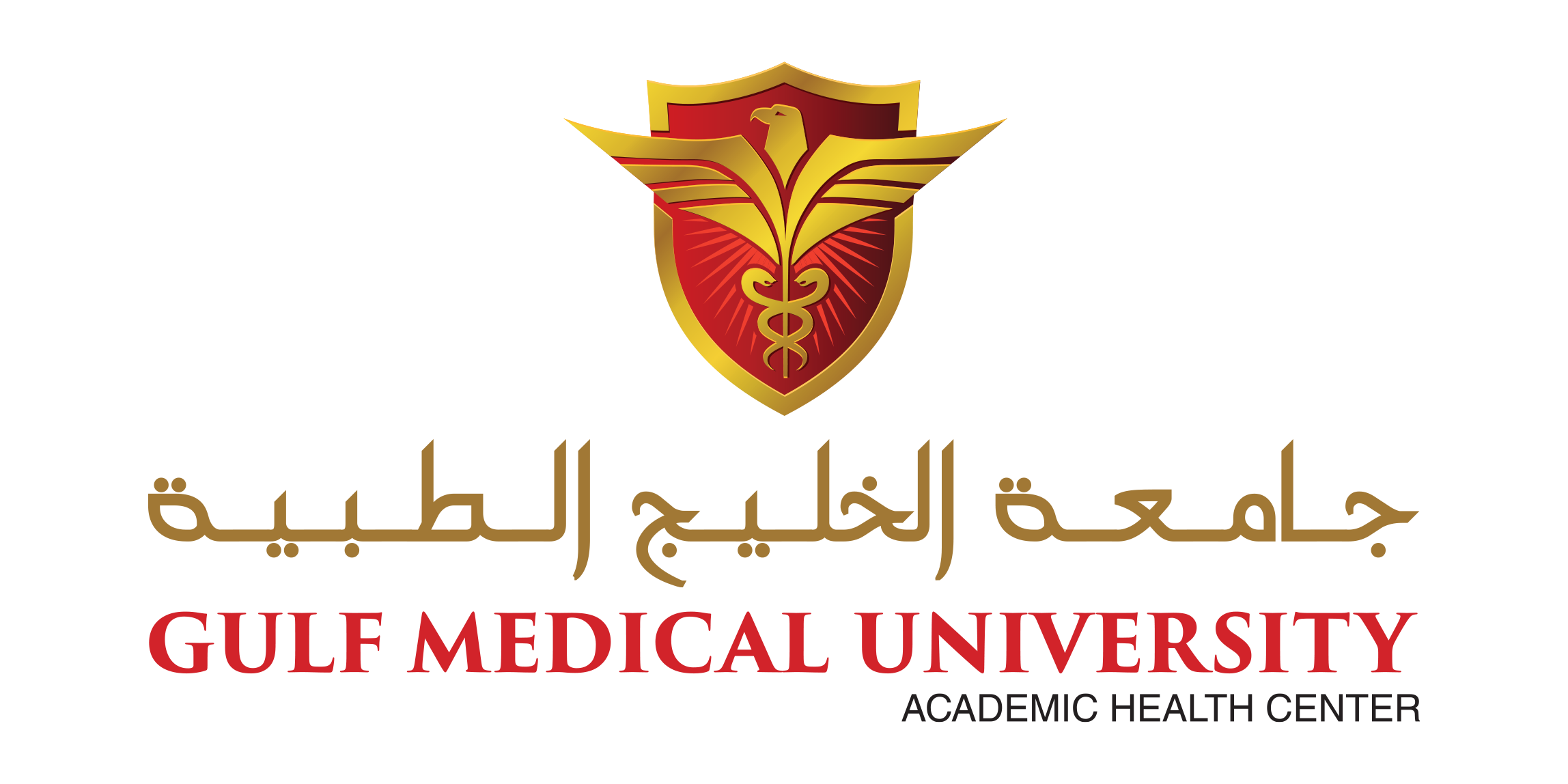

Gulf Medical University (GMU, Arabic: جامعة الخليج الطبية) is a private medical & Management university in Ajman, United Arab Emirates. Established in 1998, it is one of the largest private medical universities in the Middle East region. It has various programs in medicine and health sciences.

Thumbay Moideen is the founder and President of the board of trustees at Gulf Medical University. It is owned and promoted by Thumbay Group. Prof Manda is the Chancellor of GMU.

GMU has Seven colleges and 50 accredited programs. Gulf Medical University is accredited by the Commission for Academic Accreditation (CAA), the UAE Federal Government's quality assurance agency for higher education.

== History ==
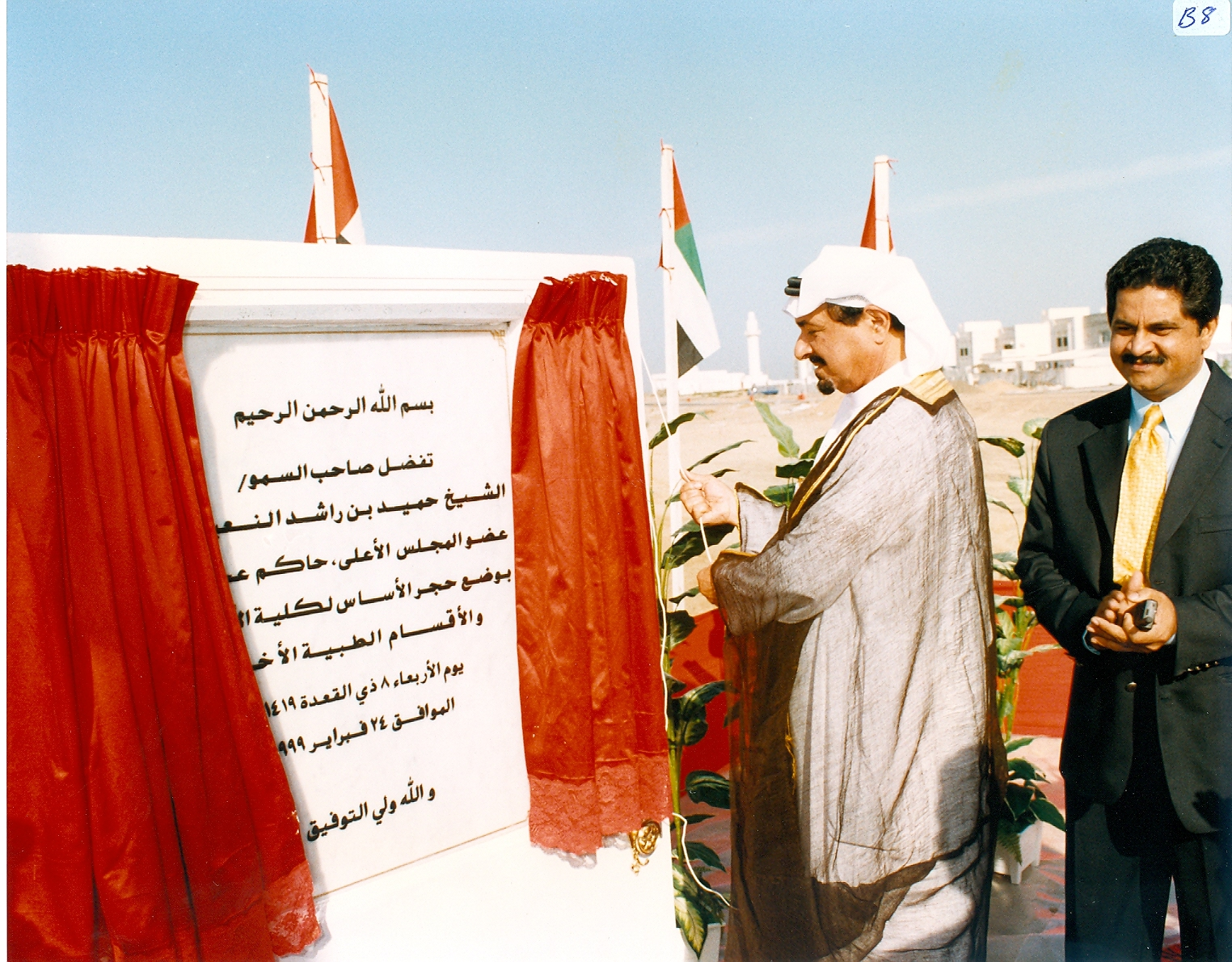
Sheikh Humaid bin Rashid Al Nuaimi lays the foundation stone for Gulf Medical University, along with Dr. Thumbay Moideen.

Gulf Medical University (GMU) is located in the emirate of Ajman, on the western coast of the UAE. It was founded in 1998 as Gulf Medical College (GMC) by the Thumbay Group led by Dr. Thumbay Moideen from Mangalore, India. The college was opened under Decree Number 1, issued on 28 January 1998, by His Highness Sheikh Humaid Bin Rashid Al-Nuaimi, the ruler of Ajman and Member of the Supreme Council, UAE.

The institution became a university in the year 2008 following a royal decree by Sheikh Nahyan Bin Mubarak Al Nahyan, Minister of Higher Education and Scientific Research, United Arab Emirates.

Today, the focus of Gulf Medical University has extended into three core areas: Medical Education, Healthcare, and Research.

== Facilities ==
=== Campus ===
The Gulf Medical University is located at Thumbay Medicity in Al Jurf, Ajman, and currently houses the main campus and its support facilities and academic health centers. It has within itself a research center, laboratories, classrooms and administration buildings, a stand-alone building that houses the library and the multimedia centers, a food court, restaurants, coffee shops and a sports complex with courts for tennis, basketball, volleyball, and grounds for cricket and football.

=== Research facility ===
The Thumbay Research Institute for Precision Medicine (TRIPM) is an interdisciplinary basic and translational cancer and diabetes research program to meet the growing challenges facing UAE healthcare providers dealing with the increase in cancer burden and diabetes disease. It will focus its activities on comprehensive, translational research and personalised medicine.

=== Institutes ===
- The Thumbay Institute of Population Health focuses on postgraduate studies and research in the fields of public health, Epidemiology, Big Data Analysis, Evidence Based Medicine & Policy and Global Health.
- The Thumbay Institute of Health Workforce Development includes the "Center for Advanced Simulation in Healthcare" (CASH), the "Center for Continuing Education and Community Outreach" (CCE&CO) and the "Center for Health Professions Education and Research" (CHPER). Its main goal is to respond to national, regional and international shortages and the need for a competent health workforce, "Doctors, Pharmacist, Dentist, Nurses, Paramedics and All Allied Health".

=== Virtual Patient Learning (VPL) ===
GMU is the first university in the Middle East region to introduce Virtual Patient Learning (VPL).

=== 3D Learning ===
GMU is the first medical university in the region to introduce 3D Digital Learning.

=== Testing Center ===
With a capacity of holding up to 88 participants, GMU is an international center for the MRCP (UK) PACES examination.

=== Startup Lab ===
Helps GMU students and alumni turn their business ideas into reality.

=== Sports, recreation, and socialization ===
The campus has the following amenities for students:

- Body & Soul Health Club & Spa
- Blends & Brews Coffee Shoppe
- The Terrace Restaurant
- Mosque

== Academic Health System ==
The Gulf Medical University Academic Health System (GMUAHS) is the first such initiative in the UAE's private sector. Part of GMUAHS are the Thumbay Hospitals and Thumbay Clinics operated by the healthcare division of Thumbay Group at multiple locations in Dubai, Ajman, Sharjah, Fujairah, Ras Al Khaimah, and Umm Al Quwain, as well as Thumbay Hospital – Hyderabad. The latest additions to the GMU Academic Health System include Thumbay University Hospital, Thumbay Dental Hospital and Thumbay Physical Therapy and Rehabilitation Hospital, all within the GMU campus at Thumbay Medicity.

== Colleges Under Gulf Medical University ==
=== College of Medicine ===
The college conducts Bachelor of Medicine & Bachelor of Surgery (MBBS) program, Bachelor of Biomedical Sciences (BBMS), Associate Degree in Preclinical Sciences (ADPCS), Masters in Public Health (MPH) program in collaboration with the University of Arizona, USA, Joint Masters in Health Professions Education (JMHPE) Program with FAIMER, USA and the medical internship program.

The Thumbay Institute of Population Studies has begun recently under this college.

=== College of Dentistry ===
The college conducts three programs: Doctor of Dental Medicine (D.M.D) program, internship program and Master of Dental Surgery (M.D.S) program in Endodontics and Periodontics.

=== College of Pharmacy ===
The college conducts two programs: Doctor of Pharmacy (PharmD) entry-to-practice degree program and Master in Clinical Pharmacy (MCP) degree program that offers several areas of specialization, including cardiology, infectious diseases, parenteral nutrition, and others. Both programs are accredited by the Commission for Academic Accreditation, Ministry of Education, UAE and the PharmD program is under certification by the Accreditation Council for Pharmacy Education, USA.

=== College of Health Sciences ===
The college conducts programs in Physical Therapy, Medical Laboratory Sciences, Medical Imaging Sciences, as well as Anesthesia Technology.

=== College of Nursing ===
GMU includes a College of Nursing.

=== College of Healthcare Management and Economics (CoHME) ===
CoHME conducts a four-year Bachelor of Science in Healthcare Management and Economics and a 3 Semesters Executives Master in Healthcare Management and Economics.

In May 2019, Ajman University and Gulf Medical University signed a Memorandum of Understanding (MoU) to support academic collaboration between the two institutions. This agreement spotlights technical cooperation, collaborative scientific research opportunities, and the initiation of dual-degree programs.

== Events and activities ==
=== GMU Annual Sports Festival ===
The week-long inter-university sports festival hosted by GMU annually is the biggest sporting event of its kind in the country.

=== 'Future Scientists of the UAE' Initiative ===
Launched by GMU in collaboration with GEMS International Schools, students are selected from grades 9 to 12 from various schools under GEMS, through a competitive admission process. These future scientists are mentored by research scientists, professors and clinical staff at Gulf Medical University. GMU's world-class research facility, The Thumbay Research Institute for Precision Medicine – plays a central role in the program.

=== Global Alumni Summit ===
Held biennially, the GMU Global Alumni Summit, organized by the GMU Students Affairs Department, recognizes the most outstanding accomplishments of its alumni.

=== Student Council Executive Board ===
Elected representatives from the Student Council form the Student Council Executive Board. This is made up of one elected student from each program who will attend the respective college council meetings called for by the deans of the respective colleges.

A General Secretary is elected from amongst the council's executive board along with a few Joint Secretaries on an annual basis. The institute honors its elected officials by placing their names on the university board's main entrance hall.

COP28 UAE

Gulf Medical University partnered with Edward & Cynthia Institute of Public Health (ECIPH) and Columbia University Mailman School of Public Health to hold Health and Climate Change discussions on the sidelines of COP 28 in UAE in the year 2023.

== Thumbay Medicity ==
Gulf Medical University is located in Thumbay Medicity, Ajman, the regional hub of medical education, healthcare, and research. The Medicity occupies 1,200,000 square feet (110,000 m^{2}) and can serve up to 20,000 people daily
