= Dubai Health Authority =

Government organization overseeing the health system of Dubai, United Arab Emirates

Coordinates: 25°14′51″N 55°19′9″E

- هيئة الصحة بدبي

Agency overview
- Jurisdiction: Emirate of Dubai
- Headquarters: Umm Hurair, Dubai
- Agency executive: Alawi Alsheikh-Ali, Director-General
- Website: dha.gov.ae

The Dubai Health Authority (Arabic: هيئة الصحة بدبي, romanized: Hayʼat al-Ṣiḥḥah bi-Dubayy) is a government of Dubai authority that oversees health regulations in the Emirate of Dubai, United Arab Emirates.

== Background ==
The Dubai Health Authority (DHA) was formed in 2007 under the directives of Sheikh Mohammed bin Rashid Al Maktoum, the Vice President, Prime Minister, and Ruler of Dubai. The program was launched in March 2008.

Before the DHA was established, the body overseeing healthcare in the emirate was known as the Department of Health and Medical Services, which was established in 1973.

Beyond general oversight of Dubai's healthcare sector the DHA provides healthcare services through hospitals and other facilities that fall under its direct jurisdiction. These include Latifa Hospital, Dubai Hospital, Rashid Hospital and Hatta Hospital, in addition to other specialty centres and DHA primary health centres throughout Dubai.

Other aspects of the DHA's services are:

- Creating and ensuring the execution of policies and strategies for healthcare in Dubai's public and private healthcare sectors.
- Enabling partnerships between healthcare providers.
- Licensing and regulating medical professionals and facilities.

== History ==
The Dubai Health Authority co-sponsored the 10th Annual International Conference on Medical Regulation, which took place at the Ottawa Convention Centre in Ontario, Canada in October 2012.

=== Dubai Healthcare Reform ===
In November 2013, the Dubai Health Authority announced a new law that aimed to make sure that every person in Dubai had their own health insurance. Beyond ensuring that both locals and expats in Dubai would have access to affordable and quality medical care when needed, the law would also attract foreign investment to Dubai's healthcare sector and reduce much of the burden that healthcare costs put on the public at large.

The law, known as the Insurance System for Advancing Healthcare in Dubai (ISAHD), is to be rolled out in several steps in order to help individuals and businesses adjust and adapt. These phases are as follows:

Phase 1 - October 31, 2014: By this date companies with 1,000 or more employees must provide health insurance for all of their employees.

Phase 2 – July 31, 2015: By this date companies with 100 or more employees must provide health insurance for all of their employees.

Phase 3 – June 30, 2016: By this date companies with any number of employees must provide health insurance for all of their employees. Additionally, employed individuals will have to have made arrangements to insure any of their dependents, and families will have to arrange to insure any domestic workers in their employ by this date.

Under the reform, employers are required to arrange for and bear the cost of their employees’ health insurance, and are not able to merely provide an allowance for the insurance that their employees would then use to find insurance on their own. According to Dr. Al Yousuf, Director of Health Funding at the DHA, companies that fail to adhere to the new law can face penalties including a monthly fine for each employee not covered, or even the non-renewal of trade licenses.

While UAE nationals who are Dubai residents will be the responsibility of the Dubai government under the reform, foreign nationals coming to Dubai are required to have arranged for their own health insurance coverage prior to their arrival in the Emirate, and health insurance will be a pre-requisite for obtaining residency or a visit visa.

In order to operate selling health insurance in Dubai following the reform, insurers, TPAs, brokers and healthcare providers will all be required to obtain a permit from the DHA on an annual basis. In order to control costs under the reform, the DHA has also established a price list for medical services that healthcare providers must adhere to.

As far as the requirements of health insurance products themselves, the DHA has mandated a minimum coverage that must be adhered to by all policies in the Emirate, although coverage that goes above and beyond the minimum is also allowed. Varying minimums have been set forth for UAE nationals, expatriate residents, and visitors. Specific medical services and treatments that are required under all basic health plans include:

In-Patient

- Tests
- Diagnosis
- Treatment
- Surgery
- Emergency treatment

Maternity

- Out-patient ante-natal
- In-patient maternity
- Newborn cover

Out-Patient

- Examination
- Diagnostics and treatment by general practitioners
- Specialists and consultants
- Laboratory testing
- Radiology diagnostic services
- Physiotherapy
- Medicines
- Vaccines and immunizations
- Diabetes screening
- Diagnostics and treatment for dental and gum treatment
- Hearing and vision aids
- Corrective laser and surgical treatment for vision

As a result of the reform, insurers in Dubai will no longer be allowed to deny coverage to individuals due to pre-existing and chronic condition exclusions after the first 6 months of coverage.

The maximum annual benefit limit for Basic Health Plans under the reform is AED150,000, excluding co-insurance and deductible payments. Furthermore, co-insurance payments on the part of the insured can be as high as 20%, and a General Practitioner will need to be seen, and a referral given, before the insured may consult with specialists.

== Dubai Medical Tourism Club ==
Chaired by His Excellency Engineer Essa Al Maidoor, Director General of the Dubai Health Authority, the Dubai medical tourism club is an initiative which was established by the DHA to find ways to promote develop and sustain medical tourism in Dubai.

Al Maidoor stated “The idea behind the medical tourism club is to brainstorm and to receive feedback and suggestions from key industry experts so that the Authority and the private sector can work together to ensure we utilize all our resources to promote medical tourism in Dubai."

Furthermore, the goals of the medical tourism club include:

- Facilitating the Dubai medical tourism program
- Promoting medical tourism services in Dubai
- To collectively contribute to the Dubai medical tourism strategy by identifying new markets and services

Dr Layla Al Marzouqi, director of the DHA health regulation department and director of the Dubai medical tourism initiative, stated the standards to be a member of the club, saying: “There is an eligibility criterion for membership. While facility, physician and clinical requirements are essential to ensure quality and capability of health facilities; key hospitality requirements are needed to ensure medical tourists and their family members are comfortable.”

There of the 24 registered members, 15 are from hospitals, two are from day-care surgery centers and seven belong to multi-specialty clinics.
